= IAAF Grand Prix =

International track and field competition

- Sport: Outdoor track and field
- Founded: 1985
- Ceased: 2009
- Continent: Global

The IAAF Grand Prix was an annual, global circuit of one-day outdoor track and field competitions organized by the International Association of Athletics Federations (IAAF). It was created in 1985 as the IAAF's first seasonal track and field circuit and lasted until 2009. Athletes scored points based on their performances on the circuit and the top athletes were invited to the annual IAAF Grand Prix Final.

The IAAF Grand Prix expanded over its lifetime to incorporate the IAAF Golden League, the IAAF Super Grand Prix, IAAF Grand Prix and IAAF Grand Prix II. IAAF/Area Permit Meetings were also attached to the series, allowing athletes to score additional points in certain events at lower level meetings. In 2003 the series concept was renamed at the IAAF World Outdoor Meetings and the Grand Prix was reduced to a single tier of competitions within that tour. The series was again folded into the IAAF World Athletics Tour upon its creation in 2006, before being rendered defunct by the introduction of the IAAF Diamond League and IAAF World Challenge in 2010.

== History ==
Created in 1985, the IAAF Grand Prix was the first global series of outdoor invitational track and field meetings organised by the IAAF. It followed on from the IAAF Golden Events (1978–82), where the IAAF helped finance meetings between the world's top athletes to encourage seasonal engagement with the sport outside of the Olympic cycle. The creation of the IAAF Grand Prix circuit came two years after the first World Championships in Athletics in 1983, highlighting the sports governing body's pivot to a more direct role in organising athletics competitions.

From 1985 to 1992 the series featured Grand Prix Meetings and IAAF Permit Meetings. The series culminated in the IAAF Grand Prix Final, which athletes gained qualification to based on their performances at the series' meetings. The competing athletes at the final earned additional points for their performances there, and the series winner of each event was the athlete with the highest score (as opposed to the Grand Prix Final event winner). In 1993 the Grand Prix format was amended so that the event winner was the first place athlete at the Final competitions, rather than the seasonal points leader, and this format continued until the last Grand Prix Final in 2002.

In 1993 the IAAF Council approved a new tier of IAAF Grand Prix II meetings, which Permit-level meetings could apply for after two years. That same year four of the Grand Prix meetings (Oslo, Zurich, Brussels and Berlin) organised a Golden Four group of top-level European meetings within the series. In response, the IAAF Grand Prix series was again expanded with the foundation of the IAAF Golden League in 1998, which split out the Golden Four meetings (plus the Herculis and Golden Gala meets) as a new top tier within the IAAF Grand Prix circuit. After this point, the IAAF Grand Prix referred to multiple concepts in that it was both an annual series of track and field meetings incorporating four tiers (the IAAF Golden League, IAAF Grand Prix, IAAF Grand Prix II and Area Permit Meetings) as well as a term to refer to the second and third tiers of that series. In 2003, an IAAF Super Grand Prix level was added to the circuit, the IAAF Permit Meeting tier was dropped, and the Grand Prix Final was replaced with the IAAF World Athletics Final.

In 2003 the IAAF World Outdoor Meetings brand superseded the IAAF Grand Prix to the umbrella series concept and Grand Prix levels I and II continued within that series. In 2006, the IAAF World Athletics Tour was formed to replace the World Outdoor Meetings and at this time the IAAF Grand Prix II tier was dropped in favour of an Area Permit Meeting structure. The IAAF Grand Prix was made defunct along with the World Athletics Tour in 2010, as both were replaced by the IAAF Diamond League and IAAF World Challenge series.

== Editions ==
The IAAF Grand Prix calendar was subject to change during its lifetime, with the number of meetings, the constituent meetings, the categorisation of meetings, and the duration of the series all regularly changing from year to year. Athletes received points based on their performances at the meetings on the circuit, with more points being given at the more prestigious and competitive competitions. From 2006 to 2009, series points could also be scored in certain events at Area Permit Meeting qualifiers (APM-Qs), although the meetings themselves were not considered a formal part of the meeting series.

A total of seven meeting categories existed over the lifetime of the circuit:

- GL : IAAF Golden League
- SGP : IAAF Super Grand Prix
- GP : IAAF Grand Prix
- GP2 : IAAF Grand Prix II
- GPF : IAAF Grand Prix Final
- WAF : IAAF World Athletics Final
- PM : IAAF/Area Permit Meeting

Key: As part of IAAF World Outdoor Meetings As part of IAAF World Athletics Tour

Edition	Year	Start date	End date	Meets	GL	SGP	GP	GP2	PM	Final	Final date	Ref.
1	1985	25 May	7 September	15	–	–	15	–	?	1985 IAAF Grand Prix Final	7 September	
2	1986	3 May	21 September	15	–	–	15	–	13	1986 IAAF Grand Prix Final	10 September	
3	1987	23 April	11 September	15^{*}	–	–	15	–	?	1987 IAAF Grand Prix Final	11 September	
4	1988	28 May	26 August	16	–	–	16	–	?	1988 IAAF Grand Prix Final	13 September	
5	1989	27 May	1 September	16	–	–	16	–	?	1989 IAAF Grand Prix Final	1 September	
6	1990	20 May	7 September	19	–	–	19	–	?	1990 IAAF Grand Prix Final	7 September	
7	1991	19 May	20 September	18	–	–	18	–	?	1991 IAAF Grand Prix Final	20 September	
8	1992	25 February	19 September	17	–	–	17	–	15	1992 IAAF Grand Prix Final	4 September	
9	1993	25 February	10 September	16	–	–	16	–	12	1993 IAAF Grand Prix Final	10 September	
10	1994	24 February	15 September	23	–	–	15	8	8	1994 IAAF Grand Prix Final	3 September	
11	1995	23 February	15 September	24	–	–	15	9	10	1995 IAAF Grand Prix Final	9 September	
12	1996	29 February	16 September	29	–	–	17	12	10	1996 IAAF Grand Prix Final	7 September	
13	1997	20 February	20 September	26	–	–	16	10	12	1997 IAAF Grand Prix Final	13 September	
14	1998	25 February	30 August	26	6	–	9	11	11	1998 IAAF Grand Prix Final	5 September	
15	1999	25 February	5 September	28	7	–	10	11	?	1999 IAAF Grand Prix Final	11 September	
16	2000	2 March	3 September	26	7	–	9	10	13	2000 IAAF Grand Prix Final	5 October	
17	2001	1 March	2 September	28	7	–	10	11	11	2001 IAAF Grand Prix Final	9 September	
18	2002	7 March	8 September	27	7	–	9	11	10	2002 IAAF Grand Prix Final	14 September	
19	2003	1 March	7 September	34	6	7	10	11	–	2003 IAAF World Athletics Final	13–14 September	
20	2004	12 February	12 September	34	6	8	9	11	–	2004 IAAF World Athletics Final	18–19 September	
21	2005	17 February	4 September	34	6	8	10	10	–	2005 IAAF World Athletics Final	9–10 September	
22	2006	9 March	3 September	24	6	6	12	–	25	2006 IAAF World Athletics Final	9–10 September	
23	2007	2 March	16 September	24	6	5	13	–	27	2007 IAAF World Athletics Final	22–23 September	
24	2008	28 September 2007	9 September 2008	25	6	5	14	–	29	2008 IAAF World Athletics Final	13–14 September	
25	2009	20 September 2008	6 September 2009	25	6	5	14	–	29	2009 IAAF World Athletics Final	12–13 September	

^{*} Additionally in the 1987 season, four North American meetings each organized four or five individual events with Grand Prix status.

== Meetings ==
#	Meeting	City	Country	85	86	87	88	89	90	91	92	93	94	95	96	97	98	99	00	01	02	03	04	05	06	07	08	09
1	Bislett Games	Oslo	Norway	GP	GP	GP	GP	GP	GP	GP	GP	GP	GP	GP	GP	GP	GL	GL	GL	GL	GL	GL	GL	GL	GL	GL	GL	GL
2	Golden Gala	Rome	Italy	GPF	GPF	GP	GP	GP	GP	GP	GP	GP	GP	GP	GP	GP	GL	GL	GL	GL	GL	GL	GL	GL	GL	GL	GL	GL
3	Weltklasse Zürich	Zürich	Switzerland	GP	GP	GP	GP	GP	GP	GP	GP	GP	GP	GP	GP	GP	GL	GL	GL	GL	GL	GL	GL	GL	GL	GL	GL	GL
4	Memorial Van Damme	Brussels	Belgium	GP	GP	GPF	GP	GP	GP	GP	GP	GP	GP	GP	GP	GP	GL	GL	GL	GL	GL	GL	GL	GL	GL	GL	GL	GL
5	ISTAF Berlin	Berlin	Germany	GP	GP	GP	GPF	GP	GP	GP	GP	GP	GP	GP	GP	GP	GL	GL	GL	GL	GL	GL	GL	GL	GL	GL	GL	GL
6	Meeting Areva	Saint-Denis	France	-	PM	-	-	-	GP	GP	GP	GP	GP	GP	GP	GP	GP	GL	GL	GL	GL	GL	GL	GL	GL	GL	GL	GL
7	Herculis	Monte Carlo	Monaco	-	-	-	-	GPF	-	GP	GP	GP	GP	GP	GP	GP	GL	GL	GL	GL	GL	WAF	WAF	WAF	SGP	SGP	SGP	SGP
8	London Grand Prix	London	United Kingdom	GP	GP	GP	GP	GP	GP	GP	GP	GP	GP	GP	GP	GP	GP	GP	GP	GP	GP	SGP	SGP	SGP	SGP	SGP	SGP	SGP
9	DN Galan	Stockholm	Sweden	GP	GP	GP	GP	GP	GP	GP	GP	GP	GP	GP	GP	GP	GP	GP	GP	GP	GP	SGP	SGP	SGP	SGP	SGP	SGP	SGP
10	Athletissima	Lausanne	Switzerland	-	PM	-	GP	GP	GP	GP	GP	GP	GP	GP	GP	GP	GP	GP	GP	GP	GP	SGP	SGP	SGP	SGP	SGP	SGP	SGP
11	Qatar Athletic Super Grand Prix	Doha	Qatar	-	-	-	-	-	-	-	-	-	-	-	-	-	GP2	GP	GPF	GP	GP	-	SGP	SGP	SGP	SGP	SGP	SGP
12	Athens Grand Prix Tsiklitiria	Athens	Greece	-	-	-	-	-	GPF	-	-	-	-	-	-	-	-	GP2	GP	GP	GP	SGP	SGP	SGP	SGP	GP	GP	GP
13	British Grand Prix	Gateshead	United Kingdom	-	-	-	-	-	-	-	PM	PM	GP2	GP2	GP2	GP2	GP2	GP2	GP2	GP2	GP2	SGP	SGP	SGP	GP	GP	GP	GP
14	Golden Spike Ostrava	Ostrava	Czech Republic	-	-	-	-	-	-	-	-	-	-	-	-	-	-	-	-	-	-	SGP	SGP	SGP	GP	GP	GP	GP
15	Meeting de Atletismo Madrid	Madrid	Spain	-	-	-	-	-	-	-	-	-	-	-	-	-	-	-	-	-	-	SGP	SGP	SGP	GP	GP	GP	GP
16	Meeting Nikaïa	Nice	France	GP	GP	GP	GP	GP	GP	GP	GP	GP	GP	GP	GP	GP	GP	GP	GP	GP	-	-	-	-	-	-	-	-
17	Weltklasse in Köln	Cologne	Germany	GP	GP	GP	GP	GP	GP	GP	GP	GP	GP	GP	GP	GP	-	GP	-	-	-	-	-	-	-	-	-	-
18	Bruce Jenner Classic	San Jose	United States	GP	GP	GP	GP	GP	GP	GP	GP	GP	GP	GP	GP2	-	-	-	-	-	-	-	-	-	-	-	-	-
19	New York Games	New York City	United States	-	-	-	-	-	-	GP	GP	GP	GP	GP	-	-	-	-	-	-	-	-	-	-	-	-	-	-
20	Prefontaine Classic	Eugene	United States	GP	-	-	-	-	-	-	-	-	-	-	GP	GP	GP	GP	GP	GP	GP	GP	GP	GP	GP	GP	GP	GP
21	Grande Premio Brasil Caixa de Atletismo	Belém	Brazil	-	PM	-	-	-	GP	GP	GP	GP	GP	GP	GP	GP	GP	GP	GP	GP	GP	GP	GP	GP	GP	GP	GP	GP
22	Osaka Grand Prix	Osaka	Japan	-	-	-	-	-	-	-	-	-	-	-	GP	GP	GP	GP	GP	GP	GP	GP	GP	GP	GP	GP	GP	GP
23	Helsinki Grand Prix	Helsinki	Finland	GP	GP	GP	GP	GP	GP	GP	GP	-	GP2	GP2	GP2	GP2	GP2	GP2	GP2	GP2	GP2	GP	-	GP	GP	-	-	-
24	Brothers Znamensky Memorial	Kazan	Russia	GP	GP	GP	GP	GP	GP	GP	PM	PM	PM	GP2	GP	GP	-	-	PM	PM	PM	GP2	GP2	GP2	-	-	-	-
25	IAC International	Edinburgh	United Kingdom	GP	GP	GP	GP	GP	GP	-	-	-	-	-	-	-	-	-	-	-	-	-	-	-	-	-	-	-
26	Hungalu Budapest Grand Prix	Budapest	Hungary	GP	GP	GP	GP	GP	GP	-	PM	PM	PM	PM	PM	PM	PM	-	PM	PM	-	-	-	-	-	-	-	-
27	Olympischer Tag	East Berlin	East Germany	-	GP	GP	GP	GP	GP	-	-	-	-	-	-	-	-	-	-	-	-	-	-	-	-	-	-	-
28	Rosicky Memorial	Prague	Czechoslovakia	GP	PM	GP	-	-	-	-	-	-	-	-	-	-	-	-	-	-	-	-	-	-	-	-	-	-
29	Cena Slovenska - Slovak Gold	Bratislava	Slovakia	-	GP	-	GP	-	GP	GP	PM	PM	GP2	GP2	GP2	GP2	GP2	GP2	GP2	GP2	GP2	GP2	-	-	-	-	-	-
30	FBK Games	Hengelo	Netherlands	-	-	-	-	-	-	-	PM	PM	GP2	GP2	GP2	GP2	GP2	GP2	GP2	GP2	GP2	GP	GP	GP	GP	GP	GP	GP
31	Rieti Meeting	Rieti	Italy	PM	PM	PM	PM	PM	PM	PM	PM	PM	GP2	GP2	GP2	GP2	GP2	GP2	GP2	GP2	GP2	GP	GP	GP	GP	GP	GP	GP
32	Melbourne Track Classic	Melbourne	Australia	-	-	-	-	-	-	-	PM	PM	PM	PM	GP2	GP2	GP2	GP2	GP2	GP2	GP2	GP2	GP2	GP2	GP	GP	GP	GP
33	Hanžeković Memorial	Zagreb	Croatia	-	-	-	-	-	-	-	-	-	-	-	-	-	-	-	GP2	GP2	GP2	GP	GP	GP	GP	GP	GP	GP
34	Meeting Grand Prix IAAF de Dakar	Dakar	Senegal	-	-	-	-	-	-	-	-	-	-	-	-	-	-	-	-	-	-	-	-	-	GP	GP	GP	GP
35	Adidas Grand Prix	New York City	United States	-	-	-	-	-	-	-	-	-	-	-	-	-	-	-	-	-	-	-	-	-	-	GP	GP	GP
36	Shanghai Golden Grand Prix	Shanghai	China	-	-	-	-	-	-	-	-	-	-	-	-	-	-	-	-	-	-	-	-	-	-	-	GP	GP
37	Gran Premio Diputación	Seville	Spain	-	-	-	-	-	-	-	GP	GP	GP2	GP2	GP2	GP2	GP2	GP2	GP2	GP2	GP2	GP	GP	GP	-	-	-	-
38	Gugl Grand Prix	Linz	Austria	-	-	-	-	-	-	-	PM	PM	GP2	GP2	GP2	GP2	GP2	GP2	GP2	GP2	GP2	GP	GP	GP	-	-	-	-
39	Meeting Lille-Métropole	Villeneuve-d'Ascq	France	-	-	-	-	-	-	-	-	-	-	PM	PM	PM	PM	-	PM	PM	PM	GP	GP	GP	-	-	-	-
40	Memorial Primo Nebiolo	Turin	Italy	-	-	-	-	-	-	-	GPF	-	-	-	-	PM	PM	-	PM	PM	PM	GP2	GP2	GP2	-	-	-	-
41	Palo Alto Meeting	Palo Alto	United States	-	-	-	-	-	-	-	-	-	-	-	-	-	-	-	-	GP	GP	GP2	GP2	GP2	-	-	-	-
42	International Meeting Thessaloniki	Thessaloniki	Greece	-	-	-	-	-	-	-	-	-	-	-	-	-	-	-	PM	PM	PM	GP2	GP2	GP2	-	-	-	WAF
43	Atlanta Grand Prix	Atlanta	United States	-	-	-	-	-	-	-	-	-	-	-	GP	-	-	-	-	-	-	-	-	-	-	-	-	-
44	US Open Meet	St. Louis	United States	-	-	-	-	-	-	-	-	-	-	-	-	-	GP	GP	-	-	-	-	-	-	-	-	-	-
45	Pontiac Grand Prix Invitational	Raleigh	United States	-	-	-	-	-	-	-	-	-	-	-	-	-	-	-	GP	-	-	-	-	-	-	-	-	-

- The 1985–1987 IAC International meets were held in London
- The 1986 Olympischer Tag was held in Dresden
- The 1988 Golden Gala was held in Verona
- The London Grand Prix was held in Sheffield in 1997 and 1998
- The second British meet was held in Sheffield in 2002, 2005, and 2007
- The 1990–1994 Saint-Denis/Paris meets were held in Lille.
- The 1996–2001 Grande Premio Brasil Caixa de Atletismo meets were held in Rio de Janeiro
- The 2003 Athens Grand Prix Tsiklitiria was held in Trikala
- The Brothers Znamensky Memorial was held in Moscow (1985, 1987, 1990–1997, 2001–2002), Leningrad (1988), Volgograd (1989), St Petersburg (2000), and Tula, Russia (2003); in 1986 the Moscow meeting was called Goodwill Games

== Series winners ==
In addition to event-level winners decided after the IAAF Grand Prix Final, the male and female athletes with the highest points scores across ally events were crowned the overall IAAF Grand Prix winners. Prize money was awarded to the eight top-scoring athletes on the circuit, with first prize being US$200,000 in 1998.

Year	Men's winner	Men's points	Women's winner	Women's points
1985	Doug Padilla (USA)	63	Mary Slaney (USA)	69
1986	Saïd Aouita (MAR)	63	Yordanka Donkova (BUL)	69
1987	Tonie Campbell (USA)	63	Merlene Ottey (JAM)	63
1988	Saïd Aouita (MAR)	63	Paula Ivan (ROM)	63
1989	Saïd Aouita (MAR)	69	Paula Ivan (ROM)	67
1990	Leroy Burrell (USA)	63	Merlene Ottey (JAM)	63
1991	Sergey Bubka (URS)	69	Heike Henkel (GER)	63
1992	Kevin Young (USA)	63	Heike Drechsler (GER)	63
1993	Sergey Bubka (UKR)	72	Sandra Farmer-Patrick (USA)	72
1994	Noureddine Morceli (ALG)	78	Jackie Joyner-Kersee (USA)	72
1995	Moses Kiptanui (KEN)	84	Maria Mutola (MOZ)	78
1996	Daniel Komen (KEN)	103	Ludmila Engquist (SWE)	93
1997	Wilson Kipketer (DEN)	114	Astrid Kumbernuss (GER)	99
1998	Hicham El Guerrouj (MAR)	136	Marion Jones (USA)	130
1999	Bernard Barmasai (KEN)	111	Gabriela Szabo (ROM)	108
2000	Angelo Taylor (USA)	101	Trine Hattestad (NOR)	110
2001	André Bucher (SUI)	102	Violeta Szekely (ROM)	116
2002	Hicham El Guerrouj (MAR)	116	Marion Jones (USA)	116
