= 1999 IAAF Grand Prix =

- Edition: 15th
- Dates: 25 February – 11 September
- Meetings: 28 (+1 final)

The 1999 IAAF Grand Prix was the fifteenth edition of the annual global series of one-day track and field competitions organized by the International Association of Athletics Federations (IAAF). The series was divided into four levels: 1999 IAAF Golden League, Grand Prix I and Grand Prix II, and IAAF Permit Meetings. There were seven IAAF Golden League meetings, Grand Prix I featured 10 meetings from 25 April to 8 August and Grand Prix II featured 11 meetings from 25 February to 5 September, making a combined total of 28 meetings for the series. Athletes could also score additional points at IAAF Permit Meetings.

Compared to the previous season, the Johannesburg meet was replaced by Roodepoort, and the Tsiklitiria meet in Greece and Weltklasse in Köln in Germany were included for the first time. The Qatar International Athletic Meet was promoted to Grand Prix I status and the Paris Meeting Gaz de France was promoted to IAAF Golden League status. The British Grand Prix meet moved from Sheffield to London.

Performances on designated events on the circuit earned athletes points which qualified them for entry to the 1999 IAAF Grand Prix Final, held on 11 September in Munich, Germany. Steeplechaser Bernard Barmasai was the points leader for the series, taking 111 points from eight meetings (a new record for the series). The highest scoring female athletes were distance runners Gabriela Szabo and Maria Mutola, both of whom scored 108 points. Greek men's javelin thrower Konstadinos Gatsioudis had the second highest individual score with 109.

== Meetings ==
#	Date	Meeting name	City	Country	Level
1	25 February	Melbourne Track Classic	Melbourne	Australia	IAAF Grand Prix II
2	19 March	Engen Grand Prix Summer Series	Roodepoort	South Africa	IAAF Grand Prix II
3	25 April	Grand Prix Brasil de Atletismo	Rio de Janeiro	Brazil	IAAF Grand Prix I
4	8 May	Japan Grand Prix	Osaka	Japan	IAAF Grand Prix I
5	13 May	Qatar International Athletic Meet	Doha	Qatar	IAAF Grand Prix I
6	22 May	US Open Meet	St. Louis	United States	IAAF Grand Prix I
7	28 May	Gran Premio Diputacion	Seville	Spain	IAAF Grand Prix II
8	30 May	Prefontaine Classic	Eugene	United States	IAAF Grand Prix I
9	30 May	Adriaan Paulen Memorial	Hengelo	Netherlands	IAAF Grand Prix II
10	8 June	Cena Slovenska – Slovak Gold	Bratislava	Slovakia	IAAF Grand Prix II
11	10 June	Ericsson GP	Helsinki	Finland	IAAF Grand Prix II
12	16 June	Tsiklitiria	Athens	Greece	IAAF Grand Prix II
13	27 June	British IAAF Grand Prix II	Gateshead	United Kingdom	IAAF Grand Prix II
14	30 June	Bislett Games	Oslo	Norway	1999 IAAF Golden League
15	2 July	Athletissima	Lausanne	Switzerland	IAAF Grand Prix I
16	3 July	Meeting Gaz de France Saint-Denis	Saint-Denis	France	IAAF Grand Prix II
17	7 July	Golden Gala	Rome	Italy	1999 IAAF Golden League
18	17 July	Nikaia	Nice	France	IAAF Grand Prix I
19	21 July	Meeting de Paris	Paris	France	1999 IAAF Golden League
20	26 July	Zipfer Gugl Grand Prix	Linz	Austria	IAAF Grand Prix II
21	30 July	DN Galan	Stockholm	Sweden	IAAF Grand Prix I
22	4 August	Herculis	Monte Carlo	Monaco	1999 IAAF Golden League
23	7 August	British Grand Prix	London	United Kingdom	IAAF Grand Prix I
24	8 August	Weltklasse in Köln	Cologne	Germany	IAAF Grand Prix I
25	11 August	Weltklasse Zürich	Zürich	Switzerland	1999 IAAF Golden League
26	3 September	Memorial Van Damme	Brussels	Belgium	1999 IAAF Golden League
27	5 September	Rieti Meeting	Rieti	Italy	IAAF Grand Prix II
28	7 September	ISTAF Berlin	Berlin	Germany	1999 IAAF Golden League
F	11 September	1999 IAAF Grand Prix Final	Munich	Germany	IAAF Grand Prix Final

== Points standings ==
=== Overall men ===
Rank	Athlete	Nation	Meets	Points
1	Bernard Barmasai	Kenya	8	111
2	Konstadinos Gatsioudis	Greece	8	109
3	Wilson Kipketer	Denmark	7	108
4	Maksim Tarasov	Russia	8	107
5	Noah Ngeny	Kenya	8	104
6	Mark Crear	United States	8	104
7	James Beckford	Jamaica	8	100
8	Benjamin Limo	Kenya	8	99
9	Larry Wade	United States	8	95
10	Jeff Hartwig	United States	8	93
11	Hezekiél Sepeng	South Africa	8	92
12	Raymond Hecht	Germany	8	91
13	Lars Riedel	Germany	7	87
14	Claudinei da Silva	Brazil	7	84
15	Sergey Makarov	Russia	8	81
16	Japheth Kimutai	Kenya	7	77
17	Jürgen Schult	Germany	8	76
18	Obadele Thompson	Barbados	7	75
19	Christopher Koskei	Kenya	8	74
20	Laban Rotich	Kenya	8	71
21	Virgilijus Alekna	Lithuania	6	71
22	Younès Moudrik	Morocco	7	71
23	Boris Henry	Germany	8	71
24	Jan Železný	Czech Republic	6	70
25	Paul Malakwen Kosgei	Kenya	8	68
26	Paul Bitok	Kenya	7	68
27	Nick Hysong	United States	8	68
28	Hicham El Guerrouj	Morocco	5	68
29	Tim Lobinger	Germany	8	67.5
30	Ali Ezzine	Morocco	6	67
31	Florian Schwarthoff	Germany	7	66
32	Kennedy Kimwetich	Kenya	8	66
33	Maurice Greene	United States	4	65
34	Kipkurui Misoi	Kenya	8	65
35	Dmitri Markov	Australia	8	65
36	William Chirchir	Kenya	8	65
37	Iván Pedroso	Cuba	4	64
38	Kareem Streete-Thompson	Cayman Islands	8	64
39	Colin Jackson	United Kingdom	6	63
40	Erick Walder	United States	5	63
41	Anthony Washington	United States	5	62
42	Daniel Komen	Kenya	7	62
43	Aki Parviainen	Finland	7	60
44	Duane Ross	United States	8	59
45	Francis Obikwelu	Nigeria	5	58
46	Tony Dees	United States	8	57
47	Bernard Lagat	Kenya	5	56
48	Salah Hissou	Morocco	7	56
49	Michael Möllenbeck	Germany	8	55
50	Kevin Little	United States	8	55
51	Allen Johnson	United States	7	54
52	Jean Galfione	France	8	53.3
53	Robin Korving	Netherlands	6	53
54	Richard Limo	Kenya	6	52
55	David Kiptoo	Kenya	6	52
56	Peter Blank	Germany	8	52
57	Jai Taurima	Australia	8	52
58	Danny Ecker	Germany	7	51.5
59	Frankie Fredericks	Namibia	4	50
60	Gregor Cankar	Slovenia	6	50
61	Mohammed Mourhit	Belgium	5	49
62	Patrick Stevens	Belgium	7	49
63	Sammy Kipketer	Kenya	4	45
64	David Lelei	Kenya	6	45
65	Roland McGhee	United States	6	45
66	Tom Pukstys	United States	8	44
67	Wilson Boit Kipketer	Kenya	4	43
68	André Bucher	Switzerland	4	43
69	Andy Bloom	United States	5	43
70	William Tanui	Kenya	6	42
71	Steve Holman	United States	8	42
72	Haile Gebrselassie	Ethiopia	5	42
73	Frantz Kruger	South Africa	6	41
74	Elarbi Khattabi	Morocco	5	40
75	Dudley Dorival	Haiti	8	40
76	Pål Arne Fagernes	Norway	7	40
77	Andrei Tivontchik	Germany	4	38
78	Steve Backley	United Kingdom	6	38
79	David Krummenacker	United States	6	37
80	Ali Saïdi-Sief	Algeria	7	37
81	Jon Drummond	United States	4	36
82	Luke Kipkosgei	Kenya	4	35
83	Moses Kiptanui	Kenya	5	32
84	Rohsaan Griffin	United States	7	32
84	Igor Potapovich	Kazakhstan	8	32
86	John Mayock	United Kingdom	6	31
87	Vadim Strogalev	Russia	6	31
88	Michael Johnson	United States	3	29
88	Bob Kennedy (runner)	United States	5	29
88	Tony McCall	United States	5	29
91	Sergey Lyakhov	Russia	6	28
92	Lawrence Johnson	United States	4	28
92	Koji Ito	Japan	5	28
94	Julius Chelule	Kenya	5	27
95	Jonathan Kandie	Kenya	5	27
96	John Godina	United States	4	27
96	Driss Maazouzi	France	4	27
98	Michael Stolle	Germany	5	26.3
99	Ismaïl Sghyr	Morocco	4	26
100	Rui Silva	Portugal	3	26
100	Johan Botha	South Africa	4	26
100	Julian Golding	United Kingdom	5	26

=== Overall women ===
Rank	Athlete	Nation	Meets	Points
1	Gabriela Szabo	Romania	7	108
2	Maria Mutola	Mozambique	8	108
3	Deon Hemmings	Jamaica	8	104
4	Svetlana Masterkova	Russia	8	99
5	Zahra Ouaziz	Morocco	8	97
6	Hestrie Cloete	South Africa	8	97
7	Paraskevi Tsiamita	Greece	8	92
8	Inger Miller	United States	8	89.5
9	Sandra Glover	United States	8	86
10	Nezha Bidouane	Morocco	8	83
11	Beverly McDonald	Jamaica	8	82.5
12	Andrea Blackett	Barbados	8	81
13	Tetyana Tereshchuk-Antipova	Ukraine	8	81
14	Savatheda Fynes	Bahamas	8	81
15	Ludmila Formanová	Czech Republic	8	80
16	Inha Babakova	Ukraine	6	76
17	Marion Jones	United States	7	76
18	Debbie Ferguson	Bahamas	8	75
19	Monica Iagăr	Romania	8	75
20	Yelena Yelesina	Russia	8	73
21	Merlene Frazer	Jamaica	8	72
22	Violeta Szekely	Romania	5	71
23	Astrid Kumbernuss	Germany	6	68
24	Zuzana Hlavoňová	Czech Republic	7	67.5
25	Nadine Kleinert	Germany	6	67
26	Natalya Tsyganova	Russia	7	65
27	Ashia Hansen	United Kingdom	7	63
28	Yelena Gulyayeva	Russia	8	62.5
29	Michelle Johnson	United States	8	61
30	Iva Prandzheva	Bulgaria	7	60
31	Stephanie Graf	Austria	6	60
32	Olena Hovorova	Ukraine	7	59
33	Anita Weyermann	Switzerland	5	59
34	Ionela Târlea	Romania	7	57
35	Tegla Loroupe	Kenya	7	55
36	Svetlana Lapina	Russia	8	55
37	Debbie-Ann Parris	Jamaica	8	52
38	Hanne Haugland	Norway	8	52
39	Connie Price-Smith	United States	5	52
40	Cristina Nicolau	Romania	7	51
41	Valentina Fedyushina	Austria	7	51
42	Paula Radcliffe	United Kingdom	6	49
43	Tatyana Lebedeva	Russia	4	48
44	Krystyna Zabawska	Poland	5	48
45	Leah Malot	Kenya	6	47
46	Lidia Chojecka	Poland	7	47
46	Fernanda Ribeiro	Portugal	7	47
48	Letitia Vriesde	Suriname	6	45
49	Kristina da Fonseca-Wollheim	Germany	5	44
50	Teri Steer	United States	5	43
51	Mariya Pantyukhova	Russia	5	42
52	Fatima Yusuf	Nigeria	5	39
53	Juliet Campbell	Jamaica	7	39
54	Kajsa Bergqvist	Sweden	6	38.5
55	Lieja Koeman	Netherlands	8	38
56	Carla Sacramento	Portugal	5	38
56	Tina Paulino	Mozambique	7	38
58	Yelena Lebedenko	Russia	7	37
59	Jackline Maranga	Kenya	4	37
60	Jearl Miles Clark	United States	5	37
61	Tereza Marinova	Bulgaria	5	36
61	Guðrún Arnardóttir	Iceland	7	36
63	Irina Mikitenko	Germany	2	35
64	Olga Komyagina	Russia	5	35
65	Tressa Thompson	United States	6	35
66	Yamilé Aldama	Cuba	4	34
67	Natalya Torshina	Kazakhstan	8	33
68	Yamna Oubouhou	France	6	30
69	Hasna Benhassi	Morocco	4	30
70	Zhanna Tarnopolskaya-Pintusevich	Ukraine	4	29
71	Susanthika Jayasinghe	Sri Lanka	4	26
72	Diane Modahl	United Kingdom	4	26
73	Tisha Waller	United States	4	26
73	Šárka Kašpárková	Czech Republic	5	26
75	Meredith Rainey-Valmon	United States	4	25
76	Mame Tacko Diouf	Senegal	6	25
76	Susan Smith-Walsh	Ireland	7	25
78	Svetlana Krivelyova	Russia	3	24
79	Gete Wami	Ethiopia	3	23
79	Cheri Goddard-Kenah	United States	4	23
81	Chandra Sturrup	Bahamas	5	22
81	Gundega Sproģe	Latvia	6	22
83	Anna Jakubczak	Poland	3	21
83	Irina Mistyukevich	Russia	3	21
83	Olga Nelyubova	Russia	3	21
86	Asmae Leghzaoui	Morocco	3	20
86	Nouria Mérah-Benida	Algeria	5	20
86	Leah Pells	Canada	5	20
89	Elena Hila	Romania	4	19
89	Kelly Holmes	United Kingdom	4	19
91	Kim Batten	United States	3	18
92	Yanina Korolchik	Belarus	3	17
92	Olga Yegorova	Russia	3	17
92	Margarita Marusova	Russia	4	17
95	Amy Acuff	United States	4	15.5
96	Andrea Philipp	Germany	2	15
96	Marina Bastos	Portugal	3	15
96	Daimí Pernía	Cuba	3	15
99	Kathy Harris-Rounds	United States	2	14
99	Ebru Kavaklıoğlu	Turkey	2	14
99	Olga Vasdeki	Greece	2	14
99	Joetta Clark	United States	3	14
99	Carmen Wüstenhagen	Germany	3	14
99	Yelena Martson-Buzhenko	Ukraine	4	14
