= 2000 IAAF Grand Prix =

- Edition: 16th
- Dates: 13 February – 5 October
- Meetings: 26 (+1 final)

The 2000 IAAF Grand Prix was the sixteenth edition of the annual global series of one-day track and field competitions organized by the International Association of Athletics Federations (IAAF). The series was divided into four levels: 2000 IAAF Golden League, Grand Prix I and Grand Prix II, and IAAF Permit Meetings. There were seven Golden League meetings, Grand Prix I featured 9 meetings from 13 May to 5 August and Grand Prix II featured 10 meetings from 2 March to 3 September, making a combined total of 26 meetings for the series. An additional 13 IAAF Outdoor Permit Meetings were attached to the circuit.

Compared to the previous season, the South African meet was moved from Roodepoort to Pretoria, and the Pontiac Grand Prix Invitational and IAAF Meeting Zagreb were included for the first time. The Tsiklitiria meet was promoted to Grand Prix I status. Four meetings were dropped from the calendar: the Qatar International Athletic Meet (not held that year), the St. Louis US Open Meet, the Meeting Gaz de France Saint-Denis and Weltklasse in Köln.

Performances on designated events on the circuit earned athletes points which qualified them for entry to the 2000 IAAF Grand Prix Final, held on 5 October in Doha, Qatar. Javelin thrower Trine Hattestad was the points leader for the series, taking 110 points from eight meetings. This was the second highest total ever for the circuit and the first time a woman led the rankings. The highest scoring male athlete was hurdler Angelo Taylor, who scored 101 points. Americans Marion Jones and Gail Devers were the other athletes to amass over 100 points, each with a total of 104.

== Meetings ==
| # | Date | Meeting name | City | Country | Level |
|---|---|---|---|---|---|
| – | 13 February | Sydney Track Classic | Sydney | Australia | IAAF Permit Meeting |
| 1 | 2 March | Melbourne Track Classic | Melbourne | Australia | IAAF Grand Prix II |
| 2 | 24 March | Engen Grand Prix | Pretoria | South Africa | IAAF Grand Prix II |
| – | 31 March | Engen Grand Prix Final | Cape Town | South Africa | IAAF Permit Meeting |
| – | 29 April | Meeting du Conseil Général de Martinique | Fort-de-France | Martinique | IAAF Permit Meeting |
| 3 | 13 May | Japan Grand Prix | Osaka | Japan | IAAF Grand Prix I |
| 4 | 14 May | Grand Prix Brasil de Atletismo | Rio de Janeiro | Brazil | IAAF Grand Prix I |
| 5 | 28 May | Adriaan Paulen Memorial | Hengelo | Netherlands | IAAF Grand Prix II |
| – | 7 June | Notturna di Milano | Milan | Italy | IAAF Permit Meeting |
| 6 | 9 June | Gran Premio Diputacion | Seville | Spain | IAAF Grand Prix II |
| – | 10 June | Meeting di Atletica Leggera Torino | Turin | Italy | IAAF Permit Meeting |
| 7 | 15 June | Ericsson GP | Helsinki | Finland | IAAF Grand Prix II |
| 8 | 17 June | Pontiac Grand Prix Invitational | Raleigh | United States | IAAF Grand Prix I |
| – | 17 June | Meeting Lille-Métropole | Lille | France | IAAF Permit Meeting |
| – | 18 June | Znamensky Memorial | Saint Petersburg | Russia | IAAF Permit Meeting |
| 9 | 22 June | Cena Slovenska - Slovak Gold | Bratislava | Slovakia | IAAF Grand Prix II |
| 10 | 23 June | Meeting de Paris | Paris | France | 2000 IAAF Golden League |
| 11 | 24 June | Prefontaine Classic | Eugene | United States | IAAF Grand Prix I |
| – | 25 June | Live Leichtathletikfest Nuremberg | Nuremberg | Germany | IAAF Permit Meeting |
| – | 25 June | Adidas Oregon Track Classic | Portland | United States | IAAF Permit Meeting |
| 12 | 28 June | Tsiklitiria | Athens | Greece | IAAF Grand Prix I |
| 13 | 30 June | Golden Gala | Rome | Italy | 2000 IAAF Golden League |
| 14 | 3 July | IAAF Meeting Zagreb | Zagreb | Croatia | IAAF Grand Prix II |
| 15 | 5 July | Athletissima | Lausanne | Switzerland | IAAF Grand Prix I |
| 16 | 8 July | Nikaia | Nice | France | IAAF Grand Prix I |
| – | 22 July | IAAF Permit Meeting Budapest | Budapest | Hungary | IAAF Permit Meeting |
| – | 25 July | Adidas - Ciutat de Barcelona | Barcelona | Spain | IAAF Permit Meeting |
| 17 | 28 July | Bislett Games | Oslo | Norway | 2000 IAAF Golden League |
| 18 | 1 August | DN Galan | Stockholm | Sweden | IAAF Grand Prix I |
| 19 | 5 August | Norwich Union British Grand Prix | London | United Kingdom | IAAF Grand Prix I |
| 20 | 8 August | Gugl Grand Prix | Linz | Austria | IAAF Grand Prix II |
| 21 | 11 August | Weltklasse Zürich | Zürich | Switzerland | 2000 IAAF Golden League |
| 22 | 18 August | Herculis | Monte Carlo | Monaco | 2000 IAAF Golden League |
| 23 | 25 August | Memorial Van Damme | Brussels | Belgium | 2000 IAAF Golden League |
| 24 | 28 August | CGU Classic | Gateshead | United Kingdom | IAAF Grand Prix II |
| – | 30 August | International Olympic Meeting | Thessaloniki | Greece | IAAF Permit Meeting |
| 25 | 1 September | ISTAF Berlin | Berlin | Germany | 2000 IAAF Golden League |
| 26 | 3 September | Rieti Meeting | Rieti | Italy | IAAF Grand Prix II |
| – | 9 September | Super Track & Field Meet | Yokohama | Japan | IAAF Permit Meeting |
| F | 5 October | 2000 IAAF Grand Prix Final | Doha | Qatar | IAAF Grand Prix Final |

== Points standings ==
=== Overall men ===
| Rank | Athlete | Nation | Meets | Points |
|---|---|---|---|---|
| 1 | Angelo Taylor | United States | 9 | 101 |
| 2 | Yuriy Bilonoh | Ukraine | 9 | 94 |
| 3 | Adam Nelson | United States | 8 | 93 |
| 4 | Nick Hysong | United States | 9 | 86.5 |
| 5 | Bernard Lagat | Kenya | 8 | 78 |
| 6 | Tim Lobinger | Germany | 9 | 77.5 |
| 7 | Eric Thomas | United States | 9 | 77 |
| 8 | Maurice Greene | United States | 8 | 77 |
| 9 | Samuel Matete | Zambia | 9 | 75 |
| 10 | Luke Kipkosgei | Kenya | 9 | 75 |
| 11 | Vyacheslav Voronin | Russia | 7 | 74 |
| 12 | Llewellyn Herbert | South Africa | 7 | 74 |
| 13 | Ali Saïdi-Sief | Algeria | 6 | 74 |
| 14 | Okkert Brits | South Africa | 9 | 74 |
| 15 | Hicham El Guerrouj | Morocco | 7 | 73 |
| 16 | Brian Lewis | United States | 9 | 72.5 |
| 17 | Sammy Kipketer | Kenya | 8 | 72 |
| 18 | Ato Boldon | Trinidad and Tobago | 8 | 71.5 |
| 19 | Maksim Tarasov | Russia | 8 | 71 |
| 20 | Tim Montgomery | United States | 8 | 70 |
| 21 | Hadi Soua'an Al-Somaily | Saudi Arabia | 8 | 69 |
| 22 | Miroslav Menc | Czech Republic | 9 | 69 |
| 23 | Kwaku Boateng | Canada | 9 | 69 |
| 24 | Noah Ngeny | Kenya | 6 | 66 |
| 25 | Darren Campbell | United Kingdom | 8 | 66 |
| 26 | Sergey Klyugin | Russia | 9 | 65 |
| 27 | Staffan Strand | Sweden | 9 | 64.5 |
| 28 | C. J. Hunter | United States | 7 | 64 |
| 29 | Andy Bloom | United States | 8 | 63 |
| 30 | Nathan Leeper | United States | 8 | 62.5 |
| 31 | Jeff Hartwig | United States | 9 | 62.5 |
| 32 | Oliver-Sven Buder | Germany | 9 | 62 |
| 33 | Daniel Komen | Kenya | 7 | 60 |
| 33 | Brahim Lahlafi | Morocco | 7 | 60 |
| 35 | Koji Murofushi | Japan | 7 | 58 |
| 36 | William Chirchir | Kenya | 6 | 58 |
| 37 | John Godina | United States | 6 | 57 |
| 38 | Jonathan Edwards | United Kingdom | 5 | 57 |
| 39 | Burger Lambrechts | South Africa | 9 | 57 |
| 40 | Benjamin Kipkurui | Kenya | 8 | 56 |
| 41 | Vyacheslav Shabunin | Russia | 8 | 56 |
| 42 | Dragutin Topić | Yugoslavia | 7 | 56 |
| 43 | Eronilde de Araújo | Brazil | 8 | 56 |
| 44 | Mark Richardson | United Kingdom | 5 | 54 |
| 45 | Kevin Sullivan | Canada | 6 | 54 |
| 45 | Tibor Gécsek | Hungary | 8 | 54 |
| 47 | Rostislav Dimitrov | Bulgaria | 5 | 52 |
| 48 | Greg Saddler | United States | 6 | 52 |
| 49 | Onochie Achike | United Kingdom | 7 | 52 |
| 50 | Charles Austin | United States | 8 | 5 |

=== Overall women ===
| Rank | Athlete | Nation | Meets | Points |
|---|---|---|---|---|
| 1 | Trine Hattestad | Norway | 8 | 110 |
| 2 | Marion Jones | United States | 9 | 104 |
| 3 | Gail Devers | United States | 9 | 104 |
| 4 | Violeta Szekely | Romania | 9 | 94 |
| 5 | Glory Alozie | Nigeria | 9 | 91 |
| 6 | Osleidys Menéndez | Cuba | 9 | 90 |
| 7 | Tatyana Shikolenko | Russia | 9 | 88 |
| 8 | Fiona May | Italy | 9 | 83 |
| 9 | Delloreen Ennis-London | Jamaica | 9 | 81 |
| 10 | Kutre Dulecha | Ethiopia | 7 | 81 |
| 11 | Chryste Gaines | United States | 9 | 78 |
| 12 | Savatheda Fynes | Bahamas | 9 | 76.5 |
| 13 | Tatyana Kotova | Russia | 7 | 75 |
| 14 | Dawn Burrell | United States | 9 | 75 |
| 15 | Heike Drechsler | Germany | 7 | 73 |
| 16 | Lorraine Graham | Jamaica | 8 | 73 |
| 17 | Melissa Morrison | United States | 9 | 71 |
| 18 | Erica Johansson | Sweden | 9 | 71 |
| 19 | Zhanna Tarnopolskaya-Pintusevich | Ukraine | 8 | 70.5 |
| 20 | Lidia Chojecka | Poland | 6 | 68 |
| 21 | Michelle Freeman | Jamaica | 9 | 67 |
| 22 | Niurka Montalvo | Spain | 8 | 65 |
| 23 | Debbie Ferguson | Bahamas | 9 | 64 |
| 24 | Chandra Sturrup | Bahamas | 9 | 63.5 |
| 25 | Falilat Ogunkoya | Nigeria | 8 | 63 |
| 26 | Sonia Bisset | Cuba | 7 | 60 |
| 27 | Sonia O'Sullivan | Ireland | 7 | 60 |
| 28 | Franka Dietzsch | Germany | 6 | 59 |
| 29 | Nouria Mérah-Benida | Algeria | 6 | 59 |
| 30 | Cathy Freeman | Australia | 6 | 57 |
| 31 | Lydia Cheromei | Kenya | 7 | 55 |
| 32 | Olga Shishigina | Kazakhstan | 7 | 55 |
| 33 | Olga Nelyubova | Russia | 8 | 54 |
| 34 | Carla Sacramento | Portugal | 6 | 52 |
| 35 | Sharon Couch | United States | 8 | 50 |
| 36 | Tegla Loroupe | Kenya | 7 | 50 |
| 37 | Torri Edwards | United States | 9 | 50 |
| 38 | Nicoleta Grasu | Romania | 6 | 49 |
| 39 | Leah Malot | Kenya | 5 | 48 |
| 40 | Ellina Zvereva | Belarus | 5 | 48 |
| 41 | Inger Miller | United States | 7 | 47.5 |
| 42 | Iva Prandzheva | Bulgaria | 7 | 47 |
| 43 | Nikola Tomecková | Czech Republic | 6 | 43 |
| 44 | Beatrice Faumuina | New Zealand | 5 | 43 |
| 45 | Lisa-Marie Vizaniari | Australia | 5 | 43 |
| 46 | Tanja Damaske | Germany | 5 | 43 |
| 47 | Sandie Richards | Jamaica | 6 | 42 |
| 48 | Ana Guevara | Mexico | 5 | 42 |
| 49 | Yekaterina Ivakina | Russia | 7 | 40 |
| 50 | Steffi Nerius | Germany | 6 | 38 |
| 51 | Christine Arron | France | 5 | 38 |
| 51 | Anjanette Kirkland | United States | 5 | 38 |
