= IAAF Golden League =

Former athletics league

- Sport: Outdoor track and field
- Founded: 1998
- Ceased: 2009
- Continent: Europe

The IAAF Golden League was an annual series of outdoor track and field meetings organised by the International Association of Athletics Federations (IAAF). Athletes who won specific events at all of the series meetings were awarded a jackpot prize, sometimes given in gold bars, which inspired the series name. The competition began with seven meetings and it lasted for twelve years as the IAAF's top tier of one-day meetings. Within the IAAF's global circuit, athletes received additional points for their performances at the Golden League for the IAAF Grand Prix (1998–2002), IAAF World Outdoor Meetings (2003–2005), then IAAF World Athletics Tour (2006–2009). The Golden League was replaced in 2010 by the Diamond League, which marked an expansion to fourteen seasonal meetings covering all track and field events except the hammer throw.

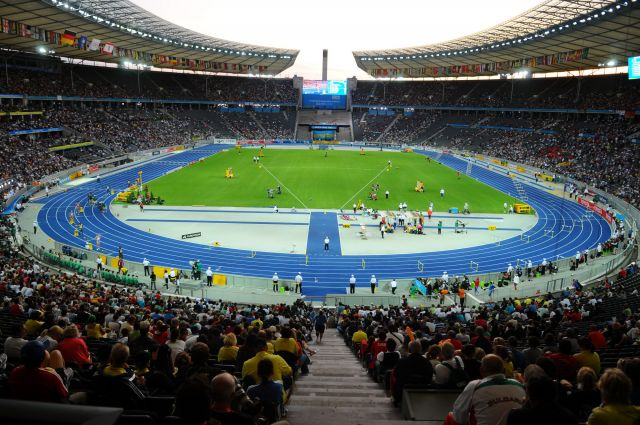
The Olympiastadion in Berlin, which hosted the ISTAF Berlin

The origins of the Golden League trace back to the Golden Four series that ran from 1993 to 1997, comprising four top level European meetings on the IAAF Grand Prix circuit (Berlin, Brussels, Oslo, and Zürich). The first Golden League was held as the new top tier of the 1998 IAAF Grand Prix and consisted of the former Golden Four meetings, plus Rome, Monaco, and the 1998 IAAF Grand Prix Final in Moscow. From the 1999 IAAF Golden League onwards, the Meeting Gaz de France in Paris was added and the Grand Prix Final dropped. That year all meetings were scheduled for Wednesday evenings in order to improve the sport's television coverage. When the IAAF Grand Prix was succeeded by the IAAF World Outdoor Meetings series in 2003, the Monaco meeting was removed from the Golden League series and made host of the IAAF World Athletics Final instead. The Golden League meetings remained unchanged from 2003 to 2009.

The series had three title sponsors in its history, starting with Ericsson in 1998, TDK in 2004 and 2005, then ÅF in 2008 and 2009.

== Editions ==
Edition	Year	Start date	End date	Meets	Jackpot events	Oslo	Rome	Paris	Monaco	Zürich	Brussels	Berlin	GP Final	Series	Ref.
1	1998	9 July	1 September	7	12	1	2	—	3	4	5	6	7	1998 IAAF Grand Prix	
2	1999	30 June	7 September	7	12	1	2	3	4	5	6	7	—	1999 IAAF Grand Prix	
3	2000	23 June	1 September	7	12	3	2	1	5	4	6	7	—	2000 IAAF Grand Prix	
4	2001	29 June	31 August	7	14	3	1	2	4	5	6	7	—	2001 IAAF Grand Prix	
5	2002	28 June	6 September	7	12	1	3	2	4	5	6	7	—	2002 IAAF Grand Prix	
6	2003	27 June	5 September	6	12	1	3	2	—	4	5	6	—	2003 IAAF World Outdoor Meetings	
7	2004	11 June	12 September	6	12	1	2	3	—	4	5	6	—	2004 IAAF World Outdoor Meetings	
8	2005	1 July	4 September	6	11	3	2	1	—	4	5	6	—	2005 IAAF World Outdoor Meetings	
9	2006	2 June	3 September	6	11	1	3	2	—	4	5	6	—	2006 IAAF World Athletics Tour	
10	2007	15 June	16 September	6	10	1	3	2	—	4	5	6	—	2007 IAAF World Athletics Tour	
11	2008	1 June	5 September	6	10	2	3	4	—	5	6	1	—	2008 IAAF World Athletics Tour	
12	2009	14 June	4 September	6	10	2	3	4	—	5	6	1	—	2009 IAAF World Athletics Tour	

== Meetings ==
#	Meeting	Arena	City	Country	1998	1999	2000	2001	2002	2003	2004	2005	2006	2007	2008	2009
12	Bislett Games	Bislett Stadium	Oslo	Norway	•	•	•	•	•	•	•	•	•	•	•	•
12	Weltklasse Zürich	Letzigrund	Zürich	Switzerland	•	•	•	•	•	•	•	•	•	•	•	•
12	Memorial Van Damme	King Baudouin Stadium	Brussels	Belgium	•	•	•	•	•	•	•	•	•	•	•	•
12	ISTAF Berlin	Olympiastadion	Berlin	Germany	•	•	•	•	•	•	•	•	•	•	•	•
12	Golden Gala	Stadio Olimpico	Rome	Italy	•	•	•	•	•	•	•	•	•	•	•	•
11	Meeting Areva	Stade de France	Paris	France		•	•	•	•	•	•	•	•	•	•	•
5	Herculis	Stade Louis II	Fontvieille	Monaco	•	•	•	•	•							
1	IAAF Grand Prix Final	Luzhniki Stadium	Moscow	Russia	•											

- In 2004, the Bislett Games were moved from Oslo to the Fana Stadion in Bergen due to the redevelopment of the Bislett Stadium. The renovation was a requirement to its maintaining Golden League status.

The locations of the meetings from 2005 onwards

== Jackpot ==
=== Rules ===
The jackpot and its eligibility rules changed through the competition's history. Each year, a number of men's and women's events were made eligible for the Golden League jackpot if an athlete won their event at all Golden League meetings. This ranged from five to eight men's events and five to six women's events for each year. In the first two years, jackpot winners shared in a US$1 million prize. In 2000 and 2001, this was changed to 50 kg of gold bars and athletes only had to win at 5 out of 7 meetings to qualify for the jackpot. In 2003, the prize structure reverted to US$1 million for athletes winning at all the meets only, and a new stipulation was that athletes also had to compete at the IAAF World Athletics Final.

From 2006 onwards, the jackpot events were set to five men's events and five women's events, ensuring gender equality. The award structure was also changed in 2006 so that athletes who won any five of the six events shared in a purse of US$250,000, while the remaining US$750,000 would be divided among athletes who won all six meetings. This was to a response to the fact that only four athletes shared in the jackpot in the three previous seasons. From 2007 onwards, the jackpot was again only shared amongst athletes who won at all six meetings.

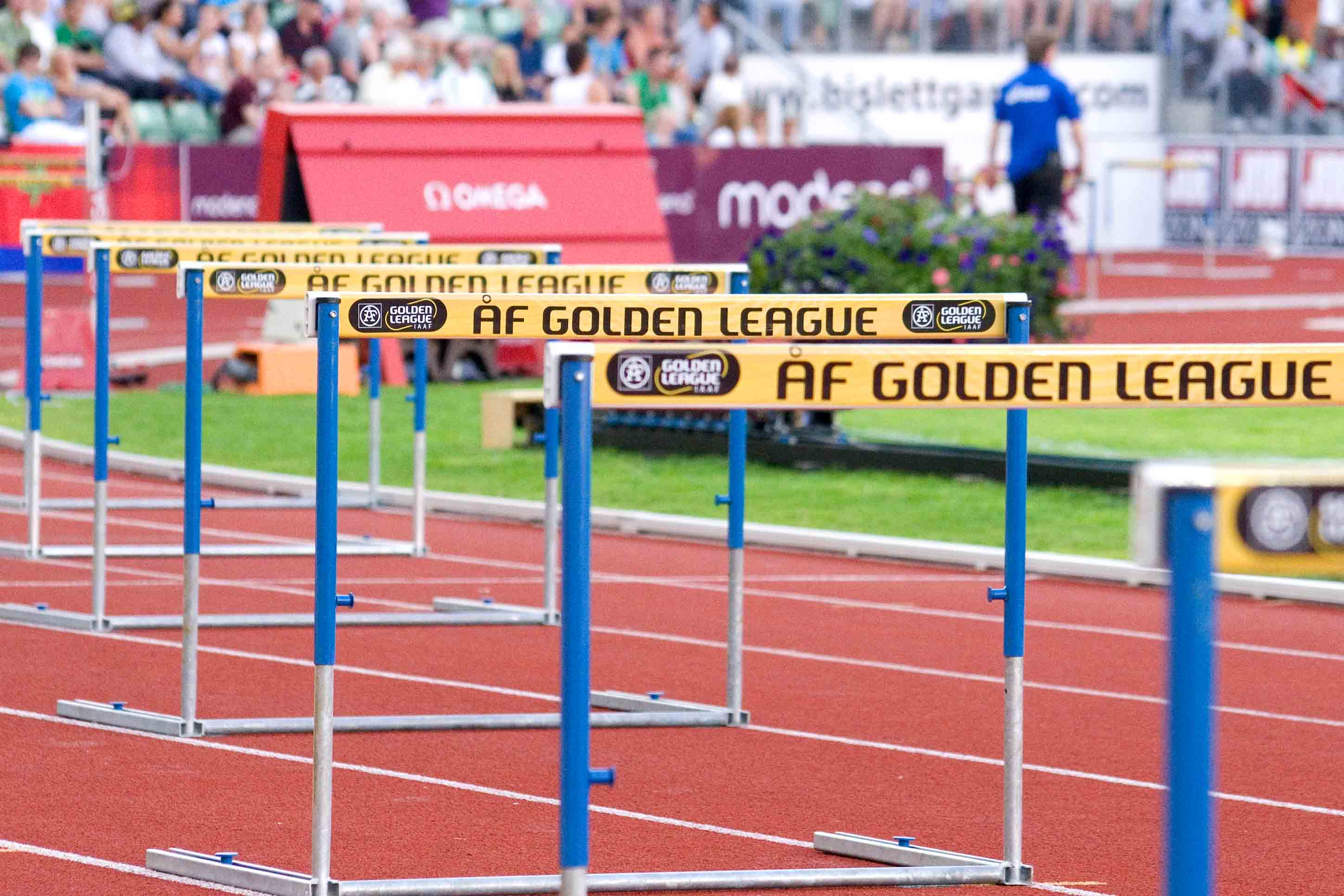
Hurdles at the Bislett Games, one of the Golden League meets

=== Events ===
Jackpot event with no winner
Jackpot event with winner

Men
Event	1998	1999	2000	2001	2002	2003	2004	2005	2006	2007	2008	2009	Total	Winners
100 m			(United States) Greene						(Jamaica) Powell				10	2
200 m													2	-
400 m									(United States) Wariner				4	2
800 m		(Denmark) Kipketer		(Switzerland) Bucher									5	2
1500 m/Mile	(Morocco) El Guerrouj		(Morocco) El Guerrouj	(Morocco) El Guerrouj	(Morocco) El Guerrouj								9	4
3000 m/5000 m									(Ethiopia) Bekele			(Ethiopia) Bekele	6	2
5000 m/10,000 m	(Ethiopia) Gebrselassie												1	1
110 m hurdles				(United States) Johnson									6	1
400 m hurdles					(Dominican Republic) Sánchez								5	1
3000 m s'chase													2	-
High jump													2	-
Pole vault													5	-
Long jump									(Panama) Saladino				4	1
Triple jump							(Sweden) Olsson						4	1
Shot put													1	-
Discus throw													1	-
Javelin throw													8	-
Total	7	7	7	8	6	6	6	6	6	5	6	5	75	
Winners	2	1	2	3	2	-	1	-	4	-	-	1	16	

Women
Event	1998	1999	2000	2001	2002	2003	2004	2005	2006	2007	2008	2009	Total	Winners
100 m	(United States) Jones			(United States) Jones	(United States) Jones								10	3
200 m													2	-
400 m					(Mexico) Guevara		(The Bahamas) Williams		(United States) Richards	(United States) Richards		(United States) Richards	6	5
800 m						(Mozambique) Mutola					(Kenya) Jelimo		5	2
1500 m/Mile				(Romania) Szekely									6	1
3000 m/5000 m		(Romania) Szabó		(Russia) Yegorova					(Ethiopia) Dibaba				6	3
5000 m/10,000 m													-	-
100 m hurdles													8	-
400 m hurdles													4	-
3000 m s'chase													-	-
High jump													8	-
Pole vault										(Russia) Isinbayeva		(Russia) Isinbayeva	2	2
Long jump			(Russia) Kotova										1	1
Triple jump								(Russia) Lebedeva					2	1
Shot put													-	-
Discus throw													-	-
Javelin throw			(Norway) Hattestad										3	1
Total	5	5	5	6	6	6	6	5	5	5	4	5	63	
Winners	1	1	2	3	2	1	1	1	2	2	1	2	19	

=== Winners ===
Year	Winners	Nations	Event(s)	Prize
1998	Hicham El Guerrouj (1)	Morocco	1500 metres/mile	$333,333
1998	Haile Gebrselassie	Ethiopia	5000 metres/10,000 metres	$333,333
1998	Marion Jones	United States	100 metres	$333,333
1999	Wilson Kipketer	Denmark	800 metres	$500,000
1999	Gabriela Szabo	Romania	3000 metres/5000 metres	$500,000
2000	Hicham El Guerrouj (2)	Morocco	1500 metres/mile	12.5 kg gold bar
2000	Maurice Greene	United States	100 metres	12.5 kg gold bar
2000	Trine Hattestad	Norway	Javelin throw	12.5 kg gold bar
2000	Tatyana Kotova	Russia	Long jump	12.5 kg gold bar
2001	André Bucher	Switzerland	800 metres	8.33 kg Gold Bar
2001	Hicham El Guerrouj (3)	Morocco	1500 metres/mile/2000 metres	8.33 kg Gold Bar
2001	Allen Johnson	United States	110 metres hurdles	8.33 kg Gold Bar
2001	Marion Jones (2)	United States	100 metres	8.33 kg Gold Bar
2001	Violeta Szekely	Romania	1500 metres	8.33 kg Gold Bar
2001	Olga Yegorova	Russia	3000 metres/5000 metres	8.33 kg Gold Bar
2002	Hicham El Guerrouj (4)	Morocco	1500 metres	12.5 kg Gold Bar
2002	Ana Guevara	Mexico	400 metres	12.5 kg Gold Bar
2002	Marion Jones (3)	United States	100 metres	12.5 kg Gold Bar
2002	Félix Sánchez	Dominican Republic	400 metres hurdles	12.5 kg Gold Bar
2003	Maria Mutola	Mozambique	800 metres	$1,000,000
2004	Christian Olsson	Sweden	Triple jump	$500,000
2004	Tonique Williams-Darling	Bahamas	400 metres	$500,000
2005	Tatyana Lebedeva	Russia	Triple jump	$1,000,000
2006	Asafa Powell	Jamaica	100 metres	$249,999*
2006	Jeremy Wariner	United States	400 metres	$249,999*
2006	Sanya Richards	United States	400 metres	$249,999*
2006	Kenenisa Bekele	Ethiopia	5000 metres	$83,333*
2006	Tirunesh Dibaba	Ethiopia	5000 metres	$83,333*
2006	Irving Saladino	Panama	Long jump	$83,333*
2007	Yelena Isinbayeva	Russia	Pole vault	$500,000
2007	Sanya Richards (2)	United States	400 metres	$500,000
2008 (	Pamela Jelimo	Kenya	800 metres	$1,000,000
2009	Sanya Richards (3)	United States	400 metres	$333,333
2009	Yelena Isinbayeva (2)	Russia	Pole vault	$333,333
2009	Kenenisa Bekele (2)	Ethiopia	3000 metres/5000 metres	$333,333

- The 2006 series had a split prize pot, with US$250,000 shared between the athletes who won at five meetings, and US$750,000 being shared among athletes who won at all six meetings.

=== Events by year ===
Year	Men	Women	Total	Ref.
1998	200 metres	200 metres	13	
1998	800 metres	800 metres	13	
1998	5000 metres	3000 metres	13	
1998	110 metres hurdles	400 metres hurdles	13	
1998	3000 metres steeplechase	—	13	
1998	long jump	high jump	13	
1998	pole vault	—	13	
1998	javelin throw	—	13	
1999	200 metres	200 metres	13	
1999	800 metres	800 metres	13	
1999	5000 metres	3000 metres	13	
1999	110 metres hurdles	400 metres hurdles	13	
1999	3000 metres steeplechase	high jump	13	
1999	long jump	—	13	
1999	pole vault	—	13	
1999	javelin throw	—	13	
2000	100 metres	100 metres	12	
2000	1500 metres	1500 metres	12	
2000	3000 metres	—	12	
2000	400 metres hurdles	100 metres hurdles	12	
2000	high jump	long jump	12	
2000	pole vault	—	12	
2000	shot put	javelin throw	12	
2001	100 metres	100 metres	14	
2001	800 metres	800 metres	14	
2001	1500 metres	1500 metres	14	
2001	3000 metres	3000 metres	14	
2001	3000 metres steeplechase	—	14	
2001	110 metres hurdles	400 metres hurdles	14	
2001	long jump	high jump	14	
2001	javelin throw	—	14	
2002	100 metres	100 metres	12	
2002	—	400 metres	12	
2002	1500 metres	1500 metres	12	
2002	3000 metres/5000 metres	3000 metres/5000 metres	12	
2002	400 metres hurdles	100 metres hurdles	12	
2002	pole vault	—	12	
2002	triple jump	javelin throw	12	
2003	100 metres	100 metres	12	
2003	800 metres	800 metres	12	
2003	3000 metres/5000 metres	1500 metres	12	
2003	110 metres hurdles	400 metres hurdles	12	
2003	pole vault	triple jump	12	
2003	—	high jump	12	
2003	javelin throw	—	12	
2004	200 metres	100 metres	12	
2004	800 metres	400 metres	12	
2004	1500 metres	1500 metres	12	
2004	—	3000 metres/5000 metres	12	
2004	400 metres hurdles	100 metres hurdles	12	
2004	triple jump	high jump	12	
2004	discus throw	—	12	
2005	100 metres	100 metres	11	
2005	800 metres	800 metres	11	
2005	1500 metres/1 mile	3000 metres/5000 metres	11	
2005	110 metres hurdles	400 metres hurdles	11	
2005	high jump	triple jump	11	
2005	javelin throw	—	11	
2006	100 metres	100 metres	10	
2006	400 metres	400 metres	10	
2006	5000 metres	5000 metres	10	
2006	—	100 metres hurdles	10	
2006	long jump	high jump	10	
2006	javelin throw	—	10	
2007	100 metres	100 metres	10	
2007	1500 metres / Mile	400 metres	10	
2007	110 metres hurdles	100 metres hurdles	10	
2007	triple jump	high jump	10	
2007	—	pole vault	10	
2007	javelin throw	—	10	
2008	100 metres	200 metres	11	
2008	400 metres	—	11	
2008	1500 metres	800 metres	11	
2008	400 metres hurdles	100 metres hurdles	11	
2008	long jump	high jump	11	
2008	javelin throw	—	11	
2009	100 metres	100 metres	10	
2009	400 metres	400 metres	10	
2009	3000 metres/5000 metres	—	10	
2009	110 metres hurdles	100 metres hurdles	10	
2009	—	high jump	10	
2009	—	pole vault	10	
2009	javelin throw	—	10	
