= 2001 IAAF Grand Prix =

- Edition: 17th
- Dates: 16 February – 15 September
- Meetings: 28 (+1 final)

The 2001 IAAF Grand Prix was the seventeenth edition of the annual global series of one-day track and field competitions organized by the International Association of Athletics Federations (IAAF). The series was divided into four levels: 2001 IAAF Golden League, Grand Prix I and Grand Prix II, and IAAF Permit Meetings. There were seven Golden League meets, Grand Prix I featured 10 meetings from 6 May to 22 July and Grand Prix II featured 11 meetings from 1 March to 2 September, making a combined total of 28 meetings for the series. An additional 11 IAAF Outdoor Permit Meetings were attached to the circuit.

Compared to the previous season, the Oregon Track Classic and IAAF Grand Prix Palo Alto were included for the first time, the Qatar Athletic Grand Prix 1 was reintroduced after a year's break, and the Pontiac Grand Prix Invitational was dropped from the calendar.

Performances on designated events on the circuit earned athletes points which qualified them for entry to the 2001 IAAF Grand Prix Final, held on 9 September in Melbourne, Australia. Middle-distance runner Violeta Szekely was the points leader for the series, taking a series record high of 116 points from eight meetings. The highest scoring male athlete was middle-distance runner André Bucher, who scored 102 points. Another middle-distance runner, Maria Mutola, had the second highest with 105. Three men also reached 100 points: hurdler Allen Johnson, and distance runners Hicham El Guerrouj and Paul Bitok.

== Meetings ==
| # | Date | Meeting name | City | Country | Level |
|---|---|---|---|---|---|
| – | 16 February | Sydney Track Classic | Sydney | Australia | IAAF Permit Meeting |
| 1 | 1 March | Melbourne Track Classic | Melbourne | Australia | IAAF Grand Prix II |
| 2 | 23 March | Engen Grand Prix | Pretoria | South Africa | IAAF Grand Prix II |
| – | 30 March | Engen Grand Prix Final | Cape Town | South Africa | IAAF Permit Meeting |
| – | 28 April | Meeting du Conseil Général de Martinique | Fort-de-France | Martinique | IAAF Permit Meeting |
| 3 | 6 May | Grand Prix Brasil de Atletismo | Rio de Janeiro | Brazil | IAAF Grand Prix I |
| 4 | 12 May | Japan Grand Prix | Osaka | Japan | IAAF Grand Prix I |
| 5 | 18 May | Qatar Athletic Grand Prix 1 | Doha | Qatar | IAAF Grand Prix I |
| 6 | 27 May | Prefontaine Classic | Eugene | United States | IAAF Grand Prix I |
| 7 | 3 June | Adidas Oregon Track Classic | Portland | United States | IAAF Grand Prix II |
| 8 | 4 June | Fanny Blankers-Koen Games | Hengelo | Netherlands | IAAF Grand Prix II |
| – | 6 June | Notturna di Milano | Milan | Italy | IAAF Permit Meeting |
| 9 | 8 June | Atletismo Sevilla | Seville | Spain | IAAF Grand Prix II |
| 10 | 9 June | IAAF Grand Prix Palo Alto | Palo Alto | United States | IAAF Grand Prix I |
| – | 9 June | Znamensky Memorial | Moscow | Russia | IAAF Permit Meeting |
| – | 9 June | Meeting di Atletica Leggera Torino | Turin | Italy | IAAF Permit Meeting |
| 11 | 11 June | Athens Grand Prix | Athens | Greece | IAAF Grand Prix I |
| 12 | 12 June | Cena Slovenska - Slovak Gold | Bratislava | Slovakia | IAAF Grand Prix II |
| 13 | 14 June | Asics Grand Prix Helsinki | Helsinki | Finland | IAAF Grand Prix II |
| – | 17 June | Meeting du Nord | Lille | France | IAAF Permit Meeting |
| – | 17 June | Live Leichtathletikfest Nuremberg | Nuremberg | Germany | IAAF Permit Meeting |
| 14 | 29 June | Golden Gala | Rome | Italy | 2001 IAAF Golden League |
| – | 1 July | IAAF Permit Meeting Budapest | Budapest | Hungary | IAAF Permit Meeting |
| 15 | 2 July | IAAF Meeting Zagreb | Zagreb | Croatia | IAAF Grand Prix II |
| 16 | 4 July | Athletissima | Lausanne | Switzerland | IAAF Grand Prix I |
| 17 | 6 July | Meeting de Paris | Paris | France | 2001 IAAF Golden League |
| 18 | 9 July | Nikaia | Nice | France | IAAF Grand Prix I |
| 19 | 13 July | Bislett Games | Oslo | Norway | 2001 IAAF Golden League |
| 20 | 17 July | DN Galan | Stockholm | Sweden | IAAF Grand Prix I |
| 21 | 20 July | Herculis | Monte Carlo | Monaco | 2001 IAAF Golden League |
| 22 | 22 July | Norwich Union British Grand Prix | London | United Kingdom | IAAF Grand Prix I |
| 23 | 17 August | Weltklasse Zürich | Zürich | Switzerland | 2001 IAAF Golden League |
| 24 | 19 August | Norwich Union Classic - Grand Prix II | Gateshead | United Kingdom | IAAF Grand Prix II |
| 25 | 20 August | Gugl-Meeting | Linz | Austria | IAAF Grand Prix II |
| – | 22 August | International Olympic Meeting | Thessaloniki | Greece | IAAF Permit Meeting |
| 26 | 24 August | Memorial Van Damme | Brussels | Belgium | 2001 IAAF Golden League |
| 27 | 31 August | ISTAF Berlin | Berlin | Germany | 2001 IAAF Golden League |
| 28 | 2 September | Rieti Meeting | Rieti | Italy | IAAF Grand Prix II |
| F | 9 September | 2001 IAAF Grand Prix Final | Melbourne | Australia | IAAF Grand Prix Final |
| – | 15 September | Super Track & Field Meet | Yokohama | Japan | IAAF Permit Meeting |

== Points standings ==
=== Overall men ===
| Rank | Athlete | Nation | Meets | Points |
|---|---|---|---|---|
| 1 | André Bucher | Switzerland | 8 | 102 |
| 2 | Allen Johnson | United States | 9 | 101 |
| 3 | Hicham El Guerrouj | Morocco | 8 | 100 |
| 4 | Paul Bitok | Kenya | 9 | 100 |
| 5 | Anier García | Cuba | 9 | 95 |
| 6 | Bernard Lagat | Kenya | 9 | 94 |
| 7 | Boris Henry | Germany | 9 | 84 |
| 8 | Kevin Dilworth | United States | 9 | 84 |
| 9 | Yuriy Borzakovskiy | Russia | 7 | 77 |
| 10 | Jean-Patrick Nduwimana | Burundi | 9 | 77 |
| 11 | Kipkurui Misoi | Kenya | 9 | 76 |
| 12 | Ēriks Rags | Latvia | 9 | 76 |
| 13 | Luke Kipkosgei | Kenya | 8 | 76 |
| 14 | Virgilijus Alekna | Lithuania | 7 | 75 |
| 15 | Jan Železný | Czech Republic | 6 | 74 |
| 16 | Brahim Boulami | Morocco | 6 | 74 |
| 17 | William Yiampoy | Kenya | 9 | 73 |
| 18 | Benjamin Limo | Kenya | 9 | 72 |
| 19 | Terrence Trammell | United States | 9 | 71 |
| 20 | Reuben Kosgei | Kenya | 6 | 70 |
| 21 | William Chirchir | Kenya | 8 | 70 |
| 22 | Savanté Stringfellow | United States | 7 | 70 |
| 23 | Dominique Arnold | United States | 9 | 69 |
| 24 | Raymond Hecht | Germany | 9 | 69 |
| 25 | Dudley Dorival | Haiti | 9 | 68 |
| 26 | Steve Backley | United Kingdom | 8 | 67 |
| 27 | Hussein Al-Sabee | Saudi Arabia | 9 | 67 |
| 28 | Oleksy Lukashevych | Ukraine | 7 | 64 |
| 29 | Dariusz Trafas | Poland | 9 | 64 |
| 30 | Breaux Greer | United States | 9 | 61 |
| 31 | Colin Jackson | United Kingdom | 9 | 60.5 |
| 32 | Larry Wade | United States | 9 | 60 |
| 33 | Noah Ngeny | Kenya | 7 | 59 |
| 34 | Younès Moudrik | Morocco | 7 | 59 |
| 35 | Jason Tunks | Canada | 8 | 59 |
| 36 | Shawn Crawford | United States | 6 | 58 |
| 37 | Kenenisa Bekele | Ethiopia | 7 | 57 |
| 38 | Iván Pedroso | Cuba | 6 | 57 |
| 39 | Wilfred Bungei | Kenya | 9 | 57 |
| 40 | Bernard Williams | United States | 5 | 56 |
| 41 | Dawane Wallace | United States | 9 | 56 |
| 42 | Frantz Kruger | South Africa | 7 | 56 |
| 43 | Peter Blank | Germany | 9 | 56 |
| 44 | Laban Rotich | Kenya | 7 | 55 |
| 45 | Kareem Streete-Thompson | Cayman Islands | 9 | 55 |
| 46 | Wilson Boit Kipketer | Kenya | 6 | 55 |
| 47 | James Beckford | Jamaica | 6 | 53 |
| 48 | Sammy Kipketer | Kenya | 7 | 51 |
| 49 | Hailu Mekonnen | Ethiopia | 7 | 51 |
| 50 | Stephen Cherono | Kenya | 6 | 50 |
| 51 | Christian Malcolm | United Kingdom | 6 | 50 |
| 52 | Christopher Williams | Jamaica | 8 | 50 |
| 53 | Adam Setliff | United States | 7 | 50 |
| 54 | Aleksander Tammert | Estonia | 8 | 49 |
| 55 | Hezekiél Sepeng | South Africa | 8 | 47 |
| 56 | John Kosgei | Kenya | 7 | 46 |
| 57 | Richard Limo | Kenya | 6 | 46 |
| 58 | Glody Dube | Botswana | 6 | 45 |
| 59 | Abiyote Abate | Ethiopia | 8 | 45 |
| 60 | John Kibowen | Kenya | 7 | 45 |
| 61 | Joseph Mutua | Kenya | 6 | 44 |
| 62 | Francis Obikwelu | Nigeria | 6 | 43 |
| 63 | Driss Maazouzi | France | 7 | 42 |
| 64 | Vasiliy Kaptyukh | Belarus | 7 | 42 |
| 65 | Julius Nyamu | Kenya | 6 | 41 |
| 66 | Róbert Fazekas | Hungary | 6 | 41 |
| 67 | Luis Miguel Martín | Spain | 5 | 40 |
| 68 | Kevin Little | United States | 8 | 40 |
| 69 | Aziz Zakari | Ghana | 7 | 39 |
| 70 | Raymond Yator | Kenya | 5 | 39 |
| 71 | Vyacheslav Shabunin | Russia | 8 | 39 |
| 72 | Konstadinos Gatsioudis | Greece | 4 | 39 |
| 73 | Vitaliy Shkurlatov | Russia | 8 | 37 |
| 74 | Enock Koech | Kenya | 6 | 36 |
| 75 | Ali Saïdi-Sief | Algeria | 4 | 36 |
| 75 | Aki Parviainen | Finland | 5 | 36 |
| 75 | Shaun Bownes | South Africa | 7 | 36 |
| 78 | Sergey Makarov | Russia | 5 | 33 |
| 78 | Mbulaeni Mulaudzi | South Africa | 5 | 33 |
| 80 | Kevin Sullivan | Canada | 5 | 32 |
| 81 | Benjamin Kipkurui | Kenya | 5 | 32 |
| 82 | Bernard Barmasai | Kenya | 4 | 32 |
| 82 | Mark Crear | United States | 5 | 32 |
| 84 | Dmitry Shevchenko | Russia | 5 | 31 |
| 85 | Staņislavs Olijars | Latvia | 4 | 30 |
| 86 | Ali Ezzine | Morocco | 5 | 29 |
| 86 | Michael Möllenbeck | Germany | 5 | 29 |
| 88 | Dwight Phillips | United States | 4 | 28 |
| 89 | Abderrahim Goumri | Morocco | 6 | 27 |
| 90 | Daniel Komen | Kenya | 6 | 27 |
| 91 | André Domingos | Brazil | 5 | 26 |
| 92 | Tom Nyariki | Kenya | 4 | 26 |
| 93 | Mark Bett | Kenya | 3 | 25 |
| 94 | Harri Haatainen | Finland | 4 | 23 |
| 94 | Antonio David Jiménez | Spain | 4 | 23 |
| 94 | Gregor Högler | Austria | 5 | 23 |
| 94 | Terry Reese | United States | 5 | 23 |
| 99 | Stéphan Buckland | Mauritius | 4 | 22 |
| 99 | Zoltán Kővágó | Hungary | 4 | 22 |

=== Overall women ===
| Rank | Athlete | Nation | Meets | Points |
|---|---|---|---|---|
| 1 | Violeta Szekely | Romania | 8 | 116 |
| 2 | Maria Mutola | Mozambique | 8 | 105 |
| 3 | Tetyana Tereshchuk | Ukraine | 8 | 96 |
| 4 | Hestrie Cloete | South Africa | 8 | 93.5 |
| 5 | Kajsa Bergqvist | Sweden | 8 | 92.5 |
| 6 | Stephanie Graf | Austria | 7 | 92 |
| 7 | Natalya Gorelova | Russia | 8 | 88 |
| 8 | Stacy Dragila | United States | 8 | 86 |
| 8 | Debbie Parris-Thymes | Jamaica | 8 | 86 |
| 10 | Inha Babakova | Ukraine | 8 | 85.5 |
| 11 | Tonja Buford-Bailey | United States | 8 | 85 |
| 12 | Amy Acuff | United States | 8 | 81.5 |
| 13 | Olga Yegorova | Russia | 5 | 78 |
| 14 | Sandra Glover | United States | 8 | 70 |
| 15 | Natalya Tsyganova | Russia | 8 | 69.5 |
| 16 | Kelly Holmes | United Kingdom | 6 | 68 |
| 17 | Vita Palamar | Ukraine | 6 | 67.5 |
| 18 | Svetlana Feofanova | Russia | 6 | 67 |
| 18 | Carla Sacramento | Portugal | 5 | 67 |
| 20 | Nezha Bidouane | Morocco | 5 | 66 |
| 20 | Tatyana Lebedeva | Russia | 7 | 66 |
| 22 | Venelina Veneva | Bulgaria | 8 | 64 |
| 22 | Ionela Târlea | Romania | 8 | 64 |
| 24 | Tatyana Tomashova | Russia | 4 | 60 |
| 25 | Kamila Skolimowska | Poland | 4 | 56 |
| 25 | Olga Kuzenkova | Russia | 5 | 56 |
| 25 | Debbie Ferguson-McKenzie | Bahamas | 4 | 56 |
| 28 | Jolanda Čeplak | Slovenia | 8 | 55 |
| 29 | Kellie Suttle | United States | 8 | 54.5 |
| 30 | Faith Macharia | Kenya | 8 | 54 |
| 30 | Zulia Calatayud | Cuba | 6 | 54 |
| 32 | Daimí Pernía | Cuba | 7 | 53 |
| 32 | Berhane Adere | Ethiopia | 6 | 53 |
| 34 | Letitia Vriesde | Suriname | 8 | 52 |
| 34 | Myriam Léonie Mani | Cameroon | 4 | 52 |
| 36 | Tereza Marinova | Bulgaria | 4 | 51 |
| 36 | Edith Masai | Kenya | 5 | 51 |
| 38 | Bronwyn Eagles | Australia | 4 | 50 |
| 38 | Yuliya Pechonkina | Russia | 6 | 50 |
| 38 | Lidia Chojecka | Poland | 5 | 50 |
| 41 | Juliet Campbell | Jamaica | 4 | 49 |
| 42 | Kelli White | United States | 4 | 48 |
| 43 | Melissa Mueller | United States | 8 | 47.5 |
| 44 | Nadzeya Ostapchuk | Belarus | 4 | 47 |
| 44 | Leah Malot | Kenya | 4 | 47 |
| 44 | Magdelín Martínez | Italy | 5 | 47 |
| 44 | Dawn Ellerbe | United States | 5 | 47 |
| 48 | Astrid Kumbernuss | Germany | 4 | 46 |
| 48 | Beverly McDonald | Jamaica | 4 | 46 |
| 50 | Suzy Favor | United States | 5 | 45 |
| 50 | Monika Pyrek | Poland | 5 | 45 |
| 52 | Gete Wami | Ethiopia | 5 | 44 |
| 53 | Gabriela Szabo | Romania | 5 | 43 |
| 54 | Monica Iagăr | Romania | 6 | 40.5 |
| 55 | Volha Tsander | Belarus | 5 | 40 |
| 56 | Françoise Mbango Etone | Cameroon | 5 | 39 |
| 57 | Dóra Győrffy | Hungary | 8 | 38,7 |
| 58 | Irina Mistyukevich | Russia | 7 | 38 |
| 59 | Lieja Tunks | Canada | 4 | 37 |
| 59 | Paula Radcliffe | United Kingdom | 5 | 37 |
| 59 | Svetlana Krivelyova | Russia | 4 | 37 |
| 59 | Lyudmila Vasilyeva | Russia | 5 | 37 |
| 63 | Mercy Nku | Nigeria | 4 | 36 |
| 64 | Yelena Isinbayeva | Russia | 4 | 35 |
| 65 | Olga Raspopova | Russia | 7 | 33.5 |
| 66 | Yelena Oleynikova | Russia | 5 | 33 |
| 66 | Connie Price-Smith | United States | 4 | 33 |
| 68 | Yuliya Kosenkova | Russia | 5 | 32 |
| 68 | Sarah Schwald | United States | 6 | 32 |
| 68 | Yanina Karolchyk | Belarus | 4 | 32 |
| 71 | Tatiana Grigorieva | Australia | 5 | 31.5 |
| 72 | Regina Jacobs | United States | 5 | 30 |
| 73 | Natalya Torshina | Kazakhstan | 5 | 29 |
| 73 | Olena Hovorova | Ukraine | 4 | 29 |
| 73 | Asmae Leghzaoui | Morocco | 5 | 29 |
| 76 | Mary Sauer | United States | 6 | 28.5 |
| 77 | Alesia Turava | Belarus | 4 | 28 |
| 77 | Mardrea Hyman | Jamaica | 6 | 28 |
| 77 | Lyudmila Gubkina | Belarus | 4 | 28 |
| 80 | Ivonne Teichmann | Germany | 4 | 27 |
| 81 | Surita Febbraio | South Africa | 6 | 25 |
| 82 | Alenka Bikar | Slovenia | 5 | 24.5 |
| 83 | Cristina Nicolau | Romania | 4 | 24 |
| 83 | Doris Auer | Austria | 6 | 24 |
| 85 | Olga Kaliturina | Russia | 5 | 23.5 |
| 86 | Tatyana Konstantinova | Russia | 7 | 23 |
| 86 | Diane Cummins | Canada | 4 | 23 |
| 88 | Pavla Hamáčková | Czech Republic | 6 | 22 |
| 88 | Anzhela Balakhonova | Ukraine | 4 | 22 |
| 88 | Karyne Di Marco | Australia | 4 | 22 |
| 88 | Heli Koivula | Finland | 5 | 22 |
| 92 | Rose Cheruiyot | Kenya | 3 | 21 |
| 92 | Manuela Montebrun | France | 3 | 21 |
| 94 | Yelena Zadorozhnaya | Russia | 2 | 20 |
| 94 | Marla Runyan | United States | 3 | 20 |
| 94 | Ebru Kavaklıoğlu | Turkey | 3 | 20 |
| 97 | Valentina Fedyushina | Austria | 5 | 19 |
| 97 | LaTasha Jenkins | United States | 3 | 19 |
| 97 | Daniela Yordanova | Bulgaria | 3 | 19 |
| 97 | Blanka Vlašić | Croatia | 3 | 19 |
