= Golden Four =

European athletics meetings

The Golden Four was an annual series of outdoor track and field meetings in Europe, which lasted from 1993 to 1997. The four meetings that comprised the series were the Bislett Games (Oslo), Weltklasse Zürich (Zürich), Memorial Van Damme (Brussels), and Internationales Stadionfest (Berlin). The name of the series derived from the number of meets and the series prize of 20 kg of gold, to be shared among the athletes who won their event at all four of the meets. The Berlin leg served as the series final. Marketing for the series was managed by UFA GmbH.

The series was a precursor to the IAAF Golden League, which was created in 1998 as an extension of the previous series, adding the Golden Gala (Rome), Herculis (Monaco), and 1998 IAAF Grand Prix Final (Moscow) to the existing four meetings. The Golden League was later superseded by the IAAF Diamond League, the premier seasonal competition for track and field.

The series itself had a precursor in the IAAF Golden Events, which was an effort in the late 1970s and 1980s to encourage the top professional athletes to compete against each other in non-championship settings. Zürich, Oslo and Brussels each hosted a Golden Event in 1978.

== Jackpot winners ==
Year	Winners	Prize
1993 (details)	Maria Mutola (800 m); Sonia O'Sullivan (5000 m); Trine Hattestad (javelin throw); Michael Johnson (400 m); Noureddine Morceli (1500 m)	20 kg gold bars
1994 (details)	Colin Jackson (110 m hurdles); Mike Powell (long jump)	20 kg gold bars
1995 (details)	Gwen Torrence (200 m); Sonia O'Sullivan (5000 m); Natalya Shikolenko (javelin throw); Michael Johnson (400 m)	20 kg gold bars
1996 (details)	Stefka Kostadinova (high jump); Frankie Fredericks (200 m); Wilson Kipketer (800 m); Jonathan Edwards (triple jump); Lars Riedel (discus throw)	20 kg gold bars
1997 (details)	Gabriela Szabo (3000 m/5000 m); Frankie Fredericks (100 m); Hicham El Guerrouj (1500 m/mile)	20 kg gold bars
