= London Athletics Meet =

Athletics tournament held in London, United Kingdom

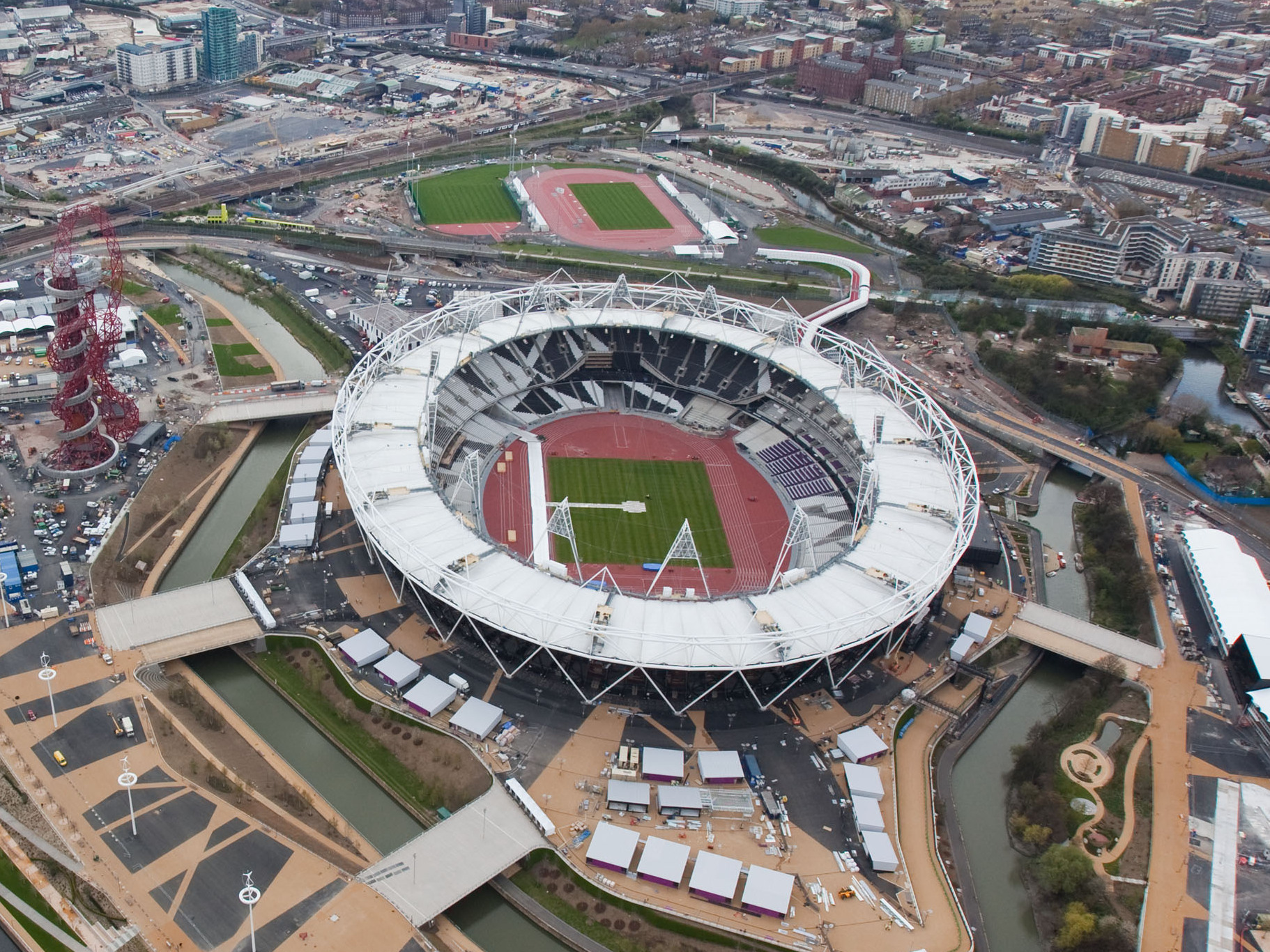
- London Stadium, current host of the annual event
- Date: July – August
- Location: London, England (Glasgow, Scotland in 2014/Gateshead, England in 2021/Birmingham, England in 2022)
- Event type: Track and field
- World Athletics Cat.: GW
- Established: 1953; 73 years ago
- Website: London Anniversary Games
- 2026 London Athletics Meet

The London Athletics Meet, formerly known as the London Grand Prix and subsequently as the Anniversary Games and London Diamond League, is an annual athletics event held in London, England. Previously one of the five IAAF Super Grand Prix events, it is now part of the Diamond League. From 1997 through 2005 the meetings were known as the British Grand Prix, before that name reverted to the meetings usually held in Gateshead and Birmingham.

As the London Grand Prix, until 2012 most editions were held at the National Sports Centre in Crystal Palace. The 2013 edition was renamed the Anniversary Games as it took place at the Stadium in Queen Elizabeth Olympic Park, exactly one year after the Olympic Games were held in the same venue. It was followed by an IPC London Grand Prix, making it a three-day event. In 2014 the meet was held in Glasgow, Scotland, as preparation for the Commonwealth Games held there later that month.

== Editions ==
The event has been sponsored by a variety of companies including Peugeot, Norwich Union, Sainsbury's and Müller.

London Athletics Meet editions
Ed.	Meeting	Series	Date	Sponsor	Ref.
1–25	International Games		1953–1977		
26th	1978 British Games (Note: Also known as Royal Watches International Games)		23 Aug 1978	Rotary Watches	
27th	1979 British Games		31 Aug 1979	Rotary Watches	
28th	1980 British Games (Note: Also known as Talbot (International) Games)		27 Jun 1980	Talbot	
29th	1981 British Games		31 Jul 1981	Talbot	
30th	1982 British Games		20 Aug 1982	Talbot	
31st	1983 British Games		15 Jul 1983	Talbot	
32nd	1984 British Games (Note: Also known as Peugeot Talbot Games and Talbot Games)		13 Jul 1984	Peugeot / Talbot	
33rd	1985 London Grand Prix (Note: Also known as Peugeot Talbot Games)	1985 IAAF Grand Prix	19 Jul 1985	Peugeot / Talbot	
34th	1986 London Grand Prix	1986 IAAF Grand Prix	11 Jul 1986	Peugeot / Talbot	
35th	1987 London Grand Prix	1987 IAAF Grand Prix	10 Jul 1987	Peugeot / Talbot	
36th	1988 London Grand Prix (Note: Also known as Peugeot Games and Peugeot Talbot Games)	1988 IAAF Grand Prix	8 Jul 1988	Peugeot / Talbot	
37th	1989 London Grand Prix (Note: Also known as Royal Mail Parcels Games and Peugeot Games)	1989 IAAF Grand Prix	14 Jul 1989	Royal Mail / Peugeot	
38th	1990 London Grand Prix (Note: Also known as Royal Mail Parcels Games and Parcelforce Games)	1990 IAAF Grand Prix	20 Jul 1990	Parcelforce	
39th	1991 London Grand Prix (Note: Also known as Parcelforce Games)	1991 IAAF Grand Prix	12 Jul 1991	Parcelforce	
40th	1992 London Grand Prix (Note: Also known as TSB Grand Prix)	1992 IAAF Grand Prix	10 Jul 1992	TSB	
41st	1993 London Grand Prix (Note: Also known as TSB Games)	1993 IAAF Grand Prix	23 Jul 1993	TSB	
42nd	1994 London Grand Prix	1994 IAAF Grand Prix I	15 Jul 1994	TSB	
43rd	1995 London Grand Prix (Note: Also known as TSB Games and KP Games)	1995 IAAF Grand Prix I	7 Jul 1995	KP Nuts	
44th	1996 London Grand Prix (Note: Also known as British Grand Prix and Securicor Games)	1996 IAAF Grand Prix I	12 Jul 1996	Securicor	
45th	1997 Sheffield Grand Prix	1997 IAAF Grand Prix I	29 Jun 1997	Securicor	
46th	1998 Sheffield Grand Prix (Note: Officially known as British Grand Prix)	1998 IAAF Grand Prix I	2 Aug 1998	none	
47th	1999 London Grand Prix	1999 IAAF Grand Prix I	7 Aug 1999	CGU	
48th	2000 London Grand Prix (Note: Officially known as Norwich Union British Grand Prix)	2000 IAAF Grand Prix I	5 Aug 2000	Norwich Union	
49th	2001 London Grand Prix	2001 IAAF Grand Prix I	22 Jul 2001	Norwich Union	
50th	2002 London Grand Prix	2002 IAAF Grand Prix I	23 Aug 2002	Norwich Union	
51st	2003 London Grand Prix	2003 IAAF Super Grand Prix	8 Aug 2003	Norwich Union	
52nd	2004 London Grand Prix	2004 IAAF Super Grand Prix	30 Jul 2004	Norwich Union	
53rd	2005 London Grand Prix	2005 IAAF Super Grand Prix	22 Jul 2005	Norwich Union	
54th	2006 London Grand Prix	2006 IAAF Super Grand Prix	28 Jul 2006	Norwich Union	
55th	2007 London Grand Prix (Note: Officially known as Norwich Union Super Grand Prix)	2007 IAAF Super Grand Prix	3 Aug 2007	Norwich Union	
56th	2008 London Grand Prix	2008 IAAF Super Grand Prix	25–26 Jul 2008	Aviva	
57th	2009 London Grand Prix	2009 IAAF Super Grand Prix	24–25 Jul 2009	Aviva	
58th	2010 London Grand Prix	2010 Diamond League	13–14 Aug 2010	Aviva	
59th	2011 London Grand Prix	2011 Diamond League	5–6 Aug 2011	Aviva	
60th	2012 London Grand Prix	2012 Diamond League	13–14 Jul 2012	Aviva	
61st	2013 Anniversary Games	2013 Diamond League	26–27 Jul 2013	Sainsbury's	
62nd	2014 Glasgow Grand Prix	2014 Diamond League	11–12 Jul 2014	Sainsbury's	
63rd	2015 Anniversary Games	2015 Diamond League	24–25 Jul 2015	Sainsbury's	
64th	2016 Anniversary Games	2016 Diamond League	22–23 Jul 2016	Müller	
65th	2017 Anniversary Games	2017 Diamond League	9 Jul 2017	Müller	
66th	2018 Anniversary Games	2018 Diamond League	21–22 Jul 2018	Müller	
67th	2019 Anniversary Games	2019 Diamond League	20–21 Jul 2019	Müller	
2020: Meet canceled due to COVID-19
68th	2021 Anniversary Games (Note: Officially known as Müller British Grand Prix)	2021 Diamond League	13 Jul 2021	Müller	
69th	2022 Birmingham Diamond League (Note: Officially known as Müller Birmingham Diamond League)	2022 Diamond League	21 May 2022	Müller	
70th	2023 London Athletics Meet (Note: Also known as London Diamond League)	2023 Diamond League	23 Jul 2023		
71st	2024 London Athletics Meet	2024 Diamond League	20 Jul 2024		
72nd	2025 London Athletics Meet	2025 Diamond League	19 Jul 2025	Novuna	
73rd	2026 London Athletics Meet	2026 Diamond League	18 Jul 2026	Novuna	

== Venues ==
Venues for the London Athletics Meet
Years	Venue	Region	Country
1953–1963	?	?	England
1964–1996, 1999–2012	National Sports Centre	Crystal Palace, London	England
1997–1998	Don Valley Stadium	Sheffield	England
2013, 2015–2019, 2023–2026	London Stadium	Stratford, London	England
2014	Hampden Park	Mount Florida, Glasgow	Scotland
2021	Gateshead International Stadium	Gateshead	England
2022	Alexander Stadium	Birmingham	England

== Emsley Carr Mile ==
The Emsley Carr Mile remains a fixture at the annual meeting, with a history spanning back to 1953 at the White City Stadium. Emsley Carr, an athletics fan and the editor of The News of the World, created an annual mile race in the hope that the first four-minute mile would be achieved on British soil. Gordon Pirie won the first race, but Roger Bannister had run under 4 minutes in Oxford by time that the second race was competed. However, the tradition continued, with the winner signing his name in a red leather-bound book identical to the Bible used in Queen Elizabeth II's coronation. Derek Ibbotson achieved the first sub-4-minute run at the race in 1956, and many of the best middle-distance runners have won at the Emsley Carr Mile since, including Sebastian Coe, Steve Ovett and Hicham El Guerrouj.

== Millicent Fawcett Mile ==
The Millicent Fawcett Mile, a women's race, was first held in the 2018 Anniversary Games and won by Sifan Hassan in 4:14.71. It commemorates suffragist Millicent Fawcett. There had been a women's mile event at previous games, without this title, the previous record being held by Hellen Obiri who ran in 2017 in 4:16.56.

== History ==
In 2009 pole vault favourite Yelena Isinbayeva lost for the first time in 18 competitions, beaten by Anna Rogowska. Kate Dennison set an eighth British record in the pole vault.

On 24 January 2013 it was announced that London Grand Prix would be moved to the Olympic Stadium for 2013. The London Legacy Development Corporation had expressed interest in holding an athletics event at the stadium to coincide with the first anniversary of the start of the 2012 Summer Olympics. After the 2013 event, a return to Crystal Palace was ruled out as according to Ed Warner it would be a backward step.

Hampden Park, which was due to host the athletics events at the Commonwealth Games and a temporary venue in Horse Guards Parade and the Mall, were mooted for the 2014 edition, before a return to the Olympic Stadium in 2015 due to a gap in the reconstruction schedule. A four-year sponsorship deal with Sainsbury's was announced in January 2014. In February 2014 it was confirmed that the Grand Prix event would move to Hampden Park and be known as the Glasgow Grand Prix. The event returned to London in 2015 and continued to be known as the Anniversary Games until 2021.

The 2021 event, due to be held on 13 July, was moved away from London Stadium to Gateshead International Stadium due to the difficulty of reconfiguring the stadium for a single athletics event.

== World records ==
Over the course of its history, a number of world records have been set at the London Grand Prix.

World records set at the London Athletics Meet
Year	Event	Record	Athlete	Nationality
1986	2000 m	5:28.69	Maricica Puică	Romania
2004	Pole vault	4.90 m	Yelena Isinbaeva	Russia
2005	Pole vault	4.96 m	Yelena Isinbaeva	Russia
2005	Pole vault	5.00 m	Yelena Isinbaeva	Russia
2016	100 m hurdles	12.20 (+0.3 m/s)	Kendra Harrison	United States
2018	T38 200 m	25.93	Sophie Hahn	Great Britain
2018	T34 100 m	16.80	Kare Adenegan	Great Britain
2018	3000 m walk (track)	10:43.84	Tom Bosworth	Great Britain
2023	U20 5000 m	14:16.54 (Note: Not ratified as no anti-doping test was taken after the race.)	Medina Eisa	Ethiopia
2026	Mile	3:42.66	Josh Kerr	Great Britain

== Meeting records ==
=== Men ===
Men's meeting records of the London Athletics Meet
Event	Record	Athlete	Nationality	Date	Place	Ref.	Video
100 m	9.78 (−0.4 m/s)	Tyson Gay	United States	13 August 2010	Crystal Palace		
200 m	19.47 (+1.6 m/s)	Noah Lyles	United States	23 July 2023	Stratford		
400 m	43.74	Matthew Hudson-Smith	Great Britain	20 July 2024	Stratford		
800 m	1:42.00	Emmanuel Wanyonyi	Kenya	19 July 2025	Stratford		
1000 m	2:14.15	Abdi Bile	Somalia	14 July 1989	Crystal Palace		
1500 m	3:27.62+	Josh Kerr	Great Britain	18 July 2026	Stratford		
Mile	3:42.66 WR	Josh Kerr	Great Britain	18 July 2026	Stratford		
3000 m	7:27.64	Mohamed Katir	Spain	13 July 2021	Gateshead		
Two miles	8:01.72	Haile Gebrselassie	Ethiopia	7 August 1999	Crystal Palace		
5000 m	12:55.51	Haile Gebrselassie	Ethiopia	30 July 2004	Crystal Palace		
10,000 m	27:20.38	Aloÿs Nizigama	Burundi	7 July 1995	Crystal Palace		
110 m hurdles	12.89 (+0.3 m/s)	Ja'Kobe Tharp	United States	18 July 2026	Stratford		
400 m hurdles	46.61	Karsten Warholm	Norway	18 July 2026	Stratford		
3000 m steeplechase	8:06.86	Brimin Kiprop Kipruto	Kenya	27 July 2013	Stratford		
High jump	2.41 m	Javier Sotomayor	Cuba	15 July 1994	Crystal Palace		
Pole vault	6.03 m	Renaud Lavillenie	France	25 July 2015	Stratford		
Long jump	8.58 m (+0.2 m/s)	Luvo Manyonga	South Africa	22 July 2018	Stratford		
Triple jump	17.78 m (+0.6 m/s)	Christian Taylor	United States	22 July 2016	Stratford		
Shot put	23.07 m	Ryan Crouser	United States	23 July 2023	Stratford		
Discus throw	71.70 m	Mykolas Alekna	Lithuania	19 July 2025	Stratford		
Hammer throw	85.60 m	Yuriy Sedykh	Soviet Union	13 July 1984	Crystal Palace		
Javelin throw	90.81 m	Steve Backley	Great Britain	22 July 2001	Crystal Palace		
Mile walk (track)	5:31.08	Tom Bosworth	Great Britain	9 July 2017	Stratford		
3000 m walk (track)	10:43.84	Tom Bosworth	Great Britain	21 July 2018	Stratford		
4 × 100 m relay	37.60	Chijindu Ujah; Zharnel Hughes; Richard Kilty; Nethaneel Mitchell-Blake	Great Britain	21 July 2019	Stratford		
4 × 100 m relay	37.46	Racers Track Club; Daniel Bailey; Yohan Blake; Mario Forsythe; Usain Bolt	Antigua and Barbuda / Jamaica	25 July 2009	Crystal Palace		

=== Women ===
Women's meeting records of the London Athletics Meet
Event	Record	Athlete	Nationality	Date	Place	Ref.
100 m	10.75 (+1.2 m/s)	Marie-Josée Ta Lou	Ivory Coast	23 July 2023	Stratford	
200 m	21.66 (+0.1 m/s)	Julien Alfred	Saint Lucia	18 July 2026	Stratford	
400 m	48.57	Nickisha Pryce	Jamaica	20 July 2024	Stratford	
800 m	1:54.61	Keely Hodgkinson	Great Britain	20 July 2024	Stratford	
1000 m	2:34.73	Paula Ivan	Romania	14 July 1989	Crystal Palace	
1500 m	3:54.75+	Gudaf Tsegay	Ethiopia	19 July 2025	Stratford	
Mile	4:11.88	Gudaf Tsegay	Ethiopia	19 July 2025	Stratford	
2000 m	5:28.69	Maricica Puică	Romania	11 July 1986	Crystal Palace	
3000 m	8:21.64	Sonia O'Sullivan	Ireland	15 July 1994	Crystal Palace	
5000 m	14:12.29	Gudaf Tsegay	Ethiopia	23 July 2023	Stratford	
100 m hurdles	12.20 (+0.3 m/s)	Kendra Harrison	United States	22 July 2016	Stratford	
400 m hurdles	51.30 DLR	Femke Bol	Netherlands	20 July 2024	Stratford	
3000 m steeplechase	8:57.35	Jackline Chepkoech	Kenya	23 July 2023	Stratford	
High jump	2.05 m	Kajsa Bergqvist	Sweden	28 July 2006	Crystal Palace	
Pole vault	5.00 m	Yelena Isinbayeva	Russia	22 July 2005	Crystal Palace	
Long jump	7.09 m (±0.0 m/s)	Malaika Mihambo	Germany	21 May 2022	Birmingham	
Triple jump	15.27 m (+1.2 m/s)	Yamilé Aldama	Sudan	8 August 2003	Crystal Palace	
Shot put	20.90 m	Valerie Adams	New Zealand	27 July 2013	Stratford	
Discus throw	71.72 m DLR	Cierra Jackson	United States	18 July 2026	Stratford	
Javelin throw	72.98 m (old design)	Fatima Whitbread	United Kingdom	10 July 1987	Crystal Palace	
Javelin throw	68.26 m (current design)	Barbora Špotáková	Czech Republic	9 July 2017	Stratford	
4 × 100 m relay	41.55 DLR	Dina Asher-Smith; Imani Lansiquot; Amy Hunt; Daryll Neita	Great Britain	20 July 2024	Stratford	
