= Athletissima =

Athletics tournament held in Lausanne, Switzerland

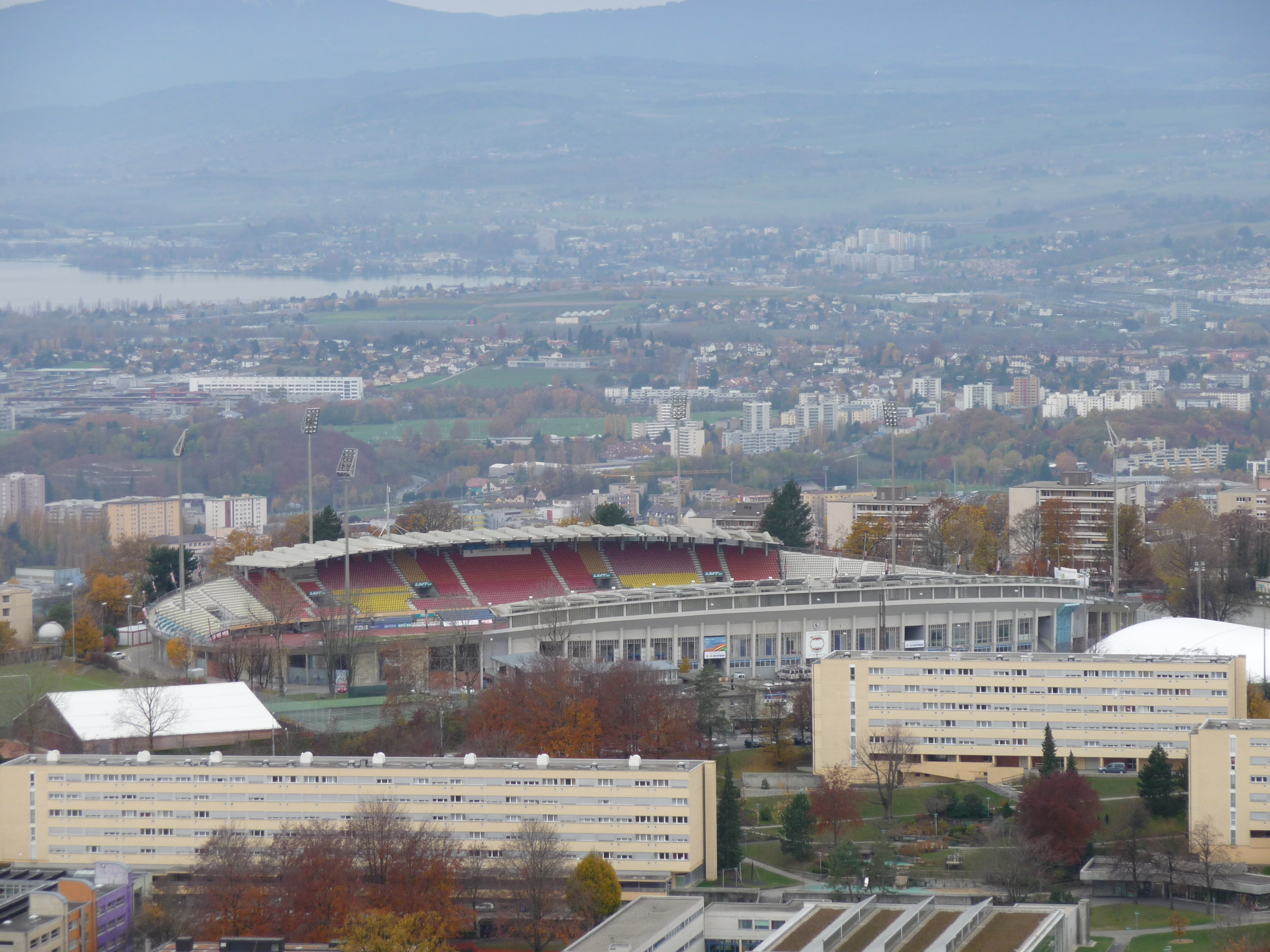
- Stade Olympique de la Pontaise
- Date: June – September
- Location: Lausanne, Switzerland
- Event type: Track and field
- World Athletics Cat.: GW
- Established: 8 July 1977; 49 years ago
- Website: Diamond League – Lausanne
- 2026 Athletissima

Logo

Athletissima is an annual athletics meeting in Lausanne, Switzerland. Previously one of the five IAAF Super Grand Prix events, it is now part of the Diamond League.

The first edition was held on 8 July 1977 in the Stade Pierre de Coubertin. In 1986, the event was moved to the Stade Olympique de la Pontaise.

UBS has been the main sponsor of Athletissima Lausanne since 1982. Other sponsors are Vaudoise Assurances, Omega, Erdgas and Nike.

== History ==
Prior to Athletissima, international athletics meetings were also held in Lausanne on 6 July 1947 and 13 July 1957. The latter was also known as the "American Meeting", similar to precursors of the Weltklasse Zürich.

== Editions ==
Athletissima editions
Ed.	Meeting	Series	Date	Ref.
1st	1977 Athletissima		8 Jul 1977	
2nd	1978 Athletissima		13 Jul 1978	
3rd	1979 Athletissima		18 Jul 1979	
4th	1980 Athletissima		15 Aug 1980	
5th	1981 Athletissima		14 Jul 1981	
6th	1982 Athletissima		14 Jul 1982	
7th	1983 Athletissima		30 Jun 1983	
8th	1984 Athletissima		10 Jul 1984	
9th	1985 Athletissima		10 Jul 1985	
10th	1986 Athletissima		2 Sep 1986	
11th	1987 Athletissima		15 Sep 1987	
12th	1988 Athletissima	1988 IAAF Grand Prix	24 Jun 1988	
13th	1989 Athletissima	1989 IAAF Grand Prix	27 Jun 1989	
14th	1990 Athletissima	1990 IAAF Grand Prix	12 Jul 1990	
15th	1991 Athletissima	1991 IAAF Grand Prix	10 Jul 1991	
16th	1992 Athletissima	1992 IAAF Grand Prix	8 Jul 1992	
17th	1993 Athletissima	1993 IAAF Grand Prix	7 Jul 1993	
18th	1994 Athletissima	1994 IAAF Grand Prix	6 Jul 1994	
19th	1995 Athletissima	1995 IAAF Grand Prix	5 Jul 1995	
20th	1996 Athletissima	1996 IAAF Grand Prix	3 Jul 1996	
21st	1997 Athletissima	1997 IAAF Grand Prix	2 Jul 1997	
22nd	1998 Athletissima	1998 IAAF Grand Prix	25 Aug 1998	
23rd	1999 Athletissima	1999 IAAF Grand Prix	2 Jul 1999	
24th	2000 Athletissima	2000 IAAF Grand Prix	5 Jul 2000	
25th	2001 Athletissima	2001 IAAF Grand Prix	4 Jul 2001	
26th	2002 Athletissima	2002 IAAF Grand Prix	2 Jul 2002	
27th	2003 Athletissima	2003 IAAF Super Grand Prix	1 Jul 2003	
28th	2004 Athletissima	2004 IAAF Super Grand Prix	6 Jul 2004	
29th	2005 Athletissima	2005 IAAF Super Grand Prix	5 Jul 2005	
30th	2006 Athletissima	2006 IAAF Super Grand Prix	11 Jul 2006	
31st	2007 Athletissima	2007 IAAF Super Grand Prix	10 Jul 2007	
32nd	2008 Athletissima	2008 IAAF Super Grand Prix	2 Sep 2008	
33rd	2009 Athletissima	2009 IAAF Super Grand Prix	7 Jul 2009	
34th	2010 Athletissima	2010 Diamond League	8 Jul 2010	
35th	2011 Athletissima	2011 Diamond League	30 Jun 2011	
36th	2012 Athletissima	2012 Diamond League	23 Aug 2012	
37th	2013 Athletissima	2013 Diamond League	4 Jul 2013	
38th	2014 Athletissima	2014 Diamond League	3 Jul 2014	
39th	2015 Athletissima	2015 Diamond League	9 Jul 2015	
40th	2016 Athletissima	2016 Diamond League	25 Aug 2016	
41st	2017 Athletissima	2017 Diamond League	6 Jul 2017	
42nd	2018 Athletissima	2018 Diamond League	4–5 Jul 2018	
43rd	2019 Athletissima	2019 Diamond League	4–5 Jul 2019	
44th	2020 Athletissima	2020 Diamond League	2 Sep 2020	
45th	2021 Athletissima	2021 Diamond League	25–26 Aug 2021	
46th	2022 Athletissima	2022 Diamond League	25–26 Aug 2022	
47th	2023 Athletissima	2023 Diamond League	29–30 Jun 2023	
48th	2024 Athletissima	2024 Diamond League	21–22 Aug 2024	
49th	2025 Athletissima	2025 Diamond League	19–20 Aug 2025	
50th	2026 Athletissima	2026 Diamond League	20–21 Aug 2026	

== World records ==
Over the course of its history, three world records have been set at Athletissima.

World records set at Athletissima
Year	Event	Record	Athlete	Nationality
1994	100 m	9.85 (+1.2 m/s)	Leroy Burrell	United States
2005	Pole vault	4.93 m	Yelena Isinbayeva	Russia
2006	110 m hurdles	12.88 (+1.1 m/s)	Liu Xiang	China

== Meeting records ==
=== Men ===
Men's meeting records of Athletissima
Event	Record	Athlete	Nationality	Date	Meet	Ref.
100 m	9.69 (−0.1 m/s) DLR	Yohan Blake	Jamaica	23 August 2012	2012	
200 m	19.50 (−0.1 m/s)	Noah Lyles	United States	5 July 2019	2019	
400 m	43.62	Wayde van Niekerk	South Africa	6 July 2017	2017	
800 m	1:41.11 DLR	Emmanuel Wanyonyi	Kenya	22 August 2024	2024	
1000 m	2:13.49	Ayanleh Souleiman	Djibouti	25 August 2016	2016	
1500 m	3:27.83	Jakob Ingebrigtsen	Norway	22 August 2024	2024	
Mile	3:49.12	Noureddine Morceli	Algeria	10 July 1991	1991	
2000 m	4:52.44	Jim Spivey	USA	15 September 1987	1987	
3000 m	7:30.62	Daniel Komen	Kenya	2 July 1999	1999	
5000 m	12:40.45	Berihu Aregawi	Ethiopia	30 June 2023	2023	
10,000 m	27:15.00	Haile Gebrselassie	Ethiopia	6 July 1994	1994	
110 m hurdles	12.88 (+1.1 m/s)	Liu Xiang	China	11 July 2006	2006	
400 m hurdles	46.67	Rai Benjamin	United States	21 August 2026	2026	
3000 m steeplechase	8:01.62	Brimin Kiprop Kipruto	Kenya	8 July 2010	2010	
High jump	2.41 m	Bohdan Bondarenko	Ukraine	4 July 2013	2013	
Pole vault	6.21 m	Armand Duplantis	Sweden	20 August 2026	2026	
Long jump	8.56 m (+2.0 m/s)	Iván Pedroso	Cuba	5 July 1995	1995	
Triple jump	18.06 m (+1.1 m/s)	Christian Taylor	United States	9 July 2015	2015	
Shot put	22.81 m	Ryan Crouser	United States	26 August 2021	2021	
Discus throw	70.53 m	Virgilijus Alekna	Lithuania	5 July 2005	2005	
Hammer throw	84.48 m	Igor Nikulin	Soviet Union	12 July 1990	1990	
Javelin throw	90.72 m (old design)	Jan Železný	Czechoslovakia	10 July 1991	1991	
Javelin throw	90.61 m (current design)	Anderson Peters	Grenada	22 August 2024	2024	
4 × 100 m relay	38.75	Michael Frater; Ainsley Waugh; Nesta Carter; Asafa Powell	Jamaica	10 July 2007	2007	
4 × 400 m relay	3:07.26	Reto Jelinek; Mathias Rusterholz; Alain Sierro; Daniel Kehl	Switzerland	8 July 1992	1992	

=== Women ===
Women's meeting records of Athletissima
Event	Record	Athlete	Nationality	Date	Meet	Ref.
100 m	10.60 (+1.7 m/s)	Shelly-Ann Fraser-Pryce	Jamaica	26 August 2021	2021	
200 m	22.07 (+1.6 m/s)	Merlene Ottey	Jamaica	5 July 1995	1995	
400 m	49.17	Salwa Eid Naser	Bahrain	5 July 2019	2019	
800 m	1:55.33	Audrey Werro	Switzerland	21 August 2026	2026	
1500 m	3:57.34	Shelby Houlihan	United States	5 July 2018	2018	
Mile	4:16.05	Genzebe Dibaba	Ethiopia	6 July 2017	2017	
3000 m	8:21.50	Diribe Welteji	Ethiopia	22 August 2024	2024	
100 m hurdles	12.27 (−0.2 m/s)	Masai Russell	United States	21 August 2026	2026	
400 m hurdles	52.25	Femke Bol	Netherlands	22 August 2024	2024	
3000 m steeplechase	9:00.04	Winfred Yavi	Bahrain	21 August 2026	2026	
High jump	2.06 m	Mariya Lasitskene	Russia	6 July 2017	2017	
Pole vault	4.93 m	Yelena Isinbayeva	Russia	5 July 2005	2005	
Long jump	7.48 m (+0.4 m/s)	Heike Drechsler	Germany	8 July 1992	1992	
Triple jump	15.52 m (+0.6 m/s) DLR	Yulimar Rojas	Venezuela	26 August 2021	2021	
Shot put	20.95 m	Valerie Adams	New Zealand	23 August 2012	2012	
Discus throw	68.96 m	Sandra Perković	Croatia	4 July 2013	2013	
Javelin throw	69.58 m (old design)	Natalya Shikolenko	Bulgaria	6 July 1994	1994	
Javelin throw	68.43 m (current design)	Sara Kolak	Croatia	6 July 2017	2017	
4 × 100 m relay	42.03	Dina Asher-Smith; Desiree Henry; Bianca Williams; Amy Hunt	Great Britain	22 August 2024	2024	

== See also ==
- Spitzen Leichtathletik Luzern
- Weltklasse Zürich
