= 1999 IAAF Golden League =

The 1999 IAAF Golden League was the second edition of the annual international track and field meeting series, held from 30 June to 7 September. It was contested at seven European meetings: the Bislett Games, Golden Gala, Meeting de Paris, Herculis, Weltklasse Zürich, Memorial Van Damme and the Internationales Stadionfest (ISTAF).

The Golden League jackpot consisted of 50 kilograms of gold bars. The jackpot was available to athletes who won at least five of the seven competitions of the series in one of the 13 specified events (8 for men, 5 for women). The jackpot events for 1999 were:

- Men: 200 m, 800 m, 5000 m, 110 m hurdles, 3000 m steeplechase, long jump, pole vault, javelin throw
- Women: 200 m, 800 m, 3000 m, 400 m hurdles, high jump

The jackpot winners were Gabriela Szabo of Romania (3000 metres) and Wilson Kipketer of Denmark (800 metres). Kenya's Bernard Barmasai came within half a second of sharing the jackpot: after amassing six straight wins in the steeplechase, he lost to Ali Ezzine by 0.32 seconds. Marion Jones won the first five women's 200 m races, but did not compete in the last two meetings.

== Results ==
=== Men ===
Event	Bislett Games 30 June	Golden Gala 7 July	Meeting de Paris 21 July	Herculis 4 August	Weltklasse Zürich 11 August	Memorial Van Damme 3 September	ISTAF 7 September
100 m	John Ertzgaard (NOR) 10.27	—	Maurice Greene (USA) 9.85	—	Maurice Greene (USA) 9.99	Bruny Surin (CAN) 10.04	Bruny Surin (CAN) 10.07
200 m	Obadele Thompson (BAR) 20.38	Maurice Greene (USA) 20.13	Michael Johnson (USA) 19.93	Maurice Greene (USA) 19.92	Frankie Fredericks (NAM) 20.23	Michael Johnson (USA) 19.93	Maurice Greene (USA) 20.21
400 m	Sugath Thilakaratne (SRI) 45.18	—	—	—	Antonio Pettigrew (USA) 44.72	—	—
800 m	Wilson Kipketer (DEN) 1:43.11	Wilson Kipketer (DEN) 1:44.89	Wilson Kipketer (DEN) 1:42.79	Wilson Kipketer (DEN) 1:42.57	Wilson Kipketer (DEN) 1:43.01	Wilson Kipketer (DEN) 1:42.27	Wilson Kipketer (DEN) 1:44.03
1500 m Mile run 2000 m	—	Hicham El Guerrouj (MAR) 3:43.13 WR	Noah Ngeny (KEN) 3:28.84	Noah Ngeny (KEN) 3:29.79	Hicham El Guerrouj (MAR) 3:28.57	Noah Ngeny (KEN) 3:29.19	Hicham El Guerrouj (MAR) 4:44.79 WR
3000 m 5000 m	Haile Gebrselassie (ETH) 12:53.92	Daniel Komen (KEN) 7:33.23	Daniel Komen (KEN) 12:55.16	Benjamin Limo (KEN) 7:28.67	Haile Gebrselassie (ETH) 12:49.64	Hicham El Guerrouj (MAR) 7:23.09	Benjamin Limo (KEN) 12:59.54
10,000 m	—	—	—	—	—	Charles Kamathi (KEN) 26:51.49	—
3000 m s'chase	Bernard Barmasai (KEN) 8:06.15	Bernard Barmasai (KEN) 8:05.71	Bernard Barmasai (KEN) 8:03.30	Bernard Barmasai (KEN) 7:58.98	Bernard Barmasai (KEN) 8:05.16	Bernard Barmasai (KEN) 8:03.08	Ali Ezzine (MAR) 8:06.70
110 m hurdles	Allen Johnson (USA) 13.14	Larry Wade (USA) 13.26	Allen Johnson (USA) 13.01	Mark Crear (USA) 13.14	Mark Crear (USA) 13.19	Mark Crear (USA) 13.15	Larry Wade (USA) 13.27
400 m hurdles	—	—	—	Angelo Taylor (USA) 48.41	Chris Rawlinson (GBR) 48.14	—	—
Pole vault	Tim Lobinger (GER) 6.00	Maksim Tarasov (RUS) 5.90	Maksim Tarasov (RUS) 5.90	Maksim Tarasov (RUS) 6.00	Jeff Hartwig (USA) 5.91	Jeff Hartwig (USA) 5.95	Maksim Tarasov (RUS) 6.01
High jump	Javier Sotomayor (CUB) 2.28	—	—	—	—	—	Wolfgang Kreißig (GER) 2.32
Long jump	Erick Walder (USA) 8.50w	James Beckford (JAM) 8.42	Erick Walder (USA) 8.18	James Beckford (JAM) 8.40	Iván Pedroso (CUB) 8.39	Iván Pedroso (CUB) 8.40	Iván Pedroso (CUB) 8.22
Discus throw	—	—	Anthony Washington (USA) 66.40	—	Lars Riedel (GER) 67.64	Lars Riedel (GER) 66.44	Lars Riedel (GER) 68.41
Javelin throw	Raymond Hecht (GER) 88.27	Jan Železný (CZE) 89.06	Konstadinos Gatsioudis (GRE) 86.92	Konstadinos Gatsioudis (GRE) 87.95	Konstadinos Gatsioudis (GRE) 89.53	Konstadinos Gatsioudis (GRE) 87.26	Konstadinos Gatsioudis (GRE) 87.96

=== Women ===
Event	Bislett Games 30 June	Golden Gala 7 July	Meeting de Paris 21 July	Herculis 4 August	Weltklasse Zürich 11 August	Memorial Van Damme 3 September	ISTAF 7 September
100 m	—	—	—	—	Gabi Rockmeier (GER) 11.48	—	—
200 m	Marion Jones (USA) 22.22	Marion Jones (USA) 21.99	Marion Jones (USA) 22.19	Marion Jones (USA) 22.15	Marion Jones (USA) 22.10	Inger Miller (USA) 22.24	Debbie Ferguson (BAH) 22.55
400 m	—	—	—	Cathy Freeman (AUS) 49.76	—	—	—
800 m	Svetlana Masterkova (RUS) 1:58.16	Maria Mutola (MOZ) 1:58.25	Svetlana Masterkova (RUS) 1:57.63	Maria Mutola (MOZ) 1:56.99	Maria Mutola (MOZ) 1:56.04	Svetlana Masterkova (RUS) 1:57.58	Maria Mutola (MOZ) 1:57.56
1500 m Mile run	—	—	—	Violeta Szekely (ROM) 4:01.49	Violeta Szekely (ROM) 3:59.31	—	—
3000 m 5000 m	Gabriela Szabo (ROM) 8:27.21	Gabriela Szabo (ROM) 8:25.59	Gabriela Szabo (ROM) 8:27.79	Gabriela Szabo (ROM) 8:28.36	Gabriela Szabo (ROM) 8:25.03	Gabriela Szabo (ROM) 8:25.82	Gabriela Szabo (ROM) 14:40.59
100 m hurdles	—	Olga Shishigina (KAZ) 12.50	—	Glory Alozie (NGR) 12.53	Olga Shishigina (KAZ) 12.55	—	—
400 m hurdles	Deon Hemmings (JAM) 53.48	Nezha Bidouane (MAR) 53.75	Nezha Bidouane (MAR) 53.05	Deon Hemmings (JAM) 53.74	Deon Hemmings (JAM) 53.30	Nezha Bidouane (MAR) 53.78	Deon Hemmings (JAM) 53.90
High jump	Monica Iagăr (ROM) 1.96	Hestrie Cloete (RSA) 2.00	Yelena Yelesina (RUS) 2.00	Hestrie Cloete (RSA) 2.04	Inha Babakova (UKR) 2.01	Kajsa Bergqvist (SWE) 1.97	Hestrie Cloete (RSA) 1.95
Long jump	—	Eunice Barber (FRA) 7.01	—	—	—	—	—
Triple jump	—	—	Paraskevi Tsiamita (GRE) 14.77	—	Paraskevi Tsiamita (GRE) 14.75	Paraskevi Tsiamita (GRE) 14.83	—
Shot put	—	—	—	—	—	—	Astrid Kumbernuss (GER) 19.53
Discus throw	—	—	—	—	—	—	Franka Dietzsch (GER) 66.60
Javelin throw	Tanja Damaske (GER) 65.47	—	—	—	—	—	—
