= Meeting Lille-Métropole =

Annual athletics competition in Lille, France

Coordinates: 50°37′52″N 3°08′15″E

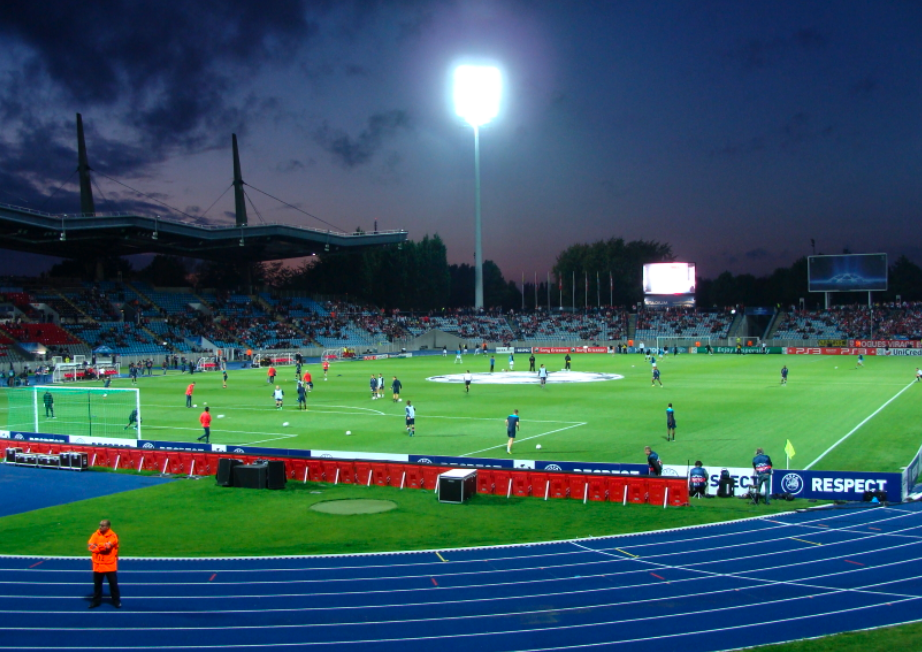
- The host stadium
- Date: June/July
- Location: Villeneuve-d'Ascq, France
- Event type: Track and field
- Established: 1995
- Last held: 2012
- Website: Meeting de Athletismo Madrid

The Meeting Lille Métropole was an annual one-day outdoor track and field meeting at the Stadium Lille Métropole in Villeneuve-d'Ascq, France. It has featured on the Pro Athlé Tour of French track and field meetings, has received European Athletics permit meeting status, and was part of the IAAF Grand Prix circuit from 2003 to 2005.

The history of the competition is connected to the Meeting de Paris, which was held in Lille from 1988–1994 due to ongoing work at the Stade Sébastien Charléty. Once the Paris meeting returned to the capital, the Lille meeting was established in its own right in 1995. The competition was incorporated into the national Pro Athlé Tour in 2009, 2010 and 2012. The meeting was not held in 2011 as the 2011 World Youth Championships in Athletics was held at the stadium instead. The 2012 meeting was the last edition to be held.
