= Weltklasse in Köln =

German track and field competition

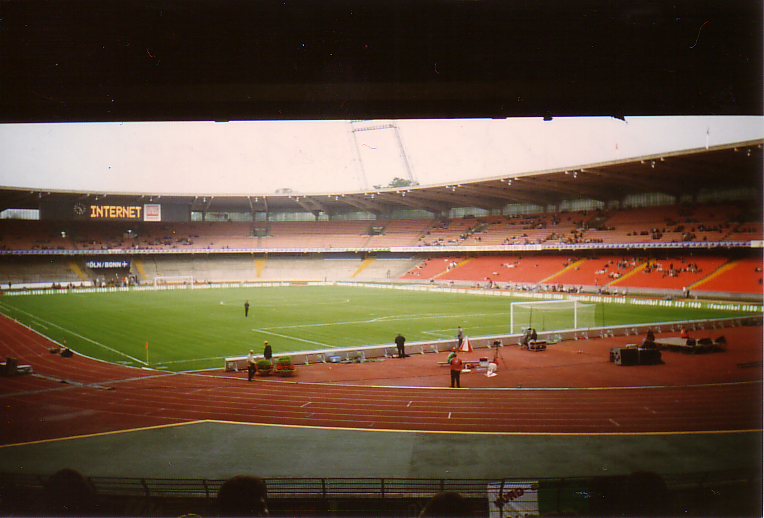
- The host stadium
- Date: August
- Location: Cologne, Germany
- Event type: Track and field
- Established: 1934
- Last held: 1999

The Weltklasse in Köln was an annual one-day outdoor track and field meeting at the Müngersdorfer Stadion in Cologne, Germany. First held in 1934, it was organised by ASV Köln until 1999, when the meeting folded after its fiftieth edition due to financial reasons. Despite the meeting's long history, it was not included in the IAAF's international circuit, although it did receive IAAF Grand Prix status for its final edition.

Earlier in its history, the meeting was known as the ASV-Sportfest or Internationale Leichtathletik-Sportfest. Following its establishment in 1934, the meeting's second edition hosted several newly crowned Olympic champions in 1936 after the Berlin Olympics. It played host to the German Athletics Championships in 1947. The meeting returned after World War II with a meeting in 1952 and the first world record was set at the stadium in 1958, courtesy of the German men's 4 × 100 metres relay team. The 1980s and 1990s saw several more world records set at the Müngersdorfer Stadion. Former sprinter Manfred Germar was head of the organising committee for its final three decades.

== World records ==
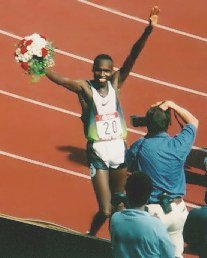
Wilson Kipketer celebrating his world record in Cologne

World records set at the Weltklasse in Köln
Year	Event	Record	Athlete	Nationality
1958, 29 August	4 × 100 m relay	39.5 h	Manfred Steinbach; Martin Lauer; Heinz Fütterer; Manfred Germar	Germany
1983, 28 August	1500 m	3:31.24	Sydney Maree	United States
1983, 28 August	Pole vault	5.82 m	Pierre Quinon	France
1986, 17 August	100 m hurdles	12.35	Yordanka Donkova	Bulgaria
1986, 17 August	100 m hurdles	12.29	Yordanka Donkova	Bulgaria
1989, 20 August	3000 m	7:29.45	Saïd Aouita	Morocco
1992, 17 August	3000 m	7:28.96	Moses Kiptanui	Kenya
1995, 18 August	Pole vault	4.20 m	Daniela Bártová	Czech Republic
1997, 24 August	800 m	1:41.11	Wilson Kipketer	Denmark
1997, 24 August	3000 m steeplechase	7:55.72	Bernard Barmasai	Kenya
