= Memorial Van Damme =

Athletics tournament held in Belgium

- Date: Late August – early September
- Location: Brussels, Belgium
- Event type: Track and field
- World Athletics Cat.: GW/DF
- Established: 16 August 1977; 49 years ago
- Website: Memorial Van Damme
- 2026 Memorial Van Damme

The Memorial Van Damme is an annual athletics event at the King Baudouin Stadium in Brussels, Belgium, that takes place in late August or early September. Previously one of the IAAF Golden League events, it now serves as a final event of the Diamond League, along with Weltklasse Zürich between 2010 and 2019. In 2024 and 2026, Memorial Van Damme will serve as the sole final of the Diamond League.

It was first organized in 1977 by a group of journalists in honour of Ivo Van Damme, a Belgian double medal winner at the Montreal Olympics who was killed the previous year in a car accident at the age of 22.

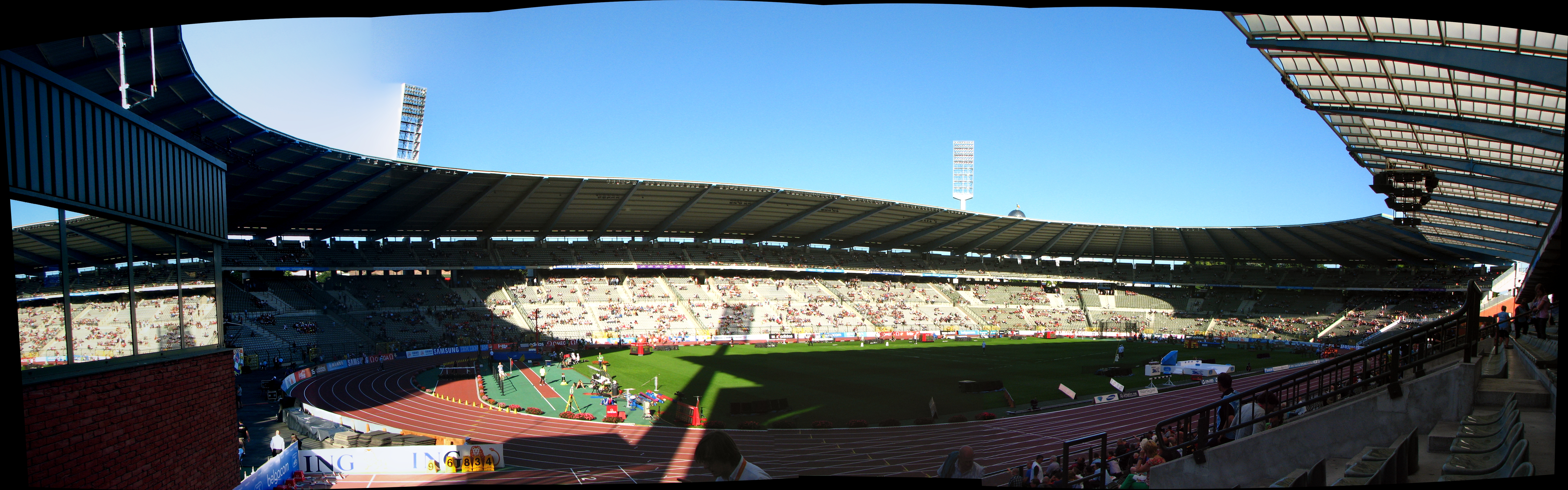
King Baudouin Stadium during the 2012 edition

== Editions ==
Memorial Van Damme editions
Ed.	Meeting	Series	Date	Ref.
1st	1977 Memorial Van Damme		16 Aug 1977	
2nd	1978 Memorial Van Damme		18 Aug 1978	
3rd	1979 Memorial Van Damme		4 Sep 1979	
4th	1980 Memorial Van Damme		22 Aug 1980	
5th	1981 Memorial Van Damme		28 Aug 1981	
6th	1982 Memorial Van Damme		27 Aug 1982	
7th	1983 Memorial Van Damme		26 Aug 1983	
8th	1984 Memorial Van Damme		24 Aug 1984	
9th	1985 Memorial Van Damme	1985 IAAF Grand Prix	30 Aug 1985	
10th	1986 Memorial Van Damme	1986 IAAF Grand Prix	5 Sep 1986	
11th	1987 Memorial Van Damme	1987 IAAF Grand Prix	11 Sep 1987	
12th	1988 Memorial Van Damme	1988 IAAF Grand Prix	19 Aug 1988	
13th	1989 Memorial Van Damme	1989 IAAF Grand Prix	25 Aug 1989	
14th	1990 Memorial Van Damme	1990 IAAF Grand Prix	10 Aug 1990	
15th	1991 Memorial Van Damme	1991 IAAF Grand Prix	13 Sep 1991	
16th	1992 Memorial Van Damme	1992 IAAF Grand Prix	28 Aug 1992	
17th	1993 Memorial Van Damme	1993 IAAF Grand Prix	3 Sep 1993	
18th	1994 Memorial Van Damme	1994 IAAF Grand Prix	19 Aug 1994	
19th	1995 Memorial Van Damme	1995 IAAF Grand Prix	25 Aug 1995	
20th	1996 Memorial Van Damme	1996 IAAF Grand Prix	23 Aug 1996	
21st	1997 Memorial Van Damme	1997 IAAF Grand Prix	22 Aug 1997	
22nd	1998 Memorial Van Damme	1998 IAAF Golden League	28 Aug 1998	
23rd	1999 Memorial Van Damme	1999 IAAF Golden League	3 Sep 1999	
24th	2000 Memorial Van Damme	2000 IAAF Golden League	28 Aug 2000	
25th	2001 Memorial Van Damme	2001 IAAF Golden League	24 Aug 2001	
26th	2002 Memorial Van Damme	2002 IAAF Golden League	30 Aug 2002	
27th	2003 Memorial Van Damme	2003 IAAF Golden League	5 Sep 2003	
28th	2004 Memorial Van Damme	2004 IAAF Golden League	2–3 Sep 2004	
29th	2005 Memorial Van Damme	2005 IAAF Golden League	26 Aug 2005	
30th	2006 Memorial Van Damme	2006 IAAF Golden League	25 Aug 2006	
31st	2007 Memorial Van Damme	2007 IAAF Golden League	14 Sep 2007	
32nd	2008 Memorial Van Damme	2008 IAAF Golden League	5 Sep 2008	
33rd	2009 Memorial Van Damme	2009 IAAF Golden League	4 Sep 2009	
34th	2010 Memorial Van Damme	2010 Diamond League	27 Aug 2010	
35th	2011 Memorial Van Damme	2011 Diamond League	16 Sep 2011	
36th	2012 Memorial Van Damme	2012 Diamond League	7 Sep 2012	
37th	2013 Memorial Van Damme	2013 Diamond League	6 Sep 2013	
38th	2014 Memorial Van Damme	2014 Diamond League	5 Sep 2014	
39th	2015 Memorial Van Damme	2015 Diamond League	11 Sep 2015	
40th	2016 Memorial Van Damme	2016 Diamond League	8–9 Sep 2016	
41st	2017 Memorial Van Damme	2017 Diamond League	31 Aug, 1 Sep 2017	
42nd	2018 Memorial Van Damme	2018 Diamond League	30–31 Aug 2018	
43rd	2019 Memorial Van Damme	2019 Diamond League	5–6 Sep 2019	
44th	2020 Memorial Van Damme	2020 Diamond League	4 Sep 2020	
45th	2021 Memorial Van Damme	2021 Diamond League	1 Sep, 3 Sep 2021	
46th	2022 Memorial Van Damme	2022 Diamond League	1–2 Sep 2022	
47th	2023 Memorial Van Damme	2023 Diamond League	7–8 Sep 2023	
48th	2024 Memorial Van Damme	2024 Diamond League	13–14 Sep 2024	
49th	2025 Memorial Van Damme	2025 Diamond League	22 Aug 2025	
50th	2026 Memorial Van Damme	2026 Diamond League	4–5 Sep 2026	

== World records ==
Over the course of its history, numerous world records have been set at Memorial Van Damme.

World records set at the Memorial Van Damme
Year	Event	Record	Athlete	Nationality
1981	Mile	3:47.33	Sebastian Coe	United Kingdom
1995	5000 m	13:07.38 WJR	Daniel Komen	Kenya
1995	1000 m	2:29.34	Maria de Lurdes Mutola	Mozambique
1996	10,000 m	26:38.08	Salah Hissou	Morocco
1996	1000 m	2:28.98	Svetlana Masterkova	Russia
1997	5000 m	12:39.74	Daniel Komen	Kenya
1997	10,000 m	26:27.85	Paul Tergat	Kenya
2001	3000 m	7:30.67 WJR	Kenenisa Bekele	Ethiopia
2001	3000 m steeplechase	7:55.28	Brahim Boulami	Morocco
2004	10,000 m	27:04.00 WJR	Boniface Toroitich Kiprop	Uganda
2004	3000 m steeplechase	7:53.63	Saif Saaeed Shaheen	Qatar
2004	Pole vault	4.92 m	Yelena Isinbayeva	Russia
2005	10,000 m	26:17.53	Kenenisa Bekele	Ethiopia
2006	4 × 800 m relay	7:02.43	Joseph Mutua; William Yiampoy; Ismael Kombich; Wilfred Bungei	Kenya
2007	Two miles	8:58.58	Meseret Defar	Ethiopia
2009	4 × 1500 m relay	14:36.23	William Biwott Tanui; Gideon Gathimba; Geoffrey Kipkoech Rono; Augustine Kiprono Choge	Kenya
2012	110 m hurdles	12.80 (+0.3 m/s)	Aries Merritt	United States
2020	20,000 m (track)	56:20.02+	Bashir Abdi	Belgium
2020	One hour	21,330 m	Mo Farah	Great Britain
2020	One hour	18,930 m	Sifan Hassan	Netherlands
2020	T51 100 m	19.71 (+0.4 m/s)	Peter Genyn	Belgium
2023	2000 m	4:43.13	Jakob Ingebrigtsen	Norway
2025	Mile steeplechase	4:40.13	Winfred Yavi	Bahrain

== Meeting records ==
=== Men ===
Men's meeting records of the Memorial Van Damme
Event	Record	Athlete	Nationality	Date	Meet	Ref.	Video
100 m	9.76 (+1.3 m/s)	Usain Bolt	Jamaica	16 September 2011	2011		
200 m	19.26 (+0.7 m/s) DLR	Yohan Blake	Jamaica	16 September 2011	2011		
300 m	32.22	Butch Reynolds	United States	19 Augustus 1988	1988		
400 m	43.40 DLR	Collen Kebinatshipi	Botswana	4 September 2026	2026		
800 m	1:41.80	Emmanuel Wanyonyi	Kenya	4 September 2026	2026		
1000 m	2:14.95	Sammy Koskei	Kenya	30 August 1985	1985		
1500 m	3:26.12	Hicham El Guerrouj	Morocco	24 August 2001	2001		
Mile	3:47.30	Noureddine Morceli	Algeria	3 September 1993	1993		
2000 m	4:43.13 WR	Jakob Ingebrigtsen	Norway	8 September 2023	2023		
3000 m	7:23.09	Hicham El Guerrouj	Morocco	3 September 1999	1999		
5000 m	12:39.74	Daniel Komen	Kenya	22 August 1997	1997		
10,000 m	26:17.53	Kenenisa Bekele	Ethiopia	26 August 2005	2005		
15,000 m	41:51.64+	Sabastian Sawe	Kenya	1 September 2022	2022		
10 Miles	44:57.65+	Sabastian Sawe	Kenya	1 September 2022	2022		
20,000 m	56:20.02+ WR	Bashir Abdi	Belgium	4 September 2020	2020		
One hour	21,330 m DLR	Mo Farah	Great Britain	4 September 2020	2020		
110 m hurdles	12.80 (+0.3 m/s) DLR	Aries Merritt	United States	7 September 2012	2012		
400 m hurdles	46.70	Alison dos Santos	Brazil	5 September 2026	2026		
2000 m steeplechase	5:30.7+ h	Joseph Mahmoud	France	24 August 1984	1984		
3000 m steeplechase	7:53.63	Saif Saaeed Shaheen	Qatar	3 September 2004	2004		
High jump	2.43 m DLR	Mutaz Essa Barshim	Qatar	5 September 2014	2014		
Pole vault	6.12 m	Emmanouil Karalis	Greece	4 September 2026	2026		
Long jump	8.65 m (+0.2 m/s)	Carl Lewis	United States	24 August 1984	1984		
Triple jump	17.74 m (−0.6 m/s)	Andy Díaz	Italy	5 September 2026	2026		
Shot put	23.08 m	Rajindra Campbell	Jamaica	5 September 2026	2026		
Discus throw	71.29 m	Kristjan Čeh	Slovenia	4 September 2026	2026		
Hammer throw	82.26 m	Lance Deal	United States	23 August 1996	1996		
Javelin throw	93.48 m (old design)	Tom Petranoff	United States	26 August 1983	1983		
Javelin throw	90.50 m (current design)	Jan Železný	Czech Republic	25 August 1995	1995		
4 × 100 m relay	38.49	Xavi Mo-Ajok; Taymir Burnet; Hensley Paulina; Raphael Bouju	Netherlands	8 September 2023	2023		
4 × 400 m relay	3:05.57	Olympic Essenbeek Halle: Jonathan Sacoor; Tuur Bras; Kevin Borlée; Dylan Borlée	Belgium	14 September 2024	2024		
4 × 800 m relay	7:02.43	Joseph Mwengi Mutua; William Yiampoy; Ismael Kipngetich Kombich; Wilfred Bungei	Kenya	25 August 2006	2006		
4 × 1500 m relay	14:36.23	William Biwott Tanui; Gideon Gathimba; Geoffrey Rono; Augustine Choge	Kenya	4 September 2009	2009		

=== Women ===
Women's meeting records of the Memorial Van Damme
Event	Record	Athlete	Nationality	Date	Meet	Ref.
100 m	10.72 (−0.3 m/s)	Shelly-Ann Fraser-Pryce	Jamaica	6 September 2013	2013	
100 m	10.72 (+0.6 m/s)	Elaine Thompson	Jamaica	9 September 2016	2016	
200 m	21.48 (+0.2 m/s) DLR	Shericka Jackson	Jamaica	8 September 2023	2023	
400 m	48.64	Marileidy Paulino	Dominican Republic	5 September 2026	2026	
800 m	1:54.75	Audrey Werro	Switzerland	5 September 2026	2026	
1000 m	2:28.98	Svetlana Masterkova	Russia	23 August 1996	1996	
1500 m	3:54.05	Klaudia Kazimierska	Poland	5 September 2026	2026	
Mile	4:14.74	Sifan Hassan	Netherlands	3 September 2021	2021	
2000 m	5:30.19	Gelete Burka	Ethiopia	4 September 2009	2009	
3000 m	8:24.81+	Meseret Defar	Ethiopia	14 September 2007	2007	
Two miles	8:58.58 WB	Meseret Defar	Ethiopia	14 September 2007	2007	
5000 m	14:09.82	Beatrice Chebet	Kenya	14 September 2024	2024	
One hour	18,930 m DLR	Sifan Hassan	Netherlands	4 September 2020	2020	
100 m hurdles	12.20 (+1.0 m/s)	Masai Russell	United States	5 September 2026	2026	
400 m hurdles	52.11	Femke Bol	Netherlands	8 September 2023	2023	
Mile steeplechase	4:40.13 WB	Winfred Yavi	Bahrain	22 August 2025	2025	
3000 m steeplechase	8:51.61	Faith Cherotich	Kenya	4 September 2026	2026	
High jump	2.05 m	Anna Chicherova	Russia	16 September 2011	2011	
High jump	2.05 m	Yaroslava Mahuchikh	Ukraine	2 September 2022	2022	
Pole vault	5.00 m	Sandi Morris	United States	9 September 2016	2016	
Long jump	7.25 m (+1.7 m/s)	Heike Drechsler	Germany	13 September 1991	1991	
Triple jump	15.14 m (+0.3 m/s)	Tatyana Lebedeva	Russia	5 September 2003	2003	
Shot put	21.14 m DLR	Chase Jackson	United States	4 September 2026	2026	
Discus throw	69.84 m	Tsvetanka Christova	Bulgaria	5 September 1986	1986	
Javelin throw	72.18 m (old design)	Fatima Whitbread	Great Britain	5 September 1986	1986	
Javelin throw	68.42 m (current design)	Yan Ziyi	China	5 September 2026	2026	
4 × 100 m relay	42.97	Gwen Torrence; Sheila Echols; Dannette Young; Evelyn Ashford	United States	19 August 1988	1988	
4 × 400 m relay	3:42.09	Atletiekvereniging Lyra Lierse: Jitse Steenmans; Elise Mehuys; Messalina Pieroni; Lien Torfs	Belgium	14 September 2024	2024	

=== Mixed ===
Mixed meeting records of the Memorial Van Damme
Event	Record	Athlete	Nationality	Date	Meet	Ref.
4 × 100 m relay	40.96	Netherlands Orange: Elvis Afrifa; Minke Bisschops; Nsikak Ekpo; Britt de Blaauw	Netherlands	22 August 2025	2025	
