= IAAF World Outdoor Meetings =

- Sport: Outdoor track and field
- Founded: 2003
- Ceased: 2005
- Continent: Global

The IAAF World Outdoor Meetings were an annual, global circuit of one-day outdoor track and field competitions organized by the International Association of Athletics Federations (IAAF). It was created in 2003 building upon the IAAF Grand Prix series held since 1985. The series incorporated four categories of competitions: the IAAF Golden League, IAAF Super Grand Prix, IAAF Grand Prix I and IAAF Grand Prix II. The reorganisation came with the introduction of the IAAF World Rankings system. Athletes scored points based on their performances at the series meetings and the highest scoring athletes in each event were invited to compete at the IAAF World Athletics Final. The series lasted only three years before being reorganised into the IAAF World Athletics Tour.

Prior to 2003, the IAAF Grand Prix had featured four levels (Golden League, Grand Prix I and II, and IAAF Permit Meetings) and an IAAF Grand Prix Final with a limited set of events. The World Outdoor Meetings series made the Permit Meetings defunct, with most such meetings being merged into the Grand Prix II level, introduced the Super Grand Prix as the secondary level of competition, and replaced the Grand Prix Final with the World Athletics Final.

== Editions ==
A total of five meeting categories existed over the lifetime of the circuit:

- GL : IAAF Golden League
- SGP : IAAF Super Grand Prix
- GP : IAAF Grand Prix
- GP2 : IAAF Grand Prix II
- WAF : IAAF World Athletics Final

Edition	Year	Start date	End date	Meets	GL	SGP	GP	GP2	Final	Final date	Ref.
1	2003	1 March	7 September	34	6	7	10	11	2003 IAAF World Athletics Final	13–14 September	
2	2004	12 February	12 September	34	6	8	9	11	2004 IAAF World Athletics Final	18–19 September	
3	2005	17 February	4 September	34	6	8	10	10	2005 IAAF World Athletics Final	9–10 September	

== Meetings ==
The IAAF World Outdoor Meetings calendar remained mostly unchanged during its three years of existence. A total of 34 meetings were present for each season. The Qatar Athletic Super Grand Prix was added to the Super Grand Prix Level for the second and third years. The Helsinki Grand Prix was dropped from the Grand Prix category in 2004. The Adidas Oregon Track Classic was dropped from the Grand Prix II category in 2005. The Grand Prix II meeting Cena Slovenska - Slovak Gold was held in the first year only and was replaced by the Grande Premio Rio de Atletismo meet for the final two years.

Athletes received points based on their performances at the meetings on the circuit, with more points being given at the more prestigious and competitive competitions.

#	Meeting	City	Country	2003	2004	2005
1	ISTAF Berlin	Berlin	Germany	GL	GL	GL
2	Bislett Games	Oslo	Norway	GL	GL	GL
3	Golden Gala	Rome	Italy	GL	GL	GL
4	Weltklasse Zürich	Zürich	Switzerland	GL	GL	GL
5	Memorial Van Damme	Brussels	Belgium	GL	GL	GL
6	Meeting Areva	Saint-Denis	France	GL	GL	GL
7	Herculis	Monte Carlo	Monaco	WAF	WAF	WAF
8	Athletissima	Lausanne	Switzerland	SGP	SGP	SGP
9	London Grand Prix	London	United Kingdom	SGP	SGP	SGP
10	DN Galan	Stockholm	Sweden	SGP	SGP	SGP
11	British Grand Prix	Gateshead	United Kingdom	SGP	SGP	SGP
12	Athens Grand Prix Tsiklitiria	Athens	Greece	SGP	SGP	SGP
13	Golden Spike Ostrava	Ostrava	Czech Republic	SGP	SGP	SGP
14	Meeting de Atletismo Madrid	Madrid	Spain	SGP	SGP	SGP
15	Qatar Athletic Super Grand Prix	Doha	Qatar	-	SGP	SGP
16	Prefontaine Classic	Eugene	United States	GP	GP	GP
17	Osaka Grand Prix	Osaka	Japan	GP	GP	GP
18	Grande Premio Brasil Caixa de Atletismo	Belém	Brazil	GP	GP	GP
19	Meeting Lille-Métropole	Villeneuve-d'Ascq	France	GP	GP	GP
20	FBK Games	Hengelo	Netherlands	GP	GP	GP
21	Rieti Meeting	Rieti	Italy	GP	GP	GP
22	Hanžeković Memorial	Zagreb	Croatia	GP	GP	GP
23	Gran Premio Diputación	Seville	Spain	GP	GP	GP
24	Gugl Grand Prix	Linz	Austria	GP	GP	GP
25	Helsinki Grand Prix	Helsinki	Finland	GP	-	GP
26	Melbourne Track Classic	Melbourne	Australia	GP2	GP2	GP2
27	Brothers Znamensky Memorial	Kazan	Russia	GP2	GP2	GP2
28	International Meeting Thessaloniki	Thessaloniki	Greece	GP2	GP2	GP2
29	Palo Alto Meeting	Palo Alto	United States	GP2	GP2	GP2
30	Meeting du Conseil Général de la Martinique	Fort-de-France	France	GP2	GP2	GP2
31	Notturna di Milano	Milan	Italy	GP2	GP2	GP2
32	Memorial Primo Nebiolo	Turin	Italy	GP2	GP2	GP2
33	Josef Odložil Memorial	Prague	Czech Republic	GP2	GP2	GP2
34	KBC Night of Athletics	Heusden-Zolder	Belgium	GP2	GP2	GP2
35	Adidas Oregon Track Classic	Gresham	United States	GP2	GP2	-
36	Cena Slovenska - Slovak Gold	Bratislava	Slovakia	GP2	-	-
37	Grande Premio Rio de Atletismo	Rio de Janeiro	Brazil	-	GP2	GP2

- The 2003 Athens Grand Prix Tsiklitiria was held in Trikala and the 2004 meeting in Heraklion
- The 2003 Brothers Znamensky Memorial was held in Tula, Russia
- The 2004 Adidas Oregon Track Classic was held in Portland, Oregon
