= 2003 IAAF World Outdoor Meetings =

- Edition: 1st
- Dates: 1 March – 13 September
- Meetings: 34 (+1 final)

The 2003 IAAF World Outdoor Meetings was the first edition of the annual global series of one-day track and field competitions organized by the International Association of Athletics Federations (IAAF). It replaced the IAAF Grand Prix as the IAAF's primary outdoor track and field series. Compared to the 2002 IAAF Grand Prix, a new tier of meetings – IAAF Super Grand Prix – was introduced and the IAAF Permit Meetings concept was dropped. The series had four levels: 2003 IAAF Golden League, Super Grand Prix, Grand Prix and Grand Prix II. There were 6 Golden League meetings, Super Grand Prix category featured 7 meetings from 12 June to 8 August, the IAAF Grand Prix category featured 10 meetings from 4 May to 7 September and Grand Prix II featured 11 meetings from 1 March to 3 August, making a combined total of 34 meetings for the series.

The Herculis meeting was dropped from the Golden League circuit as it was given the role of host of the new series-ending IAAF World Athletics Final, which had an expanded programme of events compared to the IAAF Grand Prix Final of previous years. The changes to the tiers of the series saw the meeting schedule expanded by nearly 50%. The Super Grand Prix meetings saw two new additions to the circuit (Golden Spike Ostrava and the Meeting de Madrid) with the other five being former Grand Prix meetings. At the Grand Prix level, the sole new introduction was the Meeting Lille-Métropole (formerly an IAAF Permit Meeting) which was supplemented by existing Grand Prix level meetings and the promotion of the Fanny Blankers-Koen Games, Meeting de Atletismo Sevilla, Grand Prix Zagreb, Gugl-Meeting, Asics GP Helsinki and the Rieti Meeting from Grand Prix II status. The Grand Prix II meetings were mostly upgraded IAAF Permit Meetings (Meeting du Conseil General de la Martinique, Notturna di Milano, Memorial Primo Nebiolo, Brothers Znamensky Memorial, Josef Odložil Memorial, KBC Night of Athletics and International Meeting Thessaloniki) with four pre-existing GPII meetings retaining that status.

Four meetings changed venue from 2002: the Grand Prix Brasil de Atletismo was moved from Rio de Janeiro to Belém and the Tsiklitiria meeting was moved from Athens to Tríkala, the second British meeting moved from Sheffield to Gateshead, and the Oregon Track Classic moved from Portland to Gresham, Oregon. Despite the expansion of the series schedule, two meetings lost Grand Prix status: the Engen Grand Prix in Pretoria and the Qatar Athletic Grand Prix in Doha (which was not held that year).

Performances on designated events on the circuit earned athletes points which qualified them for entry to the 2003 IAAF World Athletics Final, held on 13–14 September in Monaco. This competition replaced the IAAF Grand Prix Final, with the key difference being that the new final held a full set of track and field events, rather than the rotating partial event schedule of the Grand Prix Final. The points scoring format of previous years was replaced with a world rankings system which scored athletes on both their finishing position at qualifying meetings and also the standard of their performance based on IAAF Scoring Tables. The world rankings system formed the selection criteria for entry to the World Athletics Final rather than exclusively placings at IAAF Grand Prix meetings.

== Meetings ==
#	Date	Meeting name	City	Country	Level
1	1 March	Telstra A-Series Melbourne	Melbourne	Australia	IAAF Grand Prix II
2	26 April	Meeting du Conseil General de la Martinique	Fort-de-France	France	IAAF Grand Prix II
3	4 May	Grande Premio de Brasil de Atletismo	Belém	Brazil	IAAF Grand Prix I
4	10 May	Japan Grand Prix	Osaka	Japan	IAAF Grand Prix I
5	17 May	Adidas Oregon Track Classic	Gresham	United States	IAAF Grand Prix II
6	24 May	Prefontaine Classic	Eugene	United States	IAAF Grand Prix I
7	1 June	THALES FBK-Games	Hengelo	Netherlands	IAAF Grand Prix I
8	3 June	Notturna di Milano	Milan	Italy	IAAF Grand Prix II
9	6 June	Meeting Memorial Primo Nebiolo	Turin	Italy	IAAF Grand Prix II
10	7 June	U.S. Track & Field Open	Palo Alto	United States	IAAF Grand Prix II
11	7 June	Meeting de Atletismo Sevilla	Seville	Spain	IAAF Grand Prix I
12	8 June	Znamenski Memorial	Tula	Russia	IAAF Grand Prix II
13	10 June	Cena Slovenska - Slovak Gold	Bratislava	Slovakia	IAAF Grand Prix II
14	15 June	Lille Metropole Meeting	Villeneuve-d'Ascq	France	IAAF Grand Prix I
15	12 June	Golden Spike Ostrava	Ostrava	Czech Republic	IAAF Super Grand Prix
16	24 June	Super Grand Prix Tsiklitiria	Trikala	Greece	IAAF Super Grand Prix
17	27 June	Bislett Games	Oslo	Norway	2003 IAAF Golden League
18	29 June	Memorial Josefa Odlozila	Prague	Czech Republic	IAAF Grand Prix II
19	1 July	Athletissima	Lausanne	Switzerland	IAAF Super Grand Prix
20	4 July	Meeting de Paris	Paris	France	2003 IAAF Golden League
21	7 July	Grand Prix Zagreb	Zagreb	Croatia	IAAF Grand Prix I
22	11 July	Golden Gala	Rome	Italy	2003 IAAF Golden League
23	13 July	Norwich Union Classic	Gateshead	United Kingdom	IAAF Super Grand Prix
24	19 July	Meeting de Madrid	Madrid	Spain	IAAF Super Grand Prix
25	31 July	Intersport Gugl-Meeting	Linz	Austria	IAAF Grand Prix I
26	2 August	KBC Night of Athletics	Heusden-Zolder	Belgium	IAAF Grand Prix II
27	3 August	International Meeting Thessaloníki	Thessaloniki	Greece	IAAF Grand Prix II
28	5 August	DN Galan	Stockholm	Sweden	IAAF Super Grand Prix
29	8 August	Norwich Union British Grand Prix	London	United Kingdom	IAAF Super Grand Prix
30	10 August	ISTAF Berlin	Berlin	Germany	2003 IAAF Golden League
31	15 August	Weltklasse Zürich	Zürich	Switzerland	2003 IAAF Golden League
32	18 August	Asics GP Helsinki	Helsinki	Finland	IAAF Grand Prix I
33	5 September	Memorial Van Damme	Brussels	Belgium	2003 IAAF Golden League
34	7 September	Rieti Meeting	Rieti	Italy	IAAF Grand Prix I
F	13–14 September	2003 IAAF World Athletics Final	Fontvieille	Monaco	IAAF World Athletics Final
