= IAAF Grand Prix II =

Series of track and field competitions

- Sport: Track and field
- Founded: 1994
- Ceased: 2005
- Continent: Global

The IAAF Grand Prix II was an annual series of one-day track and field competitions organized by the International Association of Athletics Federations (IAAF). It was introduced in 1994 as an expansion of the IAAF Grand Prix series, adding a second category of competitions in order to support a greater number of meetings with the financial benefit of being an official Grand Prix meeting. Prior to its creation, meetings not on the Grand Prix list were included as IAAF Permit Meetings. Further additions to the Grand Prix II level required a competition to have held permit status for two years. Over the competition's history, at least 24 different meetings were part of the circuit.

Athletes earned points at the meetings, dependent upon their finishing position, and the overall points leaders from the wider circuit gained entry to the annual IAAF Grand Prix Final in 1994 to 2002, then the IAAF World Athletics Final from 2003 to 2005.

The role of the Grand Prix II category changed over the years, starting as the second tier of the IAAF Grand Prix before changing to the third tier with the introduction of the IAAF Golden League in 1998. The creation of the IAAF World Outdoor Meetings tour in 2003 reorganised the IAAF's one-day circuit into four tiers, with the IAAF Super Grand Prix becoming the second most prestigious grouping and the IAAF Grand Prix II as the fourth and lowest level. The category was made defunct in 2006, when the IAAF World Athletics Tour was created.

== Editions ==
The IAAF Grand Prix II calendar was subject to change during its lifetime, with the number of meetings, the constituent meetings, and the duration of the series all regularly changing from year to year.

Key: As part of IAAF World Outdoor Meetings

Edition	Year	Start date	End date	Meets	Final	Final date	Ref.
1	1994	1 June	28 August	8	1994 IAAF Grand Prix Final	3 September	
2	1995	30 May	5 September	9	1995 IAAF Grand Prix Final	9 September	
3	1996	19 February	1 September	12	1996 IAAF Grand Prix Final	7 September	
4	1997	20 February	7 September	10	1997 IAAF Grand Prix Final	13 September	
5	1998	25 February	30 August	11	1998 IAAF Grand Prix Final	5 September	
6	1999	25 February	5 September	11	1999 IAAF Grand Prix Final	11 September	
7	2000	2 March	3 September	10	2000 IAAF Grand Prix Final	5 October	
8	2001	1 March	2 September	11	2001 IAAF Grand Prix Final	9 September	
9	2002	7 March	8 September	11	2002 IAAF Grand Prix Final	14 September	
10	2003	1 March	3 August	11	2003 IAAF World Athletics Final	13–14 September	
11	2004	12 February	31 July	11	2004 IAAF World Athletics Final	18–19 September	
12	2005	17 February	23 July	10	2005 IAAF World Athletics Final	9–10 September	

== Meetings ==
#	Meeting	City	Country	1994	1995	1996	1997	1998	1999	2000	2001	2002	2003	2004	2005
1	British Grand Prix	Gateshead	United Kingdom	GP2	GP2	GP2	GP2	GP2	GP2	GP2	GP2	GP2	-	-	-
2	FBK Games	Hengelo	Netherlands	GP2	GP2	GP2	GP2	GP2	GP2	GP2	GP2	GP2	-	-	-
3	Rieti Meeting	Rieti	Italy	GP2	GP2	GP2	GP2	GP2	GP2	GP2	GP2	GP2	-	-	-
4	Helsinki Grand Prix	Helsinki	Finland	GP2	GP2	GP2	GP2	GP2	GP2	GP2	GP2	GP2	-	-	-
5	Gran Premio Diputación	Seville	Spain	GP2	GP2	GP2	GP2	GP2	GP2	GP2	GP2	GP2	-	-	-
6	Gugl Grand Prix	Linz	Austria	GP2	GP2	GP2	GP2	GP2	GP2	GP2	GP2	GP2	-	-	-
7	Cena Slovenska - Slovak Gold	Bratislava	Slovakia	GP2	GP2	GP2	GP2	GP2	GP2	GP2	GP2	GP2	GP2	-	-
8	Meeting de L'Humanité	St. Denis	France	GP2	GP2	GP2	GP2	GP2	GP2	-	-	-	-	-	-
9	Melbourne Track Classic	Melbourne	Australia	-	-	GP2	GP2	GP2	GP2	GP2	GP2	GP2	GP2	GP2	GP2
10	Engen Grand Prix	Johannesburg	South Africa	-	-	GP2		GP2					-	-	-
10	Engen Grand Prix	Pretoria	South Africa	-	-		GP2			GP2	GP2	GP2	-	-	-
10	Engen Grand Prix	Roodepoort	South Africa	-	-				GP2				-	-	-
11	Bruce Jenner Classic	San Jose	United States	-	-	GP2	-	-	-	-	-	-	-	-	-
12	Qatar Athletic Super Grand Prix	Doha	Qatar	-	-	-	-	GP2	-	-	-	-	-	-	-
13	Athens Grand Prix Tsiklitiria	Athens	Greece	-	-	-	-	-	GP2	-	-	-	-	-	-
14	Hanžeković Memorial	Zagreb	Croatia	-	-	-	-	-	-	GP2	GP2	GP2	-	-	-
15	Adidas Oregon Track Classic	Portland	United States	-	-	-	-	-	-	-	GP2	GP2		GP2	-
15	Adidas Oregon Track Classic	Gresham	United States	-	-	-	-	-	-	-			GP2		-
16	Brothers Znamensky Memorial	Moscow	Russia	-	GP2	-	-	-	-	-	-	-			
16	Brothers Znamensky Memorial	Tula	Russia	-		-	-	-	-	-	-	-	GP2		
16	Brothers Znamensky Memorial	Kazan	Russia	-		-	-	-	-	-	-	-		GP2	GP2
17	International Meeting Thessaloniki	Thessaloniki	Greece	-	-	-	-	-	-	-	-	-	GP2	GP2	GP2
18	Palo Alto Meeting	Palo Alto	United States	-	-	-	-	-	-	-	-	-	GP2	GP2	GP2
19	Meeting du Conseil Général de la Martinique	Fort-de-France	France	-	-	-	-	-	-	-	-	-	GP2	GP2	GP2
20	Notturna di Milano	Milan	Italy	-	-	-	-	-	-	-	-	-	GP2	GP2	GP2
21	Memorial Primo Nebiolo	Turin	Italy	-	-	-	-	-	-	-	-	-	GP2	GP2	GP2
22	Josef Odložil Memorial	Prague	Czech Republic	-	-	-	-	-	-	-	-	-	GP2	GP2	GP2
23	KBC Night of Athletics	Heusden-Zolder	Belgium	-	-	-	-	-	-	-	-	-	GP2	GP2	GP2
24	Grande Premio Rio de Atletismo	Rio de Janeiro	Brazil	-	-	-	-	-	-	-	-	-	-	GP2	GP2

- The South African meet was called All Africa Invitational in 1996–1998
