= 2007 IAAF World Athletics Tour =

- Edition: 2nd
- Start date: 2 March 2007
- End date: 16 September 2007
- Meetings: 24 (+1 final)

The 2007 IAAF World Athletics Tour was the second edition of the annual global circuit of one-day track and field competitions organized by the International Association of Athletics Federations (IAAF). The series featured 24 one-day meetings, consisting of the six meetings of the 2007 IAAF Golden League, five IAAF Super Grand Prix meetings, and thirteen IAAF Grand Prix meetings. In addition, there were 27 Area Permit Meetings that carried point-scoring events. The series culminated in the two-day 2007 IAAF World Athletics Final, held in Stuttgart, Germany from 22–23 September.

Four athletes achieved 100 points in the rankings in their event, all of them women: Sanya Richards (400 m), Maryam Yusuf Jamal (1500 m), Yelena Isinbayeva (pole vault) and Blanka Vlašić (high jump). The highest scoring male athlete was Asafa Powell in the 100 metres with 96 points – a total also reached by two athletes in the women's 100 metres hurdles (Susanna Kallur and Michelle Perry).

== Schedule ==
Number	Date	Meet	City	Country	Level	Events (M+W)
–	27 January	Canberra Athletics Grand Prix	Canberra	Australia	Oceania Area Permit Meeting	
–	17 February	Sydney Track Classic	Sydney	Australia	Oceania Area Permit Meeting	
–	22 February	New Zealand Grand Prix	Christchurch	New Zealand	Oceania Area Permit Meeting	
1	2 March	Melbourne Track Classic	Melbourne	Australia	2007 IAAF Grand Prix	
2	28 April	Meeting Grand Prix IAAF de Dakar	Dakar	Senegal	2007 IAAF Grand Prix	
3	5 May	Osaka Grand Prix	Osaka	Japan	2007 IAAF Grand Prix	
–	5 May	Abuja CAA Super Grand Prix	Abuja	Nigeria	CAA Area Permit Meeting	
–	5 May	Jamaica International Invitational	Kingston	Jamaica	NACAC Area Permit Meeting	
–	6 May	Gold Meeting Sesi Caixa	Uberlândia	Brazil	CONSUDATLE Area Permit Meeting	
4	11 May	Qatar Athletic Super Grand Prix	Doha	Qatar	2007 IAAF Super Grand Prix	
–	13 May	Gold Meeting Rio de Atletismo	Rio de Janeiro	Brazil	CONSUDATLE Area Permit Meeting	
–	16 May	Gold Meeting Caixa Fortaleza	Fortaleza	Brazil	CONSUDATLE Area Permit Meeting	
–	19 May	Grand Premio Andalucía	Herrera	Spain	EAA Area Permit Meeting	
–	20 May	Adidas Track Classic	Carson	United States	NACAC Area Permit Meeting	
5	20 May	Grande Premio Brasil Caixa de Atletismo	Belém	Brazil	2007 IAAF Grand Prix	
6	26 May	Fanny Blankers-Koen Games	Hengelo	Netherlands	2007 IAAF Grand Prix	
7	2 June	Reebok Grand Prix	New York City	United States	2007 IAAF Grand Prix	
–	8 June	Meeting Lille Metropole	Villeneuve-d'Ascq	France	EAA Area Permit Meeting	
–	8 June	Memorial Primo Nebiolo	Turin	Italy	EAA Area Permit Meeting	
8	10 June	Prefontaine Classic	Eugene	United States	2007 IAAF Grand Prix	
–	10 June	European Athletics Festival	Bydgoszcz	Poland	EAA Area Permit Meeting	
–	13 June	Memorial Josefa Odlozila	Prague	Czech Republic	EAA Area Permit Meeting	
9	15 June	Bislett Games	Oslo	Norway	2007 IAAF Golden League	
–	17 June	Janusz Kusocinski Memorial	Warsaw	Poland	EAA Area Permit Meeting	
–	19 June	Asian AA Grand Prix	Bangkok	Thailand	AAA Area Permit Meeting	
–	21 June	Alger CAA Super Grand Prix	Algiers	Algeria	CAA Area Permit Meeting	
–	23 June	Asian AA Grand Prix	Guwahati	India	AAA Area Permit Meeting	
10	27 June	Golden Spike Ostrava	Ostrava	Czech Republic	2007 IAAF Grand Prix	
–	27 June	Asian AA Grand Prix	Pune	India	AAA Area Permit Meeting	
–	28 June	Spitzen Leichathletik	Lucerne	Switzerland	EAA Area Permit Meeting	
11	2 July	Athens Grand Prix Tsiklitiria	Athens	Greece	2007 IAAF Grand Prix	
12	4 July	Hanžeković Memorial	Zagreb	Croatia	2007 IAAF Grand Prix	
13	6 July	Meeting Areva	Paris Saint-Denis	France	2007 IAAF Golden League	
14	10 July	Athletissima	Lausanne	Switzerland	2007 IAAF Super Grand Prix	
15	13 July	Golden Gala	Rome	Italy	2007 IAAF Golden League	
16	15 July	British Grand Prix	Sheffield	United Kingdom	2007 IAAF Grand Prix	
–	18 July	Vardinoyiannia	Rethymno	Greece	EAA Area Permit Meeting	
17	21 July	Meeting de Atletismo Madrid	Madrid	Spain	2007 IAAF Grand Prix	
–	22 July	Tallinn Meeting	Tallinn	Estonia	EAA Area Permit Meeting	
18	25 July	Herculis	Monte Carlo	Monaco	2007 IAAF Super Grand Prix	
–	28 July	Gobierno de Aragón	Zaragoza	Spain	EAA Area Permit Meeting	
–	28 July	KBC Night of Athletics	Heusden-Zolder	Belgium	EAA Area Permit Meeting	
–	30 July	Olympic Meeting Thessaloniki	Thessaloniki	Greece	EAA Area Permit Meeting	
19	3 August	London Grand Prix	London	United Kingdom	2007 IAAF Super Grand Prix	
20	7 August	DN Galan	Stockholm	Sweden	2007 IAAF Super Grand Prix	
21	7 September	Weltklasse Zürich	Zürich	Switzerland	2007 IAAF Golden League	
22	9 September	Rieti Meeting	Rieti	Italy	2007 IAAF Grand Prix	
–	11 September	Gugl-Meeting	Linz	Austria	EAA Area Permit Meeting	
–	12 September	Palio Città della Quercia	Rovereto	Italy	EAA Area Permit Meeting	
23	14 September	Memorial Van Damme	Brussels	Belgium	2007 IAAF Golden League	
24	16 September	ISTAF Berlin	Berlin	Germany	2007 IAAF Golden League	
F	22–23 September	2007 IAAF World Athletics Final	Stuttgart	Germany	IAAF World Athletics Final	

== Points standings ==
Athletes earned points at meetings during the series. The following athletes were the top performers for their event prior to the World Athletics Final.

Event	Male athlete	Points	Female athlete	Points
100 metres	Asafa Powell (JAM)	96	Torri Edwards (USA)	90
200 metres	Wallace Spearmon (USA)	80	Kim Gevaert (BEL)	54
400 metres	LaShawn Merritt (USA)	86	Sanya Richards (USA)	100
800 metres	Mbulaeni Mulaudzi (RSA)	76	Janeth Jepkosgei (KEN)	72
1500 metres	Daniel Kipchirchir Komen (KEN)	76	Maryam Yusuf Jamal (BHR)	100
3000 metres	Moses Ndiema Kipsiro (UGA); Kenenisa Bekele (ETH)	50	Priscah Jepleting Cherono (KEN) Jo Pavey (GBR) Jéssica Augusto (POR)	24
5000 metres	Sileshi Sihine (ETH)	50	Kim Smith (NZL)	44
100/110 metres hurdles	Anwar Moore (USA)	88	Susanna Kallur (SWE) Michelle Perry (USA)	96
400 metres hurdles	James Carter (USA)	80	Jana Rawlinson (AUS)	76
3000 metres steeplechase	Paul Kipsiele Koech (KEN)	76	Korene Hinds (JAM)	47
Pole vault	Brad Walker (USA)	66	Yelena Isinbayeva (RUS)	100
High jump	Stefan Holm (SWE)	68	Blanka Vlašić (CRO)	100
Long jump	Brian Johnson (USA) Irving Saladino (PAN)	60	Kumiko Ikeda (JPN)	56
Triple jump	Aarik Wilson (USA)	86	Tatyana Lebedeva (RUS)	64
Shot put	Reese Hoffa (USA)	60	Li Ling (CHN)	18
Discus throw	Virgilijus Alekna (LTU)	60	Beatrice Faumuina (NZL) Franka Dietzsch (GER)	22
Javelin throw	Tero Pitkämäki (FIN) Andreas Thorkildsen (NOR)	80	Barbora Špotáková (CZE) Christina Obergföll (GER)	50
Hammer throw	Ivan Tsikhan (BLR)	26	Kamila Skolimowska (POL)	39
