= 2008 IAAF World Athletics Tour =

- Edition: 3rd
- Start date: 28 September 2007
- End date: 10 September 2008
- Meetings: 25 (+1 final)

The 2008 IAAF World Athletics Tour was the third edition of the annual global circuit of one-day track and field competitions organized by the International Association of Athletics Federations (IAAF). The series featured 25 one-day meetings, consisting of the six meetings of the 2008 IAAF Golden League, five IAAF Super Grand Prix meetings, and fourteen IAAF Grand Prix meetings. In addition, there were 29 Area Permit Meetings that carried point-scoring events. The series culminated in the two-day 2008 IAAF World Athletics Final, held in Stuttgart, Germany from 13 to 14 September.

Russian pole vaulter Yelena Isinbayeva scored the most points during the circuit, with a total of 112. Cuban hurdler Dayron Robles was the highest scoring male athlete with 102 points. Four other athletes achieved a total of 100 points: sprinter Jeremy Wariner, middle-distance runner Pamela Jelimo, hurdler David Oliver, and high jumper Blanka Vlašić.

== Schedule ==
Number	Date	Meet	City	Country	Level	Events (M+W)
1	28 September 2007	Shanghai Golden Grand Prix	Shanghai	China	2008 IAAF Grand Prix	
–	26–27 January	Canberra Athletics Grand Prix	Canberra	Australia	Oceania Area Permit Meeting	
–	16 February	Sydney Track Classic	Sydney	Australia	Oceania Area Permit Meeting	
–	19 February	New Zealand Permit Meeting	Waitakere City	New Zealand	Oceania Area Permit Meeting	
2	21 February	Melbourne Track Classic	Melbourne	Australia	2008 IAAF Grand Prix	
–	3 May	Jamaica International Invitational	Kingston	Jamaica	NACAC Area Permit Meeting	
3	9 May	Qatar Athletic Super Grand Prix	Doha	Qatar	2008 IAAF Super Grand Prix	
4	10 May	Osaka Grand Prix	Osaka	Japan	2008 IAAF Grand Prix	
–	11 May	Gold Meeting Sesi Caixa	Uberlândia	Brazil	CONSUDATLE Area Permit Meeting	
–	14 May	Gold Meeting Caixa Fortaleza	Fortaleza	Brazil	CONSUDATLE Area Permit Meeting	
–	17 May	Ponce Grand Prix	Ponce	Puerto Rico	NACAC Area Permit Meeting	
5	17 May	Meeting Grand Prix IAAF de Dakar	Dakar	Senegal	2008 IAAF Grand Prix	
–	18 May	Adidas Track Classic	Carson	United States	NACAC Area Permit Meeting	
–	18 May	Gold Meeting Rio de Atletismo	Rio de Janeiro	Brazil	CONSUDATLE Area Permit Meeting	
6	24 May	Fanny Blankers-Koen Games	Hengelo	Netherlands	2008 IAAF Grand Prix	
7	25 May	Grande Premio Brasil Caixa de Atletismo	Belém	Brazil	2008 IAAF Grand Prix	
–	29 May	Alger CAA Super Grand Prix	Algiers	Algeria	CAA Area Permit Meeting	
–	31 May	Gobierno de Aragón	Zaragoza	Spain	EAA Area Permit Meeting	
8	31 May	Reebok Grand Prix	New York City	United States	2008 IAAF Grand Prix	
–	1 June	Brazzaville CAA Super Grand Prix	Brazzaville	Republic of the Congo	CAA Area Permit Meeting	
9	1 June	ISTAF Berlin	Berlin	Germany	2008 IAAF Golden League	
–	3 June	Tallinn Meeting	Tallinn	Estonia	EAA Area Permit Meeting	
–	6 June	Memorial Primo Nebiolo	Turin	Italy	EAA Area Permit Meeting	
10	6 June	Bislett Games	Oslo	Norway	2008 IAAF Golden League	
11	8 June	Prefontaine Classic	Eugene	United States	2008 IAAF Grand Prix	
12	12 June	Golden Spike Ostrava	Ostrava	Czech Republic	2008 IAAF Grand Prix	
–	15 June	Janusz Kusocinski Memorial	Warsaw	Poland	EAA Area Permit Meeting	
–	15 June	Znamensky Memorial	Zhukovsky	Russia	EAA Area Permit Meeting	
–	16 June	Memorial Josefa Odlozila	Prague	Czech Republic	EAA Area Permit Meeting	
–	23 June	Abuja CAA Super Grand Prix	Abuja	Nigeria	CAA Area Permit Meeting	
–	23 June	Asian AA Grand Prix	Bangkok	Thailand	AAA Area Permit Meeting	
–	24 June	Meeting de Atletismo Jerez	Jerez de la Frontera	Spain	EAA Area Permit Meeting	
–	26 June	Asian AA Grand Prix	Korat	Thailand	AAA Area Permit Meeting	
–	27 June	Meeting Lille Metropole	Villeneuve-d'Ascq	France	EAA Area Permit Meeting	
–	30 June	Asian AA Grand Prix	Hanoi	Vietnam	AAA Area Permit Meeting	
–	1 July	European Athletics Festival	Bydgoszcz	Poland	EAA Area Permit Meeting	
13	5 July	Meeting de Atletismo Madrid	Madrid	Spain	2008 IAAF Grand Prix	
–	9 July	Olympic Meeting Thessaloniki	Thessaloniki	Greece	EAA Area Permit Meeting	
14	11 July	Golden Gala	Rome	Italy	2008 IAAF Golden League	
15	13 July	Athens Grand Prix Tsiklitiria	Athens	Greece	2008 IAAF Grand Prix	
–	14 July	Vardinoyiannia	Rethymno	Greece	EAA Area Permit Meeting	
–	16 July	Spitzen Leichathletik	Lucerne	Switzerland	EAA Area Permit Meeting	
16	18 July	Meeting Areva	Paris Saint-Denis	France	2008 IAAF Golden League	
–	20 July	KBC Night of Athletics	Heusden-Zolder	Belgium	EAA Area Permit Meeting	
17	22 July	DN Galan	Stockholm	Sweden	2008 IAAF Super Grand Prix	
18	25–26 July	London Grand Prix	London	United Kingdom	2008 IAAF Super Grand Prix	
19	29 July	Herculis	Monte Carlo	Monaco	2008 IAAF Super Grand Prix	
20	29 August	Weltklasse Zürich	Zürich	Switzerland	2008 IAAF Golden League	
21	31 August	British Grand Prix	Gateshead	United Kingdom	2008 IAAF Grand Prix	
22	2 September	Athletissima	Lausanne	Switzerland	2008 IAAF Super Grand Prix	
23	5 September	Memorial Van Damme	Brussels	Belgium	2008 IAAF Golden League	
24	7 September	Rieti Meeting	Rieti	Italy	2008 IAAF Grand Prix	
25	9 September	Hanžeković Memorial	Zagreb	Croatia	2008 IAAF Grand Prix	
–	10 September	Palio Città della Quercia	Rovereto	Italy	EAA Area Permit Meeting	
F	13–14 September	2008 IAAF World Athletics Final	Stuttgart	Germany	IAAF World Athletics Final	

== Points standings ==
Athletes earned points at meetings during the series. The following athletes were the top performers for their event prior to the World Athletics Final.

Event	Male athlete	Points	Female athlete	Points
100 metres	Asafa Powell (JAM)	96	Shelly-Ann Fraser (JAM)	61
200 metres	Usain Bolt (JAM)	60	Debbie Ferguson-McKenzie (BAH)	58
400 metres	Jeremy Wariner (USA)	100	Novlene Williams (JAM)	74
800 metres	Abraham Chepkirwok (UGA)	80	Pamela Jelimo (KEN)	100
1500 metres	Abdalaati Iguider (MAR) Daniel Kipchirchir Komen (KEN)	72	Maryam Yusuf Jamal (BHR)	58
3000 metres	Isaac Kiprono Songok (KEN)	48	Jennifer Rhines (USA)	30
5000 metres	Moses Ndiema Masai (KEN) Sileshi Sihine (ETH)	50	Tirunesh Dibaba (ETH)	66
100/110 metres hurdles	Dayron Robles (CUB)	102	Delloreen Ennis-London (JAM)	90
400 metres hurdles	Kerron Clement (USA)	96	Melaine Walker (JAM)	90
3000 metres steeplechase	Michael Kipyego (KEN)	76	Donna MacFarlane (AUS)	49
Pole vault	Yevgeny Lukyanenko (USA)	76	Yelena Isinbayeva (RUS)	112
High jump	Andrey Silnov (RUS)	78	Blanka Vlašić (CRO)	100
Long jump	Hussein Al-Sabee (KSA)	92	Naide Gomes (POR)	68
Triple jump	Randy Lewis (GRN)	70	Yargelis Savigne (CUB)	22
Shot put	Tomasz Majewski (POL)	60	Li Ling (CHN)	37
Discus throw	Ehsan Haddadi (IRI)	60	Li Yanfeng (CHN) Sun Taifeng (CHN)	30
Javelin throw	Andreas Thorkildsen (NOR)	80	Christina Obergföll (GER)	51
Hammer throw	Krisztián Pars (HUN)	40	Kamila Skolimowska (POL)	42
