= IAAF World Athletics Tour =

Annual series of athletics competitions

- Sport: Track and field
- Founded: 2006
- Ceased: 2009
- Qualification: for World Athletics Final
- Official website: IAAF Official website

The IAAF World Athletics Tour was an annual global circuit of one day track and field competitions organized by the International Association of Athletics Federations (IAAF). Formed in 2006, it comprised two separate levels of athletics meetings: the first level being the IAAF Golden League and IAAF Super Grand Prix events, and the second comprising IAAF Grand Prix events and area permit meetings. It replaced the IAAF World Outdoor Meetings series, which had only started three years earlier, and rendered the IAAF Grand Prix II series defunct.

The tour featured twenty-five of the world's premier athletics meetings comprising: six Golden League meetings, five Super Grand Prix meetings and fourteen Grand Prix meetings. There were also 25 or more area permit meetings every year which were run by one of the six continental athletics associations, and featured some point-scoring events. Athletes collected points at the meetings, dependent upon their finishing position, and the overall points leaders gained entry to the annual World Athletics Final.

From 2010 onwards the World Athletics Tour is replaced by the IAAF Diamond League and IAAF World Challenge Meetings. In 2020, the World Challenge was replaced by the World Athletics Continental Tour.

== Editions ==
The IAAF World Athletics Tour calendar was subject to change during its lifetime, with the number of meetings, the constituent meetings, and the duration of the series all regularly changing from year to year. Athletes received points based on their performances at the meetings on the circuit, with more points being given at the more prestigious and competitive competitions.

From 2006 to 2009, series points could also be scored in certain events at Area Permit Meetings (APMs), although the meetings themselves were not considered a formal part of the series. Area permit meetings were divided by continent as follows: Asian Grand Prix (Asia), CAA Grand Prix Series (Africa), EAA Outdoor Meetings (Europe), Oceania Area Permit Meetings (Oceania), NACAC Area Permit Meetings (North America), and Grand Prix Sudamericano (South America).

A total of five meeting categories existed over the lifetime of the circuit:

- GL : IAAF Golden League
- SGP : IAAF Super Grand Prix
- GP : IAAF Grand Prix
- WAF : IAAF World Athletics Final
- APM : Area Permit Meeting

Edition	Year	Start date	End date	Meets	GL	SGP	GP	APM	Final	Final date	Ref.
1	2006	9 March	3 September	24	6	6	12	25	2006 IAAF World Athletics Final	9–10 September	
2	2007	2 March	16 September	24	6	5	13	27	2007 IAAF World Athletics Final	22–23 September	
3	2008	28 September 2007	9 September 2008	25	6	5	14	29	2008 IAAF World Athletics Final	13–14 September	
4	2009	20 September 2008	6 September 2009	25	6	5	14	29	2009 IAAF World Athletics Final	12–13 September	

== Points system ==
Athletes earned points in each event at the designated IAAF World Athletics Tour meetings. Winning athletes at Grand Prix level meetings earned ten points, while runners-up earned between one and eight points dependent on their finishing position. The Golden League and Super Grand Prix meets were worth twice as many points. Furthermore, athletes may earned additional points at certain area permit meetings.

The athletes with the most points at the end of the season's World Athletics Tour were entered to compete at the World Athletics Final, an event which offers athletes the possibility of substantial earnings.

== Meetings ==
The IAAF World Athletics Tour calendar was subject to change during its lifetime, with the number of meetings, the constituent meetings and the duration of the series all regularly changing from year to year. Athletes received points based on their performances at the meetings on the circuit, with more points being given at the more prestigious and competitive competitions.

#	Meeting	City	Country	2006	2007	2008	2009
1	ISTAF Berlin	Berlin	Germany	GL	GL	GL	GL
2	Bislett Games	Oslo	Norway	GL	GL	GL	GL
3	Golden Gala	Rome	Italy	GL	GL	GL	GL
4	Weltklasse Zürich	Zürich	Switzerland	GL	GL	GL	GL
5	Memorial Van Damme	Brussels	Belgium	GL	GL	GL	GL
6	Meeting Areva	Saint-Denis	France	GL	GL	GL	GL
7	Herculis	Monte Carlo	Monaco	SGP	SGP	SGP	SGP
8	Athletissima	Lausanne	Switzerland	SGP	SGP	SGP	SGP
9	London Grand Prix	London	United Kingdom	SGP	SGP	SGP	SGP
10	DN Galan	Stockholm	Sweden	SGP	SGP	SGP	SGP
11	Qatar Athletic Super Grand Prix	Doha	Qatar	SGP	SGP	SGP	SGP
12	British Grand Prix	Gateshead	United Kingdom	GP	GP	GP	GP
13	Athens Grand Prix Tsiklitiria	Athens	Greece	GP	GP	GP	GP
14	Golden Spike Ostrava	Ostrava	Czech Republic	GP	GP	GP	GP
15	Meeting de Atletismo Madrid	Madrid	Spain	GP	GP	GP	GP
16	Prefontaine Classic	Eugene	United States	GP	GP	GP	GP
17	Osaka Grand Prix	Osaka	Japan	GP	GP	GP	GP
18	Grande Premio Brasil Caixa de Atletismo	Rio de Janeiro	Brazil	GP	GP	GP	GP
19	Melbourne Track Classic	Melbourne	Australia	GP	GP	GP	GP
20	FBK Games	Hengelo	Netherlands	GP	GP	GP	GP
21	Rieti Meeting	Rieti	Italy	GP	GP	GP	GP
22	Hanžeković Memorial	Zagreb	Croatia	GP	GP	GP	GP
23	Meeting Grand Prix IAAF de Dakar	Dakar	Senegal	GP	GP	GP	GP
24	Adidas Grand Prix	New York City	United States	APM	GP	GP	GP
25	Shanghai Golden Grand Prix	Shanghai	China	†	GP	GP	GP
26	Helsinki Grand Prix	Helsinki	Finland	GP	-	-	-
27	Gugl Grand Prix	Linz	Austria	APM	APM	-	-
28	Brothers Znamensky Memorial	Zhukovsky	Russia	APM	-	APM	APM
29	International Meeting Thessaloniki	Thessaloniki	Greece	APM	APM	APM	APM
30	Memorial Primo Nebiolo	Turin	Italy	APM	APM	APM	APM
31	Meeting Lille-Métropole	Villeneuve-d'Ascq	France	APM	APM	APM	APM
32	Josef Odložil Memorial	Prague	Czech Republic	APM	APM	APM	APM
33	KBC Night of Athletics	Heusden-Zolder	Belgium	APM	APM	APM	APM
34	Grande Premio Rio de Atletismo	Rio de Janeiro	Brazil	APM	APM	APM	APM
35	IAAF World Athletics Final	Stuttgart	Germany	WAF	WAF	WAF	WAF
–	Telstra A-series Brisbane	Brisbane	Australia	APM	-	-	-
–	CAA Grand Prix d'Abuja	Abuja	Nigeria	APM	APM	APM	APM
–	Jamaica International Invitational	Kingston	Jamaica	APM	APM	APM	APM
–	GP Sul-Americano de Porto Alegre	Porto Alegre	Brazil	APM	-	-	-
–	GP Sud-Americano CAIXA de Atletismo	Fortaleza	Brazil	APM	APM	APM	APM
–	Adidas Track Classic	Carson	United States	APM	APM	APM	APM
–	European Athletics Festival Bydgoszcz	Bydgoszcz	Poland	APM	APM	APM	APM
–	Reunión Internacional Gobierno de Aragon	Zaragoza	Spain	APM	APM	APM	APM
–	Maroc Telecom Rabat International	Rabat	Morocco	APM	-	-	APM
–	Janusz Kusociński Memorial	Warsaw	Poland	APM	APM	APM	APM
–	Meeting Atletismo Huelva	Huelva	Spain	APM	-	-	-
–	CAA Grand Prix d'Alger	Algiers	Algeria	APM	APM	APM	APM
–	Spitzen Leichtathletik Luzern	Lucerne	Switzerland	APM	APM	APM	APM
–	Vardinoyiannia	Rethymno	Greece	APM	APM	APM	APM
–	Tallinn Meeting	Tallinn	Estonia	APM	APM	APM	APM
–	Palio Città della Quercia	Rovereto	Italy	APM	APM	APM	APM
–	Telstra A-series Grand Prix - Canberra	Canberra	Australia	-	APM	APM	-
–	Telstra A-series Grand Prix - Sydney	Sydney	Australia	-	APM	APM	APM
–	New Zealand Grand Prix - Christchurch	Christchurch	New Zealand	-	APM	-	-
–	Gold Meeting Sesi Caixa	Uberlândia	Brazil	-	APM	APM	APM
–	Grand Premio Andalucía	Herrera	Spain	-	APM	-	-
–	Asian Grand Prix - Bangkok	Bangkok	Thailand	-	APM	APM	-
–	Asian Grand Prix - Guwahati	Guwahati	India	-	APM	-	-
–	Asian Grand Prix - Pune	Pune	India	-	APM	-	-
–	New Zealand Permit Meeting	Waitakere City	New Zealand	-	-	APM	APM
–	Ponce Grand Prix de Atletismo	Ponce	Puerto Rico	-	-	APM	APM
–	Brazzaville CAA Super Grand Prix	Brazzaville	Republic of the Congo	-	-	APM	-
–	Meeting de Atletismo Jerez	Jerez de la Frontera	Spain	-	-	APM	-
–	Asian Grand Prix - Korat	Nakhon Ratchasima	Thailand	-	-	APM	-
–	Asian Grand Prix - Hanoi	Hanoi	Vietnam	-	-	APM	-
–	Asian AA Grand Prix - Suzhou	Suzhou	China	-	-	-	APM
–	Asian AA Grand Prix - Kunshan	Kunshan	China	-	-	-	APM
–	Asian AA Grand Prix - Hong Kong	Hong Kong	China	-	-	-	APM
–	Meeting de Atletismo Málaga	Málaga	Spain	-	-	-	APM
–	Moscow Open	Moscow	Russia	-	-	-	APM

- The 2009 IAAF World Athletics Final was held in Thessaloniki, though it did not replace the annual meeting there
- † The 2006 Shanghai Golden Grand Prix was given IAAF Permit Meeting status for that year (the only meet with that designation) due to it being held after the World Athletics Final.
