= 2009 IAAF World Athletics Tour =

- Countries that hosted series meetings in 2009 Golden League meetings Super Grand Prix meetings Grand Prix meetings
- Edition: 4th
- Start date: 20 September 2008
- End date: 6 September 2009
- Meetings: 25 (+1 final)

The 2009 IAAF World Athletics Tour was the fourth and final edition of the annual global circuit of one-day track and field competitions organized by the International Association of Athletics Federations (IAAF). The series featured 25 one-day meetings, consisting of the six meetings of the 2009 IAAF Golden League, five IAAF Super Grand Prix meetings, and fourteen IAAF Grand Prix meetings. In addition, there were 29 Area Permit Meetings that carried point-scoring events. The series culminated in the two-day 2009 IAAF World Athletics Final, held in Thessaloniki, Greece from 12–13 September.

Russian pole vaulter Yelena Isinbayeva scored the most points during the circuit, with a total of 106. Five other athletes achieved a total of 100 points: distance runner Kenenisa Bekele, hurdler Dayron Robles, sprinters Kerron Stewart and Sanya Richards, and high jumper Blanka Vlašić.

== Schedule ==
Number	Date	Meet	City	Country	Level	Events (M+W)
1	20 September 2008	Shanghai Golden Grand Prix	Shanghai	China	2009 IAAF Grand Prix	
–	20 February	New Zealand Permit Meeting	Waitakere City	New Zealand	Oceania Area Permit Meeting	
–	28 February	Sydney Track Classic	Sydney	Australia	Oceania Area Permit Meeting	
2	5 March	Melbourne Track Classic	Melbourne	Australia	2009 IAAF Grand Prix	
3	18 April	Meeting Grand Prix IAAF de Dakar	Dakar	Senegal	2009 IAAF Grand Prix	
–	2 May	Jamaica International Invitational	Kingston	Jamaica	NACAC Area Permit Meeting	
4	8 May	Qatar Athletic Super Grand Prix	Doha	Qatar	2009 IAAF Super Grand Prix	
5	9 May	Osaka Grand Prix	Osaka	Japan	2009 IAAF Grand Prix	
–	10 May	GP Caixa/Unifor de Atletismo	Fortaleza	Brazil	CONSUDATLE Area Permit Meeting	
–	16 May	Adidas Track Classic	Carson	United States	NACAC Area Permit Meeting	
–	16 May	Ponce Grand Prix	Ponce	Puerto Rico	NACAC Area Permit Meeting	
–	17 May	GP Rio Caixa de Atletismo	Rio de Janeiro	Brazil	CONSUDATLE Area Permit Meeting	
–	20 May	GP Caixa/Sesi de Atletismo	Uberlândia	Brazil	CONSUDATLE Area Permit Meeting	
–	23 May	Asian AA Grand Prix	Suzhou	China	AAA Area Permit Meeting	
–	23 May	Rabat CAA Super Grand Prix	Rabat	Morocco	CAA Area Permit Meeting	
6	24 May	Grande Premio Brasil Caixa de Atletismo	Belém	Brazil	2009 IAAF Grand Prix	
–	27 May	Asian AA Grand Prix	Kunshan	China	AAA Area Permit Meeting	
–	30 May	Asian AA Grand Prix	Hong Kong	China	AAA Area Permit Meeting	
7	30 May	Reebok Grand Prix	New York City	United States	2009 IAAF Grand Prix	
8	1 June	Fanny Blankers-Koen Games	Hengelo	Netherlands	2009 IAAF Grand Prix	
–	4 June	Memorial Primo Nebiolo	Turin	Italy	EAA Area Permit Meeting	
9	7 June	Prefontaine Classic	Eugene	United States	2009 IAAF Grand Prix	
–	7 June	Janusz Kusocinski Memorial	Warsaw	Poland	EAA Area Permit Meeting	
–	8 June	Memorial Josefa Odlozila	Prague	Czech Republic	EAA Area Permit Meeting	
–	10 June	European Athletics Festival	Bydgoszcz	Poland	EAA Area Permit Meeting	
–	10 June	Olympic Meeting Thessaloniki	Thessaloniki	Greece	EAA Area Permit Meeting	
–	11 June	Alger CAA Super Grand Prix	Algiers	Algeria	CAA Area Permit Meeting	
10	14 June	ISTAF Berlin	Berlin	Germany	2009 IAAF Golden League	
11	17 June	Golden Spike Ostrava	Ostrava	Czech Republic	2009 IAAF Grand Prix	
–	27 June	Meeting de Atletismo Málaga	Málaga	Spain	EAA Area Permit Meeting	
–	30 June	Meeting Lille Metropole	Villeneuve-d'Ascq	France	EAA Area Permit Meeting	
–	1 July	Moscow Open	Moscow	Russia	EAA Area Permit Meeting	
12	3 July	Bislett Games	Oslo	Norway	2009 IAAF Golden League	
13	4 July	Meeting de Atletismo Madrid	Madrid	Spain	2009 IAAF Grand Prix	
–	5 July	Znamensky Memorial	Zhukovsky	Russia	EAA Area Permit Meeting	
14	7 July	Athletissima	Lausanne	Switzerland	2009 IAAF Super Grand Prix	
15	10 July	Golden Gala	Rome	Italy	2009 IAAF Golden League	
16	13 July	Athens Grand Prix Tsiklitiria	Athens	Greece	2009 IAAF Grand Prix	
–	15 July	Spitzen Leichathletik	Lucerne	Switzerland	EAA Area Permit Meeting	
17	17 July	Meeting Areva	Paris Saint-Denis	France	2009 IAAF Golden League	
–	18 July	Abuja CAA Super Grand Prix	Abuja	Nigeria	CAA Area Permit Meeting	
–	18 July	Gobierno de Aragón	Zaragoza	Spain	EAA Area Permit Meeting	
–	18 July	KBC Night of Athletics	Heusden-Zolder	Belgium	EAA Area Permit Meeting	
–	20 July	Vardinoyiannia	Rethymno	Greece	EAA Area Permit Meeting	
18	24–25 July	London Grand Prix	London	United Kingdom	2009 IAAF Super Grand Prix	
19	28 July	Herculis	Monte Carlo	Monaco	2009 IAAF Super Grand Prix	
20	31 July	DN Galan	Stockholm	Sweden	2009 IAAF Super Grand Prix	
–	25 August	Tallinn Meeting	Tallinn	Estonia	EAA Area Permit Meeting	
21	28 August	Weltklasse Zürich	Zürich	Switzerland	2009 IAAF Golden League	
22	31 August	British Grand Prix	Gateshead	United Kingdom	2009 IAAF Grand Prix	
23	31 August	Hanžeković Memorial	Zagreb	Croatia	2009 IAAF Grand Prix	
–	1 September	Palio Città della Quercia	Rovereto	Italy	EAA Area Permit Meeting	
24	4 September	Memorial Van Damme	Brussels	Belgium	2009 IAAF Golden League	
25	6 September	Rieti Meeting	Rieti	Italy	2009 IAAF Grand Prix	
F	12–13 September	2009 IAAF World Athletics Final	Thessaloniki	Greece	IAAF World Athletics Final	

== Points standings ==
Athletes earned points at meetings during the series. The following athletes were the top performers for their event prior to the World Athletics Final.

Event	Male athlete	Points	Female athlete	Points
100 metres	Asafa Powell (JAM)	92	Kerron Stewart (JAM)	100
200 metres	Wallace Spearmon (USA)	58	Debbie Ferguson-McKenzie (BAH)	55
400 metres	Jeremy Wariner (USA)	86	Sanya Richards (USA)	100
800 metres	Yuriy Borzakovskiy (RUS) David Rudisha (KEN)	72	Jemma Simpson (GBR)	64
1500 metres	Augustine Kiprono Choge (KEN)	74	Gelete Burka (ETH)	86
3000 metres	Eliud Kipchoge (KEN)	40	Wude Ayalew (ETH)	16
5000 metres	Kenenisa Bekele (ETH)	100	Tirunesh Dibaba (ETH)	28
100/110 metres hurdles	Dayron Robles (CUB)	100	Brigitte Foster-Hylton (JAM) Priscilla Lopes-Schliep (CAN)	86
400 metres hurdles	Kerron Clement (USA)	74	Melaine Walker (JAM)	74
3000 metres steeplechase	Ezekiel Kemboi (KEN)	74	Ruth Bosibori (KEN)	68
Pole vault	Steve Hooker (AUS)	70	Yelena Isinbayeva (RUS)	106
High jump	Jaroslav Bába (CZE)	66	Blanka Vlašić (CRO)	100
Long jump	Godfrey Khotso Mokoena (RSA)	78	Funmi Jimoh (USA)	60
Triple jump	Arnie David Giralt (CUB)	62	Yargelis Savigne (CUB)	62
Shot put	Reese Hoffa (USA)	62	Nadine Kleinert (GER)	56
Discus throw	Gerd Kanter (EST)	50	Yarelys Barrios (CUB)	40
Javelin throw	Andreas Thorkildsen (NOR)	80	Steffi Nerius (GER)	61
Hammer throw	Krisztián Pars (HUN)	50	Anita Włodarczyk (POL)	48
