= 1996 IAAF Grand Prix =

International track and field competition

- Edition: 12th
- Dates: 29 February – 16 September 1996
- Meetings: 29 (+1 final)

The 1996 IAAF Grand Prix was the twelfth edition of the annual global series of one-day track and field competitions organized by the International Association of Athletics Federations (IAAF). The series consisted of three levels: IAAF Grand Prix, IAAF Grand Prix II and finally IAAF Permit Meetings. There were seventeen Grand Prix meetings and twelve Grand Prix II meetings, making a combined total of 29 meetings for the series from 29 February to 16 September. An additional ten IAAF Outdoor Permit Meetings were attached to the circuit.

Performances on designated events on the circuit earned athletes points which qualified them for entry to the 1996 IAAF Grand Prix Final, held on 7 September in Milan, Italy. Daniel Komen was the winner of the overall men's title with 103 points, while Ludmila Enquist topped the women's rankings with 93 points.

== Meetings ==
Key: Non-Grand Prix, scoring meeting

1996 IAAF Grand Prix meetings
#	Date	Meeting name	City	Country	Level
1	29 February	NEC Classic	Melbourne	Australia	IAAF Grand Prix II
—	12 April	ASA Engen Meet	Cape Town	South Africa	IAAF Permit Meeting
2	14 April	International Meeting Johannesburg	Johannesburg	South Africa	IAAF Grand Prix II
—	28 April	Shiv Chatrapati (Note: Although listed in pre-season schedules, this meeting unlikely took place, as post-season and contemporary newspaper results were not found.)	New Delhi	India	IAAF Grand Prix II
—	4 May	Jakarta International Meet	Jakarta	Indonesia	IAAF Permit Meeting
3	4 May	Grand Prix Brasil de Atletismo	Rio de Janeiro	Brazil	IAAF Grand Prix I
4	11 May	Osaka Grand Prix	Osaka	Japan	IAAF Grand Prix I
5	18 May	Atlanta Pre-Olympic Meeting	Atlanta	United States	IAAF Grand Prix I
—	25 May	Vittel Stadium Meeting	Lille	France	IAAF Permit Meeting
6	26 May	Prefontaine Classic	Eugene	United States	IAAF Grand Prix I
7	27 May	Adriaan Paulen Memorial	Hengelo	Netherlands	IAAF Grand Prix II
8	29 May	Slovnaft Meeting	Bratislava	Slovakia	IAAF Grand Prix II
9	1 June	Bruce Jenner Classic	San Jose	United States	IAAF Grand Prix II
—	2 June	Harry Jerome Track Classic	Vancouver	Canada	IAAF Permit Meeting
10	3 June	Meeting L'Humanite	St. Denis	France	IAAF Grand Prix II
11	5 June	Golden Gala	Rome	Italy	IAAF Grand Prix I
12	6 June	Gran Premio Diputacion	Seville	Spain	IAAF Grand Prix II
13	7 June	Znamensky Memorial	Moscow	Russia	IAAF Grand Prix I
—	12 June	Comunidad de Madrid Meeting	Madrid	Spain	IAAF Permit Meeting
—	20 June	Budapest Invitation Meeting	Budapest	Hungary	IAAF Permit Meeting
14	25 June	Helsinki World Games	Helsinki	Finland	IAAF Grand Prix II
15	28 June	Meeting Gaz de France	Paris	France	IAAF Grand Prix I
—	29 June	Goodwill Meeting	Saint Petersburg	Russia	IAAF Permit Meeting
16	30 June	Bupa International Games	Gateshead	United Kingdom	IAAF Grand Prix II
17	3 July	Athletissima	Lausanne	Switzerland	IAAF Grand Prix I
18	5 July	Mobil Bislett Games	Oslo	Norway	IAAF Grand Prix I
19	8 July	DN Galan	Stockholm	Sweden	IAAF Grand Prix I
20	10 July	Meeting Nikaia	Nice	France	IAAF Grand Prix I
21	12 July	KP Games	London	United Kingdom	IAAF Grand Prix I
—	7 August	International Meeting Sestriere	Sestriere	Italy	IAAF Permit Meeting
22	10 August	Herculis Vittel	Monaco	Monaco	IAAF Grand Prix I
23	14 August	Weltklasse	Zurich	Switzerland	IAAF Grand Prix I
24	16 August	Weltklasse in Koln	Cologne	Germany	IAAF Grand Prix I
25	21 August	Zipfer Grand Prix	Linz	Austria	IAAF Grand Prix II
26	23 August	Memorial Van Damme	Brussels	Belgium	IAAF Grand Prix I
—	25 August	McDonald's Games	London	United Kingdom	IAAF Permit Meeting
27	30 August	ISTAF Berlin	Berlin	Germany	IAAF Grand Prix I
28	1 September	Meeting Rieti	Rieti	Italy	IAAF Grand Prix II
F	7 September	1996 IAAF Grand Prix Final	Milan	Italy	IAAF Grand Prix Final
—	16 September	Toto International Super Meet	Tokyo	Japan	IAAF Permit Meeting

== Points standings ==
=== Overall men ===
1996 IAAF Grand Prix men's standings
Rank	Athlete	Nation	Points
1	Daniel Komen	Kenya	103
2	Jonathan Edwards	Great Britain	99
3	Dennis Mitchell	United States	95
4	Noureddine Morceli	Algeria	93
5	Derrick Adkins	United States	91
6	Samuel Matete	Zambia	90
7	Donovan Bailey	Canada	85
8	Maksim Tarasov	Russia	79.5
9	Igor Astapkovich	Belarus	77
10	Balazs Kiss	Hungary	77

=== Overall women ===
1996 IAAF Grand Prix women's standings
Rank	Athlete	Nation	Points
1	Ludmila Enquist	Sweden	93
2	Merlene Ottey	Jamaica	90
3	Michelle Freeman	Jamaica	85
4	Falilat Ogunkoya	Nigeria	83
5	Inessa Kravets	Ukraine	80
6	Oksana Ovchinnikova	Russia	78
7	Ilke Wyludda	Germany	76
8	Cathy Freeman	Australia	75
9	Tanja Damaske	Germany	72
10	Pauline Davis	Bahamas	71
