= IAAF Super Grand Prix =

Sporting competition organised by the IAAF

- Sport: Track and field
- Founded: 2003
- Ceased: 2009
- Continent: Global

The IAAF Super Grand Prix was an annual series of one-day track and field competitions organized by the International Association of Athletics Federations (IAAF). Over the competition's history, a total of nine different meetings were part of the circuit – all of which were European meetings with the sole exception of the Qatar Athletic Super Grand Prix, introduced in 2004.

Created in 2003, it became the second-highest tier in the IAAF World Outdoor Meetings series, behind the IAAF Golden League and above the IAAF Grand Prix and IAAF Grand Prix II level meetings. It began with seven meetings and expanded to eight meetings for the 2004 and 2005 series. In 2006 the competition was incorporated into the IAAF World Athletics Tour, retaining its status as the second highest tier of annual meetings. The series was reduced in scope to six meetings that year, then had only five meetings in its last three years.

Athletes earned points at the meetings, dependent upon their finishing position, and the overall points leaders from the wider circuit gained entry to the annual IAAF World Athletics Final. The IAAF Super Grand Prix was made defunct along with the World Athletics Tour in 2010, as both were replaced by the IAAF Diamond League and IAAF World Challenge series. Six of the nine Super Grand Prix meetings were elevated to the Diamond League series.

== Editions ==
Key: As part of IAAF World Outdoor Meetings As part of IAAF World Athletics Tour

Edition	Year	Start date	End date	Meets	Ref.
1	2003	12 June	8 August	7	
2	2004	14 May	30 July	8	
3	2005	13 May	21 August	8	
4	2006	12 May	20 August	6	
5	2007	11 May	7 August	5	
6	2008	9 May	2 September	5	
7	2009	8 May	31 August	5	

== Meetings ==
#	Meeting	City	Country	2003	2004	2005	2006	2007	2008	2009
7	Athletissima	Lausanne	Switzerland	SGP	SGP	SGP	SGP	SGP	SGP	SGP
7	London Grand Prix	London	United Kingdom	SGP	SGP	SGP	SGP	SGP	SGP	SGP
6	DN Galan	Stockholm	Sweden	SGP	SGP	SGP	SGP	SGP	SGP	SGP
4	Qatar Athletic Super Grand Prix	Doha	Qatar	–	SGP	SGP	SGP	SGP	SGP	SGP
4	Herculis	Monte Carlo	Monaco	–	–	–	SGP	SGP	SGP	SGP
4	Athens Grand Prix Tsiklitiria	Athens	Greece	SGP	SGP	SGP	SGP	–	–	–
3	British Grand Prix	Gateshead	United Kingdom	SGP	SGP	SGP	–	–	–	–
3	Golden Spike Ostrava	Ostrava	Czech Republic	SGP	SGP	SGP	–	–	–	–
3	Meeting de Atletismo Madrid	Madrid	Spain	SGP	SGP	SGP	–	–	–	–
