= 2008 IAAF Golden League =

Athletics competition series

The 2008 Golden League was the 11th edition of the IAAF's annual series of six athletics meets, held across Europe, with athletes having the chance to win the Golden League Jackpot of $1 million.

== Programme ==
Meet calendar
Meeting	Venue	Date
Internationales Stadionfest	Berlin, Germany	1 June
Bislett Games	Oslo, Norway	6 June
Golden Gala	Rome, Italy	11 July
Meeting Areva	Paris, France	18 July
Weltklasse Zürich	Zürich, Switzerland	29 August
Memorial Van Damme	Brussels, Belgium	5 September

Jackpot events
Men	100 m	400 m	1500 m / Mile	400 m hurdles	Long jump	Javelin throw
Women	200 m	800 m	100 m hurdles	High jump		

== Results ==
=== Men ===
Event	ISTAF Berlin	Bislett Games Oslo	Golden Gala Rome	Meeting Gaz de France Paris	Weltklasse Zürich	Memorial van Damme Brussels
100 m	Nesta Carter (JAM); 10.08	Derrick Atkins (BAH); 9.98	Francis Obikwelu (POR); 10.04	Marc Burns (TRI); 10.14	Usain Bolt (JAM); 9.83	Usain Bolt (JAM); 9.77
4X100 m relay	-	-	-	-	United States (USA); 38.01	-
200 m	-	Brendan Christian (ATG); 20.39	-	-	-	-
400 m	LaShawn Merritt (USA); 44.03	Jeremy Wariner (USA); 43.98	Jeremy Wariner (USA); 44.36	Jeremy Wariner (USA); 43.86	Jeremy Wariner (USA); 43.82	Jeremy Wariner (USA); 44.44
800 m	Abraham Chepkirwok (UGA); 1:44.53	Abubaker Kaki Khamis (SUD); 1:42.69	Amine Laalou (MAR); 1:44.27	-	-	Yusuf Saad Kamel (BHR); 1:44.56
1500 m / 1 mile	Augustine Choge (KEN); 3:31.57	Thomas Lancashire (GBR); 3:35.33	Asbel Kiprop (KEN); 3:31.64	Augustine Choge (KEN); 3:32.40	Haron Keitany (KEN); 3:32.06	Belal Mansoor Ali (BHR); 3:35.94
1500 m / 1 mile	-	Andrew Baddeley (GBR); 3:49.38	-	-	-	-
3000 m	-	-	-	Edwin Soi (KEN); 7:36.31	-	-
5000 m	Moses Ndiema Masai (KEN); 12:50.55	-	Sileshi Sihine (ETH); 13:04.94	-	Kenenisa Bekele (ETH); 12:50.18	Eliud Kipchoge (KEN); 13:06.12
10000 m	-	-	-	-	-	Sileshi Sihine (ETH); 27:06.97
3000 m steeplechase	-	-	Brimin Kiprop Kipruto (KEN); 8:15.71	Tareq Mubarak Taher (BHR); 8:08.53	Paul Kipsiele Koech (KEN); 8:04.26	Paul Kipsiele Koech (KEN); 8:04.99
110 m hurdles	David Oliver (USA); 13.19	-	Dayron Robles (CUB); 13.08	Dayron Robles (CUB); 12.88	Dayron Robles (CUB); 12.97	-
400 m hurdles	Bershawn Jackson (USA); 48.73	Bershawn Jackson (USA); 48.15	Kerron Clement (USA); 48.23	Kerron Clement (USA); 48.33	Angelo Taylor (USA); 48.07	Kerron Clement (USA); 48.29
Long jump	Hussein Taher Al-Sabee (KSA); 8.21	Hussein Taher Al-Sabee (KSA); 8.19	Irving Saladino (PAN); 8.30	Irving Saladino (PAN); 8.31	Hussein Taher Al-Sabee (KSA); 8.35	Miguel Pate (USA); 8.02
Pole vault	Evgeniy Lukyanenko (RUS); 5.85	-	-	Steven Hooker (AUS); 5.70	-	-
Discus throw	Ehsan Haddadi (IRI); 69.12	-	-	-	-	-
Javelin throw	Tero Pitkämäki (FIN); 85.20	Andreas Thorkildsen (NOR); 87.73	Tero Pitkämäki (FIN); 87.70	Vadims Vasiļevskis (LAT); 85.61	Andreas Thorkildsen (NOR); 90.28	Tero Pitkämäki (FIN); 85.82

=== Women ===
Event	ISTAF Berlin	Bislett Games Oslo	Golden Gala Rome	Meeting Gaz de France Paris	Weltklasse Zürich	Memorial van Damme Brussels
100 m	-	Sheri-Ann Brooks (JAM); 11.24	-	-	-	Kim Gevaert (BEL); 11.25
200 m	Sherone Simpson (JAM); 22.43	Bianca Knight (USA); 22.56	Kerron Stewart (JAM); 22.34	Sanya Richards (USA); 22.56	Allyson Felix (USA); 22.37	Marshevet Hooker (USA); 22.62
400 m	-	-	Allyson Felix (USA); 50.25	-	Sanya Richards (USA); 49.74	-
800 m	Pamela Jelimo (KEN); 1:54.99	Pamela Jelimo (KEN); 1:55.41	Pamela Jelimo (KEN); 1.55.69	Pamela Jelimo (KEN); 1.54.97	Pamela Jelimo (KEN); 1:54.01	Pamela Jelimo (KEN); 1:55.16
1500 m	-	-	-	Maryam Yusuf Jamal (BHR); 3:59.99	-	-
5000 m	Sylvia Kibet (KEN); 15:05.09	Tirunesh Dibaba (ETH); 14:11.15 (WR)	Tirunesh Dibaba (ETH); 14:36.58	Lucy Wangui (KEN); 14:38.47	-	Vivian Cheruiyot (KEN); 14:25.43
3000 m steeplechase	-	Gulnara Samitova-Galkina (RUS); 9:14.77	-	-	-	-
100 m hurdles	Josephine Onyia (ESP); 12.50	Josephine Onyia (ESP); 12.59	Brigitte Foster-Hylton (JAM); 12.60	Brigitte Foster-Hylton (JAM); 12.66	Lolo Jones (USA); 12.56	Delloreen Ennis-London (JAM); 12.65
400 m hurdles	-	-	Melaine Walker (JAM); 54.36	-	-	-
High jump	Blanka Vlašić (CRO); 2.03	Blanka Vlašić (CRO); 2.04	Blanka Vlašić (CRO); 2.00	Blanka Vlašić (CRO); 2.01	Blanka Vlašić (CRO); 2.01	Ariane Friedrich (GER); 2.00
Pole vault	-	-	Yelena Isinbaeva (RUS); 5.03 (WR)	-	Yelena Isinbaeva (RUS); 4.88	Yelena Isinbaeva (RUS); 4.72
