= 2003 IAAF Golden League =

Athletics competition series

The 2003 Golden League was the sixth edition of the IAAF's annual series of six athletics meets, held across Europe, with athletes having the chance to win the Golden League Jackpot of $1 million.

== Programme ==
Meet calendar
Meeting	Venue	Date
Bislett Games	Oslo, Norway	27 June
Meeting Gaz de France	Paris, France	4 July
Golden Gala	Rome, Italy	11 July
Internationales Stadionfest	Berlin, Germany	10 August
Weltklasse Zürich	Zürich, Switzerland	15 August
Memorial Van Damme	Brussels, Belgium	5 September

Jackpot events
Men	100 m	800 m	3000 m / 5000 m	110 m hurdles	Pole vault	Javelin throw
Women	100 m	800 m	1500 m	400 m hurdles	Triple jump	High jump

== Results ==
=== Men ===
Event	Bislett Games Oslo	Meeting Gaz de France Paris	Golden Gala Rome	ISTAF Berlin	Weltklasse Zürich	Memorial van Damme Brussels
100 m	Mark Lewis-Francis (GBR); 10.12	Bernard Williams (USA); 10.05	John Capel (USA); 10.04	Darvis Patton (USA); 10.17	John Capel (USA); Justin Gatlin (USA); 9.97	Asafa Powell (JAM); 10.02
4X100 m relay	-	-	-	United States (USA); 37.77	-	-
200 m	-	John Capel (USA); 20.21	Bernard Williams (USA); 20.01	-	-	Justin Gatlin (USA); 20.04
400 m	Cédric Van Branteghem (BEL); 45.55	-	Tyree Washington (USA); 44.42	Jerome Young (USA); 45.11	-	Cédric Van Branteghem (BEL); 45.02
800 m	Mbulaeni Mulaudzi (RSA); 1:44.11	Yuriy Borzakovskiy (RUS); 1:43.94	Mbulaeni Mulaudzi (RSA); 1:44.00	Hezekiél Sepeng (RSA); 1:44.71	Mbulaeni Mulaudzi (RSA); 1:44.12	Wilfred Bungei (KEN); 1:42.52
1500 m	-	-	Hicham El Guerrouj (MAR); 3:29.76	-	Hicham El Guerrouj (MAR); 3:29.13	Hicham El Guerrouj (MAR); 3:28.40
3000 m / 5000 m	-	-	-	Leonard Mucheru Maina (KEN); 7:38.36	-	Ali Saïdi-Sief (ALG); 7:30.79
3000 m / 5000 m	Kenenisa Bekele (ETH); 12:52.26	Abraham Chebii (KEN); 12:53.37	Abraham Chebii (KEN); 12:57.14	-	John Kibowen (KEN); 13:01.01	-
10000 m	-	-	-	-	-	Kenenisa Bekele (ETH); 26:29.22
3000 m steeplechase	-	Saif Saaeed Shaheen (QAT); 8:06.41	-	-	Saif Saaeed Shaheen (QAT); 8:02.48	Saif Saaeed Shaheen (QAT); 8:00.06
110 m hurdles	Staņislavs Olijars (LAT); 13.14	Allen Johnson (USA); 12.97	Allen Johnson (USA); 13.08	Staņislavs Olijars (LAT); 13.15	Duane Ross (USA); 13.22	Allen Johnson (USA); 13.16
400 m hurdles	Boris Gorban (RUS); 49.95	Félix Sánchez (DOM); 48.30	Félix Sánchez (DOM); 48.15	-	Félix Sánchez (DOM); 47.82	-
Triple jump	-	-	-	-	Marian Oprea (ROM); 17.24	-
High jump	-	-	Jacques Freitag (RSA); 2.35	-	-	-
Pole vault	Nick Hysong (USA); 5.70	Derek Miles (USA); 5.76	Romain Mesnil (FRA); 5.92	Dmitri Markov (AUS); 5.86	Okkert Brits (RSA); 5.80	Denys Yurchenko (UKR); 5.80
Discus throw	-	-	-	-	Róbert Fazekas (HUN); 69.14	-
Javelin throw	Sergey Makarov (RUS); 85.61	Jan Železný (CZE); 89.06	Sergey Makarov (RUS); 84.74	Raymond Hecht (GER); 84.32	Jan Železný (CZE); 87.95	Boris Henry (GER); 84.33

=== Women ===
Event	Bislett Games Oslo	Meeting Gaz de France Paris	Golden Gala Rome	ISTAF Berlin	Weltklasse Zürich	Memorial van Damme Brussels
100 m	Chandra Sturrup (BAH); 10.96	Chandra Sturrup (BAH); 11.01	Chandra Sturrup (BAH); 10.89	Chryste Gaines (USA); 10.86	Chryste Gaines (USA); 10.89	Chryste Gaines (USA); 10.88
200 m	-	Muriel Hurtis-Houairi (FRA); 22.62	Torri Edwards (USA); 22.28	-	-	Kim Gevaert (BEL); 22.72
400 m	-	-	-	Lorraine Fenton (JAM); 49.98	Ana Guevara (MEX); 49.11	-
800 m	Maria Mutola (MOZ); 2:00.62	Maria Mutola (MOZ); 1:57.58	Maria Mutola (MOZ); 1:57.21	Maria Mutola (MOZ); 1:59.01	Maria Mutola (MOZ); 1:59.93	Maria Mutola (MOZ); 1:57.78
1500 m	Iryna Lishchynska (UKR); 4:04.62	Natalia Rodríguez (ESP); 4:03.33	Olga Yegorova (RUS); 4:01.00	Süreyya Ayhan (TUR); 3:59.58	Süreyya Ayhan (TUR); 3:55.60	Süreyya Ayhan (TUR); 3:55.33
3000 m	-	Gabriela Szabo (ROM); 8:34.09	-	-	Gabriela Szabo (ROM); 8:33.95	-
5000 m	Berhane Adere (ETH); 14:29.32	-	Meseret Defar (ETH); 14:40.34	-	-	Derartu Tulu (ETH); 14:44.22
100 m hurdles	-	Gail Devers (USA); 12.49	-	-	Gail Devers (USA); 12.50	-
400 m hurdles	Jana Rawlinson (AUS); 54.42	Sandra Glover (USA); 54.47	Jana Rawlinson (AUS); 53.62	Jana Rawlinson (AUS); 53.94	Sandra Glover (USA); 54.50	Yuliya Pechonkina (RUS); 53.49
Long jump	-	-	Elva Goulbourne (JAM); 6.71	Elva Goulbourne (JAM); 6.77	-	-
Triple jump	Yamilé Aldama (SUD); 15.11	Tatyana Lebedeva (RUS); 15.12	Yamilé Aldama (SUD); 15.29	Tatyana Lebedeva (RUS); 14.89	Françoise Mbango Etone (CMR); 14.87	Tatyana Lebedeva (RUS); 15.14
High jump	Inha Babakova (UKR); 2.01	Blanka Vlašić (CRO); 1.99	Hestrie Cloete (RSA); 2.00	Hestrie Cloete (RSA); 2.05	Hestrie Cloete (RSA); 2.03	Hestrie Cloete (RSA); 2.03
Javelin throw	-	-	-	-	-	Tatyana Shikolenko (RUS); 61.36
