= Prefontaine Classic =

Track and field meet held in Oregon, United States

Coordinates: 44.042°N 123.071°W

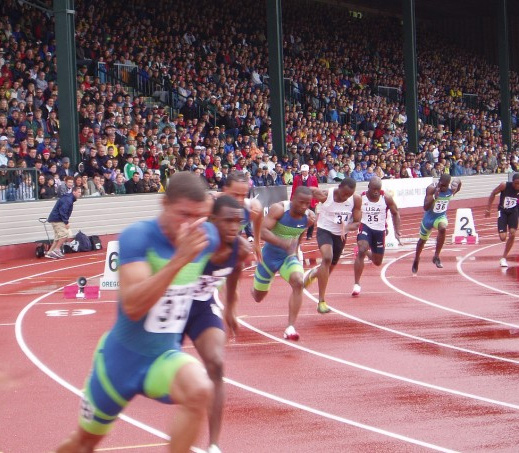
- Start of the 200m during the 2006 edition
- Date: May – September
- Location: Hayward Field; Eugene, Oregon, U.S.
- Event type: Track and field
- World Athletics Cat.: GW/DF
- Established: 20 June 1973; 53 years ago 1975 as Prefontaine Classic
- Website: Diamond League Eugene
- 2026 Prefontaine Classic

Location in the United States

Logo

The Prefontaine Classic is a track and field meet held at Hayward Field on the campus of the University of Oregon in Eugene, Oregon, United States. Organized by the Oregon Track Club, it was previously one of the IAAF Grand Prix events, and is now part of the Diamond League. The meet is one of the few international competitions to host the imperial distances of the Mile run (Bowerman Mile) and 2 Mile run.

== History ==
The first Prefontaine Classic was held in 1975. The meet had its genesis with the Hayward Restoration Meets of 1973–74. The Hayward Restoration meets were launched to help replace the deteriorated wooden West Grandstands at Hayward Field. It was to become the "Bowerman Classic" in 1975 to honor longtime University of Oregon track coach Bill Bowerman, and was scheduled for June 7. With the unexpected death of University of Oregon distance runner and Olympian Steve Prefontaine in an automobile accident on May 30, the Oregon Track Club changed the name, with Bowerman's approval, on June 1; the first "Pre Classic" was held six days later. Nike has been the primary sponsor since 1978. The 2019 edition moved to Stanford's Cobb Track and Angell Field, Palo Alto, California because of restoration of Hayward Field in anticipation of the IAAF World Athletics Championships in 2021. The 2020 edition was cancelled due to the COVID-19 pandemic.

In 2023, the Prefontaine Classic was held as the Diamond League Final for the first time.

== Editions ==
Prefontaine Classic editions
Ed.	Meeting	Series	Date	Ref.
	1973 Hayward Restoration Meet		20 Jun 1973	
	1974 Hayward Restoration Meet		8 Jun 1974	
1st	1975 Prefontaine Classic		7 Jun 1975	
2nd	1976 Prefontaine Classic		5 Jun 1976	
3rd	1977 Prefontaine Classic		14 Jun 1977	
4th	1978 Prefontaine Classic		31 May 1978	
5th	1979 Prefontaine Classic		2 Jun 1979	
6th	1980 Prefontaine Classic		6 Jun 1980	
7th	1981 Prefontaine Classic		6 Jun 1981	
8th	1982 Prefontaine Classic		5 Jun 1982	
9th	1983 Prefontaine Classic		4 Jun 1983	
10th	1984 Prefontaine Classic		21 Jul 1984	
11th	1985 Prefontaine Classic		1 Jun 1985	
12th	1986 Prefontaine Classic		7 Jun 1986	
13th	1987 Prefontaine Classic		6 Jun 1987	
14th	1988 Prefontaine Classic		2 Jul 1988	
15th	1989 Prefontaine Classic		3 Jun 1989	
16th	1990 Prefontaine Classic		1 Jun 1990	
17th	1991 Prefontaine Classic		21 Jun 1991	
18th	1992 Prefontaine Classic		6 Jun 1992	
19th	1993 Prefontaine Classic		5 Jun 1993	
20th	1994 Prefontaine Classic		4 Jun 1994	
21st	1995 Prefontaine Classic		4 Jun 1995	
22nd	1996 Prefontaine Classic	1996 IAAF Grand Prix	26 May 1996	
23rd	1997 Prefontaine Classic	1997 IAAF Grand Prix	25 May 1997	
24th	1998 Prefontaine Classic	1998 IAAF Grand Prix	31 May 1998	
25th	1999 Prefontaine Classic	1999 IAAF Grand Prix	30 May 1999	
26th	2000 Prefontaine Classic	2000 IAAF Grand Prix	24 Jun 2000	
27th	2001 Prefontaine Classic	2001 IAAF Grand Prix	27 May 2001	
28th	2002 Prefontaine Classic	2002 IAAF Grand Prix	26 May 2002	
29th	2003 Prefontaine Classic	2003 IAAF Grand Prix	24 May 2003	
30th	2004 Prefontaine Classic	2004 IAAF Grand Prix	19 Jun 2004	
31st	2005 Prefontaine Classic	2005 IAAF Grand Prix	4 Jun 2005	
32nd	2006 Prefontaine Classic	2006 IAAF Grand Prix	28 May 2006	
33rd	2007 Prefontaine Classic	2007 IAAF Grand Prix	10 Jun 2007	
34th	2008 Prefontaine Classic	2008 IAAF Grand Prix	8 Jun 2008	
35th	2009 Prefontaine Classic	2009 IAAF Grand Prix	7 Jun 2009	
36th	2010 Prefontaine Classic	2010 Diamond League	3 Jul 2010	
37th	2011 Prefontaine Classic	2011 Diamond League	4 Jun 2011	
38th	2012 Prefontaine Classic	2012 Diamond League	2 Jun 2012	
39th	2013 Prefontaine Classic	2013 Diamond League	31 May–1 Jun 2013	
40th	2014 Prefontaine Classic	2014 Diamond League	31 May 2014	
41st	2015 Prefontaine Classic	2015 Diamond League	30 May 2015	
42nd	2016 Prefontaine Classic	2016 Diamond League	27–28 May 2016	
43rd	2017 Prefontaine Classic	2017 Diamond League	27 May 2017	
44th	2018 Prefontaine Classic	2018 Diamond League	26 May 2018	
45th	2019 Prefontaine Classic	2019 Diamond League	30 Jun 2019	
2020: Meet canceled due to COVID-19
46th	2021 Prefontaine Classic	2021 Diamond League	21 Aug 2021	
47th	2022 Prefontaine Classic	2022 Diamond League	28 May 2022	
48th	2023 Prefontaine Classic	2023 Diamond League	16–17 Sep 2023	
49th	2024 Prefontaine Classic	2024 Diamond League	25 May 2024	
50th	2025 Prefontaine Classic	2025 Diamond League	5 Jul 2025	
51st	2026 Prefontaine Classic	2026 Diamond League	3–4 Jul 2026	

== World records ==
Over the course of its history, nine world records have been set at the Prefontaine Classic.

World records set at the Prefontaine Classic
Year	Event	Record	Athlete	Nationality	Ref.
1975	220 yard dash	19.92	Don Quarrie	Jamaica	
1982	5000 m	15:08.26	Mary Decker Slaney	United States	
2011	30 km (track)	1:26:47.4	Moses Mosop	Kenya	
2011	25 km (track)	1:12:25.4+	Moses Mosop	Kenya	
2023	Pole vault	6.23 m	Armand Duplantis	Sweden	
2023	5000 m	14:00.21	Gudaf Tsegay	Ethiopia	
2024	10,000 m	28:54.14	Beatrice Chebet	Kenya	
2025	1500 m	3:48.68	Faith Kipyegon	Kenya	
2025	5000 m	13:58.06	Beatrice Chebet	Kenya	

== Other notable performances and records ==
=== 2001: Alan Webb's high school mile record ===
At the 2001 Prefontaine Classic, Alan Webb competed against elite international runners, in a field that included world record holder Hicham El Guerrouj, and the 2000 Sydney Olympics 1500m bronze medalist Bernard Lagat.

Webb ran 3:53.43 in the Bowerman Mile and broke Jim Ryun's national high school record that had stood for 36 years. This was also the fastest mile by an American in three years.

=== 1993–2008: Maria Mutola in the 800 m ===
Maria de Lurdes Mutola won 16 consecutive (1993–2008) women's 800 m races at the Pre Classic.

=== 2023: Jakob Ingebrigtsen's mile & 3000m double ===
In the 2023 Prefontaine Classic & Diamond League Final, on September 16, Norwegian athlete Jakob Ingebrigtsen won the Bowerman Mile, in a time of 3:43.73, with the aid of pacing lights and pacemakers Erik Sowinski & Cameron Myers.

Ingebrigtsen missed Hicham El Guerrouj's mile world record by .60 seconds, still having run the fastest mile in 24 years and the third fastest mile in history at the time.

Ingebrigtsen was closely followed by Yared Nuguse, who finished in an American record time of 3:43.97, breaking Alan Webb's former American mile record of 3:46.91 by almost three full seconds and running the fourth fastest mile in history at the time.

The race was reminiscent of El Guerrouj's 1999 world record run in Rome, where El Guerrouj won in 3:43.13, but was being closely tracked by Kenyan athlete Noah Ngeny, who came in second place at 3:43.40. El Guerrouj and Ngeny held the first and second fastest mile times until Josh Kerr broke the world record on July 18th, 2026 at the London Athletics Meet.

These men (El Guerrouj, Ngeny, Ingebrigtsen, Nuguse) remained the only ones in history to have run a mile under 3:44.00 until Kerr joined them in 2026. Noureddine Morceli, with his 1993 time of 3:44.39 is now 6th all-time.

The next day, Ingebrigtsen would go on to win the 3000 m, in a time of 7:23.63, beating Yomif Kejelcha by only one hundredth of a second. At the time, this ranked Kejelcha at #4 all time and Ingebrigtsen at #3 all time, behind Hicham El Guerrouj's 7:23.09 and Daniel Komen's world record of 7:20.67.

== Meeting records ==
=== Men ===
Men's meeting records of the Prefontaine Classic
Event	Record	Athlete	Nationality	Date	Meet	Ref.	Video
100 m	9.80 (+1.3 m/s)	Steve Mullings	Jamaica	4 June 2011	2011		
200 m	19.52 (+1.5 m/s)	Noah Lyles	United States	21 August 2021	2021		
300 m	31.30	LaShawn Merritt	United States	7 June 2009	2009		
400 m	43.60	Michael Norman	United States	28 May 2022	2022		
800 m	1:42.80	Emmanuel Wanyonyi	Kenya	17 September 2023	2023		
1000 m	2:13.62	Abubaker Kaki Khamis	Sudan	3 July 2010	2010		
1500 m	3:28.76+ (Note: by Athletics Weekly source; 3:28.9 by official 1 Mile Run Race Analysis)	Jakob Ingebrigtsen	Norway	16 September 2023	2023		
Mile	3:43.73 DLR	Jakob Ingebrigtsen	Norway	16 September 2023	2023		
3000 m	7:23.63	Jakob Ingebrigtsen	Norway	17 September 2023	2023		
Two miles	8:03.50	Craig Mottram	Australia	10 June 2007	2007		
5000 m	12:50.05	Berihu Aregawi	Ethiopia	28 May 2022	2022		
10,000 m	26:25.97	Kenenisa Bekele	Ethiopia	8 June 2008	2008		
25,000 m (track)	1:12:25.4+	Moses Mosop	Kenya	3 June 2011	2011		
30,000 m (track)	1:26:47.4	Moses Mosop	Kenya	3 June 2011	2011		
110 m hurdles	12.86 (+1.8 m/s)	Jamal Britt	United States	4 July 2026	2026		
400 m hurdles	46.39	Rai Benjamin	United States	16 September 2023	2023		
3000 m steeplechase	8:01.71	Ezekiel Kemboi	Kenya	30 May 2015	2015		
High jump	2.41 m	Mutaz Essa Barshim	Qatar	30 May 2015	2015		
Pole vault	6.23 m	Armand Duplantis	Sweden	17 September 2023	2023		
Long jump	8.74 m (−1.2 m/s)	Dwight Phillips	United States	7 June 2009	2009		
Triple jump	18.11 m (+0.8 m/s) DLR	Christian Taylor	United States	27 May 2017	2017		
Shot put	23.15 m	Ryan Crouser	United States	21 August 2021	2021		
Discus throw	71.32 m	Ben Plucknett	United States	4 June 1983	1983		
Hammer throw	83.33 m DLR	Ethan Katzberg	Canada	3 July 2026	2026		
Javelin throw	93.72 m (old design)	Tom Petranoff	United States	4 June 1983	1983		
Javelin throw	89.88 m (current design)	Thomas Röhler	Germany	25 May 2018	2018		

=== Women ===
Women's meeting records of the Prefontaine Classic
Event	Record	Athlete	Nationality	Date	Meet	Ref.
100 m	10.54 (+0.9 m/s) DLR	Elaine Thompson-Herah	Jamaica	21 August 2021	2021	
200 m	21.57 (+0.3 m/s)	Shericka Jackson	Jamaica	17 September 2023	2023	
400 m	49.34	Ana Guevara	Mexico	24 May 2003	2003	
800 m	1:54.97	Athing Mu	United States	17 September 2023	2023	
1000 m	2:32.33	Maria Mutola	Mozambique	4 June 1995	1995	
1500 m	3:48.68 WR	Faith Kipyegon	Kenya	5 July 2025	2025	
Mile	4:17.49	Nikki Hiltz	United States	4 July 2026	2026	
2000 m	5:31.52	Vivian Cheruiyot	Kenya	7 June 2009	2009	
3000 m	8:18.49	Sifan Hassan	Netherlands	30 June 2019	2019	
Two miles	8:59.08 DLR	Francine Niyonsaba	Burundi	27 May 2022	2022	
5000 m	13:58.06 WR	Beatrice Chebet	Kenya	5 July 2025	2025	
10,000 m	28:54.14 WR	Beatrice Chebet	Kenya	25 May 2024	2024	
100 m hurdles	12.24 (+0.7 m/s)	Kendra Harrison	United States	28 May 2016	2016	
100 m hurdles	12.24 (+0.8 m/s)	Masai Russell	United States	4 July 2026	2026	
400 m hurdles	51.98	Femke Bol	Netherlands	17 September 2023	2023	
3000 m steeplechase	8:45.25	Winfred Yavi	Bahrain	5 July 2025	2025	
High jump	2.04 m	Mariya Lasitskene	Russia	30 June 2019	2019	
Pole vault	4.86 m	Katie Moon	United States	16 September 2023	2023	
Long jump	7.31 m (+1.9 m/s)	Marion Jones	United States	31 May 1998	1998	
Triple jump	15.35 m (+1.7 m/s)	Yulimar Rojas	Venezuela	16 September 2023	2023	
Shot put	20.94 m	Chase Jackson	United States	5 July 2025	2025	
Discus throw	70.68 m	Valarie Allman	United States	5 July 2025	2025	
Hammer throw	78.88 m DLR NR	Camryn Rogers	Canada	5 July 2025	2025	
Javelin throw	67.70 m	Christina Obergföll	Germany	31 May 2013	2013	
