= Notturna di Milano =

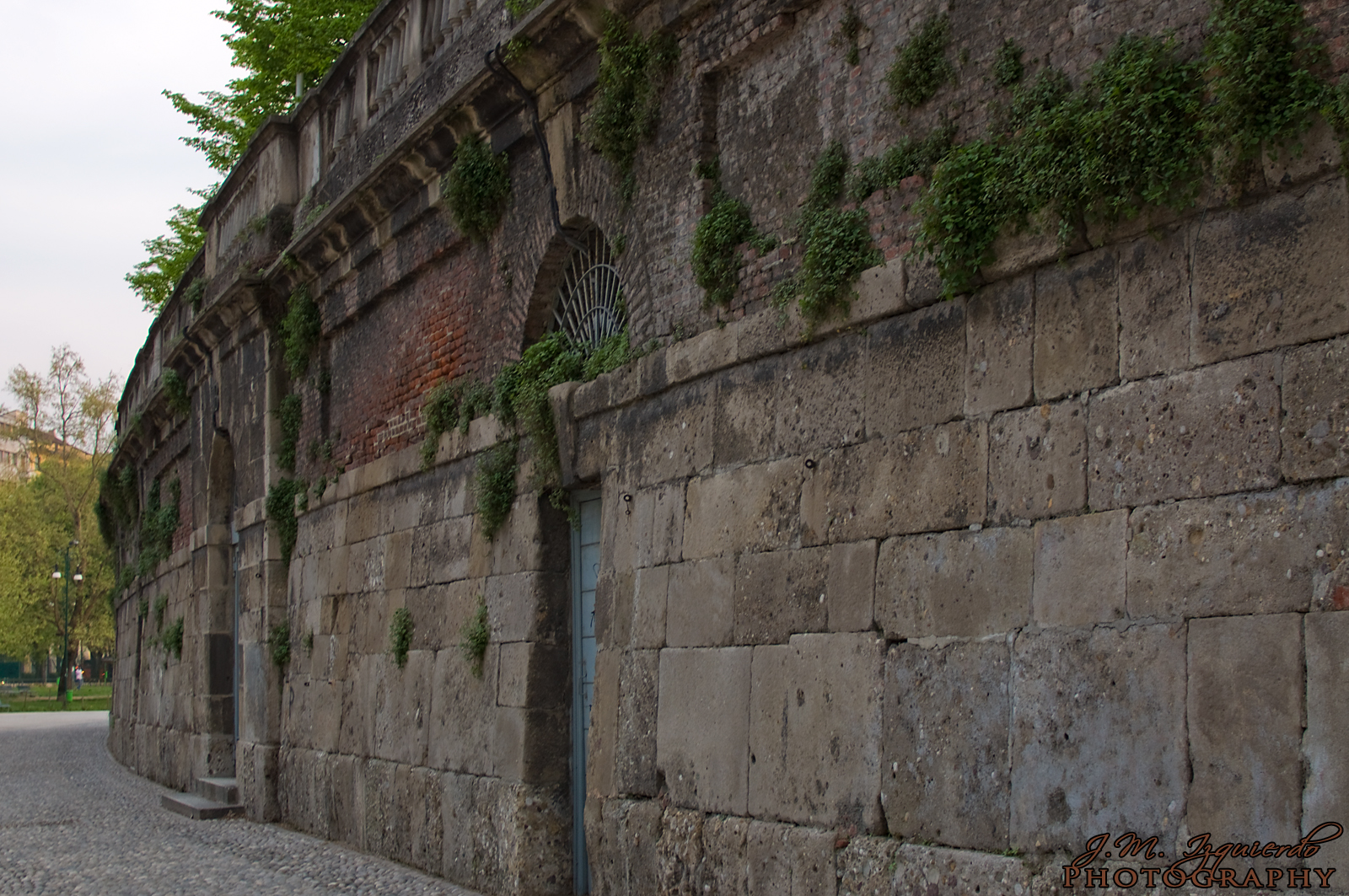
- The facade of the Arena Civica, the host stadium
- Date: September
- Location: Milan, Italy
- Event type: Track and field
- Established: 1998
- Website: Notturna di Milano

Notturna di Milano (English: Night in Milan) is an annual track and field meeting which is held in September at the Arena Civica in Milan, Italy. First held in 1998, the meeting received IAAF permit meeting status the following year. In its earlier years, men's sprinting was one of the primary attractions of the meeting, with former world record holders Donovan Bailey and Tim Montgomery among those competing.

The third edition of the meeting attracted many prominent athletes including Olympic champion Haile Gebrselassie and World Champion sprinter Dennis Mitchell (world record holder Maurice Greene was also set to compete but withdrew due to illness). Home athlete Fabrizio Donato set a historic national record of 17.60 m in the triple jump (an improvement of Paolo Camossi's mark by almost a third of a metre). That same year, the meeting also had a failed drugs test – Mihaela Melinte, the world record holder in the women's hammer throw and favourite for the Olympic title that year, was banned for two years for taking nandrolone. The 2002 meeting attracted numerous Olympic and World medallists.

The event was cancelled in 2006 and the Milan venue was the setting for the 2007 European Cup instead. The meeting returned to the European athletics calendar in 2008 and was highlighted by performances from Italians Elisa Cusma and Antonietta Di Martino, and also a national record run by Bahraini sprinter Roqaya Al-Gassra. The competition gained European Athletics meeting permit status in 2009. That year's events were dedicated to the memory of Candido Cannavò (former editor of Gazzetta dello Sport) who had played an integral part in the inception of the meeting. The meeting organisers also allocated the profits of the ticket sales towards those affected by the 2009 L'Aquila earthquake.

Emerging French sprinter Christophe Lemaitre was one of the prime attractions of the 2010 (given his North Italian heritage) and reigning World Champion Caster Semenya improved the 800 metres meeting record. In addition to the competitive action, Stefano Baldini – the 2004 Olympic marathon champion – was presented with the Candido Cannavò Award for his athletics achievements.

== World records ==
Over the course of its history, two world records have been set at the Notturna di Milano.

World records set at the Notturna di Milano
Year	Event	Record	Athlete	Nationality
1939, July	800 m	1:46.6 h	Rudolf Harbig	(Germany) German Reich
1973, 27 June	800 m	1:43.7 h	Marcello Fiasconaro	Italy

== Meeting records ==
=== Men ===
Men's meeting records of the Notturna di Milano
Event	Record	Athlete	Nationality	Date	Ref.	Video
100 m	10.08	Bernard Williams	United States			
200 m	20.30 (+0.5 m/s)	Andrew Howe	Italy	9 September 2010		
400 m	44.83	Leonard Byrd	United States			
800 m	1:43.50	Mohammed Aman	Ethiopia	18 September 2011		
1500 m	3:31.34	Hicham El Guerrouj	Morocco			
3000 m	7:41.30	Augustine Choge	Kenya	18 September 2011		
5000 m	12:52.53	Salah Hissou	Morocco			
3000 m steeplechase	8:11.31	Stephen Cherono	Qatar			
110 m hurdles	13.18	Colin Jackson	Great Britain			
400 m hurdles	48.22	Chris Rawlinson	Great Britain			
High jump	2.28 m	Aleksandr Shustov	Russia			
Pole vault	5.70 m	Rens Blom	Netherlands			
Triple jump	17.67 (+3.1 m/s)	Jonathan Edwards	Great Britain			
Shot put	20.37 m	Yuriy Bilonoh	Ukraine			
Discus throw	67.13 m	Virgilijus Alekna	Lithuania			
Hammer throw	80.38 m	Nicola Vizzoni	Italy			
Javelin throw	80.84 m	Vítězslav Veselý	Czechoslovakia	18 September 2011		
5000 m walk (track)	18:38.45	Ivano Brugnetti	Italy			
4 × 100 m relay	38.69	Francesco Scuderi; Alessandro Cavallaro; Maurizio Checcucci; Andrea Colombo	Italy			

=== Women ===
Women's meeting records of the Notturna di Milano
Event	Record	Athlete	Nationality	Date	Ref.	Video
100 m	11.12	Roqaya Al-Gassra	Bahrain			
200 m	22.63	Debbie Ferguson	Bahamas			
400 m	50.44	Katharine Merry	Great Britain			
800 m	1:58.16	Caster Semenya	South Africa	9 September 2010		
1500 m	4:04.01	Nancy Langat	Kenya			
5000 m	14:36.92	Berhane Adere	Ethiopia			
100 m hurdles	12.79	Nevin Yanıt	Turkey			
400 m hurdles	54.51	Nezha Bidouane	Morocco			
2000 m steeplechase	6:04.46	Dorcus Inzikuru	Uganda			
3000 m steeplechase	9:22.29	Justyna Bąk	Poland			
High jump	2.01 m	Monica Iagăr	Romania			
Pole vault	4.61 m	Svetlana Feofanova	Russia			
Long jump	7.07 m	Fiona May	Italy			
Triple jump	14.34 m	Fiona May	Italy			
Shot put	20.02 m	Vita Pavlysh	Ukraine			
Discus throw	65.94 m	Natalya Sadova	Russia			
Hammer throw	72.54 m	Mihaela Melinte	Romania			
2000 m walk (track)	7:56.58	Panforova	Russia			
3000 m walk (track)	11:57.80	Erica Alfridi	Italy			
4 × 100 m relay	?	Francesca Cola; Daniela Graglia; Manuela Grillo; Manuela Levorato	Italy			

== See also ==
- Golden Gala
- Rieti Meeting
- Memorial Primo Nebiolo
