= Vardinoyiannia =

Defunct track and field meeting in Greece

- Date: June/July
- Location: Rethymno, Greece
- Event type: Track and field
- Established: 1985
- Website: Vardinoyiannia

The Vardinoyiannia (Greek: Βαρδινογιάννεια) was an annual one-day outdoor track and field meeting at the Rethymno Municipal Sports Centre in Rethymno, Greece. First held in 1985, it was held in June or July each year until 2012, when the meeting folded due to financial reasons. It was part of the European Athletics permit meeting from 2000. It held permit meeting status on the IAAF World Athletics Tour from 2006 to 2009.

Osleidys Menéndez set a women's javelin throw world record at the meeting 2001, achieving a distance of 71.54 m (234 ft 8 1/2 in). This record lasted for four years before Menéndez improved her own mark. The competition was the venue of Usain Bolt's competitive debut over the 100 metres in 2007.

The competition was named after the Vardinogiannis family.
