= Helsinki Grand Prix =

Annual one-day track and field meeting

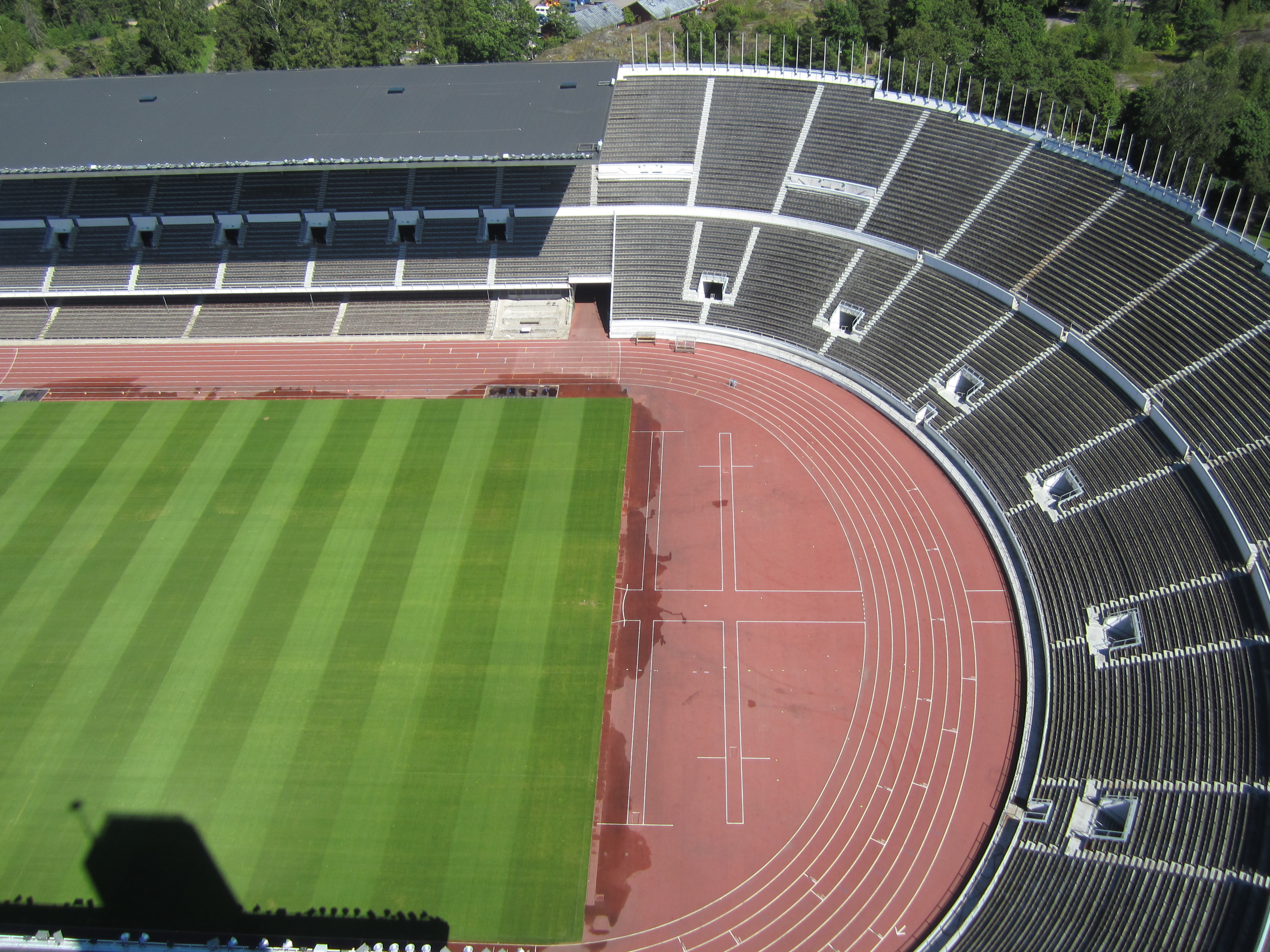
- The host venue – Helsinki Olympic Stadium
- Location: Helsinki, Finland
- Event type: Track and field
- Established: 1959
- Last held: 2006

The Helsinki Grand Prix (Finnish: Maailmankisat, World Games in English) was an annual one-day outdoor track and field meeting held at the Helsinki Olympic Stadium in Helsinki, Finland. Established in 1959, it was originally organised by a local athletics club, Helsingin Kisa-Veikot (HKV). It continued in this format, with Apu magazine a key sponsor, for nearly three decades. In 1987, HKV came to an agreement where the Finnish Amateur Athletic Association took on the operating costs of the competition. The Finnish Association ceased this arrangement in 1992, causing the cancellation of the 1993 meeting due to financial difficulties.

Following the successful hosting the 1994 European Athletics Championships in Helsinki, the meeting was rebooted and incorporated into the annual IAAF Grand Prix series upon that competition's founding in 1998. It continued to be a high-level meeting for international athletes, and was again included the top bracket upon the creation of the IAAF World Athletics Tour in 2005. During this period it had title sponsors and was known as the Ericsson Grand Prix (1998–2000), Asics Grand Prix (2001–2004) and GE Money Grand Prix (2005–2006). However, the 2006 meeting proved to be its last and the meeting folded in 2007.

== Best athlete prize ==
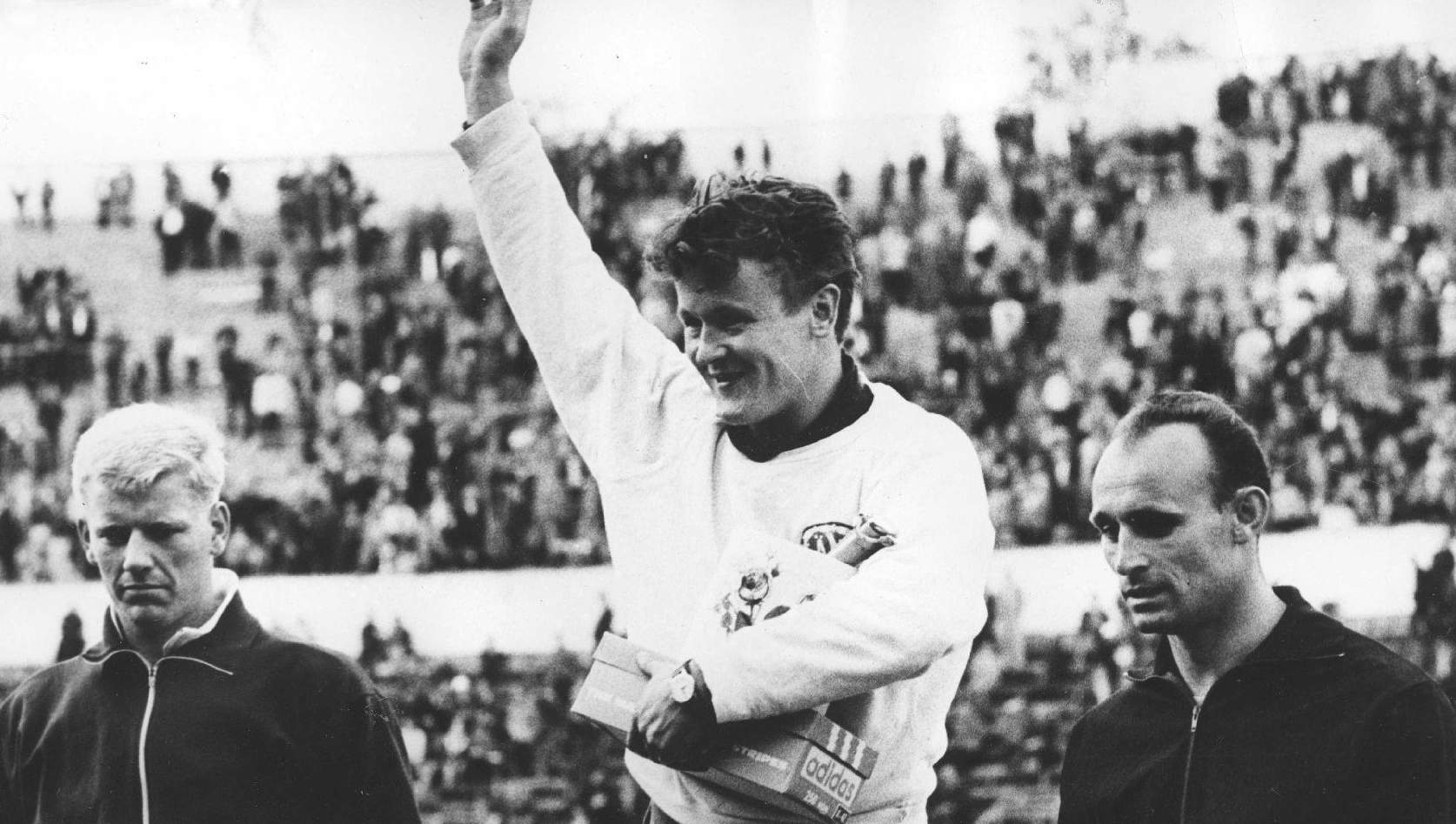
Jorma Kinnunen on the javelin podium at the 1965 meeting

At each competition, the best athlete of the meet would be presented with a sculpted glass prize.

- 1959 Gert Potgieter – 400 metres hurdles
- 1961 Jay Silvester – discus throw
- 1963 Pentti Eskola – long jump
- 1965 Ron Clarke – 5000 metres
- 1967 Judy Pollock – 800 metres
- 1969 Jorma Kinnunen – javelin
- 1971 Ralph Mann – 400 metres hurdles
- 1973 Ben Jipcho – 3000 metres steeplechase
- 1975 Bronisław Malinowski – 3000 metres steeplechase
- 1976 Seppo Hovinen – javelin
- 1977 Samson Kimobwa – 3000 metres steeplechase
- 1978 Henry Rono – 3000 metres steeplechase
- 1979 Renaldo Nehemiah – 110 metres hurdles
- 1980 Mac Wilkins – discus throw
- 1981 Brian Oldfield – shot put
- 1982 Tiina Lillak – javelin
- 1983 Arto Bryggare – 110 metres hurdles
- 1984 Igor Nikulin – hammer throw
- 1985 Willie Banks – triple jump
- 1986 Tom Petranoff – javelin
- 1987 Saïd Aouita – mile run
- 1988 Oleg Protsenko – triple jump
- 1989 Salvatore Antibo – 10 000 metres
- 1990 Hollis Conway – high jump
- 1991 Noureddine Morceli – 1 500 metres
- 1992 Seppo Räty – javelin
- 1994 Merlene Ottey – 100 metres
- 1995 Geir Moen – 200 metres
- 1996 Frankie Fredericks – 100 metres
- 1997 Trine Hattestad – javelin
- 1998 Haile Gebrselassie – 5000 metres
- 1999 Marion Jones – 200 metres

== Meet records ==
=== Men ===
Men's meeting records of the Helsinki Grand Prix
| Event | Record | Athlete | Nationality | Date | Ref. |
|---|---|---|---|---|---|
| 100 m | 9.87 | Frankie Fredericks | Namibia | | |
| 200 m | 20.14 | Ato Boldon | Trinidad and Tobago | | |
| 200 m | 20.14 | Obadele Thompson | Barbados | | |
| 400 m | 44.53 | Mark Richardson | United Kingdom | | |
| 800 m | 1:43.97 | Mbulaeni Mulaudzi | South Africa | | |
| 1500 m | 3:31.00 | Noureddine Morceli | Algeria | | |
| 3000 m | 7:26.03 | Haile Gebrselassie | Ethiopia | | |
| 5000 m | 12:39.36 | Haile Gebrselassie | Ethiopia | | |
| 10,000 m | 27:16.50 | Salvatore Antibo | Italy | | |
| 3000 m steeplechase | 8:10.15 | Moses Kiptanui | Kenya | | |
| 110 m hurdles | 13.12 | Colin Jackson | United Kingdom | | |
| 400 m hurdles | 48.06 | Ruslan Mashchenko | Russia | | |
| High jump | 2.37 m | Hollis Conway | United States | | |
| Pole vault | 5.90 m | Riaan Botha | South Africa | | |
| Long jump | 8.44 m | Dwight Phillips | United States | | |
| Triple jump | 17.82 m | Jonathan Edwards | United Kingdom | | |
| Shot put | 22.47 m | Werner Günthör | Switzerland | | |
| Discus throw | 70.98 m | Mac Wilkins | United States | | |
| Hammer throw | 84.14 m | Yuriy Sedykh | Soviet Union | | |
| Javelin throw | 89.98 m | Sergey Makarov | Russia | | |
| 4 × 100 m relay | 38.38 | | Trinidad and Tobago | | |

=== Women ===
Men's meeting records of the Helsinki Grand Prix
| Event | Record | Athlete | Nationality | Date | Ref. |
|---|---|---|---|---|---|
| 100 m | 10.86 | Marion Jones | United States | | |
| 200 m | 21.91 | Marion Jones | United States | | |
| 400 m | 50.39 | DeeDee Trotter | United States | | |
| 800 m | 1:57.10 | Sigrun Wodars | East Germany | | |
| 1500 m | 4:02.9 | Tatyana Kazankina | Soviet Union | | |
| 3000 m | 8:40.72 | Maricica Puică | Romania | | |
| 5000 m | 14:52.66 | Fernanda Ribeiro | Portugal | | |
| 10,000 m | 31:00.64 | Kayoko Fukushi | Japan | | |
| 100 m hurdles | 12.66 | Damu Cherry | United States | | |
| 400 m hurdles | 54.05 | Sandra Farmer-Patrick | United States | | |
| High jump | 2.00 m | Stefka Kostadinova | Bulgaria | | |
| Pole vault | 4.50 m | Svetlana Feofanova | Russia | | |
| Long jump | 7.09 m | Inessa Kravets | Ukraine | | |
| Triple jump | 15.05 m | Trecia-Kaye Smith | Jamaica | | |
| Shot put | 20.63 m | Natalya Lisovskaya | Soviet Union | | |
| Discus throw | 65.82 m | María Cristina Betancourt | Cuba | | |
| Hammer throw | 69.19 m | Olga Kuzenkova | Russia | | |
| Javelin throw | 68.47 m | Osleidys Menéndez | Cuba | | |
| 4 × 100 m relay | 42.65 | | United States | | |
