= Gugl Games =

Austrian track and field meet

- Location: Linzer Stadion, Austria
- Event type: Track and field
- Established: 1988

The Gugl Games, formerly known as the Gugl-Meeting and the Zipfer Grand Prix, is the largest one-day athletics meet in Austria, and is held at the Linzer Stadion in Linz. Founded in 1988 the Gugl-Meeting was an IAAF Grand Prix-status event from 1994 onwards and has changed to EAA Premium status in 2006. Many major athletic stars have participated in the Gugl-Meeting, including Carl Lewis, Colin Jackson, Allen Johnson, Marion Jones, Iván Pedroso, Maria de Lurdes Mutola, Javier Sotomayor. The Linz track is famous for fast 100-m sprint and excellent long jump performances.

On 20 August 2006, Israeli newspaper Ynet revealed that the competition had not accepted European Pole vaulting champion, Aleksandr Averbukh, due to his Israeli nationality.

After a four-year hiatus, the meet restarted under its new name in 2012 and was held over two days. The 2015 edition was cancelled.

== Meet records ==
=== Men ===
Men's meeting records of the Gugl Games
Event	Record	Athlete	Nationality	Date	Ref.
100 m	9.94	Davidson Ezinwa	Nigeria		
200 m	20.66	Mike Rodgers	United States	26 August 2013	
400 m	44.46	Kirani James	Grenada	20 August 2012	
800 m					
1000 m	2:16.39	Seurei Benson	Kenya	20 August 2012	
3000 m	7:46.39	Bernard Lagat	United States	26 August 2013	
110 m hurdles	13.09 (±0.0 m/s)	Sergej Shubenkov	Russia	20 August 2012	
400 m hurdles	48.13	Felix Sanchez	Dominican Republic	20 August 2012	
High jump					
Pole vault	5.63 m	Valentin Lavillenie	France	26 August 2013	
Long jump	8.66 m	Iván Pedroso	Cuba		
Triple jump					
Shot put					
Discus throw	65.22 m	Gerd Kanter	Estonia	20 August 2012	

=== Women ===
Women's meeting records of the Gugl Games
Event	Record	Athlete	Nationality	Date	Ref.
100 m	11.14 (−1.0 m/s)	Barbara Pierre	United States	26 August 2013	
400 m	50.92	Natasha Hastings	United States	26 August 2013	
1000 m	2:39.86	Malika Akkaoui	Morocco	26 August 2013	
1500 m					
100 m hurdles	12.82 (−0.1 m/s)	Sally Pearson	Australia	26 August 2013	
400 m hurdles	55.01	Dalilah Muhammad	Australia	26 August 2013	
3000 m steeplechase	9:23.52	Lydia Chepkurui	Kenya	20 August 2012	
High jump					
Pole vault					
Long jump	6.36 (±0.0 m/s)	Jazmin Sawyers	Great Britain	26 August 2013	
Triple jump					
Shot put					

== See also ==
- Gugl Indoor Meeting
