= Josef Odložil Memorial =

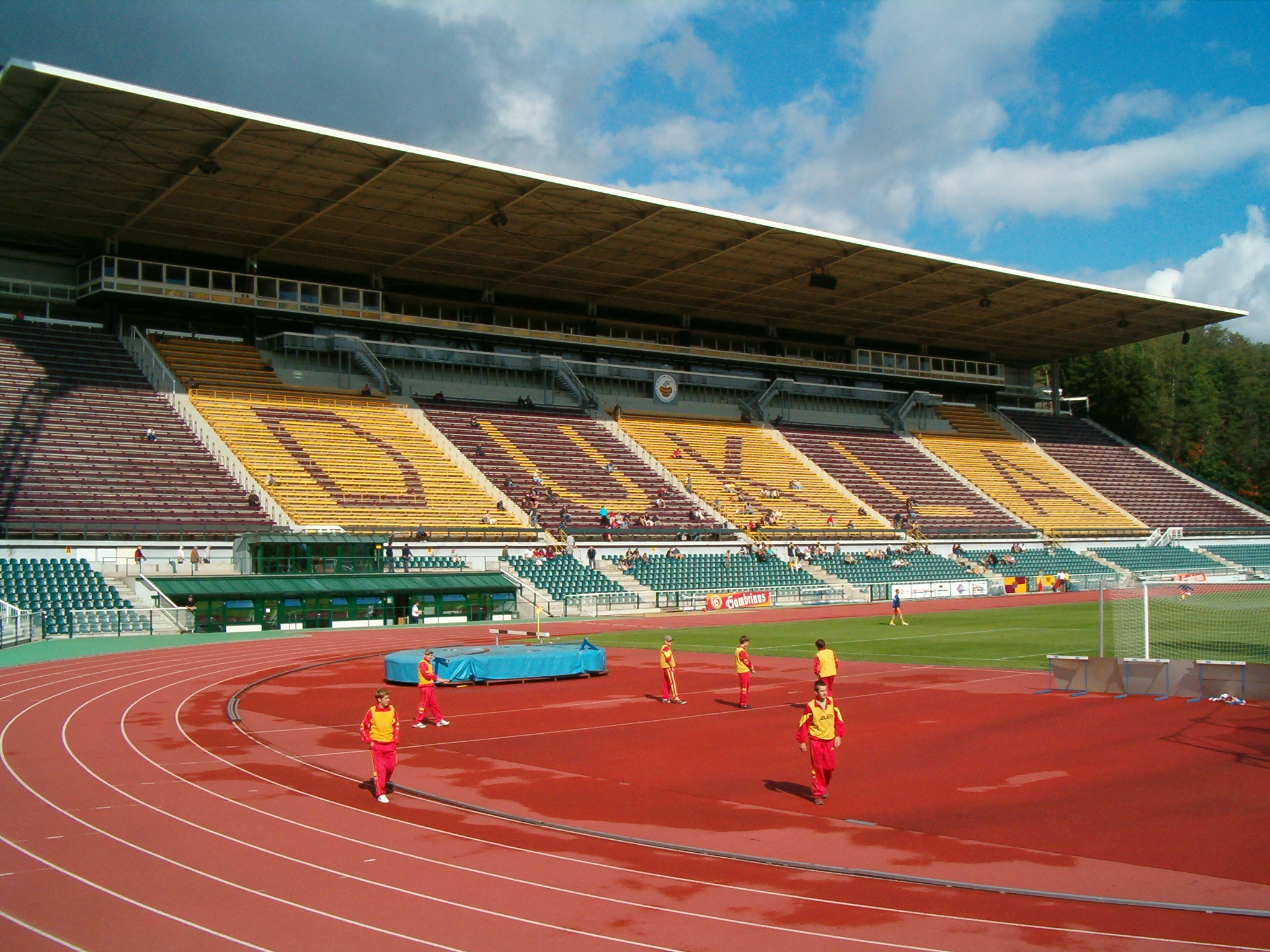
- The host stadium
- Date: May
- Location: Prague, Czech Republic
- Event type: Track and field
- Established: 1994
- Website: memorial-odlozil.cz

The Josef Odložil Memorial (Czech: Memoriál Josefa Odložila) is an annual track and field meeting which takes place in June at Stadion Juliska (until 2001 at Stadion Evžena Rošického) in Prague, Czech Republic.

The competition was first held in 1994 as a race over 2000 m in memory of Czech middle-distance runner Josef Odložil – a silver medallist over 1500 metres at the 1964 Summer Olympics, who died in 1993. The programme expanded to a wider selection of track and field events the following year. The meet grew in stature, attracting a number of top-class international competitors, and by 2004 it had gained IAAF Grand Prix status and was broadcast on television by Eurosport. In 2011, it was selected as an "Outdoor Premium Meeting" by the European Athletics Association.

A memorial race over 1500 m is now held in honour of Odložil and features among the list of events at the meeting.

== Meet records ==
=== Men ===
Men's meeting records of the Josef Odložil Memorial
Event	Record	Athlete	Nationality	Date	Ref.
100 m	9.92 (+1.7 m/s)	Mike Rodgers	United States	4 June 2018	
200 m	20.36 (+0.3 m/s)	Danny Talbot	Jamaica	9 June 2014	
400 m	45.09 (Note: Noted as 45.11 on the official meeting records page.)	Baboloki Thebe	Botswana	3 June 2019	
400 m	44.42	Blake Leeper (Note: Leeper is a double amputee paralympic athlete.)	United States	4 June 2018	
800 m	1:44.46	Robert Chirchir	Kenya	12 June 1996	
1500 m	3:32.32	Sadik Mikhou	Bahrain	5 June 2017	
2000 m	4:57.72	Daniel Komen	Kenya	14 June 1999	
5000 m	13:33.67	Daniel Kipchirchir Komen	Kenya	9 June 2014	
10,000 m	26:57.27	Sileshi Sihine	Ethiopia	27 June 2005	
110 m hurdles	13.11 (+1.8 m/s)	Antonio Alkana	South Africa	5 June 2017	
400 m hurdles	48.47	Seamus Derbyshire	United Kingdom	2 June 2025	
3000 m steeplechase	8:14.32	Collins Kosgei	Kenya	13 June 2007	
High jump	2.31 m	Jaroslav Bába	Czechoslovakia	13 June 2011	
Pole vault	5.82 m	Raphael Holzdeppe	Germany	10 June 2013	
Pole vault	5.82 m	Piotr Lisek	Poland	9 June 2014	
Pole vault	5.82 m	Thibaut Collet	France	6 June 2022	
Long jump	8.60 m	Iván Pedroso	Cuba	10 June 1997	
Triple jump	17.21 m	Yoandri Betanzos	Cuba	17 June 2002	
Shot put	22.31 m	Ryan Crouser	United States	4 June 2018	
Discus throw	63.38 m	Vaclavas Kidykas	Lithuania	12 June 1996	
Hammer throw	84.86 m	Koji Murofushi	Japan	29 June 2003	
Javelin throw	90.56 m	Jan Železný	Czechoslovakia	5 June 2000	
4 × 100 m relay	38.67	Zdeněk Stromšík; Polák; Jan Jirka; Hampl	Czech Republic	7 June 2021	

=== Women ===
Women's meeting records of the Josef Odložil Memorial
Event	Record	Athlete	Nationality	Date	Ref.
100 m	11.34	Vida Anim	Ghana	28 June 2004	
200 m	22.67 (+1.2 m/s)	Christine Mboma	Namibia	7 June 2021	
400 m	50.87	Helena Fuchsová	Czechoslovakia	5 June 2000	
800 m	1:58.83	Irina Mistyukevich	Russia	14 June 1999	
1500 m	4:05.66	Irina Biryukova	Russia	10 June 1997	
3000 m	8:47.42	Berhane Adere	Ethiopia	5 June 2000	
5000 m	15:21.32	Bouchra Chaâbi	Morocco	28 June 2004	
100 m hurdles	12.69 (+1.0 m/s)	Elvira Herman	Belarus	4 June 2018	
400 m hurdles	54.04	Georganne Moline	United States	4 June 2018	
3000 m steeplechase	9:20.33	Dorcus Inzikuru	Uganda	27 June 2005	
High jump	2.01 m	Yelena Slesarenko	Russia	28 June 2004	
Pole vault	4.76 m	Silke Spiegelburg	Germany	11 June 2012	
Long jump	6.75 m	Tünde Vaszi	Hungary	10 June 1997	
Triple jump	14.83 m	Yelena Oleynikova	Russia	17 June 2002	
Shot put	19.94 m	Christina Schwanitz	Germany	10 June 2013	
Discus throw	66.81 m	Věra Pospíšilová-Cechlová	Czechoslovakia	27 June 2005	
Hammer throw	73.98 m	Malwina Kopron	Poland	5 June 2017	
Javelin throw	68.81 m	Barbora Špotáková	Czechoslovakia	16 June 2008	
5000 m walk	29:18.1	Pavla Choděrová	Czechoslovakia	2 August 1994	
4 × 100 m relay	43.83	Marika Popowicz; Weronika Wedler; Ptak; Opoń	Poland	10 June 2013	
