= Memorial Primo Nebiolo =

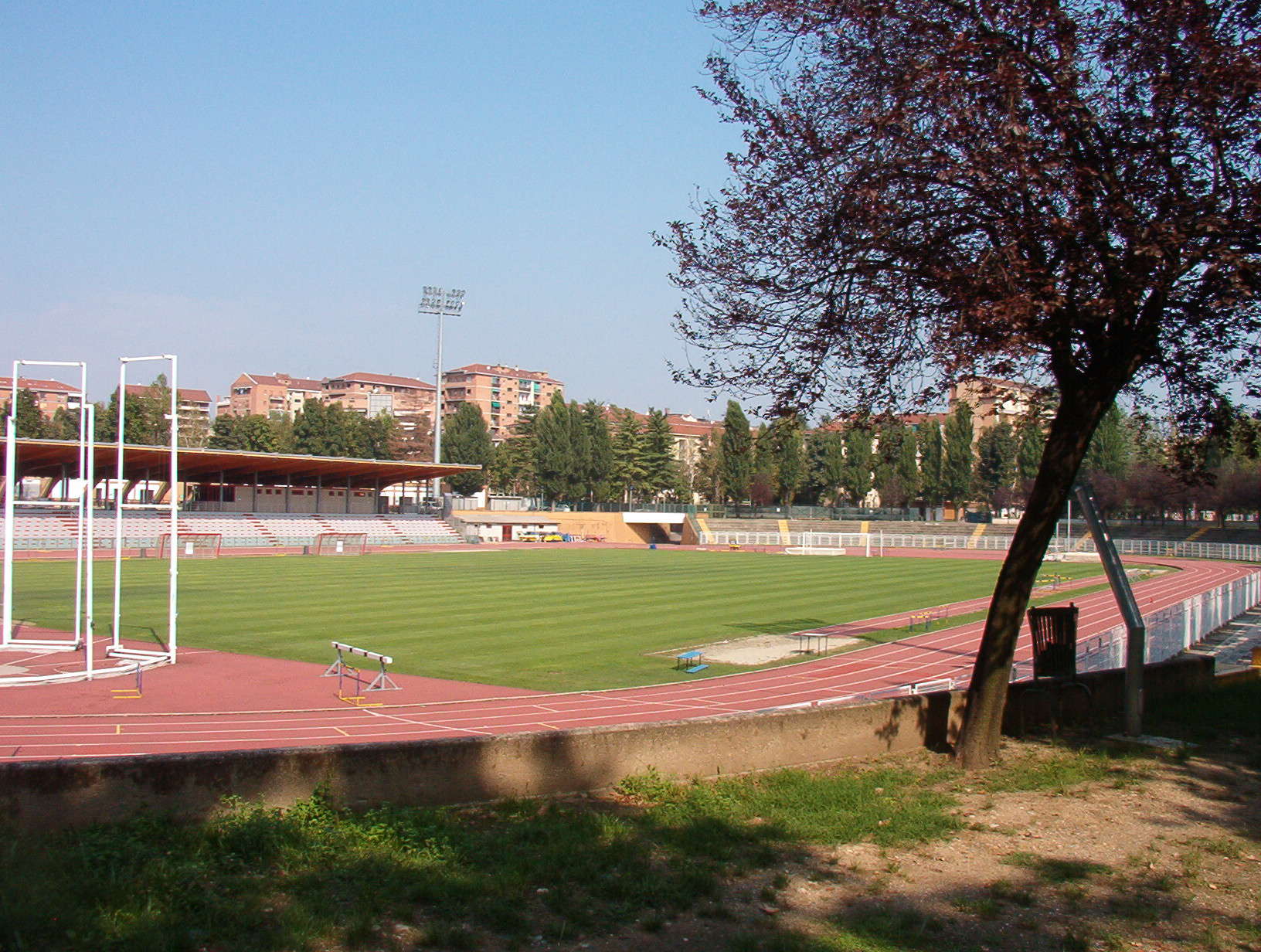
- The host stadium in Turin
- Date: Early June
- Location: Turin, Italy
- Event type: Track and field
- Established: 1995
- Website: Memorial Primo Nebiolo at the Wayback Machine (archived 2012-11-30)

The Memorial Primo Nebiolo is an annual track and field meeting held at the Stadio Primo Nebiolo in Turin, Italy in early June.

== History ==
The history of the Turin competition dates back to 1963, when the Torino Meeting was first held. This event hosted top level athletes, such as Sebastian Coe and Saïd Aouita, for two decades until its cancellation in 1983. A re-boot occurred in 1995 with the launch of the Meeting Internazionale di Atletica Leggera Città di Torino and it quickly became part of the IAAF Grand Prix circuit. Following the death of the highly influential Italian sports administrator Primo Nebiolo (a former IAAF President who was born in the city), the competition was renamed in his honour in 2000 as the Memorial Primo Nebiolo.

The meeting is currently part of the European Athletics Outdoor Premium Meetings series.

== Meet records ==
=== Men ===
Men's meeting records of the Memorial Primo Nebiolo
Event	Record	Athlete	Nationality	Date	Ref.
100 m	10.08	Bernard Williams	United States	2001	
200 m	20.29	Brian Dzingai	Zimbabwe	2007	
400 m	44.77	Davis Kamoga	Uganda	1997	
800 m	1:43.48	Abubaker Kaki	Sudan	12 June 2010	
1500 m	3:31.92	Amine Laalou	Sudan	10 June 2011	
5000 m	13:12.46	Daniel Salel	Kenya	12 June 2010	
110 m hurdles	13.08	Dayron Robles	Cuba	12 June 2010	
High jump	2.31	Troy Kemp	Bahamas	1998	
High jump	2.31	Vyacheslav Voronin	Russia	1999	

=== Women ===
Women's meeting records of the Memorial Primo Nebiolo
Event	Record	Athlete	Nationality	Date	Ref.
100 m	11.08	Marion Jones	United States	1997	
200 m	22.35	Veronica Campbell-Brown	Jamaica	2005	
400 m	50.45	Charity Opara	Nigeria	1998	
400 m	50.45	Lorraine Fenton	Jamaica	2003	
800 m	1:59.00	Yuneisy Santiusty	Cuba	2011	
1500 m	4:08.24	Siham Hilali	Morocco	12 June 2010	
100 m hurdles	12.64 (−0.8 m/s)	Queen Harrison	United States	8 June 2013	
High jump	2.02 m	Kajsa Bergqvist	Sweden	2007	
High jump	2.02 m	Antonietta Di Martino	Italy	2007	
Triple jump	15.00 m	Tatyana Lebedeva	Russia	2006	
Shot put	19.56 m	Natallia Mikhnevich	Belarus	2009	

== See also ==
- Golden Gala
- Notturna di Milano
- Rieti Meeting
