= Golden Grand Prix Osaka =

Event of light athletics

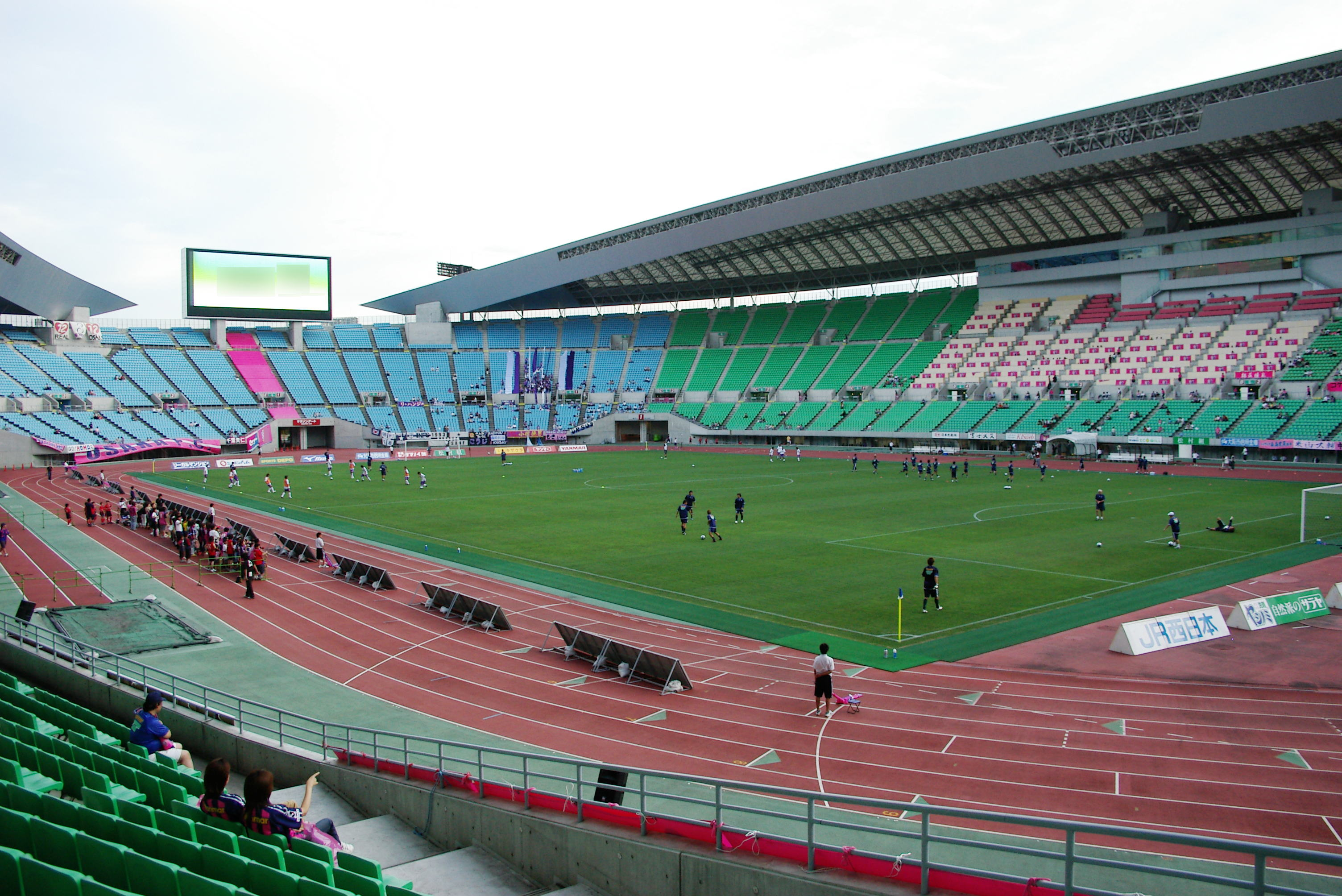
- Nagai Stadium
- Date: May
- Location: Osaka, Japan
- Event type: Track and field
- Established: 1996
- Last held: 2010

The Golden Grand Prix Osaka is an international athletics competition in Osaka, Japan, held in May at the Yanmar Stadium Nagai, since 2018 under its current name. From 1996 to 2010 the event was known as the Osaka Grand Prix. Formerly part of the IAAF Grand Prix (2005–2009) and the IAAF World Challenge (2010), it was replaced in 2011 by the Golden Grand Prix Kawasaki, but the Golden Grand Prix returned to Osaka in 2018.

== Meeting records ==
=== Men ===
Men's meeting records of the Golden Grand Prix Osaka
Event	Record	Athlete	Nationality	Date	Ref.
100 m	9.91 (−0.4 m/s)	Maurice Greene	United States	13 May 2000	
200 m	19.84 (−0.4 m/s)	Michael Norman	United States	19 May 2019	
400 m	44.02	Jeremy Wariner	United States	5 May 2007	
800 m	1:46.53	Jeff Riseley	Australia	10 May 2008	
1500 m	3:34.14	Japheth Kimutai	Kenya	13 May 2000	
Mile	3:51.30	Noureddine Morceli	Algeria	11 May 1996	
5000 metres	13:03.51	Daniel Komen	Kenya	10 May 1997	
3000 m steeplechase	8:17.31	Wesley Kiprotich	Kenya	7 May 2005	
110 m hurdles	13.06 (−1.2 m/s)	Liu Xiang	China	8 May 2004	
400 m hurdles	47.60	Bershawn Jackson	United States	6 May 2006	
High jump	2.30 m	Lee Jin-Taek	South Korea	11 May 1996	
High jump	2.30 m	Daigo Naoyuki	Japan	5 May 2007	
Pole vault	5.75 m	Dmitri Markov	Australia	7 May 2005	
Pole vault	5.75 m	Brad Walker	United States	7 May 2005	
Pole vault	5.75 m	Paul Burgess	Australia	6 May 2006	
Long jump	8.49 m (+1.9 m/s)	Savante Stringfellow	United States	11 May 2002	
Triple jump	17.01 m (±0.0 m/s)	Kenta Bell	United States	10 May 2003	
Shot put	21.61 m	John Godina	United States	9 May 1998	
Discus throw	65.12 m	Jason Tunks	Canada	12 May 2001	
Hammer throw	82.95 m	Koji Murofushi	Japan	10 May 2003	
Javelin throw	90.60 m	Jan Železný	Czechoslovakia	11 May 1996	
4 × 100 m relay	38.00	Shuhei Tada; Ryota Yamagata; Yuki Koike; Yoshihide Kiryu	Japan	19 May 2019	

=== Women ===
Men's meeting records of the Golden Grand Prix Osaka
Event	Record	Athlete	Nationality	Date	Ref.
100 m	10.79 (−0.6 m/s)	Marion Jones	United States	9 May 1998	
200 m	22.55 (+0.5 m/s)	Ivet Lalova-Collio	Bulgaria	19 May 2019	
400 m	50.04	Falilat Ogunkoya	Nigeria	13 May 2000	
800 m	2:01.79	Charmaine Howell	Jamaica	12 May 2001	
1500 m	4:03.51	Sarah Jamieson	Australia	6 May 2006	
5000 metres	14:58.14	Lucy Wangui Kabuu	Kenya	6 May 2006	
110 m hurdles	12.71 (−0.0 m/s)	Sally McLellan	Australia	6 May 2006	
400 m hurdles	53.85	Deon Hemmings	United States	10 May 1997	
High jump	2.02 m	Stefka Kostadinova	Bulgaria	10 May 1997	
Pole vault	4.45 m	Emma George	Australia	9 May 1998	
Pole vault	4.45 m	Melinda Owen	United States	8 May 2010	
Long jump	6.86 m (+1.6 m/s)	Kumiko Ikeda	Japan	6 May 2006	
Triple jump	14.72 m (+0.5 m/s)	Sarka Kasparkova	Czechoslovakia	10 May 1997	
Shot put	18.93 m	Valerie Adams	New Zealand	10 May 2003	
Discus throw	63.68 m	Xiao Yanling	China	10 May 1997	
Hammer throw	75.27 m	Wang Zheng	China	19 May 2019	
Javelin throw	65.66 m	Mikaela Ingberg	Finland	11 May 1996	
4 × 100 m relay	42.93			4 July 2009	
4 × 400 m relay	3:28.97			4 July 2009	
