= Athens Grand Prix Tsiklitiria =

- Date: June–July
- Location: Athens, Greece
- Event type: Track and field
- Established: 1963
- Website: Athens Grand Prix Tsiklitiria

The Athens Grand Prix Tsiklitiria is an annual athletics event at the Olympic Stadium in Athens, Greece, as part of the IAAF World Challenge Meetings. It was first organized in 1963, held at the Panathinaiko Stadium. Its name honours Kostas Tsiklitiras, who won four olympic medals at the 1908 and 1912 Olympic Games in long jump and high jump, both from standing position.

== History ==
From 2003 to 2009 IAAF classified the Athens Grand Prix Tsiklitiria among IAAF Grand Prix meetings.

== World records ==
Over the course of its history, two world records has been set at the Athens Grand Prix Tsiklitiria, for the same event and furthermore, the first (of 1999 edition) being surpassed by the latter (2005) on a technicality. The technicality is Tim Montgomery's intervening 2002 world record (9.78) was later disallowed due to Montgomery's suspension for using performance-enhancing drugs.

World records set at the Athens Grand Prix Tsiklitiria
Year	Event	Record	Athlete	Nationality
1999	100 m	9.79 (+0.1 m/s)	Maurice Greene	United States
2005	100 m	9.77 (+1.6 m/s)	Asafa Powell	Jamaica

== Meeting records ==
=== Men ===
Men's meeting records of the Athens Grand Prix Tsiklitiria
Event	Record	Athlete	Nationality	Date	Ref.
100 m	9.77 (+1.6 m/s)	Asafa Powell	Jamaica	14 June 2005	
200 m	19.67 (−0.5 m/s)	Usain Bolt	Jamaica	13 July 2008	
400 m	44.54	LaShawn Merritt	United States	13 July 2009	
800 m	1:43.42	Yuriy Borzakovskiy	Russia	2006	
1000 m	2:15.53	Noah Ngeny	Kenya	2000	
1500 m	3:30.27	Daniel Komen Kipchirchir	Kenya	2006	
3000 m	7:31.96	Daniel Komen Kipchirchir	Kenya	2000	
5000 m	12:59.34	Sammy Kipketer	Kenya	2001	
110 m hurdles	13.04	Dayron Robles	Cuba	13 July 2008	
400 m hurdles	48.00	Bershawn Jackson	United States	2006	
3000 m steeplechase	7:56.32	Saif Saaeed Shaheen	Qatar	2006	
High jump	2.37 m	Stefan Holm	Sweden	13 July 2008	
Pole vault	6.05 m	Maksim Tarasov	Russia	1999	
Long jump	8.44 m	Dwight Phillips	United States	2003	
Long jump	8.44 m (+0.2 m/s)	Louis Tsatoumas	Greece	13 July 2008	
Triple jump	17.52 m (+0.9 m/s)	Marian Oprea	Romania	14 June 2005	
Shot put	21.27 m	Al Feuerbach	United States	1974	
Discus throw	70.43 m	Virgilijus Alekna	Lithuania	2 July 2007	
Hammer throw	81.71 m	Andriy Skvaruk	Ukraine	2002	
Javelin throw	89.93 m	Sergey Makarov	Russia	1999	
4 × 100 m relay	39.17	Team Greece	Greece	14 June 2005	

=== Women ===
Men's meeting records of the Athens Grand Prix Tsiklitiria
Event	Record	Athlete	Nationality	Date	Ref.
100 m	10.92	Ekaterini Thanou	Greece	1999	
100 m	10.92 (±0.0 m/s)	Veronica Campbell-Brown	Jamaica	13 July 2008	
200 m	22.10	Inger Miller	United States	1999	
400 m	49.59	Katharine Merry	United Kingdom	2001	
800 m	1:57.70	Larisa Mikhaylova	Russia	1999	
1500 m	3:56.74	Yelena Soboleva	Russia	2006	
3000 m	8:33.07	Dong Yanmei	China	2000	
5000 m	15:30.06	Merima Denboba	Ethiopia	1998	
100 m hurdles	12.63	Glory Alozie	Spain	2002	
400 m hurdles	53.02	Lashinda Demus	United States	2006	
3000 m steeplechase	9:01.59	Gulnara Samitova	Russia	2004	
High jump	2.00 m	Kajsa Bergqvist	Sweden	2006	
Pole vault	4.88 m	Svetlana Feofanova	Russia	2004	
Long jump	7.03 m	Fiona May	Italy	1998	
Triple jump	15.34 m (−0.5 m/s)	Tatyana Lebedeva	Russia	2004	
Shot put	19.68 m	Nadezhda Ostapchuk	Belarus	13 July 2009	
Discus throw	68.31 m	Nicoleta Grasu	Romania	2001	
Javelin throw	67.99 m	Osleidys Menéndez	Cuba	2004	
