= 2019 Golden Gala =

- Dates: 6 June 2019
- Host city: Rome, Italy
- Venue: Stadio Olimpico
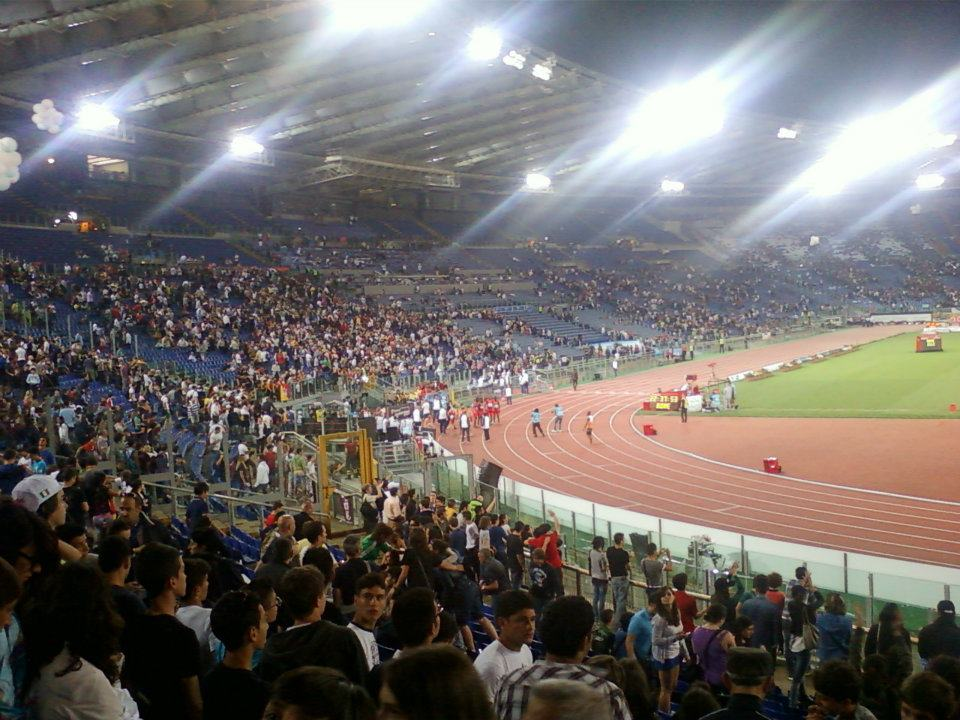
- Level: 2019 IAAF Diamond League
- Events: 27 (14 Diamond League)

The 2019 Golden Gala was the 39th edition of the annual outdoor track and field meeting in Rome, Italy. Held on 6 June at the Stadio Olimpico, it was the fourth leg of the 2019 IAAF Diamond League – the highest level international track and field circuit. 27 events total were contested with 14 of them being point-scoring Diamond League disciplines.

A total of seven world leads and two meeting records were set at the competition. In the men's sprints, 400 metres world leader Michael Norman won in a meeting record and world leading time of 19.72 seconds in the 200 metres race, narrowly holding onto a shrinking lead ahead of reigning Diamond League champion Noah Lyles who placed second in a seasonal debut of 19.72 seconds. Norman's time was a personal best and broke Lyles' winning streak that went back to the 2016 US Olympic Trials.

In the men's distance events, Donavan Brazier passed Nijel Amos less than a meter before the finish line in the 800 metres race, winning in a world leading 1:43.63 ahead of Amos' 1:43.65. Benjamin Kigen won a close race with Getnet Wale in the 3000 metres steeplechase, setting a personal best and world leading time of 8:06.13 ahead of Wale's 8:06.83, also a personal best. In a fast 5000 metres race in which six competitors finished in less than 12:59 and 18 personal or seasonal bests were achieved, Telahun Haile Bekele narrowly defeated reigning Diamond League champion Selemon Barega in a personal best and world leading 12:52.98. Barega finished second in a seasonal best of 12:53.04.

The shot put meeting record was broken by Konrad Bukowiecki with a personal best mark of 21.97 metres, and the world leading mark in the high jump of 2.31 metres was matched by Bohdan Bondarenko.

On the women's side, a Swedish record was set in the pole vault by Angelica Bengtsson with a mark of 4.76 metres, defeating indoor world champion Sandi Morris who placed second jointly with Robeilys Peinado (4.66 metres). The 2016 Olympic champion over 100 metres and 200 metres, Elaine Thompson, came back from a slower start in the 100 metres race to defeat Dina Asher-Smith in the fastest time in the world since 2017, 10.89 seconds. Asher-Smith, who had defeated Thompson in the Stockholm Diamond League over 200 metres earlier that year, took second with a seasonal debut of 10.94 seconds.

In the 1500 metres, Genzebe Dibaba ran her fastest time since setting the world record in 2015, narrowly holding off Laura Muir with a world leading 3:56.28. Muir herself ran the second fastest time in her career, 3:56.73, only behind her British record to place second. Malaika Mihambo defeated Olympic champion jumpers Brittney Reese and Caterine Ibargüen in the long jump with a personal best and world leading 7.07 metres, her first mark seven metres or more.

== Diamond League results ==
Athletes competing in the Diamond League disciplines earned extra compensation and points which went towards qualifying for one of two Diamond League finals (either Zürich or Brussels depending on the discipline). First place earned 8 points, with each step down in place earning one less point than the previous, until no points are awarded in 9th place or lower.

=== Men ===
200 m (+0.7 m/s)
Place	Athlete	Time	Points
1	Michael Norman (USA)	19.70 WL MR PB	8 (+8)
2	Noah Lyles (USA)	19.72	7 (+7)
3	Álex Quiñónez (ECU)	20.17	18 (+6)
4	Ramil Guliyev (TUR)	20.35	20 (+5)
5	Filippo Tortu (ITA)	20.36	4 (+4)
6	Jereem Richards (TTO)	20.52	14 (+3)
7	Bernardo Baloyes (COL)	20.59	6 (+2)
8	Nethaneel Mitchell-Blake (GBR)	20.68	4 (+1)
9	Leon Reid (IRL)	20.83	2

800 m
Place	Athlete	Time	Points
1	Donavan Brazier (USA)	1:43.63 WL	14 (+8)
2	Nijel Amos (BOT)	1:43.65	15 (+7)
3	Brandon McBride (CAN)	1:43.90	6 (+6)
4	Ferguson Cheruiyot Rotich (KEN)	1:44.11	5 (+5)
5	Clayton Murphy (USA)	1:44.59	4 (+4)
6	Wyclife Kinyamal (KEN)	1:44.65	4 (+3)
7	Adam Kszczot (POL)	1:44.74	4 (+2)
8	Marcin Lewandowski (POL)	1:45.32	1 (+1)
9	Andreas Kramer (SWE)	1:45.33	0
10	Abubaker Haydar Abdalla (QAT)	1:45.53	5
DNF (PM)	Harun Abda (USA)	Did not finish (pace maker)	0

5000 m
Place	Athlete	Time	Points
1	Telahun Haile Bekele (ETH)	12:52.98 WL PB	12 (+8)
2	Selemon Barega (ETH)	12:53.04	14 (+7)
3	Hagos Gebrhiwet (ETH)	12:54.92	12 (+6)
4	Birhanu Balew (BHR)	12:56.26 PB	10 (+5)
5	Abadi Hadis (ETH)	12:56.48	4 (+4)
6	Mohammed Ahmed (CAN)	12:58.16 PB	3 (+3)
7	Edward Zakayo Pingua (KEN)	13:03.19 PB	2 (+2)
8	Andrew Butchart (GBR)	13:09.33	1 (+1)
9	Yemaneberhan Crippa (ITA)	13:09.52 PB	0
10	Justyn Knight (CAN)	13:09.76 PB	0
11	Ben True (USA)	13:09.81	0
12	Bethwell Birgen (KEN)	13:10.21	0
13	Davis Kiplangat (KEN)	13:11.65 PB	0
14	Filip Ingebrigtsen (NOR)	13:11.75 PB	0
15	Aron Kifle (ERI)	13:13.85	0
16	Oscar Chelimo (UGA)	13:20.10 PB	0
17	Paul Kipngetich Tanui (KEN)	13:23.13	0
18	Milkesa Mengesha (ETH)	13:25.74 PB	0
19	Nick Willis (NZL)	13:56.94	0
DNF (PM)	Youssouf Hiss Bachir (DJI)	Did not finish (pace maker)	0
DNF (PM)	Vincent Letting (KEN)	Did not finish (pace maker)	0

100 m hurdles (+0.4 m/s)
Place	Athlete	Time	Points
1	Sergey Shubenkov (RUS)	13.26	14 (+8)
2	Andrew Pozzi (GBR)	13.29	10 (+7)
3	Antonio Alkana (RSA)	13.30	7 (+6)
4	Gabriel Constantino (BRA)	13.50	5 (+5)
4	Milan Trajkovic (CYP)	13.50	7 (+5)
6	Aurel Manga (FRA)	13.51	3 (+3)
7	Lorenzo Perini (ITA)	13.58	2 (+2)
8	Johnathan Cabral (CAN)	13.61	1 (+1)
9	Orlando Ortega (ESP)	14.00	5

High jump
Place	Athlete	Mark	Points
1	Bohdan Bondarenko (UKR)	2.31 m =WL	8 (+8)
2	Majd Eddin Ghazal (SYR)	2.28 m	9 (+7)
3	Maksim Nedasekau (BLR)	2.28 m	13 (+6)
4	Gianmarco Tamberi (ITA)	2.28 m	5 (+5)
5	Ilya Ivanyuk (RUS)	2.28 m	10 (+4)
6	Brandon Starc (AUS)	2.22 m	8 (+3)
7	Andriy Protsenko (UKR)	2.22 m	2 (+2)
8	Mateusz Przybylko (GER)	2.19 m	1 (+1)
9	Takashi Eto (JPN)	2.19 m	0
10	Django Lovett (CAN)	2.19 m	0
11	Naoto Tobe (JPN)	2.15 m	0
NM	Bryan McBride (USA)	No mark	0

Triple jump
Place	Athlete	Mark	Points
1	Omar Craddock (USA)	17.50 m (+0.5 m/s)	8 (+8)
2	Pedro Pablo Pichardo (POR)	17.47 m (−0.6 m/s)	7 (+7)
3	Donald Scott (USA)	17.43 m (−0.5 m/s) PB	6 (+6)
4	Hugues Fabrice Zango (BUR)	17.30 m (−0.5 m/s) PB	5 (+5)
5	Nazim Babayev (AZE)	17.06 m (+0.2 m/s)	4 (+4)
6	Andy Díaz (CUB)	17.00 m (+0.4 m/s)	3 (+3)
7	Chris Benard (USA)	16.88 m (−0.6 m/s)	2 (+2)
8	Alexis Copello (AZE)	16.74 m (−0.7 m/s)	1 (+1)
9	Zhu Yaming (CHN)	16.73 m (−0.4 m/s)	0
10	Nelson Évora (POR)	16.69 m (−0.5 m/s)	0
11	Pablo Torrijos (ESP)	16.25 m (−0.1 m/s)	0

Shot put
Place	Athlete	Mark	Points
1	Konrad Bukowiecki (POL)	21.97 m MR PB	9 (+8)
2	Darrell Hill (USA)	21.71 m	12 (+7)
3	Darlan Romani (BRA)	21.68 m	12 (+6)
4	Joe Kovacs (USA)	21.46 m	8 (+5)
5	Michał Haratyk (POL)	21.26 m	8 (+4)
6	O'Dayne Richards (JAM)	20.93 m	3 (+3)
7	Tim Nedow (CAN)	20.57 m	2 (+2)
8	Chukwuebuka Enekwechi (NGR)	20.54 m	1 (+1)
9	Curtis Jensen (USA)	19.84 m	
10	Tomáš Staněk (CZE)	19.66 m	2
11	Leonardo Fabbri (ITA)	19.36 m	

=== Women ===
100 m (+0.6 m/s)
Place	Athlete	Time	Points
1	Elaine Thompson (JAM)	10.89 WL	14 (+8)
2	Dina Asher-Smith (GBR)	10.94	7 (+7)
3	Aleia Hobbs (USA)	11.12	14 (+6)
4	Marie-Josée Ta Lou (CIV)	11.14	5 (+5)
5	Jenna Prandini (USA)	11.17	8 (+4)
6	Vitória Cristina Rosa (BRA)	11.22	8 (+3)
7	Shania Collins (USA)	11.34	2 (+2)
8	Ángela Tenorio (ECU)	11.38	1 (+1)
9	English Gardner (USA)	11.42	0

400 m
Place	Athlete	Time	Points
1	Salwa Eid Naser (BHR)	50.26	16 (+8)
2	Shericka Jackson (JAM)	51.05	7 (+7)
3	Stephenie Ann McPherson (JAM)	51.39	11 (+6)
4	Jessica Beard (USA)	51.55	9 (+5)
5	Justyna Święty-Ersetic (POL)	52.04	6 (+4)
6	Kendall Ellis (USA)	52.09	3 (+3)
7	Lisanne de Witte (NED)	52.17 (.161)	5 (+2)
8	Courtney Okolo (USA)	52.17 (.164)	1 (+1)
9	Raphaela Boaheng Lukudo (ITA)	52.98	0

1500 m
Place	Athlete	Time	Points
1	Genzebe Dibaba (ETH)	3:56.28 WL	8 (+8)
2	Laura Muir (GBR)	3:56.73	7 (+7)
3	Gudaf Tsegay (ETH)	3:59.26	13 (+6)
4	Jenny Simpson (USA)	4:01.18	5 (+5)
5	Gabriela DeBues-Stafford (CAN)	4:01.28 PB	4 (+4)
6	Eilish McColgan (GBR)	4:02.29	3 (+3)
7	Elinor Purrier (USA)	4:02.34 PB	2 (+2)
8	Axumawit Embaye (ETH)	4:02.26	4 (+1)
9	Rababe Arafi (MAR)	4:03.25	8
10	Winny Chebet (KEN)	4:03.86	2
11	Alemaz Samuel (ETH)	4:04.43	1
12	Lemlem Hailu (ETH)	4:04.78 PB	0
13	Marta Pérez (ESP)	4:07.14	0
14	Claudia Bobocea (ROU)	4:07.61	0
15	Dawit Seyaum (ETH)	4:18.78	5
DNF (PM)	Emily Cherotich Tuei (KEN)	Did not finish (pace maker)	0
DNF (PM)	Noélie Yarigo (BEN)	Did not finish (pace maker)	0

400 m hurdles
Place	Athlete	Time	Points
1	Dalilah Muhammad (USA)	53.67	16 (+8)
2	Shamier Little (USA)	54.40	7 (+7)
3	Zuzana Hejnová (CZE)	54.82	6 (+6)
4	Kori Carter (USA)	55.09	5 (+5)
5	Janieve Russell (JAM)	55.42	9 (+4)
6	Anna Ryzhykova (UKR)	55.64	9 (+3)
7	Sage Watson (CAN)	55.71	2 (+2)
8	Ayomide Folorunso (ITA)	55.99	1 (+1)
9	Léa Sprunger (SUI)	56.36	0

Pole vault
Place	Athlete	Mark	Points
1	Angelica Bengtsson (SWE)	4.76 m NR	8 (+8)
2	Sandi Morris (USA)	4.66 m	12 (+7)
2	Robeilys Peinado (VEN)	4.66 m	7 (+7)
4	Yarisley Silva (CUB)	4.66 m	5 (+5)
5	Katie Nageotte (USA)	4.66 m	8 (+4)
5	Katerina Stefanidi (GRE)	4.66 m	12 (+4)
7	Ninon Guillon-Romarin (FRA)	4.56 m	2 (+2)
7	Anzhelika Sidorova (RUS)	4.56 m	2 (+2)
9	Li Ling (CHN)	4.56 m	7
10	Nikoleta Kiriakopoulou (GRE)	4.56 m	7
11	Sonia Malavisi (ITA)	4.31 m	0
NM	Angelica Moser (SUI)	No mark	0
NM	Jenn Suhr (USA)	No mark	0

Long jump
Place	Athlete	Mark	Points
1	Malaika Mihambo (GER)	7.07 m (+0.5 m/s) WL PB	8 (+8)
2	Caterine Ibargüen (COL)	6.87 m (−1.4 m/s)	15 (+7)
3	Brittney Reese (USA)	6.76 m (+1.5 m/s)	6 (+6)
4	Yelena Sokolova (RUS)	6.68 m (+0.1 m/s)	5 (+5)
5	Maryna Bekh-Romanchuk (UKR)	6.64 m (+0.2 m/s)	11 (+4)
6	Ivana Španović (SRB)	6.62 m (−1.8 m/s)	3 (+3)
7	Nastassia Mironchyk-Ivanova (BLR)	6.59 m (−0.1 m/s)	2 (+2)
8	Éloyse Lesueur-Aymonin (FRA)	6.39 m (+0.5 m/s)	1 (+1)
9	Shara Proctor (GBR)	6.30 m (±0.0 m/s)	1
10	Laura Strati (ITA)	6.27 m (+1.6 m/s)	0
11	Chantel Malone (IVB)	6.27 m (−0.8 m/s)	0
12	Lorraine Ugen (GBR)	6.23 m (±0.0 m/s)	5

Javelin throw
Place	Athlete	Mark	Points
1	Lü Huihui (CHN)	66.47 m	16 (+8)
2	Eda Tuğsuz (TUR)	64.51 m	7 (+7)
3	Līna Mūze (LAT)	63.72 m	13 (+6)
4	Kara Winger (USA)	63.11 m	5 (+5)
5	Christin Hussong (GER)	63.02 m	10 (+4)
6	Nikola Ogrodníková (CZE)	62.02 m	7 (+3)
7	Barbora Špotáková (CZE)	61.51 m	2 (+2)
8	Tatsiana Khaladovich (BLR)	61.32 m	1 (+1)
9	Martina Ratej (SLO)	57.96 m	0
10	Liu Shiying (CHN)	57.37 m	0
11	Zahra Bani (ITA)	56.95 m	0
12	Sara Jemai (ITA)	55.32 m	0

== Non-Diamond League results ==
=== Men ===
Event	First		Second		Third	
400 m hurdles	Rai Benjamin (USA)	47.58	David Kendziera (USA)	48.99	Takatoshi Abe (JPN)	49.57
3000 m steeplechase	Benjamin Kigen (KEN)	8:06.13 WL PB	Getnet Wale (ETH)	8:06.83 PB	Chala Beyo (ETH)	8:09.95
Masters 100 m	Andrea Benatti (ITA)	11.40	Emanuele Brunelli (ITA)	11.65	Walter Comper (ITA)	11.70
Masters 400 m	Ivan Mancinelli (ITA)	51.21	Massimiliano Poeta (ITA)	52.45	Alberto Cipriani (ITA)	53.14
Masters mile	Davide Raineri (ITA)	4:13.96	Francesco Nadalutti (ITA)	4:29.37	Riccardo Lerda (ITA)	4:32.98
Paralympic 100 m	Mattia Carda (ITA)	12.28	Valeriano Augusto Ravasio Nanque (ITA)	12.38	Niccolò Pirosu (ITA)	12.61
Fisdir 100 m	Andrea Piacentini (ITA)	13.97	Luca Mancioli (ITA)	14.23	Tiziano Capitani (ITA)	14.78

=== Women ===
Event	First		Second		Third	
Masters 100 m	Serena Caravelli (ITA)	12.90	Denise Caroline Neumann (ITA)	12.91	Maria Ruggeri (ITA)	13.35
Masters 400 m	Veronica Marchesini (ITA)	1:01.02	Cristina Sanulli (ITA)	1:01.77	Paola Bassano (ITA)	1:06.39
Masters mile	Alessandra Lena (ITA)	5:31.81	Simona Prunea (ITA)	5:32.21	Chiara Vulcan (ITA)	5:32.42
Paralympic 100 m	Antonella Inga (ITA)	13.88	Arjola Dedaj (ITA)	13.92	Marianna Agostini (ITA)	14.44
Fisdir 100 m	Chiara Zeni (ITA)	16.28	Chiara Statzu (ITA)	17.31	Sara Spano (ITA)	17.47

=== Mixed ===
Event	First		Second		Third	
12×200 m relay	Municipio X	5:29.42	Rieti	5:34.55	Florence	5:46.81

== See also ==
- 2019 Weltklasse Zürich (first half of the Diamond League final)
- 2019 Memorial Van Damme (second half of the Diamond League final)
