= 2019 Birmingham Grand Prix =

- Dates: 18 August 2019
- Host city: Birmingham
- Venue: Alexander Stadium
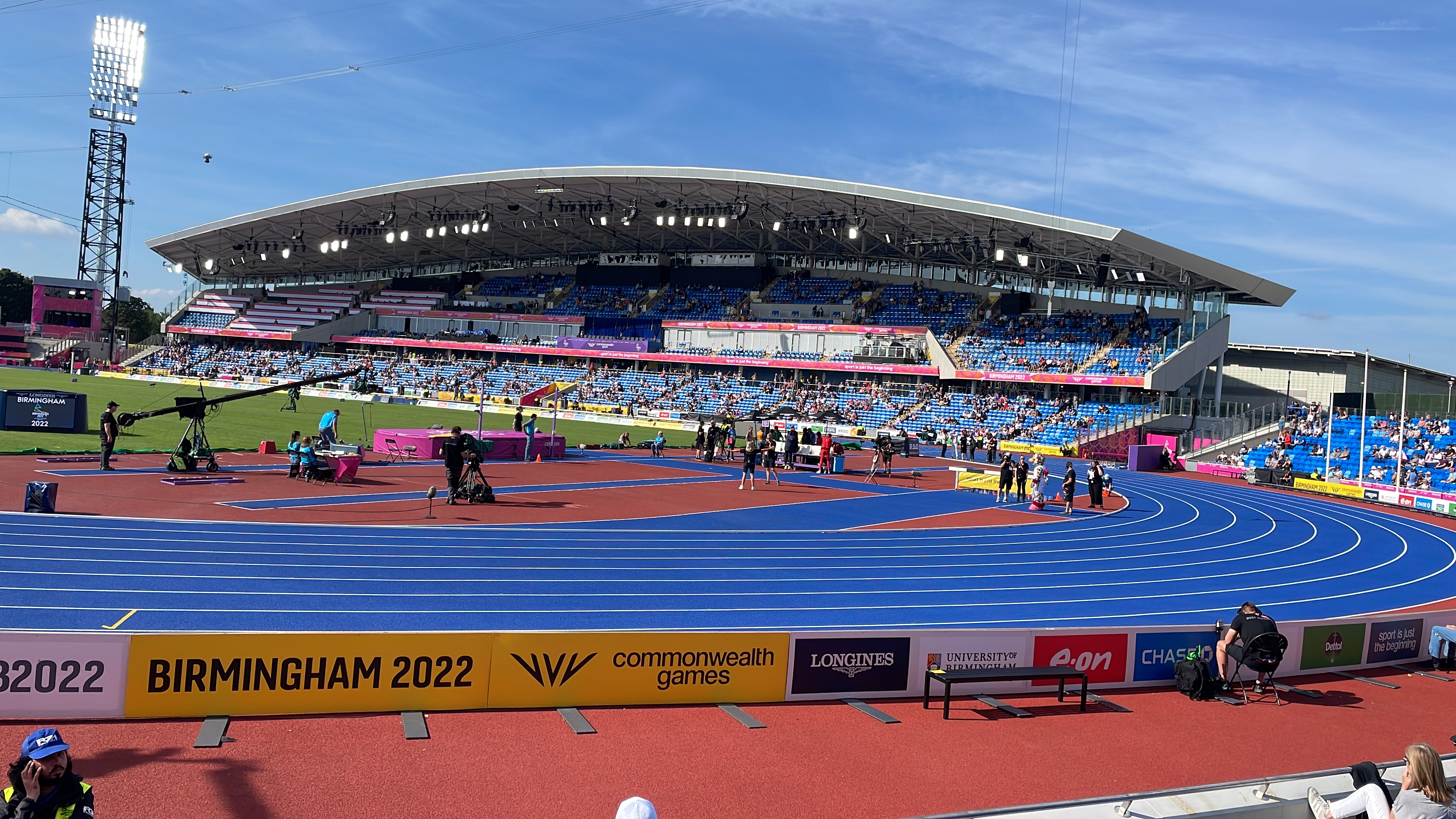
- Level: 2019 IAAF Diamond League

The 2019 Birmingham Grand Prix was the 29th edition of the annual outdoor track and field meeting in Birmingham. Held on 18 August at Alexander Stadium, it was the eleventh leg of the 2019 IAAF Diamond League – the highest level international track and field circuit.

The meeting was highlighted by victories from Shaunae Miller-Uibo and future world champion Danielle Williams, as well as Konstanze Klosterhalfen's win and German national record in the women's mile.

== Diamond League results ==
Athletes competing in the Diamond League disciplines earned extra compensation and points which went towards qualifying for one of two Diamond League finals (either Zürich or Brussels depending on the discipline). First place earned 8 points, with each step down in place earning one less point than the previous, until no points are awarded in 9th place or lower.

=== Diamond Discipline ===
Men's 100m (+2.0 m/s)
Place	Athlete	Country	Time	Points
1st place, gold medalist(s)	Yohan Blake	Jamaica	10.07	8
2nd place, silver medalist(s)	Adam Gemili	Great Britain	10.07	7
3rd place, bronze medalist(s)	Mike Rodgers	United States	10.09	6
4	Christopher Belcher	United States	10.13	5
5	Andre De Grasse	Canada	10.13	4
6	Tyquendo Tracey	Jamaica	10.14	3
7	Akani Simbine	South Africa	10.15	2
8	Xie Zhenye	China	10.17	1

Men's 100m Round 1
Place	Athlete	Country	Time	Heat
1	Adam Gemili	Great Britain	10.08	1
2	Christopher Belcher	United States	10.09	1
3	Andre De Grasse	Canada	10.14	1
4	Akani Simbine	South Africa	10.15	1
5	Mike Rodgers	United States	10.16	2
6	Yohan Blake	Jamaica	10.18	2
7	Tyquendo Tracey	Jamaica	10.19	1
8	Xie Zhenye	China	10.19	2
9	Arthur Cissé	Ivory Coast	10.29	2
10	Yuki Koike	Japan	10.31	1
11	Cameron Burrell	United States	10.36	1
12	Su Bingtian	China	10.36	2
13	Harry Aikines-Aryeetey	Great Britain	10.37	1
14	Romell Glave	Jamaica	10.42	2
15	Oliver Bromby	Great Britain	10.44	2
16	Demek Kemp	United States	10.44	2

Men's 400m
Place	Athlete	Country	Time	Points
1st place, gold medalist(s)	Akeem Bloomfield	Jamaica	45.04	8
2nd place, silver medalist(s)	Obi Igbokwe	United States	45.53	7
3rd place, bronze medalist(s)	Matthew Hudson-Smith	Great Britain	45.55	6
4	Kahmari Montgomery	United States	45.59	5
5	Michael Cherry	United States	45.61	4
6	Demish Gaye	Jamaica	45.64	3
7	Vernon Norwood	United States	45.79	2
8	Nathon Allen	Jamaica	46.90	1

Men's 400mH
Place	Athlete	Country	Time	Points
1st place, gold medalist(s)	Yasmani Copello	Turkey	49.08	8
2nd place, silver medalist(s)	Alison dos Santos	Brazil	49.20	7
3rd place, bronze medalist(s)	David Kendziera	United States	49.29	6
4	Kemar Mowatt	Jamaica	49.56	5
5	Thomas Barr	Ireland	50.16	4
6	Takatoshi Abe	Japan	50.36	3
7	Jacob Paul	Great Britain	50.71	2
8	Amere Lattin	United States	51.15	1

Men's High Jump
Place	Athlete	Country	Mark	Points
1st place, gold medalist(s)	Brandon Starc	Australia	2.30 m	8
2nd place, silver medalist(s)	Ilya Ivanyuk	Authorised Neutral Athletes	2.23 m	7
3rd place, bronze medalist(s)	Mathew Sawe	Kenya	2.23 m	6
4	Wang Yu	China	2.23 m	5
5	Majd Eddin Ghazal	Syria	2.23 m	4
6	Chris Baker	Great Britain	2.19 m	3
7	Naoto Tobe	Japan	2.19 m	2
8	Jeron Robinson	United States	2.19 m	1
	Tom Gale	Great Britain	NM	

Men's Javelin Throw
Place	Athlete	Country	Mark	Points
1st place, gold medalist(s)	Cheng Chao-tsun	Chinese Taipei	87.75 m	8
2nd place, silver medalist(s)	Jakub Vadlejch	Czech Republic	85.78 m	7
3rd place, bronze medalist(s)	Magnus Kirt	Estonia	85.29 m	6
4	Andreas Hofmann	Germany	82.47 m	5
5	Marcin Krukowski	Poland	81.02 m	4
6	Edis Matusevičius	Lithuania	80.58 m	3
7	Thomas Röhler	Germany	80.30 m	2
8	Bernhard Seifert	Germany	78.00 m	1
9	Keshorn Walcott	Trinidad and Tobago	72.94 m	

Women's 200m (+0.4 m/s)
Place	Athlete	Country	Time	Points
1st place, gold medalist(s)	Shaunae Miller-Uibo	Bahamas	22.24	8
2nd place, silver medalist(s)	Dina Asher-Smith	Great Britain	22.36	7
3rd place, bronze medalist(s)	Shelly-Ann Fraser-Pryce	Jamaica	22.50	6
4	Dafne Schippers	Netherlands	22.81	5
5	Blessing Okagbare	Nigeria	22.83	4
6	Dezerea Bryant	United States	22.84	3
7	Payton Chadwick	United States	23.71	2
8	Marie-Josée Ta Lou	Ivory Coast	24.18	1

Women's 800m
Place	Athlete	Country	Time	Points
1st place, gold medalist(s)	Ajeé Wilson	United States	2:00.76	8
2nd place, silver medalist(s)	Lynsey Sharp	Great Britain	2:01.09	7
3rd place, bronze medalist(s)	Raevyn Rogers	United States	2:01.40	6
4	Rénelle Lamote	France	2:01.46	5
5	Alexandra Bell	Great Britain	2:02.41	4
6	Natoya Goule	Jamaica	2:02.70	3
7	Kate Grace	United States	2:03.19	2
8	Halimah Nakaayi	Uganda	2:03.40	1
9	Olha Lyakhova	Ukraine	2:03.64	
10	Morgan Mitchell	Australia	2:04.14	
	Aneta Lemiesz	Poland	DNF	

Women's Mile
Place	Athlete	Country	Time	Points
1st place, gold medalist(s)	Konstanze Klosterhalfen	Germany	4:21.11	8
2nd place, silver medalist(s)	Gabriela DeBues-Stafford	Canada	4:22.47	7
3rd place, bronze medalist(s)	Eilish McColgan	Great Britain	4:24.71	6
4	Linden Hall	Australia	4:24.72	5
5	Jessica Hull	Australia	4:24.93	4
6	Jemma Reekie	Great Britain	4:27.00	3
7	Elle Purrier St. Pierre	United States	4:30.30	2
8	Axumawit Embaye	Ethiopia	4:30.36	1
9	Heather MacLean	United States	4:31.13	
10	Helen Schlachtenhaufen	United States	4:35.70	
11	Claudia Bobocea	Romania	4:37.67	
12	Sarah Healy	Ireland	4:40.72	
13	Sofia Ennaoui	Poland	4:45.69	
	Chanelle Price	United States	DNF	

Women's 100mH (−0.2 m/s)
Place	Athlete	Country	Time	Points
1st place, gold medalist(s)	Danielle Williams	Jamaica	12.46	8
2nd place, silver medalist(s)	Kendra Harrison	United States	12.66	7
3rd place, bronze medalist(s)	Tobi Amusan	Nigeria	12.71	6
4	Nia Ali	United States	12.73	5
5	Janeek Brown	Jamaica	12.79	4
6	Brianna Rollins-McNeal	United States	12.90	3
7	Payton Chadwick	United States	12.92	2
8	Tiffani McReynolds	United States	13.16	1

Women's 100mH Round 1
Place	Athlete	Country	Time	Heat
1	Danielle Williams	Jamaica	12.53	2
2	Tobi Amusan	Nigeria	12.71	2
3	Brianna Rollins-McNeal	United States	12.72	2
4	Nia Ali	United States	12.81	1
5	Payton Chadwick	United States	12.86	1
6	Janeek Brown	Jamaica	12.88	1
7	Kendra Harrison	United States	12.93	1
8	Tiffani McReynolds	United States	12.96	2
9	Nadine Visser	Netherlands	12.97	2
10	Megan Tapper	Jamaica	13.07	1
11	Christina Clemons	United States	13.09	1
12	Cindy Sember	Great Britain	13.15	2
13	Yanique Thompson	Jamaica	13.19	1
14	Heather Paton	Great Britain	13.25	2
15	Queen Claye	United States	13.27	2
16	Alicia Barrett	Great Britain	13.64	1

Women's 3000mSC
Place	Athlete	Country	Time	Points
1st place, gold medalist(s)	Beatrice Chepkoech	Kenya	9:05.55	8
2nd place, silver medalist(s)	Celliphine Chespol	Kenya	9:06.76	7
3rd place, bronze medalist(s)	Winfred Yavi	Bahrain	9:07.23	6
4	Hyvin Jepkemoi	Kenya	9:07.25	5
5	Norah Jeruto	Kenya	9:10.72	4
6	Gesa Felicitas Krause	Germany	9:20.55	3
7	Daisy Jepkemei	Kenya	9:20.68	2
8	Karoline Bjerkeli Grøvdal	Norway	9:22.69	1
9	Anna Emilie Møller	Denmark	9:26.96	
10	Irene Sánchez-Escribano	Spain	9:27.53	
11	Geneviève Lalonde	Canada	9:31.07	
12	Camilla Richardsson	Finland	9:39.85	
13	Elizabeth Bird	Great Britain	9:50.97	
14	Mel Lawrence	United States	9:53.61	
15	Rosie Clarke	Great Britain	9:54.25	
16	Aimee Pratt	Great Britain	9:58.68	
	Caroline Chepkurui	Kenya	DNF	

Women's Pole Vault
Place	Athlete	Country	Mark	Points
1st place, gold medalist(s)	Katerina Stefanidi	Greece	4.75 m	8
2nd place, silver medalist(s)	Alysha Newman	Canada	4.65 m	7
3rd place, bronze medalist(s)	Yarisley Silva	Cuba	4.65 m	6
4	Jenn Suhr	United States	4.65 m	5
5	Michaela Meijer	Sweden	4.55 m	4
6	Holly Bradshaw	Great Britain	4.55 m	3
7	Katie Moon	United States	4.55 m	2
8	Angelica Bengtsson	Sweden	4.55 m	1
	Robeilys Peinado	Venezuela	NM	

Women's Long Jump
Place	Athlete	Country	Mark	Points
1st place, gold medalist(s)	Nafissatou Thiam	Belgium	6.86 m (+0.9 m/s)	8
2nd place, silver medalist(s)	Ivana Vuleta	Serbia	6.85 m (+0.4 m/s)	7
3rd place, bronze medalist(s)	Katarina Johnson-Thompson	Great Britain	6.85 m (+0.4 m/s)	6
4	Abigail Irozuru	Great Britain	6.75 m (−0.5 m/s)	5
5	Maryna Bekh-Romanchuk	Ukraine	6.67 m (+0.6 m/s)	4
6	Yelena Sokolova	Authorised Neutral Athletes	6.67 m (−0.8 m/s)	3
7	Lorraine Ugen	Great Britain	6.61 m (±0.0 m/s)	2
8	Sha'Keela Saunders	United States	6.26 m (+1.1 m/s)	1

Women's Discus Throw
Place	Athlete	Country	Mark	Points
1st place, gold medalist(s)	Yaime Pérez	Cuba	64.87 m	8
2nd place, silver medalist(s)	Denia Caballero	Cuba	64.59 m	7
3rd place, bronze medalist(s)	Sandra Perković	Croatia	63.80 m	6
4	Kristin Pudenz	Germany	63.67 m	5
5	Claudine Vita	Germany	62.74 m	4
6	Valarie Allman	United States	61.42 m	3
7	Nadine Müller	Germany	60.00 m	2
8	Mélina Robert-Michon	France	57.67 m	1
9	Whitney Ashley	United States	56.98 m	
	Andressa de Morais	Brazil	DQ	

=== Promotional Events ===
Men's 800m
Place	Athlete	Country	Time
1st place, gold medalist(s)	Mark English	Ireland	1:45.94
2nd place, silver medalist(s)	Alfred Kipketer	Kenya	1:46.10
3rd place, bronze medalist(s)	Elliot Giles	Great Britain	1:46.27
4	Jamie Webb	Great Britain	1:46.38
5	Guy Learmonth	Great Britain	1:46.50
6	Erik Sowinski	United States	1:46.80
7	Spencer Thomas	Great Britain	1:46.88
8	Thomas Staines	Great Britain	1:47.28
9	Andreas Kramer	Sweden	1:47.60
10	Max Burgin	Great Britain	1:47.99
11	Joseph Deng	Australia	1:48.20
	Harun Abda	United States	DNF

Men's 1500m
Place	Athlete	Country	Time
1st place, gold medalist(s)	Ronald Musagala	Uganda	3:35.12
2nd place, silver medalist(s)	Stewart McSweyn	Australia	3:35.21
3rd place, bronze medalist(s)	Craig Engels	United States	3:35.51
4	Samuel Tefera	Ethiopia	3:35.77
5	Cornelius Tuwei	Kenya	3:36.26
6	Jesús Gómez	Spain	3:36.40
7	Ryan Gregson	Australia	3:38.15
8	Matthew Ramsden	Australia	3:39.53
9	Jakub Holuša	Czech Republic	3:40.52
10	Chris O'Hare	Great Britain	3:41.98
11	Piers Copeland	Great Britain	3:43.55
12	Jake Heyward	Great Britain	3:43.72
13	Zak Seddon	Great Britain	3:44.44
14	Kalle Berglund	Sweden	3:45.35
15	Jordan Williamsz	Australia	3:46.68
16	Djilali Bedrani	France	3:46.90
17	Amos Bartelsmeyer	Germany	3:47.32
	Julian Oakley	New Zealand	DNF
	Cornelius Kiplangat	Kenya	DNF

Men's 110mH (−0.2 m/s)
Place	Athlete	Country	Time
1st place, gold medalist(s)	Omar McLeod	Jamaica	13.21
2nd place, silver medalist(s)	Freddie Crittenden	United States	13.31
3rd place, bronze medalist(s)	Xie Wenjun	China	13.43
4	Daniel Roberts	United States	13.48
5	Cameron Fillery	Great Britain	13.54
6	Nicholas Hough	Australia	13.66
7	David King	Great Britain	13.69
8	Isaiah Moore	United States	13.81

Women's 100m (−0.9 m/s)
Place	Athlete	Country	Time
1st place, gold medalist(s)	Tatjana Pinto	Germany	11.15
2nd place, silver medalist(s)	Dezerea Bryant	United States	11.21
3rd place, bronze medalist(s)	Teahna Daniels	United States	11.24
4	Maja Mihalinec Zidar	Slovenia	11.36
5	Jonielle Smith	Jamaica	11.37
6	Rachel Miller	Great Britain	11.42
7	Kimbely Baptiste	Great Britain	11.71
8	Bianca Williams	Great Britain	11.77

== See also ==
- 2019 Weltklasse Zürich (first half of the Diamond League final)
- 2019 Memorial Van Damme (second half of the Diamond League final)
