= 2019 Anniversary Games =

- Dates: 20–21 July 2019
- Host city: London
- Venue: London Stadium
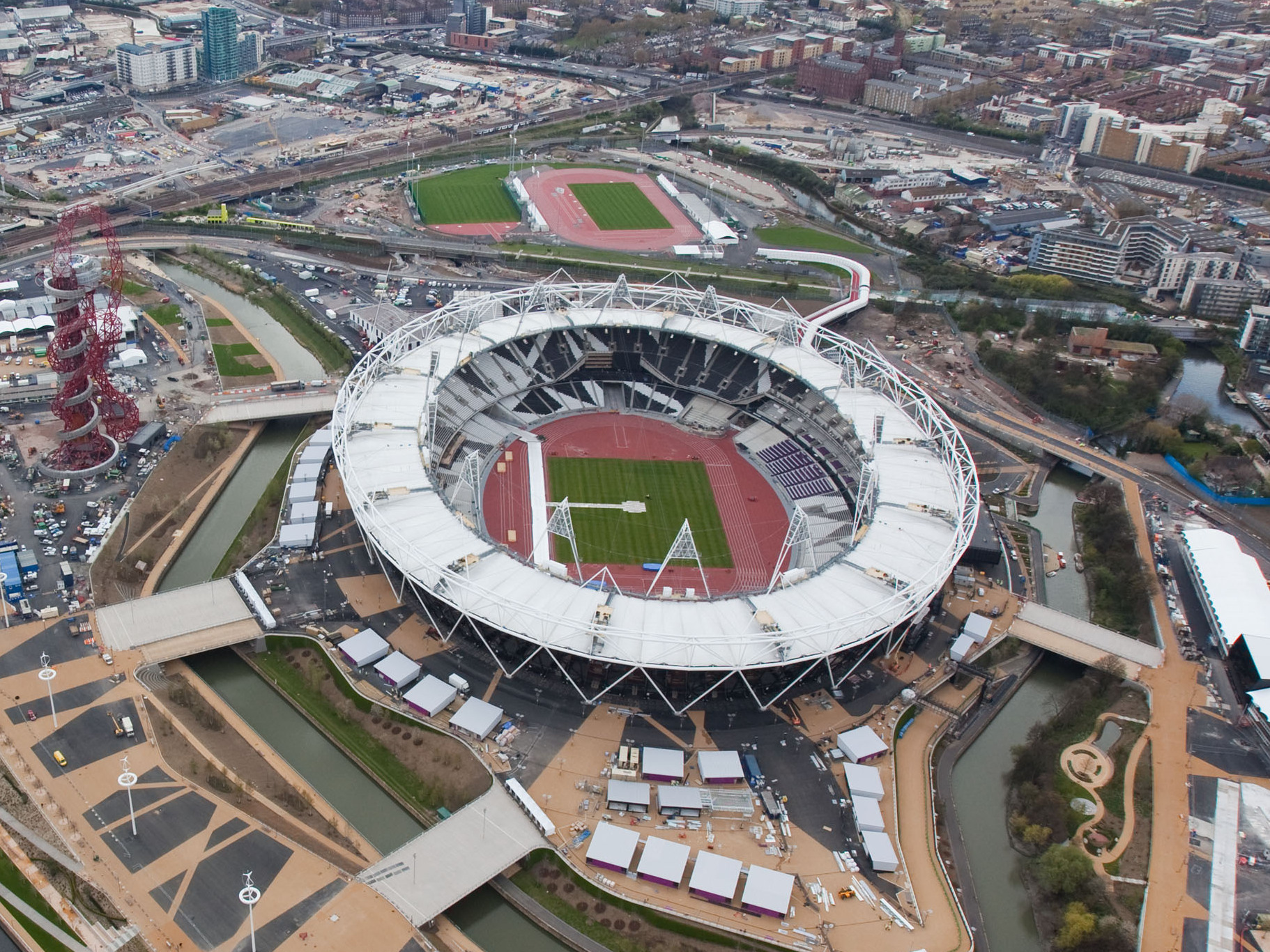
- Level: 2019 IAAF Diamond League

The 2019 Anniversary Games was the 67th edition of the annual outdoor track and field meeting in London. Held from 20 to 21 July at London Stadium, it was the tenth leg of the 2019 IAAF Diamond League – the highest level international track and field circuit.

The first day of competition was noted for the close race between Hagos Gebrhiwet and future Olympic gold medalist Jakob Ingebrigtsen, as well as the unexpected fall of Nijel Amos in the men's 800 m.

The final day was noted for Catriona Bisset's Australian record in the 800 m and Ingebrigtsen's loss again, this time in the 1500 m to Samuel Tefera.

== Diamond League results ==
Athletes competing in the Diamond League disciplines earned extra compensation and points which went towards qualifying for one of two Diamond League finals (either Zürich or Brussels depending on the discipline). First place earned 8 points, with each step down in place earning one less point than the previous, until no points are awarded in 9th place or lower.

=== Day 1 Diamond Discipline ===
Men's 100m (+0.5 m/s)
Place	Athlete	Country	Time	Points
1st place, gold medalist(s)	Akani Simbine	South Africa	9.93	8
2nd place, silver medalist(s)	Zharnel Hughes	Great Britain	9.95	7
3rd place, bronze medalist(s)	Yohan Blake	Jamaica	9.97	6
4	Yuki Koike	Japan	9.98	5
5	Andre De Grasse	Canada	9.99	4
6	Adam Gemili	Great Britain	10.04	3
7	Yoshihide Kiryū	Japan	10.13	2
8	Cejhae Greene	Antigua and Barbuda	10.19	1
9	Arthur Cissé	Ivory Coast	10.25	

Men's 100m Round 1
Place	Athlete	Country	Time	Heat
1	Zharnel Hughes	Great Britain	9.96	2
2	Akani Simbine	South Africa	10.01	1
3	Andre De Grasse	Canada	10.05	2
4	Yohan Blake	Jamaica	10.06	1
5	Adam Gemili	Great Britain	10.07	1
6	Yuki Koike	Japan	10.09	1
7	Cejhae Greene	Antigua and Barbuda	10.14	2
8	Yoshihide Kiryū	Japan	10.16	2
9	Arthur Cissé	Ivory Coast	10.17	1
10	Tyquendo Tracey	Jamaica	10.18	2
11	CJ Ujah	Great Britain	10.19	2
12	Andrew Robertson	Great Britain	10.28	1
13	Harry Aikines-Aryeetey	Great Britain	10.28	2
14	Richard Kilty	Great Britain	10.28	2
15	Julian Forte	Jamaica	10.33	1
16	Oliver Bromby	Great Britain	10.38	1
17	James Ellington	Great Britain	10.93	2
	Ojie Edoburun	Great Britain	DQ	1

Men's 800m
Place	Athlete	Country	Time	Points
1st place, gold medalist(s)	Ferguson Rotich	Kenya	1:43.14	8
2nd place, silver medalist(s)	Wyclife Kinyamal	Kenya	1:43.48	7
3rd place, bronze medalist(s)	Marcin Lewandowski	Poland	1:43.74	6
4	Cornelius Tuwei	Kenya	1:43.90	5
5	Wesley Vázquez	Puerto Rico	1:44.42	4
6	Jamie Webb	Great Britain	1:44.52	3
7	Adam Kszczot	Poland	1:44.61	2
8	Emmanuel Korir	Kenya	1:44.75	1
9	Kyle Langford	Great Britain	1:44.97	
10	Elliot Giles	Great Britain	1:45.03	
11	Andreas Kramer	Sweden	1:45.10	
	Nijel Amos	Botswana	DNF	
	Harun Abda	United States	DNF	

Men's Triple Jump
Place	Athlete	Country	Mark	Points
1st place, gold medalist(s)	Pedro Pichardo	Portugal	17.53 m (+0.8 m/s)	8
2nd place, silver medalist(s)	Christian Taylor	United States	17.19 m (±0.0 m/s)	7
3rd place, bronze medalist(s)	Hugues Fabrice Zango	Burkina Faso	16.88 m (−0.7 m/s)	6
4	Alexis Copello	Azerbaijan	16.80 m (−0.1 m/s)	5
5	Ben Williams	Great Britain	16.45 m (−1.4 m/s)	4
6	Nelson Évora	Portugal	16.37 m (−0.4 m/s)	3
7	Nathan Douglas	Great Britain	16.18 m (+0.1 m/s)	2

Women's 400m
Place	Athlete	Country	Time	Points
1st place, gold medalist(s)	Shericka Jackson	Jamaica	50.69	8
2nd place, silver medalist(s)	Stephenie Ann McPherson	Jamaica	50.74	7
3rd place, bronze medalist(s)	Laviai Nielsen	Great Britain	50.83	6
4	Anastasia Le-Roy	Jamaica	51.46	5
5	Justyna Święty-Ersetic	Poland	51.58	4
6	Emily Diamond	Great Britain	51.69	3
7	Anita Horvat	Slovenia	51.83	2
8	Amandine Brossier	France	52.03	1

Women's 1500m
Place	Athlete	Country	Time	Points
1st place, gold medalist(s)	Laura Muir	Great Britain	3:58.25	8
2nd place, silver medalist(s)	Winny Chebet	Kenya	3:59.93	7
3rd place, bronze medalist(s)	Gabriela DeBues-Stafford	Canada	4:00.26	6
4	Winnie Nanyondo	Uganda	4:00.40	5
5	Konstanze Klosterhalfen	Germany	4:00.43	4
6	Sarah McDonald	Great Britain	4:00.46	3
7	Jemma Reekie	Great Britain	4:02.09	2
8	Claudia Bobocea	Romania	4:02.27	1
9	Rababe Arafi	Morocco	4:03.53	
10	Daryia Barysevich	Belarus	4:03.58	
11	Ciara Mageean	Ireland	4:03.70	
12	Sofia Ennaoui	Poland	4:04.06	
13	Linden Hall	Australia	4:04.29	
14	Axumawit Embaye	Ethiopia	4:04.63	
	Hannah Segrave	Great Britain	DNF	

Women's 100mH (+0.8 m/s)
Place	Athlete	Country	Time	Points
1st place, gold medalist(s)	Danielle Williams	Jamaica	12.32	8
2nd place, silver medalist(s)	Nia Ali	United States	12.57	7
3rd place, bronze medalist(s)	Queen Claye	United States	12.64	6
4	Megan Tapper	Jamaica	12.66	5
5	Tobi Amusan	Nigeria	12.73	4
6	Pedrya Seymour	Bahamas	12.96	3
7	Elvira Herman	Belarus	13.02	2
8	Evonne Britton	United States	13.15	1
	Tiffani McReynolds	United States	DQ	

Women's 100mH Round 1
Place	Athlete	Country	Time	Heat
1	Danielle Williams	Jamaica	12.41	1
2	Megan Tapper	Jamaica	12.63	2
3	Nia Ali	United States	12.67	2
4	Tobi Amusan	Nigeria	12.74	2
5	Queen Claye	United States	12.80	1
6	Tiffani McReynolds	United States	12.82	2
7	Elvira Herman	Belarus	12.86	2
8	Pedrya Seymour	Bahamas	12.92	2
9	Evonne Britton	United States	12.95	1
10	Nadine Visser	Netherlands	12.95	2
11	Yanique Thompson	Jamaica	12.96	1
12	Nooralotta Neziri	Finland	12.97	2
13	Cindy Roleder	Germany	13.05	1
14	Cindy Sember	Great Britain	13.24	1
15	Yasmin Miller	Great Britain	13.51	2
	Celeste Mucci	Australia	DNF	1
	Alicia Barrett	Great Britain	DQ	1
	Jasmine Camacho-Quinn	Puerto Rico	DQ	1

Women's Pole Vault
Place	Athlete	Country	Mark	Points
1st place, gold medalist(s)	Anzhelika Sidorova	Authorised Neutral Athletes	4.75 m	8
2nd place, silver medalist(s)	Katerina Stefanidi	Greece	4.75 m	7
3rd place, bronze medalist(s)	Holly Bradshaw	Great Britain	4.65 m	6
4	Yarisley Silva	Cuba	4.65 m	5
5	Robeilys Peinado	Venezuela	4.65 m	4
6	Alysha Newman	Canada	4.65 m	3
7	Nikoleta Kyriakopoulou	Greece	4.55 m	2
8	Angelica Bengtsson	Sweden	4.55 m	1
9	Michaela Meijer	Sweden	4.55 m	

Women's Javelin Throw
Place	Athlete	Country	Mark	Points
1st place, gold medalist(s)	Tatsiana Khaladovich	Belarus	66.10 m	8
2nd place, silver medalist(s)	Kelsey-Lee Barber	Australia	65.85 m	7
3rd place, bronze medalist(s)	Christin Hussong	Germany	65.73 m	6
4	Sara Kolak	Croatia	63.80 m	5
5	Nikola Ogrodníková	Czech Republic	63.05 m	4
6	Barbora Špotáková	Czech Republic	61.82 m	3
7	Martina Ratej	Slovenia	60.79 m	2
8	Madara Palameika	Latvia	60.13 m	1
9	Kara Winger	United States	60.08 m	
10	Elizabeth Gleadle	Canada	58.38 m	

=== Day 1 Promotional Events ===
Men's 5000m
Place	Athlete	Country	Time
1st place, gold medalist(s)	Hagos Gebrhiwet	Ethiopia	13:01.86
2nd place, silver medalist(s)	Jakob Ingebrigtsen	Norway	13:02.03
3rd place, bronze medalist(s)	Nicholas Kimeli	Kenya	13:05.48
4	Stewart McSweyn	Australia	13:05.63
5	Andrew Butchart	Great Britain	13:06.21
6	Yemaneberhan Crippa	Italy	13:07.84
7	Patrick Tiernan	Australia	13:12.68
8	Morgan McDonald	Australia	13:18.91
9	Ben Connor	Great Britain	13:19.47
10	Paul Tanui	Kenya	13:23.27
11	Alex Yee	Great Britain	13:29.18
12	Brett Robinson	Australia	13:39.37
13	Marc Scott	Great Britain	13:49.55
14	Sam Parsons	Germany	13:50.30
15	Sam McEntee	Australia	13:55.07
16	Nick Goolab	Great Britain	14:02.27
	Sam Atkin	Great Britain	DNF
	Dominic Kiptarus	Kenya	DNF
	Cornelius Kiplangat	Kenya	DNF
	Jordan Gusman	Australia	DNF
^{[a]}	Rhonex Kipruto	Kenya	~~13:07.40~~

Men's 400mH
Place	Athlete	Country	Time
1st place, gold medalist(s)	Karsten Warholm	Norway	47.12
2nd place, silver medalist(s)	Yasmani Copello	Turkey	48.93
3rd place, bronze medalist(s)	Amere Lattin	United States	49.18
4	Byron Robinson	United States	49.29
5	Rasmus Mägi	Estonia	49.71
6	Jaheel Hyde	Jamaica	49.79
7	Jeffery Gibson	Bahamas	49.88
8	Chris McAlister	Great Britain	49.93
	Kyron McMaster	British Virgin Islands	DNF

Men's Long Jump
Place	Athlete	Country	Mark
1st place, gold medalist(s)	Luvo Manyonga	South Africa	8.37 m (−1.1 m/s)
2nd place, silver medalist(s)	Tajay Gayle	Jamaica	8.32 m (−0.8 m/s)
3rd place, bronze medalist(s)	Ruswahl Samaai	South Africa	8.11 m (−1.0 m/s)
4	Miltiadis Tentoglou	Greece	7.99 m (−0.8 m/s)
5	Trumaine Jefferson	United States	7.89 m (−1.4 m/s)
6	Jacob Fincham-Dukes	Great Britain	7.70 m (−1.3 m/s)
7	Dan Bramble	Great Britain	7.61 m (−1.0 m/s)
8	Henry Smith	Australia	7.57 m (−1.3 m/s)

Women's 200m (+1.1 m/s)
Place	Athlete	Country	Time
1st place, gold medalist(s)	Elaine Thompson-Herah	Jamaica	22.13
2nd place, silver medalist(s)	Marie-Josée Ta Lou	Ivory Coast	22.36
3rd place, bronze medalist(s)	Beth Dobbin	Great Britain	22.50
4	Shashalee Forbes	Jamaica	22.93
5	Jamile Samuel	Netherlands	22.94
6	Mujinga Kambundji	Switzerland	22.95
7	Schillonie Calvert	Jamaica	23.16
8	Bianca Williams	Great Britain	23.19
9	Katarina Johnson-Thompson	Great Britain	23.19

Women's 4 × 100 m
Place	Athlete	Country	Time
1st place, gold medalist(s)	Natasha Morrison; Elaine Thompson-Herah; Jonielle Smith; Shelly-Ann Fraser-Pryce	Jamaica	42.29
2nd place, silver medalist(s)	Ashleigh Nelson; Imani-Lara Lansiquot; Bianca Williams; Daryll Neita	Great Britain	42.30
3rd place, bronze medalist(s)	Liang Xiaojing; Ge Manqi; Wei Yongli; Kong Lingwei	China	42.71
4	Andressa Fidelis; Vitória Cristina Rosa; Franciela Krasucki; Rosângela Santos	Brazil	43.18
5	Cindy Sember; Shashalee Forbes; Mujinga Kambundji; Schillonie Calvert	International team	43.42
6	Kamila Ciba; Katarzyna Sokólska; Martyna Kotwiła; Ewa Swoboda	Poland	43.44
7	Nana Adoma Owusu-Afriyie; Kristie Edwards; Riley Day; Naa Anang	Australia	44.04

- ^{[a]} Rhonex Kipruto of Kenya was disqualified for doping violations.

=== Day 2 Diamond Discipline ===
Men's 400m
Place	Athlete	Country	Time	Points
1st place, gold medalist(s)	Akeem Bloomfield	Jamaica	44.40	8
2nd place, silver medalist(s)	Jonathan Jones	Barbados	44.63	7
3rd place, bronze medalist(s)	Nathon Allen	Jamaica	44.85	6
4	Obi Igbokwe	United States	45.06	5
5	Demish Gaye	Jamaica	45.11	4
6	Baboloki Thebe	Botswana	45.23	3
7	Luka Janežič	Slovenia	45.49	2
8	Rabah Yousif	Great Britain	45.52	1
9	Marcus Chambers	United States	46.26	

Men's High Jump
Place	Athlete	Country	Mark	Points
1st place, gold medalist(s)	Majd Eddin Ghazal	Syria	2.30 m	8
2nd place, silver medalist(s)	Mutaz Essa Barshim	Qatar	2.27 m	7
3rd place, bronze medalist(s)	Tihomir Ivanov	Bulgaria	2.24 m	6
4	Ilya Ivanyuk	Authorised Neutral Athletes	2.24 m	5
5	Tom Gale	Great Britain	2.24 m	4
6	Andriy Protsenko	Ukraine	2.24 m	3
7	Hamish Kerr	New Zealand	2.20 m	2
8	Chris Baker	Great Britain	2.20 m	1
9	Mathew Sawe	Kenya	2.20 m	

Men's Discus Throw
Place	Athlete	Country	Mark	Points
1st place, gold medalist(s)	Daniel Ståhl	Sweden	68.56 m	8
2nd place, silver medalist(s)	Fedrick Dacres	Jamaica	67.09 m	7
3rd place, bronze medalist(s)	Andrius Gudžius	Lithuania	65.40 m	6
4	Ola Stunes Isene	Norway	64.55 m	5
5	Piotr Małachowski	Poland	63.81 m	4
6	Lukas Weißhaidinger	Austria	63.74 m	3
7	Christoph Harting	Germany	63.69 m	2
8	Matthew Denny	Australia	63.25 m	1
9	Lawrence Okoye	Great Britain	60.80 m	
10	Gregory Thompson	Great Britain	60.42 m	

Women's 100m (+0.7 m/s)
Place	Athlete	Country	Time	Points
1st place, gold medalist(s)	Shelly-Ann Fraser-Pryce	Jamaica	10.78	8
2nd place, silver medalist(s)	Dina Asher-Smith	Great Britain	10.92	7
3rd place, bronze medalist(s)	Marie-Josée Ta Lou	Ivory Coast	10.98	6
4	Blessing Okagbare	Nigeria	11.04	5
5	Gina Lückenkemper	Germany	11.14	4
6	Murielle Ahouré-Demps	Ivory Coast	11.17	3
7	Tatjana Pinto	Germany	11.28	2
	Michelle-Lee Ahye	Trinidad and Tobago	DQ	
	Dafne Schippers	Netherlands	DQ	

Women's 100m Round 1
Place	Athlete	Country	Time	Heat
1	Dina Asher-Smith	Great Britain	10.91	2
2	Shelly-Ann Fraser-Pryce	Jamaica	10.95	1
3	Marie-Josée Ta Lou	Ivory Coast	10.96	2
4	Blessing Okagbare	Nigeria	11.10	2
5	Tatjana Pinto	Germany	11.12	1
6	Murielle Ahouré-Demps	Ivory Coast	11.15	1
7	Dafne Schippers	Netherlands	11.15	1
8	Gina Lückenkemper	Germany	11.17	2
9	Imani-Lara Lansiquot	Great Britain	11.24	1
10	Daryll Neita	Great Britain	11.24	2
11	Shashalee Forbes	Jamaica	11.35	2
12	Kristal Awuah	Great Britain	11.35	2
13	Asha Philip	Great Britain	11.37	1
14	Natasha Morrison	Jamaica	11.38	1
15	Jonielle Smith	Jamaica	11.38	2
16	Rosângela Santos	Brazil	11.43	1
17	Rachel Miller	Great Britain	11.44	2
	Michelle-Lee Ahye	Trinidad and Tobago	DQ	1

Women's 5000m
Place	Athlete	Country	Time	Points
1st place, gold medalist(s)	Hellen Obiri	Kenya	14:20.36	8
2nd place, silver medalist(s)	Agnes Tirop	Kenya	14:20.68	7
3rd place, bronze medalist(s)	Sifan Hassan	Netherlands	14:22.12	6
4	Margaret Kipkemboi	Kenya	14:31.69	5
5	Caroline Chepkoech Kipkirui	Kenya	14:36.10	4
6	Eva Cherono	Kenya	14:40.25	3
7	Beatrice Chebet	Kenya	14:46.12	2
8	Lilian Kasait Rengeruk	Kenya	14:48.69	1
9	Gloria Kite	Kenya	14:49.22	
10	Letesenbet Gidey	Ethiopia	14:51.46	
11	Karoline Bjerkeli Grøvdal	Norway	14:51.66	
12	Laura Weightman	Great Britain	14:51.78	
13	Eilish McColgan	Great Britain	14:51.89	
14	Lonah Chemtai Salpeter	Israel	14:59.02	
15	Dominique Scott-Efurd	South Africa	14:59.08	
16	Andrea Seccafien	Canada	15:12.93	
17	Jessica Warner-Judd	Great Britain	15:16.47	
18	Rosie Clarke	Great Britain	15:19.75	
19	Jessica O'Connell	Canada	15:28.80	
20	Amy-Eloise Markovc	Great Britain	15:35.02	
	Renata Pliś	Poland	DNF	
	Natalie Rule	Australia	DNF	
	Melissa Courtney-Bryant	Great Britain	DNF	
	Winnie Nanyondo	Uganda	DNF	

Women's 400mH
Place	Athlete	Country	Time	Points
1st place, gold medalist(s)	Rushell Clayton	Jamaica	54.16	8
2nd place, silver medalist(s)	Zuzana Hejnová	Czech Republic	54.33	7
3rd place, bronze medalist(s)	Tia-Adana Belle	Barbados	54.54	6
4	Anna Ryzhykova	Ukraine	54.64	5
5	Janieve Russell	Jamaica	55.14	4
6	Meghan Beesley	Great Britain	55.20	3
7	Sage Watson	Canada	55.32	2
8	Wenda Nel	South Africa	56.39	1

Women's Long Jump
Place	Athlete	Country	Mark	Points
1st place, gold medalist(s)	Malaika Mihambo	Germany	7.02 m (−0.5 m/s)	8
2nd place, silver medalist(s)	Brittney Reese	United States	6.82 m (−0.5 m/s)	7
3rd place, bronze medalist(s)	Maryna Bekh-Romanchuk	Ukraine	6.78 m (−1.3 m/s)	6
4	Brooke Buschkuehl	Australia	6.64 m (−0.2 m/s)	5
5	Lorraine Ugen	Great Britain	6.62 m (−0.9 m/s)	4
6	Tissanna Hickling	Jamaica	6.53 m (−1.0 m/s)	3
7	Katarina Johnson-Thompson	Great Britain	6.47 m (−0.8 m/s)	2
8	Christabel Nettey	Canada	6.33 m (−0.2 m/s)	1
	Shara Proctor	Great Britain	NM	

=== Day 2 Promotional Events ===
Men's 200m (+0.9 m/s)
Place	Athlete	Country	Time
1st place, gold medalist(s)	Xie Zhenye	China	19.88
2nd place, silver medalist(s)	Miguel Francis	Great Britain	19.97
3rd place, bronze medalist(s)	Aldemir da Silva Júnior	Brazil	20.17
4	Yuki Koike	Japan	20.24
5	Nethaneel Mitchell-Blake	Great Britain	20.28
6	Fausto Desalu	Italy	20.51
7	Alonso Edward	Panama	20.52
8	Shemar Boldizsar	Great Britain	20.56
9	Mario Burke	Barbados	20.78

Men's Mile
Place	Athlete	Country	Time
1st place, gold medalist(s)	Samuel Tefera	Ethiopia	3:49.45
2nd place, silver medalist(s)	Filip Ingebrigtsen	Norway	3:49.60
3rd place, bronze medalist(s)	Jake Wightman	Great Britain	3:52.02
4	Charles Simotwo	Kenya	3:53.31
5	Matthew Ramsden	Australia	3:53.32
6	Amos Bartelsmeyer	Germany	3:53.33
7	Chris O'Hare	Great Britain	3:53.35
8	Josh Kerr	Great Britain	3:53.88
9	Ryan Gregson	Australia	3:54.54
10	Jake Heyward	Great Britain	3:54.78
11	Nick Willis	New Zealand	3:55.45
12	Piers Copeland	Great Britain	3:56.05
13	James West	Great Britain	3:56.79
14	Vincent Kibet	Kenya	3:58.09
15	Zak Seddon	Great Britain	3:58.90
16	Neil Gourley	Great Britain	4:05.80
	Bram Som	Netherlands	DNF
	Jordan Williamsz	Australia	DNF

Men's 110mH (+0.4 m/s)
Place	Athlete	Country	Time
1st place, gold medalist(s)	Xie Wenjun	China	13.28
2nd place, silver medalist(s)	Wilhem Belocian	France	13.28
3rd place, bronze medalist(s)	Omar McLeod	Jamaica	13.32
4	Pascal Martinot-Lagarde	France	13.49
5	Antonio Alkana	South Africa	13.51
6	Andrew Pozzi	Great Britain	13.52
7	Ronald Levy	Jamaica	13.60
8	David King	Great Britain	13.66
	Cameron Fillery	Great Britain	DQ

Men's 4 × 100 m
Place	Athlete	Country	Time
1st place, gold medalist(s)	CJ Ujah; Zharnel Hughes; Richard Kilty; Nethaneel Mitchell-Blake	Great Britain	37.60
2nd place, silver medalist(s)	Shuhei Tada; Yuki Koike; Yoshihide Kiryū; Kirara Shiraishi	Japan	37.78
3rd place, bronze medalist(s)	Chris Garia; Taymir Burnet; Hensley Paulina; Churandy Martina	Netherlands	37.99
4	Rodrigo do Nascimento; Jorge Vides; Derick Silva; Aldemir da Silva Júnior	Brazil	38.01
5	Xu Haiyang; Liang Jinsheng; Xu Zhouzheng; Xie Zhenye	China	38.54
6	Wei Yi-ching; Cheng Po-yu; Wei Tai-sheng; Wang Wei-hsu	Chinese Taipei	39.76
7	Karol Kwiatkowski; Krzysztof Grześkowiak; Adrian Brzeziński; Przemysław Słowikowski	Poland	39.87

Women's 800m
Place	Athlete	Country	Time
1st place, gold medalist(s)	Lynsey Sharp	Great Britain	1:58.61
2nd place, silver medalist(s)	Catriona Bisset	Australia	1:58.78
3rd place, bronze medalist(s)	Alexandra Bell	Great Britain	1:59.82
4	Shelayna Oskan-Clarke	Great Britain	1:59.83
5	Morgan Mitchell	Australia	2:00.06
6	Hannah Segrave	Great Britain	2:00.18
7	Natoya Goule	Jamaica	2:00.51
8	Carley Thomas	Australia	2:01.01
9	Adelle Tracey	Great Britain	2:09.74
	Aneta Lemiesz	Poland	DNF

== See also ==
- 2019 Weltklasse Zürich (first half of the Diamond League final)
- 2019 Memorial Van Damme (second half of the Diamond League final)
