= British Grand Prix (athletics) =

UK athletics competition

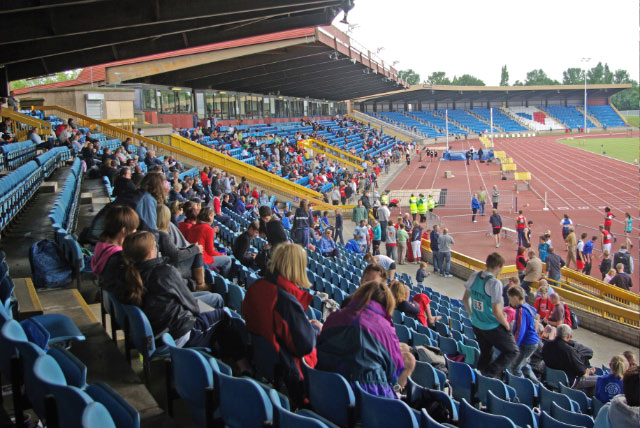
- The host stadium – Alexander Stadium
- Date: May–August
- Location: Birmingham, England
- Event type: Track and field
- World Athletics Cat.: GW

The British Grand Prix, formerly known as the Birmingham Grand Prix or the Aviva Birmingham Grand Prix, was an annual athletics meeting. From 2010 through 2021 it was a part of the Diamond League series of track and field meets. From 1997 through 2005 the name British Grand Prix was used for meetings that were part of the London Grand Prix series, before reverting to the meetings usually held in Gateshead and Birmingham.

In 2020 the event was due to be held at the Gateshead International Stadium but was cancelled due to the COVID-19 pandemic in the United Kingdom. The event returned once more to Gateshead in 2021. There was a 2022 Diamond League meeting (2022 Birmingham Diamond League) held at Alexander Stadium in Birmingham, though it was officially a continuation of the Anniversary Games (usually held in London) rather than a British Grand Prix event.

== Editions ==
The event has been sponsored by a variety of companies including Bupa, Norwich Union, Aviva and Müller.

British Grand Prix editions
Ed.	Meeting	Series	Date	Sponsor	Ref.
1st	International Invitation Meeting (Note: Also known as Pearl Assurance Invitational)		9 Aug 1991	Pearl Assurance	
2nd	International Invitation Meeting (Note: Also known as Vauxhall Invitational)		17 Jul 1992	Vauxhall Motors	
3rd	International Invitation Meeting		30 Jul 1993	Vauxhall Motors	
4th	1994 British Grand Prix II (Note: Also known as Gateshead Games and Bupa Games)	1994 IAAF Grand Prix II	1 Jul 1994	Bupa	
5th	1995 British Grand Prix II (Note: Also known as Gateshead Games and Bupa Games)	1995 IAAF Grand Prix II	2 Jul 1995	Bupa	
6th	1996 British Grand Prix II (Note: Also known as Bupa International and Bupa Games)	1996 IAAF Grand Prix II	30 Jun 1996	Bupa	
7th	1997 British Grand Prix II (Note: Also known as Bupa International and Bupa Games)	1997 IAAF Grand Prix II	7 Sep 1997	Bupa	
8th	1998 British Grand Prix II (Note: Also known as Bupa Games)	1998 IAAF Grand Prix II	19 Jul 1998	Bupa	
9th	1999 British Grand Prix II (Note: Officially known as CGU Gateshead Classic)	1999 IAAF Grand Prix II	27 Jun 1999	CGU	
10th	2000 British Grand Prix II	2000 IAAF Grand Prix II	28 Aug 2000	CGU	
11th	2001 British Grand Prix II (Note: Officially known as Norwich Union Classic Grand Prix II)	2001 IAAF Grand Prix II	19 Aug 2001	Norwich Union	
12th	2002 British Grand Prix II (Note: Officially known as Norwich Union Classic)	2002 IAAF Grand Prix II	30 June 2002	Norwich Union	
13th	2003 British Super Grand Prix	2003 IAAF Super Grand Prix	13 Jul 2003	Norwich Union	
14th	2004 British Super Grand Prix (Note: Officially known as Norwich Union Super Grand Prix)	2004 IAAF Super Grand Prix	27 Jun 2004	Norwich Union	
15th	2005 British Super Grand Prix	2005 IAAF Super Grand Prix	21 Aug 2005	Norwich Union	
16th	2006 British Grand Prix	2006 IAAF Grand Prix	11 Jun 2006	Norwich Union	
17th	2007 British Grand Prix	2007 IAAF Grand Prix	15 Jul 2007	Norwich Union	
18th	2008 British Grand Prix	2008 IAAF Grand Prix	31 Aug 2008	Aviva	
19th	2009 British Grand Prix	2009 IAAF Grand Prix	31 Aug 2009	Aviva	
20th	2010 British Grand Prix	2010 Diamond League	10 Jul 2010	Aviva	
21st	2011 Birmingham Grand Prix	2011 Diamond League	10 Jul 2011	Aviva	
22nd	2012 Birmingham Grand Prix	2012 Diamond League	26 Aug 2012	Aviva	
23rd	2013 Birmingham Grand Prix	2013 Diamond League	30 Jun 2013	Sainsbury's	
24th	2014 Birmingham Grand Prix	2014 Diamond League	24 Aug 2014	Sainsbury's	
25th	2015 Birmingham Grand Prix	2015 Diamond League	7 Jun 2015	Sainsbury's	
26th	2016 Birmingham Grand Prix	2016 Diamond League	5 Jun 2016	Müller	
27th	2017 Birmingham Grand Prix	2017 Diamond League	20 Aug 2017	Müller	
28th	2018 Birmingham Grand Prix	2018 Diamond League	18 Aug 2018	Müller	
29th	2019 Birmingham Grand Prix	2019 Diamond League	18 Aug 2019	Müller	
2020: Meet canceled due to COVID-19
30th	2021 British Grand Prix (Note: Officially known as Müller Grand Prix Gateshead)	2021 Diamond League	23 May 2021	Müller	
The 2022 Birmingham meet was part of the London Diamond League series

== Venues ==
Venues for the British Grand Prix
Years	Venue	Region	Country
1991–2001, 2003–2004, 2006, 2008–2010, 2021	Gateshead International Stadium	Gateshead	England
2002, 2005, 2007	Don Valley Stadium	Sheffield	England
2011–2019	Alexander Stadium	Birmingham	England

== World records ==
Over the course of its history, the following world records have been set at the British Grand Prix.

World records set at the British Grand Prix
Year	Event	Record	Athlete	Nationality
2004	Pole vault	4.87 m	Yelena Isinbayeva	Russia
2006	100 m	9.77 (+1.5 m/s)	Asafa Powell	Jamaica

== Meeting records ==
=== Men ===
Men's meeting records of the British Grand Prix
Event	Record	Athlete	Nationality	Date	Place	Ref.
100 m	9.77 (+1.5 m/s)	Asafa Powell	Jamaica	11 June 2006	Gateshead	
150 m	14.97 (+0.9 m/s)	Linford Christie	Great Britain	4 September 1994 (Note: The Diamond League organization includes this date in the Gateshead Grand Prix II series, even though the actual GP2 meeting took place on July 1.)	Sheffield	
200 m	19.94 (+1.4 m/s)	Michael Johnson	United States	15 September 1991 (Note: The Diamond League organization includes this McVitie's Challenge meeting in the Gateshead series, even though the actual Gateshead meeting took place on August 9.)	Sheffield	
300 m	31.56	Douglas Walker	Great Britain	19 July 1998	Gateshead	
400 m	44.23	Kirani James	Grenada	5 June 2016	Birmingham	
600 m	1:13.10 DLR	David Rudisha	Kenya	5 June 2016	Birmingham	
800 m	1:42.79	Emmanuel Korir	Kenya	18 August 2018	Birmingham	
1000 m	2:16.18	Bernard Lagat	United States	31 August 2008	Gateshead	
1500 m	3:29.33	Asbel Kiprop	Kenya	5 June 2016	Birmingham	
Mile	3:51.89	Asbel Kiprop	Kenya	24 August 2014	Birmingham	
2000 m	4:48.36	Hicham El Guerrouj	Morocco	19 July 1998	Gateshead	
3000 m	7:26.69	Kenenisa Bekele	Ethiopia	15 July 2007	Sheffield	
Two miles	8:07.85	Mo Farah	Great Britain	24 August 2014	Birmingham	
5000 m	13:00.20	Vincent Chepkok	Kenya	10 July 2010	Gateshead	
110 m hurdles	12.95 (−0.9 m/s)	Aries Merritt	United States	26 August 2012	Birmingham	
300 m hurdles	34.48	Chris Rawlinson	Great Britain	30 June 2002	Sheffield	
400 m hurdles	47.67	Kevin Young	United States	14 August 1992 (Note: The Diamond League organization includes this Lucozade Games meeting in the Gateshead series, even though the actual Gateshead meeting took place on July 17.)	Sheffield	
3000 m steeplechase	8:00.12	Conseslus Kipruto	Kenya	5 June 2016	Birmingham	
High jump	2.40 m	Mutaz Essa Barshim	Qatar	20 August 2017	Birmingham	
Pole vault	5.91 m	Aleksandr Averbukh	Israel	19 August 2001	Gateshead	
Long jump	8.53 m (+1.5 m/s)	Luvo Manyonga	South Africa	18 August 2018	Birmingham	
Triple jump	17.74 m (+1.9 m/s)	Christian Olsson	Sweden	13 July 2003	Gateshead	
Shot put	22.45 m	Christian Cantwell	United States	11 June 2006	Gateshead	
Discus throw	69.83 m	Piotr Małachowski	Poland	10 July 2010	Gateshead	
Hammer throw	78.51 m	Pawel Fajdek	Poland	20 August 2017	Birmingham	
Javelin throw	95.66 m	Jan Železný	Czech Republic	29 August 1993	Sheffield	
4 × 100 m relay	37.95	HSI: Jon Drummond; Bernard Williams; Curtis Johnson; Maurice Greene	United States	28 August 2000	Gateshead	

=== Women ===
Women's meeting records of the British Grand Prix
Event	Record	Athlete	Nationality	Date	Place	Ref.
100 m	10.81 (+0.7 m/s)	Carmelita Jeter	United States	26 August 2012	Birmingham	
200 m	22.15 (+0.4 m/s)	Shaunae Miller-Uibo	Bahamas	18 August 2018	Birmingham	
300 m	35.71	Donna Fraser	Great Britain	28 August 2000	Gateshead	
400 m	49.77	Sanya Richards	United States	21 August 2005	Sheffield	
800 m	1:56.92	Francine Niyonsaba	Burundi	5 June 2016	Birmingham	
1000 m	2:33.92	Laura Muir	Great Britain	18 August 2018	Birmingham	
1500 m	3:58.07	Kelly Holmes	Great Britain	29 June 1997 (Note: The Diamond League organization includes this date in the Gateshead Grand Prix II series, even though it was part of the London Grand Prix I series, which had been relocated to Sheffield only in 1997 and 1998, and the actual GP2 meeting took place on September 7.)	Sheffield	
Mile	4:21.11	Konstanze Klosterhalfen	Germany	18 August 2019	Birmingham	
2000 m	5:34.49	Angela Chalmers	Canada	4 September 1994	Sheffield	
3000 m	8:28.90	Sifan Hassan	Netherlands	20 August 2017	Birmingham	
Two miles	9:11.49	Mercy Cherono	Kenya	24 August 2014	Birmingham	
5000 m	14:51.77	Tirunesh Dibaba	Ethiopia	21 August 2005	Sheffield	
10,000 m	30:17.15	Paula Radcliffe	Great Britain	27 June 2004	Gateshead	
100 m hurdles	12.46 (−0.3 m/s)	Kendra Harrison	United States	5 June 2016	Birmingham	
100 m hurdles	12.46 (−0.2 m/s)	Danielle Williams	Jamaica	18 August 2019	Birmingham	
400 m hurdles	53.78	Kaliese Spencer	Jamaica	26 August 2012	Birmingham	
3000 m steeplechase	9:05.55	Beatrice Chepkoech	Kenya	18 August 2019	Birmingham	
High jump	2.03 m	Kajsa Bergqvist	Sweden	21 August 2005	Sheffield	
Pole vault	4.87 m	Yelena Isinbayeva	Russia	27 June 2004	Gateshead	
Long jump	6.96 m (+1.5 m/s)	Malaika Mihambo	Germany	18 August 2018	Birmingham	
Triple jump	14.94 m (+0.9 m/s)	Ashia Hansen	Great Britain	29 June 1997	Sheffield	
Shot put	20.52 m	Valerie Adams	New Zealand	26 August 2012	Birmingham	
Shot put	20.57 m X	Nadzeya Astapchuk	Belarus	10 July 2010	Gateshead	
Discus throw	69.23 m	Sandra Perković	Croatia	7 June 2015	Birmingham	
Hammer throw	71.14 m	Joanna Fiodorow	Poland	20 August 2017	Birmingham	
Javelin throw	66.08 m	Barbora Špotáková	Czech Republic	26 August 2012	Birmingham	
4 × 100 m relay	43.80		Jamaica	17 July 1992	Gateshead	
