= 2022 Birmingham Diamond League =

- Dates: 21 May 2022
- Host city: Birmingham
- Venue: Alexander Stadium
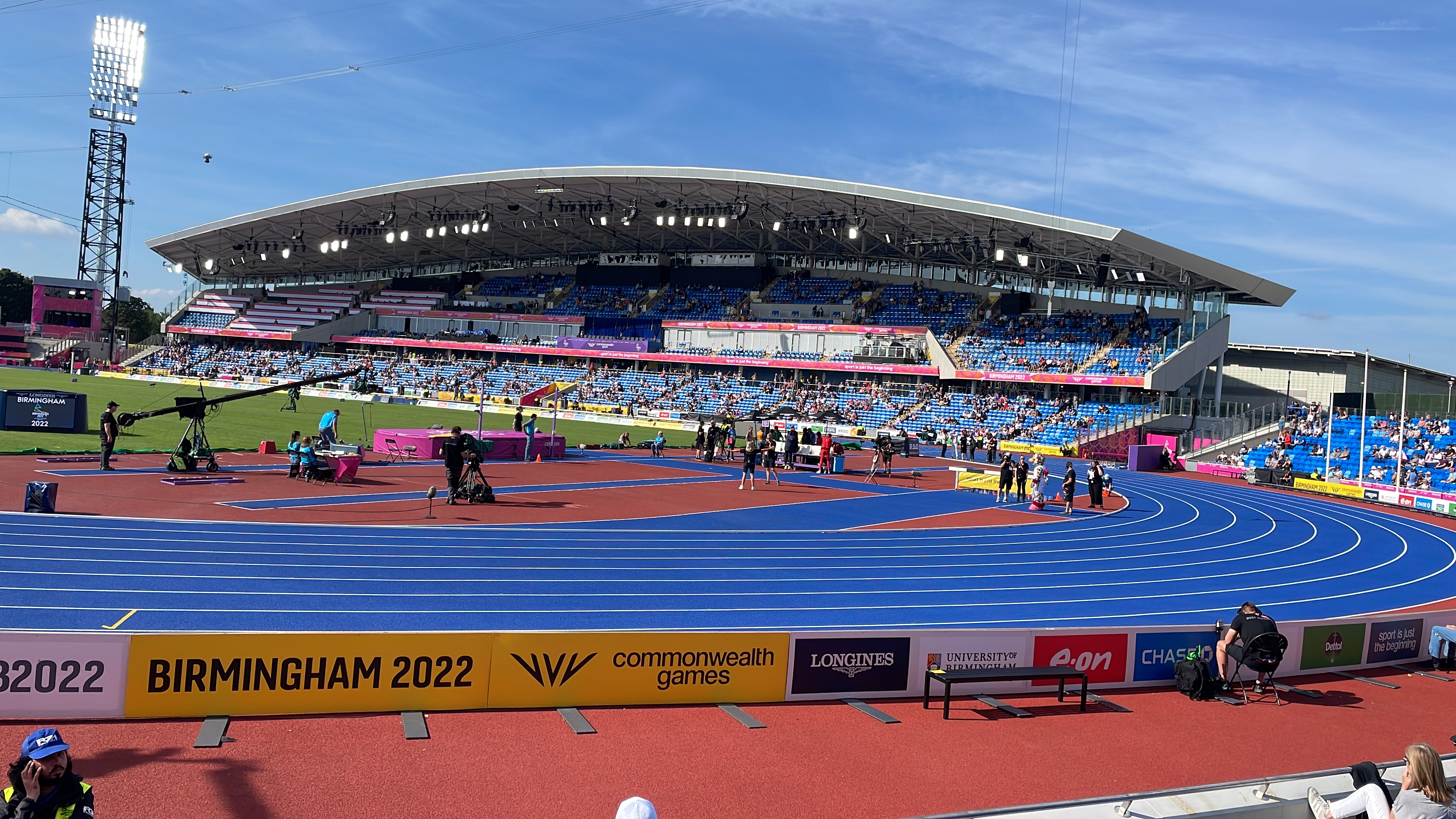
- Level: 2022 Diamond League

The 2022 Müller Birmingham Diamond League, also known as the 2022 Anniversary Games, was the 69th edition of the annual outdoor track and field meeting usually held in London, though in 2022 it was held in Birmingham instead. Held on 21 May at Alexander Stadium, it was the second leg of the 2022 Diamond League – the highest level international track and field circuit.

The meeting was highlighted by home crowd wins by Dina Asher-Smith, Keely Hodgkinson, and Laura Muir. Francine Niyonsaba withdrew from the meet due to a visa issue, allowing Dawit Seyaum to win the women's 5000 metres. In the discus, Kristjan Ceh broke the Diamond League record with a 71.27 m throw.

== Results ==
Athletes competing in the Diamond League disciplines earned extra compensation and points which went towards qualifying for the Diamond League finals in Zürich. First place earned 8 points, with each step down in place earning one less point than the previous, until no points are awarded in 9th place or lower.

=== Diamond Discipline ===
Men's 100m (−0.2 m/s)
Place	Athlete	Country	Time	Points
1st place, gold medalist(s)	Aaron Brown	Canada	10.13	8
2nd place, silver medalist(s)	Yohan Blake	Jamaica	10.18	7
3rd place, bronze medalist(s)	Jerome Blake	Canada	10.20	6
4	Andre De Grasse	Canada	10.24	5
5	Nethaneel Mitchell-Blake	Great Britain	10.31	4
6	Adam Gemili	Great Britain	10.38	3
7	Reece Prescod	Great Britain	10.65	2
	Trayvon Bromell	United States	DQ	
	Zharnel Hughes	Great Britain	DQ	

Men's 400m
Place	Athlete	Country	Time	Points
1st place, gold medalist(s)	Matthew Hudson-Smith	Great Britain	45.32	8
2nd place, silver medalist(s)	Bryce Deadmon	United States	45.51	7
3rd place, bronze medalist(s)	Kahmari Montgomery	United States	45.52	6
4	Vernon Norwood	United States	45.53	5
5	Isaac Makwala	Botswana	45.98	4
6	Liemarvin Bonevacia	Netherlands	46.37	3
7	Alex Haydock-Wilson	Great Britain	46.49	2
8	Wilbert London	United States	46.89	1
9	Jochem Dobber	Netherlands	47.61	

Men's 800m
Place	Athlete	Country	Time	Points
1st place, gold medalist(s)	Marco Arop	Canada	1:45.41	8
2nd place, silver medalist(s)	Benjamin Robert	France	1:46.22	7
3rd place, bronze medalist(s)	Bryce Hoppel	United States	1:46.33	6
4	Jake Wightman	Great Britain	1:46.39	5
5	Patryk Dobek	Poland	1:46.63	4
6	Wyclife Kinyamal	Kenya	1:46.64	3
7	Clayton Murphy	United States	1:47.23	2
8	Daniel Rowden	Great Britain	1:47.29	1
9	Peter Bol	Australia	1:47.59	
10	Mariano García	Spain	1:48.77	
	Erik Sowinski	United States	DNF	

Men's 1500m
Place	Athlete	Country	Time	Points
1st place, gold medalist(s)	Abel Kipsang	Kenya	3:35.15	8
2nd place, silver medalist(s)	Mohamed Katir	Spain	3:35.62	7
3rd place, bronze medalist(s)	Ollie Hoare	Australia	3:35.76	6
4	Michał Rozmys	Poland	3:35.86	5
5	Josh Kerr	Great Britain	3:35.92	4
6	Adel Mechaal	Spain	3:35.93	3
7	Charles Grethen	Luxembourg	3:37.00	2
8	Matthew Stonier	Great Britain	3:37.25	1
9	Geordie Beamish	New Zealand	3:37.45	
10	Ignacio Fontes	Spain	3:37.66	
11	Matthew Ramsden	Australia	3:39.65	
12	Baptiste Mischler	France	3:39.94	
13	George Mills	Great Britain	3:42.33	
14	Stewart McSweyn	Australia	3:44.14	
15	Charles Simotwo	Kenya	3:44.82	
	Piers Copeland	Great Britain	DNF	
	Erik Sowinski	United States	DNF	

Men's 110mH (+0.2 m/s)
Place	Athlete	Country	Time	Points
1st place, gold medalist(s)	Hansle Parchment	Jamaica	13.09	8
2nd place, silver medalist(s)	Omar McLeod	Jamaica	13.17	7
3rd place, bronze medalist(s)	Asier Martínez	Spain	13.32	6
4	Damian Czykier	Poland	13.32	5
5	Andrew Pozzi	Great Britain	13.39	4
6	Aurel Manga	France	13.61	3
7	David King	Great Britain	13.64	2
8	Wellington Zaza	Liberia	13.81	1
9	Cameron Fillery	Great Britain	13.90	

Men's High Jump
Place	Athlete	Country	Mark	Points
1st place, gold medalist(s)	Django Lovett	Canada	2.28 m	8
2nd place, silver medalist(s)	Gianmarco Tamberi	Italy	2.25 m	7
3rd place, bronze medalist(s)	Norbert Kobielski	Poland	2.25 m	6
4	Shelby McEwen	United States	2.22 m	5
5	Loïc Gasch	Switzerland	2.18 m	4
6	Hamish Kerr	New Zealand	2.18 m	3
7	Joel Clarke-Khan	Great Britain	2.18 m	2

Men's Discus Throw
Place	Athlete	Country	Mark	Points
1st place, gold medalist(s)	Kristjan Čeh	Slovenia	71.27 m	8
2nd place, silver medalist(s)	Andrius Gudžius	Lithuania	66.40 m	7
3rd place, bronze medalist(s)	Daniel Ståhl	Sweden	65.97 m	6
4	Lukas Weißhaidinger	Austria	65.14 m	5
5	Matthew Denny	Australia	64.15 m	4
6	Nicholas Percy	Great Britain	63.03 m	3
7	Robert Urbanek	Poland	61.06 m	2
8	Simon Pettersson	Sweden	56.82 m	1

Women's 100m (−0.1 m/s)
Place	Athlete	Country	Time	Points
1st place, gold medalist(s)	Dina Asher-Smith	Great Britain	11.11	8
2nd place, silver medalist(s)	Shericka Jackson	Jamaica	11.12	7
3rd place, bronze medalist(s)	Daryll Neita	Great Britain	11.14	6
4	Mikiah Brisco	United States	11.25	5
5	Gabrielle Thomas	United States	11.31	4
6	Destiny Smith-Barnett	United States	11.35	3
7	Cambrea Sturgis	United States	11.35	2
8	Anthonique Strachan	Bahamas	11.41	1
9	Ajla Del Ponte	Switzerland	11.72	

Women's 800m
Place	Athlete	Country	Time	Points
1st place, gold medalist(s)	Keely Hodgkinson	Great Britain	1:58.63	8
2nd place, silver medalist(s)	Rénelle Lamote	France	1:59.53	7
3rd place, bronze medalist(s)	Natoya Goule	Jamaica	2:00.13	6
4	Sage Hurta	United States	2:00.48	5
5	Alexandra Bell	Great Britain	2:00.67	4
6	Christina Hering	Germany	2:00.82	3
7	Lindsey Butterworth	Canada	2:01.20	2
8	Louise Shanahan	Ireland	2:01.35	1
9	Gaia Sabbatini	Italy	2:01.38	
10	Katharina Trost	Germany	2:01.80	
	Agata Kołakowska	Poland	DNF	

Women's 1500m
Place	Athlete	Country	Time	Points
1st place, gold medalist(s)	Laura Muir	Great Britain	4:02.81	8
2nd place, silver medalist(s)	Jessica Hull	Australia	4:03.42	7
3rd place, bronze medalist(s)	Winny Chebet	Kenya	4:05.56	6
4	Ciara Mageean	Ireland	4:05.70	5
5	Jemma Reekie	Great Britain	4:07.01	4
6	Marta Pérez	Spain	4:07.93	3
7	Cory McGee	United States	4:08.26	2
8	Katie Snowden	Great Britain	4:08.33	1
9	Elise Vanderelst	Belgium	4:09.30	
10	Kristiina Mäki	Czech Republic	4:13.83	
11	Sarah Healy	Ireland	4:15.97	
	Ellie Sanford	Australia	DNF	

Women's 5000m
Place	Athlete	Country	Time	Points
1st place, gold medalist(s)	Dawit Seyaum	Ethiopia	14:47.55	8
2nd place, silver medalist(s)	Hawi Feysa	Ethiopia	14:48.94	7
3rd place, bronze medalist(s)	Fantu Worku	Ethiopia	14:49.64	6
4	Karoline Bjerkeli Grøvdal	Norway	14:51.38	5
5	Hanna Klein	Germany	14:51.71	4
6	Jessica Warner-Judd	Great Britain	14:57.19	3
7	Sarah Lahti	Sweden	15:04.87	2
8	Carla Gallardo	Spain	15:10.62	1
9	Sara Benfares	Germany	15:25.74	
10	Rose Davies	Australia	15:28.47	
11	Marta García	Spain	15:28.55	
12	Isobel Batt-Doyle	Australia	15:29.05	
13	Viktória Wagner-Gyürkés	Hungary	15:32.17	
14	Cristina Ruiz	Spain	15:34.49	
15	Verity Ockenden	Great Britain	15:45.04	
	Nadia Battocletti	Italy	DNF	
	Calli Thackery	Great Britain	DNF	
	Sarah Billings	Australia	DNF	

Women's 400mH
Place	Athlete	Country	Time	Points
1st place, gold medalist(s)	Dalilah Muhammad	United States	54.54	8
2nd place, silver medalist(s)	Viktoriya Tkachuk	Ukraine	55.25	7
3rd place, bronze medalist(s)	Anna Ryzhykova	Ukraine	55.37	6
4	Lina Nielsen	Great Britain	55.40	5
5	Gianna Woodruff	Panama	55.43	4
6	Jessie Knight	Great Britain	55.50	3
7	Janieve Russell	Jamaica	56.21	2
8	Jessica Turner	Great Britain	57.43	1

Women's Pole Vault
Place	Athlete	Country	Mark	Points
1st place, gold medalist(s)	Sandi Morris	United States	4.73 m	8
2nd place, silver medalist(s)	Tina Šutej	Slovenia	4.65 m	7
3rd place, bronze medalist(s)	Katerina Stefanidi	Greece	4.65 m	6
4	Sophie Cook	Great Britain	4.45 m	5
5	Emily Grove	United States	4.45 m	4
6	Nikoleta Kyriakopoulou	Greece	4.45 m	3
7	Katie Moon	United States	4.30 m	2
	Michaela Meijer	Sweden	NM	
	Holly Bradshaw	Great Britain	NM	

Women's Long Jump
Place	Athlete	Country	Mark	Points
1st place, gold medalist(s)	Malaika Mihambo	Germany	7.09 m (±0.0 m/s)	8
2nd place, silver medalist(s)	Maryna Bekh-Romanchuk	Ukraine	6.66 m (+0.8 m/s)	7
3rd place, bronze medalist(s)	Lorraine Ugen	Great Britain	6.65 m (+1.4 m/s)	6
4	Jazmin Sawyers	Great Britain	6.60 m (+1.6 m/s)	5
5	Ivana Španović	Serbia	6.54 m (+0.5 m/s)	4
6	Kendell Williams	United States	6.47 m (+2.3 m/s)	3
7	Khaddi Sagnia	Sweden	6.46 m (±0.0 m/s)	2
8	Katarina Johnson-Thompson	Great Britain	6.41 m (+2.2 m/s)	1
Best wind-legal performances
	Kendell Williams	United States	6.35 m (−1.2 m/s)	
	Katarina Johnson-Thompson	Great Britain	6.24 m (+1.5 m/s)	

Women's Discus Throw
Place	Athlete	Country	Mark	Points
1st place, gold medalist(s)	Valarie Allman	United States	67.85 m	8
2nd place, silver medalist(s)	Sandra Perković	Croatia	67.26 m	7
3rd place, bronze medalist(s)	Laulauga Tausaga	United States	60.80 m	6
4	Mélina Robert-Michon	France	59.96 m	5
5	Marija Tolj	Croatia	59.55 m	4
6	Liliana Cá	Portugal	58.34 m	3
7	Jade Lally	Great Britain	57.90 m	2
8	Kirsty Law	Great Britain	55.35 m	1

=== Promotional Events ===
Men's 4x100m
Place	Athlete	Country	Time
1st place, gold medalist(s)	Aaron Brown; Jerome Blake; Brendon Rodney; Andre De Grasse	Canada	38.31
2nd place, silver medalist(s)	Jeremiah Azu; Harry Aikines-Aryeetey; Tommy Ramdhan; Sam Gordon	Great Britain	38.66
3rd place, bronze medalist(s)	Joris van Gool; Taymir Burnet; Hensley Paulina; Raphael Bouju	Netherlands	38.88
4	Adam Thomas; Stephen Dunlop; Michael Olsen; Krishawn Aiken	Great Britain	40.08
5	Dewi Hammond; Leon Greenwood; Zachary Price; Jac Patterson	Great Britain	40.51
	Adam Gemili; Zharnel Hughes; Richard Kilty; Nethaneel Mitchell-Blake	Great Britain	DNF
	Amaury Golitin; Jeff Erius; Méba-Mickaël Zeze; Mouhamadou Fall	France	DQ
	Dominik Kopeć; Mateusz Siuda; Patryk Wykrota; Adrian Brzeziński	Poland	DQ

Women's 4x100m
Place	Athlete	Country	Time
1st place, gold medalist(s)	Beth Dobbin; Imani-Lara Lansiquot; Dina Asher-Smith; Daryll Neita	Great Britain	42.29
2nd place, silver medalist(s)	Sade McCreath; Khamica Bingham; Jacqueline Madogo; Leya Buchanan	Canada	43.03
3rd place, bronze medalist(s)	Magdalena Stefanowicz; Klaudia Adamek; Marika Popowicz-Drapała; Marlena Granaszewska	Poland	43.81
4	Rebecca Matheson; Alisha Rees; Sarah Malone; Taylah Spence	Great Britain	44.75
5	Hannah Brier; Amy Odunaiya; Mica Moore; Issie Tustin	Great Britain	44.85
	Demi van den Wildenberg; Zoë Sedney; Minke Bisschops; Naomi Sedney	Netherlands	DNF

=== National Events ===
Men's 100m (−0.5 m/s)
Place	Athlete	Country	Time
1st place, gold medalist(s)	Jeremiah Azu	Great Britain	10.19
2nd place, silver medalist(s)	Aaron Brown	Canada	10.23
3rd place, bronze medalist(s)	Sam Gordon	Great Britain	10.44
4	Adam Thomas	Great Britain	10.45
5	Taymir Burnet	Netherlands	10.47
6	Brendon Rodney	Canada	10.47
7	Xavi Mo-Ajok	Netherlands	10.49
8	Joris van Gool	Netherlands	10.58
9	Dewi Hammond	Great Britain	10.63

Men's 400m
Place	Athlete	Country	Time
1st place, gold medalist(s)	Joe Brier	Great Britain	46.21
2nd place, silver medalist(s)	Kevin Metzger	Great Britain	46.55
3rd place, bronze medalist(s)	Ben Higgins	Great Britain	46.59
4	Lewis Davey	Great Britain	46.62
5	Cameron Chalmers	Great Britain	46.69
6	Rabah Yousif	Great Britain	47.62
7	Lee Thompson	Great Britain	47.65
8	Efekemo Okoro	Great Britain	48.04
	Jamal Rhoden-Stevens	Great Britain	DQ

Men's 800m
Place	Athlete	Country	Time
1st place, gold medalist(s)	Ben Pattison	Great Britain	1:49.21
2nd place, silver medalist(s)	Jamie Webb	Great Britain	1:49.92
3rd place, bronze medalist(s)	Kyle Langford	Great Britain	1:49.94
4	Luke McCann	Ireland	1:50.43
5	Rocco Zaman-Browne	Great Britain	1:50.45
6	Archie Davis	Great Britain	1:50.81
7	Guy Learmonth	Great Britain	1:51.43
8	Daniel Howells	Great Britain	1:51.72
9	Thomas Randolph	Great Britain	1:54.56
	Luca Bigg	Great Britain	DNF

Men's 3000mSC
Place	Athlete	Country	Time
1st place, gold medalist(s)	William Battershill	Great Britain	8:36.56
2nd place, silver medalist(s)	Daniel Jarvis	Great Britain	8:37.58
3rd place, bronze medalist(s)	Ieuan Thomas	Great Britain	8:56.75
4	Ben Thomas	Great Britain	9:04.23
5	George Phillips	Great Britain	9:18.28
6	Alex Alston	Great Britain	9:29.64
	Mark Pearce	Great Britain	DNF

Women's 100m (+0.3 m/s)
Place	Athlete	Country	Time
1st place, gold medalist(s)	Gabrielle Thomas	United States	11.27
2nd place, silver medalist(s)	Khamica Bingham	Canada	11.28
3rd place, bronze medalist(s)	Mikiah Brisco	United States	11.29
4	Imani-Lara Lansiquot	Great Britain	11.43
5	Hannah Brier	Great Britain	11.52
6	Kristal Awuah	Great Britain	11.60
7	Bianca Williams	Great Britain	11.61
8	Desirèe Henry	Great Britain	11.62
9	Alisha Rees	Great Britain	11.64

Women's 400m
Place	Athlete	Country	Time
1st place, gold medalist(s)	Zoey Clark	Great Britain	51.88
2nd place, silver medalist(s)	Ama Pipi	Great Britain	52.57
3rd place, bronze medalist(s)	Yemi Mary John	Great Britain	53.04
4	Lily Florence Beckford	Great Britain	53.46
5	Hannah Williams	Great Britain	53.72
6	Amy Hillyard	Great Britain	54.31
7	Carys McAulay	Great Britain	54.35

Women's 800m
Place	Athlete	Country	Time
1st place, gold medalist(s)	Isabelle Boffey	Great Britain	2:01.30
2nd place, silver medalist(s)	Abigail Ives	Great Britain	2:01.88
3rd place, bronze medalist(s)	Ellie Baker	Great Britain	2:02.14
4	Jenny Selman	Great Britain	2:03.02
5	Brooke Feldmeier	United States	2:03.77
6	Iris Downes	Great Britain	2:04.63
7	Jill Cherry	Great Britain	2:04.98
8	Georgie Hartigan	Ireland	2:05.11
9	Sabrina Sinha	Great Britain	2:07.65
	Jessica Tappin	Great Britain	DNF

== See also ==
- 2022 Diamond League
- 2022 Weltklasse Zürich (Diamond League final)
