= 2019 Diamond League =

- Edition: 10th
- Dates: 3 May – 6 September
- Events: 32
- Meetings: 14
- Individual Prize Money (US$): US$ 9 million

The 2019 Diamond League was the tenth season of the annual series of outdoor track and field meetings, organised by the International Association of Athletics Federations (IAAF). It featured fourteen meetings, with the final two meetings serving as the series finals. It is the third edition to feature the new championship-style system.

== Schedule ==
The following fourteen meetings are scheduled to be included in the 2019 season:

Leg	Date	Meet	Stadium	City	Country	Events (M+W)
1	3 May	Doha Diamond League	Khalifa International Stadium	Doha	Qatar	7 + 7 = 14
2	18 May	IAAF Diamond League Shanghai	Shanghai Stadium	Shanghai	China	8 + 7 = 15
3	30 May	Bauhausgalan	Stockholm Olympic Stadium	Stockholm	Sweden	7 + 6 = 13
4	6 June	Golden Gala – Pietro Mennea	Stadio Olimpico	Rome	Italy	7 + 7 = 14
5	13 June	Oslo Bislett Games	Bislett Stadium	Oslo	Norway	6 + 7 = 13
6	16 June	Meeting International Mohammed VI d'Athlétisme de Rabat	Prince Moulay Abdellah Stadium	Rabat	Morocco	7 + 6 = 13
7	30 June	Prefontaine Classic	Cobb Track and Angell Field	Stanford	United States	7 + 6 = 13
8	5 July	Athletissima	Stade Olympique de la Pontaise	Lausanne	Switzerland	7 + 7 = 14
9	12 July	Herculis	Stade Louis II	Monaco	Monaco	7 + 6 = 13
10	20–21 July	Müller Anniversary Games	London Stadium	London	United Kingdom	6 + 9 = 15
11	18 August	Müller Grand Prix Birmingham	Alexander Stadium	Birmingham	United Kingdom	5 + 8 = 13
12	24 August	Meeting de Paris	Stade Sébastien Charléty	Paris	France	8 + 6 = 14
13	29 August	Weltklasse Zürich	Letzigrund	Zürich	Switzerland	8 + 8 = 16
14	6 September	AG Memorial Van Damme	King Baudouin Stadium	Brussels	Belgium	8 + 8 = 16

=== Calendar ===
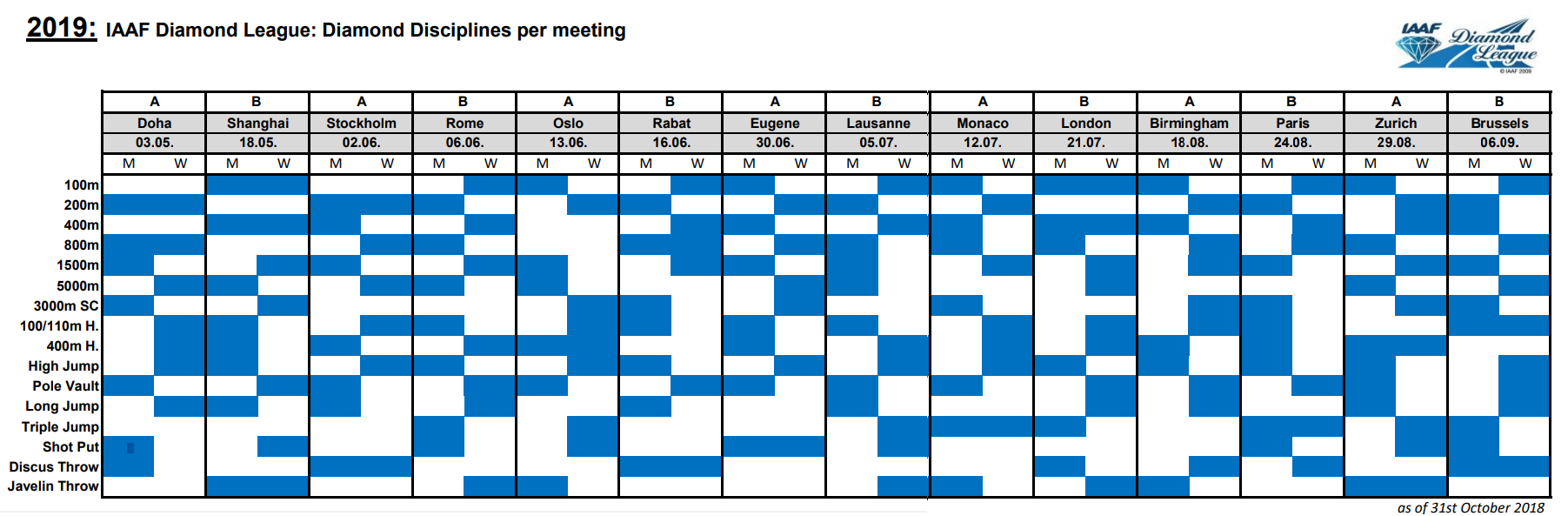

== Season overview ==
- Events held at Diamond League meets, but not included in the Diamond League points race, are marked in grey background.
- Diamond league final winners are marked with light blue background.

=== Men ===
==== Track ====
#	Meeting	100 m	200 m	400 m	800 m	1500 m	5000 m	110 m h	400 m h	3000 m st
1	Doha	-	Ramil Guliyev (TUR); 19.99 SB	-	Nijel Amos (BOT); 1:44.29 WL	Elijah Manangoi (KEN); 3:32.21 WL	-	-	-	Soufiane El Bakkali (MAR); 8:07.22 WL
2	Shanghai	Noah Lyles (USA); 9.86 WL PB	Aaron Brown (CAN); 20.07 SB	Fred Kerley (USA); 44.81 SB	-	-	Yomif Kejelcha (ETH); 13:04.16 WL	Omar McLeod (JAM); 13.12 SB	Abderrahman Samba (QAT); 47.27 WL MR	-
3	Stockholm	-	Aaron Brown (CAN); 20.06 SB	Michael Norman (USA); 44.53	Amel Tuka (BIH); 1:46.68	Timothy Cheruiyot (KEN); 3:35.79	Rhonex Kipruto (KEN); 26:50.16 WL MR PB (10,000m)	-	Karsten Warholm (NOR); 47.85	-
4	Rome	-	Michael Norman (USA); 19.70 WL, MR, PB	-	Donavan Brazier (USA); 1:43.63 WL	-	Telahun Haile Bekele (ETH); 12:52.98 WL, PB	Sergey Shubenkov (ANA); 13.26 SB	Rai Benjamin (USA); 47.58 SB	Benjamin Kigen (KEN); 8:06.13 WL, PB
5	Oslo	Christian Coleman (USA); 9.85 WL	-	-	Ryan Sánchez (PUR); 1:46.34	Marcin Lewandowski (POL); 3:52.34 WL NR (Dream Mile)	Selemon Barega (ETH); 7:32.17 WL PB (3,000m)	-	Karsten Warholm (NOR); 47.33 AR MR PB	-
6	Rabat	-	Andre De Grasse (CAN); 20.19 SB	-	Nijel Amos (BOT); 1:45.57	Vincent Kibet (KEN); 3:35.80	Edward Zakayo (KEN); 13:11.49	Sergey Shubenkov (ANA); 13.12 =MR SB	-	Getnet Wale (ETH); 8:06.01 WL NR PB
7	Stanford	Christian Coleman (USA); 9.81 WL	-	Michael Norman (USA); 44.62	-	Timothy Cheruiyot (KEN); 3:50.49 WL (mile)	Joshua Cheptegei (UGA); 8:07.54 PB WL (2 miles)	Orlando Ortega (ESP); 13.24 SB	Rai Benjamin (USA); 47.16 WL MR	-
8	Lausanne	Justin Gatlin (USA); 9.92	Noah Lyles (USA); 19.50 WL MR PB	-	Wyclife Kinyamal (KEN); 1:43.78 SB	Timothy Cheruiyot (KEN); 3:28.77 WL MR	Yomif Kejelcha (ETH); 13:00.56 SB	Orlando Ortega (ESP); 13.05 SB	Luke Campbell (GER); 49.54 SB	-
9	Monaco	Justin Gatlin (USA); 9.91	-	Steven Gardiner (BAH); 44.51	Nijel Amos (BOT); 1:41.89 WL MR	Timothy Cheruiyot (KEN); 3:29.97	-	-	-	Soufiane El Bakkali (MAR); 8:04.82 WL
10	London	Akani Simbine (RSA); 9.93 SB	Xie Zhenye (CHN); 19.88 AR PB	Akeem Bloomfield (JAM); 44.40 SB	Ferguson Cheruiyot Rotich (KEN); 1:43.14	Samuel Tefera (ETH); 3:49.45 WL PB (mile)	Hagos Gebrhiwet (ETH); 13:01.86	Xie Wenjun (CHN); 13.28	Karsten Warholm (NOR); 47.12 AR WL MR PB	-
11	Birmingham	Yohan Blake (JAM); 10.07	-	Akeem Bloomfield (JAM); 45.04	Mark English (IRL); 1:45.94 SB	Ronald Musagala (UGA); 3:35.12	-	Omar McLeod (JAM); 13.21	Yasmani Copello (TUR); 49.08	-
12	Paris	Hassan Taftian (IRI); 10.03 =NR, =PB	Noah Lyles (USA); 19.65 MR	-	Brandon McBride (CAN); 1:43.78 SB	Ronald Musagala (UGA); 3:30.58 =NR, =PB	-	Daniel Roberts (USA); 13.08	Karsten Warholm (NOR); 47.26	Soufiane El Bakkali (MAR); 8:06.64
13	Zürich	Noah Lyles (USA); 9.98	-	-	Donavan Brazier (USA); 1:42.70 PB	-	Joshua Cheptegei (UGA); 12:57.41 PB	Pascal Martinot-Lagarde (FRA); 13.51	Karsten Warholm (NOR); 46.92 AR WL DLR MR PB	-
14	Brussels	-	Noah Lyles (USA); 19.74	Michael Norman (USA); 44.26	-	Timothy Cheruiyot (KEN); 3:30.22	-	Orlando Ortega (ESP); 13.22	-	Getnet Wale (ETH); 8:06.92

==== Field ====
#	Meeting	Long jump	Triple jump	High jump	Pole vault	Shot put	Discus	Javelin
1	Doha	-	-	-	Sam Kendricks (USA); 5.80 =SB	Ryan Crouser (USA); 22.13	Daniel Ståhl (SWE); 70.56 WL, DLR, MR	-
2	Shanghai	Tajay Gayle (JAM); 8.24	-	Wang Yu (CHN); 2.28 SB	-	-	-	Andreas Hofmann (GER); 87.55 WL
3	Stockholm	Tobias Montler (SWE); 8.22 PB	-	-	Sam Kendricks (USA); 5.72	Wictor Petersson (SWE); 20.11	Daniel Ståhl (SWE); 69.57	-
4	Rome	-	Omar Craddock (USA); 17.50	Bohdan Bondarenko (UKR); 2.31 =WL	-	Konrad Bukowiecki (POL); 21.97 MR, PB	-	-
5	Oslo	-	-	-	Sam Kendricks (USA); 5.91 =SB	-	-	Johannes Vetter (GER); 85.27
6	Rabat	Juan Miguel Echevarría (CUB); 8.34 SB	-	Bohdan Bondarenko (UKR); 2.28	-	-	Fedrick Dacres (JAM); 70.78 WL, DLR, MR, NR, PB	-
7	Stanford	-	-	-	Armand Duplantis (SWE); 5.93	Darlan Romani (BRA); 22.61 PB AR MR, DLR	-	-
8	Lausanne	Juan Miguel Echevarría (CUB); 8.32	-	-	Piotr Lisek (POL); 6.01 WL MR NR PB	-	-	-
9	Monaco	-	Christian Taylor (USA); 17.82 MR SB	-	Piotr Lisek (POL); 6.02 WL MR NR PB	-	-	Andreas Hofmann (GER); 87.84
10	London	Luvo Manyonga (RSA); 8.37 SB	Pedro Pablo Pichardo (POR); 17.53 SB	Majd Eddin Ghazal (SYR); 2.30	-	-	Daniel Ståhl (SWE); 68.56 MR	-
11	Birmingham	-	-	Brandon Starc (AUS); 2.30 SB	-	-	-	Cheng Chao-tsun (TPE); 87.75 SB
12	Paris	-	Will Claye (USA); 18.06 =MR	Michael Mason (CAN); 2.28	Sam Kendricks (USA); 6.00 =MR	Tom Walsh (NZL); 22.44 MR, SB	-	-
13	Zürich	Juan Miguel Echevarría (CUB); 8.65 WL DLR MR	-	Andriy Protsenko (UKR); 2.32 SB	Sam Kendricks (USA); 5.93	-	-	Magnus Kirt (EST); 89.13
14	Brussels	-	Christian Taylor (USA); 17.85w	-	-	Tom Walsh (NZL); 22.30	Daniel Ståhl (SWE); 68.68	-

=== Women ===
==== Track ====
#	Meeting	100 m	200 m	400 m	800 m	1500 m	5000 m	100 m h	400 m h	3000 m st
1	Doha	-	Dina Asher-Smith (GBR); 22.26 WL	-	Caster Semenya (RSA); 1:54.98 WL, MR	-	Hellen Obiri (KEN); 8:25.60 WL (3000m)	Danielle Williams (JAM); 12.66 SB	Dalilah Muhammad (USA); 53.61 WL, MR	-
2	Shanghai	Aleia Hobbs (USA); 11.03 SB	-	Salwa Eid Naser (BHR); 50.65 SB	-	Rababe Arafi (MAR); 4:01.15 WL	-	-	-	Beatrice Chepkoech (KEN); 9:04.53 WL MR
3	Stockholm	-	Dina Asher-Smith (GBR); 22.18 WL	-	Ajeé Wilson (USA); 2:00.87	Laura Muir (GBR); 4:05.37	Agnes Tirop (KEN); 14:50.82 WL	Kendra Harrison (USA); 12.52	-	-
4	Rome	Elaine Thompson (JAM); 10.89 WL	-	Salwa Eid Naser (BHR); 50.26 SB	-	Genzebe Dibaba (ETH); 3:56.28 WL	-	-	Dalilah Muhammad (USA); 53.67	-
5	Oslo	-	Dafne Schippers (NED); 22.56 SB	-	Halimah Nakaayi (UGA); 2:01.93	-	-	Christina Clemons (USA); 12.69	Sydney McLaughlin (USA); 54.16	Norah Jeruto (KEN); 9:03.71 WL MR
6	Rabat	Blessing Okagbare (NGR); 11.05 SB	-	Salwa Eid Naser (BHR); 50.13 SB	Nelly Jepkosgei (KEN); 1:59.50	Genzebe Dibaba (ETH); 3:55.47 WL MR	-	-	-	-
7	Stanford	Marie-Josée Ta Lou (CIV); 11.02 SB	Blessing Okagbare (NGR); 22.05 SB	-	Caster Semenya (RSA); 1:55.70 MR	Faith Kipyegon (KEN); 3:59.04 SB	Sifan Hassan (NED); 8:18.49 WL AR PB MR DLR (3000m)	-	-	Beatrice Chepkoech (KEN); 8:55.58 WL MR
8	Lausanne	Shelly-Ann Fraser-Pryce (JAM); 10.74	Gabrielle Thomas (USA); 22.69 SB	Salwa Eid Naser (BHR); 49.17 MR SB	Nelly Jepkosgei (KEN); 1:59.54	-	-	-	Shamier Little (USA); 53.73 SB	-
9	Monaco	-	Shaunae Miller-Uibo (BAH); 22.09 SB	-	Ajeé Wilson (USA); 1:57.73 SB	Sifan Hassan (NED); 4:12.33 WR (mile)	-	Kendra Harrison (USA); 12.43 SB	Sydney McLaughlin (USA); 53.32 WL	-
10	London	Shelly-Ann Fraser-Pryce (JAM); 10.78	Elaine Thompson (JAM); 22.13	Shericka Jackson (JAM); 50.69	Lynsey Sharp (GBR); 1:58.61 SB	Laura Muir (GBR); 3:58.25	Hellen Obiri (KEN); 14:20.36 WL MR	Danielle Williams (JAM); 12.32 WL NR PB	Rushell Clayton (JAM); 54.16 PB	-
11	Birmingham	Tatjana Pinto (GER); 11.15	Shaunae Miller-Uibo (BAH); 22.24	-	Ajeé Wilson (USA); 2:00.76	Konstanze Klosterhalfen (GER); 4:21.11 MR NR PB (mile)	-	Danielle Williams (JAM); 12.46 =MR	-	Beatrice Chepkoech (KEN); 9:05.55 MR
12	Paris	Elaine Thompson (JAM); 10.98	-	Stephenie Ann McPherson (JAM); 51.11	Hanna Green (USA); 1:58.39	-	-	-	-	-
13	Zürich	Jonielle Smith (JAM); 11.25	Shaunae Miller-Uibo (BAH); 21.74 WL DLR NR PB	Salwa Eid Naser (BHR); 50.24	Eunice Sum (KEN); 2:00.40 SB	Sifan Hassan (NED); 3:57.08	-	-	Sydney McLaughlin (USA); 52.85 SB	Beatrice Chepkoech (KEN); 9:01.71
14	Brussels	Dina Asher-Smith (GBR); 10.88	-	-	Ajeé Wilson (USA); 2:00.24	-	Sifan Hassan (NED); 14:26.26	Danielle Williams (JAM); 12.46	-	-

==== Field ====
#	Meeting	Long jump	Triple jump	High jump	Pole vault	Shot put	Discus	Javelin
1	Doha	Caterine Ibargüen (COL); 6.76 SB	-	Yaroslava Mahuchikh (UKR); 1.96 PB	-	-	-	-
2	Shanghai	-	-	-	Katerina Stefanidi (GRE); 4.72 SB	Chase Ealey (USA); 19.58	-	Lu Huihui (CHN); 66.89 MR
3	Stockholm	-	-	Mariya Lasitskene (ANA); 1.92	Angelica Bengtsson (SWE); 4.57 SB	Aliona Dubitskaya (BLR); 18.49	Denia Caballero (CUB); 65.10	-
4	Rome	Malaika Mihambo (GER); 7.07 WL, PB	-	-	Angelica Bengtsson (SWE); 4.76 NR, PB	-	-	Lu Huihui (CHN); 66.47
5	Oslo	-	Caterine Ibargüen (COL); 14.79 WL	Mariya Lasitskene (ANA); 2.01 WL	-	Gong Lijiao (CHN); 19.51	-	Kathryn Mitchell (AUS); 56.07
6	Rabat	-	-	-	Sandi Morris (USA); 4.82 MR SB	-	Yaime Pérez (CUB); 68.28 MR SB	-
7	Stanford	-	-	Mariya Lasitskene (ANA); 2.04 MR	-	Gong Lijiao (CHN); 19.79	-	-
8	Lausanne	-	Caterine Ibargüen (COL); 14.89 SB	Mariya Lasitskene (ANA); 2.02	Katie Nageotte (USA); 4.82 PB	Christina Schwanitz (GER); 19.04	-	Christin Hussong (GER); 66.59 SB
9	Monaco	-	Yulimar Rojas (VEN); 14.98	Mariya Lasitskene (ANA); 2.00	-	-	-	-
10	London	Malaika Mihambo (GER); 7.02 MR	-	-	Anzhelika Sidorova (ANA); 4.75	-	-	Tatsiana Khaladovich (BLR); 66.10
11	Birmingham	Nafissatou Thiam (BEL); 6.86 NR PB	-	-	Katerina Stefanidi (GRE); 4.75	-	Yaime Pérez (CUB); 64.87	-
12	Paris	-	Yulimar Rojas (VEN); 15.05	-	Alysha Newman (CAN); 4.82 NR PB	-	Denia Caballero (CUB); 66.91	-
13	Zürich	-	Shanieka Ricketts (JAM); 14.93 PB	-	Anzhelika Sidorova (ANA); 4.87	Gong Lijiao (CHN); 20.31 WL MR	-	Lu Huihui (CHN); 66.88
14	Brussels	Malaika Mihambo (GER); 7.03	-	Mariya Lasitskene (ANA); 1.99	Katerina Stefanidi (GRE); 4.83	-	Yaime Pérez (CUB); 68.27	-
