= 2019 Weltklasse Zürich =

Outdoor track and field meeting in Zürich, Switzerland

- Dates: 28–29 August 2019
- Host city: Zürich, Switzerland
- Venue: Letzigrund
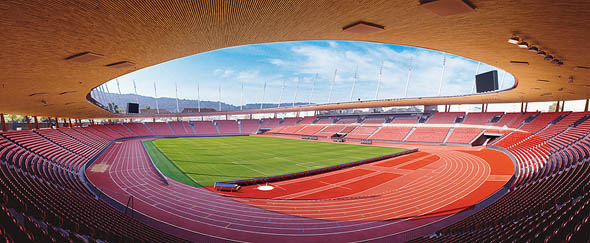
- Level: 2019 IAAF Diamond League
- Events: 29 (16 Diamond League)

The 2019 Weltklasse Zürich was an outdoor track and field meeting in Zürich, Switzerland. Held on 28–29 August at the Letzigrund, it was the thirteenth leg of the 2019 IAAF Diamond League – the highest level international track and field circuit – and the first half of the final for 2019 (the second half being held during the Memorial Van Damme in Brussels, Belgium on 6 September). It was the tenth and last edition of the meet to co-host the Diamond League final with the Memorial Van Damme; the Weltklasse Zürich would exclusively host the final in 2020 but this was canceled due to then ongoing COVID-19 pandemic.

Because of the late World Athletics Championships, the Diamond League final was for the first time held before the World Athletics Championships. Sixteen Diamond League champions (eight men and eight women) were determined and received wildcards to compete at the 2019 World Athletics Championships. Thirteen more events were contested outside the Diamond League.

== Diamond League champions ==
Men		Women	
Athlete	Event	Athlete	Event
Noah Lyles (USA)	100 m	Shaunae Miller-Uibo (BAH)	200 m
Donavan Brazier (USA)	800 m	Salwa Eid Naser (BHR)	400 m
Joshua Cheptegei (UGA)	5000 m	Sifan Hassan (NED)	1500 m
Karsten Warholm (NOR)	400 m hurdles	Sydney McLaughlin (USA)	400 m hurdles
Andriy Protsenko (UKR)	High jump	Beatrice Chepkoech (KEN)	3000 m steeplechase
Sam Kendricks (USA)	Pole vault	Shanieka Ricketts (JAM)	Triple jump
Juan Miguel Echevarría (CUB)	Long jump	Gong Lijao (CHN)	Shot put
Magnus Kirt (EST)	Javelin throw	Lyu Huihui (CHN)	Javelin throw

== Diamond League results ==
=== Men ===
100 m (−0.4 m/s)
Place	Athlete	Time
	Noah Lyles (USA)	9.98
2	Xie Zhenye (CHN)	10.04
3	Yohan Blake (JAM)	10.07
4	Justin Gatlin (USA)	10.08
5	Akani Simbine (RSA)	10.10
6	Zharnel Hughes (GBR)	10.15 (.146)
7	Adam Gemili (GBR)	10.15 (.147)
8	Mike Rodgers (USA)	10.16
9	Alex Wilson (SUI)	10.40

800 m
Place	Athlete	Time
	Donavan Brazier (USA)	1:42.70 PB
2	Nijel Amos (BOT)	1:42.98
3	Brandon McBride (CAN)	1:43.51
4	Emmanuel Korir (KEN)	1:43.69
5	Clayton Murphy (USA)	1:43.94
6	Amel Tuka (BIH)	1:43.99
7	Ferguson Cheruiyot Rotich (KEN)	1:45.28
8	Wycliffe Kinyamal (KEN)	1:47.59
DNF (PM)	Harun Abda (USA)	Did not finish (pacemaker)

5000 m
Place	Athlete	Time
	Joshua Cheptegei (UGA)	12:57.41 PB
2	Hagos Gebrhiwet (ETH)	12:58.15
3	Nicholas Kipkorir Kimeli (KEN)	12:59.05
4	Telahun Haile Bekele (ETH)	12:59.09
5	Selemon Barega (ETH)	12:59.66
6	Yomif Kejelcha (ETH)	13:01.38
7	Stanley Waithaka Mburu (KEN)	13:06.29
8	Paul Chelimo (USA)	13:14.18
9	Ben True (USA)	13:18.27
10	Birhanu Balew (BRN)	13:21.13
11	Andrew Butchart (GBR)	13:24.46
12	Henrik Ingebrigtsen (NOR)	13:30.78
13	Stewart McSweyn (AUS)	13:32.33
14	Julien Wanders (SUI)	13:45.18
DNF	Abadi Hadis (ETH)	Did not finish
DNF (PM)	Ryan Gregson (AUS); Patrick Tiernan (AUS)	Did not finish (pacemakers)

400 m hurdles
Place	Athlete	Time
	Karsten Warholm (NOR)	46.92 WL DLR AR MR
2	Rai Benjamin (USA)	46.98 PB
3	Kyron McMaster (IVB)	48.58 (.578)
4	Yasmani Copello (TUR)	48.58 (.580)
5	David Kendziera (USA)	48.98
6	Thomas Barr (IRL)	49.17
7	TJ Holmes (USA)	50.00
8	Kariem Hussein (SUI)	50.04

High jump
Place	Athlete	Mark
	Andriy Protsenko (UKR)	2.32 m
2	Brandon Starc (AUS)	2.30 m
3	Tihomir Ivanov (BUL)	2.30 m
4	Michael Mason (CAN)	2.27 m
5	Ilya Ivanyuk (ANA); Naoto Tobe (JPN)	2.27 m
7	Jeron Robinson (USA)	2.24 m
8	Maksim Nedasekau (BLR)	2.24 m
9	Wang Yu (CHN)	2.24 m
10	Mutaz Essa Barshim (QAT); Majd Eddin Ghazal (SYR)	2.20 m
12	Mateusz Przybylko (GER)	2.20 m

Pole vault
Place	Athlete	Mark
	Sam Kendricks (USA)	5.93 m
2	Armand Duplantis (SWE)	5.83 m
3	Piotr Lisek (POL); Cole Walsh (USA)	5.83 m 5.83 m PB
5	Renaud Lavillenie (FRA); Chris Nilsen (USA); Paweł Wojciechowski (POL)	5.73 m
8	Thiago Braz (BRA)	5.58 m
9	Ernest Obiena (PHI)	5.58 m
10	Dominik Alberto (SUI)	5.58 m PB
11	Seito Yamamoto (JPN)	5.58 m
12	Valentin Lavillenie (FRA)	5.43 m
13	Emmanouil Karalis (GRE)	5.43 m

Long jump
Place	Athlete	Mark
	Juan Miguel Echevarría (CUB)	8.65 m (−0.5 m/s) WL DLR MR
2	Ruswahl Samaai (RSA)	8.20 m (±0.0 m/s)
3	Tajay Gayle (JAM)	8.20 m (−0.6 m/s)
4	Luvo Manyonga (RSA)	8.19 m (−0.4 m/s)
5	Miltiadis Tentoglou (GRE)	8.10 m (−0.2 m/s)
6	Wang Jianan (CHN)	8.06 m (−0.1 m/s)
7	Thobias Montler (SWE)	7.80 m (−0.7 m/s)
8	Zarck Visser (RSA)	7.60 m (−0.3 m/s)

Javelin throw
Place	Athlete	Mark
	Magnus Kirt (EST)	89.13 m
2	Cheng Chao-tsun (TPE)	89.05 m
3	Andreas Hofmann (GER)	87.49 m
4	Marcin Krukowski (POL)	85.72 m
5	Johannes Vetter (GER)	84.46 m
6	Jakub Vadlejch (CZE)	84.17 m
7	Thomas Röhler (GER)	82.91 m
8	Bernhard Seifert (GER)	75.88 m
9	Simon Wieland (SUI)	74.36 m

=== Women ===
200 m (−0.4 m/s)
Place	Athlete	Time
	Shaunae Miller-Uibo (BAH)	21.78 WL DLR NR
2	Dina Asher-Smith (GBR)	22.08
3	Elaine Thompson (JAM)	22.44
4	Dafne Schippers (NED)	22.46
5	Mujinga Kambundji (SUI)	22.58
6	Blessing Okagbare (NGR)	22.62
7	Crystal Emmanuel (CAN)	22.87
8	Jamile Samuel (NED)	23.15

400 m
Place	Athlete	Time
	Salwa Eid Naser (BHR)	50.24
2	Shakima Wimbley (USA)	51.21
3	Lisanne de Witte (NED)	51.30
4	Justyna Święty-Ersetic (POL)	51.54
5	Laviai Nielsen (GBR)	51.70
6	Stephenie Ann McPherson (JAM)	51.90
7	Kendall Ellis (USA)	51.92
8	Jessica Beard (USA)	52.60

1500 m
Place	Athlete	Time
	Sifan Hassan (NED)	3:57.08
2	Konstanze Klosterhalfen (GER)	3:59.02
3	Gabriela DeBues-Stafford (CAN)	3:59.59 NR
4	Genzebe Dibaba (ETH)	4:00.86
5	Winnie Nanyondo (UGA)	4:03.08
6	Winny Chebet (KEN)	4:03.11
7	Rababe Arafi (MAR)	4:03.44
8	Jenny Simpson (USA)	4:03.50
9	Gudaf Tsegay (ETH)	4:03.77
10	Linden Hall (AUS)	4:04.22
11	Jemma Reekie (GBR)	4:05.34
12	Eilish McColgan (GBR)	4:08.61
13	Axumawit Embaye (ETH)	4:11.62
14	Delia Sclabas (SUI)	4:15.69
DNF PM	Chanelle Price (USA)	Did not finish (pacemaker)

400 m hurdles
Place	Athlete	Time
	Sydney McLaughlin (USA)	52.85
2	Shamier Little (USA)	53.86
3	Dalilah Muhammad (USA)	54.13
4	Zuzana Hejnová (CZE)	54.75
5	Léa Sprunger (SUI)	55.14
6	Hanna Ryzhykova (UKR)	55.28
7	Janieve Russell (JAM)	55.87
8	Ashley Spencer (USA)	56.90

3000 m steeplechase
Place	Athlete	Time
	Beatrice Chepkoech (KEN)	9:01.71
2	Hyvin Kiyeng (KEN)	9:03.93
3	Norah Jeruto (KEN)	9:05.15
4	Daisy Jepkemei (KEN)	9:06.66 PB
5	Gesa Felicitas Krause (GER)	9:07.51 NR
6	Emma Coburn (USA)	9:10.01
7	Winfred Yavi (BHR)	9:14.84
8	Celliphine Chepteek Chespol (KEN)	9:20.04
9	Karoline Bjerkeli Grøvdal (NOR)	9:20.69
10	Mercy Chepkurui (KEN)	9:29.61
11	Maruša Mišmaš (SLO)	9:53.49
DNF	Geneviève Lalonde (CAN)	Did not finish
DNF (PM)	Caroline Tuigong (KEN)	Did not finish (pacemaker)

Triple jump
Place	Athlete	Mark
	Shanieka Ricketts (JAM)	14.93 m (±0.0 m/s) PB
2	Yulimar Rojas (VEN)	14.74 m (+0.1 m/s)
3	Liadagmis Povea (CUB)	14.49 m (−0.4 m/s)
4	Keturah Orji (USA)	14.43 m (+0.5 m/s)
5	Paraskevi Papachristou (GRE)	14.33 m (±0.0 m/s)
6	Patrícia Mamona (USA)	14.24 m (−0.4 m/s)
7	Kimberly Williams (JAM)	14.10 m (−0.6 m/s)
8	Ana Peleteiro (ESP)	14.06 m (−0.2 m/s)

Shot put
Place	Athlete	Mark
	Gong Lijao (CHN)	20.31 m WL MR
2	Chase Ealey (USA)	19.68 m PB
3	Christina Schwanitz (GBR)	19.37 m
4	Aliona Dubitskaya (BLR)	19.21 m =PB
5	Brittany Crew (CAN)	18.86 m
6	Danniel Thomas-Dodd (JAM)	18.80 m
7	Fanny Roos (SWE)	18.74 m
8	Jessica Ramsey (USA)	18.27 m

Javelin throw
Place	Athlete	Mark
	Lyu Huihui (CHN)	66.88 m
2	Kelsey-Lee Barber (AUS)	64.74 m
3	Nikola Ogrodníková (CZE)	63.05 m
4	Christin Hussong (GER)	62.81 m
5	Barbora Špotáková (CZE)	62.25 m
6	Eda Tuğsuz (TUR)	61.81 m
7	Līna Mūze (LAT)	61.60 m
8	Tatsiana Khaladovich (BLR)	60.99 m
9	Géraldine Ruckstuhl (SUI)	51.05 m

== Non-Diamond League results ==
=== Men ===
400m Hurdles
Place	Athlete	Time
1	Efekemo Okoro	49.34 PB
2	Luke Campbell	49.80
3	Joshua Abuaku	50.42
4	Dany Brand	50.48
5	Joshua Faulds	50.84 PB
6	Nout Wardenburg	50.96 SB
7	Julien Bonvin	51.10
8	Mattia Tajana	51.69

== See also ==
- 2019 Meeting de Paris (previous Diamond League meet)
- 2019 Memorial Van Damme (next Diamond League meet)
