= Efekemo Okoro =

British athlete (born 1992)

Personal information
- Nationality: British (English)
- Born: 21 February 1992 (age 34) Birmingham, England

Sport
- Sport: Athletics
- Event: Sprints
- Club: Birchfield Harriers

Achievements and titles
- Personal best(s): 400 m: 45.47 (Leuven, 2024); 400m hurdles: 48.89 (Manchester, 2024); Indoors; 400 m: 46.72 (Apeldoorn, 2025)

Efekemo Kieran Okoro (born 21 February 1992) is a British sprinter. He competed for Great Britain in the individual 400 metres and the men's 4 x 400 metres relay at the 2025 European Athletics Indoor Championships.

== Biography ==
Okoro is from Great Barr in the West Midlands and is a member of the Birchfield Harriers. He was named in the British relay team for the 2018 IAAF World Indoor Championships in Birmingham, England. He was named in the British squad for the 2021 World Athletics Relays held in Chorzów, Poland.

He finished third in the 400 metres hurdles at the 2024 British Athletics Championships. He ran an indoors personal best of 46.72 seconds in the individual 400 metres in February 2025 in Apeldoorn, Netherlands. He was selected for the British team for the 2025 European Athletics Indoor Championships also held in Apeldoorn, Netherlands. He ran in the men's 4 x 400 metres relay alongside Joshua Faulds, Alex Haydock-Wilson and Alastair Chalmers, in which they placed fourth overall.

He was named in the British team for the 2025 World Athletics Relays in Guangzhou, China in May 2025. He ran in the men’s 4 x 400 metres relay, alongside Charlie Dobson, Toby Harries and Rio Mitcham as the British quartet finished a close second to Belgium in their heat to qualify for the final and secure a place for Britain at the 2025 World Championships.

On 2 August, he qualified for the final of the 400 metres hurdles at the 2025 UK Athletics Championships in Birmingham.
