= 2019 Memorial Van Damme =

- Dates: 5–6 September
- Host city: Brussels, Belgium
- Venue: King Baudouin Stadium
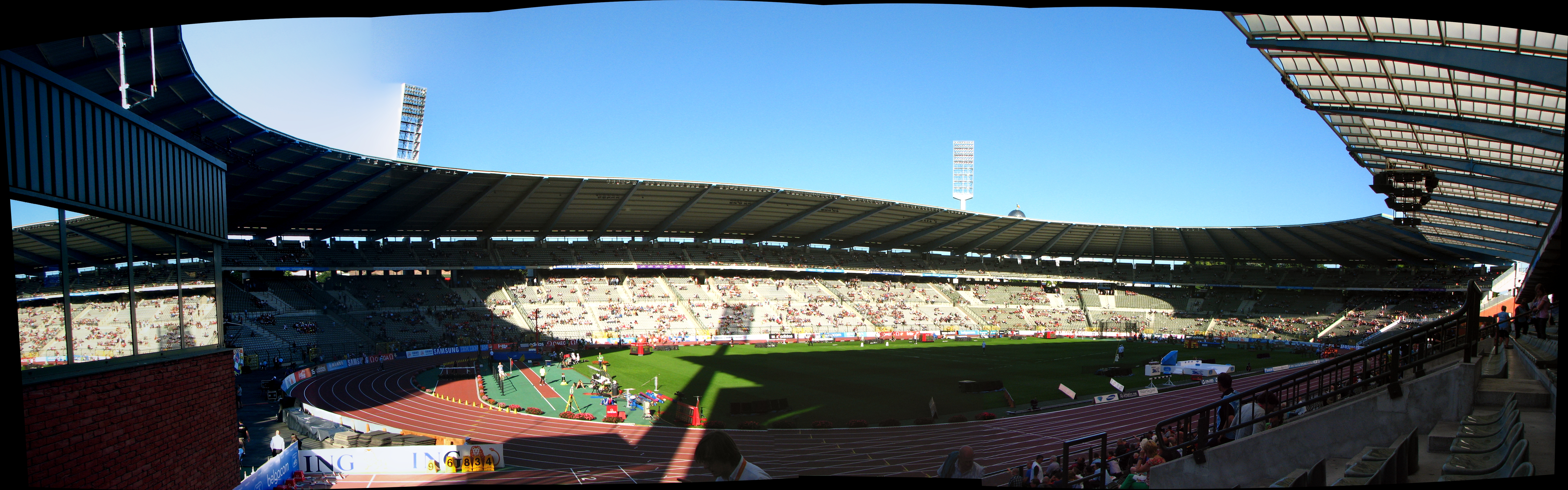
- Level: 2019 IAAF Diamond League
- Events: 34 (16 Diamond League)

The 2019 Memorial Van Damme was the 43rd edition of the annual track and field meeting in Brussels, Belgium. Held on 5–6 September at the King Baudouin Stadium, it was the fourteenth leg of the 2019 IAAF Diamond League – the highest level international track and field circuit – and the second half of the final for 2019 (the first half being held during the Weltklasse Zürich in Zürich, Switzerland on 29 August). It was the tenth and last edition of the meet to co-host the Diamond League final with the Weltklasse Zürich; The Weltklasse Zürich will exclusively host the final in 2020.

Because of the late World Athletics Championships, the Diamond League final was for the first time held before the World Athletics Championships in the same year. 16 Diamond League champions (8 men and 8 women) were determined and received wild cards to compete at the 2019 World Athletics Championships. 18 more events were contested outside the Diamond League.

== Diamond League champions ==
Men		Women	
Athlete	Event	Athlete	Event
Noah Lyles (USA)	200 m	Dina Asher-Smith (GBR)	100 m
Michael Norman (USA)	400 m	Ajeé Wilson (USA)	800 m
Timothy Cheruiyot (KEN)	1500 m	Sifan Hassan (NED)	5000 m
Orlando Ortega (ESP)	110 m hurdles	Danielle Williams (JAM)	100 m hurdles
Getnet Wale (ETH)	3000 m steeplechase	Mariya Lasitskene (ANA)	High jump
Christian Taylor (USA)	Triple jump	Katerina Stefanidi (GRE)	Pole vault
Tomas Walsh (NZL)	Shot put	Malaika Mihambo (GER)	Long jump
Daniel Ståhl (SWE)	Discus throw	Yaime Pérez (CUB)	Discus throw

== Diamond League results ==
=== Men ===
200 m (+0.8 m/s)
Place	Athlete	Time
	Noah Lyles (USA)	19.74
2	Ramil Guliyev (TUR)	19.86
3	Andre De Grasse (CAN)	19.87
4	Aaron Brown (CAN)	20.00
5	Álex Quiñónez (ECU)	20.25
6	Robin Vanderbemden (BEL)	20.51
7	Jereem Richards (TTO)	20.53
8	Alonso Edward (PAN)	28.80
DQ	Bernardo Baloyes (COL)	Disqualified

400 m
Place	Athlete	Time
	Michael Norman (USA)	44.26
2	Fred Kerley (USA)	44.46
3	Akeem Bloomfield (JAM)	44.67
4	Obi Igbokwe (USA)	44.96
5	Kahmari Montgomery (USA)	45.31
6	Michael Cherry (USA)	45.55
7	Jonathan Sacoor (BEL)	45.72
8	Nathon Allen (JAM)	46.17
9	Nathan Strother (USA)	47.04

1500 m
Place	Athlete	Time
	Timothy Cheruiyot (KEN)	3:30.22
2	Jakob Ingebrigtsen (NOR)	3:31.62
3	Filip Ingebrigtsen (NOR)	3:33.33
4	Ronald Musagala (UGA)	3:33.90
5	Craig Engels (USA)	3:34.04 PB
6	Marcin Lewandowski (POL)	3:34.36
7	Ayanleh Souleiman (DJI)	3:35.08
8	John Gregorek (USA)	3:35.32
9	Samuel Tefera (ETH)	3:35.64
10	Bethwell Birgen (KEN)	3:37.48
11	Charles Cheboi Simotwo (KEN)	3:38.06
12	Vincent Kibet (KEN)	3:38.76
13	Ismael Debjani (BEL)	3:40.04
DNF (PM)	Boaz Kiprugot (KEN); Timothy Sein (KEN)	Did not finish (pacemakers)

110 m hurdles (±0.0 m/s)
Place	Athlete	Time
	Orlando Ortega (ESP)	13.22
2	Ronald Levy (JAM)	13.31
3	Sergey Shubenkov (ANA)	13.33
4	Freddie Crittenden (USA)	13.35
5	Xie Wenjun (CHN)	13.49
6	Andrew Pozzi (GBR)	13.50
7	Antonio Alkana (RSA)	13.61
DQ	Michael Obasuyi (BEL)	Disqualified
DNS	Daniel Roberts (USA)	Did not start

3000 m steeplechase
Place	Athlete	Time
	Getnet Wale (ETH)	8:06.92
2	Soufiane El Bakkali (MAR)	8:07.08
3	Lamecha Girma (ETH)	8:07.66 PB
4	Benjamin Kigen (KEN)	8:10.76
5	Hillary Bor (USA)	8:13.90
6	Abraham Kibiwot (KEN)	8:14.52
7	Conseslus Kipruto (KEN)	8:14.53
8	Fernando Carro (ESP)	8:15.53
9	Mohamed Tindouft (MAR)	8:16.58
10	Djilali Bedrani (FRA)	8:16.60
11	Chala Beyo (ETH)	8:16.85
12	Nicholas Kiptanui Bett (KEN)	8:26.95
13	Tim van de Velde (BEL)	8:41.22
DNF (PM)	Lawrence Kemboi Kipsang (KEN); Wilberforce Chemiat Kones (KEN)	Did not finish (pacemakers)

Triple jump
Place	Athlete	Mark
	Christian Taylor (USA)	17.85 m (+2.1 m/s)
2	Will Claye (USA)	17.22 m (+1.1 m/s)
3	Omar Craddock (USA)	17.17 m (−1.9 m/s)
4	Donald Scott (USA)	17.14 m (+1.7 m/s)
5	Alexis Copello (AZE)	17.02 m (+0.3 m/s)
6	Nelson Évora (POR)	16.54 m (−0.6 m/s)
7	Pedro Pablo Pichardo (POR)	16.32 m (+1.0 m/s)
DNS	Hugues Fabrice Zango (BUR)	Did not start

Shot put
Place	Athlete	Mark
	Tomas Walsh (NZL)	22.30 m
2	Darlan Romani (BRA)	22.15 m
3	Ryan Crouser (USA)	22.08 m
4	Konrad Bukowiecki (POL)	21.91 m
5	Darrell Hill (USA)	21.13 m
6	Michał Haratyk (POL)	20.91 m
7	Tomáš Staněk (CZE)	20.86 m
8	Joe Kovacs (USA)	20.60 m

Discus throw
Place	Athlete	Mark
	Daniel Ståhl (SWE)	68.68 m
2	Lukas Weisshaidinger (AUT)	66.03 m
3	Fedrick Dacres (JAM)	65.27 m
4	Andrius Gudžius (LTU)	65.19 m
5	Piotr Małachowski (POL)	64.78 m
6	Ehsan Hadadi (IRI)	64.75 m
7	Ola Stunes Isene (NOR)	64.07 m
8	Christoph Harting (GER)	64.03 m
9	Philip Milanov (BEL)	60.84 m

=== Women ===
100 m (−0.3 m/s)
Place	Athlete	Time
	Dina Asher-Smith (GBR)	10.88
2	Shelly-Ann Fraser-Pryce (JAM)	10.95
3	Marie-Josée Ta Lou (CIV)	11.09
4	Dafne Schippers (NED)	11.22
5	Blessing Okagbare (NGR)	11.24
6	Aleia Hobbs (USA)	11.29
7	Crystal Emmanuel (CAN)	11.38
8	Gina Lückenkemper (GER)	11.45

800 m
Place	Athlete	Time
	Ajeé Wilson (USA)	2:00.24
2	Raevyn Rogers (USA)	2:00.67
3	Winnie Nanyondo (UGA)	2:00.69
4	Olha Lyakhova (UKR)	2:01.16
5	Natoya Goule (JAM)	2:01.40
6	Lynsey Sharp (GBR)	2:01.47
7	Hanna Green (USA)	2:02.47
8	Renée Eykens (BEL)	2:03.20
9	Nelly Jepkosgei (BHR)	2:03.48
DNF (PM)	Noélie Yarigo (BEN)	Did not finish (pacemaker)

5000 m
Place	Athlete	Time
	Sifan Hassan (NED)	14:26.26
2	Letesenbet Gidey (ETH)	14:29.54
3	Konstanze Klosterhalfen (GER)	14:29.89
4	Hellen Obiri (KEN)	14:33.90
5	Margaret Chelimo Kipkemboi (KEN)	14:36.48
6	Agnes Jebet Tirop (KEN)	14:37.32
7	Gabriela DeBues-Stafford (CAN)	14:44.12 NR PB
8	Fantu Worku (ETH)	14:45.59 PB
9	Beatrice Chepkoech (KEN)	14:46.58
10	Caroline Chepkoech Kipkirui (KEN)	14:47.04
11	Eva Cherono (KEN)	14:50.13
DNF (PM)	Camille Buscomb (NZL)	Did not finish (pacemaker)

100 m hurdles (±0.0 m/s)
Place	Athlete	Time
	Danielle Williams (JAM)	12.46
2	Kendra Harrison (USA)	12.73
3	Nia Ali (USA)	12.74
4	Sharika Nelvis (USA)	12.83
5	Christina Clemons (USA)	12.84
6	Cindy Roleder (GER)	13.12 (.111)
7	Elvira Herman (BLR)	13.12 (.119)
DQ	Tobi Amusan (NGR); Anne Zagré (BEL)	Disqualified

High jump
Place	Athlete	Mark
	Mariya Lasitskene (ANA)	1.99 m
2	Yuliya Levchenko (UKR)	1.97 m
3	Nafissatou Thiam (BEL)	1.95 m
4	Kamila Lićwinko (POL)	1.95 m
5	Mirela Demireva (BUL)	1.93 m
6	Yaroslava Mahuchikh (UKR)	1.89 m
7	Nicola McDermott (AUS)	1.89 m
8	Erika Kinsey (SWE)	1.85 m
9	Ana Šimić (CRO)	1.85 m
10	Iryna Gerashchenko (UKR)	1.85 m
11	Karyna Demidik (BLR)	1.85 m
12	Elena Vallortigara (ITA)	1.85 m
13	Levern Spencer (LCA)	1.80 m

Pole vault
Place	Athlete	Mark
	Katerina Stefanidi (GRE)	4.83 m
2	Anzhelika Sidorova (ANA)	4.83 m
3	Alysha Newman (CAN)	4.77 m
4	Katie Nageotte (USA)	4.70 m
5	Holly Bradshaw (GBR)	4.70 m
6	Robeilys Peinado (VEN)	4.70 m
7	Jenn Suhr (USA)	4.70 m
8	Sandi Morris (USA)	4.63 m
9	Yarisley Silva (CUB)	4.63 m
10	Li Ling (CHN)	4.63 m
11	Angelica Bengtsson (SWE)	4.63 m
12	Michaela Meijer (SWE)	4.41 m
NM	Fanny Smets (BEL)	No mark

Long jump
Place	Athlete	Mark
	Malaika Mihambo (GER)	7.03 m (−0.9 m/s)
2	Brittney Reese (USA)	6.85 m (+0.6 m/s)
3	Katarina Johnson-Thompson (GBR)	6.73 m (−0.2 m/s)
4	Maryna Bekh-Romanchuk (UKR)	6.73 m (+0.9 m/s)
5	Lorraine Ugen (GBR)	6.70 m (+1.0 m/s)
6	Yelena Sokolova (ANA)	6.54 m (+1.3 m/s)
7	Brooke Stratton (AUS)	6.53 m (+0.9 m/s)
8	Caterine Ibargüen (COL)	6.26 m (−0.4 m/s)
9	Hanne Maudens (BEL)	5.80 m (+1.1 m/s)

Discus throw
Place	Athlete	Mark
	Yaime Pérez (CUB)	68.27 m
2	Sandra Perković (CRO)	66.00 m
3	Kristin Pudenz (GER)	63.73 m
4	Denia Caballero (CUB)	63.53 m
5	Claudine Vita (GER)	62.15 m
6	Valarie Allman (USA)	61.70 m
7	Nadine Müller (GER)	61.39 m
DNS	Mélina Robert-Michon (FRA)	Did not start

== See also ==
- 2019 Weltklasse Zürich (previous meet and first half of the final in the 2019 IAAF Diamond League)
