= 2006 IAAF World Athletics Tour =

- Edition: 1st
- Start date: 9 March 2006
- End date: 10 September 2006
- Meetings: 24 (+1 final)

The 2006 IAAF World Athletics Tour was the first edition of the annual global circuit of one-day track and field competitions organized by the International Association of Athletics Federations (IAAF). The series featured 24 one-day meetings, consisting of the six meetings of the 2006 IAAF Golden League, six IAAF Super Grand Prix meetings, and twelve IAAF Grand Prix meetings. In addition, there were 25 Area Permit Meetings that carried point-scoring events. The series culminated in the two-day 2006 IAAF World Athletics Final, held in Stuttgart, Germany from 9–10 September.

The series replaced the IAAF World Outdoor Meetings series which had launched in 2003. As part of this change, the IAAF Grand Prix II category was dropped in favour of an Area Permit Meeting structure. In comparison to the preceding year's series, the Herculis meet returned to Super Grand Prix status, having hosted the IAAF World Athletics Final for three years. The British Grand Prix, Golden Spike Ostrava and Meeting de Atletismo Madrid all dropped down from Super to regular Grand Prix status. All previous Grand Prix II meetings were dropped from the main series, with the exception of the Melbourne Track Classic which was promoted to Grand Prix status. The Meeting Grand Prix IAAF de Dakar was included as a Grand Prix for the first time. Among other Grand Prix meets, the Meeting Lille-Métropole and Gugl Grand Prix were demoted to Area Permit Meeting and the Gran Premio Diputación was dropped from the circuit entirely.

== Meetings ==
Number	Date	Meet	City	Country	Level	Events (M+W)
1	9 March	Melbourne Track Classic	Melbourne	Australia	2006 IAAF Grand Prix	
2	29 April	Meeting Grand Prix IAAF de Dakar	Dakar	Senegal	2006 IAAF Grand Prix	
3	6 May	Osaka Grand Prix	Osaka	Japan	2006 IAAF Grand Prix	
4	12 May	Qatar Athletic Super Grand Prix	Doha	Qatar	2006 IAAF Super Grand Prix	
5	21 May	Grande Premio Brasil Caixa de Atletismo	Belém	Brazil	2006 IAAF Grand Prix	
6	28 May	Prefontaine Classic	Eugene	United States	2006 IAAF Grand Prix	
7	28 May	Fanny Blankers-Koen Games	Hengelo	Netherlands	2006 IAAF Grand Prix	
8	30 May	Golden Spike Ostrava	Ostrava	Czech Republic	2006 IAAF Grand Prix	
9	2 June	Bislett Games	Oslo	Norway	2006 IAAF Golden League	
10	11 June	British Grand Prix	Gateshead	United Kingdom	2006 IAAF Grand Prix	
11	3 July	Athens Grand Prix Tsiklitiria	Athens	Greece	2006 IAAF Super Grand Prix	
12	8 July	Meeting Gaz de France	Paris Saint-Denis	France	2006 IAAF Golden League	
13	11 July	Athletissima	Lausanne	Switzerland	2006 IAAF Super Grand Prix	
14	14 July	Golden Gala	Rome	Italy	2006 IAAF Golden League	
15	17 July	Meeting de Atletismo Madrid	Madrid	Spain	2006 IAAF Grand Prix	
16	25 July	DN Galan	Stockholm	Sweden	2006 IAAF Super Grand Prix	
17	26 July	Helsinki Grand Prix	Helsinki	Finland	2006 IAAF Grand Prix	
18	28 July	London Grand Prix	London	United Kingdom	2006 IAAF Super Grand Prix	
19	18 August	Weltklasse Zürich	Zürich	Switzerland	2006 IAAF Golden League	
20	20 August	Herculis	Monte Carlo	Monaco	2006 IAAF Super Grand Prix	
21	25 August	Memorial Van Damme	Brussels	Belgium	2006 IAAF Golden League	
22	27 August	Rieti Meeting	Rieti	Italy	2006 IAAF Grand Prix	
23	31 August	Hanžeković Memorial	Zagreb	Croatia	2006 IAAF Grand Prix	
24	3 September	ISTAF Berlin	Berlin	Germany	2006 IAAF Golden League	
F	9–10 September	2006 IAAF World Athletics Final	Stuttgart	Germany	IAAF World Athletics Final	
