= 2016 Meeting de Paris =

- Dates: 27 August 2016
- Host city: Saint-Denis, France
- Venue: Stade de France
- Level: 2016 Diamond League

The 2016 Meeting de Paris was the 32nd edition of the annual outdoor track and field meeting in Saint-Denis, France. Held on 27 August at Stade de France, it was the twelfth leg of the 2016 Diamond League – the highest level international track and field circuit.

== Diamond events results ==
A revised points system was introduced during the 2016 Diamond League season where athletes earned points towards a season leaderboard (10-6-4-2-1 respectively), points per event were then doubled in the Diamond League Finals. Athletes had to take part in the Diamond race during the finals to be eligible to win the Diamond trophy which is awarded to the athlete with the most points at the end of the season.

=== Men's ===
100 Metres
Rank	Athlete	Nation	Time	Points	Notes
1st place, gold medalist(s)	Ben Youssef Meïté	Ivory Coast	9.96	10	=NR
2nd place, silver medalist(s)	Akani Simbine	South Africa	10.00	6	
3rd place, bronze medalist(s)	Churandy Martina	Netherlands	10.01	4	SB
4	Joel Fearon	Great Britain	10.05	2	
5	Jimmy Vicaut	France	10.12	1	
6	Kim Collins	Saint Kitts and Nevis	10.12		
7	Mike Rodgers	United States	10.14		
8	CJ Ujah	Great Britain	10.15		
			Wind: (−0.1 m/s)		

800 Metres
Rank	Athlete	Nation	Time	Points	Notes
1st place, gold medalist(s)	Alfred Kipketer	Kenya	1:42.87	10	PB
2nd place, silver medalist(s)	Taoufik Makhloufi	Algeria	1:42.98	6	
3rd place, bronze medalist(s)	Jonathan Kitilit	Kenya	1:43.05	4	PB
4	Ferguson Rotich	Kenya	1:43.43	2	SB
5	Ayanleh Souleiman	Djibouti	1:43.52	1	SB
6	Pierre-Ambroise Bosse	France	1:43.58		
7	Marcin Lewandowski	Poland	1:43.73		SB
8	Adam Kszczot	Poland	1:43.76		SB
9	Samir Dahmani	France	1:44.07		PB
10	Nicholas Kipkoech	Kenya	1:46.55		
—	Boris Berian	United States	DNF		
—	Edwin Melly	Kenya	DNF		PM

3000 Metres
Rank	Athlete	Nation	Time	Points	Notes
1st place, gold medalist(s)	Yomif Kejelcha	Ethiopia	7:28.19	10	WU20R, WL
2nd place, silver medalist(s)	Abdalaati Iguider	Morocco	7:30.09	6	PB
3rd place, bronze medalist(s)	Hagos Gebrhiwet	Ethiopia	7:30.45	4	
4	Ryan Hill	United States	7:30.93	2	PB
5	Albert Rop	Bahrain	7:32.02	1	NR
6	Bethwell Birgen	Kenya	7:32.48		PB
7	Muktar Edris	Ethiopia	7:33.28		PB
8	Paul Chelimo	United States	7:37.98		
~~9~~	~~Sadik Mikhou~~	~~Bahrain~~	~~7:39.02~~		DQ (Note: Due to doping violations Mikhou's results during this competition were disqualified.)
10	Thomas Longosiwa	Kenya	7:41.31		
11	Edwin Soi	Kenya	7:43.30		
12	Ryan Gregson	Australia	7:44.90		PB
13	Yoann Kowal	France	7:45.11		PB
14	Paul Tanui	Kenya	7:46.61		PB
15	Cyrus Rutto	Kenya	7:52.24		SB
16	Yemane Haileselassie	Eritrea	7:54.15		
17	Mahiedine Mekhissi-Benabbad	France	8:15.19		
—	Bouabdellah Tahri	France	DNF		
—	Vincent Kipsang Rono	Kenya	DNF		PM
—	Collins Cheboi	Kenya	DNF		PM

400 Metres hurdles
Rank	Athlete	Nation	Time	Points	Notes
1st place, gold medalist(s)	Nicholas Bett	Kenya	48.01	10	SB
2nd place, silver medalist(s)	Kerron Clement	United States	48.19	6	
3rd place, bronze medalist(s)	Yasmani Copello	Turkey	48.24	4	
4	Javier Culson	Puerto Rico	48.55	2	
5	Rasmus Mägi	Estonia	48.66	1	
6	Abdelmalik Lahoulou	Algeria	48.92		
7	Mamadou Kassé Hann	France	49.46		
8	Michael Tinsley	United States	52.11		

Pole vault
Rank	Athlete	Nation	Height	Points	Notes
1st place, gold medalist(s)	Renaud Lavillenie	France	5.93 m	10	
2nd place, silver medalist(s)	Sam Kendricks	United States	5.81 m	6	
3rd place, bronze medalist(s)	Jan Kudlička	Czech Republic	5.71 m	4	
4	Paweł Wojciechowski	Poland	5.71 m	2	=SB
5	Shawn Barber	Canada	5.61 m	1	
6	Konstantinos Filippidis	Greece	5.51 m		
7	Robert Renner	Slovenia	5.36 m		
7	Stanley Joseph	France	5.36 m		
9	Tobias Scherbarth	Germany	5.36 m		
9	Robert Sobera	Poland	5.36 m		

Triple jump
Rank	Athlete	Nation	Distance	Points	Notes
1st place, gold medalist(s)	Chris Carter	United States	16.92 m (+0.7 m/s)	10	
2nd place, silver medalist(s)	Alexis Copello	Azerbaijan	16.90 m (−0.1 m/s)	6	
3rd place, bronze medalist(s)	Jhon Murillo	Colombia	16.90 m (+0.4 m/s)	4	
4	Karol Hoffmann	Poland	16.78 m (+0.9 m/s)	2	
5	Troy Doris	Guyana	16.68 m (+0.3 m/s)	1	
6	Benjamin Compaoré	France	16.59 m (−0.1 m/s)		
7	Chris Benard	United States	16.51 m (−0.3 m/s)		
8	Omar Craddock	United States	16.38 m (±0.0 m/s)		
9	Harold Correa	France	16.36 m (+0.7 m/s)		
10	Tosin Oke	Nigeria	16.07 m (+0.5 m/s)		
11	Nelson Évora	Portugal	15.98 m (+0.6 m/s)		

Shot put
Rank	Athlete	Nation	Distance	Points	Notes
1st place, gold medalist(s)	Tom Walsh	New Zealand	22.00 m	10	AR, MR
2nd place, silver medalist(s)	Ryan Crouser	United States	21.99 m	6	
3rd place, bronze medalist(s)	Kurt Roberts	United States	20.78 m	4	
4	Ryan Whiting	United States	20.65 m	2	
5	Konrad Bukowiecki	Poland	20.36 m	1	
6	Darrell Hill	United States	20.30 m		
7	Franck Elemba	Republic of the Congo	20.27 m		
8	Joe Kovacs	United States	20.18 m		
9	Michał Haratyk	Poland	19.60 m		
10	Darlan Romani	Brazil	19.47 m		
11	Frédéric Dagée	France	17.70 m		

Javelin throw
Rank	Athlete	Nation	Distance	Points	Notes
1st place, gold medalist(s)	Jakub Vadlejch	Czech Republic	88.02 m	10	PB
2nd place, silver medalist(s)	Julian Weber	Germany	87.39 m	6	
3rd place, bronze medalist(s)	Thomas Röhler	Germany	84.16 m	4	
4	Dmytro Kosynskyy	Ukraine	84.08 m	2	PB
5	Keshorn Walcott	Trinidad and Tobago	82.40 m	1	
6	Vítězslav Veselý	Czech Republic	78.38 m		
7	Cyrus Hostetler	United States	75.40 m		
8	Johannes Vetter	Germany	74.34 m		
9	Marcin Krukowski	Poland	74.09 m		
10	Kevin Mayer	France	60.11 m		

=== Women's ===
200 Metres
Rank	Athlete	Nation	Time	Points	Notes
1st place, gold medalist(s)	Dafne Schippers	Netherlands	22.13	10	
2nd place, silver medalist(s)	Desirèe Henry	Great Britain	22.46	6	PB
3rd place, bronze medalist(s)	Jenna Prandini	United States	22.48	4	
4	Simone Facey	Jamaica	22.70	2	
5	Ella Nelson	Australia	22.82	1	
6	Nataliya Pohrebnyak	Ukraine	22.95		
7	Brigitte Ntiamoah	France	23.69		
—	Marie Josée Ta Lou-Smith	Ivory Coast	DNF		
			Wind: (+0.1 m/s)		

400 Metres
Rank	Athlete	Nation	Time	Points	Notes
1st place, gold medalist(s)	Natasha Hastings	United States	50.06	10	
2nd place, silver medalist(s)	Stephenie Ann McPherson	Jamaica	50.33	6	
3rd place, bronze medalist(s)	Christine Day	Jamaica	50.75	4	
4	Kemi Adekoya	Bahrain	51.05	2	
5	Floria Gueï	France	51.16	1	
~~6~~	~~Olha Zemlyak~~	~~Ukraine~~	~~51.34~~		DQ (Note: Due to doping violations Zemlyak's results during this competition were disqualified.)
7	Anyika Onuora	Great Britain	51.70		
8	Marie Gayot	France	53.33		

1500 Metres
Rank	Athlete	Nation	Time	Points	Notes
1st place, gold medalist(s)	Laura Muir	Great Britain	3:55.22	10	NR, MR, WL
2nd place, silver medalist(s)	Faith Kipyegon	Kenya	3:56.72	6	
3rd place, bronze medalist(s)	Sifan Hassan	Netherlands	3:57.13	4	SB
4	Shannon Rowbury	United States	3:58.00	2	SB
5	Dawit Seyaum	Ethiopia	3:58.09	1	PB
6	Jenny Simpson	United States	3:58.19		SB
7	Besu Sado	Ethiopia	3:59.96		PB
8	Sofia Ennaoui	Poland	4:01.00		PB
9	Ciara Mageean	Ireland	4:01.46		PB
10	Winny Chebet	Kenya	4:02.66		PB
11	Zoe Buckman	Australia	4:03.22		PB
12	Meraf Bahta	Sweden	4:03.24		
13	Gudaf Tsegay	Ethiopia	4:05.54		
—	Axumawit Embaye	Ethiopia	DNF		
—	Tamara Tverdostup	Ukraine	DNF		PM
—	Judy Kiyeng	Kenya	DNF		PM

100 Metres hurdles
Rank	Athlete	Nation	Time	Points	Notes
1st place, gold medalist(s)	Kendra Harrison	United States	12.44	10	
2nd place, silver medalist(s)	Dawn Harper-Nelson	United States	12.65	6	SB
3rd place, bronze medalist(s)	Cindy Sember	Great Britain	12.66	4	
4	Jasmin Stowers	United States	12.76	2	
5	Cindy Roleder	Germany	12.78	1	
6	Cindy Billaud	France	13.02		
7	Nadine Hildebrand	Germany	13.04		
8	Sandra Gomis	France	13.18		
			Wind: (+0.2 m/s)		

3000 Metres steeplechase
Rank	Athlete	Nation	Time	Points	Notes
1st place, gold medalist(s)	Ruth Jebet	Bahrain	8:52.78	10	WR
2nd place, silver medalist(s)	Hyvin Jepkemoi	Kenya	9:01.96	6	
3rd place, bronze medalist(s)	Emma Coburn	United States	9:10.19	4	
4	Beatrice Chepkoech	Kenya	9:10.86	2	PB
5	Sofia Assefa	Ethiopia	9:13.09	1	SB
6	Genevieve Gregson	Australia	9:14.28		AR
7	Virginia Nyambura Nganga	Kenya	9:18.95		SB
8	Stephanie Garcia	United States	9:19.48		PB
9	Colleen Quigley	United States	9:20.00		PB
10	Etenesh Diro	Ethiopia	9:21.49		
11	Purity Cherotich Kirui	Kenya	9:30.62		
12	Madeline Heiner	Australia	9:36.23		
—	Ophélie Claude-Boxberger	France	DNF		
—	Aisha Praught-Leer	Jamaica	DNF		PM
—	Caroline Chepkurui	Kenya	DNF		PM

High jump
Rank	Athlete	Nation	Height	Points	Notes
1st place, gold medalist(s)	Ruth Beitia	Spain	1.98 m	10	=SB
2nd place, silver medalist(s)	Levern Spencer	Saint Lucia	1.96 m	6	SB
3rd place, bronze medalist(s)	Alessia Trost	Italy	1.93 m	4	
4	Svetlana Radzivil	Uzbekistan	1.93 m	2	
5	Inika McPherson	United States	1.93 m	1	
6	Mirela Demireva	Bulgaria	1.90 m		
6	Airinė Palšytė	Lithuania	1.90 m		
8	Michaela Hrubá	Czech Republic	1.85 m		
8	Iryna Herashchenko	Ukraine	1.85 m		
10	Marine Vallet	France	1.75 m		

Long jump
Rank	Athlete	Nation	Distance	Points	Notes
1st place, gold medalist(s)	Ivana Španović	Serbia	6.90 m (±0.0 m/s)	10	
2nd place, silver medalist(s)	Lorraine Ugen	Great Britain	6.80 m (±0.0 m/s)	6	SB
3rd place, bronze medalist(s)	Ksenija Balta	Estonia	6.75 m (±0.0 m/s)	4	
4	Shara Proctor	Great Britain	6.55 m (±0.0 m/s)	2	
5	Darya Klishina	Authorised Neutral Athletes	6.51 m (+0.1 m/s)	1	
6	Éloyse Lesueur-Aymonin	France	6.38 m (+0.2 m/s)		
7	Tianna Bartoletta	United States	6.28 m (+0.2 m/s)		
8	Blessing Okagbare	Nigeria	6.26 m (+0.1 m/s)		

Discus throw
Rank	Athlete	Nation	Distance	Points	Notes
1st place, gold medalist(s)	Sandra Elkasević	Croatia	67.62 m	10	
2nd place, silver medalist(s)	Mélina Robert-Michon	France	64.36 m	6	
3rd place, bronze medalist(s)	Denia Caballero	Cuba	61.98 m	4	
4	Jade Lally	Great Britain	61.45 m	2	
5	Nadine Müller	Germany	60.07 m	1	
6	Shanice Craft	Germany	59.32 m		
7	Zinaida Sendriūtė	Lithuania	59.23 m		
8	Pauline Pousse	France	56.65 m		
9	Whitney Ashley	United States	55.50 m		

== See also ==
- 2016 Diamond League
