= 2017 Meeting de Paris =

- Dates: 1 July 2017
- Host city: Paris, France
- Venue: Stade Sébastien Charléty
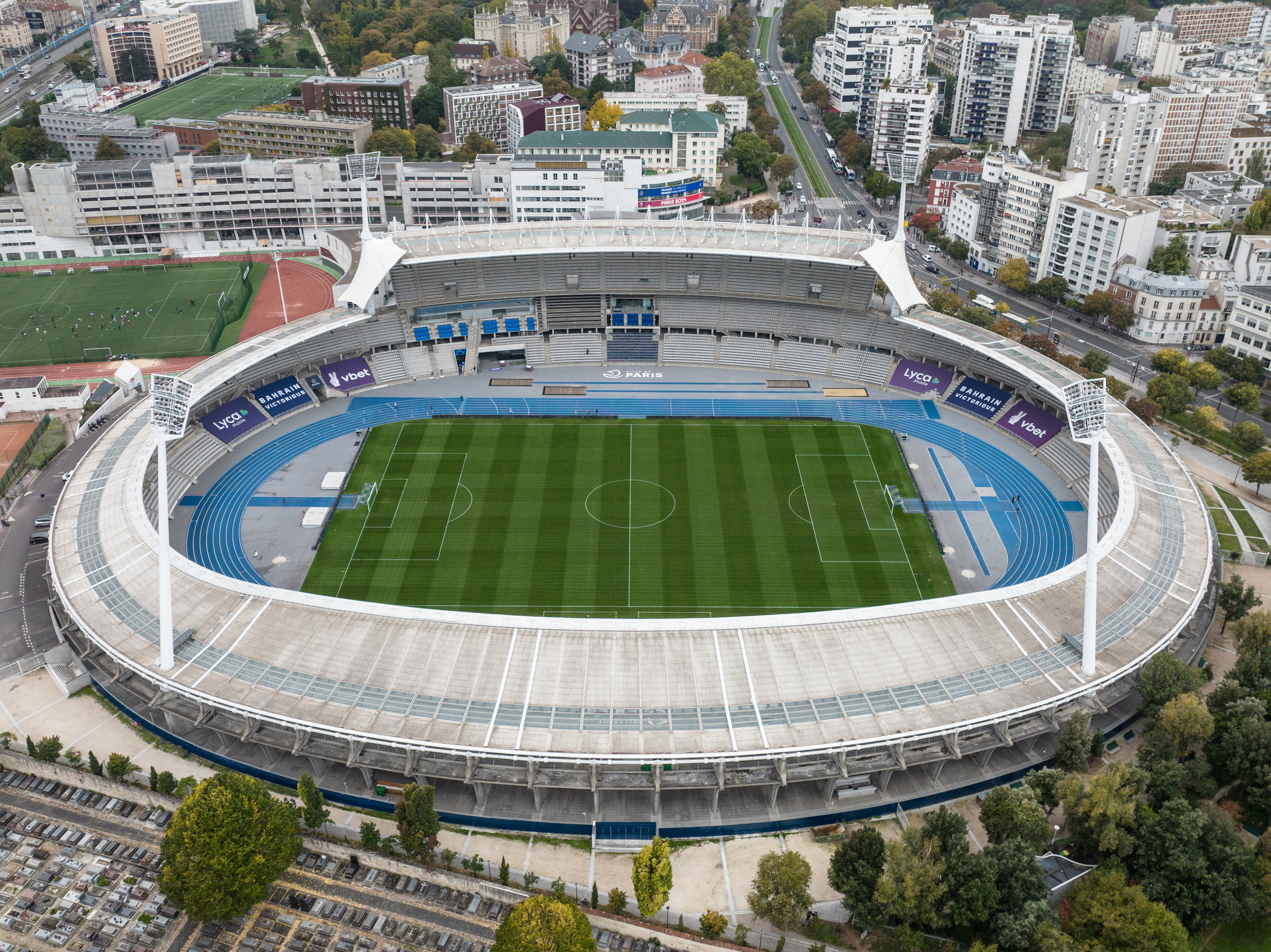
- Level: 2017 Diamond League

The 2017 Meeting de Paris was the 33rd edition of the annual outdoor track and field meeting in Paris, France. Held on 1 July at Stade Sébastien Charléty, it was the seventh leg of the 2017 Diamond League – the highest level international track and field circuit.

== Diamond events results ==
In 2017 a completely new system was introduced; the top eight athletes at each meeting were awarded points (8–7–6–5–4–3–2–1), but these points only determined which athletes qualified for the discipline finals in Zürich and Brussels. Athletes no longer became Diamond League champion due to being top of the leaderboard after the final but through winning the disciplines final event during the Diamond League Finals.

=== Men's ===
200 Metres
Rank	Athlete	Nation	Time	Points	Notes
1st place, gold medalist(s)	Ramil Guliyev	Turkey	20.15	8	
2nd place, silver medalist(s)	Churandy Martina	Netherlands	20.27	7	SB
3rd place, bronze medalist(s)	Rasheed Dwyer	Jamaica	20.45	6	
4	Ameer Webb	United States	20.48	5	
5	Lykourgos-Stefanos Tsakonas	Greece	20.51	4	
6	Dedric Dukes	United States	20.55	3	
7	Jeffrey John	France	20.72	2	
8	Ben Bassaw	France	20.94	1	
			Wind: (−0.5 m/s)		

800 Metres
Rank	Athlete	Nation	Time	Points	Notes
1st place, gold medalist(s)	Nijel Amos	Botswana	1:44.24	8	SB
2nd place, silver medalist(s)	Kipyegon Bett	Kenya	1:44.36	7	
3rd place, bronze medalist(s)	Ferguson Rotich	Kenya	1:44.37	6	SB
4	Robert Biwott	Kenya	1:45.05	5	SB
5	Amel Tuka	Bosnia and Herzegovina	1:45.40	4	
6	Job Koech Kinyor	Kenya	1:45.50	3	
7	Pierre-Ambroise Bosse	France	1:45.71	2	SB
8	Thijmen Kupers	Netherlands	1:46.07	1	
9	Samir Dahmani	France	1:46.76		
10	Alfred Kipketer	Kenya	1:47.36		
11	Willy Tarbei	Kenya	1:51.77		
—	Nicholas Kipkoech	Kenya	DNF		PM

3000 Metres
Rank	Athlete	Nation	Time	Points	Notes
1st place, gold medalist(s)	Muktar Edris	Ethiopia	7:32.31	8	PB
2nd place, silver medalist(s)	Ronald Kwemoi	Kenya	7:32.88	7	
3rd place, bronze medalist(s)	Yomif Kejelcha	Ethiopia	7:33.37	6	
4	Joshua Cheptegei	Uganda	7:34.96	5	
5	Adel Mechaal	Spain	7:35.28	4	PB
6	Ben True	United States	7:35.53	3	PB
7	Patrick Tiernan	Australia	7:39.28	2	PB
8	Yenew Alamirew	Ethiopia	7:39.57	1	
9	Bethwell Birgen	Kenya	7:43.57		
10	Abdalaati Iguider	Morocco	7:43.96		
11	Jonathan Ndiku	Kenya	7:44.33		
12	Albert Rop	Bahrain	7:44.69		
13	Yemaneberhan Crippa	Italy	7:55.31		PB
14	Cyrus Rutto	Kenya	8:04.56		
15	Hayle Ibrahimov	Azerbaijan	8:10.52		
—	Cornelius Kiplangat	Kenya	DNF		PM
—	Collins Cheboi	Kenya	DNF		PM

110 metres hurdles - Heats
Rank	Athlete	Nation	Time	Notes
Heat 1
1	Sergey Shubenkov	Authorised Neutral Athletes	13.09	Q, SB
2	Devon Allen	United States	13.10	Q, SB
3	Garfield Darien	France	13.15	Q
4	Antonio Alkana	South Africa	13.21	q
5	Milan Trajkovic	Cyprus	13.27	q, NR
6	Balázs Baji	Hungary	13.28	
7	Benjamin Sedecias	France	13.41	PB
8	Wilhem Belocian	France	14.35	
			Wind: (±0.0 m/s)	
Heat 2
1	Omar McLeod	Jamaica	13.13	Q
2	Andrew Pozzi	Great Britain	13.24	Q
3	Ronald Levy	Jamaica	13.28	Q
4	Hansle Parchment	Jamaica	13.41	
5	Shane Brathwaite	Barbados	13.54	
6	Aurel Manga	France	13.55	
7	Ludovic Payen	France	13.76	
8	Nicolas Borome	France	14.01	
			Wind: (+0.1 m/s)	

110 Metres hurdles
Rank	Athlete	Nation	Time	Points	Notes
1st place, gold medalist(s)	Ronald Levy	Jamaica	13.05	8	PB
2nd place, silver medalist(s)	Andrew Pozzi	Great Britain	13.14	7	PB
3rd place, bronze medalist(s)	Garfield Darien	France	13.15	6	
4	Sergey Shubenkov	Authorised Neutral Athletes	13.18	5	
5	Antonio Alkana	South Africa	13.24	4	
6	Milan Trajkovic	Cyprus	13.30	3	
7	Omar McLeod	Jamaica	13.41	2	
—	Devon Allen	United States	DQ		R 162.7
			Wind: (−0.1 m/s)		

High jump
Rank	Athlete	Nation	Height	Points	Notes
1st place, gold medalist(s)	Mutaz Barsham	Qatar	2.35 m	8	
2nd place, silver medalist(s)	Bohdan Bondarenko	Ukraine	2.32 m	7	SB
3rd place, bronze medalist(s)	Majd Eddin Ghazal	Syria	2.32 m	6	SB
4	Tihomir Ivanov	Bulgaria	2.28 m	5	
5	Andriy Protsenko	Ukraine	2.28 m	4	SB
6	Michael Mason	Canada	2.24 m	3	
6	Robbie Grabarz	Great Britain	2.24 m	3	
8	Sylwester Bednarek	Poland	2.20 m	1	
8	Takashi Eto	Japan	2.20 m	1	
10	Donald Thomas	Bahamas	2.20 m		
11	Mickaël Hanany	France	2.20 m		
—	Naoto Tobe	Japan	NM		
—	Gianmarco Tamberi	Italy	NM		

Pole vault
Rank	Athlete	Nation	Height	Points	Notes
1st place, gold medalist(s)	Sam Kendricks	United States	5.82 m	8	
2nd place, silver medalist(s)	Renaud Lavillenie	France	5.62 m	7	
3rd place, bronze medalist(s)	Shawn Barber	Canada	5.62 m	6	
4	Paweł Wojciechowski	Poland	5.62 m	5	
5	Kévin Menaldo	France	5.52 m	4	
6	Axel Chapelle	France	5.52 m	3	
7	Raphael Holzdeppe	Germany	5.52 m	2	
8	Jan Kudlička	Czech Republic	5.52 m	1	
9	Valentin Lavillenie	France	5.37 m		
10	Emmanouil Karalis	Greece	5.37 m		
—	Michal Balner	Czech Republic	NM		

Triple jump
Rank	Athlete	Nation	Distance	Points	Notes
1st place, gold medalist(s)	Christian Taylor	United States	17.29 m (±0.0 m/s)	8	
2nd place, silver medalist(s)	Will Claye	United States	17.18 m (−0.3 m/s)	7	
3rd place, bronze medalist(s)	Max Heß	Germany	17.07 m (−0.6 m/s)	6	SB
4	Pedro Pichardo	Cuba	17.05 m (−1.0 m/s)	5	SB
5	Alexis Copello	Azerbaijan	16.96 m (−0.2 m/s)	4	
6	Nelson Évora	Portugal	16.91 m (+0.4 m/s)	3	SB
7	Jean-Marc Pontvianne	France	16.82 m (−0.4 m/s)	2	
8	Hugues Fabrice Zango	Burkina Faso	16.60 m (+0.1 m/s)	1	
9	Jhon Murillo	Colombia	16.43 m (−0.2 m/s)		
10	Benjamin Compaoré	France	16.16 m (−0.4 m/s)		

Javelin throw
Rank	Athlete	Nation	Distance	Points	Notes
1st place, gold medalist(s)	Johannes Vetter	Germany	88.74 m	8	
2nd place, silver medalist(s)	Jakub Vadlejch	Czech Republic	88.02 m	7	
3rd place, bronze medalist(s)	Thomas Röhler	Germany	87.23 m	6	
4	Tero Pitkämäki	Finland	85.34 m	5	
5	Neeraj Chopra	India	84.67 m	4	
6	Magnus Kirt	Estonia	83.88 m	3	
7	Hamish Peacock	Australia	83.87 m	2	
8	Andrian Mardare	Moldova	77.93 m	1	
9	Vítězslav Veselý	Czech Republic	76.00 m		
10	Jérémy Nicollin	France	64.19 m		

=== Women's ===
100 Metres
Rank	Athlete	Nation	Time	Points	Notes
1st place, gold medalist(s)	Elaine Thompson-Herah	Jamaica	10.91	8	
2nd place, silver medalist(s)	Marie Josée Ta Lou-Smith	Ivory Coast	10.96	7	SB
3rd place, bronze medalist(s)	Blessing Okagbare	Nigeria	11.09	6	SB
4	Murielle Ahouré-Demps	Ivory Coast	11.10	5	
5	Carolle Zahi	France	11.17	4	PB
6	Christania Williams	Jamaica	11.22	3	
7	Morolake Akinosun	United States	11.27	2	
8	Floriane Gnafoua	France	11.37	1	
			Wind: (+0.1 m/s)		

400 Metres
Rank	Athlete	Nation	Time	Points	Notes
1st place, gold medalist(s)	Novlene Williams-Mills	Jamaica	51.03	8	
2nd place, silver medalist(s)	Courtney Okolo	United States	51.19	7	
3rd place, bronze medalist(s)	Shericka Jackson	Jamaica	51.91	6	
4	Lydia Jele	Botswana	51.96	5	
5	Floria Gueï	France	52.33	4	
~~6~~	~~Olha Zemlyak~~	~~Ukraine~~	~~52.93~~	~~3~~	DQ (Note: Due to doping violations Zemlyak's results during this competition were disqualified.)
7	Déborah Sananes	France	53.41	2	

1500 Metres
Rank	Athlete	Nation	Time	Points	Notes
1st place, gold medalist(s)	Sifan Hassan	Netherlands	3:57.10	8	
2nd place, silver medalist(s)	Faith Kipyegon	Kenya	3:57.51	7	SB
3rd place, bronze medalist(s)	Gudaf Tsegay	Ethiopia	3:59.55	6	PB
4	Angelika Cichocka	Poland	4:01.61	5	PB
5	Rababe Arafi	Morocco	4:01.81	4	
6	Winny Chebet	Kenya	4:03.55	3	
7	Nelly Jepkosgei	Bahrain	4:04.64	2	
8	Judy Kiyeng	Kenya	4:05.54	1	
9	Besu Sado	Ethiopia	4:05.70		
10	Malika Akkaoui	Morocco	4:06.37		
11	Maureen Koster	Netherlands	4:06.70		
12	Claudia Bobocea	Romania	4:07.67		
13	Linden Hall	Australia	4:08.55		
14	Axumawit Embaye	Ethiopia	4:14.13		
—	Halimah Nakaayi	Uganda	DNF		PM

3000 Metres Steeplechase
Rank	Athlete	Nation	Time	Points	Notes
1st place, gold medalist(s)	Beatrice Chepkoech	Kenya	9:01.69	8	
2nd place, silver medalist(s)	Hyvin Jepkemoi	Kenya	9:06.00	7	
3rd place, bronze medalist(s)	Celliphine Chespol	Kenya	9:07.54	6	
4	Ruth Jebet	Bahrain	9:10.95	5	
5	Emma Coburn	United States	9:11.08	4	
6	Etenesh Diro	Ethiopia	9:13.25	3	PB
7	Aisha Praught-Leer	Jamaica	9:20.38	2	
8	Fabienne Schlumpf	Switzerland	9:22.01	1	
9	Sofia Assefa	Ethiopia	9:24.39		
10	Habiba Ghribi	Tunisia	9:27.02		SB
11	Norah Jeruto	Kenya	9:27.58		
12	Purity Cherotich Kirui	Kenya	9:33.71		
13	Luiza Gega	Albania	9:36.11		
14	María José Pérez	Spain	9:40.51		PB
15	Maeva Danois	France	9:48.42		
—	Ophélie Claude-Boxberger	France	DNF		
—	Caroline Tuigong	Kenya	DNF		PM

Shot Put
Rank	Athlete	Nation	Distance	Points	Notes
1st place, gold medalist(s)	Gong Lijiao	China	19.14 m	8	
2nd place, silver medalist(s)	Anita Márton	Hungary	18.48 m	7	
3rd place, bronze medalist(s)	Yuliya Leantsiuk	Belarus	18.28 m	6	SB
4	Aliona Dubitskaya	Belarus	18.23 m	5	
5	Paulina Guba	Poland	17.78 m	4	
6	Fanny Roos	Sweden	17.68 m	3	
7	Geisa Arcanjo	Brazil	17.36 m	2	
8	Melissa Boekelman	Netherlands	17.22 m	1	

== Promotional events results ==
=== Men's ===
100 Metres
Rank	Athlete	Nation	Time	Notes
1st place, gold medalist(s)	Ben Youssef Meïté	Ivory Coast	9.99	SB
2nd place, silver medalist(s)	Yunier Pérez	Cuba	10.05	PB
3rd place, bronze medalist(s)	Churandy Martina	Netherlands	10.23 [.221]	
4	Henricho Bruintjies	South Africa	10.23 [.222]	
5	Julian Forte	Jamaica	10.26	
6	Méba-Mickaël Zeze	France	10.36	SB
—	Emmanuel Matadi	Liberia	DQ	R 162.7
—	Kim Collins	Saint Kitts and Nevis	DQ	R 162.7
			Wind: (−0.1 m/s)	

== See also ==
- 2017 Diamond League
