= 2015 Meeting Areva =

- Dates: 4 July 2015
- Host city: Saint-Denis, France
- Venue: Stade de France
- Level: 2015 Diamond League

The 2015 Meeting Areva was the 31st edition of the annual outdoor track and field meeting in Saint-Denis, France. Held on 4 July at Stade de France, it was the eighth leg of the 2015 Diamond League – the highest level international track and field circuit.

== Diamond events results ==
Podium finishers earned points towards a season leaderboard (4-2-1 respectively), points per event were then doubled in the Diamond League Finals. Athletes had to take part in the Diamond race during the finals to be eligible to win the Diamond trophy which is awarded to the athlete with the most points at the end of the season.

=== Men's ===
100 Metres
Rank	Athlete	Nation	Time	Points	Notes
1st place, gold medalist(s)	Asafa Powell	Jamaica	9.81	4	SB
2nd place, silver medalist(s)	Jimmy Vicaut	France	9.86	2	=AR
3rd place, bronze medalist(s)	Mike Rodgers	United States	9.99	1	
4	Nesta Carter	Jamaica	10.02		
5	Kim Collins	Saint Kitts and Nevis	10.05		
6	Clayton Vaughn	United States	10.08		
7	Churandy Martina	Netherlands	10.12		SB
8	Emmanuel Biron	France	10.18		PB
9	Guy-Elphège Anouman	France	10.32		PB
			Wind: (+1.3 m/s)		

400 Metres
Rank	Athlete	Nation	Time	Points	Notes
1st place, gold medalist(s)	Wayde van Niekerk	South Africa	43.96	4	AR
2nd place, silver medalist(s)	Kirani James	Grenada	44.17	2	
3rd place, bronze medalist(s)	David Verburg	United States	44.81	1	
4	Rusheen McDonald	Jamaica	44.84		
5	Jonathan Borlée	Belgium	44.93		
6	Michael Berry	United States	45.49		
7	Pavel Maslák	Czech Republic	45.51		
8	Edino Steele	Jamaica	46.22		

1500 Metres
Rank	Athlete	Nation	Time	Points	Notes
1st place, gold medalist(s)	Silas Kiplagat	Kenya	3:30.12	4	WL
2nd place, silver medalist(s)	Ayanleh Souleiman	Djibouti	3:30.17	2	
3rd place, bronze medalist(s)	Ronald Kwemoi	Kenya	3:30.43	1	SB
4	Taoufik Makhloufi	Algeria	3:30.50		
5	Robert Biwott	Kenya	3:31.39		PB
6	Abdalaati Iguider	Morocco	3:31.51		SB
7	James Kiplagat Magut	Kenya	3:31.76		SB
8	Collins Cheboi	Kenya	3:31.88		SB
9	Aman Wote	Ethiopia	3:32.03		
10	İlham Tanui Özbilen	Turkey	3:32.68		SB
11	Henrik Ingebrigtsen	Norway	3:32.85		
12	Benson Seurei	Bahrain	3:35.14		SB
13	Morhad Amdouni	France	3:35.17		PB
14	Samir Dahmani	France	3:37.05		PB
—	Bram Som	Netherlands	DNF		PM
—	Nicholas Kipkoech	Kenya	DNF		PM

110 Metres hurdles
Rank	Athlete	Nation	Time	Points	Notes
1st place, gold medalist(s)	Orlando Ortega	Cuba	12.94	4	WL
2nd place, silver medalist(s)	David Oliver	United States	12.98	2	SB
3rd place, bronze medalist(s)	Sergey Shubenkov	Russia	13.06	1	NR
4	Aleec Harris	United States	13.11		PB
5	Pascal Martinot-Lagarde	France	13.18		
6	Garfield Darien	France	13.19		SB
7	Dimitri Bascou	France	13.31		
8	Aries Merritt	United States	13.44		
			Wind: (+1.3 m/s)		

3000 Metres steeplechase
Rank	Athlete	Nation	Time	Points	Notes
1st place, gold medalist(s)	Jairus Birech	Kenya	7:58.83	4	MR, WL
2nd place, silver medalist(s)	Evan Jager	United States	8:00.45	2	AR
3rd place, bronze medalist(s)	Conseslus Kipruto	Kenya	8:09.90	1	SB
4	Brimin Kipruto	Kenya	8:10.09		PB
5	Clement Kemboi	Kenya	8:12.68		
6	Paul Kipsiele Koech	Kenya	8:14.65		
7	Daniel Huling	United States	8:15.21		
8	Hillary Yego	Kenya	8:16.55		
9	Donn Cabral	United States	8:17.20		
10	Ilgizar Safiullin	Russia	8:18.49		PB
11	Ezekiel Kemboi	Kenya	8:19.49		
12	Yoann Kowal	France	8:22.17		
13	Sebastián Martos	Spain	8:22.38		SB
14	Roberto Aláiz	Spain	8:29.69		
15	Mateusz Demczyszak	Poland	8:31.82		SB
—	Haron Lagat	Kenya	DNF		PM
—	Lawrence Kemboi	Kenya	DNF		PM

High jump
Rank	Athlete	Nation	Height	Points	Notes
1st place, gold medalist(s)	Daniil Tsyplakov	Russia	2.32 m	4	
2nd place, silver medalist(s)	Donald Thomas	Bahamas	2.32 m	2	
3rd place, bronze medalist(s)	Adonios Mastoras	Greece	2.29 m	1	SB
4	Erik Kynard	United States	2.29 m		
5	Mutaz Barsham	Qatar	2.29 m		
~~5~~	~~Aleksandr Shustov~~	~~Russia~~	~~2.29 m~~		DQ (Note: Due to doping violations Shustov's results during this competition were disqualified.)
6	Jaroslav Bába	Czech Republic	2.29 m		
7	Marco Fassinotti	Italy	2.24 m		
8	Naoto Tobe	Japan	2.24 m		
8	Ivan Ukhov	Russia	2.24 m		
10	Mickaël Hanany	France	2.19 m		

Pole vault
Rank	Athlete	Nation	Height	Points	Notes
1st place, gold medalist(s)	Konstantinos Filippidis	Greece	5.91 m	4	NR
2nd place, silver medalist(s)	Thiago Braz	Brazil	5.86 m	2	
3rd place, bronze medalist(s)	Sam Kendricks	United States	5.81 m	1	
4	Kévin Menaldo	France	5.81 m		PB
5	Aleksandr Gripich	Russia	5.71 m		=SB
5	Renaud Lavillenie	France	5.71 m		
7	Jan Kudlička	Czech Republic	5.71 m		
8	Piotr Lisek	Poland	5.56 m		
8	Paweł Wojciechowski	Poland	5.56 m		
10	Valentin Lavillenie	France	5.56 m		
11	Carlo Paech	Germany	5.56 m		
—	Raphael Holzdeppe	Germany	NM		

Long jump
Rank	Athlete	Nation	Distance	Points	Notes
1st place, gold medalist(s)	Michael Hartfield	United States	8.19 m (−0.9 m/s)	4	
2nd place, silver medalist(s)	Kafétien Gomis	France	8.13 m (+1.2 m/s)	2	
3rd place, bronze medalist(s)	Fabrice Lapierre	Australia	8.07 m (−1.2 m/s)	1	
4	Eusebio Cáceres	Spain	8.06 m (+0.3 m/s)		SB
5	Aleksandr Menkov	Russia	7.99 m (+0.5 m/s)		
6	Damar Forbes	Jamaica	7.89 m (−0.4 m/s)		
7	Tyrone Smith	Bermuda	7.86 m (−0.1 m/s)		
8	Salim Sdiri	France	7.64 m (+0.2 m/s)		
9	Raihau Maiau	French Polynesia	7.49 m (−0.1 m/s)		

Discus throw
Rank	Athlete	Nation	Distance	Points	Notes
1st place, gold medalist(s)	Piotr Małachowski	Poland	65.57 m	4	
2nd place, silver medalist(s)	Zoltán Kővágó	Hungary	65.23 m	2	
3rd place, bronze medalist(s)	Gerd Kanter	Estonia	64.11 m	1	SB
4	Christoph Harting	Germany	63.90 m		
5	Robert Urbanek	Poland	63.48 m		
6	Vikas Gowda	India	63.17 m		
7	Jason Morgan	Jamaica	62.03 m		
8	Philip Milanov	Belgium	61.31 m		
9	Jared Schuurmans	United States	60.61 m		
10	Lolassonn Djouhan	France	60.26 m		

=== Women's ===
100 Metres
Rank	Athlete	Nation	Time	Points	Notes
1st place, gold medalist(s)	Shelly-Ann Fraser-Pryce	Jamaica	10.74	4	MR, WL
2nd place, silver medalist(s)	Blessing Okagbare	Nigeria	10.80	2	SB
3rd place, bronze medalist(s)	English Gardner	United States	10.97	1	
4	Dafne Schippers	Netherlands	11.02		
5	Murielle Ahouré-Demps	Ivory Coast	11.04		
6	Marie Josée Ta Lou-Smith	Ivory Coast	11.06		PB
7	Natasha Morrison	Jamaica	11.10		
8	Dezerea Bryant	United States	11.19		
9	Véronique Mang	France	11.29		SB
			Wind: (+0.2 m/s)		

800 Metres
Rank	Athlete	Nation	Time	Points	Notes
1st place, gold medalist(s)	Eunice Sum	Kenya	1:56.99	4	WL
2nd place, silver medalist(s)	Rose Mary Almanza	Cuba	1:57.70	2	PB
3rd place, bronze medalist(s)	Selina Rutz-Büchel	Switzerland	1:57.95	1	NR
4	Molly Ludlow	United States	1:58.68		PB
5	Chanelle Price	United States	1:59.10		PB
~~6~~	~~Ekaterina Poistogova~~	~~Russia~~	~~2:00.03~~		DQ (Note: Due to doping violations Poistogova's results during this competition were disqualified.)
7	Joanna Jóźwik	Poland	2:00.09		SB
8	Nataliia Lupu	Ukraine	2:00.54		
9	Maryna Arzamasova	Belarus	2:00.94		
10	Claudia Saunders	France	2:02.55		
—	Ilona Usovich	Belarus	DNF		PM

5000 Metres
Rank	Athlete	Nation	Time	Points	Notes
1st place, gold medalist(s)	Genzebe Dibaba	Ethiopia	14:15.41	4	MR
2nd place, silver medalist(s)	Almaz Ayana	Ethiopia	14:21.97	2	
3rd place, bronze medalist(s)	Mercy Cherono	Kenya	14:34.10	1	PB
4	Viola Kibiwot	Kenya	14:34.22		SB
5	Senbere Teferi	Ethiopia	14:36.44		PB
6	Gelete Burka	Ethiopia	14:40.50		SB
7	Faith Kipyegon	Kenya	14:44.51		
8	Alemitu Heroye	Ethiopia	14:44.95		
9	Belaynesh Oljira	Ethiopia	15:05.19		
10	Betsy Saina	Kenya	15:07.90		
11	Karoline Bjerkeli Grøvdal	Norway	15:15.49		
12	Azemra Gebru	Ethiopia	15:15.77		
13	Netsanet Gudeta	Ethiopia	15:31.25		
14	Alia Saeed Mohammed	United Arab Emirates	15:43.15		
—	Sara Moreira	Portugal	DNF		
—	Renata Pliś	Poland	DNF		
—	Irene Jelagat	Kenya	DNF		PM
—	Tamara Tverdostup	Ukraine	DNF		PM

400 Metres hurdles
Rank	Athlete	Nation	Time	Points	Notes
1st place, gold medalist(s)	Zuzana Hejnová	Czech Republic	53.76	4	SB
2nd place, silver medalist(s)	Sara Petersen	Denmark	53.99	2	NR
3rd place, bronze medalist(s)	Kemi Adekoya	Bahrain	54.12	1	NR
4	Cassandra Tate	United States	54.52		
5	Wenda Nel	South Africa	54.61		
6	Georganne Moline	United States	55.37		
7	Janieve Russell	Jamaica	55.54		
8	Aurélie Chaboudez	France	56.03		

Pole vault
Rank	Athlete	Nation	Height	Points	Notes
1st place, gold medalist(s)	Nikoleta Kyriakopoulou	Greece	4.83 m	4	=DLR, NR, WL
2nd place, silver medalist(s)	Yarisley Silva	Cuba	4.73 m	2	SB
3rd place, bronze medalist(s)	Fabiana Murer	Brazil	4.63 m	1	
3rd place, bronze medalist(s)	Anzhelika Sidorova	Russia	4.63 m	1	
5	Silke Spiegelburg	Germany	4.63 m		
6	Sandi Morris	United States	4.53 m		
7	Marion Lotout	France	4.53 m		
8	Nicole Büchler	Switzerland	4.53 m		
9	Jiřina Kudličková	Czech Republic	4.38 m		
9	Angelica Bengtsson	Sweden	4.38 m		
11	Katerina Stefanidi	Greece	4.38 m		

Triple jump
Rank	Athlete	Nation	Distance	Points	Notes
1st place, gold medalist(s)	Caterine Ibargüen	Colombia	14.87 m (+0.3 m/s)	4	
2nd place, silver medalist(s)	Ekaterina Koneva	Russia	14.72 m (−0.5 m/s)	2	
3rd place, bronze medalist(s)	Hanna Knyazyeva-Minenko	Israel	14.56 m (+1.3 m/s)	1	
4	Olga Rypakova	Kazakhstan	14.44 m (+0.2 m/s)		
5	Gabriela Petrova	Bulgaria	14.23 m (+0.2 m/s)		
6	Kimberly Williams	Jamaica	14.20 m (+0.3 m/s)		
7	Susana Costa	Portugal	13.95 m (+0.3 m/s)		
8	Jeanine Assani Issouf	France	13.86 m (+1.0 m/s)		
9	Olha Saladukha	Ukraine	13.79 m (−1.1 m/s)		
10	Kristin Gierisch	Germany	13.74 m (+0.4 m/s)		
11	Patrícia Mamona	Portugal	13.73 m (−0.2 m/s)		

Shot put
Rank	Athlete	Nation	Distance	Points	Notes
1st place, gold medalist(s)	Christina Schwanitz	Germany	20.31 m		
2nd place, silver medalist(s)	Gong Lijiao	China	19.75 m		
3rd place, bronze medalist(s)	Michelle Carter	United States	19.37 m		
4	Cleopatra Borel	Trinidad and Tobago	19.07 m		SB
5	Valerie Adams	New Zealand	18.79 m		
6	Jeneva Stevens	United States	18.79 m		
7	Anita Márton	Hungary	18.42 m		
~~8~~	~~Irina Tarasova~~	~~Russia~~	~~17.87 m~~		DQ (Note: Due to doping violations Tarasova's results during this competition were disqualified.)
9	Brittany Smith	United States	17.81 m		
10	Natallia Mikhnevich	Belarus	17.70 m		
11	Tia Brooks	United States	17.22 m		
12	Jessica Cérival	France	16.70 m		

Javelin throw
Rank	Athlete	Nation	Distance	Points	Notes
1st place, gold medalist(s)	Barbora Špotáková	Czech Republic	64.42 m	4	SB
2nd place, silver medalist(s)	Kim Mickle	Australia	63.80 m	2	
3rd place, bronze medalist(s)	Sunette Viljoen	South Africa	63.15 m	1	
4	Marharyta Dorozhon	Israel	62.94 m		
5	Madara Sady Ndure	Latvia	62.28 m		
6	Kara Winger	United States	61.71 m		
7	Lü Huihui	China	61.01 m		
8	Linda Stahl	Germany	59.77 m		
9	Mathilde Andraud	France	59.03 m		SB
10	Christina Obergföll	Germany	58.11 m		
11	Martina Ratej	Slovenia	54.55 m		

== Promotional events results ==
=== Men's ===
110 Metres Hurdles
Rank	Athlete	Nation	Time	Notes
1st place, gold medalist(s)	Yordan O'Farrill	Cuba	13.29	
2nd place, silver medalist(s)	Shane Brathwaite	Barbados	13.31	
3rd place, bronze medalist(s)	Konstantinos Douvalidis	Greece	13.34	=NR
4	Jeff Porter	United States	13.37	
5	Gregor Traber	Germany	13.47	
6	Thomas Martinot-Lagarde	France	13.53	
7	Artur Noga	Poland	13.61	
8	Bano Traoré	Mali	13.62	SB
9	Simon Krauss	France	13.70	
			Wind: (+0.4 m/s)	

== See also ==
- 2015 Diamond League
