= 2023 Meeting de Paris =

28th edition of the annual Meeting de Paris

- Dates: 18 June 2023
- Host city: Paris, France
- Venue: Stade Sébastien Charléty
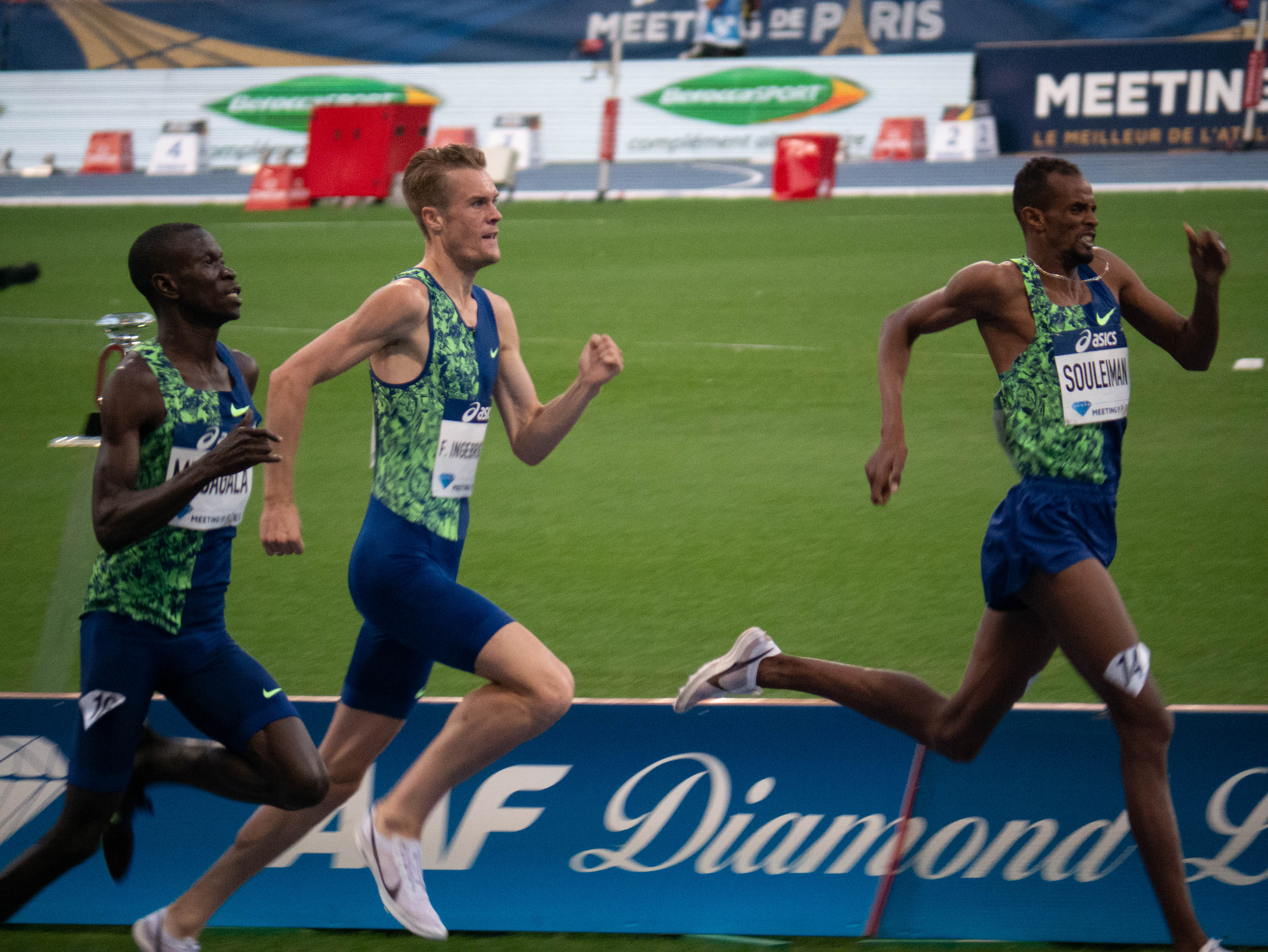
- Level: 2023 Diamond League

The 2023 Meeting de Paris was the 28th edition of the annual outdoor track and field meeting in Paris, France. Held on 9 June at the Stade Sébastien Charléty, it was the fourth leg of the 2023 Diamond League – the highest level international track and field circuit. This was the fourth time the meeting was held on the stadium's renovated blue running track.

The meeting was considered one of the greatest single-day athletics competitions in history, as world records were broken in the men's 3000 m steeplechase, women's 5000 m, and men's two miles.

== Results ==
Athletes competing in the Diamond League disciplines earned extra compensation and points which went towards qualifying for the Diamond League finals in Zürich. First place earned 8 points, with each step down in place earning one less point than the previous, until no points are awarded in 9th place or lower.

=== Diamond Discipline ===
Men's 100m (−0.9 m/s)
| Place | Athlete | Country | Time | Points |
|---|---|---|---|---|
| 1st place, gold medalist(s) | Noah Lyles | United States | 9.97 | 8 |
| 2nd place, silver medalist(s) | Ferdinand Omanyala | Kenya | 9.98 | 7 |
| 3rd place, bronze medalist(s) | Letsile Tebogo | Botswana | 10.05 | 6 |
| 4 | Yohan Blake | Jamaica | 10.16 | 5 |
| 5 | Ronnie Baker | United States | 10.17 | 4 |
| 6 | Benjamin Azamati | Ghana | 10.20 | 3 |
| 7 | Marcell Jacobs | Italy | 10.21 | 2 |
| 8 | Mouhamadou Fall | France | 10.22 | 1 |

Men's 800m
| Place | Athlete | Country | Time | Points |
|---|---|---|---|---|
| 1st place, gold medalist(s) | Emmanuel Wanyonyi | Kenya | 1:43.27 | 8 |
| 2nd place, silver medalist(s) | Marco Arop | Canada | 1:43.30 | 7 |
| 3rd place, bronze medalist(s) | Slimane Moula | Algeria | 1:43.38 | 6 |
| 4 | Djamel Sedjati | Algeria | 1:43.40 | 5 |
| 5 | Benjamin Robert | France | 1:43.48 | 4 |
| 6 | Wyclife Kinyamal | Kenya | 1:43.56 | 3 |
| 7 | Azeddine Habz | France | 1:43.90 | 2 |
| 8 | Yanis Meziane | France | 1:44.78 | 1 |
| 9 | Andreas Kramer | Sweden | 1:44.85 | |
| 10 | Emmanuel Korir | Kenya | 1:47.71 | |
| | Patryk Sieradzki | Poland | DNF | |

Men's 110mH (−0.5 m/s)
| Place | Athlete | Country | Time | Points |
|---|---|---|---|---|
| 1st place, gold medalist(s) | Grant Holloway | United States | 12.98 | 8 |
| 2nd place, silver medalist(s) | Just Kwaou-Mathey | France | 13.09 | 7 |
| 3rd place, bronze medalist(s) | Jamal Britt | United States | 13.14 | 6 |
| 4 | Daniel Roberts | United States | 13.14 | 5 |
| 5 | Wilhem Belocian | France | 13.20 | 4 |
| 6 | Freddie Crittenden | United States | 13.26 | 3 |
| 7 | Jason Joseph | Switzerland | 13.29 | 2 |
| 8 | Eric Edwards Jr. | United States | 13.32 | 1 |

Men's 110mH Round 1
| Place | Athlete | Country | Time | Heat |
|---|---|---|---|---|
| 1 | Grant Holloway | United States | 13.20 | 2 |
| 2 | Jamal Britt | United States | 13.21 | 2 |
| 3 | Just Kwaou-Mathey | France | 13.25 | 2 |
| 4 | Daniel Roberts | United States | 13.32 | 1 |
| 5 | Freddie Crittenden | United States | 13.34 | 2 |
| 6 | Jason Joseph | Switzerland | 13.36 | 1 |
| 7 | Wilhem Belocian | France | 13.37 | 1 |
| 8 | Eric Edwards Jr. | United States | 13.39 | 1 |
| 9 | Roger Iribarne | Cuba | 13.44 | 1 |
| 10 | Pascal Martinot-Lagarde | France | 13.45 | 2 |
| 11 | Antonio Alkana | South Africa | 13.52 | 2 |
| 12 | Aurel Manga | France | 13.55 | 2 |
| 13 | Rafael Pereira | Brazil | 13.57 | 2 |
| 14 | Raphaël Mohamed | France | 13.65 | 1 |
| 15 | Dimitri Bascou | France | 13.66 | 1 |
| | Devon Allen | United States | DNF | 1 |

Men's 400mH
| Place | Athlete | Country | Time | Points |
|---|---|---|---|---|
| 1st place, gold medalist(s) | CJ Allen | United States | 47.92 | 8 |
| 2nd place, silver medalist(s) | Wilfried Happio | France | 48.26 | 7 |
| 3rd place, bronze medalist(s) | Trevor Bassitt | United States | 48.28 | 6 |
| 4 | Ludvy Vaillant | France | 48.60 | 5 |
| 5 | Kyron McMaster | British Virgin Islands | 48.65 | 4 |
| 6 | Khallifah Rosser | United States | 48.96 | 3 |
| | Abderrahman Samba | Qatar | DNF | |

Men's 3000mSC
| Place | Athlete | Country | Time | Points |
|---|---|---|---|---|
| 1st place, gold medalist(s) | Lamecha Girma | Ethiopia | 7:52.11 | 8 |
| 2nd place, silver medalist(s) | Ryuji Miura | Japan | 8:09.91 | 7 |
| 3rd place, bronze medalist(s) | Daniel Arce | Spain | 8:10.63 | 6 |
| 4 | Abrham Sime | Ethiopia | 8:10.73 | 5 |
| 5 | Mohamed Amin Jhinaoui | Tunisia | 8:12.19 | 4 |
| 6 | Benjamin Kigen | Kenya | 8:13.49 | 3 |
| 7 | Víctor Ruiz | Spain | 8:13.89 | 2 |
| 8 | Abraham Kibiwot | Kenya | 8:16.13 | 1 |
| 9 | Anthony Rotich | United States | 8:16.27 | |
| 10 | Amos Serem | Kenya | 8:16.94 | |
| 11 | Fernando Carro | Spain | 8:17.06 | |
| 12 | Djilali Bedrani | France | 8:21.70 | |
| 13 | Topi Raitanen | Finland | 8:22.00 | |
| 14 | Hailemariyam Amare | Ethiopia | 8:25.25 | |
| 15 | Tegenu Mengistu | Ethiopia | 8:30.23 | |
| 16 | Osama Zoghlami | Italy | 8:31.88 | |
| | El Mehdi Aboujanah | Spain | DNF | |
| | Lawrence Kemboi | Kenya | DNF | |

Men's Long Jump
| Place | Athlete | Country | Mark | Points |
|---|---|---|---|---|
| 1st place, gold medalist(s) | Miltiadis Tentoglou | Greece | 8.13 m (+0.1 m/s) | 8 |
| 2nd place, silver medalist(s) | Simon Ehammer | Switzerland | 8.11 m (−0.1 m/s) | 7 |
| 3rd place, bronze medalist(s) | Murali Sreeshankar | India | 8.09 m (±0.0 m/s) | 6 |
| 4 | Jules Pommery | France | 7.90 m (−0.1 m/s) | 5 |
| 5 | William Williams | United States | 7.87 m (−0.9 m/s) | 4 |
| 6 | Maykel Massó | Cuba | 7.83 m (−0.7 m/s) | 3 |
| 7 | Thobias Montler | Sweden | 7.82 m (+0.8 m/s) | 2 |
| 8 | Emiliano Lasa | Uruguay | 7.71 m (+0.5 m/s) | 1 |
| 9 | Erwan Konaté | France | 7.63 m (−1.6 m/s) | |
| 10 | Jean-Pierre Bertrand | France | 7.31 m (−0.4 m/s) | |

Women's 200m (−0.4 m/s)
| Place | Athlete | Country | Time | Points |
|---|---|---|---|---|
| 1st place, gold medalist(s) | Gabrielle Thomas | United States | 22.05 | 8 |
| 2nd place, silver medalist(s) | Abby Steiner | United States | 22.34 | 7 |
| 3rd place, bronze medalist(s) | Marie-Josée Ta Lou | Ivory Coast | 22.34 | 6 |
| 4 | Dina Asher-Smith | Great Britain | 22.57 | 5 |
| 5 | Kayla White | United States | 22.67 | 4 |
| 6 | Jenna Prandini | United States | 22.76 | 3 |
| 7 | Tamara Clark | United States | 22.86 | 2 |
| 8 | Gémima Joseph | France | 23.34 | 1 |

Women's 400m
| Place | Athlete | Country | Time | Points |
|---|---|---|---|---|
| 1st place, gold medalist(s) | Marileidy Paulino | Dominican Republic | 49.12 | 8 |
| 2nd place, silver medalist(s) | Sydney McLaughlin-Levrone | United States | 49.71 | 7 |
| 3rd place, bronze medalist(s) | Salwa Eid Naser | Bahrain | 49.95 | 6 |
| 4 | Natalia Kaczmarek | Poland | 50.10 | 5 |
| 5 | Lieke Klaver | Netherlands | 50.32 | 4 |
| 6 | Candice McLeod | Jamaica | 50.80 | 3 |
| 7 | Anna Hall | United States | 50.82 | 2 |
| 8 | Ama Pipi | Great Britain | 51.76 | 1 |

Women's 800m
| Place | Athlete | Country | Time | Points |
|---|---|---|---|---|
| 1st place, gold medalist(s) | Keely Hodgkinson | Great Britain | 1:55.77 | 8 |
| 2nd place, silver medalist(s) | Ajeé Wilson | United States | 1:58.16 | 7 |
| 3rd place, bronze medalist(s) | Natoya Goule | Jamaica | 1:58.23 | 6 |
| 4 | Catriona Bisset | Australia | 1:58.55 | 5 |
| 5 | Noélie Yarigo | Benin | 1:58.65 | 4 |
| 6 | Halimah Nakaayi | Uganda | 1:58.81 | 3 |
| 7 | Sage Hurta | United States | 1:59.01 | 2 |
| 8 | Léna Kandissounon | France | 1:59.65 | 1 |
| 9 | Gabriela Gajanová | Slovakia | 1:59.86 | |
| 10 | Raevyn Rogers | United States | 2:00.00 | |
| 11 | Agnès Raharolahy | France | 2:00.14 | |
| | Patrycja Wyciszkiewicz | Poland | DNF | |

Women's 5000m
| Place | Athlete | Country | Time | Points |
|---|---|---|---|---|
| 1st place, gold medalist(s) | Faith Kipyegon | Kenya | 14:05.20 | 8 |
| 2nd place, silver medalist(s) | Letesenbet Gidey | Ethiopia | 14:07.94 | 7 |
| 3rd place, bronze medalist(s) | Ejgayehu Taye | Ethiopia | 14:13.31 | 6 |
| 4 | Lilian Kasait Rengeruk | Kenya | 14:23.05 | 5 |
| 5 | Freweyni Hailu | Ethiopia | 14:23.45 | 4 |
| 6 | Margaret Kipkemboi | Kenya | 14:23.67 | 3 |
| 7 | Lemlem Hailu | Ethiopia | 14:34.53 | 2 |
| 8 | Alicia Monson | United States | 14:34.88 | 1 |
| 9 | Agnes Jebet Ngetich | Kenya | 14:36.70 | |
| 10 | Grace Nawowuna | Kenya | 14:42.63 | |
| 11 | Laura Muir | Great Britain | 14:48.14 | |
| 12 | Elly Henes | United States | 15:04.54 | |
| 13 | Whittni Morgan | United States | 15:20.59 | |
| | Sarah Lahti | Sweden | DNF | |
| | Beatrice Chepkoech | Kenya | DNF | |
| | Diribe Welteji | Ethiopia | DNF | |
| | Tigist Ketema | Ethiopia | DNF | |
| | Hanna Klein | Germany | DNF | |

Women's High Jump
| Place | Athlete | Country | Mark | Points |
|---|---|---|---|---|
| 1st place, gold medalist(s) | Nicola Olyslagers | Australia | 2.00 m | 8 |
| 2nd place, silver medalist(s) | Vashti Cunningham | United States | 1.97 m | 7 |
| 3rd place, bronze medalist(s) | Angelina Topić | Serbia | 1.97 m | 6 |
| 4 | Iryna Herashchenko | Ukraine | 1.94 m | 5 |
| 5 | Morgan Lake | Great Britain | 1.94 m | 4 |
| 6 | Yuliya Levchenko | Ukraine | 1.91 m | 3 |
| 7 | Nawal Meniker | France | 1.91 m | 2 |
| 8 | Anna Hall | United States | 1.91 m | 1 |
| 9 | Nadezhda Dubovitskaya | Kazakhstan | 1.87 m | |
| 10 | Elena Vallortigara | Italy | 1.79 m | |
| 11 | Solène Gicquel | France | 1.79 m | |

Women's Pole Vault
| Place | Athlete | Country | Mark | Points |
|---|---|---|---|---|
| 1st place, gold medalist(s) | Nina Kennedy | Australia | 4.77 m | 8 |
| 2nd place, silver medalist(s) | Margot Chevrier | France | 4.71 m | 7 |
| 3rd place, bronze medalist(s) | Katie Moon | United States | 4.71 m | 6 |
| 4 | Wilma Murto | Finland | 4.61 m | 5 |
| 5 | Sandi Morris | United States | 4.61 m | 4 |
| 6 | Emily Grove | United States | 4.61 m | 3 |
| 7 | Alysha Newman | Canada | 4.46 m | 2 |
| 8 | Tina Šutej | Slovenia | 4.46 m | 1 |
| 9 | Katerina Stefanidi | Greece | 4.46 m | |
| 10 | Roberta Bruni | Italy | 4.46 m | |
| 11 | Marie-Julie Bonnin | France | 4.31 m | |
| | Ninon Chapelle | France | NM | |

Women's Shot Put
| Place | Athlete | Country | Mark | Points |
|---|---|---|---|---|
| 1st place, gold medalist(s) | Auriol Dongmo | Portugal | 19.72 m | 8 |
| 2nd place, silver medalist(s) | Chase Ealey | United States | 19.43 m | 7 |
| 3rd place, bronze medalist(s) | Maggie Ewen | United States | 19.26 m | 6 |
| 4 | Danniel Thomas-Dodd | Jamaica | 19.25 m | 5 |
| 5 | Sara Gambetta | Germany | 19.08 m | 4 |
| 6 | Song Jiayuan | China | 19.06 m | 3 |
| 7 | Jessica Woodard | United States | 18.73 m | 2 |
| 8 | Fanny Roos | Sweden | 18.44 m | 1 |
| 9 | Sarah Mitton | Canada | 18.36 m | |
| 10 | Jessica Schilder | Netherlands | 17.95 m | |
| 11 | Adelaide Aquilla | United States | 16.96 m | |

Women's Discus Throw
| Place | Athlete | Country | Mark | Points |
|---|---|---|---|---|
| 1st place, gold medalist(s) | Valarie Allman | United States | 69.04 m | 8 |
| 2nd place, silver medalist(s) | Sandra Perković | Croatia | 65.18 m | 7 |
| 3rd place, bronze medalist(s) | Kristin Pudenz | Germany | 62.87 m | 6 |
| 4 | Laulauga Tausaga | United States | 62.62 m | 5 |
| 5 | Mélina Robert-Michon | France | 61.91 m | 4 |
| 6 | Claudine Vita | Germany | 61.78 m | 3 |
| 7 | Daisy Osakue | Italy | 59.14 m | 2 |
| 8 | Amanda Ngandu-Ntumba | France | 56.95 m | 1 |
| | Liliana Cá | Portugal | NM | |

Women's Javelin Throw
| Place | Athlete | Country | Mark | Points |
|---|---|---|---|---|
| 1st place, gold medalist(s) | Haruka Kitaguchi | Japan | 65.09 m | 8 |
| 2nd place, silver medalist(s) | Kelsey-Lee Barber | Australia | 62.54 m | 7 |
| 3rd place, bronze medalist(s) | Yulenmis Aguilar | Cuba | 60.61 m | 6 |
| 4 | Liveta Jasiūnaitė | Lithuania | 60.28 m | 5 |
| 5 | Christin Hussong | Germany | 59.14 m | 4 |
| 6 | Liu Shiying | China | 58.61 m | 3 |
| 7 | Mackenzie Little | Australia | 58.54 m | 2 |
| 8 | Maggie Malone | United States | 57.67 m | 1 |
| 9 | Ariana Ince | United States | 56.12 m | |
| 10 | Elina Tzengko | Greece | 55.02 m | |
| 11 | Sigrid Borge | Norway | 52.49 m | |

=== Promotional events ===
Men's Hammer Throw
| Place | Athlete | Country | Mark |
|---|---|---|---|
| 1st place, gold medalist(s) | Ethan Katzberg | Canada | 77.93 m |
| 2nd place, silver medalist(s) | Rudy Winkler | United States | 77.63 m |
| 3rd place, bronze medalist(s) | Bence Halász | Hungary | 76.21 m |
| 4 | Yann Chaussinand | France | 74.32 m |
| 5 | Mostafa El Gamel | Egypt | 73.51 m |

Men's 4 × 100 m
| Place | Athlete | Country | Time |
|---|---|---|---|
| 1st place, gold medalist(s) | Méba-Mickaël Zeze; Jeff Erius; Ryan Zeze; Jimmy Vicaut | France | 38.22 |
| 2nd place, silver medalist(s) | Tommy Ramdhan; Oliver Bromby; Richard Kilty; Joe Ferguson | Great Britain | 38.90 |
| 3rd place, bronze medalist(s) | Robin Ganter; Julian Wagner; Joshua Hartmann; Marvin Schulte | Germany | 39.00 |
| 4 | Malachi Murray; Duan Asemota; Bolade Ajomale; Eliezer Adjibi | Canada | 39.06 |
| 5 | Antoine Thoraval; Sean Bermude; Mohammed Badru; Edmilson Varela | France | 39.51 |
| | Rendel Vermeulen; Ward Merckx; Antoine Snyders; Valentijn Hoornaert | Belgium | DNF |
| | Lorenzo Patta; Marco Ricci; Fausto Desalu; Filippo Tortu | Italy | DQ |

Women's Hammer Throw
| Place | Athlete | Country | Mark |
|---|---|---|---|
| 1st place, gold medalist(s) | Brooke Andersen | United States | 77.13 m |
| 2nd place, silver medalist(s) | Janee' Kassanavoid | United States | 74.74 m |
| 3rd place, bronze medalist(s) | Sara Fantini | Italy | 71.21 m |
| 4 | Rose Loga | France | 70.04 m |
| 5 | Alexandra Tavernier | France | 67.16 m |

Women's 4 × 100 m
| Place | Athlete | Country | Time |
|---|---|---|---|
| 1st place, gold medalist(s) | Carmen Marco; Paula García García; Paula Sevilla; Jaël Bestué | Spain | 42.99 |
| 2nd place, silver medalist(s) | Hillary Gode; Chloé Galet; Hélène Parisot; Eva Berger | France | 43.50 |
| | Sade McCreath; Khamica Bingham; Crystal Emmanuel; Natassha McDonald | Canada | DQ |
| | Carolle Zahi; Marie-Ange Rimlinger; Gémima Joseph; Mallory Leconte | France | DQ |

=== National events ===
Men's 100m
| Place | Athlete | Country | Time | Heat |
|---|---|---|---|---|
| 1st place, gold medalist(s) | Jimmy Vicaut | France | 10.06 | 2 |
| 2nd place, silver medalist(s) | Joshua Hartmann | Germany | 10.14 | 1 |
| 3rd place, bronze medalist(s) | Pablo Matéo | France | 10.16 | 2 |
| 4 | Kobe Vleminckx | Belgium | 10.23 | 2 |
| 5 | Jeff Erius | France | 10.29 | 2 |
| 6 | Andrew Morgan-Harrison | Great Britain | 10.34 | 2 |
| 7 | Matteo Melluzzo | Italy | 10.36 | 1 |
| 8 | Milo Skupin-Alfa | Germany | 10.37 | 2 |
| 9 | Joe Ferguson | Great Britain | 10.40 | 1 |
| 10 | Ward Merckx | Belgium | 10.58 | 1 |

Men's 1000m
| Place | Athlete | Country | Time |
|---|---|---|---|
| 1st place, gold medalist(s) | Gregoire Pennuen | France | 2:25.93 |
| 2nd place, silver medalist(s) | Aurelien Vaudois | France | 2:26.14 |
| 3rd place, bronze medalist(s) | Florian Creance | France | 2:26.18 |
| 4 | Jeremy Guespin | France | 2:26.40 |
| 5 | Maxence Ducoulombier-Herpin | France | 2:26.77 |
| 6 | Yassine el Garaa | Morocco | 2:27.25 |
| 7 | Barnabe Gabillet | France | 2:27.38 |
| 8 | Michael Simon | France | 2:27.49 |
| 9 | Mael Lamotte | France | 2:27.53 |
| 10 | Vivien Majorel | France | 2:28.93 |
| 11 | Fabio Fornarelli | France | 2:28.95 |
| 12 | Nelson Dakouri | France | 2:30.60 |
| 13 | Vincent Moreau | France | 2:30.89 |

Women's 100m (+1.7 m/s)
| Place | Athlete | Country | Time |
|---|---|---|---|
| 1st place, gold medalist(s) | Carolle Zahi | France | 11.40 |
| 2nd place, silver medalist(s) | Lucía Carrillo | Spain | 11.51 |
| 3rd place, bronze medalist(s) | Marie-Ange Rimlinger | France | 11.52 |
| 4 | Hillary Gode | France | 11.53 |
| 5 | Maroussia Paré | France | 11.60 |
| 6 | Eva Berger | France | 11.62 |
| 7 | Eloïse de la Taille | France | 11.64 |

Women's 1000m
| Place | Athlete | Country | Time |
|---|---|---|---|
| 1st place, gold medalist(s) | Philippine de la Bigne | France | 2:51.05 |
| 2nd place, silver medalist(s) | Rose Perotin | France | 2:52.07 |
| 3rd place, bronze medalist(s) | Ambre Grasset | France | 2:52.18 |
| 4 | Caroline Prioton | France | 2:54.80 |
| 5 | Marielle Bertin | France | 2:56.25 |
| 6 | Heloise Roquier | France | 2:57.26 |
| 7 | Azais Perronin | France | 2:58.89 |
| 8 | Alix Vermeulen | France | 2:58.99 |
| 9 | Maelle Vernhes | France | 3:00.10 |
| 10 | Margaux Caquelard | France | 3:00.49 |
| 11 | Isis Bouchet | France | 3:01.78 |
| 12 | Lou Maquaire | France | 3:03.97 |

=== Additional events ===
Men's 2 Miles
| Place | Athlete | Country | Time |
|---|---|---|---|
| 1st place, gold medalist(s) | Jakob Ingebrigtsen | Norway | 7:54.10 |
| 2nd place, silver medalist(s) | Ishmael Kipkurui | Kenya | 8:09.23 |
| 3rd place, bronze medalist(s) | Kuma Girma | Ethiopia | 8:10.34 |
| 4 | Justin Kipkoech | Kenya | 8:13.15 |
| 5 | Paul Chelimo | United States | 8:15.69 |
| 6 | Adisu Girma | Ethiopia | 8:21.43 |
| 7 | Mohamed Abdilaahi | Germany | 8:27.88 |
| 8 | Etienne Daguinos | France | 8:31.29 |
| 9 | Ali Abdilmana | Ethiopia | 8:40.65 |
| 10 | Evans Kipchumba | Kenya | 8:55.70 |
| | Benoît Campion | France | DNF |
| | Stewart McSweyn | Australia | DNF |
| | Kyumbe Munguti | Kenya | DNF |
