= 2014 Meeting Areva =

- Dates: 5 July 2014
- Host city: Saint-Denis, France
- Venue: Stade de France
- Level: 2014 Diamond League

The 2014 Meeting Areva was the 30th edition of the annual outdoor track and field meeting in Saint-Denis, France. Held on 5 July at Stade de France, it was the eighth leg of the 2014 Diamond League – the highest level international track and field circuit.

== Diamond events results ==
Podium finishers earned points towards a season leaderboard (4-2-1 respectively), points per event were then doubled in the Diamond League Finals. Athletes had to take part in the Diamond race during the finals to be eligible to win the Diamond trophy which is awarded to the athlete with the most points at the end of the season.

=== Men's ===
100 Metres
Rank	Athlete	Nation	Time	Points	Notes
1st place, gold medalist(s)	Mike Rodgers	United States	10.00	4	
2nd place, silver medalist(s)	Richard Thompson	Trinidad and Tobago	10.08	2	
3rd place, bronze medalist(s)	Kim Collins	Saint Kitts and Nevis	10.10	1	SB
4	Nesta Carter	Jamaica	10.12		
5	Kemar Bailey-Cole	Jamaica	10.14		
6	CJ Ujah	Great Britain	10.20		
7	Alonso Edward	Panama	10.26		
8	Christophe Lemaitre	France	10.28		SB
—	Nickel Ashmeade	Jamaica	DQ		R 162.7
			Wind: (−0.8 m/s)		

800 Metres
Rank	Athlete	Nation	Time	Points	Notes
1st place, gold medalist(s)	Asbel Kiprop	Kenya	1:43.34	4	WL
2nd place, silver medalist(s)	Nijel Amos	Botswana	1:43.70	2	
3rd place, bronze medalist(s)	Yeimer López	Cuba	1:43.71	1	SB
4	Pierre-Ambroise Bosse	France	1:44.23		SB
5	Ferguson Rotich	Kenya	1:44.30		SB
6	André Olivier	South Africa	1:44.42		SB
7	Marcin Lewandowski	Poland	1:44.49		SB
8	Adam Kszczot	Poland	1:44.50		SB
9	Robert Biwott	Kenya	1:45.21		
10	Kevin López	Spain	1:47.20		SB
11	Abubaker Kaki Khamis	Sudan	1:48.38		
—	Bram Som	Netherlands	DNF		

5000 Metres
Rank	Athlete	Nation	Time	Points	Notes
1st place, gold medalist(s)	Edwin Soi	Kenya	12:59.82	4	WL
2nd place, silver medalist(s)	Yenew Alamirew	Ethiopia	13:00.21	2	SB
3rd place, bronze medalist(s)	Paul Tanui	Kenya	13:00.53	1	PB
4	Galen Rupp	United States	13:00.99		SB
5	Thomas Longosiwa	Kenya	13:01.74		SB
6	Lawi Lalang	Kenya	13:03.85		SB
7	Caleb Ndiku	Kenya	13:08.47		
8	Muktar Edris	Ethiopia	13:09.08		SB
9	Ibrahim Jeilan	Ethiopia	13:09.67		
10	Imane Merga	Ethiopia	13:11.94		SB
11	Ben True	United States	13:13.30		
12	Hagos Gebrhiwet	Ethiopia	13:20.17		
13	Arne Gabius	Germany	13:25.50		SB
14	Birhanu Legese	Ethiopia	13:33.53		
—	Jonathan Ndiku	Kenya	DNF		
—	Geoffrey Rono	Kenya	DNF		
—	Bouabdellah Tahri	France	DNF		
—	Cornelius Kangogo	Kenya	DNF		

400 Metres hurdles
Rank	Athlete	Nation	Time	Points	Notes
1st place, gold medalist(s)	Michael Tinsley	United States	48.25	4	SB
2nd place, silver medalist(s)	Cornel Fredericks	South Africa	48.42	2	SB
3rd place, bronze medalist(s)	Javier Culson	Puerto Rico	48.45	1	
4	Félix Sánchez	Dominican Republic	48.91		SB
5	Mamadou Kassé Hann	Senegal	49.29		
6	Ashton Eaton	United States	49.58		
7	Niall Flannery	Great Britain	49.73		
8	Johnny Dutch	United States	49.98		

Pole vault
Rank	Athlete	Nation	Height	Points	Notes
1st place, gold medalist(s)	Renaud Lavillenie	France	5.70 m	4	
2nd place, silver medalist(s)	Kévin Menaldo	France	5.70 m	2	SB
2nd place, silver medalist(s)	Augusto Dutra de Oliveira	Brazil	5.70 m	1	
4	Piotr Lisek	Poland	5.60 m		
5	Konstantinos Filippidis	Greece	5.60 m		
6	Mark Hollis	United States	5.60 m		
7	Paweł Wojciechowski	Poland	5.45 m		
7	Damiel Dossevi	France	5.45 m		
—	Steven Lewis	Great Britain	NM		
—	Valentin Lavillenie	France	NM		
—	Seito Yamamoto	Japan	NM		
—	Brad Walker	United States	NM		

Triple jump
Rank	Athlete	Nation	Distance	Points	Notes
1st place, gold medalist(s)	Benjamin Compaoré	France	17.12 m (+1.8 m/s)	4	SB
2nd place, silver medalist(s)	Christian Taylor	United States	17.11 m (+0.6 m/s)	2	
3rd place, bronze medalist(s)	Alexis Copello	Cuba	17.04 m (−0.3 m/s)	1	
4	Nelson Évora	Portugal	16.97 m (±0.0 m/s)		SB
5	Ernesto Revé	Cuba	16.94 m (+0.9 m/s)		
6	Aleksey Fyodorov	Russia	16.84 m (−0.2 m/s)		
7	Will Claye	United States	16.79 m (−0.1 m/s)		
8	Daniele Greco	Italy	16.68 m (+0.5 m/s)		
9	Yoann Rapinier	France	16.06 m (−2.0 m/s)		
10	Chris Benard	United States	15.76 m (+0.8 m/s)		
11	Marian Oprea	Romania	14.96 m (±0.0 m/s)		

Shot put
Rank	Athlete	Nation	Distance	Points	Notes
1st place, gold medalist(s)	David Storl	Germany	21.41 m	4	
2nd place, silver medalist(s)	Reese Hoffa	United States	21.38 m	2	
3rd place, bronze medalist(s)	Kurt Roberts	United States	20.67 m	1	
4	Tomasz Majewski	Poland	20.14 m		
5	Ryan Whiting	United States	19.92 m		
6	Ladislav Prášil	Czech Republic	19.90 m		
7	Marco Fortes	Portugal	19.75 m		
8	Joe Kovacs	United States	19.46 m		

Javelin throw
Rank	Athlete	Nation	Distance	Points	Notes
1st place, gold medalist(s)	Ihab Abdelrahman	Egypt	87.10 m	4	
2nd place, silver medalist(s)	Tero Pitkämäki	Finland	86.63 m	2	SB
3rd place, bronze medalist(s)	Thomas Röhler	Germany	84.74 m	1	PB
4	Ryohei Arai	Japan	81.52 m		
5	Vítězslav Veselý	Czech Republic	81.43 m		
6	Łukasz Grzeszczuk	Poland	81.04 m		
7	Andreas Thorkildsen	Norway	80.79 m		SB
8	Zigismunds Sirmais	Latvia	77.99 m		
9	Petr Frydrych	Czech Republic	76.44 m		
10	Julius Yego	Kenya	71.06 m		
—	Kim Amb	Sweden	NM		

=== Women's ===
200 Metres
Rank	Athlete	Nation	Time	Points	Notes
1st place, gold medalist(s)	Blessing Okagbare	Nigeria	22.32	4	
2nd place, silver medalist(s)	Allyson Felix	United States	22.34	2	SB
3rd place, bronze medalist(s)	Anthonique Strachan	Bahamas	22.54	1	
4	Myriam Soumaré	France	22.60		SB
5	Shelly-Ann Fraser-Pryce	Jamaica	22.63		
6	Simone Facey	Jamaica	22.75		
7	Jamile Samuel	Netherlands	22.81		SB
8	Kimberlyn Duncan	United States	23.01		
			Wind: (+0.4 m/s)		

400 Metres
Rank	Athlete	Nation	Time	Points	Notes
1st place, gold medalist(s)	Sanya Richards-Ross	United States	50.10	4	
2nd place, silver medalist(s)	Stephenie Ann McPherson	Jamaica	50.40	2	SB
3rd place, bronze medalist(s)	Novlene Williams-Mills	Jamaica	50.68	1	
4	Amantle Montsho	Botswana	50.70		
5	Olha Zemlyak	Ukraine	51.35		
6	Natasha Hastings	United States	51.74		
7	Floria Gueï	France	51.89		
8	Marie Gayot	France	52.05		

1500 Metres
Rank	Athlete	Nation	Time	Points	Notes
1st place, gold medalist(s)	Sifan Hassan	Netherlands	3:57.00	4	NR, WL
2nd place, silver medalist(s)	Jenny Simpson	United States	3:57.22	2	PB
3rd place, bronze medalist(s)	Hellen Obiri	Kenya	3:58.89	1	
4	Faith Kipyegon	Kenya	3:59.21		
5	Shannon Rowbury	United States	3:59.49		PB
6	Laura Muir	Great Britain	4:00.07		PB
7	Mimi Belete	Bahrain	4:00.08		PB
8	Laura Weightman	Great Britain	4:00.17		PB
9	Axumawit Embaye	Ethiopia	4:02.35		PB
10	Abeba Aregawi	Sweden	4:03.46		
11	Luiza Gega	Albania	4:03.75		
12	Morgan Uceny	United States	4:04.76		SB
13	Nicole Sifuentes	Canada	4:04.87		SB
—	Tamara Tverdostup	Ukraine	DNF		
—	Phoebe Wright	United States	DNF		
—	Rababe Arafi	Morocco	DNF		
—	Malika Akkaoui	Morocco	DNF		

100 Metres hurdles
Rank	Athlete	Nation	Time	Points	Notes
1st place, gold medalist(s)	Dawn Harper-Nelson	United States	12.44	4	WL
2nd place, silver medalist(s)	Queen Claye	United States	12.46	2	SB
3rd place, bronze medalist(s)	Lolo Jones	United States	12.68	1	
4	Cindy Billaud	France	12.71		
5	Tiffany Porter	Great Britain	12.72		
6	Sally Pearson	Australia	12.89		
7	Kristi Castlin	United States	12.96		
8	Nadine Hildebrand	Germany	13.00		
9	Tenaya Jones	United States	13.07		
			Wind: (±0.0 m/s)		

3000 Metres steeplechase
Rank	Athlete	Nation	Time	Points	Notes
1st place, gold medalist(s)	Hiwot Ayalew	Ethiopia	9:11.65	4	MR
2nd place, silver medalist(s)	Emma Coburn	United States	9:14.12	2	PB
3rd place, bronze medalist(s)	Sofia Assefa	Ethiopia	9:18.71	1	
4	Etenesh Diro	Ethiopia	9:19.71		SB
5	Salima El Ouali Alami	Morocco	9:21.24		NR
6	Lydiah Chepkurui	Kenya	9:24.07		SB
7	Stephanie Garcia	United States	9:24.35		PB
8	Milcah Chemos Cheywa	Kenya	9:26.49		SB
9	Purity Cherotich Kirui	Kenya	9:26.95		
10	Birtukan Adamu	Ethiopia	9:31.03		
11	Hyvin Jepkemoi	Kenya	9:34.51		
12	Gesa Felicitas Krause	Germany	9:38.40		SB
13	Eilish McColgan	Great Britain	9:54.56		
—	Virginia Nyambura Nganga	Kenya	DNF		

High jump
Rank	Athlete	Nation	Height	Points	Notes
1st place, gold medalist(s)	Blanka Vlašić	Croatia	2.00 m	4	SB
2nd place, silver medalist(s)	Mariya Lasitskene	Russia	2.00 m	2	PB
3rd place, bronze medalist(s)	Ana Šimić	Croatia	1.94 m	1	
4	Ruth Beitia	Spain	1.94 m		
5	Oksana Okunyeva	Ukraine	1.94 m		
6	Justyna Kasprzycka	Poland	1.94 m		
~~6~~	~~Inika McPherson~~	~~United States~~	~~1.94 m~~		DQ (Note: Due to doping violations McPherson's results during this competition were disqualified.)
7	Svetlana Radzivil	Uzbekistan	1.92 m		
8	Beloved Promise	United States	1.89 m		
9	Irina Gordeeva	Russia	1.89 m		
9	Kamila Lićwinko	Poland	1.89 m		

Long jump
Rank	Athlete	Nation	Distance	Points	Notes
1st place, gold medalist(s)	Éloyse Lesueur-Aymonin	France	6.92 m (+0.4 m/s)	4	PB
2nd place, silver medalist(s)	Brittney Reese	United States	6.87 m (−0.2 m/s)	2	
3rd place, bronze medalist(s)	Ivana Španović	Serbia	6.78 m (−0.6 m/s)	1	
4	Shara Proctor	Great Britain	6.70 m (+0.8 m/s)		
5	Darya Klishina	Russia	6.63 m (−0.3 m/s)		
6	Tianna Bartoletta	United States	6.60 m (−0.3 m/s)		
7	Sosthene Moguenara	Germany	6.59 m (−0.2 m/s)		
8	Irène Pusterla	Switzerland	6.57 m (−0.3 m/s)		
9	Volha Sudarava	Belarus	6.40 m (+0.4 m/s)		
10	Funmi Jimoh	United States	6.37 m (−0.7 m/s)		

Discus throw
Rank	Athlete	Nation	Distance	Points	Notes
1st place, gold medalist(s)	Sandra Elkasević	Croatia	68.48 m	4	MR
2nd place, silver medalist(s)	Dani Stevens	Australia	67.40 m	2	
3rd place, bronze medalist(s)	Gia Lewis-Smallwood	United States	65.59 m	1	
4	Mélina Robert-Michon	France	64.17 m		
5	Denia Caballero	Cuba	63.29 m		
6	Shanice Craft	Germany	63.21 m		
7	Yaime Pérez	Cuba	62.72 m		
8	Julia Harting	Germany	61.13 m		
9	Anna Rüh	Germany	61.10 m		
~~10~~	~~Yekaterina Strokova~~	~~Russia~~	~~60.06 m~~		DQ (Note: Due to doping violations Strokova's results during this competition were disqualified.)

== Promotional events results ==
=== Men's ===
110 Metres Hurdles
Rank	Athlete	Nation	Time	Notes
1st place, gold medalist(s)	Hansle Parchment	Jamaica	12.94	NR, WL
2nd place, silver medalist(s)	Pascal Martinot-Lagarde	France	13.05	PB
3rd place, bronze medalist(s)	Orlando Ortega	Cuba	13.10	SB
4	Ryan Wilson	United States	13.18	SB
5	David Oliver	United States	13.26	
6	Dimitri Bascou	France	13.27	
7	Yordan O'Farrill	Cuba	13.35	
8	Jason Richardson	United States	13.53	
9	Ladji Doucouré	France	13.63	
			Wind: (+0.8 m/s)	

== See also ==
- 2014 Diamond League
