= 2019 Meeting de Paris =

25th edition of the annual Meeting de Paris

- Dates: 24 August 2019
- Host city: Paris, France
- Venue: Stade Sébastien Charléty
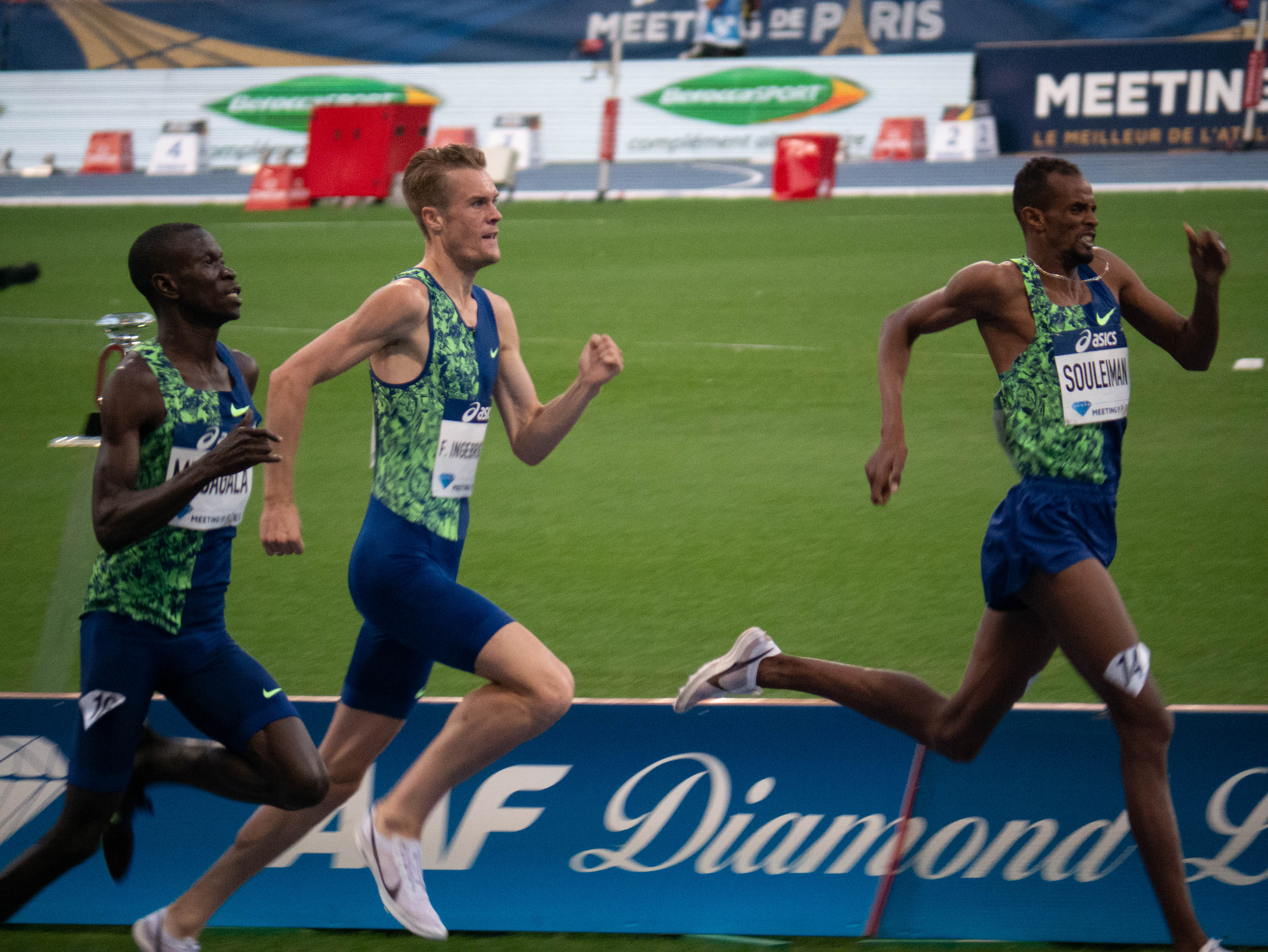
- Level: 2019 IAAF Diamond League
- Events: 13

The 2019 Meeting de Paris was the 25th edition of the annual outdoor track and field meeting in Paris, France. Held on 24 August at the Stade Sébastien Charléty, it was the twelfth leg of the 2019 IAAF Diamond League – the highest level international track and field circuit. This was the first time the meeting was held on the stadium's renovated blue running track.

Despite no world-leading performances, three meeting records were set at the competition, all in the men's section. American Noah Lyles improved on Usain Bolt's time in the 200 metres with his finish in 19.65 seconds, another American Will Claye had a triple jump of 18.06 m to better Jonathan Edwards's former mark, and New Zealand's Tom Walsh set a new standard in the shot put with 22.44 m (73 ft 7 1/4 in). Further to this, two national records were improved during the competition. In the men's 1500 metres, Ronald Musagala gave a fast finish to equal the Ugandan record of 3:30.58 minutes, while in the women's pole vault Alysha Newman set a Canadian record of 4.82 m (15 ft 9 3/4 in). These performances by Musagala and Newman were their first career wins on the Diamond League.

== Results ==
=== Men ===
200 m (+0.2 m/s)
Place	Athlete	Time	Points
1	Noah Lyles (USA)	19.65 MR	8
2	Ramil Guliyev (TUR)	20.01	7
3	Aaron Brown (CAN)	20.13	6
4	Álex Quiñónez (ECU)	20.25	5
5	Christophe Lemaitre (FRA)	20.40	4
6	Divine Oduduru (NGR)	20.50	3
7	Méba-Mickaël Zeze (FRA)	20.88	2
—	Clarence Munyai (RSA)	DNS	—

1500 m
Place	Athlete	Time	Points
1	Ronald Musagala (UGA)	3:30.58 =NR	8
2	Ayanleh Souleiman (DJI)	3:30.66	7
3	Filip Ingebrigtsen (NOR)	3:31.06	6
4	Jakob Ingebrigtsen (NOR)	3:31.33	5
5	Bethwell Birgen (KEN)	3:31.45	4
6	Abdalaati Iguider (MAR)	3:31.64	3
7	Taoufik Makhloufi (ALG)	3:31.77	2
8	Stewart McSweyn (AUS)	3:31.81 =PB	1

110 m hurdles (+0.8 m/s)
Place	Athlete	Time	Points
1	Daniel Roberts (USA)	13.08	8
2	Orlando Ortega (ESP)	13.14	7
3	Freddie Crittenden (USA)	13.17 PB	6
4	Ronald Levy (JAM)	13.22	5
5	Pascal Martinot-Lagarde (FRA)	13.24	4
6	Grant Holloway (USA)	13.25	3
7	Xie Wenjun (CHN)	13.46	2
8	Sergey Shubenkov	13.88	1

400 m hurdles
Place	Athlete	Mark	Points
1	Karsten Warholm (NOR)	47.26	8
2	Ludvy Vaillant (FRA)	48.30 PB	7
3	Kyron McMaster (IVB)	48.33	6
4	Yasmani Copello (TUR)	48.47	5
5	TJ Holmes (USA)	49.04	4
6	David Kendziera (USA)	49.16	3
7	Thomas Barr (IRL)	49.32	2
—	Wilfried Happio (FRA)	DNS	—

3000 m steeplechase
Place	Athlete	Mark	Points
1	Soufiane El Bakkali (MAR)	8:06.64	8
2	Benjamin Kigen (KEN)	8:07.09	7
3	Lamecha Girma (ETH)	8:08.63	6
4	Chala Beyo (ETH)	8:09.36	5
5	Conseslus Kipruto (KEN)	8:13.75	4
6	Nicholas Kiptanui Bett (KEN)	8:14.18	3
7	Stanley Kebenei (USA)	8:14.20	2
8	Ibrahim Ezzaydouni (ESP)	8:14.49 PB	1

High jump
Place	Athlete	Mark	Points
1	Michael Mason (CAN)	2.28 m	8
2	Andriy Protsenko (UKR)	2.28 m	7
3	Ilya Ivanyuk	2.28 m	6
4	Mateusz Przybylko (GER)	2.26 m	5
4	Jeron Robinson (USA)	2.26 m	5
6	Mathew Sawe (KEN)	2.26 m	3
7	Tihomir Ivanov (BUL)	2.23 m	2
7	Ryo Sato (JPN)	2.23 m	2

Triple jump
Place	Athlete	Mark	Points
1	Will Claye (USA)	18.06 m (+0.4 m/s) MR	8
2	Christian Taylor (USA)	17.82 m (+0.2 m/s)	7
3	Omar Craddock (USA)	17.28 m (+0.9 m/s)	6
4	Hugues Fabrice Zango (BUR)	17.14 m (−0.7 m/s)	5
5	Benjamin Compaoré (FRA)	17.05 m (+0.9 m/s)	4
6	Zhu Yaming (CHN)	16.99 m (−0.1 m/s)	3
7	Nelson Évora (POR)	16.82 m (−1.0 m/s)	2
8	Alexis Copello (AZE)	16.64 m (+0.2 m/s)	1

Shot put
Place	Athlete	Mark	Points
1	Tomas Walsh (NZL)	22.44 m MR	8
2	Joe Kovacs (USA)	22.11 m	7
3	Darlan Romani (BRA)	21.56 m	6
4	Michał Haratyk (POL)	21.34 m	5
5	Tomáš Staněk (CZE)	21.30 m	4
6	Filip Mihaljević (CRO)	21.22 m	3
7	Konrad Bukowiecki (POL)	21.20 m	2
8	Bob Bertemes (LUX)	21.20 m	1

=== Women ===
100 m (−0.2 m/s)
Place	Athlete	Time	Points
1	Elaine Thompson (JAM)	10.98	8
2	Marie-Josée Ta Lou (CIV)	11.13	7
3	Dafne Schippers (NED)	11.15	6
4	Teahna Daniels (USA)	11.16	5
5	Aleia Hobbs (USA)	11.16	4
6	Jonielle Smith (JAM)	11.17	3
7	Carolle Zahi (FRA)	11.25	2
8	Natalliah Whyte (JAM)	11.25	2

400 m
Place	Athlete	Time	Points
1	Stephenie Ann McPherson (JAM)	51.11	8
2	Kendall Ellis (USA)	51.21	7
3	Shakima Wimbley (USA)	51.50	6
4	Phyllis Francis (USA)	51.56	5
5	Lisanne de Witte (NED)	51.83	4
6	Christine Botlogetswe (BOT)	52.02	3
7	Déborah Sananes (FRA)	52.04	2
8	Amandine Brossier (FRA)	53.29	1

800 m
Place	Athlete	Time	Points
1	Hanna Green (USA)	1:58.39	8
2	Natoya Goule (JAM)	1:58.39	7
3	Winnie Nanyondo (UGA)	1:58.83	6
4	Olha Lyakhova (UKR)	1:59.13	5
5	Kate Grace (USA)	1:59.13	4
6	Raevyn Rogers (USA)	1:59.50	3
7	Gudaf Tsegay (ETH)	1:59.52 PB	2
8	Rénelle Lamote (FRA)	2:00.40	1

Pole vault
Place	Athlete	Time	Points
1	Alysha Newman (CAN)	4.82 m NR	8
2	Katerina Stefanidi (GRE)	4.75 m	7
3	Sandi Morris (USA)	4.75 m	6
4	Anzhelika Sidorova	4.75 m	5
5	Robeilys Peinado (VEN)	4.65 m	4
6	Katie Nageotte (USA)	4.65 m	3
7	Yarisley Silva (CUB)	4.55 m	2
8	Ninon Guillon-Romarin (FRA)	4.40 m	1

Triple jump
Place	Athlete	Time	Points
1	Yulimar Rojas (VEN)	15.05 m (−0.7 m/s)	8
2	Liadagmis Povea (CUB)	14.75 m (+0.4 m/s)	7
3	Keturah Orji (USA)	14.72 m (+1.7 m/s) PB	6
4	Shanieka Ricketts (JAM)	14.71 m (+1.0 m/s)	5
5	Ana Peleteiro (ESP)	14.59 m (+0.4 m/s) PB	4
6	Kimberly Williams (JAM)	14.45 m (+1.2 m/s)	3
7	Olha Saladukha (UKR)	14.30 m (+0.3 m/s)	2
8	Olga Rypakova (KAZ)	14.16 m (+0.4 m/s)	1

Discus throw
Place	Athlete	Time	Points
1	Denia Caballero (CUB)	66.91 m	8
2	Sandra Perković (CRO)	65.01 m	7
3	Feng Bin (CHN)	64.60 m	6
4	Kristin Pudenz (GER)	64.37 m =PB	5
5	Valarie Allman (USA)	63.69 m	4
6	Mélina Robert-Michon (FRA)	62.62 m	3
7	Nadine Müller (GER)	62.32 m	2
8	Andressa de Morais (BRA)	62.00 m	1
