= 2010 Meeting Areva =

- Dates: 16 July 2010
- Host city: Saint-Denis, France
- Venue: Stade de France
- Level: 2010 Diamond League

The 2010 Meeting Areva was the 26th edition of the annual outdoor track and field meeting in Saint-Denis, France. Held on 16 July at Stade de France, it was the ninth leg of the 2010 Diamond League – the highest level international track and field circuit.

== Diamond events results ==
Podium finishers earned points towards a season leaderboard (4-2-1 respectively), points per event were then doubled in the Diamond League Finals. Athletes had to take part in the Diamond race during the finals to be eligible to win the Diamond trophy which is awarded to the athlete with the most points at the end of the season.

=== Men's ===
100 Metres
Rank	Athlete	Nation	Time	Points	Notes
1st place, gold medalist(s)	Usain Bolt	Jamaica	9.84	4	
2nd place, silver medalist(s)	Asafa Powell	Jamaica	9.91	2	
3rd place, bronze medalist(s)	Yohan Blake	Jamaica	9.95	1	PB
4	Daniel Bailey	Antigua and Barbuda	10.00		=SB
5	Christophe Lemaitre	France	10.09		
6	Churandy Martina	Netherlands Antilles	10.09		
7	Trell Kimmons	United States	10.14		
8	Martial Mbandjock	France	10.20		
			Wind: (−0.3 m/s)		

400 Metres
Rank	Athlete	Nation	Time	Points	Notes
1st place, gold medalist(s)	Jeremy Wariner	United States	44.49	4	WL
2nd place, silver medalist(s)	Jermaine Gonzales	Jamaica	44.63	2	PB
3rd place, bronze medalist(s)	Jonathan Borlée	Belgium	44.77	1	NR
4	Michael Bingham	Great Britain	45.53		
5	Leslie Djhone	France	45.58		
6	Greg Nixon	United States	45.81		
7	Renny Quow	Trinidad and Tobago	45.81		
8	David Neville	United States	45.83		

800 Metres
Rank	Athlete	Nation	Time	Points	Notes
1st place, gold medalist(s)	Abubaker Kaki Khamis	Sudan	1:43.50	4	
2nd place, silver medalist(s)	Mbulaeni Mulaudzi	South Africa	1:44.11	2	
3rd place, bronze medalist(s)	Bram Som	Netherlands	1:44.58	1	SB
4	Andrew Wheating	United States	1:44.62		PB
5	Jackson Kivuva	Kenya	1:44.62		
6	Nick Symmonds	United States	1:44.93		SB
7	Augustine Kiprono Choge	Kenya	1:45.61		SB
8	Richard Kiplagat	Kenya	1:45.81		
9	Hamid Oualich	France	1:46.85		
—	Khadevis Robinson	United States	DNF		
—	Marcin Lewandowski	Poland	DQ		R 163.3

110 Metres hurdles
Rank	Athlete	Nation	Time	Points	Notes
1st place, gold medalist(s)	David Oliver	United States	12.89	4	NR, WL
2nd place, silver medalist(s)	Ryan Wilson	United States	13.12	2	
3rd place, bronze medalist(s)	Ronnie Ash	United States	13.21	1	
4	Joel Brown	United States	13.25		
5	Dwight Thomas	Jamaica	13.30		
6	Andy Turner	Great Britain	13.37		
7	Dimitri Bascou	France	13.45		
8	John Yarbrough	United States	13.57		
9	Bano Traoré	France	13.61		
			Wind: (+0.5 m/s)		

3000 Metres steeplechase
Rank	Athlete	Nation	Time	Points	Notes
1st place, gold medalist(s)	Brimin Kipruto	Kenya	8:00.90	4	MR, WL
2nd place, silver medalist(s)	Paul Kipsiele Koech	Kenya	8:02.07	2	SB
3rd place, bronze medalist(s)	Ezekiel Kemboi	Kenya	8:03.79	1	SB
4	Benjamin Kiplagat	Uganda	8:04.48		
5	Richard Mateelong	Kenya	8:06.44		SB
6	Tarık Langat Akdağ	Kenya	8:14.26		
7	Elijah Kipterege	Kenya	8:17.79		
8	Tomasz Szymkowiak	Poland	8:18.23		PB
9	Michael Kipyego	Kenya	8:19.30		
10	Daniel Huling	United States	8:19.33		
11	Vincent Zouaoui-Dandrieux	France	8:21.27		SB
12	Noureddine Smaïl	France	8:22.67		PB
13	Mustafa Mohamed	Sweden	8:22.98		SB
14	Steve Slattery	United States	8:33.50		
15	Irba Lakhal	France	8:35.29		SB
—	Brahim Taleb	Morocco	DNF		
—	Haron Lagat	Kenya	DNF		PM
—	Vincent Le Dauphin	France	DNF		PM

Pole vault
Rank	Athlete	Nation	Height	Points	Notes
1st place, gold medalist(s)	Renaud Lavillenie	France	5.91 m	4	
2nd place, silver medalist(s)	Derek Miles	United States	5.70 m	2	
3rd place, bronze medalist(s)	Maksym Mazuryk	Ukraine	5.70 m	1	SB
3rd place, bronze medalist(s)	Łukasz Michalski	Poland	5.70 m	1	
5	Michal Balner	Czech Republic	5.60 m		
6	Przemysław Czerwiński	Poland	5.60 m		
7	Romain Mesnil	France	5.60 m		
8	Giovanni Lanaro	Mexico	5.40 m		
8	Giuseppe Gibilisco	Italy	5.40 m		
8	Damiel Dossevi	France	5.40 m		
11	Jérôme Clavier	France	5.40 m		
—	Steve Hooker	Australia	NM		

Triple jump
Rank	Athlete	Nation	Distance	Points	Notes
1st place, gold medalist(s)	Arnie David Giralt	Cuba	17.49 m (+0.5 m/s)	4	SB
2nd place, silver medalist(s)	Alexis Copello	Cuba	17.45 m (+0.5 m/s)	2	
3rd place, bronze medalist(s)	Viktor Kuznyetsov	Ukraine	17.21 m (+0.3 m/s)	1	
4	Phillips Idowu	Great Britain	17.20 m (+0.4 m/s)		
5	Yoandri Betanzos	Cuba	16.99 m (+0.5 m/s)		
6	Randy Lewis	Grenada	16.81 m (+0.1 m/s)		
7	Marian Oprea	Romania	16.80 m (+0.2 m/s)		
8	Fabrizio Donato	Italy	16.74 m (+0.3 m/s)		
9	Leevan Sands	Bahamas	16.43 m (+0.3 m/s)		
10	Jules Lechanga	France	16.29 m (+0.4 m/s)		

Javelin throw
Rank	Athlete	Nation	Distance	Points	Notes
1st place, gold medalist(s)	Andreas Thorkildsen	Norway	87.50 m	4	
2nd place, silver medalist(s)	Teemu Wirkkala	Finland	83.77 m	2	
3rd place, bronze medalist(s)	Tero Pitkämäki	Finland	83.33 m	1	
4	Jarrod Bannister	Australia	80.13 m		
5	Ari Mannio	Finland	79.13 m		
6	Oleksandr Pyatnytsya	Ukraine	79.08 m		
7	Stuart Farquhar	New Zealand	77.93 m		
8	Vadims Vasiļevskis	Latvia	75.44 m		
9	Jérôme Haeffler	France	70.37 m		
—	Guillermo Martínez	Cuba	NM		

=== Women's ===
200 Metres
Rank	Athlete	Nation	Time	Points	Notes
1st place, gold medalist(s)	Allyson Felix	United States	22.14	4	
2nd place, silver medalist(s)	Shalonda Solomon	United States	22.55	2	
3rd place, bronze medalist(s)	Debbie Ferguson-McKenzie	Bahamas	22.62	1	SB
4	Sherone Simpson	Jamaica	22.65		
5	Kelly-Ann Baptiste	Trinidad and Tobago	22.78		SB
6	Bianca Knight	United States	22.83		
7	Porscha Lucas	United States	22.85		
8	Lina Jacques-Sébastien	France	23.12		
			Wind: (±0.0 m/s)		

1500 Metres
Rank	Athlete	Nation	Time	Points	Notes
1st place, gold medalist(s)	~~Anna Alminova~~	~~Russia~~	~~3:57.65~~	~~4~~	DQ (Note: Due to doping violations Alminova's results during this competition were disqualified.)
2nd place, silver medalist(s)	Christin Wurth-Thomas	United States	3:59.59	2	PB
3rd place, bronze medalist(s)	Hind Dehiba	France	3:59.76	1	NR
4	Lisa Dobriskey	Great Britain	3:59.79		SB
5	Fanjanteino Félix	France	4:01.17		PB
6	Shannon Rowbury	United States	4:01.30		SB
7	Mimi Belete	Bahrain	4:01.59		PB
8	Stephanie Twell	Great Britain	4:03.71		SB
9	Btissam Lakhouad	Morocco	4:04.16		
10	Ingvill Måkestad Bovim	Norway	4:04.22		PB
11	Siham Hilali	Morocco	4:04.87		
12	Viola Kibiwot	Kenya	4:05.53		
13	Maryam Yusuf Jamal	Bahrain	4:06.09		
14	Hilary Stellingwerff	Canada	4:06.99		PB
15	Anna Willard	United States	4:07.92		
—	Gelete Burka	Ethiopia	DNF		
—	Elisa Cusma	Italy	DNF		
—	Sylwia Ejdys	Poland	DNF		
—	Tamara Tverdostup	Ukraine	DNF		PM

5000 Metres
Rank	Athlete	Nation	Time	Points	Notes
1st place, gold medalist(s)	Vivian Cheruiyot	Kenya	14:27.41	4	MR, WL
2nd place, silver medalist(s)	Sentayehu Ejigu	Ethiopia	14:28.39	2	PB
3rd place, bronze medalist(s)	Elvan Abeylegesse	Turkey	14:31.52	1	SB
4	Meselech Melkamu	Ethiopia	14:32.73		
5	Jéssica Augusto	Portugal	14:37.07		PB
6	Iness Chepkesis Chenonge	Kenya	14:39.19		PB
7	Margaret Muriuki	Kenya	14:50.73		
8	Molly Huddle	United States	14:51.84		PB
9	Florence Kiplagat	Kenya	14:52.64		SB
10	Sylvia Jebiwot Kibet	Kenya	14:54.71		
11	Lisa Uhl	United States	14:55.74		PB
12	Belaynesh Oljira	Ethiopia	14:58.16		PB
13	Jo Pavey	Great Britain	15:02.31		SB
14	Gladys Chemweno	Kenya	15:03.87		PB
15	René Kalmer	South Africa	15:44.08		SB
—	Adriënne Herzog	Netherlands	DNF		
—	Zakia Mrisho Mohamed	Tanzania	DNF		PM
—	Mercy Wanjiku	Kenya	DNF		PM

High Jump
Rank	Athlete	Nation	Height	Points	Notes
1st place, gold medalist(s)	Blanka Vlašić	Croatia	2.02 m	4	MR
2nd place, silver medalist(s)	Chaunté Lowe	United States	2.00 m	2	
3rd place, bronze medalist(s)	Svetlana Shkolina	Russia	1.96 m	1	
4	Nadiya Dusanova	Uzbekistan	1.93 m		
5	Vita Styopina	Ukraine	1.90 m		
6	Irina Gordeeva	Russia	1.90 m		
7	Emma Green	Sweden	1.82 m		
8	Melanie Skotnik	France	1.82 m		

Long Jump
Rank	Athlete	Nation	Distance	Points	Notes
1st place, gold medalist(s)	Brittney Reese	United States	6.79 m (+0.7 m/s)	4	
2nd place, silver medalist(s)	Naide Gomes	Portugal	6.73 m (+0.6 m/s)	2	
3rd place, bronze medalist(s)	Yargelis Savigne	Cuba	6.73 m (+0.5 m/s)	1	
4	Darya Klishina	Russia	6.61 m (±0.0 m/s)		
5	Tatyana Kotova	Russia	6.58 m (+0.2 m/s)		
6	Olga Kucherenko	Russia	6.56 m (±0.0 m/s)		
7	Funmi Jimoh	United States	6.56 m (+1.1 m/s)		
8	Éloyse Lesueur-Aymonin	France	6.53 m (+0.2 m/s)		
9	Blessing Okagbare	Nigeria	6.44 m (+0.3 m/s)		
10	Eunice Barber	France	6.41 m (+1.0 m/s)		
11	Brianna Glenn	United States	6.38 m (+0.5 m/s)		
12	Karin Melis Mey	Turkey	6.26 m (+0.5 m/s)		

Shot Put
Rank	Athlete	Nation	Distance	Points	Notes
1st place, gold medalist(s)	~~Nadzeya Astapchuk~~	~~Belarus~~	~~20.78 m~~	~~4~~	DQ (Note: Due to doping violations Astapchuk's results during this competition were disqualified.)
2nd place, silver medalist(s)	Valerie Adams	New Zealand	20.13 m	2	
3rd place, bronze medalist(s)	~~Natallia Mikhnevich~~	~~Belarus~~	~~19.47 m~~	~~1~~	DQ (Note: Due to doping violations Mikhnevich's results during this competition were disqualified.)
4	Misleydis González	Cuba	18.83 m		
5	Nadine Kleinert	Germany	18.43 m		
6	Jillian Camarena-Williams	United States	18.30 m		
7	Michelle Carter	United States	18.17 m		
8	Jessica Cérival	France	17.53 m		
9	Laurence Manfredi	France	17.23 m		

Discus Throw
Rank	Athlete	Nation	Distance	Points	Notes
1st place, gold medalist(s)	Yarelys Barrios	Cuba	65.53 m	4	MR
2nd place, silver medalist(s)	Nicoleta Grasu	Romania	63.78 m	2	SB
3rd place, bronze medalist(s)	Sandra Elkasević	Croatia	63.62 m	1	
4	Dani Stevens	Australia	62.10 m		
5	Nadine Müller	Germany	61.73 m		
6	Becky Breisch	United States	60.86 m		
7	Aretha Thurmond	United States	60.83 m		
8	Věra Pospíšilová-Cechlová	Czech Republic	59.36 m		
9	Stephanie Brown Trafton	United States	59.03 m		
—	Żaneta Glanc	Poland	NM		

== See also ==
- 2010 Diamond League
