= 2006 IAAF Golden League =

Athletics competition series

The 2006 Golden League was the ninth edition of the IAAF's annual series of six athletics meets, held across Europe, with athletes having the chance to win the Golden League Jackpot of $1 million.

== Programme ==
Meet calendar
Meeting	Venue	Date
Bislett Games	Oslo, Norway	2 June
Meeting Gaz de France	Paris, France	8 July
Golden Gala	Rome, Italy	14 July
Weltklasse Zürich	Zürich, Switzerland	18 August
Memorial Van Damme	Brussels, Belgium	25 August
Internationales Stadionfest	Berlin, Germany	3 September

Jackpot events
Men	100 m	400 m	1500 m / Mile	5000 m	Long jump	Javelin throw
Women	100 m	400 m	5000 m	100 m hurdles	High jump	

== Results ==
=== Men ===
Event	Bislett Games Oslo	Meeting Gaz de France Paris	Golden Gala Rome	Weltklasse Zürich Zürich	Memorial van Damme Brussels	ISTAF Berlin
100 m	Asafa Powell (JAM); 9.98	Asafa Powell (JAM); 9.85	Asafa Powell (JAM); 9.85	Asafa Powell (JAM); 9.77	Asafa Powell (JAM); 9.99	Asafa Powell (JAM); 9.86
200 m	-	-	-	-	Tyson Gay (USA); 19.79	-
400 m	Jeremy Wariner (USA); 44.31	Jeremy Wariner (USA); 43.91	Jeremy Wariner (USA); 43.62	Jeremy Wariner (USA); 44.20	Jeremy Wariner (USA); 44.29	Jeremy Wariner (USA); 44.26
800 m	Mohammad Al-Azemi (KUW); 1:44.41	Wilfred Bungei (KEN); 1:42.69	Amine Laalou (MAR); 1:43.25	Mbulaeni Mulaudzi (RSA); 1:43.38	-	Mbulaeni Mulaudzi (RSA); 1:44.37
4 × 800 m relay	-	-	-	-	Kenya (KEN); 7:02.43	-
1500 m / 1 mile	Brimin Kiprop Kipruto (KEN); 3:36.53	Ivan Heshko (UKR); 3:31.08	Daniel Kipchirchir Komen (KEN); 3:29.02	Augustine Choge (KEN); 3:32.40	Mehdi Baala (FRA); 3:32.01	Augustine Choge (KEN); 3:32.48
1500 m / 1 mile	Alex Kipchirchir (KEN); 3:50.32	-	-	-	-	-
3000 m	-	-	-	-	-	Jesús España (ESP); 7:56.36
5000 m	Isaac Kiprono Songok (KEN); 12:55.79	Kenenisa Bekele (ETH); 12:51.44	Kenenisa Bekele (ETH); 12:50.18	Kenenisa Bekele (ETH); 12:48.25	Kenenisa Bekele (ETH); 12:48.09	Kenenisa Bekele (ETH); 12:57.74
10000 m	-	-	-	-	Micah Kogo (KEN); 26:35.63	-
3000 m steeplechase	-	Ezekiel Kemboi (KEN); 8:09.29	Paul Kipsiele Koech (KEN); 7:59.94	Saif Saaeed Shaheen (QAT); 7:56.54	Saif Saaeed Shaheen (QAT); 8:04.32	-
110 m hurdles	-	Terrence Trammell (USA); 13.06	Terrence Trammell (USA); 12.88	Allen Johnson (USA); 13.14	-	David Oliver (USA); 13.25
400 m hurdles	-	Alwyn Myburgh (USA); 48.46	Bershawn Jackson (USA); 47.86	Periklis Iakovakis (GRE); 47.92	-	-
Long jump	Irving Saladino (PAN); 8.53	Ignisious Gaisah (GHA); 8.31	Irving Saladino (PAN); 8.45	Irving Saladino (PAN); 8.36	Irving Saladino (PAN); 8.31	Irving Saladino (PAN); 8.35
Triple Jump	-	-	-	Christian Olsson (SWE); 17.39	-	-
Pole vault	-	-	Paul Burgess (AUS); 5.82	Brad Walker (USA); 5.85	-	Steven Hooker (AUS); 5.96
Shot Put	-	-	-	-	-	Reese Hoffa (USA); 21.14
Discus throw	Virgilijus Alekna (LTU); 68.39	-	-	Virgilijus Alekna (LTU); 68.51	-	-
Javelin throw	Andreas Thorkildsen (NOR); 91.59	Tero Pitkämäki (FIN); 89.07	Andreas Thorkildsen (NOR); 90.34	Tero Pitkämäki (FIN); 88.27	Andreas Thorkildsen (NOR); 86.97	Andreas Thorkildsen (NOR); 87.43

=== Women ===
Event	Bislett Games Oslo	Meeting Gaz de France Paris	Golden Gala Rome	Weltklasse Zürich	Memorial van Damme Brussels	ISTAF Berlin
100 m	Debbie Ferguson-McKenzie (BAH); 11.22	Sherone Simpson (JAM); 11.25	Sherone Simpson (JAM); 10.87	Sherone Simpson (JAM); 11.09	Sherone Simpson (JAM); 10.95	Sherone Simpson (JAM); 11.25
200 m	Kim Gevaert (BEL); 22.58	-	-	-	Kim Gevaert (BEL); 22.68	-
400 m	Sanya Richards (USA); 49.82	Sanya Richards (USA); 49.73	Sanya Richards (USA); 49.31	Sanya Richards (USA); 50.18	Sanya Richards (USA); 50.02	Sanya Richards (USA); 49.81
800 m	Janeth Jepkosgei (KEN); 2:00.51	-	Zulia Calatayud (CUB); 1:59.35	Olga Kotlyarova (RUS); 1:58.69	Hasna Benhassi (MAR); 1:59.06	-
1500 m	-	Yuliya Fomenko (RUS); 3:55.68	-	-	-	-
5000 m	Tirunesh Dibaba (ETH); 14:30.40	Tirunesh Dibaba (ETH); 14:54.30	Tirunesh Dibaba (ETH); 14:52.37	Tirunesh Dibaba (ETH); 14:45.73	Tirunesh Dibaba (ETH); 14:30.63	Meseret Defar (ETH); 14:25.43
100 m hurdles	Brigitte Foster-Hylton (JAM); 12.70	Susanna Kallur (SWE); 12.61	Susanna Kallur (SWE); 12.51	Michelle Perry (USA); 12.65	Michelle Perry (USA); 12.55	Ginnie Powell (USA); 12.65
400 m hurdles	-	Lashinda Demus (USA); 53.76	Lashinda Demus (USA); 53.51	-	-	-
High jump	Blanka Vlašić (CRO); 1.98	Yelena Slesarenko (RUS); 2.00	Blanka Vlašić (CRO); 2.00	Venelina Veneva (BUL); 2.04	Tia Hellebaut (BEL); 1.98	Tia Hellebaut (BEL); 2.00
Long Jump	Carolina Klüft (SWE); 6.67	-	-	-	-	-
Triple Jump	-	-	Tatyana Lebedeva (RUS); 14.88	-	-	Franka Dietzsch (GER); 54.36
Pole vault	-	-	Yelena Isinbaeva (RUS); 5.76	-	Yelena Isinbaeva (RUS); 4.81	-
Javelin throw	-	-	-	-	-	Barbora Špotáková (CZE); 64.30
Discus Throw	-	-	-	-	-	Franka Dietzsch (GER); 54.36
