= Lawrence Kemboi =

Kenyan steeplechase runner

Lawrence Kemboi Kipsang
Personal information
- Nationality: Kenyan
- Born: June 15, 1993 (age 33)
- Height: 170 cm (5 ft 7 in)
- Weight: 57 kg (126 lb)

Sport
- Sport: Athletics
- Event: 3000 metres steeplechase

Achievements and titles
- Personal best: 3000m SC: 8:11.26 (2019)

Lawrence Kemboi Kipsang (born 15 June 1993) is a Kenyan middle-distance runner specializing in the 3000 metres steeplechase. After a pro career that included a second-place finish at the 2013 Kenyan Athletics Championships, he was the pacemaker for Lamecha Girma's first steeplechase world record in 2023.

== Biography ==
As a junior, Kipsang won the steeplechase at the Kenya Prisons Championships in 2012 with a time of 8:38.4. The next year, he defended his Prisons Championships title and finished 2nd at the Kenyan Athletics Championships behind John Koech.

After competing on the Diamond League circuit regularly over the next several years, Kipsang was eventually hired as a pacemaker where he paced a majority of Diamond League steeplechase competitions in 2022. Most notably, Kipsang paced 3000 metres steeplechase world record set in 2023. He led the first 1000 metres in 2:36.35, pulling Lamecha Girma to a world record time of 7:54.10.

Kipsang is married to 2022 Kobe Marathon winner Sharon Kemboi, who he met in high school.

== Statistics ==
=== Personal bests ===
Event	Mark	Competition	Venue	Date
3000 metres steeplechase	8:11.26	IAAF World Challenge Nanjing	Nanjing, China	21 May 2019
3000 metres	8:01.43	Internationales Stadionfest	Berlin, Germany	3 September 2016
