= Meeting de Paris =

Athletics tournament held in Saint-Denis, France

- Date: June – August
- Location: Paris, France
- Event type: Track and field
- World Athletics Cat.: GW
- Established: 21 July 1999; 27 years ago
- Website: Diamond League – Paris
- 2026 Meeting de Paris

Meeting de Paris (formerly known as the Meeting Areva and Meeting Gaz de France) is an annual track and field meeting at the Stade Sébastien Charléty in Paris, France. Previously one of the IAAF Golden League events, it is now part of the Diamond League. It was first organized in 1999. The record attendance was set on 1 July 2005, with a total of 70,253 spectators.

== History ==
Stade De France, which hosted the Meeting de Paris from 1999 to 2016

The origins of the meet date back to 1984 when Michel Zilbermann organised an athletics meeting at the Stade Auguste Delaune. Another meeting in Paris was held annually in the Stade Sébastien Charléty. In the 1990s, the Saint-Denis meet was sponsored by the L'Humanité newspaper.

The two meets collaborated to create a new event in the Stade de France in 1999. Following this, the two meetings officially merged to become one meet in 2000. The meeting's founder Zilbermann died in April 2008 following a long illness.

The 2009 event was marred by heavy rain but Kenenisa Bekele, Kerron Stewart, Sanya Richards and Yelena Isinbayeva all remained on target for the 2009 Golden League jackpot. A particular highlight was Usain Bolt's 9.79 seconds run for the 100 m meet record, which was closely followed by a national-record-breaking Daniel Bailey. There were 46,500 people in attendance to see new French record holder Renaud Lavillenie win the pole vault competition. The 2013 event was headlined by Usain Bolt setting a World Leading time in the 200m in front of 50,226 fans. In 2017, the meeting moved back to Stade Sébastien Charléty. The 2020 edition was cancelled due to the COVID-19 pandemic.

== Editions ==
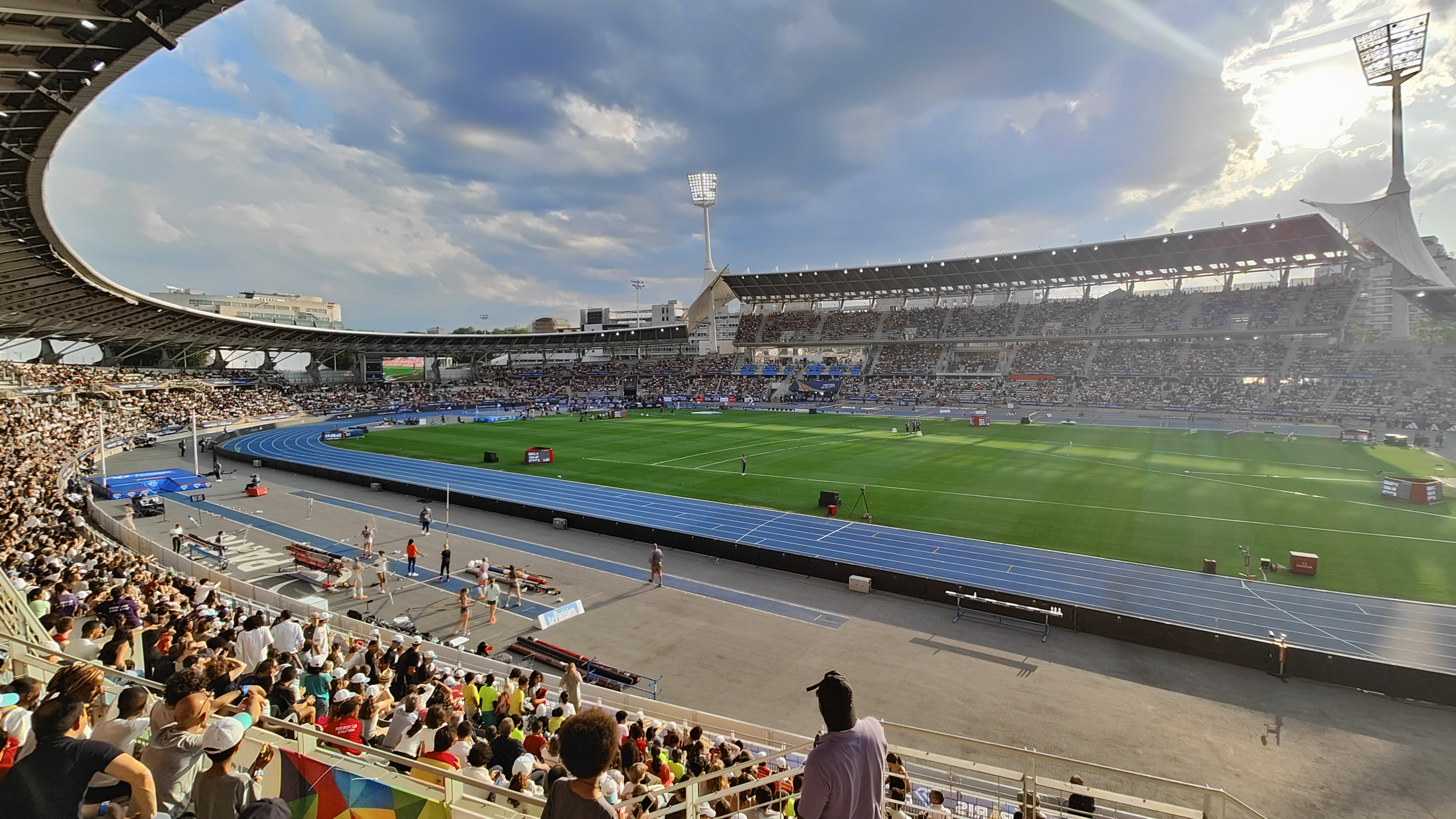
The 2023 meeting at the Charléty stadium

Meeting de Paris editions
Ed.	Meeting name	Series	Date	Ref.
1st	Meeting de Saint-Denis		2 Jun 1984	
2nd	Meeting de Paris		13 Jul 1985	
3rd	BNP de Paris		22 Jul 1986	
4th	Saint-Denis Invitational		11 Jun 1987	
5th	Saint-Denis Invitational		7 Jun 1988	
6th	Meeting International de Saint-Denis		23 Jun 1989	
7th	Meeting International de Saint-Denis		22 Jun 1990	
8th	Meeting International d'Athletisme		19 Jul 1991	
9th	Meeting International d'Athletisme		4 Jun 1992	
10th	International d'Athletisme de St Denis		11 Jun 1993	
...				
12th	1996 Meeting Gaz de France	1996 IAAF Grand Prix	28 Jun 1996	
13th	1997 Meeting Gaz de France	1997 IAAF Grand Prix	25 Jun 1997	
14th	1998 Meeting Gaz de France	1998 IAAF Grand Prix	29 Jul 1998	
	1999 Meeting Gaz de France Saint-Denis	1999 IAAF Grand Prix	3 Jul 1999	
15th	1999 Meeting de Paris	1999 IAAF Grand Prix	21 Jul 1999	
16th	2000 Meeting Gaz de France	2000 IAAF Golden League	23 Jun 2000	
17th	2001 Meeting Gaz de France	2001 IAAF Golden League	6 Jul 2001	
18th	2002 Meeting Gaz de France	2002 IAAF Golden League	5 Jul 2002	
19th	2003 Meeting Gaz de France	2003 IAAF Golden League	4 Jul 2003	
20th	2004 Meeting Gaz de France	2004 IAAF Golden League	23 Jul 2004	
21st	2005 Meeting Gaz de France	2005 IAAF Golden League	1 Jul 2005	
22nd	2006 Meeting Gaz de France	2006 IAAF Golden League	8 Jul 2006	
23rd	2007 Meeting Gaz de France	2007 IAAF Golden League	6 Jul 2007	
24th	2008 Meeting Gaz de France	2008 IAAF Golden League	18 Jul 2008	
25th	2009 Meeting Areva	2009 IAAF Golden League	17 Jul 2009	
26th	2010 Meeting Areva	2010 Diamond League	16 Jul 2010	
27th	2011 Meeting Areva	2011 Diamond League	8 Jul 2011	
28th	2012 Meeting Areva	2012 Diamond League	6 Jul 2012	
29th	2013 Meeting Areva	2013 Diamond League	6 Jul 2013	
30th	2014 Meeting Areva	2014 Diamond League	5 Jul 2014	
31st	2015 Meeting Areva	2015 Diamond League	4 Jul 2015	
32nd	2016 Meeting de Paris	2016 Diamond League	27 Aug 2016	
33rd	2017 Meeting de Paris	2017 Diamond League	1 Jul 2017	
34th	2018 Meeting de Paris	2018 Diamond League	30 Jun 2018	
35th	2019 Meeting de Paris	2019 Diamond League	24 Aug 2019	
2020: Meet canceled due to COVID-19
36th	2021 Meeting de Paris	2021 Diamond League	28 Aug 2021	
37th	2022 Meeting de Paris	2022 Diamond League	18 Jun 2022	
38th	2023 Meeting de Paris	2023 Diamond League	9 Jun 2023	
39th	2024 Meeting de Paris	2024 Diamond League	7 Jul 2024	
40th	2025 Meeting de Paris	2025 Diamond League	20 Jun 2025	
41st	2026 Meeting de Paris	2026 Diamond League	28 Jun 2026	

== World records ==
World records set at the Meeting de Paris
Year	Event	Record	Athlete	Nationality
2023	Two miles	7:54.10	Jakob Ingebrigtsen	Norway
2023	3000 m steeplechase	7:52.11	Lamecha Girma	Ethiopia
2023	5000 m	14:05.20	Faith Kipyegon	Kenya
2024	High Jump	2.10 m	Yaroslava Mahuchikh	Ukraine
2024	1500m	3:49.04	Faith Kipyegon	Kenya
2025	1500m	3:27.72 WU20R	Phanuel Koech	Kenya

== Meeting records ==
=== Men ===
Men's meeting records of the Meeting de Paris
Event	Record	Athlete	Nationality	Date	Meet	Ref.
100 m	9.79 (−0.2 m/s)	Usain Bolt	Jamaica	17 July 2009	2009	
200 m	19.65 (+0.2 m/s)	Noah Lyles	United States	24 August 2019	2019	
400 m	43.54	Collen Kebinatshipi	Botswana	28 June 2026	2026	
800 m	1:41.54	David Rudisha	Kenya	6 July 2012	2012	
1000 m	2:13.73	Noureddine Morceli	Algeria	2 July 1993		
1500 m	3:27.49	Azeddine Habz	France	20 June 2025	2025	
Mile	3:49.01	Hicham El Guerrouj	Morocco	29 July 1998	1998	
2000 m	4:58.21	Noureddine Morceli	Algeria	4 June 1992		
3000 m	7:24.00+ (Note: by World Athletics source; 7:23.8 by official Race Analysis)	Jakob Ingebrigtsen	Norway	9 June 2023	2023	
Two miles	7:54.10 WB	Jakob Ingebrigtsen	Norway	9 June 2023	2023	
5000 m	12:40.18	Kenenisa Bekele	Ethiopia	1 July 2005	2005	
10,000 m	27:22.95	Fernando Mamede	Portugal	9 July 1982		
110 m hurdles	12.88 (+0.5 m/s)	Dayron Robles	Cuba	18 July 2008	2008	
400 m hurdles	46.93	Rai Benjamin	United States	20 June 2025	2025	
3000 m steeplechase	7:52.11 WR	Lamecha Girma	Ethiopia	9 June 2023	2023	
High jump	2.40 m	Javier Sotomayor	Cuba	19 July 1991		
Pole vault	6.13 m	Armand Duplantis	Sweden	28 June 2026	2026	
Long jump	8.66 m (+0.9 m/s)	Mike Powell	United States	29 June 1990		
Triple jump	18.06 m (+0.4 m/s)	Will Claye	United States	24 August 2019	2019	
Shot put	22.44 m	Tomas Walsh	New Zealand	24 August 2019	2019	
Discus throw	70.21 m	Virgilijus Alekna	Lithuania	23 July 2004	2004	
Hammer throw	83.00 m	Balázs Kiss	Hungary	4 June 1998	1998	
Javelin throw	91.40 m	Jan Železný	Czech Republic	29 July 1998	1998	
4 × 100 m relay	38.22	Méba Mickaël Zeze; Jeff Erius; Ryan Zeze; Jimmy Vicaut	France	9 June 2023	2023	
4 × 200 m relay	1:21.73	Attila Kovács; László Babály; István Tatár; István Nagy	Hungary	9 July 1982		

=== Women ===
Women's meeting records of the Meeting de Paris
Event	Record	Athlete	Nationality	Date	Meet	Ref.
100 m	10.67 (+0.5 m/s)	Shelly-Ann Fraser-Pryce	Jamaica	18 June 2022	2022	
200 m	21.97 (+1.1 m/s)	Merlene Ottey	Jamaica	29 June 1990		
400 m	48.48 DLR	Marileidy Paulino	Dominican Republic	28 June 2026	2026	
800 m	1:53.80	Audrey Werro	Switzerland	28 June 2026	2026	
1000 m	2:32.40	Ella Kovács	Romania	2 July 1993		
1500 m	3:49.04	Faith Kipyegon	Kenya	7 July 2024	2024	
Mile	4:18.08	Mary Slaney	United States	9 July 1982		
3000 m	8:19.08	Francine Niyonsaba	Burundi	28 August 2021	2021	
5000 m	14:05.20	Faith Kipyegon	Kenya	9 June 2023	2023	
10,000 m	31:08.41	Catherina McKiernan	Ireland	17 June 1995		
100 m hurdles	12.21 (+0.7 m/s)	Grace Stark	United States	20 June 2025	2025	
400 m hurdles	53.06	Kim Batten	United States	29 July 1998	1998	
3000 m steeplechase	8:52.78	Ruth Jebet	Bahrain	27 August 2016	2016	
High jump	2.10 m WR	Yaroslava Mahuchikh	Ukraine	7 July 2024	2024	
Pole vault	4.91 m	Yelena Isinbayeva	Russia	6 July 2007	2007	
Long jump	7.15 m (+1.7 m/s)	Heike Drechsler	Germany	6 July 1992		
Triple jump	15.12 m (−0.9 m/s)	Tatyana Lebedeva	Russia	4 July 2003	2003	
Shot put	20.78 m	Valerie Adams	New Zealand	8 July 2011	2011	
Shot put	20.78 m X	Nadezhda Ostapchuk	Belarus	16 July 2010	2010	
Discus throw	69.04 m	Valarie Allman	United States	9 June 2023	2023	
Hammer throw	77.13 m	Brooke Andersen	United States	9 June 2023	2023	
Javelin throw	70.88 m (old design)	Petra Felke-Meier	East Germany	29 June 1990		
Javelin throw	68.01 m (current design)	Christina Obergföll	Germany	8 July 2011	2011	
4 × 100 m relay	42.99	Carmen Marco; Paula García; Paula Sevilla; Jaël Bestué	Spain	9 June 2023	2023	
4 × 200 m relay	1:32.17	Laurence Bily; Liliane Gaschet; Chantal Réga; Raymonde Naigre	France	9 July 1982		

=== Mixed ===
Mixed meeting records of the Meeting de Paris
Event	Record	Athletes	Nationality	Date	Meet	Ref.
4 × 100 m relay	40.99	Ylann Bizasene; Chloé Galet; Théo Schaub; Sarah Richard	France	28 June 2026	2026	
