= Judy Kiyeng =

Kenyan middle-distance runner

Personal information
- Nationality: Kenyan
- Born: 10 December 1993 (age 32)

Sport
- Sport: Middle-distance running
- Event: 1500 metres

Judy Kiyeng (born 10 December 1993) is a Kenyan middle-distance runner. She competed in the women's 1500 metres at the 2017 World Championships in Athletics.
