= Nicholas Kipkoech =

Kenyan runner (born 1992)

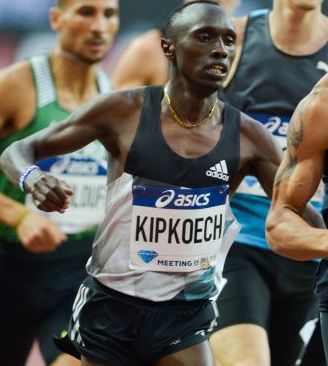
- Kipkoech at the 2016 Meeting de Paris

Personal information
- Full name: Nicholas Kiplangat Kipkoech
- Born: 22 October 1992 (age 33)

Sport
- Sport: Athletics
- Event: 800 metres

Achievements and titles
- Highest world ranking: 20 (800m)
- Personal bests: Outdoor; 800 m: 1:43.37 (Nairobi 2016); 1000 metres: 2:16.17 (Székesfehérvár 2018); 1500 metres: 3:44.07 (Bellinzona 2011); Indoor; 800 m: 1:46.34 (Toruń 2017); 1000 metres: 2:19.75 (Liévin 2020); 1500 metres: 3:48.56 (Mondeville 2017)
Medal record
Athletics
Representing Kenya}
World Youth Championships
Bronze medal – third place	2009 Brixen	800 m

Nicholas Kiplangat Kipkoech (born 22 October 1992) is a Kenyan middle-distance runner specialising in the 800 metres.
