= 2021 in the sport of athletics =

- Major world events: 2020 Olympic Games

In 2021, like the previous year, the sport of athletics was affected by the COVID-19 pandemic, at both the elite and local level. The main competition was the 2020 Tokyo Olympics, which had been rescheduled. The rescheduling meant that the World Athletics Championships, originally set for 2021, was postponed given the presence of the Olympics in a World Championships year.

Several other competitions were held in 2021 after being delayed from their usual schedule in 2020, including 2021 World Athletics U20 Championships. However, the severity of the impacts of the pandemic remained high and other major competitions were pushed to a later date (such as the 2021 World Athletics Indoor Championships and 2021 World Mountain and Trail Running Championships), while others were cancelled completely, including the African Championships in Athletics and Asian Athletics Championships.

Smaller-scale meetings generally proceeded where pandemic restrictions allowed, although continued restrictions resulted in the cancellation of the British Indoor Athletics Championships, USA Indoor Track and Field Championships, Tokyo Marathon, and both Chinese legs of the 2021 Diamond League.

== International competitions ==
=== Global championships ===
- Athletics at the 2020 Summer Olympics
- Athletics at the 2020 Summer Paralympics
- 2021 World Athletics Relays
- 2021 World Athletics U20 Championships

=== Regional championships ===
- 2021 Arab Athletics Championships
- 2021 Balkan Athletics Championships
- 2021 Balkan Indoor Athletics Championships
- 2021 Baltic States Athletics Championships
- 2021 Central American Championships in Athletics
- 2021 European Athletics Team Championships
- 2021 European Athletics Indoor Championships
- 2021 European Athletics U20 Championships
- 2021 European Athletics U23 Championships
- 2021 European Cross Country Championships
- 2021 European 10,000m Cup
- 2021 European Race Walking Team Championships
- 2021 European Throwing Cup
- 2021 World Para Athletics European Championships
- 2021 NACAC U18 U20 and U23 Championships in Athletics
- 2021 NACAC U23 Championships in Athletics – Results
- Athletics at the 2021 Junior Pan American Games
- 2021 Championships of the Small States of Europe
- 2021 South American Under-23 Championships in Athletics – Results
- 2021 South American Championships in Athletics
- 2021 South American Championships in Athletics – Results
- 2021 South American U18 Championships in Athletics
- 2021 South American U20 Championships in Athletics
- 2021 South American Under-23 Championships in Athletics

=== Postponed ===
- World Athletics Championships
- World Indoor Championships
- World Para Athletics Championships
- World Cross Country Championships
- World Mountain Running Championships
- World Long Distance Mountain Running Championships
- Universiade
- Southeast Asian Games
- South Asian Games
- Asian U18 Athletics Championships
- East Asian Youth Games
- European Youth Olympic Festival
- Pan American U20

=== Cancelled ===
- African Championships in Athletics
- Asian Athletics Championships
- CARIFTA Games
- Oceanian Athletics Championships
- Games of the Small States of Europe
- Island Games
- African U18 and U20 Championships in Athletics
- CARIFTA Games
- Oceania U20 Athletics Championships

== Annual competitions ==
- 2021 Diamond League
  - 2021 British Grand Prix
  - 2021 Doha Diamond League
  - 2021 Golden Gala
  - 2021 Bislett Games
  - 2021 BAUHAUS-galan
  - 2021 Herculis
  - 2021 Prefontaine Classic
  - 2021 Athletissima
  - 2021 Meeting de Paris
  - 2021 Memorial Van Damme
  - 2021 Weltklasse Zürich
- 2021 World Athletics Indoor Tour
- 2021 World Athletics Continental Tour
- 2021 Hypo-Meeting
- 2021 Berlin Marathon
- 2021 Boston Marathon
- 2021 Chicago Marathon
- 2021 London Marathon
- 2021 New York City Marathon
- 2021 Taipei Marathon

=== National indoor championships ===
- 2021 Belgian Indoor Athletics Championships
- 2021 Czech Indoor Athletics Championships
- 2021 Dutch Indoor Athletics Championships
- 2021 French Indoor Athletics Championships
- 2021 German Indoor Athletics Championships
- 2021 Italian Athletics Indoor Championships
- 2021 Polish Indoor Athletics Championships
- 2021 Russian Indoor Athletics Championships
- 2021 Spanish Indoor Athletics Championships
- 2021 Swedish Indoor Athletics Championships
- 2021 Turkish Indoor Athletics Championships
- 2021 Ukrainian Athletics Indoor Championships
- 2021 NCAA Division I Indoor Track and Field Championships

=== National outdoor championships ===
- 2020–21 Australian Athletics Championships
- 2021 Belgian Athletics Championships
- 2021 British Athletics Championships
  - 2021 British Athletics Marathon and 20km Walk Trial
- 2021 Canadian Athletics Championships
- 2021 Chinese Athletics Championships
- 2021 Czech Athletics Championships
- 2021 Dutch Athletics Championships
- 2021 Estonian Athletics Championships
- 2021 Finnish Athletics Championships
- 2021 French Athletics Championships
- 2021 German Athletics Championships
- 2021 Hungarian Athletics Championships
- 2021 Icelandic Athletics Championships
- 2021 Federation Cup Senior Athletics Championships
- 2021 Iranian Athletics Championships
- 2021 Italian Athletics Championships
- 2021 Jamaican Athletics Championships
- 2021 Japan Championships in Athletics
- 2021 Lithuanian Athletics Championships
- 2021 Norwegian Athletics Championships
- 2021 Polish Athletics Championships
- 2021 Portuguese Athletics Championships
- 2021 Russian Athletics Championships
- 2021 Spanish Athletics Championships
- 2021 Swedish Athletics Championships
- 2021 Ukrainian Athletics Championships
  - 2021 USA Cross Country Championships
  - 2020 United States Olympic trials
  - 2021 USATF U20 Outdoor Championships
  - 2021 NCAA Division I Outdoor Track and Field Championships
  - 2021 NCAA Division I Cross Country Championships
  - 2021 NCAA Division II Cross Country Championships

== By event ==
- 2020/21 in 60 metres
- 2021 in 100 metres

== World records ==
=== Indoor ===
| Event | Perf. | N | Athlete(s) | Nat. | Date | Meeting | Location | Ctry. | R |
|---|---|---|---|---|---|---|---|---|---|
| Men's triple jump | 18.07 m | i | Hugues Fabrice Zango | Burkina Faso | 16 January 2021 | | Aubière | FRA | . |
| Men's shot put | 22.82 m | i | Ryan Crouser | United States | 25 January 2021 | American Track League | Fayetteville | USA | |
| Women's 1500 metres | 3:53.09 | i | Gudaf Tsegay | Ethiopia | 9 February 2021 | Meeting Hauts-de-France Pas-de-Calais | Liévin | FRA | |
| Men's 60 m hurdles | 7.29 | | Grant Holloway | United States | 24 February 2021 | Meeting de Madrid | Madrid | ESP | |

=== Outdoor ===
| Event | Perf. | N | Athlete(s) | Nat. | Date | Meeting | Location | Ctry. | R |
|---|---|---|---|---|---|---|---|---|---|
| Women's 5 km (road) | 14:43 | Mx | Beatrice Chepkoech | Kenya | 14 February 2021 | 5 km Herculis | Fontvieille | MON | |
| Women's 20 km racewalk | 1:23:49 | | Jiayu Yang | China | 20 March 2021 | Chinese Winter Race Walking Championships | Huangshan | CHN | |
| Women's half marathon | 1:04.02 | Mx | Ruth Chepngetich | Kenya | 4 April 2024 | Istanbul Half Marathon | Istanbul | TUR | |
| Women's 50 km (road) | 2:59:54 | Mx | Desiree Linden | United States | 13 April 2021 | Brooks Running 50K and Marathon | Dorena Lake | USA | |
| Women's 10,000 m | 29:06.82 | | Sifan Hassan | Netherlands | 6 June 2021 | FBK Games | Hengelo | NED | |
| Women's 10,000 m | 29:01.03 | | Letesenbet Gidey | Ethiopia | 8 June 2021 | Ethiopian Trials | Hengelo | NED | |
| Men's shot put | 23.37 m | | Ryan Crouser | United States | 18 June 2021 | US Olympic Trials | Eugene | USA | |
| Women's 400 m hurdles | 51.90 | | Sydney McLaughlin | United States | 27 June 2021 | US Olympic Trials | Eugene | USA | |
| Men's 400 m hurdles | 46.70 | | Karsten Warholm | Norway | 1 July 2021 | Bislett Games | Oslo | NOR | |
| Women's triple jump | 15.67 m | +0.7 m/s | Yulimar Rojas | Venezuela | 1 August 2021 | Olympic Games | Tokyo | JPN | |
| Men's 400 m hurdles | 45.94 | | Karsten Warholm | Norway | 3 August 2021 | Olympic Games | Tokyo | JPN | |
| Women's 400 m hurdles | 51.46 | | Sydney McLaughlin | United States | 4 August 2021 | Olympic Games | Tokyo | JPN | |
| Women's half marathon | 1:03:44 | Mx | Yalemzerf Yehualaw | Ethiopia | 29 August 2021 | Antrim Coast Half Marathon | Larne | GBR | |
| Women's 5 km (road) | 14:29 | Wo | Senbere Teferi | Ethiopia | 12 September 2021 | Adizero: Road to Records | Herzogenaurach | GER | |
| Women's 10 km (road) | 30:01 | Wo | Agnes Tirop | Kenya | 12 September 2021 | Adizero: Road to Records | Herzogenaurach | GER | |
| Women's 10 km (road) | 29:38 | Mx | Kalkidan Gezahegne | Bahrain | 3 October 2021 | The Giants Geneva | Geneva | SUI | |
| Women's half marathon | 1:02:52 | Mx | Letesenbet Gidey | Ethiopia | 24 October 2021 | Valencia Half Marathon | Valencia | ESP | |
| Men's half marathon | 57:31 | | Jacob Kiplimo | Uganda | 21 November 2021 | EDP Meia Maratona de Lisboa | Lisbon | POR | |
| Men's 5 km (road) | 12:49 | | Berihu Aregawi | Ethiopia | 31 December 2021 | Cursa dels Nassos | Barcelona | ESP | |
| Women's 5 km (road) | 14:19 | Mx | Ejgayehu Taye | Ethiopia | 31 December 2021 | Cursa dels Nassos | Barcelona | ESP | |

== Deaths ==
- 5 January: Mikhail Zhelev, Bulgarian steeplechaser, aged 77.
- 7 January: Vladimir Kiselyov, Soviet shot putter, aged 64.
- 8 January: Bill Nankeville, British distance runner, aged 95.
- 13 January: Bernd Kannenberg, German racewalker, aged 78.
- 26 January: Margitta Gummel, German shot putter, aged 79.
- 31 January: Alejandro Gómez, Spanish marathon runner, aged 53.
- 7 February: Leslie Laing, Jamaican sprinter, aged 95.
- 8 February: Els Vader, Dutch sprinter, aged 61.
- 8 March: Josip Alebić, sprinter from Yugoslavia and Croatia, aged 74
- 14 March: Helena Fuchsová, runner from Czechoslovakia and Czechia, aged 55
- 8 April: Antal Kiss, Hungarian racewalker, aged 85
- 26 April: Tamara Press, shot putter from the Soviet Union and Ukraine, aged 84
- 13 May: Christa Stubnick, sprinter from Germany, aged 87
- 16 May: Alessandro Talotti, Italian jumper, aged 40
- 19 May: Lee Evans, sprinter from United States, aged 74
- 21 May: Manfred Ommer, sprinter from Germany, aged 70
- 22 May: Pavol Szikora, racewalker from Czechoslovakia and Slovakia, aged 69
- 22 May: Ron Hill, distance runner from England aged 82
- 30 May: Rick Mitchell, sprinter from Australia, aged 66
- 7 June: Jason Loutitt, distance runner Canada, aged 47
- 11 June: Paola Pigni, distance runner from Italy, aged 75
- 11 June: Surat Mathur, distance runner from India, aged 90
- 11 June: Sara Wedlund, distance runner from Sweden, aged 45
- 18 June: Emma Roca Rodríguez, Spanish distance runner, aged 47
- 18 June: Milkha Singh, India distance runner, aged 91
- 26 June: Abdalelah Haroun, sprinter from Sudan and Qatar, aged 24
- 28 June: Vera Nikolić, distance runner from Yugoslavia and Serbia, aged 72
- 30 June: Janet Moreau, sprinter from United States, aged 93
- 1 July: Josh Culbreath, American hurdler, aged 88
- 5 July: Aggrey Awori, sprinter and hurdler from Uganda, aged 82
- 5 July: Roberto Hernández, sprinter from Cuba, aged 54
- 8 July: Adrian Metcalfe, British sprinter, aged 79
- 18 July: Roger Quemener, French racewalker, aged 80
- 18 July: Nenad Stekić, long jumper from Yugoslavia and Serbia, aged 70
- 31 July: Angela Bailey, sprinter from Canada, aged 59
- 9 August: Cameron Burrell, American sprinter and long jumper, aged 26
- 12 August: Karl-Friedrich Haas, sprinter from Germany, aged 90
- 15 August: Rafael Romero, sprinter from Venezuela, aged 83
- 16 August: Volodymyr Holubnychy, racewalker from Soviet Union and Ukraine, aged 85
- 3 September: Barbara Inkpen, British jumper, aged 71
- 14 September: Yuriy Sedykh, hammer thrower from Soviet Union and Ukraine, aged 66
- 16 September: Margarita Ponomaryova, hurdler from Soviet Union and Russia, aged 58 ans
- 22 September: Jüri Tamm, hammer thrower from Soviet Union and Estonia, aged 64
- 29 September: Lee Vernon McNeill, sprinter from United States, aged 56
- 4 October: Valeriy Pidluzhny, long jumper from Soviet Union and Ukraine, aged 69
- 13 October: Agnes Tirop, distance runner from Kenya, aged 25
- 22 October: Álex Quiñónez, sprinter from Ecuador, aged 32 ans
- 28 October: Ali Baghbanbashi, distance runner from Iran, aged 97
- 3 November: Dorothy Manley, sprinter from Britain, aged 94
- 6 November: Luíz Antônio dos Santos, distance runner from Brazil, aged 57
- 7 November: Igor Nikulin, hammer thrower from Soviet Union and Russia, aged 61
- 17 November: Leonid Bartenyev, sprinter from Soviet Union and Ukraine, aged 88 ans
- 25 November: Julien Le Bas, sprinter from France, aged 97 ans
- 28 November: Emmit King, sprinter from United States, aged 62
- 29 November: C. J. Hunter, shot putter from United States, aged 52
- 3 December: Lamine Diack, administrator and former World Athletics President, aged 88
- 5 December: Sławomir Majusiak, distance runner from Poland, aged 57
- 8 December: Andrzej Zieliński, sprinter from Poland, aged 85
