= 2021 Meeting de Paris =

26th edition of the annual Meeting de Paris

- Dates: 28 August 2021
- Host city: Paris, France
- Venue: Stade Sébastien Charléty
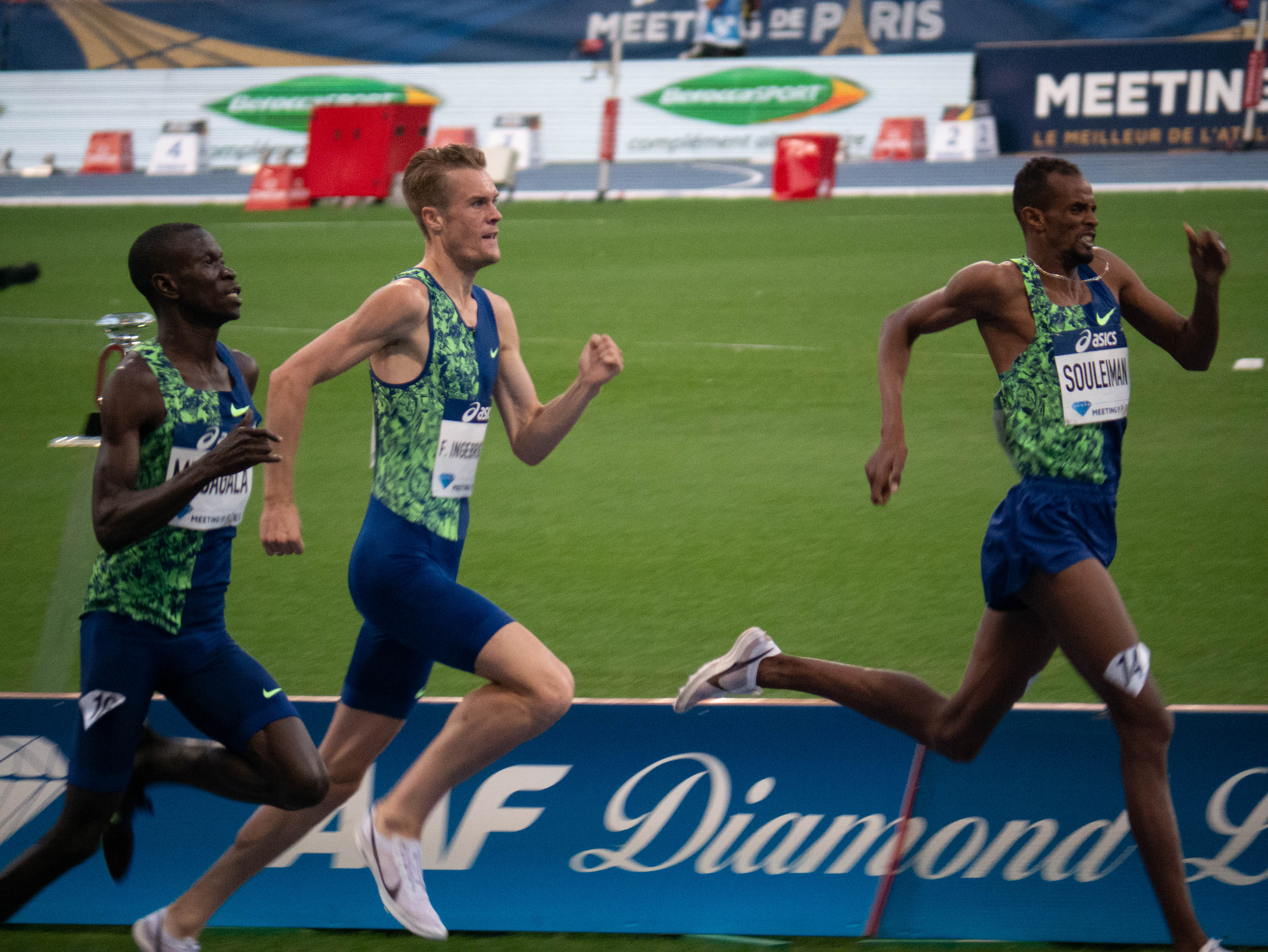
- Level: 2021 Diamond League
- Events: 13

The 2021 Meeting de Paris was the 26th edition of the annual outdoor track and field meeting in Paris, France. Held on 28 August at the Stade Sébastien Charléty, it was the tenth leg of the 2021 Diamond League – the highest level international track and field circuit. This was the second time the meeting was held on the stadium's renovated blue running track.

The meeting was highlighted by comeback wins from Olympic champions Armand Duplantis, Elaine Thompson-Herah and Hansle Parchment after losses in Lausanne earlier. Additionally, Francine Niyonsaba ran the #5 all-time mark in the 3000 metres of 8:19.08.

== Results ==
Athletes competing in the Diamond League disciplines earned extra compensation and points which went towards qualifying for the Diamond League finals in Zürich. First place earned 8 points, with each step down in place earning one less point than the previous, until no points are awarded in 9th place or lower.

The top-3 athletes in throwing and horizontal jumping events are ranked by the "Final 3" format, with their best mark overall in italics if it differs from their final trial.

=== Diamond Discipline ===
Men's 200m (+1.6 m/s)
Place	Athlete	Country	Time	Points
1st place, gold medalist(s)	Fred Kerley	United States	19.79	8
2nd place, silver medalist(s)	Kenny Bednarek	United States	19.79	7
3rd place, bronze medalist(s)	Aaron Brown	Canada	20.20	6
4	Yancarlos Martínez	Dominican Republic	20.22	5
5	Isaac Makwala	Botswana	20.26	4
6	Josephus Lyles	United States	20.37	3
7	Fausto Desalu	Italy	20.41	2
8	Mouhamadou Fall	France	20.46	1

Men's 800m
Place	Athlete	Country	Time	Points
1st place, gold medalist(s)	Wyclife Kinyamal	Kenya	1:43.94	8
2nd place, silver medalist(s)	Ferguson Rotich	Kenya	1:44.45	7
3rd place, bronze medalist(s)	Marco Arop	Canada	1:44.74	6
4	Peter Bol	Australia	1:44.88	5
5	Elliot Giles	Great Britain	1:44.92	4
6	Gabriel Tual	France	1:45.05	3
7	Amel Tuka	Bosnia and Herzegovina	1:45.37	2
8	Adrián Ben	Spain	1:45.40	1
9	Clayton Murphy	United States	1:45.60	
10	Patryk Dobek	Poland	1:48.37	
	Patryk Sieradzki	Poland	DNF	

Men's 110mH (+0.7 m/s)
Place	Athlete	Country	Time	Points
1st place, gold medalist(s)	Hansle Parchment	Jamaica	13.03	8
2nd place, silver medalist(s)	Devon Allen	United States	13.08	7
3rd place, bronze medalist(s)	Daniel Roberts	United States	13.16	6
4	Ronald Levy	Jamaica	13.24	5
5	Aurel Manga	France	13.40	4
6	Andrew Pozzi	Great Britain	13.49	3
7	Just Kwaou-Mathey	France	13.50	2
	Pascal Martinot-Lagarde	France	DQ	

Men's 3000mSC
Place	Athlete	Country	Time	Points
1st place, gold medalist(s)	Benjamin Kigen	Kenya	8:07.12	8
2nd place, silver medalist(s)	Abraham Kibiwot	Kenya	8:09.35	7
3rd place, bronze medalist(s)	Leonard Bett	Kenya	8:10.21	6
4	Getnet Wale	Ethiopia	8:13.31	5
5	Matthew Hughes	Canada	8:13.77	4
6	Yemane Haileselassie	Eritrea	8:15.24	3
7	Osama Zoghlami	Italy	8:17.24	2
8	Ahmed Abdelwahed	Italy	8:19.14	1
9	Hillary Bor	United States	8:21.02	
10	Abrham Sime	Ethiopia	8:23.35	
11	Mehdi Belhadj	France	8:34.29	
12	Abdelhamid Zerrifi	France	8:37.97	
13	Topi Raitanen	Finland	8:42.00	
14	Mohamed Tindouft	Morocco	8:46.82	
	Ala Zoghlami	Italy	DNF	
	Sebastián Martos	Spain	DNF	
	Conseslus Kipruto	Kenya	DNF	
	Fernando Carro	Spain	DNF	
	Soufiane El Bakkali	Morocco	DNF	

Men's Pole Vault
Place	Athlete	Country	Mark	Points
1st place, gold medalist(s)	Armand Duplantis	Sweden	6.01 m	8
2nd place, silver medalist(s)	EJ Obiena	Philippines	5.91 m	7
3rd place, bronze medalist(s)	Chris Nilsen	United States	5.81 m	6
4	Sam Kendricks	United States	5.73 m	5
5	KC Lightfoot	United States	5.73 m	4
6	Valentin Lavillenie	France	5.65 m	3
7	Piotr Lisek	Poland	5.55 m	2
8	Ethan Cormont	France	5.55 m	1
9	Kurtis Marschall	Australia	5.45 m	
10	Renaud Lavillenie	France	5.30 m	
	Harry Coppell	Great Britain	NM	

Men's Triple Jump
Place	Athlete	Country	Mark	Points
1st place, gold medalist(s)	Hugues Fabrice Zango	Burkina Faso	16.97 m (+1.7 m/s)	8
2nd place, silver medalist(s)	Yasser Triki	Algeria	16.71 m (+0.7 m/s) / 17.16 m (+1.7 m/s)	7
3rd place, bronze medalist(s)	Tiago Pereira	Portugal	NM / 16.66 m (+1.1 m/s)	6
4	Jean-Marc Pontvianne	France	16.62 m (+1.4 m/s)	5
5	Chris Benard	United States	16.61 m (+1.2 m/s)	4
6	Max Heß	Germany	16.56 m (−0.1 m/s)	3
7	Tobia Bocchi	Italy	16.53 m (+0.2 m/s)	2
8	Donald Scott	United States	16.44 m (+0.9 m/s)	1
9	Benjamin Compaoré	France	16.24 m (+1.7 m/s)	

Men's Javelin Throw
Place	Athlete	Country	Mark	Points
1st place, gold medalist(s)	Anderson Peters	Grenada	84.84 m / 85.98 m	8
2nd place, silver medalist(s)	Johannes Vetter	Germany	80.23 m / 87.20 m	7
3rd place, bronze medalist(s)	Andrian Mardare	Moldova	79.91 m / 85.43 m	6
4	Jakub Vadlejch	Czech Republic	85.17 m	5
5	Aliaksei Katkavets	Belarus	82.40 m	4
6	Vítězslav Veselý	Czech Republic	80.73 m	3
7	Julian Weber	Germany	80.40 m	2
8	Gatis Čakšs	Latvia	80.06 m	1
9	Teuraiterai Tupaia	France	77.91 m	
10	Pavel Mialeshka	Belarus	75.03 m	

Women's 100m (+1.3 m/s)
Place	Athlete	Country	Time	Points
1st place, gold medalist(s)	Elaine Thompson-Herah	Jamaica	10.72	8
2nd place, silver medalist(s)	Shericka Jackson	Jamaica	10.97	7
3rd place, bronze medalist(s)	Dina Asher-Smith	Great Britain	11.06	6
4	Natasha Morrison	Jamaica	11.09	5
5	Mujinga Kambundji	Switzerland	11.12	4
6	Daryll Neita	Great Britain	11.12	3
7	Ajla Del Ponte	Switzerland	11.12	2
8	Alexandra Burghardt	Germany	11.21	1

Women's 400m
Place	Athlete	Country	Time	Points
1st place, gold medalist(s)	Marileidy Paulino	Dominican Republic	50.12	8
2nd place, silver medalist(s)	Sada Williams	Barbados	50.30	7
3rd place, bronze medalist(s)	Allyson Felix	United States	50.47	6
4	Femke Bol	Netherlands	50.59	5
5	Quanera Hayes	United States	50.81	4
6	Natalia Kaczmarek	Poland	51.32	3
7	Candice McLeod	Jamaica	51.41	2
8	Amandine Brossier	France	52.79	1

Women's 3000m
Place	Athlete	Country	Time	Points
1st place, gold medalist(s)	Francine Niyonsaba	Burundi	8:19.08	8
2nd place, silver medalist(s)	Ejgayehu Taye	Ethiopia	8:19.52	7
3rd place, bronze medalist(s)	Margaret Kipkemboi	Kenya	8:21.53	6
4	Elise Cranny	United States	8:30.30	5
5	Fantu Worku	Ethiopia	8:30.76	4
6	Eilish McColgan	Great Britain	8:31.36	3
7	Karoline Bjerkeli Grøvdal	Norway	8:33.47	2
8	Konstanze Klosterhalfen	Germany	8:36.70	1
9	Alicia Monson	United States	8:40.08	
10	Gabriela DeBues-Stafford	Canada	8:44.21	
11	Beatrice Chebet	Kenya	8:44.27	
12	Hanna Klein	Germany	8:46.01	
13	Nadia Battocletti	Italy	8:58.12	
	Esther Guerrero	Spain	DNF	
	Kate Van Buskirk	Canada	DNF	

Women's 100mH (+1.7 m/s)
Place	Athlete	Country	Time	Points
1st place, gold medalist(s)	Danielle Williams	Jamaica	12.50	8
2nd place, silver medalist(s)	Nadine Visser	Netherlands	12.58	7
3rd place, bronze medalist(s)	Megan Tapper	Jamaica	12.66	6
4	Tobi Amusan	Nigeria	12.69	5
5	Gabbi Cunningham	United States	12.86	4
6	Christina Clemons	United States	12.96	3

Women's 400mH
Place	Athlete	Country	Time	Points
1st place, gold medalist(s)	Gianna Woodruff	Panama	54.44	8
2nd place, silver medalist(s)	Anna Ryzhykova	Ukraine	54.59	7
3rd place, bronze medalist(s)	Janieve Russell	Jamaica	54.75	6
4	Nnenya Hailey	United States	54.78	5
5	Viktoriya Tkachuk	Ukraine	54.93	4
6	Emma Zapletalová	Slovakia	55.61	3
7	Paulien Couckuyt	Belgium	56.36	2
8	Shamier Little	United States	57.18	1

Women's High Jump
Place	Athlete	Country	Mark	Points
1st place, gold medalist(s)	Nicola Olyslagers	Australia	1.98 m	8
2nd place, silver medalist(s)	Mariya Lasitskene	Authorised Neutral Athletes	1.98 m	7
3rd place, bronze medalist(s)	Iryna Herashchenko	Ukraine	1.95 m	6
4	Eleanor Patterson	Australia	1.95 m	5
5	Yaroslava Mahuchikh	Ukraine	1.95 m	4
6	Kamila Lićwinko	Poland	1.92 m	3
7	Elena Vallortigara	Italy	1.92 m	2
8	Laureen Maxwell	France	1.89 m	1
9	Yuliya Levchenko	Ukraine	1.89 m	
10	Solène Gicquel	France	1.89 m	
11	Inika McPherson	United States	1.81 m	

Women's Discus Throw
Place	Athlete	Country	Mark	Points
1st place, gold medalist(s)	Sandra Perković	Croatia	65.68 m / 66.08 m	8
2nd place, silver medalist(s)	Yaime Pérez	Cuba	65.31 m	7
3rd place, bronze medalist(s)	Valarie Allman	United States	64.51 m	6
4	Liliana Cá	Portugal	62.43 m	5
5	Mélina Robert-Michon	France	62.42 m	4
6	Denia Caballero	Cuba	61.95 m	3
7	Kristin Pudenz	Germany	61.78 m	2
8	Claudine Vita	Germany	58.09 m	1
9	Marike Steinacker	Germany	54.24 m	

=== National Events ===
Men's 100m (+0.7 m/s)
Place	Athlete	Country	Time
1st place, gold medalist(s)	Marvin Bracy	United States	10.04
2nd place, silver medalist(s)	Nigel Ellis	Jamaica	10.14
3rd place, bronze medalist(s)	Arthur Cissé	Ivory Coast	10.17
4	Jimmy Vicaut	France	10.19
5	Julian Forte	Jamaica	10.21
6	Méba-Mickaël Zeze	France	10.22
7	Cejhae Greene	Antigua and Barbuda	10.26
	Amaury Golitin	France	DQ

=== Regional Races ===
Men's 100m (+0.6 m/s)
Place	Athlete	Country	Time
1st place, gold medalist(s)	Mouhamadou Fall	France	10.14
2nd place, silver medalist(s)	Méba-Mickaël Zeze	France	10.15
3rd place, bronze medalist(s)	Jerry Leconte	France	10.54
4	Johnson Casseus	France	10.98
5	Jonathan Gelie	France	11.01
6	Ibrahim Diallo	France	11.10
	Amaury Golitin	France	DQ

Men's 400m
Place	Athlete	Country	Time
1st place, gold medalist(s)	Julien Watrin	Belgium	46.56
2nd place, silver medalist(s)	Yanis Meziane	France	47.60
3rd place, bronze medalist(s)	Miloud Laredj	Algeria	47.84
4	Romain Debes	France	49.45

Men's 1000m
Place	Athlete	Country	Time
1st place, gold medalist(s)	Clément Dhainaut	France	2:22.00
2nd place, silver medalist(s)	Paul Anselmini	France	2:22.32
3rd place, bronze medalist(s)	Cyril Meersseman	France	2:24.05
4	Mickael Yeye	France	2:26.31
5	Nelson Dakouri	France	2:29.94
6	Ismail Mezzour	Morocco	2:35.88

Women's 100m (±0.0 m/s)
Place	Athlete	Country	Time
1st place, gold medalist(s)	Maroussia Paré	France	11.79
2nd place, silver medalist(s)	Paméra Losange	France	11.79
3rd place, bronze medalist(s)	Shana Lambourde	France	12.15

Women's 400m
Place	Athlete	Country	Time
1st place, gold medalist(s)	Rachel Pellaud	Switzerland	53.29
2nd place, silver medalist(s)	Bérénice Cleyet-Merle	France	59.35
