= 2021 Doha Diamond League =

- Dates: 28 May 2021
- Host city: Doha, Qatar
- Venue: Suheim bin Hamad Stadium
- Level: 2021 Diamond League
- Events: 19 (14 Diamond League)

The 2021 Doha Diamond League was the 23rd edition of the annual outdoor track and field meeting in Doha, Qatar. Held on 28 May at the Suheim bin Hamad Stadium, it was the second leg of the 2021 Diamond League – the highest level international track and field circuit.

The meeting was highlighted by Faith Kipyegon's 1:58.26 victory in the 800 metres, done in an unusual negative split of 60.8 seconds for the first lap followed by 57.4 seconds for the final lap.

== Results ==
Athletes competing in the Diamond League disciplines earned extra compensation and points which went towards qualifying for the Diamond League finals in Zürich. First place earned 8 points, with each step down in place earning one less point than the previous, until no points are awarded in 9th place or lower.

The top-3 athletes in throwing and horizontal jumping events are ranked by the "Final 3" format, with their best mark overall in italics if it differs from their final trial.

=== Diamond Discipline ===
Men's 200m (+0.4 m/s)
Place	Athlete	Country	Time	Points
1st place, gold medalist(s)	Kenny Bednarek	United States	19.88	8
2nd place, silver medalist(s)	Andre De Grasse	Canada	19.89	7
3rd place, bronze medalist(s)	Aaron Brown	Canada	20.25	6
4	Emmanuel Matadi	Liberia	20.45	5
5	Justin Gatlin	United States	20.49	4
6	Adam Gemili	Great Britain	20.58	3
7	Arthur Cissé	Ivory Coast	20.91	2
8	Ramil Guliyev	Turkey	21.09	1

Men's 400m
Place	Athlete	Country	Time	Points
1st place, gold medalist(s)	Michael Norman	United States	44.27	8
2nd place, silver medalist(s)	Anthony Zambrano	Colombia	44.57	7
3rd place, bronze medalist(s)	Fred Kerley	United States	44.60	6
4	Kirani James	Grenada	44.61	5
5	Vernon Norwood	United States	44.87	4
6	Mazen Al-Yassin	Saudi Arabia	45.78	3
7	Ammar Ismail Yahia Ibrahim	Qatar	46.10	2
8	Kevin Borlée	Belgium	46.29	1

Men's 800m
Place	Athlete	Country	Time	Points
1st place, gold medalist(s)	Wyclife Kinyamal	Kenya	1:43.91	8
2nd place, silver medalist(s)	Ferguson Rotich	Kenya	1:44.45	7
3rd place, bronze medalist(s)	Daniel Rowden	Great Britain	1:44.60	6
4	Amel Tuka	Bosnia and Herzegovina	1:44.76	5
5	Adrián Ben	Spain	1:45.10	4
6	Tshepo Tshite	South Africa	1:45.54	3
7	Jamal Hairane	Qatar	1:45.87	2
8	Abdirahman Saeed Hassan	Qatar	1:45.99	1
9	Jamie Webb	Great Britain	1:48.60	
	Cornelius Tuwei	Kenya	DNF	

Men's 1500m
Place	Athlete	Country	Time	Points
1st place, gold medalist(s)	Timothy Cheruiyot	Kenya	3:30.48	8
2nd place, silver medalist(s)	Stewart McSweyn	Australia	3:31.57	7
3rd place, bronze medalist(s)	Soufiane El Bakkali	Morocco	3:31.95	6
4	Samuel Tefera	Ethiopia	3:32.52	5
5	Bethwell Birgen	Kenya	3:33.64	4
6	Ronald Musagala	Uganda	3:35.99	3
7	Vincent Kibet	Kenya	3:36.15	2
8	Mohamad Al-Garni	Qatar	3:36.75	1
9	Musab Adam Ali	Qatar	3:36.96	
10	Kalle Berglund	Sweden	3:37.92	
11	Hamza Driouch	Qatar	3:39.89	
12	Matthew Ramsden	Australia	3:40.89	
13	Ryan Gregson	Australia	3:42.93	
	Timothy Sein	Kenya	DNF	
	Erik Sowinski	United States	DNF	

Men's 400mH
Place	Athlete	Country	Time	Points
1st place, gold medalist(s)	Rai Benjamin	United States	47.38	8
2nd place, silver medalist(s)	Alison dos Santos	Brazil	47.57	7
3rd place, bronze medalist(s)	Kyron McMaster	British Virgin Islands	47.82	6
4	Abderrahman Samba	Qatar	48.26	5
5	Kenny Selmon	United States	49.03	4
6	Yasmani Copello	Turkey	49.11	3
7	Thomas Barr	Ireland	49.91	2
8	David Kendziera	United States	50.39	1

Men's High Jump
Place	Athlete	Country	Mark	Points
1st place, gold medalist(s)	Ilya Ivanyuk	Authorised Neutral Athletes	2.33 m	8
2nd place, silver medalist(s)	Mutaz Essa Barshim	Qatar	2.30 m	7
3rd place, bronze medalist(s)	Andriy Protsenko	Ukraine	2.27 m	6
4	Brandon Starc	Australia	2.27 m	5
5	Derek Drouin	Canada	2.24 m	4
6	Jamal Wilson	Bahamas	2.24 m	3
7	Maksim Nedasekau	Belarus	2.24 m	2
8	Donald Thomas	Bahamas	2.20 m	1
9	Trey Culver	United States	2.15 m	
10	Hamdi Ali	Qatar	2.15 m	

Men's Shot Put
Place	Athlete	Country	Mark	Points
1st place, gold medalist(s)	Tom Walsh	New Zealand	21.63 m	8
2nd place, silver medalist(s)	Filip Mihaljević	Croatia	20.89 m / 21.57 m	7
3rd place, bronze medalist(s)	Armin Sinančević	Serbia	NM / 21.88 m	6
4	Mostafa Amr Hassan	Egypt	21.12 m	5
5	Zane Weir	Italy	20.26 m	4
6	Mesud Pezer	Bosnia and Herzegovina	20.01 m	3
7	Konrad Bukowiecki	Poland	19.92 m	2
8	Franck Elemba	Congo	18.80 m	1

Women's 100m (+1.1 m/s)
Place	Athlete	Country	Time	Points
1st place, gold medalist(s)	Shelly-Ann Fraser-Pryce	Jamaica	10.84	8
2nd place, silver medalist(s)	Blessing Okagbare	Nigeria	10.90	7
3rd place, bronze medalist(s)	Javianne Oliver	United States	11.03	6
4	Marie-Josée Ta Lou	Ivory Coast	11.12	5
5	Hannah Cunliffe	United States	11.22	4
6	Kiara Parker	United States	11.26	3
7	Ajla Del Ponte	Switzerland	11.36	2
8	Mudhawi Al-Shammari	Kuwait	11.88	1

Women's 800m
Place	Athlete	Country	Time	Points
1st place, gold medalist(s)	Faith Kipyegon	Kenya	1:58.26	8
2nd place, silver medalist(s)	Natoya Goule	Jamaica	1:59.70	7
3rd place, bronze medalist(s)	Rababe Arafi	Morocco	1:59.83	6
4	Habitam Alemu	Ethiopia	2:00.02	5
5	Keely Hodgkinson	Great Britain	2:00.63	4
6	Winnie Nanyondo	Uganda	2:01.76	3
7	Hedda Hynne	Norway	2:02.47	2
8	Hanna Green	United States	2:02.71	1
	Noélie Yarigo	Benin	DNF	

Women's 3000m
Place	Athlete	Country	Time	Points
1st place, gold medalist(s)	Beatrice Chebet	Kenya	8:27.49	8
2nd place, silver medalist(s)	Margaret Kipkemboi	Kenya	8:28.27	7
3rd place, bronze medalist(s)	Lilian Kasait Rengeruk	Kenya	8:28.96	6
4	Hellen Obiri	Kenya	8:33.98	5
5	Sheila Chelangat	Kenya	8:36.20	4
6	Yasemin Can	Turkey	8:39.47	3
7	Hawi Feysa	Ethiopia	8:39.88	2
8	Eva Cherono	Kenya	8:43.67	1
9	Dominique Scott-Efurd	South Africa	8:51.39	
10	Camille Buscomb	New Zealand	8:58.10	
11	Siham Hilali	Morocco	9:03.87	
	Winny Chebet	Kenya	DNF	

Women's 3000mSC
Place	Athlete	Country	Time	Points
1st place, gold medalist(s)	Norah Jeruto	Kenya	9:00.67	8
2nd place, silver medalist(s)	Mekides Abebe	Ethiopia	9:02.52	7
3rd place, bronze medalist(s)	Winfred Yavi	Bahrain	9:02.64	6
4	Hyvin Jepkemoi	Kenya	9:07.58	5
5	Emma Coburn	United States	9:08.22	4
6	Maruša Mišmaš-Zrimšek	Slovenia	9:16.82	3
7	Gesa Felicitas Krause	Germany	9:16.89	2
8	Peruth Chemutai	Uganda	9:22.09	1
9	Rosefline Chepngetich	Kenya	9:30.80	
10	Marwa Bouzayani	Tunisia	9:32.74	
11	Luiza Gega	Albania	9:34.20	
12	Genevieve Gregson	Australia	9:35.27	
13	Lili Anna Vindics-Tóth	Hungary	9:47.48	
	Fancy Cherono	Kenya	DNF	

Women's Pole Vault
Place	Athlete	Country	Mark	Points
1st place, gold medalist(s)	Katie Moon	United States	4.84 m	8
2nd place, silver medalist(s)	Sandi Morris	United States	4.84 m	7
3rd place, bronze medalist(s)	Holly Bradshaw	Great Britain	4.74 m	6
4	Tina Šutej	Slovenia	4.74 m	5
5	Katerina Stefanidi	Greece	4.74 m	4
6	Iryna Zhuk	Belarus	4.74 m	3
7	Anzhelika Sidorova	Authorised Neutral Athletes	4.64 m	2
8	Angelica Bengtsson	Sweden	4.50 m	1
	Alysha Newman	Canada	NM	

Women's Triple Jump
Place	Athlete	Country	Mark	Points
1st place, gold medalist(s)	Yulimar Rojas	Venezuela	15.11 m (+0.8 m/s) / 15.15 m (+2.0 m/s)	8
2nd place, silver medalist(s)	Kimberly Williams	Jamaica	14.45 m (+0.9 m/s) / 14.69 m (+1.6 m/s)	7
3rd place, bronze medalist(s)	Shanieka Ricketts	Jamaica	NM/ 14.98 m (+1.2 m/s)	6
4	Thea LaFond	Dominica	14.57 m (+2.4 m/s)	5
5	Keturah Orji	United States	14.37 m (+1.9 m/s)	4
6	Olha Saladukha	Ukraine	14.04 m (+2.2 m/s)	3
7	Parinya Chuaimaroeng	Thailand	13.98 m (+1.8 m/s)	2
8	Caterine Ibargüen	Colombia	13.86 m (+1.3 m/s)	1
9	Paraskevi Papachristou	Greece	13.83 m (+1.6 m/s)	
10	Olga Rypakova	Kazakhstan	13.58 m (+0.9 m/s)	
Best wind-legal performances
—	Thea LaFond	Dominica	14.18 m (+0.9 m/s)	
—	Olha Saladukha	Ukraine	13.92 m (+1.5 m/s)	

Women's Discus Throw
Place	Athlete	Country	Mark	Points
1st place, gold medalist(s)	Yaime Pérez	Cuba	61.35 m / 63.75 m	8
2nd place, silver medalist(s)	Valarie Allman	United States	58.58 m / 65.57 m	7
3rd place, bronze medalist(s)	Sandra Perković	Croatia	NM/ 63.60 m	6
4	Claudine Vita	Germany	63.06 m	5
5	Denia Caballero	Cuba	63.00 m	4
6	Marija Tolj	Croatia	60.76 m	3
7	Subenrat Insaeng	Thailand	58.33 m	2
8	Nadine Müller	Germany	57.83 m	1
9	Whitney Ashley	United States	53.21 m	

=== National Events ===
Men's 100m (+0.9 m/s)
Place	Athlete	Country	Time
1st place, gold medalist(s)	Femi Ogunode	Qatar	10.00
2nd place, silver medalist(s)	Mahamat Goubaye Youssouf	Chad	10.26
3rd place, bronze medalist(s)	Owaab Barrow	Qatar	10.46
4	Mahmoud Hafiz Ibrahim	Saudi Arabia	10.48
5	Kayhan Özer	Turkey	10.48
6	Mahamat Zakaria Khalid	Qatar	10.59
7	Saeed Othman Alabsi	Qatar	10.60
8	Tosin Ogunode	Qatar	10.72

Men's 400m
Place	Athlete	Country	Time
1st place, gold medalist(s)	Kennedy Luchembe	Zambia	46.29
2nd place, silver medalist(s)	Mohamed Fares Jelassi	Tunisia	46.73
3rd place, bronze medalist(s)	Rami Balti	Tunisia	47.03
4	Hussein Ibrahim Issaka	Qatar	48.10
5	Ibrahim Mohammed Futayni	Saudi Arabia	48.33
6	Mohamed Moussa Abdulrahman	Qatar	48.84
7	Abdelmadjid Mahamat Mahadjir	Qatar	48.91

Men's 800m
Place	Athlete	Country	Time
1st place, gold medalist(s)	Mohamed Ali Gouaned	Algeria	1:45.47
2nd place, silver medalist(s)	Mouad Zahafi	Morocco	1:46.65
3rd place, bronze medalist(s)	Musaeb Abdulrahman Balla	Qatar	1:47.09
4	Abdessalem Ayouni	Tunisia	1:47.18
5	Manuel Olmedo	Spain	1:47.34
6	Erik Sowinski	United States	1:47.40
7	Rabi Mohamoud Mubarak	Qatar	1:47.56
8	Ebrahim Al-Zofairi	Kuwait	1:47.57
9	El Hafez Mahadi	Qatar	1:50.73
10	Khaled Mohamed Jaman al Harbi	Kuwait	1:53.80
	Khalid Benmahdi	Algeria	DNF
	Riadh Chninni	Tunisia	DNF
	Mostafa Smaili	Morocco	DNF

Men's 400mH
Place	Athlete	Country	Time
1st place, gold medalist(s)	Ashrat Hussen Osman	Qatar	49.58
2nd place, silver medalist(s)	Mohamed Shaib	Sudan	51.16
3rd place, bronze medalist(s)	Amar Ebed Ebed	Qatar	51.40
4	Mohamed Amine Touati	Tunisia	52.11
5	Muhand Khamis Saifeldin	Qatar	53.06
	Ismail Doudai Abakar	Qatar	DNS
	Mehdi Pirjahan	Iran	DNF

Men's 3000mSC
Place	Athlete	Country	Time
1st place, gold medalist(s)	Moses Kibet Kipsang	Kenya	8:30.01
2nd place, silver medalist(s)	Yaser Bagharab	Qatar	8:35.36
3rd place, bronze medalist(s)	Albert Chemutai	Uganda	8:41.42
4	Hicham Sigueni	Morocco	8:55.12
	Abdelkarim Ben Zahra	Morocco	DNF
	Abdelaziz Merzougui	Spain	DNF
	Tadese Takele	Ethiopia	DNS
	Mohamed Tindouft	Morocco	DNS

== See also ==
- 2021 Weltklasse Zürich (Diamond League final)
