= 2021 Herculis =

- Dates: 9 July 2021
- Host city: Monaco
- Venue: Stade Louis II
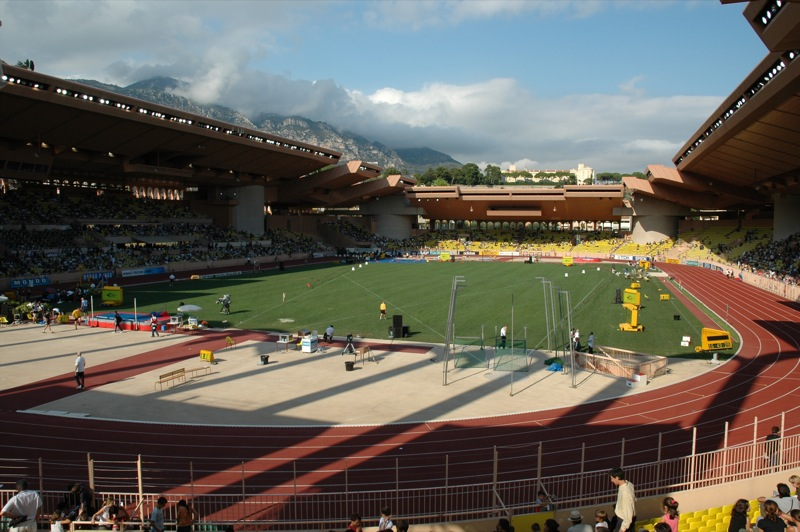
- Level: 2021 Diamond League

The 2021 Herculis was the 35th edition of the annual outdoor track and field meeting in Monaco. Held on 9 July at Stade Louis II, it was the sixth leg of the 2021 Diamond League – the highest level international track and field circuit.

On the women's side, the meeting was highlighted by Faith Kipyegon running 3:51.07 to beat Sifan Hassan and scare the world record. In the men's 3000 m steeplechase, the final lap warning bell was rung one lap early by race officials. This led Benjamin Kigen to start his final sprint early, thinking he only had 400 metres left to run when actually 800 metres remained. Upon learning of his mistake, Kigen slowed to a jog, allowing Lamecha Girma to pass and win the race.

== Results ==
Athletes competing in the Diamond League disciplines earned extra compensation and points which went towards qualifying the Diamond League finals in Zürich. First place earned 8 points, with each step down in place earning one less point than the previous, until no points are awarded in 9th place or lower.

The top-3 athletes in throwing and horizontal jumping events are ranked by the "Final 3" format, with their best mark overall in italics if it differs from their final trial.

=== Diamond Discipline ===
Men's 100m (+0.3 m/s)
Place	Athlete	Country	Time	Points
1st place, gold medalist(s)	Ronnie Baker	United States	9.91	8
2nd place, silver medalist(s)	Akani Simbine	South Africa	9.98	7
3rd place, bronze medalist(s)	Marcell Jacobs	Italy	9.99	6
4	Andre De Grasse	Canada	10.00	5
5	Trayvon Bromell	United States	10.01	4
6	Fred Kerley	United States	10.15	3
7	Filippo Tortu	Italy	10.17	2
	Jimmy Vicaut	France	DQ	

Men's 800m
Place	Athlete	Country	Time	Points
1st place, gold medalist(s)	Nijel Amos	Botswana	1:42.91	8
2nd place, silver medalist(s)	Emmanuel Korir	Kenya	1:43.04	7
3rd place, bronze medalist(s)	Marco Arop	Canada	1:43.26	6
4	Ferguson Rotich	Kenya	1:43.57	5
5	Elliot Giles	Great Britain	1:44.07	4
6	Patryk Dobek	Poland	1:44.28	3
7	Clayton Murphy	United States	1:44.41	2
8	Amel Tuka	Bosnia and Herzegovina	1:44.85	1
9	Gabriel Tual	France	1:45.08	
10	Benjamin Robert	France	1:46.75	
11	Bryce Hoppel	United States	1:47.74	
	Patryk Sieradzki	Poland	DNF	

Men's 1500m
Place	Athlete	Country	Time	Points
1st place, gold medalist(s)	Timothy Cheruiyot	Kenya	3:28.28	8
2nd place, silver medalist(s)	Mohamed Katir	Spain	3:28.76	7
3rd place, bronze medalist(s)	Jakob Ingebrigtsen	Norway	3:29.25	6
4	Stewart McSweyn	Australia	3:29.51	5
5	Charles Simotwo	Kenya	3:30.30	4
6	Marcin Lewandowski	Poland	3:30.42	3
7	Samuel Tefera	Ethiopia	3:30.71	2
8	Azeddine Habz	France	3:31.74	1
9	Melese Nberet	Ethiopia	3:31.82	
10	Filip Ingebrigtsen	Norway	3:32.23	
11	Baptiste Mischler	France	3:32.42	
12	Jye Edwards	Australia	3:33.23	
13	Musab Adam Ali	Qatar	3:35.57	
	Erik Sowinski	United States	DNF	
	Timothy Sein	Kenya	DNF	

Men's 400mH
Place	Athlete	Country	Time	Points
1st place, gold medalist(s)	Karsten Warholm	Norway	47.08	8
2nd place, silver medalist(s)	Alison dos Santos	Brazil	47.51	7
3rd place, bronze medalist(s)	Rasmus Mägi	Estonia	48.83	6
4	Constantin Preis	Germany	49.49	5
5	Wilfried Happio	France	49.66	4
6	Chris McAlister	Great Britain	49.98	3
	Aldrich Bailey	United States	DNF	

Men's 3000mSC
Place	Athlete	Country	Time	Points
1st place, gold medalist(s)	Lamecha Girma	Ethiopia	8:07.75	8
2nd place, silver medalist(s)	Abraham Kibiwot	Kenya	8:07.81	7
3rd place, bronze medalist(s)	Djilali Bedrani	France	8:11.17	6
4	Mehdi Belhadj	France	8:12.43	5
5	Hillary Bor	United States	8:14.69	4
6	Ahmed Abdelwahed	Italy	8:14.86	3
7	Benjamin Kigen	Kenya	8:15.09	2
8	Tadese Takele	Ethiopia	8:15.12	1
9	Benard Keter	United States	8:18.53	
10	Alexis Phelut	France	8:20.51	
11	Daniel Arce	Spain	8:20.91	
12	Mark Pearce	Great Britain	8:34.03	
	Amos Kirui	Kenya	DNF	

Men's High Jump
Place	Athlete	Country	Mark	Points
1st place, gold medalist(s)	Mikhail Akimenko	Authorised Neutral Athletes	2.32 m	8
2nd place, silver medalist(s)	Django Lovett	Canada	2.29 m	7
3rd place, bronze medalist(s)	Maksim Nedasekau	Belarus	2.25 m	6
4	Andriy Protsenko	Ukraine	2.25 m	5
5	Ilya Ivanyuk	Authorised Neutral Athletes	2.25 m	4
6	Brandon Starc	Australia	2.21 m	3
7	Gianmarco Tamberi	Italy	2.21 m	2
8	Marco Fassinotti	Italy	2.21 m	1

Men's Long Jump
Place	Athlete	Country	Mark	Points
1st place, gold medalist(s)	Miltiadis Tentoglou	Greece	8.24 m (+0.2 m/s)	8
2nd place, silver medalist(s)	Tajay Gayle	Jamaica	NM / 8.29 m (+0.2 m/s)	7
3rd place, bronze medalist(s)	Thobias Montler	Sweden	NM / 8.27 m (+0.4 m/s)	6
4	Marquis Dendy	United States	7.99 m (−0.1 m/s)	5
5	Ruswahl Samaai	South Africa	7.95 m (−0.1 m/s)	4
6	Filippo Randazzo	Italy	7.92 m (+0.1 m/s)	3
7	Kevin Mayer	France	7.35 m (−0.2 m/s)	2

Women's 200m (+0.7 m/s)
Place	Athlete	Country	Time	Points
1st place, gold medalist(s)	Shaunae Miller-Uibo	Bahamas	22.23	8
2nd place, silver medalist(s)	Marie-Josée Ta Lou	Ivory Coast	22.25	7
3rd place, bronze medalist(s)	Shelly-Ann Fraser-Pryce	Jamaica	22.48	6
4	Mujinga Kambundji	Switzerland	22.75	5
5	Dezerea Bryant	United States	22.79	4
6	Tamara Clark	United States	22.95	3
	Blessing Okagbare	Nigeria	DQ	

Women's 800m
Place	Athlete	Country	Time	Points
1st place, gold medalist(s)	Laura Muir	Great Britain	1:56.73	8
2nd place, silver medalist(s)	Jemma Reekie	Great Britain	1:56.96	7
3rd place, bronze medalist(s)	Kate Grace	United States	1:57.20	6
4	Natoya Goule	Jamaica	1:57.35	5
5	Habitam Alemu	Ethiopia	1:57.71	4
6	Rénelle Lamote	France	1:57.98	3
7	Halimah Nakaayi	Uganda	1:58.03	2
8	Catriona Bisset	Australia	1:58.42	1
9	Rose Mary Almanza	Cuba	1:58.51	
	Sahily Diago	Cuba	DNF	

Women's 1500m
Place	Athlete	Country	Time	Points
1st place, gold medalist(s)	Faith Kipyegon	Kenya	3:51.07	8
2nd place, silver medalist(s)	Sifan Hassan	Netherlands	3:53.60	7
3rd place, bronze medalist(s)	Freweyni Hailu	Ethiopia	3:56.28	6
4	Winnie Nanyondo	Uganda	4:01.18	5
5	Ciara Mageean	Ireland	4:02.48	4
6	Esther Guerrero	Spain	4:02.53	3
7	Winny Chebet	Kenya	4:02.77	2
8	Aurore Fleury	France	4:03.35	1
9	Hanna Klein	Germany	4:03.42	
10	Heather MacLean	United States	4:03.63	
11	Cory McGee	United States	4:04.20	
12	Sara Benfares	Germany	4:07.30	
	Chanelle Price	United States	DNF	

Women's 3000mSC
Place	Athlete	Country	Time	Points
1st place, gold medalist(s)	Hyvin Jepkemoi	Kenya	9:03.82	8
2nd place, silver medalist(s)	Beatrice Chepkoech	Kenya	9:04.94	7
3rd place, bronze medalist(s)	Winfred Yavi	Bahrain	9:05.45	6
4	Emma Coburn	United States	9:09.02	5
5	Gesa Felicitas Krause	Germany	9:15.03	4
6	Genevieve Gregson	Australia	9:17.81	3
7	Elizabeth Bird	Great Britain	9:22.80	2
8	Lomi Muleta	Ethiopia	9:22.84	1
9	Irene Sánchez-Escribano	Spain	9:33.72	
	Fancy Cherono	Kenya	DNF	
	Purity Cherotich Kirui	Kenya	DNF	

Women's Pole Vault
Place	Athlete	Country	Mark	Points
1st place, gold medalist(s)	Katie Moon	United States	4.90 m	8
2nd place, silver medalist(s)	Anzhelika Sidorova	Authorised Neutral Athletes	4.80 m	7
3rd place, bronze medalist(s)	Katerina Stefanidi	Greece	4.80 m	6
4	Holly Bradshaw	Great Britain	4.70 m	5
5	Iryna Zhuk	Belarus	4.70 m	4
6	Sandi Morris	United States	4.50 m	3
7	Angelica Moser	Switzerland	4.50 m	2
8	Tina Šutej	Slovenia	4.50 m	1
	Polina Knoroz	Authorised Neutral Athletes	NM	
	Roberta Bruni	Italy	NM	

Women's Triple Jump
Place	Athlete	Country	Mark	Points
1st place, gold medalist(s)	Shanieka Ricketts	Jamaica	14.29 m (+0.4 m/s) / 14.75 m (+0.4 m/s)	8
2nd place, silver medalist(s)	Yulimar Rojas	Venezuela	NM / 15.12 m (±0.0 m/s)	7
3rd place, bronze medalist(s)	Patrícia Mamona	Portugal	NM / 14.66 m (−0.2 m/s)	6
4	Ana Peleteiro	Spain	14.57 m (−0.8 m/s)	5
5	Kimberly Williams	Jamaica	14.50 m (−0.2 m/s)	4
6	Senni Salminen	Finland	14.34 m (±0.0 m/s)	3
7	Paraskevi Papachristou	Greece	14.25 m (−0.2 m/s)	2
8	Núbia Soares	Brazil	14.11 m (−0.4 m/s)	1
9	Dariya Derkach	Italy	13.81 m (−0.1 m/s)	

Women's Javelin Throw
Place	Athlete	Country	Mark	Points
1st place, gold medalist(s)	Barbora Špotáková	Czech Republic	63.08 m	8
2nd place, silver medalist(s)	Maria Andrejczyk	Poland	58.01 m / 63.63 m	7
3rd place, bronze medalist(s)	Christin Hussong	Germany	57.73 m / 61.65 m	6
4	Tatsiana Khaladovich	Belarus	59.15 m	5
5	Elizabeth Gleadle	Canada	58.40 m	4
6	Nikola Ogrodníková	Czech Republic	56.87 m	3
7	Victoria Hudson	Austria	56.45 m	2

== See also ==
- 2021 Weltklasse Zürich (Diamond League final)
