= 2021 Bislett Games =

- Dates: 1 July 2021
- Host city: Oslo, Norway
- Venue: Bislett Stadium
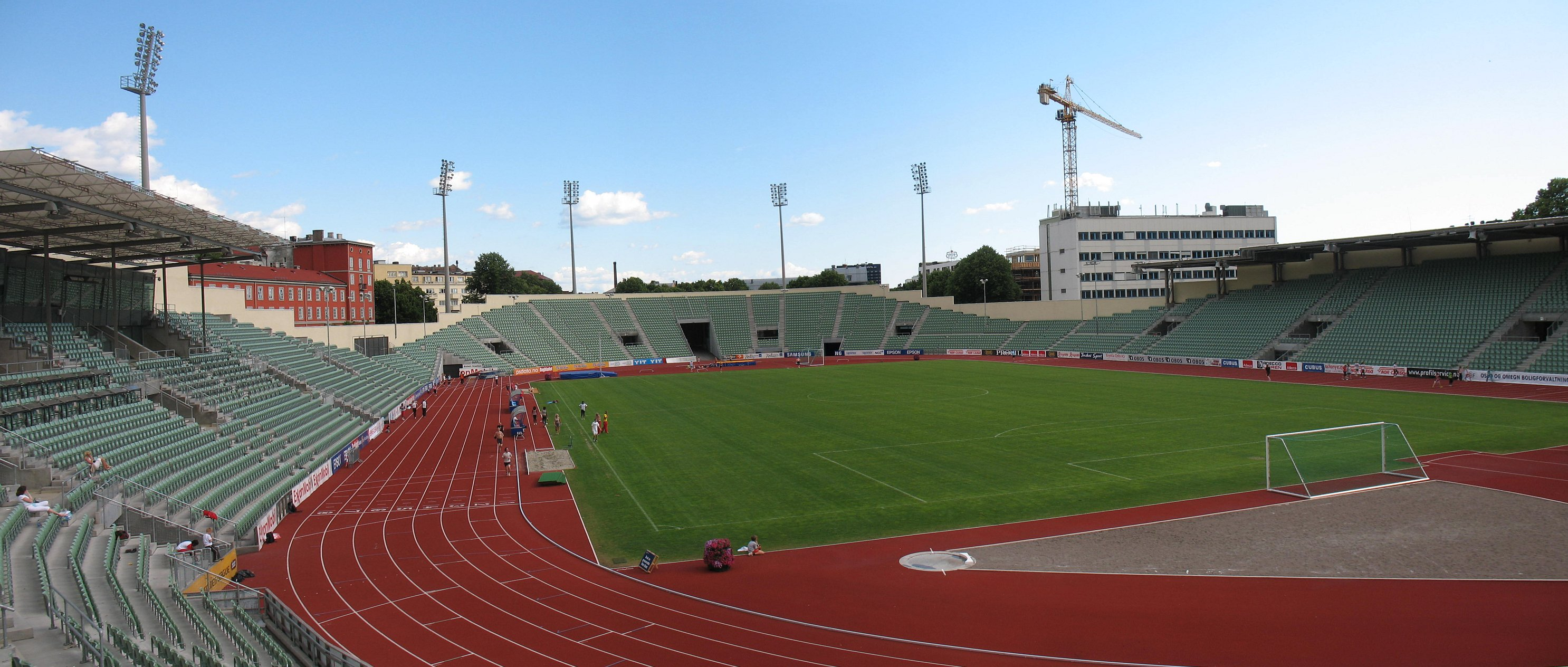
- Level: 2021 Diamond League

The 2021 Bislett Games was the 56th edition of the annual outdoor track and field meeting in Oslo, Norway. Held on 1 July at Bislett Stadium, it was the fourth leg of the 2021 Diamond League – the highest level international track and field circuit.

The meeting was highlighted by hometown favorite Karsten Warholm running 46.70 seconds to break the 400 metres hurdles world record in the final event. It was Warholm's first world record, achieved in his season debut -- and he would go on to break it again by an even wider margin at the 2021 Summer Olympics final.

Other highlights of the meet included Yomif Kejelcha running a 7:26 3000 metres and Stewart McSweyn beating Craig Mottram's Australian record in the mile with a 3:48.37 clocking.

== Results ==
Athletes competing in the Diamond League disciplines earned extra compensation and points which went towards qualifying for the Diamond League finals in Zürich. First place earned eight points, with each step down in place earning one less point than the previous, until no points are awarded in ninth place or lower.

The top-3 athletes in throwing and horizontal jumping events are ranked by the "Final 3" format, with their best mark overall in italics if it differs from their final trial.

=== Diamond Discipline ===
Men's 200m (−1.0 m/s)
| Place | Athlete | Country | Time | Points |
|---|---|---|---|---|
| 1st place, gold medalist(s) | Andre De Grasse | Canada | 20.09 | 8 |
| 2nd place, silver medalist(s) | Aaron Brown | Canada | 20.38 | 7 |
| 3rd place, bronze medalist(s) | Isaac Makwala | Botswana | 20.61 | 6 |
| 4 | Fausto Desalu | Italy | 20.71 | 5 |
| 5 | Vernon Norwood | United States | 20.74 | 4 |
| 6 | Mouhamadou Fall | France | 20.92 | 3 |
| 7 | Alex Wilson | Switzerland | 20.98 | 2 |
| 8 | Mathias Hove Johansen | Norway | 21.36 | 1 |

Men's Mile
| Place | Athlete | Country | Time | Points |
|---|---|---|---|---|
| 1st place, gold medalist(s) | Stewart McSweyn | Australia | 3:48.37 | 8 |
| 2nd place, silver medalist(s) | Marcin Lewandowski | Poland | 3:49.11 | 7 |
| 3rd place, bronze medalist(s) | Jye Edwards | Australia | 3:49.27 | 6 |
| 4 | Charles Simotwo | Kenya | 3:49.40 | 5 |
| 5 | Ismael Debjani | Belgium | 3:52.70 | 4 |
| 6 | Ronald Musagala | Uganda | 3:53.04 | 3 |
| 7 | Musab Adam Ali | Qatar | 3:53.15 | 2 |
| 8 | Ferdinand Kvan Edman | Norway | 3:53.42 | 1 |
| 9 | Charlie Grice | Great Britain | 3:54.97 | |
| 10 | Ignacio Fontes | Spain | 3:59.82 | |
| | Mounir Akbache | France | DNF | |
| | Boaz Kiprugut | Kenya | DNF | |

Men's 3000m
| Place | Athlete | Country | Time | Points |
|---|---|---|---|---|
| 1st place, gold medalist(s) | Yomif Kejelcha | Ethiopia | 7:26.25 | 8 |
| 2nd place, silver medalist(s) | Jacob Krop | Kenya | 7:30.07 | 7 |
| 3rd place, bronze medalist(s) | Nicholas Kimeli | Kenya | 7:31.33 | 6 |
| 4 | Birhanu Balew | Bahrain | 7:33.05 | 5 |
| 5 | Filip Ingebrigtsen | Norway | 7:34.00 | 4 |
| 6 | Justus Soget | Kenya | 7:35.91 | 3 |
| 7 | Tadese Worku | Ethiopia | 7:37.48 | 2 |
| 8 | David McNeill | Australia | 7:39.43 | 1 |
| 9 | Michael Kibet | Kenya | 7:43.46 | |
| 10 | Kieran Lumb | Canada | 7:46.28 | |
| 11 | Bethwell Birgen | Kenya | 7:46.84 | |
| 12 | Zerei Kbrom Mezngi | Norway | 7:47.16 | |
| | Jerry Motsau | South Africa | DNF | |
| | Vincent Kibet | Kenya | DNF | |

Men's 400mH
| Place | Athlete | Country | Time | Points |
|---|---|---|---|---|
| 1st place, gold medalist(s) | Karsten Warholm | Norway | 46.70 | 8 |
| 2nd place, silver medalist(s) | Alison dos Santos | Brazil | 47.38 | 7 |
| 3rd place, bronze medalist(s) | Yasmani Copello | Turkey | 48.86 | 6 |
| 4 | Rasmus Mägi | Estonia | 48.95 | 5 |
| 5 | Constantin Preis | Germany | 49.79 | 4 |
| 6 | Ramsey Angela | Netherlands | 49.81 | 3 |
| | Thomas Barr | Ireland | DNF | |
| | Ludvy Vaillant | France | DNF | |

Men's Pole Vault
| Place | Athlete | Country | Mark | Points |
|---|---|---|---|---|
| 1st place, gold medalist(s) | Armand Duplantis | Sweden | 6.01 m | 8 |
| 2nd place, silver medalist(s) | Sam Kendricks | United States | 5.91 m | 7 |
| 3rd place, bronze medalist(s) | Renaud Lavillenie | France | 5.81 m | 6 |
| 4 | Valentin Lavillenie | France | 5.71 m | 5 |
| 5 | Simen Guttormsen | Norway | 5.61 m | 4 |
| 6 | Sondre Guttormsen | Norway | 5.51 m | 3 |
| 7 | Pål Haugen Lillefosse | Norway | 5.31 m | 2 |
| | Melker Svärd Jacobsson | Sweden | NM | |
| | Cole Walsh | United States | NM | |

Men's Triple Jump
| Place | Athlete | Country | Mark | Points |
|---|---|---|---|---|
| 1st place, gold medalist(s) | Yasser Triki | Algeria | 17.23 m (−0.5 m/s) / 17.24 m (+0.1 m/s) | 8 |
| 2nd place, silver medalist(s) | Andy Díaz | Cuba | NM / 16.78 m (+0.3 m/s) | 7 |
| 3rd place, bronze medalist(s) | Tiago Pereira | Portugal | NM / 16.64 m (−0.5 m/s) | 6 |
| 4 | Pablo Torrijos | Spain | 16.50 m (−0.3 m/s) | 5 |
| 5 | Max Heß | Germany | 16.45 m (−1.0 m/s) | 4 |
| 6 | Donald Scott | United States | 15.92 m (−0.5 m/s) | 3 |
| 7 | Jesper Hellström | Sweden | 15.77 m (−0.1 m/s) | 2 |

Men's Discus Throw
| Place | Athlete | Country | Mark | Points |
|---|---|---|---|---|
| 1st place, gold medalist(s) | Daniel Ståhl | Sweden | 65.72 m / 68.65 m | 8 |
| 2nd place, silver medalist(s) | Kristjan Čeh | Slovenia | 65.72 m / 66.68 m | 7 |
| 3rd place, bronze medalist(s) | Lukas Weißhaidinger | Austria | 61.03 m / 65.67 m | 6 |
| 4 | Andrius Gudžius | Lithuania | 65.57 m | 5 |
| 5 | Simon Pettersson | Sweden | 64.62 m | 4 |
| 6 | Fedrick Dacres | Jamaica | 62.60 m | 3 |
| 7 | Alin Firfirică | Romania | 61.67 m | 2 |
| 8 | Ola Stunes Isene | Norway | 60.80 m | 1 |

Women's 100m (−0.3 m/s)
| Place | Athlete | Country | Time | Points |
|---|---|---|---|---|
| 1st place, gold medalist(s) | Marie-Josée Ta Lou | Ivory Coast | 10.91 | 8 |
| 2nd place, silver medalist(s) | Daryll Neita | Great Britain | 11.06 | 7 |
| 3rd place, bronze medalist(s) | Ajla Del Ponte | Switzerland | 11.16 | 6 |
| 4 | Javianne Oliver | United States | 11.18 | 5 |
| 5 | Hana Basic | Australia | 11.42 | 4 |
| 6 | Jamile Samuel | Netherlands | 11.50 | 3 |
| 7 | Tianna Bartoletta | United States | 11.51 | 2 |

Women's 800m
| Place | Athlete | Country | Time | Points |
|---|---|---|---|---|
| 1st place, gold medalist(s) | Kate Grace | United States | 1:57.60 | 8 |
| 2nd place, silver medalist(s) | Halimah Nakaayi | Uganda | 1:58.70 | 7 |
| 3rd place, bronze medalist(s) | Lore Hoffmann | Switzerland | 1:59.06 | 6 |
| 4 | Catriona Bisset | Australia | 1:59.30 | 5 |
| 5 | Lovisa Lindh | Sweden | 1:59.81 | 4 |
| 6 | Katharina Trost | Germany | 2:00.02 | 3 |
| 7 | Adelle Tracey | Great Britain | 2:00.82 | 2 |
| 8 | Hedda Hynne | Norway | 2:01.65 | 1 |
| | Aneta Lemiesz | Poland | DNF | |

Women's 5000m
| Place | Athlete | Country | Time | Points |
|---|---|---|---|---|
| 1st place, gold medalist(s) | Hellen Obiri | Kenya | 14:26.38 | 8 |
| 2nd place, silver medalist(s) | Fantu Worku | Ethiopia | 14:26.80 | 7 |
| 3rd place, bronze medalist(s) | Margaret Kipkemboi | Kenya | 14:28.24 | 6 |
| 4 | Eilish McColgan | Great Britain | 14:28.55 | 5 |
| 5 | Beatrice Chebet | Kenya | 14:34.55 | 4 |
| 6 | Yasemin Can | Turkey | 14:46.13 | 2 |
| 7 | Karoline Bjerkeli Grøvdal | Norway | 14:47.67 | 1 |
| 8 | Andrea Seccafien | Canada | 15:10.00 | |
| 9 | Sarah Lahti | Sweden | 15:10.24 | |
| 10 | Camille Buscomb | New Zealand | 15:23.90 | |
| | Tsehay Gemechu | Ethiopia | ~~14:38.76~~ | DSQ |
| | Kate Van Buskirk | Canada | DNF | |

Women's 400mH
| Place | Athlete | Country | Time | Points |
|---|---|---|---|---|
| 1st place, gold medalist(s) | Femke Bol | Netherlands | 53.33 | 8 |
| 2nd place, silver medalist(s) | Anna Ryzhykova | Ukraine | 54.15 | 7 |
| 3rd place, bronze medalist(s) | Viktoriya Tkachuk | Ukraine | 54.62 | 6 |
| 4 | Amalie Iuel | Norway | 55.04 | 5 |
| 5 | Leah Nugent | Jamaica | 55.37 | 4 |
| 6 | Léa Sprunger | Switzerland | 55.46 | 3 |
| 7 | Sage Watson | Canada | 56.52 | 2 |
| | Line Kloster | Norway | DNS | |

Women's Long Jump
| Place | Athlete | Country | Mark | Points |
|---|---|---|---|---|
| 1st place, gold medalist(s) | Malaika Mihambo | Germany | 6.83 m (−0.3 m/s) / 6.86 m (+0.9 m/s) | 8 |
| 2nd place, silver medalist(s) | Ivana Vuleta | Serbia | 6.61 m (−0.2 m/s) / 6.66 m (+0.5 m/s) | 7 |
| 3rd place, bronze medalist(s) | Nastassia Mironchyk-Ivanova | Belarus | 6.58 m (−0.2 m/s) / 6.72 m (±0.0 m/s) | 6 |
| 4 | Jazmin Sawyers | Great Britain | 6.54 m (+0.6 m/s) | 5 |
| 5 | Tilde Johansson | Sweden | 6.48 m (+1.6 m/s) | 4 |
| 6 | Abigail Irozuru | Great Britain | 6.35 m (−0.6 m/s) | 3 |
| 7 | Anasztázia Nguyen | Hungary | 6.18 m (+0.1 m/s) | 2 |
| — | Maryna Bekh-Romanchuk | Ukraine | NM | |

Women's Javelin Throw
| Place | Athlete | Country | Mark | Points |
|---|---|---|---|---|
| 1st place, gold medalist(s) | Christin Hussong | Germany | 60.95 m / 62.62 m | 8 |
| 2nd place, silver medalist(s) | Maria Andrejczyk | Poland | 60.35 m / 62.67 m | 7 |
| 3rd place, bronze medalist(s) | Kelsey-Lee Barber | Australia | 59.30 m / 60.86 m | 6 |
| 4 | Barbora Špotáková | Czech Republic | 60.38 m | 5 |
| 5 | Tatsiana Khaladovich | Belarus | 59.40 m | 4 |
| 6 | Victoria Hudson | Austria | 59.34 m | 3 |
| 7 | Līna Mūze | Latvia | 58.44 m | 2 |
| 8 | Marie-Therese Obst | Norway | 57.02 m | 1 |

=== National Events ===
Men's 100m (+0.2 m/s)
| Place | Athlete | Country | Time |
|---|---|---|---|
| 1st place, gold medalist(s) | Salum Ageze Kashafali | Norway | 10.58 |
| 2nd place, silver medalist(s) | Filip Bøe | Norway | 10.68 |
| 3rd place, bronze medalist(s) | Even Pettersen | Norway | 10.70 |
| 4 | Øyvind Strømmen Kjerpeset | Norway | 10.77 |
| 5 | Patrick Monga Bifuko | DR Congo | 10.78 |
| 6 | Daniel Alejandro Johnsen | Norway | 10.95 |
| 7 | Hallgeir Martinsen | Norway | 10.98 |
| 8 | Vegard Dragsund Sverd | Norway | 11.21 |

== See also ==
- 2021 Weltklasse Zürich (Diamond League final)
