= 2021 Golden Gala =

- Dates: 10 June
- Host city: Florence, Italy
- Venue: Stadio Luigi Ridolfi
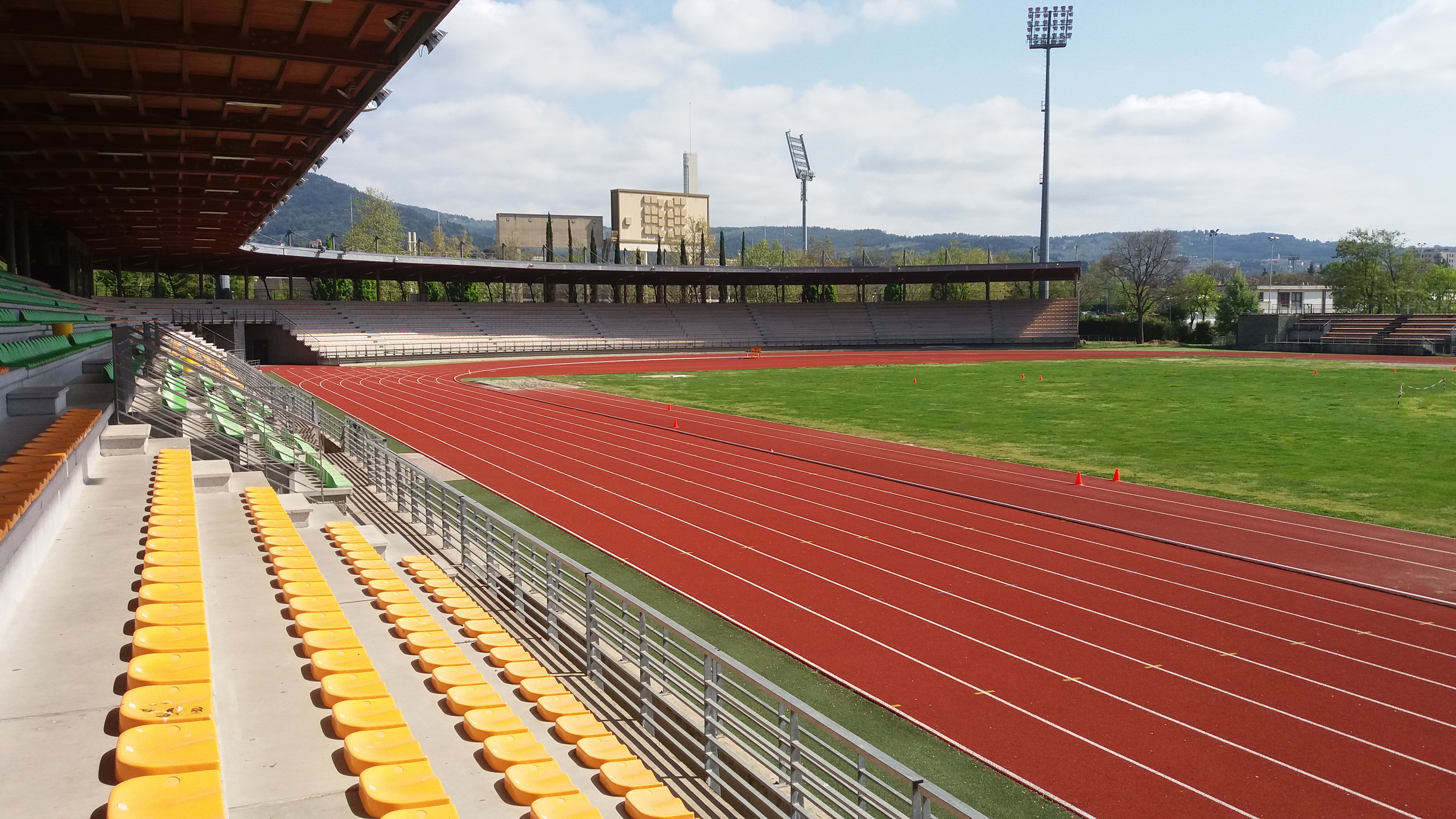
- Level: 2021 Diamond League

The 2021 Golden Gala was the 41st edition of the annual outdoor track and field meeting held in Italy, this time in Florence rather than the usual Rome location. Held on 10 June at the Stadio Luigi Ridolfi, it was the third leg of the 2021 Diamond League – the highest level international track and field circuit.

The meeting was highlighted by Dina Asher-Smith's victory in the 200 metres, as well as Jakob Ingebrigtsen's unexpected European record in the 5000 metres with a time of 12:48.45 in his first sub-13 clocking.

== Results ==
Athletes competing in the Diamond League disciplines earned extra compensation and points which went towards qualifying for the Diamond League finals in Zürich. First place earned 8 points, with each step down in place earning one less point than the previous, until no points are awarded in 9th place or lower.

The top-3 athletes in throwing and horizontal jumping events are ranked by the "Final 3" format, with their best mark overall in italics if it differs from their final trial.

=== Diamond Discipline ===
Men's 100m (−0.1 m/s)
Place	Athlete	Country	Time	Points
1st place, gold medalist(s)	Akani Simbine	South Africa	10.08	8
2nd place, silver medalist(s)	CJ Ujah	Great Britain	10.10	7
3rd place, bronze medalist(s)	Emmanuel Matadi	Liberia	10.16	6
4	Yupun Abeykoon	Sri Lanka	10.16	5
5	Mike Rodgers	United States	10.25	4
6	Arthur Cissé	Ivory Coast	10.35	3
7	Cejhae Greene	Antigua and Barbuda	10.39	2
8	Jak Ali Harvey	Turkey	10.46	1

Men's 400m
Place	Athlete	Country	Time	Points
1st place, gold medalist(s)	Anthony Zambrano	Colombia	44.76	8
2nd place, silver medalist(s)	Davide Re	Italy	45.80	7
3rd place, bronze medalist(s)	Matthew Hudson-Smith	Great Britain	45.93	6
4	Zakithi Nene	South Africa	46.23	5
5	Ricky Petrucciani	Switzerland	46.24	4
6	Edoardo Scotti	Italy	46.38	3
7	Vladimir Aceti	Italy	46.55	2
	Machel Cedenio	Trinidad and Tobago	DNF	

Men's 5000m
Place	Athlete	Country	Time	Points
1st place, gold medalist(s)	Jakob Ingebrigtsen	Norway	12:48.45	8
2nd place, silver medalist(s)	Hagos Gebrhiwet	Ethiopia	12:49.02	7
3rd place, bronze medalist(s)	Mohammed Ahmed	Canada	12:50.12	6
4	Mohamed Katir	Spain	12:50.79	5
5	Justyn Knight	Canada	12:51.93	4
6	Joshua Cheptegei	Uganda	12:54.69	3
7	Birhanu Balew	Bahrain	12:57.71	2
8	Robert Kiprop	Kenya	13:12.56	1
9	Yemaneberhan Crippa	Italy	13:17.96	
10	Telahun Haile Bekele	Ethiopia	13:18.29	
11	Stewart McSweyn	Australia	13:20.11	
12	Isaac Kimeli	Belgium	13:21.66	
13	Muktar Edris	Ethiopia	13:25.98	
14	Iliass Aouani	Italy	13:28.09	
15	Matthew Ramsden	Australia	13:32.37	
	Ryan Gregson	Australia	DNF	
	Abdalaati Iguider	Morocco	DNF	
	Henrik Ingebrigtsen	Norway	DNF	

Men's 110mH (−0.1 m/s)
Place	Athlete	Country	Time	Points
1st place, gold medalist(s)	Omar McLeod	Jamaica	13.01	8
2nd place, silver medalist(s)	Andrew Pozzi	Great Britain	13.25	7
3rd place, bronze medalist(s)	Wilhem Belocian	France	13.31	6
4	Devon Allen	United States	13.32	5
5	Shane Brathwaite	Barbados	13.46	4
6	Lorenzo Perini	Italy	13.63	3
7	Paolo Dal Molin	Italy	13.64	2
8	Pascal Martinot-Lagarde	France	14.26	1

Men's 3000mSC
Place	Athlete	Country	Time	Points
1st place, gold medalist(s)	Soufiane El Bakkali	Morocco	8:08.54	8
2nd place, silver medalist(s)	Tadese Takele	Ethiopia	8:10.56	7
3rd place, bronze medalist(s)	Mohamed Tindouft	Morocco	8:11.65	6
4	Ahmed Abdelwahed	Italy	8:12.04	5
5	Chala Beyo	Ethiopia	8:12.35	4
6	Osama Zoghlami	Italy	8:14.29	3
7	Djilali Bedrani	France	8:15.87	2
8	Yemane Haileselassie	Eritrea	8:16.75	1
9	Louis Gilavert	France	8:19.79	
10	Albert Chemutai	Uganda	8:23.96	
11	Abdelhamid Zerrifi	France	8:25.74	
12	Yohanes Chiappinelli	Italy	8:27.86	
13	Jean-Simon Desgagnés	Canada	8:39.47	
	Conseslus Kipruto	Kenya	DNF	
	Wilberforce Chemiat Kones	Kenya	DNF	

Men's High Jump
Place	Athlete	Country	Mark	Points
1st place, gold medalist(s)	Ilya Ivanyuk	Authorised Neutral Athletes	2.33 m	8
2nd place, silver medalist(s)	Brandon Starc	Australia	2.33 m	7
3rd place, bronze medalist(s)	Gianmarco Tamberi	Italy	2.33 m	6
4	Andriy Protsenko	Ukraine	2.30 m	5
5	Mutaz Essa Barshim	Qatar	2.30 m	4
6	Maksim Nedasekau	Belarus	2.27 m	3
7	Loïc Gasch	Switzerland	2.20 m	2
8	Donald Thomas	Bahamas	2.20 m	1
9	Stefano Sottile	Italy	2.16 m	

Men's Shot Put
Place	Athlete	Country	Mark	Points
1st place, gold medalist(s)	Tom Walsh	New Zealand	21.47 m	8
2nd place, silver medalist(s)	Armin Sinančević	Serbia	20.93 m / 21.60 m	7
3rd place, bronze medalist(s)	Leonardo Fabbri	Italy	19.82 m / 21.71 m	6
4	Filip Mihaljević	Croatia	21.39 m	5
5	Michał Haratyk	Poland	20.90 m	4
6	Tomáš Staněk	Czech Republic	20.32 m	3
7	Zane Weir	Italy	20.06 m	2
8	Konrad Bukowiecki	Poland	19.23 m	1

Women's 200m (+0.2 m/s)
Place	Athlete	Country	Time	Points
1st place, gold medalist(s)	Dina Asher-Smith	Great Britain	22.06	8
2nd place, silver medalist(s)	Marie-Josée Ta Lou	Ivory Coast	22.58	7
3rd place, bronze medalist(s)	Mujinga Kambundji	Switzerland	22.60	6
4	Dalia Kaddari	Italy	22.86	5
5	Beth Dobbin	Great Britain	22.88	4
6	Dafne Schippers	Netherlands	23.03	3
7	Gloria Hooper	Italy	23.25	2
8	Sarah Atcho	Switzerland	24.43	1

Women's 1500m
Place	Athlete	Country	Time	Points
1st place, gold medalist(s)	Sifan Hassan	Netherlands	3:53.63	8
2nd place, silver medalist(s)	Faith Kipyegon	Kenya	3:53.91	7
3rd place, bronze medalist(s)	Laura Muir	Great Britain	3:55.59	6
4	Gabriela DeBues-Stafford	Canada	4:00.46	5
5	Winnie Nanyondo	Uganda	4:00.84	4
6	Eilish McColgan	Great Britain	4:02.12	3
7	Elise Vanderelst	Belgium	4:02.63	2
8	Lemlem Hailu	Ethiopia	4:03.24	1
9	Esther Guerrero	Spain	4:03.67	
10	Katie Snowden	Great Britain	4:03.86	
11	Gaia Sabbatini	Italy	4:04.23	
12	Ciara Mageean	Ireland	4:04.32	
13	Rababe Arafi	Morocco	4:04.72	
14	Federica Del Buono	Italy	4:08.58	
	Aneta Lemiesz	Poland	DNF	
	Solange Pereira	Spain	DNF	

Women's 100mH (−0.8 m/s)
Place	Athlete	Country	Time	Points
1st place, gold medalist(s)	Jasmine Camacho-Quinn	Puerto Rico	12.38	8
2nd place, silver medalist(s)	Devynne Charlton	Bahamas	12.80	7
3rd place, bronze medalist(s)	Elvira Herman	Belarus	12.85	6
4	Megan Tapper	Jamaica	12.94	5
5	Luminosa Bogliolo	Italy	12.99	4
6	Pia Skrzyszowska	Poland	13.03	3
7	Pedrya Seymour	Bahamas	13.51	2
	Elisa Di Lazzaro	Italy	DNF	

Women's 400mH
Place	Athlete	Country	Time	Points
1st place, gold medalist(s)	Femke Bol	Netherlands	53.44	8
2nd place, silver medalist(s)	Anna Ryzhykova	Ukraine	54.19	7
3rd place, bronze medalist(s)	Jessica Turner	Great Britain	54.79	6
4	Wenda Nel	South Africa	55.20	5
5	Sara Petersen	Denmark	55.21	4
6	Linda Olivieri	Italy	55.63	3
7	Ayomide Folorunso	Italy	56.92	2
8	Tia-Adana Belle	Barbados	58.36	1

Women's Pole Vault
Place	Athlete	Country	Mark	Points
1st place, gold medalist(s)	Anzhelika Sidorova	Authorised Neutral Athletes	4.91 m	8
2nd place, silver medalist(s)	Iryna Zhuk	Belarus	4.71 m	7
3rd place, bronze medalist(s)	Katerina Stefanidi	Greece	4.66 m	6
4	Angelica Bengtsson	Sweden	4.66 m	5
5	Holly Bradshaw	Great Britain	4.66 m	4
6	Robeilys Peinado	Venezuela	4.66 m	3
7	Tina Šutej	Slovenia	4.56 m	2
8	Angelica Moser	Switzerland	4.56 m	1
	Roberta Bruni	Italy	NM	

Women's Long Jump
Place	Athlete	Country	Mark	Points
1st place, gold medalist(s)	Ivana Vuleta	Serbia	6.56 m (−0.7 m/s) / 6.74 m (+0.9 m/s)	8
2nd place, silver medalist(s)	Malaika Mihambo	Germany	6.33 m (±0.0 m/s) / 6.82 m (+0.3 m/s)	7
3rd place, bronze medalist(s)	Maryna Bekh-Romanchuk	Ukraine	NM / 6.79 m (+0.3 m/s)	6
4	Chantel Malone	British Virgin Islands	6.65 m (+1.1 m/s)	5
5	Nastassia Mironchyk-Ivanova	Belarus	6.61 m (+0.1 m/s)	4
6	Larissa Iapichino	Italy	6.45 m (−0.3 m/s)	3
7	Laura Strati	Italy	6.29 m (±0.0 m/s)	2
8	Caterine Ibargüen	Colombia	6.10 m (−0.7 m/s)	1

Women's Discus Throw
Place	Athlete	Country	Mark	Points
1st place, gold medalist(s)	Sandra Perković	Croatia	66.90 m / 68.31 m	8
2nd place, silver medalist(s)	Yaime Pérez	Cuba	65.37 m / 66.82 m	7
3rd place, bronze medalist(s)	Kristin Pudenz	Germany	61.70 m / 64.42 m	6
4	Marija Tolj	Croatia	63.28 m	5
5	Claudine Vita	Germany	62.72 m	4
6	Liliana Cá	Portugal	62.30 m	3
7	Denia Caballero	Cuba	61.33 m	2
8	Daisy Osakue	Italy	56.20 m	1

== See also ==
- 2021 Diamond League
