= 2021 Diamond League =

- Edition: 12th
- Dates: 23 May – 9 September
- Events: 32
- Meetings: 12
- Individual Prize Money (US$): 7,000,000

The 2021 Diamond League, also known as the 2021 Wanda Diamond League for sponsorship reasons, was the twelfth season of the annual series of outdoor track and field meetings, organised by World Athletics. The 2021 season sees an increase back to 32 Diamond Disciplines from the 24 originally planned for the 2020 Diamond League. The final used a new format which took place over two days on 8–9 September in one final meet, the Weltklasse Zürich, as had been planned to be introduced in 2020 but was cancelled due to the COVID-19 pandemic.

A new award will be introduced for the "Best Performing Athletes" which will recognize ten athletes (five men and five women) for consistent top placements. US$50,000 will be awarded to one man and one woman in each of the sprints, hurdles, distance runnings, jumps, and throws.

== Schedule ==
Fourteen meetings were scheduled to be included in the 2021 season. Two of them did not take place: the Diamond League Shanghai (14 August) and a would be new Diamond League Shenzhen (22 August), both of which were cancelled due to restrictions related to the COVID-19 pandemic.

| Leg | Date | Meet | Stadium | City | Country | Events (M+W) |
|---|---|---|---|---|---|---|
| 1 | 23 May | Müller Grand Prix Gateshead | Gateshead International Stadium | Gateshead | United Kingdom | 7 + 7 = 14 |
| 2 | 28 May | Doha Diamond League | Qatar Sports Club Stadium | Doha | Qatar | 7 + 7 = 14 |
| 3 | 10 June | Golden Gala – Pietro Mennea | Stadio Luigi Ridolfi | Florence | Italy | 7 + 7 = 14 |
| 4 | 1 July | Bislett Games | Bislett Stadium | Oslo | Norway | 7 + 6 = 13 |
| 5 | 4 July | Bauhausgalan | Stockholm Olympic Stadium | Stockholm | Sweden | 7 + 7 = 14 |
| 6 | 9 July | Herculis EBS | Stade Louis II | Monaco | Monaco | 7 + 7 = 14 |
| 7 | 13 July | Müller British Grand Prix (Anniversary Games) | Gateshead International Stadium | Gateshead | United Kingdom | 7 + 7 = 14 |
| 8 | 21 August | Prefontaine Classic | Hayward Field | Eugene | United States | 7 + 7 = 14 |
| 9 | 26 August | Athletissima | Stade Olympique de la Pontaise | Lausanne | Switzerland | 7 + 7 = 14 |
| 10 | 28 August | Meeting de Paris | Stade Sébastien Charléty | Paris | France | 7 + 7 = 14 |
| 11 | 3 September | Allianz Memorial Van Damme | King Baudouin Stadium | Brussels | Belgium | 7 + 7 = 14 |
| 12 | 8–9 September | Weltklasse Zürich | Letzigrund | Zürich | Switzerland | 16 + 16 = 32 |

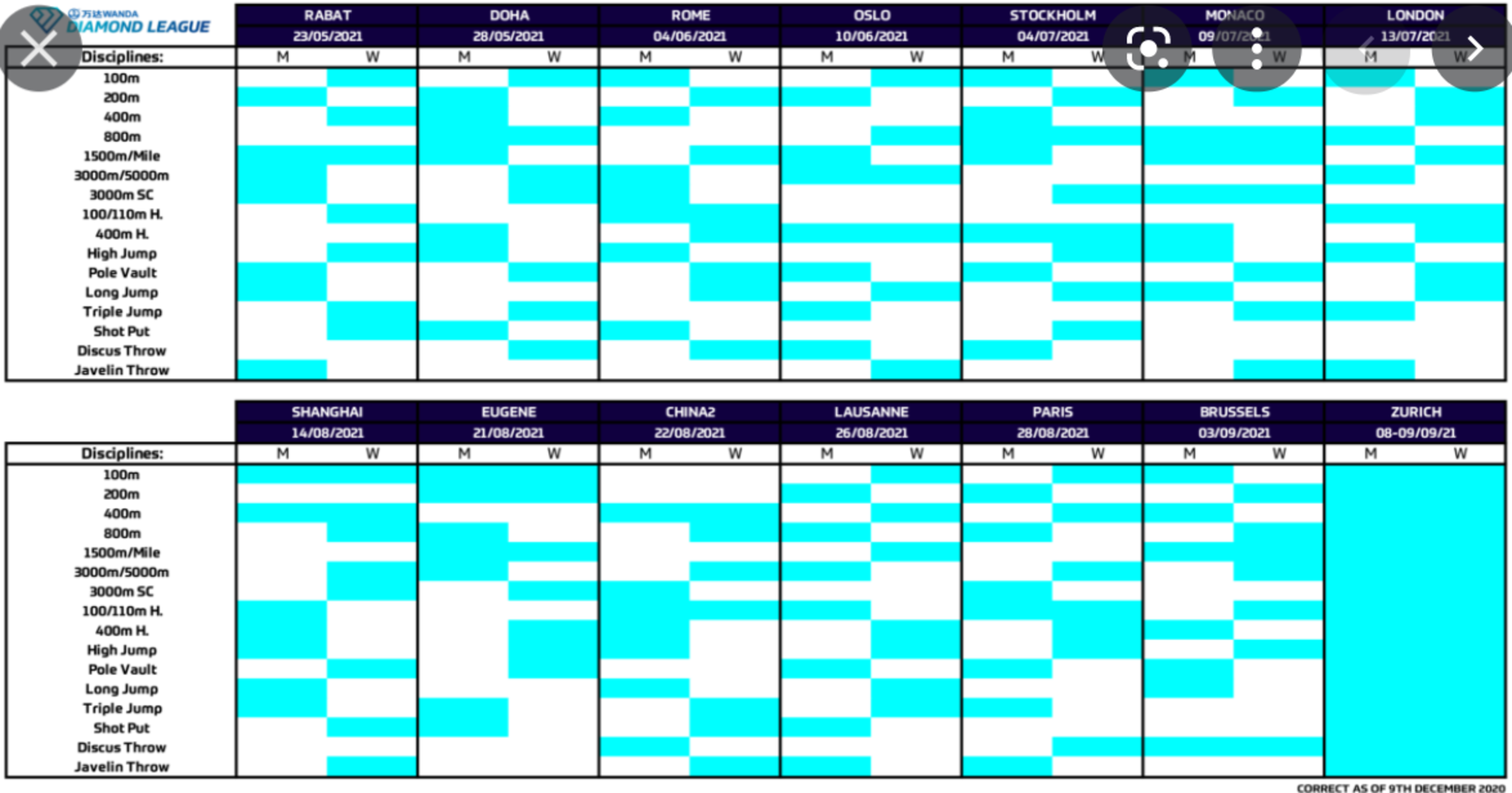

The Bislett Games in Oslo were originally scheduled to be the fourth meeting on 10 June, but on 10 April was delayed to an undetermined date (later scheduled for 1 July). On April 16 the first meeting on the calendar, Meeting de Rabat, was cancelled and the British Grand Prix in Gateshead was reintroduced to take its place on the same date. Additionally, the Golden Gala was relocated from Rome to Florence and pushed back to 10 June. On 7 May, UK Athletics announced the Anniversary Games will be relocated from the London Stadium due to the prohibitive costs of repurposing the stadium for only the meeting. On 27 May the Anniversary Games were confirmed to be moved to Gateshead and renamed the Müller British Grand Prix.

== Results ==
=== Men ===
==== Track ====
| # | Meeting | 100 m | 200 m | 400 m | 800 m | 1500 m | 5000 m | 110 m h | 400 m h | 3000 m st |
| 1 | Gateshead 1 | - | Kenny Bednarek (USA); 20.33 | - | - | Jakob Ingebrigtsen (NOR); 3:36.27 | Mohamed Katir (ESP); 13:08.52 PB | - | - | Hillary Bor (USA); 8:30.20 |
| 2 | Doha | - | Kenny Bednarek (USA); 19.88 | Michael Norman (USA); 44.27 WL | Wyclife Kinyamal (KEN); 1:43.91 | Timothy Cheruiyot (KEN); 3:30.48 | - | - | Rai Benjamin (USA); 47.38 MR | - |
| 3 | Florence | Akani Simbine (RSA); 10.08 | - | Anthony Zambrano (COL); 44.76 | - | - | Jakob Ingebrigtsen (NOR); 12:48.45 AR WL | Omar McLeod (JAM); 13.01 WL =MR | - | Soufiane El Bakkali (MAR); 8:08.54 |
| 4 | Oslo | - | Andre De Grasse (CAN); 20.09 | - | - | - | Yomif Kejelcha (ETH); 7:26.25 (3000 m) WL DLR MR PB | - | Karsten Warholm (NOR); 46.70 WR | - |
| 5 | Stockholm | Ronnie Baker (USA); 10.03 | - | Kirani James (GRN); 44.63 | Ferguson Rotich (KEN); 1:43.84 | Timothy Cheruiyot (KEN); 3:32.30 | - | - | Alison dos Santos (BRA); 47.34 | - |
| 6 | Monaco | Ronnie Baker (USA); 9.91 | - | - | Nijel Amos (BOT); 1:42.91 WL | Timothy Cheruiyot (KEN); 3:28.28 WL PB | - | - | Karsten Warholm (NOR); 47.08 MR | Lamecha Girma (ETH); 8:07.75 |
| 7 | Gateshead 2 | Trayvon Bromell (USA); 9.98 | - | - | Isaiah Harris (USA); 1:44.76 | - | Mohamed Katir (ESP); 7:27.64 (3000 m) NR MR | Ronald Levy (JAM); 13.22 | - | - |
| 8 | Eugene | Andre De Grasse (CAN); 9.74 | Noah Lyles (USA); 19.52 WL MR | - | Marco Arop (CAN); 1:44.51 | - | - | - | - | - |
| 9 | Lausanne | - | Kenny Bednarek (USA); 19.65 | - | Marco Arop (CAN); 1:44.50 | - | Jakob Ingebrigtsen (NOR); 7:33.06 (3000 m) | Devon Allen (USA); 13.07 | - | - |
| 10 | Paris | - | Fred Kerley (USA); 19.79 PB | - | Wyclife Kinyamal (KEN); 1:43.94 | - | - | Hansle Parchment (JAM); 13.03 SB | - | Benjamin Kigen (KEN); 8:07.12 WL |
| 11 | Brussels | Fred Kerley (USA); 9.94 | - | Michael Cherry (USA); 44.03 MR PB | - | Stewart McSweyn (AUS); 3:33.20 | - | - | Alison dos Santos (BRA); 48.23 | - |
| 12 | Zürich | Fred Kerley (USA); 9.87 | Kenny Bednarek (USA); 19.70 | Michael Cherry (USA); 44.41 | Emmanuel Korir (KEN); 1:44.56 | Timothy Cheruiyot (KEN); 3:31.37 | Berihu Aregawi (ETH); 12:58.65 | Devon Allen (USA); 13.06 SB | Karsten Warholm (NOR); 47.35 | Benjamin Kigen (KEN); 8:17.45 |

==== Field ====
| # | Meeting | Long jump | Triple jump | High jump | Pole vault | Shot put | Discus | Javelin |
| 1 | Gateshead 1 | Filippo Randazzo (ITA); 8.11 m | - | - | Sam Kendricks (USA); 5.74 m | - | - | Marcin Krukowski (POL); 81.18 m |
| 2 | Doha | - | - | Ilya Ivanyuk (ANA); 2.33 m | - | Tom Walsh (NZL); 21.63 m | - | - |
| 3 | Florence | - | - | Ilya Ivanyuk (ANA); 2.33 m | - | Tom Walsh (NZL); 21.47 m | - | - |
| 4 | Oslo | - | Yasser Triki (ALG); 17.24 m | - | Armand Duplantis (SWE); 6.01 m MR | - | Daniel Ståhl (SWE); 68.65 m | - |
| 5 | Stockholm | Tajay Gayle (JAM); 8.55 m SB | - | - | Armand Duplantis (SWE); 6.02 m MR | - | Daniel Ståhl (SWE); 68.64 m | - |
| 6 | Monaco | Miltiadis Tentoglou (GRE); 8.24 m | - | Mikhail Akimenko (ANA); 2.32 m | - | - | - | - |
| 7 | Gateshead 2 | - | Pedro Pichardo (POR); 17.50 m | Donald Thomas (BAH); 2.25 m | - | - | - | Johannes Vetter (GER); 85.25 m |
| 8 | Eugene | - | Pedro Pichardo (POR); 17.63 m | - | - | Ryan Crouser (USA); 23.15 m DLR MR | - | - |
| 9 | Lausanne | - | - | - | Christopher Nilsen (USA); 5.82 m | Ryan Crouser (USA); 22.81 m MR | - | Johannes Vetter (GER); 88.54 m |
| 10 | Paris | - | Hugues Fabrice Zango (BUR); 16.97 m | - | Armand Duplantis (SWE); 6.01 m MR | - | - | Anderson Peters (GRN); 85.98 m SB |
| 11 | Brussels | Steffin McCarter (USA); 7.99 m | - | - | Armand Duplantis (SWE); 6.05 m MR | - | Daniel Ståhl (SWE); 69.31 m | - |
| 12 | Zürich | Thobias Montler (SWE); 8.17 m | Pedro Pichardo (POR); 17.70 m | Gianmarco Tamberi (ITA); 2.34 m | Armand Duplantis (SWE); 6.06 m MR | Ryan Crouser (USA); 22.67 m MR | Daniel Ståhl (SWE); 66.49 m | Johannes Vetter (GER); 89.11 m |

=== Women ===
==== Track ====
| # | Meeting | 100 m | 200 m | 400 m | 800 m | 1500 m | 5000 m | 100 m h | 400 m h | 3000 m st |
| 1 | Gateshead 1 | Dina Asher-Smith (GBR); 11.35 | - | Kendall Ellis (USA); 51.86 | - | Laura Muir (GBR); 4:03.73 | - | Cindy Sember (GBR); 13.28 | - | - |
| 2 | Doha | Shelly-Ann Fraser-Pryce (JAM); 10.84 | - | - | Faith Kipyegon (KEN); 1:58.26 | - | Beatrice Chebet (KEN); 8:27.49 (3000 m) WL PB | - | - | Norah Jeruto (KEN); 9:00.67 |
| 3 | Florence | - | Dina Asher-Smith (GBR); 22.06 MR | - | - | Sifan Hassan (NED); 3:53.63 MR | - | Jasmine Camacho-Quinn (PUR); 12.38 MR | Femke Bol (NED); 53.44 | - |
| 4 | Oslo | Marie-Josée Ta Lou (CIV); 10.91 | - | - | Kate Grace (USA); 1:57.60 PB | - | Hellen Obiri (KEN); 14:26.38 | - | Femke Bol (NED); 53.33 | - |
| 5 | Stockholm | - | Shericka Jackson (JAM); 22.10 | - | Rose Mary Almanza (CUB); 1:56.28 MR PB | - | - | - | Femke Bol (NED); 52.37 NR DLR MR | Hyvin Kiyeng (KEN); 9:04.34 MR |
| 6 | Monaco | - | Shaunae Miller-Uibo (BAH); 22.23 | - | Laura Muir (GBR); 1:56.73 PB | Faith Kipyegon (KEN); 3:51.07 WL NR | - | - | - | Hyvin Kiyeng (KEN); 9:03.82 |
| 7 | Gateshead 2 | - | Elaine Thompson-Herah (JAM); 22.43 | Stephanie Ann McPherson (JAM); 50.44 | - | - | - | Cindy Sember (GBR); 12.69 | Femke Bol (NED); 53.24 | - |
| 8 | Eugene | Elaine Thompson-Herah (JAM); 10.54 WL NR DLR MR | Mujinga Kambundji (SUI); 22.06 | - | Athing Mu (USA); 1:55.04 MR | Faith Kipyegon (KEN); 3:53.23 MR | - | - | Dalilah Muhammad (USA) 52.77 MR | Norah Jeruto (KEN); 8:53.65 WL MR PB |
| 9 | Lausanne | Shelly-Ann Fraser-Pryce (JAM); 10.60 MR PB | - | Marileidy Paulino (DOM); 50.40 | - | Freweyni Hailu (ETH); 4:02.24 | - | - | Femke Bol (NED); 53.05 MR | - |
| 10 | Paris | Elaine Thompson-Herah (JAM); 10.72 MR | - | Marileidy Paulino (DOM); 50.12 | - | - | Francine Niyonsaba (BDI); 8:19.08 (3000 m) WL NR MR | Danielle Williams (JAM); 12.50 | Gianna Woodruff (PAN); 54.44 | - |
| 11 | Brussels | - | Christine Mboma (NAM); 21.84 | - | Natoya Goule (JAM); 1:58.09 | - | Francine Niyonsaba (BDI); 14:25.34 WL NR | Nadine Visser (NED); 12.69 | - | - |
| 12 | Zürich | Elaine Thompson-Herah (JAM); 10.65 MR | Christine Mboma (NAM); 21.78 WU20R AR | Quanera Hayes (USA); 49.88 | Keely Hodgkinson (GBR); 1:57.98 | Faith Kipyegon (KEN); 3:58.33 | Francine Niyonsaba (BDI); 14:28.98 | Tobi Amusan (NGR); 12.42 AR | Femke Bol (NED); 52.80 MR | Norah Jeruto (KEN); 9:07.33 |

==== Field ====
| # | Meeting | Long jump | Triple jump | High jump | Pole vault | Shot put | Discus | Javelin |
| 1 | Gateshead 1 | - | Shanieka Ricketts (JAM); 14.29 m | Kamila Lićwinko (POL); 1.91 m | - | Auriol Dongmo (POR); 18.16 m | - | - |
| 2 | Doha | - | Yulimar Rojas (VEN); 15.11 m | - | Katie Nageotte (USA); 4.84 m MR | - | Yaime Pérez (CUB); 61.35 m | - |
| 3 | Florence | Ivana Španović (SRB); 6.74 m | - | - | Anzhelika Sidorova (ANA); 4.91 m | - | Sandra Perković (CRO); 66.90 m | - |
| 4 | Oslo | Malaika Mihambo (GER); 6.86 m | - | - | - | - | - | Christin Hussong (GER); 62.62 m |
| 5 | Stockholm | Ivana Španović (SRB); 6.88 m | - | Yaroslava Mahuchikh (UKR); 2.03 m | - | Valerie Adams (NZL); 19.26 m | - | - |
| 6 | Monaco | - | Shanieka Ricketts (JAM); 14.75 m | - | Katie Nageotte (USA); 4.90 m | - | - | Barbora Špotáková (CZE); 63.08 m |
| 7 | Gateshead 2 | Maryna Bekh-Romanchuk (UKR); 6.77 m | - | - | Sandi Morris (USA); 4.76 m | - | - | - |
| 8 | Eugene | - | - | Iryna Gerashchenko (UKR); 1.98 m | Katie Nageotte (USA); 4.82 m | - | - | - |
| 9 | Lausanne | Ivana Španović (SRB); 6.85 m | Yulimar Rojas (VEN); 15.56 m DLR MR | Mariya Lasitskene (ANA); 1.98 m | - | - | - | - |
| 10 | Paris | - | - | Nicola McDermott (AUS); 1.98 m | - | - | Sandra Perković (CRO); 66.08 m | - |
| 11 | Brussels | - | - | Yaroslava Mahuchikh (UKR); 2.02 m | - | - | Yaime Pérez (CUB); 66.47 m | - |
| 12 | Zürich | Ivana Španović (SRB); 6.96 m | Yulimar Rojas (VEN); 15.48 m MR | Mariya Lasitskene (ANA); 2.05 m WL MR | Anzhelika Sidorova (ANA); 5.01 m WL DLR PB | Magdalyn Ewen (USA); 19.41 m SB | Valarie Allman (USA); 69.20 m | Christin Hussong (GER); 65.26 m |

== Diamond League Final ==
=== Men ===
100 m Men
| Rank | Lane/Order | Name | Nationality | Result | Reaction Time | Notes |
|---|---|---|---|---|---|---|
| 1st place, gold medalist(s) | 5 | Fred Kerley | United States | 9.87 | 0.134 | |
| 2nd place, silver medalist(s) | 6 | Andre De Grasse | Canada | 9.89 | 0.110 | =PB |
| 3rd place, bronze medalist(s) | 4 | Ronnie Baker | United States | 9.91 | 0.134 | |
| 4 | 7 | Trayvon Bromell | United States | 9.96 | 0.127 | |
| 5 | 8 | Akani Simbine | South Africa | 10.10 | 0.113 | |
| 6 | 2 | Rohan Browning | Australia | 10.18 | 0.127 | |
| 7 | 3 | Michael Rodgers | United States | 10.23 | 0.152 | |
| 8 | 9 | Silvan Wicki | Switzerland | 10.25 | 0.127 | |
| 9 | 1 | Yupun Abeykoon | Sri Lanka | 10.25 | 0.120 | |
200 m Men
| 1st place, gold medalist(s) | 7 | Kenneth Bednarek | United States | 19.70 | 0.165 | |
| 2nd place, silver medalist(s) | 6 | Andre De Grasse | Canada | 19.70 | 0.160 | |
| 3rd place, bronze medalist(s) | 5 | Fred Kerley | United States | 19.83 | 0.137 | |
| 4 | 8 | Aaron Brown | Canada | 20.13 | 0.147 | |
| 5 | 4 | Josephus Lyles | United States | 20.13 | 0.182 | |
| 6 | 3 | Isaac Makwala | Botswana | 20.31 | 0.167 | |
| 7 | 2 | Vernon Norwood | United States | 20.46 | 0.150 | |
| 8 | 1 | William Reais | Switzerland | 20.49 | 0.157 | |
400 m Men
| 1st place, gold medalist(s) | 4 | Michael Cherry | United States | 44.41 | 0.179 | |
| 2nd place, silver medalist(s) | 5 | Kirani James | Grenada | 44.42 | 0.154 | |
| 3rd place, bronze medalist(s) | 6 | Deon Lendore | Trinidad and Tobago | 44.81 | 0.187 | |
| 4 | 8 | Vernon Norwood | United States | 44.84 | 0.166 | |
| 5 | 3 | Liemarvin Bonevacia | Netherlands | 45.35 | 0.156 | |
| 6 | 7 | Isaac Makwala | Botswana | 45.41 | 0.198 | |
| 7 | 2 | Ricky Petrucciani | Switzerland | 46.38 | 0.165 | |
| 8 | 1 | Davide Re | Italy | 46.64 | 0.146 | |
110 m hurdles Men
| 1st place, gold medalist(s) | 4 | Devon Allen | United States | 13.06 | 0.115 | SB |
| 2nd place, silver medalist(s) | 7 | Ronald Levy | Jamaica | 13.06 | 0.128 | SB |
| 3rd place, bronze medalist(s) | 5 | Hansle Parchment | Jamaica | 13.17 | 0.132 | |
| 4 | 3 | Daniel Roberts | United States | 13.31 | 0.173 | |
| 5 | 2 | Paolo Dal Molin | Italy | 13.43 | 0.135 | |
| 6 | 8 | Finley Gaio | Switzerland | 13.72 | 0.135 | |
| 7 | 1 | Koen Smet | Netherlands | 13.77 | 0.132 | |
| | 6 | Jason Joseph | Switzerland | DQ | False Start | |
400 m hurdles Men
| 1st place, gold medalist(s) | 7 | Karsten Warholm | Norway | 47.35 | 0.150 | |
| 2nd place, silver medalist(s) | 6 | Alison dos Santos | Brazil | 47.81 | 0.181 | |
| 3rd place, bronze medalist(s) | 5 | Kyron McMaster | British Virgin Islands | 48.24 | 0.160 | |
| 4 | 3 | Rasmus Mägi | Estonia | 48.84 | 0.158 | |
| 5 | 8 | Constantin Preis | (Germany) | 49.08 | 0.259 | |
| 6 | 2 | Ramsey Angela | Netherlands | 49.39 | 0.167 | |
| 7 | 1 | Chris McAlister | (United Kingdom) Great Britain | 49.73 | 0.168 | |
| | 4 | Yasmani Copello | Turkey | DQ | False Start | |
800 m Men
| 1st place, gold medalist(s) | 7 | Emmanuel Korir | Kenya | 1:44.56 | | |
| 2nd place, silver medalist(s) | 6 | Ferguson Rotich | Kenya | 1:44.96 | | |
| 3rd place, bronze medalist(s) | 3 | Clayton Murphy | United States | 1:45.21 | | |
| 4 | 5 | Marco Arop | Canada | 1:45.23 | | |
| 5 | 4 | Elliot Giles | (United Kingdom) Great Britain | 1:45.25 | | |
| 6 | 1 | Isaiah Harris | United States | 1:45.70 | | |
| 7 | 8-1 | Amel Tuka | Bosnia and Herzegovina | 1:46.19 | | |
| 8 | 2 | Wyclife Kinyamal | Kenya | 1:46.52 | | |
| | 8-2 | Patryk Sieradzki | Poland | DNF | | Pacemaker |
1500 m Men
| 1st place, gold medalist(s) | 8 | Timothy Cheruiyot | Kenya | 3:31.37 | | |
| 2nd place, silver medalist(s) | 9 | Jakob Ingebrigtsen | Norway | 3:31.45 | | |
| 3rd place, bronze medalist(s) | 7 | Stewart McSweyn | Australia | 3:32.14 | | |
| 4 | 5 | Oliver Hoare | Australia | 3:32.66 | | PB |
| 5 | 6 | Mohamed Katir | Spain | 3:32.77 | | |
| 6 | 2 | Ronald Kwemoi | Kenya | 3:33.34 | | PB |
| 7 | 4 | Charles Cheboi Simotwo | Kenya | 3:34.24 | | |
| 8 | 3 | Ignacio Fontes | Spain | 3:34.45 | | |
| 9 | 1 | Birgin Bethwell | Kenya | 3:46.01 | | |
| | 10 | Erik Sowinski | United States | DNF | | Pacemaker |
3000 m steeplechase Men
| 1st place, gold medalist(s) | 8 | Benjamin Kigen | Kenya | 8:17.45 | | |
| 2nd place, silver medalist(s) | 9 | Soufiane El Bakkali | Morocco | 8:17.70 | | |
| 3rd place, bronze medalist(s) | 6 | Abraham Kibiwot | Kenya | 8:18.16 | | |
| 4 | 3 | Leonar Bett | Kenya | 8:20.20 | | |
| 5 | 7 | Getnet Wale | Ethiopia | 8:21.11 | | |
| 6 | 5 | Tadese Takele | Ethiopia | 8:21.68 | | |
| 7 | 2 | Hillary Bor | United States | 8:24.81 | | |
| 8 | 4 | Ahmed Abelwahled | Italy | 8:25.06 | | |
| 9 | 1 | Mohamed Tindouft | Morocco | 8:25.33 | | |
| | 10 | Wilberforce C. Kones | Kenya | DNF | | Pacemaker |
5000 m Men
| 1st place, gold medalist(s) | 9 | Berihu Aregawi | Ethiopia | 12:58.65 | | |
| 2nd place, silver medalist(s) | 5 | Birhanu Balew | Bahrain | 13:01.27 | | |
| 3rd place, bronze medalist(s) | 2 | Jacob Krop | Kenya | 13:01.81 | | |
| 4 | 1 | Nicholas Kipkorir Kimeli | Kenya | 13:02.43 | | |
| 5 | 7 | Yomif Kejelcha | Ethiopia | 13:04.29 | | |
| 6 | 8 | Michael Kibet | Kenya | 13:15.36 | | |
| 7 | 11 | Jonas Raess | Switzerland | 13:43.47 | | |
| 8 | 6 | Andrew Butchart | (United Kingdom) Great Britain | 14:03.13 | | |
| | 3 | Birgen Bethwell | Kenya | DNF | | Pacemaker |
| | 10 | Jerry Motsau | South Africa | DNF | | |
| | 4 | Matthew Ramsden | Australia | DNF | | Pacemaker |
Pole Vault Men
| 1st place, gold medalist(s) | 6 | Armand Duplantis | Sweden | 6.06 | | MR |
| 2nd place, silver medalist(s) | 4 | Sam Kendricks | United States | 5.93 | | SB |
| 3rd place, bronze medalist(s) | 1 | Timur Morgunov | Authorised Neutral Athletes | 5.93 | | SB |
| 4 | 3 | Ernest John Obiena | Philippines | 5.83 | | |
| 5 | 5 | Christopher Nilsen | United States | 5.83 | | |
| 6 | 2 | KC Lightfoot | United States | 5.83 | | |
High Jump Men
| 1st place, gold medalist(s) | 6 | Gianmarco Tamberi | Italy | 2.34 | | |
| 2nd place, silver medalist(s) | 3 | Andriy Protsenko | Ukraine | 2.30 | | =SB |
| 3rd place, bronze medalist(s) | 4 | Ilya Ivanyuk | Authorised Neutral Athletes | 2.30 | | |
| 4 | 5 | Maksim Nedasekau | Belarus | 2.27 | | |
| 5 | 2 | Django Lovett | Canada | 2.27 | | |
| 6 | 1 | Donald Thomas | Bahamas | 2.24 | | |
Long Jump Men
| 1st place, gold medalist(s) | 5 | Thobias Montler | Sweden | 8.17 | | |
| 2nd place, silver medalist(s) | 3 | Steffin McCarter | United States | 8.14 | | |
| 3rd place, bronze medalist(s) | 6 | Ruswahl Samaai | South Africa | 7.99 | | |
| 4 | 2 | Simon Ehammer | Switzerland | 7.94 | | |
| 5 | 4 | Benjamin Gföhler | Switzerland | 7.90 | | |
| 6 | 1 | Radek Juška | Czech Republic | 7.87 | | |
| 7 | 7 | Filippo Randazzo | Italy | 7.87 | | |
Triple Jump Men
| 1st place, gold medalist(s) | 6 | Pedro Pichardo | Portugal | 17.70 | | |
| 2nd place, silver medalist(s) | 5 | Hugues Fabrice Zango | Burkina Faso | 17.20 | | |
| 3rd place, bronze medalist(s) | 4 | Yasser Triki | Algeria | 17.03 | | |
| 4 | 1 | Tobia Bocchi | Italy | 16.71 | | |
| 5 | 2 | Tiago Pereira | Portugal | 16.61 | | |
| 6 | 3 | Donald Scott | United States | 16.22 | | |
Shot Put Men
| 1st place, gold medalist(s) | 6 | Ryan Crouser | United States | 22.67 | | MR |
| 2nd place, silver medalist(s) | 5 | Joe Kovacs | United States | 22.29 | | |
| 3rd place, bronze medalist(s) | 2 | Armin Sinancevic | Serbia | 21.86 | | |
| 4 | 4 | Tomas Walsh | New Zealand | 21.61 | | |
| 5 | 1 | Filip Mihaljevic | Croatia | 21.59 | | |
| 6 | 2 | Zane Weir | Italy | 20.85 | | |
Discus Men
| 1st place, gold medalist(s) | 6 | Daniel Ståhl | Sweden | 66.49 | | |
| 2nd place, silver medalist(s) | 3 | Kristjan Ceh | Slovenia | 65.39 | | |
| 3rd place, bronze medalist(s) | 1 | Fedrick Dacres | Jamaica | 65.33 | | |
| 4 | 2 | Andrius Gudžius | Lithuania | 64.04 | | |
| 5 | 5 | Simon Pettersson | Sweden | 63.68 | | |
| 6 | 4 | Lukas Weißhaidinger | Austria | 63.20 | | |
Javelin Men
| 1st place, gold medalist(s) | 6 | Johannes Vetter | Germany | 89.11 | | |
| 2nd place, silver medalist(s) | 4 | Julian Weber | Germany | 87.03 | | SB |
| 3rd place, bronze medalist(s) | 7 | Jakub Vadlejch | Czech Republic | 85.22 | | |
| 4 | 3 | Andrian Mardare | Moldova | 84.98 | | |
| 5 | 5 | Anderson Peters | Grenada | 81.65 | | |
| 6 | 1 | Simon Wieland | Switzerland | 78.11 | | SB |
| 7 | 2 | Gatis Cakšs | Latvia | 68.67 | | |

=== Women ===
100 m Women
| Rank | Lane/Order | Name | Nationality | Result | Reaction Time | Notes |
|---|---|---|---|---|---|---|
| 1st place, gold medalist(s) | 4 | Elaine Thompson-Herah | Jamaica | 10.65 | 0.139 | MR |
| 2nd place, silver medalist(s) | 3 | Dina Asher-Smith | (United Kingdom) Great Britain | 10.87 | 0.141 | SB |
| 3rd place, bronze medalist(s) | 6 | Ajla Del Ponte | Switzerland | 10.93 | 0.116 | |
| 4 | 8 | Daryll Neita | (United Kingdom) Great Britain | 10.93 | 0.117 | PB |
| 5 | 5 | Mujinga Kambundji | Switzerland | 10.94 | 0.126 | PB |
| 6 | 2 | Javianne Oliver | United States | 11.02 | 0.134 | |
| 7 | 1 | Natasha Morrison | Jamaica | 11.10 | 0.160 | |
| 8 | 7 | Marie-Josée Ta Lou | Ivory Coast | 11.22 | 0.157 | |
200 m Women
| 1st place, gold medalist(s) | 4 | Christine Mboma | Namibia | 21.78 | 0.216 | WU20R, Arkansas |
| 2nd place, silver medalist(s) | 6 | Shericka Jackson | Jamaica | 21.81 | 0.175 | PB |
| 3rd place, bronze medalist(s) | 7 | Dina Asher-Smith | (United Kingdom) Great Britain | 22.19 | 0.142 | |
| 4 | 5 | Mujinga Kambundji | Switzerland | 22.27 | 0.156 | |
| 5 | 1 | Daryll Neita | (United Kingdom) Great Britain | 22.81 | 0.145 | PB |
| 6 | 3 | Beth Dobbin | (United Kingdom) Great Britain | 22.88 | 0.152 | |
| 7 | 8 | Dezerea Bryant | United States | 22.99 | 0.146 | |
| 8 | 2 | Marije van Hunenstijn | Netherlands | 23.16 | 0.184 | |
400 m Women
| 1st place, gold medalist(s) | 7 | Quanera Hayes | United States | 49.88 | 0.188 | |
| 2nd place, silver medalist(s) | 5 | Marileidy Paulino | Dominican Republic | 49.96 | 0.179 | |
| 3rd place, bronze medalist(s) | 6 | Sada Williams | Barbados | 50.24 | 0.164 | |
| 4 | 4 | Stephenie Ann McPherson | Jamaica | 50.25 | 0.130 | |
| 5 | 8 | Candice McLeod | Jamaica | 50.96 | 0.152 | |
| 6 | 3 | Natalia Kaczmarek | Poland | 51.00 | 0.186 | |
| 7 | 1 | Lieke Klaver | Netherlands | 51.09 | 0.199 | |
| 8 | 2 | Kaylin Whitney | United States | 51.19 | 0.198 | |
100 m hurdles Women
| 1st place, gold medalist(s) | 3 | Tobi Amusan | Nigeria | 12.42 | 0.134 | AR, PB |
| 2nd place, silver medalist(s) | 4 | Nadine Visser | Netherlands | 12.51 | 0.141 | NR, PB |
| 3rd place, bronze medalist(s) | 5 | Meghan Tapper | Jamaica | 12.55 | 0.151 | |
| 4 | 7 | Payton Chadwick | United States | 12.62 | 0.132 | PB |
| 5 | 6 | Cindy Sember | (United Kingdom) Great Britain | 12.71 | 0.161 | |
| 6 | 2 | Gabbi Cunningham | United States | 12.79 | 0.140 | |
| 7 | 8 | Luca Kozák | Hungary | 12.90 | 0.187 | |
| 8 | 9 | Ditaji Kambundji | Switzerland | 13.01 | 0.142 | |
| 9 | 1 | Tejyrica Robinson | United States | 13.70 | 0.134 | |
400 m hurdles Women
| 1st place, gold medalist(s) | 4 | Femke Bol | Netherlands | 52.80 | 0.172 | MR |
| 2nd place, silver medalist(s) | 3 | Shamier Little | United States | 53.35 | 0.165 | |
| 3rd place, bronze medalist(s) | 5 | Anna Ryzhykova | Ukraine | 53.70 | 0.160 | |
| 4 | 7 | Viktoriya Tkachuk | Ukraine | 53.76 | 0.192 | PB |
| 5 | 2 | Gianna Woodruff | Panama | 54.50 | 0.192 | |
| 6 | 1 | Cara Nenya Hailey | United States | 55.06 | 0.183 | |
| 7 | 6 | Janieve Russell | Jamaica | 55.74 | 0.145 | |
| 8 | 8 | Léa Sprunger | Switzerland | 55.87 | 0.155 | |
800 m Women
| 1st place, gold medalist(s) | 7 | Keely Hodgkinson | (United Kingdom) Great Britain | 1:57.98 | | |
| 2nd place, silver medalist(s) | 4-1 | Kate Grace | United States | 1:58.34 | | |
| 3rd place, bronze medalist(s) | 5 | Natoya Goule | Jamaica | 1:58.34 | | |
| 4 | 3 | Jemma Reekie | (United Kingdom) Great Britain | 1:58.61 | | |
| 5 | 6 | Halimah Nakaayi | Uganda | 1:58.89 | | |
| 6 | 2 | Habitam Alemu | Ethiopia | 1:59.48 | | |
| 7 | 1 | Catriona Bisset | Australia | 1:59.66 | | |
| 8 | 8-1 | Lore Hoffmann | Switzerland | 2:00.25 | | |
| 9 | 4-2 | Lovisa Lindh | Sweden | 2:00.84 | | |
| | 8-2 | Noélie Yarigo | Benin | DNF | | Pacemaker |
1500 m Women
| 1st place, gold medalist(s) | 10 | Faith Kipyegon | Kenya | 3:58.33 | | |
| 2nd place, silver medalist(s) | 9 | Sifan Hassan | Netherlands | 3:58.55 | | |
| 3rd place, bronze medalist(s) | 5 | Josette Norris | United States | 4:00.41 | | |
| 4 | 6 | Marta Pérez | Spain | 4:01.94 | | |
| 5 | 2 | Helen Schlachtenhaufen | United States | 4:02.30 | | |
| 6 | 8 | Linden Hall | Australia | 4:03.50 | | |
| 7 | 3 | Axumawit Embaye | Ethiopia | 4:04.18 | | SB |
| 8 | 7 | Winnie Nanyondo | Uganda | 4:04.80 | | |
| 9 | 4 | Katie Snowden | (United Kingdom) Great Britain | 4:06.46 | | |
| 10 | 1 | Sarah Healy | Ireland | 4:18.60 | | |
| | 11 | Chanelle Price | United States | DNF | | Pacemaker |
3000 m steeplechase Women
| 1st place, gold medalist(s) | 4 | Norah Jeruto | Kenya | 9:07.33 | | |
| 2nd place, silver medalist(s) | 8 | Hyvin Kiyeng | Kenya | 9:08.55 | | |
| 3rd place, bronze medalist(s) | 9 | Courtney Frerichs | United States | 9:08.74 | | |
| 4 | 7 | Mekides Abebe | Ethiopia | 9:09.59 | | |
| 5 | 2 | Celliphine Chespol | Kenya | 9:10.26 | | |
| 6 | 5 | Winfred Yavi | Bahrain | 9:12.41 | | |
| 7 | 10 | Peruth Chemutai | Uganda | 9:20.16 | | |
| 8 | 1 | Rosefline Chepngetich | Kenya | 9:21.67 | | SB |
| 9 | 6 | Gesa Felicitas Krause | Germany | 9:32.69 | | |
| 10 | 3 | Purity Kirui | Kenya | 9:38.56 | | |
| | 11 | Fancy Cherono | Kenya | DNF | | Pacemaker |
5000 m Women
| 1st place, gold medalist(s) | 2 | Francine Niyonsaba | Burundi | 14:28.98 | | |
| 2nd place, silver medalist(s) | 3 | Hellen Obiri | Kenya | 14:29.68 | | |
| 3rd place, bronze medalist(s) | 1 | Ejgayehu Taye | Ethiopia | 14:30.30 | | |
| 4 | 8 | Margaret Chelimo Kipkemboi | Kenya | 14:31.18 | | |
| 5 | 11 | Eva Cherono | Kenya | 14:36.88 | | |
| 6 | 6 | Fantu Worku | Ethiopia | 14:43.60 | | |
| 7 | 5 | Lilian Kasait Rengeruk | Kenya | 14:50.75 | | |
| 8 | 9 | Karoline Grøvdal | Norway | 14:59.91 | | |
| 9 | 7 | Beatrice Chebet | Kenya | 15:11.27 | | |
| 10 | 10 | Elise Cranny | United States | 15:55.17 | | |
| | 4 | Kate van Buskirk | Canada | DNF | | Pacemaker |
Pole Vault Women
| 1st place, gold medalist(s) | 5 | Anzhelika Sidorova | Authorised Neutral Athletes | 5.01 | | WL, DLR, PB |
| 2nd place, silver medalist(s) | 3 | Katerina Stefanidi | Greece | 4.77 | | |
| 3rd place, bronze medalist(s) | 1 | Tina Šutej | Slovenia | 4.67 | | |
| 4 | 4 | Holly Bradshaw | (United Kingdom) Great Britain | 4.67 | | |
| 5 | 2 | Iryna Zhuk | Belarus | 4.47 | | |
| 6 | 6 | Katie Nageotte | United States | NM | | |
High Jump Women
| 1st place, gold medalist(s) | 6 | Mariya Lasitskene | Authorised Neutral Athletes | 2.05 | | WL, MR |
| 2nd place, silver medalist(s) | 4 | Yaroslava Mahuchikh | Ukraine | 2.03 | | =SB |
| 3rd place, bronze medalist(s) | 5 | Nicola McDermott | Australia | 2.01 | | |
| 4 | 3 | Iryna Gerashchenko | Ukraine | 1.96 | | |
| 5 | 1 | Kamila Lićwinko | Poland | 1.93 | | |
| 6 | 2 | Eleanor Patterson | Australia | 1.87 | | |
Triple Jump Women
| 1st place, gold medalist(s) | 6 | Yulimar Rojas | Venezuela | 15.48 | | MR |
| 2nd place, silver medalist(s) | 4 | Shanieka Ricketts | Jamaica | 14.64 | | |
| 3rd place, bronze medalist(s) | 3 | Kimberly Williams | Jamaica | 14.47 | | |
| 4 | 5 | Patrícia Mamona | Portugal | 14.33 | | |
| 5 | 1 | Thea Lafond | Dominica | 14.10 | | |
| 6 | 2 | Hanna Minenko | Israel | NM | | |
Long Jump Women
| 1st place, gold medalist(s) | 5 | Ivana Španovic | Serbia | 6.96 | | |
| 2nd place, silver medalist(s) | 2 | Khaddi Sagnia | Sweden | 6.83 | | |
| 3rd place, bronze medalist(s) | 4 | Maryna Bekh-Romanchuk | Ukraine | 6.75 | | |
| 4 | 3 | Jazmin Sawyers | (United Kingdom) Great Britain | 6.74 | | |
| 5 | 6 | Malaika Mihambo | Germany | 6.56 | | |
| 6 | 1 | Natassia Mironchyk-Ivanova | Belarus | 6.53 | | |
Shot Put Women
| 1st place, gold medalist(s) | 5 | Maggie Ewen | United States | 19.41 | | SB |
| 2nd place, silver medalist(s) | 6 | Auriol Dongmo | Portugal | 18.86 | | |
| 3rd place, bronze medalist(s) | 4 | Fanny Roos | Sweden | 18.75 | | |
| 4 | 3 | Chase Ealey | United States | 18.49 | | |
| 5 | 1 | Danniel Thomas-Dodd | Jamaica | 18.38 | | |
| 6 | 2 | Aliona Dubitskaya | Belarus | 18.34 | | |
Discus Women
| 1st place, gold medalist(s) | 6 | Valarie Allman | United States | 69.20 | | |
| 2nd place, silver medalist(s) | 4 | Sandra Perković | Croatia | 67.22 | | |
| 3rd place, bronze medalist(s) | 5 | Yaimé Pérez | Cuba | 64.83 | | |
| 4 | 2 | Denia Caballero | Cuba | 62.21 | | |
| 5 | 3 | Liliana Cá | Portugal | 61.92 | | |
| 6 | 1 | Marija Tolj | Croatia | 57.79 | | |
Javelin Women
| 1st place, gold medalist(s) | 4 | Christin Hussong | Germany | 65.26 | | |
| 2nd place, silver medalist(s) | 5 | Kelsey-Lee Barber | Australia | 62.68 | | |
| 3rd place, bronze medalist(s) | 2 | Nikola Ogrodníková | Czech Republic | 61.54 | | |
| 4 | 3 | Barbora Špotáková | Czech Republic | 61.43 | | |
| 5 | 1 | Lina Muze | Latvia | 60.18 | | |
| 6 | 6 | Maria Andrejczyk | Poland | 52.30 | | |
