= 2021 Athletissima =

- Dates: 25–26 August 2021
- Host city: Lausanne, Switzerland
- Venue: Stade Olympique de la Pontaise
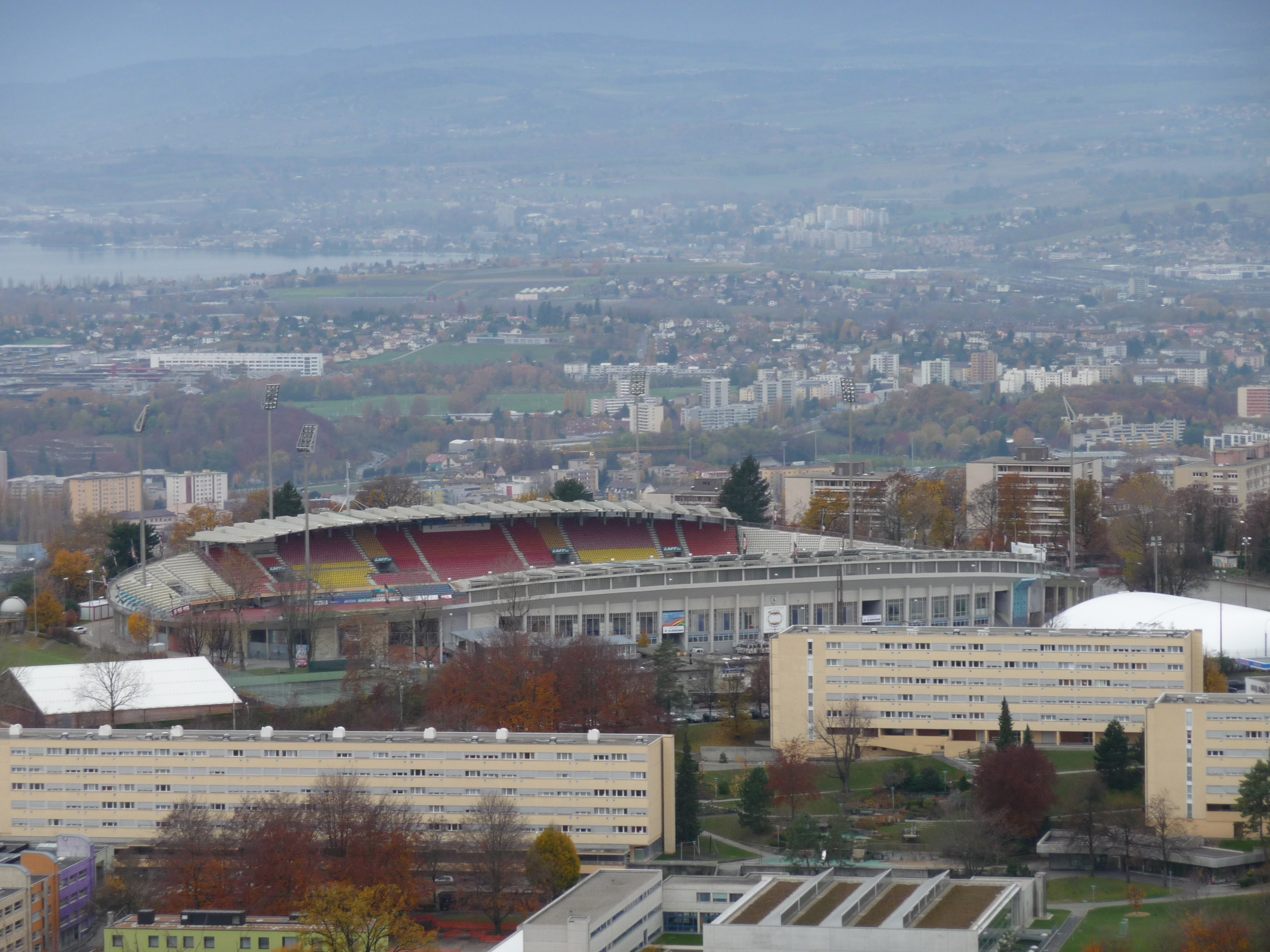
- Level: 2021 Diamond League
- Events: 30 (14 Diamond League)

The 2021 Athletissima was the 45th edition of the annual outdoor track and field meeting in Lausanne, Switzerland. It was held on the 25th and 26 August 2021 at the Stade Olympique de la Pontaise. The men's high jump event was held on the 25th of August in the city centre of Lausanne. 30 events were contested in total with 14 events being point-scoring Diamond League disciplines.

== Diamond League results ==
Athletes competing in the Diamond League disciplines earned points which counted towards qualification for the 2021 Diamond League final, to be held in Zurich from 8–9 September 2021. First place in an event earned eight points, with each succeeding place earning one less point than the previous, with no points being awarded for ninth place and lower.

The top-3 athletes in throwing and horizontal jumping events are ranked by the "Final 3" format, with their best mark overall in italics if it differs from their final trial.

=== Men ===
200 m (+3.2 m/s)
Place	Athlete	Time	Points
1st place, gold medalist(s)	Kenneth Bednarek (USA)	19.65	31 (+8)
2nd place, silver medalist(s)	Fred Kerley (USA)	19.77	7 (+7)
3rd place, bronze medalist(s)	Steven Gardiner (BAH)	20.11	6 (+6)
4	Aaron Brown (CAN)	20.18	30(+5)
5	Yancarlos Martínez (DOM)	20.30	4 (+4)
6	William Reais (SUI)	20.46	3 (+3)
7	Fausto Desalu (ITA)	20.56	7 (+2)
8	Isiah Young (USA)	DQ	0

800 m
Place	Athlete	Time	Points
1st place, gold medalist(s)	Marco Arop (CAN)	1:44.50	29 (+8)
2nd place, silver medalist(s)	Emmanuel Kipkurui Korir (KEN)	1:44.62	20 (+7)
3rd place, bronze medalist(s)	Ferguson Cheruiyot Rotich (KEN)	1:45.48	33 (+6)
4	Gabriel Tual (FRA)	1:45.70	5(+5)
5	Clayton Murphy (USA)	1:45.77	13 (+4)
6	Amel Tuka (BIH)	1:45.98	12 (+3)
7	Cornelius Tuwei (KEN)	1:46.53	2 (+2)
8	Adrián Ben (ESP)	1:46.74	10 (+1)
9	Peter Bol (AUS)	1:47.49	6
10	Patryk Dobek (POL)	1:50.60	3
—	Patryk Sieradzki (POL)	DNF	0

3000 m
Place	Athlete	Time	Points
1st place, gold medalist(s)	Jakob Ingebrigtsen (NOR)	7:33.06 SB	16 (+8)
2nd place, silver medalist(s)	Berihu Aregawi (ETH)	7:33.39 PB	11 (+7)
3rd place, bronze medalist(s)	Stewart McSweyn (AUS)	7:35.06	13 (+6)
4	Birhanu Balew (BHR)	7:36.94	12 (+5)
5	Selemon Barega (ETH)	7:37.62 SB	11 (+4)
6	Muktar Edris (ETH)	7:40.30	3 (+3)
7	Jacob Krop (KEN)	7:41.50	16 (+2)
8	Abel Kipsang (KEN)	7:42.21 PB	1 (+1)
9	Mohammed Ahmed (CAN)	7:42.53 SB	6
10	Grant Fisher (USA)	7:42.77	3
11	Nicholas Kipkorir Kimeli (KEN)	7:43.71	13
12	Bethwell Birgen (KEN)	7:54.27	0
13	Jonas Raess (SUI)	7:56.07 PB	4
—	Andrew Butchart (GBR)	DNF	9
—	Filip Ingebrigtsen (NOR)	DNF	4
—	Vincent Kibet (KEN)	DNF	0
—	Erik Sowinski (USA)	DNF	0
—	Getnet Wale (ETH)	DNF	0

110m hurdles (+2.9 m/s)
Place	Athlete	Time	Points
1st place, gold medalist(s)	Devon Allen (USA)	13.07	13 (+8)
2nd place, silver medalist(s)	Jason Joseph (SUI)	13.11	7 (+7)
3rd place, bronze medalist(s)	Pascal Martinot-Lagarde (FRA)	13.17	7 (+6)
4	Daniel Roberts (USA)	13.23	5 (+5)
5	Ronald Levy (JAM)	13.40	12 (+4)
6	Koen Smet (NED)	13.42	3 (+3)
7	Andrew Pozzi (GBR)	13.45	15 (+2)
8	Hansle Parchment (JAM)	13.58	1 (+1)

Pole Vault
Place	Athlete	Height	Points
1st place, gold medalist(s)	Christopher Nilsen (USA)	5.82 m	11 (+8)
2nd place, silver medalist(s)	Sam Kendricks (USA)	5.82 m	29 (+7)
3rd place, bronze medalist(s)	Timur Morgunov (ANA)	5.72 m	6 (+6)
4	Armand Duplantis (SWE)	5.62 m	28 (+5)
5	Ethan Cormont (FRA)	5.52 m	4 (+4)
5	KC Lightfoot (USA)	5.52 m	6 (+3)
5	Ernest John Obiena (PHI)	5.52 m	9 (+1)
8	Piotr Lisek (POL)	5.42 m	5 (+2)
9	Valentin Lavillenie (FRA)	5.42 m	5
10	Renaud Lavillenie (FRA)	5.32 m	12

Shot Put
Place	Athlete	Distance	Points
1st place, gold medalist(s)	Ryan Crouser (USA)	22.64 m / 22.81 m MR	16 (+8)
2nd place, silver medalist(s)	Tomas Walsh (NZL)	22.10 m	28 (+7)
3rd place, bronze medalist(s)	Filip Mihaljevic (CRO)	20.36 m / 21.37 m	18 (+6)
4	Armin Sinancevic (SRB)	21.35 m	18(+5)
5	Joe Kovacs (USA)	21.32 m	10 (+4)
6	Zane Weir (ITA)	21.20 m	9 (+3)
7	Tomáš Stanek (CZE)	21.05 m	5 (+3)
8	Darlan Romani (BRA)	21.00 m	8 (+2)
9	Payton Otterdahl (USA)	19.66 m	2

Javelin throw
Place	Athlete	Distance	Points
1st place, gold medalist(s)	Johannes Vetter (GER)	86.34 m / 88.54 m	16 (+8)
2nd place, silver medalist(s)	Jakub Vadlejch (CZE)	79.10 m / 85.73 m	12 (+7)
3rd place, bronze medalist(s)	Anderson Peters (GRN)	72.48 m / 84.32 m	15 (+6)
4	Andrian Mardare (MDA)	82.61 m	5(+5)
5	Vítezslav Veselý (CZE)	81.19 m	3 (+4)
6	Pavel Mialeshka (BLR)	81.18 m	3 (+3)
7	Aliaksei Katkavets (BLR)	80.76 m	2 (+2)
8	Gatis Cakšs (LAT)	75.57 m	8 (+1)
8	Alexandru Mihaita Novac (ROU)	72.81 m	0

=== Women ===
100 m (+1.7 m/s)
Place	Athlete	Time	Points
1st place, gold medalist(s)	Shelly-Ann Fraser-Pryce (JAM)	10.60 MR PB	28 (+8)
2nd place, silver medalist(s)	Elaine Thompson-Herah (JAM)	10.64	15 (+7)
3rd place, bronze medalist(s)	Shericka Jackson (JAM)	10.92	12 (+6)
4	Marie-Josée Ta Lou (CIV)	10.94	28(+5)
5	Daryll Neita (GBR)	10.96	11 (+4)
6	Ajla Del Ponte (SUI)	10.97	12 (+3)
7	Mujinga Kambundji (SUI)	11.01	4 (+2)
8	Alexandra Burghardt (GER)	11.12	1 (+1)

400 m
Place	Athlete	Time	Points
1st place, gold medalist(s)	Marileidy Paulino (DOM)	50.40	8 (+8)
2nd place, silver medalist(s)	Sada Williams (BAR)	50.77	10 (+7)
3rd place, bronze medalist(s)	Quanera Hayes (USA)	51.06	6 (+6)
4	Natalia Kaczmarek (POL)	51.10	10 (+5)
5	Candice McLeod (JAM)	51.26	4 (+4)
6	Lieke Klaver (NED)	51.73	15 (+3)
7	Jodie Williams (GBR)	52.12	9 (+2)
8	Rachel Pellaud (SUI)	53.52	1 (+1)

1500 m
Place	Athlete	Time	Points
1st place, gold medalist(s)	Freweyni Gebreezibeher (ETH)	4:02.24	14 (+8)
2nd place, silver medalist(s)	Linden Hall (AUS)	4:02.95	14 (+7)
3rd place, bronze medalist(s)	Josette Norris (USA)	4:03.27	12 (+6)
4	Marta Pérez (ESP)	4:03.79	10 (+5)
5	Jemma Reekie (GBR)	4:04.72 SB	4 (+4)
6	Hirut Meshesha (ETH)	4:05.28	3 (+3)
7	Hanna Klein (GER)	4:09.58	2 (+2)
8	Katie Snowden (GBR)	4:09.81	14 (+1)
9	Gaia Sabbatini (ITA)	4:10.61	4
10	Kristiina Mäki (CZE)	4:12.57	0
11	Caterina Granz (GER)	4:19.61	0
12	Sara Kuivisto (FIN)	4:20.68	0
—	Winny Chebet (KEN)	DNF	2
—	Chanelle Price (USA)	DNF	0

400m hurdles
Place	Athlete	Time	Points
1st place, gold medalist(s)	Femke Bol (NED)	53.05 MR	40 (+8)
2nd place, silver medalist(s)	Shamier Little (USA)	53.78	28 (+7)
3rd place, bronze medalist(s)	Anna Ryzhykova (UKR)	54.32	31 (+6)
4	Dalilah Muhammad (USA)	54.50	13 (+5)
5	Léa Sprunger (SUI)	54.75	11 (+4)
6	Janieve Russell (JAM)	54.89	18 (+3)
7	Leah Nugent (JAM)	56.41	10 (+2)
8	Viktoriya Tkachuk (UKR)	56.53	11 (+1)

High Jump
Place	Athlete	Height	Points
1st place, gold medalist(s)	Mariya Lasitskene (ANA)	1.98 m	13 (+8)
2nd place, silver medalist(s)	Yaroslava Mahuchikh (UKR)	1.98 m	15 (+7)
3rd place, bronze medalist(s)	Nicola McDermott (AUS)	1.95 m	13 (+6)
4	Iryna Gerashchenko (UKR)	1.92 m	18 (+5)
5	Kamila Lićwinko (POL)	1.89 m	22 (+4)
6	Mirela Demireva (BUL)	1.85 m	3 (+3)
6	Yuliya Levchenko (UKR)	1.85 m	8 (+3)
8	Eleanor Patterson (AUS)	1.85 m	7 (+1)
9	Inika McPherson (USA)	1.81 m	0

Long Jump
Place	Athlete	Distance	Points
1st place, gold medalist(s)	Ivana Španovic (SRB)	6.73 m (+0.8 m/s) / 6.85 m (+2.3 m/s)	31 (+8)
2nd place, silver medalist(s)	Khaddi Sagnia (SWE)	6.64 m (+1.3 m/s) / 6.92 m (+1.0 m/s) =PB	12 (+7)
3rd place, bronze medalist(s)	Jazmin Sawyers (GBR)	6.43 m (+1.5 m/s) / 6.66 m (−0.8 m/s)	20 (+6)
4	Chantel Malone (IVB)	6.64 m (+1.2 m/s)	10 (+5)
5	Maryna Bekh-Romanchuk (UKR)	6.54 m (+3.2 m/s)	24 (+4)
6	Nastassia Mironchyk-Ivanova (BLR)	6.48 m (+0.8 m/s)	12 (+3)
7	Abigail Irozuru (GBR)	6.40 m (+1.8 m/s)	9 (+2)
8	Daniela Schlatter (SUI)	6.01 m (+0.6 m/s)	1 (+1)
Best wind-legal performances
—	Ivana Španovic (SRB)	6.76 m (+1.9 m/s)	
—	Maryna Bekh-Romanchuk (UKR)	6.47 m (+1.8 m/s)	

Triple Jump
Place	Athlete	Distance	Points
1st place, gold medalist(s)	Yulimar Rojas (VEN)	15.11 m (+0.5 m/s) / 15.56 m (+3.5 m/s) DLR MR*	23 (+8)
2nd place, silver medalist(s)	Shanieka Ricketts (JAM)	14.52 m (+1.7 m/s) / 15.02 m (+2.7 m/s)	29 (+7)
3rd place, bronze medalist(s)	Hanna Minenko (ISR)	12.62 m (+1.8 m/s) / 14.47 m (+1.8 m/s)	6 (+6)
4	Kimberly Williams (JAM)	14.29 m (+1.8 m/s)	21 (+5)
5	Patrícia Mamona (POR)	14.21 m (+1.3 m/s)	17 (+4)
6	Thea LaFond (DMA)	14.14 m (+1.7 m/s)	8 (+3)
7	Liadagmis Povea (CUB)	14.06 m (+1.6 m/s)	2 (+2)
8	Kristiina Mäkelä (FIN)	13.93 m (+1.7 m/s)	1 (+1)
—	Senni Salminen (FIN)	NM	3
Best wind-legal performances
—	Yulimar Rojas (VEN)	15.52 m (+0.6 m/s)	
—	Shanieka Ricketts (JAM)	14.82 m (+1.7 m/s)	
