= 2024 Golden Gala =

- Dates: 30 August
- Host city: Rome, Italy
- Venue: Stadio Olimpico
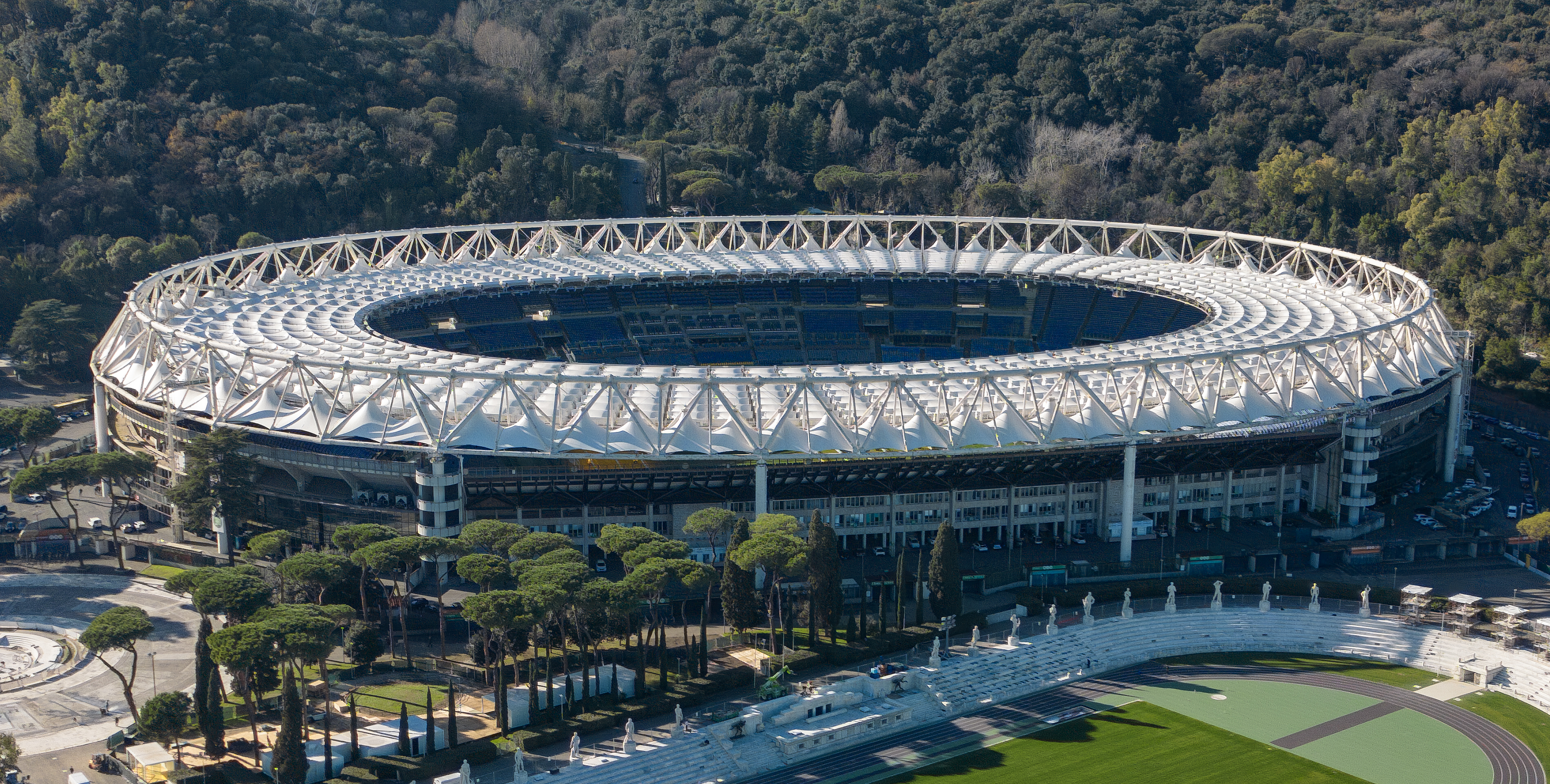
- Level: 2024 Diamond League

The 2024 Golden Gala was the 44th edition of the annual outdoor track and field meeting in Italy. Held on 30 August at the Stadio Olimpico in Rome, it was the thirteenth leg of the 2024 Diamond League – the highest level international track and field circuit.

== Results ==
Athletes competing in the Diamond League disciplines earned extra compensation and points which went towards qualifying for the Diamond League finals in Brussels. First place earned 8 points, with each step down in place earning one less point than the previous, until no points are awarded in 9th place or lower. In the case of a tie, each tying athlete earns the full amount of points for the place.

=== Diamond discipline ===
Men's 100 Metres (+0.3 m/s)
Rank	Athlete	Nation	Time	Points
1st place, gold medalist(s)	Letsile Tebogo	Botswana	9.87	8
2nd place, silver medalist(s)	Christian Coleman	United States	9.92	7
3rd place, bronze medalist(s)	Fred Kerley	United States	9.95	6
4	Ackeem Blake	Jamaica	10.03	5
5	Abdul Hakim Sani Brown	Japan	10.05	4
6	Kyree King	United States	10.07	3
7	Ferdinand Omanyala	Kenya	10.08	2
8	Jeremiah Azu	Great Britain	10.17	1
9	Marcell Jacobs	Italy	10.20	

Men's 400 Metres
Rank	Athlete	Nation	Time	Points
1st place, gold medalist(s)	Muzala Samukonga	Zambia	43.99	8
2nd place, silver medalist(s)	Kirani James	Grenada	44.30	7
3rd place, bronze medalist(s)	Jereem Richards	Trinidad and Tobago	44.55	6
4	Bayapo Ndori	Botswana	44.56	5
5	Vernon Norwood	United States	44.71	4
6	Charles Dobson	Great Britain	44.75	3
7	Bryce Deadmon	United States	44.77	2
8	Busang Kebinatshipi	Botswana	45.14	1
9	Luca Sito	Italy	45.25	

Men's 5000 Metres
Rank	Athlete	Nation	Time	Points
1st place, gold medalist(s)	Hagos Gebrhiwet	Ethiopia	12:51.07	8
2nd place, silver medalist(s)	Yomif Kejelcha	Ethiopia	12:51.25	7
3rd place, bronze medalist(s)	Selemon Barega	Ethiopia	12:51.39	6
4	Jacob Krop	Kenya	12:51.55	5
5	Telahun Bekele	Ethiopia	12:51.59	4
6	Berihu Aregawi	Ethiopia	12:54.12	3
7	Mohammed Ahmed	Canada	12:54.90	2
8	Dominic Lobalu	Switzerland	12:59.16	1
9	Nicholas Kipkorir	Kenya	13:07.80	
10	Mike Foppen	Netherlands	13:09.00	
11	Hugo Hay	France	13:09.38	
12	Endashaw Reta	Ethiopia	13:16.31	
13	Ronald Kwemoi	Kenya	13:19.95	
14	Morgan McDonald	Australia	13:20.52	
15	Boki Diriba	Ethiopia	13:21.50	
—	Nick Griggs	Ireland	DNF	
—	Melese Nberet	Ethiopia	DNF	
—	Wuholo Mulata	Ethiopia	DNF	

Men's High Jump
Rank	Athlete	Nation	Mark	Points
1st place, gold medalist(s)	Sanghyeok Woo	South Korea	2.30 m	8
2nd place, silver medalist(s)	Romaine Beckford	Jamaica	2.30 m	7
3rd place, bronze medalist(s)	Oleh Doroshchuk	Ukraine	2.27 m	6
3rd place, bronze medalist(s)	Gianmarco Tamberi	Italy	2.27 m	6
5	Edgar Rivera	Mexico	2.24 m	4
6	Jan Štefela	Czech Republic	2.20 m	3
7	Tihomir Ivanov	Bulgaria	2.20 m	2
8	Manuel Lando	Italy	2.15 m	1
8	Brian Raats	South Africa	2.15 m	1

Men's Triple Jump
Rank	Athlete	Nation	Mark	Points
1st place, gold medalist(s)	Andy Díaz	Italy	17.32 m (+0.8 m/s)	8
2nd place, silver medalist(s)	Max Heß	Germany	17.01 m (−0.2 m/s)	7
3rd place, bronze medalist(s)	Almir dos Santos	Brazil	16.89 m (+1.6 m/s)	6
4	Hugues Fabrice Zango	Burkina Faso	16.87 m (+0.7 m/s)	5
5	Lázaro Martínez	Cuba	16.69 m (±0.0 m/s)	4
6	Tiago Pereira	Portugal	16.65 m (+0.5 m/s)	3
7	Jean-Marc Pontvianne	France	16.37 m (+0.7 m/s)	2
8	Andrea Dallavalle	Italy	16.18 m (+0.3 m/s)	1

Men's Shot Put
Rank	Athlete	Nation	Mark	Points
1st place, gold medalist(s)	Ryan Crouser	United States	22.49 m	8
2nd place, silver medalist(s)	Leonardo Fabbri	Italy	21.70 m	7
3rd place, bronze medalist(s)	Payton Otterdahl	United States	21.63 m	6
4	Joe Kovacs	United States	21.62 m	5
5	Rajindra Campbell	Jamaica	21.52 m	4
6	Chukwuebuka Enekwechi	Nigeria	21.00 m	3
7	Tomáš Staněk	Czech Republic	20.56 m	2
8	Zane Weir	Italy	19.99 m	1
9	Kyle Blignaut	South Africa	19.43 m	

Men's Discus Throw
Rank	Athlete	Nation	Mark	Points
1st place, gold medalist(s)	Kristjan Čeh	Slovenia	68.61 m	8
2nd place, silver medalist(s)	Roje Stona	Jamaica	67.85 m	7
3rd place, bronze medalist(s)	Mykolas Alekna	Lithuania	67.68 m	6
4	Matthew Denny	Australia	66.44 m	5
5	Daniel Ståhl	Sweden	65.04 m	4
6	Henrik Janssen	Germany	64.11 m	3
7	Clemens Prüfer	Germany	64.09 m	2
8	Lukas Weißhaidinger	Austria	63.33 m	1
9	Alessio Mannucci	Italy	59.94 m	

Women's 200 Metres (+0.4 m/s)
Rank	Athlete	Nation	Time	Points
1st place, gold medalist(s)	Brittany Brown	United States	22.00	8
2nd place, silver medalist(s)	Anavia Battle	United States	22.27	7
3rd place, bronze medalist(s)	Daryll Neita	Great Britain	22.46	6
4	Jessica Gbai	Ivory Coast	22.51	5
5	Mujinga Kambundji	Switzerland	22.53	4
6	Jenna Prandini	United States	22.67	3
7	Maboundou Koné	Ivory Coast	22.84	2
8	Amy Hunt	Great Britain	23.14	1
9	Dalia Kaddari	Italy	23.33	

Women's 1500 Metres
Rank	Athlete	Nation	Time	Points
1st place, gold medalist(s)	Faith Kipyegon	Kenya	3:52.89	8
2nd place, silver medalist(s)	Freweyni Hailu	Ethiopia	3:54.16	7
3rd place, bronze medalist(s)	Birke Haylom	Ethiopia	3:54.79	6
4	Jessica Hull	Australia	3:54.98	5
5	Nelly Chepchirchir	Kenya	3:56.14	4
6	Sintayehu Vissa	Italy	3:58.12	3
7	Worknesh Mesele	Ethiopia	3:58.15	2
8	Sarah Healy	Ireland	3:58.42	1
9	Revée Walcott-Nolan	Great Britain	3:58.68	
10	Linden Hall	Australia	3:58.84	
11	Nadia Battocletti	Italy	3:59.19	
12	Nozomi Tanaka	Japan	3:59.69	
13	Nigist Getachew	Ethiopia	4:01.69	
14	Ludovica Cavalli	Italy	4:02.60	
15	Marta Pérez	Spain	4:02.80	
—	Winnie Nanyondo	Uganda	DNF	

Women's 100 Metres Hurdles(−0.4 m/s)
Rank	Athlete	Nation	Time	Points
1st place, gold medalist(s)	Ackera Nugent	Jamaica	12.24	8
2nd place, silver medalist(s)	Masai Russell	United States	12.31	7
3rd place, bronze medalist(s)	Nadine Visser	Netherlands	12.52	6
4	Cyréna Samba-Mayela	France	12.57	5
5	Alaysha Johnson	United States	12.66	4
6	Kendra Harrison	United States	12.70	3
7	Ditaji Kambundji	Switzerland	12.78	2
8	Giada Carmassi	Italy	13.20	1
—	Devynne Charlton	Bahamas	DNF	

Women's 400 Metres Hurdles
Rank	Athlete	Nation	Time	Points
1st place, gold medalist(s)	Anna Cockrell	United States	52.59	8
2nd place, silver medalist(s)	Shiann Salmon	Jamaica	53.20	7
3rd place, bronze medalist(s)	Shamier Little	United States	54.15	6
4	Janieve Russell	Jamaica	54.46	5
5	Andrenette Knight	Jamaica	54.90	4
6	Ayomide Folorunso	Italy	55.00	3
7	Louise Maraval	France	55.16	2
8	Lina Nielsen	Great Britain	55.93	1
9	Anna Ryzhykova	Ukraine	56.96	

Women's 3000 Metres Steeplechase
Rank	Athlete	Nation	Time	Points
1st place, gold medalist(s)	Winfred Yavi	Bahrain	8:44.39	8
2nd place, silver medalist(s)	Peruth Chemutai	Uganda	8:48.03	7
3rd place, bronze medalist(s)	Faith Cherotich	Kenya	8:57.65	6
4	Valerie Constien	United States	9:04.92	5
5	Marwa Bouzayani	Tunisia	9:04.93	4
6	Gabrielle Jennings	United States	9:07.70	3
7	Noah Jeruto	Kazakhstan	9:10.43	2
8	Lea Meyer	Germany	9:11.37	1
9	Courtney Wayment	United States	9:14.46	
10	Olivia Gürth	Germany	9:15.17	
11	Irene Sánchez-Escribano	Spain	9:18.78	
12	Kinga Królik	Poland	9:26.78	
13	Ilona Mononen	Finland	9:32.61	
14	Aneta Konieczek	Poland	9:48.03	
—	Agnieszka Chorzępa	Poland	DNF	
—	Lomi Muleta	Ethiopia	DNF	

Women's Pole Vault
Rank	Athlete	Nation	Mark	Points
1st place, gold medalist(s)	Nina Kennedy	Australia	4.83 m	8
2nd place, silver medalist(s)	Sandi Morris	United States	4.83 m	7
3rd place, bronze medalist(s)	Alysha Newman	Canada	4.73 m	6
4	Eliza McCartney	New Zealand	4.63 m	5
5	Amálie Švábíková	Czech Republic	4.63 m	4
6	Roberta Bruni	Italy	4.53 m	3
7	Tina Šutej	Slovenia	4.43 m	2
8	Angelica Moser	Switzerland	4.43 m	1
9	Elisa Molinarolo	Italy	4.23 m	

Women's Long Jump
Rank	Athlete	Nation	Mark	Points
1st place, gold medalist(s)	Tara Davis-Woodhall	United States	7.02 m (+0.1 m/s)	8
2nd place, silver medalist(s)	Monae' Nichols	United States	6.82 m (±0.0 m/s)	7
3rd place, bronze medalist(s)	Quanesha Burks	United States	6.66 m (−0.3 m/s)	6
4	Jasmine Moore	United States	6.62 m (+0.2 m/s)	5
5	Fátima Diame	Spain	6.56 m (−0.1 m/s)	4
6	Marthe Koala	Burkina Faso	6.55 m (−0.2 m/s)	3
7	Milica Gardašević	Serbia	6.38 m (−0.2 m/s)	2
8	Sumire Hata	Japan	6.36 m (−0.3 m/s)	1
9	Alina Rotaru-Kottmann	Romania	6.28 m (−0.1 m/s)	

=== Promotional events ===
Men's 110 Metres Hurdles (+0.4 m/s)
Rank	Athlete	Nation	Time
1st place, gold medalist(s)	Sasha Zhoya	France	13.18
2nd place, silver medalist(s)	Asier Martínez	Spain	13.27
3rd place, bronze medalist(s)	Omar McLeod	Jamaica	13.28
4	Eric Edwards Jr.	United States	13.29
5	Orlando Bennett	Jamaica	13.33
6	Lorenzo Simonelli	Italy	13.34 (.334)
7	Cordell Tinch	United States	13.34 (.340)
8	Dylan Beard	United States	13.35
9	Hassane Fofana	Italy	13.84

=== National events ===
Women's 100 Metres (−0.1 m/s)
Rank	Athlete	Nation	Time
1st place, gold medalist(s)	Daniela Lai	Italy	12.45
2nd place, silver medalist(s)	Serena Caravelli	Italy	12.78
3rd place, bronze medalist(s)	Michela Tavelli	Italy	13.12
4	Cristina Sanulli	Italy	13.23
5	Michela Borscia	Italy	13.43
6	Miriam di Iorio	Italy	13.66
7	Maria Ruggeri	Italy	13.71
8	Viviana Viviani	Italy	13.89
9	Marta Manfrin	Italy	14.15
