= 2023 Golden Gala =

- Dates: 2 June
- Host city: Florence, Italy
- Venue: Stadio Luigi Ridolfi
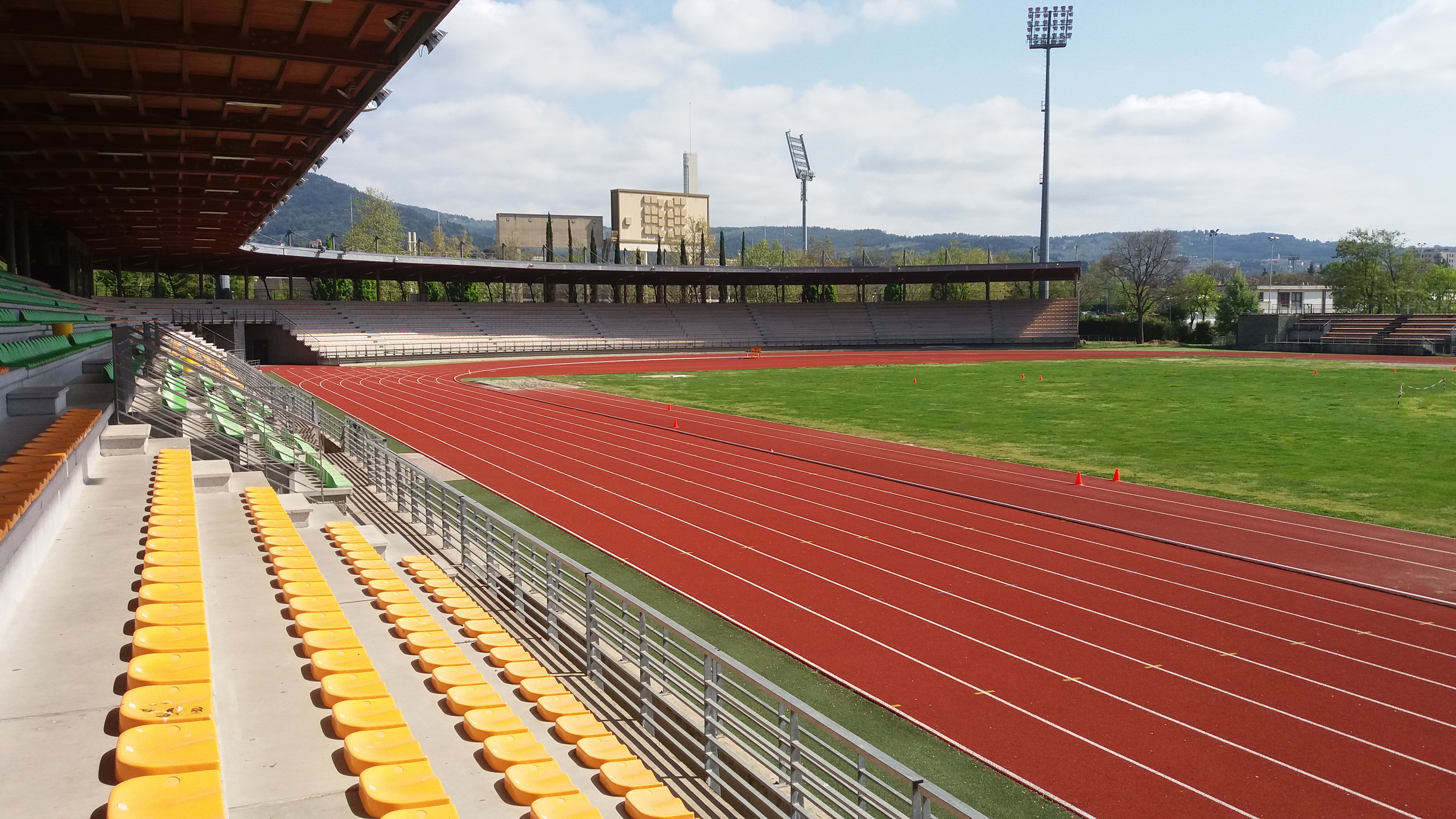
- Level: 2023 Diamond League

The 2023 Golden Gala was the 43rd edition of the annual outdoor track and field meeting in Italy. Held on 2 June at the Stadio Luigi Ridolfi in Florence, it was the third leg of the 2023 Diamond League – the highest level international track and field circuit.

The highlight of the meeting was Faith Kipyegon running 3:49.11 to break the world record in the 1500 m, beating Genzebe Dibaba's mark from 2015. She ran the race in a negative split, covering her first 800 metres in 2:04.1 but her last 800 m in 2:00.6. Kipyegon also became the only woman in history to run under 3:50.

== Results ==
Athletes competing in the Diamond League disciplines earned extra compensation and points which went towards qualifying for the Diamond League finals in Zürich. First place earned 8 points, with each step down in place earning one less point than the previous, until no points are awarded in 9th place or lower.

=== Diamond Discipline ===
Men's 100m (±0.0 m/s)
Place	Athlete	Country	Time	Points
1st place, gold medalist(s)	Fred Kerley	United States	9.94	8
2nd place, silver medalist(s)	Ferdinand Omanyala	Kenya	10.05	7
3rd place, bronze medalist(s)	Trayvon Bromell	United States	10.09	6
4	Akani Simbine	South Africa	10.09	5
5	Samuele Ceccarelli	Italy	10.13	4
6	Rohan Browning	Australia	10.15	3
7	Yohan Blake	Jamaica	10.15	2
	Marvin Bracy	United States	~~10.23~~ DSQ	~~1~~

Men's 200m (±0.0 m/s)
Place	Athlete	Country	Time	Points
1st place, gold medalist(s)	Erriyon Knighton	United States	19.89	8
2nd place, silver medalist(s)	Jereem Richards	Trinidad and Tobago	20.28	7
3rd place, bronze medalist(s)	Aaron Brown	Canada	20.31	6
4	Filippo Tortu	Italy	20.41	5
5	Reynier Mena	Cuba	20.48	4
6	Joseph Fahnbulleh	Liberia	20.51	3
7	Fausto Desalu	Italy	20.90	2
	Alexander Ogando	Dominican Republic	DQ	

Men's 5000m
Place	Athlete	Country	Time	Points
1st place, gold medalist(s)	Mohamed Katir	Spain	12:52.09	8
2nd place, silver medalist(s)	Yomif Kejelcha	Ethiopia	12:52.12	7
3rd place, bronze medalist(s)	Luis Grijalva	Guatemala	12:52.97	6
4	Joshua Cheptegei	Uganda	12:53.81	5
5	Telahun Haile Bekele	Ethiopia	12:54.31	4
6	Woody Kincaid	United States	12:54.40	3
7	Joe Klecker	United States	12:55.16	2
8	Jacob Krop	Kenya	12:55.57	1
9	Selemon Barega	Ethiopia	12:56.18	
10	Mohammed Ahmed	Canada	12:56.46	
11	Grant Fisher	United States	12:56.99	
12	Samuel Tefera	Ethiopia	12:58.44	
13	Thierry Ndikumwenayo	Spain	12:59.03	
14	Berihu Aregawi	Ethiopia	13:04.52	
15	Nicholas Kimeli	Kenya	13:10.52	
16	Stewart McSweyn	Australia	13:23.81	
	Paul Robinson	Ireland	DNF	
	Jack Rayner	Australia	DNF	
	Andreas Almgren	Sweden	DNF	

Men's 110mH (−0.2 m/s)
Place	Athlete	Country	Time	Points
1st place, gold medalist(s)	Grant Holloway	United States	13.04	8
2nd place, silver medalist(s)	Jason Joseph	Switzerland	13.10	7
3rd place, bronze medalist(s)	Devon Allen	United States	13.19	6
4	Jamal Britt	United States	13.26	5
5	Just Kwaou-Mathey	France	13.35	4
6	Freddie Crittenden	United States	13.38	3
7	Rafael Pereira	Brazil	13.47	2
8	Lorenzo Simonelli	Italy	13.57	1

Men's High Jump
Place	Athlete	Country	Mark	Points
1st place, gold medalist(s)	JuVaughn Harrison	United States	2.32 m	8
2nd place, silver medalist(s)	Woo Sang-hyeok	South Korea	2.30 m	7
3rd place, bronze medalist(s)	Luis Zayas	Cuba	2.27 m	6
4	Hamish Kerr	New Zealand	2.24 m	5
5	Douwe Amels	Netherlands	2.20 m	4
6	Edgar Rivera	Mexico	2.15 m	3
7	Tobias Potye	Germany	2.15 m	2
8	Andriy Protsenko	Ukraine	2.15 m	1
9	Luis Castro	Puerto Rico	2.10 m	

Men's Triple Jump
Place	Athlete	Country	Mark	Points
1st place, gold medalist(s)	Andy Díaz	Italy	17.75 m (+0.9 m/s)	8
2nd place, silver medalist(s)	Hugues Fabrice Zango	Burkina Faso	17.68 m (−0.1 m/s)	7
3rd place, bronze medalist(s)	Lázaro Martínez	Cuba	17.12 m (+0.5 m/s)	6
4	Emmanuel Ihemeje	Italy	16.69 m (−0.6 m/s)	5
5	Donald Scott	United States	16.46 m (+1.1 m/s)	4
6	Abdulla Aboobacker	India	16.37 m (±0.0 m/s)	3
7	Christian Taylor	United States	16.32 m (+1.1 m/s)	2
8	Tobia Bocchi	Italy	16.24 m (−0.9 m/s)	1

Men's Shot Put
Place	Athlete	Country	Mark	Points
1st place, gold medalist(s)	Leonardo Fabbri	Italy	21.73 m	8
2nd place, silver medalist(s)	Tom Walsh	New Zealand	21.69 m	7
3rd place, bronze medalist(s)	Tomáš Staněk	Czech Republic	21.64 m	6
4	Joe Kovacs	United States	21.55 m	5
5	Adrian Piperi	United States	21.43 m	4
6	Zane Weir	Italy	21.13 m	3
7	Filip Mihaljević	Croatia	20.92 m	2
8	Josh Awotunde	United States	20.12 m	1
9	Armin Sinančević	Serbia	19.53 m	

Women's 100m (−0.4 m/s)
Place	Athlete	Country	Time	Points
1st place, gold medalist(s)	Marie-Josée Ta Lou	Ivory Coast	10.97	8
2nd place, silver medalist(s)	Gina Lückenkemper	Germany	11.09	7
3rd place, bronze medalist(s)	Imani-Lara Lansiquot	Great Britain	11.16	6
4	Morolake Akinosun	United States	11.20	5
5	Abby Steiner	United States	11.23	4
6	Gabrielle Thomas	United States	11.27	3
7	Jenna Prandini	United States	11.33	2
	Dina Asher-Smith	Great Britain	DNS	

Women's 400m
Place	Athlete	Country	Time	Points
1st place, gold medalist(s)	Natalia Kaczmarek	Poland	50.41	8
2nd place, silver medalist(s)	Lieke Klaver	Netherlands	50.75	7
3rd place, bronze medalist(s)	Lynna Irby	United States	50.84	6
4	Roxana Gómez	Cuba	51.29	5
5	Aliyah Abrams	Guyana	51.31	4
6	Anna Kiełbasińska	Poland	51.76	3
7	Candice McLeod	Jamaica	52.09	2
8	Alice Mangione	Italy	52.61	1

Women's 1500m
Place	Athlete	Country	Time	Points
1st place, gold medalist(s)	Faith Kipyegon	Kenya	3:49.11	8
2nd place, silver medalist(s)	Laura Muir	Great Britain	3:57.09	7
3rd place, bronze medalist(s)	Jessica Hull	Australia	3:57.29	6
4	Ciara Mageean	Ireland	4:00.95	5
5	Axumawit Embaye	Ethiopia	4:00.98	4
6	Abbey Caldwell	Australia	4:01.34	3
7	Josette Andrews	United States	4:01.39	2
8	Cory McGee	United States	4:01.45	1
9	Sintayehu Vissa	Italy	4:01.98	
10	Linden Hall	Australia	4:02.43	
11	Ludovica Cavalli	Italy	4:03.04	
12	Gabriela DeBues-Stafford	Canada	4:03.64	
13	Federica Del Buono	Italy	4:05.09	
14	Marta García	Spain	4:07.22	
	Sage Hurta	United States	DNF	
	Brooke Feldmeier	United States	DNF	

Women's 400mH
Place	Athlete	Country	Time	Points
1st place, gold medalist(s)	Femke Bol	Netherlands	52.43	8
2nd place, silver medalist(s)	Shamier Little	United States	53.38	7
3rd place, bronze medalist(s)	Anna Hall	United States	54.42	6
4	Gianna Woodruff	Panama	54.59	5
5	Viktoriya Tkachuk	Ukraine	54.71	4
6	Rushell Clayton	Jamaica	54.71	3
7	Ayomide Folorunso	Italy	55.34	2
8	Anna Ryzhykova	Ukraine	55.99	1

Women's 3000mSC
Place	Athlete	Country	Time	Points
1st place, gold medalist(s)	Sembo Almayew	Ethiopia	9:00.71	8
2nd place, silver medalist(s)	Jackline Chepkoech	Kenya	9:04.07	7
3rd place, bronze medalist(s)	Zerfe Wondemagegn	Ethiopia	9:04.61	6
4	Beatrice Chepkoech	Kenya	9:10.02	5
5	Alice Finot	France	9:10.04	4
6	Maruša Mišmaš-Zrimšek	Slovenia	9:10.07	3
7	Mekides Abebe	Ethiopia	9:11.09	2
8	Courtney Wayment	United States	9:11.41	1
9	Marwa Bouzayani	Tunisia	9:11.76	
10	Luiza Gega	Albania	9:11.94	
11	Winfred Yavi	Bahrain	9:18.12	
12	Emma Coburn	United States	9:18.17	
13	Regan Yee	Canada	9:40.04	
14	Nataliya Strebkova	Ukraine	9:43.20	
	Fancy Cherono	Kenya	DNF	

Women's Pole Vault
Place	Athlete	Country	Mark	Points
1st place, gold medalist(s)	Katie Moon	United States	4.71 m	8
2nd place, silver medalist(s)	Tina Šutej	Slovenia	4.71 m	7
3rd place, bronze medalist(s)	Nina Kennedy	Australia	4.61 m	6
4	Roberta Bruni	Italy	4.61 m	5
5	Sandi Morris	United States	4.61 m	4
6	Wilma Murto	Finland	4.51 m	3
7	Lene Retzius	Norway	4.51 m	2
8	Elisa Molinarolo	Italy	4.41 m	1
9	Katerina Stefanidi	Greece	4.41 m	

Women's Long Jump
Place	Athlete	Country	Mark	Points
1st place, gold medalist(s)	Larissa Iapichino	Italy	6.79 m (+0.7 m/s)	8
2nd place, silver medalist(s)	Tara Davis-Woodhall	United States	6.74 m (−0.5 m/s)	7
3rd place, bronze medalist(s)	Maryna Bekh-Romanchuk	Ukraine	6.59 m (−0.2 m/s)	6
4	Ese Brume	Nigeria	6.58 m (−0.5 m/s)	5
5	Malaika Mihambo	Germany	6.57 m (−0.4 m/s)	4
6	Jazmin Sawyers	Great Britain	6.43 m (+0.3 m/s)	3
7	Ivana Španović	Serbia	6.42 m (−0.1 m/s)	2
8	Quanesha Burks	United States	6.33 m (+0.5 m/s)	1
9	Khaddi Sagnia	Sweden	6.32 m (±0.0 m/s)	

Women's Discus Throw
Place	Athlete	Country	Mark	Points
1st place, gold medalist(s)	Valarie Allman	United States	65.96 m	8
2nd place, silver medalist(s)	Feng Bin	China	65.91 m	7
3rd place, bronze medalist(s)	Shanice Craft	Germany	64.47 m	6
4	Liliana Cá	Portugal	63.69 m	5
5	Mélina Robert-Michon	France	63.20 m	4
6	Jorinde van Klinken	Netherlands	62.13 m	3
7	Daisy Osakue	Italy	61.55 m	2
8	Izabela da Silva	Brazil	60.81 m	1
9	Laulauga Tausaga	United States	55.34 m	

== See also ==
- 2023 Diamond League
