= 2022 Golden Gala =

- Dates: 9 June
- Host city: Rome, Italy
- Venue: Stadio Olimpico
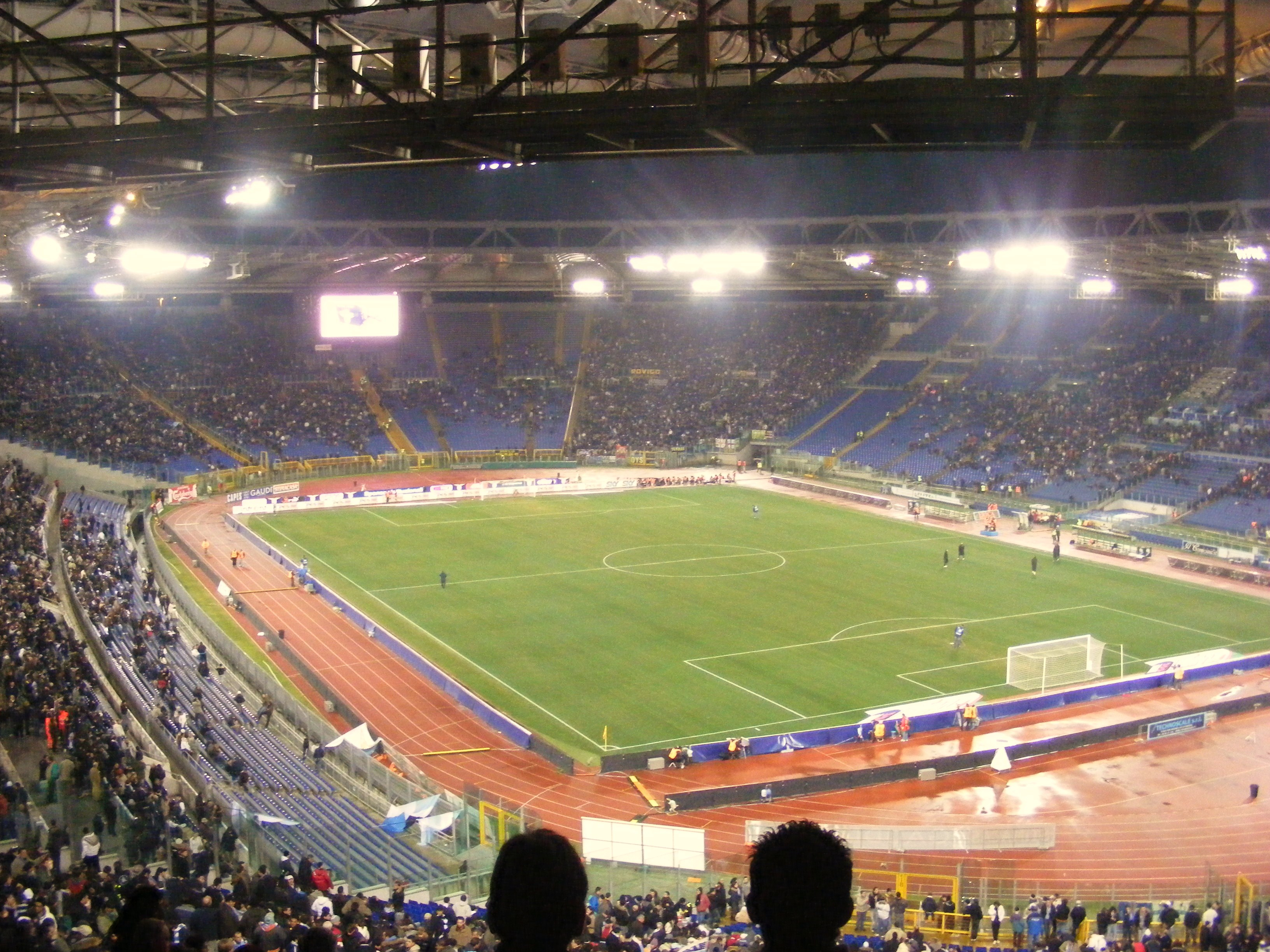
- Level: 2022 Diamond League

The 2022 Golden Gala was the 42nd edition of the annual outdoor track and field meeting in Rome, Italy. Held on 9 June at the Stadio Olimpico, it was the fifth leg of the 2022 Diamond League – the highest level international track and field circuit.

The meeting was highlighted by Shericka Jackson upsetting Olympic champion Elaine Thompson-Herah in the 200 m, and Nicholas Kimeli's 5000 metres win in a rare sub-12:50 time.

== Results ==
Athletes competing in the Diamond League disciplines earned extra compensation and points which went towards qualifying for the Diamond League finals in Zürich. First place earned 8 points, with each step down in place earning one less point than the previous, until no points are awarded in 9th place or lower.

=== Diamond Discipline ===
Men's 100m (−0.2 m/s)
Place	Athlete	Country	Time	Points
1st place, gold medalist(s)	Fred Kerley	United States	9.92	8
2nd place, silver medalist(s)	Kyree King	United States	10.14	7
3rd place, bronze medalist(s)	Cravont Charleston	United States	10.17	6
4	Nigel Ellis	Jamaica	10.17	5
5	Emile Erasmus	South Africa	10.22	4
6	Chituru Ali	Italy	10.25	3
7	Mike Rodgers	United States	10.29	2
8	Isiah Young	United States	10.35	1
9	Lucas Ansah-Peprah	Germany	10.39	

Men's 400m
Place	Athlete	Country	Time	Points
1st place, gold medalist(s)	Kirani James	Grenada	44.54	8
2nd place, silver medalist(s)	Vernon Norwood	United States	44.81	7
3rd place, bronze medalist(s)	Michael Cherry	United States	45.24	6
4	Lidio Andrés Feliz	Dominican Republic	45.46	5
5	Christopher Taylor	Jamaica	45.47	4
6	Liemarvin Bonevacia	Netherlands	45.79	3
7	Edoardo Scotti	Italy	45.89	2
8	Isaac Makwala	Botswana	45.90	1
9	Ricky Petrucciani	Switzerland	46.16	

Men's 5000m
Place	Athlete	Country	Time	Points
1st place, gold medalist(s)	Nicholas Kimeli	Kenya	12:46.33	8
2nd place, silver medalist(s)	Jacob Krop	Kenya	12:46.79	7
3rd place, bronze medalist(s)	Yomif Kejelcha	Ethiopia	12:52.10	6
4	Selemon Barega	Ethiopia	12:54.87	5
5	Mohammed Ahmed	Canada	12:55.84	4
6	Telahun Haile Bekele	Ethiopia	12:57.18	3
7	Muktar Edris	Ethiopia	12:58.63	2
8	Thierry Ndikumwenayo	Burundi	12:59.39	1
9	Levy Kibet	Kenya	13:01.32	
10	Milkesa Mengesha	Ethiopia	13:02.42	
11	Yemaneberhan Crippa	Italy	13:04.95	
12	Jonas Raess	Switzerland	13:35.29	
13	Pietro Riva	Italy	13:51.94	
14	Ossama Meslek	Italy	13:54.57	
	Jack Rayner	Australia	DNF	
	Paul Robinson	Ireland	DNF	

Men's 3000mSC
Place	Athlete	Country	Time	Points
1st place, gold medalist(s)	Lamecha Girma	Ethiopia	7:59.23	8
2nd place, silver medalist(s)	Abraham Kibiwot	Kenya	8:06.73	7
3rd place, bronze medalist(s)	Getnet Wale	Ethiopia	8:06.74	6
4	Conseslus Kipruto	Kenya	8:08.76	5
5	Amos Serem	Kenya	8:09.93	4
6	Ahmed Abdelwahed	Italy	8:10.29	3
7	Osama Zoghlami	Italy	8:11.00	2
8	Hillary Bor	United States	8:12.19	1
9	Leonard Bett	Kenya	8:12.34	
10	Daniel Arce	Spain	8:14.31	
11	Mohamed Amin Jhinaoui	Tunisia	8:16.38	
12	Ala Zoghlami	Italy	8:24.04	
13	Yemane Haileselassie	Eritrea	8:26.17	
14	Abrham Sime	Ethiopia	8:28.62	
15	Louis Gilavert	France	8:34.12	
	Lawrence Kemboi	Kenya	DNF	
	Wilberforce Chemiat Kones	Kenya	DNF	

Men's High Jump
Place	Athlete	Country	Mark	Points
1st place, gold medalist(s)	JuVaughn Harrison	United States	2.27 m	8
2nd place, silver medalist(s)	Norbert Kobielski	Poland	2.27 m	7
3rd place, bronze medalist(s)	Gianmarco Tamberi	Italy	2.24 m	6
4	Brandon Starc	Australia	2.24 m	5
5	Andriy Protsenko	Ukraine	2.24 m	4
6	Marco Fassinotti	Italy	2.20 m	3
7	Yonathan Kapitolnik	Israel	2.20 m	2
8	Django Lovett	Canada	2.15 m	1
9	Loïc Gasch	Switzerland	2.15 m	

Men's Shot Put
Place	Athlete	Country	Mark	Points
1st place, gold medalist(s)	Joe Kovacs	United States	21.85 m	8
2nd place, silver medalist(s)	Filip Mihaljević	Croatia	21.18 m	7
3rd place, bronze medalist(s)	Konrad Bukowiecki	Poland	21.18 m	6
4	Darlan Romani	Brazil	21.15 m	5
5	Armin Sinančević	Serbia	20.96 m	4
6	Nick Ponzio	Italy	20.59 m	3
7	Michał Haratyk	Poland	20.23 m	2
8	David Storl	Germany	20.10 m	1
9	Leonardo Fabbri	Italy	19.95 m	

Men's Discus Throw
Place	Athlete	Country	Mark	Points
1st place, gold medalist(s)	Kristjan Čeh	Slovenia	70.72 m	8
2nd place, silver medalist(s)	Lukas Weißhaidinger	Austria	68.30 m	7
3rd place, bronze medalist(s)	Daniel Ståhl	Sweden	65.87 m	6
4	Andrius Gudžius	Lithuania	65.82 m	5
5	Lawrence Okoye	Great Britain	64.72 m	4
6	Sam Mattis	United States	63.93 m	3
7	Simon Pettersson	Sweden	63.73 m	2
8	Matthew Denny	Australia	63.53 m	1
9	Giovanni Faloci	Italy	55.80 m	

Women's 200m (+1.3 m/s)
Place	Athlete	Country	Time	Points
1st place, gold medalist(s)	Shericka Jackson	Jamaica	21.91	8
2nd place, silver medalist(s)	Elaine Thompson-Herah	Jamaica	22.25	7
3rd place, bronze medalist(s)	Dina Asher-Smith	Great Britain	22.27	6
4	Shaunae Miller-Uibo	Bahamas	22.48	5
5	Marie-Josée Ta Lou	Ivory Coast	22.77	4
6	Mujinga Kambundji	Switzerland	22.80	3
7	Allyson Felix	United States	22.97	2
8	Dalia Kaddari	Italy	23.29	1
9	Beth Dobbin	Great Britain	23.36	

Women's 800m
Place	Athlete	Country	Time	Points
1st place, gold medalist(s)	Athing Mu	United States	1:57.01	8
2nd place, silver medalist(s)	Rénelle Lamote	France	1:58.48	7
3rd place, bronze medalist(s)	Elena Bellò	Italy	1:58.97	6
4	Mary Moraa	Kenya	1:59.26	5
5	Freweyni Hailu	Ethiopia	1:59.39	4
6	Natoya Goule	Jamaica	1:59.54	3
7	Catriona Bisset	Australia	1:59.73	2
8	Lindsey Butterworth	Canada	1:59.93	1
9	Jemma Reekie	Great Britain	2:00.28	
10	Halimah Nakaayi	Uganda	2:01.15	
11	Rose Mary Almanza	Cuba	2:02.40	
	Aneta Lemiesz	Poland	DNF	

Women's 1500m
Place	Athlete	Country	Time	Points
1st place, gold medalist(s)	Hirut Meshesha	Ethiopia	4:03.79	8
2nd place, silver medalist(s)	Axumawit Embaye	Ethiopia	4:04.53	7
3rd place, bronze medalist(s)	Laura Muir	Great Britain	4:04.93	6
4	Ciara Mageean	Ireland	4:05.44	5
5	Cory McGee	United States	4:05.69	4
6	Gaia Sabbatini	Italy	4:05.82	3
7	Karoline Bjerkeli Grøvdal	Norway	4:05.83	2
8	Federica Del Buono	Italy	4:06.16	1
9	Winnie Nanyondo	Uganda	4:06.17	
10	Helen Schlachtenhaufen	United States	4:06.94	
11	Hanna Klein	Germany	4:07.21	
12	Habitam Alemu	Ethiopia	4:07.43	
13	Ludovica Cavalli	Italy	4:08.39	
14	Marta Pérez	Spain	4:08.72	
	Ellie Sanford	Australia	DNF	

Women's 100mH (+0.1 m/s)
Place	Athlete	Country	Time	Points
1st place, gold medalist(s)	Jasmine Camacho-Quinn	Puerto Rico	12.37	8
2nd place, silver medalist(s)	Britany Anderson	Jamaica	12.50	7
3rd place, bronze medalist(s)	Nia Ali	United States	12.71	6
4	Pia Skrzyszowska	Poland	12.74	5
5	Danielle Williams	Jamaica	12.90	4
6	Nadine Visser	Netherlands	12.98	3
7	Megan Tapper	Jamaica	13.08	2
8	Luminosa Bogliolo	Italy	13.10	1
9	Elisa Di Lazzaro	Italy	13.10	

Women's 400mH
Place	Athlete	Country	Time	Points
1st place, gold medalist(s)	Femke Bol	Netherlands	53.02	8
2nd place, silver medalist(s)	Janieve Russell	Jamaica	54.18	7
3rd place, bronze medalist(s)	Anna Ryzhykova	Ukraine	54.50	6
4	Lina Nielsen	Great Britain	54.73	5
5	Rushell Clayton	Jamaica	54.80	4
6	Ayomide Folorunso	Italy	54.84	3
7	Viktoriya Tkachuk	Ukraine	55.37	2
8	Linda Olivieri	Italy	56.25	1
9	Yasmin Giger	Switzerland	56.52	

Women's Pole Vault
Place	Athlete	Country	Mark	Points
1st place, gold medalist(s)	Sandi Morris	United States	4.81 m	8
2nd place, silver medalist(s)	Holly Bradshaw	Great Britain	4.60 m	7
3rd place, bronze medalist(s)	Roberta Bruni	Italy	4.60 m	6
4	Tina Šutej	Slovenia	4.60 m	5
5	Katie Moon	United States	4.60 m	4
6	Katerina Stefanidi	Greece	4.50 m	3
7	Robeilys Peinado	Venezuela	4.40 m	2
8	Elisa Molinarolo	Italy	4.40 m	1
	Angelica Moser	Switzerland	NM	

Women's Long Jump
Place	Athlete	Country	Mark	Points
1st place, gold medalist(s)	Maryna Bekh-Romanchuk	Ukraine	6.85 m (+1.6 m/s)	8
2nd place, silver medalist(s)	Malaika Mihambo	Germany	6.79 m (−0.3 m/s)	7
3rd place, bronze medalist(s)	Quanesha Burks	United States	6.77 m (−0.5 m/s)	6
4	Milica Gardašević	Serbia	6.71 m (±0.0 m/s)	5
5	Christabel Nettey	Canada	6.69 m (+0.1 m/s)	4
6	Khaddi Sagnia	Sweden	6.66 m (−0.3 m/s)	3
7	Jazmin Sawyers	Great Britain	6.61 m (−0.2 m/s)	2
8	Larissa Iapichino	Italy	6.55 m (−0.2 m/s)	1
9	Chantel Malone	British Virgin Islands	6.29 m (−0.6 m/s)	

=== Promotional Events ===
Men's 200m (−0.1 m/s)
Place	Athlete	Country	Time
1st place, gold medalist(s)	Kenny Bednarek	United States	20.01
2nd place, silver medalist(s)	Luxolo Adams	South Africa	20.33
3rd place, bronze medalist(s)	Filippo Tortu	Italy	20.40
4	Fausto Desalu	Italy	20.59
5	Nethaneel Mitchell-Blake	Great Britain	20.59
6	Owen Ansah	Germany	20.72
7	Joshua Hartmann	Germany	20.78
8	Lorenzo Patta	Italy	20.91
9	Taymir Burnet	Netherlands	21.26

Men's 3000m Race Walk
Place	Athlete	Country	Time
1st place, gold medalist(s)	Francesco Fortunato	Italy	10:57.77
2nd place, silver medalist(s)	Gianluca Picchiottino	Italy	10:59.91
3rd place, bronze medalist(s)	Massimo Stano	Italy	11:06.15
4	Diego García	Spain	11:08.01
5	Davide Finocchietti	Italy	11:12.84
6	Michele Antonelli	Italy	11:14.49
7	Andrea Agrusti	Italy	11:29.19
8	Riccardo Orsoni	Italy	11:40.57
9	Diego Giampaolo	Italy	11:45.20
10	Jonathan Hilbert	Germany	11:56.51

=== National Events ===
Men's 100m (+0.4 m/s)
Place	Athlete	Country	Time
1st place, gold medalist(s)	Gaetano Barone	Italy	11.10

Women's 100m (−0.3 m/s)
Place	Athlete	Country	Time
1st place, gold medalist(s)	Serena Caravelli	Italy	12.74
2nd place, silver medalist(s)	Rosa Iovine	Italy	12.88
3rd place, bronze medalist(s)	Tanya Piergallini	Italy	13.12

== See also ==
- 2022 Diamond League
