= 2022 Diamond League =

- Edition: 13th
- Dates: 13 May – 8 September
- Events: 32
- Meetings: 14

The 2022 Diamond League was the thirteenth season of the Diamond League, an annual series of outdoor track and field meetings, organised by World Athletics. The competition was a revision to the top level athletics series since the Diamond League was founded in 2010. The number of Diamond Discipline events was 32, and the dual-meet final format was again replaced by a single final, for a total of 12 meetings. A meeting in China was originally added to the calendar, but was later postponed to 2023. The reduction of events was aimed at allowing a standardized 120-minute television format for the series. Each meeting hosted a selected number of Diamond Discipline events, most of which were broadcast in the meeting's two hour TV window. Events losing Diamond Discipline status would feature on the World Athletics Continental Tour, which will replace the IAAF World Challenge as the second tier of track and field meetings.

== Schedule ==
The following thirteen meetings are scheduled to be included in the 2022 season. On May 6, 2022, World Athletics announced that two meetings originally to be held in China were removed from the calendar. Kamila Skolimowska Memorial in Chorzów was chosen as an alternate meeting.

Leg	Date	Meet	Stadium	City	Country	Events (M+W)
1	13 May	Doha Diamond League	Suheim bin Hamad Stadium	Doha	Qatar	8 + 6 = 14
2	21 May	Birmingham Diamond League (Anniversary Games)	Alexander Stadium	Birmingham	United Kingdom	6 + 8 = 14
3	27–28 May	Prefontaine Classic	Hayward Field	Eugene	United States	7 + 7 = 14
4	5 June	Meeting International Mohammed VI d'Athlétisme de Rabat	Prince Moulay Abdellah Stadium	Rabat	Morocco	7 + 7 = 14
5	9 June	Golden Gala Pietro Mennea	Stadio Olimpico	Rome	Italy	7 + 7 = 14
6	16 June	Bislett Games	Bislett Stadium	Oslo	Norway	8 + 6 = 14
7	18 June	Meeting de Paris	Stade Sébastien Charléty	Paris	France	7 + 7 = 14
8	30 June	Bauhausgalan	Stockholm Olympic Stadium	Stockholm	Sweden	7 + 7 = 14
9	6 August	Kamila Skolimowska Memorial	Stadion Śląski	Chorzów	Poland	7 + 7 = 14
10	10 August	Herculis	Stade Louis II	Fontvieille	Monaco	7 + 7 = 14
11	26 August	Athletissima	Stade Olympique de la Pontaise	Lausanne	Switzerland	7 + 7 = 14
12	2 September	AG Memorial Van Damme	King Baudouin Stadium	Brussels	Belgium	7 + 7 = 14
Grand Final	7–8 September	Weltklasse Zürich	Letzigrund	Zürich	Switzerland	16 + 16 = 32

== Results ==
- All results were taken from the official Diamond League website.
- Events held at Diamond League meets, but not included in the Diamond League points race, are marked in grey background.

=== Men ===
==== Track ====
#	Meeting	100 m	200 m	400 m	800 m	1500 m	5000 m	110 m h	400 m h	3000 m st
1	Doha	-	Noah Lyles (USA); 19.72	-	Noah Kibet (KEN); 1:49.08 SB	Abel Kipsang (KEN); 3:35.70	-	-	Alison dos Santos (BRA); 47.24 WL MR	Soufiane El Bakkali (MAR); 8:09.66 WL
2	Birmingham	Aaron Brown (CAN); 10.13	-	Matthew Hudson-Smith (GBR); 45.32	Marco Arop (CAN); 1:45.41 SB	Abel Kipsang (KEN); 3:35.15	-	Hansle Parchment (JAM); 13.09 WL	-	-
3	Eugene	Trayvon Bromell (USA); 9.93	-	Michael Norman (USA); 43.60 WL DLR	-	Jakob Ingebrigtsen (NOR); 3:49.76 WL (Mile)	Berihu Aregawi (ETH); 12:50.05 WL MR PB	-	Alison dos Santos (BRA); 47.23 WL	-
4	Rabat	-	Kenny Bednarek (USA); 20.21	-	Emmanuel Wanyonyi (KEN); 1:45.47	Jake Wightman (GBR); 3:32.62	-	-	Khallifah Rosser (USA); 48.25 MR	Soufiane El Bakkali (MAR); 7:58.28 WL MR
5	Rome	Fred Kerley (USA); 9.92	Kenny Bednarek (USA); 20.01	Kirani James (GRD); 44.54	-	-	Nicholas Kimeli (KEN); 12:46.33 WL MR PB	-	-	Lamecha Girma (ETH); 7:59.23
6	Oslo	Andre de Grasse (CAN); 10.05	-	Kirani James (GRD); 44.78	-	Jakob Ingebrigtsen (NOR); 3:46.46 WL NR DLR PB (Mile)	Telahun Haile Bekele (ETH); 13:03.51	Devon Allen (USA); 13.22	Alison dos Santos (BRA); 47.26	-
7	Paris	-	Luxolo Adams (RSA); 19.82 PB	Steven Gardiner (BAH); 44.21	Benjamin Robert (FRA); 1:43.75 PB	-	Selemon Barega (ETH); 12:56.19	Devon Allen (USA); 13.16	-	-
8	Stockholm	Akani Simbine (RSA); 10.02 SB	-	–	Slimane Moula (ALG); 1:44.60	Filip Sasínek (CZE); 3:36.56	Dominic Lobalu (ART); 7:29.48 WL PB (3000 m)	-	Alison dos Santos (BRA); 46.80 MR WL	-
9	Silesia	Trayvon Bromell (USA); 9.95	-	Michael Norman (USA); 44.11 MR	Emmanuel Korir (KEN); 1:45.72	-	-	-	Alison dos Santos (BRA); 47.80 MR	-
10	Monaco	-	Noah Lyles (USA); 19.45 MR	-	Jake Wightman (GBR); 2:13.88 MR PB (1000 m)	-	Thierry Ndikumwenayo (BDI); 7:25.93 NR DLR WL PB (3000 m)	Grant Holloway (USA); 12.99 SB	-	-
11	Lausanne	-	Noah Lyles (USA); 19.56	-	-	Jakob Ingebrigtsen (NOR); 3:29.05 WL	-	Rasheed Broadbell (JAM); 12.99 PB	Khallifah Rosser (USA); 47.68	Soufiane El Bakkali (MAR); 8:02.45
12	Brussels	-	Erriyon Knighton (USA); 20.07	Kevin Borlée (BEL); 45.72	Jake Wightman (GBR); 1:43.65 PB	-	Jacob Krop (KEN); 12:45.71 WL PB	-	Alison dos Santos (BRA); 47.54	-
13	Zürich; Final	Trayvon Bromell (USA); 9.94	Noah Lyles (USA); 19.52 MR	Kirani James (GRN); 44.26	Emmanuel Korir (KEN); 1:43.26 WL	Jakob Ingebrigtsen (NOR); 3:29.02 WL	Nicholas Kimeli (KEN); 12:59.05	Grant Holloway (USA); 13.02	Alison dos Santos (BRA); 46.98	Soufiane El Bakkali (MAR); 8:07.67

==== Field ====
#	Meeting	Long jump	Triple jump	High jump	Pole vault	Shot put	Discus	Javelin
1	Doha	-	-	Woo Sang-hyeok (KOR); 2.33 m WL	Armand Duplantis (SWE); 6.02 m	-	-	Anderson Peters (GRN); 93.07 m WL AR NR PB
2	Birmingham	-	-	Django Lovett (CAN); 2.28 SB	-	-	Kristjan Čeh (SLO); 71.27 m WL DLR NR PB	-
3	Eugene	-	-		Armand Duplantis (SWE); 5.91 m	Ryan Crouser (USA); 23.02 m WL	-	-
4	Rabat	Miltiadis Tentoglou (GRE); 8.27 m	-	-	-	-	Kristjan Čeh (SLO); 69.68 m	-
5	Rome	-	-	JuVaughn Harrison (USA); 2.27 SB	-	Joe Kovacs (USA); 21.85 m	Kristjan Čeh (SLO); 70.72 m MR	-
6	Oslo	Miltiadis Tentoglou (GRE); 8.10 m	-	-	Armand Duplantis (SWE); 6.02 m MR WL	-	-	-
7	Paris	-	Jordan Díaz (CUB); 17.66 m	-	Ben Broeders (BEL); 5.80 m	-	-	-
8	Stockholm	Miltiadis Tentoglou (GRE); 8.31	-	-	Armand Duplantis (SWE); 6.16 m DLR MR	-	Kristjan Čeh (SLO); 70.02 m MR	Anderson Peters (GRN); 90.31 m MR
9	Silesia	Miltiadis Tentoglou (GRE); 8.13 MR	Andy Díaz (CUB); 17.53	-	Armand Duplantis (SWE); 6.10 m MR	Joe Kovacs (USA); 21.79 m	-	Jakub Vadlejch (CZE); 86.68 m
10	Monaco	Maykel Massó (CUB); 8.35 m SB	-	Mutaz Essa Barshim (QAT); 2.30	-	-	-	-
11	Lausanne	-	Andy Díaz (CUB); 17.67	Andriy Protsenko (UKR); 2.24	Armand Duplantis (SWE); 6.10 MR	Joe Kovacs (USA); 22.65	-	Neeraj Chopra (IND); 89.08 m
12	Brussels	-	Lázaro Martínez (CUB); 17.49	-	Ernest John Obiena (PHI); 5.91	Joe Kovacs (USA); 22.61 MR	-	-
13	Zürich; Final	Miltiadis Tentoglou (GRE); 8.42	Andy Díaz (CUB); 17.70 PB	Gianmarco Tamberi (ITA); 2.34 SB	Armand Duplantis (SWE); 6.07 m MR	Joe Kovacs (USA); 23.23 DLR MR WL PB	Kristjan Čeh (SLO); 67.10	Neeraj Chopra (IND); 88.44 m

=== Women ===
==== Track ====
#	Meeting	100 m	200 m	400 m	800 m	1500 m	5000 m	100 m h	400 m h	3000 m st
1	Doha	-	Gabrielle Thomas (USA); 21.98 =MR SB	Marileidy Paulino (DOM); 51.20 SB	-	-	Francine Niyonsaba (BDI); 8:37.70 (3000 m) WL	Kendra Harrison (USA); 12.43	-	-
2	Birmingham	Dina Asher-Smith (GBR); 11.11	-	-	Keely Hodgkinson (GBR); 1:58.63	Laura Muir (GBR); 4:02.81	Dawit Seyaum (ETH); 14:47.55 WL MR	-	Dalilah Muhammad (USA); 54.54	-
3	Eugene	Elaine Thompson-Herah (JAM); 10.79 SB	Shelly-Ann Fraser-Pryce (JAM); 22.41 SB	-	Keely Hodgkinson (GBR); 1:57.72 WL	Faith Kipyegon (KEN); 3:52.59 WL MR	Ejgayehu Taye (ETH); 14:12.98 WL MR PB	Jasmine Camacho-Quinn (PRI); 12.45	-	Norah Jeruto (KAZ); 8:57.97 WL
4	Rabat	Elaine Thompson-Herah (JAM); 10.83 MR	-	Marileidy Paulino (DOM); 50.10	-	Hirut Meshesha (ETH); 3:57.30 PB	Mercy Cherono (KEN); 8:40.29 (3000 m)	-	-	-
5	Rome	-	Shericka Jackson (JAM); 21.91 MR SB	-	Athing Mu (USA); 1:57.01 WL	Hirut Meshesha (ETH); 4:03.79	-	Jasmine Camacho-Quinn (PRI); 12.37 MR WL	Femke Bol (NED); 53.03 SB	-
6	Oslo	-	Ida Karstoft (DEN); 22.73 NR PB	-	Keely Hodgkinson (GBR); 1:57.71 SB	-	Dawit Seyaum (ETH); 14:25.84 PB	-	Femke Bol (NED); 52.61 MR SB	-
7	Paris	Shelly-Ann Fraser-Pryce (JAM); 10.67 WL MR	-	Shaunae Miller-Uibo (BAH); 50.10	-	-	-	Tobi Amusan (NGR); 12.41 AR PB	-	Winfred Yavi (BHN); 8:56.55 WL PB
8	Stockholm	-	Dina Asher-Smith (GBR); 22.37	Anna Kiełbasińska (POL); 50.60	Mary Moraa (KEN); 1:57.68	Linden Hall (AUS); 4:02.65	-	Jasmine Camacho-Quinn (PRI); 12.46	Femke Bol (NED); 52.27 DLR MR SB	Daisy Jepkemei (KAZ); 9:15.77 SB
9	Silesia	Shelly-Ann Fraser-Pryce (JAM); 10.66 WL MR	Shericka Jackson (JAM); 21.84 MR	Femke Bol (NED); 49.75 MR NR	Ajeé Wilson (USA); 1:58.28 MR	Diribe Welteji (ETH); 3:56.91 MR PB	Sifan Hassan (NED); 8:39.27 (3000 m)	Jasmine Camacho-Quinn (PRI); 12.34 MR	-	-
10	Monaco	Shelly-Ann Fraser-Pryce (JAM); 10.62 WL MR MWR	-	Shaunae Miller-Uibo (BAH); 49.28	Natoya Goule (JAM); 1:56.98 SB	Faith Kipyegon (KEN); 3:50.37 NR WL PB	-	-	Rushell Clayton (JAM); 53.33 PB	Werkuha Getachew (ETH); 9:06.19
11	Lausanne	Aleia Hobbs (USA); 10.87	-	Marileidy Paulino (DOM); 49.87	Rénelle Lamote (FRA); 1:57.84 PB	-	Francine Niyonsaba (BDI); 8:26.80 (3000 m) MR	Jasmine Camacho-Quinn (PUR); 12.34 MR	Femke Bol (NED); 52.95 MR	-
12	Brussels	Shericka Jackson (JAM); 10.73	-	Fiordaliza Cofil (DOM); 49.80 PB	-	Ciara Mageean (IRL); 3:56.63 NR PB	-	Jasmine Camacho-Quinn (PUR); 12.27 MR SB	-	Jackline Chepkoech (KEN); 9:02.43 PB
13	Zürich; Final	Shelly-Ann Fraser-Pryce (JAM); 10.65 MR	Shericka Jackson (JAM); 21.80	Marileidy Paulino (DOM); 48.99	Mary Moraa (KEN); 1:57.63	Faith Kipyegon (KEN); 4:00.44	Beatrice Chebet (KEN); 14:31.03	Tobi Amusan (NGR); 12.29 MR	Femke Bol (NED); 53.03	Werkuha Getachew (ETH); 9:03.57

==== Field ====
#	Meeting	Long jump	Triple jump	High jump	Pole vault	Shot put	Discus	Javelin
1	Doha	-	Shanieka Ricketts (JAM); 14.82 m	-	-	Chase Ealey (USA); 19.51 m SB	-	-
2	Birmingham	Malaika Mihambo (GER); 7.09 m WL MR	-	-	Sandi Morris (USA); 4.73 m WL	-	Valarie Allman (USA); 67.85 m	-
3	Eugene	Khaddi Sagnia (SWE); 6.95 m PB	-	Yaroslava Mahuchikh (UKR); 2.00 m WL	-	-	Valarie Allman (USA); 68.35 m	-
4	Rabat	-	Thea LaFond (DMA); 14.46 m	Yaroslava Mahuchikh (UKR); 1.96 m	Sandi Morris (USA); 4.65 m	-	-	-
5	Rome	Maryna Bekh-Romanchuk (UKR); 6.85 m SB	-	-	Sandi Morris (USA); 4.81 m WL	-	-	-
6	Oslo	-	-	-	-	Chase Ealey (USA); 20.13 m PB	Sandra Perković (CRO); 66.82 m	-
7	Paris	-	-	Yaroslava Mahuchikh (UKR); 2.01 m WL	-	-	Valarie Allman (USA); 68.68 m MR	Haruka Kitaguchi (JPN); 63.13 m
8	Stockholm	Lorraine Ugen (GBR); 6.81 m SB	-	Eleanor Patterson (AUS); 1.96 m SB	-	Chase Ealey (USA); 20.48m	-	-
9	Silesia	-	-	Safina Sadullayeva (UZB); 1.92 m	-	Chase Ealey (USA); 20.38 m MR	-	Haruka Kitaguchi (JPN); 65.10 m SB
10	Monaco	-	Yulimar Rojas (VEN); 15.01 m	-	Nina Kennedy (AUS); 4.66	-	-	Kelsey-Lee Barber (AUS); 64.50 m
11	Lausanne	-	Yulimar Rojas (VEN); 15.31m	-	Tina Šutej (SLO); 4.70	-	-	-
12	Brussels	Ese Brume (NGR); 6.83	-	Yaroslava Mahuchikh (UKR); 2.05	-	-	-	Kara Winger (USA); 68.11 NR MR WL
13	Zürich; Final	Ivana Vuleta (SRB); 6.97	Yulimar Rojas (VEN); 15.28	Yaroslava Mahuchikh (UKR); 2.03	Nina Kennedy (AUS); 4.81 SB	Chase Ealey (USA); 20.19	Valarie Allman (USA); 67.77	Kara Winger (USA); 64.98

== Diamond League Final ==
=== Men ===
100 m Men
Rank	Lane/Order	Name	Nationality	Result	Reaction Time	Notes
1st place, gold medalist(s)		Trayvon Bromell	United States	9.94		
2nd place, silver medalist(s)		Yohan Blake	Jamaica	10.05		
3rd place, bronze medalist(s)		Aaron Brown	Canada	10.06		
4		Akani Simbine	South Africa	10.07		
5		Yupun Abeykoon	Sri Lanka	10.14		
6		Reece Prescod	(United Kingdom) Great Britain	10.16		
7		Kyree King	United States	10.18		
8		Andre De Grasse	Canada	10.21		
200 m Men
1st place, gold medalist(s)		Noah Lyles	United States	19.52		
2nd place, silver medalist(s)		Aaron Brown	Canada	20.02		
3rd place, bronze medalist(s)		Alexander Ogando	Dominican Republic	20.02		
4		Erriyon Knighton	United States	20.20		
5		Kenneth Bednarek	United States	20.20		
6		Andre De Grasse	Canada	20.43		
7		Jereem Richards	Trinidad and Tobago	20.56		
8		Eseosa Fostine Desalu	Italy	20.79		
400 m Men
1st place, gold medalist(s)		Kirani James	Grenada	44.26		
2nd place, silver medalist(s)		Bryce Deadmon	United States	44.47		
3rd place, bronze medalist(s)		Vernon Norwood	United States	44.66		
4		Zakhiti Nene	South Africa	44.74		
5		Ricky Petrucciani	Switzerland	45.31		
6		Isaak Makwala	Botswana	45.56		
7		Liemarvin Bonevacia	Netherlands	45.84		
110 m hurdles Men
1st place, gold medalist(s)		Grant Holloway	United States	13.02		
2nd place, silver medalist(s)		Rasheed Broadbell	Jamaica	13.06		
3rd place, bronze medalist(s)		Hansle Parchment	Jamaica	13.26		
4		Asier Martínez	Spain	13.29		
5		Trey Cunningham	United States	13.30		
6		Jason Joseph	Switzerland	13.54		
7		Damian Czykier	Poland	13.65		
		Just Kwaou-Mathey	France	13.73		
		Rafael Pereira	Brazil	13.73		
400 m hurdles Men
1st place, gold medalist(s)		Alison dos Santos	Brazil	46.98		
2nd place, silver medalist(s)		Khallifah Rosser	United States	47.76		
3rd place, bronze medalist(s)		C.J. Allen	United States	48.21		
4		Wilfried Happio	France	48.72		
5		Julien Watrin	Belgium	49.08		
6		Yasmani Copello	Turkey	49.10		
7		Julien Bonvin	Switzerland	49.63		
8		Nick Smidt	Netherlands	51.82		
800 m Men
1st place, gold medalist(s)		Emmanuel Korir	Kenya	1:43.26		
2nd place, silver medalist(s)		Marco Arop	Canada	1:43.38		
3rd place, bronze medalist(s)		Jake Wightman	(United Kingdom) Great Britain	1:44.10		
4		Wyclife Kinyamal	Kenya	1:44.47		
5		Bryce Hoppel	United States	1:44.77		
6		Andreas Kramer	Sweden	1:44.94		
7		Gabriel Tual	France	1:45.25		
8		Benjamin Robert	France	1:48.11		
		Patryk Sieradzki	Poland	DNF		Pacemaker
1500 m Men
1st place, gold medalist(s)		Jakob Ingebrigtsen	Norway	3:29.02		
2nd place, silver medalist(s)		Timothy Cheruiyot	Kenya	3:30.27		
3rd place, bronze medalist(s)		Oliver Hoare	Australia	3:30.57		
4		Abel Kipsang	Kenya	3:31.36		
5		Stewart McSweyn	Australia	3:31.45		
6		Josh Kerr	(United Kingdom) Great Britain	3:31.85		
7		Charles Grethen	Luxembourg	3:33.16		
8		Abdellatif Sadiki	Morocco	3:34.12		
9		Jake Heyward	(United Kingdom) Great Britain	3:34.27		
		Michał Rozmys	Poland	3:34.80		
		Matthew Ramsden	Australia	DNF		Pacemaker
3000 m steeplechase Men
1st place, gold medalist(s)		Soufiane El Bakkali	Morocco	8:07.67		
2nd place, silver medalist(s)		Getnet Wale	Ethiopia	8:08.56		
3rd place, bronze medalist(s)		Abraham Kibiwot	Kenya	8:08.61		
4		Ryuji Miura	Japan	8:12.65		
5		Leonar Bett	Kenya	8:13.21		
6		Amos Serem	Kenya	8:15.64		
7		Lawrence Kemboi Kipsang	Kenya	8:17.98		
8		Hailemariyam Amare	Ethiopia	8:24.49		
		Abderrafia Bouassel	Morocco	DNF		
		Wilberforce C. Kones	Kenya	DNF		Pacemaker
5000 m Men
1st place, gold medalist(s)	2-4	Nicholas Kipkorir Kimeli	Kenya	12:59.05		
2nd place, silver medalist(s)	2-2	Domnic Lokinyomo Lobalu	South Sudan	12:59.40		
3rd place, bronze medalist(s)	1-2	Grant Fisher	United States	13:00.56		
4	3-3	Telahun Haile Bekele	Ethiopia	13:02.21		
5	2-3	Berihu Aregawi	Ethiopia	13:03.18		
6	3-1	Cornelius Kemboi	Kenya	13:09.38		
7	1-1	Selemon Barega	Ethiopia	13:13.16		
	2-1	Yomif Kejelcha	Ethiopia	DNF		
	1-3	Jacob Krop	Kenya	DNF		
	3-2	Thierry Ndikumwenayo	Burundi	DNF		
	1-4	Maximilian Thorwirth	Germany	DNF		Pacemaker
Pole Vault Men
1st place, gold medalist(s)		Armand Duplantis	Sweden	6.07		
2nd place, silver medalist(s)		Sondre Guttormsen	Norway	5.86		
3rd place, bronze medalist(s)		Christopher Nilsen	United States	5.81		
4		Renaud Lavillenie	France	5.81		
5		Ben Broeders	Belgium	5.72		
6		Thiago Braz	Brazil	5.72		
7		Dominik Alberto	Switzerland	5.42		
High Jump Men
1st place, gold medalist(s)	5	Gianmarco Tamberi	Italy	2.34		SB
2nd place, silver medalist(s)	2	JuVaughn Harrison	United States	2.34		SB
3rd place, bronze medalist(s)	1	Django Lovett	Canada	2.27		
4	4	Andriy Protsenko	Ukraine	2.24		
5	3	Hamish Kerr	New Zealand	2.21		
6	6	Mutaz Essa Barshim	Qatar	2.18		
Long Jump Men
1st place, gold medalist(s)		Miltiadis Tentoglou	Greece	8.42		
2nd place, silver medalist(s)		Marquis Dendy	United States	8.18		
3rd place, bronze medalist(s)		Maykel Massó	Cuba	8.05		
4		Thobias Montler	Sweden	8.01		
5		Simon Ehammer	Switzerland	7.93		
6		Emiliano Lasa	Uruguay	7.64		
Triple Jump Men
1st place, gold medalist(s)		Andy Díaz	Cuba	17.70		
2nd place, silver medalist(s)		Pedro Pichardo	Portugal	17.63		
3rd place, bronze medalist(s)		Jordan Díaz	Cuba	17.60		
4		Hugues Fabrico Zango	Burkina Faso	17.43		
5		Almir Dos Santos	Brazil	17.10		
6		Lázaro Martínez	Cuba	16.75		
Shot Put Men
1st place, gold medalist(s)	5	Joe Kovacs	United States	23.23		DLR, MR, WL, PB
2nd place, silver medalist(s)	6	Ryan Crouser	United States	22.74		
3rd place, bronze medalist(s)	4	Tomas Walsh	New Zealand	21.90		
4	2	Jacko Gill	New Zealand	21.51		
5	3	Filip Mihaljevic	Croatia	21.43		
6	1	Nick Ponzio	Italy	20.71		
Discus Men
1st place, gold medalist(s)		Kristjan Čeh	Slovenia	67.10		
2nd place, silver medalist(s)		Lukas Weißhaidinger	Austria	65.70		
3rd place, bronze medalist(s)		Andrius Gudžius	Lithuania	65.28		
4		Sam Mattis	United States	65.24		
5		Daniel Ståhl	Sweden	65.16		
6		Matthew Denny	Australia	64.81		
Javelin Men
1st place, gold medalist(s)		Neeraj Chopra	India	88.44		
2nd place, silver medalist(s)		Jakub Vadlejch	Czech Republic	86.94		
3rd place, bronze medalist(s)		Julian Weber	Germany	83.73		
4		Curtis Thompson	United States	82.10		
5		Patriks Gailums	Latvia	80.44		
6		Leandro Ramos	Portugal	71.96		

=== Women ===
100 m Women
Rank	Lane/Order	Name	Nationality	Result	Reaction Time	Notes
1st place, gold medalist(s)		Shelly-Ann Fraser-Pryce	Jamaica	10.65		=MR
2nd place, silver medalist(s)		Shericka Jackson	Jamaica	10.81		
3rd place, bronze medalist(s)		Marie-Josée Ta Lou	Ivory Coast	10.91		
4		Daryll Neita	(United Kingdom) Great Britain	11.02		
5		Aleia Hobbs	United States	11.03		
6		Twanisha Terry	United States	11.10		
7		Sha'Carri Richardson	United States	11.13		
8		Natasha Morrison	Jamaica	DQ		False Start
200 m Women
1st place, gold medalist(s)		Shericka Jackson	Jamaica	21.80		
2nd place, silver medalist(s)		Gabrielle Thomas	United States	22.38		
3rd place, bronze medalist(s)		Tamara Clark	United States	22.42		
4		Jenna Prandini	United States	22.45		
5		Mujinga Kambundji	Switzerland	22.65		
6		Tynia Gaither	Bahamas	22.66		
7		Ida Karstoft	Denmark	22.80		
8		Beth Dobbin	(United Kingdom) Great Britain	23.83		
400 m Women
1st place, gold medalist(s)		Marileidy Paulino	Dominican Republic	48.99		PB
2nd place, silver medalist(s)		Fiordaliza Cofil	Dominican Republic	49.93		
3rd place, bronze medalist(s)		Sada Williams	Barbados	49.98		
4		Candice McLeod	Jamaica	50.03		
5		Natalia Kaczmarek	Poland	50.74		
6		Anna Kielbasinska	Poland	50.93		
7		Lieke Klaver	Netherlands	51.55		
8		Stephenie Ann McPherson	Jamaica	52.32		
100 m hurdles Women
1st place, gold medalist(s)		Tobi Amusan	Nigeria	12.29		
2nd place, silver medalist(s)		Tia Jones	United States	12.40		
3rd place, bronze medalist(s)		Britany Anderson	Jamaica	12.42		
4		Jasmine Camacho-Quinn	Puerto Rico	12.49		
5		Devynne Charlton	Bahamas	12,66		
6		Nia Ali	United States	12.67		
7		Pia Skrzyszowska	Poland	12.72		
8		Kendra Harrison	United States	13.02		
9		Ditaji Kambundji	Switzerland	13.22		
400 m hurdles Women
1st place, gold medalist(s)		Femke Bol	Netherlands	53.03		
2nd place, silver medalist(s)		Gianna Woodruff	Panama	53.72		
3rd place, bronze medalist(s)		Janieve Russell	Jamaica	53.77		
4		Dalilah Muhammad	United States	53.83		
5		Rushell Clayton	Jamaica	54.25		
6		Viktoriya Tkachuk	Ukraine	54.79		
7		Anna Ryzhykova	Ukraine	55.06		
8		Ayomide Folorunso	Italy	55.86		
800 m Women
1st place, gold medalist(s)		Mary Moraa	Kenya	1:57.63		
2nd place, silver medalist(s)		Natoya Goule	Jamaica	1:57.85		
3rd place, bronze medalist(s)		Sage Hurta	United States	1:58.47		
4		Halimah Nakaayi	Uganda	1:58.82		
5		Keely Hodgkinson	(United Kingdom) Great Britain	1:59.06		
6		Anita Horvat	Slovenia	1:59.25		
7		Rénelle Lamote	France	1:59.38		
8		Lore Hoffmann	Switzerland	1:59.69		
9		Elena Bellò	Italy	2:00.24		
		Olivia Baker	United States	DNF		
1500 m Women
1st place, gold medalist(s)		Faith Kipyegon	Kenya	4:00.44		
2nd place, silver medalist(s)		Ciara Mageean	Ireland	4:01.68		
3rd place, bronze medalist(s)		Freweyni Hailu	Ethiopia	4:01.73		
4		Diribe Welteji	Ethiopia	4:01.79		
5		Laura Muir	(United Kingdom) Great Britain	4:02.31		
6		Gudaf Tsegay	Ethiopia	4:02.41		
7		Heather Maclean	United States	4:02.90		
8		Cory McGee	United States	4:04.63		
9		Axumawit Embaye	Ethiopia	4:05.91		
10		Hirut Meshesha	Ethiopia	4:06.28		
		Allie Wilson	United States	DNF		
3000 m steeplechase Women
1st place, gold medalist(s)		Werkuha Getachew	Ethiopia	9:03.57		
2nd place, silver medalist(s)		Winfred Yavi	Bahrain	9:04.47		
3rd place, bronze medalist(s)		Faith Cherotich	Kenya	9:06.14		
4		Zerfe Wondemagegn	Ethiopia	9:06.37		
5		Jackline Chepkoech	Kenya	9:11.06		
6		Sembo Almayew	Ethiopia	9:14.10		
7		Emma Coburn	United States	9:20.00		
8		Nataliya Strebkova	Ukraine	9:32.90		
9		Chiara Scherrer	Switzerland	9:34.52		
10		Daisy Jepkemei	Kazakhstan	9:47.50		
		Virginia Nyambura	Kenya	DNF		
5000 m Women
1st place, gold medalist(s)	1-1	Beatrice Chebet	Kenya	14:31.03		
2nd place, silver medalist(s)	2-1	Margaret Chelimo Kipkemboi	Kenya	14:31.52		
3rd place, bronze medalist(s)	1-3	Gudaf Tsegay	Ethiopia	14:32.11		
4	2-4	Ejgayehu Taye	Ethiopia	14:32.15		
5	1-2	Sifan Hassan	Netherlands	14:37.05		
6	2-3	Alicia Monson	United States	14:37.22		
7	2-2	Hawi Feysa	Ethiopia	14:57.18		
8	3-3	Amy-Eloise Marokovc	(United Kingdom) Great Britain	15:28.24		
9	3-1	Marta García	Spain	15:49.55		
10	3-2	Rose Davies	Australia	16:07.88		
	1-4	Viktória Wagner-Gyürkés	Hungary	DNF		Pacemaker
Pole Vault Women
1st place, gold medalist(s)	6	Nina Kennedy	Australia	4.81		SB
2nd place, silver medalist(s)	7	Sandi Morris	United States	4.76		
3rd place, bronze medalist(s)	3	Tina Šutej	Slovenia	4.61		
4	2	Roberta Bruni	Italy	4.61		
5	5	Wilma Murto	Finland	4.61		
6	4	Katerina Stefanidi	Greece	4.51		
7	1	Angelica Moser	Switzerland	4.51		
High Jump Women
1st place, gold medalist(s)		Yaroslava Mahuchikh	Ukraine	2.03		
2nd place, silver medalist(s)		Iryna Gerashchenko	Ukraine	1.94		
3rd place, bronze medalist(s)		Nicola Olyslagers	Australia	1.94		
4		Nadezhda Dubovitskaya	Kazakhstan	1.91		
5		Elena Vallortigara	Italy	1.91		
6		Yuliya Levchenko	Ukraine	1.88		
Triple Jump Women
1st place, gold medalist(s)		Yulimar Rojas	Venezuela	15.28		
2nd place, silver medalist(s)		Maryna Bekh-Romanchuk	Ukraine	14.96		
3rd place, bronze medalist(s)		Shanieka Ricketts	Jamaica	14.85		
4		Tori Franklin	United States	14.75		
5		Thea LaFond	Dominica	14.56		
6		Patrícia Mamona	Portugal	14.24		
Long Jump Women
1st place, gold medalist(s)		Ivana Vuleta	Serbia	6.97		
2nd place, silver medalist(s)		Khaddi Sagnia	Sweden	6.55		
3rd place, bronze medalist(s)		Quanesha Burks	United States	6.54		
4		Malaika Mihambo	Germany	6.52		
5		Annik Kälin	Switzerland	6.50		
6		Maryna Bekh-Romanchuk	Ukraine	6.50		
7		Lorraine Ugen	(United Kingdom) Great Britain	6.38		
Shot Put Women
1st place, gold medalist(s)	6	Chase Ealey	United States	20.19		
2nd place, silver medalist(s)	3	Sarah Mitton	Canada	19.56		
3rd place, bronze medalist(s)	4	Auriol Dongmo	Portugal	19.46		
4	5	Jessica Schilder	Netherlands	19.06		
5	1	Danniel Thomas-Dodd	Jamaica	19.04		
6	2	Fanny Roos	Sweden	18.37		
Discus Women
1st place, gold medalist(s)		Valarie Allman	United States	67.77		
2nd place, silver medalist(s)		Sandra Perković	Croatia	67.31		
3rd place, bronze medalist(s)		Liliana Cá	Portugal	63.34		
4		Kristin Prudenz	Germany	61.45		
5		Claudine Vita	Germany	61.34		
6		Laulauga Tausaga	United States	58.90		
Javelin Women
1st place, gold medalist(s)		Kara Winger	United States	64.98		
2nd place, silver medalist(s)		Kelsey-Lee Barber	Australia	63.72		
3rd place, bronze medalist(s)		Haruka Kitaguchi	Japan	63.56		
4		Lina Muze	Latvia	60.35		
5		Barbora Špotáková	Czech Republic	59.08		
6		Liveta Jasiūnaitė	Lithuania	57.73		
