= 2010 Golden Gala =

Athletics meeting in Rome, Italy

- Dates: 10 June
- Host city: Rome, Italy
- Venue: Stadio Olimpico
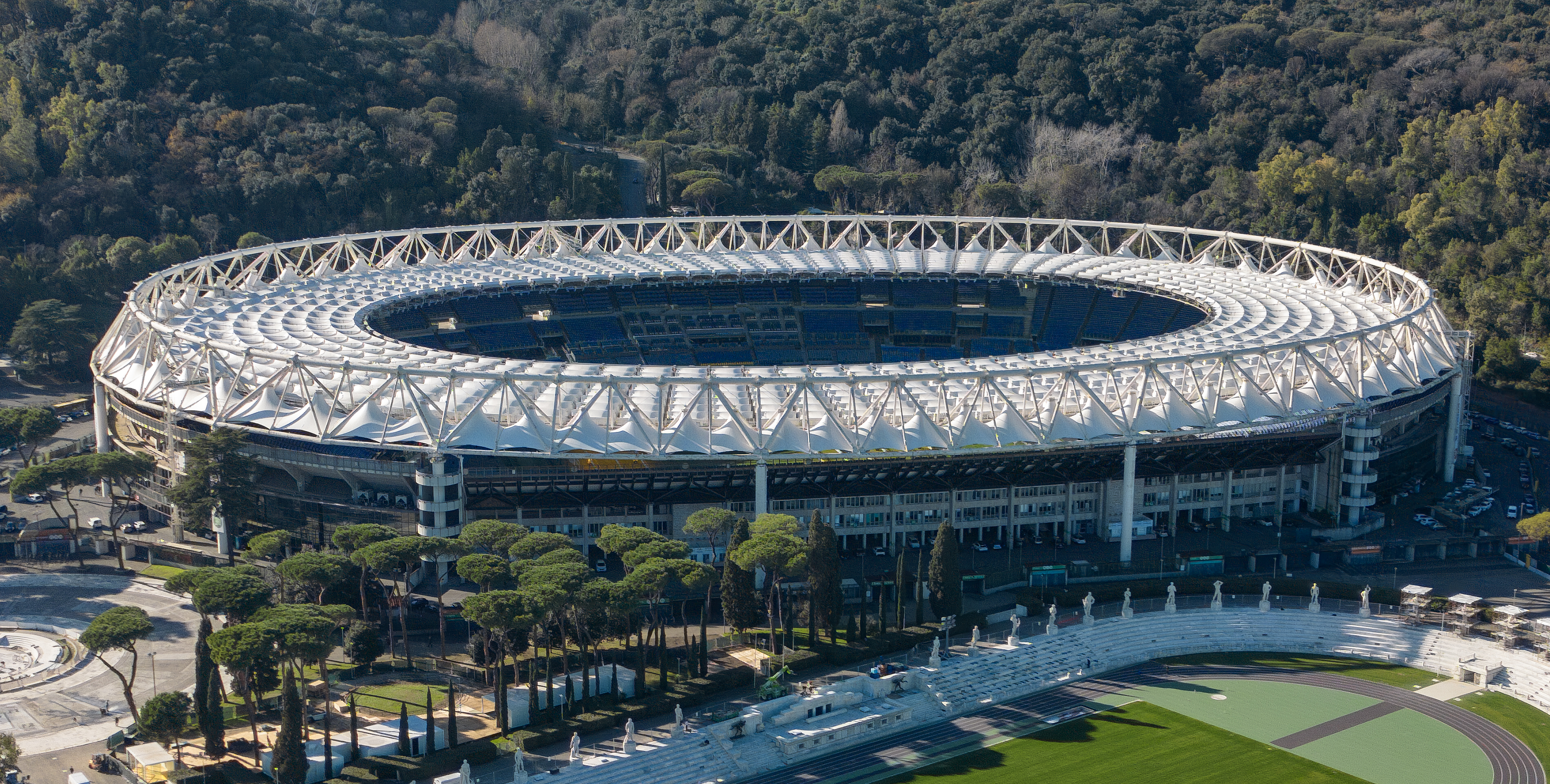
- Level: 2010 Diamond League

The 2010 Golden Gala was the 30th edition of the annual outdoor track and field meeting in Rome, Italy. Held on 10 June at Stadio Olimpico, it was the fourth leg of the 2010 Diamond League – the highest level international track and field circuit.

== Diamond discipline results ==
Podium finishers earned points towards a season leaderboard (4-2-1 respectively), points per event were then doubled in the Diamond League Finals. Athletes had to take part in the Diamond race during the finals to be eligible to win the Diamond trophy which is awarded to the athlete with the most points at the end of the season.

=== Men's ===
200 Metres
Place	Athlete	Nation	Time	Points	Notes
1st place, gold medalist(s)	Walter Dix	United States	19.86	4	MR
2nd place, silver medalist(s)	Wallace Spearmon	United States	20.05	2	
3rd place, bronze medalist(s)	Paul Hession	Ireland	20.60	1	
4	Xavier Carter	United States	20.60		
5	Steve Mullings	Jamaica	20.73		
6	Marlon Devonish	Great Britain	20.79		SB
7	Ainsley Waugh	Jamaica	20.80		
8	Diego Marani	Italy	20.91		PB
9	Marvin Anderson	Jamaica	26.30		
			Wind: (+0.5 m/s)		

400 Metres
Place	Athlete	Nation	Time	Points	Notes
1st place, gold medalist(s)	Jeremy Wariner	United States	44.73	4	WL
2nd place, silver medalist(s)	Angelo Taylor	United States	44.74	2	SB
3rd place, bronze medalist(s)	Chris Brown	Bahamas	45.05	1	SB
4	Renny Quow	Trinidad and Tobago	45.52		
5	Michael Bingham	Great Britain	46.04		
6	Claudio Licciardello	Italy	46.32		
7	Jonathan Borlée	Belgium	46.62		
—	David Neville	United States	DNF		
—	Jermaine Gonzales	Jamaica	DNF		

5000 Metres
Place	Athlete	Nation	Time	Points	Notes
1st place, gold medalist(s)	Imane Merga	Ethiopia	13:00.12	4	
2nd place, silver medalist(s)	Sammy Alex Mutahi	Kenya	13:00.12	2	PB
3rd place, bronze medalist(s)	Moses Ndiema Kipsiro	Uganda	13:00.15	1	
4	Tariku Bekele	Ethiopia	13:00.81		
5	Vincent Chepkok	Kenya	13:01.37		
6	Mathew Kisorio	Kenya	13:02.72		
7	Teklemariam Medhin	Eritrea	13:04.55		PB
8	Bekana Daba	Ethiopia	13:05.20		
9	Leonard Komon	Kenya	13:07.78		
10	Abera Kuma	Ethiopia	13:07.83		PB
11	Lucas Rotich	Kenya	13:11.72		
12	Eliud Kipchoge	Kenya	13:18.30		
13	Micah Kogo	Kenya	13:32.56		
—	Joseph Ebuya	Kenya	DNF		
—	Suleiman Simotwo	Kenya	DNF		PM
—	Bethwell Birgen	Kenya	DNF		PM

110 Metres hurdles
Place	Athlete	Nation	Time	Points	Notes
1st place, gold medalist(s)	Dayron Robles	Cuba	13.14	4	
2nd place, silver medalist(s)	Dwight Thomas	Jamaica	13.31	2	SB
3rd place, bronze medalist(s)	Ryan Brathwaite	Barbados	13.34	1	SB
4	Ryan Wilson	United States	13.37		SB
5	Andy Turner	Great Britain	13.48		
6	David Payne	United States	13.61		
7	Jason Richardson	United States	13.65		
8	Petr Svoboda	Czech Republic	13.86		
9	William Sharman	Great Britain	14.07		
			Wind: (+0.9 m/s)		

Long jump
Place	Athlete	Nation	Distance	Points	Notes
1st place, gold medalist(s)	Dwight Phillips	United States	8.42 m (−0.8 m/s)	4	WL
2nd place, silver medalist(s)	Irving Saladino	Panama	8.13 m (−0.4 m/s)	2	
3rd place, bronze medalist(s)	Fabrice Lapierre	Australia	8.11 m (+0.1 m/s)	1	
4	Brian Johnson	United States	8.06 m (−0.5 m/s)		
5	Ndiss Kaba Badji	Senegal	7.91 m (−0.1 m/s)		
6	Chris Tomlinson	Great Britain	7.79 m (−0.4 m/s)		
7	Michel Tornéus	Sweden	7.79 m (−0.4 m/s)		
8	Emanuele Formichetti	Italy	7.57 m (−0.3 m/s)		
9	Wilfredo Martínez	Cuba	7.49 m (−0.4 m/s)		

Shot put
Place	Athlete	Nation	Distance	Points	Notes
1st place, gold medalist(s)	Christian Cantwell	United States	21.67 m	4	=MR
2nd place, silver medalist(s)	Dylan Armstrong	Canada	21.46 m	2	
3rd place, bronze medalist(s)	Reese Hoffa	United States	21.15 m	1	SB
~~4~~	~~Pavel Lyzhyn~~	~~Belarus~~	~~20.89 m~~		DQ (Note: Due to doping violations Lyzhyn's results between 15 August 2008 and 14 August 2010 were disqualified.)
5	Tomasz Majewski	Poland	20.75 m		
6	Dan Taylor	United States	20.32 m		
7	Ralf Bartels	Germany	20.13 m		
8	Adam Nelson	United States	19.88 m		
9	Yves Niaré	France	19.72 m		

Discus throw
Place	Athlete	Nation	Distance	Points	Notes
1st place, gold medalist(s)	Piotr Małachowski	Poland	68.78 m	4	MR
2nd place, silver medalist(s)	Gerd Kanter	Estonia	67.69 m	2	
3rd place, bronze medalist(s)	Zoltán Kővágó	Hungary	67.26 m	1	
4	Robert Harting	Germany	66.33 m		
5	Ehsan Haddadi	Iran	66.09 m		
6	Gerhard Mayer	Austria	65.24 m		NR
7	Erik Cadée	Netherlands	64.27 m		
8	Virgilijus Alekna	Lithuania	63.47 m		SB
9	Marco Zitelli	Italy	56.68 m		

=== Women's ===
100 Metres
Place	Athlete	Nation	Time	Points	Notes
1st place, gold medalist(s)	LaShauntea Moore	United States	11.04	4	
2nd place, silver medalist(s)	Chandra Sturrup	Bahamas	11.14	2	
3rd place, bronze medalist(s)	Tahesia Harrigan-Scott	British Virgin Islands	11.17	1	
4	Debbie Ferguson-McKenzie	Bahamas	11.31		
5	Gloria Asumnu	United States	11.31		
6	Aleen Bailey	Jamaica	11.40		SB
7	Audrey Alloh	Italy	11.79		
—	Mikele Barber	United States	DQ		R 162.7
—	~~Shelly-Ann Fraser-Pryce~~	~~Jamaica~~	~~DQ~~		R 162.7, (Note: Due to a doping violation Fraser-Pryce's results during this competition were disqualified.)
			Wind: (+0.2 m/s)		

800 Metres
Place	Athlete	Nation	Time	Points	Notes
1st place, gold medalist(s)	Halima Hachlaf	Morocco	1:58.40	4	WL
2nd place, silver medalist(s)	Janeth Jepkosgei	Kenya	1:58.85	2	SB
3rd place, bronze medalist(s)	Jenny Meadows	Great Britain	1:58.89	1	SB
4	Eglė Balčiūnaitė	Lithuania	1:59.54		PB
5	Jemma Simpson	Great Britain	1:59.58		SB
6	Neisha Bernard-Thomas	Grenada	1:59.70		
7	Elisa Cusma	Italy	2:00.11		
8	Yuliya Krevsun	Ukraine	2:00.29		SB
9	Maggie Vessey	United States	2:00.73		SB
10	Daniela Reina	Italy	2:01.09		PB
11	Hazel Clark	United States	2:01.48		
12	Yvonne Hak	Netherlands	2:01.57		
~~13~~	~~Tetiana Petlyuk~~	~~Ukraine~~	~~2:05.06~~		DQ (Note: Due to Abnormalities in Petlyuk's biological passport her results during this comeptition were disqualified.)
—	Dominique Darden	United States	DNF		PM

400 Metres hurdles
Place	Athlete	Nation	Time	Points	Notes
1st place, gold medalist(s)	Lashinda Demus	United States	52.82	4	MR, WL
2nd place, silver medalist(s)	Kaliese Spencer	Jamaica	53.48	2	PB
3rd place, bronze medalist(s)	Natalya Antyukh	Russia	54.00	1	PB
4	Zuzana Hejnová	Czech Republic	54.13		NR
5	Josanne Lucas	Trinidad and Tobago	54.84		SB
6	Anna Jesień	Poland	54.96		SB
7	Angela Moroșanu	Romania	55.70		
8	Muizat Ajoke Odumosu	Nigeria	55.75		
9	Manuela Gentili	Italy	56.06		PB

3000 Metres steeplechase
Place	Athlete	Nation	Time	Points	Notes
1st place, gold medalist(s)	Milcah Chemos Cheywa	Kenya	9:11.71	4	WL
2nd place, silver medalist(s)	Gladys Kipkemoi	Kenya	9:13.22	2	PB
3rd place, bronze medalist(s)	Lydia Rotich	Kenya	9:19.01	1	
4	Sofia Assefa	Ethiopia	9:24.51		
5	Wioletta Frankiewicz	Poland	9:29.68		
6	Mercy Wanjiku	Kenya	9:30.78		PB
7	Katarzyna Kowalska	Poland	9:35.56		
8	Sophie Duarte	France	9:38.55		
9	Ancuța Bobocel	Romania	9:42.18		
10	Karoline Bjerkeli Grøvdal	Norway	9:51.89		
11	Helen Clitheroe	Great Britain	9:57.28		
12	Zenaide Vieira	Brazil	9:59.79		
—	Mardrea Hyman	Jamaica	DNF		PM

High jump
Place	Athlete	Nation	Height	Points	Notes
1st place, gold medalist(s)	Blanka Vlašić	Croatia	2.03 m	4	=MR
2nd place, silver medalist(s)	Chaunté Lowe	United States	2.03 m	2	=MR
3rd place, bronze medalist(s)	Levern Spencer	Saint Lucia	1.95 m	1	
4	Antonietta Di Martino	Italy	1.95 m		
5	Ruth Beitia	Spain	1.95 m		
6	Irina Gordeeva	Russia	1.90 m		=SB
6	Vita Styopina	Ukraine	1.90 m		
8	Emma Green	Sweden	1.90 m		=SB
8	Svetlana Shkolina	Russia	1.90 m		

Pole vault
Place	Athlete	Nation	Height	Points	Notes
1st place, gold medalist(s)	Fabiana Murer	Brazil	4.70 m	4	
2nd place, silver medalist(s)	Silke Spiegelburg	Germany	4.70 m	2	=PB
3rd place, bronze medalist(s)	Jiřina Ptáčníková	Czech Republic	4.60 m	1	
3rd place, bronze medalist(s)	Anna Rogowska	Poland	4.60 m	1	
5	Yuliya Golubchikova	Russia	4.60 m		
6	Tatyana Polnova	Russia	4.50 m		
7	Kate Dennison	Great Britain	4.50 m		=SB
8	Monika Pyrek	Poland	4.40 m		
9	Elena Scarpellini	Italy	4.20 m		=SB
—	Chelsea Johnson	United States	NM		

Triple jump
Place	Athlete	Nation	Distance	Points	Notes
1st place, gold medalist(s)	Yargelis Savigne	Cuba	14.74 m (+0.4 m/s)	4	
2nd place, silver medalist(s)	Olga Rypakova	Kazakhstan	14.74 m (−0.2 m/s)	2	
3rd place, bronze medalist(s)	Olha Saladukha	Ukraine	14.44 m (+0.3 m/s)	1	
4	Simona La Mantia	Italy	14.17 m (−0.7 m/s)		
4	Anna Pyatykh	Russia	14.38 m (+0.1 m/s)		
5	Nadezhda Alekhina	Russia	14.05 m (−0.1 m/s)		
6	Katja Demut	Germany	13.94 m (−0.5 m/s)		
7	Magdelín Martínez	Italy	13.89 m (−0.4 m/s)		
8	Trecia-Kaye Smith	Jamaica	13.51 m (−1.4 m/s)		

Javelin throw
Place	Athlete	Nation	Distance	Points	Notes
1st place, gold medalist(s)	Barbora Špotáková	Czech Republic	68.66 m	4	MR
2nd place, silver medalist(s)	Sunette Viljoen	South Africa	63.04 m	2	
3rd place, bronze medalist(s)	Vera Rebrik	Ukraine	62.44 m	1	SB
4	Christina Obergföll	Germany	62.36 m		
5	Linda Stahl	Germany	62.02 m		
6	Martina Ratej	Slovenia	62.01 m		
7	Goldie Sayers	Great Britain	61.23 m		
8	Jarmila Jurkovičová	Czech Republic	59.48 m		
9	Zahra Bani	Italy	57.14 m		

== Promotional events results ==
=== Men's ===
100 Metres
Place	Athlete	Nation	Time	Notes
1st place, gold medalist(s)	Asafa Powell	Jamaica	9.82	WL
2nd place, silver medalist(s)	Christophe Lemaitre	France	10.09	
3rd place, bronze medalist(s)	Martial Mbandjock	France	10.09	
4	Jaysuma Saidy Ndure	Norway	10.17	
5	Lerone Clarke	Jamaica	10.19	
6	Mario Forsythe	Jamaica	10.25	
7	Simone Collio	Italy	10.29	
8	Mark Lewis-Francis	Great Britain	10.30	
9	Ronald Pognon	France	10.32	
			Wind: (+0.6 m/s)	

1500 Metres
Place	Athlete	Nation	Time	Notes
1st place, gold medalist(s)	Augustine Kiprono Choge	Kenya	3:32.21	
2nd place, silver medalist(s)	Daniel Kipchirchir Komen	Kenya	3:33.08	
3rd place, bronze medalist(s)	Geoffrey Rono	Kenya	3:33.89	
4	Antar Zerguelaïne	Algeria	3:34.82	
5	Gideon Gathimba	Kenya	3:34.92	
6	İlham Tanui Özbilen	Kenya	3:34.92	
7		Spain	3:35.06	
8	Juan Carlos Higuero	Spain	3:35.10	
9	Yoann Kowal	France	3:35.14	
10	Mekonnen Gebremedhin	Ethiopia	3:35.40	
11	Andy Baddeley	Great Britain	3:35.50	
12	Boaz Kiplagat Lalang	Kenya	3:35.80	
13	Belal Mansoor Ali	Bahrain	3:35.83	
14	Nixon Chepseba	Kenya	3:37.12	
15	Tarek Boukensa	Algeria	3:41.33	
—	Abdalaati Iguider	Morocco	DNF	
—	Collins Cheboi	Kenya	DNF	PM
—	Philemon Kimutai	Kenya	DNF	PM

== See also ==
- 2010 Diamond League
