= Fred Kerley =

American sprinter (born 1995)

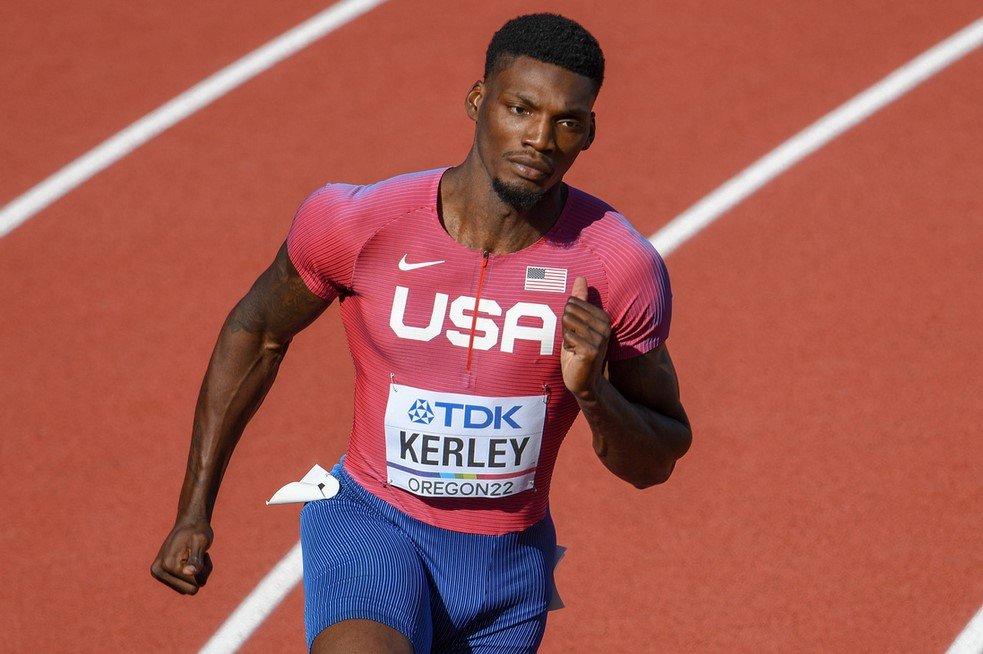
- Kerley at the 2022 World Athletics Championships in Eugene

Personal information
- Full name: Fredrick Lee Kerley
- Born: May 7, 1995 (age 31) San Antonio, Texas, U.S.
- Home town: Taylor, Texas, U.S.
- Height: 6 ft 3 in (191 cm)
- Weight: 205 lb (93 kg)

Sport
- Country: United States
- Sport: Track and field
- Event: Sprints
- College team: Texas A&M Aggies (2016–2017); South Plains College Texans (2014–2015)
- Turned pro: June 2017
- Coached by: Quincy Watts

Achievements and titles
- Highest world ranking: 1st (100 m, weeks 58)
- Personal bests: 100 m: 9.76 (Eugene 2022); 200 m: 19.76 A (Nairobi 2021); 400 m: 43.64 (Des Moines 2019)
Medal record
Men's athletics
Representing the United States
Olympic Games
Silver medal – second place	2020 Tokyo	100 m
Bronze medal – third place	2024 Paris	100 m
World Championships
Gold medal – first place	2019 Doha	4 × 400 m relay
Gold medal – first place	2022 Eugene	100 m
Gold medal – first place	2023 Budapest	4 × 100 m relay
Silver medal – second place	2017 London	4 × 400 m relay
Bronze medal – third place	2019 Doha	400 m
World Indoor Championships
Silver medal – second place	2018 Birmingham	4 × 400 m relay
Diamond League
First place	2018	400 m
First place	2021	100 m
NACAC U23 Championships
Gold medal – first place	2016 San Salvador	4 × 100 m relay

Fredrick Lee Kerley (/ˈkɜːrli/ KUR-lee; born May 7, 1995) is an American track and field sprinter. He was the Olympic silver medalist over 100 m at the 2020 Olympics and bronze medalist at the 2024 Olympics in the same event. Kerley has earned an additional six medals at the World Championships, most notably 100 m gold at the 2022 edition. He has also medalled in the 400 m, 4 × 100 m relay, and 4 × 400 m relay and won eleven Diamond League races, including two Diamond League finals – the 400 m in 2018 and the 100 m in 2021.

His personal best time of 43.64 seconds makes him the tenth fastest man in history over 400 meters. During the pandemic, Kerley chose to focus on the 100 m during the Olympic cycle to improve his basic speed for future attempts at a sub-43 400 m. The decision to move down paid off as he won the silver medal in the 100 m at the 2020 Tokyo Olympics with a 9.84 performance. His personal best time of 9.76 seconds makes him the seventh fastest man in history over the straightaway sprint, behind Usain Bolt, Yohan Blake, Tyson Gay, Asafa Powell, Justin Gatlin, Kishane Thompson and joint with Christian Coleman and Trayvon Bromell.

Kerley is one of only three men along with Michael Norman and Wayde van Niekerk to go sub-10 seconds in 100 m, sub-20 seconds in 200 m and sub-44 seconds in 400 m.

== Early life and college ==
Kerley attended Taylor High School and his youth team was the College Station Sprinters in College Station, Texas. Afterwards he attended South Plains College from 2013 to 2015 before transferring to Texas A&M.

In 2016, Fred Kerley tried out for the Olympic team at the USA Olympic Trials. He did not qualify out of his heat, but he went on to represent the United States at the NACAC Under-23 Championships where he anchored the 4 × 100 meters relay team to gold.

In March 2017, he won the 400 m at the NCAA Division I Championships in a world leading time of 44.85 s, one of the top ten fastest indoor times ever. He joined his younger brother Mylik Kerley as he anchored the Aggies to a come from behind victory in the 4 × 400 m relay. The two first-place finishes contributed 20 points to the team, helping bring Texas A&M to their first ever team victory at the NCAA Track and Field Championships, run on their home track. In May, Kerley ran 44.09 s, just 0.09 s off the NCAA record, while easing to the finish line at the Southeastern Conference (SEC) Championships in Columbia, South Carolina. A few weeks later Kerley set the NCAA record in the men's 400 m at the 2017 NCAA West Preliminary with a time of 43.70 s, taking three-tenths of a second off the 44.00 record by Olympic champion Quincy Watts, set almost 25 years earlier. Kerley had met Watts just before the race. He concluded his amateur career to win the 400 m and 4 × 400 m relay at the 2017 NCAA Division I Championships in June.

== Professional career ==
=== 2017 ===
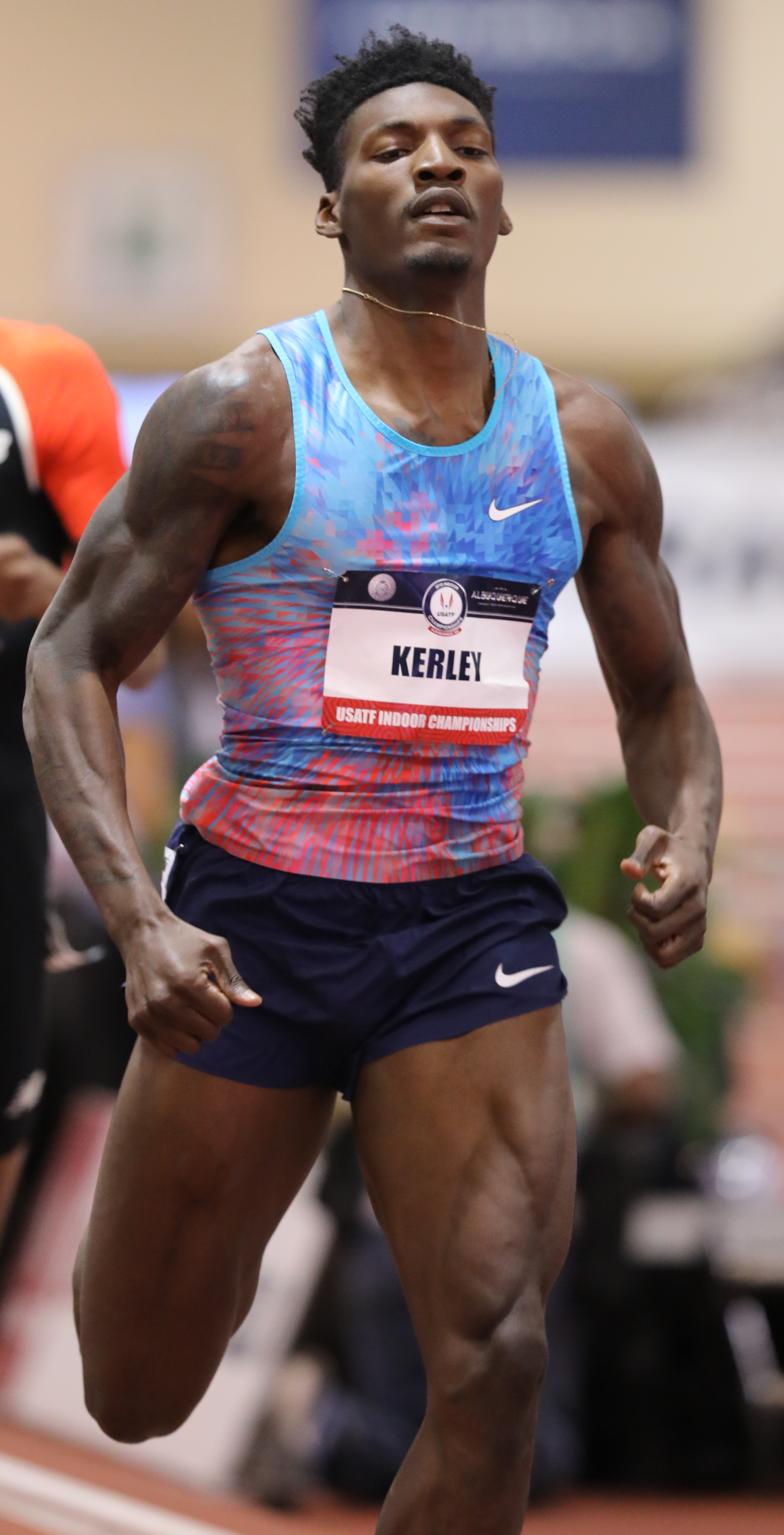
Kerley at the 2018 USATF Indoor Championships

A few weeks after turning professional and signing with Nike, Kerley won the 400 m at the USATF Championships in 44.03 seconds, qualifying to represent the United States in both the 400 m and the 4 × 400 m relay at the World Championships in London. After winning his heat he finished third in his semi, but qualified for the final on time. In the final he was unable to replicate his form from earlier in the season, finishing seventh in a time of 45.23 s. He came back a day later to help the US qualify for the finals in the relay, and then a few days later earned a silver medal behind Trinidad and Tobago.

=== 2018 ===
Training under Kevin Tyler with widely renowned club ALTIS in Phoenix, Arizona, Kerley finished 3rd in the 400m at the 2018 US Indoor Championships, failing to qualify for the individual 400m at the upcoming World Indoor Championships but making it onto the 4 × 400 m relay team. There, he helped the team to a silver medal finish.

Outdoors, Kerley ran several races across the international circuit, including a win in the 400 m at the Rome Diamond League. However, none of his times came close to his 43.70 personal best. Despite suffering an injury in June, Kerley bounced back in August to win at the Birmingham Diamond League, before winning the Diamond League trophy for the men's 400 meters in Zurich. After the season, he returned to Texas A&M to train under Alleyne Francique, stating to Track & Field News, "I believe in him so much that I had to come back to train with him."

=== 2019 ===
In May, Kerley was selected to compete for the US in the 4 × 400 m relay at the IAAF World Relays, but the team was disqualified in the final. He won over 400 m at the Shanghai Diamond League with a time of 44.81 s, and followed it up with another win at the Racers Grand Prix in Kingston, Jamaica. A month later, Kerley won the US title in a new personal best of 43.64 seconds, making him the 7th fastest man on the all-time rankings at the time. At the World Championships in Doha, Kerley won the bronze medal in the 400 m with a time of 44.17 s. He also helped the US to win gold in the men's 4 × 400 m relay.

=== 2021 ===
After the COVID-19 pandemic caused the cancellation of the 2020 season and delayed the 2020 Summer Olympics by a year, Kerley kicked off his 2021 season with several 100 m races in order to work on his speed for the longer sprint; he broke the historic 10-second barrier at the TRUfit Classic in Miami on April 24, winning in 9.91 s (+2.0 m/s). On May 19, he won the men's 100 m in 9.96 s at the Golden Spike in Ostrava, finishing ahead of former Olympic and World champion Justin Gatlin who settled for second in 10.08 s. Kerley also ran in the 200 m where he placed second with a time of 20.27 s, trailing Kenny Bednarek from the start who won in 19.93 s. According to Reuters, Kerley was satisfied with his performances, but thought there was more work to do in his 200 m and his focus for the Olympic Trials would be 400 m. However, despite finishing third over 400 m at the Doha Diamond League and winning at the FBK Games, he decided to focus on the 100 m and 200 m at the Trials due to his ankle swelling on the turns. Kerley also stated that the popularity of the 100 m was another factor in his switch.

Despite online backlash for his decision, Kerley silenced doubters by finishing third in the 100 m at the Trials, qualifying for his first Olympic team. In the 200 m, Kerley struggled through the rounds due to the turns and their impact on his ankles, and he narrowly qualified for the final on time. However, he managed to finish an impressive fourth with his first sub-20 s performance; this made him the 3rd athlete to join the "Sub 10s, 20s, 44s club for the 100m, 200m & 400m sprints", behind 400 m World Record holder Wayde van Niekerk & Michael Norman.

At the Olympics in Tokyo, Kerley won the silver medal in the 100 m, finishing behind Marcell Jacobs. He also ran in the heats of the 4 × 100 m relay as the US were eliminated in the heats. Following the Olympics, Kerley placed second at the Prefontaine Classic over 100 m and at the Laussane Diamond League over 200 m. He set a new personal best of 19.79 s over 200 m in winning the Paris Diamond League. At the Diamond League Final in Zurich, Kerley won the 100 m in a time of 9.87 s and placed third over 200 m in 19.83 s. He ended his season in September by winning over 200 m at the Kip Keino Classic in Nairobi, running a time of 19.79 s.

=== 2022 ===
In April, Kerley won over 200 m at the USATF Golden Games in 19.80 s, narrowly beating Michael Norman who ran 19.83 s. On 13 May, Kerley competed in his first Diamond League of the season in Doha, placing second in the 200 m. He also placed second over 100 m at the Prefontaine Classic, running 9.98 s to finish behind Trayvon Bromell. On 28 May, Kerley won the 100 m at the Rome Diamond League in 9.92 s.

At the 2022 US Outdoor Championships, Kerley won the 100 m in 9.77 seconds. Kerley ran 9.76 seconds, a personal best, in the semi-final. He went on to place third in the 200 m in 19.83 seconds.

While competing in the 2022 World Athletics Championships, Kerley won his maiden individual World Championship gold medal in the 100 m. In the final, Kerley pipped compatriot Marvin Bracy on the line with a time of 9.86 seconds to win. Fellow American Trayvon Bromell finished third, completing a clean sweep. He was knocked out of the 200 m in the semi-final.

=== 2023 ===
Kerley enjoyed a strong start to his 2023 season, taking home a win over 100 m at the Golden Grand Prix in Yokohama as well as in the Rabat, and Florence Diamond Leagues, he also won over 200 m at the Doha Diamond League.

At the US Outdoor Championships, Kerley contested only the 200 m as he had already qualified for the 100 m at the 2023 World Championships due to being the reigning World Champion. He placed fourth in the final of the 200 m to Erriyon Knighton, Kenny Bednarek, and Courtney Lindsey. Later in July, he placed second over 100 m in the Silesia Diamond League.

Kerley went out in the semi-finals of the 100 m at the 2023 World Athletics Championships. However, he earned gold as a member of the USA's 4 × 100 m relay team.

In September, soon after his third-place finish in the Xiamen Diamond League 100 m, Kerley announced that he was no longer coached by Alleyne Francique and would be coached by Quincy Watts, the Director of Track and Field at the University of Southern California.

=== 2024–present ===
On February 4, Kerley ran a personal best of 6.55 s over 60 m at the New Balance Indoor Grand Prix. In a tweet on May 14, Kerley announced that the next time he raced the 100 meter distance, he planned to break Usain Bolt's world record of 9.58 seconds. On June 9, Kerley was scheduled to compete in the 100 meters at the New York City Grand Prix, but forfeited the race due to apparent faulty starting blocks. After the race, he parted ways with his sponsor Asics.

On June 23, Kerley finished third in the 100 meter final at the U.S. Olympic Trials, behind Noah Lyles and Kenny Bednarek. At the 2024 Summer Olympics, Kerley was the bronze medalist in the 100 meters, finishing in a time of 9.81 seconds behind Kishane Thompson and Noah Lyles.

On August 25, Kerley set a new meet record in the 100 meters at the Kamila Skolimowska Memorial, with a time of 9.87 seconds. At the Diamond League Final in Brussels, Kerley placed third over 100 m and fifth over 200 m.

In September 2024, it was announced that he had signed up for the inaugural season of the Michael Johnson founded Grand Slam Track. He competed in the Kingston Slam but missed the Miami Slam due to being arrested and charged with battery on May 1, 2025. He was later released on bond.

In July 2025, Kerley announced that he would miss the 2025 USA Outdoor Track and Field Championships.

Following a provisional suspension by the Athletics Integrity Unit that commenced in August 2025, Kerley was issued a two-year ban set to expire in August 2027 by the United States Anti-Doping Agency for whereabouts failures, i.e. missing three doping tests. All of his results from December 2024 to August 2025 were disqualified.

In September 2025, it was announced that he was joining the Enhanced Games.

== Statistics ==
Information from World Athletics profile unless otherwise noted.

=== Personal bests ===
Surface	Event	Time	Venue	Date	Notes
Outdoor	400 meters	43.64	Des Moines, United States	July 27, 2019	#8 all-time
Outdoor	200 meters	19.76 A	Nairobi, Kenya	September 18, 2021	+2.0 m/s wind, #22 all-time
Outdoor	100 meters	9.76	Eugene, United States	June 24, 2022	+1.8 m/s, #6 all-time
Outdoor	4 × 400 m relay	2:56.69	Doha, Qatar	October 6, 2019	2019 WL
Outdoor	4 × 200 m relay	1:21.11	Austin, United States	April 2, 2016	
Outdoor	4 × 100 m relay	38.63	San Salvador, El Salvador	July 16, 2017	
Indoor	400 meters	44.85	College Station, United States	March 11, 2017	Indoor 2017 WL, #7 all-time
Indoor	200 meters	20.58	Fayetteville, United States	January 27, 2017	
Indoor	4 × 400 m relay	3:01.97	Birmingham, United Kingdom	March 4, 2018	

=== International championship results ===
Representing the United States
Year	Competition	Venue	Position	Event	Time	
2016	NACAC U23 Championships	San Salvador, El Salvador	8th (semis)	200 m	21.17	+0.7 m/s wind, q (Note: Qualified for the final, but did not start (DNS) in the final.)
2016	NACAC U23 Championships	San Salvador, El Salvador	1st	4 × 100 m relay	38.63	PB
2017	World Championships	London, United Kingdom	7th	400 m	45.23	
2017	World Championships	London, United Kingdom	2nd	4 × 400 m relay	2:58.61	PB
2018	World Indoor Championships	Birmingham, United Kingdom	2nd	4 × 400 m relay	3:01.97	#2 all-time (Note: Shared with Michael Cherry, Aldrich Bailey, and Vernon Norwood for the United States. Kerley was the first carrier before Cherry.)
2019	World Relays	Yokohama, Japan	DQ	4 × 400 m relay	—	Lane violation
2019	World Championships	Doha, Qatar	3rd	400 m	44.17	
2019	World Championships	Doha, Qatar	1st	4 × 400 m relay	2:56.69	WL, PB (Note: Shared with Michael Cherry, Wil London, and Rai Benjamin for the United States. Kerley was the first carrier before Cherry.)
2021	Olympic Games	Tokyo, Japan	2nd	100 m	9.84	+0.1 m/s wind, PB
2022	World Championships	Eugene, United States	1st	100 m	9.86	-0.1 m/s wind
2022	World Championships	Eugene, United States	20th (sf)	200 m	20.68	-0.1 m/s wind
2023	World Championships	Budapest, Hungary	9th (sf)	100 m	10.02	-0.3 m/s wind
2023	World Championships	Budapest, Hungary	1st	4 × 100 m relay	37.38	
2024	Olympic Games	Paris, France	3rd	100 m	9.81	+1.0 m/s wind

=== Circuit wins and titles ===
Grand Slam Track results
Slam	Race group	Event	Pl.	Time	Prize money
2025 Kingston Slam	Short sprints	100 m	7th	10.30	US$25,000
2025 Kingston Slam	Short sprints	200 m	3rd	20.39	US$25,000

- Diamond League 400 meters champion: 2018
- Diamond League 100 meters champion: 2021
  - 2018 (400 m): Rome Golden Gala (SB), Birmingham Grand Prix, Zürich Weltklasse
  - 2019 (400 m): Shanghai Diamond League (SB)
  - 2021: Paris Meeting (200 m, PB), Brussels Memorial Van Damme (100 m), Zürich (100 m)
  - 2022 (100 m): Rome
- World Indoor Tour
  - 2018: Glasgow Indoor Grand Prix

=== National championship results ===
Representing South Plains College Texans (2014–2015), Texas A&M Aggies (2016–2017), Nike (2018–2022), and Asics (2023-2024)
Year	Competition	Venue	Position	Event	Time	
2014	NJCAA Division I Championships	Mesa, Arizona	6th	400 m	46.84	
2014	NJCAA Division I Championships	Mesa, Arizona	2nd	4 × 400 m relay	3:05.86	
2014	USATF Junior Championships	Eugene, Oregon	8th	400 m	47.49	
2015	NJCAA Indoor Championships	Albuquerque, New Mexico	2nd	400 m	47.15	SB
2015	NJCAA Indoor Championships	Albuquerque, New Mexico	2nd	4 × 400 m relay	3:12.56	
2015	NJCAA Division I Championships	Hutchinson, Kansas	11th	400 m	47.81	
2015	NJCAA Division I Championships	Hutchinson, Kansas	3rd (semis)	4 × 400 m relay	3:11.75	q (Note: South Plains placed third in the final, but it is not clear from the Track & Field Results Reporting System who ran for the team in the final.)
2016	NCAA Division I Indoor Championships	Birmingham, Alabama	8th	4 × 400 m relay	3:07.49	
2016	NCAA Division I Championships	Eugene, Oregon	13th	400 m	45.99	
2016	NCAA Division I Championships	Eugene, Oregon	DNF (semi 1)	4 × 100 m relay	—	
2016	NCAA Division I Championships	Eugene, Oregon	4th	4 × 400 m relay	3:03.94	
2016	US Olympic Trials	Eugene, Oregon	27th	400 m	46.70	
2017	NCAA Division I Indoor Championships	College Station, Texas	1st	400 m	44.85	WL, PB
2017	NCAA Division I Indoor Championships	College Station, Texas	1st	4 × 400 m relay	3:02.80	
2017	NCAA Division I Championships	Eugene, Oregon	1st	400 m	44.10	
2017	NCAA Division I Championships	Eugene, Oregon	4th	4 × 100 m relay	38.72	SB
2017	NCAA Division I Championships	Eugene, Oregon	1st	4 × 400 m relay	2:59.98	
2017	USATF Championships	Sacramento, California	1st	400 m	44.03	
2018	USATF Indoor Championships	Albuquerque, New Mexico	5th	400 m	45.63	A
2019	USATF Championships	Des Moines, Iowa	1st	400 m	43.64	PB
2021	US Olympic Trials	Eugene, Oregon	3rd	100 m	9.86	+0.8 m/s wind, PB
2021	US Olympic Trials	Eugene, Oregon	4th	200 m	19.90	+0.3 m/s wind, PB
2022	USATF Championships	Eugene, Oregon	1st	100 m	9.77	+1.8 m/s wind
2022	USATF Championships	Eugene, Oregon	3rd	200 m	19.83	-0.3 m/s wind
2023	USATF Championships	Eugene, Oregon	4th	200 m	19.86	-0.1 m/s wind
2024	US Olympic Trials	Eugene, Oregon	3rd	100 m	9.88	+0.4 m/s wind

- NCAA results from Track & Field Results Reporting System.

=== 400 meters seasonal bests ===
Year	Time	Venue	Date
2014	46.38	Mesa, United States	May 16
2015	47.15	Albuquerque, United States	March 7
2016	45.10	Tempe, United States	April 9
2017	43.70	Austin, United States	May 26
2018	44.33	Rome, Italy	May 31
2019	43.64	Des Moines, United States	July 27
2021	44.60	Doha, Qatar	May 28
2022	44.47	St. George's, Grenada	March 5

== Personal life ==
Kerley's older cousin is former NFL wide receiver Jeremy Kerley. Kerley has three children with his estranged wife Angelica Taylor. He dated fellow athlete Alaysha Johnson in 2024. He has been in a relationship with DJ Sky High Baby since 2025.

In July 2025, Kerley converted to Islam.

== Legal issues ==
Kerley was charged in spring 2024 with domestic violence and robbery.

Kerley was arrested in Miami Beach on January 2, 2025, after a confrontation with police escalated into a physical altercation. Authorities released bodycam footage showing Kerley arguing with officers near an active investigation scene on 9th Street, where he expressed concern about his parked vehicle. Police instructed him to leave the area, but he refused, leading to a shoving match.

In May 2025, Kerley was arrested and charged with battery ahead of a planned appearance at a Grand Slam Track meet in Miami. All charges were dropped following an agreement requiring the completion of a six-month pre-trial diversion program. "They put me through hell, but truth walked me home. Cases dismissed," Kerley wrote on Instagram.
