= Golden Gala =

Athletics tournament held in Rome, Italy

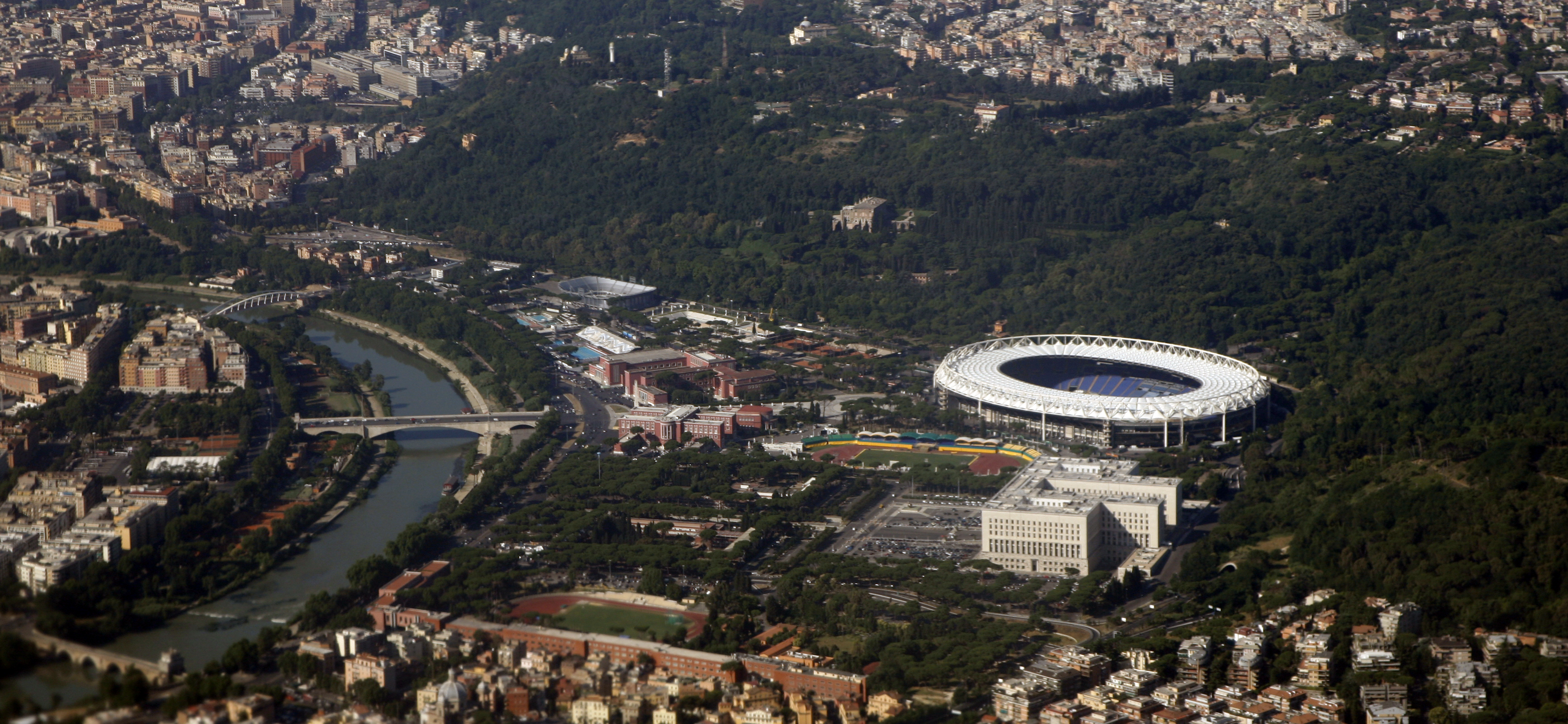
- The Stadio Olimpico hosts the event
- Date: May – September
- Location: Rome, Italy
- Event type: Track and field
- World Athletics Cat.: GW
- Established: 5 August 1980; 46 years ago
- Website: Diamond League Rome
- 2026 Golden Gala

Logo

Golden Gala is an annual track and field event normally held at the Olympic Stadium in Rome, Italy. Previously one of the IAAF Golden League events, it is now part of the Diamond League. Following the 2013 death of Italian sprinting legend Pietro Mennea, the organizers added his name to the title of the meet.

The 2021 and 2023 events were temporarily relocated to Florence.

== History ==
Primo Nebiolo, the Italian president of IAAF since 1981, was the founder of the Golden Gala and had the idea to bring the athletes and the people from the United States and the NATO countries together after their boycott of the Moscow Olympics in 1980 as a result of the Soviet invasion of Afghanistan. Nebiolo died of a heart attack at age 76 in 1999.

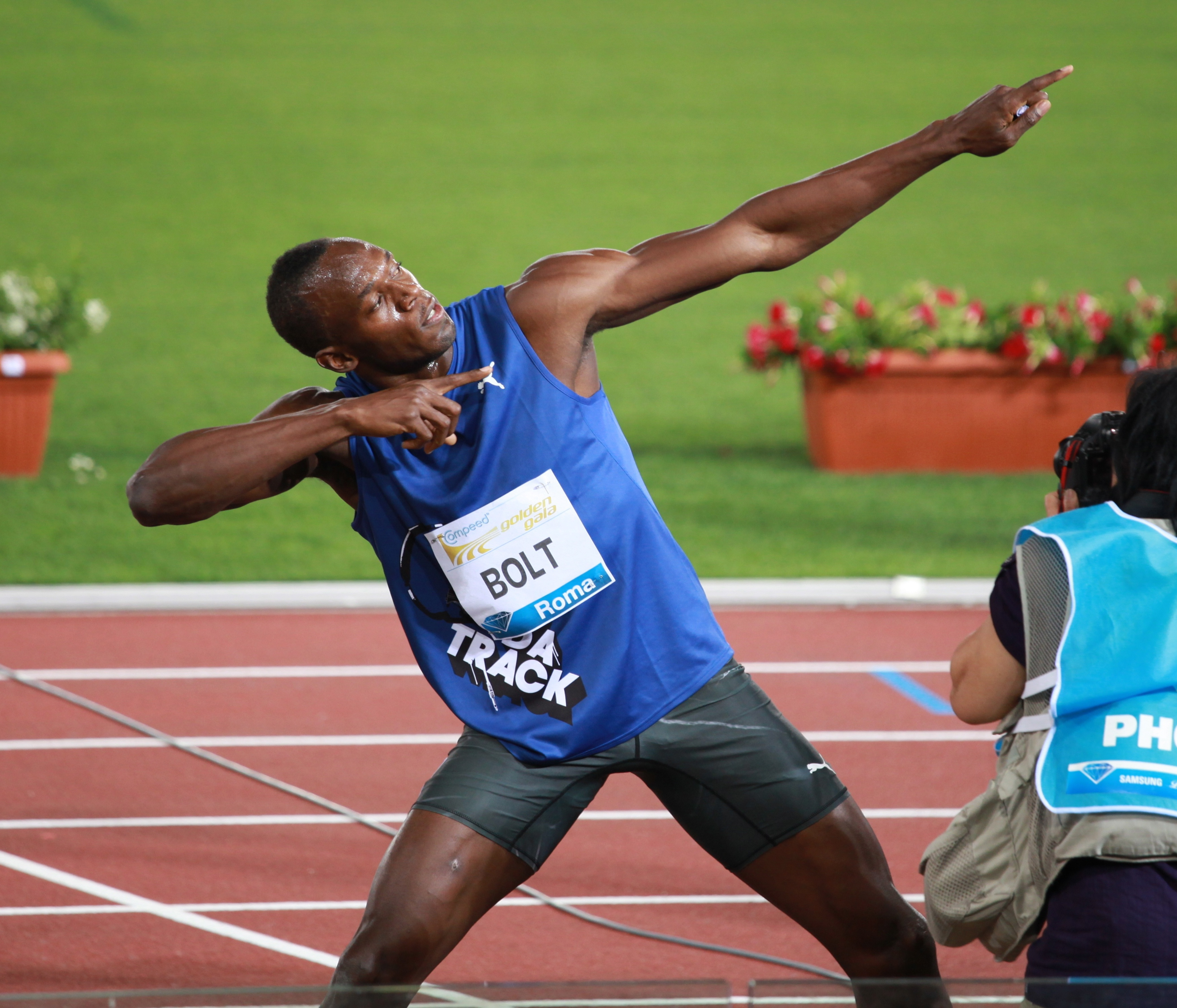
Usain Bolt at the 2011 Golden Gala

At the 2009 edition of the Golden Gala, Kenenisa Bekele, Kerron Stewart, Sanya Richards and Yelena Isinbayeva all remained on target for the 2009 Golden League jackpot. In the 100 m, Tyson Gay equalled his American record and Daniel Bailey set an Antiguan record in the men's race. Antonietta Di Martino brought the sole Italian victory in Rome by beating off favourite Blanka Vlašić in the high jump.

== Editions ==
In 1981 the IAAF World Cup was held in Rome, so no Golden Gala meeting was organized.

Golden Gala editions
Ed.	Meeting	Series	Date	Ref.
1st	1980 Golden Gala		5 Aug 1980	
2nd	1982 Golden Gala		14 Sep 1982	
4th	1983 Golden Gala		1 Sep 1983	
4th	1984 Golden Gala		31 Aug 1984	
5th	1985 Golden Gala	1985 IAAF Grand Prix	9 Jul 1985	
6th	1986 Golden Gala	1986 IAAF Grand Prix	10 Sep 1986	
7th	1987 Golden Gala	1987 IAAF Grand Prix	22 Jul 1987	
8th	1988 Golden Gala	1988 IAAF Grand Prix	27 Jul 1988	
9th	1989 Golden Gala	1989 IAAF Grand Prix	19 Jul 1989	
10th	1990 Golden Gala	1990 IAAF Grand Prix	18 Jul 1990	
11th	1991 Golden Gala	1991 IAAF Grand Prix	17 Jul 1991	
12th	1992 Golden Gala	1992 IAAF Grand Prix	9 Jun 1992	
13th	1993 Golden Gala	1993 IAAF Grand Prix	9 Jun 1993	
14th	1994 Golden Gala	1994 IAAF Grand Prix	8 Jun 1994	
15th	1995 Golden Gala	1995 IAAF Grand Prix	8 Jun 1995	
16th	1996 Golden Gala	1996 IAAF Grand Prix	5 Jun 1996	
17th	1997 Golden Gala	1997 IAAF Grand Prix	5 Jun 1997	
18th	1998 Golden Gala	1998 IAAF Golden League	14 Jul 1998	
19th	1999 Golden Gala	1999 IAAF Golden League	7 Jul 1999	
20th	2000 Golden Gala	2000 IAAF Golden League	30 Jun 2000	
21st	2001 Golden Gala	2001 IAAF Golden League	29 Jun 2001	
22nd	2002 Golden Gala	2002 IAAF Golden League	12 Jul 2002	
23rd	2003 Golden Gala	2003 IAAF Golden League	11 Jul 2003	
24th	2004 Golden Gala	2004 IAAF Golden League	2 Jul 2004	
25th	2005 Golden Gala	2005 IAAF Golden League	8 Jul 2005	
26th	2006 Golden Gala	2006 IAAF Golden League	14 Jul 2006	
27th	2007 Golden Gala	2007 IAAF Golden League	13 Jul 2007	
28th	2008 Golden Gala	2008 IAAF Golden League	11 Jul 2008	
29th	2009 Golden Gala	2009 IAAF Golden League	10 Jul 2009	
30th	2010 Golden Gala	2010 Diamond League	10 Jun 2010	
31st	2011 Golden Gala	2011 Diamond League	26 May 2011	
32nd	2012 Golden Gala	2012 Diamond League	31 May 2012	
33rd	2013 Golden Gala	2013 Diamond League	6 Jun 2013	
34th	2014 Golden Gala	2014 Diamond League	5 Jun 2014	
35th	2015 Golden Gala	2015 Diamond League	4 Jun 2015	
36th	2016 Golden Gala	2016 Diamond League	2 Jun 2016	
37th	2017 Golden Gala	2017 Diamond League	8 Jun 2017	
38th	2018 Golden Gala	2018 Diamond League	31 May 2018	
39th	2019 Golden Gala	2019 Diamond League	6 Jun 2019	
40th	2020 Golden Gala	2020 Diamond League	17 Sep 2020	
41st	2021 Golden Gala	2021 Diamond League	10 Jun 2021	
42nd	2022 Golden Gala	2022 Diamond League	9 Jun 2022	
43rd	2023 Golden Gala	2023 Diamond League	2 Jun 2023	
44th	2024 Golden Gala	2024 Diamond League	30 Aug 2024	
45th	2025 Golden Gala	2025 Diamond League	6 Jun 2025	
46th	2026 Golden Gala	2026 Diamond League	4 Jun 2026	

== World records ==
Over the course of its history, ten world records have been set at the Gala. The 1500 metres and Mile records by Hicham El Guerrouj still stand. In 2014 Joanne Pavey's 15:04.87 in the 5000 metres bettered the existing masters world record in the W40 division by almost 16 seconds.

World records set at the Golden Gala
Year	Event	Record	Athlete	Nationality
1983	Pole vault	5.83 m	Thierry Vigneron	France
1984	Pole vault	5.94 m	Sergey Bubka	Soviet Union
1984	Pole vault	5.91 m	Thierry Vigneron	France
1987	5000 m	12:58.39	Saïd Aouita	Morocco
1995	5000 m	12:55.30	Moses Kiptanui	Kenya
1998	1500 m	3:26.00	Hicham El Guerrouj	Morocco
1999	Mile	3:43.13	Hicham El Guerrouj	Morocco
2000	Javelin throw	68.22 m	Trine Hattestad	Norway
2008	Pole vault	5.03 m	Yelena Isinbayeva	Russia
2023	1500 m	3:49.11	Faith Kipyegon	Kenya

== Meeting records ==
=== Men ===
Men's meeting records of the Golden Gala
Event	Record	Athlete	Nationality	Date	Meet	Ref.
100 m	9.75 (+0.9 m/s)	Justin Gatlin	United States	4 June 2015	2015	
200 m	19.70 (+0.7 m/s)	Michael Norman	United States	6 June 2019	2019	
400 m	43.62	Jeremy Wariner	United States	14 July 2006	2006	
800 m	1:42.79	Wilson Kipketer	Denmark	7 July 1999	1999	
1500 m	3:26.00 WR	Hicham El Guerrouj	Morocco	14 July 1998	1998	
Mile	3:43.13 WR	Hicham El Guerrouj	Morocco	7 July 1999	1999	
2000 m	4:54.02	Vénuste Niyongabo	Burundi	8 June 1995	1995	
3000 m	7:26.64	Jacob Kiplimo	Uganda	17 September 2020	2020	
5000 m	12:46.33	Nicholas Kimeli	Kenya	9 June 2022	2022	
10,000 m	28:59.82	Mark Donahue	USA	10 September 1986	1986	
110 m hurdles	12.98 (+0.5 m/s)	Trey Cunningham	United States	4 June 2026	2026	
400 m hurdles	47.07	Karsten Warholm	Norway	17 September 2020	2020	
3000 m steeplechase	7:54.31	Paul Kipsiele Koech	Kenya	31 May 2012	2012	
High jump	2.41 m	Mutaz Essa Barshim	Qatar	5 June 2014	2014	
Pole vault	6.15 m	Armand Duplantis	Sweden	17 September 2020	2020	
Long jump	8.61 m (±0.0 m/s)	Dwight Phillips	United States	10 July 2009	2009	
Triple jump	17.96 m (−0.4 m/s)	Pedro Pichardo	Cuba	4 June 2015	2015	
Shot put	22.49 m	Ryan Crouser	United States	30 August 2024	2024	
Discus throw	70.72 m	Kristjan Ceh	Slovenia	9 June 2022	2022	
Hammer throw	84.88 m	Sergey Litvinov	Soviet Union	10 September 1986	1986	
Javelin throw	92.62 m	Rumesh Tharanga	Sri Lanka	4 June 2026	2026	
3000 m (walk)	10:57.77	Francesco Fortunato	Italy	9 June 2022	2022	
4 × 100 m relay	38.31	Santa Monica Track Club: Michael Marsh; Leroy Burrell; Floyd Heard; Carl Lewis	United States	8 June 1994	1994	
4 × 400 m relay	3:01.76 DLR	Nigel Levine; Conrad Williams; Chris Clarke; Jack Green	Great Britain	31 May 2012	2012	

=== Women ===
Women's meeting records of the Golden Gala
Event	Record	Athlete	Nationality	Date	Meet	Ref.
100 m	10.75 (+0.6 m/s)	Marion Jones	United States	14 July 1998	1998	
100 m	10.75 (+0.4 m/s)	Kerron Stewart	Jamaica	10 July 2009	2009	
200 m	21.91 (+1.3 m/s)	Shericka Jackson	Jamaica	9 June 2022	2022	
400 m	49.17	Marita Koch	East Germany	10 September 1986	1986	
800 m	1:55.69	Pamela Jelimo	Kenya	11 July 2008	2008	
1500 m	3:49.11	Faith Kipyegon	Kenya	2 June 2023	2023	
Mile	4:21.38	Paula Ivan	Romania	19 July 1989	1989	
3000 m	8:23.96	Olga Yegorova	Russia	29 June 2001	2001	
5000 m	14:03.69	Beatrice Chebet	Kenya	6 June 2025	2025	
100 m hurdles	12.24 (−0.4 m/s)	Ackera Nugent	Jamaica	30 August 2024	2024	
400 m hurdles	52.43	Femke Bol	Netherlands	2 June 2023	2023	
3000 m steeplechase	8:44.39	Winfred Yavi	Bahrain	30 August 2024	2024	
High jump	2.03 m	Yelena Slesarenko	Russia	2 July 2004	2004	
High jump	2.03 m	Hestrie Cloete	South Africa	2 July 2004	2004	
High jump	2.03 m	Blanka Vlašić	Croatia	10 June 2010	2010	
High jump	2.03 m	Chaunté Howard-Lowe	United States	10 June 2010	2010	
Pole vault	5.03 m	Yelena Isinbayeva	Russia	13 July 2007	2007	
Long jump	7.23 m (−0.3 m/s)	Marion Jones	United States	14 July 1998	1998	
Triple jump	15.29 m (+0.3 m/s)	Yamilé Aldama	Cuba	11 July 2003	2003	
Shot put	21.03 m	Valerie Adams	New Zealand	31 May 2012	2012	
Discus throw	69.21 m	Valarie Allman	United States	6 June 2025	2025	
Javelin throw	68.66 m	Barbora Špotáková	Czech Republic	10 June 2010	2010	
4 × 100 m relay	43.64	Nataliya Strohova; Yelizaveta Bryzgina; Olesya Povh; Natalia Pohrebniak	Ukraine	2 June 2016	2016	

== See also ==
- Notturna di Milano
- Rieti Meeting
- Memorial Primo Nebiolo
