= Telahun Haile Bekele =

Ethiopian long-distance runner

Personal information
- Born: 13 May 1999 (age 27) Gurage Zone, Ethiopia

Sport
- Sport: Athletics
- Event: 5000 metres
- Coached by: Nigatu Worku

Achievements and titles
- Personal bests: 3000 m: 7:25.48 (2023); 5000 m: 12:42.70 (2023); 10,000 m: 26:52.79 (2025); 5km (road): 13:03 (2022); 10km (road): 27:13 (2025)

Telahun Haile Bekele (Amharic: ጥላሁን ኃይሌ በቀለ; born 13 May 1999) is an Ethiopian male long-distance runner who specialises in the 5000 metres. His career has included victories at the Golden Gala Pietro Mennea, and at the Bislett Games. He was fourth in the 5000m at the 2019 World Championships.

== Biography ==
Born to rural farmers in Gurage Zone, Telahun became interested in running after taking part in a high school competition. He joined up with coach Assefa Gadisa in 2015, who guided him to runner-up in the 5000m at the 2017 Ethiopian Athletics Championships. This caught the attention of national coach Hussein Shibo, who brought the youngster into a training group alongside professionals Selemon Barega and Hagos Gebrhiwet. Telahun began competing internationally in 2017, taking part in European 10K run road races and placing second at the Giro al Sas and third at the Grand 10 Berlin.

He began 2018 in Europe with third at the Czech Indoor Gala and a runner-up finish at the Cinque Mulini. A 5000m win at the Ethiopian U20 Championships and a personal best of 13:04.63 minutes to win at the Meeting Iberoamericano de Atletismo saw him enter the 2018 IAAF World U20 Championships saw him enter the competition as the second fastest runner after training mate Selemon Barega. He was beaten by the heat, however, and finished fifth in the 5000m. Telahun made his IAAF Diamond League debut that year, placing seventh at Athletissima. He closed the year with third place at the Great Ethiopian Run. At the start of 2019 he continued to show his strength over distance with second place at the Giro Media Blenio 10K. Turning to the track, he won the Ethiopian national title, was fifth at the Shanghai Golden Grand Prix, then had his first Diamond League victory by winning the 5000m at the Golden Gala, beating his partner Selemon Barega. He was third at that year's Athletissima and placed fourth at the Diamond League final at the Weltklasse Zürich.

At the beginning of 2020, Telahun ran two indoor races over 3000m, including a race in Liévin, where he set a new personal best of 7:38.85. In the Summer, injury ruled Telahun out of any competitions. In 2021, he began his season at the Ethiopian Olympic Trials over 5000m. He did not finish the race, and therefore could not qualify. Two days later, on June 10, Telahun ran the Golden Gala, finishing in 13:18.29 for tenth place. He later finished seventh in the 3000m at the Gyulai Istvan Memorial in July. In March 2022, after an eight-month break from competition, Telahun returned to win the 5 km de Lille in 13:10. This time placed him 9th in the All-time lists over the distance. In April, he came 2nd in the 5000m at the Ethiopian Athletics Championships. In June, he came sixth at the Golden Gala in 12:57.18 - his fastest 5000m since June 2019. A week later, Telahun won the 5000m at the Bislett Games in Oslo, ahead of compatriots Samuel Tefera and Getnet Wale. However, at the World Championships, five days later, he was only seventh in his heat, missing out on the final by one place. Telahun finished his track season by coming fourth at the 5000m Diamond League Final, held as part of the Weltklasse Zürich. In December, he won the Corrida de Houilles in 27:29.

== Statistics ==
=== International competitions ===
Year	Competition	Venue	Position	Event	Notes
2018	World U20 Championships	Tampere, Finland	5th	5000 m	13:23.24
2019	World Championships	Doha, Qatar	4th	5000 m	13:02.29
2022	World Championships	Eugene, United States	16th (h)	5000 m	13:24.77

=== Circuit wins ===
5000 m

- IAAF Diamond League
  - Golden Gala: 2019
  - Bislett Games: 2022

=== National titles ===
- Ethiopian Athletics Championships
  - 5000 m: 2019
- Ethiopian U20 Championships
  - 5000 m: 2018
