= Nicholas Kimeli =

Kenyan long-distance runner

Nicholas Kipkorir Kimeli
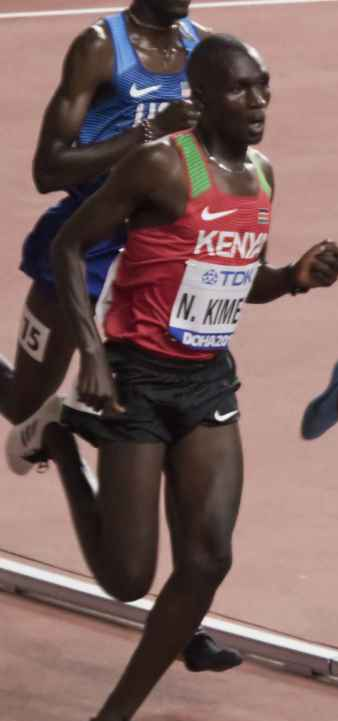

Personal information
- Nationality: Kenyan
- Born: 29 September 1998 (age 28) Eldoret, Uasin Gishu County, Kenya

Sport
- Country: Kenya
- Sport: Track and field
- Events: 3000 meters, 5000 meters, 10000 meters
Medal record
Men's athletics
Representing Kenya
Diamond League
First place	2022	5000 m
World Cross Country Championships
Gold medal – first place	2023 Bathurst	Senior team
World Road Running Championships
Bronze medal – third place	2023 Riga	5K
Silver medal – second place	2026 Copenhagen	Half marathon
Gold medal – first place	2026 Copenhagen	Half marathon team

Nicholas Kipkorir Kimeli (born 29 September 1998) is a Kenyan long-distance runner.

In Hengelo, on 9 June 2019, he ran a 5000 metres personal best in under 13 minutes. At the 2019 London Grand Prix, at the same distance, he finished in third place. He qualified for the final at the 2019 World Athletics Championships in Doha, after being third at the Kenyan Trials.

Kimeli qualified to represent Kenya at the 2020 Summer Olympics, where he finished in fourth place.

During the 2022 Brașov Running Festival, Kimeli won the 10K race with a time of 26:51, breaking the Romanian 10K all-comers record by nearly two minutes, and establishing himself as the fifth-fastest 10K runner ever.

== Personal bests ==
Outdoor

- 3000 metres – 7:31.19 (Monaco 2022)
- 5000 metres – 12:46.33 (Rome 2022)
- 10,000 metres – 26:50.94 (Eugene 2024)

Road

- 5K – 12:55 (Herzogenaurach 2022) NR
- 10K – 26:51 (Brasov 2022)
- Half marathon – 58:23 (Copenhagen 2025)
- Marathon – 2:03:39 (Amsterdam 2026)
