= 2017 Swiss Indoor Athletics Championships =

- Dates: 18–19 February
- Host city: Magglingen
- Venue: Sporthalle End der Welt
- Events: 24

The 2017 Swiss Indoor Athletics Championships (German: Schweizer Leichtathletik-Hallenmeisterschaften 2017, French: Championnats suisses d´athlétisme en salle 2017) was the 36th edition of the national championship in indoor track and field for Switzerland. It was held on 18–19 February at the Sporthalle End der Welt in Magglingen, Evilard. A total of 24 events (divided evenly between the sexes) were contested over the two-day competition.

== Results ==
=== Men ===
Event	Gold		Silver		Bronze	
60 metres	Pascal Mancini	6.67	Jean-Yann de Grace (MRI)	6.77	Sylvain Chuard	6.78 PB
200 metres	Jonas Werner	21.66 PB	Daniele Angelella	21.83	Yannick Moevi	22.03 PB
400 metres	Luca Flück	47.21	Ricky Petrucciani	47.95	Daniele Angelella	48.33
800 metres	Hugo Santacruz	1:48.46 PB	Roland Christen	1:50.48	Arnaud Dupré	1:52.61 PB
1500 metres	Jan Hochstrasser	3:54.08	Marc Bill	3:56.31	Jann Tscharner	3:57.10 PB
3000 metres	Luca Noti	8:15.74	Andreas Kempf	8:25.64 PB	Ilias Hernandez	8:27.01 PB
60 m hurdles	Jason Joseph	7.94 PB	Tobias Furer	7.94	Sales Junior Inglin	8.11 PB
High jump	Roman Sieber	2.12 m	Vivien Streit	2.09 m	Quentin Pirlet	2.06 m
Pole vault	Dominik Alberto	5.53 m PB	Andri Oberholzer	4.93 m PB	Reto Fahrni Patrick Schütz	4.83 m
Long jump	Christopher Ullmann	7.88 m PB	Benjamin Gföhler	7.81 m PB	Jarod Biya	7.20 m
Triple jump	Simon Sieber	15.42 m PB	Nils Wicki	15.42 m PB	Roman Sieber	14.37 m
Shot put	Gregori Ott	17.49 m	Lars Meyer	14.48 m	Thomas Bigler	14.46 m

=== Women ===
Event	Gold		Silver		Bronze	
60 metres	Mujinga Kambundji	7.18	Sarah Atcho	7.34 PB	Ajla Del Ponte	7.39
200 metres	Léa Sprunger	22.98 PB	Sarah Atcho	23.51	Ajla Del Ponte	23.87
400 metres	Yasmin Giger	53.93 PB	Selina Büchel	54.28 PB	Vanessa Zimmermann	54.48 PB
800 metres	Delia Sclabas	2:06.64	Lisa Kurmann	2:08.28 PB	Stefanie Barmet	2:08.72 PB
3000 metres	Sibylle Häring	9:47.58	Chiara Scherrer	9:49.85	Nicole Egger	9:51.66
60 m hurdles	Ellen Sprunger	8.35 PB	Annik Kälin	8.47	Caroline Agnou	8.54
High jump	Livia Odermatt	1.80 m	Janin von Arx	1.77 m PB	Deborah Vomsattel	1.74 m
Pole vault	Angelica Moser	4.37 m	Pascale Stöcklin	4.10 m	Melanie Fasel	4.10 m PB
Long jump	Caroline Agnou	6.12 m PB	Annik Kälin	6.07 m	Barbara Leuthard	6.01 m
Triple jump	Barbara Leuthard	12.85 m	Serena Raffi	12.43 m PB	Alina Tobler	12.17 m
Shot put	Ásdís Hjálmsdóttir (ISL)	15.96 m	Caroline Agnou	13.86 m	Jasmin Lukas	13.61 m
