= Daniela Gubler =

Swiss long jumper (born 1994)

Personal information
- Nationality: Switzerland
- Born: Daniela Schlatter; 22 March 1994 (32 years, 133 days old)
- Home town: Wohlen bei Bern, Switzerland

Sport
- Sport: Athletics
- Events: Long jump 100 metres
- Club: LAC Wohlen (until 2015); TV Länggasse Bern
- Coached by: Adrian Gubler

Achievements and titles
- National finals: 2017 Swiss Champs; • Long jump, 6th; 2018 Swiss Indoors; • Long jump, 11th; • Triple jump, 8th; 2018 Swiss Champs; • Long jump, 12th; 2019 Swiss Indoors; • Long jump, 10th; 2019 Swiss Champs; • Long jump, 16th; 2020 Swiss Champs; • Long jump, 4th; 2021 Swiss Champs; • Long jump, 1st (gold); 2022 Swiss Indoors; • Long jump, 1st (gold); 2023 Swiss Indoors; • Long jump, 2nd (silver); 2023 Swiss Champs; • Long jump, 2nd (silver)
- Personal bests: LJ: 6.64m (+0.9) (2023); 100m: 11.91 (+1.3) (2023)
- Updated on 29 December 2023

Daniela Gubler (née Schlatter; born 22 March 1994) is a Swiss long jumper. She is the 2021 outdoor and 2022 indoor national champion in the long jump.

== Biography ==
Gubler is from Wohlen bei Bern, Switzerland, and until 2015 she was a member of the LAC Wohlen athletics club. From 2015 to 2019, she competed in several disciplines, with a mixture of results in the long jump, triple jump, 100 metres, and 200 metres.

After switching to the TV Länggasse club under coach Adrian Gubler, in 2019 she began to focus solely on the triple jump (excepting one heptathlon competition in 2021). In 2021, Gubler achieved the top Swiss mark in the long jump despite spending most of her time working as a market manager at Swiss Federal Railways and being a part-time student.

At the 2021 Swiss Athletics Championships on 27 June, Gubler leapt 6.37 metres on her sixth and final attempt to take the lead over Gaëlle Maonzambi, achieving her first national championship title. Later that season on 15 August, Gubler was the top female competitor at the Championnats Romands Open in Lausanne with a 14.69 metres leap, competing against both male and female competitors.

In 2022, Gubler won the Swiss Indoor Athletics Championships, her first indoor national title. During the outdoor season on 26 July, Gubler won the Motonet Grand Prix meeting in Jyväskylä, Finland with a mark of 6.27 metres.

At the 2023 European Athletics Team Championships First Division, Gubler represented Switzerland in the long jump, placing 13th but not advancing to the finals.

== Statistics ==
=== Personal bests ===
Event	Mark	Place	Competition	Venue	Date	Ref
Long jump	6.64 m (+0.9 m/s)	1st place, gold medalist(s)	Pfingstmeeting	Zofingen, Switzerland	27 May 2023	
100 metres	11.91 (+1.3 m/s)	(gold) (heat #6)	Meeting de la Gruyère	Bulle, Switzerland	8 July 2023	
