= 2017 Swiss Athletics Championships =

- Dates: 21–22 July
- Host city: Zürich, Switzerland
- Venue: Letzigrund
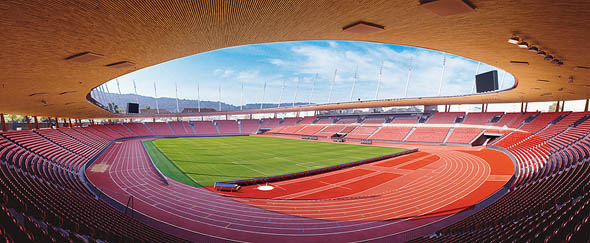

The 2017 Swiss Athletics Championships (German: Schweizer Leichtathletik-Meisterschaften 2017) was the year's national outdoor track and field championships for Switzerland. It was held on 21 and 22 July at the Letzigrund in Zürich.

It served as the selection meeting for Switzerland at the 2017 World Championships in Athletics.

== Results ==
=== Men ===
Event	Gold		Silver		Bronze	
100 metres	Alex Wilson	10.25	Pascal Mancini	10.42	Silvan Wicki	10.47
200 metres	Silvan Wicki	20.70 PB	Pascal Mancini	21.00	Dany Brand	21.10 PB
400 metres	Joel Burgunder	46.00 PB	Silvan Lutz	46.97	Daniele Angelella	46.98
800 metres	Jonas Schöpfer	1:53.79	Pascal Furtwängler	1:53.99	Joaquim Jaeger	1:54.23
1500 metres	Julien Wanders	3:44.74 PB	Thomas Gmür	3:44.83 PB	Jan Hochstrasser	3:45.69
5000 metres	Jonas Raess	14:22.88	Luca Noti	14:26.25	Andreas Kempf	14:26.76
110 m hurdles	Tobias Furer	14.13	Brahian Peña	14.18	Ramon Flammer	14.66
400 m hurdles	Alain-Hervé Mfomkpa	51.01	Mattia Tajana	51.62 PB	Andreas Ritz	51.80
High jump	Loïc Gasch	2.26 m	Roman Sieber	2.03 m	Vivien Streit	2.00 m
Pole vault	Mitch Greeley	5.00 m	Reto Fahrni	5.00 m	Adrian Kübler	5.00 m
Long jump	Christopher Ullmann	7.26 m	Marco Thürkauf	7.28 m PB	Luca Di Tizio	7.03 m
Triple jump	Nils Wicki	15.63 m	Roman Sieber	15.14 m	Simon Sieber	15.07 m
Shot put	Gregori Ott	17.22 m	Sandro Ferrari	15.60 m	Lukas Blass	15.40 m PB
Discus throw	Lukas Jost	50.88 m	Sandro Ferrari	49.00 m PB	Grob Stefan	48.12 m
Hammer throw	Martin Bingisser	62.74 m	Yann Moulinier	53.62 m	Björn Kötteritzsch	49.16 m
Javelin throw	Laurent Carron	66.58 m	Colin Wirz	65.93 m PB	Lukas von Stokar	65.03 m

=== Women ===
Event	Gold		Silver		Bronze	
100 metres	Mujinga Kambundji	11.08	Salomé Kora	11.32	Sarah Atcho	11.48
200 metres	Mujinga Kambundji	22.42 PB	Léa Sprunger	22.56	Cornelia Halbheer	23.16 PB
400 metres	Agnė Šerkšnienė	52.65	Vanessa Zimmermann	52.89 PB	Selina Büchel	52.97 PB
800 metres	Lore Hoffmann	2:13.64	Fabienne Schlumpf	2:13.96	Alexandra Bosshard Sina Sprecher	2:13.96
1500 metres	Stefanie Barmet	4:26.13	Chiara Scherrer	4:27.50 PB	Selina Ummel	4:28.83
5000 metres	Martina Tresch	16:28.58 PB	Krisztina Papp (HUN)	16:29.41	Aude Salord	16:40.60
100 m hurdles	Caroline Agnou	13.60 PB	Selina von Jackowski	13.73	Julia Schneider	13.97 PB
400 m hurdles	Robine Schürmann	58.02	Avril Jackson	59.36 PB	Daniela Kyburz	60.41
High jump	Salome Lang	1.80 m	Livia Odermatt	1.77 m	Dominique Good	1.74 m
Pole vault	Angelica Moser	4.61 m PB	Olivia Fischer	4.00 m	Angela Metzger	4.00 m
Long jump	Fatim Affessi	6.19 m	Selina von Jackowski	6.14 m	Caroline Agnou	6.13 m
Triple jump	Fatim Affessi	12.53 m	Gaëlle Maonzambi	12.44 m	Barbara Leuthard	12.43 m
Shot put	Lea Herrsche	14.16 m	Jasmin Lukas	14.13 m	Caroline Agnou	13.68 m
Discus throw	Pauline Pousse (FRA)	56.10 m	Pauline Vaglio-Agnes	45.27 m	Chantal Tanner	44.17 m
Hammer throw	Nicole Zihlmann	60.67 m	Lydia Wehrli	56.12 m	Vanessa Kuku	49.61 m PB
Javelin throw	Nadja-Marie Pasternack	50.21 m	Nathalie Meier	50.02 m	Estefania Garcia	48.00 m
