= Audrey Werro =

Swiss middle-distance runner (born 2004)

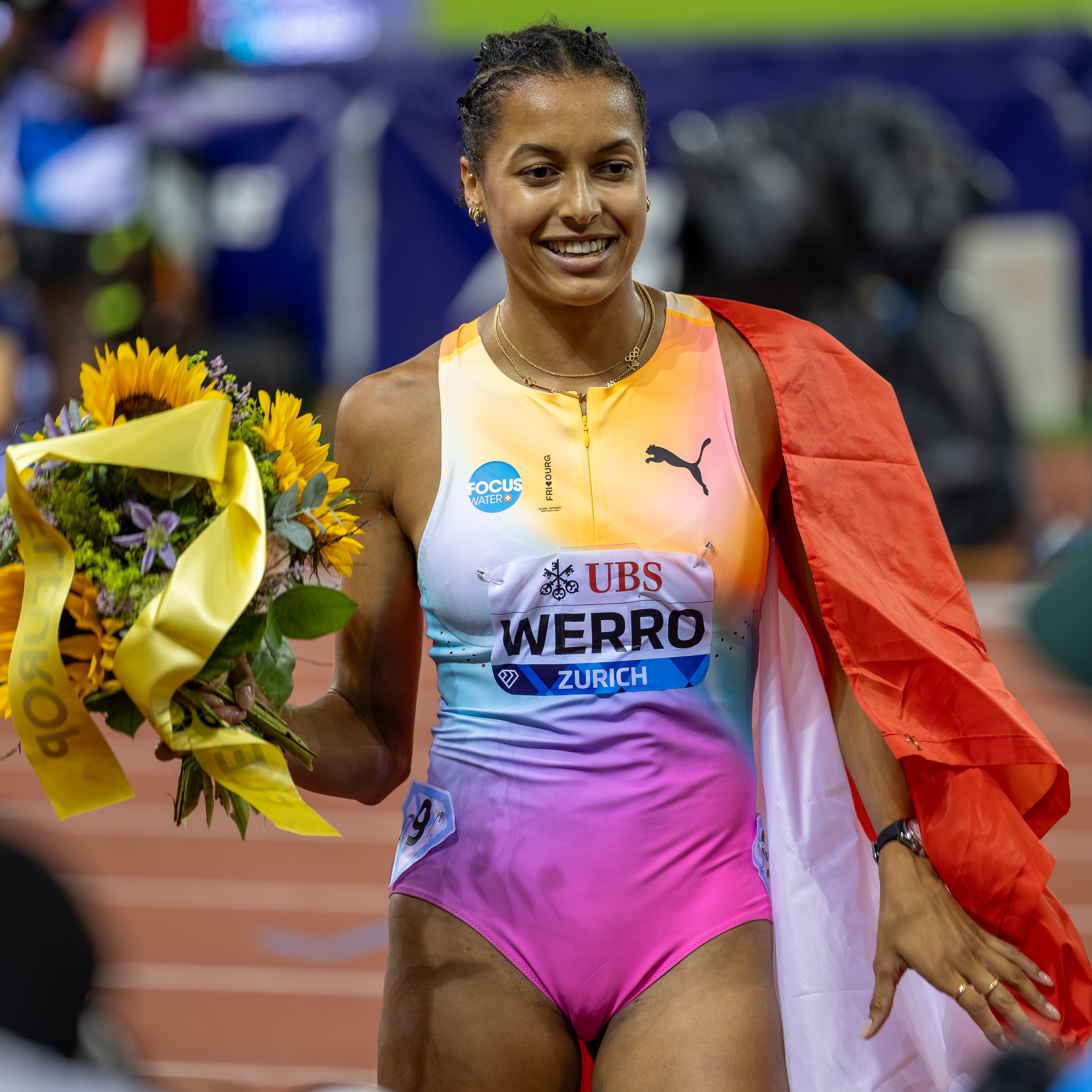
- Werro at the 2026 Weltklasse Zürich

Personal information
- Born: 27 March 2004 (age 22)
- Home town: Fribourg, Switzerland
- Education: Collège de Gambach
- Height: 1.82 m (6 ft 0 in)

Sport
- Country: Switzerland
- Sport: Athletics
- Events: 400 metres, 800 metres
- Club: CA Belfaux
- Coached by: Christiane Berset Nuoffer

Achievements and titles
- Personal bests: 400 m: 50.80 (2026); 400 m sh: 53.03 i (2022, NU20R); 800 m: 1:53.70 (2026, NR); 800 m sh: 1:56.64 i (2026, NR)
Medal record
Women's athletics
Representing Switzerland
World Ultimate Championship
First place	2026 Budapest	800 m
World Indoor Championships
Silver medal – second place	2026 Toruń	800 m
Diamond League
First place	2025 Zurich	800 m
First place	2026 Brussels	800 m
European Championships
Gold medal – first place	2026 Birmingham	800 m
European U23 Championships
Gold medal – first place	2025 Bergen	800 m
World U20 Championships
Silver medal – second place	2022 Cali	800 m
European U20 Championships
Gold medal – first place	2021 Tallinn	800 m
Gold medal – first place	2023 Jerusalem	800 m

Audrey Werro (born 27 March 2004) is a Swiss track and field athlete. She is the reigning European champion for the 800 metres, having won the gold medal at the 2026 European Championships in Birmingham. That year, Werro won the World Ultimate Championship during an unbeaten outdoor season and ran the third fastest 800 m time in history with 1:53.70 in Zurich, and also ran the fifth fastest time for the distance on a short track when winning the silver medal in the 800 m at the 2026 World Indoor Championships in Toruń.

At junior levels, she won the gold medal at the 2025 European U23 Championships, the silver medal at the 2022 World Under-20 Championships, and gold medals at the 2021 and 2023 European U20 Championships.

She is a nine-time gold medalist over 800 m at the Swiss Championships (four outdoor and five indoor). She holds national records at senior level as well as the U18 and U20 levels.

== Early life ==
Audrey Werro was born on 27 March 2004 to a Swiss father, Claude, and an Ivorian mother, Philomène. She has a sister and two brothers. She is from Fribourg, in west Switzerland, and studied at nearby Gambach College.

Werro began athletics at the age of nine. She joined Club Athlétique Belfaux, and was coached by Christiane Berset Nuoffer, who continued as her coach into her professional career.

== Career ==
=== 2021 ===
In June 2021, at age 17, Werro was runner-up in the 800 metres at the Swiss Championships, running 2:02.88 to finish behind champion Lore Hoffmann. She set new national U18 records over the 400 and 800 metres that year. In July, she won the gold medal in the 800 m at the European Under-20 Championships held in Tallinn, Estonia, competing against athletes up to two years her senior.

=== 2022 ===
In February 2022, Werro broke the Swiss U23 indoor 400 m record by 0.84 s with a time of 53.03 seconds in Magglingen. She next became the national indoor champion over the 800 m, running 2:04.95 also in Magglingen. In June, she broke the Swiss U20 and U23 records in the outdoor event, previously held by Delia Sclabas (2:01.29), with a time of 2:00:28 in Geneva. The same month, Werro also won the Swiss 800 m outdoor title, clocking 2:02.72 in Zürich.

In August, she won the silver medal in the event at the World U20 Championships held in Cali, Colombia with an U23 national record of 1:59.53, behind Roisin Willis for whom it was also the first time she ran sub-two minutes in an 800 m race. The same month, Werro made her debut in the senior championships at the European Championships in Munich, where she was eliminated in the heats in 2:06.34. In December, she was nominated for Radio SRF Best Talent Sport award.

=== 2023 ===
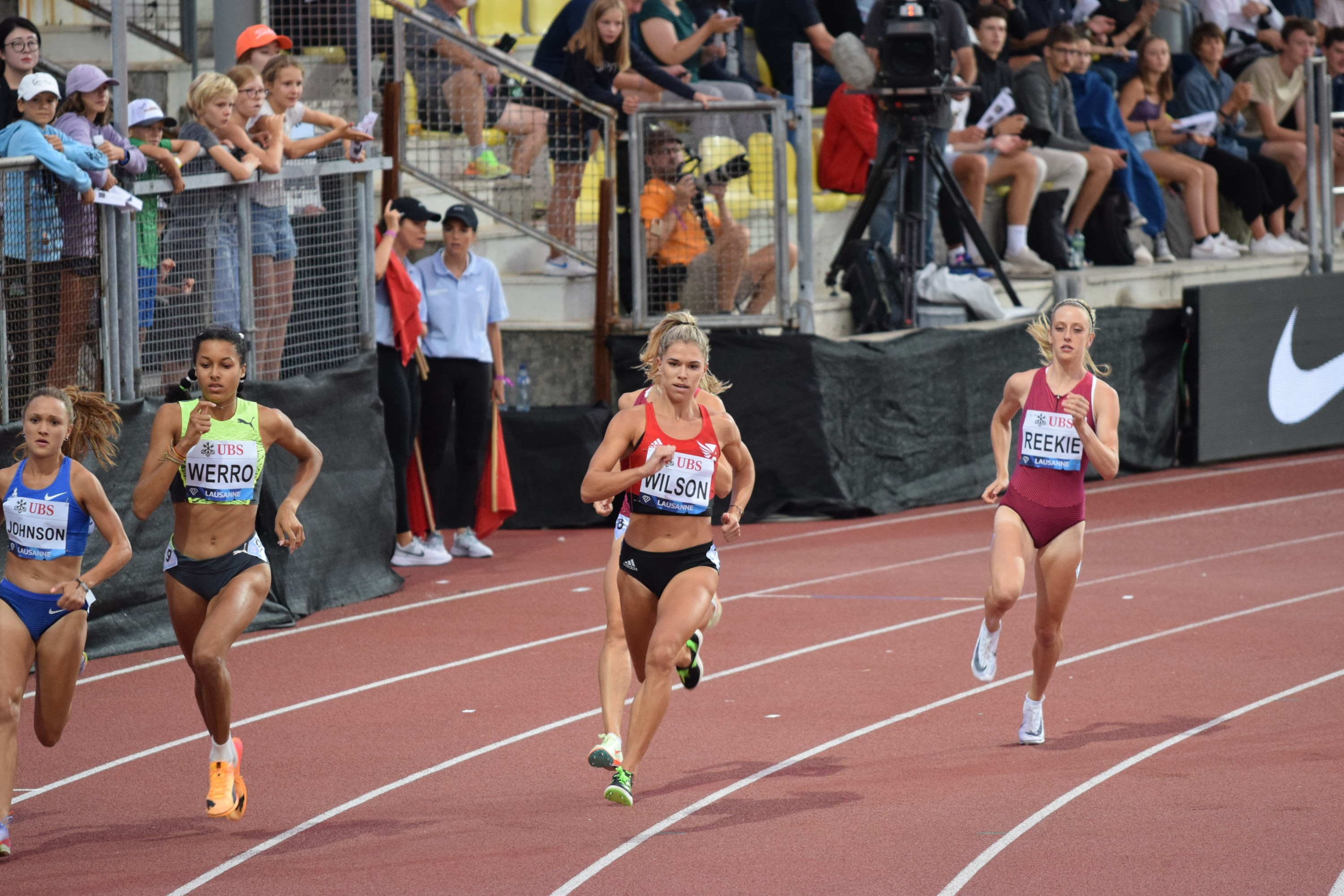
Werro (second runner from the left) at 2022 Athletissima

In early February, aged 18 years, Werro ran a Swiss U23 indoor 800 m record of 2:00.57 in Val-de-Reuil, just 0.19 s off Selina Rutz-Büchel's national senior record. This came six days after Werro had lowered Rutz-Büchel's Swiss indoor 600 m record to 1:26.14. In March, at the European Indoor Championships, held in Istanbul, she finished fifth in the 800 m final in a time of 2:00.91, 0.06 s away from bronze.

In July, Werro won her second national title in the outdoor 800 m with a time of 2:01.70 at the Swiss Championships in Bellinzona. She was also the indoor champion over the 800 m for the second year in a row. The following month, she attended the European U20 Championships, held in Jerusalem, and won the gold medal in the 800 m for the second time since 2021.

In August, Werro set a new 800 metres personal best at the Diamond League meeting in Zürich, running 1:59.50. She competed at the 2023 World Athletics Championships in Budapest in August 2023 finishing 6th in her heat. Shortly after the World Athletics Championships, Werro broke her own national U20 record by running 1:58.13 at the Galà dei Castelli in Bellinzona.

=== 2024 ===
She competed in the 800 metres at the World Indoor Championships. She won her qualifying heat in a time of 2:01.83. In the semi-final she ran a new indoor personal best time of 2:00.16.

She competed in the 800 metres at the Summer Olympics in Paris in August, being eliminated in the repechage round. She set a new Swiss national record time of 1:57.76 for the 800 metres in Bellinzona in September.

=== 2025 ===
She was the fastest qualifier for the 800 metres final at the European Indoor Championships in Apeldoorn, Netherlands. However, in the final she clashed with eventual medalist Anita Horvat and fell to the floor with the race carrying on ahead of her. She reached the final of the 800 metres at the World Indoor Championships in Nanjing. In the final, she ran a personal best and Swiss national indoor record of 1:59.81 to finish in fourth place, 0.01 seconds behind bronze medal winner Patricia Silva of Portugal.

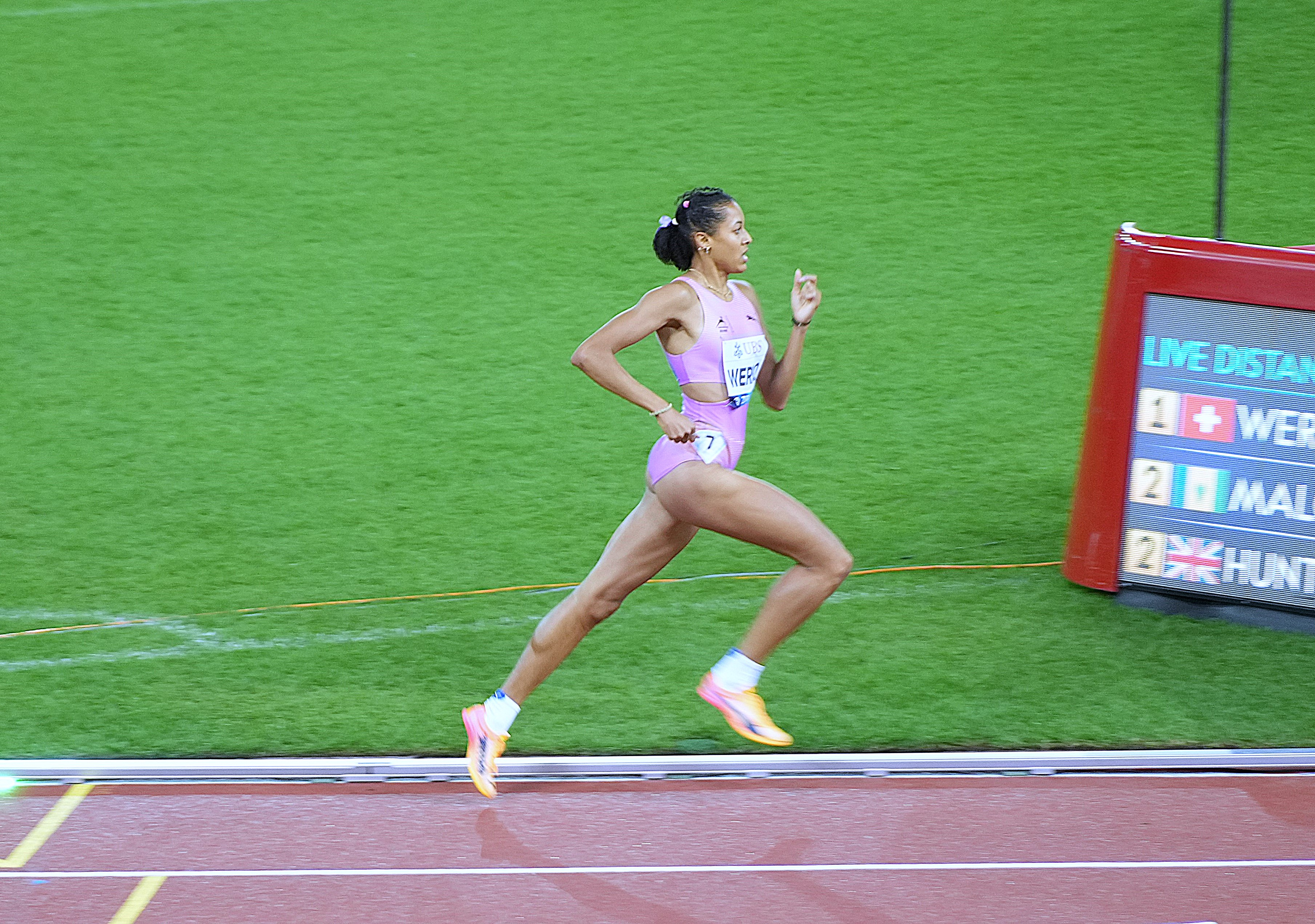
Werro competing at the Zurich Diamond League Final in 2025

In May, she ran a new 800 metres national record of 1:57.25 at the World Athletics Continental Tour Gold meeting in Bydgoszcz. She placed fourth in the 800 metres in June in Stockholm at the BAUHAUS-galan event, part of the Diamond League. She ran a 2:34.88 personal best over 1000 metres in Monaco at the Herculis. She ran a championship record of 1:57.42 to win the gold medal in the 800 metres at the European U23 Championships in Bergen, Norway. The following month, she finished runner-up to Keely Hodgkinson over 800 m in 1:57.34 at the Athletissima event in Lausanne and lowered her personal best to 1:56.29 in winning the Swiss Championships. She ran an 800 m personal best 1:55.91 to win the Diamond League Final in Zurich ahead of Georgia Hunter Bell on 28 August.

In September, she was a finalist in the women's 800 metres at the World Championships in Tokyo, Japan, placing sixth in a time of 1:56.17.

In October, she was crowned European Rising Star of the Year.

=== 2026 ===
Werro opened her 2026 indoor season at the Meeting de l’Eure in Val-de-Reuil, a World Athletics Indoor Tour Silver meeting on 1 February, winning over 800 m in 1:57.49, taking more than two seconds off her own national indoor record. A few days later, she moved to eighth on the world all-time list with 1:57.27 in Belgrade. On 19 February, she was runner up in Liévin, as Keely Hodgkinson set a new indoor 800 m world record. Werro won the Swiss Indoor Championships over 800 metres on 1 March 2026, running 1:57.98 in the final. Competing in the 800 metres at the World Indoor Championships in Toruń, Poland, in March, Werro won her semi-final in 1:59.27, before winning the silver medal behind Hodgkinson in the final in 1:56.64, moving to fifth on the world all-time indoor list.

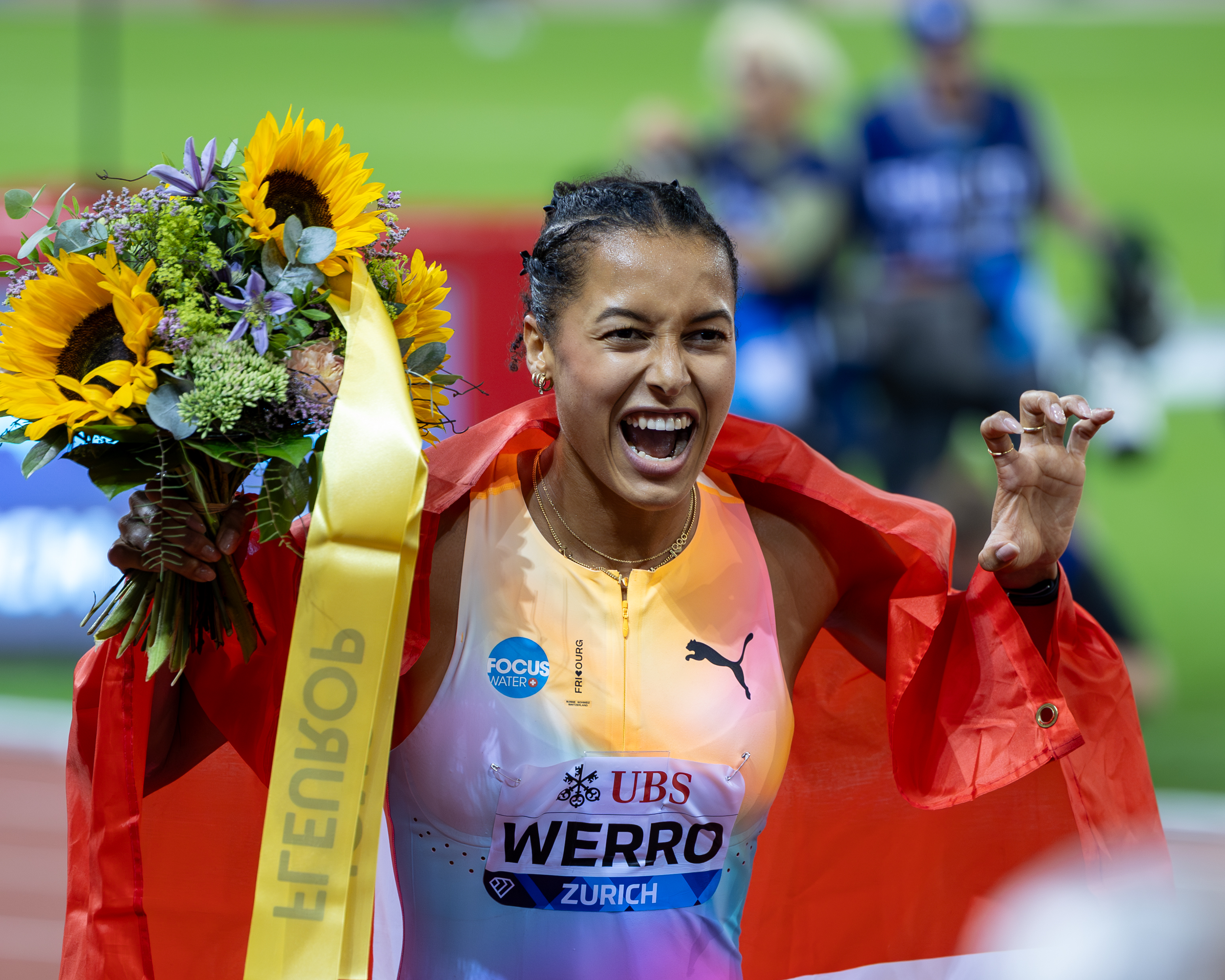
Werro winning the 800 m at the 2026 Weltklasse Zürich.

On 31 May, she ran a meeting record of 1:56.56 to win the 800 metres at the Diamond League in Rabat. On 7 June, at the Stockholm Diamond League, Werro defeated Keely Hodgkinson in the 800 metres in a new Swiss record of 1:53.98. This was the third fastest time in history, and the fastest for 43 years. On 16 June, Werro won ahead of Femke Broeders-Bol in 1:54.45 at the Golden Spike meeting in Ostrava. On 28 June, at the Paris Diamond League, Werro improved her national record in the 800 metres to 1:53.80.

Competing at the European Championships in Birmingham, England, on 13 August, Werro fell while leading in the final 120 metres of her semi-final. Having returned to her feet and slowing finishing the race, she was reinstated on appeal into the final having been adjudged to have fallen following inadvertent contact on her foot by the hand of French woman Anaïs Bourgoin running behind her. She then won the final the following day in a championship record of 1:54.81, finishing ahead of Hodgkinson and Broeders-Bol who had qualified from the other semi-final, with Werro controlling the pace for much of the final before pulling away in the final 100 metres. On 21 August, she set a new meeting record at the Athletissima in Lausanne, winning in 1:55.33 to finish ahead of Broeders-Bol and Saida Tsehaye. On 27 August, she ran a new Diamond League record and personal best of 1:53.70 to win the 2026 Weltklasse Zürich. At the 2026 Diamond League Final in Brussels on 5 September, Werro broke Pamela Jelimo's 18-year-old meeting record to claim the 800 metres title in a narrow win over Broeders-Bol, winning by 0.06 seconds in 1:54.75. On 12 September, she won the 800 metres in the inaugural World Athletics Ultimate Championships in Budapest in 1:55.88 to complete an unbeaten outdoor season.

For her efforts in 2026, Werro was crowned European Athlete of the Year and nominated for World Athlete of the Year.

== Achievements ==
Information from her World Athletics profile unless otherwise noted.

=== Personal bests ===
Type	Distance	Time (s)	Venue	Date	Notes
Indoor	400 metres sh	53.03	Magglingen, Switzerland	12 February 2022	NU20R
Indoor	600 metres sh	1:26.14	Magglingen, Switzerland	29 January 2023	NU20B
Indoor	800 metres sh	1:56.64	Toruń, Poland	22 March 2026	NR
Outdoor	400 metres	50.80	Zurich, Switzerland	25 July 2026	
Outdoor	600 metres	1:22.85	Biel, Switzerland	23 June 2026	AB NBP
Outdoor	800 metres	1:53.70	Zurich, Switzerland	27 August 2026	NR
Outdoor	1000 metres	2:34.88	Fontvieille, Monaco	11 July 2025	

=== International competitions ===
Representing Switzerland
Year	Competition	Venue	Position	Event	Time	Notes
2021	European U20 Championships	Tallinn, Estonia	1st	800 m	2:03.12	PB
2022	World U20 Championships	Cali, Colombia	2nd	800 m	1:59.53	NU20R
2022	European Championships	Munich, Germany	28th (h)	800 m	2:06.34	
2023	European Indoor Championships	Istanbul, Turkey	5th	800 m i	2:00.91	
2023	European Team Championships First Division	Chorzów, Poland	1st	800 m	1:59:95	
2023	European U20 Championships	Jerusalem, Israel	1st	800 m	2:03.38	
2023	World Championships	Budapest, Hungary	34th (h)	800 m	2:01.03	
2024	World Indoor Championships	Glasgow, United Kingdom	10th (sf)	800 m	2:00.16	
2024	Olympic Games	Paris, France	11th (rep)	800 m	2:00.62	
2025	European Indoor Championships	Apeldoorn, Netherlands	6th	800 m	2:27.37	
2025	World Indoor Championships	Nanjing, China	4th	800 m	1:59.81	
2025	European U23 Championships	Bergen, Norway	1st	800 m	1:57.42	
2025	European U23 Championships	Bergen, Norway	7th	4 × 400 m relay	3:31.38	
2025	World Championships	Tokyo, Japan	6th	800 m	1:56.17	
2026	World Indoor Championships	Toruń, Poland	2nd	800 m	1:56.64	
2026	European Championships	Birmingham, United Kingdom	1st	800 m	1:54.81	CR
2026	World Ultimate Championship	Budapest, Hungary	1st	800 m	1:55.88	

=== National championships ===
Year	Competition	Venue	Position	Event	Time	Notes
2018	Swiss U16 Championships	Frauenfeld	1st	600 m	1:35.07	
2019	Swiss U16 Championships	Düdingen	1st	600 m	1:31.59	
2020	Swiss U18 Championships	Lausanne	1st	800 m	2:09.06	
2021	Swiss Indoor Championships	Magglingen	5th	800 m	2:07.95	
2021	Swiss Championships	Langenthal	2nd	800 m	2:02.88	
2021	Swiss U18 Championships	Winterthur	3rd	200 m	24.42	
2022	Swiss Indoor Championships	Magglingen	1st	800 m	2:04.95	
2022	Swiss Championships	Zürich	1st	800 m	2:02.88	
2022	Swiss U20 Championships	Geneva	6th	200 m	24.20	
2023	Swiss Indoor Championships	St. Gallen	1st	800 m	2:02.87	
2023	Swiss Championships	Bellinzona	1st	800 m	2:01.70	
2023	Swiss U20 Championships	Lausanne	1st	400 m	52.69	
2024	Swiss Indoor Championships	St. Gallen	1st	800 m	2:01.76	
2024	Swiss Championships	Winterthur	2nd	800 m	1:58.67	
2024	Swiss U23 Championships	Langenthal	1st	400 m	52.73	
2025	Swiss Indoor Championships	St. Gallen	1st	800 m	2:01.13	
2025	Swiss Championships	Frauenfeld	1st	800 m	1:56.29	NR
2026	Swiss Indoor Championships	St. Gallen	1st	800 m	1:57.98	
2026	Swiss Championships	Zürich	1st (heats)^{1}	400 m	50.80	PB
2026	Swiss Championships	Zürich	1st	800 m	1:57.21	

^{1}Did not start in the final.
