= Valentin Imsand =

Swiss pole vaulter (born 2005)

Personal information
- Nationality: Swiss
- Born: 6 January 2005 (age 21)

Sport
- Sport: Athletics
- Event: Pole vault

Achievements and titles
- Personal bests: Pole vault: 5.82 m NR (Sion, 2025)
Medal record
Men's athletics
Representing Switzerland
European U20 Championships
Silver medal – second place	2023 Jerusalem	Pole vault
European U18 Championships
Silver medal – second place	2022 Jerusalem	Pole vault

Valentin Imsand (born 6 January 2005) is a Swiss pole vaulter. He is a multiple-time national indoor champion and Swiss national record holder.

== Career ==
From Valais, he is a member of CS 13 Etoiles and worked under the guidance of his longtime coach Boris Zengaffinen. In September 2020, he cleared 4.60 metres to set a new Swiss U16 record whilst competing in Lausanne.

He won his first senior Swiss indoor national title in February 2022 in Magglingen. He was a silver medalist at the 2022 European Athletics U18 Championships in Jerusalem, Israel. He was a silver medalist at the 2023 European Athletics U20 Championships in Jerusalem, Israel.

He won the Swiss indoor national title in February 2024 in St. Gallen. He travelled to compete at the 2024 World Athletics U20 Championships in Lima, Peru but was unable to compete after suffering an injury in the warm-up. That year, he was named the male Best Young Talent Award in French-speaking Switzerland by Swiss Sports Aid.

He retained his Swiss indoor national title in February 2025 in St. Gallen. Previously in 2025, he had increased his personal best to 5.72 metres and in May 2025, he vaulted 5.82 m in Sion, Switzerland, improving the Swiss outdoor record set previously by Felix Böhni and Dominik Alberto by 11 cm, also meeting the minimum standard for the 2025 World Championships. He competed at the 2025 European Athletics Team Championships First Division in Madrid, Spain in June 2025. He was selected to represent Switzerland at the 2025 European Athletics U23 Championships in Bergen, Norway.
