= Jonas Raess =

Swiss long-distance runner (born 1994)

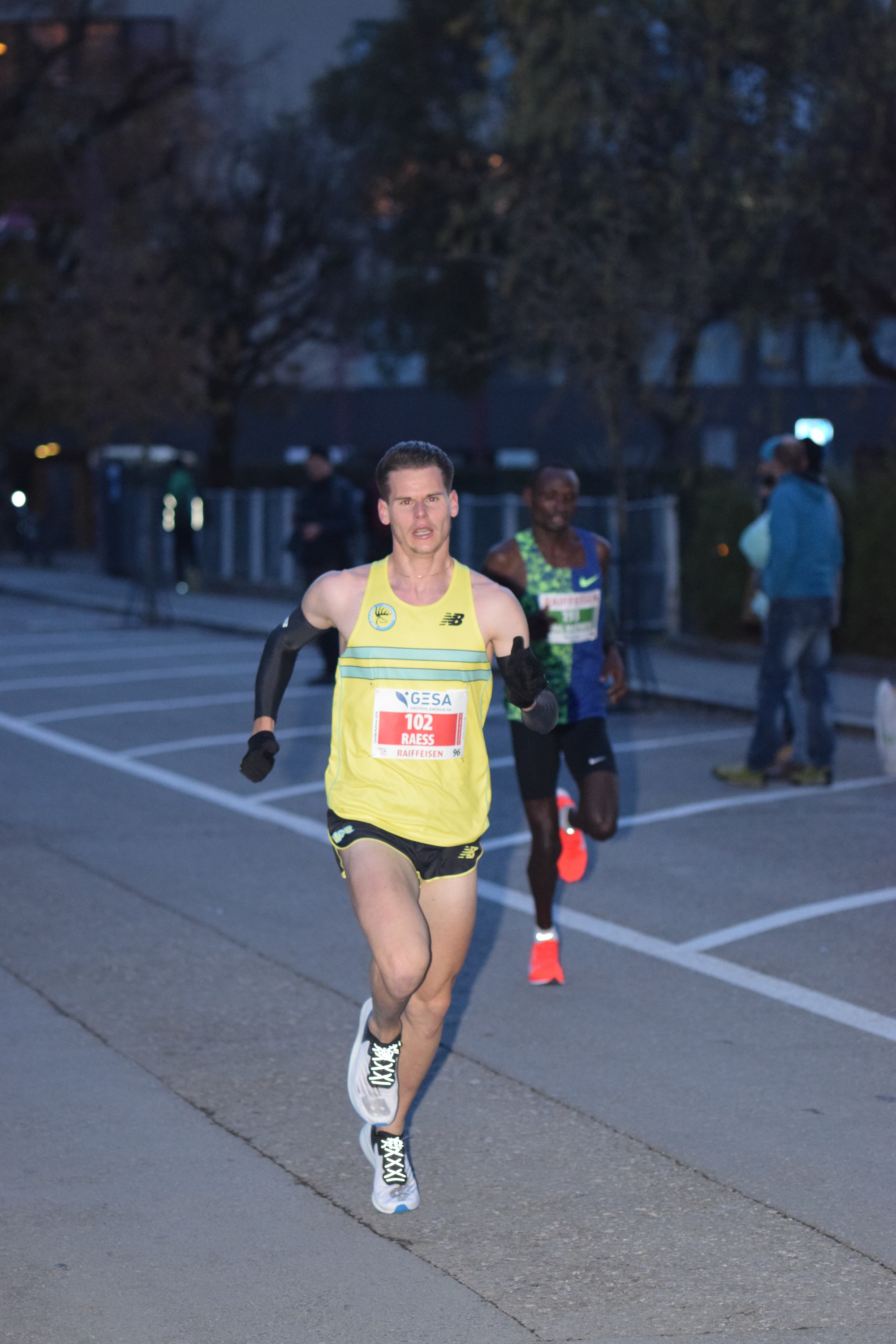
- Raess at the 2019 Corrida Bulloise

Personal information
- Born: 8 March 1994 (age 32)
- Home town: Zürich, Switzerland

Sport
- Country: Switzerland
- Sport: Athletics
- Event: 5000 metres
- Club: LC Regensdorf; On Athletics Club Europe
- Coached by: Thomas Dreissigacker

Achievements and titles
- Personal bests: 5000 m: 13:12.52 (Oordegem 2025); 3000 m: 7:35.24i (New York 2023) NR; 5000 m: 13:07.95i (Boston 2022) NR
Medal record
Men's athletics
Representing Switzerland
Summer Universiade
Gold medal – first place	2019 Naples	5000 m

Jonas Raess (born 8 March 1994) is a Swiss long-distance runner. He competed in the 5000 metres at the 2020 Olympics. Additionally, he earned a gold medal at the 2019 Universiade. Currently, he holds the national title for the 5000 metres and national records for the indoor and outdoor 3000 metres as well as the indoor 5000 metres.

== Career and background ==
Jonas Raess began his professional career much later on, around 2019, once he had completed his education and graduated with a bachelor's degree. The earlier half of his career was plagued by injuries, which caused Swiss Athletics to remove him from its youth team at a certain point.

He credits his mother for getting him into running when he was young. He entered into an annual running event for children and that sparked his interest in the sport. He did road races but never ran on a track until 2004. He was invited to join TV Unterstrass and trained at the club under Hansruedi Ilg. Then, he changed to LC Regensdorf where Ruedi Meier coached him. He is also a member of the On Athletics Club that is led by American long-distance runner and head coach Dathan Ritzenhein.

=== 2011 ===
Raess made his international debut at the 2011 European Youth Olympic Festival in Trabzon, Turkey and finished in 13th place in the 3000 metres.

=== 2023: 3000 metres record ===
Raess set a new Swiss record in the 3000 metres on 10 September 2023 at the Hanžeković Memorial in Zagreb, Croatia. Markus Ryffel, the legendary Swiss long-distance runner and Olympic silver medalist in the 5000 metres, held the previous record for 44 years, ever since July 1979. Raess erased almost 6 seconds off Ryffel's time, bringing it down from 7:41.00 to 7:35.12.

Ryffel congratulated Raess on his achievement. Raess revealed that “Ryffel was one of my first well-wishers. He sent me personal messages. He even sent me a personal congratulatory message via video on social media”. Raess continued to share that Ryffel was happy for him and a big fan.

Raess strives to break Ryffel's other record of 13:07.54 in the 5000 metres from the 1984 Olympics. Raess' last attempt in June 2023 fell short by 6 seconds. He wants to accomplish this goal below the 13 minute barrier.

=== 2024 ===
In late 2024, Raess left U.S.-based coach Dathan Ritzenhein to join On Athletics Club Europe.

== Achievements ==
Information from his World Athletics profile unless otherwise noted.

=== International competitions ===
Representing Switzerland
Year	Competition	Venue	Position	Event	Time	Notes
2011	European Youth Olympic Festival	Trabzon, Turkey	13th	3000 m	8:47.56	
2012	European Cross Country Championships	Szentendre, Hungary	69th	U20 Race	20:02	
2015	European Cross Country Championships	Hyères, France	33rd	U23 Race	24:25	
2016	European Cross Country Championships	Chia, Italy	17th	U23 Race	23:37	
2017	Universiade	Taipei, Taiwan	7th	1500 m	3:45.51	
2017	Universiade	Taipei, Taiwan	8th	5000 m	14:03.10	
2017	European Cross Country Championships	Šamorín, Slovakia	29th	Senior Race	31:00	
2018	European Championships	Berlin, Germany	21st	5000 m	14:01.14	
2019	Universiade	Naples, Italy	1st	5000 m	14:03.10	
2019	European Team Championships Super League	Bydogoszcz, Poland	6th	3000 m	8:04.93	
2019	European Cross Country Championships	Lisbon, Portugal	9th	Senior Race	30:53	
2021	Olympic Games	Tokyo, Japan	25th (h)	5000 m	13:43.52	
2021	European Cross Country Championships	Dublin, Ireland	17th	Senior Race	31:16	
2022	World Indoor Championships	Belgrade, Serbia	11th	3000 m	7:47.28	
2022	European Championships	Munich, Germany	15th	5000 m	13:36.18	
2023	World Championships	Budapest, Hungary	22nd (h)	5000 m	13:37.84	
2024	European Championships	Rome, Italy	16th	5000 m	13:31.43	
2024	European Championships	Rome, Italy	14th	10,000 m	28:17.79	
2024	Olympic Games	Paris, France	12th (h)	5000 m	13:55.04	
2025	European Running Championships	Leuven, Belgium	–	10 km	DNF	
2026	European Championships	Birmingham, United Kingdom	8th	10,000 m	28:22.41	

=== National championships ===
Year	Competition	Venue	Position	Event	Time	Notes
2010	Swiss U18 Championships	Langenthal	2nd	1500 m	4:07.63	
2011	Swiss U18 Championships	Frauenfeld	4th	3000 m	9:04.33	
2012	Swiss Junior Championships	Basel	6th	1500 m	9:04.33	
2012	Swiss Junior Championships	Basel	4th	5000 m	15:28.48	
2014	Swiss U23 Championships	Geneva	4th	1500 m	4:00.87	
2015	Swiss Championships	Zug	4th	1500 m	3:52.38	
2015	Swiss U23 Championships	Basel	1st	1500 m	4:04.55	
2016	Swiss Championships	Geneva	2nd	1500 m	3:58.08	
2016	Swiss U23 Championships	Langenthal	1st	1500 m	3:53.05	
2017	Swiss Championships	Zürich	4th	1500 m	3:53.47	
2017	Swiss Championships	Zürich	1st	5000 m	14:22.88	
2018	Swiss Championships	Zofingen	1st	5000 m	14:20.12	
2019	Swiss Championships	Basel	1st	5000 m	14:19.88	
2020	Swiss Championships	Basel	1st	5000 m	14:02.09	
2021	Swiss Championships	Langenthal	1st	5000 m	14:01.62	
2023	Swiss Championships	Bellinzona	1st	5000 m	13:44.00	

== See also ==
- List of Swiss records in athletics
- Switzerland at the Olympics
