= Soccer For Peace =

- Abbreviation: SFP
- Formation: 2002
- Founder: Ori Winitzer
- Type: 501(c)(3) charitable organization
- Purpose: To unite children of war-torn regions in their shared love of sport
- Location: New York, New York, U.S.
- Website: www.soccerforpeace.com

Soccer for Peace is a New York based nonprofit organization created in September 2002 by Ori Winitzer. Its mission is to unite children of war-torn regions in their shared love of soccer. It was originally intended as a one-time fundraising event, though the outpouring of support compelled Winitzer to develop an ongoing concept. In winter of 2003 Soccer for Peace was invited to attend the first ever Congress of Sport & Development in Magglingen, Switzerland. In June of that year, it held a tournament at Harvard University. The organization's first actual program, an overnight soccer camp for Jewish and Arab youth, took place in August 2005 in north central Israel, and it has held an overnight camp in every summer since though its size, length and location has varied. In 2007 it introduced an after school program, wherein camp participants would join others for additional training, educational sessions and league play. Its long-term vision is to expand its activities around the world.

== Soccer for Peace Cup and Camp Coexistence ==
In 2008 The Soccer for Peace Cup brought together about 300 players from 32 teams in New York City. It was an all day soccer tournament which recruited 10- and 11-year-old Arab and Jewish children. The event raised funds to support the first Camp Coexistence, one-week soccer camp of over 100 children, followed by a year-long program in which children play more soccer and share other activities — visits to mosques and synagogues, trips to Bedouin camps and class discussions on understanding and peace.

== Growth initiatives ==
The organization seeks to expand the number of participants, including females, and the length of its programs, and looks to corporate partners.
