= Chiara Scherrer =

Swiss steeplechase runner (born 1996)

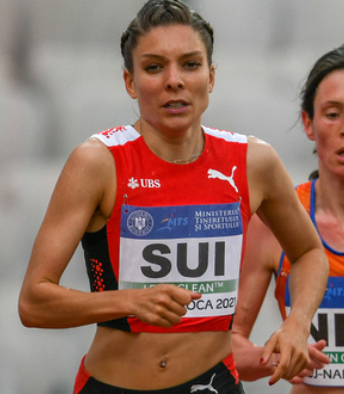
- Scherrer at the First Division 2021 European Athletics Team Championships

Personal information
- Nationality: Switzerland
- Born: 24 January 1996 (30 years, 190 days old)
- Height: 168 cm (5 ft 6 in)
- Weight: 72 kg (159 lb)

Sport
- Sport: Athletics
- Events: 3000 metres steeplechase 3000 metres
- Club: TG Hütten

Achievements and titles
- National finals: 2015 Swiss Champs; • 1500m, 8th; 2017 Swiss Indoors; • 3000m, 2nd (silver); 2017 Swiss Champs; • 3000m s'chase, 3rd (bronze); 2017 Swiss Champs; • 1500m, 2nd (silver); 2017 Swiss U23s; • 1500m, 3rd (bronze); 2018 Swiss Indoors; • 3000m, 1st (gold); 2018 Swiss Champs; • 1500m, 2nd (silver); 2019 Swiss Champs; • 10km, road, 2nd (silver); 2019 Swiss Champs; • 800m, 2nd (silver); • 1500m, 2nd (silver); 2020 Swiss Champs; • 5000m, 2nd (silver); • 1500m, 2nd (silver); 2020 Swiss Champs; • 10km, road, 2nd (silver); 2021 Swiss Indoors; • 3000m, 1st (gold); 2021 Swiss Champs; • 3000m s'chase, 1st (gold); 2022 Swiss Champs; • 3000m s'chase, 1st (gold); 2022 Swiss Champs; • 1500m, 1st (gold); 2023 Swiss Champs; • 3000m s'chase, 1st (gold); 2023 Swiss Champs; • 1500m, 5th
- Personal bests
Medal record
Women's athletics
Representing Switzerland
European Team Championships First Division
| Third place | 2021 Cluj-Napoca | 3000 m steeplechase |
- Updated on 1 January 2024

Chiara Scherrer (born 24 January 1996) is a Swiss steeplechase runner. She is a four-time Swiss Athletics Championships winner outdoors and two-time Swiss Indoor Athletics Championships winner, and she is the all-time Swiss record-holder in the 5K run, 2000 m steeplechase, 3000 m steeplechase, and indoor 3000 m.

== Career ==
Scherrer first gained international experience in 2014 at the World U20 Championships in Eugene, where she was eliminated in the preliminary round with a time of 11:05.00. The following year at the European U20 Championships in Eskilstuna, she was also eliminated with a 10:56.16 mark.

In 2017, she finished eighth at the European U23 Championships in Bydgoszcz with a time of 10:06.41. In 2018, she placed fourth in the U23 race at the European Cross Country Championships in Tilburg. She gained her first senior international experience later in 2018 at the European Championships in Berlin, where she was eliminated in the preliminary round with a time of 9:47.46. The following year, she finished fourth at the Summer Universiade in Naples with a time of 9:47.38.

In 2021, she won the Spitzen Leichtathletik Luzern meeting with a time of 9:40.30, and subsequently finished 59th at the European Cross Country Championships in Dublin. The following year, she improved the Swiss record in the 3000 m steeplechase to 9:20.28 at the Paris Diamond League, shortly before finishing third at the BAUHAUS-galan in Stockholm. She was then eliminated in the preliminary round of the 2022 World Championships in Athletics with a 9:22.15 clocking in the preliminary round and finished 13th at the European Championships in Munich with a time of 9:43.95.

Scherrer has won Swiss national championship medals in the 800 m, 1500 m, 3000 m, 3000 m steeplchase, and cross country.

== Statistics ==
=== Personal bests ===
| Event | Mark | Place | Competition | Venue | Date | Ref |
|---|---|---|---|---|---|---|
| 3000 metres steeplechase | 9:20.28 NR | 5th | Paris Diamond League | Paris, France | 18 June 2022 | |
| 3000 metres | 9:10.33 sh NR | 1st place, gold medalist(s) | Swiss Indoor Athletics Championships | Macolin, Switzerland | 20 February 2021 | |
