= 2026 World Athletics Ultimate Championship – Women's 800 metres =

Women's 800 metres at the 2026 World Athletics Ultimate Championship
- Venue: National Athletics Centre
- Location: Budapest, Hungary
- Dates: 11 September 2026 (semi-finals); 12 September 2026 (final)
- Competitors: 16 from 12 nations
- Winning time: 1:55.88 min

Champion
- Audrey Werro; Switzerland

The women's 800 metres at the 2026 World Athletics Ultimate Championship took place over two rounds at the National Athletics Centre in Budapest, Hungary on 11 and 12 September 2026. It was the first time the World Athletics Ultimate Championship was held, a new competition format without medals, but with a champion's trophy and prize money. Athletes could qualify by wild card or by their world ranking.

Sixteen athletes from twelve nations competed in the two heats of the semi-finals, where eight athletes regularly qualified for the final and a ninth athlete was advanced by referee decision. The final was won by Audrey Werro of Switzerland in 1:55.88 min, becoming the first Ultimate Champion of the women's 800 metres, followed by Keely Hodgkinson of Great Britain and Northern Ireland and Femke Broeders-Bol of the Netherlands.

== Background ==
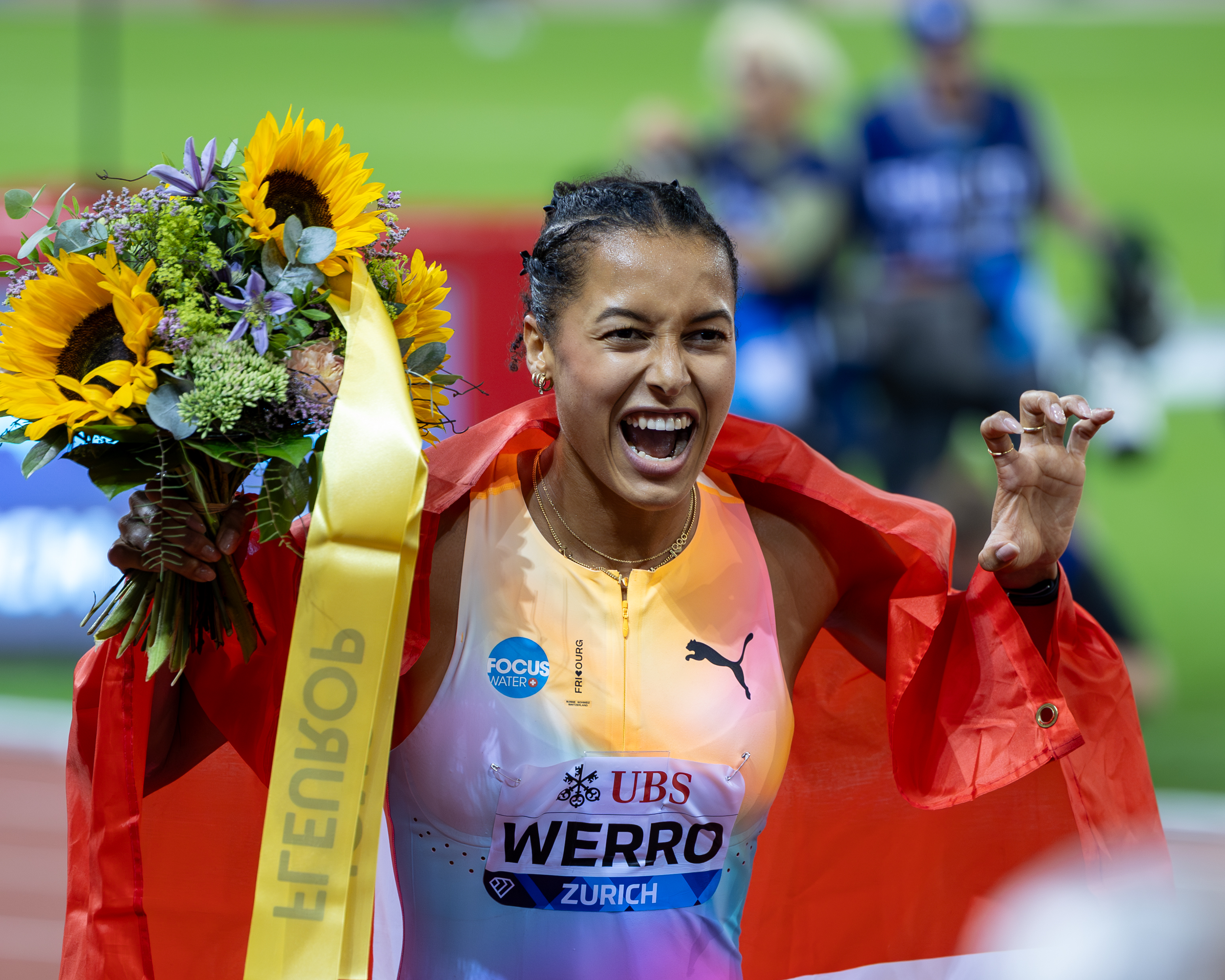
Audrey Werro of Switzerland celebrating her world leading 1:53.70 min at Weltklasse Zürich earlier in the year

In the 800 metres, athletes run two laps on a standard 400-metre track, starting in separate lanes and breaking for the inner lanes after the first bend. Before the championship, the world record was 1:53.28 min set by Jarmila Kratochvílová of Czechoslovakia in 1983 and the world leading performance of the season was 1:53.70 min run by Audrey Werro of Switzerland at Weltklasse Zürich on 27 August 2026.

The 2026 World Athletics Ultimate Championship was the first edition of this championship format. Athletes competed for prize money without medals, where the winner received a champion's trophy and 150,000 USD and the other athletes received from 75,000 USD for second place down to 2,000 USD for sixteenth place. It was held at the National Athletics Centre in Budapest, Hungary.

Global records before the 2026 World Athletics Ultimate Championship
Record	Time	Athlete (nation)	Location	Date
World record	1:53.28	Jarmila Kratochvílová (TCH)	Munich, West Germany	26 July 1983
World lead	1:53.70	Audrey Werro (SUI)	Zurich, Switzerland	27 August 2026

Area records before the 2026 World Athletics Ultimate Championship
Record	Time	Athlete (nation)	Location	Date
African record	1:54.01	Pamela Jelimo (KEN)	Zurich, Switzerland	29 August 2008
Asian record	1:55.54	Dong Liu (CHN)	Beijing, China	9 September 1993
European record	1:53.28	Jarmila Kratochvílová (TCH)	Munich, West Germany	26 July 1983
North, Central American, and Caribbean record	1:54.44	Ana Fidelia Quirot (CUB)	Barcelona, Spain	9 September 1989
Oceanian record	1:57.01	Sarah Billings (AUS)	Paris, France	28 June 2026
South American record	1:56.68	Letitia Vriesde (SUR)	Gothenburg, Sweden	13 August 1995

== Qualification ==
For the 800 metres, sixteen athletes could qualify, up to three by wild card for winners of the event at the 2024 Summer Olympic, the 2025 World Athletics Championships, or the 2026 Diamond League final and the others by their position at the World Athletics Rankings for the event on 3 September 2026. There was no qualification by running a specific entry standard. Keely Hodgkinson of Great Britain and Northern Ireland was the 2024 Olympic Champion, Lilian Odira of Kenya was the 2025 World Champion, but she did not compete, and Audrey Werro of Switzerland was 2026 Diamond League Champion. On 7 September 2026, a final entry list with sixteen athletes from twelve nations was published.

== Results ==
=== Semi-finals ===
On 11 September, sixteen athletes from twelve nations competed in the two heats of the semi-finals, starting at 20:57 (UTC+2). Initially, eight athletes, the first four in each heat, qualified for the final (Q). In the first heat, Veronica Vancardo of Switzerland fell and finished last, but she was advanced to the final as a ninth athlete by referee decision (qR).

Results of the semi-finals
Rank	Heat	Lane	Athlete	Nation	Time	Notes
1	1	6	Keely Hodgkinson	Great Britain	1:57.57	Q
2	1	5	Addison Wiley	United States	1:58.14	Q
3	1	4	Sarah Billings	Australia	1:58.37	Q
4	1	3	Eloisa Coiro	Italy	1:58.48	Q
5	1	9	Shafiqua Maloney	Saint Vincent and the Grenadines	1:58.54	
6	2	8	Audrey Werro	Switzerland	1:59.05	Q
7	2	7	Femke Broeders-Bol	Netherlands	1:59.19	Q
8	1	7	Prudence Sekgodiso	South Africa	1:59.66	
9	2	5	Nigist Getachew	Ethiopia	1:59.69	Q
10	2	3	Valentina Rosamilia	Switzerland	1:59.78	Q
11	2	4	Raevyn Rogers	United States	1:59.86	
12	1	8	Roisin Willis	United States	2:00.11	
13	2	6	Oratile Nowe	Botswana	2:01.03	
14	2	9	Rénelle Lamote	France	2:01.45	
15	2	2	Halimah Nakaayi	Uganda	2:02.62	
16	1	2	Veronica Vancardo	Switzerland	2:16.75	qR

=== Final ===
On 12 September, eight athletes from seven nations competed in the final at 20:18 (UTC+2). Veronica Vancardo of Switzerland did not start (DNS) due to a knee injury. From the start, Audrey Werro of Switzerland was running in first position. Femke Broeders-Bol of the Netherlands was running in second position for the first 700 metres, until she was passed by Keely Hodgkinson of Great Britain and Northern Ireland. The race was won by Werro in 1:55.88 min, followed by Hodgkinson in second place in 1:56.26 min and Broeders-Bol in third place in 1:56.74 min. Addison Wiley of the United States ran a season's best time (SB).

Lori Ewing of Reuters wrote: "The women's 800m had been one of the most anticipated events of the championship, bringing together the three athletes who have driven the distance to unprecedented levels this season," referring to Werro, Hodgkinson, and Broeders-Bol. Jason Henderson of Athletics Weekly wrote: "The leading trio bunched together with 200m to go, but Werro found an extra gear to kick clear into the home straight," and remarked that it had the same top three as the 2026 European Athletics Championships. Sean Ingle of The Guardian wrote: "Werro proved again she was 2026's ultimate performer as she took the $150,000 first prize with another dominant display."

After the final, Werro said: "I'm so happy with the race. I think I have won every race I've had this year during the outdoor season. It is really crazy but, at the same time, it is something I have worked for and now I am getting the result." Hodgkinson, who had an injury earlier in the season, said: "I am actually quite proud how this race turned out to be for me. This has been an incredible season, I really love to have this many competitive women competing at a really high level." Broeders-Bol, who switched from the 400 m hurdles to the 800 m this year, commented: "My season is done and now I can say that I really love this event. I've loved all of this year even more than I expected. This third place means a lot."

Results of the final
Place	Lane	Athlete	Nation	Time	Notes
1st place, gold medalist(s)	5	Audrey Werro	Switzerland	1:55.88	
2	7	Keely Hodgkinson	Great Britain	1:56.26	
3	6	Femke Broeders-Bol	Netherlands	1:56.74	
4	4	Addison Wiley	United States	1:57.54	SB
5	2	Valentina Rosamilia	Switzerland	1:58.53	
6	3	Eloisa Coiro	Italy	1:58.59	
7	9	Sarah Billings	Australia	1:58.89	
8	8	Nigist Getachew	Ethiopia	1:59.50	
	1	Veronica Vancardo	Switzerland	DNS	
