= Dominik Alberto =

Swiss pole vaulter and decathlete

Personal information
- Nationality: Swiss
- Born: 28 April 1992 (age 34)
- Height: 182 cm (5 ft 11 1/2 in)
- Weight: 80 kg (180 lb)

Sport
- Sport: Athletics
- Event(s): Pole vault, decathlon
- Club: LC Zürich
- Coached by: Nicole Büchler

Achievements and titles
- Personal bests: PV: 5.71 =NR (2021); DEC: 7631 pts (2017)
Medal record
Men's athletics
Representing Switzerland
European Team Championships First League
Silver medal – second place	2021 Cluj-Napoca	Pole vault

Dominik Alberto (born 28 April 1992) is a Swiss pole vaulter and decathlete. He is a 14-time national champion and his personal best of 5.71 metres is tied for the Swiss national record in the pole vault.

== Biography ==
Alberto's first national title was in 2016 at the Swiss Indoor Athletics Championships. Since then, he has won 14 national titles indoors and outdoors, all in the pole vault.

At the 2021 Irena Szewińska Memorial, Alberto jumped a personal best of 5.65 metres. Less than one month later at the Hoch Hinaus Cup, Alberto jumped 5.71 metres to tie Felix Böhni's Swiss national record which had stood since 1983.

Since 2007, Alberto has been a part of the LC Zürich club and coached by Nicole Büchler.

== Statistics ==
=== Personal bests ===
Event	Mark	Competition	Venue	Date
Pole vault	5.71 =NR	Hoch Hinaus Cup	Landau, Germany	10 July 2021
Decathlon	7631 pts	Schweizermeisterschaften um Mehrkampf	Payerne, Switzerland	27 August 2017
