= Salome Lang =

Swiss athlete

Personal information
- Nationality: Swiss
- Born: 18 November 1997 (age 27)

Sport
- Sport: Track and Field
- Event: high jump

Salome Lang (born 18 November 1997) is a Swiss athlete who competes in the high jump. She is a multiple-time national champion having won her first Swiss title at the age of 16 years-old. She is the Swiss national record holder outdoors and indoors. She competed at the 2020 Olympic Games.

== Career ==
Lang started in athletics when she was six years-old and switched her focus to high jump in 2011 when she coached by Alan Wisslé. She was a surprise winner at the 2014 Swiss Athletics Championships for her first national title in the high jump at the age of 16 years-old, with a personal best of 1.83 meters.

The following year she needed surgery on both her calf muscles but did take part in the 2015 European Athletics Junior Championships in Eskilstuna and placed seventh overall. In 2016, she broke the Swiss U20 national record with a clearance of 1.87 metres at the Swiss Indoor Athletics Championships in St. Gallen to win her second Swiss elite championship title. She finished seventh at the 2016 IAAF World U20 Championships in Bydgoszcz, Poland, with a height of 1.83m. She placed fourth at the 2017 European Athletics U23 Championships again in Bydgoszcz with a jump of 1.86m.

In 2020 she set a new Swiss indoor national record with 1.94 m in St. Gallen which placed her joint eighth worldwide for the year. She was selected for the 2021 European Athletics Indoor Championships in Toruń, Poland. At the Championships, she jumped 1.87 metres but did not proceed to the final.

On 20 June 2021, at the European Athletics Team Championships in Cluj-Napoca, Romania, Lang cleared an Olympic qualifying standard and Swiss record of 1.96m, breaking by one centimetre the previous national record held by Sieglinde Cadusch since 1995. This secured her place at the delayed 2020 Tokyo Olympics. At the Games, she jumped 1.86 metres but did not progress to the final.

She was selected for the 2024 European Athletics Championships in Rome, Italy in June 2024, where she jumped 1.81 metres but did not reach the final.

== Personal life ==
She is from Basel. She studied business administration at the University of St. Gallen. In the lead up to the Tokyo Olympics she trained on occasion with hurdler Jason Joseph and fencer Laura Stähli.
