= Federal Office of Sport =

- (in German) Bundesamt für Sport (in French) Office fédéral du sport (in Italian) Ufficio federale dello sport (in Romansh) Uffizi federal da sport

Agency overview
- Jurisdiction: Federal administration of Switzerland
- Headquarters: Magglingen
- Employees: 406
- Minister responsible: Viola Amherd, Federal Councillor
- Parent agency: Federal Department of Defence, Civil Protection and Sports
- Website: www.baspo.admin.ch

The Federal Office of Sport (FOSPO) (Note: German: Bundesamt für Sport, French: Office fédéral du sport, Italian: Ufficio federale dello sport, Romansh: Uffizi federal da sport) is the Swiss federal government's centre for expertise in sports and a part of the Swiss Federal Department of Defence, Civil Protection and Sports. Its mission is to promote sports and exercise in all age groups and at all levels of ability across Switzerland, its cantons and regions. It creates optimum conditions for active participation in sports and exercise that go beyond social and cultural boundaries.

The Federal Office of Sport is a service, education and training centre for elite, professional and amateur sports. As an education centre, it develops knowledge and imparts the skills and proficiencies required to practice and teach professional and amateur sports. It also plays a primary role in the development of important national sports facilities.

== Divisions ==
The Federal Office of Sport has five divisions:

- Swiss Federal Institute of Sports Magglingen (SFISM)
- Sports policy and resources
- Youth and adult sports
- National Youth Sports Centre Tenero CST
- Infrastructure and operations

== Swiss Federal Institute of Sports Magglingen ==
The Swiss Federal Institute of Sports Magglingen (SFISM) offers education and continuing education programs in the fields of sports and sports science that cater to the needs of all age groups and ability levels. Its programs provide expert instruction in practicing and teaching sports and exercise, as well as advanced training in elite sports management. All SFISM programs meet the Bologna guidelines. They include bachelor and master degree programs, the certificate, diploma and master of advanced studies continuing education programs and network modules. In addition, the Swiss Federal Institute of Sports Magglingen researches a host of sports-related issues and provides the public, specialists and authorities with a complete range of services.

== Sports policy and resources ==
The Swiss Federal Office of Sport (FOSPO) ensures that national sports policies are developed with the participation of stakeholders. The legal basis for this division is set out by the concept of the Swiss Federal Council on sports policy in Switzerland, which defines the main sports policy objectives and priority measures that are to be achieved in collaboration with private partners.

== Youth and adult sports ==
Youth+Sports Y+S is FOSPO's largest sports promotion program and focuses on youth aged 10 to 20 and children aged 5 to 10 (Y+S kids). The training and advanced training programs for the heads of sports clubs are one of the main pillars of Y+S. Every year trained Y+S leaders, working mostly on a volunteer basis, run 50,000 Y+S courses and camps with over 550,000 children and youth. Youth+Sport offers courses and camps for these leaders in 75 types of sports. The Swiss adult sports program, or esa, of the Federal Office of Sport (FOSPO) encourages adults to play sports and exercise more. In order to meet the various needs of adults, esa supports private and job-related exercise and sports opportunities. esa is a one-stop resource for the sports opportunities and training activities of non-profit organizations (associations, foundations, etc.), commercial sports suppliers and employers (company-facilitated sports activities), and encourages other opportunities.

== National Youth Sports Centre Tenero ==
The Sports Centre Tenero CST is a part of FOSPO and based in Ticino. The CST is used by sports clubs as a training facility and by schools for camps. Due to its modern infrastructure, it is highly prized as a training centre for young athletes. More than 40 different types of sports can be practiced at the CST centre, which has over 160 indoor and outdoor sports facilities in top-notch condition for training and competition. It also serves as a national centre for sports competitions in soccer, swimming, gymnastics and tennis.

== Infrastructure and operations ==
The Federal Office of Sport (FOSPO) hosts between 2,500 and 3,500 courses every year. It also handles the related reservations for sports facilities, accommodations, seminar rooms, meals, bikes and other services. In Magglingen, clubs, families, schools and companies enjoy a professional infrastructure and sporty atmosphere. In addition, FOSPO handles all questions about planning, building and operating sports facilities. From outdoor facilities and gymnasiums to pools and skating rinks, the Federal Office of Sport (FOSPO) advises builders, architects, sports club heads and corporate representatives in all issues related to sports facilities.

=== National Sports Centre Magglingen ===
In Magglingen, athletes can take advantage of sports science specialists and excellent training opportunities. They also have access to the sports infrastructure and services of the Swiss Olympic Medical Centers Magglingen Biel. Overall, there are indoor and outdoor sports facilities, seminar rooms, lodging and food services available for almost every type of sport. Elite athletes enjoy excellent conditions for effective training. For example, the Swiss national soccer team actually practiced for the European Soccer Championship in Magglingen in 2008 because of its state-of-the-art infrastructure.

== Full-time positions since 2007 ==
Raw data

Source: "Federal Finance Administration FFA: Data portal".
