= Swiss Indoor Athletics Championships =

Annual athletics competition

- Sport: Indoor track and field
- Founded: 1982
- Country: Switzerland

The Swiss Indoor Athletics Championships (German: Schweizer Leichtathletik-Hallenmeisterschaften, French: Championnats suisses d´athlétisme en salle) is an annual indoor track and field competition organised by the Swiss Athletics Federation, which serves as the national championship for the sport in Switzerland. Typically held over two to three days in February during the Swiss winter, it was first added to the national calendar in 1982, supplementing the main outdoor Swiss Athletics Championships held in the summer since 1906.

== Events ==
The following athletics events feature as standard on the Swiss Indoor Championships programme:

- Sprint: 60 m, 200 m, 400 m
- Distance track events: 800 m, 1500 m (men only), 3000 m
- Hurdles: 60 m hurdles
- Jumps: long jump, triple jump, high jump, pole vault
- Throws: shot put
- Combined events: heptathlon (men), pentathlon (women)

The men's 3000 metres was dropped from 1990–94. Women's distance events have gone through several changes: the 1500 metres was held from 1982–1989, but has not been held thereafter, being replaced by the 800 metres. The women's 3000 m was added in 2000. The women's field event programme was expanded to include triple jump (1991) and pole vault (1996), bringing the women's field schedule to parity with the men's. Combined events were a late addition to the programme, first appearing in 1996.

== Editions ==
Ed.	Year	Location	Venue	Dates
1	1982			
2	1983			
3	1984			
4	1985			
5	1986			
6	1987			
7	1988			
8	1989			
9	1990			
10	1991			
11	1992			
12	1993			
13	1994			
14	1995			
15	1996			
16	1997			
17	1998			
18	1999			
19	2000			
20	2001			
21	2002			
22	2003			
23	2004			
24	2005			
25	2006			
26	2007			
27	2008			
28	2009	Magglingen	Sporthalle End der Welt	21–22 February
29	2010	Magglingen	Sporthalle End der Welt	20–21 February
30	2011	St. Gallen	Athletik Zentrum St. Gallen	19–20 February
31	2012	St. Gallen	Athletik Zentrum St. Gallen	18–19 February
32	2013	Magglingen	Sporthalle End der Welt	16–17 February
33	2014	Magglingen	Sporthalle End der Welt	15–16 February
34	2015	St. Gallen	Athletik Zentrum St. Gallen	14–15 February
35	2016	St. Gallen	Athletik Zentrum St. Gallen	27–28 February
36	2017	Magglingen	Sporthalle End der Welt	18–19 February
37	2018	Magglingen	Sporthalle End der Welt	17–18 February
38	2019	St. Gallen	Athletik Zentrum St. Gallen	16–17 February
39	2020			
40	2021	Magglingen	Sporthalle End der Welt	20–21 February
41	2022	Magglingen	Sporthalle End der Welt	26–27 February
42	2023	St. Gallen	Athletik Zentrum St. Gallen	18–19 February
43	2024	St. Gallen	Athletik Zentrum St. Gallen	17–18 February

== Championships records ==
=== Men ===
Event	Record	Athlete/Team	Date	Championships	Place	Ref.
60 m	6.58 NR	Pascal Mancini	18 February 2023	2023 Championships	St. Gallen	
200 m	20.97 NR	William Reais	21 February 2021	2021 Championships	Magglingen	
60 m hurdles	7.43	Jason Joseph	18 February 2024	2024 Championships	St. Gallen	
Long jump	8.22 m	Simon Ehammer	26 February 2022	2022 Championships	Magglingen	

=== Women ===
Event	Record	Athlete/Team	Date	Championships	Place	Ref.
400 m						
3000 m	9:10.33 NR	Chiara Scherrer	20 February 2021	2021 Championships	Magglingen	
60 m hurdles	7.81 NR	Ditaji Kambundji	19 February 2023	2023 Championships	St. Gallen	
Long jump	6.76 m NR	Annik Kälin	17 February 2024	2024 Championships	St. Gallen	
