= List of Swiss records in athletics =

The following are the national records in athletics in Switzerland maintained by its national athletics federation: Swiss Athletics (SA).

== Outdoor ==
Key to tables: Awaiting ratification Record not kept by SA Not ratified or later rescined by SA

=== Men ===
Event	Record	Athlete	Date	Meet	Place	Ref.
100 m	10.08 (+0.1 m/s)	Alex Wilson	30 June 2019	Résisprint	La Chaux-de-Fonds, Switzerland	
100 m	9.84 (+1.9 m/s) (Note: doubtful timing)	Alex Wilson	18 July 2021	Georgia Games	Marietta, United States	
150 m	15.05 (+1.9 m/s)	Silvan Wicki	13 June 2020		Langenthal, Switzerland	
200 m	19.98 (+1.5 m/s)	Alex Wilson	30 June 2019	Résisprint	La Chaux-de-Fonds, Switzerland	
200 m	19.89 (+1.8 m/s) (Note: doubtful timing)	Alex Wilson	18 July 2021	Georgia Games	Marietta, United States	
300 m	32.29	Kevin Widmer	2 August 1995		Langenthal, Switzerland	
400 m	44.99	Mathias Rusterholz	3 July 1996	Athletissima	Lausanne, Switzerland	
600 m	1:14.72	André Bucher	1 September 1999		Bellinzona, Switzerland	
800 m	1:42.55	André Bucher	17 August 2001	Weltklasse Zürich	Zürich, Switzerland	
1000 m	2:15.63	André Bucher	24 May 2001		Langenthal, Switzerland	
1500 m	3:31.75	Pierre Délèze	21 August 1985	Weltklasse Zürich	Zürich, Switzerland	
Mile	3:50.38	Pierre Délèze	25 August 1982		Koblenz, Germany	
3000 m	7:27.68	Dominic Lokinyomo Lobalu	20 July 2024	London Athletics Meet	London, United Kingdom	
5000 m	12:50.87	Dominic Lokinyomo Lobalu	12 June 2025	Bislett Games	Oslo, Norway	
5 km (road)	13:12	Dominic Lokinyomo Lobalu	31 December 2023	Cursa dels Nassos	Barcelona, Spain	
10,000 m	27:17.29	Julien Wanders	17 July 2019	Ethiopian Trials	Hengelo, Netherlands	
10 km (road)	26:54	Dominic Lokinyomo Lobalu	12 January 2025	10K Valencia Ibercaja	Valencia, Spain	
15 km (road)	41:56+	Julien Wanders	8 February 2019	RAK Half Marathon	Ras Al Khaimah, United Arab Emirates	
20,000 m	59:14.02	Stéphane Schweickhardt	15 April 1998		Martigny, Switzerland	
20 km (road)	56:03+	Julien Wanders	8 February 2019	RAK Half Marathon	Ras Al Khaimah, United Arab Emirates	
Half marathon	59:13	Julien Wanders	8 February 2019	RAK Half Marathon	Ras Al Khaimah, United Arab Emirates	
One hour	20264 m	Stéphane Schweickhardt	15 April 1998		Martigny, Switzerland	
25,000 m (track)	1:18:54.8	Stéphane Schweickhardt	7 September 1988		Sion, Switzerland	
25 km (road)	1:13:40+	Tadesse Abraham	24 September 2023	Berlin Marathon	Berlin, Germany	
30 km (road)	1:28:25+	Tadesse Abraham	24 September 2023	Berlin Marathon	Berlin, Germany	
Marathon	2:04:40	Tadesse Abraham	1 December 2024	Valencia Marathon	Valencia, Spain	
100 km (road)	6:18:27	Pascal Rüeger	21 February 2026	Ultramaratona del Conero	Porto Recanati, Italy	
110 m hurdles	13.07 (+0.7 m/s)	Jason Joseph	10 September 2023	Großes Meeting für die Kleinen	Basel, Switzerland	
110 m hurdles	13.07 (+1.1 m/s)	Jason Joseph	20 June 2025	Meeting de Paris	Paris, France	
110 m hurdles	13.07 (+0.1 m/s)	Jason Joseph	15 July 2025	Spitzen Leichtathletik Luzern	Lucerne, Switzerland	
300 m hurdles	34.87	Kariem Hussein	25 May 2017	Nationales Auffahrtsmeeting	Langenthal, Switzerland	
400 m hurdles	48.13	Marcel Schelbert	28 August 1999	World Championships	Seville, Spain	
3000 m steeplechase	8:22.24	Christian Belz	4 June 2001		Hengelo, Netherlands	
High jump	2.33 m	Loïc Gasch	8 May 2021		Lausanne, Switzerland	
Pole vault	5.82 m	Valentin Imsand	1 June 2025		Sion, Switzerland	
Long jump	8.51 m (+1.0 m/s) (Note: record set during decathlon competition)	Simon Ehammer	30 May 2026	Hypo-Meeting	Götzis, Austria	
Triple jump	17.13 m (+0.8 m/s)	Alexander Martínez Aimes	10 August 2006		Gothenburg, Sweden	
Triple jump	17.13 m (+1.9 m/s)	Alexander Martínez Aimes	12 August 2007		La Chaux-de-Fonds, Switzerland	
Shot put	22.75 m	Werner Günthör	23 August 1988	Arena	Bern-Neufeld, Switzerland	
Discus throw	64.04 m	Christian Erb	18 September 1988		Norden, West Germany	
Hammer throw	80.51 m	Patric Suter	17 September 2003		Löffingen, Germany	
Javelin throw	82.26 m	Simon Wieland	17 September 2025	World Championships	Tokyo, Japan	
Weight throw	13.67 m	Roland Hotz	12 September 2011	2nd European Masters Games	Lignano, Italy	
Decathlon	8778 pts	Simon Ehammer	30–31 May 2026	Hypo-Meeting	Götzis, Austria	
Decathlon	100m (wind) / Long jump (wind) / Shot put / High jump / 400m / 110m H (wind) / Discus / Pole vault / Javelin / 1500m; 10.41 (+1.7 m/s) / 8.51 m (+1.0 m/s) / 15.15 m / 2.03 m / 47.33 / 13.48 (−0.7 m/s) / 41.09 m / 5.20 m / 54.38 m / 4:43.22					
20 km walk (road)	1:25:20	Alex Flórez	13 April 2013	Poděbrady Race Walk	Poděbrady, Czech Republic	
50 km walk (road)	3:59:20	Pascal Charrière	14 April 1996		Fribourg, Switzerland	
4 × 100 m relay	38.36	Switzerland; Pascal Mancini; Bradley Lestrade; Felix Svensson; William Reais	21 August 2022	European Championships	Munich, Germany	
4 × 200 m relay	1:24.37	Switzerland; Steven Gugerli; Pascal Mancini; Reto Schenkel; Suganthan Somasundaram	3 May 2015	IAAF World Relays	Nassau, Bahamas	
4 × 400 m relay	3:01.18	Switzerland; Vincent Gendre; Lionel Spitz; Julien Bonvin; Dany Brand	2 May 2026	World Relays	Gaborene, Botswana	

=== Women ===
Event	Record	Athlete	Date	Meet	Place	Ref.
100 m	10.89 (+0.6 m/s)	Mujinga Kambundji	24 June 2022	Swiss Championships	Zürich, Switzerland	
150 m	16.67 (+0.3 m/s)	Ajla del Ponte	20 June 2020 (Note: by result and SA news source; 21 June 2020 by SA record page, probably a typo)		Meilen, Switzerland	
200 m	22.05 (+2.0 m/s)	Mujinga Kambundji	19 July 2022	World Championships	Eugene, United States	
300 m	35.70	Léa Sprunger	25 May 2017	Nationales Auffahrtsmeeting	Langenthal, Switzerland	
400 m	50.52	Léa Sprunger	1 July 2018	Resisprint	La Chaux-de-Fonds, Switzerland	
600 m	1:22.85	Audrey Werro	23 June 2026	Biel/Bienne Athletics Abendmeeting	Biel, Switzerland	
800 m	1:53.70	Audrey Werro	27 August 2026	Weltklasse Zürich	Zurich, Switzerland	
1000 m	2:31.51	Sandra Gasser	13 September 1989		Jerez de la Frontera, Spain	
1500 m	3:58.20	Anita Weyermann	8 August 1998	Herculis	Monaco	
Mile	4:23.92	Anita Weyermann	1 July 1998		Bellinzona, Switzerland	
Mile (road)	4:34.44 Wo	Joceline Wind	6 September 2026	New Balance Kö Meile	Düsseldorf, Germany	
3000 m	8:35.83	Anita Weyermann	7 July 1999		Rome, Italy	
5000 m	14:59.28	Anita Weyermann	5 June 1996		Rome, Italy	
5 km (road)	15:34	Chiara Scherrer	8 May 2022		Lausanne, Switzerland	
10,000 m	31:35.96	Daria Nauer	13 August 1994		Helsinki, Finland	
10 km (road)	32:10	Fabienne Schlumpf	26 February 2017	10 km de Payerne	Payerne, Switzerland	
15 km (road)	48:36+ Wo	Fabienne Schlumpf	17 October 2020	World Half Marathon Championships	Gdynia, Poland	
20 km (road)	1:05:14+ Wo	Fabienne Schlumpf	17 October 2020	World Half Marathon Championships	Gdynia, Poland	
Half marathon	1:08:38 Wo	Fabienne Schlumpf	17 October 2020	World Half Marathon Championships	Gdynia, Poland	
Half marathon	1:08:27 Mx	Fabienne Schlumpf	21 March 2021	Itelligence Citylauf	Dresden, Germany	
25 km (road)	1:25:07+	Fabienne Schlumpf	3 December 2023	Valencia Marathon	Valencia, Spain	
30 km (road)	1:42:05+	Fabienne Schlumpf	3 December 2023	Valencia Marathon	Valencia, Spain	
Marathon	2:24:30 Mx	Fabienne Schlumpf	3 December 2023	Valencia Marathon	Valencia, Spain	
Marathon	2:30:17 Wo	Fabienne Schlumpf	15 August 2022	European Championships	Munich, Germany	
100 m hurdles	12.24 (−0.1 m/s)	Ditaji Kambundji	15 September 2025	World Championships	Tokyo, Japan	
300 m hurdles	38.93	Léa Sprunger	3 August 2016	Internationales Abendmeeting	Langenthal, Switzerland	
400 m hurdles	54.06	Léa Sprunger	4 October 2019	World Championships	Doha, Qatar	
2000 m steeplechase	6:12.44	Chiara Scherrer	10 June 2022	Swiss 10000m and Steeplechase Championships	Uster, Switzerland	
3000 m steeplechase	9:20.28	Chiara Scherrer	18 June 2022	Meeting de Paris	Paris, France	
High jump	1.97 m	Salome Lang	27 June 2021	Swiss Championships	Langenthal, Switzerland	
Pole vault	4.88 m	Angelica Moser	12 July 2024	Herculis	Fontvieille, Monaco	
Long jump	6.84 m (+1.0 m/s)	Irène Pusterla	20 August 2011	Gran Premio Mendrisiotto	Chiasso, Switzerland	
Long jump	6.84 m (−0.3 m/s) (Note: record set during heptathlon competition)	Annik Kälin	8 June 2024	European Championships	Rome, Italy	
Triple jump	13.49 m (−0.5 m/s)	Affessi Fatim	1 July 2018 (Note: 7 July 2018 by Swiss Athletics source, probably false)	Resisprint	La Chaux-de-Fonds, Switzerland	
Shot put	18.02 m	Ursula Stäheli	14 August 1988		Zug, Switzerland	
Discus throw	60.60 m	Rita Pfister	6 June 1976		Dortmund, West Germany	
Hammer throw	67.42 m	Nicole Zihlmann	9 July 2018	Spitzen Leichtathletik Luzern	Lucerne, Switzerland	
Javelin throw	62.33 m	Leonie Hügli	14 August 2026	European Championships	Birmingham, United Kingdom	
Weight throw	18.31 m	Nicole Zihlmann	2 September 2018		Aosta, Italy	
Heptathlon	6819 pts	Annik Kälin	27–28 June 2026	Mehrkampf-Meeting Ratingen	Ratingen, Germany	
Heptathlon	100m H (wind) / High jump / Shot put / 200m (wind) / Long jump (wind) / Javelin / 800m; 12.60 (+0.4 m/s) / 1.75 m / 14.00 m / 23.00 (+0.2 m/s) / 6.75 m (−1.1 m/s) / 47.85 m / 2:11.93					
10,000 m walk (track)	45:28:53	Laura Polli	26 July 2015	Swiss Championships	Tesserete, Switzerland	
20 km walk (road)	1:32:36	Marie Polli	8 March 2009		Lugano, Switzerland	
4 × 100 m relay	42.05	Switzerland; Riccarda Dietsche; Ajla Del Ponte; Mujinga Kambundji; Salomé Kora	5 August 2021	Olympic Games	Tokyo, Japan	
4 × 200 m relay	1:31.75	Switzerland; Mujinga Kambundji; Léa Sprunger; Joelle Golay; Fanette Humair	25 May 2014	IAAF World Relays	Nassau, Bahamas	
4 × 400 m relay	3:25.90	Switzerland; Léa Sprunger; Silke Lemmens; Rachel Pellaud; Yasmin Giger	5 August 2021 (Note: by official result source; 4 August 2021 and in wrong team constellation (Helen Burkart, Regula Zürcher, Marquita Brillante, Kathrin Lüthi) by federation source, probably a typo)	Olympic Games	Tokyo, Japan	

=== Mixed ===
Event	Record	Athlete	Date	Meet	Place	Ref.
4 × 100 m relay	41.02 A	Switzerland; Enrico Güntert; Ajla Del Ponte; Felix Svensson; Salomé Kora	3 May 2026	World Relays	Gaborone, Botswana	
4 × 400 m relay	3:12.77	Switzerland; Charles Devantay; Giulia Senn; Lionel Spitz; Yasmin Giger	2 August 2024	Olympic Games	Saint-Denis, France	

== Indoor ==
=== Men ===
Event	Record	Athlete	Date	Meet	Place	Ref.
50 m	5.63	Pascal Mancini	21 January 2023	Championnats Romands en Salle	Aigle, Switzerland	
60 m	6.58	Pascal Mancini	18 February 2023	Swiss Championships	St. Gallen, Switzerland	
200 m	20.92	Felix Svensson	21 January 2024	CMCM Meeting	Kirchberg, Luxembourg	
300 m	35.9 h	Urs Kamber	21 February 1981		Daly City, United States	
400 m	45.92	Alain Rohr	13 February 2000		Magglingen, Switzerland	
600 m	1:17.00	Robin Oester	4 February 2023		Magglingen, Switzerland	
800 m	1:44.93	André Bucher	3 March 2002	European Championships	Vienna, Austria	
1000 m	2:20.73	Markus Trinkler	26 February 1989		Sindelfingen, Germany	
1500 m	3:38.86	Peter Philipp	4 February 2001	Sparkassen Cup	Stuttgart, Germany	
Mile	3:58.79	Pierre Délèze	12 March 1987		Valencia, Spain	
3000 m	7:35.24	Jonas Raess	11 February 2023	Millrose Games	New York City, United States	
5000 m	13:07.95	Jonas Raess	13 February 2022	David Hemery Valentine Invitational	Boston, United States	
50 m hurdles	6.52	Ivan Bitzi	5 February 2006		St. Gallen, Switzerland	
60 m hurdles	7.41	Jason Joseph	5 March 2023	European Championships	Istanbul, Turkey	
High jump	2.32 m (Note: outdoor mark ratified as absolute record)	Roland Dalhäuser	6 March 1982		Milan, Italy	
High jump	2.32 m	Roland Dalhäuser	7 March 1987	World Championships	Indianapolis, United States	
Pole vault	5.72 m	Valentin Imsand	8 February 2025		Magglingen, Switzerland	
Long jump	8.26 m	Simon Ehammer	29 January 2022	X-Athletics Multi-Event	Aubière, France	
Triple jump	16.70 m	Alexander Martínez Aimes	25 February 2006		Magglingen, Switzerland	
Shot put	22.26 m	Werner Günthör	8 February 1987		Magglingen, Switzerland	
Weight throw	20.42 m	Martin Bingisser	3 March 2007	UW Last Chance Qualifier	Seattle, United States	
Heptathlon	6670 pts	Simon Ehammer	20–21 March 2026	World Championships	Toruń, Poland	
Heptathlon	60m / Long jump / Shot put / High jump / 60m H / Pole vault / 1000m; 6.69 / 8.15 m / 14.87 m / 2.02 m / 7.52 / 5.30 m / 2:41.04					
5000 m walk	24:09.73	Christopher Burki	13 January 2007		Vittel, France	
4 × 400 m relay	3:09.04	Switzerland; Alain Rohr; Cédric El-Idrissi; Martin Leiser; Andreas Oggenfuss	7 March 2004	World Championships	Budapest, Hungary	

=== Women ===
Event	Record	Athlete	Date	Meet	Place	Ref.
50 m	6.24	Ajla Del Ponte	3 February 2026	Czech Indoor Gala	Ostrava, Czech Republic	
60 m	6.96	Mujinga Kambundji	18 March 2022	World Championships	Belgrade, Serbia	
200 m	22.88	Léa Sprunger	18 February 2018	Swiss Championships	Magglingen, Switzerland	
300 m	36.72	Léa Sprunger	10 February 2019	Meeting Metz Mosell Athlélor	Metz, France	
400 m	51.28	Léa Sprunger	15 February 2018	Copernicus Cup	Toruń, Poland	
600 m	1:27.08	Selina Büchel	2 February 2019		Magglingen, Switzerland	
800 m	1:56.64	Audrey Werro	22 March 2026	World Championships	Toruń, Poland	
1000 m	2:37.10	Sandra Gasser	13 March 1990		Madrid, Spain	
1500 m	4:06.55	Joceline Wind	3 February 2026	Czech Indoor Gala	Ostrava, Czech Republic	
Mile	4:37.02	Joceline Wind	1 February 2026	Meeting de L'Eure	Val-de-Reuil, France	
2000 m	5:44.88	Joceline Wind	19 February 2026	Meeting Hauts-de-France Pas-de-Calais	Liévin, France	
3000 m	8:59.68	Agnès McTighe	31 January 2025	BU John Thomas Terrier Classic	Boston, United States	
5000 m	16:42.53	Martina Tresch	7 February 2014	39th Annual Frank Sevigne Husker Invitational	Lincoln, United States	
50 m hurdles	6.73	Julie Baumann	7 February 1993		Grenoble, France	
60 m hurdles	7.67	Ditaji Kambundji	7 March 2025	European Championships	Apeldoorn, Netherlands	
High jump	1.94 m	Salome Lang	16 February 2020	Swiss Championships	St. Gallen, Switzerland	
Pole vault	4.80 m	Nicole Büchler	17 March 2016	World Championships	Portland, United States	
Pole vault	4.80 m	Angelica Moser (Note: by World Athletics source; Angelika Moser by SA source)	8 March 2025	European Championships	Apeldoorn, Netherlands	
Long jump	6.90 m	Annik Kälin	8 March 2025	European Championships	Apeldoorn, Netherlands	
Triple jump	13.45 m	Claudia Vetsch	19 February 1995		Magglingen, Switzerland	
Shot put	18.75 m	Ursula Stäheli	25 January 1987		Magglingen, Switzerland	
Weight throw	18.61 m	Nicole Zihlmann	28 January 2020	Int. Indoor Werpwedstrijd	Sittard, Netherlands	
Pentathlon	4507 pts	Annik Kälin	7 February 2021	Swiss Combined Events Championships	Magglingen, Switzerland	
Pentathlon	60m H / High jump / Shot put / Long jump / 800m; 8.14 / 1.75 m / 13.14 m / 6.47 m / 2:24.80					
3000 m walk	17:38.23	Christine Celant	12 January 2008		Vittel, France	
4 × 200 m relay	1:44.39	LC Schaffhausen; Michelle Baumer; Daphne Zubler; Annina Fahr; Lydia Boll	27 January 2018		Sindelfingen, Germany	
4 × 400 m relay	3:33.72	Switzerland; Cornelia Halbheer; Léa Sprunger; Fanette Humair; Yasmin Giger	3 March 2019	European Championships	Glasgow, United Kingdom	
