= 2026 Weltklasse Zürich =

Athletics meeting in Zurich, Switzerland

- Dates: 26–27 August 2026
- Host city: Zürich
- Venue: Letzigrund
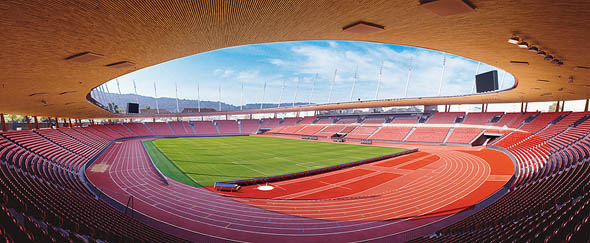
- Level: 2026 Diamond League

The 2026 Weltklasse Zürich was the 65th edition of the annual outdoor track and field meeting held in Zürich. Held on 26 and 27 August at Letzigrund, it was the fourteenth leg of the 2026 Diamond League – the highest level international track and field circuit.

== Diamond+ events results ==
=== Men ===
200 Metres
| Place | Athlete | Nation | Time | Points | Notes |
|---|---|---|---|---|---|
| 1st place, gold medalist(s) | Kenny Bednarek | United States | 19.62 | 8 | WL |
| 2nd place, silver medalist(s) | Sinesipho Dambile | South Africa | 19.82 | 7 | |
| 3rd place, bronze medalist(s) | Andre De Grasse | Canada | 20.03 | 6 | |
| 4 | Makanakaishe Charamba | Zimbabwe | 20.10 | 5 | |
| 5 | José Figueroa | Puerto Rico | 20.32 [.313] | 4 | |
| 6 | Bryan Levell | Jamaica | 20.32 [.314] | 3 | |
| 7 | Timothé Mumenthaler | Switzerland | 20.34 | 2 | |
| 8 | Reynier Mena | Cuba | 20.73 | 1 | |
| | | | Wind: (−0.4 m/s) | | |

1500 Metres
| Place | Athlete | Nation | Time | Points | Notes |
|---|---|---|---|---|---|
| 1st place, gold medalist(s) | Cole Hocker | United States | 3:31.71 | 8 | |
| 2nd place, silver medalist(s) | Phanuel Koech | Kenya | 3:31.84 | 7 | |
| 3rd place, bronze medalist(s) | Yared Nuguse | United States | 3:31.85 | 6 | |
| 4 | Anass Essayi | Morocco | 3:32.05 | 5 | |
| 5 | Jakob Ingebrigtsen | Norway | 3:32.16 | 4 | |
| 6 | Hobbs Kessler | United States | 3:32.35 | 3 | |
| 7 | Vincent Ciattei | United States | 3:32.50 | 2 | |
| 8 | Robert Farken | Germany | 3:32.63 | 1 | |
| 9 | Jake Heyward | Great Britain | 3:32.73 | | |
| 10 | Ethan Strand | United States | 3:32.95 | | |
| 11 | Timothy Cheruiyot | Kenya | 3:33.01 | | |
| 12 | Stefan Nillessen | Netherlands | 3:33.59 | | |
| 13 | Azeddine Habz | France | 3:33.88 | | |
| 14 | Anas Chaoudar | France | 3:34.38 | | |
| 15 | Isaac Nader | Portugal | 3:35.31 | | |
| 16 | Samuel Pihlström | Sweden | 3:39.15 | | |
| — | Žan Rudolf | Slovenia | DNF | | PM |
| — | Ben Claridge | Great Britain | DNF | | PM |

400 Metres hurdles
| Place | Athlete | Nation | Time | Points | Notes |
|---|---|---|---|---|---|
| 1st place, gold medalist(s) | Alison dos Santos | Brazil | 45.80 | 8 | WR |
| 2nd place, silver medalist(s) | Karsten Warholm | Norway | 46.69 | 7 | |
| 3rd place, bronze medalist(s) | Ezekiel Nathaniel | Nigeria | 47.50 | 6 | |
| 4 | Matheus Lima | Brazil | 47.57 | 5 | |
| 5 | Abderrahman Samba | Qatar | 47.77 | 4 | SB |
| 6 | Matic Ian Guček | Slovenia | 47.80 | 3 | NR |
| 7 | Dany Brand | Switzerland | 48.92 | 2 | PB |
| 8 | Chris Robinson | United States | 51.41 | 1 | |

Long jump
| Place | Athlete | Nation | Distance | Points | Notes |
|---|---|---|---|---|---|
| 1st place, gold medalist(s) | Miltiadis Tentoglou | Greece | 8.45 m (+0.4 m/s) | 8 | |
| 2nd place, silver medalist(s) | Tajay Gayle | Jamaica | 8.43 m (−0.3 m/s) | 7 | SB |
| 3rd place, bronze medalist(s) | Wayne Pinnock | Jamaica | 8.33 m (+0.4 m/s) | 6 | |
| 4 | Jorge A. Hodelín | Cuba | 8.32 m (+0.3 m/s) | 5 | |
| 5 | Bozhidar Sarâboyukov | Bulgaria | 8.16 m (−0.7 m/s) | 4 | |
| 6 | Simon Ehammer | Switzerland | 8.14 m (+0.3 m/s) | 3 | |
| 7 | Luka Bošković | Serbia | 8.09 m (−0.4 m/s) | 2 | |
| 8 | Lester Lescay | Spain | 7.85 m (+0.1 m/s) | 1 | |
| 9 | Francesco Inzoli | Italy | 7.81 m (−0.4 m/s) | | |
| 10 | Erwan Konaté | France | 7.79 m (−0.1 m/s) | | |

=== Women ===
100 Metres
| Place | Athlete | Nation | Time | Points | Notes |
|---|---|---|---|---|---|
| 1st place, gold medalist(s) | Julien Alfred | Saint Lucia | 10.70 [.693] | 8 | NR |
| 2nd place, silver medalist(s) | Melissa Jefferson-Wooden | United States | 10.70 [.698] | 7 | SB |
| 3rd place, bronze medalist(s) | Sha'Carri Richardson | United States | 10.97 | 6 | |
| 4 | Tina Clayton | Jamaica | 10.98 | 5 | |
| 5 | Amy Hunt | Great Britain | 11.04 | 4 | |
| 6 | Brianna Lyston | Jamaica | 11.13 | 3 | |
| 7 | Jonielle Smith | Jamaica | 11.14 | 2 | |
| 8 | Zoe Hobbs | New Zealand | 11.18 | 1 | |
| 9 | Géraldine Di Tizio-Frey | Switzerland | 11.21 | | |
| | | | Wind: (−0.7 m/s) | | |

800 Metres
| Place | Athlete | Nation | Time | Points | Notes |
|---|---|---|---|---|---|
| 1st place, gold medalist(s) | Audrey Werro | Switzerland | 1:53.70 | 8 | DLR, NR, WL |
| 2nd place, silver medalist(s) | Femke Broeders-Bol | Netherlands | 1:54.71 | 7 | NR |
| 3rd place, bronze medalist(s) | Georgia Hunter Bell | Great Britain | 1:55.03 | 6 | SB |
| 4 | Saida Tsehaye | Ethiopia | 1:57.33 | 5 | |
| 5 | Sarah Billings | Australia | 1:58.24 | 4 | |
| 6 | Veronica Vancardo | Switzerland | 1:58.49 | 3 | |
| 7 | Eloisa Coiro | Italy | 1:58.53 | 2 | |
| 8 | Valentina Rosamilia | Switzerland | 1:59.46 | 1 | |
| 9 | Jessica Hull | Australia | 1:59.67 | | |
| — | Myrte van der Schoot | Netherlands | DNF | | PM |

100 Metres hurdles
| Place | Athlete | Nation | Time | Points | Notes |
|---|---|---|---|---|---|
| 1st place, gold medalist(s) | Masai Russell | United States | 12.09 | 8 | WR |
| 2nd place, silver medalist(s) | Tobi Amusan | Nigeria | 12.23 | 7 | SB |
| 3rd place, bronze medalist(s) | Nadine Visser | Netherlands | 12.34 | 6 | SB |
| 4 | Danielle Williams | Jamaica | 12.56 | 5 | |
| 5 | Ackera Nugent | Jamaica | 12.69 | 4 | |
| 6 | Pia Skrzyszowska | Poland | 12.70 | 3 | |
| 7 | Ditaji Kambundji | Switzerland | 12.82 | 2 | |
| 8 | Annik Kälin | Switzerland | 12.87 | 1 | |
| 9 | Alaysha Johnson | United States | 15.15 | | |
| | | | Wind: (±0.0 m/s) | | |

High jump
| Place | Athlete | Nation | Height | Points | Notes |
|---|---|---|---|---|---|
| 1st place, gold medalist(s) | Nicola Olyslagers | Australia | 2.02 m | 8 | SB |
| 2nd place, silver medalist(s) | Iryna Herashchenko | Ukraine | 2.00 m | 7 | =PB |
| 3rd place, bronze medalist(s) | Marija Vuković | Montenegro | 1.98 m | 6 | =NR |
| 4 | Lamara Distin | Jamaica | 1.96 m | 5 | =SB |
| 4 | Yaroslava Mahuchikh | Ukraine | 1.96 m | 5 | |
| 6 | Eleanor Patterson | Australia | 1.96 m | 3 | |
| 7 | Angelina Topić | Serbia | 1.93 m | 2 | |
| 8 | Maria Żodzik | Poland | 1.93 m | 1 | |
| 9 | Yuliya Levchenko | Ukraine | 1.89 m | | |
| 10 | Marithé Engondo | Switzerland | 1.80 m | | |

== Diamond events results ==
=== Men ===
3000 Metres
| Place | Athlete | Nation | Time | Points | Notes |
|---|---|---|---|---|---|
| 1st place, gold medalist(s) | Parker Wolfe | United States | 7:27.43 | 8 | MR, PB |
| 2nd place, silver medalist(s) | Graham Blanks | United States | 7:27.92 | 7 | PB |
| 3rd place, bronze medalist(s) | Cameron Myers | Australia | 7:27.97 | 6 | |
| 4 | Egide Ntakarutimana | Burundi | 7:28.13 | 5 | PB |
| 5 | Biniam Mehary | Ethiopia | 7:28.18 | 4 | PB |
| 6 | Ky Robinson | Australia | 7:29.13 | 3 | PB |
| 7 | Grant Fisher | United States | 7:29.74 | 2 | SB |
| 8 | Nico Young | United States | 7:31.76 | 1 | PB |
| 9 | Abdihamid Nur | United States | 7:33.30 | | PB |
| 10 | Mezgebu Sime | Ethiopia | 7:35.56 | | PB |
| 11 | Abdrselam Worku | Ethiopia | 7:35.70 | | |
| 12 | Waberi Igueh Houssein | Djibouti | 7:44.39 | | |
| 13 | Abdisa Fayisa | Ethiopia | 7:46.23 | | |
| 14 | Dominic Lokinyomo Lobalu | Switzerland | 7:49.51 | | SB |
| 15 | Eduardo Herrera | Mexico | 7:50.45 | | |
| — | Boaz Kiprugut | Kenya | DNF | | PM |
| — | Filip Ostrowski | Poland | DNF | | PM |

Shot put
| Place | Athlete | Nation | Distance | Points | Notes |
|---|---|---|---|---|---|
| 1st place, gold medalist(s) | Jordan Geist | United States | 22.53 m | 8 | PB |
| 2nd place, silver medalist(s) | Rajindra Campbell | Jamaica | 22.22 m | 7 | |
| 3rd place, bronze medalist(s) | Leonardo Fabbri | Italy | 22.16 m | 6 | |
| 4 | Joe Kovacs | United States | 21.65 m | 5 | |
| 5 | Roger Steen | United States | 21.53 m | 4 | |
| 6 | Tom Walsh | New Zealand | 21.48 m | 3 | |
| 7 | Adrian Piperi | United States | 21.32 m | 2 | |
| 8 | Payton Otterdahl | United States | 20.66 m | 1 | |
| 9 | Chukwuebuka Enekwechi | Nigeria | 20.43 m | | |
| 10 | Uziel Muñoz | Mexico | 20.23 m | | |

Javelin throw
| Place | Athlete | Nation | Distance | Points | Notes |
|---|---|---|---|---|---|
| 1st place, gold medalist(s) | Rumesh Tharanga | Sri Lanka | 92.07 m | 8 | |
| 2nd place, silver medalist(s) | Anderson Peters | Grenada | 86.93 m | 7 | SB |
| 3rd place, bronze medalist(s) | Dawid Wegner | Poland | 85.16 m | 6 | SB |
| 4 | Keshorn Walcott | Trinidad and Tobago | 83.02 m | 5 | |
| 5 | Julius Yego | Kenya | 81.66 m | 4 | |
| 6 | Marc Minichello | United States | 80.38 m | 3 | |
| 7 | Curtis Thompson | United States | 80.31 m | 2 | |
| 8 | Thomas Röhler | Germany | 79.86 m | 1 | |
| 9 | Simon Wieland | Switzerland | 75.35 m | | |
| 10 | Patriks Gailums | Latvia | 74.30 m | | |

=== Women ===
400 Metres hurdles
| Place | Athlete | Nation | Time | Points | Notes |
|---|---|---|---|---|---|
| 1st place, gold medalist(s) | Anna Cockrell | United States | 52.13 | 8 | MR, WL |
| 2nd place, silver medalist(s) | Dalilah Muhammad | United States | 53.16 | 7 | SB |
| 3rd place, bronze medalist(s) | Rushell Clayton | Jamaica | 53.17 | 6 | |
| 4 | Fatoumata Binta Diallo | Portugal | 53.30 | 5 | NR |
| 5 | Gianna Woodruff | Panama | 53.79 | 4 | |
| 6 | Emma Zapletalová | Slovakia | 54.07 | 3 | |
| 7 | Amalie Iuel | Norway | 54.12 | 2 | |
| 8 | Emily Newnham | Great Britain | 54.81 | 1 | |

3000 Metres steeplechase
| Place | Athlete | Nation | Time | Points | Notes |
|---|---|---|---|---|---|
| 1st place, gold medalist(s) | Faith Cherotich | Kenya | 8:55.82 | 8 | |
| 2nd place, silver medalist(s) | Doris Lemngole | Kenya | 8:55.94 | 7 | PB |
| 3rd place, bronze medalist(s) | Peruth Chemutai | Uganda | 8:58.28 | 6 | |
| 4 | Lexy Halladay-Lowry | United States | 9:11.10 | 5 | |
| 5 | Elise Thorner | Great Britain | 9:11.41 | 4 | |
| 6 | Gesa Felicitas Krause | Germany | 9:12.27 | 3 | |
| 7 | Lea Meyer | Germany | 9:13.50 | 2 | |
| 8 | Olivia Gürth | Germany | 9:15.07 | 1 | PB |
| 9 | Gabrielle Jennings | United States | 9:16.54 | | |
| 10 | Ilona Mononen | Finland | 9:17.50 | | |
| 11 | Alemnat Walle | Ethiopia | 9:20.14 | | |
| 12 | Gracie Hyde | United States | 9:20.75 | | |
| 13 | Alice Finot | France | 9:27.07 | | |
| 14 | Emma Coburn | United States | 9:36.83 | | |
| — | Flavie Renouard | France | DNF | | |
| — | Cara Feain-Ryan | Australia | DNF | | PM |

Pole vault
| Place | Athlete | Nation | Height | Points | Notes |
|---|---|---|---|---|---|
| 1st place, gold medalist(s) | Hana Moll | United States | 4.90 m | 8 | PB |
| 2nd place, silver medalist(s) | Angelica Moser | Switzerland | 4.85 m | 7 | SB |
| 3rd place, bronze medalist(s) | Katie Moon | United States | 4.75 m | 6 | |
| 4 | Sandi Morris | United States | 4.75 m | 5 | |
| 4 | Tina Šutej | Slovenia | 4.75 m | 5 | |
| 6 | Imogen Ayris | New Zealand | 4.75 m | 3 | |
| 7 | Emily Grove | United States | 4.65 m | 2 | |
| 8 | Eliza McCartney | New Zealand | 4.65 m | 1 | |
| 9 | Marie-Julie Bonnin | France | 4.65 m | | |
| — | Lea Bachmann | Switzerland | NM | | |

== Promotional events results ==
=== Men ===
400 Metres
| Place | Athlete | Nation | Time | Notes |
|---|---|---|---|---|
| 1st place, gold medalist(s) | Yuki Joseph Nakajima | Japan | 44.62 | SB |
| 2nd place, silver medalist(s) | Edoardo Scotti | Italy | 44.70 | SB |
| 3rd place, bronze medalist(s) | Kirani James | Grenada | 44.83 | SB |
| 4 | Vernon Norwood | United States | 44.92 | |
| 5 | Lionel Spitz | Switzerland | 45.29 | SB |
| 6 | Ricky Petrucciani | Switzerland | 45.99 | |
| 7 | Manuel Gerber | Switzerland | 46.08 | PB |
| 8 | Haydn Brotschi | Switzerland | 46.16 | |

800 Metres
| Place | Athlete | Nation | Time | Notes |
|---|---|---|---|---|
| 1st place, gold medalist(s) | Emmanuel Wanyonyi | Kenya | 1:41.76 | WL |
| 2nd place, silver medalist(s) | Djamel Sedjati | Algeria | 1:41.83 | SB |
| 3rd place, bronze medalist(s) | Slimane Moula | Algeria | 1:43.52 | |
| 4 | Jake Wightman | Great Britain | 1:43.76 | SB |
| 5 | Gabriel Tual | France | 1:43.89 | |
| 6 | Wyclife Kinyamal | Kenya | 1:44.25 | SB |
| 7 | Navasky Anderson | Jamaica | 1:44.31 | |
| 8 | Ramon Wipfli | Switzerland | 1:44.76 | |
| 9 | Ivan Pelizza | Switzerland | 1:45.05 | SB |
| — | Mohamed Attaoui | Spain | DNF | |
| — | Maciej Wyderka | Poland | DNF | PM |
| — | Patryk Sieradzki | Poland | DNF | PM |

110 Metres hurdles
| Place | Athlete | Nation | Time | Notes |
|---|---|---|---|---|
| 1st place, gold medalist(s) | Jason Joseph | Switzerland | 13.11 | SB |
| 2nd place, silver medalist(s) | Trey Cunningham | United States | 13.19 | |
| 3rd place, bronze medalist(s) | Enzo Diessl | Austria | 13.22 | SB |
| 4 | Enrique Llopis | Spain | 13.35 | |
| 5 | Just Kwaou-Mathey | France | 13.42 [.413] | |
| 6 | Theo Pedre | France | 13.42 [.417] | |
| 7 | Thomas Wilkes | France | 13.49 [.481] | |
| 8 | Asier Martínez | Spain | 13.49 [.487] | |
| 9 | Fabio Küchler | Switzerland | 13.97 | |
| | | | Wind: (−0.2 m/s) | |

Pole vault
| Place | Athlete | Nation | Height | Notes |
|---|---|---|---|---|
| 1st place, gold medalist(s) | Armand Duplantis | Sweden | 6.25 m | MR |
| 2nd place, silver medalist(s) | Emmanouil Karalis | Greece | 6.20 m | NR |
| 3rd place, bronze medalist(s) | Sondre Guttormsen | Norway | 6.00 m | |
| 4 | Chris Nilsen | United States | 5.90 m | |
| 5 | EJ Obiena | Philippines | 5.90 m | |
| 6 | Zach Bradford | United States | 5.80 m | |
| 6 | Sam Kendricks | United States | 5.80 m | |
| 6 | Kurtis Marschall | Australia | 5.80 m | |
| 9 | Renaud Lavillenie | France | 5.65 m | |
| 10 | Baptiste Thiery | France | 5.50 m | |

=== Women ===
200 Metres
| Place | Athlete | Nation | Time | Notes |
|---|---|---|---|---|
| 1st place, gold medalist(s) | Fabienne Hoenke | Switzerland | 22.53 | |
| 2nd place, silver medalist(s) | Torrie Lewis | Australia | 22.66 | |
| 3rd place, bronze medalist(s) | Jaël Bestué | Spain | 22.74 | |
| 4 | Renee Regis | Great Britain | 23.00 | |
| 5 | Gémima Joseph | France | 23.06 | |
| 6 | Cynthia Reinle | Switzerland | 23.36 | PB |
| 7 | Léonie Pointet | Switzerland | 23.43 | |
| 8 | Mujinga Kambundji | Switzerland | 23.61 | |
| | | | Wind: (−0.6 m/s) | |

1500 Metres
| Place | Athlete | Nation | Time | Notes |
|---|---|---|---|---|
| 1st place, gold medalist(s) | Ludovica Cavalli | Italy | 4:03.27 | |
| 2nd place, silver medalist(s) | Heather MacLean | United States | 4:03.57 | SB |
| 3rd place, bronze medalist(s) | Marta García | Spain | 4:03.86 | SB |
| 4 | Lucia Stafford | Canada | 4:04.12 | |
| 5 | Linden Hall | Australia | 4:04.32 | |
| 6 | Weronika Lizakowska | Poland | 4:04.38 | |
| 7 | Joceline Wind | Switzerland | 4:05.41 | |
| 8 | Susan Ejore | Kenya | 4:06.31 | |
| 9 | Katie Snowden | Great Britain | 4:08.21 | |
| 10 | Delia Sclabas | Switzerland | 4:08.44 | |
| 11 | Gaia Sabbatini | Italy | 4:10.75 | |
| 12 | Sophie O'Sullivan | Ireland | 4:12.25 | |
| — | Salomé Afonso | Portugal | DNF | |
| — | Lindsey Butler | United States | DNF | PM |

== See also ==
- 2026 Diamond League
