= Swiss Olympic Association =

National Olympic Committee

- Country: Switzerland
- Code: SUI
- Created: 1912
- Recognized: 1912
- Continental Association: EOC
- Headquarters: Bern, Switzerland
- President: Ruth Metzler
- Secretary General: Roger Schnegg
- Website: www.swissolympic.ch

The Swiss Olympic Association (Note: German: Schweizerischer Olympischer Verband (SOV); French: Association Olympique Suisse, Italian: Associazione Olimpica Svizzera, Romansh: Assiociaziun Olimpica Svizra (AOS)) (IOC Code: SUI) is the National Olympic Committee and the umbrella organisation for organised Swiss sport under private law. It has 104 members (81 national sports federations and 23 partner organisations), to which some two million people belong, practising sports in about 19,000 clubs. Swiss Olympic has its headquarters in the House of Sports in Ittigen near Bern. Swiss Olympic represents Olympic as well as non-Olympic sports and is a non-profit organisation. The big sports federations are divided into regional and cantonal associations. Former Federal Councillor Ruth Metzler has been President since January 2025. Roger Schnegg has been Director since January 2012.

== History ==
Since 1 January 1997, the Olympic movement of Switzerland has been backed by the Swiss Olympic Association. Swiss Olympic came into being from the merging of the Swiss Sports Association (Schweizerischer Landesverband für Sport – SLS) and the Swiss Olympic Committee (SOC). When the organisation was founded, the National Committee for Elite Sport (NCES) was integrated into it. The SOC had been set up in 1912 and admitted by the International Olympic Committee (IOC) the same year. Prior to that, there were no official delegations from Switzerland at the Olympic Games. However, individual athletes competed in them independently on a regular basis. One example is the gymnast Louis Zutter, who was the only person from Switzerland to compete as a private individual in the Olympic Games in 1896. To date, the Winter Olympic Games have been held twice in Switzerland. In 1928 and 1948, the Winter Olympic Games took place in St. Moritz each time.

== Organisation ==
Swiss Olympic is an association and umbrella organisation of 81 Swiss sports federations. The so-called Sports Parliament functions as the highest body. This is the assembly of the member federations, at which the latter have voting rights according to their size. An Executive Board, consisting of the President, the Vice-President, 14 other members and the Swiss members of the IOC, is the leading organ of the umbrella organisation, representing Swiss Olympic externally. An administrative office is in charge of the administration. In addition, the Disciplinary Chamber for Doping Cases and the Athletes’ Commission are also affiliated to Swiss Olympic.

== Objectives ==
Swiss Olympic defines its four core objectives as follows:

- to support and strengthen the member federations and thereby every facet of Swiss sport
- to spread and embed the Olympic values (excellence, respect and friendship) in society, particularly in schools
- to create the best possible preconditions for achieving sporting success at international level
- to represent the interests of the private law sphere in Swiss sport and stand up for its recognition in society

== Olympic missions ==
Swiss Olympic is responsible for various Olympic missions and their delegations. As well as sending delegations to the Summer and Winter Olympic Games, Swiss Olympic also sends them to the Youth Olympic Games, the European Games, the European Youth Olympic Festival and to the ANOC World Beach Games. In addition, Swiss Olympic also organises the Talent Treff Tenero (3T) – a meeting of talented young athletes – twice a year. Together with the responsible federations, Swiss Olympic lays down the relevant selection criteria for the individual major sporting events and then, in a further process, selects the qualifying athletes. In order to be able to offer the athletes the best possible environment at the competition venue, Swiss Olympic takes care of all the organisational aspects in the run-up. During the course of this, the accommodation and the necessary training infrastructure at the host destination are organised, and suitable flights are booked for the whole delegation.

== Federation support ==
Swiss Olympic works together with the individual federations on a targeted and individual basis in order to improve the chances of record performances at the Olympic as well as Paralympic Games, World and European Championships, World Games, and other competitions with the highest status. The service-level agreements between Swiss Olympic and the member federations are each concluded for a term of four years for the purpose of increasing planning certainty in the federations. The agreements stipulate which financial contributions and services Swiss Olympic provides for the spheres of general federation management, ethics and competitive sport, and which responsibilities the federation assumes in return. The various types of sport are classified from Group 1 to Group 5. Swiss Olympic uses this classification as a control instrument in order to define the scope of the financial support. Those sports for which the federations count on a specific support framework for competitive sport, and which are geared towards successful participation in the Olympic Games, Paralympics, and World and European Championships (including Universiade und World Games) are taken into consideration. The different sports are assessed on the basis of the results achieved, the medium-term potential, the implementation of their support framework and their national importance. As well as financial assistance, Swiss Olympic also supports the federations with expertise in the fields of ethics, federation planning, training and sports coach training. In addition, there are various Swiss Olympic Cards for the athletes and officials. Moreover, Swiss Olympic helps to advance the vocational training of the sportsmen and women with various programmes, and certifies medical institutions which are especially geared towards elite athletes.

=== Ethics Charter – Nine principles for Swiss sport ===
The Olympic values – Excellence, Friendship and Respect – form the basis for fair and sustainable sport worldwide. The Ethics Charter of Swiss Olympic and of the Federal Office of Sport (FOSPO) is founded on these values. Its aim is to contribute to sport which is fair and free from discrimination and cheating. The Ethics Charter is a mandatory and integral part of the statutes of every Swiss Olympic member federation. The member federations are, accordingly, under an obligation to designate a person responsible for ethics, who ensures that the Charter is implemented within the sports federation and takes care of the ethical challenges of the federation. The Code of Conduct drawn up by Swiss Olympic and the various programmes are important aids in this. They show how the Olympic values and the Ethics Charter are applied in the best possible way in the everyday life of the federation and at sporting events.

=== Swiss Olympic Card ===
The Swiss Olympic Card is a distinction awarded to athletes – on the one hand, for competition results achieved internationally and, on the other, for existing potential. The Swiss Olympic Card comes in five different versions – according to performance level. It is awarded annually in consultation with the respective member federation responsible. Depending on the variant, the Card offers access to special services and reductions.

== See also ==
- Switzerland at the Olympics
