= Julien Wanders =

Swiss long-distance runner

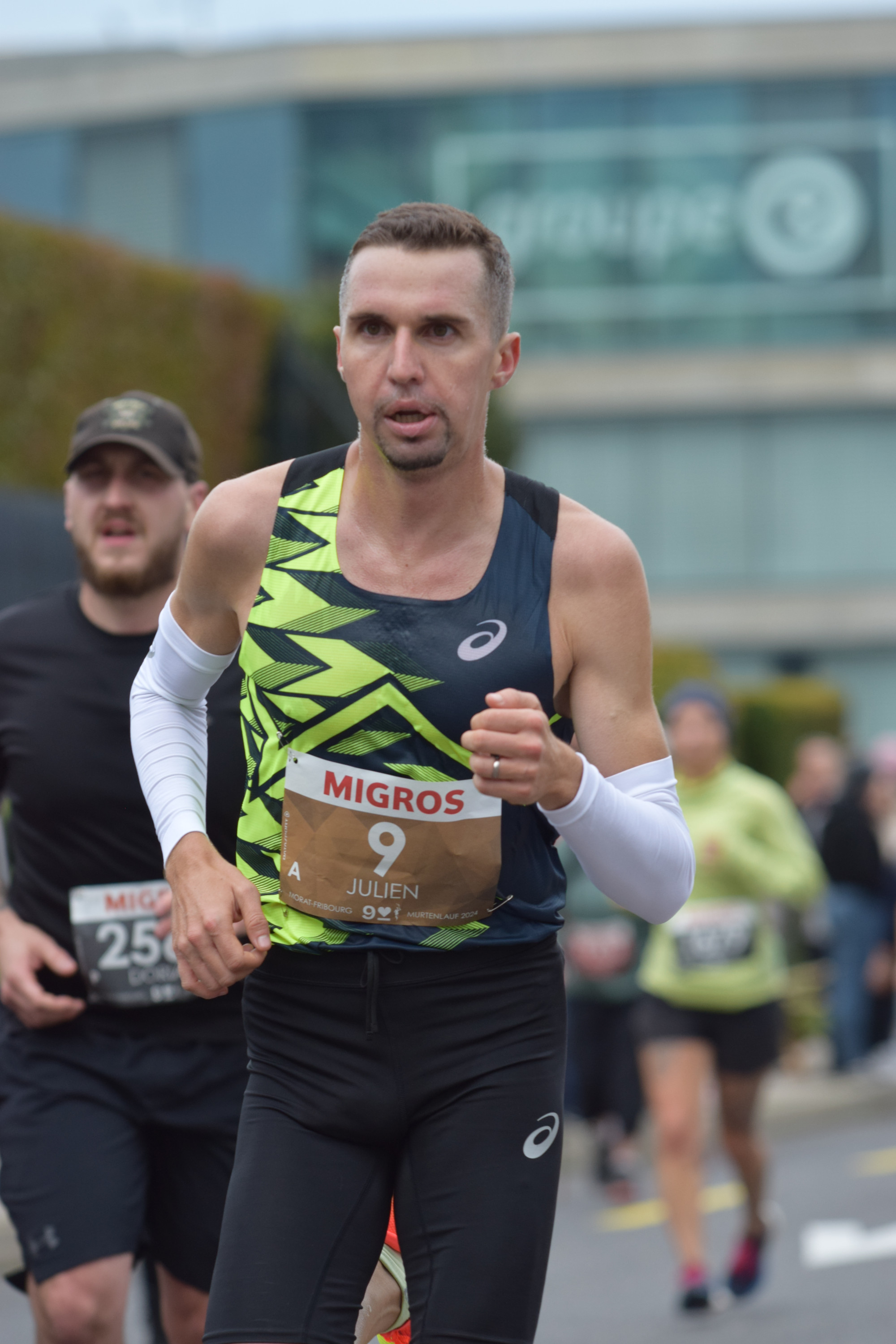
- Julien Wanders at Morat-Fribourg in 2024

Personal information
- Born: 18 March 1996 (age 30) Geneva, Switzerland

Sport
- Country: Switzerland
- Sport: Track and field
- Events: 10 km, Half marathon
- Club: Stade Genève

Achievements and titles
- Personal bests: 5000 m: 13:13.84 (Lausanne 2019); 10,000 m: 27:17.29 NR (Hengelo 2019); 10 km: 27:13 NR (Valencia 2020); Half marathon: 59:13 NR (Ras Al Khaimah 2019)

Julien Wanders (born 18 March 1996) is a Swiss long-distance runner. From 2019 to 2025, he held the European record for the half marathon with a time of 59:13, which was set at the Ras Al Khaimah Half Marathon.

Wanders spends about half the year training in Iten, Kenya, and the other half training in Europe.

== Competition record ==
Year	Competition	Location	Place	Event	Time
2016	Corrida bulloise	Bulle	4th	Road race	
2016	Course urbaine de Bâle	Bâle	3rd	Road race	
2016	Course de l'Escalade	Geneva	4th	Road race	
2016	Corrida de Houilles	Houilles	6th	10 kilometres	
2017	Durban 10k	Durban	3rd	10 kilometres	
2017	European Team Championships	Vaasa	2nd	5000 m	
2017	Corrida bulloise	Bulle	1st	Road race	
2017	Course urbaine de Bâle	Bâle	1st	Road race	
2017	Course de l'Escalade	Geneva	1st	Road race	
2017	Corrida de Houilles	Houilles	1st	10 kilometres	
2018	Barcelona Half Marathon	Barcelona	2nd	Half marathon	60:09
2018	IAAF World Half Marathon Championships	Valencia	8th	Half marathon	61:03
2018	Durban 10k	Durban	2nd	10 kilometres	27:32
2018	Corrida bulloise	Bulle	1st	Road race	
2018	Course urbaine de Bâle	Bâle	1st	Road race	
2018	Course de l'Escalade	Geneva	1st	Road race	
2018	Corrida de Houilles	Houilles	1st	10 kilometres	27:25
2019	Ras Al Khaimah Half Marathon	Ras Al Khaimah	4th	Half marathon	59:13
2019	Monaco Run 5 km Herculis	Monaco	1st	5 kilometres	13:29
2019	European Athletics Team Championships	Bydgoszcz	2nd	5000 metres	13:45.31
2019	World Athletics Championships	Doha	24th	5000 metres	13:38.95
2019	World Athletics Championships	Doha	DNF	10,000 metres	DNF
2019	European Cross Country Championships	Lisbon	3rd	10 km	30:25
2020	World Athletics Half Marathon Championships	Gdynia	21st	Half marathon	1:00:46
2021	Summer Olympics	Tokyo	21st	10,000 metres	28:55.29
2021	European Cross Country Championships	Dublin	63rd	10 km	33:13

== Personal records ==
Personal records
Event	Performance	Date	Place
800 metres	1:51.57	24 AUG 2019	Basel
1000 metres	2:36.15	4 May 2013	Lausanne
1500 metres	3:39.30	3 AUG 2019	Bern
3000 metres	7:43.62	9 July 2019	Luzern
5000 metres	13:13.84	5 July 2019	Lausanne
5 kilometres	13:29	17 February 2019	Monaco
10,000 metres	27:17.29	17 July 2019	Hengelo
10 kilometres	27:13	12 January 2020	Valencia
Half marathon	59:13	8 February 2019	Ras al Khaimah
Marathon	2:11:52	3 APR 2022	Paris
