= Sarah Billings =

Australian athlete

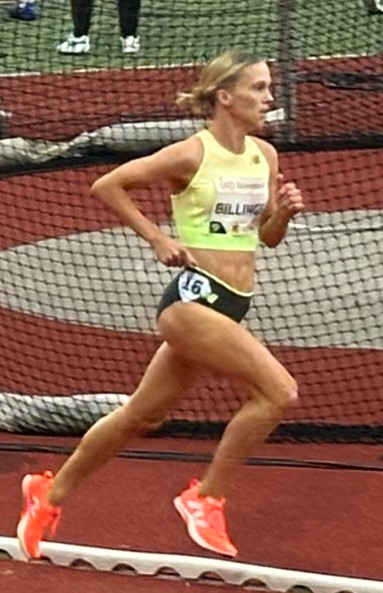
- Billings in 2024

Personal information
- Nationality: Australian
- Born: 7 March 1998 (age 28)

Sport
- Sport: Athletics
- Event: Middle distance running

Achievements and titles
- Personal bests: 800 m: 1:57.01 (Paris, 2026) AR; 1500 m: 3:56.73 (Chorzow, 2026); Mile: 4:32.30 (Whanganui, 2023); 3000 m: 8:47.11 (Sydney, 2024); 5000 m: 15:41.41 (Melbourne, 2024)
Medal record
Women's athletics
Representing Australia
Commonwealth Games
Bronze medal – third place	2026 Glasgow	800 m
Oceania Athletics Championships
Bronze medal – third place	2019 Townsville	1500 m
World Road Running Championships
Silver medal – second place	2026 Copenhagen	Mile mixed team

Sarah Billings (born 7 March 1998) is a track and field athlete from Australia. The Oceanian record holder over 800 metres and the bronze medalist at the 2026 Commonwealth Games, she has also won the Australian Championships over 1500 metres.

== Early life ==
She attended Melbourne University. Billings grew up in the Melbourne suburb of Kew and attended Ruyton Girls School.

== Career ==
Billings competed at the 2016 IAAF World U20 Championships in the 800 metres and 4 × 400 m relay. The following year, she won the national U20 title over 800 metres. She won the Australian national 1500 metres title in Melbourne in December 2019. However, a string of injuries limited her to just four races over the two-year period of 2020–2021.

She was a pacemaker at the Diamond League event in Stockholm in 2022. In November 2022, she won the Victorian 5000 m Championships at Box Hill, Victoria. In February 2023, she ran a personal best of 4:32.30 for the mile to finish second at the Cooks Classic Mile in Wanganui. In June 2023, she acted as a pacemaker for Beatrice Chebet to break a 24-year old meet record at the Diamond League event in Oslo. She ran a personal best of 4:38.97 for the road Mile at the 2023 World Athletics Road Running Championships in Riga.

In April 2024, she finished fourth in the woman's 1500 m at the Australian Athletics Championships. The following week she set a new personal best of 3:59.59 for the distance, inside the Olympic qualifying time for the 2024 Games in Paris, at the 2024 Xiamen Diamond League. She won the 1500 m at the World Continental Tour Gold event in Tokyo on 19 May 2024.

She was selected for the 800 metres at the 2025 World Athletics Indoor Championships in Nanjing in March 2025. She finished second at the Australian Athletics Championships over 1500 metres in 4:11.51 on 12 April 2025. She ran a personal best of 2:33.45 for the 1000 metres at the Xiamen Diamond League event in China, in April 2025. Competing at the 2025 Shanghai Diamond League, she ran a personal best 1:57.83 to place second in the women's 800 m race. On 6 June, she finished second over 1500 metres at the 2025 Golden Gala in Rome, part of the 2025 Diamond League, running 3:59.24. She ran a 2:33.17 personal best over 1000 metres in Monaco at the 2025 Herculis. She placed seventh in the 800 metres at the Diamond League Final in Zurich on 28 August. In September 2025, she competed over 1500 metres at the 2025 World Championships in Tokyo, Japan, without advancing to the semi-finals.

On 10 April 2026, Billings was second across the line in the 1500 metres at the Australian Championships but was initially awarded the national title following the disqualification of Claudia Hollingsworth for a racing incident that saw Jessica Hull fall on the home straight, before Hollingsworth was later reinstated. The following month, she placed eighth over 1500 metres at the 2026 Shanghai Diamond League, running a new personal best of 3:58.81. Later that month, she ran a personal best 1:57.61 in the 800 metres in the 2026 Diamond League meeting in Rabat. On 28 June, she set a new Oceanian record with 1:57.01 for the 800 metres at the 2026 Meeting de Paris. On 31 July, Billings won the bronze medal over 800 metres at the 2026 Commonwealth Games in Glasgow, Scotland, finishing a narrow 0.03-seconds behind silver medallist Lilian Odira. On 23 August, she ran a 1500 m personal best of 3:56.73 in the Diamond League at the 2026 Kamila Skolimowska Memorial in Silesia, Poland. At the 2026 Diamond League Final in Brussels in September, she placed sixth over 800 metres. Later that month, she placed seventh over 800 m in the final at the inaugural World Ultimate Championship in Budapest. Competing in the mile run at the World Athletics Road Running Championships on 19 September 2026, she won the silver medal with the Australian team in the mixed event having placed twelfth in the individual race with a time of 4:32.68.

== Personal life ==
Her brother Jack Billings is a former AFL player for St Kilda and Melbourne.
