= Pascal Mancini =

Swiss sprinter (born 1989)

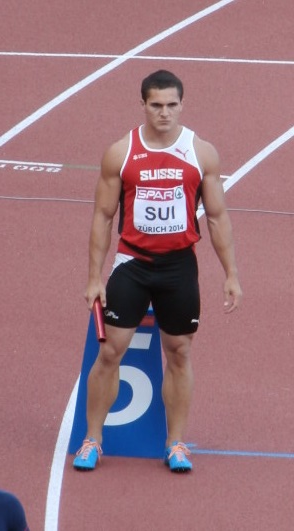
Pascal Mancini at the 2014 European Athletics Championships

Pascal Mancini (born 18 April 1989) is a Swiss sprinter who specializes in the 100 metres.

He was born in Fribourg. He competed at the 2008 World Junior Championships, the 2009 European Indoor Championships, the 2010 World Indoor Championships without reaching the final, and the 2011 European U23 Championships. In the 4 × 100 metres relay he finished fourth at the 2007 European Junior Championships and competed at the 2009 World Championships.

His personal best times are 6.61 seconds in the 60 metres (indoor), achieved in March 2011 in Paris in European Indoor Championship; 10.41 seconds in the 100 metres, achieved in June 2009 in Bellinzona; and 21.39 seconds in the 200 metres, achieved in May 2009 in Genève. He also holds the Swiss record in the 4 × 100 metres relay.

He failed an out-of-competition drug test in January 2012, testing positive for nandrolone, and received a two-year ban.

In July 2018 Mancini was banned indefinitely by the Swiss Athletics Federation due to his far-right political views and racist agitation, Mancini had compared the France national football team to monkeys in social media after their 2018 FIFA World Cup victory and used the antisemitic Quenelle salute in competition.
