= Swiss Athletics Federation =

Governing body for athletics in Switzerland

Swiss Athletics
- Sport: Athletics
- Abbreviation: FSA
- Founded: 1905
- Affiliation: World Athletics
- Regional affiliation: EAA
- Headquarters: Ittigen
- President: Christoph Seiler
- Secretary: Peter Bohnenblust

Official website
- www.swiss-athletics.ch
- (Switzerland)

Swiss Athletics is the governing body for the sport of athletics in Switzerland.

== Affiliations ==
- World Athletics
- European Athletic Association (EAA)
- Swiss Olympic Association

== National records ==
Swiss Athletics maintains the Swiss records in athletics.
