= Swiss Athletics Championships =

Annual athletics competition in Switzerland

- Sport: Athletics
- Founded: 1910
- Country: Switzerland
- Website: www.swiss-athletics.ch

The Swiss Athletics Championships (German: Leichtathletik Schweizermeisterschaften, French: Championnats Suisses Elites d’Athlétisme) is an annual outdoor track and field competition organised by the Swiss Athletics Federation, which serves as the national championships for the sport in Switzerland. The two-day event is typically held in mid-summer and the venue varies on an annual basis. It is open to adults of all ages and is thus referred to as the senior or élite championships.

The competition was initiated as a men-only event in 1906, with women's events being given national championship status in 1936.

== Events ==
On the current programme a total of 38 individual Swiss Championship athletics events are contested, divided evenly between men and women. For each of the sexes, there are six track running events, three obstacle events, four jumps, four throws, a racewalk and a combined track and field event.

Track running

- 100 metres, 200 metres, 400 metres, 800 metres, 1500 metres, 5000 metres, 10,000 metres

Obstacle events

- 100 metres hurdles (women), 110 metres hurdles (men), 400 metres hurdles, 3000 metres steeplechase

Jumping events

- Pole vault, high jump, long jump, triple jump

Throwing events

- Shot put, discus throw, javelin throw, hammer throw

Walking events

- 10,000 metres race walk (men), 5000 metres race walk (women)

Combined events

- Decathlon (men), heptathlon (women)

In addition to the main track and field championships, several other national championship events are held for road running (10K run, half marathon, marathon), racewalking (20 km walk, 50 km walk), cross country running (short and long course) and mountain running.

The women's programme was restricted in earlier years, compared to the men's. On the track, the 400 m was added in 1965, 1500 m in 1968, the 3000 m in 1972, the 10,000 m in 1986 and finally the 5000 m in 1995 (replacing the 3000 m event). The 400 m hurdles was added for women in 1977 and the steeplechase in 2007. The women's field programme was expanded in the 1990s, starting with triple jump in 1991, then hammer throw in 1995 and pole vault in 1996.

A men's 200 metres hurdles race was previously held, finishing in 1967. Women contested this event in 1970 and 1971.

== Editions ==
Ed.	Year	Location	Venue	Dates
	2009	Zürich	Letzigrund	1–2 August
	2010	Lugano	Cornaredo Stadium	16–17 July
	2011	Basel	Stadion Schützenmatte	5–6 August
	2012	Bern	Stade de Suisse	6–7 July
	2013	Lucerne	Stadion Allmend	26–27 July
	2014	Frauenfeld	Sportplatz Kleine Allmend	25–26 July
	2015	Zug	Herti Allmend Stadion	7–8 August
	2016	Geneva	Stade Genève Athlétisme	16–17 July
	2017	Zürich	Letzigrund	21–22 July
	2018	Zofingen	Sportanlagen Trinermatten	13–14 July
	2019	Basel	Stadion Schützenmatte	23–24 August
	2024	Winterthur	Stadion Deutweg	28–29 June
	2025	Frauenfeld	Sportplatz Kleine Allmend	23–24 August

== Championships records ==
=== Men ===
Event	Record	Athlete/Team	Date	Place	Ref.
200 m	20.24 (+0.2 m/s)	William Reais	12 September 2020	Basel	
400 m	45.01	Lionel Spitz	29 June 2024	Winterthur	
110 m hurdles	13.25 (+0.3 m/s)	Jason Joseph	29 June 2024	Winterthur	

=== Women ===
Event	Record	Athlete/Team	Date	Place	Ref.
100 m	10.89 (+0.6 m/s) NR	Mujinga Kambundji	24 June 2022	Zürich	
200 m	22.26 (+1.2 m/s)	Mujinga Kambundji	24 August 2019	Basel	
400 m	50.80	Audrey Werro	25 July 2026	Zürich	
800 m	1:56.29 NR	Audrey Werro	24 August 2025	Frauenfeld	
High jump	1.97 m NR	Salome Lang	27 June 2021	Langenthal	
Pole vault					
Long jump	6.82 m (+0.6 m/s)	Annik Kälin	28 June 2024	Winterthur	
Hammer throw					
