= Magglingen =

Village in the canton of Bern, Switzerland

Coordinates: 47°08′30″N 7°13′01″E

Magglingen Macolin
- Village
- Coat of arms
- Interactive map of Magglingen
- Country: Switzerland
- Canton: Bern
- District: Biel/Bienne
- Elevation: 874 m (2,867 ft)

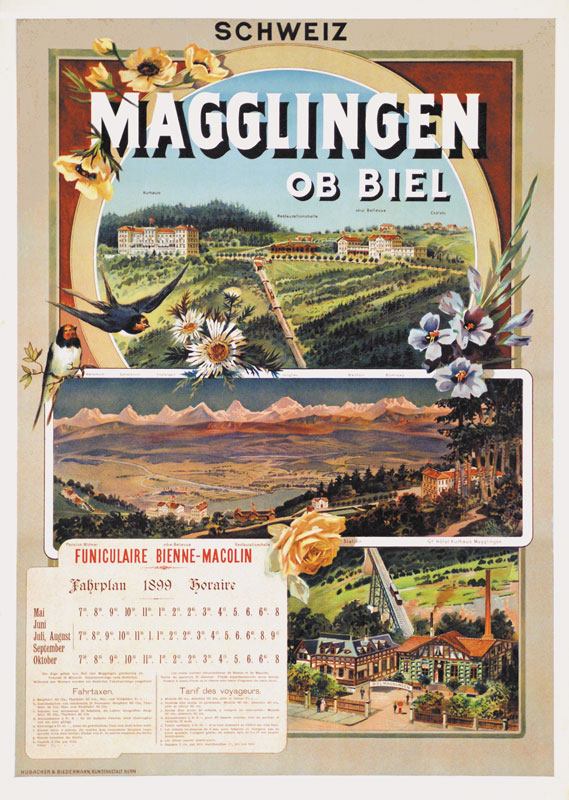
1899 tourism advertisement poster of Magglingen

Magglingen (French: Macolin) is a village in the municipality of Evilard, located in the canton of Bern, Switzerland. It is situated above the city of Biel/Bienne, at the southern foot of the Jura Mountains.

The village is known for being the location of the Federal Office of Sport, which includes the national training center for elite athletes.
