= 2021 Prefontaine Classic =

- Dates: 20-21 August 2021
- Host city: Eugene, Oregon, United States
- Venue: Hayward Field
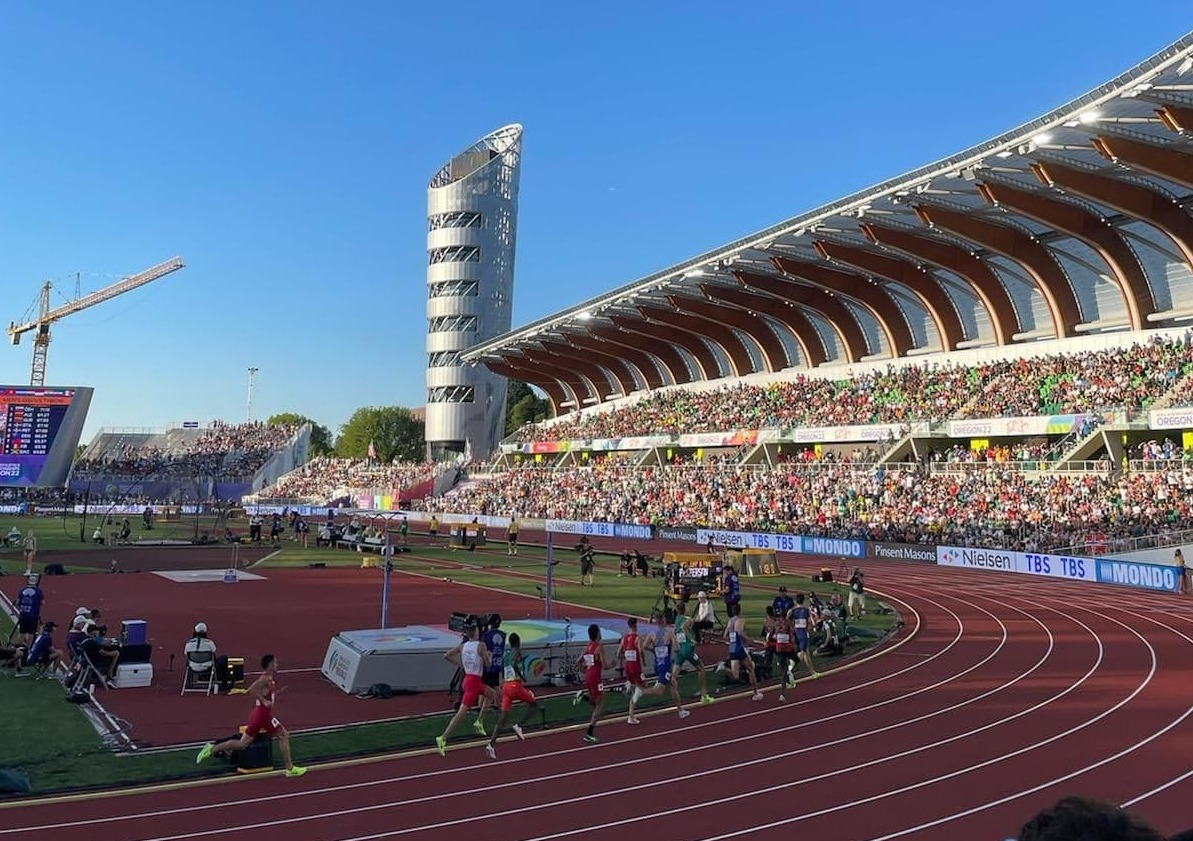
- Level: 2021 Diamond League
- Events: 13

The 2021 Prefontaine Classic was the 46th edition of the annual outdoor track and field meeting in Eugene, Oregon, United States. Held on 20-21 August at Hayward Field, it was the eighth leg of the 2021 Diamond League – the highest-level international track and field circuit.

The meeting was highlighted by American records from Athing Mu (in the women's 800 m) and Courtney Frerichs (in the women's 3000 m steeplechase, becoming the first American to run under 9 minutes). Sifan Hassan attempted the 5000 metres world record, but did not achieve it.

== Results ==
Athletes competing in the Diamond League disciplines earned extra compensation and points which went towards qualifying for the Diamond League finals in Zürich. First place earned 8 points, with each step down in place earning one less point than the previous, until no points are awarded in 9th place or lower.

The top-3 athletes in throwing and horizontal jumping events are ranked by the "Final 3" format, with their best mark overall in italics if it differs from their final trial.

=== Diamond Discipline ===
Men's 100m (+2.9 m/s)
| Place | Athlete | Country | Time | Points |
|---|---|---|---|---|
| 1st place, gold medalist(s) | Andre De Grasse | Canada | 9.74 | 8 |
| 2nd place, silver medalist(s) | Fred Kerley | United States | 9.78 | 7 |
| 3rd place, bronze medalist(s) | Ronnie Baker | United States | 9.82 | 6 |
| 4 | Trayvon Bromell | United States | 9.86 | 5 |
| 5 | Michael Norman | United States | 9.90 | 4 |
| 6 | Justin Gatlin | United States | 9.93 | 3 |
| 7 | Akani Simbine | South Africa | 9.95 | 2 |
| 8 | Isiah Young | United States | 9.98 | 1 |
| 9 | Cravon Gillespie | United States | 10.09 | |

Men's 200m (+1.5 m/s)
| Place | Athlete | Country | Time | Points |
|---|---|---|---|---|
| 1st place, gold medalist(s) | Noah Lyles | United States | 19.52 | 8 |
| 2nd place, silver medalist(s) | Kenny Bednarek | United States | 19.80 | 7 |
| 3rd place, bronze medalist(s) | Josephus Lyles | United States | 20.03 | 6 |
| 4 | Aaron Brown | Canada | 20.12 | 5 |
| 5 | Rai Benjamin | United States | 20.16 | 4 |
| 6 | Jerome Blake | Canada | 20.20 | 3 |
| 7 | Vernon Norwood | United States | 20.36 | 2 |
| | Kyree King | United States | DQ | |

Men's Mile
| Place | Athlete | Country | Time | Points |
|---|---|---|---|---|
| 1st place, gold medalist(s) | Jakob Ingebrigtsen | Norway | 3:47.24 | 8 |
| 2nd place, silver medalist(s) | Stewart McSweyn | Australia | 3:48.40 | 7 |
| 3rd place, bronze medalist(s) | Timothy Cheruiyot | Kenya | 3:51.17 | 6 |
| 4 | Ronald Kwemoi | Kenya | 3:51.31 | 5 |
| 5 | Ollie Hoare | Australia | 3:51.63 | 4 |
| 6 | Jake Heyward | Great Britain | 3:52.15 | 3 |
| 7 | Abel Kipsang | Kenya | 3:52.20 | 2 |
| 8 | Filip Ingebrigtsen | Norway | 3:52.97 | 1 |
| 9 | Matthew Centrowitz Jr. | United States | 3:53.32 | |
| 10 | Mohammed Ahmed | Canada | 3:53.87 | |
| 11 | Matthew Ramsden | Australia | 3:53.97 | |
| | Craig Nowak | United States | DNF | |

Men's 2 Miles
| Place | Athlete | Country | Time | Points |
|---|---|---|---|---|
| 1st place, gold medalist(s) | Joshua Cheptegei | Uganda | 8:09.55 | 8 |
| 2nd place, silver medalist(s) | Selemon Barega | Ethiopia | 8:09.82 | 7 |
| 3rd place, bronze medalist(s) | Paul Chelimo | United States | 8:09.83 | 6 |
| 4 | Jacob Kiplimo | Uganda | 8:10.16 | 5 |
| 5 | Berihu Aregawi | Ethiopia | 8:11.04 | 4 |
| 6 | Grant Fisher | United States | 8:11.09 | 3 |
| 7 | Joe Klecker | United States | 8:11.55 | 2 |
| 8 | Mark Owon Lomuket | Kenya | 8:15.54 | 1 |
| 9 | Nibret Melak | Ethiopia | 8:16.75 | |
| 10 | Michael Kibet | Kenya | 8:18.01 | |
| 11 | Daniel Ebenyo | Kenya | 8:19.67 | |
| 12 | Luis Grijalva | Guatemala | 8:21.98 | |
| 13 | Marc Scott | Great Britain | 8:31.90 | |
| | Josh Thompson | United States | DNF | |
| | Woody Kincaid | United States | DNF | |
| | Bethwell Birgen | Kenya | DNF | |

Men's Triple Jump
| Place | Athlete | Country | Mark | Points |
|---|---|---|---|---|
| 1st place, gold medalist(s) | Pedro Pichardo | Portugal | 17.63 m (+0.2 m/s) | 8 |
| 2nd place, silver medalist(s) | Hugues Fabrice Zango | Burkina Faso | 17.08 m (+0.5 m/s) / 17.12 m (+0.9 m/s) | 7 |
| 3rd place, bronze medalist(s) | Donald Scott | United States | 16.96 m (+0.2 m/s) / 17.03 m (+0.4 m/s) | 6 |
| 4 | Will Claye | United States | 16.83 m (−0.7 m/s) | 5 |
| 5 | Andrea Dallavalle | Italy | 16.80 m (+2.5 m/s) | 4 |
| 6 | Chris Benard | United States | 16.79 m (+2.0 m/s) | 3 |
| 7 | Max Heß | Germany | 16.72 m (−0.4 m/s) | 2 |
Best wind-legal performances
| — | Andrea Dallavalle | Italy | 16.79 m (+0.9 m/s) | |

Men's Shot Put
| Place | Athlete | Country | Mark | Points |
|---|---|---|---|---|
| 1st place, gold medalist(s) | Ryan Crouser | United States | 22.41 m / 23.15 m | 8 |
| 2nd place, silver medalist(s) | Darlan Romani | Brazil | 21.44 m / 21.69 m | 7 |
| 3rd place, bronze medalist(s) | Joe Kovacs | United States | NM / 21.94 m | 6 |
| 4 | Tom Walsh | New Zealand | 21.39 m | 5 |
| 5 | Josh Awotunde | United States | 21.25 m | 4 |
| 6 | Darrell Hill | United States | 21.03 m | 3 |
| 7 | Payton Otterdahl | United States | 20.28 m | 2 |

Women's 100m (+0.9 m/s)
| Place | Athlete | Country | Time | Points |
|---|---|---|---|---|
| 1st place, gold medalist(s) | Elaine Thompson-Herah | Jamaica | 10.54 | 8 |
| 2nd place, silver medalist(s) | Shelly-Ann Fraser-Pryce | Jamaica | 10.73 | 7 |
| 3rd place, bronze medalist(s) | Shericka Jackson | Jamaica | 10.76 | 6 |
| 4 | Teahna Daniels | United States | 10.83 | 5 |
| 5 | Marie-Josée Ta Lou | Ivory Coast | 10.90 | 4 |
| 6 | Javianne Oliver | United States | 10.96 | 3 |
| 7 | Mujinga Kambundji | Switzerland | 10.96 | 2 |
| 8 | Briana Williams | Jamaica | 11.09 | 1 |
| 9 | Sha'Carri Richardson | United States | 11.14 | |

Women's 200m (+2.4 m/s)
| Place | Athlete | Country | Time | Points |
|---|---|---|---|---|
| 1st place, gold medalist(s) | Mujinga Kambundji | Switzerland | 22.06 | 8 |
| 2nd place, silver medalist(s) | Gabrielle Thomas | United States | 22.11 | 7 |
| 3rd place, bronze medalist(s) | Dina Asher-Smith | Great Britain | 22.19 | 6 |
| 4 | Jenna Prandini | United States | 22.36 | 5 |
| 5 | Dezerea Bryant | United States | 22.39 | 4 |
| 6 | Lynna Irby | United States | 22.50 | 3 |
| 7 | Brittany Brown | United States | 22.51 | 2 |
| 8 | Allyson Felix | United States | 22.60 | 1 |

Women's 800m
| Place | Athlete | Country | Time | Points |
|---|---|---|---|---|
| 1st place, gold medalist(s) | Athing Mu | United States | 1:55.04 | 8 |
| 2nd place, silver medalist(s) | Kate Grace | United States | 1:57.60 | 7 |
| 3rd place, bronze medalist(s) | Natoya Goule | Jamaica | 1:57.71 | 6 |
| 4 | Raevyn Rogers | United States | 1:58.01 | 5 |
| 5 | Keely Hodgkinson | Great Britain | 1:58.30 | 4 |
| 6 | Halimah Nakaayi | Uganda | 1:58.78 | 3 |
| 7 | Ajeé Wilson | United States | 2:00.21 | 2 |
| 8 | Jemma Reekie | Great Britain | 2:00.27 | 1 |
| 9 | Sabrina Southerland | United States | 2:01.87 | |

Women's 1500m
| Place | Athlete | Country | Time | Points |
|---|---|---|---|---|
| 1st place, gold medalist(s) | Faith Kipyegon | Kenya | 3:53.23 | 8 |
| 2nd place, silver medalist(s) | Linden Hall | Australia | 3:59.73 | 7 |
| 3rd place, bronze medalist(s) | Josette Andrews | United States | 4:00.07 | 6 |
| 4 | Winnie Nanyondo | Uganda | 4:00.72 | 5 |
| 5 | Shannon Osika | United States | 4:01.16 | 4 |
| 6 | Gabriela DeBues-Stafford | Canada | 4:01.74 | 3 |
| 7 | Tigist Ketema | Ethiopia | 4:02.44 | 2 |
| 8 | Helen Schlachtenhaufen | United States | 4:02.78 | 1 |
| 9 | Edinah Jebitok | Kenya | 4:04.32 | |
| 10 | Gaia Sabbatini | Italy | 4:04.55 | |
| 11 | Jessica Hull | Australia | 4:05.33 | |
| 12 | Laura Muir | Great Britain | 4:05.92 | |
| 13 | Winny Chebet | Kenya | 4:29.00 | |
| | Chanelle Price | United States | DNF | |

Women's 400mH
| Place | Athlete | Country | Time | Points |
|---|---|---|---|---|
| 1st place, gold medalist(s) | Dalilah Muhammad | United States | 52.77 | 8 |
| 2nd place, silver medalist(s) | Shamier Little | United States | 53.79 | 7 |
| 3rd place, bronze medalist(s) | Gianna Woodruff | Panama | 54.20 | 6 |
| 4 | Anna Ryzhykova | Ukraine | 54.40 | 5 |
| 5 | Janieve Russell | Jamaica | 54.50 | 4 |
| 6 | Nnenya Hailey | United States | 55.16 | 3 |
| 7 | Ronda Whyte | Jamaica | 55.57 | 2 |
| 8 | Leah Nugent | Jamaica | 55.86 | 1 |
| 9 | Sage Watson | Canada | 56.52 | |

Women's 3000mSC
| Place | Athlete | Country | Time | Points |
|---|---|---|---|---|
| 1st place, gold medalist(s) | Norah Jeruto | Kenya | 8:53.65 | 8 |
| 2nd place, silver medalist(s) | Courtney Frerichs | United States | 8:57.77 | 7 |
| 3rd place, bronze medalist(s) | Hyvin Jepkemoi | Kenya | 9:00.05 | 6 |
| 4 | Winfred Yavi | Bahrain | 9:04.27 | 5 |
| 5 | Celliphine Chespol | Kenya | 9:07.07 | 4 |
| 6 | Gesa Felicitas Krause | Germany | 9:07.61 | 3 |
| 7 | Peruth Chemutai | Uganda | 9:10.87 | 2 |
| 8 | Mekides Abebe | Ethiopia | 9:18.71 | 1 |
| 9 | Marisa Howard | United States | 9:22.69 | |
| 10 | Alycia Butterworth | Canada | 9:28.68 | |
| 11 | Regan Yee | Canada | 9:44.63 | |
| | Elizabeth Bird | Great Britain | DNF | |

Women's High Jump
| Place | Athlete | Country | Mark | Points |
|---|---|---|---|---|
| 1st place, gold medalist(s) | Iryna Herashchenko | Ukraine | 1.98 m | 8 |
| 2nd place, silver medalist(s) | Vashti Cunningham | United States | 1.98 m | 7 |
| 3rd place, bronze medalist(s) | Kamila Lićwinko | Poland | 1.90 m | 6 |
| 4 | Yuliya Levchenko | Ukraine | 1.90 m | 5 |
| 5 | Rachel McCoy | United States | 1.90 m | 4 |
| 6 | Alessia Trost | Italy | 1.83 m | 3 |
| 7 | Erika Kinsey | Sweden | 1.83 m | 2 |
| 8 | Jelena Rowe | United States | 1.79 m | 1 |

Women's Pole Vault
| Place | Athlete | Country | Mark | Points |
|---|---|---|---|---|
| 1st place, gold medalist(s) | Katie Moon | United States | 4.82 m | 8 |
| 2nd place, silver medalist(s) | Holly Bradshaw | Great Britain | 4.72 m | 7 |
| 3rd place, bronze medalist(s) | Olivia Gruver | United States | 4.52 m | 6 |
| 4 | Morgann LeLeux | United States | 4.37 m | 5 |
| 5 | Anicka Newell | Canada | 4.37 m | 4 |
| | Katerina Stefanidi | Greece | NM | |
| | Iryna Zhuk | Belarus | NM | |

=== Promotional Events ===
Men's 800m
| Place | Athlete | Country | Time |
|---|---|---|---|
| 1st place, gold medalist(s) | Marco Arop | Canada | 1:44.51 |
| 2nd place, silver medalist(s) | Ferguson Rotich | Kenya | 1:45.02 |
| 3rd place, bronze medalist(s) | Emmanuel Korir | Kenya | 1:45.05 |
| 4 | Elliot Giles | Great Britain | 1:45.46 |
| 5 | Clayton Murphy | United States | 1:45.97 |
| 6 | Isaiah Harris | United States | 1:46.00 |
| 7 | Oliver Dustin | Great Britain | 1:46.61 |
| 8 | Bryce Hoppel | United States | 1:47.22 |
| | Erik Sowinski | United States | DNF |

Men's Mile
| Place | Athlete | Country | Time |
|---|---|---|---|
| 1st place, gold medalist(s) | Geordie Beamish | New Zealand | 3:54.86 |
| 2nd place, silver medalist(s) | Craig Engels | United States | 3:55.41 |
| 3rd place, bronze medalist(s) | Charles Philibert-Thiboutot | Canada | 3:55.48 |
| 4 | Sam Prakel | United States | 3:55.99 |
| 5 | Archie Davis | Great Britain | 3:57.00 |
| 6 | Henry Wynne | United States | 3:57.43 |
| 7 | Peter Callahan | Belgium | 3:57.49 |
| 8 | Tripp Hurt | United States | 3:58.15 |
| 9 | Vincent Ciattei | United States | 4:00.45 |
| | Erik Sowinski | United States | DNF |
| | Timothy Sein | Kenya | DNF |

Women's 2 Miles
| Place | Athlete | Country | Time |
|---|---|---|---|
| 1st place, gold medalist(s) | Francine Niyonsaba | Burundi | 9:00.75 |
| 2nd place, silver medalist(s) | Letesenbet Gidey | Ethiopia | 9:06.74 |
| 3rd place, bronze medalist(s) | Hellen Obiri | Kenya | 9:14.55 |
| 4 | Konstanze Klosterhalfen | Germany | 9:18.16 |
| 5 | Amy-Eloise Markovc | Great Britain | 9:21.98 |
| 6 | Elise Cranny | United States | 9:22.44 |
| 7 | Katie Wasserman | United States | 9:40.82 |
| 8 | Caroline Chepkoech Kipkirui | Kenya | 9:40.86 |
| 9 | Katie Rainsberger | United States | 9:41.79 |
| 10 | Taryn Rawlings | United States | 9:55.94 |
| | Addy Townsend | Canada | DNF |
| | Allison Cash | United States | DNF |

Women's 5000m
| Place | Athlete | Country | Time |
|---|---|---|---|
| 1st place, gold medalist(s) | Sifan Hassan | Netherlands | 14:27.89 |
| 2nd place, silver medalist(s) | Senbere Teferi | Ethiopia | 14:42.25 |
| 3rd place, bronze medalist(s) | Fantu Worku | Ethiopia | 14:42.85 |
| 4 | Loice Chemnung | Kenya | 14:43.65 |
| 5 | Alicia Monson | United States | 14:48.49 |
| 6 | Abbey Cooper | United States | 14:52.37 |
| 7 | Sheila Chelangat | Kenya | 14:52.66 |
| 8 | Meskerem Mamo | Ethiopia | 15:01.29 |
| 9 | Laura Galván | Mexico | 15:10.38 |
| 10 | Rachel Schneider | United States | 15:13.15 |
| 11 | Emily Infeld | United States | 15:24.78 |
| 12 | Andrea Seccafien | Canada | 15:32.01 |
| | Kate Van Buskirk | Canada | DNF |
| | Beatrice Chebet | Kenya | DNF |

=== National Events ===
Women's 1500m
| Place | Athlete | Country | Time |
|---|---|---|---|
| 1st place, gold medalist(s) | Rebecca Mehra | United States | 4:06.35 |
| 2nd place, silver medalist(s) | Sage Hurta | United States | 4:07.50 |
| 3rd place, bronze medalist(s) | Dani Jones | United States | 4:08.45 |
| 4 | Nikki Hiltz | United States | 4:09.27 |
| 5 | Sara Vaughn | United States | 4:09.68 |
| 6 | Eleanor Fulton | United States | 4:09.85 |
| 7 | Danielle Aragon | United States | 4:10.02 |
| 8 | Marta Pen | Portugal | 4:10.90 |
| 9 | Julianne Labach | Canada | 4:11.74 |
| 10 | Federica Del Buono | Italy | 4:12.30 |
| 11 | Allie Wilson | United States | 4:14.82 |
| | Alexa Efraimson | United States | DNF |
| | Nia Akins | United States | DNF |
