= 2021 Anniversary Games =

- Dates: 13 July 2021
- Host city: Gateshead
- Venue: Gateshead International Stadium
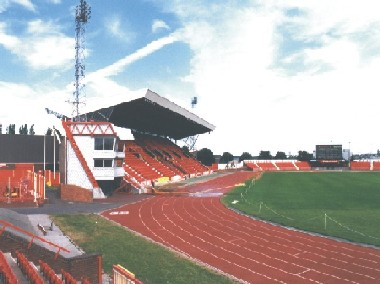
- Level: 2021 Diamond League

The 2021 Anniversary Games, officially known as the 2021 Müller British Grand Prix, was the 68th edition of the annual outdoor track and field meeting usually held in London, though in 2021 it was held in Gateshead instead. Held on 13 July at Gateshead International Stadium, it was the seventh leg of the 2021 Diamond League – the highest level international track and field circuit.

The meeting was highlighted by Mohamed Katir's win and Spanish record in the 3000 metres, as well as Trayvon Bromell's return to form in winning the 100 metres.

== Results ==
Athletes competing in the Diamond League disciplines earned extra compensation and points which went towards qualifying for the Diamond League finals in Zürich. First place earned 8 points, with each step down in place earning one less point than the previous, until no points are awarded in 9th place or lower.

The top-3 athletes in throwing and horizontal jumping events are ranked by the "Final 3" format, with their best mark overall in italics if it differs from their final trial.

=== Diamond Discipline ===
Men's 100m (+0.4 m/s)
Place	Athlete	Country	Time	Points
1st place, gold medalist(s)	Trayvon Bromell	United States	9.98	8
2nd place, silver medalist(s)	CJ Ujah	Great Britain	10.10	7
3rd place, bronze medalist(s)	Zharnel Hughes	Great Britain	10.13	6
4	Andre De Grasse	Canada	10.13	5
5	Fred Kerley	United States	10.13	4
6	Mike Rodgers	United States	10.17	3
7	Isiah Young	United States	10.21	2
8	Adam Gemili	Great Britain	10.21	1

Men's 800m
Place	Athlete	Country	Time	Points
1st place, gold medalist(s)	Isaiah Harris	United States	1:44.76	8
2nd place, silver medalist(s)	Wyclife Kinyamal	Kenya	1:44.91	7
3rd place, bronze medalist(s)	Peter Bol	Australia	1:45.22	6
4	Álvaro de Arriba	Spain	1:45.36	5
5	Bryce Hoppel	United States	1:45.45	4
6	Clayton Murphy	United States	1:45.72	3
7	Jamie Webb	Great Britain	1:45.97	2
8	Saúl Ordóñez	Spain	1:46.02	1
9	Amel Tuka	Bosnia and Herzegovina	1:46.25	
10	Jeff Riseley	Australia	1:50.05	
	Erik Sowinski	United States	DNF	
	Daniel Rowden	Great Britain	DNS	

Men's 3000m
Place	Athlete	Country	Time	Points
1st place, gold medalist(s)	Mohamed Katir	Spain	7:27.64	8
2nd place, silver medalist(s)	Stewart McSweyn	Australia	7:28.94	7
3rd place, bronze medalist(s)	Andrew Butchart	Great Britain	7:35.18	6
4	Jacob Krop	Kenya	7:35.34	5
5	Matthew Ramsden	Australia	7:35.65	4
6	Patrick Dever	Great Britain	7:37.39	3
7	Michael Kibet	Kenya	7:37.80	2
8	Yemaneberhan Crippa	Italy	7:37.90	1
9	Tom Mortimer	Great Britain	7:38.73	
10	Sam Atkin	Great Britain	7:39.71	
11	Fernando Carro	Spain	7:41.20	
12	Jack Rowe	Great Britain	7:42.15	
13	Sergio Jiménez	Spain	7:47.95	
14	David McNeill	Australia	7:49.32	
15	Ben Flanagan	Canada	7:54.32	
16	Jonathan Davies	Great Britain	8:13.77	
	Adam Clarke	Great Britain	DNF	
	Vincent Kibet	Kenya	DNF	

Men's 110mH (+0.8 m/s)
Place	Athlete	Country	Time	Points
1st place, gold medalist(s)	Ronald Levy	Jamaica	13.22	8
2nd place, silver medalist(s)	Omar McLeod	Jamaica	13.42	7
3rd place, bronze medalist(s)	Andrew Pozzi	Great Britain	13.45	6
4	Robert Dunning	United States	13.71	5
5	Rasheed Broadbell	Jamaica	13.84	4
6	Tade Ojora	Great Britain	13.87	3
7	Paolo Dal Molin	Italy	13.97	2
8	Freddie Crittenden	United States	19.26	1

Men's High Jump
Place	Athlete	Country	Mark	Points
1st place, gold medalist(s)	Donald Thomas	Bahamas	2.25 m	8
2nd place, silver medalist(s)	Marco Fassinotti	Italy	2.25 m	7
3rd place, bronze medalist(s)	Fabian Delryd	Sweden	2.22 m	6
4	Tobias Potye	Germany	2.22 m	5
5	Péter Bakosi	Hungary	2.18 m	4
6	Joel Clarke-Khan	Great Britain	2.14 m	3
7	Chris Baker	Great Britain	2.14 m	2
	Dániel Jankovics	Hungary	NM	
	Nauraj Singh Randhawa	Malaysia	NM	

Men's Triple Jump
Place	Athlete	Country	Mark	Points
1st place, gold medalist(s)	Pedro Pichardo	Portugal	17.50 m (+1.0 m/s)	8
2nd place, silver medalist(s)	Tobia Bocchi	Italy	16.60 m (+0.0 m/s) / 17.04 m (+0.1 m/s)	7
3rd place, bronze medalist(s)	Tiago Pereira	Portugal	16.46 m (−1.1 m/s) / 17.11 m (+1.2 m/s)	6
4	Pablo Torrijos	Spain	16.66 m (+0.7 m/s)	5
5	Almir dos Santos	Brazil	16.66 m (−0.1 m/s)	4
6	Ben Williams	Great Britain	16.22 m (+0.3 m/s)	3
7	Nikolaos Andrikopoulos	Greece	16.14 m (+1.3 m/s)	2
8	Efe Uwaifo	Great Britain	15.91 m (−0.1 m/s)	1

Men's Javelin Throw
Place	Athlete	Country	Mark	Points
1st place, gold medalist(s)	Johannes Vetter	Germany	85.25 m	8
2nd place, silver medalist(s)	Julian Weber	Germany	77.16 m / 81.07 m	7
3rd place, bronze medalist(s)	Keshorn Walcott	Trinidad and Tobago	76.74 m / 82.81 m	6
4	Jakub Vadlejch	Czech Republic	80.85 m	5
5	Anderson Peters	Grenada	80.59 m	4
6	Gatis Čakšs	Latvia	77.12 m	3
7	Leandro Ramos	Portugal	76.35 m	2
8	Patriks Gailums	Latvia	73.54 m	1

Women's 200m (+0.2 m/s)
Place	Athlete	Country	Time	Points
1st place, gold medalist(s)	Elaine Thompson-Herah	Jamaica	22.43	8
2nd place, silver medalist(s)	Jodie Williams	Great Britain	22.60	7
3rd place, bronze medalist(s)	Tamara Clark	United States	22.62	6
4	Beth Dobbin	Great Britain	22.92	5
5	Dezerea Bryant	United States	22.95	4
6	Daryll Neita	Great Britain	23.06	3
7	Natasha Morrison	Jamaica	23.16	2
	Blessing Okagbare	Nigeria	DQ	

Women's 400m
Place	Athlete	Country	Time	Points
1st place, gold medalist(s)	Stephenie Ann McPherson	Jamaica	50.44	8
2nd place, silver medalist(s)	Jodie Williams	Great Britain	50.94	7
3rd place, bronze medalist(s)	Lieke Klaver	Netherlands	51.54	6
4	Natalia Kaczmarek	Poland	51.71	5
5	Nicole Yeargin	Great Britain	51.77	4
6	Sada Williams	Barbados	52.34	3
7	Ama Pipi	Great Britain	52.50	2
8	Lisanne de Witte	Netherlands	52.67	1

Women's Mile
Place	Athlete	Country	Time	Points
1st place, gold medalist(s)	Kate Grace	United States	4:27.20	8
2nd place, silver medalist(s)	Katie Snowden	Great Britain	4:28.04	7
3rd place, bronze medalist(s)	Helen Schlachtenhaufen	United States	4:28.13	6
4	Marta Pérez	Spain	4:28.24	5
5	Winnie Nanyondo	Uganda	4:29.08	4
6	Sarah Healy	Ireland	4:29.38	3
7	Rebecca Mehra	United States	4:30.80	2
8	Jessica Warner-Judd	Great Britain	4:31.18	1
9	Marta García	Spain	4:31.41	
10	Revée Walcott-Nolan	Great Britain	4:32.30	
11	Federica Del Buono	Italy	4:32.64	
12	Erin Wallace	Great Britain	4:35.37	
13	Britt Ummels	Netherlands	4:36.11	
	Holly Archer	Great Britain	DNS	
	Chanelle Price	United States	DNF	
	Aneta Lemiesz	Poland	DNF	

Women's 100mH (+1.5 m/s)
Place	Athlete	Country	Time	Points
1st place, gold medalist(s)	Cindy Sember	Great Britain	12.69	8
2nd place, silver medalist(s)	Payton Chadwick	United States	12.75	7
3rd place, bronze medalist(s)	Nadine Visser	Netherlands	12.78	6
4	Danielle Williams	Jamaica	12.78	5
5	Britany Anderson	Jamaica	12.81	4
6	TeJyrica Robinson	United States	13.14	3
7	Hannah Jones	Australia	13.39	2
	Alicia Barrett	Great Britain	DNF	

Women's 400mH
Place	Athlete	Country	Time	Points
1st place, gold medalist(s)	Femke Bol	Netherlands	53.24	8
2nd place, silver medalist(s)	Shamier Little	United States	54.53	7
3rd place, bronze medalist(s)	Janieve Russell	Jamaica	54.66	6
4	Jessie Knight	Great Britain	54.69	5
5	Nnenya Hailey	United States	55.16	4
6	Léa Sprunger	Switzerland	55.39	3
7	Meghan Beesley	Great Britain	57.04	2
	Ashley Spencer	United States	DNS	

Women's Pole Vault
Place	Athlete	Country	Mark	Points
1st place, gold medalist(s)	Sandi Morris	United States	4.76 m	8
2nd place, silver medalist(s)	Holly Bradshaw	Great Britain	4.71 m	7
3rd place, bronze medalist(s)	Wilma Murto	Finland	4.61 m	6
4	Nikoleta Kyriakopoulou	Greece	4.51 m	5
5	Molly Caudery	Great Britain	4.51 m	4
6	Roberta Bruni	Italy	4.36 m	3
7	Olivia Gruver	United States	4.36 m	2
8	Michaela Meijer	Sweden	4.21 m	1

Women's Long Jump
Place	Athlete	Country	Mark	Points
1st place, gold medalist(s)	Maryna Bekh-Romanchuk	Ukraine	6.67 m (+0.3 m/s) / 6.77 m (−0.1 m/s)	8
2nd place, silver medalist(s)	Malaika Mihambo	Germany	6.65 m (−0.1 m/s)	7
3rd place, bronze medalist(s)	Fátima Diame	Spain	6.46 m (−0.5 m/s) / 6.67 m (−0.7 m/s)	6
4	Jazmin Sawyers	Great Britain	6.62 m	5
5	Abigail Irozuru	Great Britain	6.60 m	4
6	Taliyah Brooks	United States	6.44 m	3
7	Sha'Keela Saunders	United States	6.24 m	2
8	Katarina Johnson-Thompson	Great Britain	6.10 m	1
	Khaddi Sagnia	Sweden	NM	

=== Promotional Events ===
Men's 400m
Place	Athlete	Country	Time
1st place, gold medalist(s)	Niclas Baker	Great Britain	46.24
2nd place, silver medalist(s)	Joe Brier	Great Britain	46.34
3rd place, bronze medalist(s)	Lee Thompson	Great Britain	46.46
4	Alex Haydock-Wilson	Great Britain	46.63
5	Michael Ohioze	Great Britain	46.91
6	Owen Smith	Great Britain	47.11
7	Martyn Rooney	Great Britain	47.74
8	Matthew Hudson-Smith	Great Britain	48.29

Men's Mile
Place	Athlete	Country	Time
1st place, gold medalist(s)	Elliot Giles	Great Britain	3:52.49
2nd place, silver medalist(s)	Jake Heyward	Great Britain	3:52.50
3rd place, bronze medalist(s)	Archie Davis	Great Britain	3:54.27
4	Jake Wightman	Great Britain	3:55.78
5	Piers Copeland	Great Britain	3:56.13
6	Joshua Lay	Great Britain	3:56.31
7	Andrew Coscoran	Ireland	3:56.89
8	Luke McCann	Ireland	3:56.93
9	Rorey Hunter	Australia	3:57.39
10	James McMurray	Great Britain	3:58.18
11	James Young	Great Britain	3:58.71
12	George Mills	Great Britain	3:58.73
13	Tiarnan Crorken	Great Britain	3:58.89
14	James West	Great Britain	3:59.05
	Erik Sowinski	United States	DNF

Men's 4 × 100 m
Place	Athlete	Country	Time
1st place, gold medalist(s)	CJ Ujah; Zharnel Hughes; Richard Kilty; Nethaneel Mitchell-Blake	Great Britain	38.27
2nd place, silver medalist(s)	Bismark Boateng; Jerome Blake; Bolade Ajomale; Andre De Grasse	Canada	38.29
3rd place, bronze medalist(s)	Joris van Gool; Taymir Burnet; Chris Garia; Churandy Martina	Netherlands	38.49
4	Felipe Bardi; Jorge Vides; Derick Silva; Paulo André de Oliveira	Brazil	38.57
5	Mike Rodgers; Emmanuel Matadi; Isiah Young; Josephus Lyles	International team	38.59
6	Jeremiah Azu; Joshua Brown; Daniel Beadsley; Sam Gordon	Great Britain	39.36
7	Solomon Bockarie; Tommy Ramdhan; Jona Efoloko; Aldrich Bailey	International team	39.43

Women's 100m (+1.5 m/s)
Place	Athlete	Country	Time
1st place, gold medalist(s)	Ajla Del Ponte	Switzerland	11.19
2nd place, silver medalist(s)	Khamica Bingham	Canada	11.23
3rd place, bronze medalist(s)	Crystal Emmanuel	Canada	11.36
4	Marije van Hunenstijn	Netherlands	11.41
5	Leonie van Vliet	Netherlands	11.62
6	Jacqueline Madogo	Canada	11.74
7	Cynthia Reinle	Switzerland	11.77

Women's 4 × 100 m
Place	Athlete	Country	Time
1st place, gold medalist(s)	Jamile Samuel; Dafne Schippers; Marije van Hunenstijn; Naomi Sedney	Netherlands	42.84
2nd place, silver medalist(s)	Asha Philip; Imani-Lara Lansiquot; Beth Dobbin; Daryll Neita	Great Britain	42.92
3rd place, bronze medalist(s)	TeJyrica Robinson; Payton Chadwick; Nnenya Hailey; Natasha Morrison	International team	43.45
4	Riccarda Dietsche; Ajla Del Ponte; Sarah Atcho; Cynthia Reinle	Switzerland	43.46
5	Hannah Brier; Amy Odunaiya; Mica Moore; Melissa Roberts	Great Britain	45.25
	Crystal Emmanuel; Leya Buchanan; Shyvonne Roxborough; Khamica Bingham	Canada	DQ

=== National Events ===
Men's 100m (+0.7 m/s)
Place	Athlete	Country	Time
1st place, gold medalist(s)	Reece Prescod	Great Britain	10.13
2nd place, silver medalist(s)	Josephus Lyles	United States	10.29
3rd place, bronze medalist(s)	Nethaneel Mitchell-Blake	Great Britain	10.31
4	Andrew Robertson	Great Britain	10.33
5	Tommy Ramdhan	Great Britain	10.40
6	Jona Efoloko	Great Britain	10.44
7	Oliver Bromby	Great Britain	10.49
	Emmanuel Matadi	Liberia	DQ

Women's 400m
Place	Athlete	Country	Time
1st place, gold medalist(s)	Emily Diamond	Great Britain	51.89
2nd place, silver medalist(s)	Zoey Clark	Great Britain	52.13
3rd place, bronze medalist(s)	Hannah Williams	Great Britain	52.98
4	Amy Hillyard	Great Britain	53.84
	Agata Zupin	Slovenia	DNS

== See also ==
- 2021 Weltklasse Zürich (Diamond League final)
