= 2022 Prefontaine Classic =

- Dates: 27-28 May 2022
- Host city: Eugene, Oregon, United States
- Venue: Hayward Field
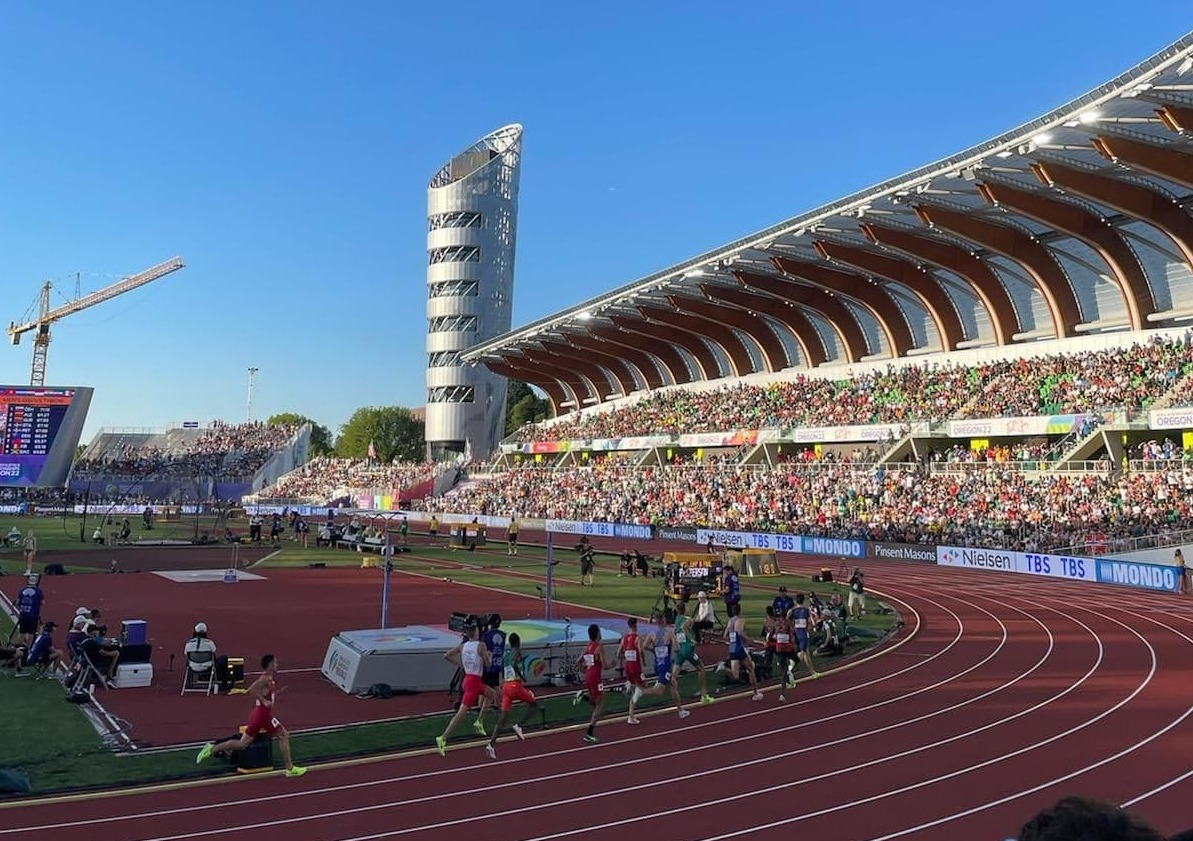
- Level: 2022 Diamond League

The 2022 Prefontaine Classic was the 47th edition of the annual outdoor track and field meeting in Eugene, Oregon, United States. Held on 27-28 May at Hayward Field, it was the third leg of the 2022 Diamond League – the highest-level international track and field circuit.

== Highlights ==
The meeting was initially highly anticipated due to announced world record attempts in the women's two miles and both the men's and women's 5000 metres. However, multiple high-level withdrawals caused concern, as Caster Semenya, Athing Mu, Matthew Centrowitz Jr., Rai Benjamin, and Sam Kendricks were all initially listed to compete but were not on the final start lists.

Though no world records were set, the meeting was highlighted Jakob Ingebrigtsen winning the Bowerman Mile, and a women's 100 m showing improvement from both Elaine Thompson-Herah and Sha'Carri Richardson on the women's side.

== Results ==
Athletes competing in the Diamond League disciplines earned extra compensation and points which went towards qualifying for the Diamond League finals in Zürich. First place earned 8 points, with each step down in place earning one less point than the previous, until no points are awarded in 9th place or lower.

=== Diamond Discipline ===
Men's Pole Vault
Place	Athlete	Country	Mark	Points
1st place, gold medalist(s)	Armand Duplantis	Sweden	5.91 m	8
2nd place, silver medalist(s)	Chris Nilsen	United States	5.81 m	7
3rd place, bronze medalist(s)	Sondre Guttormsen	Norway	5.81 m	6
4	KC Lightfoot	United States	5.71 m	5
5	Jacob Wooten	United States	5.71 m	4
6	Clayton Fritsch	United States	5.61 m	3
7	Renaud Lavillenie	France	5.41 m	2
	Valentin Lavillenie	France	NM	

Women's High Jump
Place	Athlete	Country	Mark	Points
1st place, gold medalist(s)	Yaroslava Mahuchikh	Ukraine	2.00 m	8
2nd place, silver medalist(s)	Vashti Cunningham	United States	1.93 m	7
3rd place, bronze medalist(s)	Nadezhda Dubovitskaya	Kazakhstan	1.93 m	6
4	Iryna Herashchenko	Ukraine	1.90 m	5
5	Elena Vallortigara	Italy	1.90 m	4
6	Nicola Olyslagers	Australia	1.90 m	3
7	Emily Borthwick	Great Britain	1.80 m	2
8	Yuliya Levchenko	Ukraine	1.80 m	1
	Airinė Palšytė	Lithuania	NM	

Women's Discus Throw
Place	Athlete	Country	Mark	Points
1st place, gold medalist(s)	Valarie Allman	United States	68.35 m	8
2nd place, silver medalist(s)	Sandra Perković	Croatia	65.50 m	7
3rd place, bronze medalist(s)	Kristin Pudenz	Germany	62.58 m	6
4	Liliana Cá	Portugal	61.74 m	5
5	Laulauga Tausaga	United States	61.45 m	4
6	Rachel Dincoff	United States	60.99 m	3
7	Jade Lally	Great Britain	59.76 m	2
8	Daisy Osakue	Italy	58.60 m	1

Men's 100m (−0.2 m/s)
Place	Athlete	Country	Time	Points
1st place, gold medalist(s)	Trayvon Bromell	United States	9.93	8
2nd place, silver medalist(s)	Fred Kerley	United States	9.98	7
3rd place, bronze medalist(s)	Christian Coleman	United States	10.04	6
4	Noah Lyles	United States	10.05	5
5	Letsile Tebogo	Botswana	10.12	4
6	Erriyon Knighton	United States	10.14	3
7	Kyree King	United States	10.16	2
8	Kenny Bednarek	United States	10.18	1
9	Andre De Grasse	Canada	10.21	

Men's 400m
Place	Athlete	Country	Time	Points
1st place, gold medalist(s)	Michael Norman	United States	43.60	8
2nd place, silver medalist(s)	Kirani James	Grenada	44.02	7
3rd place, bronze medalist(s)	Matthew Hudson-Smith	Great Britain	44.35	6
4	Vernon Norwood	United States	44.66	5
5	Jereem Richards	Trinidad and Tobago	44.79	4
6	Michael Cherry	United States	45.04	3
7	Isaac Makwala	Botswana	45.35	2
8	Bryce Deadmon	United States	45.35	1
9	Kahmari Montgomery	United States	46.04	

Men's Mile
Place	Athlete	Country	Time	Points
1st place, gold medalist(s)	Jakob Ingebrigtsen	Norway	3:49.76	8
2nd place, silver medalist(s)	Ollie Hoare	Australia	3:50.65	7
3rd place, bronze medalist(s)	Timothy Cheruiyot	Kenya	3:50.77	6
4	Abel Kipsang	Kenya	3:50.87	5
5	Cole Hocker	United States	3:50.97	4
6	Cooper Teare	United States	3:51.70	3
7	Jake Heyward	Great Britain	3:51.99	2
8	William Paulson	Canada	3:52.42	1
9	Charles Philibert-Thiboutot	Canada	3:53.82	
10	Ignacio Fontes	Spain	3:54.38	
11	Filip Ingebrigtsen	Norway	3:55.26	
12	Vincent Kibet Keter	Kenya	3:55.41	
13	Colin Sahlman	United States	3:56.24	
14	Clayton Murphy	United States	3:57.16	
	Erik Sowinski	United States	DNF	

Men's 5000m
Place	Athlete	Country	Time	Points
1st place, gold medalist(s)	Berihu Aregawi	Ethiopia	12:50.05	8
2nd place, silver medalist(s)	Samuel Tefera	Ethiopia	13:06.86	7
3rd place, bronze medalist(s)	Selemon Barega	Ethiopia	13:07.30	6
4	Mohammed Ahmed	Canada	13:07.85	5
5	Getnet Wale	Ethiopia	13:11.68	4
6	Matthew Ramsden	Australia	13:17.11	3
7	Brett Robinson	Australia	13:21.59	2
8	Sam Parsons	Germany	13:21.85	1
9	Geordie Beamish	New Zealand	13:29.88	
10	Richard Yator	Kenya	13:31.88	
11	Luis Grijalva	Guatemala	13:36.93	
	Paul Chelimo	United States	DNF	
	Bethwell Birgen	Kenya	DNF	
	Craig Nowak	United States	DNF	

Men's 400mH
Place	Athlete	Country	Time	Points
1st place, gold medalist(s)	Alison dos Santos	Brazil	47.23	8
2nd place, silver medalist(s)	Khallifah Rosser	United States	48.10	7
3rd place, bronze medalist(s)	Quincy Hall	United States	48.10	6
4	Carl Bengtström	Sweden	48.52	5
5	Rasmus Mägi	Estonia	48.66	4
6	CJ Allen	United States	48.76	3
7	Jaheel Hyde	Jamaica	50.38	2
8	Kemar Mowatt	Jamaica	50.81	1

Men's Shot Put
Place	Athlete	Country	Mark	Points
1st place, gold medalist(s)	Ryan Crouser	United States	23.02 m	8
2nd place, silver medalist(s)	Joe Kovacs	United States	22.49 m	7
3rd place, bronze medalist(s)	Tom Walsh	New Zealand	21.96 m	6
4	Darrell Hill	United States	21.84 m	5
5	Zane Weir	Italy	20.92 m	4
6	Nick Ponzio	Italy	20.87 m	3

Women's 100m (+0.7 m/s)
Place	Athlete	Country	Time	Points
1st place, gold medalist(s)	Elaine Thompson-Herah	Jamaica	10.79	8
2nd place, silver medalist(s)	Sha'Carri Richardson	United States	10.92	7
3rd place, bronze medalist(s)	Shericka Jackson	Jamaica	10.92	6
4	Dina Asher-Smith	Great Britain	10.98	5
5	Twanisha Terry	United States	10.98	4
6	Marie-Josée Ta Lou	Ivory Coast	11.07	3
7	Mujinga Kambundji	Switzerland	11.11	2
8	Teahna Daniels	United States	11.13	1
9	Briana Williams	Jamaica	11.20	

Women's 800m
Place	Athlete	Country	Time	Points
1st place, gold medalist(s)	Keely Hodgkinson	Great Britain	1:57.72	8
2nd place, silver medalist(s)	Ajeé Wilson	United States	1:58.06	7
3rd place, bronze medalist(s)	Raevyn Rogers	United States	1:58.44	6
4	Natoya Goule	Jamaica	1:59.39	5
5	Sage Hurta	United States	1:59.59	4
6	Halimah Nakaayi	Uganda	1:59.94	3
7	Allie Wilson	United States	2:00.15	2
8	Jemma Reekie	Great Britain	2:00.53	1
9	Michaela Meyer	United States	2:01.31	
	Kendra Chambers	United States	DNF	

Women's 1500m
Place	Athlete	Country	Time	Points
1st place, gold medalist(s)	Faith Kipyegon	Kenya	3:52.59	8
2nd place, silver medalist(s)	Gudaf Tsegay	Ethiopia	3:54.21	7
3rd place, bronze medalist(s)	Gabriela DeBues-Stafford	Canada	3:58.62	6
4	Sinclaire Johnson	United States	3:58.85	5
5	Jessica Hull	Australia	3:59.31	4
6	Elle Purrier St. Pierre	United States	3:59.68	3
7	Freweyni Hailu	Ethiopia	3:59.97	2
8	Winnie Nanyondo	Uganda	4:00.25	1
9	Cory McGee	United States	4:00.34	
10	Gaia Sabbatini	Italy	4:01.93	
11	Laura Muir	Great Britain	4:04.45	
12	Aurore Fleury	France	4:05.80	
13	Josette Andrews	United States	4:06.13	
14	Tigist Ketema	Ethiopia	4:06.59	
15	Nozomi Tanaka	Japan	4:07.43	
	Angel Piccirillo	United States	DNF	
	Shannon Osika	United States	DNF	

Women's 3000mSC
Place	Athlete	Country	Time	Points
1st place, gold medalist(s)	Norah Jeruto	Kazakhstan	8:57.97	8
2nd place, silver medalist(s)	Winfred Yavi	Bahrain	8:58.71	7
3rd place, bronze medalist(s)	Mekides Abebe	Ethiopia	9:03.26	6
4	Peruth Chemutai	Uganda	9:05.54	5
5	Werkuha Getachew	Ethiopia	9:07.81	4
6	Celliphine Chespol	Kenya	9:10.17	3
7	Jackline Chepkoech	Kenya	9:15.97	2
8	Emma Coburn	United States	9:18.19	1
9	Courtney Frerichs	United States	9:20.96	
10	Katie Rainsberger	United States	9:32.13	
	Rosefline Chepngetich	Kenya	DNF	

Women's Long Jump
Place	Athlete	Country	Mark	Points
1st place, gold medalist(s)	Khaddi Sagnia	Sweden	6.95 m (+1.0 m/s)	8
2nd place, silver medalist(s)	Ese Brume	Nigeria	6.82 m (+1.9 m/s)	7
3rd place, bronze medalist(s)	Tara Davis-Woodhall	United States	6.73 m (+1.7 m/s)	6
4	Quanesha Burks	United States	6.70 m (+2.3 m/s)	5
5	Ivana Španović	Serbia	6.40 m (−0.1 m/s)	4
6	Rhesa Foster	United States	6.16 m (+0.5 m/s)	3
—	Lorraine Ugen	Great Britain	NM	
Best wind-legal performances
—	Quanesha Burks	United States	6.66 m (+0.3 m/s)	

=== Promotional Events ===
Men's 5000m
Place	Athlete	Country	Time
1st place, gold medalist(s)	Joshua Cheptegei	Uganda	12:57.99
2nd place, silver medalist(s)	Milkesa Mengesha	Ethiopia	13:01.11
3rd place, bronze medalist(s)	Daniel Ebenyo	Kenya	13:10.61
4	Nibret Melak	Ethiopia	13:12.88
5	Sam Atkin	Great Britain	13:15.31
6	Zouhair Talbi	Morocco	13:24.21
7	Edward Cheserek	Kenya	13:25.19
8	Abdessamad Oukhelfen	Spain	13:25.33
9	Mark Lomuket	Kenya	13:25.82
10	Mason Ferlic	United States	13:48.79
	Thiago André	Brazil	DNF
	Hassan Mead	United States	DNF
	Craig Nowak	United States	DNF
	James West	Great Britain	DNF

Women's 2 Miles
Place	Athlete	Country	Time
1st place, gold medalist(s)	Francine Niyonsaba	Burundi	8:59.08
2nd place, silver medalist(s)	Beatrice Chebet	Kenya	9:14.71
3rd place, bronze medalist(s)	Laura Galván	Mexico	9:15.74
4	Konstanze Klosterhalfen	Germany	9:16.73
5	Helen Schlachtenhaufen	United States	9:17.62
6	Elly Henes	United States	9:18.73
7	Edinah Jebitok	Kenya	9:19.01
8	Eleanor Fulton	United States	9:20.17
9	Whittni Morgan	United States	9:20.19
10	Dani Jones	United States	9:35.67
11	Ella Donaghu	United States	9:40.44
12	Taryn Rawlings	United States	9:41.11
	Rebecca Mehra	United States	DNF
	Susan Lokayo Ejore	Kenya	DNF
	Winny Chebet	Kenya	DNF
	Anna Camp Bennett	United States	DNF

Women's 5000m
Place	Athlete	Country	Time
1st place, gold medalist(s)	Ejgayehu Taye	Ethiopia	14:12.98
2nd place, silver medalist(s)	Letesenbet Gidey	Ethiopia	14:24.59
3rd place, bronze medalist(s)	Rahel Daniel	Eritrea	14:36.66
4	Lemlem Hailu	Ethiopia	14:44.73
5	Teresia Muthoni Gateri	Kenya	14:44.89
6	Fantu Worku	Ethiopia	14:47.37
7	Daisy Jepkemei	Kazakhstan	14:52.64
8	Caroline Chepkoech Kipkirui	Kazakhstan	15:05.68
9	Rebecca Mwangi	Kenya	15:35.98
	Bontu Rebitu	Bahrain	DNF

Women's 200m (+0.8 m/s)
Place	Athlete	Country	Time
1st place, gold medalist(s)	Shelly-Ann Fraser-Pryce	Jamaica	22.41
2nd place, silver medalist(s)	Brittany Brown	United States	22.74
3rd place, bronze medalist(s)	Anthonique Strachan	Bahamas	22.76
4	Jenna Prandini	United States	22.77
5	Tamara Clark	United States	22.77
6	Cambrea Sturgis	United States	22.85
7	Mujinga Kambundji	Switzerland	22.88
8	Dezerea Bryant	United States	22.91
9	Shawnti Jackson	United States	23.28

Women's 100mH (−0.7 m/s)
Place	Athlete	Country	Time
1st place, gold medalist(s)	Jasmine Camacho-Quinn	Puerto Rico	12.45
2nd place, silver medalist(s)	Tobi Amusan	Nigeria	12.58
3rd place, bronze medalist(s)	Tonea Marshall	United States	12.66
4	Cindy Sember	Great Britain	12.69
5	Danielle Williams	Jamaica	12.71
6	Gabbi Cunningham	United States	12.75
7	Nia Ali	United States	12.77
8	Kendra Harrison	United States	12.78
9	Anna Cockrell	United States	12.84

Men's 1500m
Place	Athlete	Country	Time
1st place, gold medalist(s)	Sam Tanner	New Zealand	3:34.37
2nd place, silver medalist(s)	Neil Gourley	Great Britain	3:34.85
3rd place, bronze medalist(s)	Vincent Ciattei	United States	3:35.07
4	Sam Prakel	United States	3:36.43
5	Hobbs Kessler	United States	3:36.63
6	Luke McCann	Ireland	3:36.93
7	Colby Alexander	United States	3:37.15
8	Charlie Hunter	Australia	3:37.33
9	Marc Scott	Great Britain	3:37.68
10	James West	Great Britain	3:38.44
11	Christian Noble	United States	3:38.95
12	Thomas Ratcliffe	United States	3:40.43
13	Jonas Raess	Switzerland	3:42.56
14	Caleb Lakeman	United States	3:55.20
	Robby Andrews	United States	DNF
