= 2021 British Grand Prix (athletics) =

- Dates: 23 May 2021
- Host city: Gateshead, England
- Venue: Gateshead International Stadium
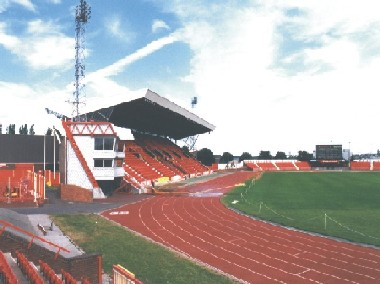
- Level: 2021 Diamond League
- Events: 19 (14 Diamond League)

The 2021 British Grand Prix, officially the 2021 Müller Grand Prix Gateshead because of title sponsor Müller, was the 2021 edition of the annual outdoor track and field meeting in Gateshead, England. Held on 23 May at the Gateshead International Stadium, it was the first leg of the 2021 Diamond League – the highest level international track and field circuit. It was the first time the meeting was held in Gateshead instead of Birmingham since 2010, replacing the Rabat Diamond League which was cancelled because of the COVID-19 pandemic.

In addition to 14 Diamond League disciplines (7 men and 7 women), the first hour of competition included 100 metres and 200 metres sprint para-athletics events for both sexes, and a women's 400 metres hurdles event. Olympic champions, world champions, and world record holders had been announced to compete including Shelly-Ann Fraser-Pryce, Dina Asher-Smith, and Sha'Carri Richardson in the women's 100 metres.

== Diamond League results ==
Athletes competing in the Diamond League disciplines earned extra compensation and points which went towards qualifying for the 2021 Diamond League final, held at the 2021 Weltklasse Zürich from 8–9 September. First place earned eight points, with each step down in place earning one less point than the previous, until no points were awarded in ninth place or lower.

The top-3 athletes in throwing and horizontal jumping events are ranked by the "Final 3" format, with their best mark overall in italics if it differs from their final trial.

=== Men ===
200 m (−3.0 m/s)
Place	Athlete	Time	Points
1st place, gold medalist(s)	Kenny Bednarek (USA)	20.33	8
2nd place, silver medalist(s)	Aaron Brown (CAN)	20.79	7
3rd place, bronze medalist(s)	Andre De Grasse (CAN)	20.85	6
4	Vernon Norwood (USA)	20.95	5
5	Emmanuel Matadi (LBR)	21.13	4
6	Adam Gemili (GBR)	21.18	3
7	Julian Forte (JAM)	21.47	2
8	Tommy Ramdhan (GBR)	21.61	1

1500 m
Place	Athlete	Time	Points
1st place, gold medalist(s)	Jakob Ingebrigtsen (NOR)	3:36.27	8
2nd place, silver medalist(s)	Oliver Hoare (AUS)	3:36.58	7
3rd place, bronze medalist(s)	Stewart McSweyn (AUS)	3:37.32	6
4	Ignacio Fontes (ESP)	3:37.97	5
5	Matthew Ramsden (AUS)	3:37.98	4
6	Archie Davis (GBR)	3:41.66	3
7	George Mills (GBR)	3:42.70	2
8	Musab Adam Ali (QAT)	3:43.80	1
9	Ryan Gregson (AUS)	3:45.36	
10	Thomas Keen (GBR)	3:45.97	
11	Andreas Lindgreen (DEN)	3:51.46	
12	Brimin Kiprono Kiprotich (KEN)	3:52.63	
13	Saúl Ordóñez (ESP)	3:54.16	
	Erik Sowinski (USA)	DNF	
	Kalle Berglund (SWE)	DNF	

5000 m
Place	Athlete	Time	Points
1st place, gold medalist(s)	Mohamed Katir (ESP)	13:08.52 PB	8
2nd place, silver medalist(s)	Nicholas Kimeli (KEN)	13:10.11	7
3rd place, bronze medalist(s)	Michael Kibet (KEN)	13:20.52	6
4	Morgan McDonald (AUS)	13:22.78	5
5	Jonas Raess (SUI)	13:22.92	4
6	Andrew Butchart (GBR)	13:23.73	3
7	Jacob Krop (KEN)	13:24.64	2
8	Jimmy Gressier (FRA)	13:25.36	1
9	Robin Hendrix (BEL)	13:25.68	
10	Henrik Ingebrigtsen (NOR)	13:27.07	
11	Mike Foppen (NED)	13:27.33	
12	Séan Tobin (IRL)	13:33.93	
13	Jack Rowe (GBR)	13:35.77	
14	Jake Smith (GBR)	13:38.01	
15	David McNeill (AUS)	13:54.13	
16	Jonathan Davies (GBR)	14:17.75	
	Adam Clarke (GBR)	DNF	
	Ouassim Oumaiz (ESP)	DNF	
	Adel Mechaal (ESP)	DNF	

3000 m steeplechase
Place	Athlete	Time	Points
1st place, gold medalist(s)	Hillary Bor (USA)	8:30.20	8
2nd place, silver medalist(s)	Leonard Bett (KEN)	8:31.52	7
3rd place, bronze medalist(s)	Djilali Bedrani (FRA)	8:32.04	6
4	Mark Pearce (GBR)	8:32.65 PB	5
5	Daniel Arce (ESP)	8:33.00	4
6	Ole Hesselbjerg (DEN)	8:34.70	3
7	Abraham Kibiwott (KEN)	8:35.14	2
8	Phil Norman (GBR)	8:35.31	1
9	Topi Raitanen (FIN)	8:35.82	
10	James Nipperess (AUS)	8:36.83	
11	Matthew Hughes (CAN)	8:38.11	
12	Zak Seddon (GBR)	8:38.39	
	Ben Buckingham (AUS)	DNF	
	Stanley Kebenei (USA)	DNF	

Pole vault
Place	Athlete	Mark	Points
1st place, gold medalist(s)	Sam Kendricks (USA)	5.74 m	8
2nd place, silver medalist(s)	Armand Duplantis (SWE)	5.55 m	7
3rd place, bronze medalist(s)	Harry Coppell (GBR)	5.45 m	6
4	Cole Walsh (USA)	5.30 m	5
5	Ben Broeders (BEL)	5.30 m	4
NM	Charlie Myers (GBR)	No mark	0
NM	Valentin Lavillenie (FRA)	No mark	0

Long jump
Place	Athlete	Mark	Points
1st place, gold medalist(s)	Filippo Randazzo (ITA)	8.11 m (+2.8 m/s)	8
2nd place, silver medalist(s)	Eusebio Cáceres (ESP)	8.04 m (+1.4 m/s)	7
3rd place, bronze medalist(s)	Tajay Gayle (JAM)	7.91 m (+1.1 m/s) / 8.00 m (+2.0 m/s)	6
4	Radek Juška (CZE)	7.93 m (+2.7 m/s)	5
5	Thobias Montler (SWE)	7.85 m (+2.4 m/s)	4
6	Kristian Pulli (FIN)	7.85 m (+2.2 m/s)	3
7	Reynold Banigo (GBR)	7.72 m (+2.0 m/s)	2
8	Henry Frayne (AUS)	7.70 m (+2.1 m/s)	1
9	Alexander Farquharson (GBR)	7.61 m (+2.0 m/s)	
Best wind-legal performances
	Filippo Randazzo (ITA)	7.99 m (+1.9 m/s)	
	Radek Juška (CZE)	7.83 m (+1.9 m/s)	
	Thobias Montler (SWE)	7.78 m (+2.0 m/s)	

Javelin throw
Place	Athlete	Mark	Points
1st place, gold medalist(s)	Marcin Krukowski (POL)	81.18 m / 82.61 m	8
2nd place, silver medalist(s)	Keshorn Walcott (TTO)	73.31 m / 77.78 m	7
3rd place, bronze medalist(s)	Kim Amb (SWE)	No mark / 76.96 m	6
4	Anderson Peters (GRN)	75.65 m	5
5	Gatis Čakšs (LAT)	75.01 m	4
6	Norbert Rivasz-Tóth (HUN)	73.20 m	3
7	Harry Hughes (GBR)	71.23 m	2
DNS	Jakub Vadlejch (CZE)	Did not start	

=== Women ===
100 m (−3.1 m/s)
Place	Athlete	Time	Points
1st place, gold medalist(s)	Dina Asher-Smith (GBR)	11.35	8
2nd place, silver medalist(s)	Sha'Carri Richardson (USA)	11.44	7
3rd place, bronze medalist(s)	Marie-Josée Ta Lou (CIV)	11.48	6
4	Shelly-Ann Fraser-Pryce (JAM)	11.51	5
5	Blessing Okagbare (NGR)	11.57	4
6	Javianne Oliver (USA)	11.58	3
7	Natasha Morrison (JAM)	11.77	2
8	Ajla Del Ponte (SUI)	11.81	1

400 m
Place	Athlete	Time	Points
1st place, gold medalist(s)	Kendall Ellis (USA)	51.86	8
2nd place, silver medalist(s)	Stephenie Ann McPherson (JAM)	51.96	7
3rd place, bronze medalist(s)	Lieke Klaver (NED)	52.03	6
4	Kaylin Whitney (USA)	52.84	5
5	Hannah Williams (GBR)	53.35	4
6	Shericka Jackson (JAM)	53.40	3
7	Lisanne de Witte (NED)	53.42	2
8	Laviai Nielsen (GBR)	53.96	1

1500 m
Place	Athlete	Time	Points
1st place, gold medalist(s)	Laura Muir (GBR)	4:03.73	8
2nd place, silver medalist(s)	Rababe Arafi (MAR)	4:07.73	7
3rd place, bronze medalist(s)	Katie Snowden (GBR)	4:08.92	6
4	Sarah Healy (IRL)	4:09.92	5
5	Gaia Sabbatini (ITA)	4:10.21	4
6	Eilish McColgan (GBR)	4:10.48	3
7	Winnie Nanyondo (UGA)	4:10.50	2
8	Adelle Tracey (GBR)	4:10.93	1
9	Marta Pérez (ESP)	4:11.51	
10	Elise Vanderelst (BEL)	4:14.03	
11	Esther Guerrero (ESP)	4:14.55	
12	Axumawit Embaye (ETH)	4:15.23	
13	Claudia Bobocea (ROU)	4:17.08	
	Erin Wallace (GBR)	DNF	

100 m hurdles (−3.9 m/s)
Place	Athlete	Time	Points
1st place, gold medalist(s)	Cindy Sember (GBR)	13.28	8
2nd place, silver medalist(s)	Luca Kozák (HUN)	13.37	7
3rd place, bronze medalist(s)	Luminosa Bogliolo (ITA)	13.45	6
4	Tiffany Porter (GBR)	13.50	5
5	Megan Tapper (JAM)	13.53	4
6	Zoë Sedney (NED)	13.57	3
7	Pedrya Seymour (BAH)	13.57	2
8	Laura Valette (FRA)	13.59	1

High jump
Place	Athlete	Mark	Points
1st place, gold medalist(s)	Kamila Lićwinko (POL)	1.91 m	8
2nd place, silver medalist(s)	Emily Borthwick (GBR)	1.91 m PB	7
3rd place, bronze medalist(s)	Morgan Lake (GBR)	1.88 m	6
4	Mariya Lasitskene (RUS)	1.88 m	5
5	Alessia Trost (ITA)	1.88 m	4
6	Nikki Manson (GBR)	1.84 m	3
6	Levern Spencer (LCA)	1.84 m	3
8	Ana Šimić (CRO)	1.84 m	1
9	Yuliya Levchenko (UKR)	1.84 m	
10	Bethan Partridge (GBR)	1.80 m	
DNS	Yaroslava Mahuchikh (UKR)	Did not start	

Triple jump
Place	Athlete	Mark	Points
1st place, gold medalist(s)	Shanieka Ricketts (JAM)	14.29 m (+3.1 m/s) / 14.40 m (+1.3 m/s)	8
2nd place, silver medalist(s)	Patrícia Mamona (POR)	13.62 m (+1.9 m/s) / 14.37 m (+3.1 m/s)	7
3rd place, bronze medalist(s)	Naomi Ogbeta (GBR)	13.32 m (+1.3 m/s) / 14.29 m (+2.2 m/s)	6
4	Kimberly Williams (JAM)	14.15 m (+1.8 m/s)	5
5	Keturah Orji (USA)	13.96 m (+2.6 m/s)	4
6	Paraskevi Papachristou (GRE)	13.62 m (+2.0 m/s)	3
7	Dovilė Kilty (LTU)	12.96 m (+2.1 m/s)	2
DNS	Olha Saladukha (UKR)	Did not start	
Best wind-legal performances
	Keturah Orji (USA)	13.76 m (+0.7 m/s)	
	Naomi Ogbeta (GBR)	13.53 m (+1.6 m/s)	
	Dovilė Kilty (LTU)	12.93 m (+1.9 m/s)	

Shot put
Place	Athlete	Mark	Points
1st place, gold medalist(s)	Auriol Dongmo (POR)	18.16 m / 19.08 m	8
2nd place, silver medalist(s)	Danniel Thomas-Dodd (JAM)	18.12 m / 18.46 m	7
3rd place, bronze medalist(s)	Maggie Ewen (USA)	16.96 m / 18.54 m	6
4	Sophie McKinna (GBR)	18.36 m	5
5	Fanny Roos (SWE)	18.33 m	4
6	Chase Ealey (USA)	18.12 m	3
7	Amelia Strickler (GBR)	17.90 m PB	2
8	Christina Schwanitz (GER)	17.86 m	1

== Other results ==
Event	First		Second		Third	
Women's 400 m hurdles	Sara Petersen (DEN)	56.32	Jessica Turner (GBR)	56.56	Janieve Russell (JAM)	57.16
Women's T20/35/38/64 100 m	Sophie Hahn (GBR)	13.31	Esme O'Connell (GBR)	13.82	Faye Olszowka (GBR)	13.96
Women's T11/38/44 200 m	Ali Smith (GBR)	28.86	Libby Clegg (GBR)	30.07	Victoria Baskett (GBR)	30.28
Men's T12/37/38/46/47/64 100 m	Thomas Young (GBR)	11.71	Zac Shaw (GBR)	11.82	Ola Abidogun (GBR)	11.87
Men's T20/38/47/61 200 m	Columba Blango (GBR)	23.19	Ethan Kirby (GBR)	24.00	Shaun Burrows (GBR)	24.37

== See also ==
- 2021 Weltklasse Zürich (2021 Diamond League final)
