= 2021 Bauhausgalan =

- Dates: 4 July 2021
- Host city: Stockholm, Sweden
- Venue: Stockholm Olympic Stadium
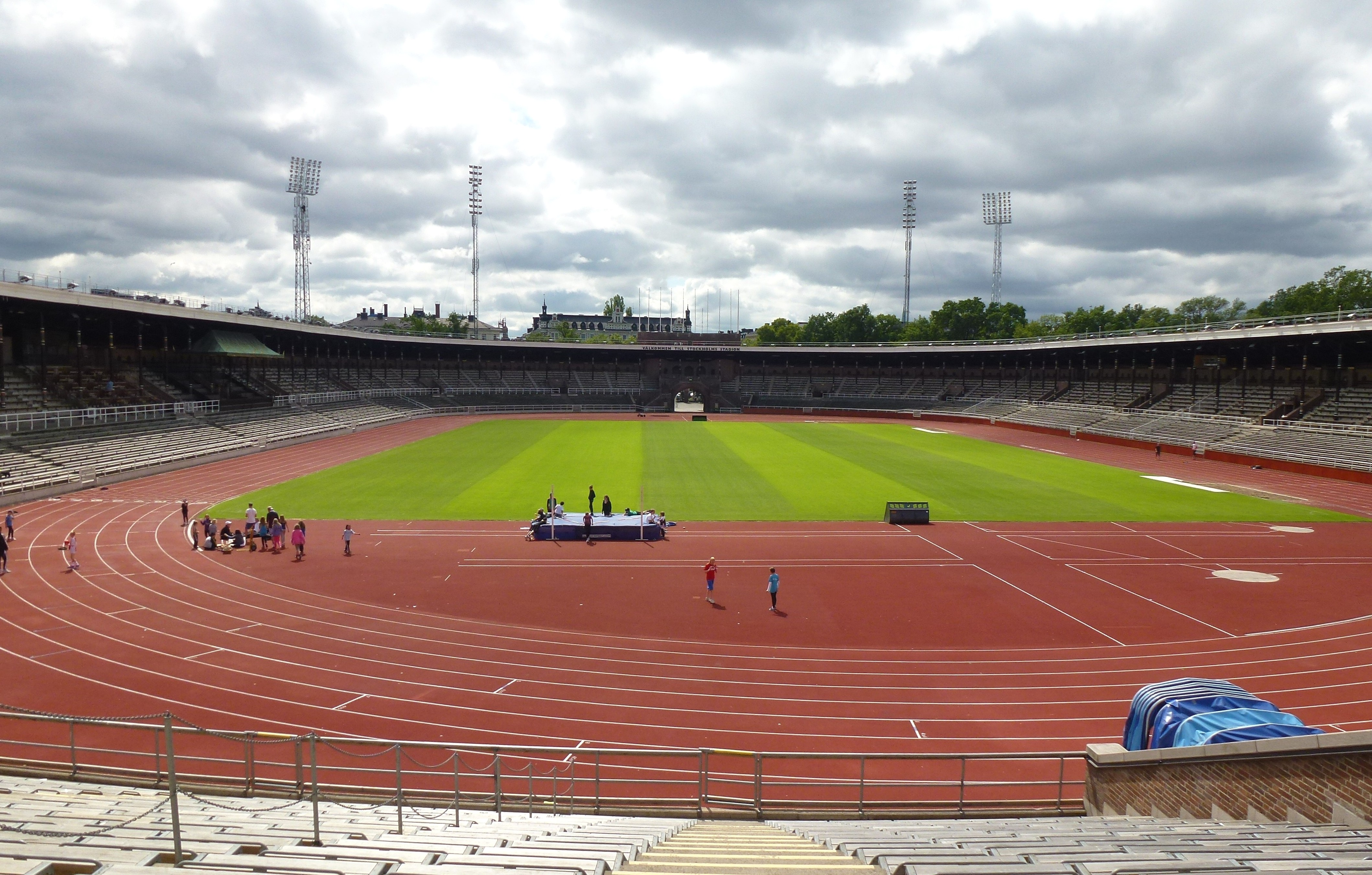
- Level: 2021 Diamond League

The 2021 Bauhausgalan was the 55th edition of the annual outdoor track and field meeting in Stockholm, Sweden. Held on 4 July at Stockholm Olympic Stadium, it was the fifth leg of the 2021 Diamond League – the highest level international track and field circuit.

The meeting was highlighted by the women's 400 m hurdles, where Femke Bol and Shamier Little ran the #4 and #5 performances of all time in a close finish.

== Results ==
Athletes competing in the Diamond League disciplines earned extra compensation and points which went towards qualifying the Diamond League finals in Zürich. First place earned eight points, with each step down in place earning one less point than the previous, until no points are awarded in ninth place or lower.

The top-3 athletes in throwing and horizontal jumping events are ranked by the "Final 3" format, with their best mark overall in italics if it differs from their final trial.

=== Diamond Discipline ===
Men's 100m (−0.8 m/s)
Place	Athlete	Country	Time	Points
1st place, gold medalist(s)	Ronnie Baker	United States	10.03	8
2nd place, silver medalist(s)	Marcell Jacobs	Italy	10.05	7
3rd place, bronze medalist(s)	CJ Ujah	Great Britain	10.10	6
4	Isiah Young	United States	10.13	5
5	Aaron Brown	Canada	10.18	4
6	Jerome Blake	Canada	10.18	3
7	Marvin Bracy	United States	10.19	2
8	Henrik Larsson	Sweden	10.39	1

Men's 400m
Place	Athlete	Country	Time	Points
1st place, gold medalist(s)	Kirani James	Grenada	44.63	8
2nd place, silver medalist(s)	Deon Lendore	Trinidad and Tobago	44.73	7
3rd place, bronze medalist(s)	Liemarvin Bonevacia	Netherlands	44.80	6
4	Vernon Norwood	United States	44.83	5
5	Wilbert London	United States	44.86	4
6	Isaac Makwala	Botswana	45.03	3
7	Alexander Ogando	Dominican Republic	46.87	2
8	Emil Johansson	Sweden	47.36	1

Men's 800m
Place	Athlete	Country	Time	Points
1st place, gold medalist(s)	Ferguson Rotich	Kenya	1:43.84	8
2nd place, silver medalist(s)	Marco Arop	Canada	1:44.00	7
3rd place, bronze medalist(s)	Elliot Giles	Great Britain	1:44.05	6
4	Adrián Ben	Spain	1:44.18	5
5	Isaiah Harris	United States	1:44.51	4
6	Amel Tuka	Bosnia and Herzegovina	1:44.94	3
7	Andreas Kramer	Sweden	1:45.05	2
8	Jamie Webb	Great Britain	1:55.31	1
	Patryk Sieradzki	Poland	DNF	

Men's 1500m
Place	Athlete	Country	Time	Points
1st place, gold medalist(s)	Timothy Cheruiyot	Kenya	3:32.30	8
2nd place, silver medalist(s)	Ignacio Fontes	Spain	3:33.27	7
3rd place, bronze medalist(s)	Ronald Kwemoi	Kenya	3:33.53	6
4	Ronald Musagala	Uganda	3:33.99	5
5	Musab Adam Ali	Qatar	3:34.76	4
6	Bethwell Birgen	Kenya	3:34.77	3
7	Brahim Kaazouzi	Morocco	3:35.32	2
8	Josh Thompson	United States	3:37.23	1
9	Abdirahman Saeed Hassan	Qatar	3:38.67	
10	Emil Danielsson	Sweden	3:39.70	
	Kalle Berglund	Sweden	DNF	
	Žan Rudolf	Slovenia	DNF	
	Timothy Sein	Kenya	DNF	

Men's 400mH
Place	Athlete	Country	Time	Points
1st place, gold medalist(s)	Alison dos Santos	Brazil	47.34	8
2nd place, silver medalist(s)	Yasmani Copello	Turkey	48.19	7
3rd place, bronze medalist(s)	Kemar Mowatt	Jamaica	48.75	6
4	Rasmus Mägi	Estonia	48.81	5
5	Chris McAlister	Great Britain	49.16	4
6	Wilfried Happio	France	49.28	3
7	Amere Lattin	United States	49.87	2
	Kyron McMaster	British Virgin Islands	DNF	

Men's Pole Vault
Place	Athlete	Country	Mark	Points
1st place, gold medalist(s)	Armand Duplantis	Sweden	6.02 m	8
2nd place, silver medalist(s)	Sam Kendricks	United States	5.92 m	7
3rd place, bronze medalist(s)	Renaud Lavillenie	France	5.92 m	6
4	EJ Obiena	Philippines	5.82 m	5
5	Piotr Lisek	Poland	5.82 m	4
6	Chris Nilsen	United States	5.72 m	3
7	KC Lightfoot	United States	5.62 m	2
8	Melker Svärd Jacobsson	Sweden	5.52 m	1

Men's Long Jump
Place	Athlete	Country	Mark	Points
1st place, gold medalist(s)	Tajay Gayle	Jamaica	8.55 m (+2.3 m/s)	8
2nd place, silver medalist(s)	Juan Miguel Echevarría	Cuba	8.19 m (+0.9 m/s) / 8.29 m (+1.5 m/s)	7
3rd place, bronze medalist(s)	Thobias Montler	Sweden	NM / 8.23 m (+1.4 m/s)	6
4	Ruswahl Samaai	South Africa	8.01 m (+2.3 m/s)	5
5	Benjamin Gföhler	Switzerland	7.80 m (+0.3 m/s)	4
6	Serhiy Nykyforov	Ukraine	7.76 m (+1.4 m/s)	3
7	Lester Lescay	Cuba	7.61 m (−3.1 m/s)	2
8	Andrzej Kuch	Poland	7.57 m (+0.8 m/s)	1
Best wind-legal performances
—	Tajay Gayle	Jamaica	8.27 m (−2.0 m/s)	
—	Ruswahl Samaai	South Africa	7.94 m (+0.7 m/s)	

Men's Discus Throw
Place	Athlete	Country	Mark	Points
1st place, gold medalist(s)	Daniel Ståhl	Sweden	68.23 m / 68.64 m	8
2nd place, silver medalist(s)	Kristjan Čeh	Slovenia	64.74 m / 66.62 m	7
3rd place, bronze medalist(s)	Andrius Gudžius	Lithuania	63.43 m / 66.97 m	6
4	Simon Pettersson	Sweden	65.19 m	5
5	Daniel Jasinski	Germany	64.70 m	4
6	Alex Rose	Samoa	64.30 m	3
7	Fedrick Dacres	Jamaica	63.57 m	2
8	Lukas Weißhaidinger	Austria	62.59 m	1

Women's 200m (−0.4 m/s)
Place	Athlete	Country	Time	Points
1st place, gold medalist(s)	Shericka Jackson	Jamaica	22.10	8
2nd place, silver medalist(s)	Marie-Josée Ta Lou	Ivory Coast	22.36	7
3rd place, bronze medalist(s)	Beatrice Masilingi	Namibia	22.65	6
4	Beth Dobbin	Great Britain	22.84	5
5	Morolake Akinosun	United States	22.97	4
6	Marije van Hunenstijn	Netherlands	23.28	3
7	Lisa Lilja	Sweden	23.39	2
8	Moa Hjelmer	Sweden	23.48	1

Women's 800m
Place	Athlete	Country	Time	Points
1st place, gold medalist(s)	Rose Mary Almanza	Cuba	1:56.28	8
2nd place, silver medalist(s)	Natoya Goule	Jamaica	1:56.44	7
3rd place, bronze medalist(s)	Kate Grace	United States	1:57.36	6
4	Keely Hodgkinson	Great Britain	1:57.51	5
5	Catriona Bisset	Australia	1:59.13	4
6	Lovisa Lindh	Sweden	1:59.76	3
7	Hedda Hynne	Norway	1:59.82	2
8	Worknesh Mesele	Ethiopia	2:02.07	1
	Aneta Lemiesz	Poland	DNF	

Women's 400mH
Place	Athlete	Country	Time	Points
1st place, gold medalist(s)	Femke Bol	Netherlands	52.37	8
2nd place, silver medalist(s)	Shamier Little	United States	52.39	7
3rd place, bronze medalist(s)	Anna Ryzhykova	Ukraine	52.96	6
4	Janieve Russell	Jamaica	54.08	5
5	Viktoriya Tkachuk	Ukraine	54.39	4
6	Leah Nugent	Jamaica	55.01	3
7	Carolina Krafzik	Germany	55.20	2
8	Léa Sprunger	Switzerland	55.27	1

Women's 3000mSC
Place	Athlete	Country	Time	Points
1st place, gold medalist(s)	Hyvin Jepkemoi	Kenya	9:04.34	8
2nd place, silver medalist(s)	Gesa Felicitas Krause	Germany	9:09.13	7
3rd place, bronze medalist(s)	Beatrice Chepkoech	Kenya	9:10.52	6
4	Purity Cherotich Kirui	Kenya	9:16.91	5
5	Leah Falland	United States	9:16.96	4
6	Rosefline Chepngetich	Kenya	9:22.30	3
7	Genevieve Gregson	Australia	9:23.24	2
8	Elena Burkard	Germany	9:27.81	1
9	Mel Lawrence	United States	9:30.26	
10	Aimee Pratt	Great Britain	9:39.12	
11	Agrie Belachew	Ethiopia	9:45.17	
12	Caroline Högardh	Sweden	10:18.71	
	Fancy Cherono	Kenya	DNF	

Women's High Jump
Place	Athlete	Country	Mark	Points
1st place, gold medalist(s)	Yaroslava Mahuchikh	Ukraine	2.03 m	8
2nd place, silver medalist(s)	Nicola Olyslagers	Australia	2.01 m	7
3rd place, bronze medalist(s)	Eleanor Patterson	Australia	1.96 m	6
4	Iryna Herashchenko	Ukraine	1.96 m	5
5	Salome Lang	Switzerland	1.93 m	4
6	Kamila Lićwinko	Poland	1.93 m	3
7	Karyna Demidik	Belarus	1.93 m	2
8	Erika Kinsey	Sweden	1.89 m	1

Women's Long Jump
Place	Athlete	Country	Mark	Points
1st place, gold medalist(s)	Ivana Vuleta	Serbia	6.88 m (−2.4 m/s)	8
2nd place, silver medalist(s)	Malaika Mihambo	Germany	6.77 m (−0.2 m/s) / 7.02 m (+2.6 m/s)	7
3rd place, bronze medalist(s)	Maryna Bekh-Romanchuk	Ukraine	NM / 6.79 m (+1.0 m/s)	6
4	Khaddi Sagnia	Sweden	6.72 m (−0.4 m/s)	5
5	Jazmin Sawyers	Great Britain	6.57 m (+2.9 m/s)	4
6	Polina Lukyanenkova	Authorised Neutral Athletes	6.55 m (+2.0 m/s)	3
7	Sha'Keela Saunders	United States	6.34 m (+3.5 m/s)	2
Best wind-legal performances
—	Jazmin Sawyers	Great Britain	6.50 m (+0.1 m/s)	
—	Sha'Keela Saunders	United States	6.12 m (+0.7 m/s)	

Women's Shot Put
Place	Athlete	Country	Mark	Points
1st place, gold medalist(s)	Valerie Adams	New Zealand	18.65 m / 19.26 m	8
2nd place, silver medalist(s)	Auriol Dongmo	Portugal	18.37 m / 19.05 m	7
3rd place, bronze medalist(s)	Maggie Ewen	United States	18.25 m / 19.04 m	6
4	Aliona Dubitskaya	Belarus	19.03 m	5
5	Fanny Roos	Sweden	18.96 m	4
6	Chase Jackson	United States	18.65 m	3
7	Danniel Thomas-Dodd	Jamaica	18.59 m	2
8	Christina Schwanitz	Germany	18.59 m	1

=== Promotional Events ===
Women's Pole Vault
Place	Athlete	Country	Mark
1st place, gold medalist(s)	Polina Knoroz	Authorised Neutral Athletes	4.71 m
2nd place, silver medalist(s)	Holly Bradshaw	Great Britain	4.61 m
3rd place, bronze medalist(s)	Iryna Zhuk	Belarus	4.61 m
4	Angelica Bengtsson	Sweden	4.61 m
5	Angelica Moser	Switzerland	4.61 m
6	Michaela Meijer	Sweden	4.51 m
7	Olivia Gruver	United States	4.36 m
8	Lisa Gunnarsson	Sweden	4.21 m

=== National Events ===
Men's 100m (+0.5 m/s)
Place	Athlete	Country	Time
1st place, gold medalist(s)	Jerome Blake	Canada	10.15
2nd place, silver medalist(s)	Mouhamadou Fall	France	10.16
3rd place, bronze medalist(s)	Ebrahima Camara	Gambia	10.31
4	Sean Safo-Antwi	Ghana	10.39
5	Thomas Jones	Sweden	10.46
6	Desmond Rogo	Sweden	10.54
7	Viktor Thor	Sweden	10.65
8	Odain Rose	Sweden	10.66

Men's 800m
Place	Athlete	Country	Time
1st place, gold medalist(s)	Jonathan Kitilit	Kenya	1:44.68
2nd place, silver medalist(s)	Archie Davis	Great Britain	1:44.72
3rd place, bronze medalist(s)	Piers Copeland	Great Britain	1:45.77
4	Luke McCann	Ireland	1:46.36
5	Jake Heyward	Great Britain	1:46.47
6	Joakim Andersson	Sweden	1:46.51
7	John Fitzsimons	Ireland	1:46.54
8	Alexander Lundskog	Sweden	1:47.71
9	Johan Rogestedt	Sweden	1:49.72
	Žan Rudolf	Slovenia	DNF

Men's 110mH (+0.8 m/s)
Place	Athlete	Country	Time
1st place, gold medalist(s)	Koen Smet	Netherlands	13.59
2nd place, silver medalist(s)	Martin Vogel	Germany	13.62
3rd place, bronze medalist(s)	David King	Great Britain	13.63
4	Petr Svoboda	Czech Republic	13.77
5	Elmo Lakka	Finland	13.83
6	Max Hrelja	Sweden	13.95

Men's 3000mSC
Place	Athlete	Country	Time
1st place, gold medalist(s)	Samuel Firewu	Ethiopia	8:20.27
2nd place, silver medalist(s)	Zak Seddon	Great Britain	8:23.22
3rd place, bronze medalist(s)	Ibrahim Ezzaydouni	Spain	8:24.40
4	Amos Kirui	Kenya	8:30.39
5	Mohamed Amin Jhinaoui	Tunisia	8:40.78
6	Jens Mergenthaler	Germany	8:43.51
7	Víctor Ruiz	Spain	8:43.83
8	Emil Blomberg	Sweden	8:47.42
	Topi Raitanen	Finland	DNF
	Erik Djurberg	Sweden	DNF
	Wilberforce Chemiat Kones	Kenya	DNF

Women's 100m (−1.3 m/s)
Place	Athlete	Country	Time
1st place, gold medalist(s)	Kayla White	United States	11.23
2nd place, silver medalist(s)	Salomé Kora	Switzerland	11.31
3rd place, bronze medalist(s)	Marije van Hunenstijn	Netherlands	11.32
4	Naomi Sedney	Netherlands	11.44
5	Julia Henriksson	Sweden	11.66
6	Daniella Busk	Sweden	11.76
7	Nikki Anderberg	Sweden	11.97

Women's 1500m
Place	Athlete	Country	Time
1st place, gold medalist(s)	Diribe Welteji	Ethiopia	4:00.68
2nd place, silver medalist(s)	Shannon Osika	United States	4:00.93
3rd place, bronze medalist(s)	Helen Schlachtenhaufen	United States	4:01.09
4	Esther Guerrero	Spain	4:02.41
5	Karoline Bjerkeli Grøvdal	Norway	4:03.07
6	Tigist Ketema	Ethiopia	4:04.96
7	Sarah Lahti	Sweden	4:08.00
8	Caterina Granz	Germany	4:08.90
9	Amalie Sæten	Norway	4:10.00
10	Yolanda Ngarambe	Sweden	4:10.23
11	Sara Christiansson	Sweden	4:11.31
12	Hanna Hermansson	Sweden	4:12.25
13	Linn Söderholm	Sweden	4:15.75
	Rebecca Mehra	United States	DNF
	Anna Silvander	Sweden	DNF

== See also ==
- 2021 Weltklasse Zürich (Diamond League final)
