= 2021 Weltklasse Zürich =

Outdoor track and field meeting in Zürich, Switzerland

- Dates: 8–9 September 2021
- Host city: Zürich, Switzerland
- Venue: Letzigrund
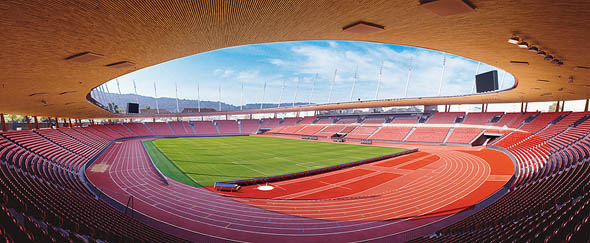
- Level: 2021 Diamond League

The 2021 Weltklasse Zürich was an outdoor track and field meeting in Zürich, Switzerland. Held on 8–9 September at the Letzigrund, it served as the finals of the 2021 Diamond League – the highest level international track and field circuit. It was the first time that Zürich exclusively hosted the Diamond League finals, as the 2020 Diamond League finals were cancelled due to COVID-19. It was also hailed as the best single-weekend track and field event of the year 2021.

The first day was highlighted by Ryan Crouser winning his first shot put Diamond League title, and Berihu Aregawi and Francine Niyonsaba winning the new road 5K finals. On the second day in the 1500 metres races, women's 1500 m Olympic champion Faith Kipyegon beat World champion Sifan Hassan, but on the men's side the reverse happened as World champion Timothy Cheruiyot bested Olympic champ Jakob Ingebrigtsen.

== Results ==
=== Day 1 Diamond League Finals ===
Men's Long Jump
Place	Athlete	Country	Mark
1st place, gold medalist(s)	Thobias Montler	Sweden	8.17 m (+0.1 m/s)
2nd place, silver medalist(s)	Steffin McCarter	United States	8.14 m (+0.5 m/s)
3rd place, bronze medalist(s)	Ruswahl Samaai	South Africa	7.99 m (+0.1 m/s)
4	Simon Ehammer	Switzerland	7.94 m (+0.5 m/s)
5	Benjamin Gföhler	Switzerland	7.90 m (+1.1 m/s)
6	Radek Juška	Czech Republic	7.87 m (+1.1 m/s)
7	Filippo Randazzo	Italy	7.87 m (+0.6 m/s)

Men's Shot Put
Place	Athlete	Country	Mark
1st place, gold medalist(s)	Ryan Crouser	United States	22.67 m
2nd place, silver medalist(s)	Joe Kovacs	United States	22.29 m
3rd place, bronze medalist(s)	Armin Sinančević	Serbia	21.86 m
4	Tom Walsh	New Zealand	21.61 m
5	Filip Mihaljević	Croatia	21.59 m
6	Zane Weir	Italy	20.85 m

Men's 5 km Road Race
Place	Athlete	Country	Time
1st place, gold medalist(s)	Berihu Aregawi	Ethiopia	12:59
2nd place, silver medalist(s)	Birhanu Balew	Bahrain	13:02
3rd place, bronze medalist(s)	Jacob Krop	Kenya	13:02
4	Nicholas Kimeli	Kenya	13:03
5	Yomif Kejelcha	Ethiopia	13:05
6	Michael Kibet	Kenya	13:16
7	Jonas Raess	Switzerland	13:44
8	Andrew Butchart	Great Britain	14:04
	Bethwell Birgen	Kenya	DNF
	Jerry Motsau	South Africa	DNF
	Matthew Ramsden	Australia	DNF

Women's High Jump
Place	Athlete	Country	Mark
1st place, gold medalist(s)	Mariya Lasitskene	Authorised Neutral Athletes	2.05 m
2nd place, silver medalist(s)	Yaroslava Mahuchikh	Ukraine	2.03 m
3rd place, bronze medalist(s)	Nicola Olyslagers	Australia	2.01 m
4	Iryna Herashchenko	Ukraine	1.96 m
5	Kamila Lićwinko	Poland	1.93 m
6	Eleanor Patterson	Australia	1.87 m

Women's Long Jump
Place	Athlete	Country	Mark
1st place, gold medalist(s)	Ivana Španović	Serbia	6.96 m (+0.2 m/s)
2nd place, silver medalist(s)	Khaddi Sagnia	Sweden	6.83 m (+0.8 m/s)
3rd place, bronze medalist(s)	Maryna Bekh-Romanchuk	Ukraine	6.75 m (+0.4 m/s)
4	Jazmin Sawyers	Great Britain	6.74 m (+0.9 m/s)
5	Malaika Mihambo	Germany	6.56 m (+0.8 m/s)
6	Nastassia Mironchyk-Ivanova	Belarus	6.53 m (+0.2 m/s)

Women's Shot Put
Place	Athlete	Country	Mark
1st place, gold medalist(s)	Maggie Ewen	United States	19.41 m
2nd place, silver medalist(s)	Auriol Dongmo	Portugal	18.86 m
3rd place, bronze medalist(s)	Fanny Roos	Sweden	18.75 m
4	Chase Ealey	United States	18.49 m
5	Danniel Thomas-Dodd	Jamaica	18.38 m
6	Aliona Dubitskaya	Belarus	18.34 m

Women's 5 km Road Race
Place	Athlete	Country	Time
1st place, gold medalist(s)	Francine Niyonsaba	Burundi	14:29
2nd place, silver medalist(s)	Hellen Obiri	Kenya	14:30
3rd place, bronze medalist(s)	Ejgayehu Taye	Ethiopia	14:31
4	Margaret Kipkemboi	Kenya	14:32
5	Eva Cherono	Kenya	14:37
6	Fantu Worku	Ethiopia	14:44
7	Lilian Kasait Rengeruk	Kenya	14:51
8	Karoline Bjerkeli Grøvdal	Norway	15:00
9	Beatrice Chebet	Kenya	15:12
10	Elise Cranny	United States	15:56
	Kate Van Buskirk	Canada	DNF

=== Day 2 Diamond League Finals ===
Men's 100m (−0.4 m/s)
Place	Athlete	Country	Time
1st place, gold medalist(s)	Fred Kerley	United States	9.87
2nd place, silver medalist(s)	Andre De Grasse	Canada	9.89
3rd place, bronze medalist(s)	Ronnie Baker	United States	9.91
4	Trayvon Bromell	United States	9.96
5	Akani Simbine	South Africa	10.10
6	Rohan Browning	Australia	10.18
7	Mike Rodgers	United States	10.23
8	Silvan Wicki	Switzerland	10.25
9	Yupun Abeykoon	Sri Lanka	10.25

Men's 200m (+0.5 m/s)
Place	Athlete	Country	Time
1st place, gold medalist(s)	Kenny Bednarek	United States	19.70
2nd place, silver medalist(s)	Andre De Grasse	Canada	19.72
3rd place, bronze medalist(s)	Fred Kerley	United States	19.83
4	Aaron Brown	Canada	20.13
5	Josephus Lyles	United States	20.13
6	Isaac Makwala	Botswana	20.31
7	Vernon Norwood	United States	20.46
8	William Reais	Switzerland	20.49

Men's 400m
Place	Athlete	Country	Time
1st place, gold medalist(s)	Michael Cherry	United States	44.41
2nd place, silver medalist(s)	Kirani James	Grenada	44.42
3rd place, bronze medalist(s)	Deon Lendore	Trinidad and Tobago	44.81
4	Vernon Norwood	United States	44.84
5	Liemarvin Bonevacia	Netherlands	45.35
6	Isaac Makwala	Botswana	45.41
7	Ricky Petrucciani	Switzerland	46.38
8	Davide Re	Italy	46.64

Men's 800m
Place	Athlete	Country	Time
1st place, gold medalist(s)	Emmanuel Korir	Kenya	1:44.56
2nd place, silver medalist(s)	Ferguson Rotich	Kenya	1:44.96
3rd place, bronze medalist(s)	Clayton Murphy	United States	1:45.21
4	Marco Arop	Canada	1:45.23
5	Elliot Giles	Great Britain	1:45.25
6	Isaiah Harris	United States	1:45.70
7	Amel Tuka	Bosnia and Herzegovina	1:46.19
8	Wyclife Kinyamal	Kenya	1:46.52
	Patryk Sieradzki	Poland	DNF

Men's 1500m
Place	Athlete	Country	Time
1st place, gold medalist(s)	Timothy Cheruiyot	Kenya	3:31.37
2nd place, silver medalist(s)	Jakob Ingebrigtsen	Norway	3:31.45
3rd place, bronze medalist(s)	Stewart McSweyn	Australia	3:32.14
4	Ollie Hoare	Australia	3:32.66
5	Mohamed Katir	Spain	3:32.77
6	Ronald Kwemoi	Kenya	3:33.34
7	Charles Simotwo	Kenya	3:34.24
8	Ignacio Fontes	Spain	3:34.45
9	Bethwell Birgen	Kenya	3:46.01
	Erik Sowinski	United States	DNF

Men's 110mH (+0.6 m/s)
Place	Athlete	Country	Time
1st place, gold medalist(s)	Devon Allen	United States	13.06
2nd place, silver medalist(s)	Ronald Levy	Jamaica	13.06
3rd place, bronze medalist(s)	Hansle Parchment	Jamaica	13.17
4	Daniel Roberts	United States	13.31
5	Paolo Dal Molin	Italy	13.43
6	Finley Gaio	Switzerland	13.72
7	Koen Smet	Netherlands	13.77
	Jason Joseph	Switzerland	DQ

Men's 400mH
Place	Athlete	Country	Time
1st place, gold medalist(s)	Karsten Warholm	Norway	47.35
2nd place, silver medalist(s)	Alison dos Santos	Brazil	47.81
3rd place, bronze medalist(s)	Kyron McMaster	British Virgin Islands	48.24
4	Rasmus Mägi	Estonia	48.84
5	Constantin Preis	Germany	49.08
6	Ramsey Angela	Netherlands	49.39
7	Chris McAlister	Great Britain	49.73
	Yasmani Copello	Turkey	DQ

Men's 3000mSC
Place	Athlete	Country	Time
1st place, gold medalist(s)	Benjamin Kigen	Kenya	8:17.45
2nd place, silver medalist(s)	Soufiane El Bakkali	Morocco	8:17.70
3rd place, bronze medalist(s)	Abraham Kibiwot	Kenya	8:18.16
4	Leonard Bett	Kenya	8:20.20
5	Getnet Wale	Ethiopia	8:21.11
6	Tadese Takele	Ethiopia	8:21.68
7	Hillary Bor	United States	8:24.81
8	Ahmed Abdelwahed	Italy	8:25.06
9	Mohamed Tindouft	Morocco	8:25.33
	Wilberforce Chemiat Kones	Kenya	DNF

Men's High Jump
Place	Athlete	Country	Mark
1st place, gold medalist(s)	Gianmarco Tamberi	Italy	2.34 m
2nd place, silver medalist(s)	Andriy Protsenko	Ukraine	2.30 m
3rd place, bronze medalist(s)	Ilya Ivanyuk	Authorised Neutral Athletes	2.30 m
4	Maksim Nedasekau	Belarus	2.27 m
5	Django Lovett	Canada	2.27 m
6	Donald Thomas	Bahamas	2.24 m

Men's Pole Vault
Place	Athlete	Country	Mark
1st place, gold medalist(s)	Armand Duplantis	Sweden	6.06 m
2nd place, silver medalist(s)	Sam Kendricks	United States	5.93 m
3rd place, bronze medalist(s)	Timur Morgunov	Authorised Neutral Athletes	5.93 m
4	EJ Obiena	Philippines	5.83 m
5	Chris Nilsen	United States	5.83 m
6	KC Lightfoot	United States	5.83 m

Men's Triple Jump
Place	Athlete	Country	Mark
1st place, gold medalist(s)	Pedro Pichardo	Portugal	17.70 m (+0.8 m/s)
2nd place, silver medalist(s)	Hugues Fabrice Zango	Burkina Faso	17.20 m (+0.5 m/s)
3rd place, bronze medalist(s)	Yasser Triki	Algeria	17.03 m (+0.4 m/s)
4	Tobia Bocchi	Italy	16.71 m (+0.3 m/s)
5	Tiago Pereira	Portugal	16.61 m (+0.6 m/s)
6	Donald Scott	United States	16.22 m (+0.6 m/s)

Men's Discus Throw
Place	Athlete	Country	Mark
1st place, gold medalist(s)	Daniel Ståhl	Sweden	66.49 m
2nd place, silver medalist(s)	Kristjan Čeh	Slovenia	65.39 m
3rd place, bronze medalist(s)	Fedrick Dacres	Jamaica	65.33 m
4	Andrius Gudžius	Lithuania	64.04 m
5	Simon Pettersson	Sweden	63.68 m
6	Lukas Weißhaidinger	Austria	63.20 m

Men's Javelin Throw
Place	Athlete	Country	Mark
1st place, gold medalist(s)	Johannes Vetter	Germany	89.11 m
2nd place, silver medalist(s)	Julian Weber	Germany	87.03 m
3rd place, bronze medalist(s)	Jakub Vadlejch	Czech Republic	85.22 m
4	Andrian Mardare	Moldova	84.98 m
5	Anderson Peters	Grenada	81.65 m
6	Simon Wieland	Switzerland	78.11 m
7	Gatis Čakšs	Latvia	68.67 m

Women's 100m (+0.6 m/s)
Place	Athlete	Country	Time
1st place, gold medalist(s)	Elaine Thompson-Herah	Jamaica	10.65
2nd place, silver medalist(s)	Dina Asher-Smith	Great Britain	10.87
3rd place, bronze medalist(s)	Ajla Del Ponte	Switzerland	10.93
4	Daryll Neita	Great Britain	10.93
5	Mujinga Kambundji	Switzerland	10.94
6	Javianne Oliver	United States	11.02
7	Natasha Morrison	Jamaica	11.10
8	Marie-Josée Ta Lou	Ivory Coast	11.22

Women's 200m (+0.6 m/s)
Place	Athlete	Country	Time
1st place, gold medalist(s)	Christine Mboma	Namibia	21.78
2nd place, silver medalist(s)	Shericka Jackson	Jamaica	21.81
3rd place, bronze medalist(s)	Dina Asher-Smith	Great Britain	22.19
4	Mujinga Kambundji	Switzerland	22.27
5	Daryll Neita	Great Britain	22.81
6	Beth Dobbin	Great Britain	22.88
7	Dezerea Bryant	United States	22.99
8	Marije van Hunenstijn	Netherlands	23.16

Women's 400m
Place	Athlete	Country	Time
1st place, gold medalist(s)	Quanera Hayes	United States	49.88
2nd place, silver medalist(s)	Marileidy Paulino	Dominican Republic	49.96
3rd place, bronze medalist(s)	Sada Williams	Barbados	50.24
4	Stephenie Ann McPherson	Jamaica	50.25
5	Candice McLeod	Jamaica	50.96
6	Natalia Kaczmarek	Poland	51.00
7	Lieke Klaver	Netherlands	51.09
8	Kaylin Whitney	United States	51.19

Women's 800m
Place	Athlete	Country	Time
1st place, gold medalist(s)	Keely Hodgkinson	Great Britain	1:57.98
2nd place, silver medalist(s)	Kate Grace	United States	1:58.34
3rd place, bronze medalist(s)	Natoya Goule	Jamaica	1:58.34
4	Jemma Reekie	Great Britain	1:58.61
5	Halimah Nakaayi	Uganda	1:58.89
6	Habitam Alemu	Ethiopia	1:59.48
7	Catriona Bisset	Australia	1:59.66
8	Lore Hoffmann	Switzerland	2:00.25
9	Lovisa Lindh	Sweden	2:00.84
	Noélie Yarigo	Benin	DNF

Women's 1500m
Place	Athlete	Country	Time
1st place, gold medalist(s)	Faith Kipyegon	Kenya	3:58.33
2nd place, silver medalist(s)	Sifan Hassan	Netherlands	3:58.55
3rd place, bronze medalist(s)	Josette Andrews	United States	4:00.41
4	Marta Pérez	Spain	4:01.94
5	Helen Schlachtenhaufen	United States	4:02.30
6	Linden Hall	Australia	4:03.50
7	Axumawit Embaye	Ethiopia	4:04.18
8	Winnie Nanyondo	Uganda	4:04.80
9	Katie Snowden	Great Britain	4:06.46
10	Sarah Healy	Ireland	4:18.60
	Chanelle Price	United States	DNF

Women's 100mH (+0.4 m/s)
Place	Athlete	Country	Time
1st place, gold medalist(s)	Tobi Amusan	Nigeria	12.42
2nd place, silver medalist(s)	Nadine Visser	Netherlands	12.51
3rd place, bronze medalist(s)	Megan Tapper	Jamaica	12.55
4	Payton Chadwick	United States	12.62
5	Cindy Sember	Great Britain	12.71
6	Gabbi Cunningham	United States	12.79
7	Luca Kozák	Hungary	12.90
8	Ditaji Kambundji	Switzerland	13.01
9	TeJyrica Robinson	United States	13.70

Women's 400mH
Place	Athlete	Country	Time
1st place, gold medalist(s)	Femke Bol	Netherlands	52.80
2nd place, silver medalist(s)	Shamier Little	United States	53.35
3rd place, bronze medalist(s)	Anna Ryzhykova	Ukraine	53.70
4	Viktoriya Tkachuk	Ukraine	53.76
5	Gianna Woodruff	Panama	54.50
6	Nnenya Hailey	United States	55.06
7	Janieve Russell	Jamaica	55.74
8	Léa Sprunger	Switzerland	55.87

Women's 3000mSC
Place	Athlete	Country	Time
1st place, gold medalist(s)	Norah Jeruto	Kenya	9:07.33
2nd place, silver medalist(s)	Hyvin Jepkemoi	Kenya	9:08.55
3rd place, bronze medalist(s)	Courtney Frerichs	United States	9:08.74
4	Mekides Abebe	Ethiopia	9:09.59
5	Celliphine Chespol	Kenya	9:10.26
6	Winfred Yavi	Bahrain	9:12.41
7	Peruth Chemutai	Uganda	9:20.16
8	Rosefline Chepngetich	Kenya	9:21.67
9	Gesa Felicitas Krause	Germany	9:32.69
10	Purity Cherotich Kirui	Kenya	9:38.56
	Fancy Cherono	Kenya	DNF

Women's Pole Vault
Place	Athlete	Country	Mark
1st place, gold medalist(s)	Anzhelika Sidorova	Authorised Neutral Athletes	5.01 m
2nd place, silver medalist(s)	Katerina Stefanidi	Greece	4.77 m
3rd place, bronze medalist(s)	Tina Šutej	Slovenia	4.67 m
4	Holly Bradshaw	Great Britain	4.67 m
5	Iryna Zhuk	Belarus	4.47 m
	Katie Moon	United States	NM

Women's Triple Jump
Place	Athlete	Country	Mark
1st place, gold medalist(s)	Yulimar Rojas	Venezuela	15.48 m (+0.3 m/s)
2nd place, silver medalist(s)	Shanieka Ricketts	Jamaica	14.64 m (+1.3 m/s)
3rd place, bronze medalist(s)	Kimberly Williams	Jamaica	14.47 m (+1.3 m/s)
4	Patrícia Mamona	Portugal	14.33 m (+1.9 m/s)
5	Thea LaFond	Dominica	14.10 m (+0.3 m/s)
	Hanna Knyazyeva-Minenko	Israel	NM

Women's Discus Throw
Place	Athlete	Country	Mark
1st place, gold medalist(s)	Valarie Allman	United States	69.20 m
2nd place, silver medalist(s)	Sandra Perković	Croatia	67.22 m
3rd place, bronze medalist(s)	Yaime Pérez	Cuba	64.83 m
4	Denia Caballero	Cuba	62.21 m
5	Liliana Cá	Portugal	61.92 m
6	Marija Tolj	Croatia	57.79 m

Women's Javelin Throw
Place	Athlete	Country	Mark
1st place, gold medalist(s)	Christin Hussong	Germany	65.26 m
2nd place, silver medalist(s)	Kelsey-Lee Barber	Australia	62.68 m
3rd place, bronze medalist(s)	Nikola Ogrodníková	Czech Republic	61.54 m
4	Barbora Špotáková	Czech Republic	61.43 m
5	Līna Mūze	Latvia	60.18 m
6	Maria Andrejczyk	Poland	52.30 m

=== Promotional Events ===
Men's 400mH
Place	Athlete	Country	Time
1st place, gold medalist(s)	Efekemo Okoro	Great Britain	49.34
2nd place, silver medalist(s)	Luke Campbell	Germany	49.80
3rd place, bronze medalist(s)	Joshua Abuaku	Germany	50.42
4	Dany Brand	Switzerland	50.48
5	Joshua Faulds	Great Britain	50.84
6	Nout Wardenburg	Netherlands	50.96
7	Julien Bonvin	Switzerland	51.10
8	Mattia Tajana	Switzerland	51.69

Women's 400m
Place	Athlete	Country	Time
1st place, gold medalist(s)	Amalie Iuel	Norway	51.64
2nd place, silver medalist(s)	Corinna Schwab	Germany	51.69
3rd place, bronze medalist(s)	Cátia Azevedo	Portugal	52.42
4	Alina Lohvynenko	Ukraine	52.94
5	Silke Lemmens	Switzerland	52.98
6	Agnė Šerkšnienė	Lithuania	52.99
7	Yasmin Giger	Switzerland	53.03
8	Audrey Werro	Switzerland	53.88

== See also ==
- 2021 Diamond League
