= Mark Lomuket =

Kenyan long-distance runner (born 1999)

Personal information
- Nationality: Kenya
- Born: Mark Owon Lomuket; 10 January 1999 (27 years, 172 days old)

Sport
- Sport: Athletics
- Event: 5000 metres

Achievements and titles
- National finals: 2019 Kenyan Champs; • 5000m, 10th
- Personal bests: 5000m: 13:01.68 (2021); 2 miles: 8:15.54 (2021)
- Updated on 28 December 2023

Mark Owon Lomuket (born 10 January 1999) is a Kenyan long-distance runner specializing in the 5000 metres. On 12 May 2021, he upset Olympic medallists Selemon Barega and Hagos Gebrhiwet to win the Bergamo Tuscany Camp Silver Meeting 5000 m in a time of 13:01.68.

== Biography ==
Lomuket is from Elgeyo-Marakwet County, Kenya. At the 2018 Elgeyo-Marakwet County cross country championships, he finished 10th in the under-20 race. After a 10th-place finish at the 2019 Kenyan Athletics Championships 5000 m and only one race in 2020, Lomuket had a breakout year in 2021.

On 12 May 2021, Lomuket was entered in a Bergamo 5000 m race that then-Worlds silver medallist (and future Olympic gold medallist) Selemon Barega had set up as a time trial. Most expected Barega to win, if not the other more accomplished runners in the field like Hagos Gebrhiwet or Edward Zakayo. But after a quick first half, Barega faded over the second half and with 150 metres remaining in the race, Lomuket surprisingly took the lead and won the race in a world-leading time of 13:01.68.

Despite hitting the Olympic qualifying standard in the race, on 19 June Lomuket finished just 7th at the Kenyan Olympic Trials, and was not selected for the 2021 Kenyan Olympic team.

Later that year on 26 July, Lomuket won the Giro di Castelbuono road race, the oldest road race in Europe. He was said to have broken a "curse" preventing Kenyans from winning the race.

The following month on 21 August, Lomuket ran the two miles Diamond League race at the 2021 Prefontaine Classic. Though he was well-beaten in 8th place, his time of 8:15.54 was the fastest eighth-place result ever in any two miles race.

== Statistics ==
=== Personal bests ===
| Event | Mark | Place | Competition | Venue | Date | Ref |
|---|---|---|---|---|---|---|
| 5000 metres | 13:01.68 | 1st place, gold medalist(s) | Silver Lombardia | Bergamo, Italy | 12 May 2021 | |
| Two miles | 8:15.54 | 8th | Prefontaine Classic | Eugene, Oregon | 21 August 2021 | |
