= TeJyrica Robinson =

American hurdler (born 1998)

Personal information
- Nationality: USA
- Born: 27 August 1998 (27 years, 308 days old)
- Home town: Quincy, Florida
- Education: Lincoln High School; Charleston Southern University; North Carolina A&T State University

Sport
- Sport: Athletics
- Event(s): 100 metres hurdles 60 metres hurdles
- College team: Charleston Southern Buccaneers; North Carolina A&T Aggies
- Now coaching: North Carolina Wesleyan Battling Bishops

Achievements and titles
- National finals: 2021 NCAAs; • 100m hurdles, 8th; 2021 USA Champs; • 100m hurdles, 9th
- Personal bests: 100mH: 12.65 (+1.3) (2021); 60mH: 8.12 (2020)
- Updated on 28 December 2023

TeJyrica Robinson (born 27 August 1998) is an American hurdler. She was a finalist in the 100 metres hurdles at the 2021 United States Olympic trials and the 2021 NCAA Division I Outdoor Track and Field Championships.

== Biography ==
Robinson is from Quincy, Florida and attended Lincoln High School from 2012 to 2016. At the 2016 class 3A Florida High School Athletic Association state championship, she finished 3rd in both the 100 metres hurdles and 300 metres hurdles.

Following high school, Robinson joined the Charleston Southern Buccaneers track and field team for the 2016–17 season, winning the Big South Conference outdoor championships in the 4 × 100 m relay. She then transferred to the North Carolina A&T Aggies track and field program for the rest of her collegiate career from 2018 to 2021.

At North Carolina AT&T, Robinson qualified for the 2021 NCAA Division I Outdoor Track and Field Championships in the 100 metres hurdles and advanced to the finals with a runner-up finish in her semi-final. At the finals, she fell on the last hurdle and had to walk to the finish, placing 8th in 29.11 seconds. Nonetheless, by qualifying for the finals she scored one point for North Carolina AT&T and was described as playing a role in the team's legitimacy.

Following the NCAA Championships, Robinson competed at the 2021 United States Olympic trials. She qualified for the 100 m hurdles finals and finished 9th in 12.99 seconds. After failing to make the team, Robinson ran the European professional track circuit over the summer, including winning a silver medal at the Hungarian Athletics Grand Prix and a bronze in the 2021 Anniversary Games 4 × 100 m.

Robinson is now an assistant coach for the North Carolina Wesleyan Battling Bishops track and field program.

== Statistics ==
=== Personal bests ===
Event	Mark	Place	Competition	Venue	Date	Ref
100 metres hurdles	12.65 (+1.3 m/s)	4th (semifinal #2)	United States Olympic trials	Eugene, Oregon	20 June 2021	
60 metres hurdles	8.12	1st place, gold medalist(s)	Mid-Eastern Athletic Conference Indoor Championships	Landover, Maryland	29 February 2020	
