= Archie Davis =

British middle-distance runner

Personal information
- Nationality: GBR
- Born: 16 October 1998 (28 years, 28 days old)
- Home town: Brighton, East Sussex
- Height: 6 ft 1 in (185 cm)

Sport
- Sport: Athletics
- Events: 800 metres 1500 metres Mile run
- Club: Brighton Phoenix
- Coached by: Joel Kidger

Achievements and titles
- National finals: 2016 British U20s; • 1500m, 6th; 2019 British Indoors; • 1500m, 6th; 2019 British Champs; • 1500m, 7th; 2020 British Champs; • 1500m, 5th; 2021 British Champs; • 1500m, 4th; 2022 British Indoors; • 800m, 5th; 2023 British Champs; • 800m, 8th
- Personal bests: 800m: 1:44.72 (2021); 1500m: 3:34.95 (2025); Mile: 3:54.27 (2021)
- Updated on 6 December 2023

Archie Davis (born 16 October 1998) is a British middle-distance runner. He is a five-time British Athletics Championships finalist outdoors and once indoors, with a best placing of 4th at the 2021 edition.

== Biography ==
Davis is from Sussex, United Kingdom and competed in athletics from an early age, being a standout under-13 athlete for the Brighton Phoenix athletics club.

Davis qualified for his first international championship at the age of 16, representing England at the 2015 Commonwealth Youth Games and finishing 4th in the 1500 m finals. The following year, Davis ran in the men's 1500 m at the 2016 World U20 Championships in Athletics. Affected by the death of his friend a week prior, he failed to qualify for the finals.

Later in 2016, Davis developed Plica syndrome in one of his knees, requiring surgery preventing him from running until February 2016. Despite this at the 2017 European Athletics U20 Championships, Davis qualified for the finals and finished in 5th place.

Davis had a breakthrough season in 2021, running a four-second personal best in the 800 metres and a 6-second best in the mile. Davis ran his first senior international championship at the 2021 European Indoor Championships men's 1500 m, finishing 6th place in his heat. Outdoors at the 2021 European Athletics Team Championships Super League, Davis finished 4th in the 1500 m final, scoring 4 points for his country.

At the 2021 British Athletics Championships, Davis finished 4th in the 1500 m, just one place away from selection for the 2021 Summer Olympics team.

== Statistics ==
=== Personal bests ===
Event	Mark	Place	Competition	Venue	Date
800 metres	1:44.72	2nd place, silver medalist(s)	Stockholm Diamond League	Stockholm, Sweden	4 July 2021
1500 metres	3:34.95	3rd place, bronze medalist(s)	Dresden Goldenes Ovale	Dresden, Germany	1 June 2025
Mile run	3:54.27	4th	Anniversary Games	Gateshead, United Kingdom	13 July 2021
