= Michael Kibet =

Kenyan middle- and long-distance runner

Personal information
- Nationality: Kenya
- Born: 3 September 1999 (27 years, 71 days old)

Sport
- Sport: Athletics
- Events: 3000 metres 5000 metres

Achievements and titles
- National finals: 2017 Kenyan U20 XC; • 8 km, 36th; 2019 Kenyan Champs; • 5000 m, 3rd (bronze); 2022 Kenyan XC Champs; • 10 km, 6th; 2022 Kenyan Champs; • 5000 m, 4th
- Personal bests: 3000 m: 7:37.80 (2021); 5000 m: 13:11.08 (2019)
- Updated on 7 December 2023

Michael Kibet (born 3 September 1999) is a Kenyan middle- and long-distance runner. He won the 5000 m at the Kenyan Trials for the 2019 World Athletics Championships, but was barred from competing at the meet by the Athletics Integrity Unit for not having had enough drug tests. In 2023, it was announced that Kibet was banned for four years from all high-level competitions due to a positive test from 20 September 2022.

== Biography ==
Kibet began running at a young age, training in Iten, Kenya while representing the Kenyan Police Service. He made his international debut in April 2019, winning the GP Brasil Caixa de Atletismo 1500 m in a time of 3:38.85.

On 13 September 2019, Kibet won the Kenyan World Championship Trials (separate from the earlier Kenyan Athletics Championships, in which he finished 3rd) in a time of 13:26.83 for 5000 m. The surprising win led Kibet to be hailed as Kenya's best hope for global gold in the 5000 metres at the World Athletics Championships, which had not been won by a Kenyan since 2005.

However, those hopes were quickly dashed when on 25 September, both Kibet and Trials runner-up Daniel Simiyu were barred from competing at the 2019 World Athletics Championships due to not having had enough drug tests performed before the competition. The Athletics Integrity Unit required at least three out-of-competition and one in-competition drug test per athlete, and because Kibet had only started competing internationally in 2019, he did not meet the requisite amount.

Despite this setback, Kibet continued to compete at a high level through 2022, winning the Kenyan pre-trials for the 2021 Summer Olympics. At the actual Kenyan Olympic Trials, Kibet ran the 4th fastest time in the heats but did not run in the 5000 m finals held on the same day.

== Doping ==
On 20 September 2022, a urine sample was collected from Kibet which later tested positive for an unspecified substance under the category of "Peptide hormones, growth factors, related substances and mimetics/erythropoietin (EPO)". Kibet was contacted about the test later in 2022, but according to the Athletics Kenya antidoping unit, he did not respond to repeated requests and did not contest the charges or represent himself in the matter. Because of this, Kibet was given the standard sentence of a four-year competition ban, from 30 June 2023 to 2027.

== Statistics ==
=== Personal bests ===
Event	Mark	Place	Competition	Venue	Date
3000 metres	7:37.80	7th	Anniversary Games	Gateshead, United Kingdom	13 July 2021
5000 metres	13:11.08 MR	1st place, gold medalist(s)	Palio Città della Quercia	Rovereto, Italy	27 August 2019
