= Rebecca Mehra =

American middle-distance runner (born 1994)

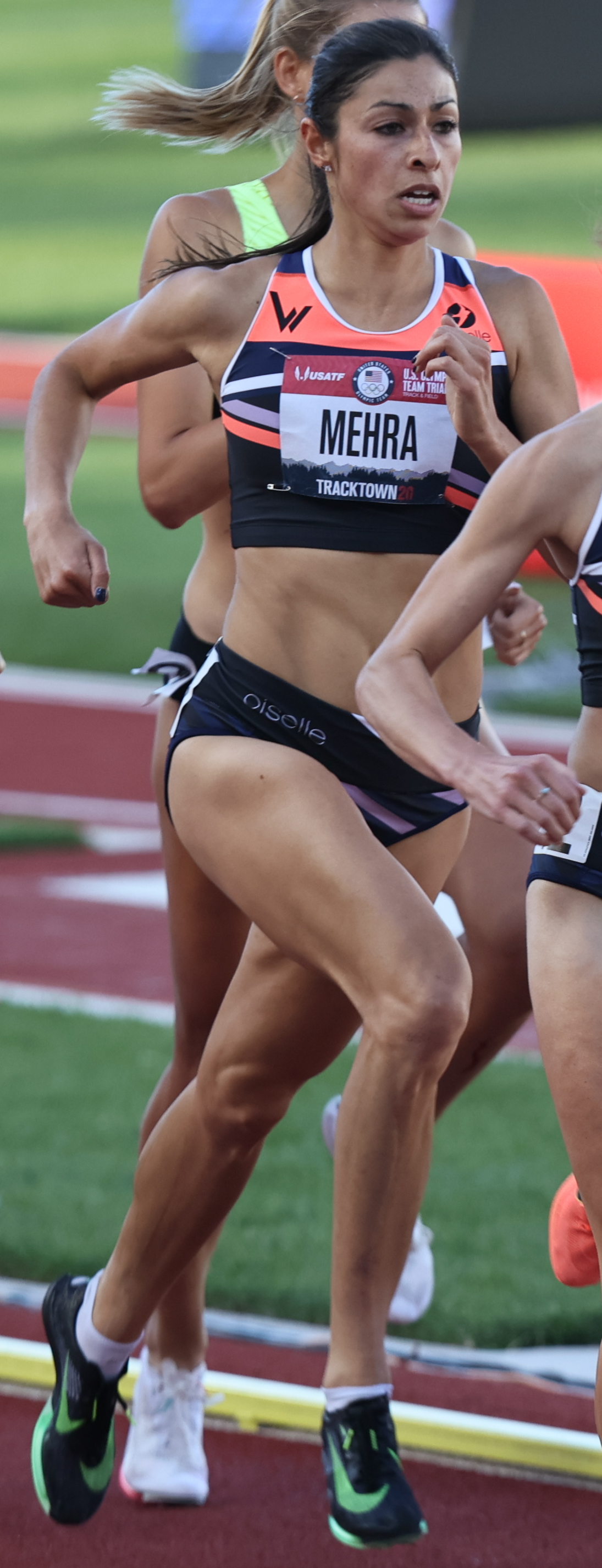
- Mehra at the 2021 United States Olympic trials

Personal information
- Nationality: United States
- Born: October 25, 1994 (age 32)
- Home town: Palos Verdes Estates, California
- Education: Palos Verdes High School; Stanford University

Sport
- Sport: Athletics
- Events: 1500 metres 800 metres
- College team: Stanford Cardinal
- Club: Oiselle Littlewing Athletics
- Coached by: Lauren Fleshman

Achievements and titles
- National finals: 2016 NCAA Indoors; • Distance medley, 3rd (bronze); 2017 NCAAs; • 1500m, 6th; 2019 USA Champs; • 800m, DQ; 2021 USA Champs; • 1500m, 11th
- Personal bests: 1500m: 4:04.90 (2021); 800m: 2:00.82 (2021)
- Updated on December 26, 2023

Rebecca Mehra (born October 25, 1994) is an American middle-distance runner. Running for Stanford University, she finished 3rd at the 2016 NCAA Division I Indoor Track and Field Championships in the distance medley relay, and she finished 11th at the 2021 United States Olympic trials in the 1500 m.

== Career ==
Mehra is from Palos Verdes Estates, California and attended Palos Verdes High School. Despite being affected by athletic asthma and a stress fracture on her foot, Mehra was one of the few athletes in California state history to achieve eight California Interscholastic Federation (CIF) state meet appearances – four in track and field and four in cross country. In the final track race of her high school career, she finished 2nd at the CIF women's 1600 metres finals to Nikki Hiltz.

From 2012 to 2017, Mehra was a member of the Stanford Cardinal track and field team. Though her collegiate career was interrupted by four femoral stress injuries, Mehra still achieved a third-place finish in the distance medley relay at the 2016 NCAA Championships, and a 6th-place finish in the 1500 m at the 2017 NCAA Championships.

At the 2017 Maccabiah Games, Mehra won silver medals in the 800 metres and 1500 metres, both behind gold medalist Sasha Gollish. Through meeting Gollish at the Games, Mehra was connected to Dr. Sarah Lesko from Oiselle and eventually joined the brand's Littlewing Athletics elite team.

By virtue of competing on the fourth-place Strava team at the 2017 USATF National Club Cross Country Championships, Mehra was selected to represent the United States at the 2018 Great Edinburgh International Cross Country, in the mixed gender 4 × 1 km relay. The team finished in 7th place.

Mehra won the 2021 Prefontaine Classic women's 1500 metres in a time of 4:06.39, under the non-Diamond League section of the meet program. At the 2021 United States Olympic trials, Mehra competed in both the 800 m and 1500 m. In the 800 m, Mehra finished 6th in her semi-final, having to jump over a fallen athlete during the race. She filed a protest to be placed into the finals, but the protest was not successful. In the 1500 m, Mehra advanced to the finals and finished 11th in a time of 4:08.47.

In 2022, Mehra suffered from long COVID symptoms and did not reach the finals of the 2022 USA Outdoor Track and Field Championships, ending her season early after that. Also in 2022, she was inducted into the Southern California Jewish Sports Hall of Fame.

In 2023, Mehra stumbled at the Sound Running Track Fest meet in June and later realized she had a acetabular labrum tear, which combined with another bout of COVID-19 ended her season again.

== Personal life ==
Mehra is the daughter of an Indian Punjabi immigrant father and a Jewish mother from Long Island, and she can write and speak Hindi.

In 2018, she worked as an intern for venture capital firm Andreessen Horowitz. She also began to work part-time for the Stanford Cardinal athletic department focusing on student-athlete development.

After being laid off from her Stanford job during the COVID-19 pandemic, Mehra became the special advisor and chief of staff for then-mayor of Bend, Oregon Sally Russell, expressing interest in public policy. Mehra stated her desire to represent the United States both athletically and diplomatically.

In March 2020, Mehra went viral for helping an elderly couple buy groceries during the COVID-19 pandemic. The incident was covered in CBS News, People Magazine, CNN, and The Daily Mail. Minneapolis City Council member Phillipe Cunningham was inspired by her story to start a volunteer program for community members to errands for elderly neighbors.

In October 2020, Mehra adopted two cats, Kobe and Cali. In fall 2023, Mehra coached high school cross country athletes in Mammoth Lakes, California.

In 2021, Mehra was a contestant on season 4 episode 16 of Ellen's Game of Games, a game show hosted by Ellen DeGeneres. She won the competition, including a $5000 prize.

In 2022, Mehra became a proxy for a USATF Foundation board member.

Mehra's favorite food is cheese, and she sought out a cheese sponsor following the 2021 Olympic trials.

== Statistics ==
=== Personal bests ===
Event	Mark	Place	Competition	Venue	Date	Ref
1500 metres	4:04.90	1st place, gold medalist(s)	Ed Murphey Classic	Memphis, Tennessee	August 14, 2021	
800 metres	2:00.82	3rd place, bronze medalist(s)	Ed Murphey Classic	Memphis, Tennessee	August 15, 2021	
