= Olivia Gruver =

American pole vaulter (born 1997)

Personal information
- Nationality: American
- Born: July 29, 1997 (age 29) Reisterstown, Maryland, U.S.
- Height: 5 ft 10 in (1.78 m)

Sport
- Sport: Track and field
- Event: Pole vault
- College team: Washington Huskies; Kentucky Wildcats
- Club: Nike
- Turned pro: 2020

Achievements and titles
- Personal bests: Pole vault indoor: 4.78 m (15 ft 8 in); Pole vault outdoor: 4.73 m (15 ft 6 in)
- Updated on February 25, 2021

Olivia Gruver (born July 29, 1997) is an American female pole vault athlete. Gruver represented Team USA at 2019 Pan Am Games where she placed 4th. Gruver won two NCAA pole vault titles and seven NCAA Division I All-American awards. As a Husky, Gruver set a College outdoor pole vault record.

== Professional ==
Gruver signed with Nike, Inc in 2020.

Year	Competition	Venue	Position	Event	Notes
Representing the United States
2019	Pan American Games	Lima, Peru	4th	Pole vault	4.55 m (14 ft 11 in)
USA National Championships
2021	USA Track and Field Olympic Trials	Eugene, Oregon	4th	Pole vault	4.60 m (15 ft 1 in)
2020	USA Track and Field Indoor Championships	Albuquerque, New Mexico	3rd	Pole vault	4.70 m (15 ft 5 in)
2019	USA Track and Field Outdoor Championships	Des Moines, Iowa	8th	Pole vault	4.55 m (14 ft 11 in)
2017	2017 USA Outdoor Track and Field Championships	Sacramento, California	10th	Pole vault	NH @ 4.40 m (14 ft 5 in)
2016	2016 USATF U20 Outdoor Championships	Clovis, California	4th	Pole vault	4.15 m (13 ft 7 in)
2014	2014 (U18) Youth USA Indoor Track and Field Championships	Landover, Maryland	1st	Pole vault	3.70 m (12 ft 2 in)

== NCAA track and field ==
Gruver is a seven time NCAA Division I All-American award honoree.

As a Husky, Gruver won 2019 Stanford Invitational in a College record.

As a Wildcat, Gruver won 2018 NCAA Division I Outdoor Track and Field Championships and 2017 NCAA Division I Outdoor Track and Field Championships pole vault titles.

Year	Competition	Venue	Position	Event	Notes
Representing Washington Huskies
2020	NCAA Division I Indoor Track and Field Championships	Albuquerque, New Mexico	Canceled due to COVID-19	Pole vault	
2020	Mountain Pacific Sports Federation Indoor Track and Field Championships	Seattle, Washington	1st	Pole vault	4.45 m (14 ft 7 in)
2019	NCAA Division I Outdoor Track and Field Championships	Austin, Texas	3rd	Pole vault	4.45 m (14 ft 7 in)
2019	Stanford Invitational	Stanford, California	1st	Pole vault	4.73 m (15 ft 6 in)
Representing Kentucky Wildcats
2018	NCAA Division I Outdoor Track and Field Championships	Eugene, Oregon	1st	Pole vault	4.55 m (14 ft 11 in)
2018	Southeastern Conference Outdoor Track and Field Championships	Knoxville, Tennessee	4th	Pole vault	4.51 m (14 ft 10 in)
2018	NCAA Division I Indoor Track and Field Championships	College Station, Texas	3rd	Pole vault	4.51 m (14 ft 10 in)
2018	Southeastern Conference Indoor Track and Field Championships	College Station, Texas	1st	Pole vault	4.67 m (15 ft 4 in)
2017	NCAA Division I Outdoor Track and Field Championships	Eugene, Oregon	1st	Pole vault	4.50 m (14 ft 9 in)
2017	Southeastern Conference Outdoor Track and Field Championships	Columbia, South Carolina	T-11th	Pole vault	NH @ 4.17 m (13 ft 8 in)
2017	NCAA Division I Indoor Track and Field Championships	College Station, Texas	3rd	Pole vault	4.40 m (14 ft 5 in)
2017	Southeastern Conference Indoor Track and Field Championships	Nashville, Tennessee	3rd	Pole vault	4.49 m (14 ft 9 in)
2016	NCAA Division I Outdoor Track and Field Championships	Eugene, Oregon	21st	Pole vault	4.05 m (13 ft 3 in)
2016	Southeastern Conference Outdoor Track and Field Championships	Tuscaloosa, Alabama	16th	Pole vault	NH @ 4.05 m (13 ft 3 in)
2016	Southeastern Conference Indoor Track and Field Championships	Fayetteville, Arkansas	8th	Pole vault	4.12 m (13 ft 6 in)

Olivia Gruver cleared 4.73 m (15 ft 6 in) on her second attempt to eclipse the 2015 record of 4.72 m (15 ft 6 in) set by former Arkansas Razorback champion Sandi Morris at the Southeastern Conference Outdoor Championships.

Video of Olivia Gruver pole vaulting at 2019 University of Washington Indoor Invitation

== Franklin High school ==
Olivia Gruver won the 2014 indoor, 2014 outdoor, and 2015 indoor track and field Maryland State pole vault titles, jumped 4.06 m (13 ft 4 in) at the 2014 Maryland Public Secondary Schools Athletic Association state championships to earn individual title in the Pole vault for Franklin High School (Reisterstown, Maryland). Gruver had personal best of High jump 1.53 m (5 ft 0 in), Pole vault 4.11 m (13 ft 6 in), Long jump 5.16 m (16 ft 11 in), Triple jump 10.425 m (34 ft 2.4 in).

Representing Franklin High School (Reisterstown, Maryland)
2015	New Balance Nationals Outdoor	Pole vault 3.98 m (13 ft 1 in); 5th
Year	MPSSAA Indoor Track and Field Championships	MPSSAA Outdoor Track and Field 3A Championships
2015	High jump 1.53 m (5 ft 0 in); 2nd Pole vault 4.07 m (13 ft 4 in); 1st	High jump 1.53 m (5 ft 0 in); 5th Long jump 5.00 m (16 ft 5 in); 6th 4 × 200 m relay 1:48.49; 10th
2014	Pole vault 3.96 m (13 ft 0 in); 1st	Pole vault 3.67 m (12 ft 0 in); 1st Long jump 5.16 m (16 ft 11 in); 5th
2013	Pole vault NH @ 2.88 m (9 ft 5 in) High jump 1.53 m (5 ft 0 in); 4th	
2012	High jump 1.48 m (4 ft 10 in); 8th	Pole vault 2.58 m (8 ft 6 in); 5th Triple jump 9.73 m (31 ft 11 in); 14th

Gruver won the 2014 Penn Relays pole vault title having cleared a 3.75 m (12 ft 4 in).
