= Matthew Ramsden =

Australian middle-distance runner

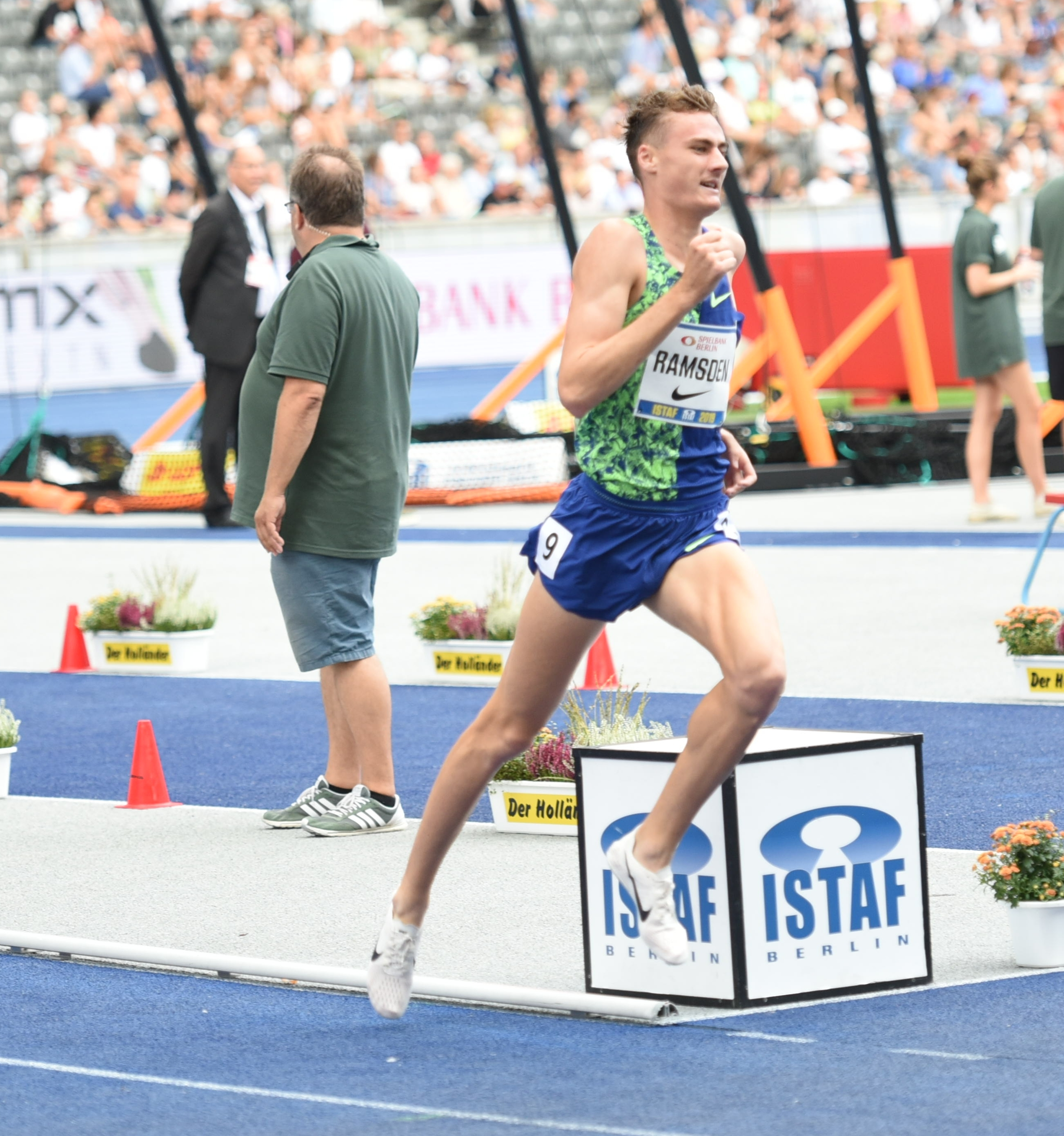

Personal information
- Nationality: Australian
- Born: 23 July 1997 (age 29)

Sport
- Sport: Athletics
- Event: 1500 metres
Medal record
Representing Australia
Men's athletics
Oceania Championships
Gold medal – first place	2019 Townsville	1500 metres

Matthew Ramsden (born 23 July 1997) is an Australian middle-distance runner. He won a gold medal in 1500 metres at the 2019 Oceania Athletics Championships in Townsville. He represented Australia at the 2019 World Athletics Championships, competing in men's 1500 metres.

Matthew also competed and won in the 2026 City to Surf race event with a time of 35:51 for 12 kilometres.

Ramsden studied a Bachelor of Commerce/Law at Deakin University.

== Personal bests ==
Outdoor

- 800 metres – 1:49.28 (Perth 2020)
- 1500 metres – 3:34.08 (Heusden-Zolder 2021)
- Mile – 3:51.23 (San Donato Milanese 2020)
- 3000 metres – 7:35.65 (Gateshead 2021)
- 5000 metres – 13:16.63 (Gothenburg 2020)

Indoor

- 3000 metres – 7:49.82 (Belgrade 2022)
