= Helen Schlachtenhaufen =

American runner

Personal information
- Born: Helen Schlachtenhaufen; March 14, 1995 (age 31) Lake Forest, Illinois, U.S.
- Height: 5 ft 7 in (170 cm)

Sport
- Sport: Athletics
- Event(s): 800 m 1500 m
- College team: Dartmouth
- Club: Nike
- Turned pro: 2017
Medal record
Women's athletics
Representing the United States
NACAC Championships
Bronze medal – third place	2022 Freeport	1500 m

Helen Schlachtenhaufen (born March 14, 1995) is an American middle-distance runner.

== Professional ==
Helen Schlachtenhaufen signed with Nike in 2021.

== Competition record ==
Year	Competition	Venue	Position	Event	Notes
Representing United States
2022	NACAC Championships	Freeport, Bahamas	3rd	1500 m	4:10.43
2023	World Athletics Road Running Championships	Riga, Latvia	17th	Mile	4:40.28

== NCAA ==
Schlachtenhaufen earned NCAA Division I All-American Second Team honors at 2017 NCAA Division I Outdoor Track and Field Championships. Schlachtenhaufen's senior year at Dartmouth in 2017, she captured the Ivy League title for the indoor mile for the second time and set a new Dartmouth record in the 1,500 meters (4:11.15) before graduating with a degree in psychology.

Year	Competition	Venue	Position	Event	Notes
Representing Dartmouth Big Green
2017	2017 NCAA Division I Outdoor Track and Field Championships	University of Oregon	16th	1500 m	4:20.43
2017	Ivy League Heptagonal Outdoor Track and Field Championships	Yale University	2nd	1500 m	4:29.97
2017	Ivy League Heptagonal Outdoor Track and Field Championships	Yale University	12th	800 m	2:13.55
2017	Ivy League Heptagonal Outdoor Track and Field Championships	Yale University	4th	4x800 m	8:45.70
2017	Heptagonal Indoor Track and Field Championships	Fort Washington Avenue Armory	1st	Mile	4:46.25
2017	Heptagonal Indoor Track and Field Championships	Fort Washington Avenue Armory	2nd	DMR	11:26.21
2016	2016 NCAA Division I Outdoor Track and Field Championships	University of North Florida	82nd	1500 m	4:31.66
2016	Ivy League Heptagonal Outdoor Track and Field Championships	Princeton University	9th	1500 m	4:31.91
2016	Ivy League Heptagonal Indoor Track and Field Championships	Cornell University	1st	Mile	4:53.44
2016	Ivy League Heptagonal Indoor Track and Field Championships	Cornell University	7th	DMR	11:57.00
2015	Ivy League Heptagonal Outdoor Track and Field Championships	University of Pennsylvania	8th	1500 m	4:37.23
2015	Ivy League Heptagonal Indoor Track and Field Championships	Harvard University	9th	Mile	5:00.34
2015	Ivy League Heptagonal Indoor Track and Field Championships	Harvard University	7th	4x880 yards	9:13.33
2014	Ivy League Heptagonal Outdoor Track and Field Championships	Yale University	11th	1500 m	4:33.56

== High school ==
In the 2013 Illinois High School Association a.k.a. IHSA Outdoor Track and Field Championships; Helen Schlachtenhaufen placed 11th in the 1600 meters in 5:07.59.

As a senior in 2012, Helen Schlachtenhaufen placed 61st in IHSA Class AAA State XC Championship in 17:46.0.

As a junior at the 2012 IHSA Outdoor Track and Field Championships; Helen Schlachtenhaufen, Caroline Marwede, Lisa Bennatan, Erin Malles placed 7th in the 4x800 meters in 9:39.50.

Schlachtenhaufen held the Lake Forest High School (Illinois) 800 m school record from 2013 to 2017 with her time of 2:18.33 and 1600 m school record of 5:03.63 from 2013 to 2017 when Emma Milburn reset both records.

== Personal bests ==
Surface	Event	Time	Date	Venue
Indoor track	One mile	4:23.94	February 11, 2023	The Armory
Indoor track	3000m	8:53.39	February 13, 2021	Ocean Breeze Athletic Complex
Outdoor track	800m	1:59.97	Jun 8th, 2024	Concord, MA
Outdoor track	1500m	3:59.71	June 30, 2024	Hayward Field
Outdoor track	One mile	4:27.09	Jun 7th, 2018	Concord, MA
Outdoor track	3000m	8:44.42	May 27, 2022	Hayward Field
Outdoor track	5000m	15:30.83	May 16, 2019	Los Angeles, CA
