= 2019 Norwegian Athletics Championships =

- Dates: 2–4 August
- Host city: Børstad, Hamar Municipality
- Venue: Hamar Idrettspark

The 2019 Norwegian Athletics Championships (Norwegian: NM i friidrett 2019) was the year's national outdoor track and field championships for Norway. It was held from 2–4 August at the Hamar Idrettspark in Børstad, Hamar Municipality. It was organised by FIK Orion and Hamar IL.

The King's trophy was awarded to women's distance runner Karoline Bjerkeli Grøvdal and hurdler Karsten Warholm (who also set a championship record in the 400 metres sprint). Warholm became the first man to win the trophy five years in a row. Javelin thrower Egil Danielsen, who died shortly before the competition, was honoured in the opening ceremony and a statue was placed outside of the stadium in Hamar.

== Championships ==
The following senior championships were held outside the main championships: [1]

Event	Venue	Date(s)	Notes
Indoor track and field	Haugesund	2–3 February	
Indoor combined events	Sandnes	23–24 February	
Cross country short course	Larvik	6-7 April	
Ultrarunning	Kristiansand Oslo	27 April 23–24 November	
Combined events	Modum	18–19 May	
Half marathon	Sandnes	25 May	
Relays	Lillehammer	25–26 May	
Mountain running	Valldal	22 June	
Marathon	Stavanger	31 August	
Cross country long course	Oslo	13 October	

== Results ==
=== Men ===
Event	Gold		Silver		Bronze	
100 metres (Wind: +2.3 m/s)	Salum Ageze Kashafali; Norna-Salhus IL	10.37	Mathias Hove Johansen; IL Skjalg	10.39	Jonathan Quarcoo; FIK Orion	10.48
200 metres	Mathias Hove Johansen; Idrettslaget Skjalg	21.27	Filip Bøe; Fana IL	21.49	Andreas Haara Bakketun; IL Gneist	21.67
400 metres	Karsten Warholm; Dimna IL	45.54 CR	Jørgen Kåshagen; Moelven IL	47.75	Lars Gausemel Stølen; Tyrving IL	49.41
800 metres	Filip Ingebrigtsen; Sandnes IL	1.48.45	Markus Einan; Ullensaker/Kisa IL	1.48.61	Didrik Hexeberg Warlo; Tyrving IL	1.49.59
1500 metres	Jakob Ingebrigtsen; Sandnes IL	3.36.33	Ferdinand Kvan Edman; IK Tjalve	3.44.56	Jacob Boutera; IL Gular	3.46.65
5000 metres	Henrik Ingebrigtsen; Sandnes IL	13:50.77	Per Svela; IL Gular	13:55.28	Sondre Nordstad Moen; SK Vidar	13:57.88
10,000 metres	Sondre Nordstad Moen; SK Vidar	28.13.14	Narve Gilje Nordås; Sandnes IL	29.19.23	Bjørnar Sandnes Lillefosse; IL Gular	29.44.98
110 m hurdles	Vladimir Vukicevic; SK Vidar	13.99	Sondre Guttormsen; SK Vidar	14.66	Henrik J. F. Holmberg; Vik IL	14.76
400 m hurdles	Karsten Warholm; Dimna IL	47.43	Andreas Haara Bakketun; IL Gneist	50.97	Joachim Sandberg; IK Tjalve	51.88
3000 m s'chase	Abduljaleel Mohamoud Ismail Hir; Steinkjer Friidrettsklubb	8:53.52	Abdalla Targan Tambaw Yousif; IF Herkules	9:10.61	Fredrik Sandvik; Askim IF	9:17.76
5000 m walk	Fredrik Vaeng Røtnes; BUL-Tromsø	22.39.96	Tobias Lømo; IK Tjalve	23.58.89	Andreas Pedersen Døske; Haugesund Idrettslag	24.24.28
Long jump	Ingar Kiplesund; Trondheim Friidrett	7.93 m	Martin Roe; FRI IL	7.51 m	Amund Høie Sjursen; IL Gneist	7.32 m
High jump	* Sander Skotheim; IK Tjalve	2.08 m	Vetle Raa Ellingsen; Fana IL	2.05 m	Frederik Jahr; Tyrving IL	2.00 m
Triple jump	Henrik Flåtnes; Tønsberg Friidrettsklubb	15.46 m	Ingar Kiplesund; Trondheim Friidrett	15.41 m	Viljar Helgestad Gjerde; Norna-Salhus IL	14.34 m
Pole vault	Sondre Guttormsen; SK Vidar	5.50 m	Pål Haugen Lillefosse; Fana IL	5.40 m	Eirik Greibrokk Dolve; Fana IL	5.00 m
Shot put	Marcus Thomsen; IK Tjalve	20.11 m	Michal Pawel Rozporski; Nittedal IL	18.24 m	Sven Martin Skagestad; Norna-Salhus IL	17.86 m
Discus throw	Ola Stunes Isene; Sturla IF	63.17 m	Sven Martin Skagestad; Norna-Salhus IL	58.01 m	Fabian Weinberg; Kristiansands IF	52.33 m
Javelin throw	Håkon Løvenskiold Kveseth; FIK Orion	71.35 m	Kasper Sagen; Bækkelagets SK	67.90 m	Alexander Skorpen; Halden IL	67.60 m
Hammer throw	Eivind Henriksen; IK Tjalve	76.86 m	Evald Osnes Devik; Gloppen Friidrettslag	65.63 m	Jon Bernhard Steinkopf Nerdal; Norna-Salhus IL	64.09 m
1000 m relay	Moelven IL; Magnus Bentdal Ingvaldsen; Carl Emil Kåshagen; Mauritz Kåshagen; Jørgen Kåshagen	1.54.41	Tyrving IL; Patrick Monga Bifuko; Kenneth Vik Gulbrandsen; Lars Gausemel Stølen; Markus Nikolai Berner	1.54.72	IL Skjalg; Sergejs Kononovs; Simen Tjelta Larsen; Mathias Hove Johansen; Mike Lubson	1.57.35

=== Women ===
Event	Gold		Silver		Bronze	
100 metres (Wind: +1.6 m/s)	Ezinne Okparaebo; Norna-Salhus IL	11.40	Helene Rønningen; Tyrving IL	11.48	Tonje Fjellet Kristiansen; FIK Orion	11.75
200 metres	Elisabeth Slettum; Idrettslaget Skjalg	23.91	Helene Rønningen; Tyrving IL	24.02	Tonje Fjellet Kristiansen; FIK Orion	24.38
400 metres	Amalie Iuel; Tyrving IL	52.43	Sara Dorthea Jensen; Kristiansands IF	54.36	Anne Skudal Dolvik; IL Gneist	57.37
800 metres	Hedda Hynne; IK Tjalve	2.02.30	Mina Marie Anglero; Tyrving IL	2.07.28	Amalie Manshaus Sæten; Ullensaker/Kisa IL	2.08.22
1500 metres	Sigrid Jervell Våg; IL i BUL	4:23.71	Amalie Manshaus Sæten; Ullensaker/Kisa IL	4:24.33	Mina Marie Anglero; Tyrving IL	4:25.28
5000 metres	Maria Sagnes Wågan; IK Tjalve	16:42.99	Runa Skrove Falch; SK Vidar	16:43.98	Pernilla Eugenie Epland; Stord IL	17:00.80
10,000 metres	Therese Johaug; FIK Ren-Eng	32.20.86	Maria Sagnes Wågan; IK Tjalve	34.47.35	Runa Skrove Falch; SK Vidar	35.26.25
100 m hurdles	Isabelle Pedersen; IL i BUL	13.16	Ida Eikeng; Urædd	13.52	Martine Hjørnevik; Norna-Salhus IL	13.68
400 m hurdles	Amalie Iuel; Tyrving IL	56.08	Elisabeth Slettum; Idrettslaget Skjalg	58.84	Nora Kollerød Wold; Fredrikstad IF	59.63
3000 m s'chase	Karoline Bjerkeli Grøvdal; IK Tjalve	9:24.53	Sara Aarsvoll Svarstad; SK Vidar	11:01.54	Olea Villa Furre; Selsbakk IF	11:19.10
3000 metres walk	Merete Helgheim; Førde IL	14:07.86	Siri Gamst Glittenberg; Laksevåg TIL	14:25.00	Maren Karlsen Bekkestad; Sturla IF	14:39.73
Long jump	Oda Utsi Onstad; Norna-Salhus IL	6.34 m	Mia Guldteig Lien; Ranheim IL	5.94 m	Thale Leirfall Bremset; Stjørdal Friidrettsklubb	5.85 m
High jump	Tonje Angelsen; IK Tjalve	1.86 m	Thea Leirfall Bremset; Stjørdal Friidrettsklubb	1.75 m	Katarina Mögenburg; Tyrving IL	1.70 m
Triple jump	Oda Utsi Onstad; Norna-Salhus IL	13.56 m	Monika Benserud; IL Gneist	12.88 m	Chiamaka Okparaebo; IL i BUL	12.80 m
Pole vault	Lene Retzius; IL i BUL	4.32 m	* Birgitte Kjuus; Ullensaker/Kisa IL	4.00 m	Agnes Elisabeth Morud; Ranheim IL	3.70 m
Shot put	Mona Ekroll Jaidi; Norna-Salhus IL	13.68 m	Camilla Leonardsen Rønning; Nittedal IL	13.04 m	Kristina Thunem; Fiskå IL	12.55 m
Discus throw	Elisabeth Thon Rosvold; Asker SK	49.33 m	Mona Ekroll Jaidi; Norna-Salhus IL	48.89 m	Vilde Indseth Holten; IK Tjalve	47.39 m
Javelin throw	Ane Dahlen; Tyrving IL	55.29 m	Emilie Ingerø; Halden IL	53.43 m	Kristina Kristianslund; Bækkelagets SK	50.15 m
Hammer throw	Beatrice Nedberge Llano; Laksevåg TIL	64.38 m	Helene Sofie Slottholm Ingvaldsen; Norna-Salhus IL	57.13 m	Helle Henriksen Hvidsten; Modum Friidrettsklubb	56.22 m
1000 m relay	IL Skjalg; Nathalie Johnsen; Anna Bogunovic Jakobsen; Elisabeth Slettum; Marin Stray Gautadottir	2.15.34	Sandnes IL; Hanne Berit Irgens; Agathe Holtan Wathne; Astrid Mangen Ingebrigtsen; Nora Haugen	2.16.59	Kristiansands IF; Mari Breilid; Emma Natalie Hagen Dhir; Tina Helen Bergem; Sara Dorthea Jensen	2.27.20
