= 2020 Norwegian Indoor Athletics Championships =

- Dates: 1–2 February
- Host city: Bærum
- Venue: Bærum Idrettspark

The 2020 Norwegian Indoor Athletics Championships (Norwegian: Norgesmesterskapet i friidrett innendørs 2020) was the year's national indoor track and field championships for Norway. It was held on 1 and 2 February at the Bærum Idrettspark in Bærum. It was organised by Oslo og Akershus Friidrettskrets.

== Results ==
=== Men ===
Event	Gold		Silver		Bronze	
60 metres	Even Meinseth; IL Gular	6.83	Mathias Hove Johansen; IL Skjalg	6.85	Amund Høie Sjursen; IL Gneist	6.87
200 metres	Mathias Hove Johansen; IL Skjalg	21.39	Filip Bøe; Fana IL	21.56	Andreas Haara Bakketun; IL Gular	21.57 PB
400 metres	Fredrik Gerhardsen Øvereng; Overhalla IL	48.31 PB	Jørgen Kåshagen; Moelven IL	48.65	Sebastian Casper Plows; Nittedal IL	49.45
800 metres	Didrik Hexeberg Warlo; Tyrving IL	1:49.87	Sigurd Tveit; Kristiansand Løpeklubb	1:50.77	Thomas Roth; Ullensaker/Kisa IL	1:51.06
1500 metres	Narve Gilje Nordås; Sandnes IL	3:55.15	Marius Øyre Vedvik; IL Gular	3:55.32	Erik Udø Pedersen; Ullensaker/Kisa IL	3:55.79
3000 metres	Marius Vedvik; IL Gular	8:23.63	Per Svela; Ullensaker/Kisa IL	8:23.74	Bjørnar Sandnes Lillefosse; IL Gular	8:24.29
60 m hurdles	Vladimir Vukicevic; SK Vidar	7.91	Håvard Becker; Sem IF	8.39	Carl Erik Hjellestad Landsvik; Fana IL	8.53
High jump	Vetle Raa Ellingsen; Fana IL	2.08 m	Toralv Opsal; Dimna IL	2.04 m	Abraham Sandvin Vogelsang; IK Tjalve	2.04 m
Standing high jump	Martin Fagelund; Sturla IF	1.67 m	Ola Stunes Isene; Sturla IF	1.64 m	Alexander Nyberget; Askim IF Muamba Caleb Kongolo; Søndre Land IL Sondre Alexander Høyland; Tyrving IL	1.55 m
Pole vault	Pål Haugen Lillefosse; Fana IL	5.65 m	Eirik Greibrokk Dolve; Fana IL	5.20 m	Andreas Fernandes Thomaz Gjesdal; IK Tjalve	5.10 m
Long jump	Ingar Kiplesund; SK Vidar	7.47 m	Henrik Flåtnes; Tønsberg Friidrettsklubb	7.33 m	Marius Bull Hjeltnes; IK Tjalve	7.29 m
Standing long jump	Joachim Peter Skjønhaug; Bækkelagets SK	3.34 m	Eivind Kleven Hagen; Fagernes IL	3.29 m	Kenneth Bjorvatn; Birkenes IL	3.29 m
Triple jump	Marius Bull Hjeltnes; IK Tjalve	14.96 m	Sondre Vie Ytrearne; Fana IL	14.91 m	* Sander Skotheim; IK Tjalve	14.89 m
Shot put	Marcus Thomsen; IK Tjalve	21.01 m	Sondre Alexander Høyland; Tyrving IL	14.34 m	Toralv Opsal; Dimna IL	13.83 m
4 × 200 m relay	IL Gular; Even Meinseth; Andreas Haara Bakketun; Torbjørn Lysne; Tor-Junor Kringstad Vedde	1:28.96	IL Gneist; Gjert Høie Sjursen; Herman Ellingsen; Kristoffer André Johannes Blücher; Thomas Strønstad-Løseth	1:29.98	Not awarded	
5000 metres walk	Håvard Haukenes; Norna-Salhus IL	19:56.45	Andreas Døske; Haugesund IL	23:09.56	Tobias Lømo; IK Tjalve	23:27.78

=== Women ===
Event	Gold		Silver		Bronze	
60 metres	Henriette Jæger; Aremark IF	7.37	Helene Rønningen; Tyrving IL	7.45	Vilde Humstad Aasmo; IK Tjalve	7.57
200 metres	Henriette Jæger; Aremark IF	23.55	Helene Rønningen; Tyrving IL	23.97	Elisabeth Slettum; IL Skjalg	24.07
400 metres	Amalie Iuel; IK Tjalve	52.25	Line Kloster; SK Vidar	54.11	Nora Kollerød Wold; Fredrikstad IF	55.09
800 metres	Hedda Hynne; IK Tjalve	2:04.79	Malin Edland; IK Tjalve	2:09.71	Sigrid Bjørnsdatter Wahlberg; Ranheim IL	2:11.40
1500 metres	Malin Edland; IK Tjalve	4:30.20	Grethe Tyldum; Steinkjer FIK	4:32.13	Kristine Lande Dommersnes; Haugesund IL	4:32.53
3000 metres	Kristine Lande Dommersnes; Haugesund IL	9:42.77	Andrea Modin Engesæth; IL Runar	9:44.48	Mari Roligheten Ruud; IL Runar	9:49.26
60 m hurdles	Isabelle Pedersen; IL i BUL	8.17	Andrea Rooth; Lambertseter IF	8.46	Martine Kolbeinshavn Hjørnevik; Norna-Salhus IL	8.60
High jump	Tonje Angelsen; IK Tjalve	1.90 m	Katarina Mögenburg; IL Tyrving	1.81 m	Madelen Haaheim Sveinungsen; Sørild FIK	1.70 m
Standing high jump	Katarina Mögenburg; Tyrving IL	1.50 m	Telma Eid; Søndre Land IL	1.35 m	Not awarded	
Pole vault	Birgitte Kjuus; Ullensaker/Kisa IL	3.80 m	Agnes Elisabeth Morud; Ranheim IL	3.44 m	Synne Marie Engebretsen; Fana IL	3.44 m
Long jump	Mia Guldteig Lien; Ranheim IL	5.97 m	Thale Leirfall Bremset; Stjørdal FIK	5.97 m	Lisa Wilker; Tingvoll Friidrettsklubb	5.61 m
Standing long jump	Oda Utsi Onstad; IL Norna-Salhus	3.04 m NR	Gracia Thiama Kongolo; Søndre Land IL	2.70 m	Ingvild Meinseth; Sørild FIK	2.65 m
Triple jump	Monika Benserud; IL Gneist	12.79 m	Mari Sellevåg Aarø; Norna-Salhus IL	12.25 m	Hedda Kronstrand Kvalvåg; IK Tjalve	12.25 m
Shot put	Lotta Flatum Fallingen; Brandbu IF	14.35 m	Elisabeth Thon Rosvold; Asker SK	13.31 m	Hanna Emilie Hjeltnes; Ullensaker/Kisa IL	12.64 m
4 × 200 metres relay	IK Tjalve; Lakeri Ertzgaard; Kajsa Rooth; Sara Dorthea Jensen; Amalie Iuel	1:39.09	Fredrikstad IF; Marlén Aakre; Nora Kollerød Wold; Anniken Aarebråten; Ida Andrea Breigan	1:40.99	IL Tyrving; Miranda Lauvstad; Lea Mathilde Trong-Johansen; Kaja Carlsen-Brown; Helene Rønningen	1:42.27
3000 metres walk	Siri Gamst Glittenberg; Laksevåg TIL	14:05.36	Maren Karlsen Bekkestad; Sturla IF	—	Fride Møller Flatin; Dimna IL	16:07.34
