= 2020 Norwegian Athletics Championships =

- Dates: 18–20 September
- Host city: Bergen
- Venue: Fana Stadion
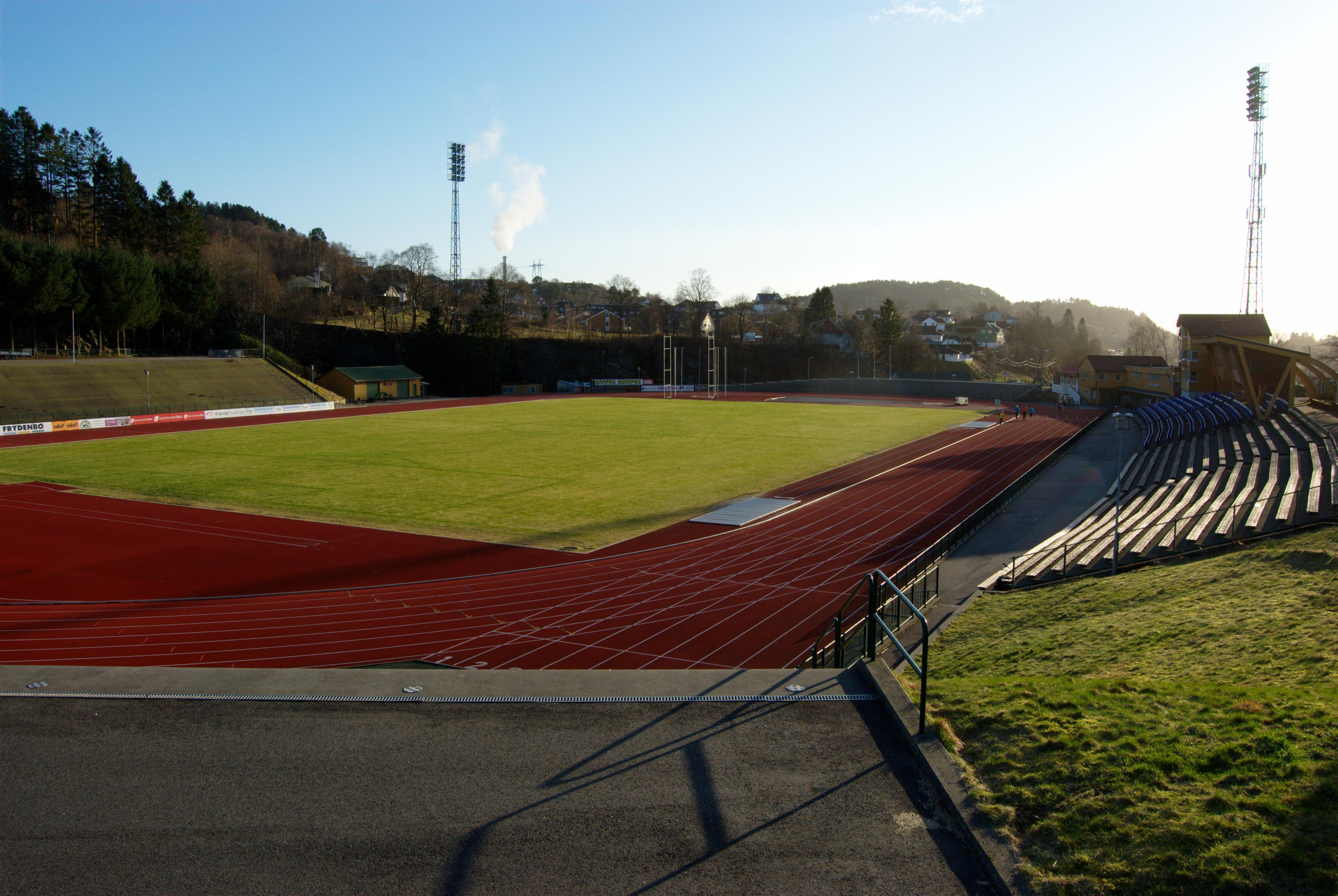

The 2020 Norwegian Athletics Championships (Norwegian: NM i friidrett 2020) was the year's national outdoor track and field championships for Norway. It was held from 2–4 August at the Fana Stadion in Bergen. It was organised by Fana IL, IL Gneist and IL Bjarg serving as organisers.

The King's Cups were won by Jakob Ingebrigtsen and Amalie Iuel.

== Championships ==
Several outdoor senior national championships were staged. Separate championships are also arranged for juniors and masters athletes, and in several cases there are separate junior and masters events incorporated into the senior championships.

Championship	Date	Place
Short Cross Country	18–19 April (canceled)	Trondheim
Relays	23–24 May (postponed until 2021)	Stavanger
Marathon	4 July (postponed until 2021)	Jølster
Combined events	8–9 August (postponed from 31 May)	Fagernes
Mountain running	29 August (postponed until 2021)	Førde
Half marathon	3 October	Jessheim
Trail running	26 September (postponed until 2021)	Molde
Long-distance cross country	11 October	Skien
100 kilometres	5 December (postponed until spring 2021)	Bergen

== Results ==
=== Men ===
Event	Gold		Silver		Bronze	
100 metres	Even Meinseth; IL Gular	10.69	Mathias Hove Johansen; IL Skjalg	10.70	Jacob Vaula; Stord IL	10.84
200 metres	Mathias Hove Johansen; IL Skjalg	21.36	Andreas Haara Bakketun; IL Gular	21.79	Filip Bøe; Fana IL	22.05
400 metres	Fredrik Gerhardsen Øvereng; Overhalla IL	47.21	Andreas Haara Bakketun; IL Gular	47.89	Tor-Junor Kringstad Vedde; IL Gular	48.21
800 metres	Jakob Ingebrigtsen; Sandnes IL	1:48.72	Sigurd Tveit; Kristiansand Løpeklubb	1:49.08	Didrik Hexeberg Warlo; IL Tyrving	1:49.15
1500 metres	Jakob Ingebrigtsen; Sandnes IL	3:33.93	Mats Hauge; IL Gular	3:46.99	Moa Abounnachat Bollerød; Sem IF	3:47.47
5000 metres	Narve Gilje Nordås; Sandnes IL	14:02.66	Zerei Kbrom Mezngi; Stavanger FIK	14:03.67	Bjørnar Sandnes Lillefosse; IL Gular	14:03.98
10,000 metres	Zerei Kbrom Mezngi; Stavanger FIK	28:04.29	Narve Gilje Nordås; Sandnes IL	28:20.55	Bjørnar Sandnes Lillefosse; IL Gular	28:23.46
110 m hurdles	Vladimir Vukicevic; SK Vidar	14.00	Joachim Sandberg; IK Tjalve	14.67	Julian Skimmeland Aasheim; Stord IL	15.14
400 m hurdles	Karsten Warholm; Dimna IL	48.23	Andreas Joseph Dixon; Fana IL	53.61	Herman Ellingsen; IL Gneist	55.36
3000 m s'chase	Harald Kårbø; Stord IL	8:53.11	Fredrik Sandvik; Ullensaker/Kisa IL	8:53.16	Abdalla Targan Tambaw Yousif; IF Herkules	9:07.58
5000 m walk	Tobias Lømo; IK Tjalve	23:50.79	Andreas Døske; Haugesund IL	24:18.68	Magnus Græsli; Leinstrand IL	24:30.67
Half marathon	Marius Vedvik; IL Gular	1:04:42	Isaac Tesfamichael; Leksvik IL	1:04:53	Eivind Øygard; Jølster IL	1:05:17
Cross country (long course)	Filip Ingebrigtsen; Sandnes IL	29:23	Magnus Tuv Myhre; Brandbu IF	30:27	Jonatan Vedvik; Tønsberg Friidrettsklubb	30:38
Long jump	Henrik Flåtnes; Tønsberg FIK	7.62 m	Ingar Kiplesund; SK Vidar	7.40 m	Marius Bull Hjeltnes; IK Tjalve	6.86 m
High jump	* Sander Skotheim; IK Tjalve	2.08 m	Erlend Bolstad Raa; Fana IL	2.05 m	Vetle Raa Ellingsen; Fana IL	2.00 m
Triple jump	Henrik Flåtnes; Tønsberg FIK	15.77 m	Ingar Kiplesund; SK Vidar	15.65 m	Sander Aae Skotheim; IK Tjalve	15.02 m
Pole vault	Sondre Guttormsen; SK Vidar	5.55 m	Pål Haugen Lillefosse; Fana IL	5.50 m	Simen Guttormsen; SK Vidar	5.45 m
Shot put	Marcus Thomsen; IK Tjalve	18.39 m	Sven Martin Skagestad; Norna-Salhus IL	17.63 m	Ola Stunes Isene; Sturla IF	16.40 m
Discus throw	Ola Stunes Isene; Sturla IF	60.19 m	Sven Martin Skagestad; Norna-Salhus IL	59.27 m	Eivind Henriksen; IK Tjalve	52.83 m
Javelin throw	Kasper Sagen; Bækkelagets SK	79.90 m	Myron Weinberg; Kristiansands IF	67.36 m	Sondre Alexander Høyland; IL Tyrving	66.47 m
Hammer throw	Eivind Henriksen; IK Tjalve	76.40 m	Evald Osnes Devik; Gloppen FIL	65.10 m	Kjetil Røste Ringen; Brandbu IF	60.86 m
1000 m relay	IL Gular; Even Meinseth; Torbjørn Lysne; Andreas Haara Bakketun; Tor-Junor Kringstad Vedde	1:54.18	IL Skjalg; Sergejs Kononovs; Mike Lubsen; Mathias Hove Johansen; Oscar Alm Harestad	1:54.34	IL Gneist; Gjert Høie Sjursen; Herman Ellingsen; Kristoffer André Johannes Blücher; Thomas Strønstad-Løseth	1:54.85
Decathlon	Martin Roe; FRI IL	7991 pts	Gjert Høie Sjursen; IL Gneist	6542 pts	Simen Sebastian Hansen; Ås IL	5890 pts

=== Women ===
Event	Gold		Silver		Bronze	
100 metres	Helene Rønningen; IL Tyrving	11.76	Ingvild Meinseth; Sørild FIK	11.96	Vilde Humstad Aasmo; IK Tjalve	12.18
200 metres	Henriette Jæger; Aremark IF	23.60	Line Kloster; SK Vidar	23.81	* Linn Oppegaard; Moss IL	24.36
400 metres	Henriette Jæger; Aremark IF	52.90	* Linn Oppegaard; Moss IL	53.56	Ingrid Pernille Rismark; SK Vidar	54.88
800 metres	Hedda Hynne; IK Tjalve	2:03.64	Ingeborg Østgård; FIK Ren-Eng	2:05.00	Amalie Manshaus Sæten; Ullensaker/Kisa IL	2:05.55
1500 metres	Amalie Manshaus Sæten; Ullensaker/Kisa IL	4:38.30	Sigrid Jervell Våg; IK Tjalve	4:39.55	Ina Halle Haugen; IL Runar	4:39.76
5000 metres	Sigrid Jervell Våg; IK Tjalve	16:15.02	Vienna Søyland Dahle; IL Skjalg	16:16.29	Maria Sagnes Wågan; IK Tjalve	16:17.68
10,000 metres	Vienna Søyland Dahle; IL Skjalg	33:28.39	Maria Sagnes Wågan; IK Tjalve	33:31.90	Hanne Mjøen Maridal; Ullensaker/Kisa IL	33:39.39
100 m hurdles	Andrea Rooth; Lambertseter IF	13.50	Ingrid Pernille Rismark; SK Vidar	13.97	Marlén Aakre; Fredrikstad IF	14.04
400 m hurdles	Amalie Iuel; IK Tjalve	55.63	Andrea Rooth; Lambertseter IF	56.95	Nora Kollerød Wold; Fredrikstad IF	57.10
3000 m s'chase	Andrea Modin Engesæth; IL Runar	9:57.95	Sara Aarsvoll Svarstad; SK Vidar	10:21.30	Sigrid Alvik; IL Tyrving	10:21.47
3000 m walk	Siri Gamst Glittenberg; Laksevåg TIL	13:37.45	Maren Karlsen Bekkestad; Sturla IF	13:49.05	Fride Møller Flatin; Dimna IL	14:41.42
Half marathon	Vienna Søyland Dahle; IL Skjalg	1:14:19	Hanne Mjøen Maridal; Ullensaker/Kisa IL	1:14:29	Astrid Brathaug Sørset; Tyrving IL	1:18:26
Cross country (long course)	Karoline Bjerkeli Grøvdal; IK Tjalve	19:04	Maria Sagnes Wågan; IK Tjalve	20:22	Silje Fjørtoft; Ullensaker/Kisa IL	20:50
Long jump	Mia Guldteig Lien; Ranheim IL	6.22 m	Thale Leirfall Bremset; Stjørdal FIK	6.04 m	Henriette Jæger; Aremark IF	6.04 m
High jump	Mia Guldteig Lien; Ranheim IL	1.80 m	Hedvig Kallåk; IL Tyrving	1.75 m	Tonje Angelsen; IK Tjalve	1.75 m
Triple jump	Hedda Kronstrand Kvalvåg; IK Tjalve	12.73 m	Mari Sellevåg Aarø; Norna-Salhus IL	12.69 m	Rachel Ombeni; Norna-Salhus IL	12.28 m
Pole vault	Lene Retzius; IL i BUL	3.80 m	Agnes Elisabeth Morud; Ranheim IL	3.50 m	Kitty Augusta Friele Faye; Fana IL	3.30 m
Shot put	Elisabeth Thon Rosvold; Asker Skiklubb	13.59 m	Birthe Franck-Petersen; Ålesund FIK	13.26 m	Hanna Emilie Hjeltnes; Ullensaker/Kisa IL	12.95 m
Discus throw	Elisabeth Thon Rosvold; Asker Skiklubb	49.76 m	Lotta Flatum Fallingen; Brandbu IF	48.64 m	Solveig Fredriksen; Fana IL	46.94 m
Javelin throw	Ane Dahlen; IL Tyrving	54.76 m	Stella Weinberg; Kristiansands IF	54.49 m	Kaja Mørch Pettersen; Larvik Turn & IF	52.03 m
Hammer throw	Beatrice Nedberge Llano; Laksevåg TIL	66.78 m	Oda Marie Myklebust; Bergens TF	56.78 m	Solveig Fredriksen; Fana IL	56.32 m
1000 m relay	IK Tjalve; Vilde Humstad Aasmo; Line Maltun Helland; Kaitesi Auma Ertzgaard; Amalie Iuel	2:10.26	SK Vidar; Helene Oulie; Maria Aaberg; Ingrid Pernille Rismark; Line Kloster	2:10.56	Fredrikstad IF; Emma Skibstad Bekkevik; Marlén Aakre; Ida Andrea Breigan; Nora Kollerød Wold	2:11.39
Heptathlon	Telma Eid; Søndre Land IL	5093 pts	Elise Hoel Ulseth; IL Norodd	5027 pts	Not awarded	

== Referanser ==
Results

- NM Bergen 2020
