= 2019 Bislett Games =

- Dates: 13 June 2019
- Host city: Oslo, Norway
- Venue: Bislett Stadium
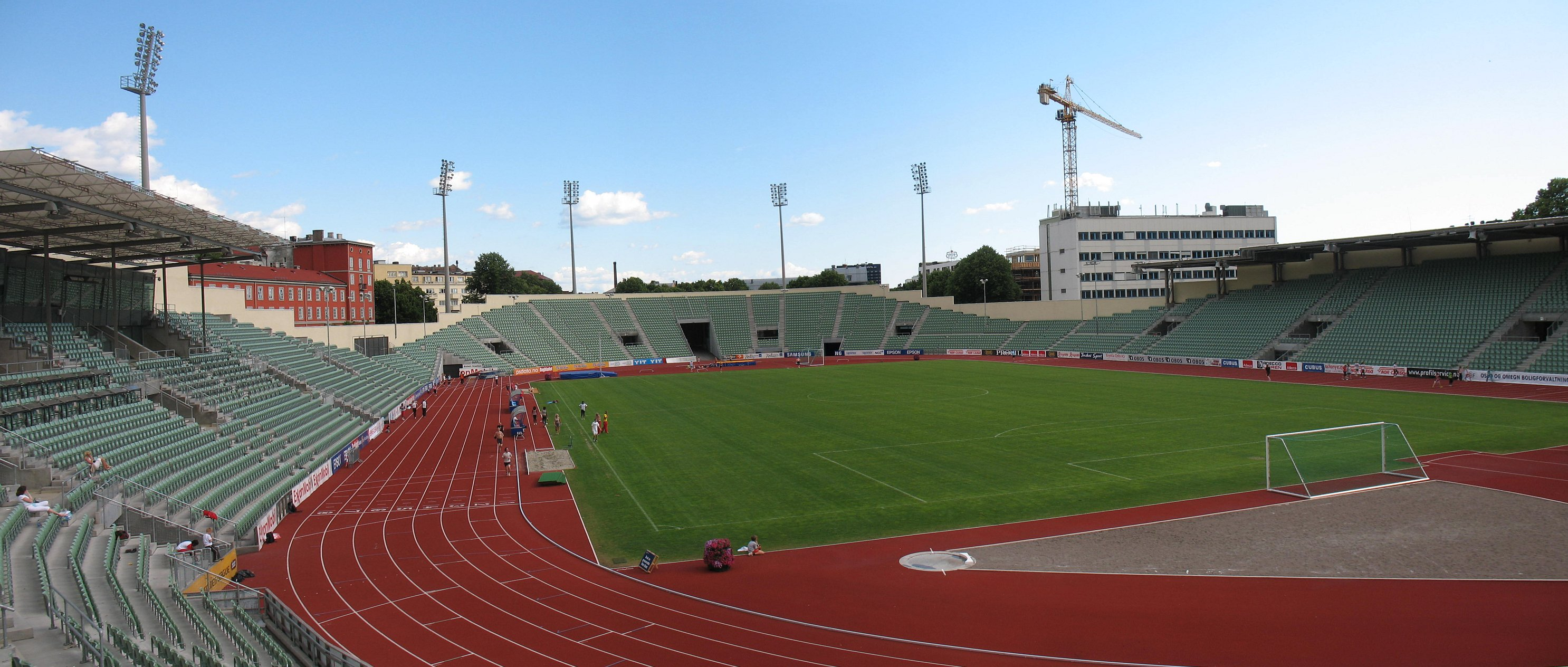
- Level: 2019 IAAF Diamond League
- Events: 29 (13 Diamond League)

The 2019 Bislett Games was the 55th edition of the annual outdoor track and field meeting in Oslo, Norway. Held on 13 June at Bislett Stadium, it was the fifth leg of the 2019 IAAF Diamond League – the highest level international track and field circuit. 29 events were contested with 13 of them being point-scoring Diamond League disciplines.

Local favorite Karsten Warholm, running in the men's 400 metres hurdles, won in a new European record time of 47.33 seconds, improving on the previous European record of 47.37 seconds that was set by Stéphane Diagana for France in 1995. Warholm had already been the Norwegian record holder with a time 47.64 seconds. He also improved on the meeting record of 47.60 seconds, previously set by Abderrahman Samba for Qatar in the 2018 edition.

In other men's events, Christian Coleman improved on the 100 metres world lead that he shared with fellow American Noah Lyles and Nigeria's Divine Oduduru by 0.01 seconds to 9.85 seconds. A Polish record and world lead was set by Marcin Lewandowski in the mile race, passing Kenyan Vincent Kibet on the home straight to win in 3:52.34, four hundredths ahead of Kibet. Selemon Barega also set a world lead and personal best in the 3000 metres race with a time of 7:32.17 seconds to win ahead of Joshua Cheptegei and Nicholas Kimeli, who finished second and third also with personal bests of 7:33.26 and 7:34.85 respectively. Henrik Ingebrigtsen finished fourth with a Norwegian record with a time of 7:36.85.

Sam Kendricks took his third Diamond League win for the season in the men's pole vault with a mark of 5.91 metres, with world leader Mondo Duplantis settling for fourth behind second place Piotr Lisek and third place Cole Walsh, with all three below Kendricks sharing a final mark of 5.81 metres.

In the women's 3000 metres steeplechase, Norah Jeruto defeated world record holder Beatrice Chepkoech and 2017 world champion Emma Coburn, winning in a world leading and meeting record time of 9:03.71. Chepkoech, who hadn't lost since May 2018, finished second in 9:04.30 with Coburn in fourth behind Hyvin Jepkemoi. Though they did not finish in the top eight, national records were set by Maruša Mišmaš for Slovenia and Anna Emilie Møller for Denmark, with times of 9:20.97 and 9:24.21 respectively.

Two other world leads were set by the women in the high jump and the triple jump. Mariya Lasitskene leaped the first over two meters mark for the 2019 season in the high jump, winning her 20th Diamond League meet in her career at 2.01 metres. Caterine Ibargüen took the world lead in the triple jump with a mark of 14.79 metres.

In her Diamond League debut in the women's 400 metres hurdles, Sydney McLaughlin passed 2016 Olympic champion and world leader Dalilah Muhammad after the final hurdle to win in 54.16 seconds to Muhammad's 54.35 seconds.

== Diamond League results ==
Athletes competing in the Diamond League disciplines earned extra compensation and points which went towards qualifying for one of two Diamond League finals (either Zürich or Brussels depending on the discipline). First place earned eight points, with each step down in place earning one less point than the previous, until no points are awarded in ninth place or lower.

=== Men ===
100 m (−0.9 m/s)
Place	Athlete	Time	Points
1	Christian Coleman (USA)	9.85 WL	15 (+8)
2	Xie Zhenye (CHN)	10.01	10 (+7)
3	Mike Rodgers (USA)	10.04	7 (+6)
4	Filippo Tortu (ITA)	10.10	5 (+5)
5	Yuki Koike (JPN)	10.15	4 (+4)
6	Chijindu Ujah (GBR)	10.18	3 (+3)
7	Tommy Ramdhan (GBR)	10.28	2 (+2)
8	Reece Prescod (GBR)	10.76	6 (+1)

Mile
Place	Athlete	Time	Points
1	Marcin Lewandowski (POL)	3:52.34 WL NR	8 (+8)
2	Vincent Kibet (KEN)	3:52.38	12 (+7)
3	Ayanleh Souleiman (DJI)	3:52.66	13 (+6)
4	John Gregorek (USA)	3:52.94 PB	5 (+5)
5	Clayton Murphy (USA)	3:52.97	4 (+4)
6	Jakob Ingebrigtsen (NOR)	3:53.04	(9 +3)
7	Ryan Gregson (AUS)	3:53.51	2 (+2)
8	Kalle Berglund (SWE)	3:53.83 NR	1 (+1)
9	Filip Ingebrigtsen (NOR)	3:54.41	0
10	Bethwell Birgen (KEN)	3:54.92	11
11	Ismael Debjani (BEL)	3:57.37	0
12	Justus Soget (KEN)	3:57.90	0
13	Aman Wote (ETH)	3:59.37	2
DNF (PM)	Harun Abda (KEN)	Did not finish (pace maker)	0
DNF (PM)	Jordan Williamsz (AUS)	Did not finish (pace maker)	0

3000 m
Place	Athlete	Time	Points
1	Selemon Barega (ETH)	7:32.17 WL PB	22 (+8)
2	Joshua Cheptegei (UGA)	7:33.26 PB	9 (+7)
3	Nicholas Kipkorir Kimeli (KEN)	7:34.85 PB	9 (+6)
4	Henrik Ingebrigtsen (NOR)	7:36.85 NR	5 (+5)
5	Birhanu Balew (BHR)	7:37.37	14 (+4)
6	Stewart McSweyn (AUS)	7:38.22	3 (+3)
7	Drew Hunter (USA)	7:39.85 PB	2 (+2)
8	Ben True (USA)	7:40.49	1 (+1)
9	Davis Kiplangat (KEN)	7:42.20	0
10	Andrew Butchart (GBR)	7:43.57	1
11	Muktar Edris (ETH)	7:45.35	0
12	Matthew Ramsden (AUS)	7:45.68 PB	0
13	Milkesa Mengesha (ETH)	7:49.23 PB	0
14	Paul Kipngetich Tanui (KEN)	7:55.77	0
DNF (PM)	Cornelius Kangogo (KEN)	Did not finish (pace maker)	0
DNF (PM)	Paul Robinson (IRL)	Did not finish (pace maker)	0
DNS	Hagos Gebrhiwet (ETH)	Did not start	12

400 m hurdles
Place	Athlete	Time	Points
1	Karsten Warholm (NOR)	47.33 AR MR	16 (+8)
2	Thomas Barr (IRL)	49.11	19 (+7)
3	Kyron McMaster (IVB)	49.12	6 (+6)
4	David Kendziera (USA)	49.27	5 (+5)
5	Takatoshi Abe (JPN)	49.78	7 (+4)
6	Patryk Dobek (POL)	49.80	8 (+3)
7	TJ Holmes (USA)	50.60	9 (+2)

Pole vault
Place	Athlete	Mark	Points
1	Sam Kendricks (USA)	5.91 m	24 (+8)
2	Piotr Lisek (POL)	5.81 m	19 (+7)
3	Cole Walsh (USA)	5.81 m PB	6 (+6)
4	Mondo Duplantis (SWE)	5.81 m	5 (+5)
5	Paweł Wojciechowski (POL)	5.71 m	8 (+4)
6	Seito Yamamoto (JPN)	5.61 m	15 (+3)
7	Sondre Guttormsen (NOR)	5.61 m	2 (+2)
8	Alioune Sene (FRA)	5.51 m	1 (+1)

Javelin throw
Place	Athlete	Mark	Points
1	Johannes Vetter (GER)	85.27 m	8 (+8)
2	Magnus Kirt (EST)	84.74 m	7 (+7)
3	Cheng Chao-tsun (TPE)	84.30 m	13 (+6)
4	Andreas Hofmann (GER)	82.92 m	13 (+5)
5	Jakub Vadlejch (CZE)	82.73 m	7 (+4)
6	Thomas Röhler (GER)	82.63 m	8 (+3)
7	Bernhard Seifert (GER)	82.33 m	2 (+2)
8	Shivpal Singh (IND)	80.87 m	1 (+1)
9	Marcin Krukowski (POL)	78.19 m	6

=== Women ===
200 m (−0.7 m/s)
Place	Athlete	Time	Points
1	Dafne Schippers (NED)	22.56	14 (+8)
2	Crystal Emmanuel (CAN)	22.89	10 (+7)
3	Jenna Prandini (USA)	23.10	10 (+6)
4	Gabrielle Thomas (USA)	23.11	5 (+5)
5	Jamile Samuel (NED)	23.21	13 (+4)
6	Kyra Jefferson (USA)	23.23	8 (+3)
7	Vitória Cristina Rosa (BRA)	23.26	2 (+2)
8	Helene Rønningen (NOR)	24.16	1 (+1)

100 m hurdles (+1.1 m/s)
Place	Athlete	Time	Points
1	Christina Clemons (USA)	12.69	13 (+8)
2	Sharika Nelvis (USA)	12.74	20 (+7)
3	Elvira Herman (BLR)	12.84	13 (+6)
4	Cindy Roleder (GER)	12.93	10 (+5)
5	Nadine Visser (NED)	13.00	5 (+4)
6	Isabelle Pedersen (NOR)	13.08	3 (+3)
7	Nooralotta Neziri (FIN)	13.18	2 (+2)
DQ	Brianna McNeal (USA)	False start	2

400 m hurdles
Place	Athlete	Time	Points
1	Sydney McLaughlin (USA)	54.16	8 (+8)
2	Dalilah Muhammad (USA)	54.35	23 (+7)
3	Shamier Little (USA)	54.92	13 (+6)
4	Kori Carter (USA)	55.67	10 (+5)
5	Amalie Iuel (NOR)	55.80	4 (+4)
6	Anna Ryzhykova (UKR)	56.26	12 (+3)
7	Léa Sprunger (SUI)	56.46	2 (+2)
8	Meghan Beesley (GBR)	57.13	4 (+1)

3000 m steeple
Place	Athlete	Time	Points
1	Norah Jeruto (KEN)	9:03.71 WL MR	8 (+8)
2	Beatrice Chepkoech (KEN)	9:04.30	15 (+7)
3	Hyvin Jepkemoi (KEN)	9:07.56	6 (+6)
4	Emma Coburn (USA)	9:08.42	5 (+5)
5	Daisy Jepkemei (KEN)	9:10.54 PB	4 (+4)
6	Celliphine Chespol (KEN)	9:15.04	10 (+3)
7	Peruth Chemutai (UGA)	9:16.72	8 (+2)
8	Gesa Felicitas Krause (GER)	9:20.31	1 (+1)
9	Maruša Mišmaš (SLO)	9:20.97 NR	3
10	Winfred Mutile Yavi (BHR)	9:21.36	5
11	Anna Emilie Møller (DEN)	9:24.21 NR	0
12	Karoline Bjerkeli Grøvdal (NOR)	9:28.99	0
13	Mel Lawrence (USA)	9:29.81 PB	0
14	Rosie Clarke (GBR)	9:31.68 PB	0
15	Viktória Wagner-Gyürkés (HUN)	9:34.56 PB	0
DNF (PM)	Fancy Cherono (KEN)	Did not finish (pace maker)	1
DNF (PM)	Caroline Tuigong (KEN)	Did not finish (pace maker)	0

High jump
Place	Athlete	Mark	Points
1	Mariya Lasitskene (RUS)	2.01 m WL	16 (+8)
2	Erika Kinsey (SWE)	1.96 m	20 (+7)
3	Mirela Demireva (BUL)	1.94 m	17 (+6)
4	Karyna Taranda (BLR)	1.94 m	5 (+5)
5	Iryna Herashchenko (UKR)	1.94 m	4 (+4)
6	Yuliya Levchenko (UKR)	1.94 m	10 (+3)
7	Tonje Angelsen (NOR)	1.88 m	2 (+2)
8	Morgan Lake (GBR)	1.85 m	1 (+1)
9	Yaroslava Mahuchikh (UKR)	1.85 m	13

Triple jump
Place	Athlete	Mark	Points
1	Caterine Ibargüen (COL)	14.79 m (−0.2 m/s) WL	8 (+8)
2	Keturah Orji (USA)	14.53 m (+1.2 m/s)	7 (+7)
3	Shanieka Ricketts (JAM)	14.41 m (+1.5 m/s)	6 (+6)
4	Kimberly Williams (JAM)	14.36 m (+1.4 m/s)	5 (+5)
5	Paraskevi Papachristou (GRE)	14.34 m (+0.8 m/s)	4 (+4)
6	Olha Saladukha (UKR)	14.30 m (+0.8 m/s)	3 (+3)
7	Patrícia Mamona (POR)	14.09 m (+1.3 m/s)	2 (+2)
8	Kristin Gierisch (GER)	13.71 m (+0.8 m/s)	1 (+1)
9	Tori Franklin (USA)	13.68 m (+0.7 m/s)	0
10	Rouguy Diallo (FRA)	11.85 m (+1.4 m/s)	0

Shot put
Place	Athlete	Mark	Points
1	Gong Lijiao (CHN)	19.51 m	15 (+8)
2	Chase Ealey (USA)	19.20 m	15 (+7)
3	Fanny Roos (SWE)	18.75 m	8 (+6)
4	Danniel Thomas-Dodd (JAM)	18.67 m	9 (+5)
5	Christina Schwanitz (GER)	18.48 m	4 (+4)
6	Aliona Dubitskaya (BLR)	18.41 m	9 (+3)
7	Jessica Ramsey (USA)	18.39 m	7 (+2)
8	Michelle Carter (USA)	18.28 m	1 (+1)
9	Paulina Guba (POL)	17.79 m	1
10	Maggie Ewen (USA)	17.30 m	3

== Other international results ==
Event	First		Second		Third	
Men's 800 m	Ryan Sánchez (PUR)	1:46.34	Cornelius Tuwei (KEN)	1:46.52	Michał Rozmys (POL)	1:46.71
Women's 800 m	Halimah Nakaayi (UGA)	2:01.93	Selina Büchel (SUI)	2:02.32	Diribe Welteji (ETH)	2:02.85
Women's javelin throw	Kathryn Mitchell (AUS)	56.07 m	Ane Dahlen (NOR)	52.79 m	Maria Børstad Jensen (NOR)	51.27 m

== Norwegian national results ==
=== Men ===
Event	First		Second		Third	
100 m (+1.8 m/s)	Salum Ageze Kashafali	10.45 PB	Even Meinseth	10.61	Christian Mensah	10.74
200 m (+1.3 m/s)	Mathias Hove Johansen	21.12	Andreas Haara Bakketun	21.36	Filip Bøe	21.38
400 m	Luca Thompson	47.97	Simen Sigurdsen	48.11	Gustav Lundholm Nielsen (DEN)	48.16
1500 m	Jacob Boutera	3:42.75	Andreas Lindgreen (DEN)	3:43.27	Marius Vedvik	3:44.04 PB
Age 14–15 800 m	Benjamin Olsen	2:04.33	Halvard Grape Fladby	2:04.68	Simen Gløgård Stensrud	2:07.51

=== Women ===
Event	First		Second		Third	
100 m (−0.3 m/s)	Helene Rønningen	11.65	Ingvild Meinseth	11.85	Astrid Mangen Ingebrigtsen	11.87
400 m	Naomi Van den Broeck (BEL)	54.48 PB	Sara Dorthea Jensen	54.83	Kaitesi Ertzgaard	55.60
1500 m	Mina Anglero	4:23.80	Malin Edland	4:24.34 PB	Sanne Njaastad	4:25.43
400 m hurdles	Hanna Palmqvist (SWE)	57.91 PB	Elisabeth Slettum	58.72	Andrea Rooth	58.83 PB
Under-18 100 m hurdles	Mia Guldteig Lien	13.88	Vilde Marstein	13.98	Elea Jørstad Block	14.18
Age 14–15 800 m	Malin Hoelsveen	2:13.59	Sunniva Fjeld	2:16.99	Filippa Bertelsen Fadnes	2:18.00

=== Mixed ===
Event	First		Second		Third	
Long jump	Ingar Kiplesund	7.77 m (+0.6 m/s)	Amund Høie Sjursen	7.47 m (+1.1 m/s)	Benjamin Gabrielsen (DEN)	7.28 m (+1.2 m/s)
Under-18 4×200 m relay	Tønsberg FIK (NOR): Mathea Wego Karlsen; Tobias Slettingdalen Johansen; Claudia Maria Foss; Sebastian Berntsen	1:45.49	IFK Göteborg 1 (SWE): Isabelle Rydén; Albin Edin; Ivana Pekic; Hugo Kündig	1:46.94	Tyrving 1 (NOR): Hannah de Younge; Sindre Axelsen; Aiselin Feliot; Kristian Drabløs	1:49.27

== See also ==
- 2019 Weltklasse Zürich (first half of the Diamond League final)
- 2019 Memorial Van Damme (second half of the Diamond League final)
