= 2018 Bislett Games =

- Dates: 7 June 2018
- Host city: Oslo, Norway
- Venue: Bislett Stadium
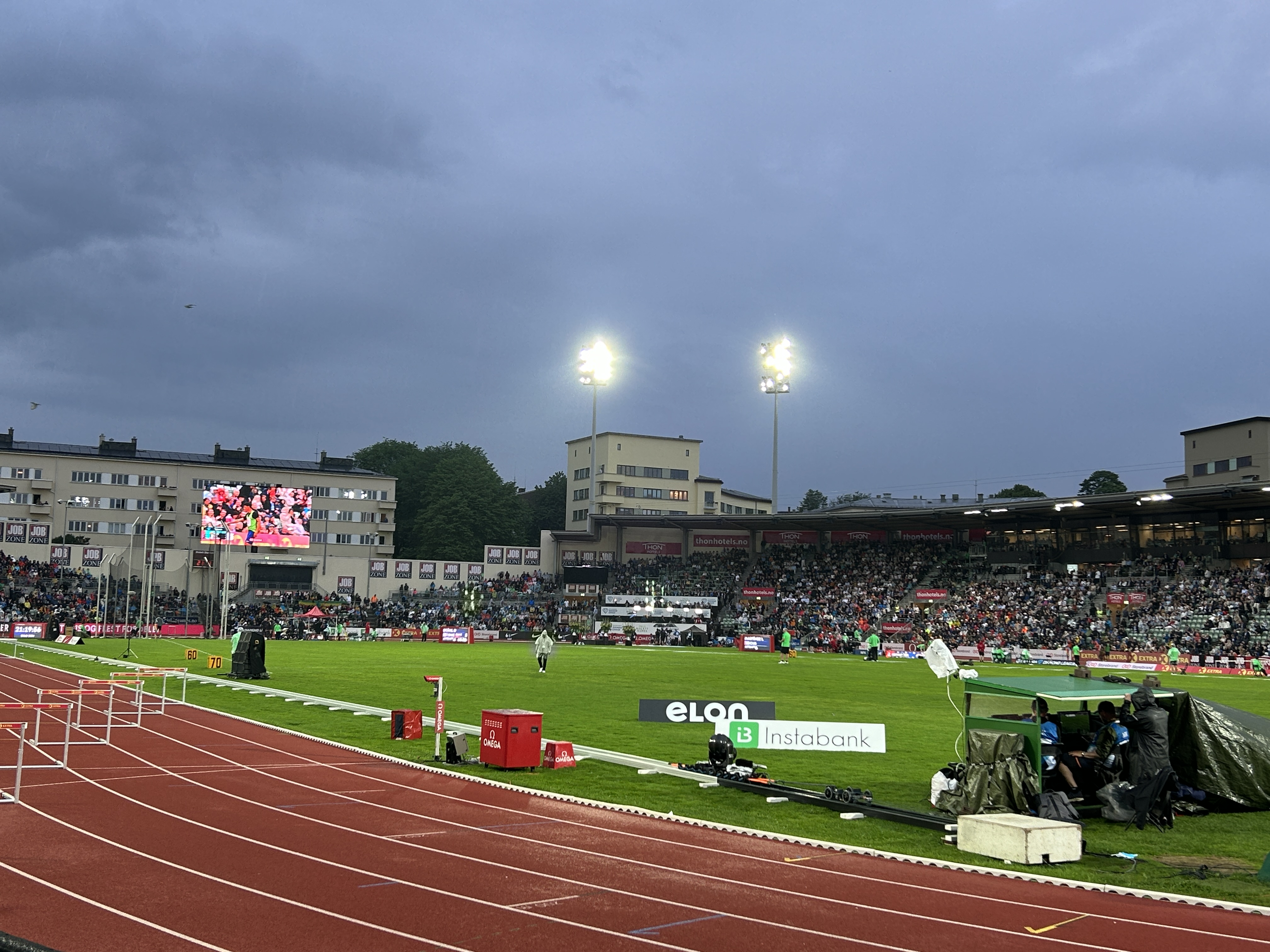
- Level: 2018 Diamond League

The 2018 Bislett Games was the 54th edition of the annual outdoor track and field meeting in Oslo, Norway. Held on 7 June at Bislett Stadium, it was the fourth leg of the 2018 Diamond League – the highest level international track and field circuit.

== Diamond discipline results ==
Athletes competing in the Diamond League disciplines earned extra compensation and points which went towards qualifying for the Diamond League finals in Zürich and Brussels. First place earned 8 points, with each step down in place earning one less point than the previous, until no points are awarded in 9th place or lower. In the case of a tie, each tying athlete earns the full amount of points for the place.

=== Men's ===
200 metres
Rank	Athlete	Nation	Time	Points	Notes
1st place, gold medalist(s)	Ramil Guliyev	Turkey	19.90	8	SB
2nd place, silver medalist(s)	Aaron Brown	Canada	19.98	7	PB
3rd place, bronze medalist(s)	Jereem Richards	Trinidad and Tobago	20.19	6	
4	Adam Gemili	Great Britain	20.21	5	SB
5	Ameer Webb	United States	20.45	4	SB
6	Jonathan Quarcoo	Norway	20.79	3	
7	Churandy Martina	Netherlands	20.86	2	
—	Dedric Dukes	United States	DQ		R 163.3a
			Wind: (+1.0 m/s)		

Mile
Rank	Athlete	Nation	Time	Points	Notes
1st place, gold medalist(s)	Elijah Manangoi	Kenya	3:56.95	8	
2nd place, silver medalist(s)	~~Sadik Mikhou~~	~~Bahrain~~	~~3:57.92~~	~~7~~	DQ (Note: Due to doping violations Mikhou's results from this competition were disqualified.)
3rd place, bronze medalist(s)	Taresa Tolosa	Ethiopia	3:57.97	6	
4	Filip Ingebrigtsen	Norway	3:58.00	5	
5	Younès Essalhi	Morocco	3:58.46	4	
6	Henrik Ingebrigtsen	Norway	3:58.47	3	SB
7	Ryan Gregson	Australia	3:59.10	2	
8	Bethwell Birgen	Kenya	3:59.15	2	
9	Jake Wightman	Great Britain	3:59.20	2	
10	Kumari Taki	Kenya	3:59.87	2	
11	Thiago André	Brazil	20.86	2	
—	Jamie Webb	Great Britain	DNF		PM

400 metres hurdles
Rank	Athlete	Nation	Time	Points	Notes
1st place, gold medalist(s)	Abderrahman Samba	Qatar	47.60	8	MR
2nd place, silver medalist(s)	Karsten Warholm	Norway	48.22	7	
3rd place, bronze medalist(s)	Yasmani Copello	Turkey	48.54	6	
4	TJ Holmes	United States	48.64	5	SB
5	Kerron Clement	United States	49.30	4	SB
6	Rasmus Mägi	Estonia	49.35	3	
7	Mamadou Kassé Hann	France	49.50	2	SB
8	Thomas Barr	Ireland	49.53	1	SB

High jump
Rank	Athlete	Nation	Height	Points	Notes
1st place, gold medalist(s)	Mutaz Barsham	Qatar	2.36 m	8	
2nd place, silver medalist(s)	Danil Lysenko	Authorised Neutral Athletes	2.33 m	7	SB
3rd place, bronze medalist(s)	Donald Thomas	Bahamas	2.25 m	6	
4	Majd Eddin Ghazal	Syria	2.25 m	5	
5	Marco Fassinotti	Italy	2.25 m	4	SB
6	Dzmitry Nabokau	Belarus	2.20 m	3	
6	Brandon Starc	Australia	2.20 m	3	
6	Fabian Delryd	Sweden	2.20 m	3	

Shot put
Rank	Athlete	Nation	Distance	Points	Notes
1st place, gold medalist(s)	Tom Walsh	New Zealand	22.29 m	8	MR
2nd place, silver medalist(s)	Ryan Crouser	United States	22.21 m	7	
3rd place, bronze medalist(s)	Darrell Hill	United States	21.20 m	6	
4	David Storl	Germany	20.97 m	5	
5	Tomáš Staněk	Czech Republic	20.82 m	4	SB
6	Ryan Whiting	United States	20.25 m	3	
7	Joe Kovacs	United States	20.13 m	2	
8	Marcus Thomsen	Norway	19.41 m	1	
9	Stipe Žunić	Croatia	19.17 m		

Discus throw
Rank	Athlete	Nation	Distance	Points	Notes
1st place, gold medalist(s)	Andrius Gudžius	Lithuania	69.04 m	8	
2nd place, silver medalist(s)	Ehsan Haddadi	Iran	67.55 m	7	
3rd place, bronze medalist(s)	Daniel Ståhl	Sweden	67.04 m	6	
4	Christoph Harting	Germany	65.68 m	5	
5	Mason Finley	United States	65.16 m	4	SB
6	Philip Milanov	Belgium	64.40 m	3	
7	Daniel Jasinski	Germany	63.94 m	2	
8	Fedrick Dacres	Jamaica	63.85 m	1	
9	Ola Stunes Isene	Norway	62.01 m		
10	Sven Martin Skagestad	Norway	59.48 m		

=== Women's ===
100 metres
Rank	Athlete	Nation	Time	Points	Notes
1st place, gold medalist(s)	Murielle Ahouré-Demps	Ivory Coast	10.91	8	
2nd place, silver medalist(s)	Dina Asher-Smith	Great Britain	10.92	7	NR, PB
3rd place, bronze medalist(s)	Michelle-Lee Ahye	Trinidad and Tobago	11.06	6	SB
4	Blessing Okagbare	Nigeria	11.12	5	
5	Gina Lückenkemper	Germany	11.16	4	SB
6	Carina Horn	South Africa	11.22	3	
7	Ezinne Okparaebo	Norway	11.24	2	SB
8	Khalifa St. Fort	Trinidad and Tobago	11.28	1	SB
			Wind: (+1.6 m/s)		

400 metres
Rank	Athlete	Nation	Time	Points	Notes
1st place, gold medalist(s)	Salwa Eid Naser	Bahrain	49.98	8	SB
2nd place, silver medalist(s)	Phyllis Francis	United States	50.47	7	SB
3rd place, bronze medalist(s)	Shakima Wimbley	United States	50.53	6	
4	Jessica Beard	United States	50.57	5	
5	Jaide Stepter Baynes	United States	50.78	4	
6	Courtney Okolo	United States	51.22	3	SB
7	Anyika Onuora	Great Britain	51.60	2	SB
8	Floria Gueï	France	51.84	1	SB

800 metres
Rank	Athlete	Nation	Time	Points	Notes
1st place, gold medalist(s)	Caster Semenya	South Africa	1:57.25	8	
2nd place, silver medalist(s)	Francine Niyonsaba	Burundi	1:58.57	7	
3rd place, bronze medalist(s)	Habitam Alemu	Ethiopia	1:58.58	6	
4	Nelly Jepkosgei	Bahrain	1:58.96	5	PB
5	Laura Muir	Great Britain	1:59.09	4	
6	Brenda Martinez	United States	2:00.74	3	SB
7	Selina Rutz-Büchel	Switzerland	2:00.78	2	SB
8	Hedda Hynne	Norway	2:01.46	1	SB
9	Yngvild Elvemo	Norway	2:01.65		PB
10	Lovisa Lindh	Sweden	2:02.49		
—	Olha Bibik	Ukraine	DNF		PM

400 metres hurdles
Rank	Athlete	Nation	Time	Points	Notes
1st place, gold medalist(s)	Dalilah Muhammad	United States	53.65	8	SB
2nd place, silver medalist(s)	Shamier Little	United States	53.94	7	SB
3rd place, bronze medalist(s)	Sage Watson	Canada	54.55	6	SB
4	Léa Sprunger	Switzerland	55.07	5	SB
5	Zuzana Hejnová	Czech Republic	55.16	4	SB
6	Amalie Iuel	Norway	55.26	3	NR, PB
7	Yadisleidy Pedroso	Italy	55.47	2	
8	Line Kloster	Norway	56.48	1	SB

3000 metres steeplechase
Rank	Athlete	Nation	Time	Points	Notes
1st place, gold medalist(s)	Hyvin Jepkemoi	Kenya	9:09.63	8	
2nd place, silver medalist(s)	Emma Coburn	United States	9:09.70	7	
3rd place, bronze medalist(s)	Daisy Jepkemei	Kenya	9:16.87	6	
4	Courtney Frerichs	United States	9:20.84	5	
5	Aisha Praught-Leer	Jamaica	9:23.33	4	
6	Winfred Yavi	Bahrain	9:27.76	3	
7	Karoline Bjerkeli Grøvdal	Norway	9:29.94	2	
8	Purity Cherotich Kirui	Kenya	9:39.23	1	
9	Rosie Clarke	Great Britain	9:42.80		
10	Birtukan Adamu	Ethiopia	9:58.48		
—	Ann Gathoni	Kenya	DNF		PM
—	Caroline Chepkurui	Kenya	DNF		PM

Pole vault
Rank	Athlete	Nation	Height	Points	Notes
1st place, gold medalist(s)	Sandi Morris	United States	4.81 m	8	
2nd place, silver medalist(s)	Anzhelika Sidorova	Authorised Neutral Athletes	4.71 m	7	SB
3rd place, bronze medalist(s)	Angelica Bengtsson	Sweden	4.61 m	6	
4	Katie Moon	United States	4.61 m	5	
5	Holly Bradshaw	Great Britain	4.51 m	4	
6	Yarisley Silva	Cuba	4.26 m	3	
7	Lene Retzius	Norway	4.26 m	2	
—	Katerina Stefanidi	Greece	NM		

Triple jump
Rank	Athlete	Nation	Distance	Points	Notes
1st place, gold medalist(s)	Caterine Ibargüen	Colombia	14.89 m (+2.5 m/s)	8	
2nd place, silver medalist(s)	Tori Franklin	United States	14.57 m (+0.2 m/s)	7	
3rd place, bronze medalist(s)	Kimberly Williams	Jamaica	14.50 m (−0.6 m/s)	6	
4	Shanieka Ricketts	Jamaica	14.44 m (+1.8 m/s)	5	
5	Kristin Gierisch	Germany	14.37 m (+1.4 m/s)	4	SB
6	Olga Rypakova	Kazakhstan	14.12 m (+2.1 m/s)	3	
7	Olha Saladukha	Ukraine	14.02 m (+0.4 m/s)	2	
8	Oda Utsi Onstad	Norway	13.23 m (+0.4 m/s)	1	
—	Paraskevi Papachristou	Greece	NM		
Best wind-legal performances
	Caterine Ibargüen	Colombia	14.83 m (+0.7 m/s)		
	Olga Rypakova	Kazakhstan	14.06 m (+1.8 m/s)		

Javelin throw
Rank	Athlete	Nation	Distance	Points	Notes
1st place, gold medalist(s)	Tatsiana Khaladovich	Belarus	67.47 m	8	NR, PB
2nd place, silver medalist(s)	Lü Huihui	China	65.11 m	7	
3rd place, bronze medalist(s)	Nikola Ogrodníková	Czech Republic	61.56 m	6	
4	Sigrid Borge	Norway	61.11 m	5	
5	Kara Winger	United States	60.79 m	4	
6	Madara Palameika	Latvia	59.26 m	3	
7	Christin Hussong	Germany	58.53 m	2	
8	Elizabeth Gleadle	Canada	55.93 m	1	
9	Kelsey-Lee Barber	Australia	54.61 m		

== Promotional events results ==
=== Men's ===
1500 metres
Rank	Athlete	Nation	Time	Notes
1st place, gold medalist(s)	Chris O'Hare	Great Britain	3:35.96	SB
2nd place, silver medalist(s)	Robby Andrews	United States	3:36.05	SB
3rd place, bronze medalist(s)	Jakob Ingebrigtsen	Norway	3:36.06	PB
4	Hicham Akankam	Morocco	3:36.94	PB
5	Patrick Casey	United States	3:37.06	SB
6	Fouad Elkaam	Morocco	3:37.14	SB
7	Kalle Berglund	Sweden	3:37.40	SB
8	Jordan Williamsz	Australia	3:38.21	SB
9	Jake Heyward	Great Britain	3:39.84	PB
10	Johan Rogestedt	Sweden	3:40.81	SB
11	Mohammed Tiouali	Bahrain	3:40.84	
12	Valentijn Weinans	Netherlands	3:45.17	
—	Dale King-Clutterbuck	Great Britain	DNF	PM
—	Bernard Koros	Kenya	DNF	PM

10,000 metres
Rank	Athlete	Nation	Time	Notes
1st place, gold medalist(s)	Dominic Kiptarus	Kenya	28:05.34	
2nd place, silver medalist(s)	Stewart McSweyn	Australia	28:05.37	PB
3rd place, bronze medalist(s)	Julien Wanders	Switzerland	28:07.15	
4	Zouhair Talbi	Morocco	28:31.73	
5	Sondre Nordstad Moen	Norway	28:37.92	
6	Marius Vedvik	Norway	29:13.27	
7	Weldu Negash Gebretsadik	Norway	29:21.23	PB
—	Eivind Øygard	Norway	DNF	
—	Arne Gabius	Germany	DNF	
—	David Nilsson	Sweden	DNF	
—	Per Svela	Norway	DNF	
—	Amanal Petros	Germany	DNF	
—	Daniele Meucci	Italy	DNF	
—	Andy Vernon	Great Britain	DNF	PM

=== Women's ===
100 metres hurdles
Rank	Athlete	Nation	Time	Notes
1st place, gold medalist(s)	Danielle Williams	Jamaica	12.60	SB
2nd place, silver medalist(s)	Alina Talay	Belarus	12.63	
3rd place, bronze medalist(s)	Queen Claye	United States	12.71	SB
4	Isabelle Pedersen	Norway	12.78	
5	Cindy Roleder	Germany	12.81	=SB
6	Eline Berings	Belgium	12.89	SB
7	Bridgette Owens	United States	12.98	
8	Jasmin Stowers	United States	12.99	
			Wind: (+1.1 m/s)	

== National events results ==
=== Men's ===
100 metres
Rank	Athlete	Nation	Time	Notes
1st place, gold medalist(s)	Pål Haugen Lillefosse	Norway	10.55	PB
2nd place, silver medalist(s)	Christian Marthinussen	Norway	10.66	SB
3rd place, bronze medalist(s)	Patrick Monga Bifuko	Democratic Republic of the Congo	10.78	PB
4	Filip Bøe	Norway	10.82	
5	Hallgeir Martinsen	Norway	10.84	SB
6	Riquelvis Rafael Santiago	Norway	10.92 [.915]	SB
7	Jostein Joshua Fossøy	Norway	10.92 [.920]	SB
8	Nils-Paul Skara	Norway	11.07	
			Wind: (+1.5 m/s)	

200 metres
Rank	Athlete	Nation	Time	Notes
1st place, gold medalist(s)	Mathias Hove Johansen	Norway	21.05	
2nd place, silver medalist(s)	Even Pettersen	Norway	21.22	SB
3rd place, bronze medalist(s)	Stephan Skogheim Kyeremeh	Norway	21.31	PB
4	Andreas Haara Bakketun	Norway	21.40	PB
5	Carl Emil Kåshagen	Norway	21.43	SB
6	Øyvind Strømmen Kjerpeset	Norway	21.49	
7	Øystein Klareng	Norway	21.57	PB
8	Jonatan Greni Bjerkaas	Norway	21.65	PB
			Wind: (+1.9 m/s)	

400 metres
Rank	Athlete	Nation	Time	Notes
1st place, gold medalist(s)	Simen Sigurdsen	Norway	47.32	PB
2nd place, silver medalist(s)	Mauritz Kåshagen	Norway	47.80	
3rd place, bronze medalist(s)	Mike Lubsen	Norway	47.93	
4	Tor Kringstad Vedde	Norway	48.07	
5	Luca Thompson	Norway	48.18	PB
6	Joachim Sandberg	Norway	48.58	
7	Torbjørn Lysne	Norway	48.72	SB
8	Henrik Semb	Norway	49.72	

800 metres
Rank	Athlete	Nation	Time	Notes
1st place, gold medalist(s)	Thomas Roth	Norway	1:45.75	PB
2nd place, silver medalist(s)	Zak Curran	Ireland	1:46.88	SB
3rd place, bronze medalist(s)	Markus Einan	Norway	1:48.40	
4	Didrik Hexeberg Warlo	Norway	1:50.88	PB
5	Sondre Dingsør Skogen	Norway	1:50.94	PB
6	Emil Oustad	Norway	1:51.08	SB
7	Abdurrahman Hir	Norway	1:51.88	
8	Terje Snarby	Norway	1:52.75	SB
9	Sigurd Tveit	Norway	1:56.50	
—	Andreas Roth	Norway	DNF	PM

1500 metres
Rank	Athlete	Nation	Time	Notes
1st place, gold medalist(s)	Andreas Lindgreen	Denmark	3:43.52	PB
2nd place, silver medalist(s)	Ferdinand Kvan Edman	Norway	3:46.39	
3rd place, bronze medalist(s)	Sondre Juven	Norway	3:48.95	
4	Tom Erling Kårbø	Norway	3:48.98	
5	Simen Halle Haugen	Norway	3:49.65	
6	Jacob Boutera	Norway	3:49.72	PB
7	Abduljaleel Mohamoud Ismail Hir	Norway	3:50.03	SB
8	Mats Hauge	Norway	3:50.07	SB
9	Sigurd Ruud Skjeseth	Norway	3:50.58	SB
10	Moa Abounnachat Bollerød	Norway	3:51.17	PB
11	Fredrik Sandvik	Norway	3:53.97	
12	Mateusz Dębski	Poland	3:57.56	
13	Magnus Hannevig Pettersen	Norway	4:04.21	
—	Håkon Mushom	Norway	DNF	PM

Men's Long Jump
Place	Athlete	Nation	Distance
1st place, gold medalist(s)	Benjamin Gabrielsen	Denmark	7.87 m (+1.5 m/s)
2nd place, silver medalist(s)	Sebastian Ree Pedersen	Denmark	7.52 m (+1.4 m/s)
3rd place, bronze medalist(s)	Ingar Bratseth-Kiplesund	Norway	7.42 m (+1.3 m/s)
4	Henrik Flåtnes	Norway	7.29 m (+2.4 m/s)
5	Marius Bull Hjeltnes	Norway	7.19 m (+3.6 m/s)
6	Brede Solberg Stølen	Norway	6.65 m (+0.1 m/s)
Best wind-legal performances
	Henrik Flåtnes	Norway	7.18 m (+0.3 m/s)
	Marius Bull Hjeltnes	Norway	7.15 m (+1.0 m/s)

=== Women's ===
100 metres
Rank	Athlete	Nation	Time	Notes
1st place, gold medalist(s)	Helene Rønningen	Norway	11.34	
2nd place, silver medalist(s)	Astrid Mangen Ingebrigtsen	Norway	11.72	
3rd place, bronze medalist(s)	Mari Gilde Brubak	Norway	11.95	
4	Nathalie Johnsen	Norway	11.96	
5	Liv Storhaug	Norway	11.99	
6	Vilde Aasmo	Norway	12.04	
7	Malin Bårdsgård Kulseth	Norway	12.05	
8	Kaitesi Ertzgaard	Norway	12.09	
			Wind: (+2.5 m/s)	

200 metres
Rank	Athlete	Nation	Time	Notes
1st place, gold medalist(s)	Helene Rønningen	Norway	23.27	NR, PB
2nd place, silver medalist(s)	Astrid Mangen Ingebrigtsen	Norway	23.56	PB
3rd place, bronze medalist(s)	Christine Bjelland Jensen	Norway	24.19	SB
4	Henriette Jæger	Norway	24.68	PB
5	Kaitesi Ertzgaard	Norway	24.71	PB
6	Marlén Aakre	Norway	24.83	PB
7	Malin Bårdsgård Kulseth	Norway	24.91	PB
			Wind: (+1.2 m/s)	

400 metres
Rank	Athlete	Nation	Time	Notes
1st place, gold medalist(s)	Lisa Duffy	Sweden	54.20	
2nd place, silver medalist(s)	Elisabeth Slettum	Norway	54.38	PB
3rd place, bronze medalist(s)	Marie Skjæggestad	Norway	55.44	
4	Nora Kollerød Wold	Norway	55.73	PB
5	Josefine Tomine Eriksen	Norway	55.78	SB
6	Frida Røe Tærum	Norway	55.94	
7	Mari Drabløs	Norway	56.00	SB
8	Erle Lyng	Norway	57.27	PB

800 metres
Rank	Athlete	Nation	Time	Notes
1st place, gold medalist(s)	Monika Elenska	Lithuania	2:04.44	
2nd place, silver medalist(s)	Amalie Sæten	Norway	2:04.80	PB
3rd place, bronze medalist(s)	Elisabeth Angell Bergh	Norway	2:07.63	PB
4	Mina Marie Anglero	Norway	2:08.00	
5	Sigrid Jervell Våg	Norway	2:08.12	PB
6	Sara Busic	Norway	2:11.24	
7	Sara Dorthea Jensen	Norway	2:12.18	
8	Vilde Våge Henriksen	Norway	2:13.25	SB
—	Sanne Njaastad	Norway	DNF	
—	Vår Åsheim	Norway	DNF	PM

100 metres hurdles
Rank	Athlete	Nation	Time	Notes
1st place, gold medalist(s)	Kristina Stensvoll Reppe	Norway	13.93	PB
2nd place, silver medalist(s)	Tonje Moen	Norway	13.95	PB
3rd place, bronze medalist(s)	Emilie Sandberg	Norway	14.53	
			Wind: (+1.4 m/s)	

Women's Long Jump
Place	Athlete	Nation	Distance
1st place, gold medalist(s)	Kristina Stensvoll Reppe	Norway	5.88 m (+1.0 m/s)
2nd place, silver medalist(s)	Mia Guldteig Lien	Norway	5.81 m (+1.7 m/s)
3rd place, bronze medalist(s)	Karoline Jæger	Norway	5.32 m (+0.8 m/s)

== U18 events results ==
=== Women's ===
100 metres hurdles (76.2cm)
Rank	Athlete	Nation	Time	Notes
1st place, gold medalist(s)	Maria Aaberg	Norway	13.93	PB
2nd place, silver medalist(s)	Elea Jørstad Bock	Norway	13.95	
3rd place, bronze medalist(s)	Juni Evensen	Norway	14.53	PB
4	Summer Thalya Steinsrud	Norway	14.53	
5	Iben Carnhed	Norway	14.53	PB
6	Kristine Løwe Stillerud	Norway	14.53	
—	Andrea Rooth	Norway	DQ	R 162.8
			Wind: (+0.9 m/s)	

== See also ==
- 2018 Diamond League
