= Mathias Hove Johansen =

Norwegian sprinter (born 1998)

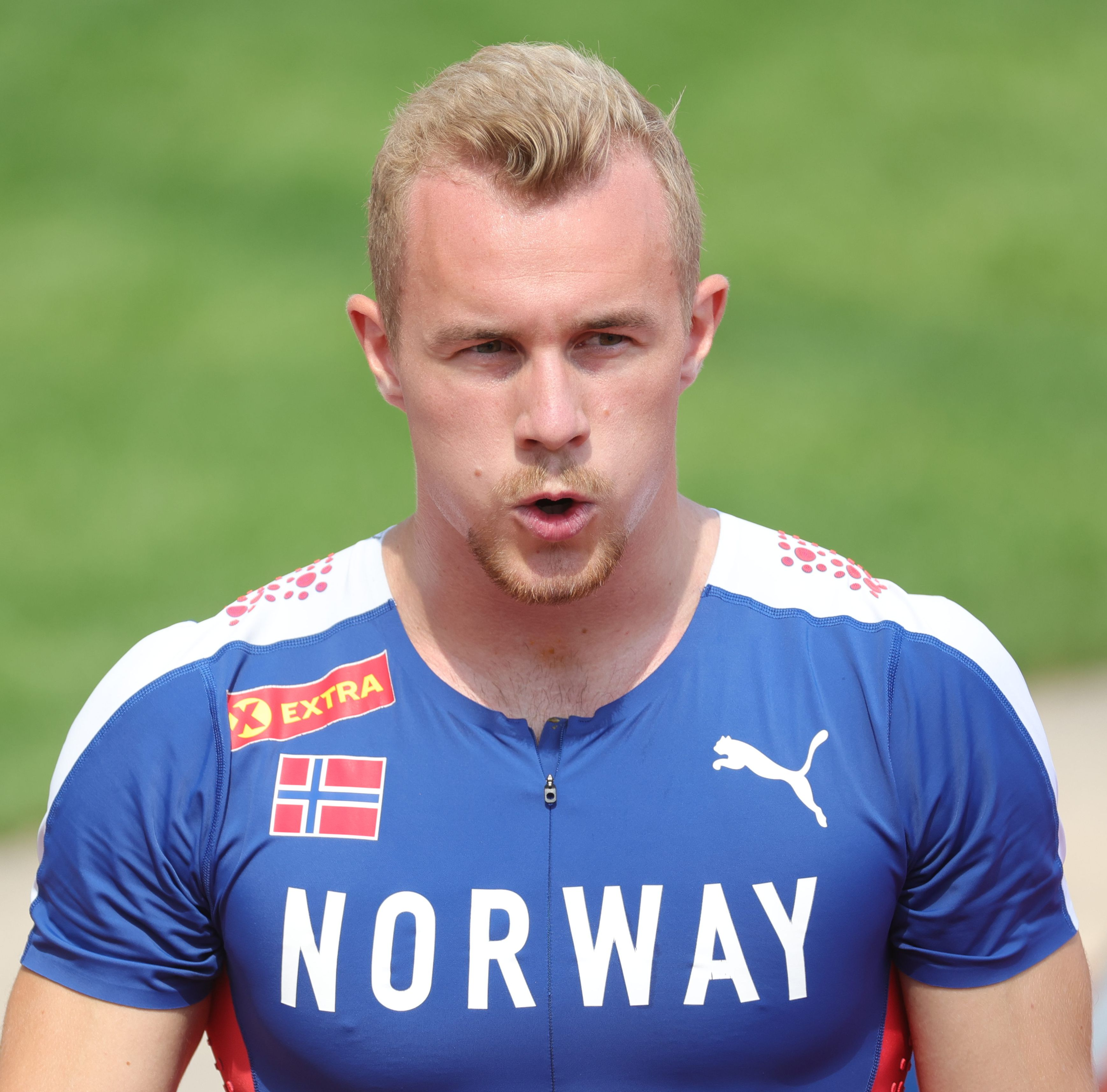
- Johansen at the 2022 European Athletics Championships

Personal information
- Nationality: Norway
- Born: 27 September 1998 (age 27)

Sport
- Sport: Athletics
- Events: 60 metres 200 metres

Achievements and titles
- National finals: 2015 Norwegian U18s; • 100m, 1st (gold); 2016 Norwegian Ind. U20s; • 60m, 1st (gold); • 200m, 1st (gold); 2016 Norwegian Champs; • 200m, 4th; 2016 Norwegian U20s; • 100m, 1st (gold); • 200m, 1st (gold); 2017 Norwegian Indoors; • 60m, 3rd (bronze); 2017 Norwegian Ind. U20s; • 60m, 1st (gold); • 200m, 1st (gold); 2017 Norwegian U20s; • 100m, 1st (gold); • 200m, 1st (gold); 2017 Norwegian Champs; • 100m, 2nd (silver); • 200m, 2nd (silver); 2017 Norwegian U20s; • 100m, 1st (gold); • 200m, 1st (gold); 2018 Norwegian Indoors; • 60m, 6th; • 200m, 1st (gold); 2018 Norwegian Champs; • 100m, 2nd (silver); • 200m, 2nd (silver); 2018 Norwegian U23s; • 100m, 2nd (silver); • 200m, 2nd (silver); 2019 Norwegian Champs; • 100m, 2nd (silver); • 200m, 1st (gold); 2019 Norwegian U23s; • 100m, 1st (gold); • 200m, 1st (gold); 2020 Norwegian Indoors; • 60m, 2nd (silver); • 200m, 1st (gold); 2020 Norwegian U23s; • 100m, 1st (gold); • 200m, 1st (gold); 2020 Norwegian Champs; • 100m, 2nd (silver); • 200m, 1st (gold); 2021 Norwegian Champs; • 100m, 4th; • 200m, 2nd (silver); 2022 Norwegian Indoors; • 60m, 3rd (bronze); • 200m, 1st (gold); 2022 Norwegian Champs; • 100m, 3rd (bronze); • 200m, 2nd (silver); 2023 Norwegian Champs; • 100m, 4th; • 200m, 2nd (silver)
- Personal bests: 60m: 6.73i (2021); 200m: 20.68 (-0.1) (2021)
Medal record
Men's athletics
Representing Norway
European Team Champs First Division
Bronze medal – third place	2017 Vaasa	4 × 100 m relay
- Updated on 14 December 2023

Mathias Hove Johansen (born 27 September 1998) is a Norwegian sprinter. He represents IL Skjalg, and was the 200 metres Norwegian Athletics Championships winner in 2019 and 2020.

He became the Nordic champion in the 200 metres indoors in 2019, and won the 200 metres at the Nordic–Baltic Under-23 Athletics Championships in 2018.

== Career ==
2013

Johansen finished 3rd in the 400 metres at the 2013 Veidekkelekene, and 4th in the 100 and 200 metres. At the 2013 Framolekene, he won silver in the 100 and 200 metres, and bronze in the 60 metres.

In September, he participated in the 2013 Norwegian Youth Athletics Championships, where he won bronze in the 200 metres in the U16 class. In the long jump, he finished 6th, and he came 4th in the 100 metres final.

2014

Outdoors, he participated in the Världsungdomsspelen, winning bronze in the 200 metres in the G16 class. He finished 8th in the long jump, and 4th in the 100 metres. He also competed in the 2014 Norwegian U20 Athletics Championships, one and a half months before turning 16. In the 100 metres, he was eliminated in the preliminary heats, with a time of 11.60, and in the 200 metres, he was eliminated in the semifinals, running 23.35. In September, he participated in the 2014 Norwegian U18 Athletics Championships, where he finished 3rd in the 100 metres and 5th in the 200 metres.

His fastest outdoor sprints that season were 11.43 in the 100 metres and 23.11 in the 200 metres.

2015

He won silver in the 100 metres at the Baerum Tyrvinglekene. At the 2015 Världsungdomsspelen, he finished 3rd in the 100 metres, and 4th in the 200 metres. In July, he represented Norway at the 2015 World U18 Championships in Athletics in Cali, Colombia. There, he ran 22.05 in the preliminary heats in the 200 metres but did not advance to the finals.

At the 2015 Norwegian Athletics Championships, he finished 5th in the 100 metres, with a time of 10.99, but was eliminated in the semifinals in the 200 metres. At the 2015 Norwegian U20 Athletics Championships two weeks later, he finished 6th in the 100 metres and 5th in the 200 metres in the MJ19 class with a new personal record of 22.00. He won both the 100 and 200 metres at the 2015 Norwegian U18 Athletics Championships. There, he set a personal record in the 100 metres with 10.94 seconds.

2016

At the 2016 Norwegian Indoor U18 Championships, he won the 60 metres in 7.06 and the 200 metres in 22.05. Both of these times were indoor personal bests. He participated in the 2016 Norwegian Indoor Athletics Championships in March. In the 200 metres, he won his preliminary heat, with a time of 22.62, but did not qualify for the final. In the 60 metres, he was eliminated in the semifinals, running 7.09. In the outdoor season, he participated in the National Events at the 2016 Bislett Games, finishing 2nd in the 200 metres. He improved his times to 10.62 in the 100 metres at the Veidekkelekene, and to 21.34 in the 200 metres at Tyrvinglekene in June. He won bronze in both the 100 and 200 metres at the 2016 Världsungdomsspelen, where he also qualified for the 2016 World U20 Championships in Athletics after running 21.31. At the World U20 Championships, held in Bydgoszcz, Poland, he posted a 0.3-second personal best in the 200 m of 21.00, despite a 1.2 m/s headwind. In the semifinals, he finished 4th in his heat, and did not advance to the final.

At the 2016 Norwegian Athletics Championships, he only participated in the 200 metres, and finished 4th in the final. At the 2016 Norwegian U20 Athletics Championships, he won both the 100 and 200 metres. He was selected to represent Norway at the 2016 Nordic U20 Championships in Reykjavík, where he won silver in the 200 metres and bronze in the 100 metres. He won the 100 metres at the 2016 Norwegian U18 Athletics Championships in Sandnes.

2017

During the 2017 Norwegian Indoor Athletics Championships, he won a bronze medal in the 60 metres, setting a personal record of 6.89 seconds in the final. At the 2017 Norwegian U20 Indoor Athletics Championships, he won the 60 and 200 metres, setting a personal record of 21.42 seconds in the 200 metres final.

He participated in the 2017 Norwegian Relay Championships, where he placed sixth in the 4 × 100 metres relay representing IL Skjalg. Norway competed in the First League (second-best division) at the 2017 European Athletics Team Championships, and Hove Johansen participated in the 4 × 100 metres relay, finishing third. Norway placed sixth overall in the team competition, maintaining their position in the First League. Johansen was selected to participate in the 2017 Nordic U20 Athletics Championships, winning silver in the 100 and 200 metres behind Henrik Larsson. He was also a member of the winning 4 × 100 metres relay team.

Hove Johansen won two silver medals at the 2017 Norwegian Athletics Championships, in both the 100 and 200 metres, losing only to Jonathan Quarcoo in both events. He improved his personal record in the 100 metres to 10.54 seconds in the final. At the 2017 Norwegian U20 Athletics Championships, he won the 100 and 200 metres. At the 2017 Norwegian U18 Athletics Championships, he won the 100 and 200 metres and was runner-up in the long jump with a new personal best of 6.71 metres.

2018

In the 2018 Norwegian Indoor Athletics Championships, Johansen won the 200 metres in a new personal best of 21.31 seconds, and placed fourth in the 60 metres. He competed in the 2018 Nordic Indoor Athletics Match, finishing 7th in the 200 metres.

At the 2018 Norwegian Relay Championships, Johansen contributed to IL Skjalg's 4 × 100 m victory in the men's and mixed categories. He won the National 200 metres at the 2018 Bislett Games. He won silver in the 200 metres at the 2018 Världsungdomsspelen, behind Henrik Larsson. In August, he participated in the 2018 Nordic-Baltic U23 Athletics Championships, winning gold in the 200 metres and the 4 × 100 metres relay. He won two silver medals at the 2018 Norwegian Athletics Championships, losing only to Jonathan Quarcoo in the 100 and 200 metres. That result was repeated at the 2018 Norwegian U20 Championships, where Quarcoo won the 100 and 200 metres ahead of Johansen.

2019

Johansen finished second in the 200 metres at the 2019 Karsten Warholm International. He did not reach the final in the 60 metres at the 2019 Norwegian Indoor Athletics Championships, but was selected to participate in the Nordic Indoor Athletics Match, where he won the 200 metres in a personal best of 21.27 seconds.

At the 2019 Norwegian Relay Championships, Johansen's IL Skjalg team swept the men's 4 × 100 m, men's 4 × 400 m, and mixed 4 × 100 m titles. He won the 200 metres in the national division at the Bislett Games, and at the 2019 European Athletics U23 Championships, he finished eighth in the 200 metres but was eliminated in the preliminary heats of the 100 metres. In August, he won the 200 metres at the 2019 Norwegian Athletics Championships, and he won silver in the 100 metres behind Salum Ageze Kashafali. He won the 100 and 200 metres at the 2019 Norwegian U23 Championships.

Norway competed in the First Division again at the 2019 European Athletics Team Championships, and Johansen finished seventh in the 200 metres, earning five points in the team competition. He also participated in Norway's 4 × 100 metres relay team, which finished 11th. Norway finished third place in the First Division, maintaining their league position.

2020

Johansen won the 200 metres at the 2020 Norwegian Indoor Athletics Championships, and finished second in the 60 metres. He later set a personal best in the 60 metres with a time of 6.86 seconds. At the 2020 Nordic Indoor Athletics Match he won the 200 metres and finished eighth in the 60 metres. He also won the 200 metres at the 2020 Karsten Warholm International.

At the 2020 Bislett Games (also called the Impossible Games), Johansen finished second behind Salum Ageze Kashafali. On 1 August, he set a personal record in the 100 metres at the Kuortane Games in Finland, with a time of 10.43 seconds. He won the 100 metres and 200 metres at the 2020 U23 Norwegian Athletics Championships, and he took gold in the 200 metres and silver in the 100 metres at the 2020 Norwegian Athletics Championships.

2021

Hove Johansen participated in the 2021 European Athletics Indoor Championships, but was eliminated in the preliminary heats of the 60 metres. Outdoors, he broke the 21-second barrier for the first time in June 2021, running 20.98 at the Night of Highlights, and he improved his personal best to 20.86 the next day in Lillehammer. He won two silver medals at the 2021 Norwegian Relay Championships, where IL Skjalg finished second in both the men's and mixed 4 × 100 m relays.

He represented Norway in two events at the 2021 European Athletics Team Championships, where Norway participated in the First League again. In the 200 metres, he finished in fourth place, and in the 4 × 100 metres relay, Norway finished in fifth place.

== Statistics ==
=== Personal bests ===
Event	Mark	Place	Competition	Venue	Date
60 metres	6.73i	4h5	European Athletics Indoor Championships	Toruń, Poland	6 March 2021
200 metres	20.68 (-0.1 m/s)	1st place, gold medalist(s)	Norgeslekene	Jessheim, Norway	6 August 2021
