= Freidig =

Freidig may refer to:

- SK Freidig
- SK Freidig, merged to form Nordstrand IF in 1919
- Freidig, merged to form Jar IL in 1934
- Freidig, merged to form Tromsdalen UIL
- Freidig, old name of Briskeby FL which merged to form Hamarkameratene
- Freidig, old name of IL Tyrving
