= Christin Sørum =

Norwegian long-distance runner (born 1968)

Christin Sørum (born 12 January 1968) is a retired Norwegian long-distance runner who specialized in 3000 metres and cross-country running. She represented IL Skjalg.

In 3000 m she won a silver medal at the 1985 European Junior Championships, finished fifth at the 1986 World Junior Championships and fourteenth at the 1986 European Championships, having established a personal best time of 9:00.13 minutes in the heats of the latter competition. Her highest place from the IAAF World Cross Country Championships was a 21st place from 1986. In the team competition there she finished ninth, which was a repeat from 1985. Later she competed at the 1987, 1988 and 1989 World Cross Country Championships without the same amount of success.

== Personal bests ==
- 1500 metres - 4:13.88 min (1987)
- 3000 metres - 9:00.13 min (1986) - seventh among Norwegian 3000 m runners.
