= Nordic–Baltic Under-23 Athletics Championships =

International youth athletics competition

- Sport: under-23 athletics
- Founded: 1998
- Country: Denmark, Estonia, Finland, Iceland, Latvia, Lithuania, Sweden and Norway

The Nordic–Baltic Under-23 Athletics Championships (Norwegian: Nordisk-Baltisk U23-mesterskap i friidrett) is an annual outdoor combined track and field events competition for athletes under-20 from the Nordic countries (Denmark, Finland, Iceland, Norway, and Sweden) – and the Baltic states (Estonia, Latvia and Lithuania). It is typically held over two days in July or August in even-numbered years. Athletes must be 22 years of age or younger by December 31 of the year the championship is held. The hosting of the event is currently limited to the Nordic nations.

The competition was first held in 1998 as the Nordic Under-23 Athletics Championships, The organisers trialled the involvement of athletes from the Baltic states in 2008 and 2010 before making this a permanent arrangement and including them in the competition name.

== Events ==
The event programme includes six individual track running events, three obstacle events, four jumping events, four throwing events, and two relay events for each sex. Competing nations may enter three athletes per individual event, with the host nation being able to enter a further two wildcard athletes per event. Nations may enter only one team per relay event. Where the number of entries exceeds eight athletes in a track event, then multiple finals are held, with the results of each race being combined for the final placings.

Track running

- 100 metres, 200 metres, 400 metres, 800 metres, 1500 metres, 5000 metres

Obstacle events

- 100 metres hurdles (women only), 110 metres hurdles (men only), 400 metres hurdles, 3000 metres steeplechase

Jumping events

- Pole vault, high jump, long jump, triple jump

Throwing events

- Shot put, discus throw, javelin throw, hammer throw

Relay events

- 4 × 100 metres relay, 4 × 400 metres relay

== Editions ==
Ed.	Year	Dates	Country	Place
1	1998	18–19 July	Eurajoki	Finland
2	2000	29–30 July	Gothenburg	Sweden
–	2002	Cancelled		
3	2004	11–12 September	Fredrikstad	Norway
4	2006	19–20 August	Aarhus	Denmark
5	2008	6–7 September	Tampere	Finland
6	2010	4–5 September	Söderhamn	Sweden
7	2012	21–22 July	Jessheim	Norway
8	2014	26–27 July	Copenhagen	Denmark
9	2016	20–21 August	Espoo	Finland
10	2018	11–12 August	Gävle	Sweden

== See also ==
- European Athletics U23 Championships
- SELL Student Games
