= Salum Ageze Kashafali =

Norwegian Paralympic athlete (born 1993)

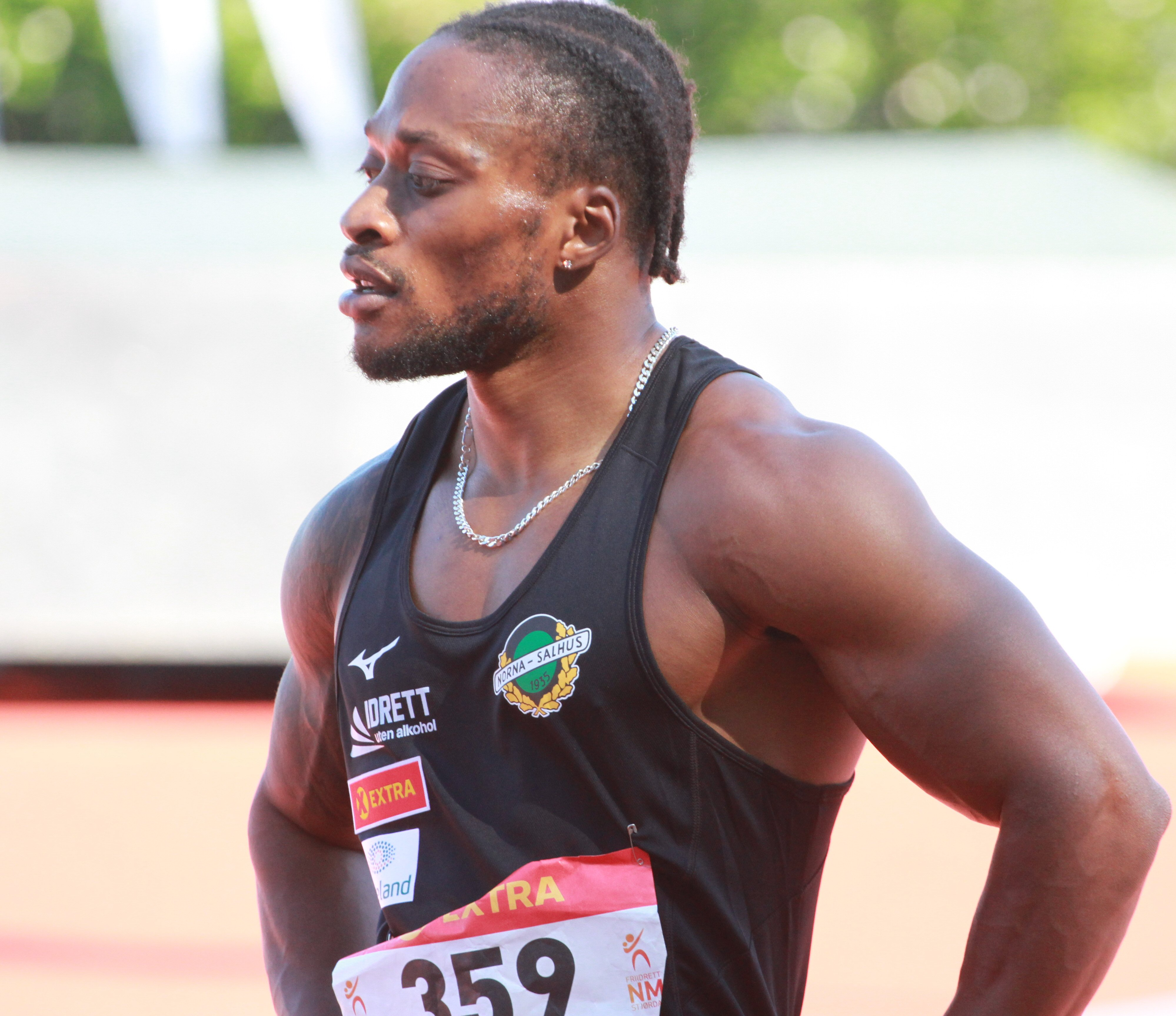
- Kashafali in 2022

Personal information
- Born: 25 November 1993 (age 32) Goma, Zaire

Sport
- Country: Norway
- Sport: Athletics; Para-athletics
- Disability: Vision impairment
- Disability class: T12
- Event: 100 metres
Medal record
Representing Norway
Men's para-athletics
Paralympic Games
Gold medal – first place	2020 Tokyo	100 m T12
Silver medal – second place	2024 Paris	100 m T13
World Championships
Gold medal – first place	2019 Dubai	100 m T12
Gold medal – first place	2023 Paris	100 m T13
Gold medal – first place	2025 New Delhi	100 m T12
Bronze medal – third place	2024 Kobe	100 m T13
European Championships
Gold medal – first place	2021 Bydgoszcz	100 m T12
Men's athletics
Norwegian Championships
Gold medal – first place	2019 Hamar	100 m

Salum Ageze Kashafali (born 25 November 1993) is a Norwegian Paralympic athlete who competes in the T12 classification of sprinting events. He is a Paralympic champion and silver medallist, two-time world champion and a European champion in the 100 metres. Kashafali won the gold medal in the men's 100 metres T12 event at the 2020 Summer Paralympics and the silver medal in the men's 100 metres T13 event at the 2024 Summer Paralympics.

Kashafali holds world records in the T12 and T13 classification of the 100 metres, with a time of 10.43 set at the 2020 Summer Paralympics and a time of 10.37 set at the Bislett Games in 2023 respectively. The latter record makes him the fastest Paralympian in the 100 metres event in history, regardless of disability.

Kashafali is visually impaired as a result of Stargardt disease.

== Career ==
In 2019, Kashafali competed both in able-bodied and para-athletic competitions. In June 2019, he set a new world record of 10.45s in the 100 metres T12 event at the Bislett Games held in Oslo, Norway. In August 2019, at the 2019 Norwegian Athletics Championships, he won the gold medal in the men's 100 metres with a time of 10.37s.

At the 2019 World Para Athletics Championships held in Dubai, United Arab Emirates, Kashafali won the gold medal in the men's 100 metres T12 event with a time of 10.54s. This meant that he qualified to represent Norway at the 2020 Summer Paralympics held in Tokyo, Japan.

In 2021, Kashafali won the gold medal in the men's 100 metres T12 event at the 2021 World Para Athletics European Championships held in Bydgoszcz, Poland.

== Personal life ==
Kashafali was born in Goma on November 25, 1993. When a civil war broke out in Congo, Kashafali and his family fled the country and ended up in a refugee camp. The family came to Norway in 2003 and lived a brief period in Vadsø before settling in Bergen.

== Achievements ==
=== Athletics ===
Year	Competition	Venue	Position	Event	Notes
2019	Bislett Games	Oslo, Norway	1st	100 m	10.45 s
2019	Norwegian Athletics Championships	Børstad, Hamar Municipality	1st	100 m	10.37 s

=== Para-athletics ===
Year	Competition	Venue	Position	Event	Notes
Representing Norway
2019	World Championships	Dubai, United Arab Emirates	1st	100 m	10.54 s
2021	European Championships	Bydgoszcz, Poland	1st	100 m	10.70 s
2021	Summer Paralympics	Tokyo, Japan	1st	100 m	10.43 s
2023	World Championships	Paris, France	1st	100 m	10.45 s
2024	World Championships	Kobe, Japan	3rd	100 m	10.79 s
2024	Summer Paralympics	Paris, France	2nd	100 m	10.47 s
