= Oda Utsi Onstad =

Norwegian long and triple jumper

Oda Onstad
Personal information
- Full name: Oda Utsi Onstad
- Nationality: Norway
- Born: 12 May 1990 (age 36)
- Home town: Fagernes, Norway

Sport
- Sport: Athletics
- Event(s): Long jump, triple jump
- Club: Norna-Salhus IL

Achievements and titles
- Personal bests: LJ: 6.34m (+1.8) (2019); TJ: 13.69m (-0.2) (2019); TJ (indoor): 13.65m (2019)

Oda Utsi Onstad (born 12 May 1990) is a Norwegian long and triple jumper representing Norna-Salhus IL. She is a 28-time national champion, counting indoor and outdoor junior and senior titles from 2006 to 2023. As of 2023 she is the current Norwegian record holder in the women's indoor triple jump.

== Biography ==
Onstad was raised in Fagernes, Norway. She was involved in athletics from a young age, starting as a standout in sprints. She won her first senior outdoor Norwegian Athletics Championships title in 2006 at the age of 16, in the long jump.

In 2019, Onstad set personal bests in the outdoor long jump and both the indoor and outdoor triple jump. Her jump of 13.65 metres on 2 February still stands as the Norwegian record as of 2023.

In 2020, Onstad took a break from competition for three years. In 2023, she returned, winning her 28th national title at the Norwegian Indoor Athletics Championships.

== Statistics ==
=== Personal bests ===
| Event | Mark | Competition | Venue | Date |
|---|---|---|---|---|
| Long jump | 6.34 m (+1.3 m/s) | Norwegian Athletics Championships | Hamar, Norway | 3 August 2019 |
| Triple jump | 13.69 m (-0.2 m/s) | | Oslo, Norway | 27 August 2019 |
| Triple jump (indoor) | 13.65 m NR | Norwegian Indoor Athletics Championships | Haugesund, Norway | 2 February 2019 |
