= Lisleby =

Area of Fredrikstad, Norway

Coordinates: 59.13°N 10.967°E

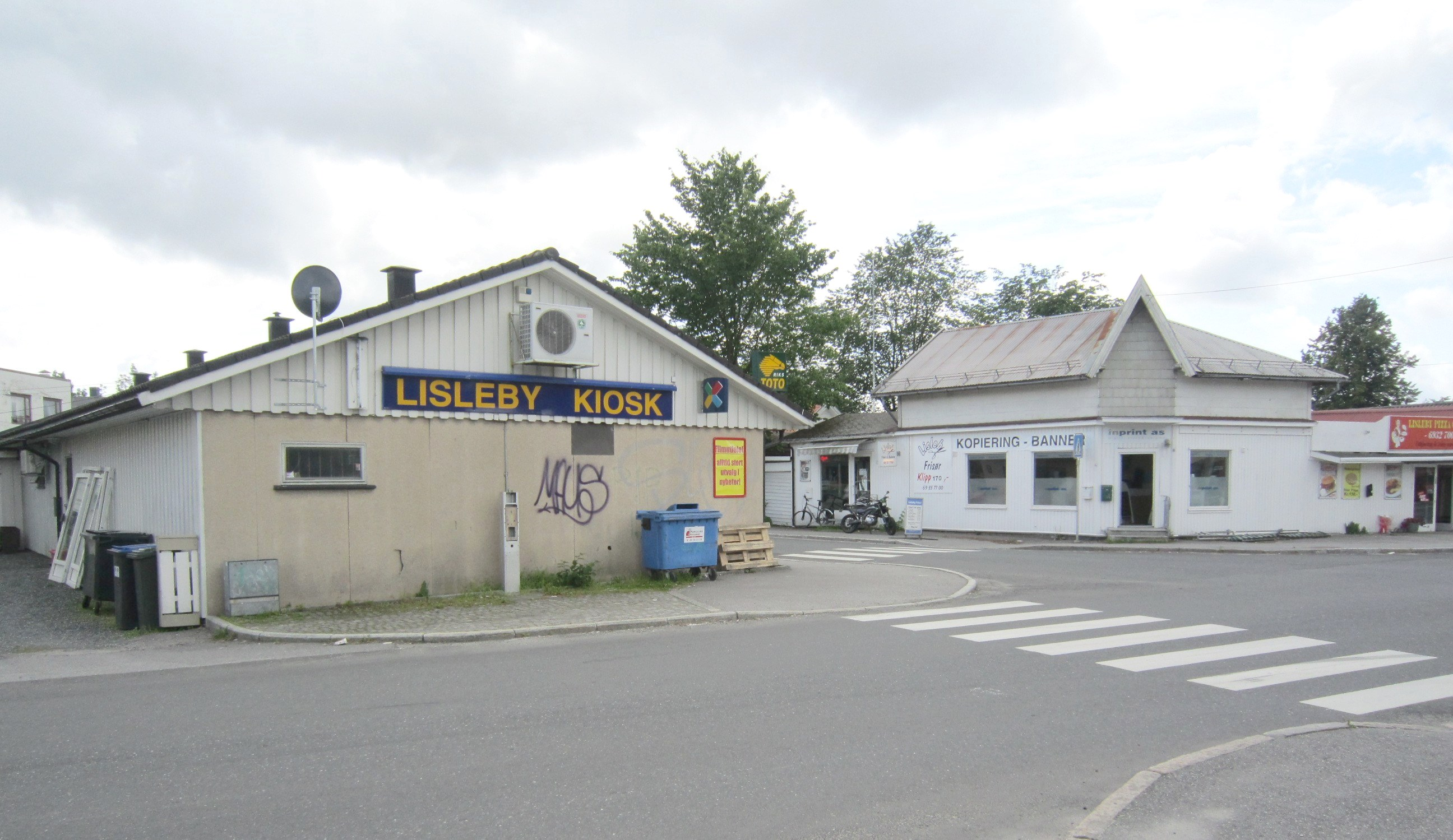
Lisleby

Lisleby is the largest of the cityparts in centrum Fredrikstad, Norway. Before 1963, Lisleby was a part Glemmen kommune. Lisleby was a center of the Fredrikstad industry, and the first electric light used in Norway, was lit in Lisleby Bruk in 1877.

It had circa 3 400 inhabitants in 2017.
