= Narve Gilje Nordås =

Norwegian runner (born 1998)

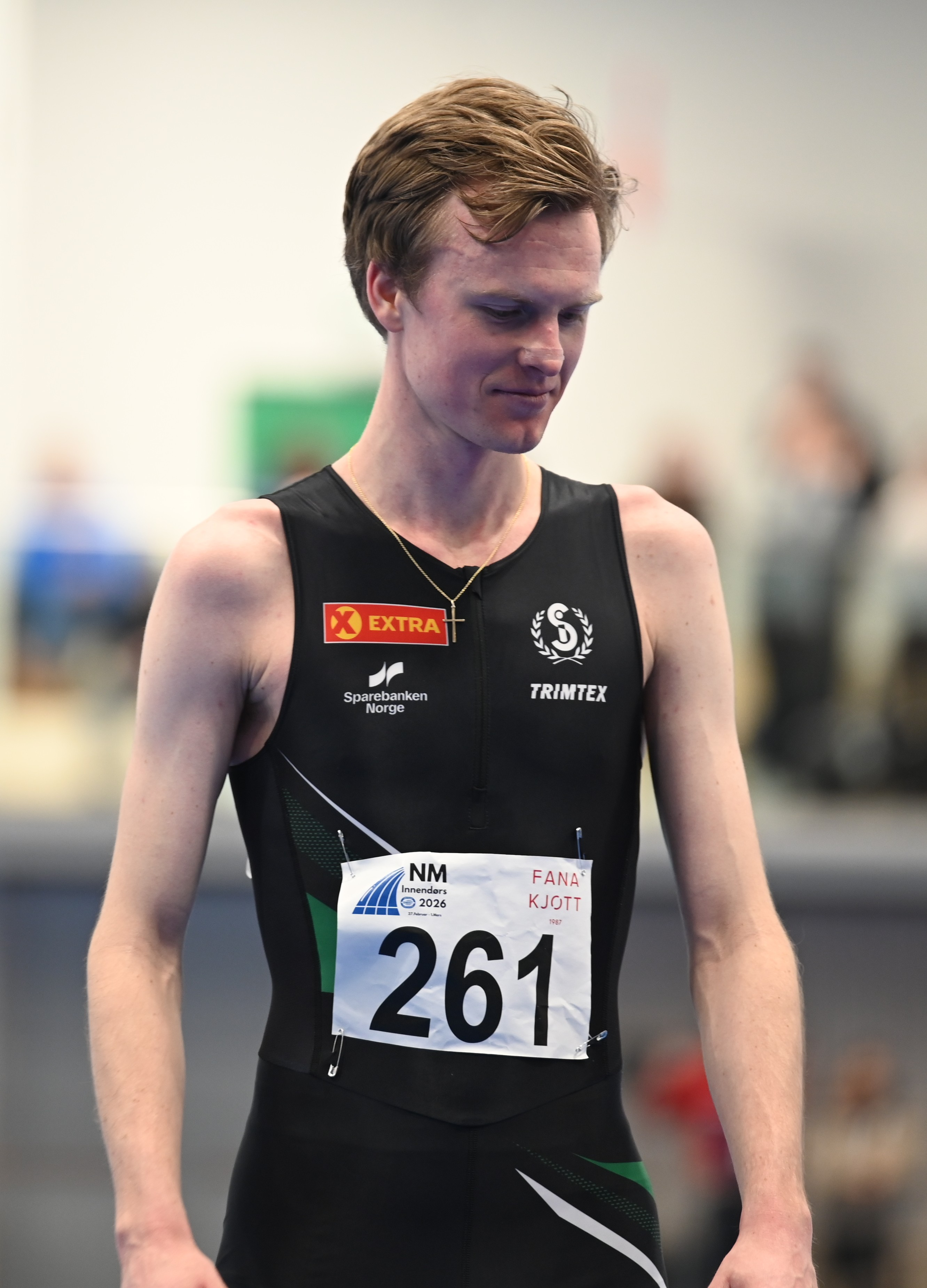
- Nordås in 2026

Personal information
- Born: 30 September 1998 (age 28) Voll, Klepp Municipality, Norway

Sport
- Sport: Athletics
- Events: 1500 m, 5000 m, 10,000 m
- Club: Sandnes IL
- Coached by: Gjert Ingebrigtsen
Medal record
Men's athletics
Representing Norway
World Championships
| Bronze medal – third place | 2023 Budapest | 1500 m |

Narve Gilje Nordås (born 30 September 1998) is a Norwegian athlete competing in middle-distance and long-distance events. He is a World Championships (2023) bronze medalist and two-time Olympian, having competed at the 2020 and 2024 Summer Olympics.

== Personal life ==
Born in Klepp Municipality on 30 September 1998, Nordås represents the club Sandnes IL, and used to be coached by Gjert Ingebrigtsen.

He married Oda Andersen Lundeby in October 2025.

== Career ==
Nordås won the gold medal in the men's 5000 metres and a silver medal in the men's 10,000 metres at the 2020 Norwegian Athletics Championships. He placed fifth in the 3000 metres event at the 2021 European Athletics Indoor Championships.

In 2021, Nordås was selected to represent Norway at the 2020 Summer Olympics in Tokyo and competed in men's 5000 metres event. In September of that year, he became Norwegian champion in the men's 5000 metres for a second time.

On 15 July 2023, Nordås set a new personal record in the 5000 metres distance during an event in Heusden, improving his personal best with more than ten seconds to 13:05.38, and thereby qualifying for the distance at the World Championships in Budapest. He won the bronze medal in the 1500 metres event at the 2023 World Athletics Championships, finishing behind Josh Kerr and Jakob Ingebrigtsen. On 2 June 2024, Nordås won the men's 3000 metres event at the Stockholm leg of the Diamond League. Nordås competed in the men's 1500 metres and 5000 metres at the 2024 Summer Olympics in Paris, placing seventh and seventeenth respectively.

In October 2024 he won his fourth victory in the road race Hytteplanmila, which also earned him a national title.

Winning the national title in 5000 metres in the 2025 Norwegian Athletics Championships, ahead of Magnus Tuv Myhre, he also set a new championship record with the time 13:08.33.

He competed in 1500 metres at the 2025 World Athletics Championships, where he reached the semi finals, and failed qualifying for the final by a margin of 0.01 seconds.

== Personal bests ==
Outdoor

- 1500 metres – 3:29.47 (Oslo 2023)
- Mile – 3:56.62 (Bergen 2020)
- 3000 metres – 7:41.31 (Lahti 2021)
- 5000 metres – 13:05.38 (Heusden 2023)
- 10,000 metres – 28:04.42 (Oslo 2022)

Indoor

- 1500 metres – 3:41.81 (Karlstad 2023)
- 3000 metres – 7:50.21 (Toruń 2021)

== Competition record ==
=== International competitions ===
Representing Norway
| Year | Competition | Venue | Position | Event | Notes |
|---|---|---|---|---|---|
| 2017 | European U20 Championships | Grosseto, Italy | 5th | 10,000 m | 31:36.30 |
| 2017 | European U20 Championships | Grosseto, Italy | 10th | 5000m | 15:16.29 |
| 2019 | European U20 Championships | Gävle, Sweden | 6th | 10,000 m | 28:59.04 |
| 2019 | European U23 Cross Country Championships | Lisbon, Portugal | 19th | 8 km | 25:15 |
| 2021 | European Indoor Championships | Toruń, Poland | 5th | 3,000 m | 7:50.21 |
| 2021 | Olympic Games | Tokyo, Japan | 12th (sf) | 5000 m | 13:41.82 |
| 2021 | European Cross Country Championships | Dublin, Ireland | 25th | 10 km | 31:30 |
| 2022 | World Championships | Eugene, United States | 24th (sf) | 5000 m | 13:37.14 |
| 2022 | European Championships | Munich, Germany | 17th | 5000 m | 13:39.12 |
| 2022 | European Cross Country Championships | Venaria Reale, Italy | 21st | 10 km | 30:40 |
| 2023 | World Championships | Budapest, Hungary | 3rd | 1500 m | 3:29.68 |
| 2023 | World Championships | Budapest, Hungary | 5th | 5000 m | 13:28.73 |
| 2024 | World Indoor Championships | Glasgow, United Kingdom | 5th | 1500 m | 3:37.03 |
| 2024 | European Championships | Rome, Italy | 11th | 5000 m | 13:26.91 |
| 2024 | European Championships | Rome, Italy | 26th | 1500 m | 3:46.15 |
| 2024 | Olympic Games | Paris, France | 7th | 1500 m | 3:30.46 |
| 2024 | Olympic Games | Paris, France | 17th | 5000 m | 13:31.34 |
| 2025 | European Running Championships | Leuven, Belgium | 11th | 10 km | 28:22 |
| 2025 | World Championships | Tokyo, Japan | 7th (sf) | 1500 m | 3:35.72 |
| 2025 | World Championships | Tokyo, Japan | 12th (h) | 5000 m | 13:25.00 |
| 2026 | European Championships | Birmingham, United Kingdom | 7th | 1500 m | 3:37.31 |
| 2026 | World Road Running Championships | Copenhagen, Denmark | 15th | 5 km | 13:17 |
