= Moss IL =

Norwegian athletics club

- Full name: Moss Idrettslag
- Founded: June 7, 1929
- Ground: Melløs Stadion; Moss

Moss Idrettslag is a Norwegian athletics club from Moss, founded in 1929.

Moss IL uses the Melløs Stadion, which in 1983 got rubber track as the first stadium in Østfold county.

Its most prominent members consist of Are Nakkim, winner of the silver medal in 10,000 metres at the 1990 European Championships in Athletics, Geir Moen, a former European and World Indoor champion in the 200 metres. Nakkim still holds the national record in 10,000 m while Moen holds the 100 and 200 m record. Moen also ran for the 4 x 100 metres relay team consisting of Birger Hermansen, Jørn Tollefsen, Martin Blekkerud and Moen, that won the Norwegian championships in 1997, 1998 and 1999. Their result of 40.40 seconds from Ørsta 1997 is still the Norwegian record for a club team.
