= Fredrikstad IF =

Norwegian sports club

- Full name: Fredrikstad Idrettsforening
- Founded: 4 September 1896
- Ground: Sentralidrettsanlegget, Lisleby

Fredrikstad Idrettsforening is a Norwegian athletics club from Fredrikstad, founded on 4 September 1896.

As a stadium the club uses the Sentralidrettsanlegget in Lisleby, a borough of Fredrikstad. They hosted the Norwegian athletics championships in 2003.

Its most prominent members are Mette Bergmann and Tor Øivind Ødegård.
