= Amalie Sæten =

Norwegian-distance runner (born 1997)

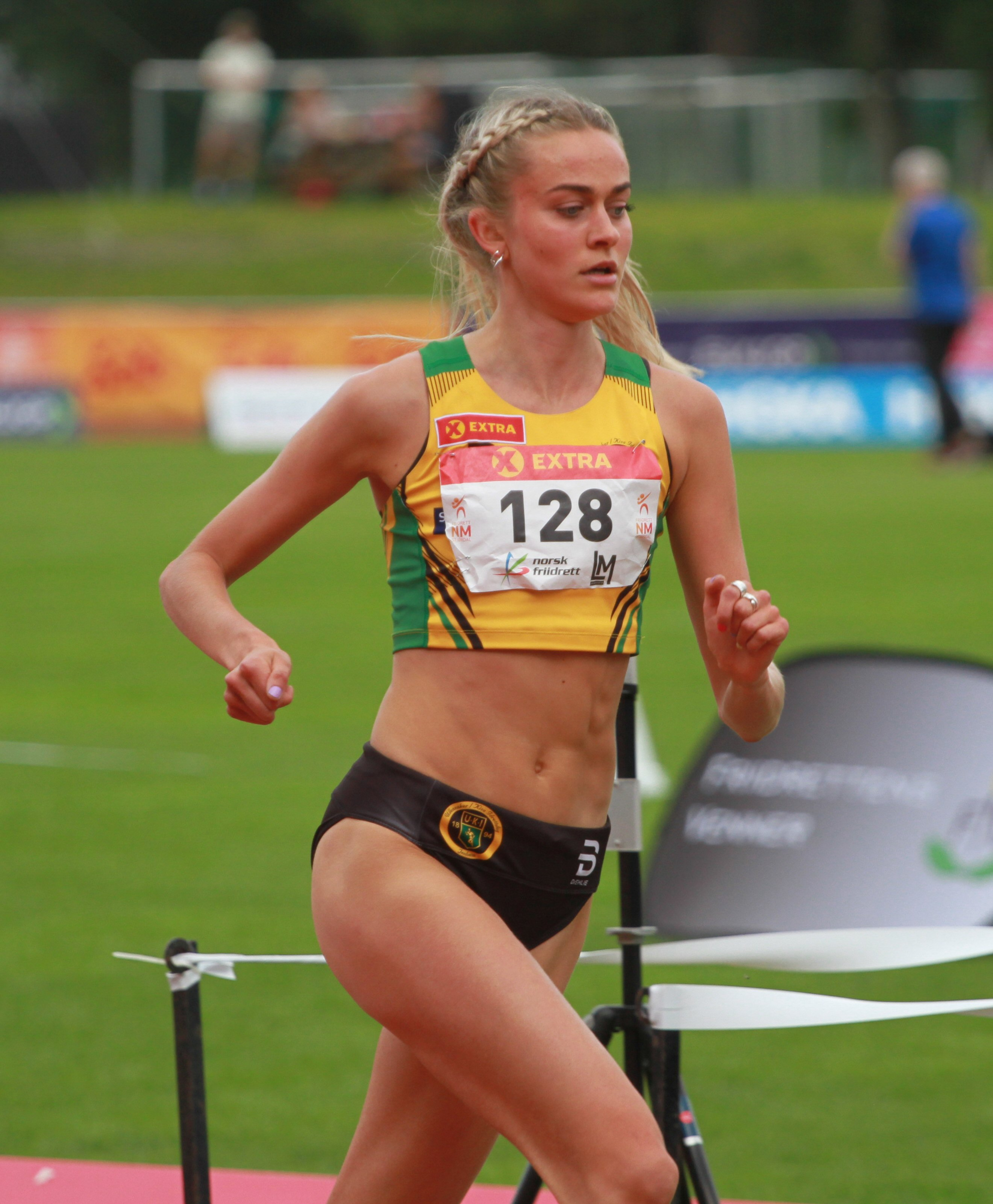
- Sæten in 2022

Personal information
- Full name: Amalie Manshaus Sæten
- Born: 1 December 1997 (age 28)

Sport
- Sport: Athletics
- Event: Middle-distance running

Achievements and titles
- Personal bests: 800m: 2:04.63 (2025); 1500m: 4:08.08 (2023); 3000m: 8:49.72 (2025); 5000m:15:07.33 (2025); Indoors; 800m: 2:07.50 (2020); 1500m: 4:17.46 (2023); 3000m: 9:11.91 (2023); Road; 5k: 15:29 (2026); 10k: 32:37 (2025)

Amalie Manshaus Sæten (born 1 December 1997) is a Norwegian middle-distance runner. A multiple-time national champion, she represented Norway at the 2023 World Championships over 1500 metres, where she ran a personal best time of 4:08.08.

== Personal life ==
She hails from Kristiansand. As a youth she also played football, before focusing on running.

She changed clubs from Kristiansands IF to Ullensaker/Kisa IL in 2018 and later SK Vidar ahead of the 2025 season. During her time in Ull/Kisa she was coached by Knut Jæger Hansen, before changing coaches to Ådne Andersen. She has also been in a relationship with Andersen since 2019.

== Career ==
Sæten became the Norwegian national champion on the track over 1500 metres in September 2020, with a time of 4:38.30 in Bergen, Sæten set a new personal best competing in the 1500 metres for Norway at the 2023 World Athletics Championships in Budapest, running 4:08.08. She also represented Norway over 1500 metres at the 2022 and 2024 European Athletics Championships.

Sæten lowered her personal best in the 3000 metres in May 2021 to 9.06.10 at the Per Halle Invitational in Greveskogen, Tønsberg. She lowered it the following year to 8:57.18 at the same event in Greveskogen.

Sæten is also a three-time national champion over 5000 metres. She won for the first time in June 2022, with a time of 16:02.16. She won further titles in quicker times, running 15:38.63 in July 2023, and 15:32.21 in August 2025.

In September 2019, competing on the road she won the Norgesløpet 5k title, running 16:51 in Jessheim. Sæten ran below 16 minutes for the 5k run for the first time on 31 December 2022 in Barcelona, with 15:47. In September 2024, she won the senior Norwegian women's 5k title, running 16:13 in Jessheim.
