= IL Skjalg =

Norwegian sports club

- Full name: Idrettslaget Skjalg
- Founded: 22 October 1935
- Ground: Stavanger stadion Stavanger

Idrettslaget Skjalg is an athletics club from Stavanger, Norway.

The club was founded on 22 October 1935 by Fritjov Lund, Harald Hansen and Søren von Krogh. Harald Hansen became its first national champion, winning the high jump in 1938. The club was discontinued from July 1941 and throughout the rest of the German occupation of Norway. During the post-war period, the club was noted for its two Olympians, Bjørn Paulson and Bjørn Nilsen.

The club is a tenant of Stavanger stadion, which got fixed surface in 1980. The stadium was rebuilt in 2006 after Viking FK discontinued their tenancy. The club arranged the 1972 Norwegian Championships (together with Stavanger FIK and IL Viking), the Norwegian Cross-Country Running Championships of 1975 and 2016 (short course) as well as two Norwegian championships in standings jumps: 1939 (men only) and 1947 (the first edition to include women). Other national championships include the 1993 Norwegian combined events championship and the 2006 Norwegian relay championship. The club's largest event was the 1989 IAAF World Cross Country Championships.

In the 1980s, the club saw another high point as the women's team won the Holmenkollstafetten road relay in 1986, 1989 and 1990. During the 1980s, world record holder Ingrid Kristiansen was a member of the club, as were prolific national medalists Christin and Maiken Sørum. Before and after 2010, another runner Kristine Eikrem Engeset represented IL Skjalg. Zerei Kbrom Mezngi represented the club as well.

In 1994, Skjalg's male relay team set the Norwegian record in the 4 x 400 meter relay (for clubs, excluding national teams). With two different team members, Skjalg also set the Norwegian record for clubs in the 4 x 200 meter relay. The most meritorious sprinters on the team were Per Ivar Sivle and Jens Storhaug. In the 2000s, Skjalg produced the sprinter Elisabeth Slettum, who won became Norwegian champion in the 200 metres nine times, as well as Mathias Hove Johansen who claimed national titles in the same event for men.
