= IL Norna-Salhus =

Norwegian athletics club

- Full name: Idrettslaget Norna-Salhus
- Founded: 14 October 1935
- Ground: Salhus idrettsplass Salhus, Bergen

Idrettslaget Norna-Salhus is a Norwegian athletics club from Salhus in Åsane, Bergen

It was founded on 14 October 1935. The club originally had an association football section as well, but it split away in 1987 to form FK Bergen Nord.

Since this split Norna-Salhus gradually rose to prominence in national athletics, especially within the jumping section. Triple jumpers Sigurd Njerve and Ketill Hanstveit established Norwegian records. Other athletes such as decathlete Benjamin Jensen, race walkers Kjersti Plätzer and Erik Tysse, hammer thrower Mona Holm, and jumper Oda Utsi Onstad have later joined Norna-Salhus.
