= IL Gular =

Norwegian sports club

- Full name: Idrottslaget Gular
- Founded: 1946
- Ground: Fana stadion Leikvang stadion Bergen

Idrottslaget Gular is a Norwegian athletics club from Bergen, founded in 1946. In the past it has had sections for handball, skiing, gymnastics and football.

The athletics section cooperates on youth level with local clubs Bergens TF and TIL Hovding, which act as feeder teams.

Its most prominent members are long-distance runners Arne Risa, Arne Hamarsland and athlete Knut Hjeltnes. Arne Risa has worked as a coach after retiring, so has Diane Modahl.
