= Dimna IL =

- Full name: Dimna Idrettslag
- Founded: 3 December 1974
- Ground: Høddvoll, Ulsteinvik

Dimna Idrettslag is a Norwegian athletics club from Dimnøya, Ulsteinvik, Møre og Romsdal. The club colours are green and white.

The club was founded on 3 December 1974, and did not take up any team sports because the island Dimnøya had a population too small to support a team. Instead, athletics was chosen to give the local populace a sport to practice. Replacing IL Hødd as the local athletics club of choice, Dimna IL started being a tenant of Høddvoll Stadium and of the indoor track arena Ulsteinhallen, both in the nearby town of Ulsteinvik. Dimna IL is best known as the club of World and Olympic champion and world record holder Karsten Warholm.
