= IL Gneist =

Norwegian sports club

- Full name: Idrettslaget Gneist
- Founded: 16 December 1945
- Ground: Sandslihallen (handball); Liland kunstgress (football); Bergen

IL Gneist
Home colours

IL Gneist is a sports club from Ytrebygda, Bergen, Norway founded on December 16, 1945. It has several branches, including association football, handball, athletics, gymnastics, orienteering, climbing and volleyball.

The main seat is in Liland, not far from Flesland International Airport.

The men's football team plays in the Norwegian Third Division, the women's team in the Third Division.

The men's handball team plays in the Norwegian Third Division, the women's team in the First Division.
