= Ranheim IL =

Norwegian sports club

Ranheim Idrettslag
- Founded: 17 February 1901
- Based in: Trondheim, Norway
- Stadium: Extra Arena (association football), Ranheimshallen (handball, track and field)
- Colours: Blue; White
- Website: http://www.ril.no/

Ranheim Idrettslag is a Norwegian alliance sports club from Ranheim, Trondheim. It has sections for association football, team handball and track and field. The football club plays in the 1. Divisjon of Norway

== General history ==
The club was founded on 17 February 1901.

== Association football ==
Ranheim Fotball
- Full name: Ranheim Fotball
- Founded: 17 February 1901; 125 years ago
- Ground: Extra Arena
- Capacity: 3,000
- Head coach: Svein Maalen
- League: 1. divisjon
- 2019: Eliteserien, 16th of 16 (relegated)
Home colours	Away colours	Third colours

Ranheim Fotball is the name of the football section. The men's team currently plays in 1. divisjon the second tier of the Norwegian football league system. Their home ground is Extra Arena.

Ranheim played in the Norwegian top flight in the seasons; 1937–38, 1938–39, 1939–40 and 1947–48, as well as in the seasons; 1949–50, 1952–53, 1954–55 and 1955–56. They promoted to the 2018 Eliteserien and were relegated to the second tier in the 2019 season.

Since 2006, Ranheim has acted as a farm club for Rosenborg, where the goal has been to establish a football team from Trøndelag in the 1. divisjon. Ranheim came close to qualifying in 2007 and 2008. Former manager Per Joar Hansen earned Ranheim a promotion to the 1. divisjon after the 2009 season. They played their first 6 home matches at Abrahallen, and on 10 July 2010, they moved to their new stadium, EXTRA Arena. Ranheim finished 5th in the 2010 1. divisjon and qualified for the promotion play-offs for a place in the Tippeligaen. In the 2017 season Ranheim gained promotion to the top level for the first time since the 1955–56 after beating Sogndal. Over two legs, they first lost 1–0 away and went on to win 1–0 at home. After two scoreless periods of extra time they secured promotion by winning 5–4 on penalties. Ranheim finished the 2018 season in 7th place, and head coach Svein Maalen received the Eliteserien Coach of the Year award for this accomplishment. In the following 2019 season, the club finished 16th and last and were relegated.

== Track and field ==
Ranheim's best known track athlete is runner Ernst Larsen.

In 2010 the club received the first indoor arena for track and field in Norway.
