= SK Vidar =

Norwegian sports club

- Full name: Sportsklubben Vidar
- Founded: 1 September 1919
- Ground: Bislett stadion Oslo

Sportsklubben Vidar is a Norwegian sports club from Oslo. It has sections for track and field, triathlon, and archery.

== Organization ==
The club was founded in 1919. It was later a member of the Workers' Sports Federation before the war.

It arranges Oslo Marathon, and also the Grete Waitz Run from 1984 to 2003 and the cross-country skiing race Vidar Run from 1933 to 1993. Together with the clubs IK Tjalve and IL i BUL it forms the "Bislett Alliance", which arranges the Bislett Games. The Bislett Alliance also hosted the Norwegian Championships in 2006.

== Athletic history ==
=== Throwing ===
SK Vidar has been an important club in the men's javelin throw event for many years. Terje Pedersen took his first of four Norwegian championships in 1960, and later set a world record. Per Erling Olsen won in the years 1980 through 1984, and Øystein Slettevold in 1986. Andreas Thorkildsen won his first Olympic title, in 2004, while representing Vidar and became Norwegian champion in 2001, 2003, 2004 and 2005 while representing the club. Other athletes have won national silver and bronze medals, including Thorkildsen's coach Åsmund Martinsen who won bronze in 1994. Solfrid Haug, Anne Grete Bæraas and Unn Merete Lie have won the women's javelin titles.

Another prominent thrower is Mette Bergmann, who represented Vidar and won national titles in the years from 1991 through 2000. For men, Svein Inge Valvik and Olav Jenssen have won national gold for Vidar. Bergmann and Lie have hammer throw titles for women; so do the brothers Anders and Bjørnar Halvorsen for men. The club has been less successful in the shot put, with only one national gold (Roar Hoff, 1992). Young talent Leif Olve Dolonen Larsen represented the club before going on to other sports.

=== Running ===
In the road relay Holmenkollstafetten the women's team has won ten times, but never the men.

Grete Waitz, Atle Douglas, Jim Svenøy

Jan Gulbrandsen

=== Jumping ===
Hanne Haugland
