= Amund Høie Sjursen =

Norwegian sprinter and long jumper (born 1996)

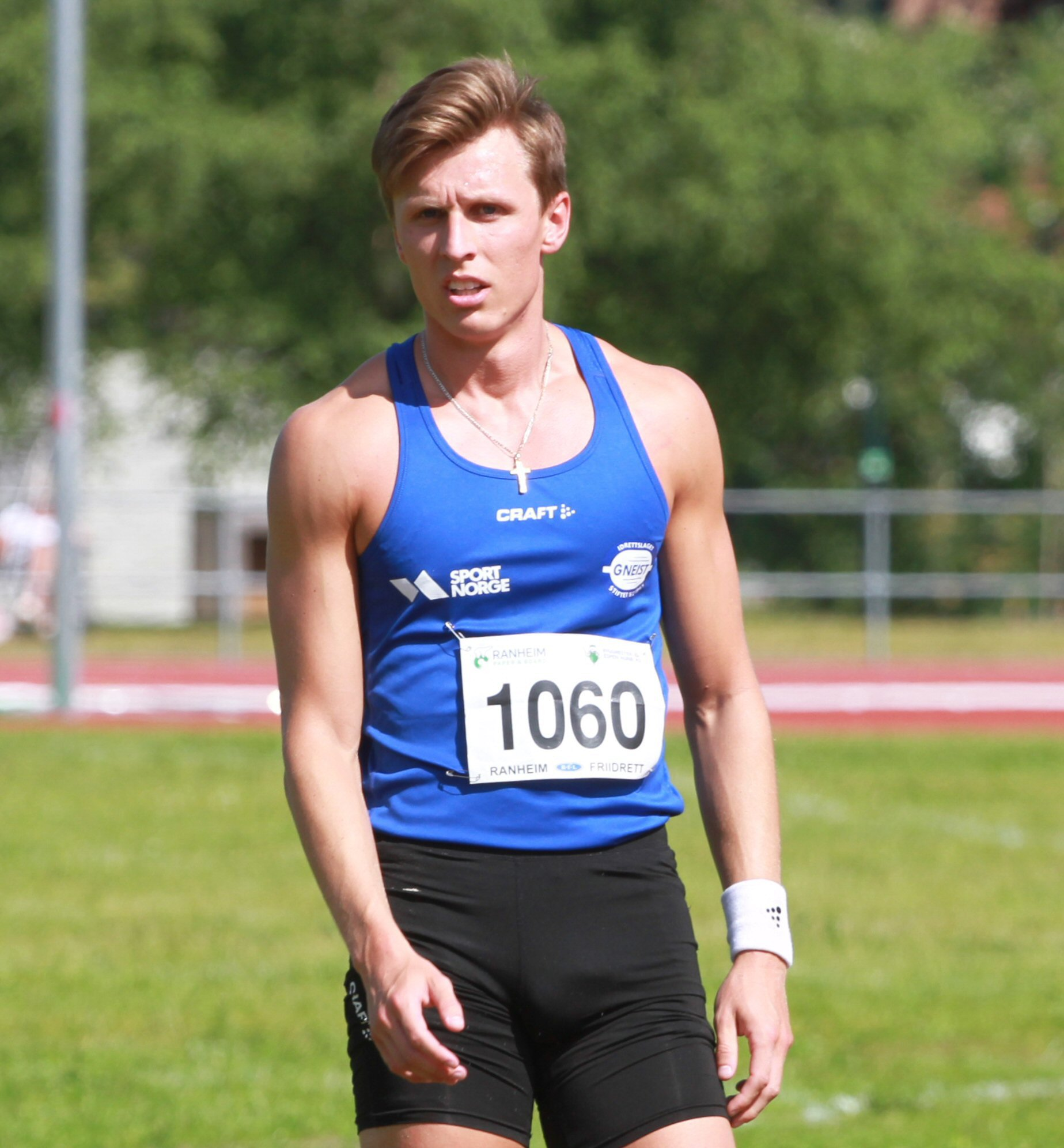
Amund Høie Sjursen

Amund Høie Sjursen (born 16 January 1996) is a Norwegian professional athlete who competes in long jump and sprinting. Sjursen has won the honours of National champion and National Indoor champion twice.
