= Norwegian Indoor Athletics Championships =

National sports competition

- Sport: Track and field
- Founded: 1964
- Country: Norway

The Norwegian Indoor Athletics Championships (Norwegian: Norgesmesterskapet i friidrett innendørs) is an annual indoor track and field competition organised by the Norwegian Athletics Association, which serves as the Norwegian indoor national championship for the sport.

It was first held in 1964 as a non-championship event, before receiving official national sanctioning in 2004. After this change, foreign athletes could only compete as guests, and then only where they are members of a Norwegian athletics club. The competition is unusual in its long-established hosting of standing variations of the high and long jump, dating back to 1919.

== Events ==
The following athletics events feature as standard on the Norwegian Indoor Championships programme:

- Sprint: 60 m, 200 m, 400 m
- Distance track events: 800 m, 1500 m, 3000 m
- Hurdles: 60 m hurdles
- Jumps: long jump, triple jump, high jump, pole vault, standing high jump, standing long jump
- Throws: shot put
- Combined events: heptathlon (men), pentathlon (women)
- Race walks: 5000 m walk (men), 3000 m walk (women)
