= Norwegian Athletics Championships =

Annual outdoor track and field competition in Norway

- Sport: Track and field
- Founded: 1896
- Country: Norway

The Norwegian Athletics Championships (Norwegian: Norgesmesterskapet i friidrett) is an annual outdoor track and field competition organised by the Norwegian Athletics Association, which serves as the national championship for the sport in Norway. Royal trophies (Kongepokal) are given to the most outstanding male and female athletes of the competition.

Typically organised in July, the event was first held in 1896 and introduced the first events for women in 1947. The championships was not held between 1940–45 due to World War II. Separate annual championship events are held for the 10,000 metres, relay races, combined track and field events, cross country running, mountain running and the road running and racewalking events. There is also a Norwegian Indoor Athletics Championships.

== Events ==
The competition programme features a total of 42 individual Norwegian Championship athletics events, 21 for men and 21 for women. For each of the sexes, there are six track running events, three obstacle events, four jumps, four throws, two walks and one combined track and field event.

Track running

- 100 metres, 200 metres, 400 metres, 800 metres, 1500 metres, 5000 metres

Obstacle events

- 100 metres hurdles (women only), 110 metres hurdles (men only), 400 metres hurdles, 3000 metres steeplechase

Jumping events

- Pole vault, high jump, long jump, triple jump

Throwing events

- Shot put, discus throw, javelin throw, hammer throw

Racewalking

- 3000 metres race walk (women only), 5000 metres race walk, 10,000 metres race walk (men only)

Combined events

- Decathlon (men only), Heptathlon (women only)

In the early history of the competition, men took part in a pentathlon championship up to 1969. The men's 10,000 m walk was first held in 1961 and this was supplemented by the 5000 m walk in 2000.

The women's programme was initially restricted compared to the men's. In track events, a women's 1500 m was added in 1969, followed by the 3000 metres in 1973, the 5000 m in 1982 and the 10,000 m in 1994. The women's 3000 m was dropped after 1995, given the presence of two other women's distance events. The 80 metres hurdles was replaced with the international standard 100 m hurdles in 1969 and the first women's 400 m hurdles championship was contested in 1976. The 2000 women's steeplechase championship marked the third and final obstacle-based event to be added. The women's field events eventually came to parity with the men's, following the introduction of the triple jump in 1991, and pole vault and hammer throw in 1996. In women's combined events, a triathlon existed up to 1967. The women's pentathlon was replaced by the heptathlon in 1981.

== Championship records ==
=== Men ===
Event	Record	Athlete/Team	Date	Place	Ref.
1500 m	3:33.26	Jakob Ingebrigtsen	2021	Kristiansand	
5000 m	13:08.33	Narve Gilje Nordås	1 August 2025	Askøy	
400 m hurdles	46.76	Karsten Warholm	6 July 2023	Jessheim	
Pole vault	6.00 m	Sondre Guttormsen	24 July 2026	Trondheim	
Swedish relay	1:51.02	Moelven IL; Sondre Rudi; Carl Kåshagen; Alexander Løvik Nyheim; Håvard Bentdal Ingvaldsen	8 July 2023	Jessheim	

=== Women ===
Event	Record	Athlete/Team	Date	Place	Ref.
200 m	22.55 (+1.6 m/s) NR	Henriette Jæger	25 July 2026	Trondheim	
400 m	51.69	Henriette Jæger	28 June 2024	Sandnes	
