= IL Tyrving =

Norwegian sports club

- Full name: Idrettslaget Tyrving
- Founded: 18 June 1922
- Ground: Nadderud stadion Bekkestua

Idrettslaget Tyrving is a Norwegian sports club from Bærum, founded in 1922. It has sections for athletics and orienteering. It is named after Tyrfing in Norse mythology.

IL Tyrving uses the stadium Nadderud stadion, and hosts the annual Tyrvinglekene, the largest athletics meet in Norway. The club has hosted one international event, the European Cup B Final in 2000.

Among its most prominent members are Berit Berthelsen, winner of two European Indoor Championships and national record holder in the long jump, and Christina Vukicevic, silver medalist in 100 m hurdles at the 2006 World Junior Championships in Athletics. Romanian Olympic high jumper Adrian Proteasa has also represented Tyrving, although well past his active career.
