= IK Tjalve =

Norwegian sports club

- Full name: Idrettsklubben Tjalve
- Founded: 27 December 1890
- Ground: Bislett stadion Oslo

Idrettsklubben Tjalve is a Norwegian athletics club from Oslo, founded on 27 December 1890. It is named after Þjálfi in Norse mythology.

It is one of the most prominent athletics clubs in Norway, and numerous members have represented Norway in international competitions.

IK Tjalve uses Bislett Stadium.
