= Sandnes IL =

Norwegian sports club

Sandnes Idrettslag is a Norwegian sports club from Sandnes, founded in 1946. The club has sections for track and field athletics, orienteering and skiing.

Athletes competing for Sandnes IL include Henrik Ingebrigtsen, Bjørnar Ustad Kristensen, Filip Ingebrigtsen, Lars Vikan Rise, Per Magne Florvaag, Marius Bakken Støle, and Jakob Ingebrigtsen.
