= Helene Rønningen =

Norwegian sprinter (born 1998)

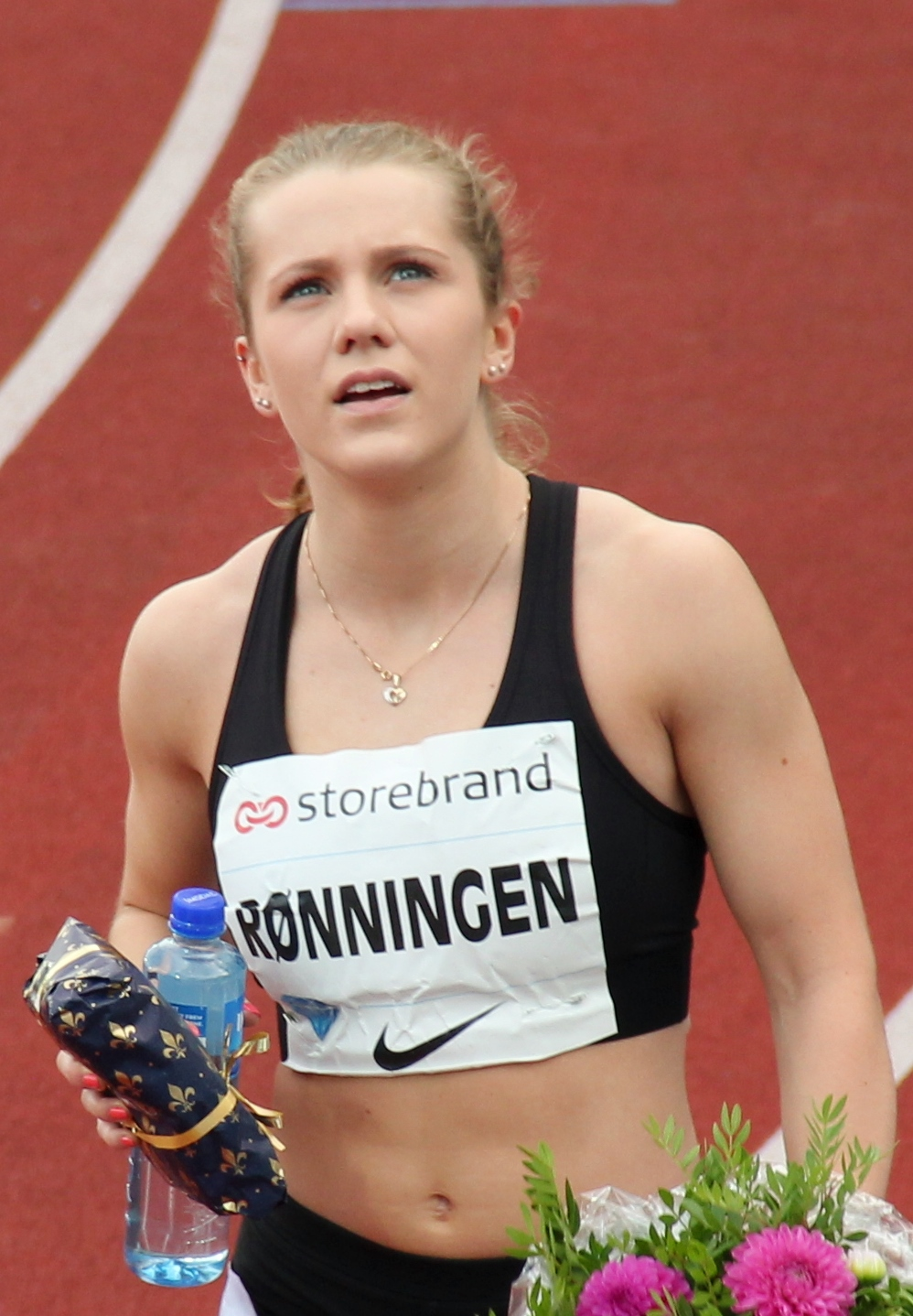
- Helene Rønningen (2017)

Personal information
- Born: 4 September 1998 (age 27)

Sport
- Country: Norway
- Sport: Athletics
- Events: 100 metres; 200 metres

Helene Rønningen (born 4 September 1998) is a Norwegian athlete competing in 100 metres and 200 metres events.

In 2018, she set a new national record of 23.41s in the indoor 200 metres event at the Norwegian Indoor Athletics Championships.

== Achievements ==
Year	Competition	Venue	Position	Event	Notes
Representing Norway
2014	World Junior Championships in Athletics	Eugene, Oregon, United States	45th	100 m	12.16
2016	World U20 Championships	Bydgoszcz, Poland	15th (h)	200 m	23.92
2016	World U20 Championships	Bydgoszcz, Poland	17th (sf)	200 m	24.04
2017	European Athletics Indoor Championships	Belgrade, Serbia	16th (h)	60 m	7.40
2017	European Athletics Indoor Championships	Belgrade, Serbia	21st (sf)	60 m	7.45
2018	European Athletics Championships	Berlin, Germany	20th (h)	100 m	11.70
2018	European Athletics Championships	Berlin, Germany	21st (h)	200 m	23.96
2018	Norwegian Indoor Athletics Championships	Baerum, Norway	1st (h)	60 m	7.56
2018	Norwegian Indoor Athletics Championships	Baerum, Norway	1st (sf)	60 m	7.41
2018	Norwegian Indoor Athletics Championships	Baerum, Norway	1st	60 m	7.37
2018	Norwegian Indoor Athletics Championships	Baerum, Norway	1st (h)	200 m	23.62
2018	Norwegian Indoor Athletics Championships	Baerum, Norway	1st	200 m	23.41
2019	European Athletics Indoor Championships	Glasgow, United Kingdom	25th (h)	60 m	7.41
2019	European Athletics U23 Championships	Gävle, Sweden	5th (h)	100 m	11.88
2019	European Athletics U23 Championships	Gävle, Sweden	15th (sf)	100 m	11.93
2019	European Athletics U23 Championships	Gävle, Sweden	13th (h)	200 m	24.04
2019	European Athletics U23 Championships	Gävle, Sweden	13th (sf)	200 m	24.37
2019	European Athletics U23 Championships	Gävle, Sweden	10th (h)	4 × 100 m	45.04
2019	Norwegian Athletics Championships	Hamar, Norway	2nd	100 m	11.48
2019	Norwegian Athletics Championships	Hamar, Norway	2nd	200 m	24.02
