= Sande Municipality (Vestfold) =

Former municipality in Norway

Sande Municipality Sande kommune
- Former municipality
- Sande herred (historic name)
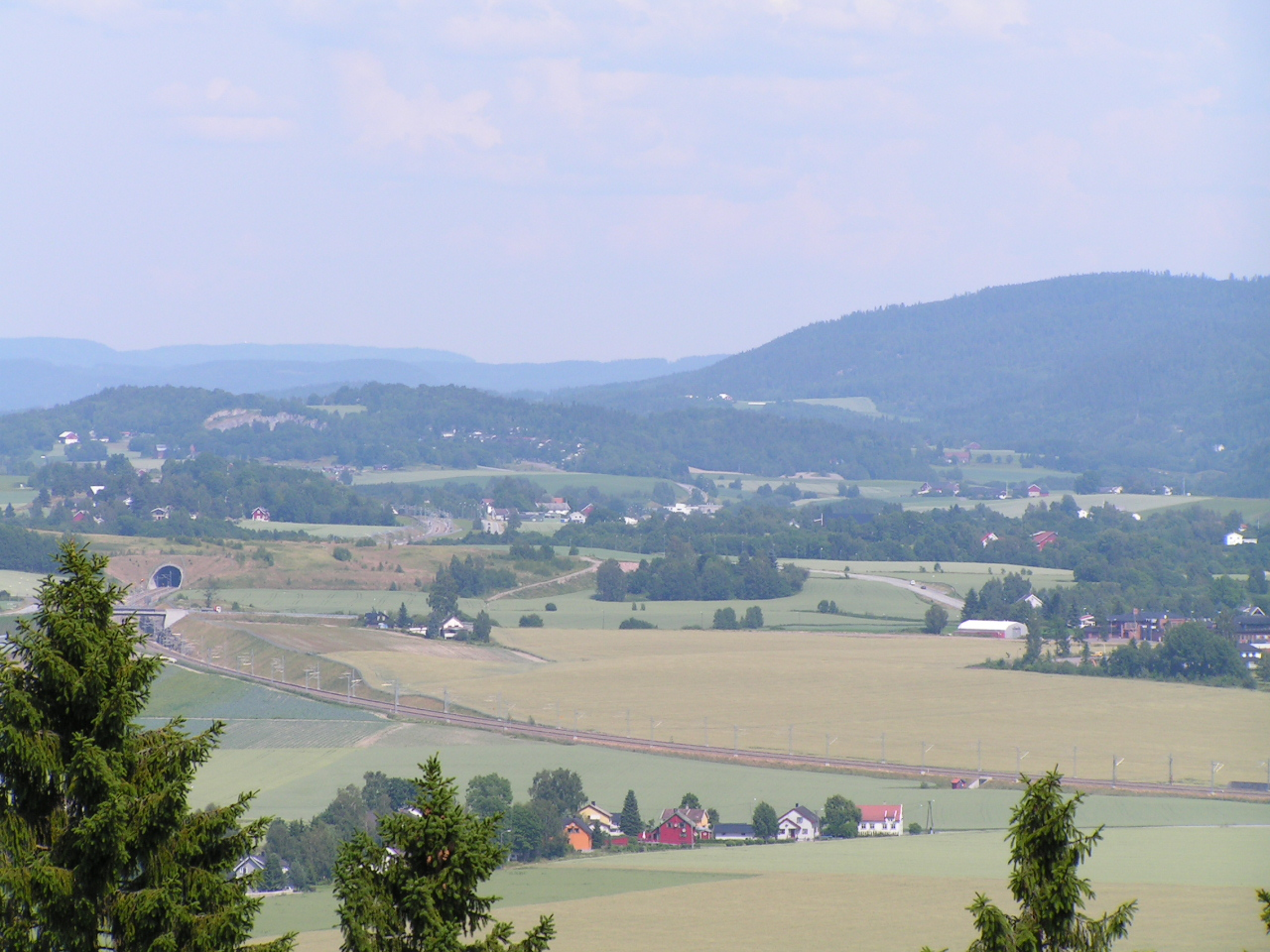

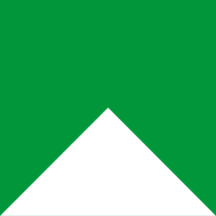
- Flag Coat of arms

- Vestfold within Norway

- Sande within Vestfold
- Coordinates: 59°35′12″N 10°12′29″E
- Country: Norway
- County: Vestfold
- District: Jarlsberg
- Established: 1 Jan 1838
  - Created as: Formannskapsdistrikt
- Disestablished: 1 Jan 2020
  - Succeeded by: Holmestrand Municipality
- Administrative centre: Sande

Government
  - Mayor (2015–2019): Elin G. Weggesrud (Ap)

Area (upon dissolution)
  - Total: 178.34 km^{2} (68.86 sq mi)
  - Land: 174.26 km^{2} (67.28 sq mi)
  - Water: 4.08 km^{2} (1.58 sq mi) 2.3%
  - Rank: #344 in Norway
- Highest elevation (Presteseteråsen): 570.4 m (1,871 ft)

Population (2019)
  - Total: 9,904
  - Rank: #115 in Norway
  - Density: 56.8/km^{2} (147/sq mi)
  - Change (10 years): ▲ +20.6%
- Demonym: Sandesokning

Official language
  - Norwegian form: Bokmål
- Time zone: UTC+01:00 (CET)
  - Summer (DST): UTC+02:00 (CEST)
- ISO 3166 code: NO-0713

Sande (Norwegian pronunciation: [²sɑnːə]; locally [²sɑnːe]) is a former municipality in Vestfold county, Norway. The 178.34-square-kilometre (68.86 sq mi) municipality existed from 1838 until its dissolution in 2020. The area is now part of Holmestrand Municipality in the traditional district of Jarlsberg. The administrative centre was the village of Sande. Other villages in the municipality included Eikeberg, Klever, and Selvik.

Prior to its dissolution in 2020, the 178.34-square-kilometre (68.86 sq mi) municipality was the 344th largest by area out of the 422 municipalities in Norway. Sande Municipality was the 115th most populous municipality in Norway with a population of about 9,904. The municipality's population density was 56.8 inhabitants per square kilometre (147/sq mi) and its population had increased by 20.6% over the previous 10-year period.

== General information ==
=== Administrative history ===
The formannskapsdistrikt law of 1837 created a system of local government in Norway by establishing each town (ladested or kjøpstad) and each Church of Norway prestegjeld as a civil municipality. On 1 January 1838, Sande prestegjeld was established as Sande Municipality.

During the 1960s, there were many municipal mergers across Norway due to the work of the Schei Committee. On 1 January 1966, the Berger village area (population: 131) was transferred from Sande Municipality to the neighboring Svelvik Municipality.

In 2020, there were many municipal and county mergers across Norway due to the work of the Solberg cabinet. On 1 January 2020, Sande Municipality was dissolved and the following areas were merged to form an enlarged Holmestrand Municipality:

- all of Sande Municipality (population: 9,904)
- all of Holmestrand Municipality (population: 14,371)

=== Name ===
The municipality is named after the old Sande prestegjeld. The prestegjeld was named after the old Sande farm (Old Norse: Sandvin) since the first Sande Church was built there. The first element comes from the word sandr which means "sand". The last element comes from the word vin which means "meadow" or "pasture".

=== Coat of arms ===
The coat of arms was granted on 19 December 1986. The official blazon is "Per chevron vert and argent" (Norwegian: Delt av grønt og sølv ved sparresnitt). This means the arms are divided with an upside-down V-shaped line. The field (background) above the line has a tincture of green. Below the line, the field has a tincture of argent which means it is commonly colored white, but if it is made out of metal, then silver is used. The white/silver color in the lower field symbolizes the Sandebukta bay and the green color of the upper field symbolizes the forests and mountains that surround the bay. The arms were designed by Einar Engebretsen. The municipal flag has the same design as the coat of arms.

=== Churches ===
The Church of Norway had one parish (sokn) within Sande Municipality. At the time of the municipal dissolution, it was part of the Nord-Jarlsberg prosti (deanery) in the Diocese of Tunsberg.

Churches in Sande Municipality
Parish (sokn)	Church name	Location of the church	Year built
Sande	Sande Church	Sande i Vestfold	1093

== Geography ==
The highest point in the municipality was the 570.4-metre (1,871 ft) tall mountain Presteseteråsen, located in westernmost part of the municipality. The mountain Lauvkollen lies just northeast of Presteseteråsen.

Drammen Municipality (in Buskerud county) was located to the north, Svelvik Municipality was located to the east, Holmestrand Municipality was located to the south and west.

== Government ==
While it existed, Sande Municipality was responsible for primary education (through 10th grade), outpatient health services, senior citizen services, welfare and other social services, zoning, economic development, and municipal roads and utilities. The municipality was governed by a municipal council of directly elected representatives. The mayor was indirectly elected by a vote of the municipal council. The municipality was under the jurisdiction of the Drammen District Court and the Borgarting Court of Appeal.

=== Municipal council ===
The municipal council (Kommunestyre) of Sande Municipality was made up of 25 representatives that were elected to four-year terms. The tables below show the historical composition of the council by political party.

Sande kommunestyre 2015–2019
Party name (in Norwegian)	Number of representatives
Labour Party (Arbeiderpartiet)	8
Progress Party (Fremskrittspartiet)	5
Conservative Party (Høyre)	5
Centre Party (Senterpartiet)	3
Socialist Left Party (Sosialistisk Venstreparti)	1
Liberal Party (Venstre)	2
Sande Cross-Party Local List (Sande tverrpolitiske bygdeliste)	1
Total number of members:	25
Note: On 1 January 2020, Sande Municipality became part of Holmestrand Municipality.

Sande kommunestyre 2011–2015
Party name (in Norwegian)	Number of representatives
Labour Party (Arbeiderpartiet)	13
Progress Party (Fremskrittspartiet)	3
Conservative Party (Høyre)	4
Christian Democratic Party (Kristelig Folkeparti)	1
Centre Party (Senterpartiet)	2
Liberal Party (Venstre)	2
Total number of members:	25

Sande kommunestyre 2007–2011
Party name (in Norwegian)	Number of representatives
Labour Party (Arbeiderpartiet)	12
Progress Party (Fremskrittspartiet)	5
Conservative Party (Høyre)	3
Christian Democratic Party (Kristelig Folkeparti)	1
Centre Party (Senterpartiet)	2
Socialist Left Party (Sosialistisk Venstreparti)	1
Liberal Party (Venstre)	1
Total number of members:	25

Sande kommunestyre 2003–2007
Party name (in Norwegian)	Number of representatives
Labour Party (Arbeiderpartiet)	12
Progress Party (Fremskrittspartiet)	5
Conservative Party (Høyre)	3
Christian Democratic Party (Kristelig Folkeparti)	1
Centre Party (Senterpartiet)	2
Socialist Left Party (Sosialistisk Venstreparti)	2
Total number of members:	25

Sande kommunestyre 1999–2003
Party name (in Norwegian)	Number of representatives
Labour Party (Arbeiderpartiet)	11
Progress Party (Fremskrittspartiet)	4
Conservative Party (Høyre)	5
Christian Democratic Party (Kristelig Folkeparti)	1
Centre Party (Senterpartiet)	2
Socialist Left Party (Sosialistisk Venstreparti)	1
Liberal Party (Venstre)	1
Total number of members:	25

Sande kommunestyre 1995–1999
Party name (in Norwegian)	Number of representatives
Labour Party (Arbeiderpartiet)	11
Progress Party (Fremskrittspartiet)	4
Conservative Party (Høyre)	4
Christian Democratic Party (Kristelig Folkeparti)	1
Centre Party (Senterpartiet)	3
Socialist Left Party (Sosialistisk Venstreparti)	1
Liberal Party (Venstre)	1
Total number of members:	25

Sande kommunestyre 1991–1995
Party name (in Norwegian)	Number of representatives
Labour Party (Arbeiderpartiet)	10
Progress Party (Fremskrittspartiet)	2
Conservative Party (Høyre)	6
Christian Democratic Party (Kristelig Folkeparti)	1
Centre Party (Senterpartiet)	4
Socialist Left Party (Sosialistisk Venstreparti)	2
Total number of members:	25

Sande kommunestyre 1987–1991
Party name (in Norwegian)	Number of representatives
Labour Party (Arbeiderpartiet)	11
Progress Party (Fremskrittspartiet)	4
Conservative Party (Høyre)	6
Joint list of the Centre Party (Senterpartiet), Christian Democratic Party (Kristelig Folkeparti), Liberal People's Party (Liberale Folkepartiet), and Liberal Party (Venstre)	4
Total number of members:	25

Sande kommunestyre 1983–1987
Party name (in Norwegian)	Number of representatives
Labour Party (Arbeiderpartiet)	13
Progress Party (Fremskrittspartiet)	2
Conservative Party (Høyre)	6
Christian Democratic Party (Kristelig Folkeparti)	1
Centre Party (Senterpartiet)	3
Total number of members:	25

Sande kommunestyre 1979–1983
Party name (in Norwegian)	Number of representatives
Labour Party (Arbeiderpartiet)	13
Conservative Party (Høyre)	6
Christian Democratic Party (Kristelig Folkeparti)	1
Centre Party (Senterpartiet)	4
Joint list of the Liberal Party (Venstre) and New People's Party (Nye Folkepartiet)	1
Total number of members:	25

Sande kommunestyre 1975–1979
Party name (in Norwegian)	Number of representatives
Labour Party (Arbeiderpartiet)	14
Conservative Party (Høyre)	4
Christian Democratic Party (Kristelig Folkeparti)	1
Centre Party (Senterpartiet)	5
Joint list of the Liberal Party (Venstre) and New People's Party (Nye Folkepartiet)	1
Total number of members:	25

Sande kommunestyre 1971–1975
Party name (in Norwegian)	Number of representatives
Labour Party (Arbeiderpartiet)	15
Conservative Party (Høyre)	3
Christian Democratic Party (Kristelig Folkeparti)	1
Centre Party (Senterpartiet)	6
Total number of members:	25

Sande kommunestyre 1967–1971
Party name (in Norwegian)	Number of representatives
Labour Party (Arbeiderpartiet)	14
Conservative Party (Høyre)	3
Christian Democratic Party (Kristelig Folkeparti)	1
Centre Party (Senterpartiet)	6
Socialist People's Party (Sosialistisk Folkeparti)	1
Total number of members:	25

Sande kommunestyre 1963–1967
Party name (in Norwegian)	Number of representatives
Labour Party (Arbeiderpartiet)	16
Conservative Party (Høyre)	3
Christian Democratic Party (Kristelig Folkeparti)	1
Centre Party (Senterpartiet)	5
Total number of members:	25

Sande herredsstyre 1959–1963
Party name (in Norwegian)	Number of representatives
Labour Party (Arbeiderpartiet)	14
Conservative Party (Høyre)	4
Christian Democratic Party (Kristelig Folkeparti)	1
Centre Party (Senterpartiet)	6
Total number of members:	25

Sande herredsstyre 1955–1959
Party name (in Norwegian)	Number of representatives
Labour Party (Arbeiderpartiet)	13
Conservative Party (Høyre)	4
Communist Party (Kommunistiske Parti)	1
Christian Democratic Party (Kristelig Folkeparti)	2
Farmers' Party (Bondepartiet)	5
Total number of members:	25

Sande herredsstyre 1951–1955
Party name (in Norwegian)	Number of representatives
Labour Party (Arbeiderpartiet)	14
Conservative Party (Høyre)	4
Communist Party (Kommunistiske Parti)	1
Christian Democratic Party (Kristelig Folkeparti)	1
Farmers' Party (Bondepartiet)	4
Total number of members:	24

Sande herredsstyre 1947–1951
Party name (in Norwegian)	Number of representatives
Labour Party (Arbeiderpartiet)	12
Communist Party (Kommunistiske Parti)	1
Joint List(s) of Non-Socialist Parties (Borgerlige Felleslister)	11
Total number of members:	24

Sande herredsstyre 1945–1947
Party name (in Norwegian)	Number of representatives
Labour Party (Arbeiderpartiet)	12
Communist Party (Kommunistiske Parti)	2
Christian Democratic Party (Kristelig Folkeparti)	2
Farmers' Party (Bondepartiet)	5
Local List(s) (Lokale lister)	3
Total number of members:	24

Sande herredsstyre 1937–1941*
Party name (in Norwegian)	Number of representatives
Labour Party (Arbeiderpartiet)	12
Farmers' Party (Bondepartiet)	7
Local List(s) (Lokale lister)	5
Total number of members:	24
Note: Due to the German occupation of Norway during World War II, no elections were held for new municipal councils until after the war ended in 1945.

=== Mayors ===
The mayor (Norwegian: ordfører) of Sande Municipality was the political leader of the municipality and the chairperson of the municipal council. The following people have held this position:

- 1838–1839: Captain Beichmann
- 1840–1843: Captain Schrøder
- 1844–1845: Halvor Olsen Rud
- 1846–1847: Lars Jørgensen Holst
- 1848–1851: Hans Tømmeraas
- 1852–1855: Hans Thoresen
- 1856–1857: Johan Thingelstad
- 1858–1861: Lars Holst
- 1862–1865: Bent Aasnæs
- 1866–1869: Stillef Breda
- 1870–1877: Otto Galleberg
- 1878–1881: Lars Windern
- 1882–1897: Johan Thingelstad
- 1898–1899: Lars Windern
- 1899–1901: Sven Aarrestad
- 1902–1904: Hans Gravningen
- 1905–1907: Sven Aarrestad
- 1908–1910: Otto Bonden (SmP)
- 1911–1913: Reier Kjeldaas (H)
- 1914–1916: Emil Mørkassel (V)
- 1917–1925: Hans Aasnæs (H)
- 1926-1926: Johannes Utne
- 1927–1928: Reier Kjeldaas (H)
- 1929–1934: Karl Stampe (Bp)
- 1935–1936: Evald Nilsen (Ap)
- 1936–1937: Ole Kjennerud (Ap)
- 1938–1941: Albert Pedersen (Ap)
- 1945-1945: Albert Pedersen (Ap)
- 1946–1951: Herman Trolsrud (Ap)
- 1952–1953: Karl Demberg (Ap)
- 1954–1955: Karsten Dalsrud (Ap)
- 1956–1979: Hans K. Evensen (Ap)
- 1980–1987: Erling Bamrud (Ap)
- 1988–1989: Sverre K. Nedberg (H)
- 1990–1991: Knut H. Slevigen (H)
- 1991–2015: Karl Einar Haslestad (Ap)
- 2015–2019: Elin G. Weggesrud (Ap)

== Sister cities ==
Sande once had sister city agreements with the following places:

- Akaa, Western Finland, Finland
- Klippan, Skåne County, Sweden

== Notable people ==
- Rune Høydahl, a former silver medalist in the World Mountain Bike Championship
- Anne-Sofie Østvedt (1920–2009), a Norvegian Resistance Member

== See also ==
- List of former municipalities of Norway
