= 2018 Norwegian Athletics Championships =

- Dates: 17–19 August
- Host city: Gloppen, Norway
- Venue: Byrkjelo Stadium
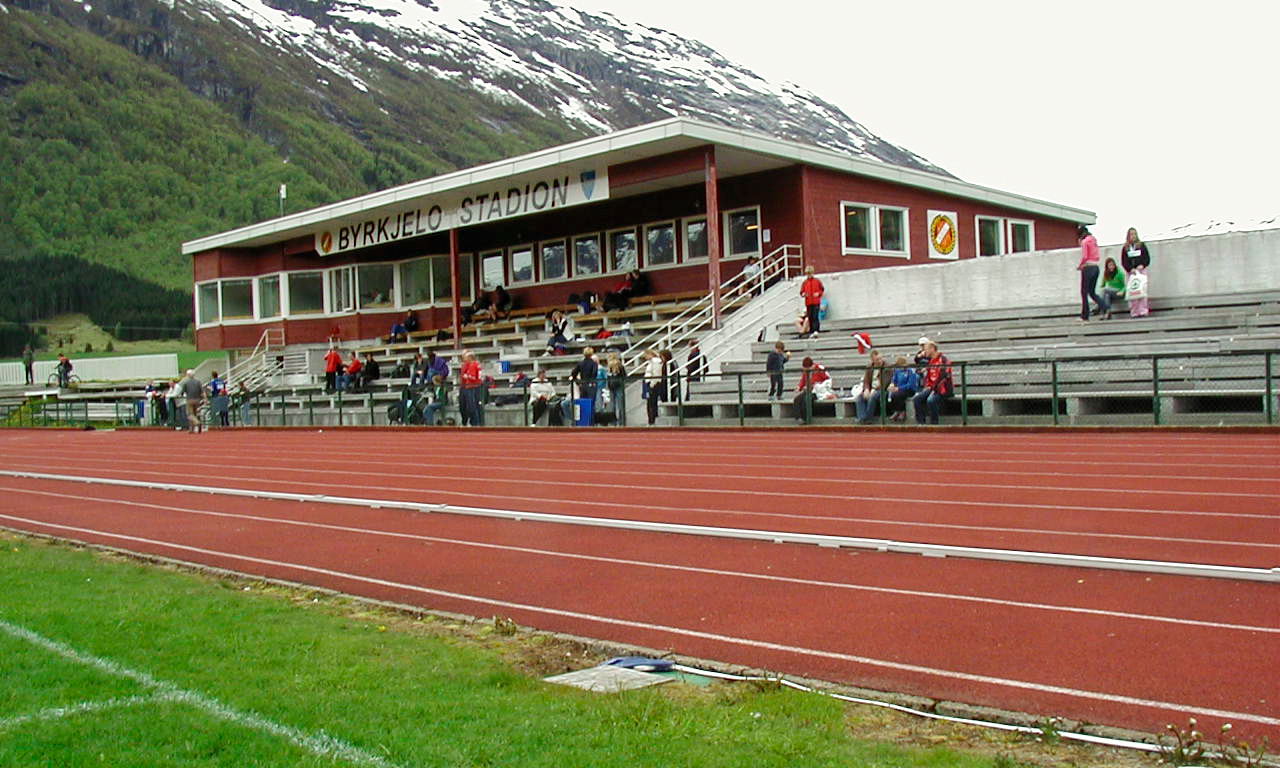

The 2018 Norwegian Athletics Championships (Norwegian: NM i friidrett 2018) was the year's national outdoor track and field championships for Norway. It was held from 17–19 August at the Byrkjelo Stadium in Gloppen Municipality. The King's trophy was awarded to women's javelin thrower Sigrid Borge and Karsten Warholm, who won both the men's 400 m hurdles and sprint events.

== Results ==
=== Men ===
| Event | Gold | | Silver | | Bronze | |
|---|---|---|---|---|---|---|
| 100 metres | Jonathan Quarcoo; FIK Orion | 10.70 | Mathias Hove Johansen; Idrettslaget Skjalg | 10.86 | Jonas Tapani Halonen; Tyrving IL | 10.94 |
| 200 metres | Jonathan Quarcoo; FIK Orion | 20.84 | Mathias Hove Johansen; Idrettslaget Skjalg | 21.44 | Muhammed Dodou Jatta; Norna-Salhus IL Joachim Sandberg; Sandnes IL | 21.57 |
| 400 metres | Karsten Warholm; Dimna IL | 47.32 | Mike Lubsen; Idrettslaget Skjalg | 48.24 | Fredrik Gerhardsen Øvereng; Overhalla IL | 48.83 |
| 800 metres | Thomas Arne Roth; Ullensaker/Kisa IL | 1:50.63 | Filip Ingebrigtsen; Sandnes IL | 1:50.78 | Markus Einan; Ullensaker/Kisa IL | 1:51.02 |
| 1500 metres | Jakob Ingebrigtsen; Sandnes IL | 4:03.54 | Ferdinand Kvan Edman; IK Tjalve | 4:06.44 | Mats Hauge; IL Gular | 4:07.41 |
| 5000 metres | Henrik Ingebrigtsen; Sandnes IL | 14:13.80 | Ørjan Grønnevig; Stavanger FIK | 14:22.06 | Tom Erling Kårbø; Stord IL | 14:25.69 |
| 10,000 metres | Okubamichael Fissehatsion; IK Tjalve | 29:34.99 | Frew Zenebe Brkineh; Sandnes IL | 29:44.17 | Marius Øyre Vedvik; IL Gular | 29:45.98 |
| 110 m hurdles | Vladimir Vukicevic; Sportsklubben Vidar | 13.84 | Håvard Becker; Sem IF | 15.33 | Gjert Høie Sjursen; IL Gneist | 16.38 |
| 400 m hurdles | Karsten Warholm; Dimna IL | 49.01 | Øyvind Strømmen Kjerpeset; Florø TIF | 52.22 | Joachim Sandberg; Sandnes IL | 53.34 |
| 3000 m s'chase | Tom Erling Kårbø; Stord IL | 8:58.49 | Abduljaleel Mohamoud Ismail Hir; Selsbakk IF | 9:16.51 | Fredrik Sandvik; Askim IF | 9:25.05 |
| 5000 m walk | Håvard Haukenes; Norna-Salhus IL | 19:41.20 | Tobias Lømo; IK Tjalve | 24:24.63 | Only two finishers | |
| Long jump | Henrik Flåtnes; Tønsberg Friidrettsklubb | 7.51 m | Martin Roe; FRI IL | 7.39 m | Amund Høie Sjursen; IL Gneist | 7.20 m |
| High jump | Erlend Bolstad Raa; Fana IL | 2.00 m | Frederik Jahr; Tyrving IL | 2.00 m | Vetle Raa Ellingsen; Fana IL Lars Vikan Rise; Nidelv IL | 2.00 m |
| Triple jump | Ingar Kiplesund; Trondheim Friidrett | 14.83 m | Jesper Vestbø; IK Tjalve | 14.70 m | Sindre Almsengen; IK Tjalve | 14.65 m |
| Pole vault | Sondre Guttormsen; Ski IL | 5.50 m | Eirik Greibrokk Dolve; Fana IL | 5.20 m | Andreas Fernandes Thomaz Gjesdal; IK Tjalve | 4.80 m |
| Shot put | Marcus Thomsen; IK Tjalve | 19.82 m | Sven Martin Skagestad; Norna-Salhus IL | 18.04 m | Ola Stunes Isene; Sturla IF | 17.20 m |
| Discus throw | Ola Stunes Isene; Sturla IF | 60.46 m | Sven Martin Skagestad; Norna-Salhus IL | 60.37 m | Fredrik Amundgård; Tyrving IL | 56.13 m |
| Javelin throw | Gardar Fridriksson; Norna-Salhus IL | 64.99 m | Alexander Skorpen; Halden IL | 64.63 m | Donavan Miloss; FIK Orion | 64.12 m |
| Hammer throw | Eivind Henriksen; IK Tjalve | 74.27 m | Thomas Mardal; Gloppen FIL | 70.01 m | Evald Osnes Devik; Gloppen FIL | 60.53 m |

=== Women ===
| Event | Gold | | Silver | | Bronze | |
|---|---|---|---|---|---|---|
| 100 metres | Ezinne Okparaebo; Norna-Salhus IL | 11.68 | Ingvild Meinseth; Sørild FIK | 12.30 | Mari Gilde Brubak; Trondheim Friidrett | 12.34 |
| 200 metres | Line Kloster; Sportsklubben Vidar | 24.03 | Christine Bjelland Jensen; IL Gular | 24.26 | Marte Pettersen; Trondheim Friidrett | 24.49 |
| 400 metres | Amalie Iuel; Tyrving IL | 54.68 | Sara Dorthea Jensen; Kristiansands IF | 54.89 | Hedda Hynne; Strindheim IL | 56.41 |
| 800 metres | Hedda Hynne; Strindheim IL | 2:06.97 | Amalie Manshaus Sæten; Ullensaker/Kisa IL | 2:07.63 | Yngvild Elvemo; IL i BUL | 2:07.80 |
| 1500 metres | Sigrid Jervell Våg; IL i BUL | 4:31.14 | Yngvild Elvemo; IL i BUL | 4:31.75 | Christina Maria Toogood; Sandnes IL | 4:32.77 |
| 5000 metres | Sigrid Jervell Våg; IL i BUL | 16:19.14 | Vienna Søyland Dahle; Idrettslaget Skjalg | 16:19.28 | Pernilla Eugenie Epland; Stord IL | 16:21.38 |
| 10,000 metres | Pernilla Eugenie Epland; Stord IL | 34:04.98 | Maria Sagnes Wågan; Namdal løpeklubb | 34:10.11 | Vienna Søyland Dahle; Idrettslaget Skjalg | 34:57.00 |
| 100 m hurdles | Isabelle Pedersen; IL i BUL | 13.04 | Agathe Holtan Wathne; Sandnes IL | 13.85 | Marlén Aakre; Fredrikstad IF | 14.00 |
| 400 m hurdles | Line Kloster; Sportsklubben Vidar | 58.64 | Marlén Aakre; Fredrikstad IF | 59.16 | Solveig Hernandez Vråle; IL Sandvin | 59.17 |
| 3000 m s'chase | Delphine Poirot; IL i BUL | 11:29.46 | Only one finisher | | | |
| 3000 m walk | Merete Helgheim; Gloppen FIL | 13:55.77 | Siri Gamst Glittenberg; Laksevåg TIL | 14:51.79 | Fride Møller Flatin; Dimna IL | 14:54.49 |
| Long jump | Oda Utsi Onstad; Norna-Salhus IL | 6.25 m | Kristina Stensvoll Reppe; Ranheim IL | 6.00 m | Sigrid Kleive; Ålesund FIK | 5.72 m |
| High jump | Tonje Angelsen; IK Tjalve | 1.85 m | Karen Høystad; Lillehammer IF | 1.70 m | Elise Martinsen Nedberg; IL Sandvin | 1.70 m |
| Triple jump | Oda Utsi Onstad; Norna-Salhus IL | 13.33 m | Chiamaka Okparaebo; IL i BUL | 12.87 m | Monika Elisabeth Benserud; IL Gneist | 12.85 m |
| Pole vault | * Birgitte Kjuus; Ullensaker/Kisa IL | 3.90 m | Lene Retzius; IL i BUL | 3.90 m | Hedda Marie Kjølberg Hauge; Ski IL | 3.50 m |
| Shot put | Matilde Roe; FRI IL | 13.39 m | Mona Ekroll Jaidi; Norna-Salhus IL | 12.66 m | Marit Jørgenrud; Spydeberg IL | 11.88 m |
| Discus throw | Mona Ekroll Jaidi; Norna-Salhus IL | 50.27 m | Grete Etholm; IK Tjalve | 47.09 m | Else Lundestad Bakkelid; Gloppen FIL | 46.95 m |
| Javelin throw | Sigrid Borge; Osterøy IL | 60.70 m | Ane Dahlen; Tyrving IL | 51.91 m | Kristina Kristianslund; Bækkelagets SK | 50.93 m |
| Hammer throw | Trude Raad; Gloppen FIL | 63.96 m | Beatrice Nedberge Llano; Laksevåg TIL | 63.31 m | Helene Sofie Slottholm Ingvaldsen; Norna-Salhus IL | 56.75 m |
