= Botne Municipality =

Former municipality in Norway

Botne Municipality Botne herred
- Former municipality
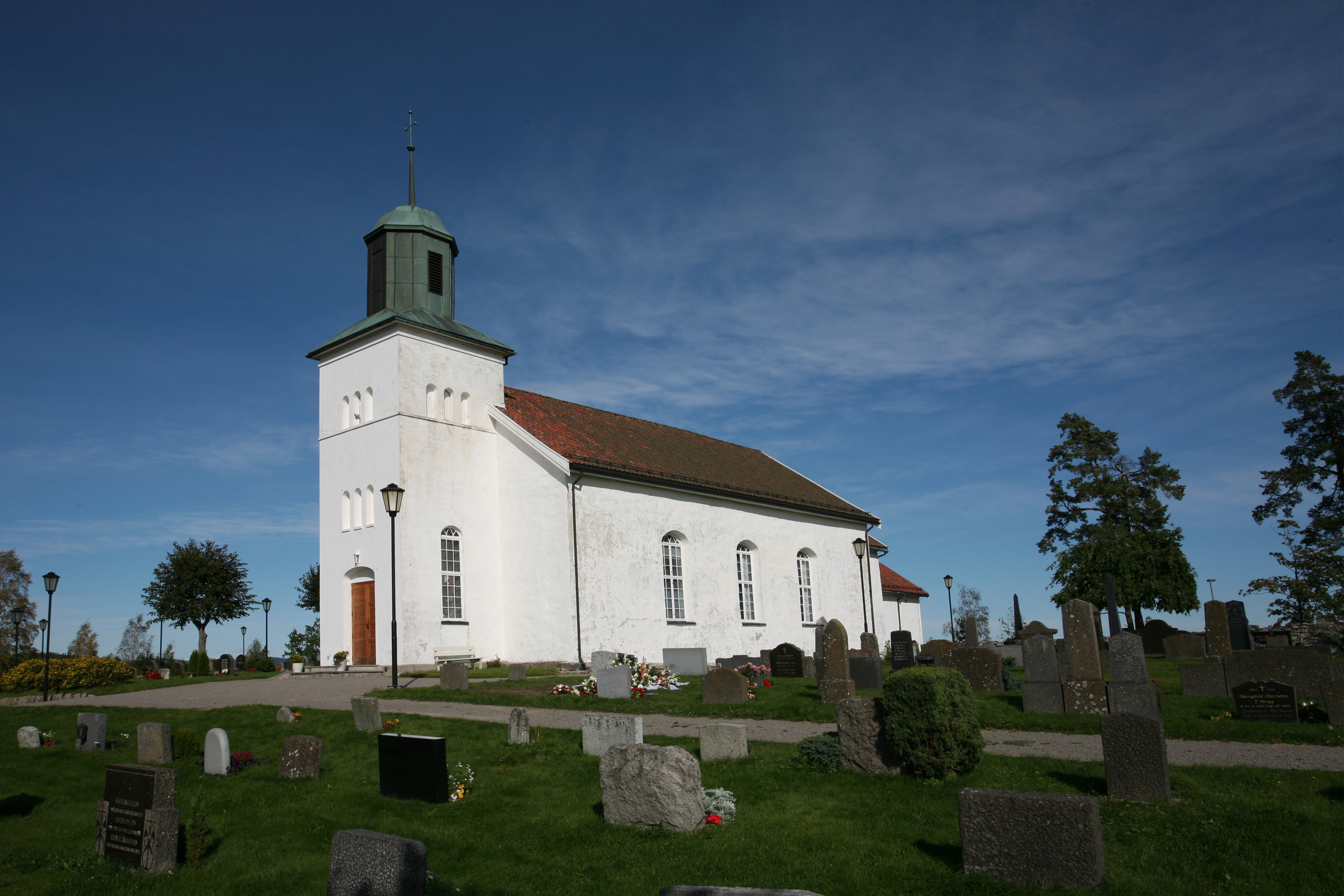
- View of Botne Church

- Vestfold within Norway

- Botne within Vestfold
- Coordinates: 59°28′46″N 10°16′49″E
- Country: Norway
- County: Vestfold
- District: Jarlsberg
- Established: 1 Jan 1838
  - Created as: Formannskapsdistrikt
- Disestablished: 1 Jan 1964
  - Succeeded by: Holmestrand Municipality
- Administrative centre: Botne

Government
  - Mayor (1956–1963): Halfdan Kongsten (Ap)

Area (upon dissolution)
  - Total: 85.4 km^{2} (33.0 sq mi)
  - Rank: #539 in Norway
- Highest elevation (Hvittingen): 403.6 m (1,324 ft)

Population (1963)
  - Total: 4,561
  - Rank: #195 in Norway
  - Density: 53.4/km^{2} (138/sq mi)
  - Change (10 years): ▲ +24.9%
- Demonym: Botne-folk

Official language
  - Norwegian form: Bokmål
- Time zone: UTC+01:00 (CET)
  - Summer (DST): UTC+02:00 (CEST)
- ISO 3166 code: NO-0715

Botne (Norwegian pronunciation: [ˈbʊ̂tnə]; locally [ˈbɔ̂tnæ]) is a former municipality in Vestfold county, Norway. The 85.4-square-kilometre (33.0 sq mi) municipality existed from 1838 until its dissolution in 1964. The area is now part of Holmestrand Municipality in the traditional district of Jarlsberg. The administrative centre was the village of Botne where the Botne Church is located. Other villages in the municipality included Hillestad and Gullhaug.

Prior to its dissolution in 1964, the 85.4-square-kilometre (33.0 sq mi) municipality was the 539th largest by area out of the 689 municipalities in Norway. Botne Municipality was the 195th most populous municipality in Norway with a population of about 4,561. The municipality's population density was 53.4 inhabitants per square kilometre (138/sq mi) and its population had increased by 24.9% over the previous 10-year period.

== General information ==
=== Administrative history ===
The formannskapsdistrikt law of 1837 created a system of local government in Norway by establishing each town (ladested or kjøpstad) and each Church of Norway prestegjeld as a civil municipality. On 1 January 1838, Botne prestegjeld was established as Botne Municipality. The initial population of Botne Municipality was about 1,600 residents. In 1942, an area of Botne Municipality (population: 148) was transferred into the neighboring Holmestrand Municipality. In 1947, an area of Botne Municipality (population: 8) was transferred to the neighboring Våle Municipality.

During the 1960s, there were many municipal mergers across Norway due to the work of the Schei Committee. On 1 January 1964, Botne Municipality (population: 4,656) was dissolved and merged with Holmestrand Municipality (population: 1,956) to form an enlarged Holmestrand Municipality.

=== Name ===
The municipality is named after the old Botne prestegjeld. The prestegjeld was named after the old Botne farm (Old Norse: Botnar) since the first Botne Church was built there. The name is the plural form of botn which means "bottom", "hollow", or "depression".

=== Churches ===
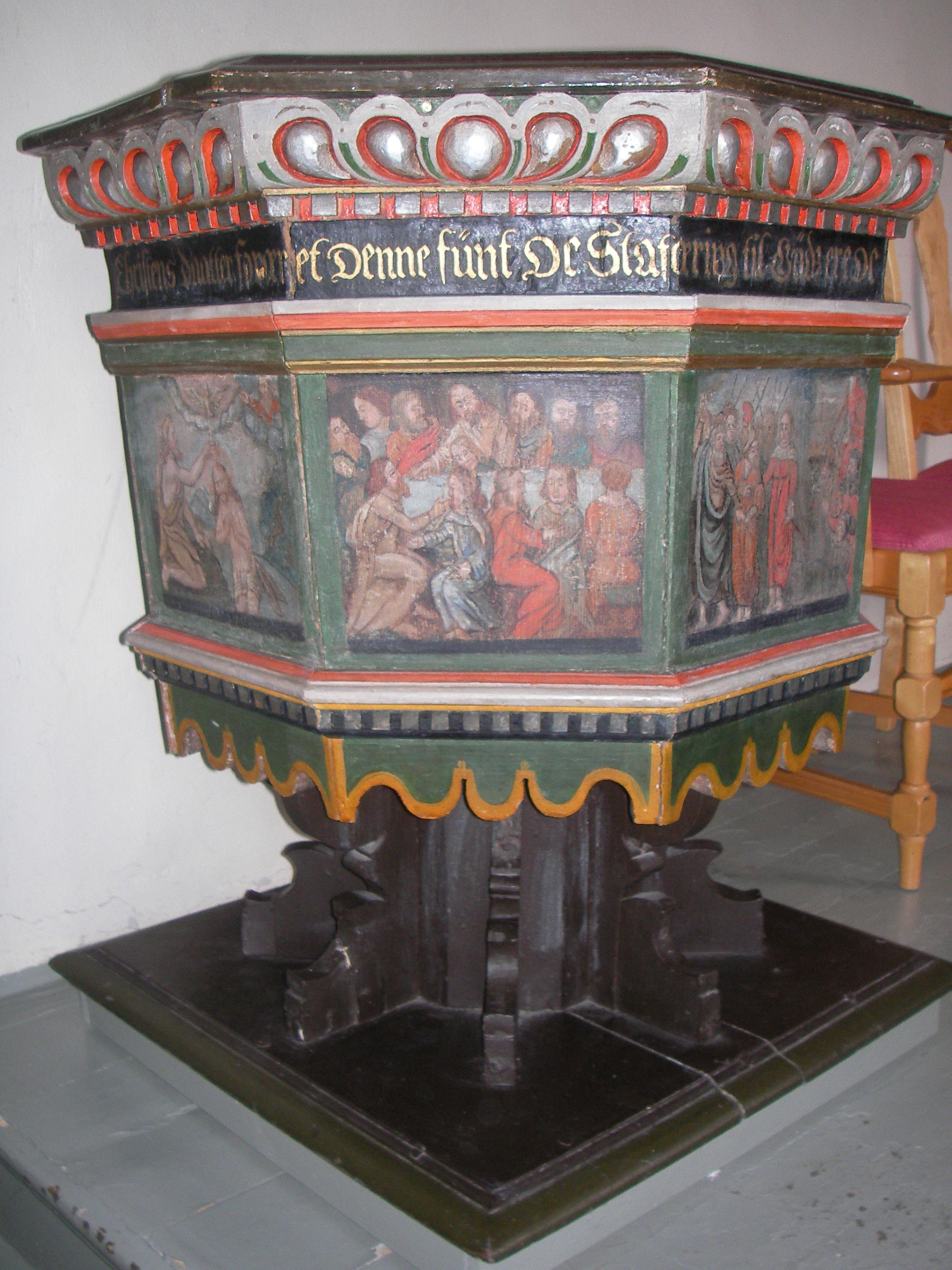
Baptismal font in Botne Church

The Church of Norway had two parishes (sokn) within Botne Municipality. At the time of the municipal dissolution, it was part of the Botne prestegjeld and the Nord-Jarlsberg prosti (deanery) in the Diocese of Tunsberg.

Churches in Botne Municipality
Parish (sokn)	Church name	Location of the church	Year built
Botne	Botne Church	Botne	c. 1200
Hillestad	Hillestad Church	Hillestad	1724

Botne Church (Botne kirke) is a stone church from the 13th century that is dedicated to St. Nicholas. There is rectangular nave and lower and narrower choir. The Renaissance / Baroque altarpiece is from 1664 and consists of four pictures from the gospels. The pulpit is from 1634 with five subjects with evangelists and painted in large fields. The baptismal font is also from the 1600s and has an octagonal basin with painted biblical scenes on four sides.

== Geography ==
The highest point in the municipality was the 403.6-metre (1,324 ft) tall mountain Hvittingen, located along the northern border with Sande Municipality. Sande Municipality was located to the north, Holmestrand Municipality was located to the east, Våle Municipality was located to the south, Ramnes Municipality was located to the southwest, and Hof Municipality was located to the west.

== Government ==
While it existed, Botne Municipality was responsible for primary education (through 10th grade), outpatient health services, senior citizen services, welfare and other social services, zoning, economic development, and municipal roads and utilities. The municipality was governed by a municipal council of directly elected representatives. The mayor was indirectly elected by a vote of the municipal council. The municipality was under the jurisdiction of the Holmestrand District Court and the Agder Court of Appeal.

=== Municipal council ===
The municipal council (Herredsstyre) of Botne Municipality was made up of 21 representatives that were elected to four year terms. The tables below show the historical composition of the council by political party.

Botne herredsstyre 1959–1963
Party name (in Norwegian)	Number of representatives
Labour Party (Arbeiderpartiet)	13
Conservative Party (Høyre)	3
Christian Democratic Party (Kristelig Folkeparti)	1
Centre Party (Senterpartiet)	4
Total number of members:	21
Note: On 1 January 1964, Botne Municipality became part of Holmestrand Municipality.

Botne herredsstyre 1955–1959
Party name (in Norwegian)	Number of representatives
Labour Party (Arbeiderpartiet)	12
Conservative Party (Høyre)	3
Christian Democratic Party (Kristelig Folkeparti)	2
Farmers' Party (Bondepartiet)	3
Liberal Party (Venstre)	1
Total number of members:	21

Botne herredsstyre 1951–1955
Party name (in Norwegian)	Number of representatives
Labour Party (Arbeiderpartiet)	11
Christian Democratic Party (Kristelig Folkeparti)	2
Joint List(s) of Non-Socialist Parties (Borgerlige Felleslister)	7
Total number of members:	20

Botne herredsstyre 1947–1951
Party name (in Norwegian)	Number of representatives
Labour Party (Arbeiderpartiet)	8
Christian Democratic Party (Kristelig Folkeparti)	2
Joint List(s) of Non-Socialist Parties (Borgerlige Felleslister)	10
Total number of members:	20

Botne herredsstyre 1945–1947
Party name (in Norwegian)	Number of representatives
Labour Party (Arbeiderpartiet)	10
Communist Party (Kommunistiske Parti)	1
Christian Democratic Party (Kristelig Folkeparti)	2
Joint List(s) of Non-Socialist Parties (Borgerlige Felleslister)	7
Total number of members:	20

Botne herredsstyre 1937–1941*
Party name (in Norwegian)	Number of representatives
Labour Party (Arbeiderpartiet)	10
Joint List(s) of Non-Socialist Parties (Borgerlige Felleslister)	10
Total number of members:	20
Note: Due to the German occupation of Norway during World War II, no elections were held for new municipal councils until after the war ended in 1945.

=== Mayors ===
The mayor (Norwegian: ordfører) of Botne Municipality was the political leader of the municipality and the chairperson of the municipal council. The following people have held this position:

- 1838–1847: Peder Mandrup Tuxen Abel
- 1848–1856: Hans J. N. Hillestad
- 1856–1859: Johan H. Ramberg
- 1860–1861: Anders J. Myhre
- 1862–1863: Peder P. Ramberg
- 1864–1865: Johan Henningsen Ramberg
- 1866–1869: Peder Cappelen Ottesen
- 1870–1871: Anders Sv. Rønningen
- 1872–1873: Olaus Chr. Hårjord
- 1874–1879: Theodor L. Bjerke
- 1880–1887: Abraham L. Hillestad
- 1888–1895: Jess D. Koren
- 1896–1897: Henning P. Løvald
- 1898–1898: Newton T. Kalleberg
- 1899–1904: Kristen Skarrebo
- 1905–1907: Hans Backe
- 1908–1913: Johan Kiste
- 1914–1919: Hans Strandenæs (H)
- 1920–1922: Aksel Jensen Foss
- 1923–1928: Hans Strandenæs (H)
- 1929–1934: Halvard Christian Sollie (Bp)
- 1935–1947: Paul Seljeseth (Ap)
- 1948–1951: Einar Weltzien (Bp)
- 1952–1955: Paul Seljeseth (Ap)
- 1956–1963: Halfdan Kongsten (Ap)

== See also ==
- List of former municipalities of Norway
