= Sande Paper Mill =

Norwegian paper company

- Formerly: Sande Tresliperi; A/S Skollenborg; Selvik Bruk
- Type: Aksjeselskap
- Industry: Pulp and paper
- Founded: Sande Tresliperi, 1900; Sande Paper Mill, 1960
- Defunct: Sande Tresliperi, 1981; Sande Paper Mill, 2002
- Fate: Bankruptcy
- Headquarters: Sande, Vestfold, Norway
- Products: Wood pulp, fluting

Sande Paper Mill in Sande in Vestfold was a Norwegian paper factory. It originated in Sande Tresliperi, established in 1900. The paper factory was founded in 1960 as a separate company, producing paper for the middle layer of corrugated fiberboard, about 80,000 tonnes a year, most of it for export. Sande Tresliperi was closed in 1981 and Sande Paper Mill went bankrupt in 2002.

Sande Tresliperi was a notable company in the Norwegian wood pulp industry. From its founding as a small mill with a capacity of about 4,000 tonnes of wet wood pulp, it was by the time of its closure among the country's largest sales mills. It was also the only mill in Norway that was attempted run on steam power. The company became the area's foremost employer and a cornerstone business for Sande. The site today is an apartment complex named Nordre Jarlsberg Brygge.

== History ==
Sande Tresliperi was built as a hot-grinding mill in 1900 by the forest owner William Stibolt. This method, fairly new in the Norwegian wood pulp industry, required a steady and large supply of power, which the mill did not have, and the power potential of the Selvik watercourse had probably been overestimated. This difficult situation was the reason Sande Tresliperi was the only Norwegian mill where steam power was used on a regular basis. But with coal-fired and expensive steam power, one of the most important advantages of the Norwegian grinding industry, cheap waterpower, was lost, so steam power was used only until a power station at Gravenfossen was ready, around 1910.

Sande Tresliperi was built right at the water's edge by the Oslofjord, in a location that was largely ice-free, which gave the company great potential advantages for transporting timber to and wood pulp from the factory. The mills of the 1860s and 1870s mostly lay where the waterfalls and forest were, and had to use the railway for part of their transport. The company grew to become the dominant workplace in Sande, with the mill at the core of a fairly one-sided company town, though the distance to the towns of Vestfold and eastern Norway was not great. In the autumn of 1935 the company started its own shipping line with two ships running between Sande and the coast of England. In the postwar period the quay was expanded several times, as in connection with the building of Sande Paper Mill, when it was made ready for 10,000-tonne cargo ships.

=== Changes of ownership ===
Start-up difficulties contributed strongly to Stibolt's eventual bankruptcy in 1913. Stibolt's idea had been to use his forest properties in the district for wood processing, and he also founded the mill at Tronstad Bruk in Lier. The company was reorganized as a joint-stock company in 1910 under the name A/S Skollenborg. That year it bought waterfall rights at Gravenfossen in the Numedalslågen and in time entered the electricity supply of Vestfold; other mills at this time also supplied power to nearby towns, such as Vittingfoss, Labro Træsliberi, and Glommens Træsliberi.

For a brief period between 1918 and 1920, A/S Skollenborg was controlled by the landowner Treschow of Larvik, who sold the power company to Vestfold county. In the summer of 1920 the mill was sold to a consortium led by the manager of Vittingfoss Tresliperi, Einar Wahlstrøm.

=== Connection to the British market ===
With this, Sande Tresliperi was woven into a network of connections whose common denominator was the large English newspaper house and paper producer Edward Lloyd Ltd. (later Bowater, now Resolute Forest Products). Lloyd had owned both Vittingfoss and Hønefos Brug, and Einar Wahlstrøm's father, August Wahlstrøm, had been responsible for running them.

After the First World War, Lloyd was less interested in owning Norwegian mills and paper factories but still maintained supplies from Norway. Einar Wahlstrøm arranged a long-term contract, and Lloyd took the great majority of production from 1923 to 1940. This stable outlet was an important reason Sande Tresliperi was less affected by the interwar crises than many others; on the contrary, this was a time of expansion, and from 1923 to 1930 alone capacity was doubled. The number of workers grew from 60 in 1920 to about 100 in 1939. Sande Tresliperi, which had had a great many ownership constellations in its first twenty years, was controlled by the Wahlstrøm family for the next fifty or so, and the close ties to British paper industry were maintained.

In 1974 the family sold Sande Tresliperi to Union. According to the historian Ingar Kaldal, there was marked skepticism among the workers toward this takeover, as they suspected that the mill's timber quotas were the real object of the deal. Union closed production at the mill after seven years.

=== From wood pulp to packaging ===
Sande Paper Mill was established in 1960 as an integrated factory with both a cellulose plant and paper production. The owner of Sande Tresliperi, Arild Wahlstrøm, got the idea for the paper factory on a trip to the United States and Canada just after the Second World War. The trip had originally been meant to find new grinding machines for Sande Tresliperi, but Wahlstrøm saw for himself how the technology for paper and wood pulp processing had developed in the United States. Toward the end of the 1950s, Sande Tresliperi, in cooperation with the English Reed group, began to look at the possibility of paper production. The choice fell on fluting, and the factory took up a specialized production of semi-chemical corrugating paper for use in corrugated board; the paper from Sande Paper Mill formed the waves in the sides of the board.

The semi-chemical cellulose factory was put into use toward the end of 1961, and the paper machine, supplied by Thunes Mek. Værksted, began paper production the following year. In the early phase the market was favorable. The foreign market mattered most, and the factory exported mainly to England, while the home market was not very lucrative.

=== Recycled fiber ===
From 1965 recycled fiber was also used in production. A separate company, AWA, was organized to collect used corrugated board from across eastern Norway. In 1970 it joined with Industrifiber A/S to set up Retur-Papir A/S, which would handle the collection of paper for recycling in eastern Norway; this firm changed its name to Fibergjenvinning A/S in 1986. AWA was the start of a development that ended with production at Sande Paper Mill eventually being based on 100 percent recycled fiber. In the meantime, in 1987, the Wahlstrøm family sold Sande Paper Mill to Tofte Cellulose, which joined Norske Skog the following year.

=== Decline and bankruptcy ===
In 1997 the factory was taken over from Norske Skog by a private investor group led by Rolf Thoralfsson. At the same time the market grew difficult, and bankruptcy followed in May 2002. The company itself pointed to the costs of a new treatment plant, changes in the paper market, and the strengthening of the Norwegian krone as the causes of the closure. The area was sold to a property firm that developed it into a housing complex called Nordre Jarlsberg Brygge.

=== Trade unions ===
A trade union was founded in 1907, but little is known of its early years. The relationship between workers and management here, as elsewhere, underwent a gradual radicalization, especially in the interwar period. The company built workers' housing from 1910, and 45 "own homes" were erected between 1920 and 1945. The workers must have been well organized, holding the mayoralty in Sande municipality for many years. In 1922 and 1925, arbitration was needed to settle staffing and pay in connection with rationalizations, and an unlawful conflict arose in 1936. In its 1971 anniversary account, the management, that is the Wahlstrøm family, expressed the view that patriarchal conditions had prevailed at Sande Tresliperi, an indication that relations had changed by that point.

Sande Paper Mills Fagforening was set up when the company Sande Paper Mill A/S was created in 1962. It was closely tied to Sande Tresliperis Fagforening until that company's closure in 1981. The unions did not cooperate in wage negotiations, but often stood together on larger common questions, working closely on social matters and sharing a company doctor and nurse.

== Bibliography ==
- Kittilsen, Ingolf, ed. (1945). Sande tresliperi. En beretning om tremasseindustrien ved Selvik, Sande i Vestfold. Oslo.
- Sinding-Larsen, Henning; Wahlstrøm, Erik; Aas, Ulf (1971). Sande tresliperi 50 år – Sande Paper Mill 10 år. Oslo: Anders Wahlstrøm.
