= Katfos Fabrikker =

Norwegian pulp and paper company

- Formerly: A/S Katfos Cellulosefabrik; A/S Katfos Fabriker
- Type: Aksjeselskap
- Industry: Pulp and paper
- Founded: 1898
- Defunct: 1983
- Fate: Replaced by a plastics factory
- Headquarters: Geithus, Modum, Buskerud, Norway
- Products: Sulfite cellulose, greaseproof paper

Katfos Fabrikker was a Norwegian industrial company that produced cellulose and paper in Geithus in Modum. The company was established in 1898. The paper factory was closed in 1904, while cellulose production continued until 1980 and paper production until 1983.

== History ==
The village of Geithus, where Katfos was located, already had Drammenselven Papirfabrikker. With the newcomer Katfos, the wood-processing industry became the dominant workplace in the local community.

=== Founding phase with cellulose production ===
When Katfos Cellulosefabrik was established in 1898, it was the last wood-processing plant founded in Modum, and the only one in Modum not started as a wood-grinding mill; it went directly into cellulose production. Earnings prospects for wood pulp were poor, while cellulose offered other chances for profit, and Great Britain, France, and Germany were large buyers of sulfite cellulose from Katfos.

The initiator of the venture in Geithus was August Wahlstrøm, who was centrally involved in building several plants, not only Katfos; among other things he was manager at Hønefos Brug. The first manager at Katfos was Edvard Jørgensen. From the start the owners were gathered in a joint-stock company under the name A/S Katfos Cellulosefabrik, with a capital of 700,000 kroner divided among 200 shareholders.

In the start-up phase the factory was equipped with three boilers of 98 cubic meters' capacity, which required three steam boilers. Production began in 1899 with 80 workers. By the time the plant was running, costs had reached 1.4 million kroner, double what had been projected during planning, so the company ran into serious financial difficulties. Continued operation was impossible, and the company had to be refinanced as early as 1902.

=== Paper production ===
The firm eventually resumed operations and could plan more for the long term, and the management took the initiative to establish a paper factory, with the board member Gustav Adolf Svensen a central driving force. The factory began in 1904 with the production of fine paper (greaseproof). The historian Eli Moen attributes the move into paper to location: for cellulose producers on the coast, expanding into paper was uncommon, but for Katfos, farther inland, the transport costs for cellulose made it more natural to move on to paper production.

Expanding into paper gave companies a better chance to hold their own in the market. During this build-up period a trade union was also formed among the workers at Katfos, founded in 1906; the union held collective membership in the Norwegian Labour Party (DnA).

The paper machine was driven by electric power from the outset. Electrification of the wood-processing industry only got properly under way from 1910, so Katfos was early with electric operation of its paper machine already in 1904, and the further electrification of the factory continued step by step. Other improvements were made up to the First World War, such as the change to lined boilers in 1909 and to a pyrite furnace plant in 1913. Although the company expanded into paper and modernized the cellulose plant, it struggled financially, running at a loss every year from 1909 to 1915.

=== From wars and crises to boom ===
During the First World War prices rose considerably, including for paper. Production at Katfos increased, so that in the last year of the war it produced 7,000 tonnes of cellulose for sale and 2,000 tonnes for its own paper production, while greaseproof paper production reached 1,800 tonnes. This required more workers; in 1918 alone the factory took on 109 new ones. Wage levels also rose considerably as a result of the boom, but even large increases did not offset the general price rise, which was almost feverish.

Through the 1920s the situation changed completely. The whole industry fell into crisis in 1921, and in 1922 Katfos Cellulose had to be refinanced again. It went so far that the management planned to close the paper factory in 1926, which was only narrowly saved by Drammens Privatbank. Nor did it stop there: in 1928 the cellulose factory had to be halted for lack of timber, as Katfos could not get credit to buy timber. The whole factory was eventually leased out for two years, and when the lease ended, operations stopped entirely. In 1931 there was no activity at Katfos, and the entire firm came close to closing for good. Once again the business was rescued, this time by establishing a wholly new company; AS Katfos Fabriker was founded and resumed production in 1932, giving the company some breathing room.

Even so, the company turned a profit in only a couple of years between 1926 and the Second World War. It was also in these turbulent years, in 1923, that Katfos's union left the Norwegian Labour Party for the Communist Party of Norway (NKP).

After 1945 the factory was thoroughly modernized, both the cellulose plant and the paper factory. In 1952 the paper factory was rebuilt with a new paper machine and cutting machine, giving it a capacity of 4,000 tonnes. The plant produced about 15,500 tonnes of cellulose and 2,500 tonnes of paper, for which 140 workers were needed. Through the 1960s production rose further, and with it the number of employees, so that in 1964–1965 the plant produced over 20,000 tonnes of sulfite cellulose and 4,000 tonnes of paper with a workforce of 200.

The modernization and increased production naturally affected the demand for timber. In the early 1950s the company needed about 75,000 cubic meters a year, rising through the decade to a peak of 90,000 cubic meters, and by the mid-1960s timber consumption had risen to over 110,000 cubic meters a year. The first decades after the Second World War were marked by stability and steady progress, which was felt in the union too, where the level of conflict was considerably lower than during the troubled years of the interwar period.

=== Mergers and plastics production ===
In time the conditions for the wood-processing industry changed, as acquisitions, shifting market conditions, and rationalization affected many companies, Katfos among them. Follum bought Katfos in 1970, bringing its top management into the Follum group, and for Katfos this led to the closure of cellulose production in 1980. A further change of ownership came when Follum's stake was taken over by AS Star Paper Mill in Drammen.

Paper production was kept going until 1983, when it ended. Star Paper Mill in Drammen built a plastics factory at Katfos with 140 jobs. Katfos's union was dissolved when cellulose production stopped in 1980.

== Bibliography ==
- Gervin, Ernst, ed. (1973). A/S Follum Fabrikker. Et hundre år 1873–1973. p. 16.
- Kaldal, Ingar (1989). Papirarbeidernes historie. Norsk Papirindustriarbeiderforbund 1913–1988. Oslo, pp. 296, 320, 338, 348.
- Moen, Eli (1993). Modum – ei bygd med tre elver. Industrialiseringen av ei østlandsbygd 1870–1940. Modum, pp. 58–63, 189–195, 328–335.
- Katfos fagforening 50 år. Drammen, 1956.
- Kveseth, Per, et al. (1998). Follum 125 år. 1873–1998. Drammen, pp. 31, 4.
