= Bonden (surname) =

Bonden is a Norwegian surname. Notable people with the surname include:

- Anita Moen Bonden (born 1967), Norwegian former cross-country skier
- Otto Bonden (1858–1924), Norwegian farmer, businessperson, and politician
- Ole Kristian Bonden (born 1970), Norwegian Lutheran theologian and bishop
