= Bratseth =

Bratseth is a surname. Notable people with the surname include:

- Rune Bratseth (born 1961), Norwegian footballer
- Ingar Bratseth-Kiplesund (born 1996), Norwegian long jumper and triple jumper
