= Karl Einar Haslestad =

Norwegian politician (born 1952)

Karl Einar Haslestad (born 24 January 1952) is a Norwegian politician for the Labour Party.

He served as a deputy representative to the Norwegian Parliament from Vestfold during the terms 1981–1985, 1997–2001 and 2001–2005.

On the local level, Haslestad was the mayor of Sande Municipality from 1991-2015.
