= Ferdinand Kvan Edman =

Norwegian middle- and long-distance runner

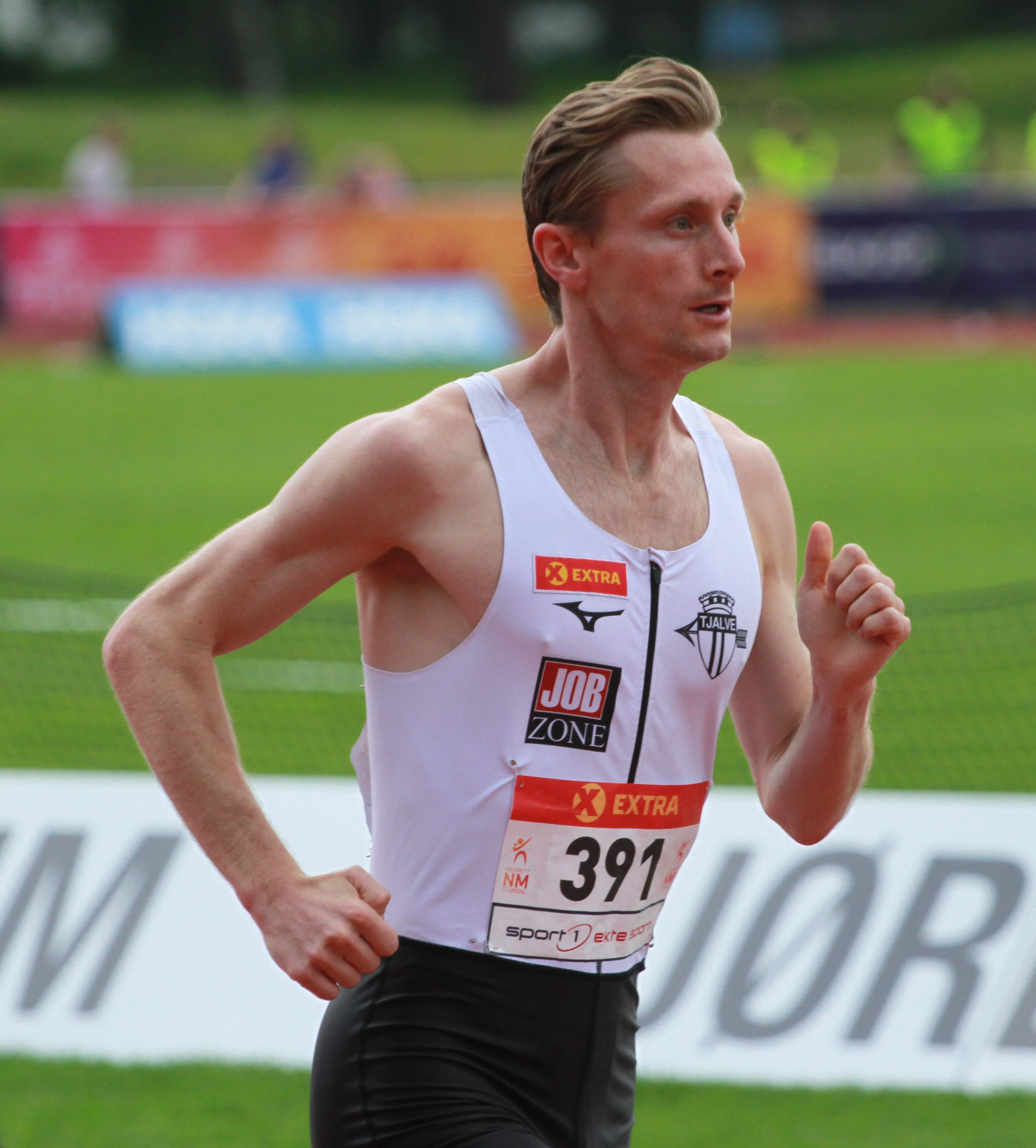
- Edman at the 2022 Norwegian Athletics Championships

Personal information
- Nationality: Norway
- Born: 12 February 1993 (33 years, 171 days old)
- Home town: Drammen, Norway
- Education: Drammen VGS; University of California, Los Angeles
- Height: 5 ft 11 in (180 cm)
- Weight: 150 lb (68 kg)

Sport
- Sport: Athletics
- Events: Mile run 3000 metres
- College team: UCLA Bruins
- Coached by: Eirik Førde

Achievements and titles
- National finals: 2010 Norwegian U20s; • 2000m s'chase, 1st (gold); 2010 Norwegian U18s; • 2000m s'chase, 1st (gold); 2011 Norwegian U20s; • 2000m s'chase, 1st (gold); 2011 Norwegian Champs; • 1500m, 3rd (bronze); 2013 Norwegian Champs; • 5000m, 5th; 2016 NCAA Indoors; • Distance medley, 7th; 2017 Norwegian Champs; • 800m, 5th; • 1500m, 2nd (silver); 2018 Norwegian Champs; • 1500m, 2nd (silver); 2019 Norwegian Champs; • 1500m, 2nd (silver); 2020 Norwegian Champs; • 5000m, 6th; 2021 Norwegian Champs; • 1500m, 2nd (silver); 2022 Norwegian Champs; • 1500m, 2nd (silver)
- Personal bests: Mile: 3:53.42 (2021); 3000m: 7:36.32 (2023)
Medal record
Men's athletics
Representing Norway
European Team Champs First Division
First place	2021 Cluj-Napoca	1500 m
European Cross Country Championships
Bronze medal – third place	2009 Dublin	U20 team
Nordic Championships
Bronze medal – third place	2023 Copenhagen	1500 m
- Updated on 15 December 2023

Ferdinand Kvan Edman (born 12 February 1993) is a Norwegian middle-distance runner specializing in the 1500 metres. He is a five-time Norwegian Athletics Championships runner-up, four of those times losing only to Jakob Ingebrigtsen.

== Biography ==
Edman first gained international experience at the 2009 European Cross Country Championships in Dublin, where he finished 82nd in the U20 race with a time of 20:47 as part of the bronze medal-winning Norwegian team. The following year, he achieved a 27th-place finish in the U20 race at the 2010 European Cross Country Championships in Albufeira with a time of 18:50, and in 2011, he was eliminated in the first round of the 2011 European Athletics U20 Championships in Tallinn in the 1500 metres with a time of 3:53.13. In December, he placed 28th in the U20 race at the 2011 European Cross Country Championships in Velenje with a time of 18:36.

The following year, Edman competed at the 2010 World U20 Championships in Athletics in Barcelona, though he did not advance past the preliminary round in the 1500 metres with a time of 3:50.95. At the 2012 European Cross Country Championships in Szentendre, he finished fourth in the U20 race with a time of 18:59. That same year, he moved to the United States and competed on the UCLA Bruins track and field team.

At the 2017 European Cross Country Championships in Šamorín, he finished 52nd in the individual race with a time of 31:43. At the 2018 European Athletics Championships in Berlin, he was eliminated in the first round of the 1500 meters with a time of 3:50.26. In 2019, he did not qualify for the final at the 2019 European Athletics Indoor Championships in Glasgow with a time of 3:51.43, and in 2021, he won the 1500 meters at the 2021 Kuortane Games with a time of 3:38.36. In 2022, he was eliminated in the 1500 m preliminary rounds of the 2022 World Athletics Championships in Eugene with a time of 3:39.92, and subsequently finished eighth at the 2022 European Athletics Championships in München with a time of 3:37.27. The following year, he did not qualify for the final at the 2023 European Athletics Indoor Championships in Istanbul with a time of 3:44.44.

Edman became a full-time professional in 2022 and he is coached by Eirik Førde.

== Statistics ==
=== Personal bests ===
Event	Mark	Place	Competition	Venue	Date
Mile run	3:53.42	8th	Bislett Games	Oslo, Norway	1 July 2021
3000 metres	7:36.32	5th	Hanžeković Memorial	Zagreb, Croatia	10 September 2023
