= Botne Church =

Church in Vestfold, Norway

- Botne kirke
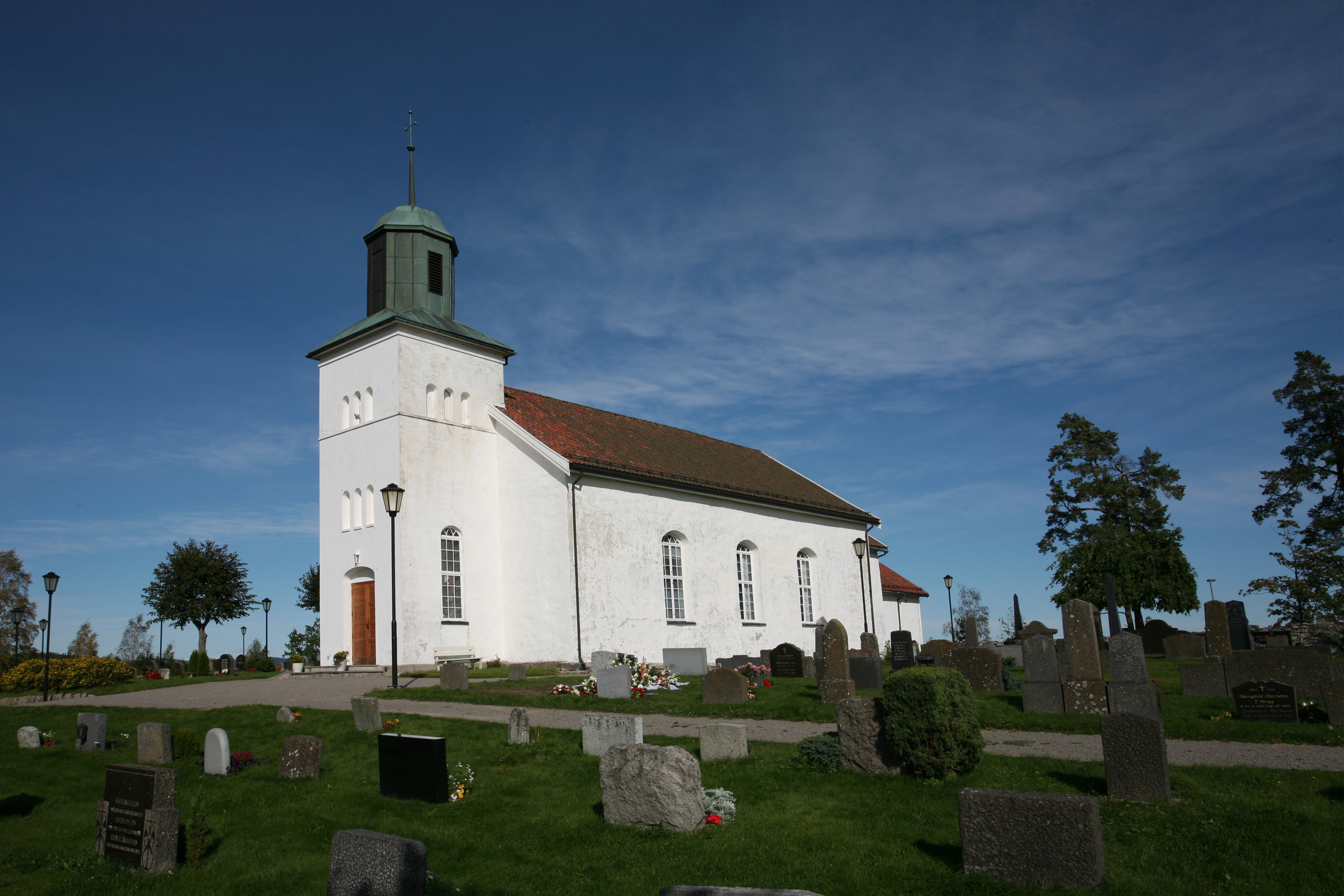
- View of the church
- Botne Church
- 59°28′52″N 10°16′38″E
- Location: Holmestrand, Vestfold
- Country: Norway
- Denomination: Church of Norway
- Previous denomination: Catholic Church
- Churchmanship: Evangelical Lutheran

History
- Status: Parish church
- Founded: c. 1200
- Consecrated: c. 1200

Architecture
- Functional status: Active
- Architectural type: Long church
- Completed: c. 1200 (826 years ago)

Specifications
- Capacity: 240
- Materials: Stone

Administration
- Diocese: Tunsberg
- Deanery: Nord-Jarlsberg prosti
- Parish: Botne
- Norwegian Cultural Heritage Site
- Type: Church
- Status: Automatically protected
- ID: 83935

Botne Church (Norwegian: Botne kirke) is a parish church of the Church of Norway in Holmestrand Municipality in Vestfold county, Norway. It is located in the village of Botne. It is one of the churches for the Botne parish which is part of the Nord-Jarlsberg prosti (deanery) in the Diocese of Tunsberg. The white, stone church was built in a long church design around the year 1200 using plans drawn up by an unknown architect. The church seats about 240 people.

== History ==
The earliest existing historical records of the church date back to the year 1398, but the church was not built that year. The stone church was likely built around the year 1200. This stone church originally only consisted of a nave and chancel, probably with a few small windows only on the south side. In 1699 a new church porch was built, and repairs were also made in 1713. In 1865, a major rebuilding of the church was carried out. The nave was extended to the east across its entire width by approximately 4 metres (13 ft), and the choir was extended into the sacristy. The nave's north wall was given a larger second floor seating gallery, and a new gallery was set up on the west wall. The roof was lowered, and a flat ceiling was added (which was removed in 1947). The stone floor was replaced with a wooden plank floor, and the walls were given a new layer of lime plaster. The church previously had 200 seats, and this was expanded to 230 in the nave and 70 in the galleries, for a total of 300 seats (today, the church limits it to 240 seats). A square tower with a church porch and bell tower was also built to replace a smaller tower on the nave roof. Towards the end of the 19th century, the 15th-century frescoes painted on the north wall were covered over with lime plaster. The baptismal font and the pulpit were painted over. The church was restored in 1941–47 (somewhat delayed due to World War II), when, among other things, the frescoes were uncovered once again and the second floor seating gallery on the north wall.

== Media gallery ==
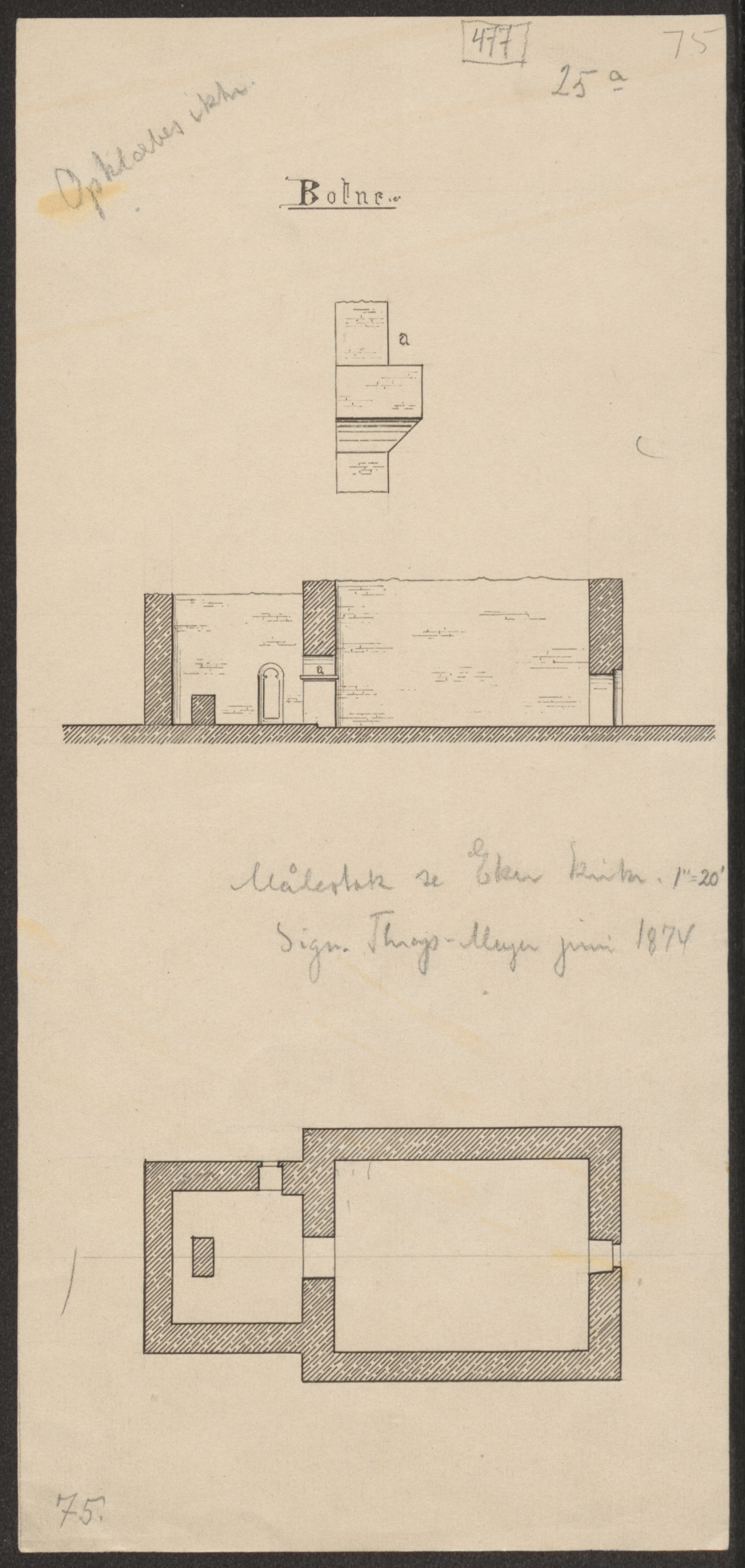

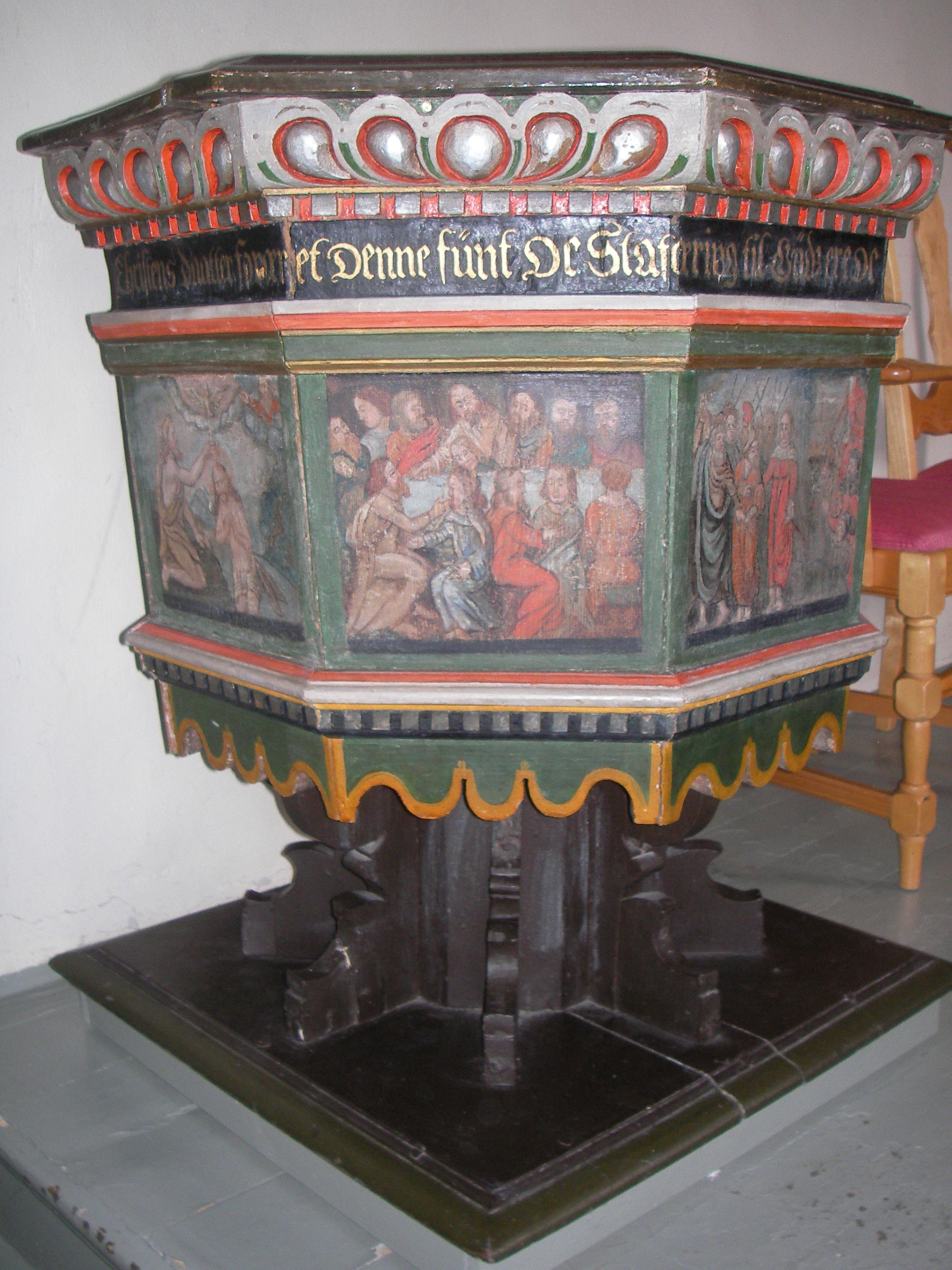

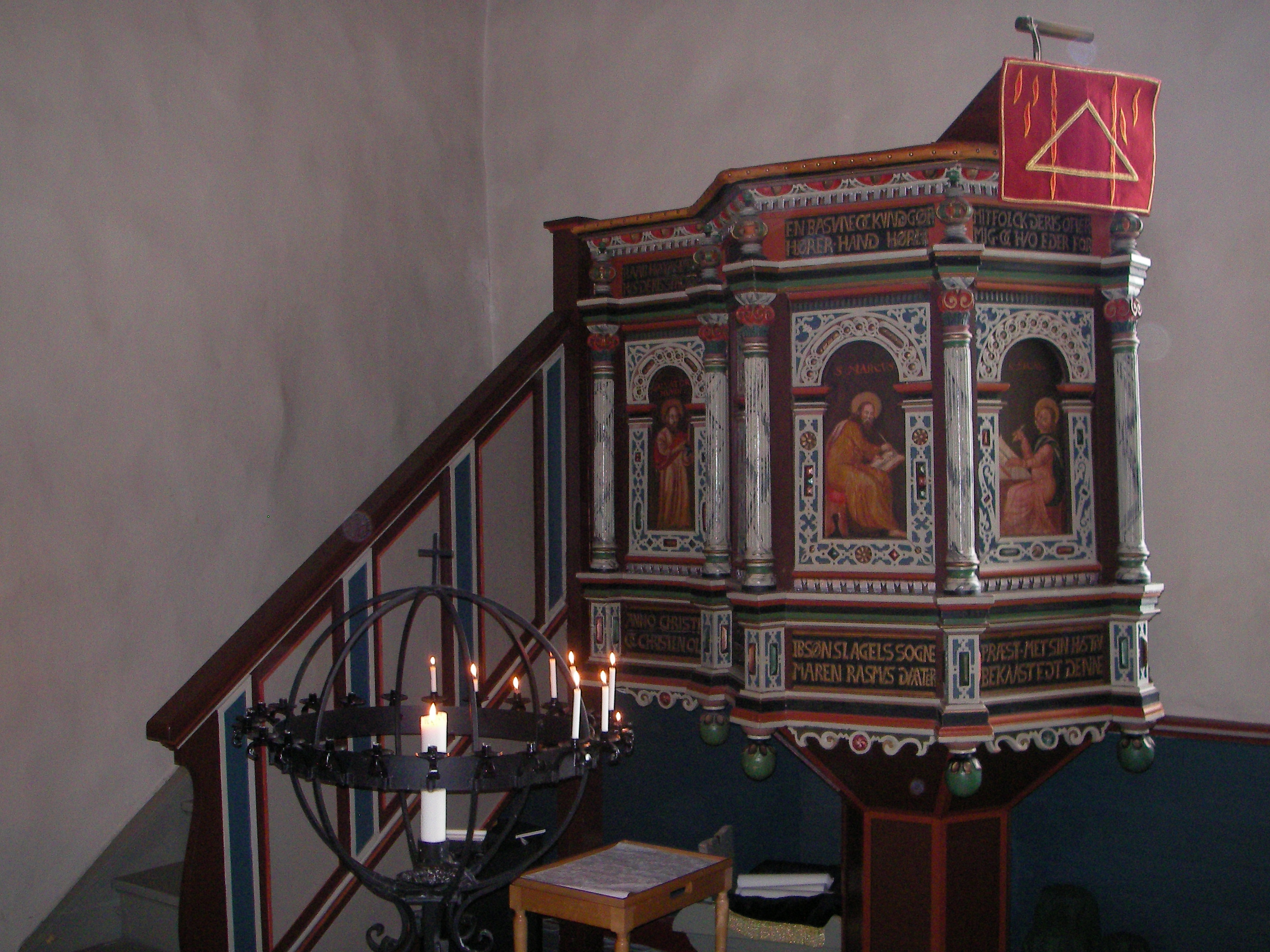

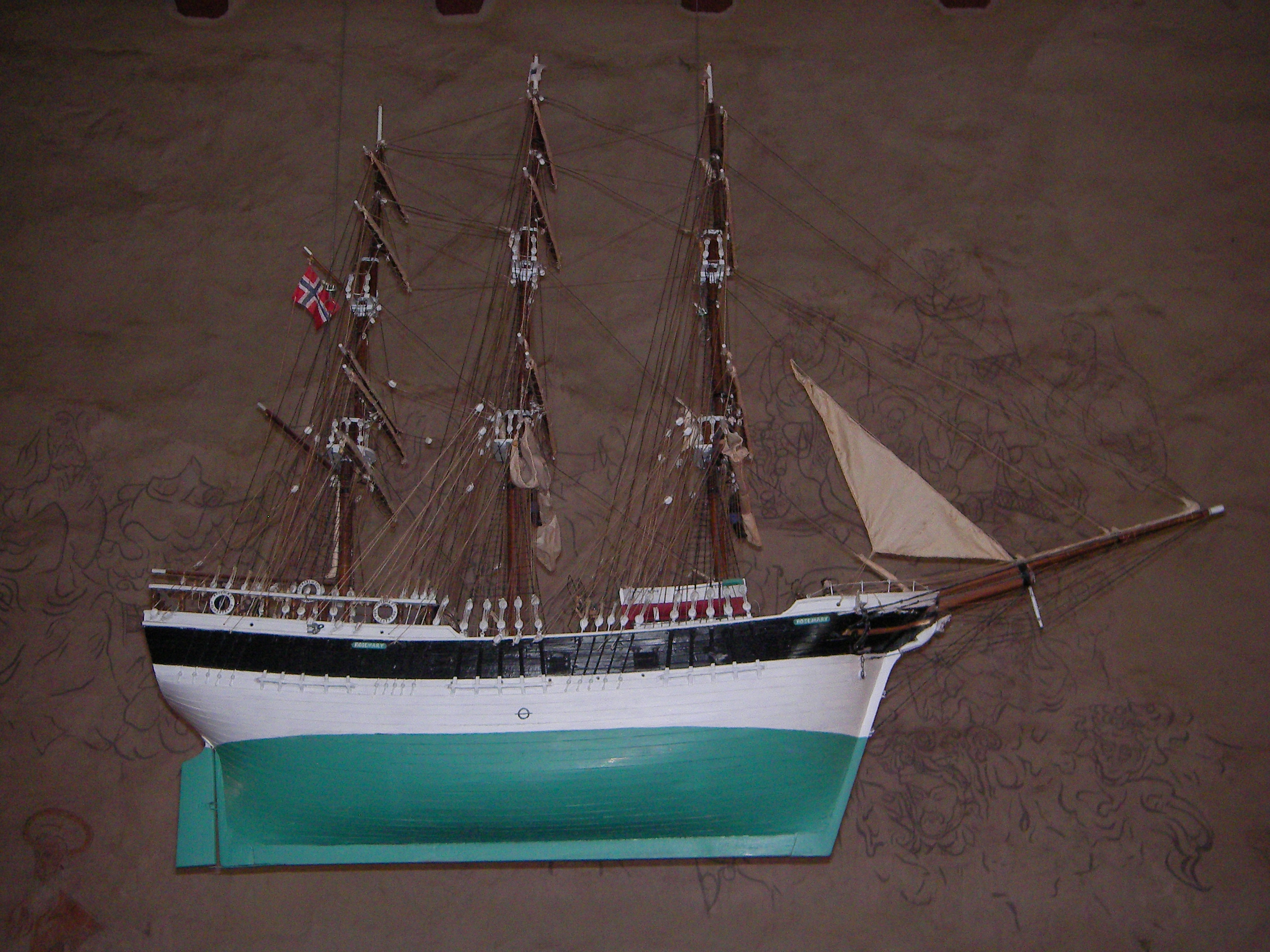

== See also ==
- List of churches in Tunsberg
