= Sande, Vestfold =

Village in Holmestrand Municipality, Norway

Sande Sande i Vestfold
- Village
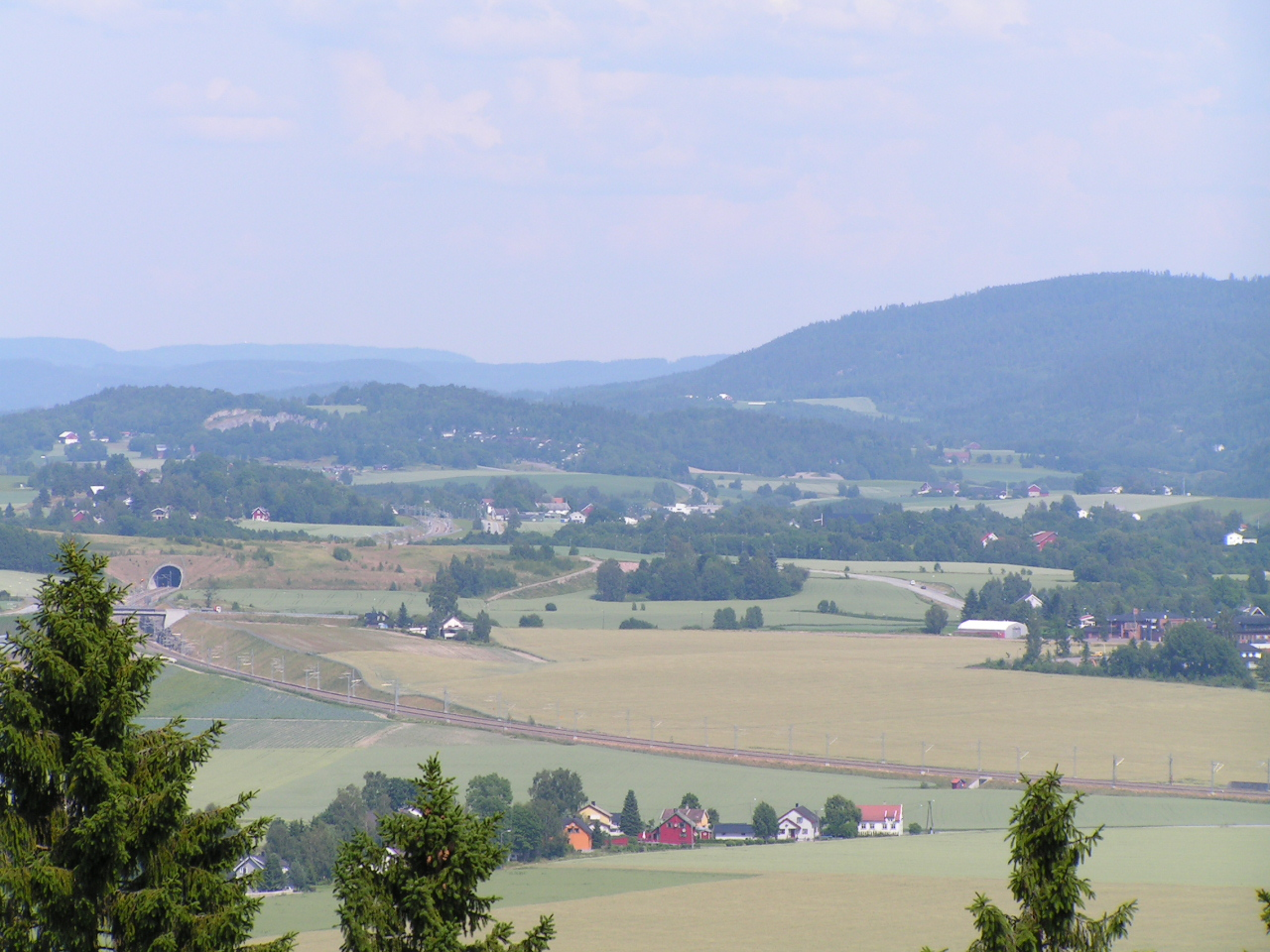
- View of the village
- Interactive map of Sande
- Coordinates: 59.58679°N 10.20808°E
- Country: Norway
- Region: Eastern Norway
- County: Vestfold
- District: Jarlsberg
- Municipality: Holmestrand Municipality

Area
  - Total: 1.37 km^{2} (0.53 sq mi)
- Elevation: 16 m (52 ft)

Population (2026)
  - Total: 2,364
  - Density: 1,726/km^{2} (4,470/sq mi)
- Time zone: UTC+01:00 (CET)
  - Summer (DST): UTC+02:00 (CEST)
- Post Code: 3070 Sande i Vestfold

Sande or Sande i Vestfold is a village in Holmestrand Municipality in Vestfold county, Norway. The village is located along the Sandebukta bay off the Ytre Oslofjord about 60 kilometres (37 mi) south of Oslo (about 50 minutes driving time). There are several nearby villages around Sande including the villages of Klevjer and Eikeberg about 7 kilometres (4.3 mi) to the north, the village of Selvik about 4 kilometres (2.5 mi) to the southeast, the town of Holmestrand about 10 kilometres (6.2 mi) to the south, and the village of Hof about 10 kilometres (6.2 mi) to the west. The European route E18 highway and the Vestfoldbanen railway line both past through the village of Sande.

The 1.37-square-kilometre (340-acre) village has a population (2026) of 2,364 and a population density of 1,726 inhabitants per square kilometre (4,470/sq mi). In recent years the village of Sande has grown significantly due to many new apartments and stores.

The newspaper Sande Avis is published in Sande. Portions of the 1973 Olsenbanden movie Olsenbanden tar gull from were filmed in Sande. Another portion was filmed in Stavern.

== History ==
Finds from the Stone Age indicate that the settlement in the area is up to 6,000–7,000 years old. The village was formerly called Angr (meaning "fjord"), but was later named after the rectory farm called "Sandvin". About 400 ancient artefacts and Burial mounds have been found in several places around Sande. The rock carvings on Sjøl are the only known carving field from the Bronze Age between Bærum and Sandefjord.

The village was the administrative centre of the old Sande Municipality which existed from 1838 until 2020 when the municipality became part of Holmestrand Municipality.

=== Name ===
The municipality (originally the parish) is named after the old Sande farm (Old Norse: Sandvin) since the first Sande Church was built there. The first element comes from the word sandr which means "sand". The last element comes from the word vin which means "meadow" or "pasture".

== Sande Church ==
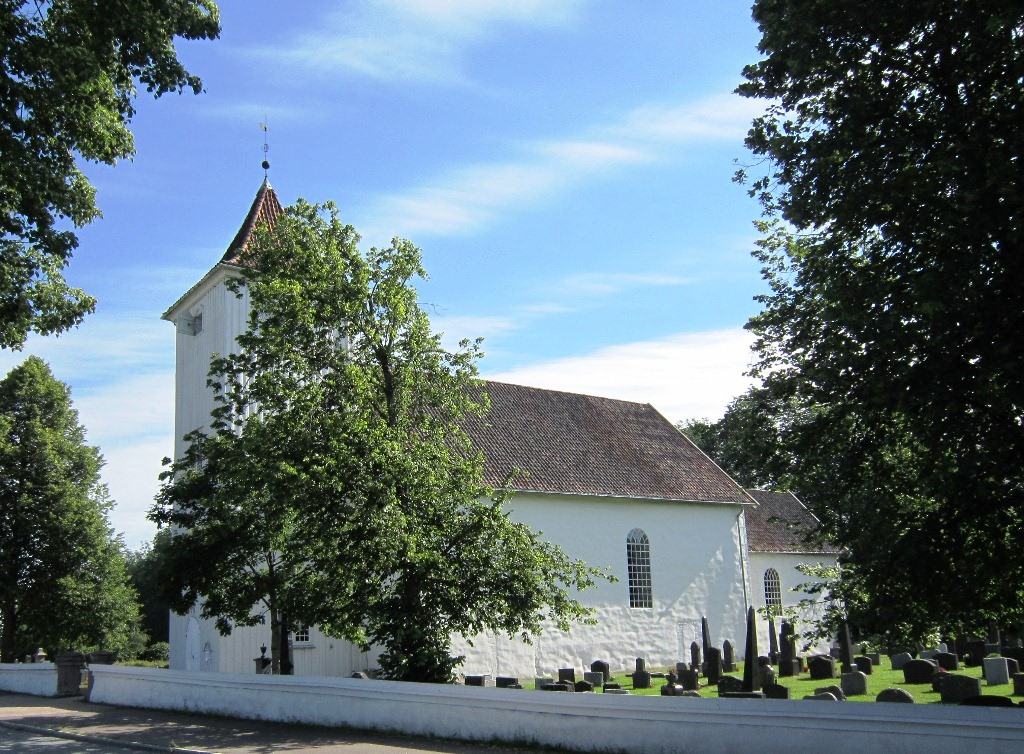
Sande Church in Vestfold

The medieval era Sande Church is located in the village of Sande. The parish is part of the Nord-Jarlsberg prosti. The building material is stone and brick, and it was built in 1150. In 1783, the church burned down; only the walls remained. Over the next eight years, it was rebuilt, and 1860 the church was refurnished. But the older altarpiece, baptismal font, and pulpit were retained. The pulpit is also from 1783 and features Rococo-style carvings. The font of soapstone is the only medieval inventory preserved.

== Climate ==
Climate data for Sande – Galleberg 1991–2020 (60 m, average high/low 1996-2025)
Month	Jan	Feb	Mar	Apr	May	Jun	Jul	Aug	Sep	Oct	Nov	Dec	Year
Mean daily maximum °C (°F)	0.1 (32.2)	1.3 (34.3)	5.6 (42.1)	11.3 (52.3)	16.9 (62.4)	20.9 (69.6)	22.9 (73.2)	21.6 (70.9)	17.1 (62.8)	10.6 (51.1)	5.3 (41.5)	1.2 (34.2)	11.2 (52.2)
Daily mean °C (°F)	−2.6 (27.3)	−2.2 (28.0)	0.8 (33.4)	5.5 (41.9)	10.9 (51.6)	14.6 (58.3)	17.1 (62.8)	16.0 (60.8)	11.6 (52.9)	6.1 (43.0)	2.0 (35.6)	−1.8 (28.8)	6.5 (43.7)
Mean daily minimum °C (°F)	−5.9 (21.4)	−5.4 (22.3)	−3.1 (26.4)	1.1 (34.0)	5.8 (42.4)	9.8 (49.6)	11.8 (53.2)	11 (52)	7.8 (46.0)	3.4 (38.1)	−0.4 (31.3)	−4.6 (23.7)	2.6 (36.7)
Average precipitation mm (inches)	67 (2.6)	45 (1.8)	45 (1.8)	53 (2.1)	73 (2.9)	87 (3.4)	82 (3.2)	102 (4.0)	91 (3.6)	103 (4.1)	104 (4.1)	76 (3.0)	928 (36.5)
Source 1: yr.no (mean, precipitation)
Source 2: seklima (average high/low)

== See also ==
- Sande Paper Mill
