= Ingar Bratseth-Kiplesund =

Norwegian long jumper (born 1996)

Ingar Kiplesund
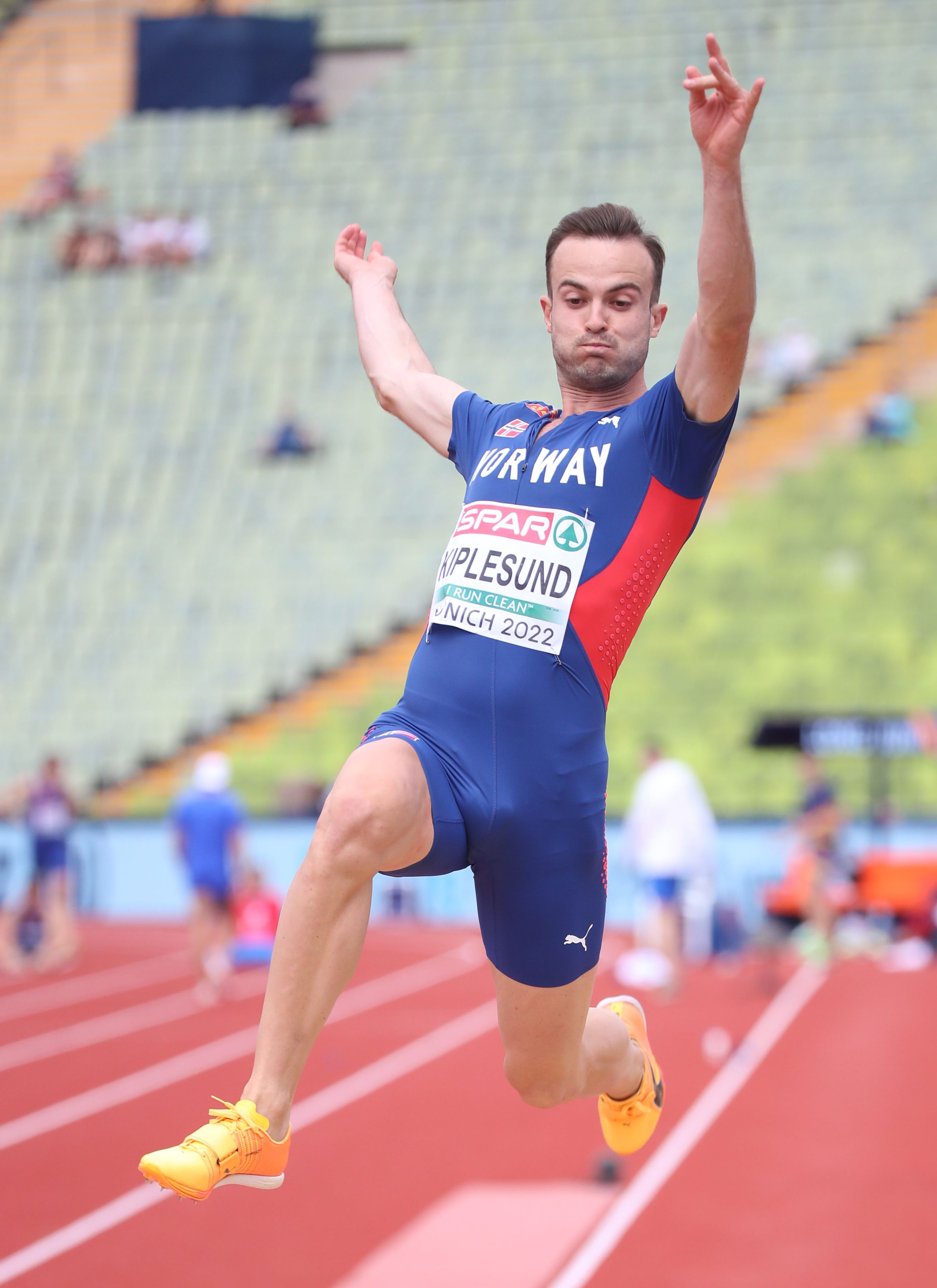
- Kiplesund at the 2022 European Athletics Championships – Men's long jump

Personal information
- Full name: Ingar Bratseth-Kiplesund
- Nationality: Norway
- Born: 15 November 1996 (age 29)
- Home town: Trondheim, Norway
- Height: 180 cm (5 ft 11 in)
- Weight: 73 kg (161 lb)
- Relative: Rune Bratseth (father in law)

Sport
- Sport: Athletics
- Events: Long jump Triple jump
- College team: Tennessee Volunteers
- Club: Trondheim Friidrett
- Coached by: Frank Brissach

Achievements and titles
- National finals: 2015 Norwegian Indoors; • Long jump, 2nd (silver); 2015 Norwegian Champs; • Long jump, 6th; 2015 Norwegian U20s; • Long jump, 2nd (silver); 2015 Norwegian U20s; • Long jump, 2nd (silver); 2016 Norwegian Ind. U23s; • Triple jump, 1st (gold); • Long jump, 1st (gold); 2016 Norwegian Indoors; • Long jump, 2nd (silver); 2016 Norwegian Champs; • Long jump, 1st (gold); • Triple jump, 4th; 2016 Norwegian U23s; • Long jump, 2nd (silver); 2017 Norwegian Indoors; • Long jump, 1st (gold); 2018 Norwegian Champs; • Long jump, 5th; • Triple jump, 1st (gold); 2019 Norwegian Indoors; • Long jump, 3rd (bronze); 2019 Norwegian Champs; • Long jump, 1st (gold); • Triple jump, 2nd (silver); 2020 Norwegian Indoors; • Long jump, 1st (gold); 2020 Norwegian Champs; • Triple jump, 2nd (silver); • Long jump, 2nd (silver); 2021 Norwegian Champs; • Long jump, 1st (gold); • Triple jump, 1st (gold); 2022 Norwegian Indoors; • Long jump, 2nd (silver); 2022 Norwegian Champs; • Long jump, 2nd (silver); 2023 Norwegian Champs; • Long jump, 1st (gold); • Triple jump, 1st (gold)
- Personal bests
- Updated on 1 January 2024

Ingar Bratseth-Kiplesund (born 15 November 1996) is a Norwegian long jumper and triple jumper. He broke the Norwegian national record in the long jump in 2019 and improved it further to 8.21 metres in 2023.

== Personal life ==
Kiplesund comes from an athletics family, as his mother Hildegunn had two uncles, Sigurd and Lars Magne Haugland, who were top Sunnhordland athletes in the 1960s, with Lars having an 11.2 100 metres personal best on a gravel track. His second cousin is Synne Eikeland, a top Norwegian 400 m hurdler. Around 2020, Kiplesund married the daughter of top Norwegian footballer Rune Bratseth and changed his name to Ingar Bratseth-Kiplesund.

== Career ==
In 2016, Kiplesund broke Nils Uhlin Hansen's Norwegian circuit record of 7.54 m dating back to 1939, with a 7.63 m jump.

Kiplesund won the 2017 Copenhagen Athletics Meeting, a European Athletics Classic Permit Meeting, with a 7.62 m leap. At the 2017 European Athletics Team Championships, Kiplesund placed 3rd in the First League long jump, contributing to a 6th-place team finish that saw Norway maintain its First League standing. His mark of 7.74 m made some consider him a medal contender for the 2017 European U23 Championships. At the U23 Championships, Kiplesund qualified for the finals and finished 5th. Kiplesund finished his 2017 championship season at the 2017 World University Games, where he qualified for the finals but finished last (12th) after only registering one of his first three jumps.

In early 2018, Kiplesund moved to the United States and competed briefly on the Tennessee Volunteers men's track and field team, with only one year of results recorded. He won his first senior triple jump national title at the 2018 Norwegian Athletics Championships, with a mark of 14.83 m representing Trondheim Friidrett. It was a personal best in his first triple jump competition in two years, and was touted as "revenge" after losing the long jump earlier in the competition.

On 6 July 2019, Kiplesund won the Triveneto European Athletics Area Permit Meeting with a 7.72 metres leap. Kiplesnd placed 7th in the finals of the 2019 World University Games, and after winning the 2019 Norwegian Athletics Championships long jump title he placed 3rd again in the First League 2019 European Athletics Team Championships.

On 17 August 2019, Kiplesund broke the long-standing Norwegian long jump record at a meeting in Sierra Nevada. His top three jumps were 8.10 m, 8.08 m, and 8.04 m – all three above the previous record of 8.02 m set by Kristen Fløgstad in 1973. The long jump record was the third oldest Norwegian record at the time of breaking.

Kiplesund won the long jump at the 2020 Norwegian Indoor Athletics Championships, and won silver medals in both horizontal jumps at the 2020 Norwegian Athletics Championships. Due to the COVID-19 pandemic, his international season was cut short.

Kiplesund competed at his first senior European Championships at the 2022 edition. At the championships, Kiplesund barely qualified for the finals as the last mark in, and then in the finals he did not register a legal jump.

At the 2023 Botswana Golden Grand Prix, Kipselund improved his personal best and national record to 8.21 metres. Due to a technical issue with the TV broadcast, the jump was not recorded but was still considered valid. Kiplesund competed at his first World Championships in 2023, where he did not advance to the finals and placed 31st overall with a 7.47 m jump. On his last jump, he completely missed the plank.

== Statistics ==
=== Personal bests ===
Event	Mark	Place	Competition	Venue	Date	Ref
Long jump	8.21 m =NR (-0.8 m/s)	2nd place, silver medalist(s)	Botswana Golden Grand Prix	Gaborone, Botswana	29 April 2023	
Triple jump	15.65 m (+0.9 m/s)	2nd place, silver medalist(s)	Norwegian Athletics Championships	Bergen, Norway	19 September 2020	
