= Klevjer =

Village in Holmestrand Municipality, Norway

Klevjer Klever (unofficial)
- Village
- Interactive map of Klevjer
- Coordinates: 59.65056°N 10.20487°E
- Country: Norway
- Region: Eastern Norway
- County: Vestfold
- District: Jarlsberg
- Municipality: Holmestrand Municipality

Area
  - Total: 0.33 km^{2} (0.13 sq mi)
- Elevation: 99 m (325 ft)

Population (2026)
  - Total: 493
  - Density: 1,494/km^{2} (3,870/sq mi)
- Time zone: UTC+01:00 (CET)
  - Summer (DST): UTC+02:00 (CEST)
- Post Code: 3074 Sande i Vestfold

Klevjer (sometimes known as Klever) is a village in Holmestrand Municipality in Vestfold county, Norway. The village is located about 7 kilometres (4.3 mi) to the north of the village of Sande i Vestfold and about 4 kilometres (2.5 mi) south of the village of Skoger (in Drammen Municipality). The European route E18 highway and the Vestfoldbanen railway line both run along the east side of Klevjer. The village of Eikeberg lies about 2 kilometres (1.2 mi) east of Klevjer on the opposite side of the highway.

The 0.33-square-kilometre (82-acre) village has a population (2026) of 493 and a population density of 1,494 inhabitants per square kilometre (3,870/sq mi).

Klevjer is mainly a residential area surrounded by farmland (to the north, east, and south) and forests (to the west). The local sports club is Nordre Sande IL.
