= IL Sandvin =

Norwegian athletics club

Idrettslaget Sandvin is a Norwegian athletics club from Selvik, Vestfold which was founded in 1964.

The club evolved into a national mainstay in the 2000s, especially for women. Camilla Dragseth Berg took the club's first national championship medal in 2002 with a silver in 100 metres hurdles. Øyunn Grindem Mogstad became the winningest athlete, but never won a national gold. In the high jump she won silvers in 2004 and 2008, and bronzes in 2005, 2007 and 2009. She was the club's most successful international athlete. She finished fourth at the 2005 European Junior Championships, and also competed at the 2006 World Junior Championships, the 2011 European Indoor Championships and the 2012 European Championships. Grindem also took two silver medals in the standing high jump.

Sandvin's first and only national champion was Charlotte Lund Abrahamsen, who won the shot put in 2006 and 2007. She also won a javelin throw bronze in 2006. Silje Disserud followed up with shot put bronzes in 2011 and 2012. Furthermore, Kristin Holte took a pole vault bronze in 2005 and silver in 2007.
