= Gloppen FIL =

Norwegian sports club

Gloppen Friidrettslag
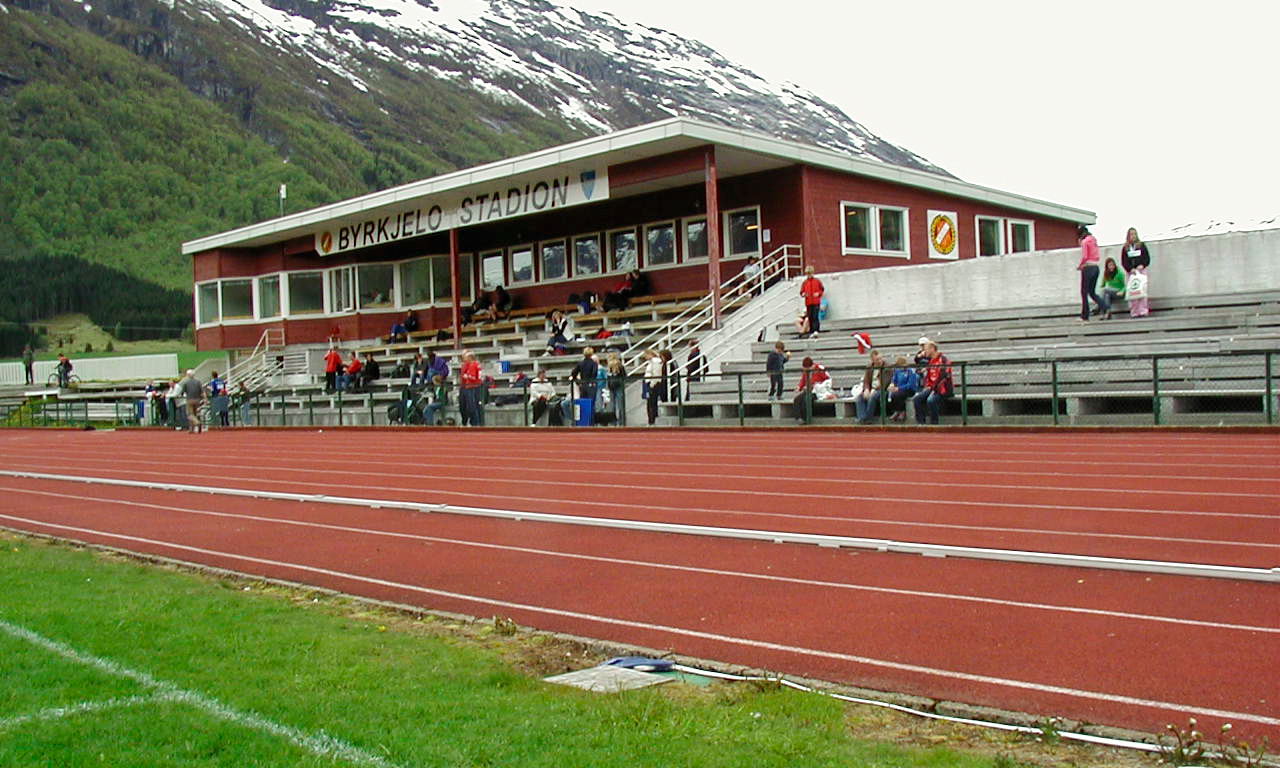
- Full name: Gloppen Friidrettslag
- Founded: 1990
- Ground: Byrkjelo stadion Byrkjelo, Gloppen Municipality

Gloppen Friidrettslag (also GFIL, English: Gloppen athletics club) is a sports club in Gloppen Municipality, Norway. It was founded in 1990.

The club is a superstructure club for the five existing track and field athletics in the municipality (Brodd, Breimsbygda, Fjellhug/Vereide, Hyen, Sandane). Byrkjelo stadion is the club's home track, where the Norwegian Championships were last held in 2011.

GFIL is among the leading track and field clubs in Norway. Well known athletes are the throwers and national champions Kjell Ove Hauge (shot put and discus), Arne Indrebø (javelin), Elin Isane (discus and shot put) and Trude Raad (hammer throw). Odd Bjørn Hjelmeset also has a medal from the National championships in 3000 meter steeplechase for the club.
