= Otto Bonden =

Norwegian farmer and politician

Otto Bonden (3 September 1858 – 28 July 1924) was a Norwegian farmer, businessperson and politician for the Liberal Left Party.

He was born in Sande, Vestfold as a son of farmers Ole Bonden (1816–1889) and Grethe Karine née Christiansen (1825–1869). When his father died in 1889, Bonden took over the family farm Øvre Bonden, where he died in July 1924. Bonden was also a shopowner near Sande Station and invested in forestry and mining, being a board member of Dalen Gruver.

He served as a member of Sande municipal council from 1902 to 1910, including a period as mayor from 1907 to 1910, and later returned to the municipal council from 1923 to his death.

Bonden was elected as a deputy representative to the Parliament of Norway from the single-member constituency Jarlsberg in 1915 and 1918 as the running mate of Jørgen Hansen Gunnestad. They were joint tickets of the Conservative and the Liberal Left parties. In 1915 they needed a run-off election to win, whereas in 1918 they carried their constituency in the first round. Bonden met in parliamentary session in March 1920. He served as deputy mayor of Sande when he died in July 1924.
