= Eikeberg =

Village in Holmestrand Municipality, Norway

Eikeberg Ekeberg
- Village
- Interactive map of Eikeberg
- Coordinates: 59.63823°N 10.23814°E
- Country: Norway
- Region: Eastern Norway
- County: Vestfold
- District: Jarlsberg
- Municipality: Holmestrand Municipality

Area
  - Total: 0.32 km^{2} (0.12 sq mi)
- Elevation: 59 m (194 ft)

Population (2026)
  - Total: 480
  - Density: 1,500/km^{2} (3,900/sq mi)
- Time zone: UTC+01:00 (CET)
  - Summer (DST): UTC+02:00 (CEST)
- Post Code: 3074 Sande i Vestfold

Eikeberg or Ekeberg is a village in Holmestrand Municipality in Vestfold county, Norway. The village is located about 6 kilometres (3.7 mi) to the north of the village of Sande i Vestfold and about 5 kilometres (3.1 mi) to the south of the village of Skoger (in Drammen Municipality). The European route E18 highway and the Vestfoldbanen railway line both pass by just to the west of the village. The village of Klever is located on the other side of the E18 highway to the northwest of Eikeberg.

The 0.32-square-kilometre (79-acre) village has a population (2026) of 480 and a population density of 1,500 inhabitants per square kilometre (3,900/sq mi).

This village is where the writer Ragnhild Jølsen was born. The author Jens Bjørneboe's wrote the book "Dream and the wheel" about the life of Ragnhild Jølsen, and wrote about Eikeberg in this book.
