= Selvik =

Village in Holmestrand Municipality, Norway

- Village
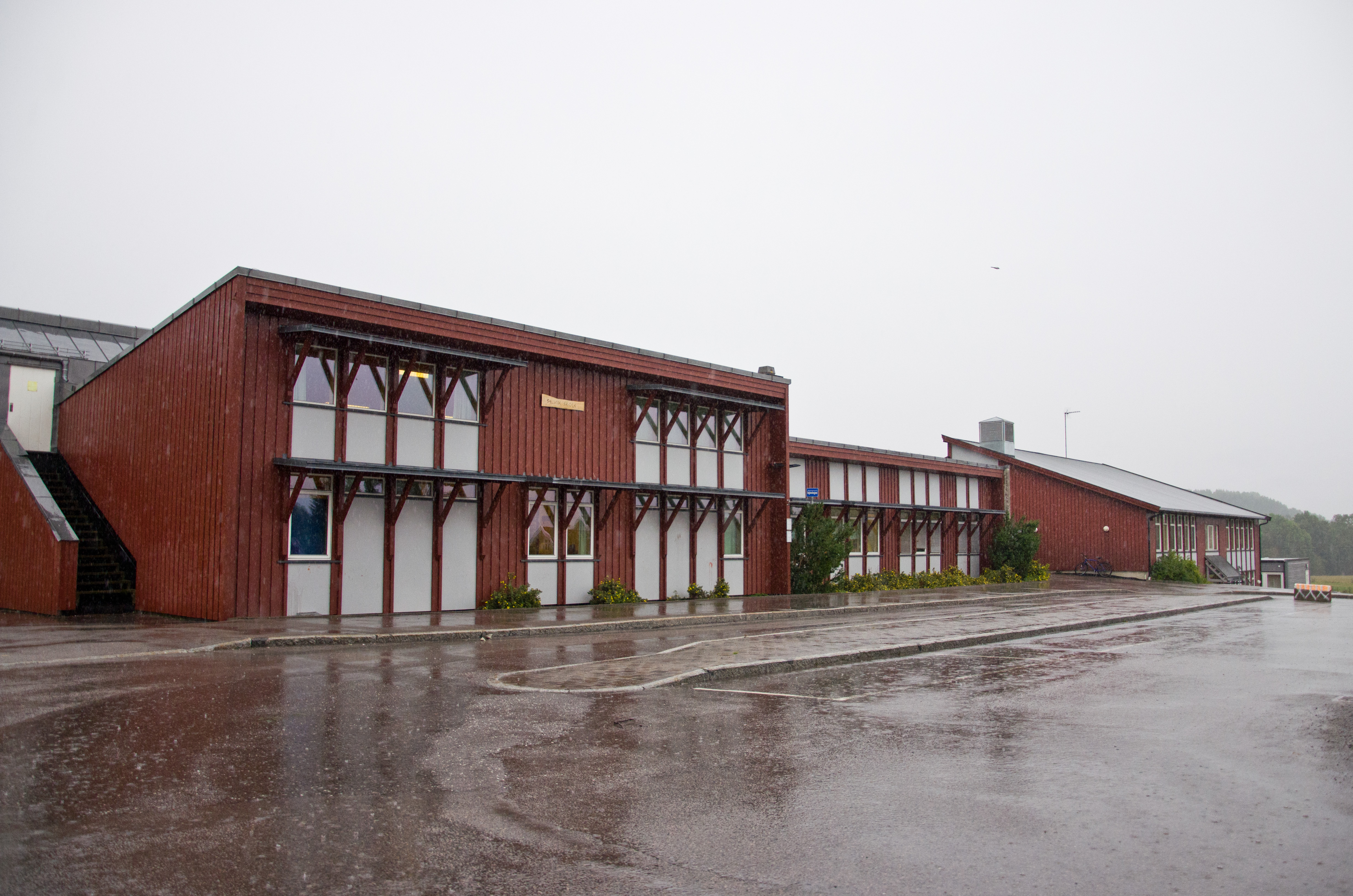
- View of the village school
- Interactive map of Selvik
- Coordinates: 59.56645°N 10.26006°E
- Country: Norway
- Region: Eastern Norway
- County: Vestfold
- District: Jarlsberg
- Municipality: Holmestrand Municipality

Area
  - Total: 1.65 km^{2} (0.64 sq mi)
- Elevation: 8 m (26 ft)

Population (2026)
  - Total: 3,576
  - Density: 2,167/km^{2} (5,610/sq mi)
- Time zone: UTC+01:00 (CET)
  - Summer (DST): UTC+02:00 (CEST)
- Post Code: 3077 Sande i Vestfold

Selvik is a village in Holmestrand Municipality in Vestfold county, Norway. The village is located on the shore of the Sandebukta bay, about 3.5 kilometres (2.2 mi) southeast of the village of Sande i Vestfold and about 10 kilometres (6.2 mi) to the north of the town of Holmestrand. The village of Berger (in Drammen Municipality) lies about 9 kilometres (5.6 mi) to the southeast, at the mouth of the Drammensfjorden.

The 1.65-square-kilometre (410-acre) village has a population (2026) of 3,576 and a population density of 2,167 inhabitants per square kilometre (5,610/sq mi).

The sports club IL Sandvin is based in Selvik.
