= Sande Church (Vestfold) =

Church in Vestfold, Norway

- Sande kirke
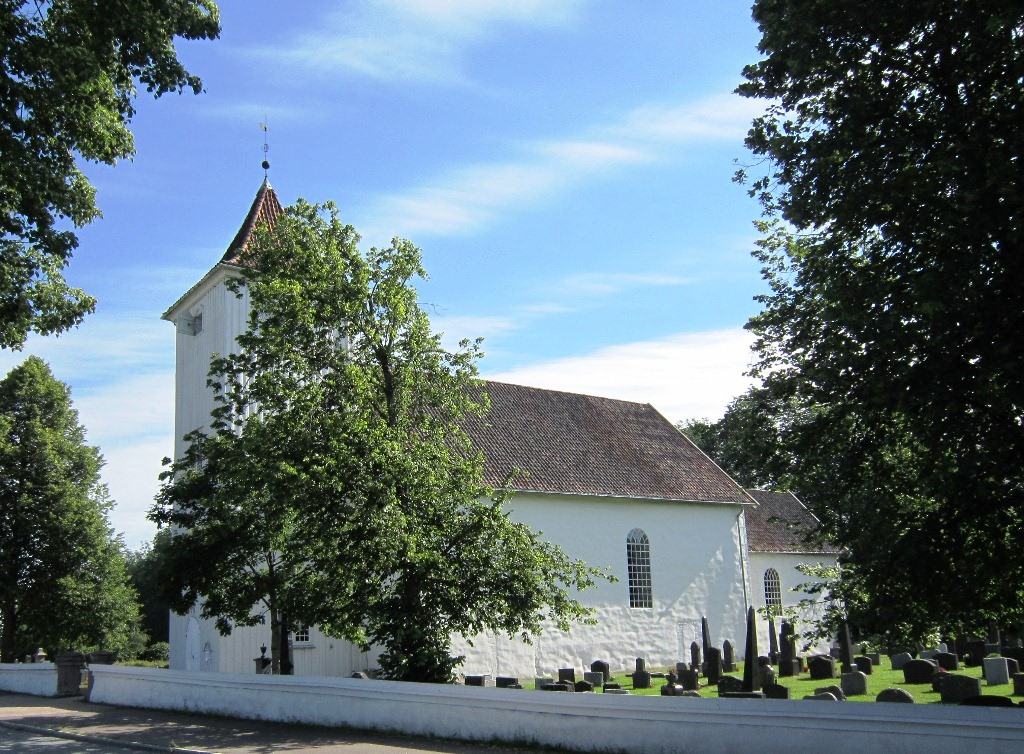
- View of the church
- Sande Church
- 59°35′20″N 10°12′30″E
- Location: Holmestrand Municipality, Vestfold
- Country: Norway
- Denomination: Church of Norway
- Previous denomination: Catholic Church
- Churchmanship: Evangelical Lutheran

History
- Status: Parish church
- Founded: c. 1150
- Consecrated: c. 1150

Architecture
- Functional status: Active
- Architectural type: Long church
- Style: Romanesque
- Completed: c. 1150 (876 years ago)

Specifications
- Capacity: 350
- Materials: Stone

Administration
- Diocese: Tunsberg
- Deanery: Nord-Jarlsberg prosti
- Parish: Sande
- Norwegian Cultural Heritage Site
- Type: Church
- Status: Automatically protected
- ID: 85377

Sande Church (Norwegian: Sande kirke) is a parish church of the Church of Norway in Holmestrand Municipality in Vestfold county, Norway. It is located in the village of Sande i Vestfold. It is the church for the Sande parish which is part of the Nord-Jarlsberg prosti (deanery) in the Diocese of Tunsberg. The white, stone church was built in a long church design around the year 1150 using plans drawn up by an unknown architect. The church seats about 350 people.

== History ==
The earliest existing historical records of the church date back to the year 1387, but the church was not built that year. The church is usually dated to between 1050 and 1150, or more precisely it is said to be built near the end of Olav Kyrre's time (1066–1093). The Romanesque stone church originally consisted of a rectangular nave and a smaller, rectangular chancel. In 1631, a new wooden bell tower was built on top of the nave roof. In 1665, the whole church was renovated. On 5 April 1783, a fire broke out in the rectory, which was right next to the church. As the rectory burned, the fire spread to the church and the whole church burned. After the fire, all that was left were the exterior stone walls, the baptismal font, some church silver from the altar, the altarpiece's two paintings, and a priest's chasuble. Over the next several years, the rubble was cleared and the church was rebuilt, re-using the old stone walls. As part of the rebuilding effort, a new wooden bell tower and church porch was constructed on the west end of the nave. A new wooden sacristy on the north side of the chancel was also constructed. Prior to the fire, the church only had 2 windows on the east end of the chancel, but during the rebuilding, 3 new windows were put in the south wall of the church.

In 1814, this church served as an election church (Norwegian: valgkirke). Together with more than 300 other parish churches across Norway, it was a polling station for elections to the 1814 Norwegian Constituent Assembly which wrote the Constitution of Norway. This was Norway's first national elections. Each church parish was a constituency that elected people called "electors" who later met together in each county to elect the representatives for the assembly that was to meet at Eidsvoll Manor later that year.

== Media gallery ==
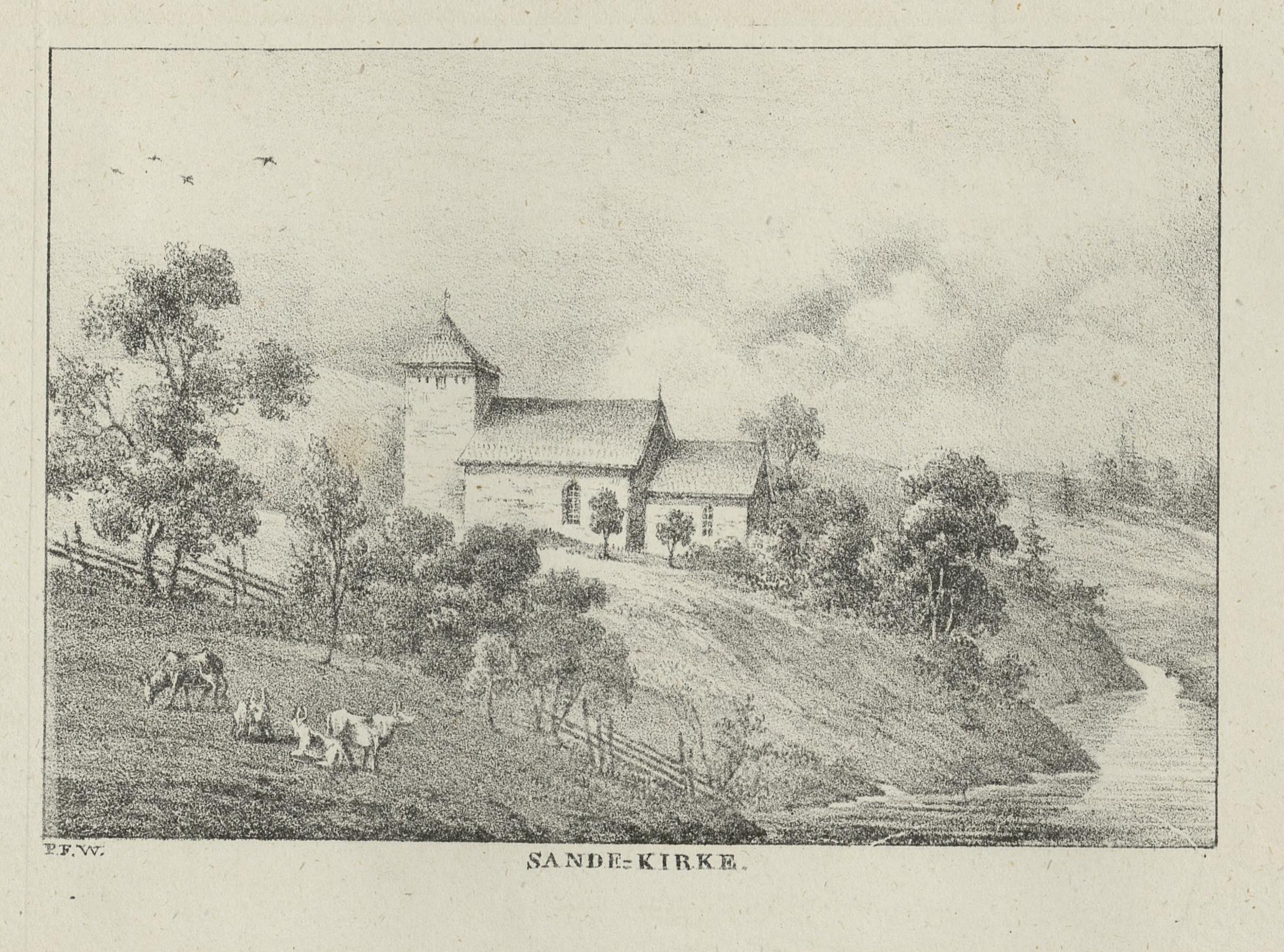

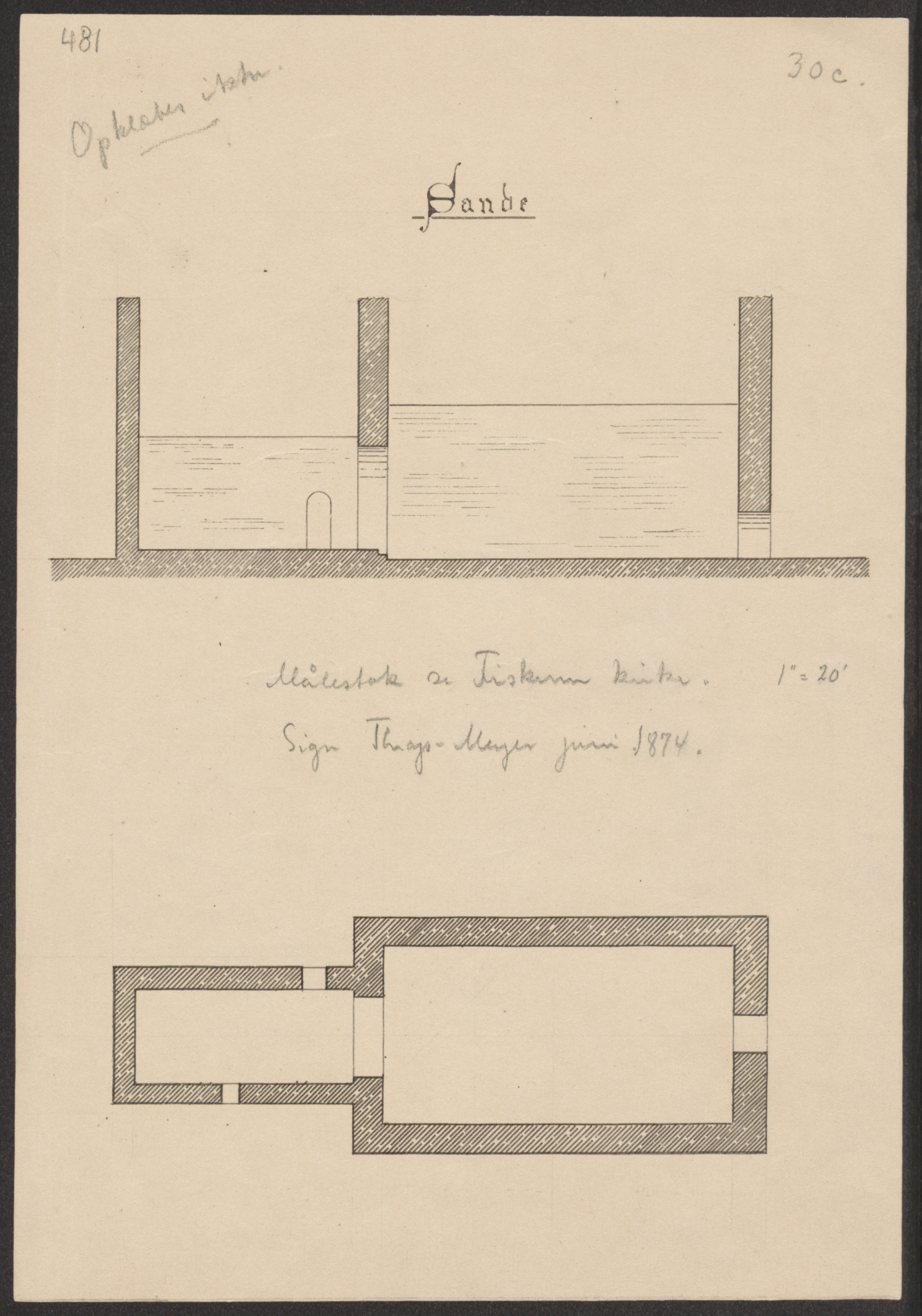

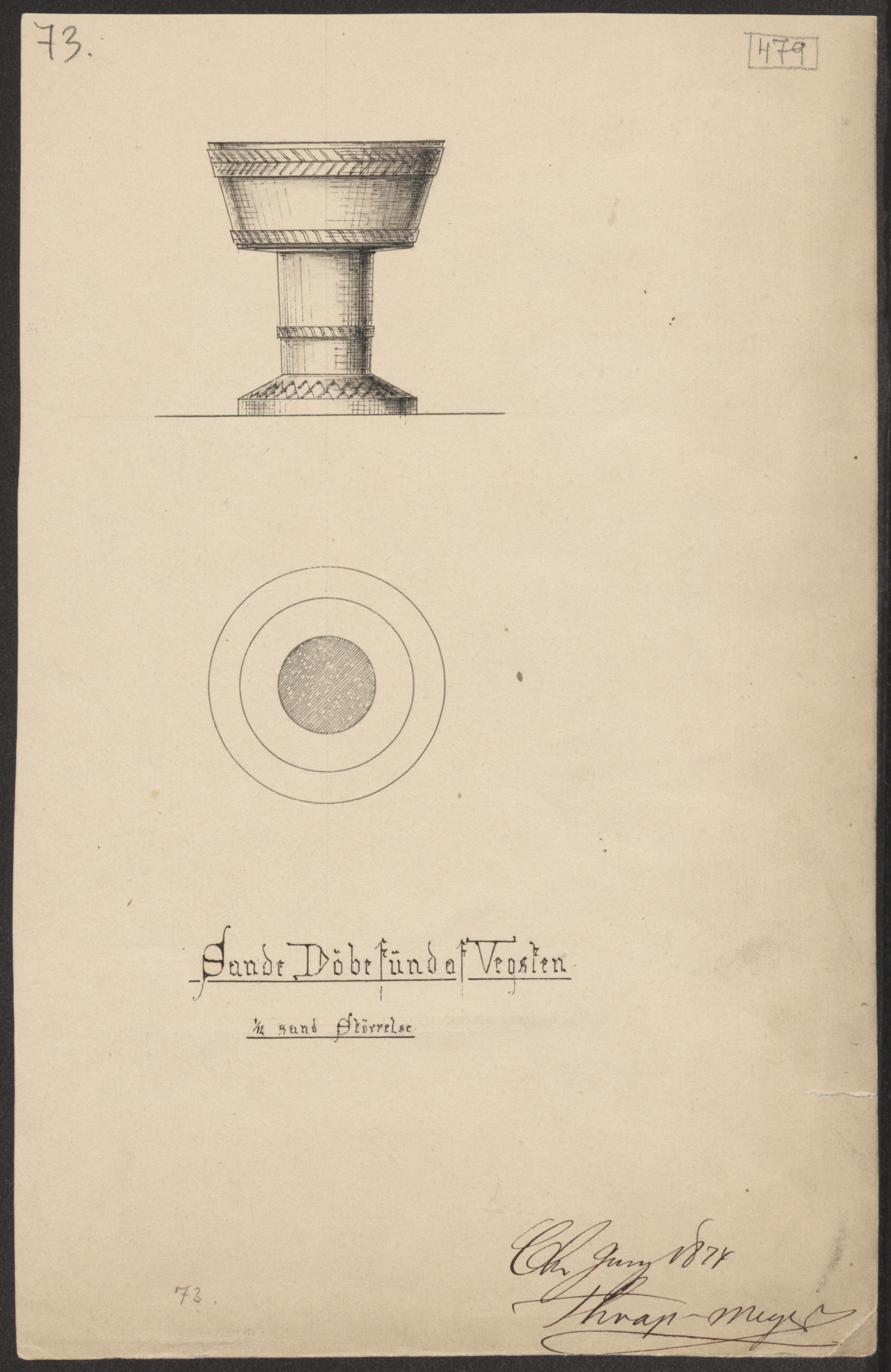

== See also ==
- List of churches in Tunsberg
