= Trude Raad =

Norwegian deaf track and field athlete

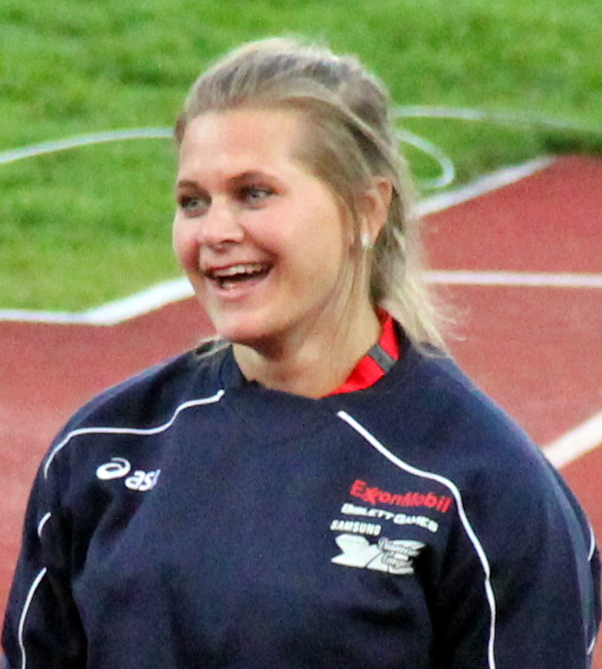

Personal information
- Nationality: Norway
- Born: April 27, 1990 (age 36) Breim, Norway

Sport
- Club: Gloppen FIL
Medal record
Women's Athletics
Representing Norway
Event / 1st / 2nd / 3rd; Deaflympics / 4 / 0 / 0
Deaflympics
Gold medal – first place	Taipei 2009	discus throw
Gold medal – first place	Taipei 2009	hammer throw
Gold medal – first place	Sofia 2013	hammer throw
Gold medal – first place	Samsun 2017	hammer throw

Trude Raad (born 27 April 1990) is a deaf Norwegian track and field athlete. She generally competes in the discus throw and hammer throw events at the International competitions. Trude has represented Norway at the Deaflympics in 2009, 2013 and 2017 and has won 4 gold medals in her Deaflympic career. She was also a champion in the women's hammer throw event at the Deaflympics on 3 consecutive occasions (2009, 2013, 2017). She broke her own deaf world record in the women's hammer throw at the 2017 Summer Deaflympics with a distance of 66.35m, the previous best was 65.03m

Trude Raad currently holds the Deaflympic records for the women's hammer throw and discus throw events. She was awarded the ICSD Deaf Sportswoman of the Year award in 2008 for her performances in deaf athletics including Junior deaf world records set by her in 2009 at the women's hammer throw and discus throw events. She was also nominated for the ICSD Deaf Sportswoman of the Year award in 2009.
