= Hønefoss Brug =

Norwegian wood pulp company

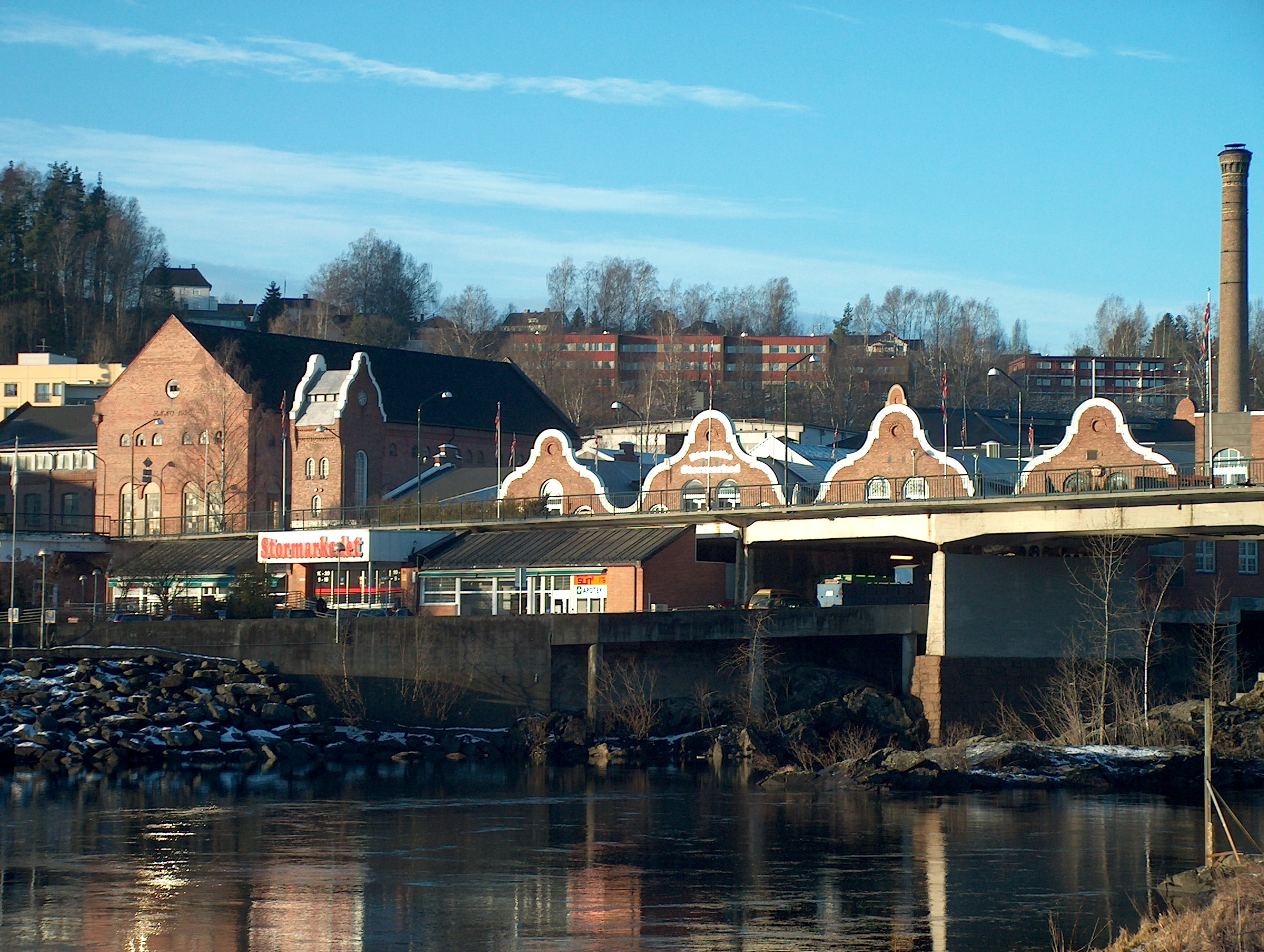
- Formerly: Hønefos Træsliberi
- Type: Industrial company
- Industry: Wood pulp
- Founded: 1879
- Defunct: 1935
- Headquarters: Hønefoss, Ringerike, Buskerud, Norway
- Products: Wood pulp

Hønefoss Brug was an industrial company in Hønefoss in Ringerike that produced wood pulp at the Hønefossen waterfall. The company was established in 1879 and closed in 1935. Hønefoss Brug consisted of a wood-grinding mill, sawmill, planing mill, and a box factory, as well as properties in Hønefoss, Norderhov, and Haugsbygda.

== History ==
With the new industry that emerged in the 1870s in Norway, Hønefoss saw a long-awaited revival as an industrial town. Before then the town had struggled for a long time without significant new establishments. The timber industry gradually concentrated around towns such as Drammen and Fredrikstad, and especially around the plank town at the mouth of the Glomma. Around 1814 there were 13 sawmills in operation at Hønefossen, but by the 1850s there were almost none left. The wood-processing industry, which was advancing in the 1870s, breathed new life into the declining business activity at Hønefossen.

=== Founder from Østfold and machines from Kristiania ===
In addition to the structures being favorable for industrial establishment in the Drammen watercourse, a good deal of individual effort also contributed to the wood-processing industry gaining a foothold in Hønefoss and other parts of the watercourse. In Hønefoss it was Christian August Anker who stood out as the leading figure. Anker was born at the Rød farm near Halden. Together with his brother Niels he ran the firm Peter Anker, which they had inherited from their father. Before Anker invested in a wood-grinding mill in Hønefoss, he had established Skånigsfoss Tresliperi near Halden (later Ankers Træsliperi & Papirfabrik).

Anker gradually became interested in the Hønefoss area. He started a process that led to all properties and sawmills at Hønefossen becoming part of his many holdings. After that process was over, he was able to establish a wood pulp factory there in 1879. It was Myrens Verksted that supplied the machinery, and the factory began operating in October 1881. In the first years 8,000 tonnes of wood pulp were produced on two grindstones, and this production required 70 employees. In 1887 the driving power was 840 horsepower.

=== Wood pulp for English newspapers ===
Anker owned the mill for 14 years. In 1893 he sold it to the British firm Edward Lloyd Ltd. for 810,000 kroner. Edward Lloyd's firm was a worldwide group with its head office in London and branch offices in South Africa, Canada, Australia, Argentina, and Japan. The main factory, which until the 1920s was the largest in the world, lay on the banks of the Thames. The paper was produced with esparto grass as fiber material, and to supply the paper factories with esparto, Edward Lloyd Ltd. owned large plantations in North Africa and southern Spain.

Esparto was gradually replaced with wood fiber in paper manufacturing. It was as a wood-fiber supplier to Lloyd's factories that Hønefoss Brug became an important piece. As Lloyd's got under way in Hønefoss, the wood-grinding mill was expanded with a hot-grinding apparatus in 1894, which was early compared with several of the companies in the surrounding area. The British group invested further in the company and carried out a number of modernizations and improvements to the facility through the 1900s. In 1906 wood pulp production was carried out with 21 grinding machines, and sorting took place in 13 refiners. The driving power was then expanded to 6,700 horsepower, exclusively waterpower.

=== The municipalities buy the waterfall rights ===
When Edward Lloyd Ltd. withdrew as owner of Hønefoss Brug in 1918, the mill had a production of 25,000 tonnes of wood pulp across 18 grinding machines. The firm sold the waterfall and the properties to Hønefoss and Norderhov municipalities for 3.2 million kroner. The municipality borrowed 5 million kroner for the project.

The part of this amount that did not go toward buying out Edward Lloyd Ltd. was to be used to build a power station and distribution network. Edward Lloyd Ltd., however, reserved the right to lease the wood-grinding mill for an annual production of up to 20,000 tonnes for the next 14 years, with the possibility of a further seven years' extension of the lease. The mill was kept in operation until the mid-1930s. From 1936 onward the waterpower was used for power production. The sawmill and planing mill continued, but the wood-grinding operation was never resumed.

== Bibliography ==
- Krohn, Ivar, et al. Hønefoss Byens Historie. Hønefoss kommune, 1915.
- Kveseth, Per, ed. (2001). Hønefossboka 2002. Hønefoss.
- Mikkelsen, Per (1975). Norsk tremasseindustri 1863–1895. En studie i et industrielt gjennombrudd, hovedfagsoppgave i historie. Oslo.
- Ropeid, Andreas (1965). Hønefoss, annet bind, handverk og industri 1800–1900. Utgitt av Ringerike kommune.
- Smith, Øyvind (1998). «Fålum» og distriktets treforedling – Treforedling fra 1872.
