= 2024 Bislett Games =

- Dates: 30 May 2024
- Host city: Oslo, Norway
- Venue: Bislett Stadium
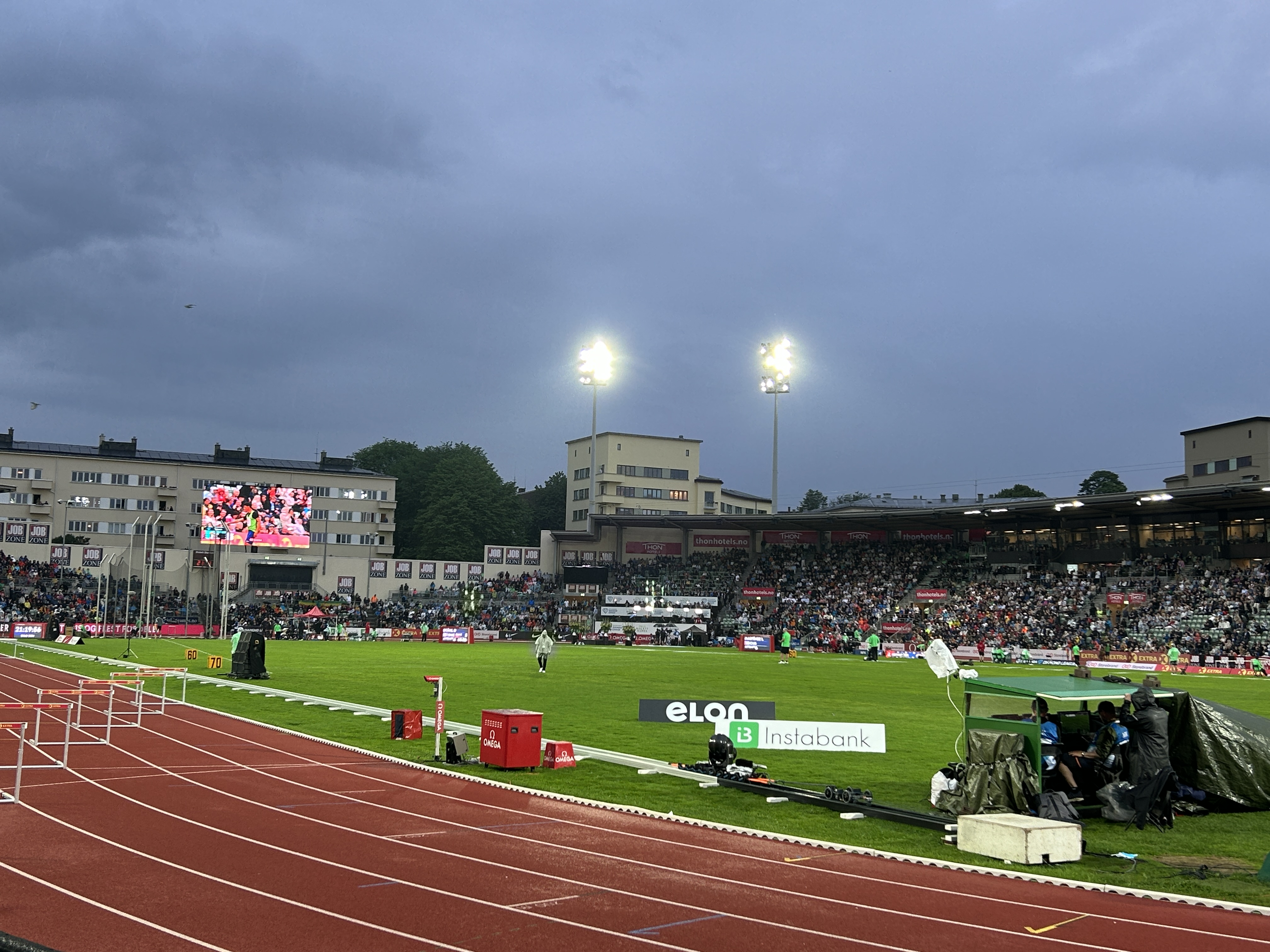
- Level: 2024 Diamond League

The 2024 Bislett Games was the 59th edition of the annual outdoor track and field meeting in Oslo, Norway. Held on 30 May at Bislett Stadium, it was the sixth leg of the 2024 Diamond League – the highest level international track and field circuit.

== Highlights ==
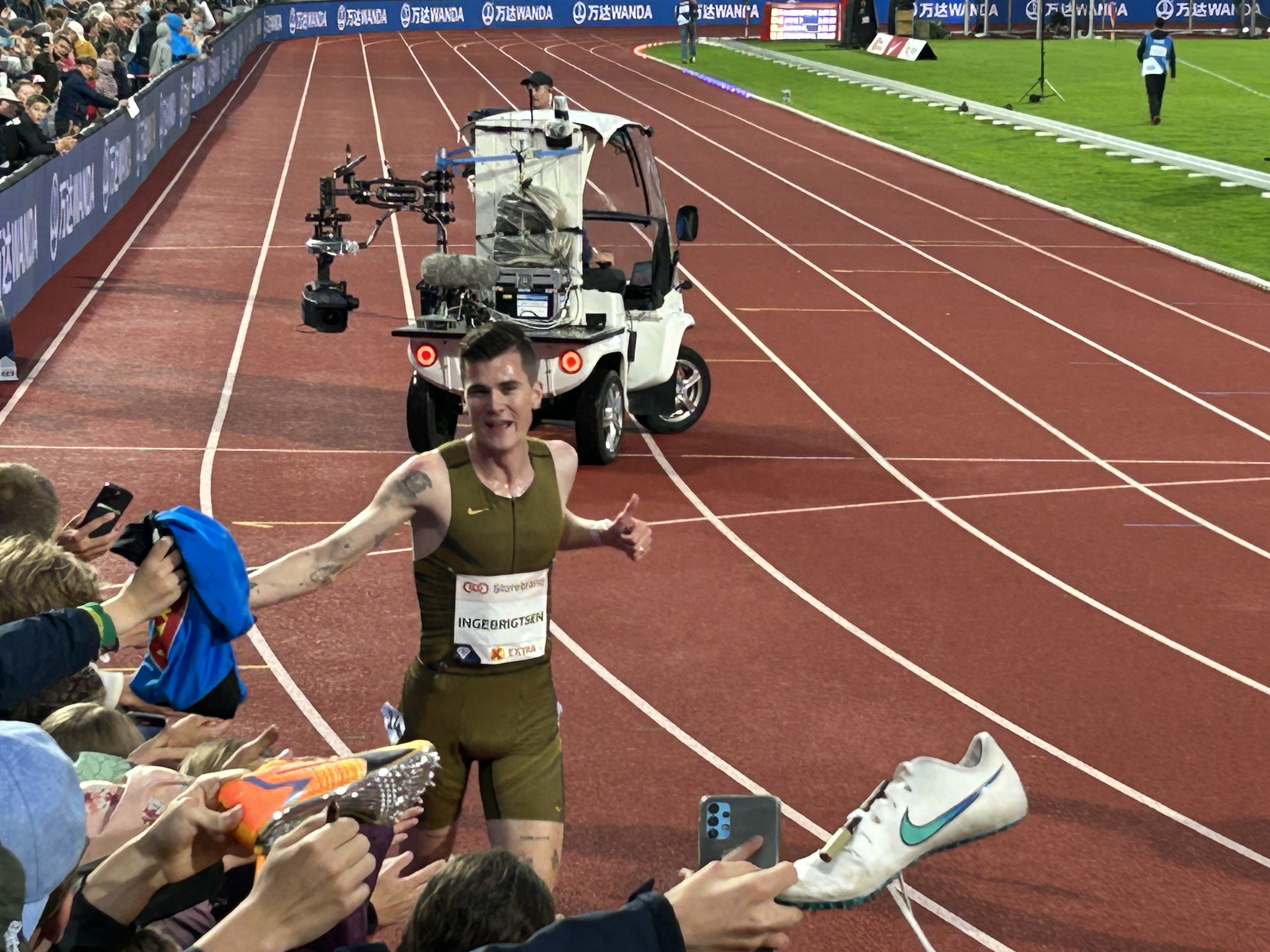
Jakob Ingebrigtsen under his victory round on Bislett Stadium

The meeting was highlighted by a 5000 metres world record attempt. It was won unexpectedly by Hagos Gebrhiwet of Ethiopia in a time of 12:36.73, less than two seconds behind the 2020 world record by Joshua Cheptegei who was also in the race.

== Results ==
Athletes competing in the Diamond League disciplines earned extra compensation and points which went towards qualifying for the 2024 Diamond League finals. First place earned 8 points, with each step down in place earning one less point than the previous, until no points are awarded in 9th place or lower. In the case of a tie, each tying athlete earns the full amount of points for the place.

=== Diamond Discipline ===
Men's 100 Metres (+0.4 m/s)
Place	Athlete	Age	Country	Time	Points
1st place, gold medalist(s)	Akani Simbine	30	South Africa	9.94	8
2nd place, silver medalist(s)	Abdul Hakim Sani Brown	25	Japan	9.99	7
3rd place, bronze medalist(s)	Emmanuel Eseme	30	Cameroon	10.01	6
4	Marcell Jacobs	29	Italy	10.03	5
5	Brandon Hicklin	25	United States	10.05	4
6	Rohan Watson	22	Jamaica	10.23	3
7	Yohan Blake	34	Jamaica	10.29	2
8	Jeremiah Azu	23	Great Britain	11.11	1

Men's 400 Metres
Place	Athlete	Age	Country	Time	Points
1st place, gold medalist(s)	Matthew Hudson-Smith	29	Great Britain	44.07	8
2nd place, silver medalist(s)	Kirani James	31	Grenada	44.58	7
3rd place, bronze medalist(s)	Vernon Norwood	32	United States	44.68	6
4	Leungo Scotch	28	Botswana	45.02	5
5	Quincy Hall	25	United States	45.02	4
6	Lythe Pillay	21	South Africa	45.34	3
7	Håvard Bentdal Ingvaldsen	21	Norway	45.41	2
8	Rusheen McDonald	31	Jamaica	47.60	1

Men's 1500 Metres
Place	Athlete	Age	Country	Time	Points
1st place, gold medalist(s)	Jakob Ingebrigtsen	23	Norway	3:29.74	8
2nd place, silver medalist(s)	Timothy Cheruiyot	28	Kenya	3:29.77	7
3rd place, bronze medalist(s)	Azeddine Habz	30	France	3:30.80	6
4	Isaac Nader	24	Portugal	3:30.84	5
5	Elliot Giles	30	Great Britain	3:31.06	4
6	Olli Hoare	27	Australia	3:31.08	3
7	George Mills	25	Great Britain	3:31.57	2
8	Pietro Arese	24	Italy	3:32.13	1
9	Robert Farken	26	Germany	3:32.20	
10	Andrew Coscoran	27	Ireland	3:32.68	
11	Adel Mechaal	33	Spain	3:33.21	
12	Ryan Mphahlele	25	South Africa	3:33.85	
13	Narve Gilje Nordås	25	Norway	3:34.86	
14	Stewart McSweyn	28	Australia	3:38.22	
	Boaz Kiprugut	26	Kenya	DNF	
	Žan Rudolf	31	Slovenia	DNF	

Men's 5000 Metres
Place	Athlete	Age	Country	Time	Points
1st place, gold medalist(s)	Hagos Gebrhiwet	30	Ethiopia	12:36.73	8
2nd place, silver medalist(s)	Yomif Kejelcha	26	Ethiopia	12:38.95	7
3rd place, bronze medalist(s)	Jacob Kiplimo	23	Uganda	12:40.96	6
4	Thierry Ndikumwenayo	27	Spain	12:48.10	5
5	Addisu Yihune	21	Ethiopia	12:49.65	4
6	Luis Grijalva	25	Guatemala	12:50.58	3
7	Dominic Lokinyomo Lobalu	25	Switzerland	12:50.90	2
8	Andreas Almgren	28	Sweden	12:50.94	1
9	Joshua Cheptegei	27	Uganda	12:51.94	
10	Oscar Chelimo	22	Uganda	12:54.59	
11	Jimmy Gressier	27	France	12:54.97	
12	Samuel Tefera	24	Ethiopia	12:55.78	
13	Adriaan Wildschutt	26	South Africa	12:56.67	
14	Telahun Haile Bekele	25	Ethiopia	13:08.80	
15	Stanley Mburu	24	Kenya	13:18.67	
16	Ferdinand Kvan Edman	31	Norway	13:23.66	
17	Per Svela	32	Norway	13:25.70	
18	Brian Fay	25	Ireland	13:30.45	
19	Awet Nftalem Kibrab	29	Norway	13:44.52	
	Callum Davies	24	Australia	DNF	
	Mike Foppen	27	Netherlands	DNF	
	Jude Thomas	22	Australia	DNF	

Men's 400 Metres Hurdles
Place	Athlete	Age	Country	Time	Points
1st place, gold medalist(s)	Alison dos Santos	23	Brazil	46.63	8
2nd place, silver medalist(s)	Karsten Warholm	28	Norway	46.70	7
3rd place, bronze medalist(s)	Kyron McMaster	27	British Virgin Islands	48.49	6
4	Rasmus Mägi	32	Estonia	48.56	5
5	Joshua Abuaku	27	Germany	49.37	4
6	CJ Allen	29	United States	49.42	3
7	Andreas Haara Bakketun	23	Norway	51.32	2
8	Bassem Hemeida	24	Qatar	51.41	1

Men's Pole Vault
Place	Athlete	Age	Country	Mark	Points
1st place, gold medalist(s)	KC Lightfoot	24	United States	5.82 m	8
2nd place, silver medalist(s)	Emmanouil Karalis	24	Greece	5.72 m	7
3rd place, bronze medalist(s)	EJ Obiena	28	Philippines	5.72 m	6
4	Sam Kendricks	31	United States	5.72 m	5
5	Bo Kanda Lita Baehre	25	Germany	5.72 m	4
6	Menno Vloon	30	Netherlands	5.72 m	3
7	Chris Nilsen	26	United States	5.62 m	2
8	Simen Guttormsen	23	Norway	5.52 m	1
9	Thibaut Collet	24	France	5.42 m	

Men's Triple Jump
Place	Athlete	Age	Country	Mark	Points
1st place, gold medalist(s)	Hugues Fabrice Zango	30	Burkina Faso	17.27 m (−0.1 m/s)	8
2nd place, silver medalist(s)	Yasser Triki	27	Algeria	17.25 m (+0.6 m/s)	7
3rd place, bronze medalist(s)	Lázaro Martínez	26	Cuba	16.85 m (+0.9 m/s)	6
4	Jean-Marc Pontvianne	29	France	16.59 m (±0.0 m/s)	5
5	Tiago Pereira	30	Portugal	16.51 m (−0.1 m/s)	4
6	Almir dos Santos	30	Brazil	16.41 m (+0.3 m/s)	3
7	Christian Taylor	33	United States	16.14 m (+0.1 m/s)	2
8	Gabriel Wallmark	22	Sweden	16.01 m (−1.3 m/s)	1

Men's Discus Throw
Place	Athlete	Age	Country	Mark	Points
1st place, gold medalist(s)	Mykolas Alekna	21	Lithuania	70.91 m	8
2nd place, silver medalist(s)	Matthew Denny	27	Australia	67.61 m	7
3rd place, bronze medalist(s)	Daniel Ståhl	31	Sweden	66.80 m	6
4	Lukas Weißhaidinger	32	Austria	65.68 m	5
5	Kristjan Čeh	25	Slovenia	65.12 m	4
6	Fedrick Dacres	30	Jamaica	65.06 m	3
7	Andrius Gudžius	33	Lithuania	63.65 m	2
8	Ola Stunes Isene	29	Norway	62.36 m	1
	Simon Pettersson	30	Sweden	NM	

Women's 200 Metres (−0.2 m/s)
Place	Athlete	Age	Country	Time	Points
1st place, gold medalist(s)	Brittany Brown	29	United States	22.32	8
2nd place, silver medalist(s)	Marie-Josée Ta Lou	35	Ivory Coast	22.36	7
3rd place, bronze medalist(s)	Daryll Neita	27	Great Britain	22.50	6
4	Anavia Battle	25	United States	22.84	5
5	Shericka Jackson	29	Jamaica	22.97	4
6	Jenna Prandini	31	United States	23.10	3
7	Maboundou Koné	27	Ivory Coast	23.13	2
8	Tasa Jiya	26	Netherlands	23.13	1

Women's 400 Metres
Place	Athlete	Age	Country	Time	Points
1st place, gold medalist(s)	Marileidy Paulino	27	Dominican Republic	49.30	8
2nd place, silver medalist(s)	Natalia Kaczmarek	26	Poland	49.80	7
3rd place, bronze medalist(s)	Alexis Holmes	24	United States	50.40	6
4	Lieke Klaver	25	Netherlands	50.62	5
5	Sada Williams	26	Barbados	50.71	4
6	Henriette Jæger	20	Norway	50.81	3
7	Laviai Nielsen	28	Great Britain	51.04	2
8	Victoria Ohuruogu	31	Great Britain	51.61	1

Women's 800 Metres
Place	Athlete	Age	Country	Time	Points
1st place, gold medalist(s)	Prudence Sekgodiso	22	South Africa	1:58.66	8
2nd place, silver medalist(s)	Natoya Goule	33	Jamaica	1:59.10	7
3rd place, bronze medalist(s)	Catriona Bisset	30	Australia	1:59.29	6
4	Elena Bellò	27	Italy	2:00.05	5
5	Anita Horvat	27	Slovenia	2:00.32	4
6	Eveliina Määttänen	28	Finland	2:00.89	3
7	Tsige Duguma	23	Ethiopia	2:01.31	2
8	Gabriela Gajanová	24	Slovakia	2:02.00	1
9	Noélie Yarigo	38	Benin	2:02.30	
	Agata Kołakowska	26	Poland	DNF	

Women's 3000 Metres
Place	Athlete	Age	Country	Time	Points
1st place, gold medalist(s)	Georgia Griffith	27	Australia	8:24.20	8
2nd place, silver medalist(s)	Likina Amebaw	26	Ethiopia	8:24.29	7
3rd place, bronze medalist(s)	Jessica Hull	27	Australia	8:25.82	6
4	Maureen Koster	31	Netherlands	8:26.30	5
5	Karoline Bjerkeli Grøvdal	33	Norway	8:27.02	4
6	Marta García	26	Spain	8:29.32	3
7	Caroline Nyaga	30	Kenya	8:30.99	2
8	Nathalie Blomqvist	23	Finland	8:32.23	1
9	Wubrist Aschal	19	Ethiopia	8:33.65	
10	Nozomi Tanaka	24	Japan	8:34.09	
11	Edinah Jebitok	22	Kenya	8:35.32	
12	Rose Davies	24	Australia	8:35.57	
13	Laura Galván	32	Mexico	8:36.13	
14	Lauren Ryan	26	Australia	8:42.63	
15	Jessica Warner-Judd	29	Great Britain	8:59.98	
	Sarah Billings	26	Australia	DNF	

Women's 400 Metres Hurdles
Place	Athlete	Age	Country	Time	Points
1st place, gold medalist(s)	Rushell Clayton	31	Jamaica	54.02	8
2nd place, silver medalist(s)	Andrenette Knight	27	Jamaica	54.63	7
3rd place, bronze medalist(s)	Janieve Russell	30	Jamaica	55.07	6
4	Amalie Iuel	30	Norway	55.50	5
5	Jessie Knight	29	Great Britain	55.52	4
6	Anna Ryzhykova	34	Ukraine	55.58	3
7	Ayomide Folorunso	27	Italy	56.06	2
8	Viivi Lehikoinen	24	Finland	56.23	1

Women's Discus Throw
Place	Athlete	Age	Country	Mark	Points
1st place, gold medalist(s)	Feng Bin	30	China	67.89 m	8
2nd place, silver medalist(s)	Sandra Perković Elkasević	33	Croatia	66.48 m	7
3rd place, bronze medalist(s)	Daisy Osakue	28	Italy	63.29 m	6
4	Jorinde van Klinken	24	Netherlands	63.16 m	5
5	Liliana Cá	37	Portugal	62.69 m	4
6	Claudine Vita	27	Germany	61.69 m	3
7	Mélina Robert-Michon	44	France	61.57 m	2
8	Shanice Craft	31	Germany	60.24 m	1

== See also ==
- 2024 Diamond League
