= 2016 Bislett Games =

- Dates: 9 June 2016
- Host city: Oslo, Norway
- Venue: Bislett Stadium
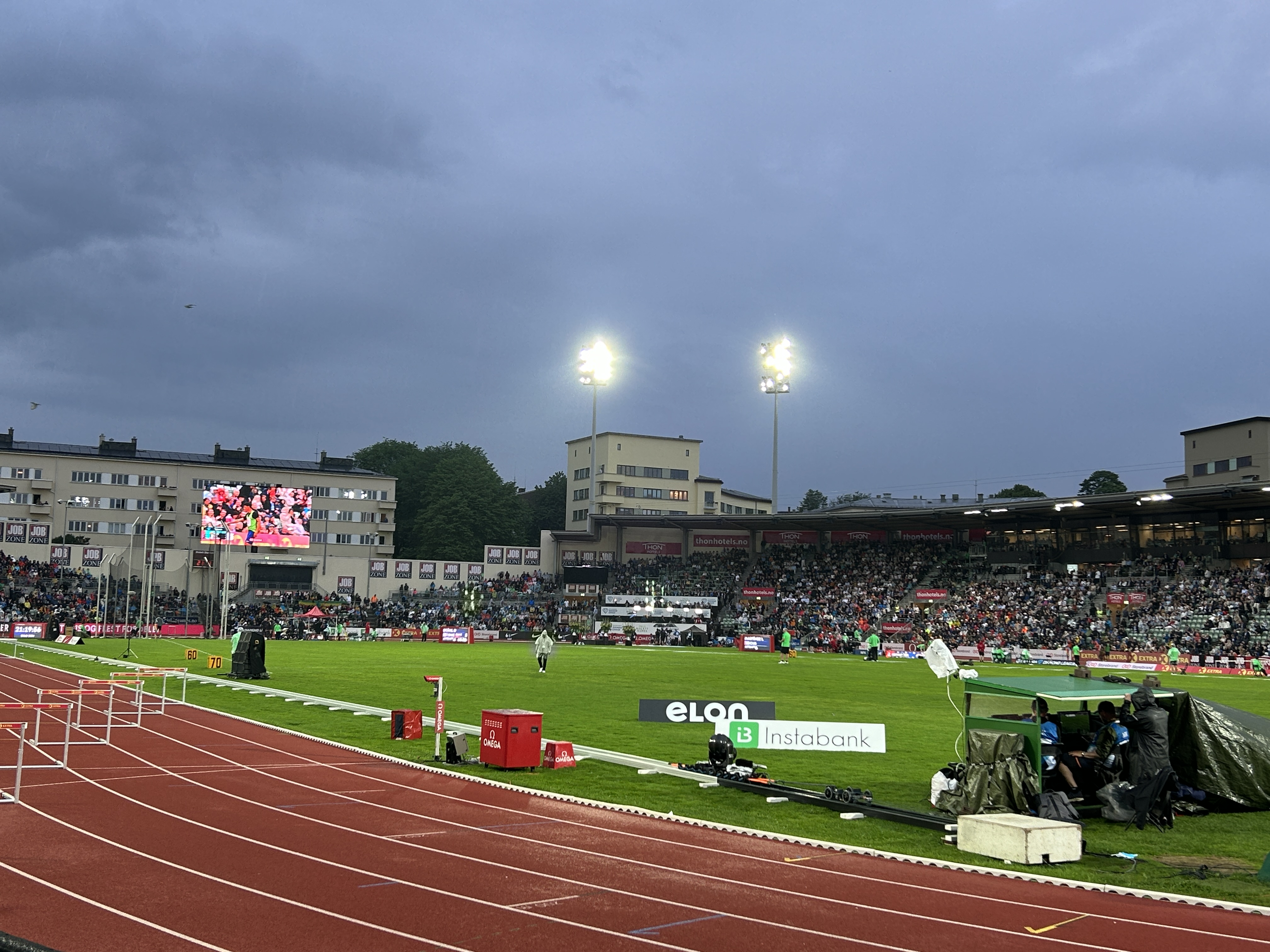
- Level: 2016 Diamond League

The 2016 Bislett Games was the 52nd edition of the annual outdoor track and field meeting in Oslo, Norway. Held on 9 June at Bislett Stadium, it was the seventh leg of the 2016 Diamond League – the highest level international track and field circuit.

== Diamond discipline results ==
A revised points system was introduced during the 2016 Diamond League season where athletes earned points towards a season leaderboard (10-6-4-2-1 respectively), points per event were then doubled in the Diamond League Finals. Athletes had to take part in the Diamond race during the finals to be eligible to win the Diamond trophy which is awarded to the athlete with the most points at the end of the season.

=== Men's ===
100 metres
Rank	Athlete	Nation	Time	Points	Notes
1st place, gold medalist(s)	Andre De Grasse	Canada	10.07	10	SB
2nd place, silver medalist(s)	Mike Rodgers	United States	10.09	6	
3rd place, bronze medalist(s)	Dentarius Locke	United States	10.12	4	=SB
4	Ameer Webb	United States	10.18	3	
5	Christophe Lemaitre	France	10.20	2	
6	Sean McLean	United States	10.32	1	
7	Wilfried Koffi Hua	Ivory Coast	10.35		
8	Kim Collins	Saint Kitts and Nevis	11.59		
			Wind: (+0.6 m/s)		

Mile
Rank	Athlete	Nation	Time	Points	Notes
1st place, gold medalist(s)	Asbel Kiprop	Kenya	3:51.48	10	WL
2nd place, silver medalist(s)	Elijah Manangoi	Kenya	3:52.04	6	PB
3rd place, bronze medalist(s)	Taoufik Makhloufi	Algeria	3:52.24	4	SB
4	Nick Willis	New Zealand	3:52.26	3	SB
5	Ryan Gregson	Australia	3:52.59	2	
6	Charlie Grice	Great Britain	3:52.85	1	
7	Henrik Ingebrigtsen	Norway	3:53.19		
8	Filip Ingebrigtsen	Norway	3:55.02		
9	Robert Biwott	Kenya	3:55.62		
10	Pieter-Jan Hannes	Belgium	3:58.53		
—	Andrew Kiptoo Rotich	Kenya	DNF		PM
—	James Kiplagat Magut	Kenya	DNF		PM

5000 metres
Rank	Athlete	Nation	Time	Points	Notes
1st place, gold medalist(s)	Hagos Gebrhiwet	Ethiopia	13:07.70	10	
2nd place, silver medalist(s)	Muktar Edris	Ethiopia	13:08.11	6	
3rd place, bronze medalist(s)	Yomif Kejelcha	Ethiopia	13:08.34	4	
4	Abdalaati Iguider	Morocco	13:08.61	3	
5	Isiah Koech	Kenya	13:10.18	2	
6	Dejen Gebremeskel	Ethiopia	13:10.68	1	
7	Abadi Hadis	Ethiopia	13:11.45		
8	Hayle Ibrahimov	Azerbaijan	13:13.92		
9	Thomas Longosiwa	Kenya	13:14.51		
10	Yenew Alamirew	Ethiopia	13:16.99		
11	Edwin Soi	Kenya	13:23.19		
12	Dejene Debela	Ethiopia	13:27.44		SB
13	Aweke Ayalew	Brunei	13:28.11		
14	Brett Robinson	Australia	13:44.51		
15	Sindre Buraas	Norway	13:52.21		
16	Awet Nftalem Kibrab	Eritrea	13:59.72		
—	Cornelius Kangogo	Kenya	DNF		PM
—	Vincent Kipsang Rono	Kenya	DNF		PM

400 metres hurdles
Rank	Athlete	Nation	Time	Points	Notes
1st place, gold medalist(s)	Yasmani Copello	Turkey	48.79	10	SB
2nd place, silver medalist(s)	Javier Culson	Puerto Rico	48.99	6	SB
3rd place, bronze medalist(s)	Michael Tinsley	United States	49.02	4	
4	Kerron Clement	United States	49.61	3	
5	Karsten Warholm	Norway	49.80	2	
6	Nicholas Bett	Kenya	49.85	1	
7	Patryk Dobek	Poland	50.27		
8	Øyvind Strømmen Kjerpeset	Norway	50.98		

Pole vault
Rank	Athlete	Nation	Height	Points	Notes
1st place, gold medalist(s)	Renaud Lavillenie	France	5.80 m	10	
2nd place, silver medalist(s)	Shawn Barber	Canada	5.73 m	6	
3rd place, bronze medalist(s)	Paweł Wojciechowski	Poland	5.65 m	4	
4	Stanley Joseph	France	5.55 m	3	
5	Xue Changrui	China	5.40 m	2	
6	Eirik Greibrokk Dolve	Norway	5.25 m	1	
—	Robert Sobera	Poland	NM		

Triple jump
Rank	Athlete	Nation	Distance	Points	Notes
1st place, gold medalist(s)	Alexis Copello	Azerbaijan	16.91 m (+0.2 m/s)	10	
2nd place, silver medalist(s)	Teddy Tamgho	France	16.80 m (−0.2 m/s)	6	SB
3rd place, bronze medalist(s)	Max Heß	Germany	16.69 m (+0.3 m/s)	4	
4	Chris Benard	United States	16.66 m (−0.3 m/s)	3	
5	Omar Craddock	United States	16.48 m (+0.2 m/s)	2	
6	Troy Doris	Guyana	16.48 m (+0.0 m/s)	1	
7	Nelson Évora	Portugal	16.38 m (+0.7 m/s)		
8	Godfrey Khotso Mokoena	South Africa	16.08 m (−0.2 m/s)		

Shot put
Rank	Athlete	Nation	Distance	Points	Notes
1st place, gold medalist(s)	Joe Kovacs	United States	22.01 m	10	
2nd place, silver medalist(s)	Konrad Bukowiecki	Poland	21.14 m	6	PB
3rd place, bronze medalist(s)	Tomasz Majewski	Poland	20.56 m	4	
4	Tim Nedow	Canada	20.40 m	3	
5	Asmir Kolašinac	Serbia	19.84 m	2	
6	O'Dayne Richards	Jamaica	19.14 m	1	
7	Marcus Thomsen	Norway	17.68 m		PB

Javelin throw
Rank	Athlete	Nation	Distance	Points	Notes
1st place, gold medalist(s)	Thomas Röhler	Germany	22.01 m	10	WL
2nd place, silver medalist(s)	Johannes Vetter	Germany	21.14 m	6	PB
3rd place, bronze medalist(s)	Keshorn Walcott	Trinidad and Tobago	20.56 m	4	SB
4	Hamish Peacock	Australia	20.40 m	3	
~~5~~	~~Ihab Abdelrahman~~	~~Egypt~~	~~19.84 m~~	~~2~~	DQ (Note: Due to doping violations Abdelrahman's results from this competition were disqualified.)
6	Jakub Vadlejch	Czech Republic	19.14 m	1	
7	Julius Yego	Kenya	17.68 m		
8	Andreas Hofmann	Germany	17.68 m		
9	Ryohei Arai	Japan	17.68 m		

=== Women's ===
200 metres
Rank	Athlete	Nation	Time	Points	Notes
1st place, gold medalist(s)	Dafne Schippers	Netherlands	21.93	10	DRL, MR, WL
2nd place, silver medalist(s)	Elaine Thompson-Herah	Jamaica	22.64	6	
3rd place, bronze medalist(s)	Ivet Lalova-Collio	Bulgaria	22.78	4	SB
4	Simone Facey	Jamaica	22.88	3	
5	Jodie Williams	Great Britain	23.29	2	
6	Rosângela Santos	Brazil	23.65	1	SB
7	Helene Rønningen	Norway	24.21		
—	Kimberly Hyacinthe	Canada	DQ		R 163.3b
			Wind: (+0.7 m/s)		

400 metres
Rank	Athlete	Nation	Time	Points	Notes
1st place, gold medalist(s)	Stephenie Ann McPherson	Jamaica	51.04	10	
2nd place, silver medalist(s)	Natasha Hastings	United States	51.38	6	
3rd place, bronze medalist(s)	Novlene Williams-Mills	Jamaica	51.66	4	
4	Anyika Onuora	Great Britain	51.85	3	
5	Morgan Mitchell	Australia	51.92	2	
6	Libania Grenot	Italy	52.03	1	
7	Marie Gayot	France	52.21		SB
8	Line Kloster	Norway	54.04		

Mile
Rank	Athlete	Nation	Time	Points	Notes
1st place, gold medalist(s)	Faith Kipyegon	Kenya	4:18.60	10	WL
2nd place, silver medalist(s)	Laura Muir	Great Britain	4:19.12	6	
3rd place, bronze medalist(s)	Meraf Bahta	Sweden	4:25.26	4	PB
4	Sofia Ennaoui	Poland	4:25.34	3	PB
5	Angelika Cichocka	Poland	4:25.39	2	NR
6	Karoline Bjerkeli Grøvdal	Norway	4:26.23	1	
7	Gesa Felicitas Krause	Germany	4:29.58		
8	Axumawit Embaye	Ethiopia	4:29.59		
9	Nancy Chepkwemoi	Kenya	4:30.67		
10	Ingvill Måkestad Bovim	Norway	4:31.57		
11	Nuria Fernández	Spain	4:33.88		
—	Jenny Meadows	Great Britain	DNF		PM

100 metres hurdles
Rank	Athlete	Nation	Time	Points	Notes
1st place, gold medalist(s)	Brianna Rollins-McNeal	United States	21.93	12.56	
2nd place, silver medalist(s)	Dawn Harper-Nelson	United States	22.64	12.75	SB
3rd place, bronze medalist(s)	Jasmin Stowers	United States	22.78	12.79	
4	Tiffany Porter	Great Britain	22.88	12.94	
5	Cindy Roleder	Germany	23.29	12.94	
6	Isabelle Pedersen	Norway	23.65	13.12	SB
7	Sally Pearson	Australia	24.21	13.14	SB
—	Alina Talay	Belarus	DQ		R 162.7
			Wind: (−0.4 m/s)		

3000 metres steeplechase
Rank	Athlete	Nation	Time	Points	Notes
1st place, gold medalist(s)	Hyvin Jepkemoi	Kenya	9:09.57	10	
2nd place, silver medalist(s)	Sofia Assefa	Ethiopia	9:18.53	6	
3rd place, bronze medalist(s)	Etenesh Diro	Ethiopia	9:19.40	4	
4	Madeline Heiner	Australia	9:24.73	3	SB
5	Charlotta Fougberg	Sweden	9:30.11	2	SB
6	Genevieve Gregson	Australia	9:30.52	1	PB
7	Lydiah Chepkurui	Kenya	9:32.48		
8	Tigest Getent	Bahrain	9:42.23		SB
9	Claire Perraux	France	9:55.77		SB
10	Buzuayehu Mohamed	Ethiopia	10:01.01		
—	Fancy Cherotich	Kenya	DNF		PM
—	Caroline Chepkurui	Kenya	DNF		PM

High jump
Rank	Athlete	Nation	Height	Points	Notes
1st place, gold medalist(s)	Ruth Beitia	Spain	1.90 m	10	
2nd place, silver medalist(s)	Sofie Skoog	Sweden	1.85 m	6	
2nd place, silver medalist(s)	Tonje Angelsen	Norway	1.85 m	6	
2nd place, silver medalist(s)	Michaela Hrubá	Czech Republic	1.85 m	6	
5	Kamila Lićwinko	Poland	1.85 m	2	
6	Erika Kinsey	Sweden	1.85 m	1	
7	Marie-Laurence Jungfleisch	Germany	1.80 m		
7	Levern Spencer	Saint Lucia	1.80 m		
7	Alessia Trost	Italy	1.80 m		
10	Katarina Mögenburg	Norway	1.80 m		

Long jump
Rank	Athlete	Nation	Distance	Points	Notes
1st place, gold medalist(s)	Ivana Španović	Serbia	6.94 m (−0.5 m/s)	10	
2nd place, silver medalist(s)	Christabel Nettey	Canada	6.68 m (+0.2 m/s)	6	
3rd place, bronze medalist(s)	Shara Proctor	Great Britain	6.67 m (+2.2 m/s)	4	
4	Tianna Bartoletta	United States	6.65 m (+0.2 m/s)	3	
5	Ksenija Balta	Estonia	6.61 m (−0.8 m/s)	2	
6	Alexandra Wester	Germany	6.42 m (+1.0 m/s)	1	
7	Nadia Akpana Assa	Norway	6.39 m (−0.9 m/s)		
8	Erica Jarder	Sweden	6.24 m (+0.5 m/s)		
9	Funmi Jimoh	United States	6.16 m (+0.0 m/s)		
10	Janay DeLoach Soukup	United States	5.95 m (+0.4 m/s)		
—	Margrethe Renstrøm	Norway	NM		
Best wind-legal performances
	Shara Proctor	Great Britain	6.66 m (−0.8 m/s)		

Discus throw
Rank	Athlete	Nation	Distance	Points	Notes
1st place, gold medalist(s)	Sandra Elkasević	Croatia	67.10 m	10	
2nd place, silver medalist(s)	Nadine Müller	Germany	63.09 m	6	
3rd place, bronze medalist(s)	Denia Caballero	Cuba	62.65 m	4	
4	Shanice Craft	Germany	62.08 m	3	
5	Yaime Pérez	Cuba	61.91 m	2	
6	Jade Lally	Great Britain	59.56 m	1	
7	Whitney Ashley	United States	59.39 m		

== National events results ==
=== Men's ===
100 metres
Rank	Athlete	Nation	Time	Notes
1st place, gold medalist(s)	Morten DalgåRD Madsen	Denmark	10.48	SB
2nd place, silver medalist(s)	Kjell Håkon Morken	Norway	10.59	PB
3rd place, bronze medalist(s)	Christian Marthinussen	Norway	10.80	
4	Jostein Joshua Fossøy	Norway	10.80	=PB
5	Michael Rosenberg	Norway	10.85	
6	Kristoffer Buhagen	Norway	35.72	
—	Jonathan Quarcoo	Norway	DQ	R 162.7
			Wind: (+1.2 m/s)	

200 metres
Rank	Athlete	Nation	Time	Notes
1st place, gold medalist(s)	Kjell Håkon Morken	Norway	21.38	SB
2nd place, silver medalist(s)	Mathias Hove Johansen	Norway	21.58	
3rd place, bronze medalist(s)	Torbjørn Lysne	Norway	21.61	SB
4	Øystein Klareng	Norway	21.73	
5	Henrik Overvåg	Norway	21.82	
6	Nivethan Panchalingam	Norway	21.93	PB
7	Nickolai Jallow	Norway	22.29	
			Wind: (+0.1 m/s)	

400 metres
Rank	Athlete	Nation	Time	Notes
1st place, gold medalist(s)	Mauritz Kåshagen	Norway	47.19	
2nd place, silver medalist(s)	Terrence Agard	Netherlands	47.55	
3rd place, bronze medalist(s)	Nick Ekelund-Arenander	Sweden	48.35	
4	Joachim Sandberg	Norway	48.35	
5	Josh-Kevin Ramirez Talm	Norway	48.50	
6	Martin Loftås Kåstad	Norway	48.75	
7	Toralv Opsal	Norway	49.03	
8	Sondre Dingsør Skogen	Norway	49.25	

800 metres
Rank	Athlete	Nation	Time	Notes
1st place, gold medalist(s)	Yeimer López	Cuba	1:45.75	SB
2nd place, silver medalist(s)	Alberto Mamba	Mozambique	1:46.32	NR
3rd place, bronze medalist(s)	Kalle Berglund	Sweden	1:47.45	
4	Richard Douma	Netherlands	1:48.28	PB
5	Emil Oustad	Norway	1:50.30	
6	Andreas Roth	Norway	1:50.59	
7	Sverre Blom Breivik	Norway	1:51.17	PB
8	Jozef Repčík	Slovakia	1:51.62	
9	Markus Einan	Norway	1:52.50	
—	Håkon Henriksen	Norway	DNF	PM
—	Andreas Kramer	Sweden	DNS	

1500 metres
Rank	Athlete	Nation	Time	Notes
1st place, gold medalist(s)	Luke Mathews	Australia	3:37.99	
2nd place, silver medalist(s)	Snorre Holtan Løken	Norway	3:38.63	
3rd place, bronze medalist(s)	Jake Wightman	Great Britain	3:38.83	
4	Charles Philibert-Thiboutot	Canada	3:38.96	
5	Andreas Bueno	Denmark	3:39.85	SB
6	Johan Rogestedt	Sweden	3:40.29	PB
7	Tom Lancashire	Great Britain	3:41.46	
8	Dmitrijs Jurkevičs	Latvia	3:42.38	
9	Jakob Ingebrigtsen	Norway	3:42.44	PB
10	Hans Kristian Fløystad	Norway	3:43.19	SB
11	Jonas Glans	Sweden	3:43.46	
12	Staffan Ek	Sweden	3:44.00	
13	Johan Walldén	Sweden	3:45.25	SB
14	Sindre Løchting	Norway	3:46.84	
15	Thomas Jefferson Byrkjeland	Norway	3:53.82	
16	Anders Sørensen	Norway	3:54.47	
17	Sondre Juven	Norway	4:00.27	
—	Reuben Bett	Kenya	DNF	
—	Sigurd Blom Breivik	Norway	DNF	
—	Magnus Hannevig Pettersen	Norway	DNF	PM

=== Women's ===
200 metres
Rank	Athlete	Nation	Time	Notes
1st place, gold medalist(s)	Ida Bakke Hansen	Norway	23.84	PB
2nd place, silver medalist(s)	Ida Eikeng	Norway	24.02	
3rd place, bronze medalist(s)	Astrid Mangen Ingebrigtsen	Norway	24.23	
4	Ingvild Meinseth	Norway	24.27	PB
5	Tonje Fjellet Kristiansen	Norway	24.45	PB
6	Agathe Holtan Wathne	Norway	24.46	PB
7	Live Haugstad Hilton	Norway	24.51	PB
8	Mari Gilde Brubak	Norway	24.83	
			Wind: (+0.9 m/s)	

400 metres
Rank	Athlete	Nation	Time	Notes
1st place, gold medalist(s)	Laura de Witte	Netherlands	53.00	PB
2nd place, silver medalist(s)	Benedicte Hauge	Norway	53.81	PB
3rd place, bronze medalist(s)	Emily Rose Norum	Norway	54.47	
4	Sara Dorthea Jensen	Norway	54.47	SB
5	Josefine Tomine Eriksen	Norway	55.22	
6	Christine Bjelland Jensen	Norway	55.42	
7	Anne Skudal Dolvik	Norway	55.66	
8	Tara Marie Norum	Norway	55.74	SB

800 metres
Rank	Athlete	Nation	Time	Notes
1st place, gold medalist(s)	Lovisa Lindh	Sweden	2:00.51	PB
2nd place, silver medalist(s)	Sanne Verstegen	Netherlands	2:01.36	SB
3rd place, bronze medalist(s)	Trine Mjåland	Norway	2:01.96	SB
4	Hedda Hynne	Norway	2:02.20	PB
5	Yngvild Elvemo	Norway	2:02.34	
6	Anna Silvander	Sweden	2:02.60	SB
7	Brittany McGowan	Australia	2:03.22	
8	Malin Edland	Norway	2:04.76	SB
9	Ida Fillingsnes	Norway	2:05.33	
10	Selma Kajan	Australia	2:06.00	
—	Martine Eikemo Borge	Norway	DNF	PM

1500 metres
Rank	Athlete	Nation	Time	Notes
1st place, gold medalist(s)	Manon Kruiver	Netherlands	4:16.22	
2nd place, silver medalist(s)	Kristine Eikrem Engeset	Norway	4:25.53	
3rd place, bronze medalist(s)	Elisabeth Angell Bergh	Norway	4:25.81	
4	Sigrid Jervell Våg	Norway	4:30.38	PB
5	Anniken Johansen	Norway	4:30.53	PB
6	Camilla Ziesler	Norway	4:31.02	
7	Christina Maria Toogood	Norway	4:31.05	
8	Ida Elise Nymoen Eltervaag	Norway	4:31.97	PB
9	Maria Sagnes Wågan	Norway	4:32.99	PB
10	Kristine Lande Dommersnes	Norway	4:37.24	PB
11	Vilde Våge Henriksen	Norway	4:38.86	PB
12	Helena Siltberg	Sweden	4:39.00	
13	Caroline Høistad Foss	Norway	4:47.68	

== See also ==
- 2016 Diamond League
