= 2023 Bislett Games =

- Dates: 15 June 2023
- Host city: Oslo, Norway
- Venue: Bislett Stadium
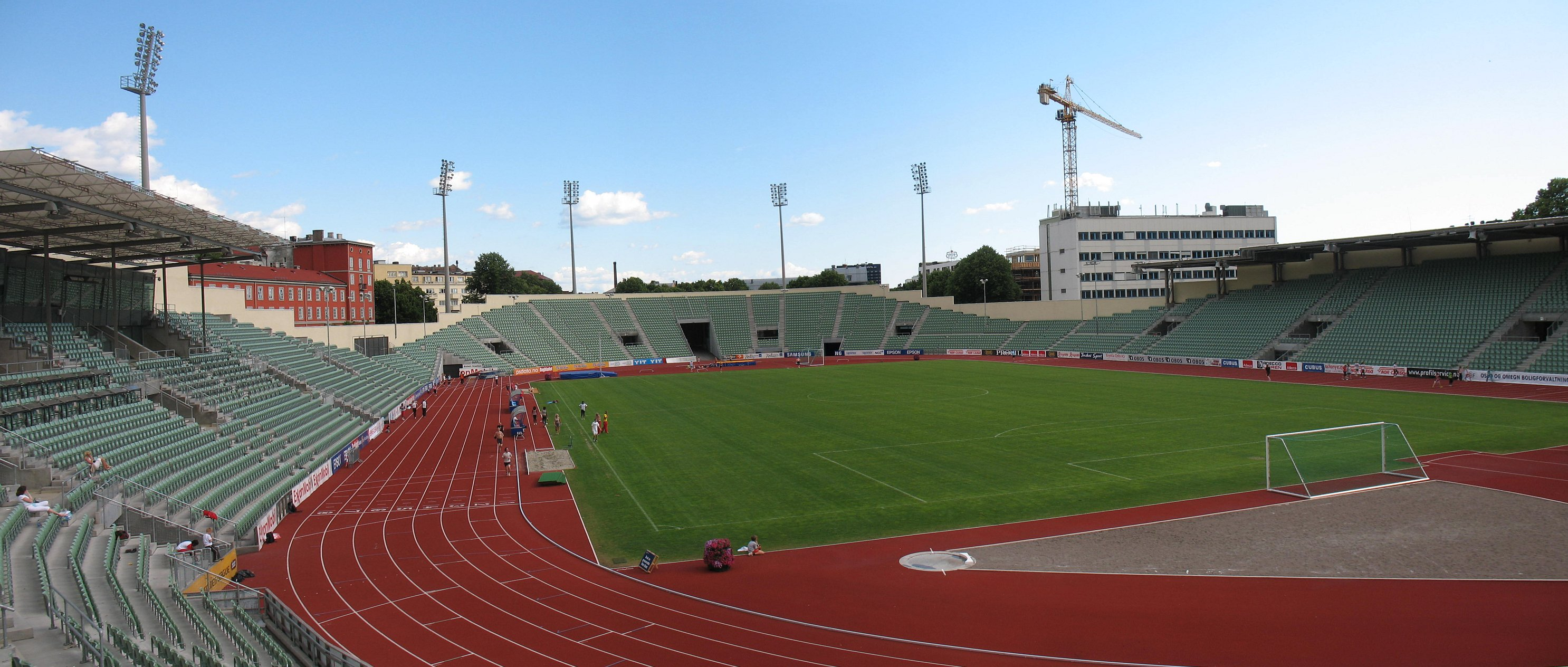
- Level: 2023 Diamond League

The 2023 Bislett Games was the 58th edition of the annual outdoor track and field meeting in Oslo, Norway. Held on 15 June at Bislett Stadium, it was the sixth leg of the 2023 Diamond League – the highest level international track and field circuit.

The highlight of the meeting was the men's 5000 metres, where Jacob Kiplimo and Yomif Kejelcha battled to the line in a photo finish with both runners being awarded a time of 12:41.73 seconds, but Kejelcha being deemed the winner. It was the first time in history that any person had ever run under 12:45 in the 5000 m while still being contested at the finish by another competitor. Reigning Olympic champion Jakob Ingebrigtsen set a personal best in the 1500 metres, running under 3:28 for the first time.

== Results ==
Athletes competing in the Diamond League disciplines earned extra compensation and points which went towards qualifying for the Diamond League finals in Eugene. First place earned eight points, with each step down in place earning one less point than the previous, until no points are awarded in ninth place or lower.

=== Diamond Discipline ===
Men's 200m (+0.6 m/s)
| Place | Athlete | Country | Time | Points |
|---|---|---|---|---|
| 1st place, gold medalist(s) | Erriyon Knighton | United States | 19.77 | 8 |
| 2nd place, silver medalist(s) | Reynier Mena | Cuba | 20.09 | 7 |
| 3rd place, bronze medalist(s) | Joseph Fahnbulleh | Liberia | 20.23 | 6 |
| 4 | Alexander Ogando | Dominican Republic | 20.27 | 5 |
| 5 | Andre De Grasse | Canada | 20.33 | 4 |
| 6 | Joshua Hartmann | Germany | 20.39 | 3 |
| 7 | Mouhamadou Fall | France | 20.65 | 2 |
| 8 | Luxolo Adams | South Africa | 20.79 | 1 |

Men's 400m
| Place | Athlete | Country | Time | Points |
|---|---|---|---|---|
| 1st place, gold medalist(s) | Wayde van Niekerk | South Africa | 44.38 | 8 |
| 2nd place, silver medalist(s) | Muzala Samukonga | Zambia | 44.49 | 7 |
| 3rd place, bronze medalist(s) | Vernon Norwood | United States | 44.51 | 6 |
| 4 | Håvard Bentdal Ingvaldsen | Norway | 44.86 | 5 |
| 5 | Matthew Hudson-Smith | Great Britain | 44.92 | 4 |
| 6 | Bayapo Ndori | Botswana | 44.99 | 3 |
| 7 | Zakithi Nene | South Africa | 45.34 | 2 |
| 8 | Anthony Zambrano | Colombia | 46.45 | 1 |

Men's 1500m
| Place | Athlete | Country | Time | Points |
|---|---|---|---|---|
| 1st place, gold medalist(s) | Jakob Ingebrigtsen | Norway | 3:27.95 | 8 |
| 2nd place, silver medalist(s) | Mohamed Katir | Spain | 3:28.89 | 7 |
| 3rd place, bronze medalist(s) | Yared Nuguse | United States | 3:29.02 | 6 |
| 4 | Timothy Cheruiyot | Kenya | 3:29.08 | 5 |
| 5 | Mario García | Spain | 3:29.18 | 4 |
| 6 | Azeddine Habz | France | 3:29.26 | 3 |
| 7 | Ollie Hoare | Australia | 3:29.41 | 2 |
| 8 | Narve Gilje Nordås | Norway | 3:29.47 | 1 |
| 9 | Josh Kerr | Great Britain | 3:30.07 | |
| 10 | Neil Gourley | Great Britain | 3:30.88 | |
| 11 | Abel Kipsang | Kenya | 3:31.76 | |
| 12 | Andreas Almgren | Sweden | 3:32.00 | |
| 13 | Teddese Lemi | Ethiopia | 3:32.24 | |
| 14 | Charles Grethen | Luxembourg | 3:36.27 | |
| | Filip Ingebrigtsen | Norway | DNF | |
| | Boaz Kiprugut | Kenya | DNF | |
| | Mounir Akbache | France | DNF | |

Men's 5000m
| Place | Athlete | Country | Time | Points |
|---|---|---|---|---|
| 1st place, gold medalist(s) | Yomif Kejelcha | Ethiopia | 12:41.73 | 8 |
| 2nd place, silver medalist(s) | Jacob Kiplimo | Uganda | 12:41.73 | 7 |
| 3rd place, bronze medalist(s) | Telahun Haile Bekele | Ethiopia | 12:46.21 | 6 |
| 4 | Joe Klecker | United States | 12:56.59 | 5 |
| 5 | Luis Grijalva | Guatemala | 12:56.63 | 4 |
| 6 | Thierry Ndikumwenayo | Spain | 12:58.60 | 3 |
| 7 | Samuel Tefera | Ethiopia | 13:02.09 | 2 |
| 8 | Ishmael Kipkurui | Kenya | 13:05.47 | 1 |
| 9 | Paul Chelimo | United States | 13:06.78 | |
| 10 | Magnus Tuv Myhre | Norway | 13:09.44 | |
| 11 | Henrik Ingebrigtsen | Norway | 13:18.04 | |
| 12 | Adel Mechaal | Spain | 13:22.31 | |
| 13 | Cornelius Kemboi | Kenya | 13:22.35 | |
| 14 | Zerei Kbrom Mezngi | Norway | 13:27.31 | |
| 15 | Awet Nftalem Kibrab | Norway | 13:30.96 | |
| 16 | Jack Rayner | Australia | 13:38.11 | |
| | Callum Davies | Australia | DNF | |
| | Žan Rudolf | Slovenia | DNF | |
| | Fredrik Sandvik | Norway | DNF | |

Men's 400mH
| Place | Athlete | Country | Time | Points |
|---|---|---|---|---|
| 1st place, gold medalist(s) | Karsten Warholm | Norway | 46.52 | 8 |
| 2nd place, silver medalist(s) | CJ Allen | United States | 47.58 | 7 |
| 3rd place, bronze medalist(s) | Wilfried Happio | France | 48.13 | 6 |
| 4 | Ludvy Vaillant | France | 48.59 | 5 |
| 5 | Trevor Bassitt | United States | 48.63 | 4 |
| 6 | Khallifah Rosser | United States | 48.87 | 3 |
| 7 | Abdelmalik Lahoulou | Algeria | 49.27 | 2 |
| 8 | Julien Watrin | Belgium | 49.45 | 1 |

Men's Pole Vault
| Place | Athlete | Country | Mark | Points |
|---|---|---|---|---|
| 1st place, gold medalist(s) | Armand Duplantis | Sweden | 6.01 m | 8 |
| 2nd place, silver medalist(s) | Chris Nilsen | United States | 5.91 m | 7 |
| 3rd place, bronze medalist(s) | EJ Obiena | Philippines | 5.81 m | 6 |
| 4 | Sam Kendricks | United States | 5.71 m | 5 |
| 5 | Ben Broeders | Belgium | 5.71 m | 4 |
| 6 | Sondre Guttormsen | Norway | 5.71 m | 3 |
| 7 | Pål Haugen Lillefosse | Norway | 5.61 m | 2 |
| 8 | Bo Kanda Lita Baehre | Germany | 5.41 m | 1 |
| 9 | Renaud Lavillenie | France | 5.41 m | |
| | Simen Guttormsen | Norway | NM | |

Men's Long Jump
| Place | Athlete | Country | Mark | Points |
|---|---|---|---|---|
| 1st place, gold medalist(s) | Simon Ehammer | Switzerland | 8.32 m (±0.0 m/s) | 8 |
| 2nd place, silver medalist(s) | Marquis Dendy | United States | 8.26 m (+0.6 m/s) | 7 |
| 3rd place, bronze medalist(s) | Miltiadis Tentoglou | Greece | 8.21 m (−0.5 m/s) | 6 |
| 4 | Steffin McCarter | United States | 8.04 m (+0.8 m/s) | 5 |
| 5 | Thobias Montler | Sweden | 8.01 m (−0.2 m/s) | 4 |
| 6 | Tajay Gayle | Jamaica | 7.87 m (+1.0 m/s) | 3 |
| 7 | Ingar Bratseth-Kiplesund | Norway | 7.75 m (+0.2 m/s) | 2 |
| 8 | Sander Skotheim | Norway | 7.74 m (+0.1 m/s) | 1 |
| 9 | Henrik Flåtnes | Norway | 7.66 m (+0.3 m/s) | |

Women's 100m (+0.9 m/s)
| Place | Athlete | Country | Time | Points |
|---|---|---|---|---|
| 1st place, gold medalist(s) | Marie-Josée Ta Lou | Ivory Coast | 10.75 | 8 |
| 2nd place, silver medalist(s) | Anthonique Strachan | Bahamas | 10.92 | 7 |
| 3rd place, bronze medalist(s) | Shericka Jackson | Jamaica | 10.98 | 6 |
| 4 | Dina Asher-Smith | Great Britain | 10.98 | 5 |
| 5 | Daryll Neita | Great Britain | 10.98 | 4 |
| 6 | Ewa Swoboda | Poland | 11.07 | 3 |
| 7 | Imani-Lara Lansiquot | Great Britain | 11.10 | 2 |
| 8 | Gina Bass | Gambia | 11.22 | 1 |

Women's Mile
| Place | Athlete | Country | Time | Points |
|---|---|---|---|---|
| 1st place, gold medalist(s) | Birke Haylom | Ethiopia | 4:17.13 | 8 |
| 2nd place, silver medalist(s) | Cory McGee | United States | 4:18.11 | 7 |
| 3rd place, bronze medalist(s) | Jessica Hull | Australia | 4:18.24 | 6 |
| 4 | Nikki Hiltz | United States | 4:18.38 | 5 |
| 5 | Worknesh Mesele | Ethiopia | 4:19.09 | 4 |
| 6 | Linden Hall | Australia | 4:19.60 | 3 |
| 7 | Hirut Meshesha | Ethiopia | 4:20.00 | 2 |
| 8 | Winnie Nanyondo | Uganda | 4:20.03 | 1 |
| 9 | Josette Andrews | United States | 4:21.98 | |
| 10 | Ciara Mageean | Ireland | 4:22.03 | |
| 11 | Axumawit Embaye | Ethiopia | 4:24.01 | |
| 12 | Claudia Bobocea | Romania | 4:25.02 | |
| 13 | Gabriela DeBues-Stafford | Canada | 4:32.59 | |
| | Ellie Sanford | Australia | DNF | |
| | Janat Chemusto | Uganda | DQ | |

Women's 3000m
| Place | Athlete | Country | Time | Points |
|---|---|---|---|---|
| 1st place, gold medalist(s) | Beatrice Chebet | Kenya | 8:25.01 | 8 |
| 2nd place, silver medalist(s) | Lilian Kasait Rengeruk | Kenya | 8:25.90 | 7 |
| 3rd place, bronze medalist(s) | Margaret Kipkemboi | Kenya | 8:26.14 | 6 |
| 4 | Alicia Monson | United States | 8:29.43 | 5 |
| 5 | Weini Kelati | United States | 8:32.50 | 4 |
| 6 | Sarah Chelangat | Uganda | 8:32.53 | 3 |
| 7 | Agnes Jebet Ngetich | Kenya | 8:32.62 | 2 |
| 8 | Caroline Nyaga | Kenya | 8:34.85 | 1 |
| 9 | Maureen Koster | Netherlands | 8:35.93 | |
| 10 | Elly Henes | United States | 8:36.86 | |
| 11 | Emily Infeld | United States | 8:41.29 | |
| 12 | Hawi Feysa | Ethiopia | 8:49.89 | |
| 13 | Jessica Warner-Judd | Great Britain | 8:53.10 | |
| 14 | Diane van Es | Netherlands | 8:56.28 | |
| | Sarah Billings | Australia | DNF | |

Women's 400mH
| Place | Athlete | Country | Time | Points |
|---|---|---|---|---|
| 1st place, gold medalist(s) | Femke Bol | Netherlands | 52.30 | 8 |
| 2nd place, silver medalist(s) | Rushell Clayton | Jamaica | 53.84 | 7 |
| 3rd place, bronze medalist(s) | Gianna Woodruff | Panama | 54.46 | 6 |
| 4 | Janieve Russell | Jamaica | 54.91 | 5 |
| 5 | Anna Hall | United States | 55.28 | 4 |
| 6 | Viktoriya Tkachuk | Ukraine | 55.36 | 3 |
| 7 | Anna Ryzhykova | Ukraine | 55.53 | 2 |
| 8 | Line Kloster | Norway | 56.44 | 1 |

Women's Triple Jump
| Place | Athlete | Country | Mark | Points |
|---|---|---|---|---|
| 1st place, gold medalist(s) | Yulimar Rojas | Venezuela | 14.91 m (+2.1 m/s) | 8 |
| 2nd place, silver medalist(s) | Leyanis Pérez | Cuba | 14.87 m (+1.4 m/s) | 7 |
| 3rd place, bronze medalist(s) | Maryna Bekh-Romanchuk | Ukraine | 14.75 m (−0.4 m/s) | 6 |
| 4 | Shanieka Ricketts | Jamaica | 14.33 m (+0.8 m/s) | 5 |
| 5 | Thea LaFond | Dominica | 14.21 m (−0.1 m/s) | 4 |
| 6 | Tori Franklin | United States | 14.16 m (−0.4 m/s) | 3 |
| 7 | Keturah Orji | United States | 14.15 m (+0.9 m/s) | 2 |
| 8 | Maja Åskag | Sweden | 13.73 m (+0.6 m/s) | 1 |
Best wind-legal performances
| — | Yulimar Rojas | Venezuela | 14.86 m (+0.4 m/s) | |

Women's Shot Put
| Place | Athlete | Country | Mark | Points |
|---|---|---|---|---|
| 1st place, gold medalist(s) | Sarah Mitton | Canada | 19.54 m | 8 |
| 2nd place, silver medalist(s) | Maggie Ewen | United States | 19.52 m | 7 |
| 3rd place, bronze medalist(s) | Danniel Thomas-Dodd | Jamaica | 19.44 m | 6 |
| 4 | Chase Ealey | United States | 19.44 m | 5 |
| 5 | Auriol Dongmo | Portugal | 19.44 m | 4 |
| 6 | Adelaide Aquilla | United States | 19.17 m | 3 |
| 7 | Axelina Johansson | Sweden | 18.72 m | 2 |
| 8 | Sara Gambetta | Germany | 18.37 m | 1 |
| | Jessica Schilder | Netherlands | NM | |
| | Fanny Roos | Sweden | NM | |

Women's Discus Throw
| Place | Athlete | Country | Mark | Points |
|---|---|---|---|---|
| 1st place, gold medalist(s) | Jorinde van Klinken | Netherlands | 66.77 m | 8 |
| 2nd place, silver medalist(s) | Valarie Allman | United States | 66.18 m | 7 |
| 3rd place, bronze medalist(s) | Sandra Perković | Croatia | 65.26 m | 6 |
| 4 | Claudine Vita | Germany | 62.96 m | 5 |
| 5 | Kristin Pudenz | Germany | 62.82 m | 4 |
| 6 | Liliana Cá | Portugal | 61.47 m | 3 |
| 7 | Shanice Craft | Germany | 60.73 m | 2 |
| 8 | Mélina Robert-Michon | France | 60.64 m | 1 |

=== Promotional events ===
Men's Hammer Throw
| Place | Athlete | Country | Mark |
|---|---|---|---|
| 1st place, gold medalist(s) | Wojciech Nowicki | Poland | 81.92 m |
| 2nd place, silver medalist(s) | Rudy Winkler | United States | 79.42 m |
| 3rd place, bronze medalist(s) | Ethan Katzberg | Canada | 77.93 m |
| 4 | Eivind Henriksen | Norway | 76.52 m |
| 5 | Paweł Fajdek | Poland | 76.50 m |
| 6 | Bence Halász | Hungary | 75.26 m |
| 7 | Thomas Mardal | Norway | 74.76 m |

Women's 4 × 400 m
| Place | Athlete | Country | Time |
|---|---|---|---|
| 1st place, gold medalist(s) | Carys McAulay; Ama Pipi; Lina Nielsen; Nicole Kendall | Great Britain | 3:28.38 |
| 2nd place, silver medalist(s) | Lakeri Ertzgaard; Josefine Tomine Eriksen; Henriette Jæger; Line Kloster | Norway | 3:29.48 |
| 3rd place, bronze medalist(s) | Milja Thureson; Aino Pulkkinen; Ella Räsänen; Mette Baas | Finland | 3:29.65 |
| 4 | Carmen Avilés; Laura Bueno; Laura Bou; Eva Santidrián | Spain | 3:29.90 |
| 5 | Andrea Bouma; Britt de Blaauw; Myrte van der Schoot; Zoë Sedney | Netherlands | 3:30.53 |
| 6 | Andrea Rooth; Elisabeth Ingvaldsen; Marlén Aakre; Sigrid Kongssund Amlie | Norway | 3:37.29 |
| 7 | Anna Øbakke Lange; Anne Sofie Kirkegaard; Martha Rasmussen; Annemarie Nissen | Denmark | 3:38.41 |

== See also ==
- 2023 Diamond League
