= 2017 Bislett Games =

- Dates: 15 June 2017
- Host city: Oslo, Norway
- Venue: Bislett Stadium
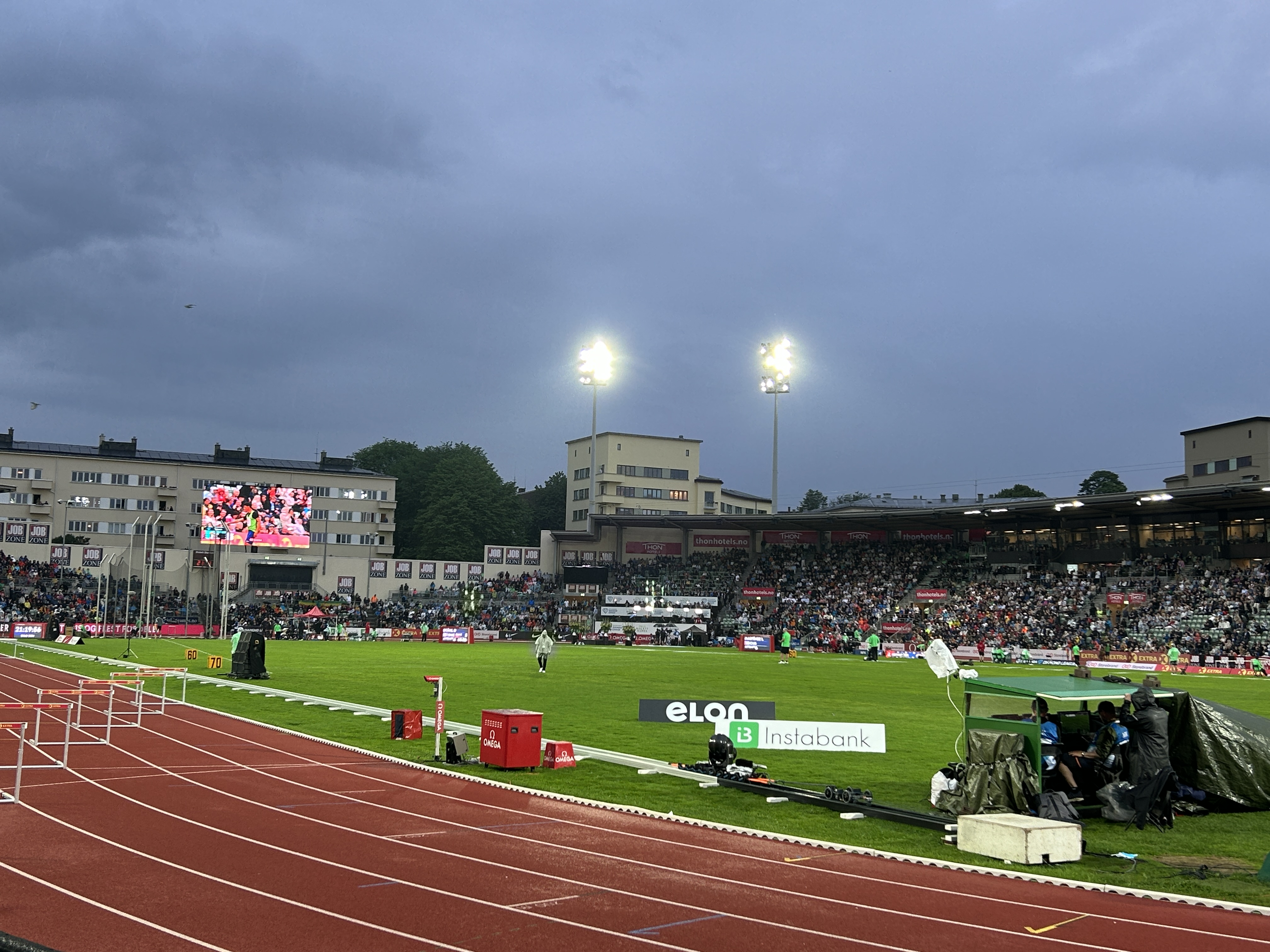
- Level: 2017 Diamond League

The 2017 Bislett Games was the 53rd edition of the annual outdoor track and field meeting in Oslo, Norway. Held on 15 June at Bislett Stadium, it was the fifth leg of the 2017 Diamond League – the highest level international track and field circuit.

== Diamond discipline results ==
In 2017, a completely new system was introduced; the top eight athletes at each meeting were awarded points (8–7–6–5–4–3–2–1), but these points only determined which athletes qualified for the discipline finals in Zürich and Brussels. Athletes no longer became Diamond League champion due to being top of the leaderboard after the final but through winning the disciplines final event during the Diamond League Finals.

=== Men's ===
100 metres
| Rank | Athlete | Nation | Time | Points | Notes |
|---|---|---|---|---|---|
| 1st place, gold medalist(s) | Andre De Grasse | Canada | 10.01 | 8 | SB |
| 2nd place, silver medalist(s) | CJ Ujah | Great Britain | 10.02 | 7 | =SB |
| 3rd place, bronze medalist(s) | Ben Youssef Meïté | Ivory Coast | 10.03 | 6 | SB |
| 4 | Adam Gemili | Great Britain | 10.13 | 5 | |
| 5 | Aaron Brown | Canada | 10.15 | 4 | SB |
| 6 | Churandy Martina | Netherlands | 10.19 | 3 | SB |
| 7 | Reece Prescod | Great Britain | 10.20 | 2 | |
| 8 | Jimmy Vicaut | France | 10.68 | 1 | |
| | | | Wind: (+0.2 m/s) | | |

400 metres
| Rank | Athlete | Nation | Time | Points | Notes |
|---|---|---|---|---|---|
| 1st place, gold medalist(s) | Baboloki Thebe | Botswana | 44.95 | 8 | |
| 2nd place, silver medalist(s) | Matthew Hudson-Smith | Great Britain | 45.16 | 7 | SB |
| 3rd place, bronze medalist(s) | Pavel Maslák | Czech Republic | 45.52 | 6 | |
| 4 | Kevin Borlée | Belgium | 45.53 | 5 | |
| 5 | Rafał Omelko | Poland | 45.83 | 4 | |
| 6 | Pieter Conradie | South Africa | 46.16 | 3 | |
| 7 | Jonathan Borlée | Belgium | 46.18 | 2 | |
| 8 | Mauritz Kåshagen | Norway | 47.16 | 1 | SB |

1500 metres
| Rank | Athlete | Nation | Time | Points | Notes |
|---|---|---|---|---|---|
| 1st place, gold medalist(s) | Jake Wightman | Great Britain | 3:34.17 | 8 | PB |
| 2nd place, silver medalist(s) | Elijah Manangoi | Kenya | 3:34.30 | 7 | |
| 3rd place, bronze medalist(s) | Marcin Lewandowski | Poland | 3:34.60 | 6 | PB |
| 4 | Filip Ingebrigtsen | Norway | 3:36.74 | 5 | SB |
| 5 | David Torrence | Peru | 3:37.19 | 4 | SB |
| 6 | Charlie Grice | Great Britain | 3:37.78 | 3 | |
| 7 | Silas Kiplagat | Kenya | 3:37.81 | 2 | |
| 8 | Jakub Holuša | Czech Republic | 3:38.19 [.182] | 1 | |
| 9 | Fouad Elkaam | Morocco | 3:38.19 [.190] | | |
| 10 | Ayanleh Souleiman | Djibouti | 3:38.55 | | SB |
| 11 | Jordan Williamsz | Australia | 3:38.86 | | |
| 12 | Hillary Ngetich | Kenya | 3:39.41 | | |
| 13 | Ryan Gregson | Australia | 3:41.35 | | |
| 14 | Abdalaati Iguider | Morocco | 3:41.79 | | |
| — | Andrew Kiptoo Rotich | Kenya | DNF | | PM |
| — | Elijah Kipchirchir Kiptoo | Kenya | DNF | | PM |

400 metres hurdles
| Rank | Athlete | Nation | Time | Points | Notes |
|---|---|---|---|---|---|
| 1st place, gold medalist(s) | Karsten Warholm | Norway | 48.25 | 8 | NR |
| 2nd place, silver medalist(s) | Yasmani Copello | Turkey | 48.44 | 7 | SB |
| 3rd place, bronze medalist(s) | Thomas Barr | Ireland | 48.95 | 6 | SB |
| 4 | Mamadou Kassé Hann | France | 48.97 | 5 | |
| 5 | Rasmus Mägi | Estonia | 49.10 | 4 | SB |
| 6 | Kariem Hussein | Switzerland | 49.37 | 3 | |
| 7 | L. J. van Zyl | South Africa | 49.89 | 2 | |
| 8 | Kerron Clement | United States | 50.52 | 1 | |

High jump
| Rank | Athlete | Nation | Height | Points | Notes |
|---|---|---|---|---|---|
| 1st place, gold medalist(s) | Mutaz Barsham | Qatar | 2.38 m | 8 | MR, WL |
| 2nd place, silver medalist(s) | Bohdan Bondarenko | Ukraine | 2.29 m | 7 | SB |
| 3rd place, bronze medalist(s) | Pavel Seliverstau | Belarus | 2.25 m | 6 | |
| 3rd place, bronze medalist(s) | Derek Drouin | Canada | 2.25 m | 6 | |
| 5 | Michael Mason | Canada | 2.25 m | 4 | |
| 6 | Donald Thomas | Bahamas | 2.25 m | 3 | |
| 7 | Robbie Grabarz | Great Britain | 2.25 m | 2 | |
| 8 | Zhang Guowei | China | 2.20 m | 1 | |
| 9 | Majd Eddin Ghazal | Syria | 2.20 m | | |
| 10 | Sylwester Bednarek | Poland | 2.20 m | | |
| — | Andriy Protsenko | Ukraine | NM | | |

Discus throw
| Rank | Athlete | Nation | Distance | Points | Notes |
|---|---|---|---|---|---|
| 1st place, gold medalist(s) | Daniel Ståhl | Sweden | 68.06 m | 8 | |
| 2nd place, silver medalist(s) | Fedrick Dacres | Jamaica | 67.10 m | 7 | |
| 3rd place, bronze medalist(s) | Philip Milanov | Belgium | 66.39 m | 6 | SB |
| 4 | Andrius Gudžius | Lithuania | 65.90 m | 5 | |
| 5 | Robert Harting | Germany | 65.11 m | 4 | SB |
| 6 | Christoph Harting | Germany | 64.13 m | 3 | SB |
| 7 | Piotr Małachowski | Poland | 63.70 m | 2 | |
| 8 | Sven Martin Skagestad | Norway | 63.21 m | 1 | SB |

=== Women's ===
200 metres
| Rank | Athlete | Nation | Time | Points | Notes |
|---|---|---|---|---|---|
| 1st place, gold medalist(s) | Dafne Schippers | Netherlands | 22.31 | 8 | SB |
| 2nd place, silver medalist(s) | Murielle Ahouré-Demps | Ivory Coast | 22.74 | 7 | =SB |
| 3rd place, bronze medalist(s) | Simone Facey | Jamaica | 22.77 | 6 | SB |
| 4 | Gina Lückenkemper | Germany | 23.04 | 5 | |
| 5 | Bianca Williams | Great Britain | 23.38 | 4 | SB |
| 6 | Ella Nelson | Australia | 23.42 | 3 | SB |
| 7 | Nadine Gonska | Germany | 23.48 | 2 | |
| — | Ivet Lalova-Collio | Bulgaria | DQ | | R 163.3a |
| | | | Wind: (+1.4 m/s) | | |

800 metres
| Rank | Athlete | Nation | Time | Points | Notes |
|---|---|---|---|---|---|
| 1st place, gold medalist(s) | Caster Semenya | South Africa | 1:57.59 | 8 | |
| 2nd place, silver medalist(s) | Francine Niyonsaba | Burundi | 1:58.18 | 7 | SB |
| 3rd place, bronze medalist(s) | Margaret Wambui | Kenya | 1:59.17 | 6 | |
| 4 | Lovisa Lindh | Sweden | 1:59.23 | 5 | PB |
| 5 | Melissa Bishop-Nriagu | Canada | 1:59.89 | 4 | |
| 6 | Aníta Hinriksdóttir | Iceland | 2:00.05 | 3 | NR |
| 7 | Rose Mary Almanza | Cuba | 2:00.34 | 2 | |
| 8 | Lynsey Sharp | Great Britain | 2:00.41 | 1 | SB |
| 9 | Hedda Hynne | Norway | 2:01.05 | | SB |
| 10 | Eunice Sum | Kenya | 2:03.04 | | |
| 11 | Renée Eykens | Belgium | 2:03.23 | | |
| — | Sanne Verstegen | Netherlands | DNF | | PM |

100 metres hurdles
| Rank | Athlete | Nation | Time | Points | Notes |
|---|---|---|---|---|---|
| 1st place, gold medalist(s) | Pamela Dutkiewicz | Germany | 12.73 | 8 | |
| 2nd place, silver medalist(s) | Kristi Castlin | United States | 12.75 [.742] | 7 | SB |
| 3rd place, bronze medalist(s) | Isabelle Pedersen | Norway | 12.75 [.748] | 6 | PB |
| 4 | Alina Talay | Belarus | 12.90 | 5 | SB |
| 5 | Tiffany Porter | Great Britain | 12.93 | 4 | |
| 6 | Anne Zagré | Belgium | 12.98 | 3 | |
| 7 | Nadine Hildebrand | Germany | 13.01 | 2 | |
| 8 | Raven Clay | United States | 13.07 | 1 | |
| | | | Wind: (+0.8 m/s) | | |

3000 metres steeplechase
| Rank | Athlete | Nation | Time | Points | Notes |
|---|---|---|---|---|---|
| 1st place, gold medalist(s) | Norah Jeruto | Kenya | 9:17.27 | 8 | |
| 2nd place, silver medalist(s) | Sofia Assefa | Ethiopia | 9:17.34 | 7 | |
| 3rd place, bronze medalist(s) | Fabienne Schlumpf | Switzerland | 9:21.65 | 6 | NR |
| 4 | Purity Cherotich Kirui | Kenya | 9:25.82 | 5 | |
| 5 | Luiza Gega | Albania | 9:26.05 | 4 | NR |
| 6 | Daisy Jepkemei | Kenya | 9:28.88 | 3 | |
| 7 | Joan Kipkemoi | Kenya | 9:31.84 | 2 | PB |
| 8 | Tigest Getent | Bahrain | 9:33.10 | 1 | |
| 9 | Anna Emilie Møller | Denmark | 9:34.30 | | SB |
| 10 | Peruth Chemutai | Uganda | 9:47.90 | | |
| — | Gesa Felicitas Krause | Germany | DNF | | |
| — | Winfred Yavi | Bahrain | DNF | | PM |

Pole vault
| Rank | Athlete | Nation | Height | Points | Notes |
|---|---|---|---|---|---|
| 1st place, gold medalist(s) | Yarisley Silva | Cuba | 4.81 m | 8 | SB |
| 2nd place, silver medalist(s) | Anzhelika Sidorova | Authorised Neutral Athletes | 4.75 m | 7 | SB |
| 3rd place, bronze medalist(s) | Lisa Ryzih | Germany | 4.65 m | 6 | =SB |
| 4 | Angelica Bengtsson | Sweden | 4.55 m | 5 | SB |
| 5 | Alysha Newman | Canada | 4.55 m | 4 | |
| 6 | Mary Saxer | United States | 4.40 m | 3 | |
| — | Nicole Büchler | Switzerland | NM | | |
| — | Eliza McCartney | New Zealand | NM | | |

Long jump
| Rank | Athlete | Nation | Distance | Points | Notes |
|---|---|---|---|---|---|
| 1st place, gold medalist(s) | Tianna Bartoletta | United States | 6.79 m (+0.8 m/s) | 8 | |
| 2nd place, silver medalist(s) | Darya Klishina | Authorised Neutral Athletes | 6.75 m (+2.0 m/s) | 7 | SB |
| 3rd place, bronze medalist(s) | Claudia Salman | Germany | 6.63 m (+0.9 m/s) | 6 | |
| 4 | Shara Proctor | Great Britain | 6.53 m (+1.6 m/s) | 5 | |
| 5 | Melanie Bauschke | Germany | 6.52 m (+1.0 m/s) | 4 | |
| 6 | Lorraine Ugen | Great Britain | 6.50 m (+0.7 m/s) | 3 | |
| 7 | Blessing Okagbare | Nigeria | 6.48 m (+1.1 m/s) | 2 | |
| 8 | Nadia Akpana Assa | Norway | 6.38 m (+0.0 m/s) | 1 | |
| 9 | Khaddi Sagnia | Sweden | 6.26 m (+0.9 m/s) | | SB |
| 10 | Jazmin Sawyers | Great Britain | 6.20 m (+0.1 m/s) | | |

Discus throw
| Rank | Athlete | Nation | Distance | Points | Notes |
|---|---|---|---|---|---|
| 1st place, gold medalist(s) | Sandra Elkasević | Croatia | 66.79 m | 8 | |
| 2nd place, silver medalist(s) | Yaime Pérez | Cuba | 66.24 m | 7 | SB |
| 3rd place, bronze medalist(s) | Denia Caballero | Cuba | 63.29 m | 6 | |
| 4 | Nadine Müller | Germany | 62.90 m | 5 | |
| 5 | Mélina Robert-Michon | France | 59.88 m | 4 | |
| 6 | Julia Harting | Germany | 59.02 m | 3 | |

== National events results ==
=== Men's ===
100 metres
| Rank | Athlete | Nation | Time | Notes |
|---|---|---|---|---|
| 1st place, gold medalist(s) | Jonathan Quarcoo | Norway | 10.21 | |
| 2nd place, silver medalist(s) | Salum Ageze Kashafali | Norway | 10.46 | |
| 3rd place, bronze medalist(s) | Øyvind Strømmen Kjerpeset | Norway | 10.55 | |
| 4 | Jonas Tapani Halonen | Norway | 10.55 | |
| 5 | Michael Rosenberg | Norway | 10.66 | |
| 6 | Stephan Skogheim Kyeremeh | Norway | 10.81 | |
| 7 | Christian Mensah | Norway | 10.83 | |
| 8 | Eirik Thorshaug | Norway | 10.87 | |
| | | | Wind: (+2.2 m/s) | |

200 metres
| Rank | Athlete | Nation | Time | Notes |
|---|---|---|---|---|
| 1st place, gold medalist(s) | Øyvind Strømmen Kjerpeset | Norway | 21.29 | SB |
| 2nd place, silver medalist(s) | Mathias Hove Johansen | Norway | 21.32 | |
| 3rd place, bronze medalist(s) | Kjell Håkon Morken | Norway | 21.51 | |
| 4 | Mike Lubsen | Norway | 21.57 | |
| 5 | Stephan Skogheim Kyeremeh | Norway | 21.59 | SB |
| 6 | Andreas Haara Bakketun | Norway | 21.77 | |
| 7 | Carl Emil Kåshagen | Norway | 21.78 | |
| 8 | Even Meinseth | Norway | 21.81 | |
| | | | Wind: (+1.9 m/s) | |

400 metres
| Rank | Athlete | Nation | Time | Notes |
|---|---|---|---|---|
| 1st place, gold medalist(s) | Joachim Sandberg | Norway | 47.04 | PB |
| 2nd place, silver medalist(s) | Josh-Kevin Ramirez Talm | Norway | 48.40 | |
| 3rd place, bronze medalist(s) | Muhammed Dodou Jatta | Norway | 48.66 | |
| 4 | Kormákur Ari Hafliðason | Iceland | 48.78 | |
| 5 | Toralv Opsal | Norway | 48.93 | |
| 6 | Luca Thompson | Norway | 49.14 | |
| 7 | Torbjörn Fossum Heldal | Norway | 49.53 | |

800 metres
| Rank | Athlete | Nation | Time | Notes |
|---|---|---|---|---|
| 1st place, gold medalist(s) | Rynardt van Rensburg | South Africa | 1:48.98 | |
| 2nd place, silver medalist(s) | Andreas Roth | Norway | 1:49.17 | |
| 3rd place, bronze medalist(s) | Henco Uys | South Africa | 1:49.56 | |
| 4 | Denis Bäuerle | Germany | 1:49.73 | |
| 5 | Thomas M. Heggøy | Norway | 1:50.26 | |
| 6 | Mattias Ohlsson | Sweden | 1:50.55 | |
| 7 | Emil Oustad | Norway | 1:51.13 | |
| 8 | Didrik Hexeberg Warlo | Norway | 1:51.26 | |
| 9 | Mats Hauge | Norway | 1:53.25 | |
| 10 | Ådne Andersen | Norway | 1:53.89 | |
| — | Terje Snarby | Norway | DNF | |
| — | Sondre Dingsør Skogen | Norway | DNF | |

3000 metres
| Rank | Athlete | Nation | Time | Notes |
|---|---|---|---|---|
| 1st place, gold medalist(s) | Per Svela | Norway | 7:54.66 | |
| 2nd place, silver medalist(s) | Marius Vedvik | Norway | 7:58.90 | |
| 3rd place, bronze medalist(s) | Zerei Kbrom Mezngi | Norway | 8:02.07 | |
| 4 | Bjørnar Sandnes Lillefosse | Norway | 8:04.15 | |
| 5 | Ferdinand Kvan Edman | Norway | 8:07.41 | PB |
| 6 | Sigurd Ruud Skjeseth | Norway | 8:13.59 | |
| 7 | Vidar Dahle | Norway | 8:13.75 | PB |
| 8 | Erik Udø Pedersen | Norway | 8:14.49 | |
| 9 | Senay Fissehatsion | Eritrea | 8:16.04 | |
| 10 | Abduljaleel Mohamoud Ismail Hir | Norway | 8:17.90 | |
| 11 | Jens Larsen Åstveit | Norway | 8:23.30 | |
| 12 | Trond Einar Moen Pedersli | Norway | 8:25.92 | |
| 13 | Kristian Tjørnhom | Norway | 8:35.81 | |
| 14 | Emil Danielsson | Sweden | 8:37.67 | |
| — | Even Brøndbo Dahl | Norway | DNF | |

=== Women's ===
100 metres
| Rank | Athlete | Nation | Time | Notes |
|---|---|---|---|---|
| 1st place, gold medalist(s) | Helene Rønningen | Norway | 11.65 | SB |
| 2nd place, silver medalist(s) | Mari Gilde Brubak | Norway | 11.83 | PB |
| 3rd place, bronze medalist(s) | Vilde Gjesbakk | Norway | 12.18 | PB |
| 4 | Emma Fatu Suhonen | Norway | 12.28 | |
| 5 | Tonje Fjellet Kristiansen | Norway | 12.31 | SB |
| 6 | Kristine Berger | Norway | 12.33 | |
| 7 | Liv Storhaug | Norway | 12.37 | |
| 8 | Emilie Sandberg | Norway | 12.59 | SB |
| | | | Wind: (−0.1 m/s) | |

200 metres
| Rank | Athlete | Nation | Time | Notes |
|---|---|---|---|---|
| 1st place, gold medalist(s) | Ingvild Meinseth | Norway | 23.83 | |
| 2nd place, silver medalist(s) | Naomi Van den Broeck | Belgium | 23.87 | |
| 3rd place, bronze medalist(s) | Astrid Mangen Ingebrigtsen | Norway | 23.99 | |
| 4 | Christine Bjelland Jensen | Norway | 24.06 | |
| 5 | Agathe Holtan Wathne | Norway | 24.49 | |
| 6 | Thale Leirfall Bremset | Norway | 24.53 | |
| 7 | Marte Pettersen | Norway | 25.09 | |
| — | Live Haugstad Hilton | Norway | DQ | R 162.7 |
| | | | Wind: (+3.1 m/s) | |

400 metres
| Rank | Athlete | Nation | Time | Notes |
|---|---|---|---|---|
| 1st place, gold medalist(s) | Line Kloster | Norway | 53.65 | |
| 2nd place, silver medalist(s) | Sara Dorthea Jensen | Norway | 54.60 | |
| 3rd place, bronze medalist(s) | Lisa Duffy | Sweden | 55.04 | |
| 4 | Josefine Tomine Eriksen | Norway | 55.75 | |
| 5 | Amanda Frøynes | Norway | 56.57 | PB |
| 6 | Mari Drabløs | Norway | 57.39 | SB |
| 7 | June Sæbøe Tveit | Norway | 57.71 | |

800 metres
| Rank | Athlete | Nation | Time | Notes |
|---|---|---|---|---|
| 1st place, gold medalist(s) | Mina Marie Anglero | Norway | 2:08.46 | |
| 2nd place, silver medalist(s) | Caroline Fleischer | Norway | 2:09.03 | |
| 3rd place, bronze medalist(s) | Amalie Sæten | Norway | 2:09.19 | |
| 4 | Pernille Karlsen Antonsen | Norway | 2:09.74 | |
| 5 | Ingrid Kristiansen | Norway | 2:12.53 | |
| 6 | Andrea Modin Engesæth | Norway | 2:15.40 | |
| 7 | Vilde Våge Henriksen | Norway | 2:16.24 | |
| — | Veronica Undseth | Norway | DNF | |
| — | Agnes Erlingsdottir | Iceland | DNF | |

1500 metres
| Rank | Athlete | Nation | Time | Notes |
|---|---|---|---|---|
| 1st place, gold medalist(s) | Ingrid Folvik | Norway | 4:24.86 | SB |
| 2nd place, silver medalist(s) | Maria Sagnes Wågan | Norway | 4:26.71 | |
| 3rd place, bronze medalist(s) | Camilla Ziesler | Norway | 4:28.20 | |
| 4 | Gaël de Coninck | Sweden | 4:28.26 | |
| 5 | Anniken Johansen | Norway | 4:28.91 | |
| 6 | Christina Maria Toogood | Norway | 4:29.62 | |
| 7 | Kristine Lande Dommersnes | Norway | 4:30.22 | |
| 8 | Sigrid Jervell Våg | Norway | 4:30.54 | |
| 9 | Tessa Frenay | Norway | 4:31.09 | |
| 10 | Vienna Søyland Dahle | Norway | 4:31.95 | |
| 11 | Pernilla Eugenie Epland | Norway | 4:33.64 | |
| 12 | Ingvild Myking | Norway | 4:34.00 | |
| 13 | Marie Synnøve Qvale | Norway | 4:39.18 | |
| 14 | Hannah Engevik | Norway | 4:41.99 | |

400 metres hurdles
| Rank | Athlete | Nation | Time | Notes |
|---|---|---|---|---|
| 1st place, gold medalist(s) | Hanna Palmqvist | Sweden | 58.34 | PB |
| 2nd place, silver medalist(s) | Emily Rose Norum | Norway | 58.76 | SB |
| 3rd place, bronze medalist(s) | Elisabeth Slettum | Norway | 58.91 | PB |
| 4 | Sofia Johnsson | Sweden | 59.07 | SB |
| 5 | Nora Kollerød Wold | Norway | 1:00.02 | PB |
| 6 | Marlén Aakre | Norway | 1:00.22 | SB |
| 7 | Marie Skjæggestad | Norway | 1:00.39 | |
| 8 | Karin Busch | Norway | 1:04.85 | |

== U20 events results ==
=== Men's ===
Mile
| Rank | Athlete | Nation | Time | Notes |
|---|---|---|---|---|
| 1st place, gold medalist(s) | Jakob Ingebrigtsen | Norway | 3:56.29 | PB |
| 2nd place, silver medalist(s) | Hicham Akankam | Morocco | 3:57.66 | |
| 3rd place, bronze medalist(s) | Abdelkarim Ben Zahra | Morocco | 3:58.58 | |
| 4 | Brimin Kiprono Kiprotich | Kenya | 4:00.70 | |
| 5 | Thomas Jefferson Byrkjeland | Norway | 4:00.87 | |
| 6 | Tim Van de Velde | Belgium | 4:05.11 | |
| 7 | Henrik Irgens | Norway | 4:07.25 | |
| 8 | Pieter Sisk | Belgium | 4:08.01 | |
| 9 | Sondre Juven | Norway | 4:08.64 | |
| 10 | Fredrik Sandvik | Norway | 4:13.67 | |
| — | Paul Robinson | Ireland | DNF | PM |
| — | Jack Rayner | Australia | DNF | PM |

== See also ==
- 2017 Diamond League
