= 2011 Bislett Games =

- Dates: 9 June 2011
- Host city: Oslo, Norway
- Venue: Bislett Stadium
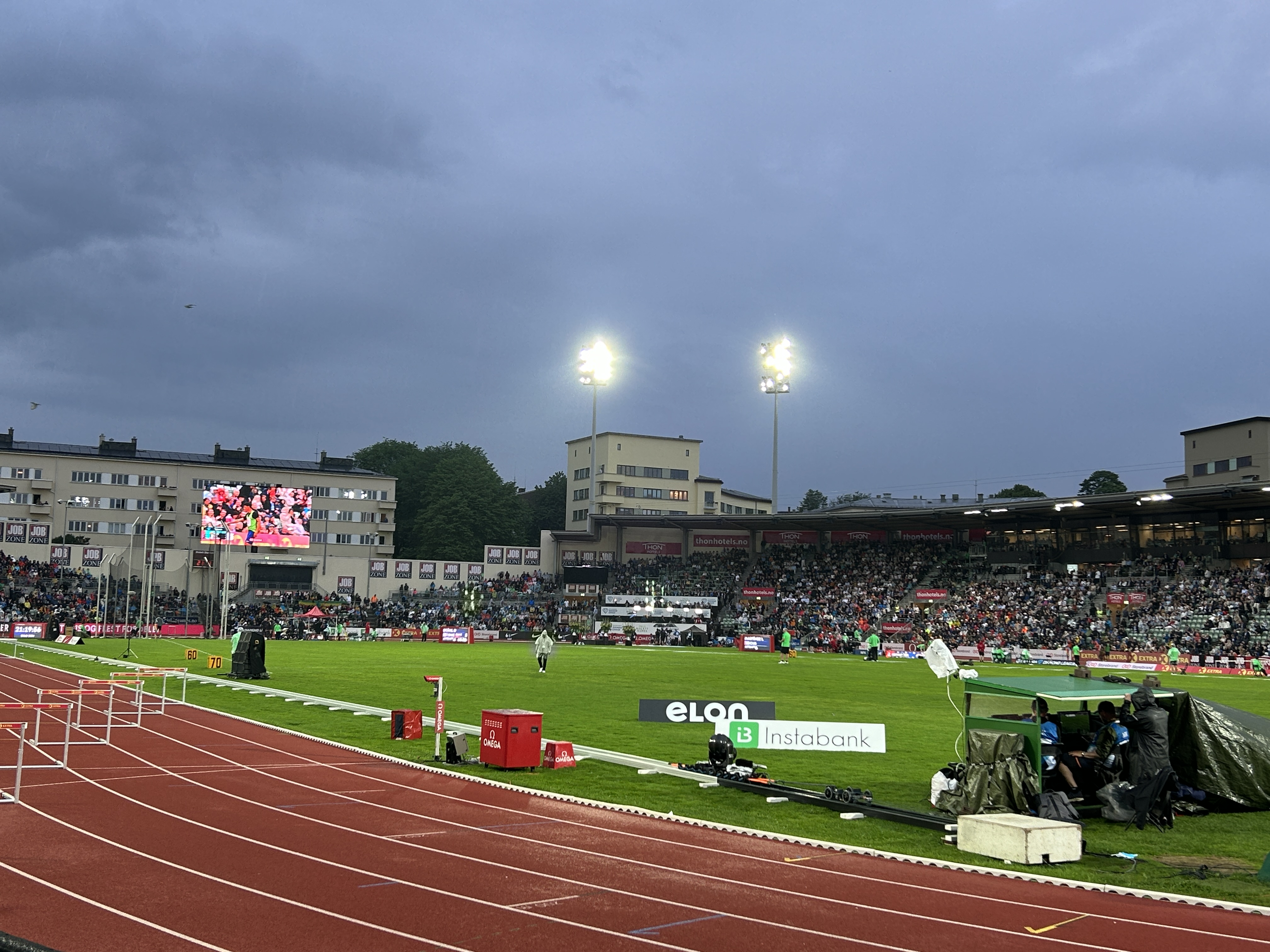
- Level: 2011 Diamond League

The 2011 Bislett Games was the 47th edition of the annual outdoor track and field meeting in Oslo, Norway. Held on 9 June at Bislett Stadium, it was the fourth leg of the 2011 Diamond League – the highest level international track and field circuit.

== Diamond discipline results ==
Podium finishers earned points towards a season leaderboard (4-2-1 respectively), points per event were then doubled in the Diamond League Finals. Athletes had to take part in the Diamond race during the finals to be eligible to win the Diamond trophy which is awarded to the athlete with the most points at the end of the season.

=== Men's ===
200 metres
Rank	Athlete	Nation	Time	Points	Notes
1st place, gold medalist(s)	Usain Bolt	Jamaica	19.86	4	WL
2nd place, silver medalist(s)	Jaysuma Saidy Ndure	Norway	20.43	2	
3rd place, bronze medalist(s)	Mario Forsythe	Jamaica	20.49	1	
4	Kim Collins	Saint Kitts and Nevis	20.56		
5	Christian Malcolm	Great Britain	20.57		SB
6	Sebastian Ernst	Germany	20.70		SB
7	Patrick van Luijk	Netherlands	20.73		
8	Brian Dzingai	Zimbabwe	20.88		
			Wind: (+0.7 m/s)		

Mile
Rank	Athlete	Nation	Time	Points	Notes
1st place, gold medalist(s)	Asbel Kiprop	Kenya	3:49.56	4	
2nd place, silver medalist(s)	Haron Keitany	Kenya	3:49.83	2	
3rd place, bronze medalist(s)	Mekonnen Gebremedhin	Ethiopia	3:50.53	1	
4	Mohammed Shaween	Saudi Arabia	3:50.75		NR
5	Jeff Riseley	Australia	3:52.18		
6	Nixon Chepseba	Kenya	3:53.52		
7	Augustine Kiprono Choge	Kenya	3:54.37		
8	Andy Baddeley	Great Britain	3:54.90		
9	Diego Ruiz	Spain	3:55.50		PB
10	Álvaro Rodríguez	Spain	3:56.71		
11	Henrik Ingebrigtsen	Norway	3:56.75		
—	Silas Kiplagat	Kenya	DNF		
—	Collins Cheboi	Kenya	DNF		PM
—	Vickson Naran Polonet	Kenya	DNF		PM

110 metres hurdles
Rank	Athlete	Nation	Time	Points	Notes
1st place, gold medalist(s)	Aries Merritt	United States	13.12	4	SB
2nd place, silver medalist(s)	Dwight Thomas	Jamaica	13.15	2	NR
3rd place, bronze medalist(s)	Joel Brown	United States	13.20	1	PB
4	Andy Turner	Great Britain	13.32		
5	Tyron Akins	United States	13.34		SB
6	Ryan Wilson	United States	13.36		SB
7	Dominic Berger	United States	13.39		PB
8	Jason Richardson	United States	13.78		
			Wind: (+0.1 m/s)		

3000 metres steeplechase
Rank	Athlete	Nation	Time	Points	Notes
1st place, gold medalist(s)	Paul Kipsiele Koech	Kenya	8:01.83	4	MR, WL
2nd place, silver medalist(s)	Brimin Kipruto	Kenya	8:05.40	2	
3rd place, bronze medalist(s)	Roba Gari	Ethiopia	8:10.41	1	SB
4	Mahiedine Mekhissi-Benabbad	France	8:14.38		
5	Tarık Langat Akdağ	Kenya	8:16.17		
6	Hillary Yego	Kenya	8:20.75		
7	Benjamin Kiplagat	Uganda	8:21.76		
8	Bjørnar Ustad Kristensen	Norway	8:23.19		
9	Antonio Jiménez	Spain	8:26.16		SB
10	Bernard Nganga	Kenya	8:26.29		
11	Silas Kosgei Kitum	Kenya	8:33.56		
12	Tomasz Szymkowiak	Poland	8:37.28		
—	Haron Lagat	Kenya	DNF		PM
—	Abdelhamid Zerrifi	Algeria	DNF		PM

High jump
Rank	Athlete	Nation	Height	Points	Notes
1st place, gold medalist(s)	Kyriakos Ioannou	Cyprus	2.28 m	4	
2nd place, silver medalist(s)	Andrey Silnov	Russia	2.28 m	2	
3rd place, bronze medalist(s)	Raúl Spank	Germany	2.28 m	1	
4	Jaroslav Bába	Czech Republic	2.24 m		
5	Jesse Williams	United States	2.24 m		SB
5	Osku Torro	Finland	2.24 m		
7	Donald Thomas	Bahamas	2.24 m		
8	Aleksandr Shustov	Russia	2.24 m		
9	Yaroslav Rybakov	Russia	2.20 m		
—	Ivan Ukhov	Russia	NM		

Long jump
Rank	Athlete	Nation	Distance	Points	Notes
1st place, gold medalist(s)	Godfrey Khotso Mokoena	South Africa	8.08 m (+1.1 m/s)	4	
2nd place, silver medalist(s)	Morten Jensen	Denmark	8.01 m (+0.9 m/s)	2	SB
3rd place, bronze medalist(s)	Louis Tsatoumas	Greece	7.96 m (+0.0 m/s)	1	
4	Michel Tornéus	Sweden	7.95 m (+1.2 m/s)		
5	Ignisious Gaisah	Ghana	7.93 m (+1.3 m/s)		
6	Greg Rutherford	Great Britain	7.89 m (+0.6 m/s)		
7	Chris Tomlinson	Great Britain	7.87 m (+1.0 m/s)		
8	Fabrice Lapierre	Australia	7.74 m (+1.3 m/s)		
9	Christian Reif	Germany	7.71 m (+1.2 m/s)		
10	Jonas Mögenburg	Norway	7.50 m (+1.1 m/s)		PB

Discus throw
Rank	Athlete	Nation	Distance	Points	Notes
1st place, gold medalist(s)	Gerd Kanter	Estonia	65.14 m	4	
2nd place, silver medalist(s)	Frank Casañas	Spain	64.54 m	2	
3rd place, bronze medalist(s)	Virgilijus Alekna	Lithuania	64.00 m	1	
4	Märt Israel	Estonia	63.30 m		
5	Zoltán Kővágó	Hungary	62.81 m		SB
6	Niklas Arrhenius	Sweden	62.03 m		
7	Erik Cadée	Netherlands	61.84 m		
8	Martin Wierig	Germany	61.16 m		
—	Jason Young	United States	NM		

Javelin throw
Rank	Athlete	Nation	Distance	Points	Notes
1st place, gold medalist(s)	Matthias de Zordo	Germany	83.94 m	4	
2nd place, silver medalist(s)	John Robert Oosthuizen	South Africa	82.07 m	2	
3rd place, bronze medalist(s)	Petr Frydrych	Czech Republic	81.09 m	1	
4	Vadims Vasiļevskis	Latvia	80.50 m		
5	Tero Pitkämäki	Finland	80.22 m		
6	Oleksandr Pyatnytsya	Ukraine	79.55 m		
7	Ari Mannio	Finland	79.51 m		
8	Till Wöschler	Germany	78.72 m		

=== Women's ===
100 metres
Rank	Athlete	Nation	Time	Points	Notes
1st place, gold medalist(s)	Ivet Lalova-Collio	Bulgaria	11.01	4	
2nd place, silver medalist(s)	Olesya Povh	Ukraine	11.14	2	
3rd place, bronze medalist(s)	Ezinne Okparaebo	Norway	11.17	1	
4	Mariya Ryemyen	Ukraine	11.18		
5	Ruddy Zang Milama	Gabon	11.19		
6	Stephanie Durst	United States	11.33		
7	Verena Sailer	Germany	11.46		
—	Georgia Kokloni	Greece	DQ		R 162.7
			Wind: (+2.2 m/s)		

400 metres
Rank	Athlete	Nation	Time	Points	Notes
1st place, gold medalist(s)	Amantle Montsho	Botswana	50.10	4	SB
2nd place, silver medalist(s)	Denisa Helceletová	Czech Republic	51.04	2	
3rd place, bronze medalist(s)	Novlene Williams-Mills	Jamaica	51.17	1	
4	Ksenia Zadorina	Russia	51.26		SB
5	Antonina Krivoshapka	Russia	51.36		
~~6~~	~~Tatyana Firova~~	~~Russia~~	~~52.28~~		DQ (Note: Due to doping violations Firova's results between 20 August 2008 and 31 December 2012 were disqualified.)
7	Janin Lindenberg	Germany	52.82		
8	Anna Yaroshchuk	Ukraine	53.31		

800 Metres
Rank	Athlete	Nation	Time	Points	Notes
1st place, gold medalist(s)	Halima Hachlaf	Morocco	1:58.27	4	WL
2nd place, silver medalist(s)	~~Mariya Savinova~~	~~Russia~~	~~1:58.44~~	2	DQ (Note: Due to doping violations Savinova's, Rusanova's and Klyuka's results during this competition were disqualified.), ~~SB~~
3rd place, bronze medalist(s)	Caster Semenya	South Africa	1:58.61	1	SB
4	Janeth Jepkosgei	Kenya	1:59.05		SB
5	Jenny Meadows	Great Britain	1:59.27		SB
~~6~~	~~Yuliya Rusanova~~	~~Russia~~	~~1:59.65~~		DQ
7	Lucia Hrivnák Klocová	Slovakia	1:59.92		SB
~~8~~	~~Svetlana Klyuka~~	~~Russia~~	~~1:59.97~~		DQ
9	Yvonne Hak	Netherlands	2:00.30		SB
10	Ingvill Måkestad Bovim	Norway	2:01.16		
11	Yekaterina Kostetskaya	Russia	2:05.06		
—	Karen Shinkins	Ireland	DNF		PM

5000 metres
Rank	Athlete	Nation	Time	Notes
1st place, gold medalist(s)	Meseret Defar	Ethiopia	14:37.32	SB
2nd place, silver medalist(s)	Sentayehu Ejigu	Ethiopia	14:37.50	
3rd place, bronze medalist(s)	Genzebe Dibaba	Ethiopia	14:37.56	PB
4	Meselech Melkamu	Ethiopia	14:39.44	SB
5	Emebet Anteneh	Ethiopia	14:43.29	PB
6	Priscah Jepleting Cherono	Kenya	14:43.30	
7	Dolores Checa	Spain	14:46.30	PB
8	Hiwot Ayalew	Ethiopia	14:49.36	
9	Pauline Korikwiang	Kenya	14:54.36	
10	Sara Moreira	Portugal	15:11.97	
11	Wude Ayalew	Ethiopia	15:12.52	
12	Genet Yalew	Ethiopia	15:16.13	SB
~~13~~	~~Alemitu Bekele Degfa~~	~~Turkey~~	~~15:22.96~~	DQ (Note: Due to doping violations Degfa's results between 17 August 2009 and 16 January 2013 were disqualified.)
14	Purity Rionoripo	Kenya	15:25.55	PB
—	Sule Utura	Ethiopia	DNF	
—	Tamara Tverdostup	Ukraine	DNF	PM

400 metres hurdles
Rank	Athlete	Nation	Time	Points	Notes
1st place, gold medalist(s)	Zuzana Hejnová	Czech Republic	54.38	4	
2nd place, silver medalist(s)	Perri Shakes-Drayton	United Kingdom	54.77	2	SB
3rd place, bronze medalist(s)	Natalya Antyukh	Russia	55.45	1	
4	Queen Claye	United States	55.87		
5	Nickiesha Wilson	Jamaica	56.01		
6	Nicole Leach	United States	56.08		=SB
7	Christine Spence	United States	56.12		
8	Josanne Lucas	Trinidad and Tobago	57.08		SB

Pole vault
Rank	Athlete	Nation	Height	Points	Notes
1st place, gold medalist(s)	Fabiana Murer	Brazil	4.60 m	4	
2nd place, silver medalist(s)	Aleksandra Kiryashova	Russia	4.50 m	2	=SB
3rd place, bronze medalist(s)	Anna Rogowska	Poland	4.40 m	1	
4	Monika Pyrek	Poland	4.30 m		SB
—	Carolin Hingst	Germany	NM		
—	Cathrine Larsåsen	Norway	NM		
—	Minna Nikkanen	Finland	NM		

Triple jump
Rank	Athlete	Nation	Distance	Points	Notes
1st place, gold medalist(s)	Yargelis Savigne	Cuba	14.81 m (+1.4 m/s)	4	
2nd place, silver medalist(s)	Olha Saladukha	Ukraine	14.71 m (+0.3 m/s)	2	
3rd place, bronze medalist(s)	Mabel Gay	Cuba	14.31 m (+0.2 m/s)	1	
4	Katja Demut	Germany	14.17 m (−0.1 m/s)		SB
5	Olga Rypakova	Kazakhstan	14.04 m (+1.0 m/s)		
6	Anna Pyatykh	Russia	13.93 m (+0.8 m/s)		
7	Nadezhda Alekhina	Russia	13.93 m (+0.1 m/s)		
8	Khaddi Sagnia	Sweden	12.84 m (+0.4 m/s)		SB

Shot put
Rank	Athlete	Nation	Distance	Points	Notes
1st place, gold medalist(s)	Valerie Adams	New Zealand	20.26 m	4	MR
2nd place, silver medalist(s)	~~Nadzeya Astapchuk~~	~~Belarus~~	~~19.92 m~~	2	DQ (Note: Due to doping violations Astapchuk's results during this competition were disqualified.)
3rd place, bronze medalist(s)	Gong Lijiao	China	19.57 m	1	
4	Jillian Camarena-Williams	United States	19.14 m		
5	Nadine Kleinert	Germany	18.50 m		
~~6~~	Liu Xiangrong	China	18.08 m		
7	Helena Engman	Sweden	16.91 m		
8	Kristin Sundsteigen	Norway	13.97 m		

== Promotional events results ==
=== Men's ===
1500 metres
Rank	Athlete	Nation	Time	Notes
1st place, gold medalist(s)	Nicholas Kiptanui Kemboi	Kenya	3:37.25	
2nd place, silver medalist(s)	Hillary Maiyo	Kenya	3:37.27	
3rd place, bronze medalist(s)	Imad Touil	Algeria	3:37.47	
4	Jack Bolas	United States	3:38.39	
5	Stefan Eberhardt	Germany	3:39.09	
6	Hamza Driouch	Qatar	3:39.53	
7	Morten Munkholm	Denmark	3:39.73	
8	Fekadu Dejene	Ethiopia	3:40.60	
9	Jakub Holuša	Czech Republic	3:40.92	
10	Thomas Solberg Eide	Norway	3:41.75	
11	Colin McCourt	Great Britain	3:42.09	
12	Sindre Buraas	Norway	3:42.20	
13	Hans Kristian Fløystad	Norway	3:43.16	
14	Morten Velde	Norway	3:43.18	
15	Håkon Brox	Norway	3:44.43	
16	Craig Miller	United States	3:44.96	
17	Peter van der Westhuizen	South Africa	3:49.42	
—	Geoffrey Rono	Kenya	DNF	PM

=== Women's ===
100 metres hurdles - Heats
Heat 1
Rank	Athlete	Nation	Time	Notes
1	Christina Vukicevic	Norway	12.97	Q
2	Nichole Denby	United States	13.04	Q
3	Gemma Bennett	Great Britain	13.41	Q
4	Aleksandra Antonova	Russia	13.54	Q
5	Marie Hagle	Norway	13.92	
6	Tale Ørving	Norway	13.95	
7	Lene Secher Myrmel	Norway	14.47	
			Wind: (+0.4 m/s)	
Heat 2
1	Kristi Castlin	United States	12.99	Q
2	Vonette Dixon	Jamaica	13.20	Q
3	Yevgeniya Snihur	Ukraine	13.60	Q
4	Tine Teigene Dalen	Norway	14.12	Q, SB
5	Kine Aaltvedt	Norway	14.39	
—	Angela Whyte	Canada	DQ	R 162.7
			Wind: (−0.7 m/s)	

100 metres hurdles - Final
Rank	Athlete	Nation	Time	Notes
1st place, gold medalist(s)	Christina Vukicevic	Norway	12.79	SB
2nd place, silver medalist(s)	Kristi Castlin	United States	12.95	SB
3rd place, bronze medalist(s)	Nichole Denby	United States	13.06	
4	Vonette Dixon	Jamaica	13.07	
5	Yevgeniya Snihur	Ukraine	13.36	SB
6	Gemma Bennett	Great Britain	13.39	
7	Aleksandra Antonova	Russia	13.42	
8	Tine Teigene Dalen	Norway	14.29	SB
			Wind: (+1.0 m/s)	

== National events results ==
=== Men's ===
200 metres
Rank	Athlete	Nation	Time	Notes
1st place, gold medalist(s)	Thomas Wiborg	Norway	21.54	
2nd place, silver medalist(s)	Tormod Hjortnæs Larsen	Norway	21.57	
3rd place, bronze medalist(s)	Philip Bjørnå Berntsen	Norway	21.58	
4	Per Magnus Arjun Solli	Norway	21.64	
5	Einar-André Bydal Jakobsen	Norway	21.70	
6	Eirik Tanberg	Norway	21.77	PB
7	Carl Emil Kåshagen	Norway	22.05	
8	Alexander Dahlstrøm Winger	Norway	22.20	
			Wind: (+1.1 m/s)	

800 metres
Rank	Athlete	Nation	Time	Notes
1st place, gold medalist(s)	Johan Rogestedt	Sweden	1:48.60	PB
2nd place, silver medalist(s)	Håkon Mushom	Norway	1:48.69	
3rd place, bronze medalist(s)	Thomas Roth	Norway	1:49.30	SB
4	Stian Flo	Norway	1:49.63	
5	Torje Klevmo	Norway	1:51.39	SB
6	Filip Ingebrigtsen	Norway	1:51.58	
7	Emil Oustad	Norway	1:51.70	
8	Terje Snarby	Norway	1:51.72	
9	Vidar Dahle	Norway	1:52.21	
10	Roald Frøskeland	Norway	1:53.20	
11	Christian Norbye	Norway	1:54.87	
—	Petter Gire Døhlie	Norway	DNF	

=== Women's ===
400 metres
Rank	Athlete	Nation	Time	Notes
1st place, gold medalist(s)	Line Kloster	Norway	53.38	PB
2nd place, silver medalist(s)	Tara Marie Norum	Norway	54.94	
3rd place, bronze medalist(s)	Benedicte Hauge	Norway	55.03	
4	Rebecca Högberg	Sweden	55.28	
5	Vilde Svortevik	Norway	55.89	
6	Anne Skudal Dolvik	Norway	56.14	
7	Randi Kjerstad	Norway	56.48	
8	Julie Bertheussen Falkanger	Norway	56.96	

1500 metres
Rank	Athlete	Nation	Time	Notes
1st place, gold medalist(s)	Viktoria Tegenfeldt	Sweden	4:16.99	
2nd place, silver medalist(s)	Sofia Öberg	Sweden	4:19.03	PB
3rd place, bronze medalist(s)	Karoline Bjerkeli Grøvdal	Norway	4:20.77	
4	Meraf Bahta	Eritrea	4:23.05	
5	Mary Alenbratt	Sweden	4:23.11	PB
6	Linn Nilsson	Sweden	4:25.35	
7	Frida Berge	Norway	4:25.85	
8	Silje Fjørtoft	Norway	4:26.70	
9	Nathalie Rohlén	Sweden	4:28.89	
10	Thea Krokan Murud	Norway	4:30.31	
11	Ingeborg Kristine Lind	Norway	4:30.52	
12	Ida Elise Nymoen Eltervaag	Norway	4:49.79	
—	Ida Vabø	Norway	DNF	
—	Lisbeth Pedersen	Norway	DNF	
—	Christina Maria Toogood	Norway	DNF	

== See also ==
- 2011 Diamond League
