= Bislett Games =

Athletics tournament held in Norway

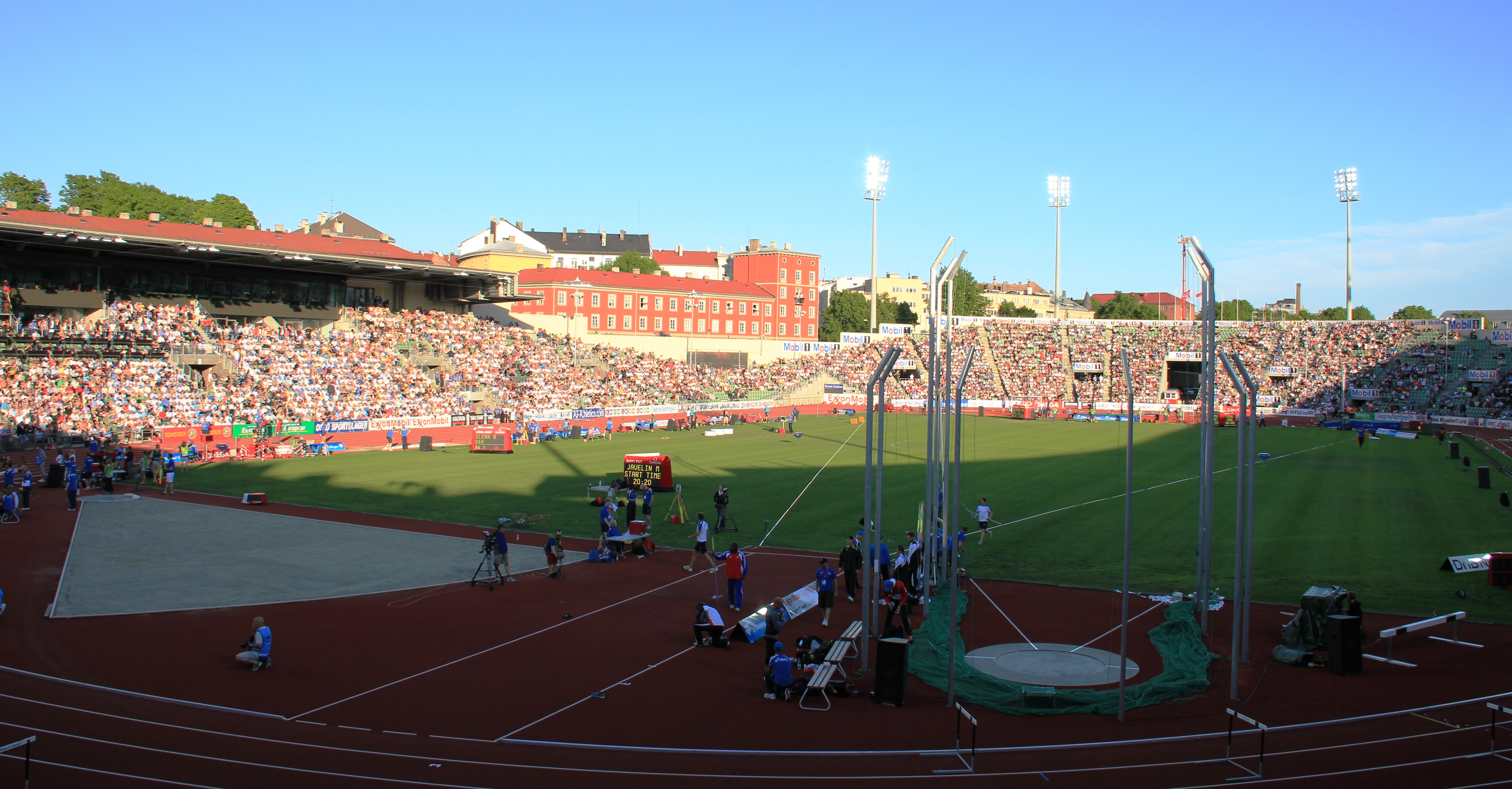
- The Bislett Games 4 June 2010
- Date: June – July
- Location: Oslo, Norway
- World Athletics Cat.: GW
- Established: 14 July 1965
- Website: Oslo Diamond League
- 2026 Bislett Games

The Bislett Games is an annual track and field meeting at the Bislett Stadium in Oslo, Norway. Previously one of the IAAF Golden League events, it is now part of the Diamond League.

== History ==
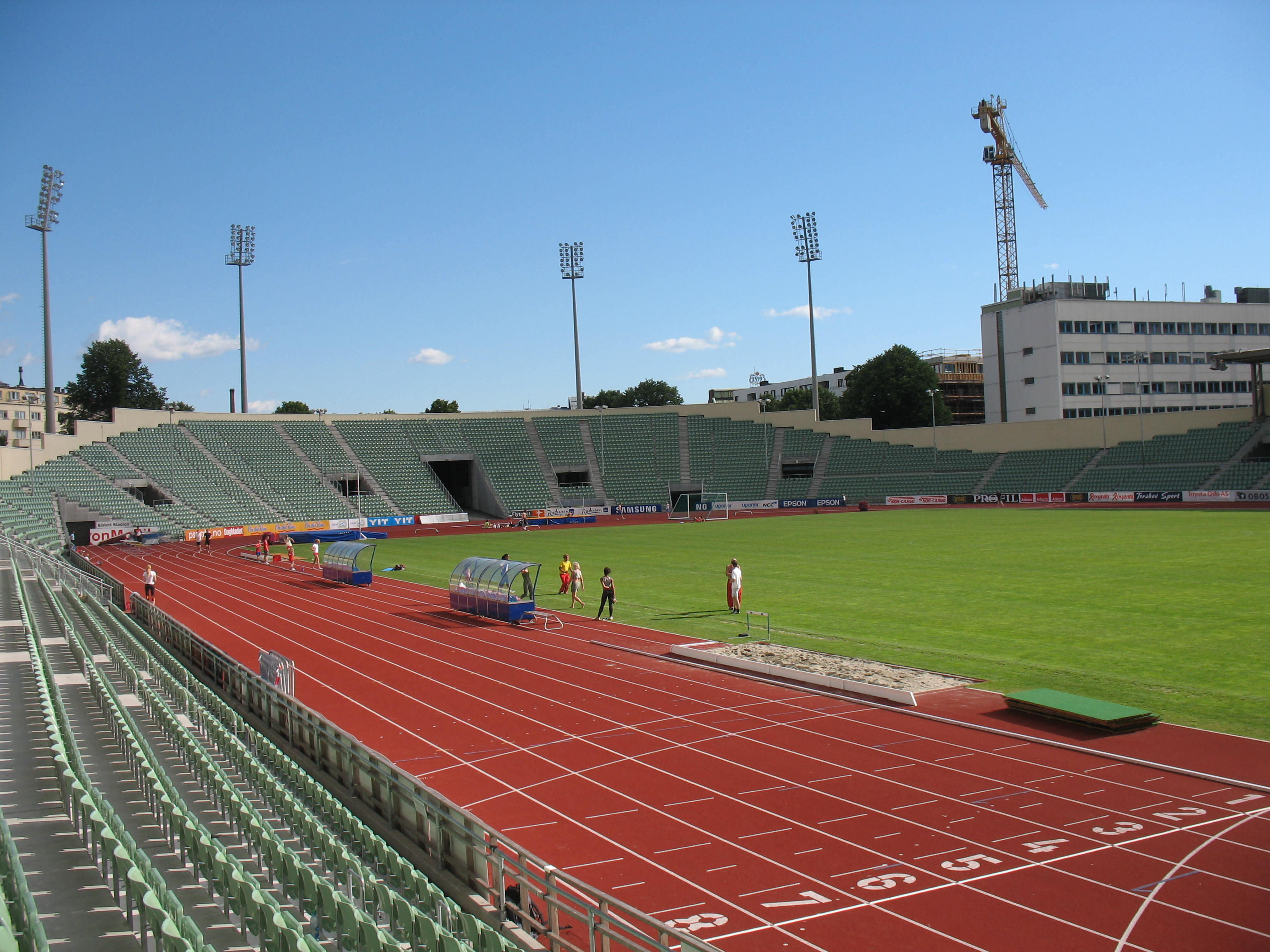
The Bislett Games are held at Bislett Stadium. Photo: Kjetil Ree

The first international athletics meeting at Bislett was held in 1924. Until 1937 the competitions are known as "The American Meetings", similar to the international meetings in Zürich. Different organizers staged the meetings between 1947 and 1965 until the three athletics associations BUL, Vidar and Tjalve formed the Bislett Alliance. At this year Arne Haukvik founded the Bislett Games. He was a former politician and director of the meeting, who used to invite the athletes, sponsors and the press to his home for his traditional "strawberry party" the day before the event each year. He died of cancer in 2002 at age 76. The tradition however is continued.

Bislett Stadium was used for speed skating events at the Olympics, but nowadays it is better known for its Bislett Games athletics meeting. Bislett Games attract the best track and field athletes from all over the world, and 65 world records have been set on its forgiving, brick-coloured track so far. Due to the building of the new Bislett Stadium in Oslo, which started in April 2004, the 2004 edition of the traditional athletics meeting was staged on Fana stadion in Bergen under the name Bergen Bislett Games.

In 2009, a severe storm delayed proceedings and even caused damage to the track-side clock display. Sanya Richards recorded the fastest women's 400 metres time since 2006 while the Dream Mile brought a number of records with winner Deresse Mekonnen improving upon his Ethiopian record, Kenyan William Biwott Tanui setting a world junior record and third-placed Augustine Choge beating his personal best. Former javelin winners Andreas Thorkildsen and Tero Pitkämäki continued their five-year shared dominance of the Bislett Games, with Pitkämäki taking the victory this time.

=== Alternative events ===
During 2020 the COVID-19 pandemic prevented Bislett Games from taking place, instead an event called Impossible Games was held. In 2021 there were still restrictions which caused the main event to be postponed to July 1. A restricted event called Night of Highlights was additionally held on June 4, 2021.

== Editions ==
During some of the earliest editions, there were two meetings held per year.

Bislett Games editions
Ed.	Meeting	Series	Date	Ref.
1st	1965 Bislett Games		14 Jul 1965	
2nd	1966 Bislett Games		1966	
3rd	1967 Bislett Games		1967	
4th	1968 Bislett Games		1968	
5th	1969 Bislett Games		1969	
6th	1970 Bislett Games		1970	
7th	1971 Bislett Games		1971	
8th	1972 Bislett Games		3-4 Aug 1972	
9th	1973 Bislett Games		24 Jul 1973	
10th	1974 Bislett Games		30–31 Jul 1974	
11th	1975 Bislett Games		3 Jul 1975	
12th	1976 Bislett Games		30 Jun 1976	
13th	1977 Bislett Games		28 Jun 1977	
14th	1978 Bislett Games		27 Jun 1978	
15th	1979 Bislett Games		5 Jul, 17 Jul 1979	
16th	1980 Bislett Games		1 Jul 1980	
17th	1981 Bislett Games		26 Jun 1981 (Note: There was a separate "Oslo Games" meeting on 11 July 1981 that was sometimes called the Bislett Games.)	
18th	1982 Bislett Games		26 Jun 1982	
19th	1983 Bislett Games		22–23 Aug 1983	
20th	1984 Bislett Games		28 Jun 1984	
21st	1985 Bislett Games	1985 IAAF Grand Prix	16 Jul, 27 Jul 1985	
22nd	1986 Bislett Games	1986 IAAF Grand Prix	5 Jul 1986	
23rd	1987 Bislett Games	1987 IAAF Grand Prix	4 Jul 1987	
24th	1988 Bislett Games	1988 IAAF Grand Prix	2 Jul 1988	
25th	1989 Bislett Games	1989 IAAF Grand Prix	1 Jul 1989	
26th	1990 Bislett Games	1990 IAAF Grand Prix	14 Jul 1990	
27th	1991 Bislett Games	1991 IAAF Grand Prix	6 Jul 1991	
28th	1992 Bislett Games	1992 IAAF Grand Prix	4 Jul 1992	
29th	1993 Bislett Games	1993 IAAF Grand Prix	10 Jul 1993	
30th	1994 Bislett Games	1994 IAAF Grand Prix	22 Jul 1994	
31st	1995 Bislett Games	1995 IAAF Grand Prix	21 Jul 1995	
32nd	1996 Bislett Games	1996 IAAF Grand Prix	5 Jul 1996	
33rd	1997 Bislett Games	1997 IAAF Grand Prix	4 Jul 1997	
34th	1998 Bislett Games	1998 IAAF Golden League	9 Jul 1998	
35th	1999 Bislett Games	1999 IAAF Golden League	30 Jun 1999	
36th	2000 Bislett Games	2000 IAAF Golden League	28 Jul 2000	
37th	2001 Bislett Games	2001 IAAF Golden League	13 Jul 2001	
38th	2002 Bislett Games	2002 IAAF Golden League	28 Jun 2002	
39th	2003 Bislett Games	2003 IAAF Golden League	27 Jun 2003	
40th	2004 Bislett Games	2004 IAAF Golden League	11 Jun 2004	
41st	2005 Bislett Games	2005 IAAF Golden League	29 Jul 2005	
42nd	2006 Bislett Games	2006 IAAF Golden League	2 Jun 2006	
43rd	2007 Bislett Games	2007 IAAF Golden League	15 Jun 2007	
44th	2008 Bislett Games	2008 IAAF Golden League	6 Jun 2008	
45th	2009 Bislett Games	2009 IAAF Golden League	3 Jul 2009	
46th	2010 Bislett Games	2010 Diamond League	4 Jun 2010	
47th	2011 Bislett Games	2011 Diamond League	9 Jun 2011	
48th	2012 Bislett Games	2012 Diamond League	7 Jun 2012	
49th	2013 Bislett Games	2013 Diamond League	13 Jun 2013	
50th	2014 Bislett Games	2014 Diamond League	11 Jun 2014	
51st	2015 Bislett Games	2015 Diamond League	11 Jun 2015	
52nd	2016 Bislett Games	2016 Diamond League	9 Jun 2016	
53rd	2017 Bislett Games	2017 Diamond League	15 Jun 2017	
54th	2018 Bislett Games	2018 Diamond League	7 Jun 2018	
55th	2019 Bislett Games	2019 Diamond League	13 Jun 2019	
	2020 Impossible Games	2020 Diamond League	11 Jun 2020	
56th	2021 Bislett Games	2021 Diamond League	1 Jul 2021	
57th	2022 Bislett Games	2022 Diamond League	16 Jun 2022	
58th	2023 Bislett Games	2023 Diamond League	15 Jun 2023	
59th	2024 Bislett Games	2024 Diamond League	30 May 2024	
60th	2025 Bislett Games	2025 Diamond League	12 Jun 2025	
61st	2026 Bislett Games	2026 Diamond League	10 Jun 2026	

== World records ==
Over the course of its history, numerous world records have been set at the Games and former athletics meetings at Bislett stadium. In 1985 three new records were set at the same evening.

=== Bislett Games ===
World records set at the Bislett Games
Year	Event	Record	Athlete	Nationality
1965	10,000 m	27:39.4 h	Ron Clarke	Australia
1974	1000 m	2:13.9 h	Rick Wohlhuter	United States
1975	3000 m	8:46.6 h	Grete Waitz	Norway
1975	3000 m steeplechase	8:10.4 h	Anders Gärderud	Sweden
1976	3000 m	8:45.4 h	Grete Waitz	Norway
1979	800 m	1:42.33	Sebastian Coe	Great Britain
1980	Mile	3:48.8 h	Steve Ovett	United Kingdom
1981	1000 m	2:12.18	Sebastian Coe	Great Britain
1982	5000 m	13:00.41	David Moorcroft	Great Britain
1984	5000 m	14:58.89	Ingrid Kristiansen	Norway
1985	10,000 m	30:59.42	Ingrid Kristiansen	Norway
1985	5000 m	13:00.40	Saïd Aouita	Morocco
1985	Mile	3:46.32	Steve Cram	United Kingdom
1986	10,000 m	30:13.74	Ingrid Kristiansen	Norway
1993	10,000 m	26:58.38	Yobes Ondieki	Kenya
1994	10,000 m	26:52.23	William Sigei	Kenya
1994	20,000 m walk	2:04:55	Bernardo Segura	Mexico
1997	10,000 m	26:31.32	Haile Gebrselassie	Ethiopia
2000	Javelin throw	69.48 m	Trine Hattestad	Norway
2004	5000 m	14:24.68	Elvan Abeylegesse	Turkey
2004	5000 m	14:30.88 WJR	Tirunesh Dibaba	Ethiopia
2007	5000 m	14:16.63	Meseret Defar	Ethiopia
2008	5000 m	14:11.15	Tirunesh Dibaba	Ethiopia
2008	800 m	1:42.69 WJR	Abubaker Kaki	Sudan
2021	400 m hurdles	46.70	Karsten Warholm	Norway
2023	Mile	4:17.13 WJR	Birke Haylom	Ethiopia

=== Differently named meetings ===
World records set at differently named meetings
Year	Event	Record	Athlete	Nationality
1952	Hammer throw	61.25 m	Sverre Strandli	Norway
1953	Hammer throw	62.36 m	Sverre Strandli	Norway
1955	1500 m	3:40.8 h	László Tábori; Gunnar Nielsen	Hungary; Denmark
1955	3000 m steeplechase	8:45.4 h	Pentti Karvonen	Finland
1964	Javelin throw	87.12 m & 91.72 m	Terje Pedersen	Norway

=== American meetings ===
World records set at the American meetings
Year	Event	Record	Athlete	Nationality
1924	500 m	63.8 h	Adriaan Paulen	Netherlands
1925	Pole vault	4.23 m	Charles Hoff	Norway
1934	110 m hurdles	14.2 h	Percy Beard	Canada
1934	Shot put	17.40 m	Jack Torrance	United States
1934	Discus throw	52.42 m	Harald Andersson	Sweden
1935	110 m hurdles	14.2 h	Alvin Moreau	United States
1936	110 m hurdles	13.7 h	Forrest Towns	United States

== Meeting records ==
=== Men ===
Men's meeting records of the Bislett Games
Event	Record	Athlete	Nationality	Date	Meet	Ref.
100 m	9.79 (+0.6 m/s)	Usain Bolt	Jamaica	7 June 2012	2012	
200 m	19.77 (+0.6 m/s)	Erriyon Knighton	United States	15 June 2023	2023	
400 m	43.86	Michael Johnson	United States	21 July 1995	1995	
800 m	1:42.04	David Rudisha	Kenya	4 June 2010	2010	
1000 m	2:12.18	Sebastian Coe	Great Britain	11 July 1981	1981	
1500 m	3:27.95	Jakob Ingebrigtsen	Norway	15 June 2023	2023	
Mile	3:44.90	Hicham El Guerrouj	Morocco	4 July 1997	1997	
2000 m	4:50.01	Jakob Ingebrigtsen	Norway	11 June 2020	2020	
3000 m	7:26.25	Yomif Kejelcha	Ethiopia	1 July 2021	2021	
Two miles	8:15.2 h	Rod Dixon	New Zealand	17 July 1979	1979	
5000 m	12:36.73	Hagos Gebrhiwet	Ethiopia	30 May 2024	2024	
6 miles	26:47.0 h	Ron Clarke	Australia	14 July 1965	1965	
10,000 m	26:31.32	Haile Gebrselassie	Ethiopia	4 July 1997	1997	
20,000 m	57:55.0+ h	Sondre Nordstad Moen	Norway	11 June 2020	2020	
25,000 m (track)	1:12:46.5 h	Sondre Nordstad Moen	Norway	11 June 2020	2020	
One hour	20,703 m	Sondre Nordstad Moen	Norway	11 June 2020	2020	
110 m hurdles	13.00 (−0.1 m/s)	Ladji Doucouré	France	29 July 2005	2005	
300 m hurdles	32.67 WBP, DLR	Karsten Warholm	Norway	12 June 2025	2025	
400 m hurdles	46.52	Karsten Warholm	Norway	15 June 2023	2023	
2000 m steeplechase	5:20.00	Krzysztof Wesołowski	Poland	28 June 1984	1984	
3000 m steeplechase	8:01.83	Paul Kipsiele Koech	Kenya	9 June 2011	2011	
High jump	2.38 m	Mutaz Essa Barshim	Qatar	15 June 2017	2017	
Pole vault	6.15 m	Armand Duplantis	Sweden	12 June 2025	2025	
Long jump	8.53 m (+0.9 m/s)	Irving Saladino	Panama	2 June 2006	2006	
Triple jump	18.01 m (+0.4 m/s)	Jonathan Edwards	Great Britain	9 July 1998	1998	
Shot put	22.29 m	Tomas Walsh	New Zealand	7 June 2018	2018	
Discus throw	70.91 m	Mykolas Alekna	Lithuania	30 May 2024	2024	
Hammer throw	81.92 m DLR	Wojciech Nowicki	Poland	15 June 2023	2023	
Javelin throw	94.22 m (old design)	Michael Wessing	West Germany	3 August 1978	1978	
Javelin throw	92.60 m (current design)	Raymond Hecht	Germany	21 July 1995	1995	
5000 m walk	20:27.0+ h	Erling Andersen	Norway	3 August 1979	1979	
10,000 m walk	40:50.0 h	Erling Andersen	Norway	3 August 1979	1979	
20,000 m walk	1:27:56.8 h	Erling Andersen	Norway	23 August 1981	1981	
30,000 m walk	2:35:45.6 h	Tore Brustad	Norway	20 July 1970	1970	
50,000 m walk	4:42:10.0 h	Per Ola Sverre	Norway	9 August 1974	1974	
4 × 100 m relay	40.31	Elvis Afrifa; Taymir Burnet; Solomon Bockarie; Raphael Bouju	Netherlands	16 June 2022	2022	
4 × 1500 m relay	14:40.4 h	Tony Polhill 3:42.9; John Walker 3:40.4; Rod Dixon 3:41.2; Dick Quax 3:35.9	New Zealand	22 August 1973	1973	

=== Women ===
Women's meeting records of the Bislett Games
Event	Record	Athlete	Nationality	Date	Meet	Ref.
100 m	10.75 (+0.9 m/s)	Marie-Josée Ta Lou	Ivory Coast	15 June 2023	2023	
200 m	21.93 (+0.7 m/s)	Dafne Schippers	Netherlands	9 June 2016	2016	
400 m	49.23	Taťána Kocembová	Czechoslovakia	23 August 1983	1983	
600 m	1:29.06	Hedda Hynne	Norway	11 June 2020	2020	
800 m	1:55.04	Jarmila Kratochvílová	Czechoslovakia	23 August 1983	1983	
1500 m	3:57.40	Suzy Favor-Hamilton	United States	28 July 2000	2000	
Mile	4:17.13	Birke Haylom	Ethiopia	15 June 2023	2023	
3000 m	8:24.20	Georgia Griffith	Australia	30 May 2024	2024	
5000 m	14:11.15	Tirunesh Dibaba	Ethiopia	6 June 2008	2008	
10,000 m	30:13.74	Ingrid Kristiansen	Norway	5 July 1986	1986	
100 m hurdles	12.49 (+0.7 m/s)	Sally Pearson	Australia	7 June 2012	2012	
200 m hurdles	26.11 (−0.9 m/s)	Line Kloster	Norway	11 June 2020	2020	
300 m hurdles	39.42	Sara Petersen	Denmark	11 June 2020	2020	
400 m hurdles	52.30	Femke Bol	Netherlands	15 June 2023	2023	
3000 m steeplechase	9:02.60	Faith Cherotich	Kenya	12 June 2025	2025	
High jump	2.05 m	Stefka Kostadinova	Bulgaria	4 July 1987	1987	
Pole vault	4.85 m	Yelena Isinbayeva	Russia	15 June 2007	2007	
Long jump	7.29 m (+0.9 m/s)	Heike Drechsler	Germany	22 July 1994	1994	
Triple jump	15.11 m (+0.1 m/s)	Yamilé Aldama	Cuba	27 June 2003	2003	
Shot put	20.74 m	Chase Jackson	United States	10 June 2026	2026	
Discus throw	69.78 m	Tsvetanka Khristova	Bulgaria	5 July 1986	1986	
Javelin throw	76.34 m (old design)	Fatima Whitbread	United Kingdom	4 July 1987	1987	
Javelin throw	69.48 m (current design)	Trine Hattestad	Norway	28 July 2000	2000	
3000 m walk	13:45.7 h	Frøydis Hilsen	Norway	23 August 1981	1981	
5000 m walk	22:59.6 h	Anita Blomberg	Norway	17 June 1988	1988	
4 × 100 m relay	43.69	Jamile Samuel; Tasa Jiya; Leonie van Vliet; Naomi Sedney	Netherlands	16 June 2022	2022	
4 × 400 m relay	3:28.38 DLR	Carys McAulay; Ama Pipi; Lina Nielsen; Nicole Kendall	Great Britain	15 June 2023	2023	

== See also ==
- Dream Mile
