= Boaz Kiprugut =

Kenyan athlete (born 1998)

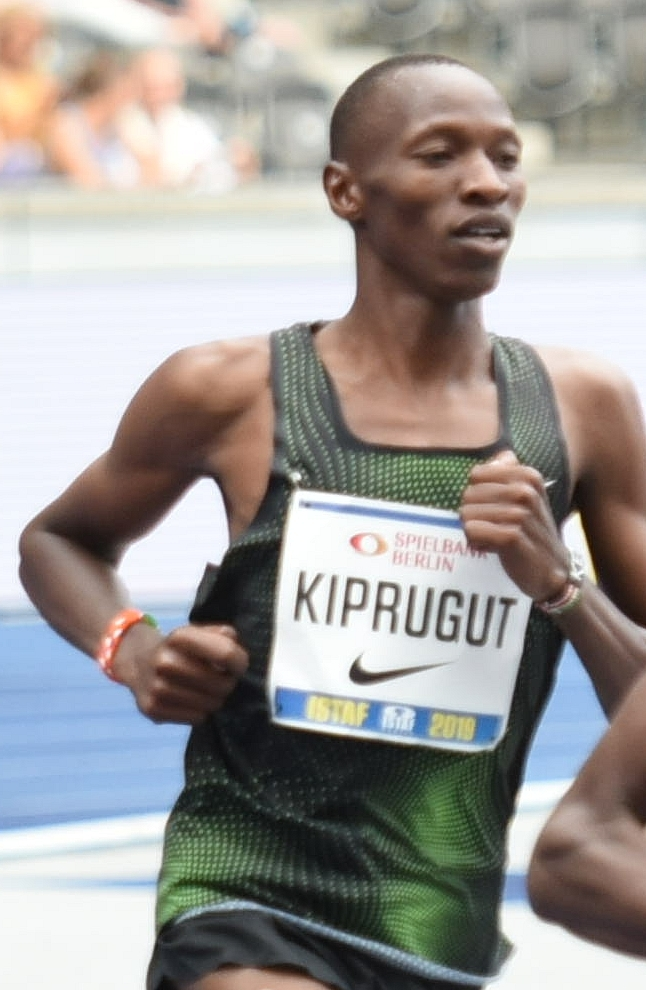

Personal information
- Nationality: Kenyan
- Born: 18 May 1998 (age 28)

Sport
- Sport: Athletics
- Events: 800m, 1500m
Medal record
Athletics
Representing Kenya
African Championships
Silver medal – second place	2024 Douala	1500 m

Boaz Kiprugut (born 18 May 1998) is a Kenyan middle-distance runner. He was a bronze medalist at the 2024 African Championships in Athletics over 1500 metres.

== Career ==
He was a bronze medalist over 1500 metres at the 2017 African U20 Championships over 1500 metres.

He was a pacemaker at the 2023 Bislett Games as Jakob Ingebrigtsen set a new European record over 1500 metres. He was also a pacemaker as Ingebrigtsen broke the world record in the men's 2000 metres at the Brussels Diamond League meeting in September 2023.

He was a finalist over 1500 metres at the Kenyan Athletics Championships in May 2024, placing third, and was a finalist over that distance at the Kenyan Olympic Trials in June 2024.

He was bronze medalist in the 1500 metres behind his compatriot Brian Komen in Douala, Cameroon at the 2024 African Championships in Athletics. He was a pacemaker as Ingebrigtsen won the 1500m Diamond League final in Brussels in September 2024.
