= Line Kloster =

Norwegian athletics competitor

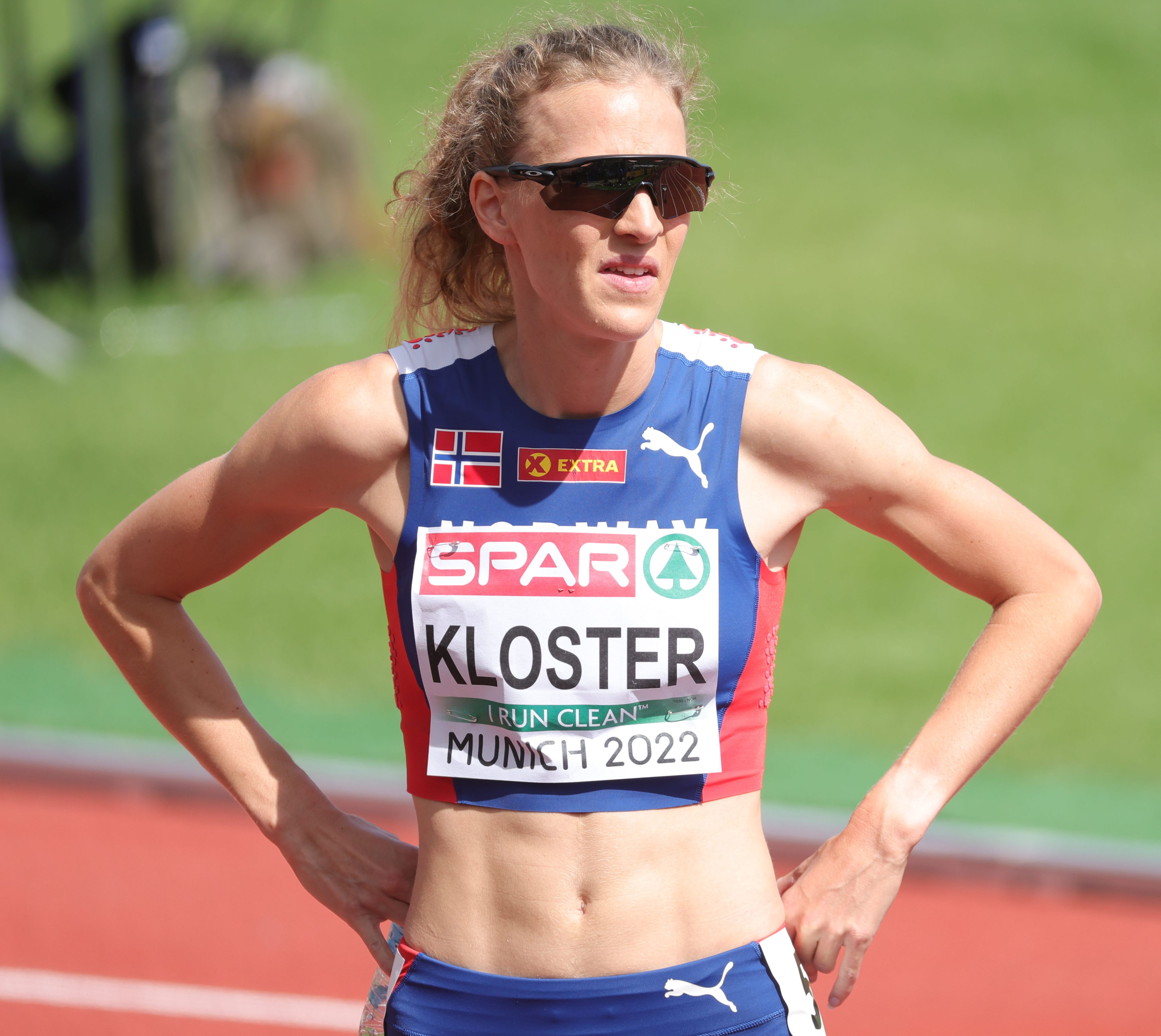
- Kloster in 2022

Personal information
- Born: 27 February 1990 (age 36) Oslo, Norway
- Home town: Asker, Norway
- Height: 179 cm (5 ft 10 in)

Sport
- Sport: Athletics
- Events: 400 m hurdles, 400 m
- Club: Asker SK (−2009); SK Vidar (2010−)
- Coached by: Petar Vukičević

Line Kloster (born 27 February 1990) is a Norwegian athlete specialising in the 400 metres and 400 metres hurdles. She reached the semifinal of the 2013 European Indoor Championships where she set a new national indoor record of 52.78 narrowly missing the final.

== International competitions ==
Year	Competition	Venue	Position	Event	Notes
Representing Norway
2009	European Junior Championships	Novi Sad, Serbia	5th (h)	100 m hurdles	13.73^{1}
2009	European Junior Championships	Novi Sad, Serbia	4th	4 × 400 m relay	3:41.86
2011	European U23 Championships	Ostrava, Czech Republic	7th	400 m	54.18
2012	European Championships	Helsinki, Finland	11th (h)	4 × 400 m relay	3:37.74
2013	European Indoor Championships	Gothenburg, Sweden	6th (sf)	400 m	52.78
2014	European Championships	Zürich, Switzerland	25th (h)	400 m hurdles	54.27
2014	European Championships	Zürich, Switzerland	13th (h)	4 × 400 m relay	3:36.57
2015	European Indoor Championships	Prague, Czech Republic	22nd (h)	400 m	54.21
2016	European Championships	Amsterdam, Netherlands	12th (h)	4 × 400 m relay	3:31.73
2018	European Championships	Berlin, Germany	10th (sf)	400 m hurdles	55.78
2021	Olympic Games	Tokyo, Japan	29th (h)	400 m hurdles	56.45
2022	European Championships	Munich, Germany	12th (sf)	400 m hurdles	55.63
2023	World Championships	Budapest, Hungary	20th (sf)	400 m hurdles	55.43
2024	European Championships	Rome, Italy	6th	400 m hurdles	55.29
2024	Olympic Games	Paris, France	18th (rep)	400 m hurdles	56.73

== Personal bests ==
Outdoor

- 200 metres – 23.21 (+2.0 m/s, Bulle 2018)
- 400 metres – 52.78 (Oslo 2013)
- 100 metres hurdles – 13.54 (-1.9 m/s, Askoy 2016)
- 400 metres hurdles – 55.49 (La Chaux-de-Fonds 2018)

Indoor

- 200 metres – 24.30 (Steinkjer 2015)
- 400 metres – 52.78 (Gothenburg 2013)
