= Holmestrand (disambiguation) =

Holmestrand may refer to:

== Places ==
- Holmestrand Municipality, a municipality in Vestfold county, Norway
- Holmestrand (town), a town in Holmestrand Municipality in Vestfold county, Norway
- Holmestrand (South Georgia), a point on the south coast of South Georgia

== Railways ==
- Holmestrand–Vittingfoss Line, an abandoned railway between Holmestrand to Hvittingfoss in Norway
- Holmestrand Station, a railway station in Holmestrand Municipality in Vestfold county, Norway
- Holmestrand Private Station, a former railway station in Holmestrand Municipality in Vestfold county, Norway

== Other ==
- Holmestrand Aluminium Museum, a museum in the town of Holmestrand in Vestfold county, Norway
- Holmestrand District Court, a former district court in Vestfold county, Norway
