= Skjeggestad Bridge =

Skjeggestad Bridge Skjeggestadbrua
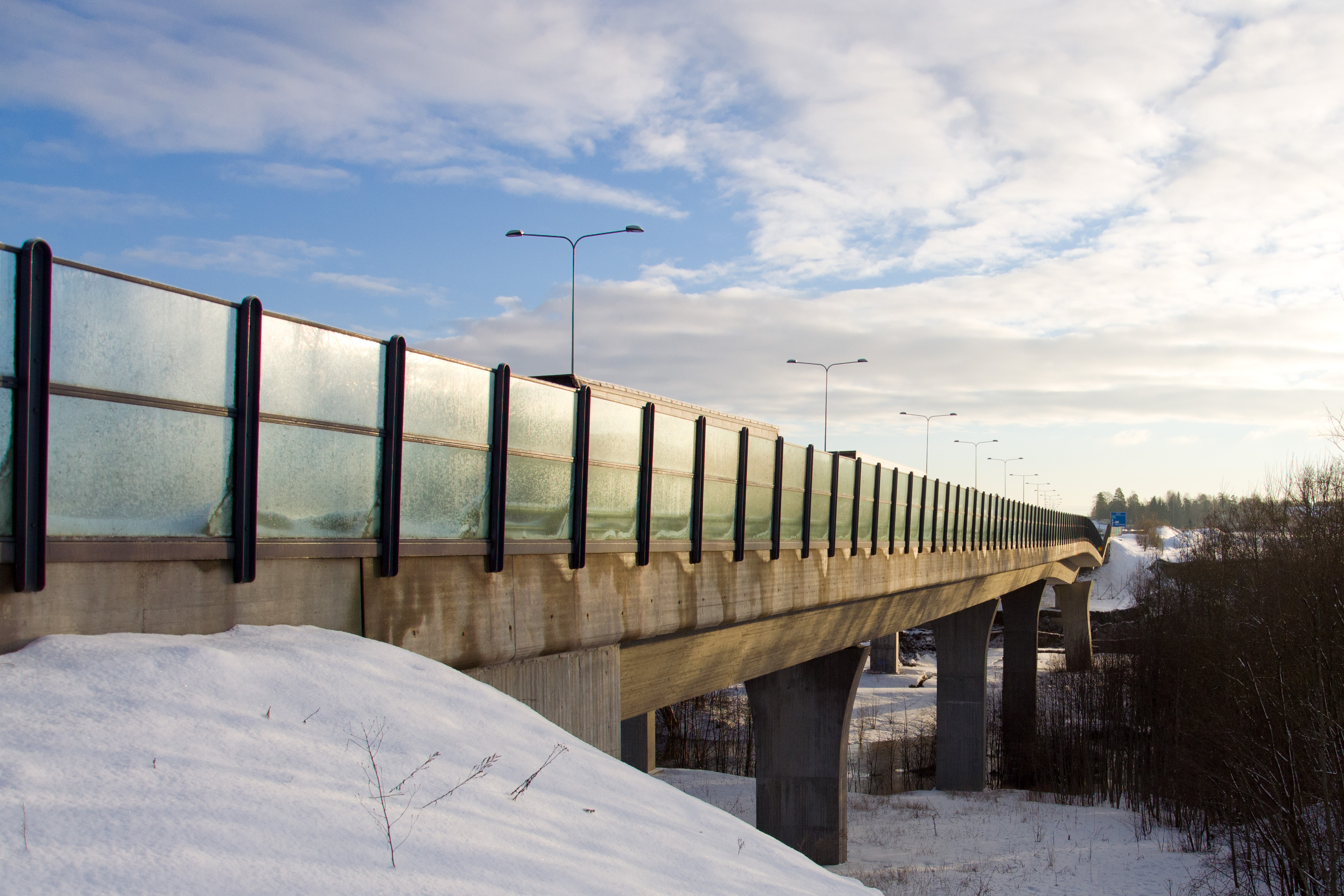
- Coordinates: 59.470596°N 10.299017°E
- Carries: E18
- Crosses: Mofjellbekken river
- Locale: Holmestrand Municipality

Characteristics
- Total length: 229 metres (751 ft)
- Longest span: 39 metres (128 ft)

History
- Opened: 2001 (2016)

Skjeggestad Bridge (Norwegian: Skjeggestadbrua) is the name of two parallel highway bridges on the European route E18 highway in Holmestrand Municipality in Vestfold county, Norway. The bridges are located about 2 kilometres (1.2 mi) southwest of the town of Holmestrand.

== History ==
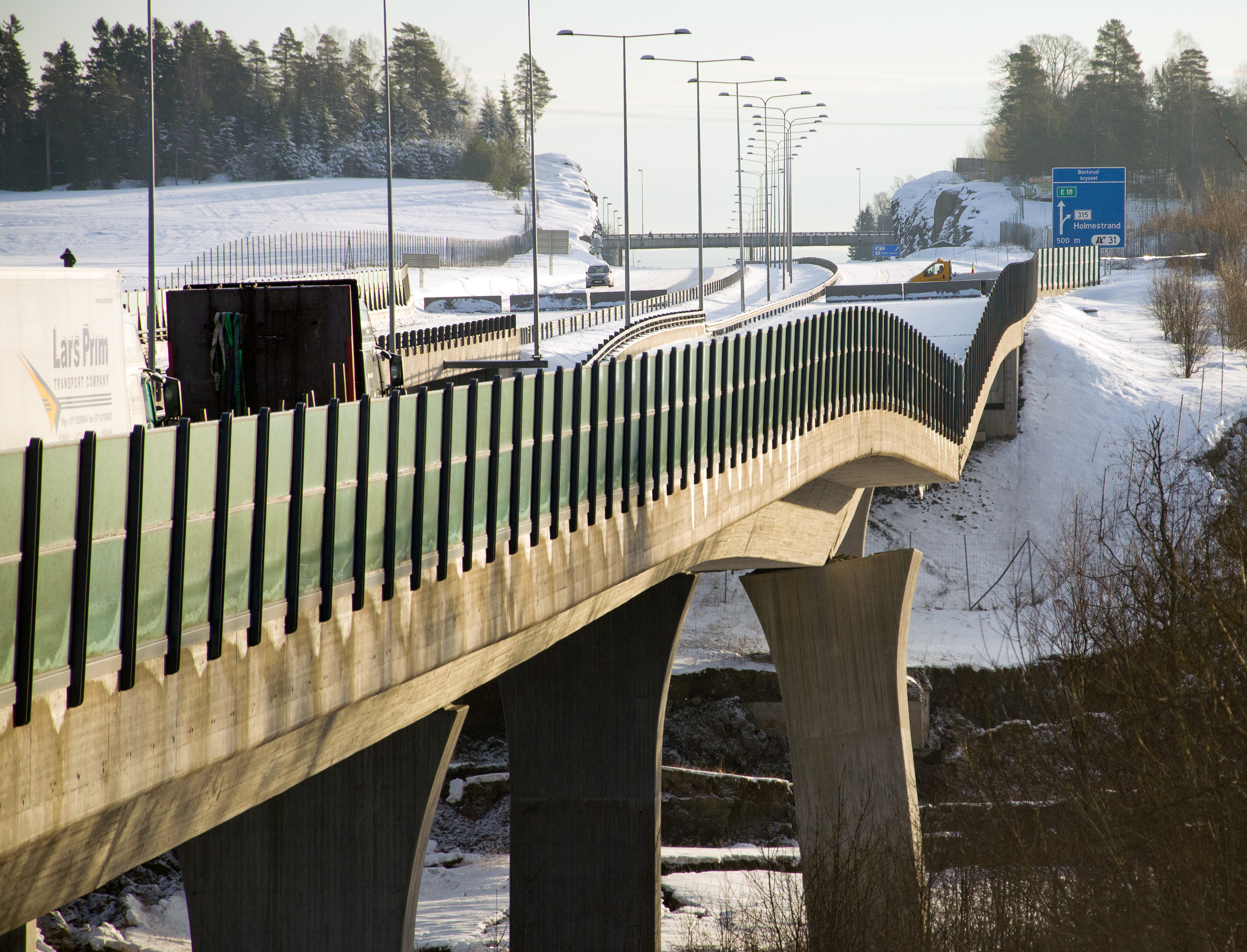
The collapsed bridge

On 2 February 2015, the southbound bridge partially collapsed. No one was injured and both bridges were closed after collapse. The collapse was caused by a landslide in the quick clay surrounding a support pillar. The southbound lane was fully destroyed in controlled explosive demolitions on 21 February and 25 March 2015. The northbound lane was repaired and reopened to two-way traffic on 26 June 2015. The southbound lane was partially reopened on 1 July and fully operational on 4 July 2016, 17 months after the collapse.

== See also ==
- List of bridges in Norway
- List of bridges in Norway by length
