= Bjerkøya =

Island in Vestfold, Norway

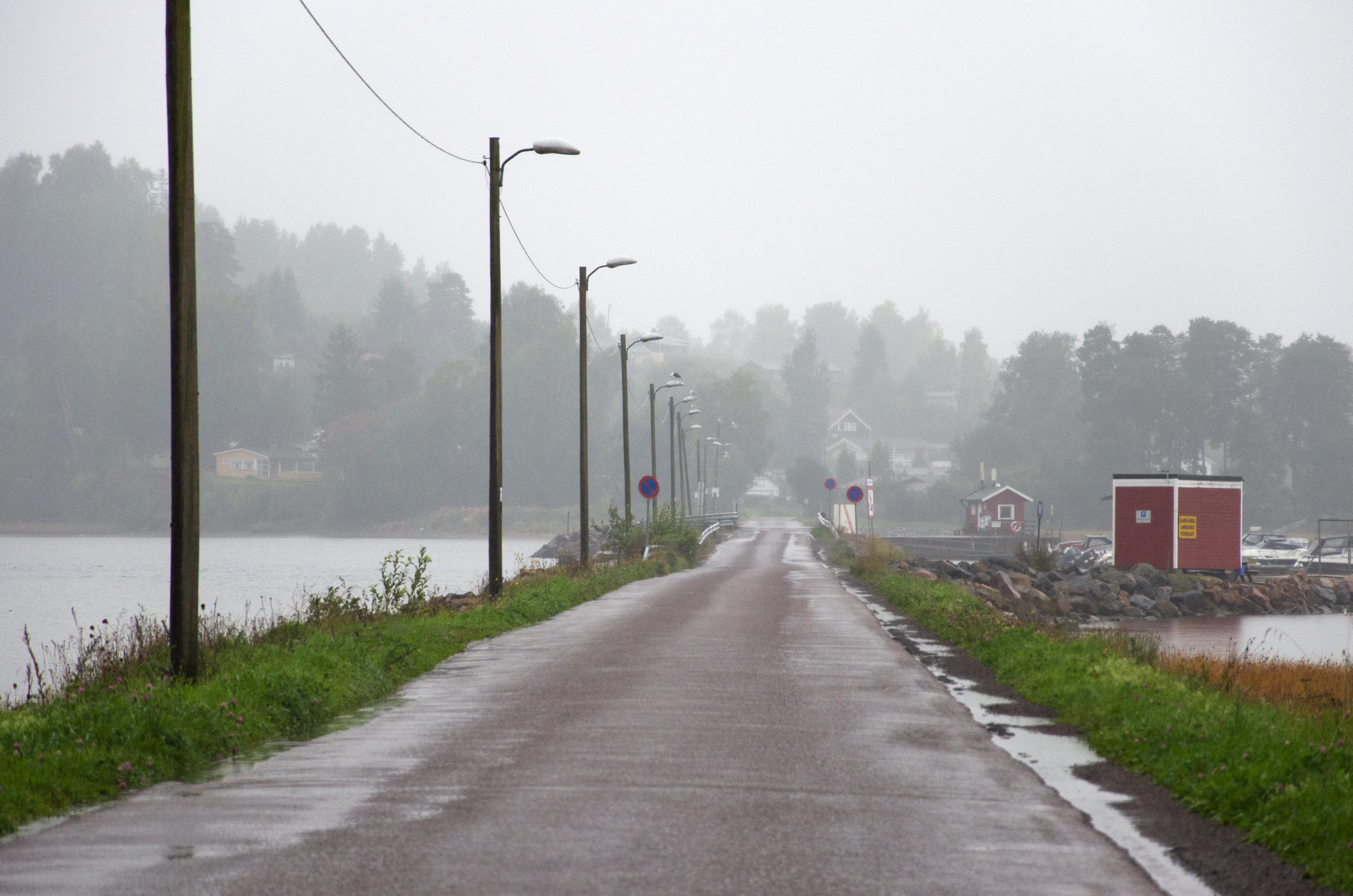
- The causeway bridge to Bjerkøya
- Interactive map of the island

Geography
- Location: Vestfold, Norway
- Coordinates: 59.52044°N 10.34853°E
- Area: 0.8 km^{2} (0.31 sq mi)
- Coastline: 4 km (2.5 mi)

Administration
- Norway
- County: Vestfold
- Municipality: Holmestrand Municipality

Bjerkøya is a populated island in Holmestrand Municipality in Vestfold county, Norway. The 0.8-square-kilometre (200-acre) island lies in the Ytre Oslofjord, near the mouth of the Drammensfjorden. It lies about 4 kilometres (2.5 mi) to the north of the town of Holmestrand in a small group of islands including Kommersøya, Killingholmen, and Langøya. Bjerkøya is connected to the mainland by a 600-metre (2,000 ft) long causeway bridge on the north end of the island. The island was formerly part of the old Sande Municipality until 1 January 2020 when it became part of Holmestrand Municipality.

The coastal parts of the island, particularly in the north end form one large village, also called Bjerkøya. The interior and southeastern parts of the island are sparsely populated. The 0.45-square-kilometre (110-acre) village had a population (2012) of 225 and a population density of 500 inhabitants per square kilometre (1,300/sq mi). Since 2012, the population and area data for this village area has not been separately tracked by Statistics Norway.

== See also ==
- List of islands of Norway
