= Sigurd Normann =

Norwegian newspaper editor and politician

Sigurd Normann (9 April 1874 – 14 July 1950) was a Norwegian newspaper editor and politician for the Conservative Party.

He was born in Nanset, but after spending the years 1891 to 1895 in Germany and northern England, he settled in Holmestrand where he owned and edited the newspaper Jarlsberg from 1904 to 1933.

He was a member of Holmestrand Municipality council from 1910 to 1919 and 1925 to 1937, serving as mayor from 1916 to 1919 and 1927 to 1931. He was elected as a deputy representative to the Parliament of Norway in 1930 from the constituency Market towns of Vestfold county.

From 1933 he reverted to just writing in Jarlsberg, and was also managing director and chairman of the board of Holmestrand Samlag. He died in 1950.
