= Gullhaug, Vestfold =

Village in Holmestrand Municipality, Norway

Gullhaug
- Village
- Interactive map of Gullhaug
- Coordinates: 59.50286°N 10.24952°E
- Country: Norway
- Region: Eastern Norway
- County: Vestfold
- District: Jarlsberg
- Municipality: Holmestrand Municipality

Area
  - Total: 1.41 km^{2} (0.54 sq mi)
- Elevation: 139 m (456 ft)

Population (2026)
  - Total: 2,684
  - Density: 1,904/km^{2} (4,930/sq mi)
- Time zone: UTC+01:00 (CET)
  - Summer (DST): UTC+02:00 (CEST)
- Post Code: 3089 Holmestrand

Gullhaug is a village in Holmestrand Municipality in Vestfold county, Norway. The village is located about 3 kilometres (1.9 mi) to the northwest of the town of Holmestrand and about 7 kilometres (4.3 mi) to the southeast of the village of Sundbyfoss. The European route E18 highway passes by the village about 2 kilometres (1.2 mi) to the west. The village is mainly a residential area.

The 1.41-square-kilometre (350-acre) village has a population (2026) of 2,684 and a population density of 1,904 inhabitants per square kilometre (4,930/sq mi).
