= Sundbyfoss =

Village in Holmestrand Municipality, Norway

- Village
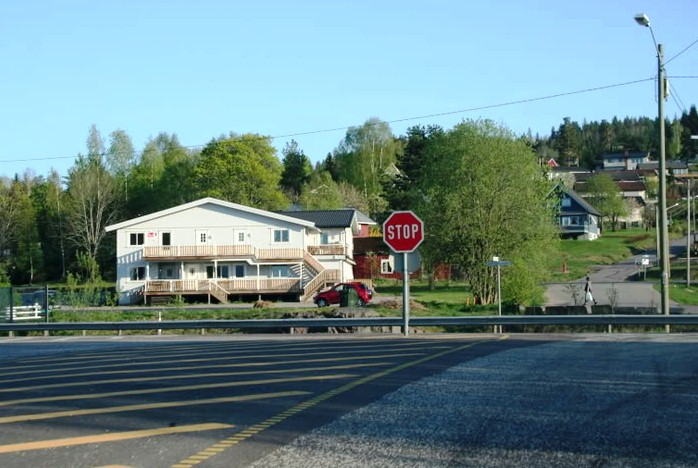
- View of the village in 2013
- Interactive map of Sundbyfoss
- Coordinates: 59.51188°N 10.12565°E
- Country: Norway
- Region: Eastern Norway
- County: Vestfold
- District: Jarlsberg
- Municipality: Holmestrand Municipality

Area
  - Total: 0.47 km^{2} (0.18 sq mi)
- Elevation: 80 m (260 ft)

Population (2026)
  - Total: 554
  - Density: 1,179/km^{2} (3,050/sq mi)
- Time zone: UTC+01:00 (CET)
  - Summer (DST): UTC+02:00 (CEST)
- Post Code: 3092 Sundbyfoss

Sundbyfoss is a village in Holmestrand Municipality in Vestfold county, Norway. The village is located along the lake Hillestadvannet, about 3 kilometres (1.9 mi) south of the village of Hof. The village of Gullhaug lies about 7 kilometres (4.3 mi) to the southeast and the town of Holmestrand lies about 10 kilometres (6.2 mi) to the southeast. The village of Hvittingfoss in Kongsberg Municipality lies about 8 kilometres (5.0 mi) to the west. Hillestad Church lies about 3 kilometres (1.9 mi) east of the village.

The 0.47-square-kilometre (120-acre) village has a population (2026) of 554 and a population density of 1,179 inhabitants per square kilometre (3,050/sq mi).

Sundbyfoss is named after the local waterfall on the river Sundbyelva. The waterfall provided the basis for early industry in the village. Today, Sundbyfoss is mainly a residential area. The largest industrial enterprise is the "Haslestad Bruk" sawmill. Historically, the old private Tønsberg–Eidsfoss railway line and Holmestrand–Vittingfoss railway line both went through Sundbyfoss.
