= Holmestrand Municipality =

Municipality in Vestfold, Norway

Holmestrand Municipality Holmestrand kommune
- Municipality
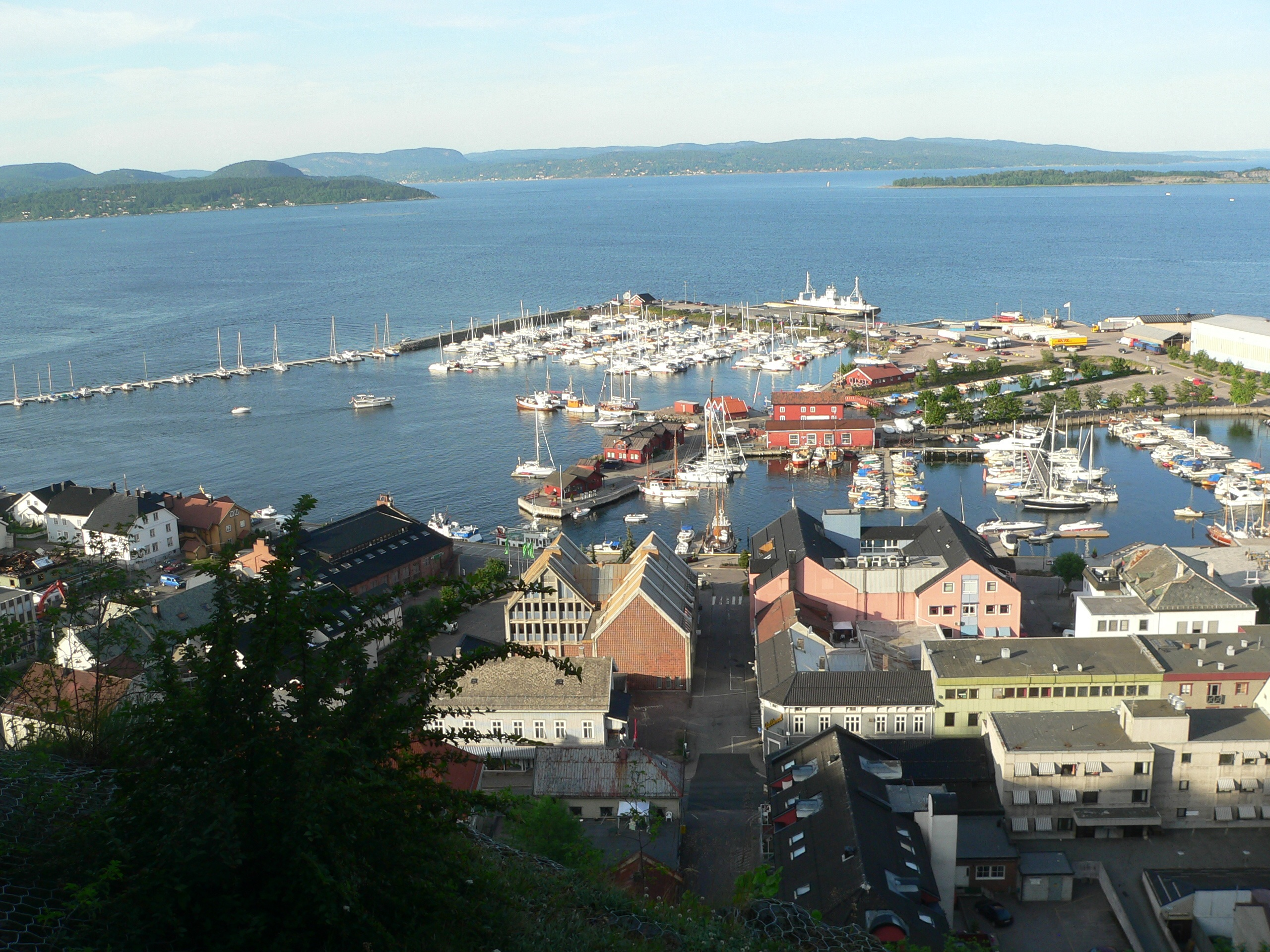

- Coat of arms

- Vestfold within Norway

- Holmestrand within Vestfold
- Coordinates: 59°29′43″N 10°14′55″E
- Country: Norway
- County: Vestfold
- District: Jarlsberg
- Established: 1 Jan 1838
  - Created as: Formannskapsdistrikt
- Administrative centre: Holmestrand

Government
  - Mayor (2023): Alf Johan Svele (H)

Area
  - Total: 432.36 km^{2} (166.94 sq mi)
  - Land: 411.77 km^{2} (158.99 sq mi)
  - Water: 20.59 km^{2} (7.95 sq mi) 4.8%
  - Rank: #228 in Norway
- Highest elevation (Vestfjellet): 633.96 m (2,079.9 ft)

Population (2026)
  - Total: 27,086
  - Rank: #45 in Norway
  - Density: 65.8/km^{2} (170/sq mi)
  - Change (10 years): ▲ +16.7%
- Demonym: Holmestranding

Official language
  - Norwegian form: Neutral
- Time zone: UTC+01:00 (CET)
  - Summer (DST): UTC+02:00 (CEST)
- ISO 3166 code: NO-3903
- Website: Official website

Holmestrand (Norwegian pronunciation: [¹hɔlməstrɑn]; locally [¹hɔlməʂʈrɑn]) is a municipality in Vestfold, Norway. It is located in the traditional district of Jarlsberg. The administrative centre of the municipality is the town of Holmestrand. Some of the notable villages in Holmestrand include Eidsfoss, Eikeberg, Gullhaug, Hof, Klever, Sande, Selvik, and Sundbyfoss.

The 432.36-square-kilometre (166.94 sq mi) municipality is the 228th largest by area out of the 357 municipalities in Norway. Holmestrand Municipality is the 45th most populous municipality in Norway with a population of 27,086. The municipality's population density is 65.8 inhabitants per square kilometre (170/sq mi) and its population has increased by 16.7% over the previous 10-year period.

== General information ==
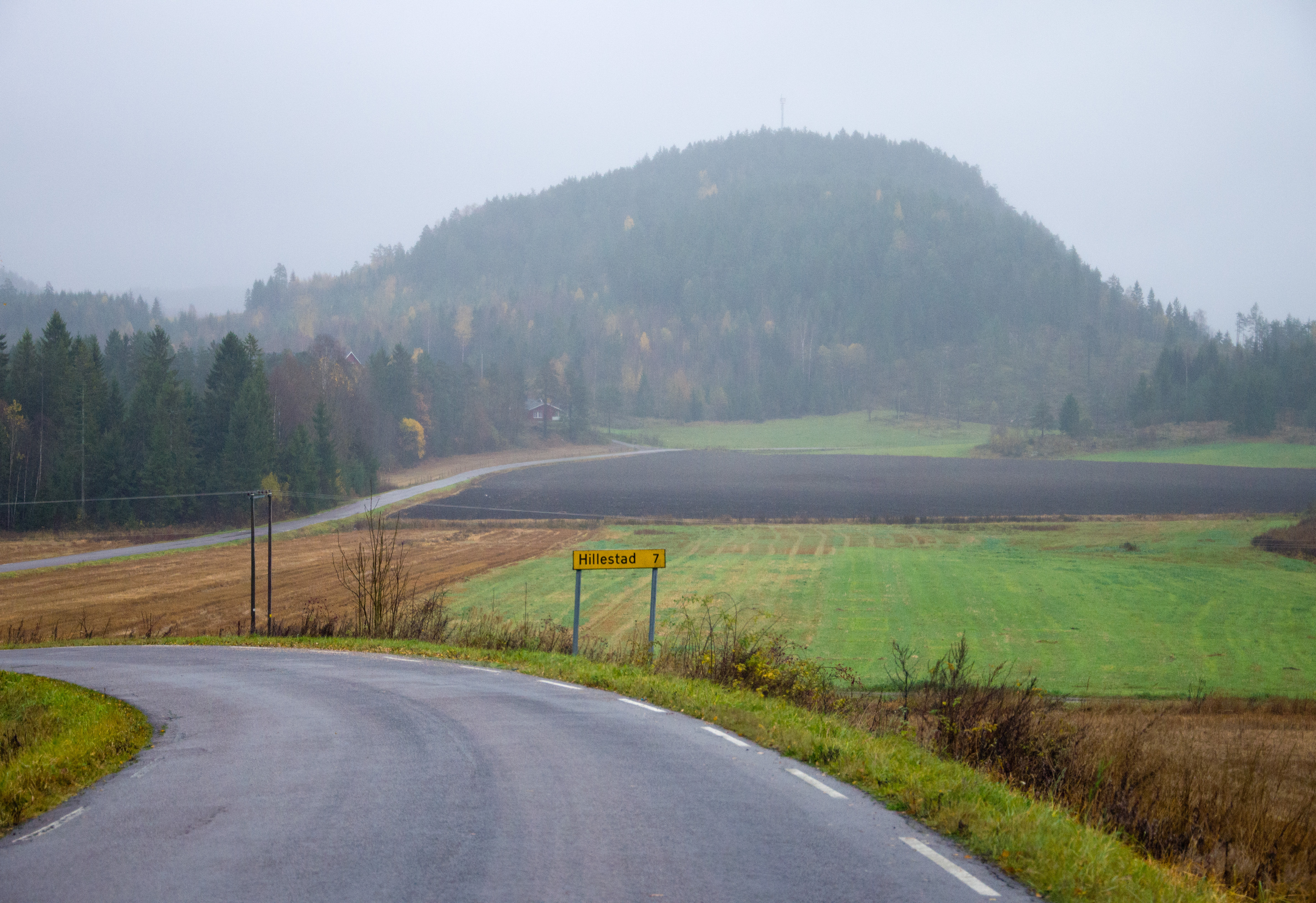
Kaldåkeråsen

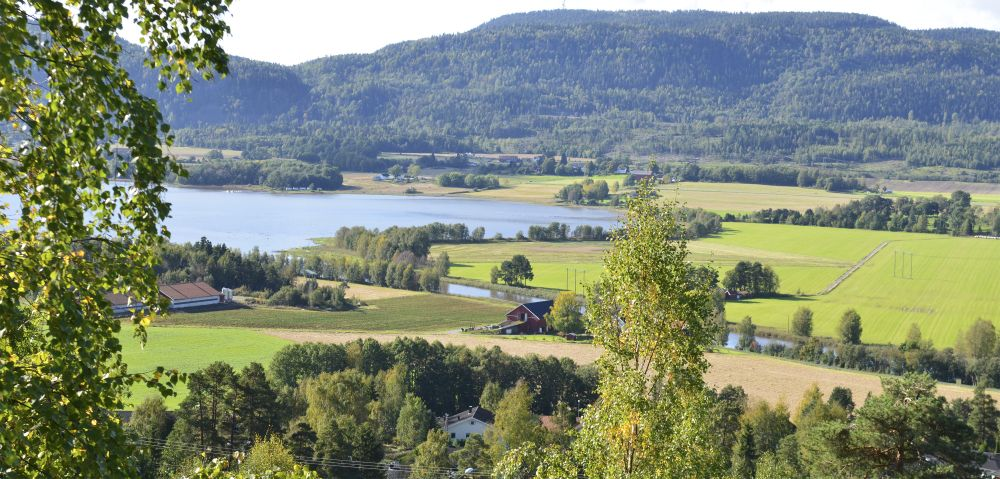
Sandebukta, the head of the fjord near Sande i Vestfold

=== Administrative history ===
The formannskapsdistrikt law of 1837 created a system of local government in Norway by establishing each town (ladested or kjøpstad) and each Church of Norway prestegjeld as a civil municipality. On 1 January 1838, the kjøpstad of Holmestrand was established as Holmestrand Municipality. In 1942, an area of neighboring Botne Municipality (population: 148) was transferred into Holmestrand Municipality.

During the 1960s, there were many municipal mergers across Norway due to the work of the Schei Committee. On 1 January 1964, Botne Municipality (population: 4,656) was dissolved and merged with Holmestrand Municipality (population: 1,956) to form an enlarged Holmestrand Municipality. Prior to 1964, the Holmestrand Municipality consisted of only the 0.63 square kilometres (0.24 sq mi) town of Holmestrand, and after the merger, the municipality was 84.25 square kilometres (32.53 sq mi) with a population of 6,612 residents.

From 2017 to 2020, there were many municipal and county mergers across Norway due to the work of the Solberg cabinet. On 1 January 2018, Hof Municipality (population: 3,176) was dissolved and merged with Holmestrand Municipality (population: 10,861) to form an enlarged Holmestrand Municipality.

On 1 January 2020, the following areas were merged to form an enlarged Holmestrand Municipality:

- all of Holmestrand Municipality (population: 14,371)
- all of Sande Municipality (population: 9,904)
- the 690-decare (0.69 km^{2}; 170-acre) coastal and island areas of Re Municipality (the rest of Re Municipality became part of Tønsberg Municipality)

Also on 1 January 2020, the municipality became a part of the newly-formed Vestfold og Telemark county (after Telemark and Vestfold counties were merged). The merger was shortlived, and on 1 January 2024, the merger was undone and this municipality became part of Vestfold county once again.

=== Name ===
The municipality (originally the town) is named Holmestrand (Old Norse: Hólmastrọnd). The first element is the genitive case of the word holmi which means "rocky islet". The last element is strand which means "shore" or "beach". This is likely referring to three small islets that were located just offshore where the town is now located. The islets are no longer visible due to infilled land reclamation efforts.

=== Coat of arms ===
The first coat of arms for Holmestrand was granted on 14 November 1898 and in use until 1 January 2020. The official blazon is "Gules, an eagle displayed argent holding in dexter an anchor Or and in sinister a rod of Aesculapius also Or and in an inescutcheon azure a frigate argent" (Norwegian: På rød bunn en sølv, flakt ørn som i høyre klo holder et gull anker og i venstre en gull æskulapstav. I blått hjerteskjold en sølv fregatt.). This means the arms have a red field (background) and the charge is an eagle. The eagle has a tincture of argent which means it is commonly colored white, but if it is made out of metal, then silver is used. The eagle in the arms is derived from the arms of the merchant Johan Heinrich Tordenskiold, who, in 1819, donated all his fortune to build a school in Holmestrand. The shield on the eagle shows his frigate Hvide Ørn ("White Eagle"), pictured in silver on a field of blue. The right claw of the eagle holds a golden anchor which symbolises that Holmestrand is a centuries-old maritime town. The eagle holds in its left claw a golden rod of Asclepius, symbolizing the Greek god of medicine. The snake rod represents the town's health spa, which was established in 1840 and in use for over 100 years. The arms had a golden mural crown above it, symbolizing its status as a town. The arms were designed by Andreas Bloch. A municipal flag with the same design as the coat of arms was approved in 1981.

The present coat of arms was approved for use starting on 1 January 2020, after a large municipal merger took place, greatly increasing the size of Holmestrand. The new arms were developed as part of a local competition which had 588 entries. From them, ten finalists were selected before the municipal council chose the winning design. The official blazon is "Per fess wavy offset to base azure and argent, an oak leaf argent and three wavy lines azure" (Norwegian: I blått over en sølv skjoldfot avdelt med et enkelt bølgesnitt, et sølv opprett eikeblad uten bladstamme. I skjoldfoten, tre enkle, svevende blå bølger 1-1-1.). This means the arms are divided with a wavy horizontal line towards in the bottom of the arms. The field (background) above the line has a tincture of azure (blue). Below the line, the field has a tincture of argent which means it is commonly colored white, but if it is made out of metal, then silver is used. On the top portion of the arms, there a large white or silver oak leaf standing vertically and below the line, there is a set of three blue wavy lines symbolizing an ocean wave. The oak leaf symbolizes the oak forests in the municipality. It also symbolizes the fjord cutting into the municipality. The waves below symbolize the maritime heritage of the coastal municipality. The area was historically known for its timber trade which ties forests and the ocean together.

Coats of arms of Holmestrand

Current coat of arms
(1 Jan 2020–present)

Former coat of arms
(14 Nov 1898–31 Dec 2019)

=== Churches ===
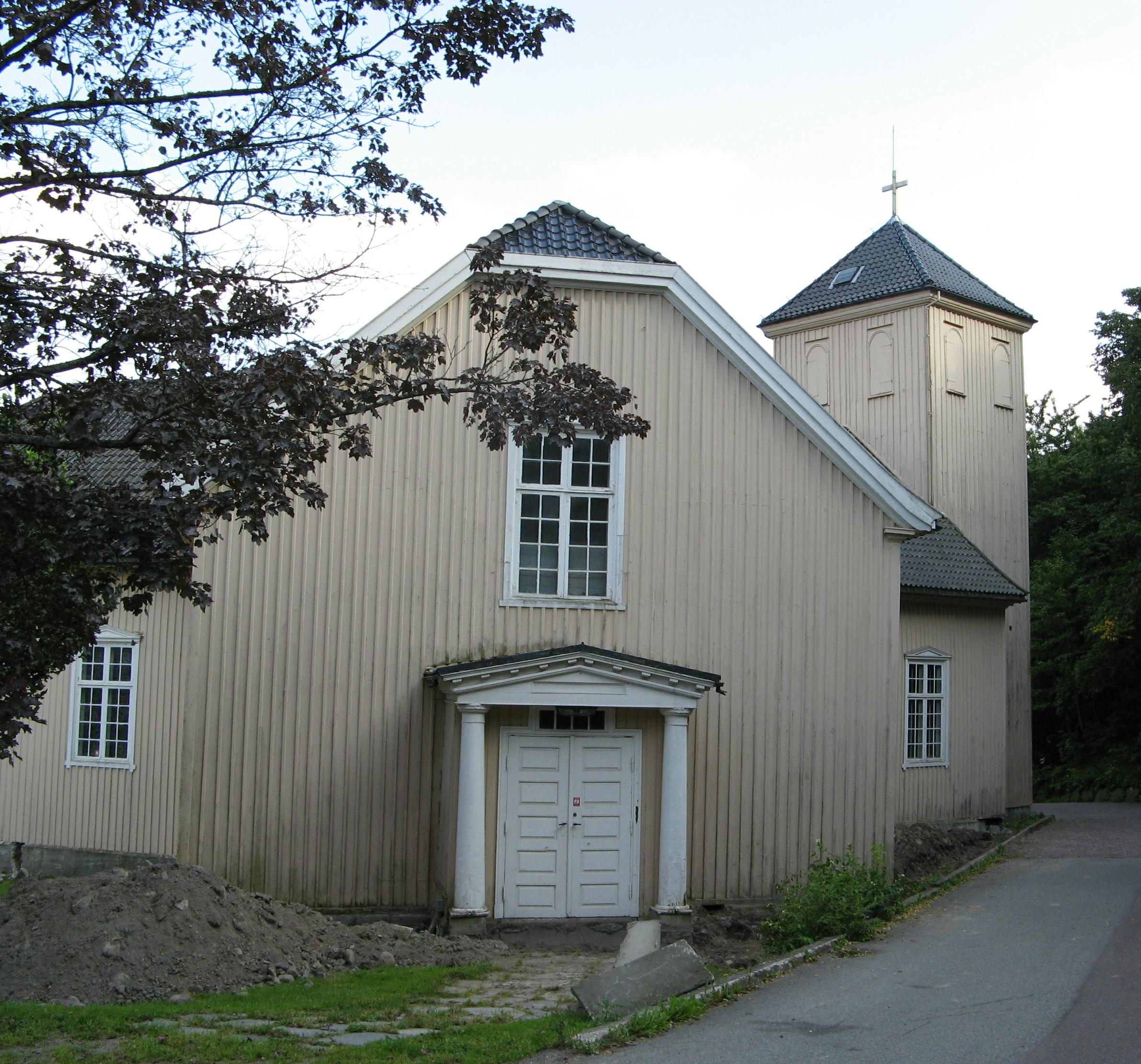
Holmestrand Church

The Church of Norway has three parishes (sokn) within Holmestrand Municipality. It is part of the Nord-Jarlsberg prosti (deanery) in the Diocese of Tunsberg.

Churches in Holmestrand Municipality
Parish (sokn)	Church name	Location of the church	Year built
Botne	Botne Church	Botne	c. 1200
Botne	Hillestad Church	Hillestad	1724
Botne	Holmestrand Church	Holmestrand	1675
Hof, Vassås og Eidsfoss	Eidsfoss Church	Eidsfoss	1904
Hof, Vassås og Eidsfoss	Hof Church	Hof	c. 1150
Hof, Vassås og Eidsfoss	Vassås Church	Vassås	c. 1200
Sande	Sande Church	Sande i Vestfold	c. 1093

== Geography ==
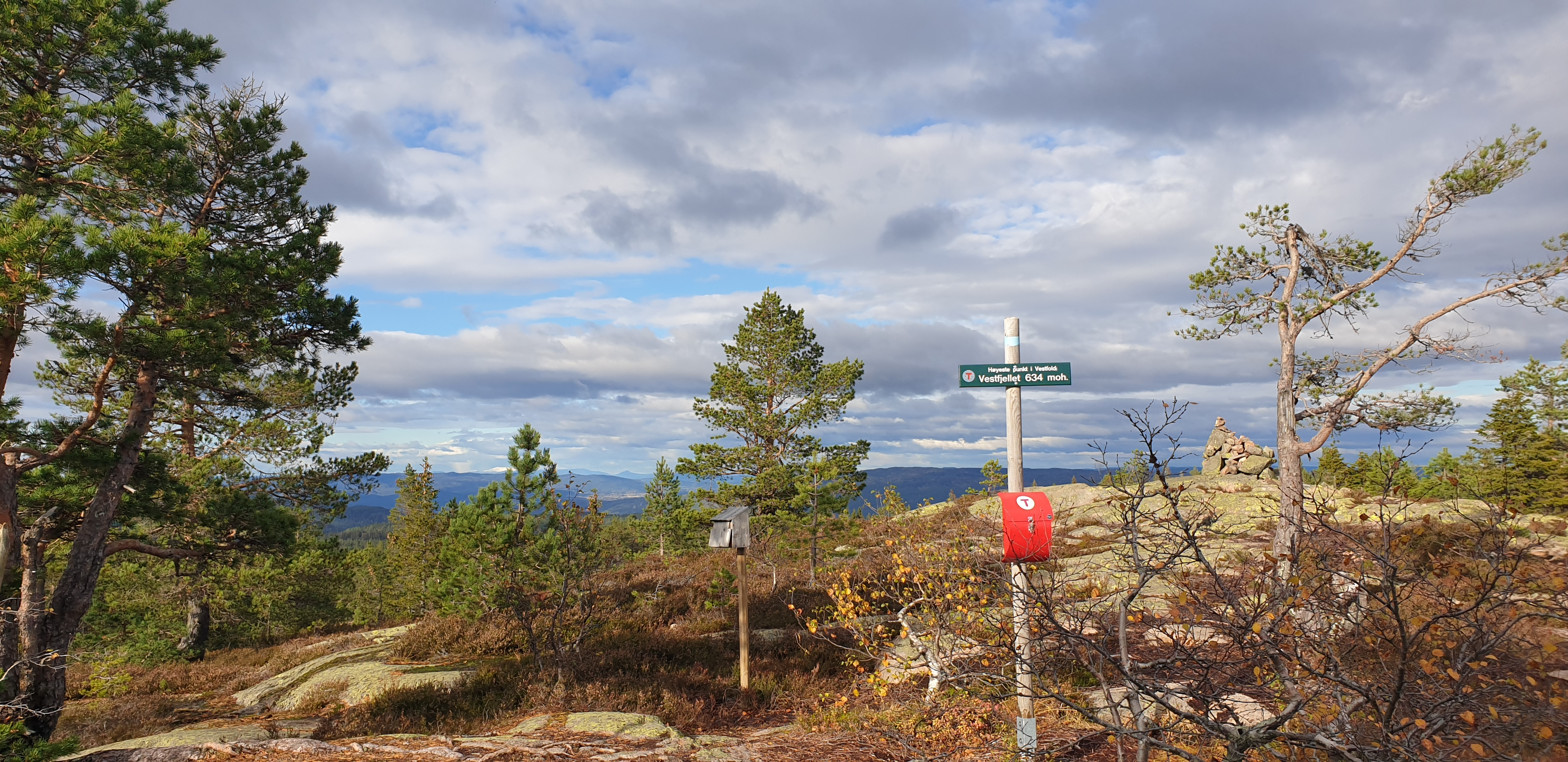
Vestfjellet mountain

Holmestrand Municipality is located in the northernmost part of Vestfold county. Øvre Eiker Municipality (in Buskerud county) lies to the northwest, Drammen Municipality (also in Buskerud county) lies to the north and east, Horten Municipality and Tønsberg Municipality lie to the south, and Kongsberg Municipality (in Buskerud county) and Larvik Municipality lie to the west. The Ytre Oslofjord and Drammensfjorden are both located on the east side of the municipality. The islands of Langøya and Bjerkøya are located in the ocean on the east side of the municipality as well. The large lake Eikeren is partially located in northwestern Holmestrand. The highest point in the municipality is the 633.96-metre (2,079.9 ft) tall mountain Vestfjellet. There are several other mountains located in northwestern Holmestrand, including Buaren, Grøntjernkollen, Lauvkollen, and Skibergfjellet.

=== Climate ===
Climate data for Sande – Galleberg 1991–2020 (60 m, average high/low 1996-2025)
Month	Jan	Feb	Mar	Apr	May	Jun	Jul	Aug	Sep	Oct	Nov	Dec	Year
Mean daily maximum °C (°F)	0.1 (32.2)	1.3 (34.3)	5.6 (42.1)	11.3 (52.3)	16.9 (62.4)	20.9 (69.6)	22.9 (73.2)	21.6 (70.9)	17.1 (62.8)	10.6 (51.1)	5.3 (41.5)	1.2 (34.2)	11.2 (52.2)
Daily mean °C (°F)	−2.6 (27.3)	−2.2 (28.0)	0.8 (33.4)	5.5 (41.9)	10.9 (51.6)	14.6 (58.3)	17.1 (62.8)	16.0 (60.8)	11.6 (52.9)	6.1 (43.0)	2.0 (35.6)	−1.8 (28.8)	6.5 (43.7)
Mean daily minimum °C (°F)	−5.9 (21.4)	−5.4 (22.3)	−3.1 (26.4)	1.1 (34.0)	5.8 (42.4)	9.8 (49.6)	11.8 (53.2)	11 (52)	7.8 (46.0)	3.4 (38.1)	−0.4 (31.3)	−4.6 (23.7)	2.6 (36.7)
Average precipitation mm (inches)	67 (2.6)	45 (1.8)	45 (1.8)	53 (2.1)	73 (2.9)	87 (3.4)	82 (3.2)	102 (4.0)	91 (3.6)	103 (4.1)	104 (4.1)	76 (3.0)	928 (36.5)
Source 1: yr.no (mean, precipitation)
Source 2: seklima (average high/low)

== Government ==
Holmestrand Municipality is responsible for primary education (through 10th grade), outpatient health services, senior citizen services, welfare and other social services, zoning, economic development, and municipal roads and utilities. The municipality is governed by a municipal council of directly elected representatives. The mayor is indirectly elected by a vote of the municipal council. The municipality is under the jurisdiction of the Vestfold District Court and the Agder Court of Appeal.

=== Municipal council ===
The municipal council (Kommunestyre) of Holmestrand Municipality is made up of 35 representatives that are elected to four-year terms. The tables below show the current and historical composition of the council by political party.

Holmestrand kommunestyre 2023–2027
Party name (in Norwegian)	Number of representatives
Labour Party (Arbeiderpartiet)	7
Progress Party (Fremskrittspartiet)	7
Green Party (Miljøpartiet De Grønne)	1
Conservative Party (Høyre)	11
Industry and Business Party (Industri‑ og Næringspartiet)	2
Christian Democratic Party (Kristelig Folkeparti)	1
Red Party (Rødt)	1
Centre Party (Senterpartiet)	2
Socialist Left Party (Sosialistisk Venstreparti)	2
Liberal Party (Venstre)	1
Total number of members:	35

Holmestrand kommunestyre 2019–2023
Party name (in Norwegian)	Number of representatives
Labour Party (Arbeiderpartiet)	11
Progress Party (Fremskrittspartiet)	4
Green Party (Miljøpartiet De Grønne)	2
Conservative Party (Høyre)	11
Christian Democratic Party (Kristelig Folkeparti)	1
Red Party (Rødt)	1
Centre Party (Senterpartiet)	4
Socialist Left Party (Sosialistisk Venstreparti)	1
Total number of members:	35

Holmestrand kommunestyre 2015–2019
Party name (in Norwegian)	Number of representatives
Labour Party (Arbeiderpartiet)	8
Progress Party (Fremskrittspartiet)	2
Green Party (Miljøpartiet De Grønne)	1
Conservative Party (Høyre)	12
Christian Democratic Party (Kristelig Folkeparti)	1
Centre Party (Senterpartiet)	1
Socialist Left Party (Sosialistisk Venstreparti)	1
Liberal Party (Venstre)	1
Total number of members:	27

Holmestrand kommunestyre 2011–2015
Party name (in Norwegian)	Number of representatives
Labour Party (Arbeiderpartiet)	8
Progress Party (Fremskrittspartiet)	2
Conservative Party (Høyre)	12
Christian Democratic Party (Kristelig Folkeparti)	1
Centre Party (Senterpartiet)	2
Socialist Left Party (Sosialistisk Venstreparti)	1
Liberal Party (Venstre)	1
Total number of members:	27

Holmestrand kommunestyre 2007–2011
Party name (in Norwegian)	Number of representatives
Labour Party (Arbeiderpartiet)	9
Progress Party (Fremskrittspartiet)	3
Conservative Party (Høyre)	6
Centre Party (Senterpartiet)	2
Socialist Left Party (Sosialistisk Venstreparti)	2
Liberal Party (Venstre)	1
Town and local list Holmestrand (By- og bygdelista Holmestrand)	4
Total number of members:	27

Holmestrand kommunestyre 2003–2007
Party name (in Norwegian)	Number of representatives
Labour Party (Arbeiderpartiet)	11
Progress Party (Fremskrittspartiet)	5
Conservative Party (Høyre)	6
Christian Democratic Party (Kristelig Folkeparti)	2
Centre Party (Senterpartiet)	2
Socialist Left Party (Sosialistisk Venstreparti)	4
Liberal Party (Venstre)	1
Town and local list Holmestrand (By- og Bygdelista Holmestrand)	4
Total number of members:	35

Holmestrand kommunestyre 1999–2003
Party name (in Norwegian)	Number of representatives
Labour Party (Arbeiderpartiet)	13
Conservative Party (Høyre)	10
Christian Democratic Party (Kristelig Folkeparti)	3
Centre Party (Senterpartiet)	2
Liberal Party (Venstre)	1
Town and local list Holmestrand (By- og Bygdelista Holmestrand)	6
Total number of members:	35

Holmestrand kommunestyre 1995–1999
Party name (in Norwegian)	Number of representatives
Labour Party (Arbeiderpartiet)	9
Conservative Party (Høyre)	5
Christian Democratic Party (Kristelig Folkeparti)	2
Centre Party (Senterpartiet)	2
Socialist Left Party (Sosialistisk Venstreparti)	1
Town and local list (By- og bygdelista)	16
Total number of members:	35

Holmestrand kommunestyre 1991–1995
Party name (in Norwegian)	Number of representatives
Labour Party (Arbeiderpartiet)	10
Progress Party (Fremskrittspartiet)	1
Conservative Party (Høyre)	8
Christian Democratic Party (Kristelig Folkeparti)	2
Centre Party (Senterpartiet)	3
Socialist Left Party (Sosialistisk Venstreparti)	2
Town and local list (By- og Bygdelista)	9
Total number of members:	35

Holmestrand kommunestyre 1987–1991
Party name (in Norwegian)	Number of representatives
Labour Party (Arbeiderpartiet)	17
Progress Party (Fremskrittspartiet)	5
Conservative Party (Høyre)	8
Christian Democratic Party (Kristelig Folkeparti)	2
Centre Party (Senterpartiet)	1
Socialist Left Party (Sosialistisk Venstreparti)	1
Joint list of the Liberal Party (Venstre) and Liberal People's Party (Liberale Folkepartiet)	1
Total number of members:	35

Holmestrand kommunestyre 1983–1987
Party name (in Norwegian)	Number of representatives
Labour Party (Arbeiderpartiet)	18
Progress Party (Fremskrittspartiet)	1
Conservative Party (Høyre)	9
Christian Democratic Party (Kristelig Folkeparti)	2
Centre Party (Senterpartiet)	2
Socialist Left Party (Sosialistisk Venstreparti)	2
Joint list of the Liberal Party (Venstre) and Liberal People's Party (Liberale Folkepartiet)	1
Total number of members:	35

Holmestrand kommunestyre 1979–1983
Party name (in Norwegian)	Number of representatives
Labour Party (Arbeiderpartiet)	17
Conservative Party (Høyre)	11
Christian Democratic Party (Kristelig Folkeparti)	3
Centre Party (Senterpartiet)	2
Socialist Left Party (Sosialistisk Venstreparti)	1
Joint list of the Liberal Party (Venstre) and New People's Party (Nye Folkepartiet)	1
Total number of members:	35

Holmestrand kommunestyre 1975–1979
Party name (in Norwegian)	Number of representatives
Labour Party (Arbeiderpartiet)	17
Conservative Party (Høyre)	6
Christian Democratic Party (Kristelig Folkeparti)	3
Centre Party (Senterpartiet)	3
Socialist Left Party (Sosialistisk Venstreparti)	1
Joint list of the Liberal Party (Venstre) and New People's Party (Nye Folkepartiet)	1
Total number of members:	31

Holmestrand kommunestyre 1971–1975
Party name (in Norwegian)	Number of representatives
Labour Party (Arbeiderpartiet)	17
Conservative Party (Høyre)	6
Christian Democratic Party (Kristelig Folkeparti)	2
Centre Party (Senterpartiet)	3
Socialist People's Party (Sosialistisk Folkeparti)	2
Liberal Party (Venstre)	1
Total number of members:	31

Holmestrand kommunestyre 1967–1971
Party name (in Norwegian)	Number of representatives
Labour Party (Arbeiderpartiet)	17
Conservative Party (Høyre)	6
Christian Democratic Party (Kristelig Folkeparti)	2
Centre Party (Senterpartiet)	4
Socialist People's Party (Sosialistisk Folkeparti)	1
Liberal Party (Venstre)	1
Total number of members:	31

Holmestrand kommunestyre 1963–1967
Party name (in Norwegian)	Number of representatives
Labour Party (Arbeiderpartiet)	18
Conservative Party (Høyre)	6
Christian Democratic Party (Kristelig Folkeparti)	2
Centre Party (Senterpartiet)	3
Socialist People's Party (Sosialistisk Folkeparti)	1
Liberal Party (Venstre)	1
Total number of members:	31

Holmestrand bystyre 1959–1963
Party name (in Norwegian)	Number of representatives
Labour Party (Arbeiderpartiet)	13
Conservative Party (Høyre)	6
Christian Democratic Party (Kristelig Folkeparti)	2
Total number of members:	21

Holmestrand bystyre 1955–1959
Party name (in Norwegian)	Number of representatives
Labour Party (Arbeiderpartiet)	13
Conservative Party (Høyre)	6
Christian Democratic Party (Kristelig Folkeparti)	2
Total number of members:	21

Holmestrand bystyre 1951–1955
Party name (in Norwegian)	Number of representatives
Labour Party (Arbeiderpartiet)	12
Conservative Party (Høyre)	5
Christian Democratic Party (Kristelig Folkeparti)	3
Total number of members:	20

Holmestrand bystyre 1947–1951
Party name (in Norwegian)	Number of representatives
Labour Party (Arbeiderpartiet)	10
Conservative Party (Høyre)	5
Communist Party (Kommunistiske Parti)	2
Christian Democratic Party (Kristelig Folkeparti)	3
Total number of members:	20

Holmestrand bystyre 1945–1947
Party name (in Norwegian)	Number of representatives
Labour Party (Arbeiderpartiet)	10
Conservative Party (Høyre)	5
Communist Party (Kommunistiske Parti)	2
Christian Democratic Party (Kristelig Folkeparti)	3
Total number of members:	20

Holmestrand bystyre 1937–1940*
Party name (in Norwegian)	Number of representatives
Labour Party (Arbeiderpartiet)	10
Temperance Party (Avholdspartiet)	2
Joint List(s) of Non-Socialist Parties (Borgerlige Felleslister)	8
Total number of members:	20
Note: Due to the German occupation of Norway during World War II, no elections were held for new municipal councils until after the war ended in 1945.

Holmestrand bystyre 1934–1937
Party name (in Norwegian)	Number of representatives
Labour Party (Arbeiderpartiet)	9
Temperance Party (Avholdspartiet)	2
Joint List(s) of Non-Socialist Parties (Borgerlige Felleslister)	8
Local List(s) (Lokale lister)	1
Total number of members:	20

=== Mayors ===
The mayor (Norwegian: ordfører) of Holmestrand Municipality is the political leader of the municipality and the chairperson of the municipal council. The following people have held this position:

- 1838–1838: Christen Backer
- 1838–1838: Nils Ihlen
- 1838–1838: Christen Grønnerup
- 1839–1840: David Christopher Weidemann
- 1841–1844: Christian Blichfeldt
- 1845–1846: Jan Holst
- 1847–1847: Christen Backer
- 1848–1848: David Christopher Weidemann
- 1849–1849: Nils Backer
- 1850–1850: Jan Holst
- 1851–1851: Anders Tønnesen
- 1852–1852: Ole Tollefsen
- 1852–1852: Jan Holst
- 1853–1853: Richard Røed
- 1854–1854: Lauritz Jørgen Olsen
- 1855–1855: Jørgen Hansen Holst
- 1856–1856: Adolf Martin Lund
- 1857–1857: Jan Holst
- 1858–1859: Wilhelm Nielsen
- 1859–1859: Hans Berger
- 1860–1866: Jan Holst
- 1867–1868: Nils Ihlen Hansen
- 1869–1869: Christian Gulbrandsen
- 1870–1875: Nils Ihlen Hansen
- 1876–1876: Knud Andreas Aabel Gjessing
- 1877–1877: Nils Ihlen Hansen
- 1878–1885: Lars Johan Rostad
- 1885–1885: Jens Emanuel Rynning
- 1886–1886: Jacob Pettersen
- 1887–1887: Hans Jørgen Petter Birch
- 1888–1889: Martin Onsager
- 1889–1893: Lars Johan Rostad
- 1894–1894: Jacob Pettersen
- 1895–1895: Hans Jørgen Petter Birch
- 1896–1896: Jacob Pettersen
- 1897–1899: Lars Johan Rostad
- 1900–1900: Gunnar Magnus Kjølstad Graarud (H)
- 1901–1907: Lars Johan Rostad
- 1908–1910: Gunnar Magnus Kjølstad Graarud (H)
- 1911–1916: Einar Wang (H)
- 1917–1919: Sigurd Normann (H)
- 1920–1924: Fredrik Ording (H)
- 1925–1925: Olav Bang
- 1926–1926: Anders Kristensen
- 1927–1927: Sigurd Normann (H)
- 1928–1928: Anders Kristensen
- 1929–1931: Sigurd Normann (H)
- 1932–1932: Anton Knudson
- 1933–1936: Oscar Lagerløv
- 1937–1940: Olaf Abrahamsen
- 1940–1945: Even Norheim (NS)
- 1942–1942: Olaf Borge (NS)
- 1945–1945: Dagfinn Olsen
- 1945–1946: Olaf Abrahamsen (Ap)
- 1946–1963: Karl G. Andersen (Ap)
- 1964–1971: Halfdan Kongsten (Ap)
- 1972–1975: Armand Bjørnholt (Ap)
- 1976–1979: Stener Anker Karlsen (Ap)
- 1980–1991: Manni Jack Nordli (Ap)
- 1992–1999: Olaf Brastad (LL)
- 1999–2003: Johan Svele (H)
- 2003–2007: Gerd M. Monsen (Ap)
- 2007–2019: Alf Johan Svele (H)
- 2020–2023: Elin Weggesrud (Ap)
- 2023–present: Alf Johan Svele (H)

== Transportation ==
The European route E18 highway passes through Vestfold county, following the coastline south from Oslo towards Southern Norway. The highway runs north–south through the municipality passing through Sande i Vestfold and then passing a short distance to the west of the town of Holmestrand. The Vestfoldbanen railway line follows a similar path through Vestfold county as well. It runs through the centre of the town of Holmestrand, stopping at Holmestrand Station.

The Skjeggestad Bridge and the Hanekleiv Tunnel are both part of the E18 highway in Holmestrand.

== Notable people ==
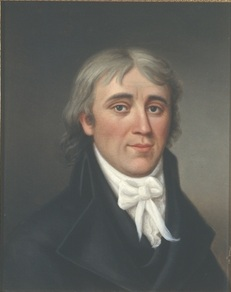
Hans Hein Nysom, painting from 1860

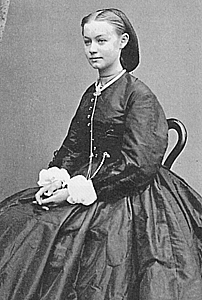
Agathe Backer Grøndahl, 1870

- Hans Hein Nysom (1767–1831), a priest and politician
- Gullik Madsen Røed (1786 in Holmestrand–1857), a soldier and farmer who was a representative at the Norwegian Constituent Assembly
- Wincentz Thurmann Ihlen (1826 in Holmestrand – 1892), an engineer and industrialist
- Morten Müller (1828 at Christianiafjord – 1911), a landscape painter
- Jacob Thurmann Ihlen (1833 in Holmestrand – 1903), a barrister and politician
- Harriet Backer (1845 in Holmestrand – 1932), a painter of detailed interior scenes
- Agathe Backer Grøndahl (1847 in Holmestrand – 1907), a pianist, music teacher, and composer
- Nils Kjær (1870 in Holmestrand – 1924), a playwright, short story writer, and theatre critic
- Signe Heide Steen (1881 in Holmestrand – 1959), an actress
- Øivind Lorentzen (1882 in Holmestrand – 1980), a shipping magnate
- Ragnhild Sundby (1922 in Hof – 2006), a zoologist who specialized in entomology
- Odd Børretzen (1926–2012), an author, illustrator, folk singer, and artist who lived in Holmestrand
- brothers Ulf Lövaas (born 1947) & Dag Lövaas (born 1953), a former motorcycle speedway riders
- Johannes Eick (born 1964 in Eidsfoss), a double bass and electric bass guitar player
- Christine Sagen Helgø (born 1968 in Holmestrand), the mayor of Stavanger from 2011 to 2019
- Runhild Gammelsæter (born 1976 in Holmestrand), a singer and biologist

== International relations ==
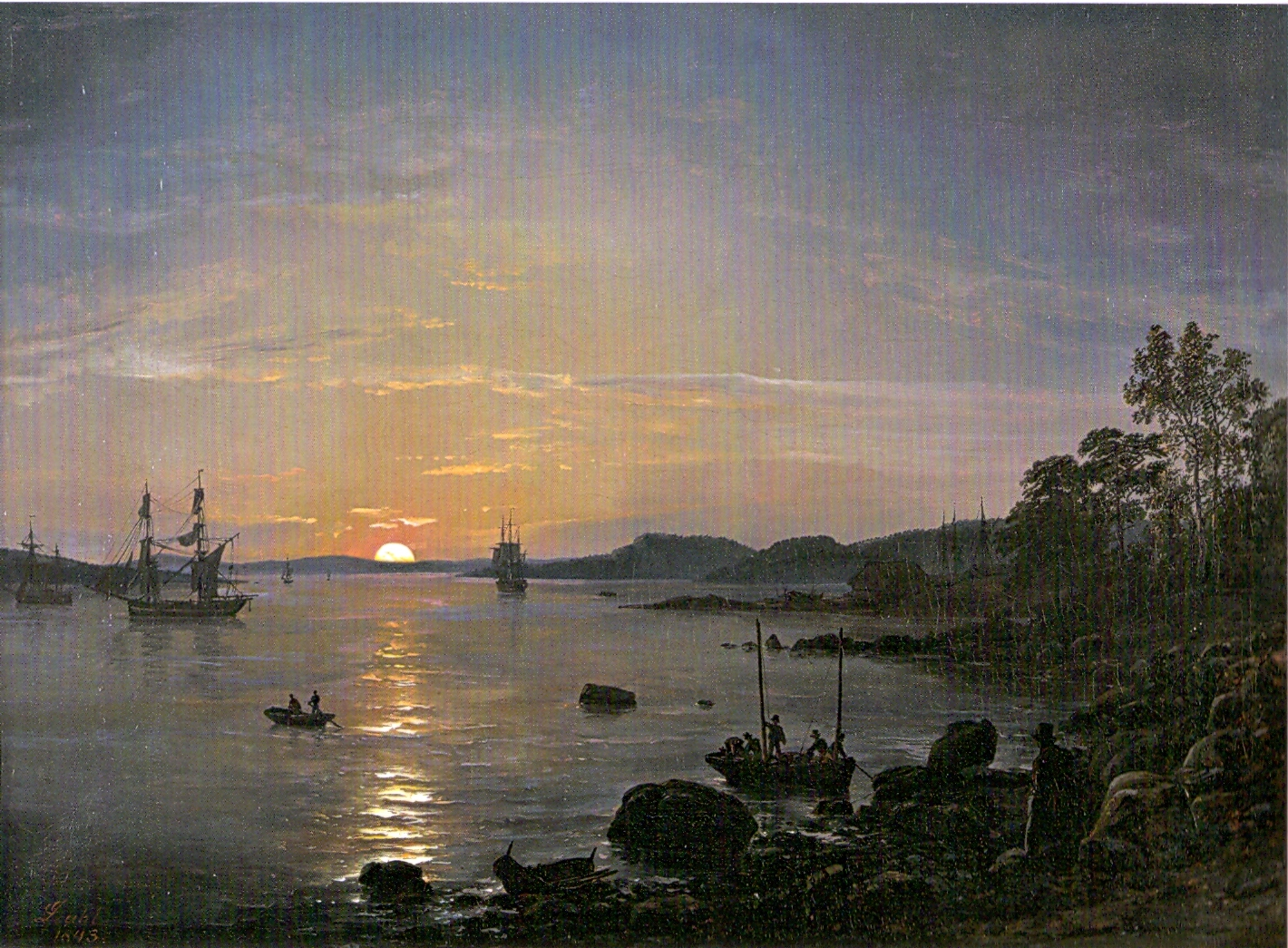
Fjord på Holmestrand Credit: Johan Christian Dahl (1843)

=== Twin towns – Sister cities ===
Holmestrand has sister city agreements with the following places:

- Arsuk, Sermersooq, Greenland
- Åland, Finland
- Eiði, Eysturoy, Faroe Islands
- Herning, Region Midtjylland, Denmark
- Husby, Schleswig-Holstein, Germany
- Kangasala, Western Finland, Finland
- Siglufjörður, Eyjafjörður, Iceland
- Vänersborg, Västra Götaland County, Sweden
