= Einar Wang =

Norwegian politician

Einar Wang (5 November 1855 – 2 March 1939) was a Norwegian politician for the Conservative Party.

Born in Vaale Municipality, he started his career working in a trade company in Tønsberg, from 1871 to 1878. In 1878 he was issued burghership in the city of Holmestrand, and established his own company.

He was a member of the municipal council of Holmestrand Municipality from 1896 to 1901 and 1904 to 1916, serving as mayor from 1910. He also chaired the local commercial association, the school board, the board of the local savings bank and was deputy chairman of the board of the Holmestrand–Vittingfoss Line.

He was elected to the Norwegian Parliament in 1919, representing the constituency of Brevik og Holmestrand. He served only one term.
