= Holmestrand Church =

Church in Vestfold, Norway

- Holmestrand kirke
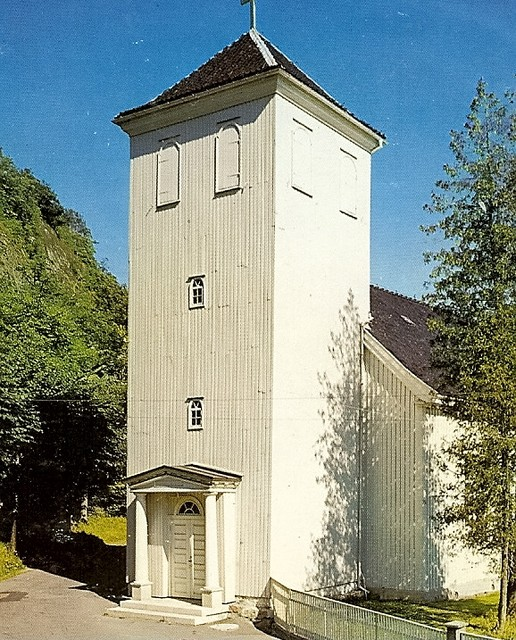
- View of the church
- Holmestrand Church
- 59°29′27″N 10°18′47″E
- Location: Holmestrand Municipality, Vestfold
- Country: Norway
- Denomination: Church of Norway
- Churchmanship: Evangelical Lutheran

History
- Status: Parish church

Architecture
- Functional status: Active
- Architect: Christian Grosch
- Architectural type: Y-shaped
- Completed: 1674 (352 years ago)

Specifications
- Capacity: 300
- Materials: Wood

Administration
- Diocese: Tunsberg
- Deanery: Nord-Jarlsberg prosti
- Parish: Botne
- Norwegian Cultural Heritage Site
- Type: Church
- Status: Automatically protected
- ID: 84609

Holmestrand Church (Norwegian: Holmestrand kirke) is a parish church of the Church of Norway in Holmestrand Municipality in Vestfold county, Norway. It is located in the town of Holmestrand. It is one of the churches for the Botne parish which is part of the Nord-Jarlsberg prosti (deanery) in the Diocese of Tunsberg. The white, wooden church was built in a Y-shaped design in 1674 using plans drawn up by the architect Christian Heinrich Grosch. The church seats about 300 people.

== History ==
In 1663, Holmestrand became a small port under the authority of the town of Tønsberg. Soon after, the people of Holmestrand began asking for their own church. Permission was not granted by King Frederick III, but people kept trying. After the king died in 1670, the people asked for a church once again, and the new King Christian V granted permission. The new church was built in 1674. The new church was given a Y-shaped design. The Y-shape was an alternative to the traditional cruciform design where it could sometimes be difficult to look around the corner of the cross arms to see the altar. The Y-shaped design helped solve the problem, although they were very rare in Norway. It was also built during a time when men and women traditionally sat on opposite sides of the church. In this church, the women sat in the north wing and the men in the south wing, while the chancel was in the east wing. Originally, there was a small bell tower built at the center of the roof. The church remained unpainted until 1764, when it received external cladding and paint as well as a new bell tower at the southwestern entrance.

In 1814, this church served as an election church (Norwegian: valgkirke). Together with more than 300 other parish churches across Norway, it was a polling station for elections to the 1814 Norwegian Constituent Assembly which wrote the Constitution of Norway. This was Norway's first national elections. Each church parish was a constituency that elected people called "electors" who later met together in each county to elect the representatives for the assembly that was to meet at Eidsvoll Manor later that year.

In 1829, the church was in such poor condition that it was uncertain whether to repair it or build a new church. Because of poor financial times, however, the parish could not afford a new building, so a major repair was carried out. The church received new windows and doors, a new church porch, and a new sacristy behind the altar. The church also got a new altarpiece and pulpit.

== Media gallery ==
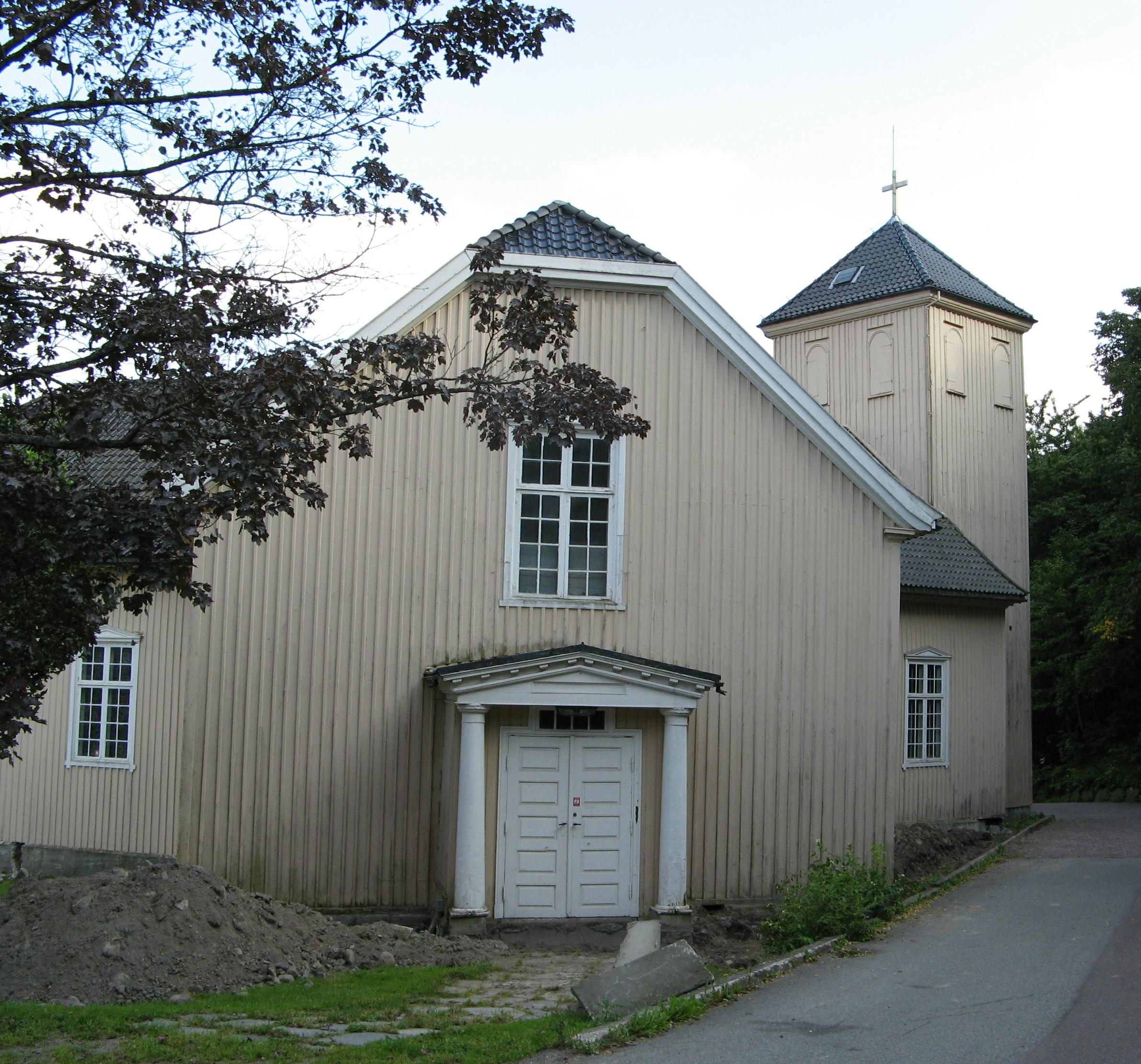

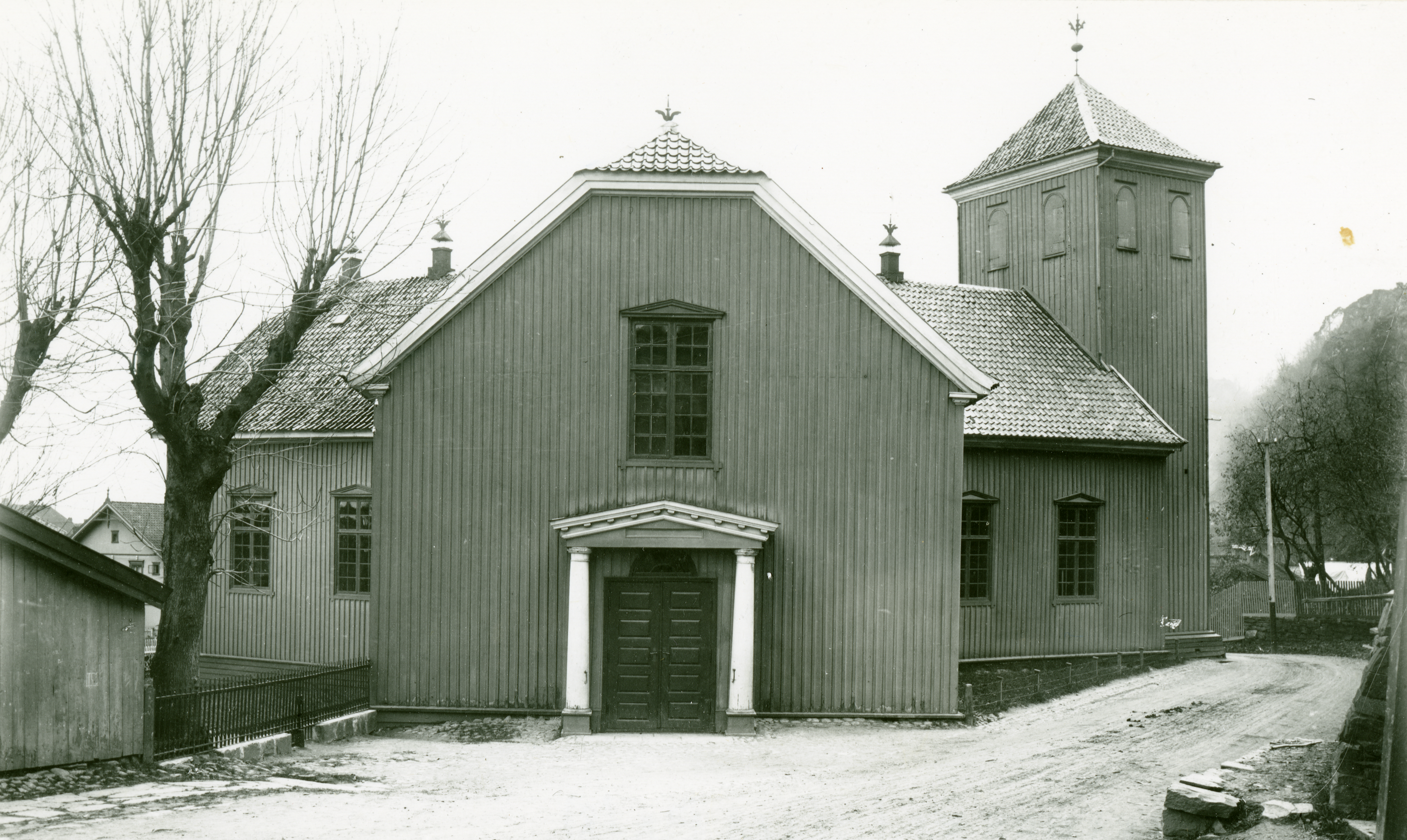

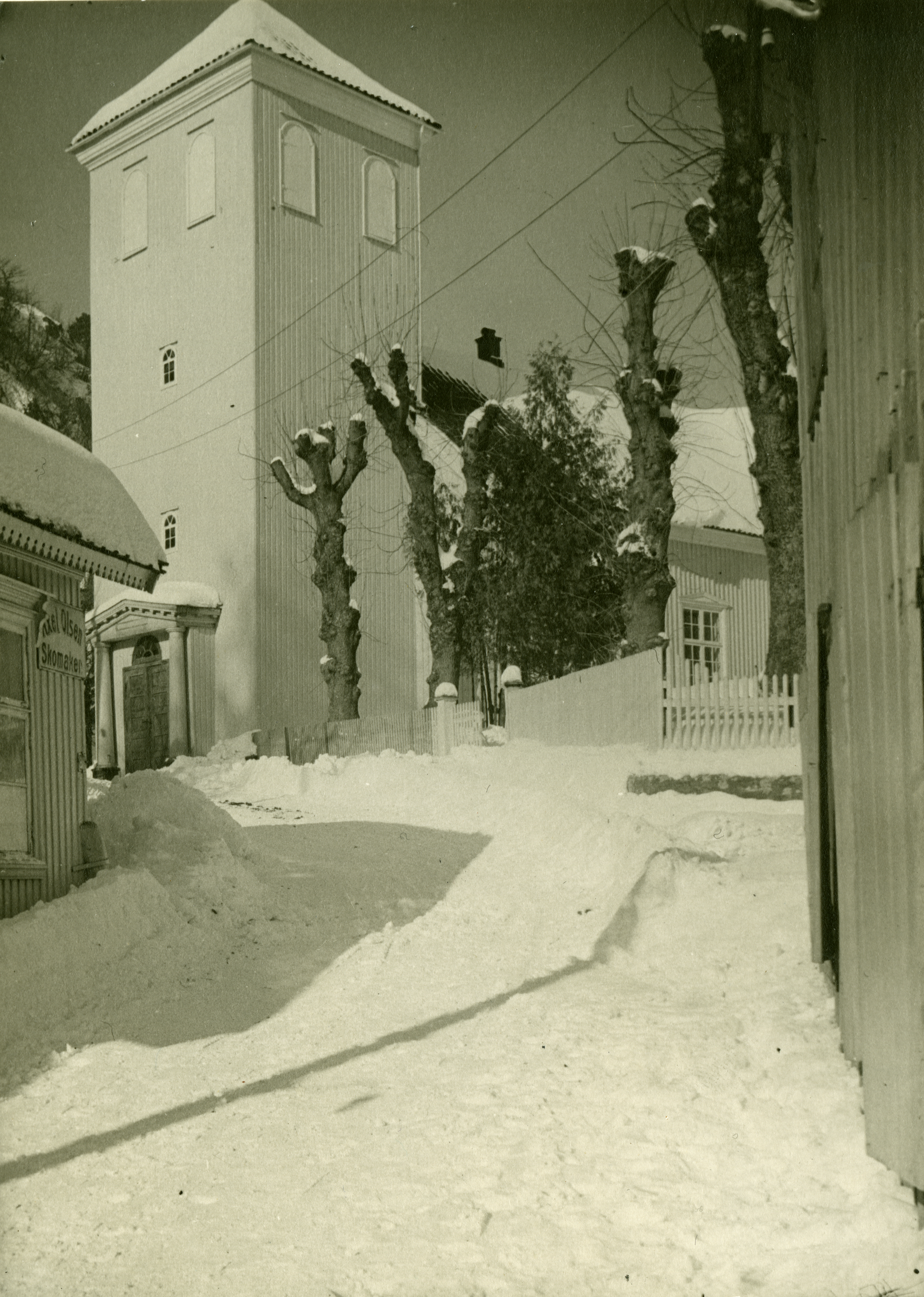

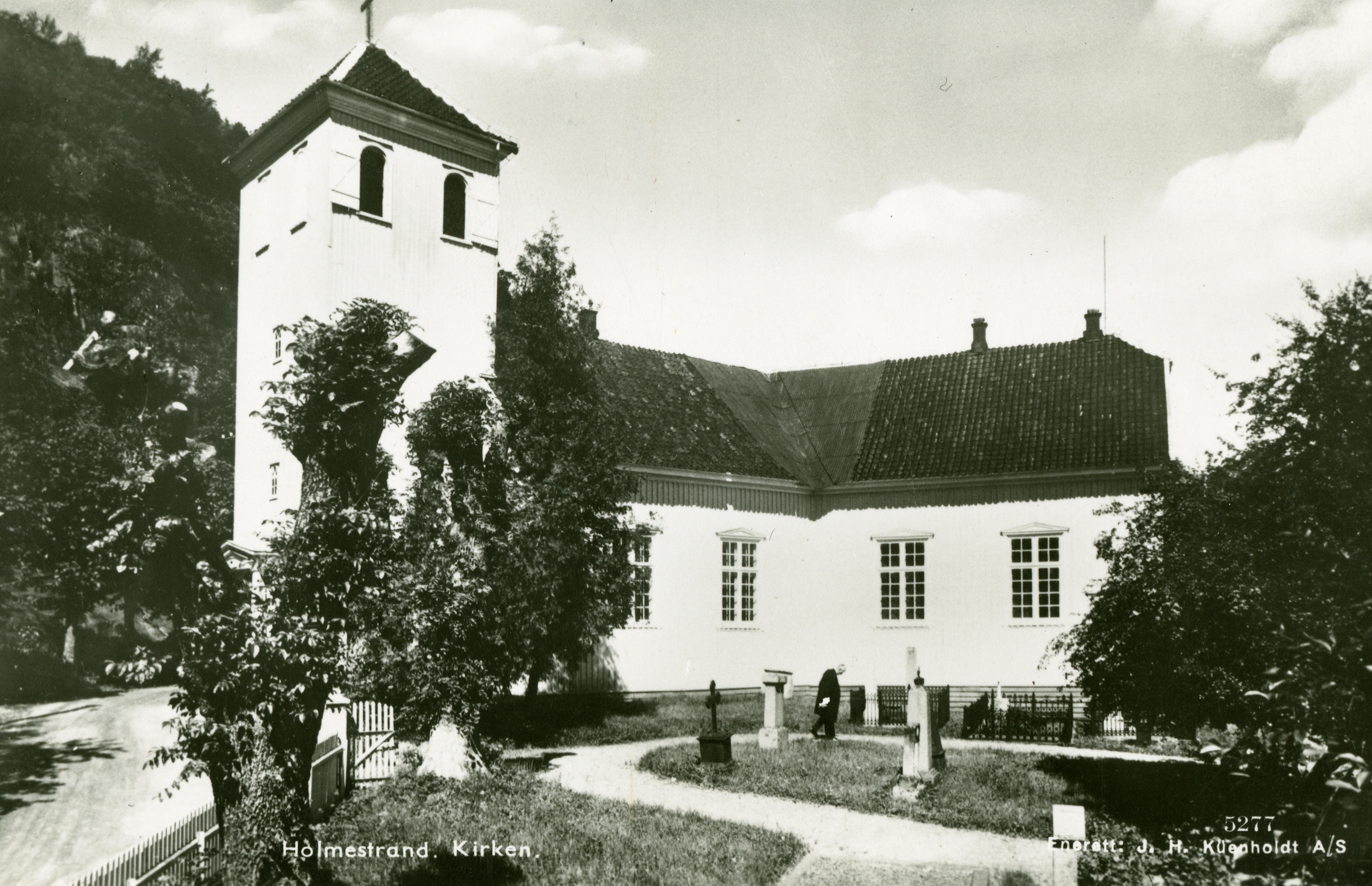

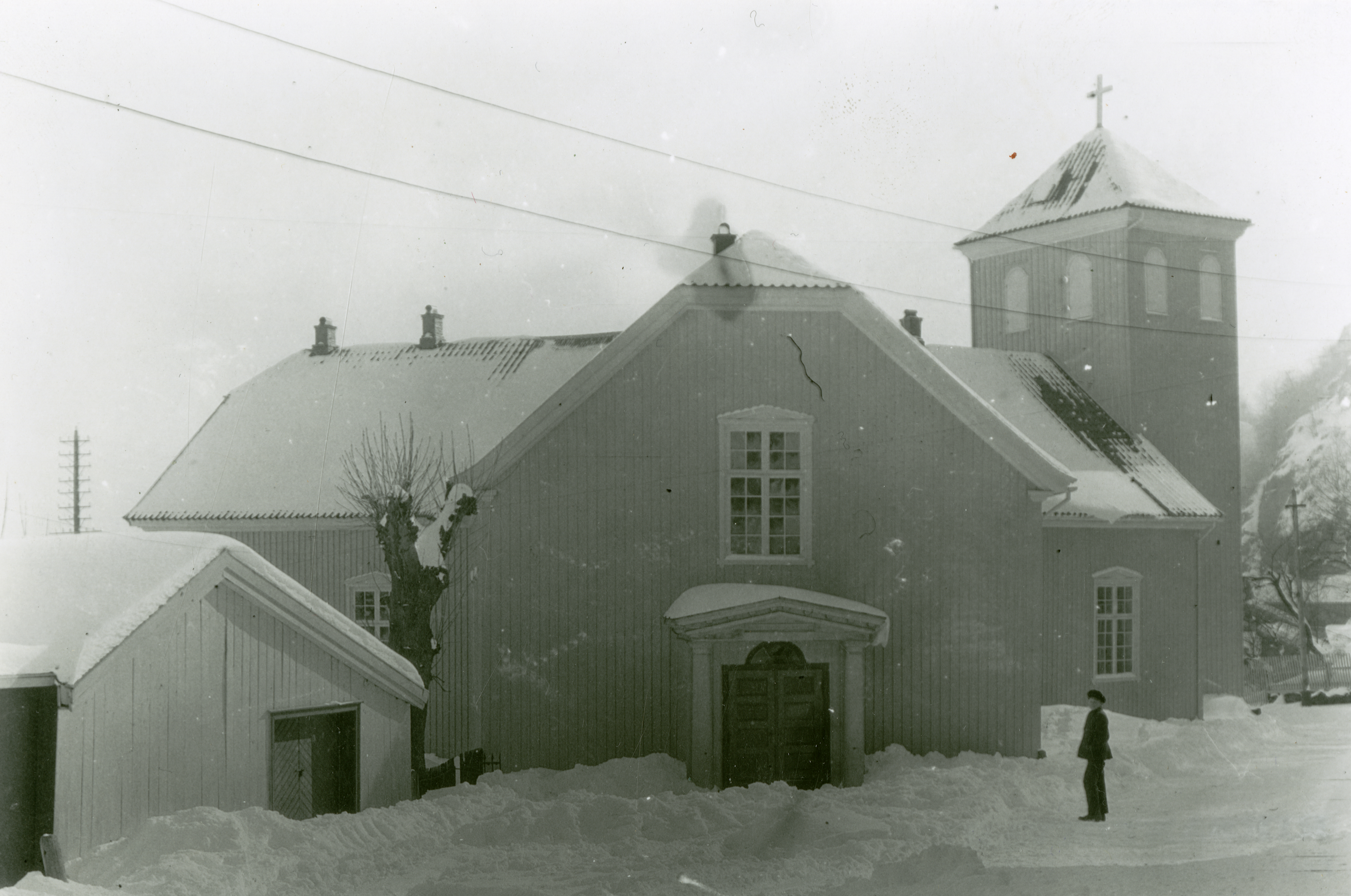

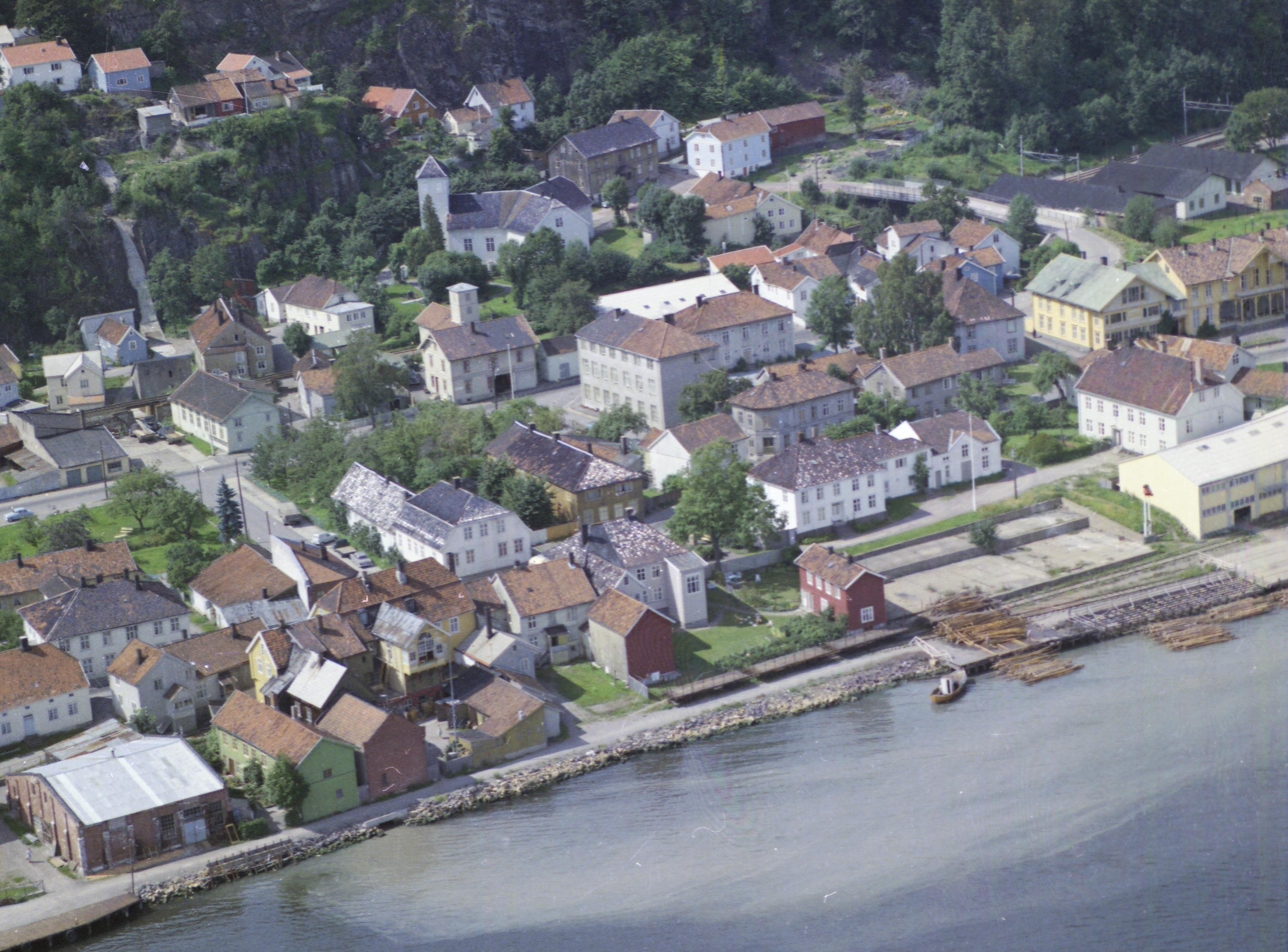

== See also ==
- List of churches in Tunsberg
