= Vassås Church (Vestfold) =

Church in Vestfold, Norway

- Vassås kirke
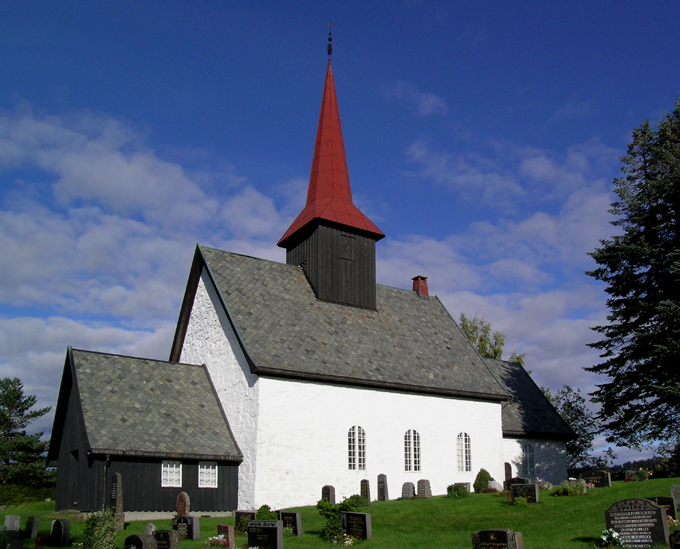
- View of the church
- Vassås Church
- 59°29′06″N 10°05′29″E
- Location: Holmestrand Municipality, Vestfold
- Country: Norway
- Denomination: Church of Norway
- Previous denomination: Catholic Church
- Churchmanship: Evangelical Lutheran

History
- Status: Parish church
- Founded: c. 1200
- Consecrated: c. 1200

Architecture
- Functional status: Active
- Architectural type: Long church
- Completed: c. 1200 (826 years ago)

Specifications
- Capacity: 100
- Materials: Stone

Administration
- Diocese: Tunsberg
- Deanery: Nord-Jarlsberg prosti
- Parish: Hof, Vassås og Eidsfoss
- Norwegian Cultural Heritage Site
- Type: Church
- Status: Automatically protected
- ID: 85779

Vassås Church (Norwegian: Vassås kirke) is a parish church of the Church of Norway in Holmestrand Municipality in Vestfold county, Norway. It is located in the village of Vassås. It is one of the churches for the "Hof, Vassås og Eidsfoss" parish which is part of the Nord-Jarlsberg prosti (deanery) in the Diocese of Tunsberg. The white, stone church was built in a long church design around the year 1200 using plans drawn up by an unknown architect. The church seats about 100 people.

== History ==
The old medieval church was likely built in the late 12th century. The church originally consisted of a rectangular stone nave which had a choir in the same room, rather than a separate room like many other churches. Later, the building was enlarged. During the 17th century, a small church porch was built on the west end of the nave, to serve as a new main entrance to the building. In 1673, the church ownership was transferred from the King to the Count of Jarlsberg. In 1767, the Count sold the church to the local people of the parish for 175 rigsdaler. In 1846, a smaller, rectangular stone chancel was added onto the east end of the nave. At the same time, new second floor seating galleries were added along the west and north walls. In 1903, the church porch was torn down and a new stone church porch was built to replace it. In 1905, the second floor seating gallery on the north wall was removed. In 1983, the church porch was torn down and again replaced with a new wooden church porch.

== Media gallery ==
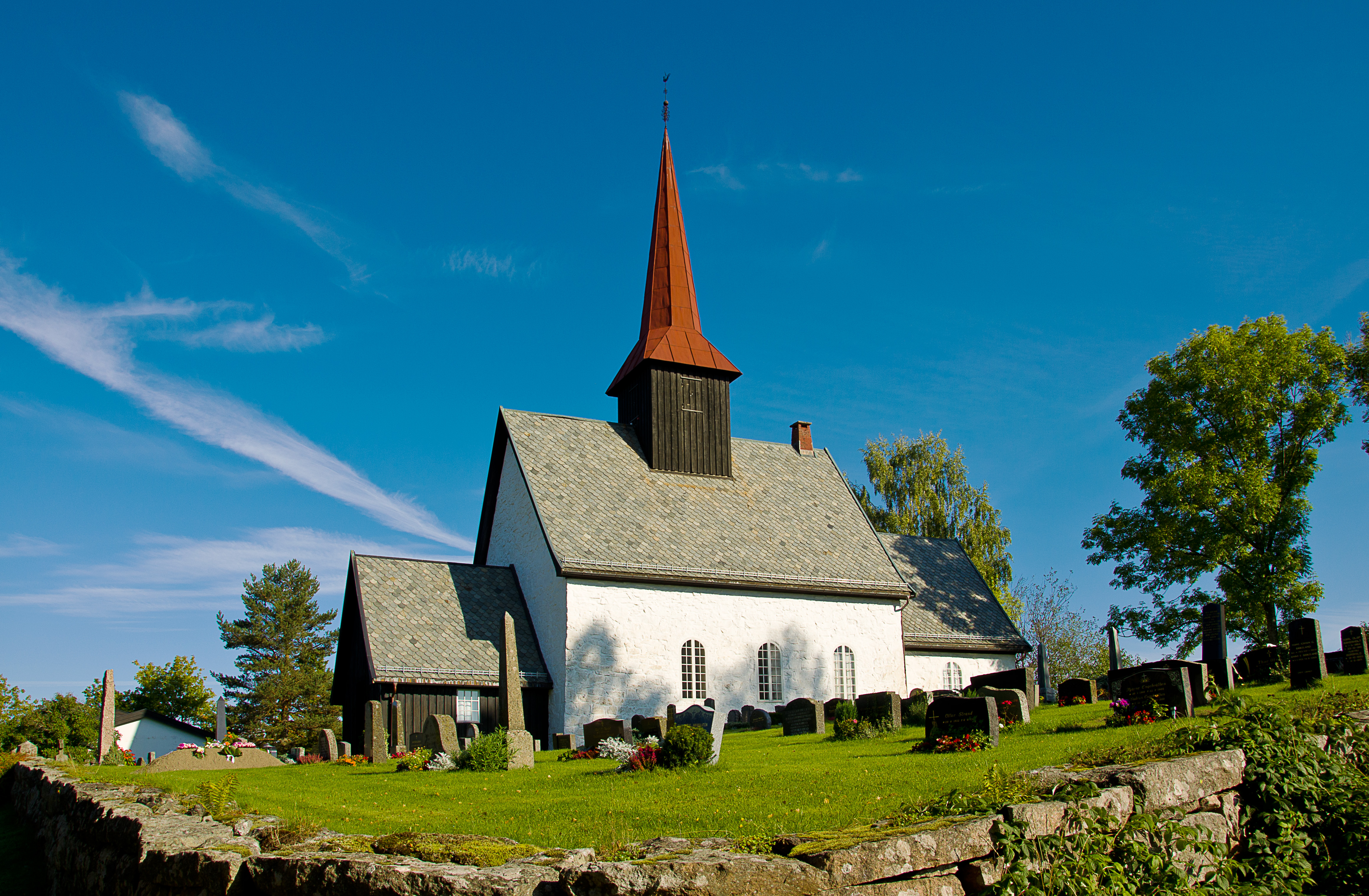

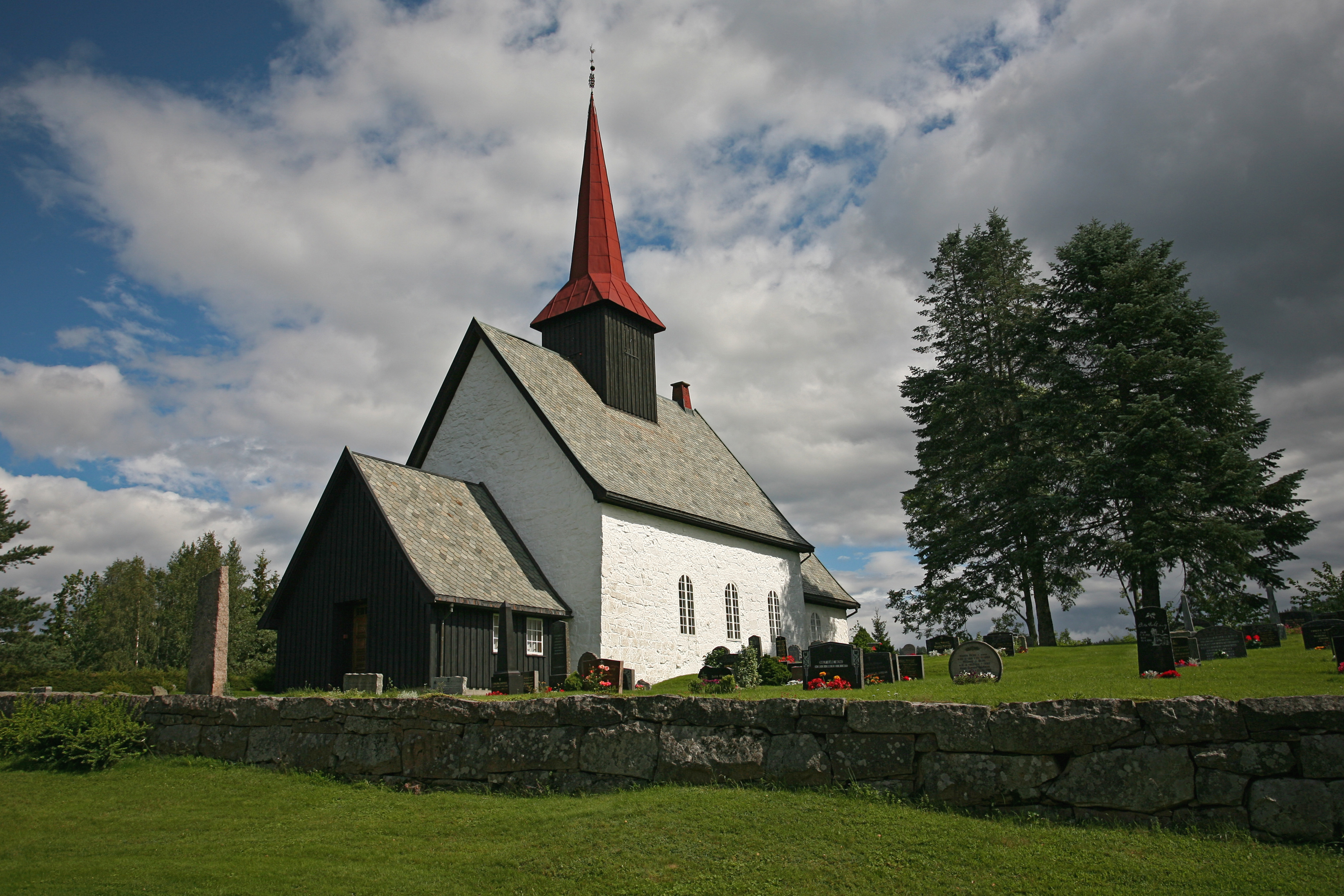

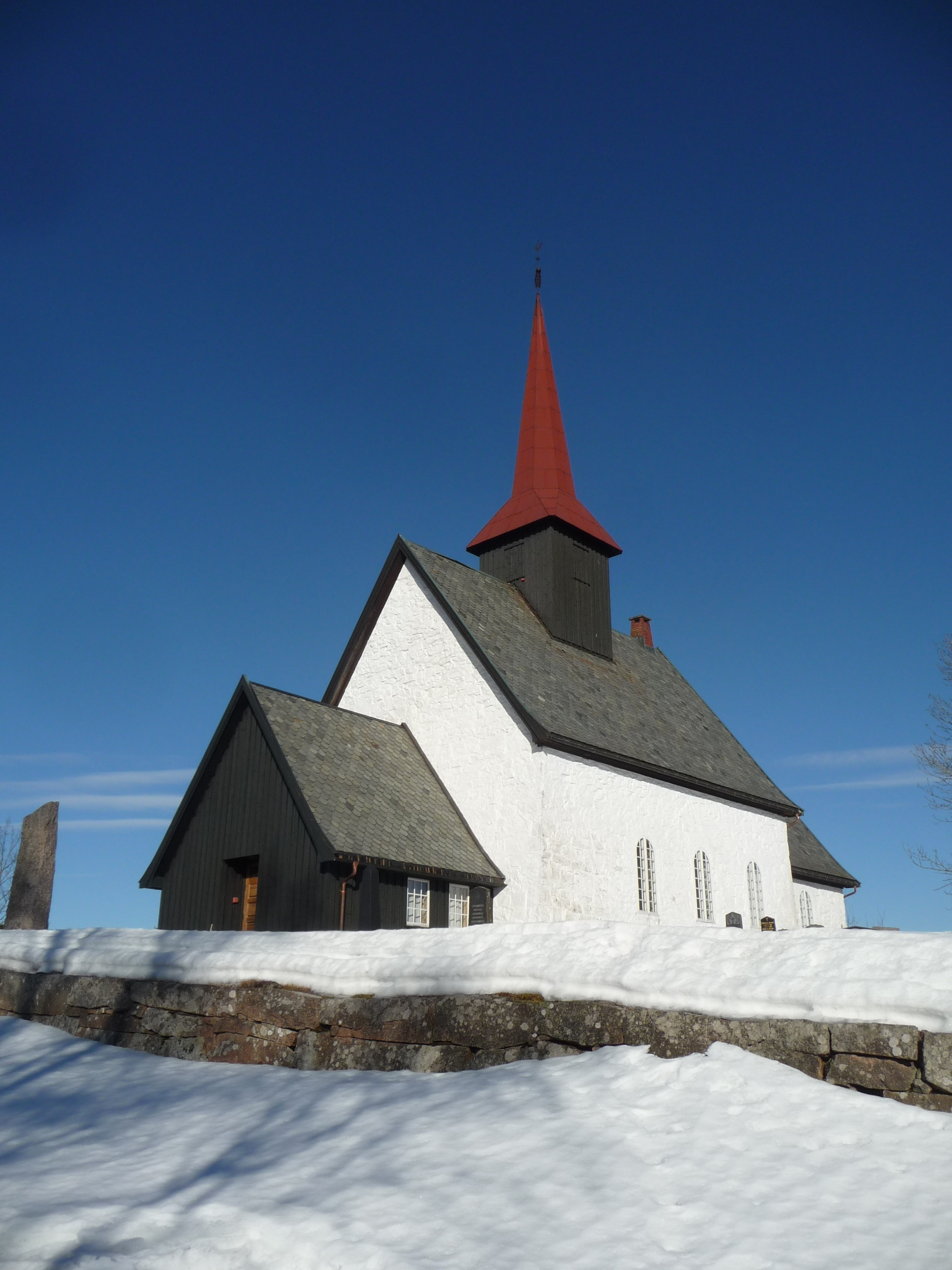

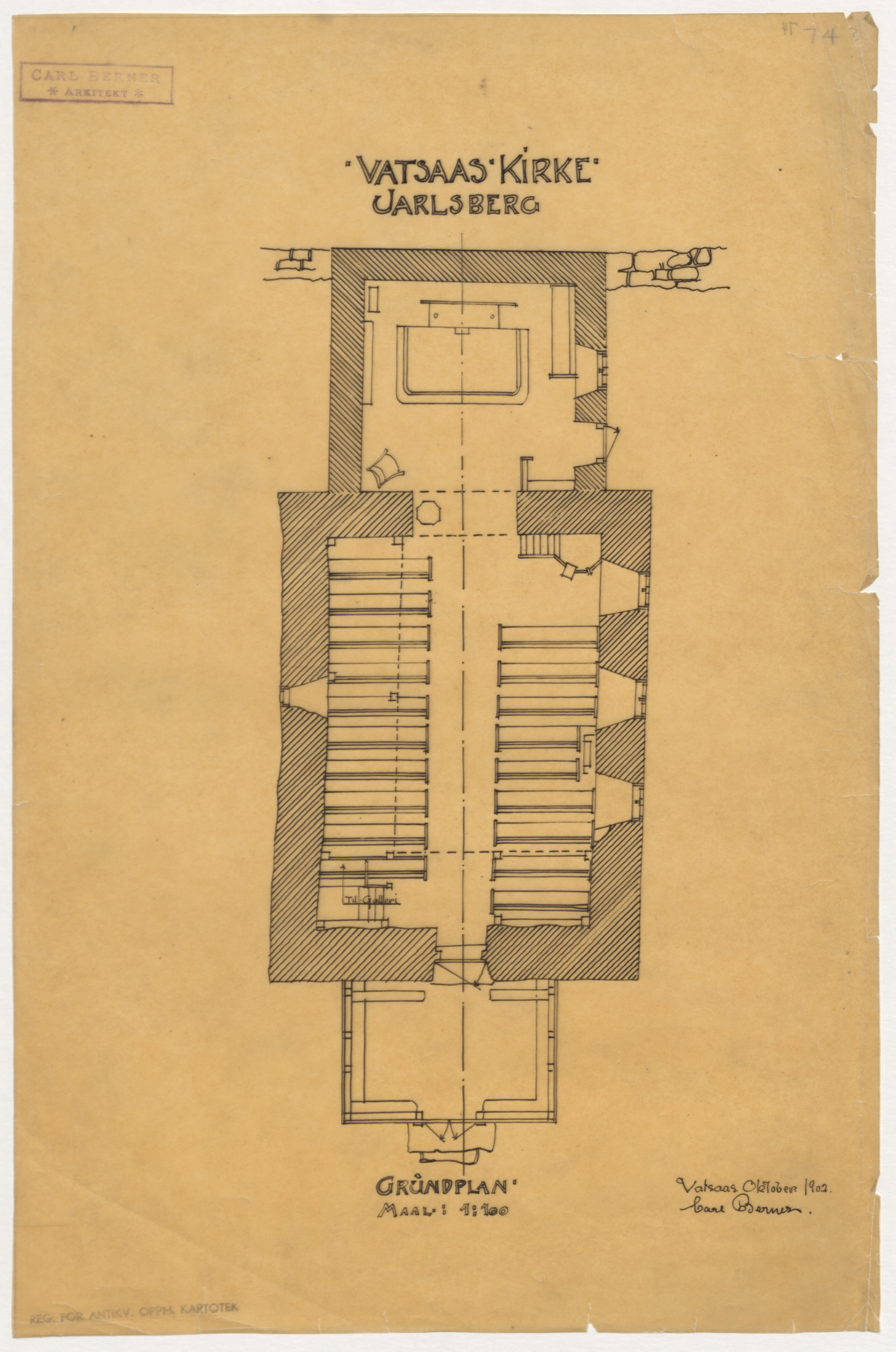

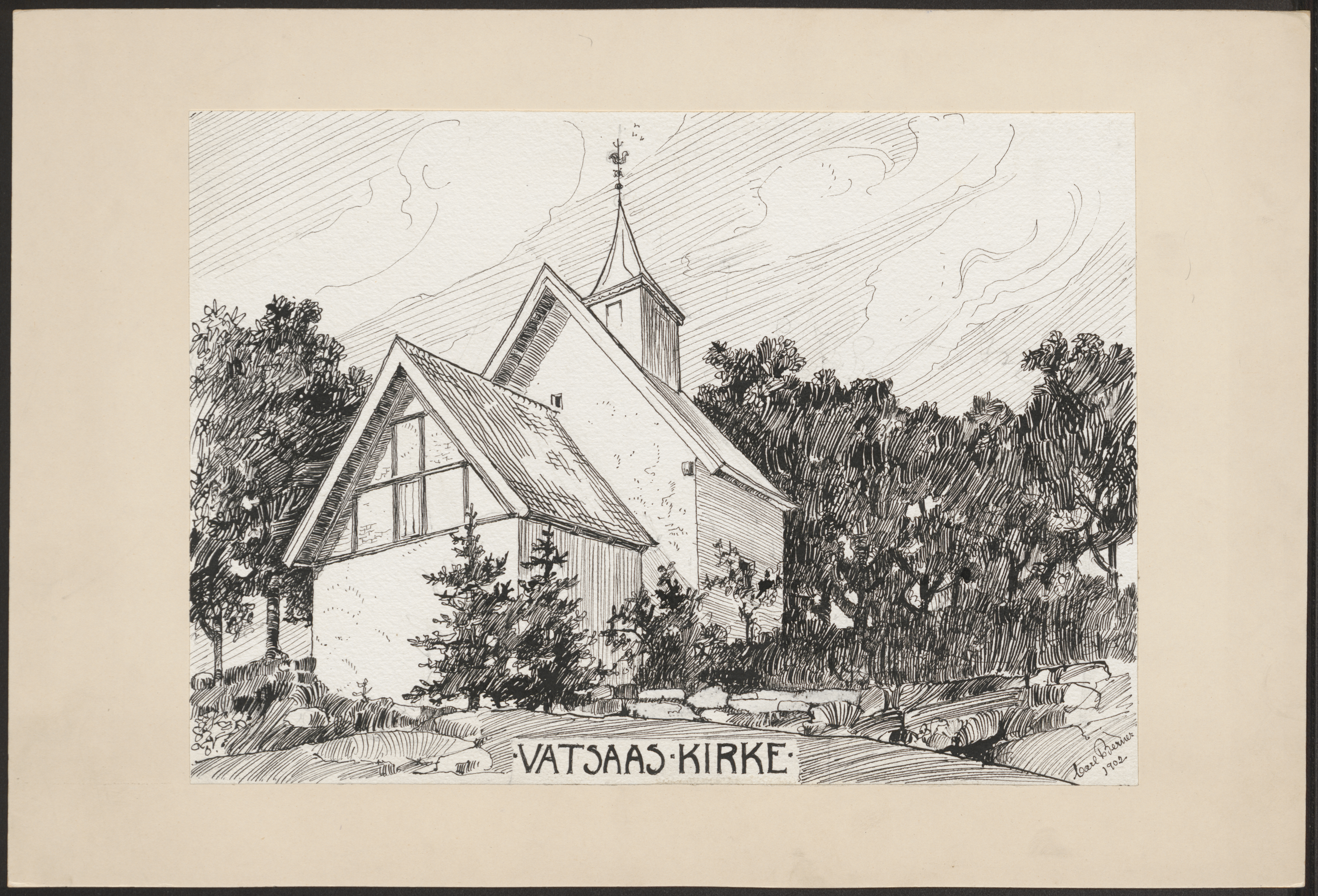

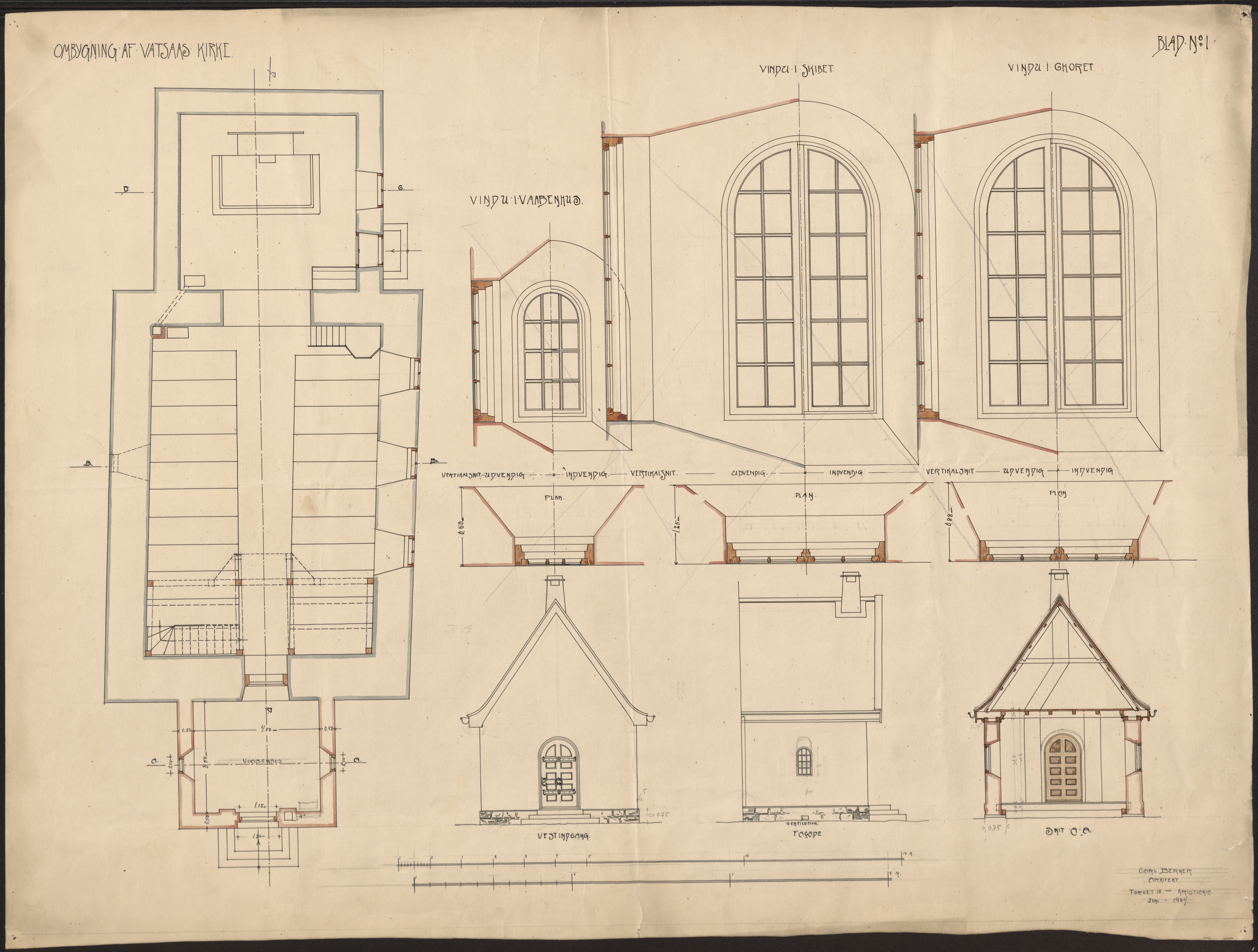

== See also ==
- List of churches in Tunsberg
