= Hillestad Church =

Church in Vestfold, Norway

- Hillestad kirke
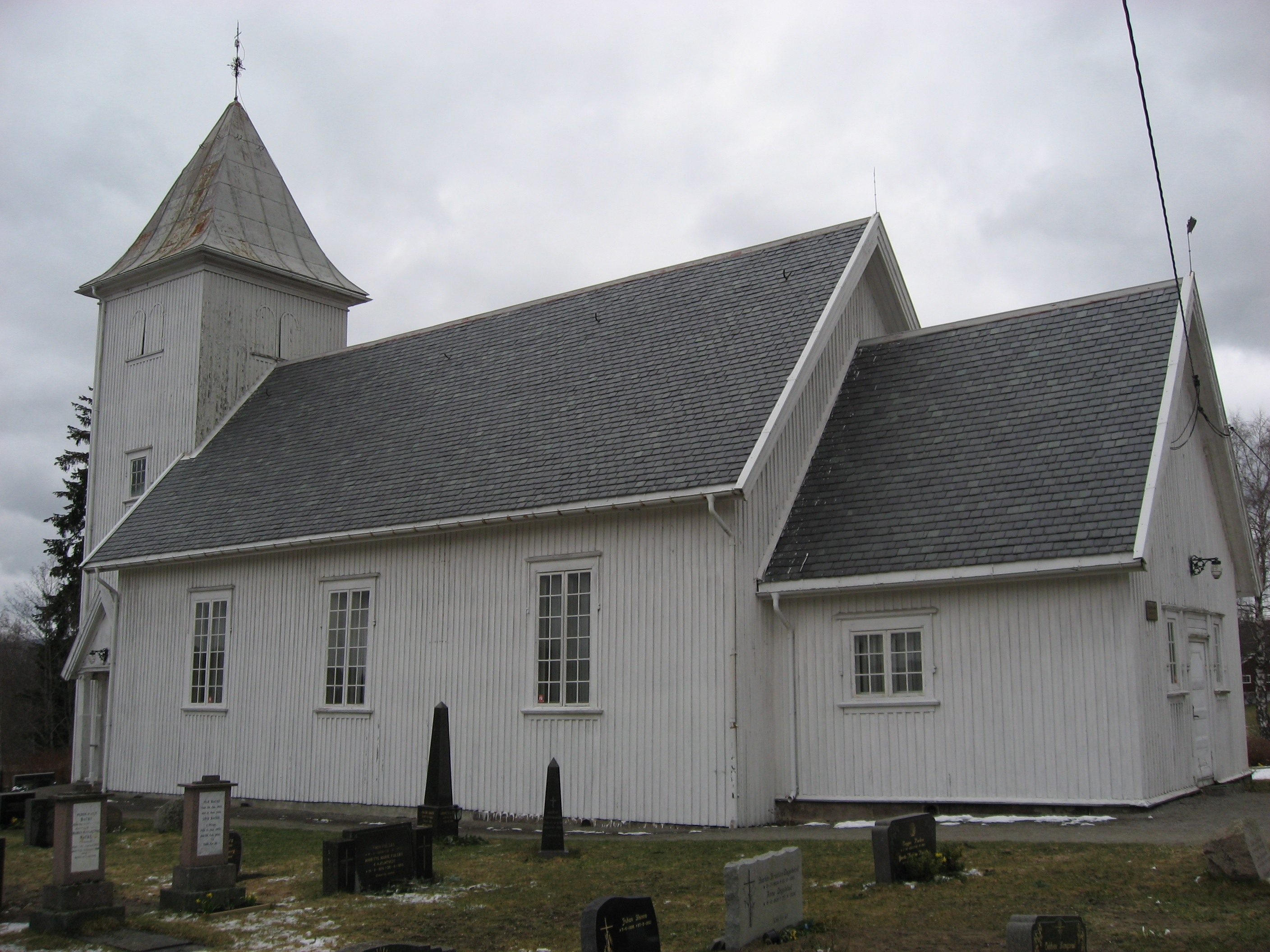
- View of the church
- Hillestad Church
- 59°30′42″N 10°11′05″E
- Location: Holmestrand Municipality, Vestfold
- Country: Norway
- Denomination: Church of Norway
- Previous denomination: Catholic Church
- Churchmanship: Evangelical Lutheran

History
- Status: Parish church
- Founded: 14th century
- Consecrated: 29 Sept 1724

Architecture
- Functional status: Active
- Architectural type: Long church
- Completed: 1724 (302 years ago)

Specifications
- Capacity: 140
- Materials: Wood

Administration
- Diocese: Tunsberg
- Deanery: Nord-Jarlsberg prosti
- Parish: Botne
- Norwegian Cultural Heritage Site
- Type: Church
- Status: Automatically protected
- ID: 84574

Hillestad Church (Norwegian: Hillestad kirke) is a parish church of the Church of Norway in Holmestrand Municipality in Vestfold county, Norway. It is located at Hillestad, about 3 kilometres (1.9 mi) east of the village of Sundbyfoss. It is one of the churches for the Botne parish which is part of the Nord-Jarlsberg prosti (deanery) in the Diocese of Tunsberg. The white, wooden church was built in a long church design in 1724 using plans drawn up by unknown architect. The church seats about 140 people.

== History ==
The earliest existing historical records of the church date back to the year 1390, but the church was not built that year. The first church at Hillestad was likely a wooden stave church that was possibly built during the 13th-century. There is Viking Age burial that was found in the church graveyard, so it has been used for a long time. The first church was dedicated to Saint Margareta. Over the centuries, the church fell into disrepair. In 1724, the Count of Jarlsberg (who owned the church) decided to replace the church. The old church was torn down in May 1724 and a new church was built on the same site. The new wooden church building was designed as a long church. It had a rectangular nave with a chancel that is the same width as the nave. There is a smaller sacristy off the east end of the chancel. On the west end of the nave, there is a church porch with a large bell tower above it. The new church was consecrated on 29 September 1724. In 1911, the church underwent a renovation which included new, larger windows.

== See also ==
- List of churches in Tunsberg
