= Gullik Madsen Røed =

Norwegian soldier and farmer

- Born: 17 February 1786; Botne, Norway
- Died: 9 August 1857 (aged 71)
- Occupations: farmer and soldier
- Known for: representative at the Norwegian Constitutional Assembly

Gullik Madsen Røed (17 February 1786 – 9 August 1857) was a Norwegian soldier and farmer. He served as a representative at the Norwegian Constitutional Assembly during 1814.

Gullik Madsen Røed was born at the farm Rød in Botne prestegjeld near Holmestrand in Vestfold, Norway where his father was a farmer. Around 1812, he took over the farm Bo in Sande prestegjeld in Vestfold. He was also commander in the Sandeske Company of Telemark Infantry Regiment (Telemarkske infanteriregiment).

He represented Telemark Regiment at the Norwegian Constituent Assembly at Eidsvoll Manor in 1814. There he joined the independence party (Selvstendighetspartiet). He was later elected to represent Jarlsberg and Larvik in the Norwegian Parliament in 1836 and served with the Parliament from 1836 to 1837. He was a member of the committee on military affairs. ( In 1813, he married Maren Bentsdatter Bøe (1791-1874) Together they were the parents of eight children,

== Related Reading ==
- Holme Jørn (2014) De kom fra alle kanter - Eidsvollsmennene og deres hus (Oslo: Cappelen Damm) ISBN 978-82-02-44564-5
