= Hans Hein Nysom =

Norwegian politician

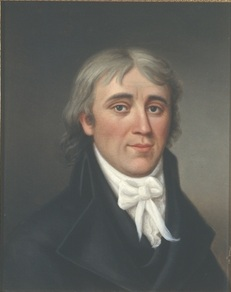
Hans Hein Nysom (painting by P. Meidell from 1860)

Hans Hein Nysom (4 February 1767 – 29 January 1831) was a Norwegian priest and politician.

Hans Hein Nysom was born in the community of Bragernes of the city of Drammen. He was the son of a local merchant. In 1787, he earned his theological degree at the University of Copenhagen.

In 1788, he was appointed chaplain under the priest in Eiker. In 1799, he became priest at Våle Church in Vestfold. He worked as a vicar in Botne Church near Holmestrand in Vestfold from 1802. He married Elisabeth Sophie Neumann, whose family was active in the management of Hassel Ironworks (Hassel jernverk) at Skotselv in Eiker. They were the parents of ten children and grandparents of the Director-General of the Norwegian State Railways System, Hans Hein Theodor Nysom.

He was elected to the Norwegian Constituent Assembly at Eidsvoll Manor in 1814, representing the city of Holmestrand. He left politics after this. In memory of his participation at Eidsvoll, a monument honoring him was raised in Holmestrand during 1914.
