= Holmestrand Aluminium Museum =

Museum in Norway

Coordinates: 59.4874°N 10.3202°E

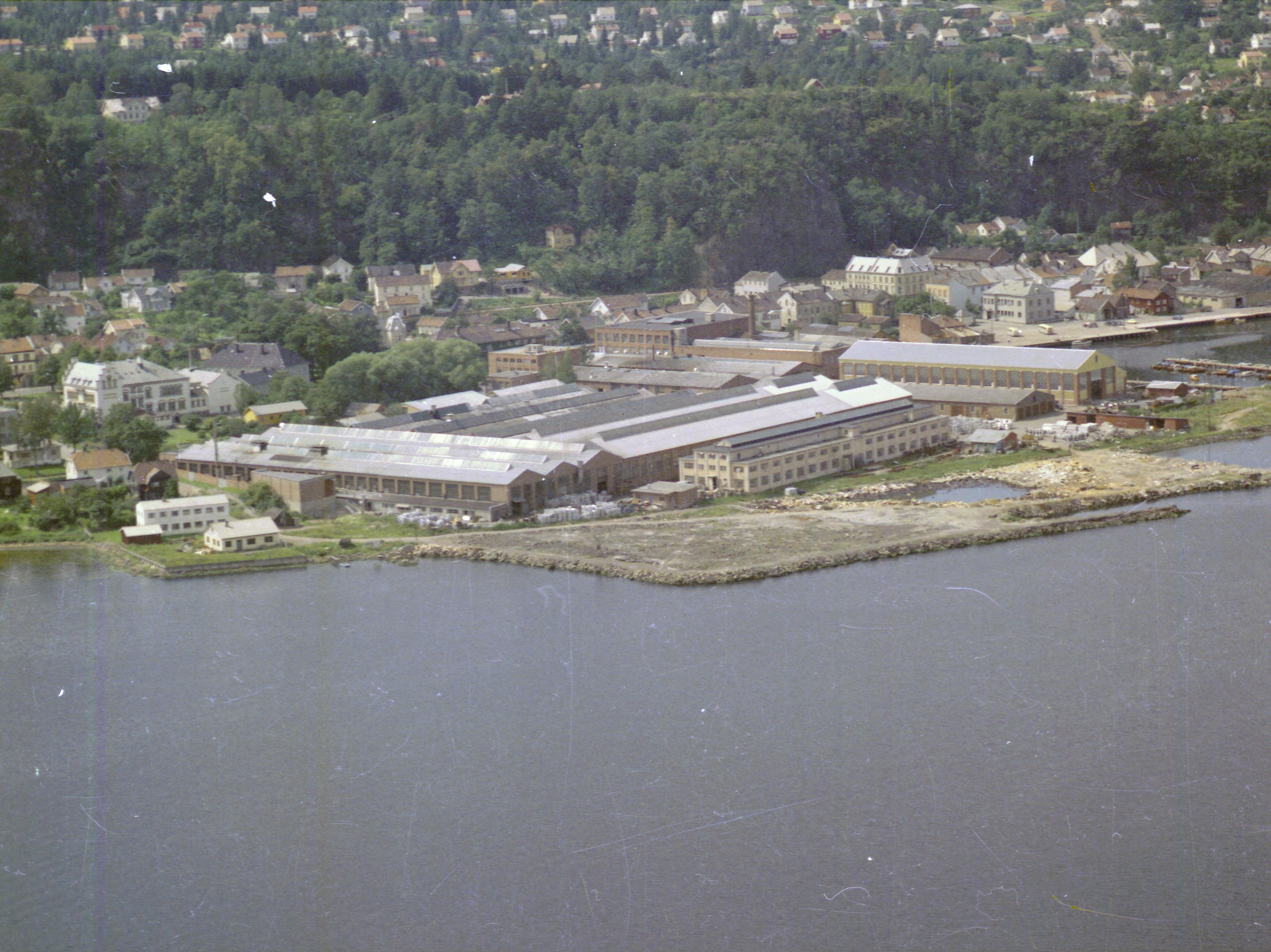
Nordic Aluminium Industry at Holmestrand

Holmestrand Aluminium Museum (Aluminiummuseet i Holmestrand) is located in a former factory of Hydro Aluminium AS in the centre of Holmestrand in Vestfold, Norway.

== Museum ==
=== Display ===
Holmestrand Aluminium Museum is a part of Vestfold Museum (Vestfoldmuseene) and opened in 2000.

The Aluminium Museum displays the history of aluminium processing in Holmestrand since the foundation of A/S Nordic Aluminium Industry in 1917. Production commenced in 1919 and is still in full operation. The rolling mill came to form the major and dominant part of the business in Holmestrand. Under the trade name Høyang, the company produced a wide range of goods, the best known being cookware including pans, coffee pots and pressure cookers. New items are constantly added, such as a 3-tonne piece of industrial machinery.

In the winter of 2009–10 the museum was the site of a multidisciplinary educational programme for all ninth-year students in northern Vestfold.

Norway's Digital Museum houses an online selection, mostly of cookware, from the Holmestrand Aluminium Museum.

=== Visiting ===
The museum is open daily except Mondays in the summer season. It opens Tuesdays and Thursdays all year, and also on Sundays from mid-April to October. Guided tours are available. The museum also houses the Holmestrand tourist information bureau, and has hosted an exhibit of photographs of the local mountain.
