= Holmestrand =

Town in Vestfold, Norway

- Town/City
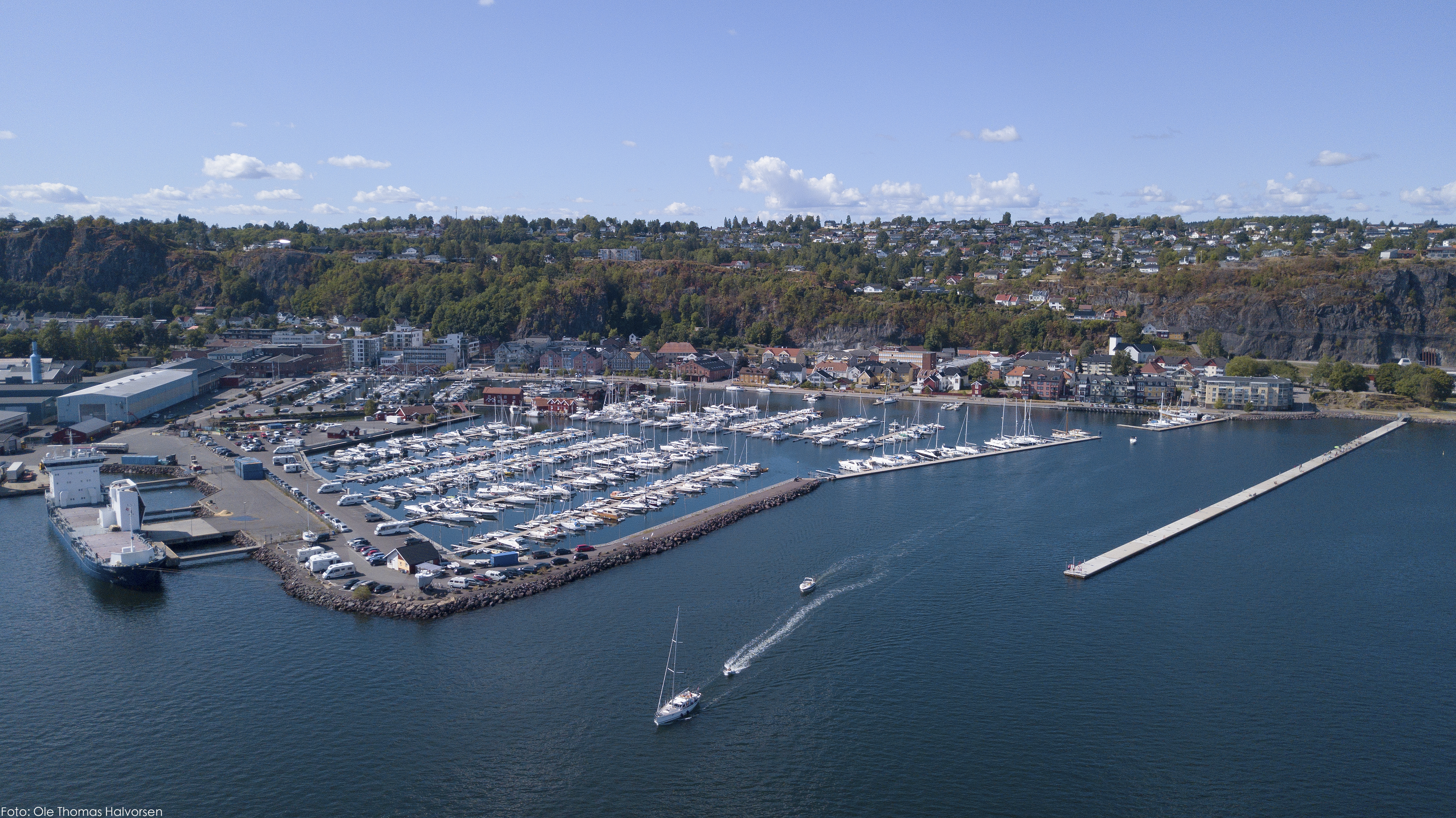
- View of the town harbour
- Nickname(s): Byen under fjellet (lit. 'The town beneath the hills')
- Interactive map of Holmestrand
- Coordinates: 59.48761°N 10.31758°E
- Country: Norway
- Region: Eastern Norway
- County: Vestfold
- District: Jarlsberg
- Municipality: Holmestrand Municipality
- Established as
- Ladested: 1744
- Kjøpstad: 1752

Area
  - Total: 4.58 km^{2} (1.77 sq mi)
- Elevation: 3 m (9.8 ft)

Population (2026)
  - Total: 8,643
  - Density: 1,887/km^{2} (4,890/sq mi)
- Demonym: Holmestranding
- Time zone: UTC+01:00 (CET)
  - Summer (DST): UTC+02:00 (CEST)
- Post Code: 3080 Holmestrand

Holmestrand (pronounced [¹hɔlməstrɑn]; locally [¹hɔlməʂʈrɑn]) is a town in Holmestrand Municipality in Vestfold county, Norway. The town is the administrative centre of the municipality. It is located along the shore of the Ytre Oslofjord, about 13 kilometres (8.1 mi) northwest of the town of Horten and about 12 kilometres (7.5 mi) south of the village of Sande i Vestfold. The large town of Drammen lies about 30 kilometres (19 mi) to the north.

The 4.58-square-kilometre (1,130-acre) town has a population (2026) of 8,643 and a population density of 1,887 inhabitants per square kilometre (4,890/sq mi).

== History ==
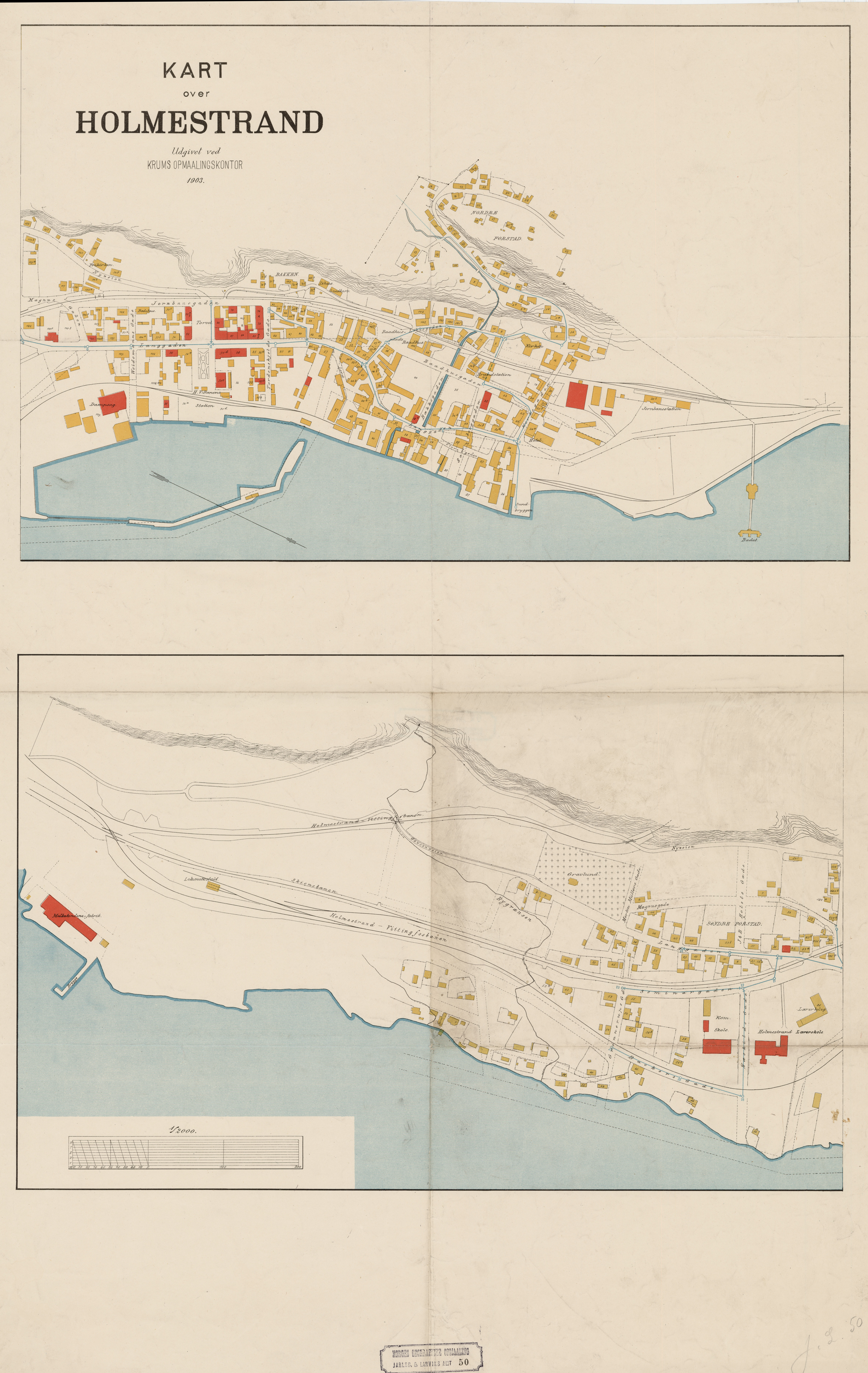
Map of the town in 1903

Located around the Oslofjord, Holmestrand developed as a timber/lumber port starting around 1550, when the Dutch came here for timber. In 1663, the place became a customs office under the nearby city of Tønsberg. In 1716, the northern part of Holmestrand was reduced to ashes after a large fire spread through the area. In 1744, King Christian VI designated it a ladested. In 1752, the new King Frederik V granted it kjøpstad (town) status. In the era of sailing ships, the town had a period of prosperity, but when the transition to steamships it was left in a backwater as a shipping town. In the 19th century, the town was known for its medical spas. In 1838, the new formannskapsdistrikt law gave the small town self-governing municipality status as Holmestrand Municipality. The Vestfoldbanen Railway, which was opened in 1881, led to a lot of new business. In 1884, the entire southern part of the town burned down after another fire. In 1902, after the opening of the Holmestrand–Vittingfoss railway, Holmestrand became the shipping port for wood pulp from Hvittingfoss in what is now Kongsberg Municipality. The track was closed in 1938.

A factory for aluminum processing was built just south of the city in 1917. In 1967, the company became part of Årdal og Sunndal Verk (ÅSV), which was later acquired by Norsk Hydro in 1986. The factory made aluminum products, including under the well-known Høyang brand, using aluminum from Høyanger. The Holmestrand Aluminium Museum is now located in the city, celebrating the history of this industry in Holmestrand.

=== Name ===
The town is named Holmestrand (Old Norse: Holmastrand). The first element is the genitive case of the word holmi which means "rocky islet". The last element is strand which means "shore" or "beach". This is likely referring to three small islets that were located just offshore where the town is now located. The islets are no longer visible due to infilled land reclamation efforts.

== Government ==
In Norway, municipalities are the unit of local government. This means that cities and towns are simply designations for urban areas, but under current Norwegian law, they have no actual government authority. The city of Holmestrand lies within Holmestrand Municipality and is therefore governed by the municipal council of Holmestrand Municipality.

== Transportation ==
The European route E18 highway is the main north–south road through Vestfold county. It runs just to the west of the town of Holmestrand and secondary roads connect the city centre to this highway. The Vestfoldbanen railway line runs through the centre of Holmestrand, and the city is served by the Holmestrand Station.

== See also ==
- List of towns and cities in Norway
