= 2017 Doha Diamond League =

- Dates: 5 May 2017
- Host city: Doha, Qatar
- Venue: Suheim bin Hamad Stadium
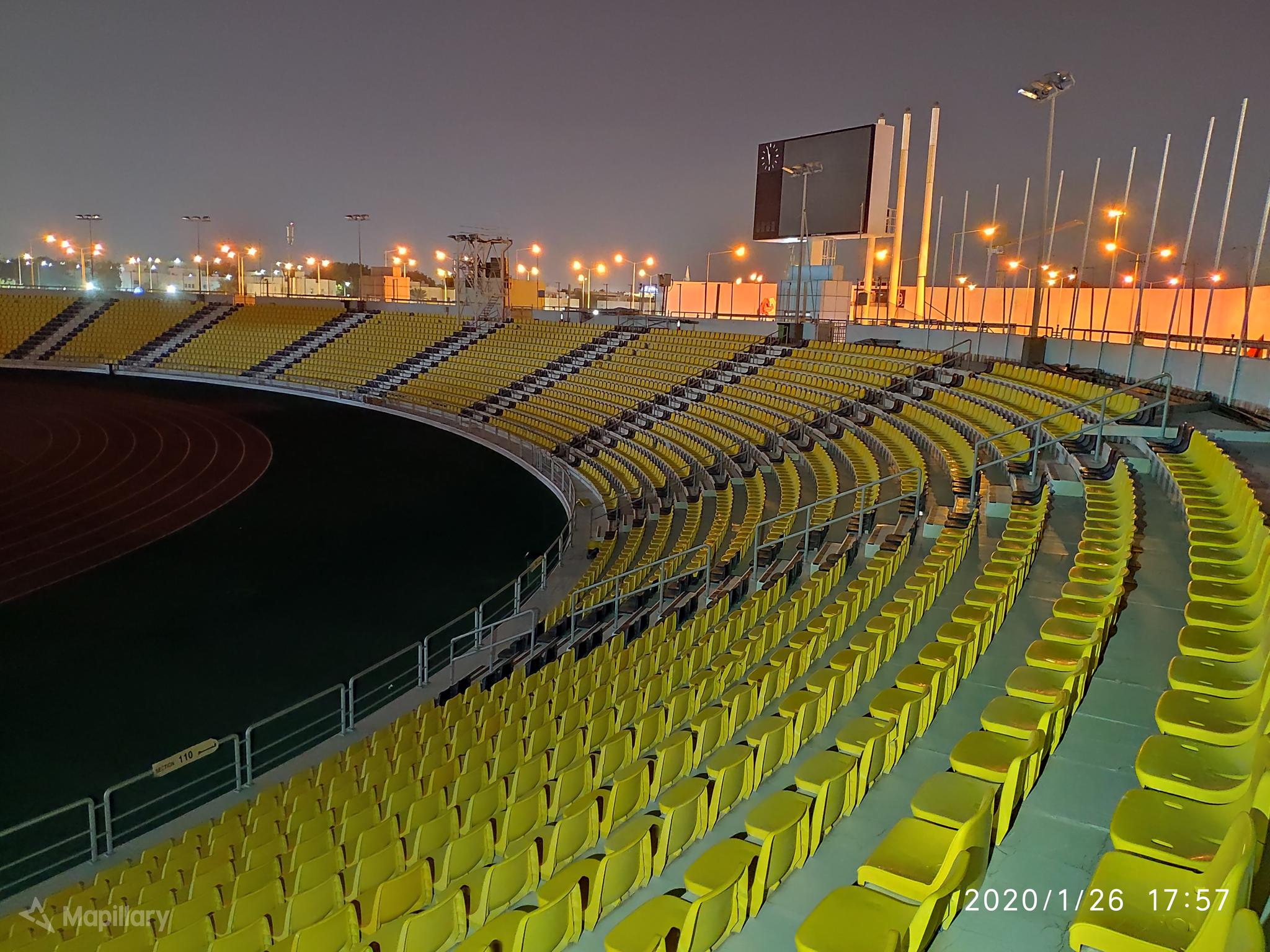
- Level: 2017 Diamond League

The 2017 Doha Diamond League was the 19th edition of the annual outdoor track and field meeting in Doha, Qatar. Held on 5 May at Suheim bin Hamad Stadium, it was the opening leg of the 2017 Diamond League – the highest level international track and field circuit.

== Diamond discipline results ==
In 2017 a completely new system was introduced; the top eight athletes at each meeting were awarded points (8–7–6–5–4–3–2–1), but these points only determined which athletes qualified for the discipline finals in Zürich and Brussels. Athletes no longer became Diamond League champion due to being top of the leaderboard after the final but through winning the disciplines final event during the Diamond League Finals.

=== Men's ===
100 Metres
Rank	Athlete	Nation	Time	Points	Notes
1st place, gold medalist(s)	Akani Simbine	South Africa	9.99	8	
2nd place, silver medalist(s)	Asafa Powell	Jamaica	10.08	7	SB
3rd place, bronze medalist(s)	Femi Ogunode	Qatar	10.13	6	=SB
4	Justin Gatlin	United States	10.14	5	SB
5	Andre De Grasse	Canada	10.21 [.203]	4	SB
6	Ben Youssef Meïté	Ivory Coast	10.21 [.209]	3	SB
7	Ronnie Baker	United States	10.24	2	
8	Kim Collins	Saint Kitts and Nevis	10.33	1	
			Wind: (−1.2 m/s)		

400 Metres
Rank	Athlete	Nation	Time	Points	Notes
1st place, gold medalist(s)	Steven Gardiner	Bahamas	44.60	8	
2nd place, silver medalist(s)	LaShawn Merritt	United States	44.78	7	SB
3rd place, bronze medalist(s)	Tony McQuay	United States	44.92	6	SB
4	Karabo Sibanda	Botswana	45.05	5	SB
5	Vernon Norwood	United States	45.41	4	
6	Luguelín Santos	Dominican Republic	45.55	3	
7	Pavel Maslák	Czech Republic	45.59	2	SB
8	Liemarvin Bonevacia	Netherlands	45.95	1	

1500 Metres
Rank	Athlete	Nation	Time	Points	Notes
1st place, gold medalist(s)	Elijah Manangoi	Kenya	3:31.90	8	WL
2nd place, silver medalist(s)	Silas Kiplagat	Kenya	3:32.23	7	SB
3rd place, bronze medalist(s)	Bethwell Birgen	Kenya	3:32.27	6	SB
4	Vincent Kibet	Kenya	3:32.66	5	SB
5	Timothy Cheruiyot	Kenya	3:32.87	4	
6	Robert Biwott	Kenya	3:34.30	3	SB
7	Ryan Gregson	Australia	3:34.56	2	SB
8	Aman Wote	Ethiopia	3:34.81	1	SB
9	Jakub Holuša	Czech Republic	3:36.16		SB
10	Said Aden	Qatar	3:37.42		PB
11	Ayanleh Souleiman	Djibouti	3:40.81		SB
12	Dawit Wolde	Ethiopia	3:41.20		SB
13	Ben Blankenship	United States	3:42.20		SB
—	Andrew Kiptoo Rotich	Kenya	DNF		PM
—	Jackson Kivuva	Kenya	DNF		PM

3000 Metres
Rank	Athlete	Nation	Time	Points	Notes
1st place, gold medalist(s)	Ronald Kwemoi	Kenya	7:28.73	8	WL
2nd place, silver medalist(s)	Paul Chelimo	United States	7:31.57	7	PB
3rd place, bronze medalist(s)	Yomif Kejelcha	Ethiopia	7:32.27	6	SB
4	Caleb Ndiku	Kenya	7:33.36	5	SB
5	Albert Rop	Bahrain	7:38.30	4	SB
6	Muktar Edris	Ethiopia	7:40.97	3	SB
7	Jacob Kiplimo	Uganda	7:43.73	2	PB
8	Andrew Butchart	Great Britain	7:45.36	1	SB
9	Tariq Al-Amri	Saudi Arabia	7:46.72		SB
10	Ben True	United States	7:47.00		SB
11	Edwin Soi	Kenya	7:48.12		SB
12	Conseslus Kipruto	Kenya	7:49.00		SB
13	Hayle Ibrahimov	Azerbaijan	7:49.75		SB
14	Birhanu Balew	Bahrain	7:52.98		SB
—	Thomas Longosiwa	Kenya	DNF		
—	Collins Cheboi	Kenya	DNF		PM
—	Tamás Kazi	Hungary	DNF		PM

High jump
Rank	Athlete	Nation	Height	Points	Notes
1st place, gold medalist(s)	Mutaz Barsham	Qatar	2.36 m	8	WL
2nd place, silver medalist(s)	Robbie Grabarz	Great Britain	2.31 m	7	SB
3rd place, bronze medalist(s)	Donald Thomas	Bahamas	2.29 m	6	SB
4	Majd Eddin Ghazal	Syria	2.29 m	5	
5	Luis Castro	Puerto Rico	2.26 m	4	SB
6	Erik Kynard	United States	2.26 m	3	SB
7	Chris Baker	Great Britain	2.26 m	2	SB
8	Andriy Protsenko	Ukraine	2.26 m	1	SB
9	Mickaël Hanany	France	2.23 m		SB
10	Nuh Andu	Eritrea	2.15 m		=SB
11	Hamdi Ali	Qatar	2.10 m		

Triple jump
Rank	Athlete	Nation	Distance	Points	Notes
1st place, gold medalist(s)	Christian Taylor	United States	17.25 m (−0.4 m/s)	8	
2nd place, silver medalist(s)	Omar Craddock	United States	17.08 m (−1.5 m/s)	7	SB
3rd place, bronze medalist(s)	Alexis Copello	Azerbaijan	16.81 m (−0.3 m/s)	6	SB
4	Dong Bin	China	16.76 m (−1.4 m/s)	5	
5	Troy Doris	Guyana	16.58 m (−1.6 m/s)	4	SB
6	Jhon Murillo	Colombia	16.40 m (−0.6 m/s)	3	
7	Karol Hoffmann	Poland	16.13 m (−1.9 m/s)	2	SB
8	Rashid Al-Mannai	Qatar	15.52 m (−1.6 m/s)	1	SB
9	Renjith Maheshwary	India	14.77 m (−2.1 m/s)		SB

Javelin throw
Rank	Athlete	Nation	Distance	Points	Notes
1st place, gold medalist(s)	Thomas Röhler	Germany	93.90 m	8	DLR, MR, WL
2nd place, silver medalist(s)	Johannes Vetter	Germany	89.68 m	7	PB
3rd place, bronze medalist(s)	Jakub Vadlejch	Czech Republic	87.91 m	6	SB
4	Tero Pitkämäki	Finland	84.26 m	5	SB
5	Ahmed Bader Magour	Qatar	83.18 m	4	SB
6	Hamish Peacock	Australia	82.97 m	3	
7	Julius Yego	Kenya	81.94 m	2	SB
8	Kim Amb	Sweden	80.85 m	1	SB
9	Ryohei Arai	Japan	74.68 m		
10	Mohamad Mohd Kaida	Qatar	65.11 m		

=== Women's ===
200 Metres
Rank	Athlete	Nation	Time	Points	Notes
1st place, gold medalist(s)	Elaine Thompson-Herah	Jamaica	22.19	8	SB
2nd place, silver medalist(s)	Dafne Schippers	Netherlands	22.45	7	
3rd place, bronze medalist(s)	Marie Josée Ta Lou-Smith	Ivory Coast	22.77	6	SB
4	Simone Facey	Jamaica	23.00	5	SB
5	Veronica Campbell Brown	Jamaica	23.09	4	
6	Blessing Okagbare	Nigeria	23.15	3	
7	Desirèe Henry	Great Britain	23.22	2	
8	Joanna Atkins	United States	23.32	1	
			Wind: (−2.3 m/s)		

800 Metres
Rank	Athlete	Nation	Time	Points	Notes
1st place, gold medalist(s)	Caster Semenya	South Africa	1:56.61	8	MR, WL
2nd place, silver medalist(s)	Margaret Wambui	Kenya	1:57.03	7	SB
3rd place, bronze medalist(s)	Eunice Sum	Kenya	1:58.76	6	SB
4	Habitam Alemu	Ethiopia	1:58.92	5	PB
5	Genzebe Dibaba	Ethiopia	1:59.37	4	SB
6	Charlene Lipsey	United States	2:00.29	3	PB
7	Malika Akkaoui	Morocco	2:01.13	2	SB
8	Natoya Goule-Toppin	Jamaica	2:01.59	1	SB
9	Joanna Jóźwik	Poland	2:05.68		SB
—	Jenny Meadows	Great Britain	DNF		PM

100 Metres hurdles
Rank	Athlete	Nation	Time	Points	Notes
1st place, gold medalist(s)	Kendra Harrison	United States	12.59	8	
2nd place, silver medalist(s)	Cindy Roleder	Germany	12.90	7	SB
3rd place, bronze medalist(s)	Sharika Nelvis	United States	12.91	6	
4	Christina Clemons	United States	13.05	5	
5	Megan Tapper	Jamaica	13.13	4	
6	Phylicia George	Canada	13.14	3	
7	Cindy Sember	Great Britain	13.42	2	
8	Nia Ali	United States	14.34	1	SB
			Wind: (−2.3 m/s)		

3000 Metres steeplechase
Rank	Athlete	Nation	Time	Points	Notes
1st place, gold medalist(s)	Hyvin Jepkemoi	Kenya	9:00.12	8	MR, WL
2nd place, silver medalist(s)	Beatrice Chepkoech	Kenya	9:01.57	7	PB
3rd place, bronze medalist(s)	Ruth Jebet	Bahrain	9:01.99	6	SB
4	Celliphine Chespol	Kenya	9:05.70	5	WU20R
5	Emma Coburn	United States	9:14.53	4	SB
6	Sofia Assefa	Ethiopia	9:15.66	3	SB
7	Gesa Felicitas Krause	Germany	9:15.70	2	NR
8	Aisha Praught-Leer	Jamaica	9:19.29	1	NR
9	Habiba Ghribi	Tunisia	9:27.97		SB
10	Stephanie Garcia	United States	9:30.43		SB
11	Purity Cherotich Kirui	Kenya	9:31.73		SB
12	Colleen Quigley	United States	9:33.13		SB
13	Genevieve Gregson	Australia	9:37.10		SB
14	Charlotta Fougberg	Sweden	9:42.14		SB
15	Tigest Getent	Bahrain	9:46.35		SB
16	Courtney Frerichs	United States	9:54.91		SB
—	Caroline Chepkurui	Kenya	DNF		PM
—	Ann Gathoni	Kenya	DNF		PM

Pole vault
Rank	Athlete	Nation	Height	Points	Notes
1st place, gold medalist(s)	Katerina Stefanidi	Greece	4.80 m	8	SB
2nd place, silver medalist(s)	Sandi Morris	United States	4.75 m	7	SB
3rd place, bronze medalist(s)	Yarisley Silva	Cuba	4.65 m	6	SB
4	Holly Bradshaw	Great Britain	4.55 m	5	SB
5	Lisa Ryzih	Germany	4.55 m	4	SB
6	Katie Moon	United States	4.45 m	3	SB
7	Alysha Newman	Canada	4.25 m	2	
7	Kristen Brown	United States	4.25 m	2	
—	Megan Clark	United States	NM		
—	Nicole Büchler	Switzerland	NM		

Shot put
Rank	Athlete	Nation	Distance	Points	Notes
1st place, gold medalist(s)	Michelle Carter	United States	19.32 m	8	SB
2nd place, silver medalist(s)	Anita Márton	Hungary	18.99 m	7	
3rd place, bronze medalist(s)	Aliona Dubitskaya	Belarus	18.90 m	6	SB
4	Yuliya Leantsiuk	Belarus	18.22 m	5	SB
5	Cleopatra Borel	Trinidad and Tobago	17.96 m	4	SB
6	Brittany Smith	United States	17.84 m	3	
7	Noora Salem Jasim	Bahrain	17.69 m	2	NR
8	Melissa Boekelman	Netherlands	17.43 m	1	SB
9	Fanny Roos	Sweden	16.82 m		

== Promotional events results ==
=== Men's ===
400 Metres hurdles
Rank	Athlete	Nation	Time	Notes
1st place, gold medalist(s)	Abderrahman Samba	Qatar	48.44	
2nd place, silver medalist(s)	Kerron Clement	United States	49.40	SB
3rd place, bronze medalist(s)	L. J. van Zyl	South Africa	49.49	
4	Nicholas Bett	Kenya	49.70	SB
5	Cornel Fredericks	South Africa	49.96	
6	Mohamed Shaib	Sudan	50.37	
7	Boniface Tumuti	Kenya	50.61	SB
8	Annsert Whyte	Jamaica	50.80	

== See also ==
- 2017 Diamond League
