= 2016 Doha Diamond League =

- Dates: 6 May 2016
- Host city: Doha, Qatar
- Venue: Suheim bin Hamad Stadium
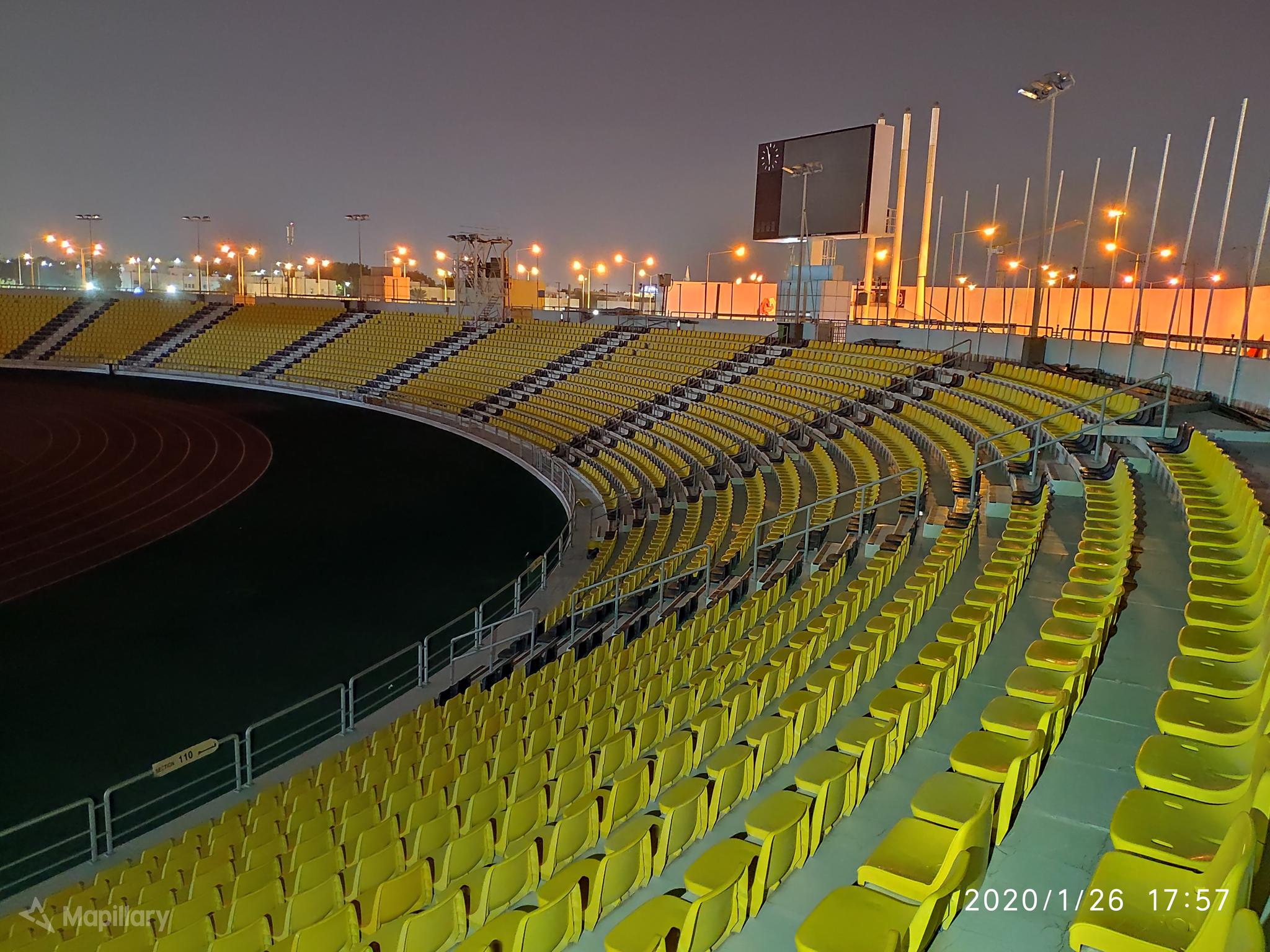
- Level: 2016 Diamond League

The 2016 Doha Diamond League was the 18th edition of the annual outdoor track and field meeting in Doha, Qatar. Held on 6 May at Suheim bin Hamad Stadium, it was the opening leg of the 2016 Diamond League – the highest level international track and field circuit.

== Diamond discipline results ==
A revised points system was introduced during the 2016 Diamond League season where athletes earned points towards a season leaderboard (10-6-4-2-1 respectively), points per event were then doubled in the Diamond League Finals. Athletes had to take part in the Diamond race during the finals to be eligible to win the Diamond trophy which is awarded to the athlete with the most points at the end of the season.

=== Men's ===
200 Metres
Rank	Athlete	Nation	Time	Points	Notes
1st place, gold medalist(s)	Ameer Webb	United States	19.85	10	MR
2nd place, silver medalist(s)	Alonso Edward	Panama	20.06	6	SB
3rd place, bronze medalist(s)	Femi Ogunode	Qatar	20.10	4	
4	Walter Dix	United States	20.14	2	SB
5	Churandy Martina	Netherlands	20.24	1	
6	Isiah Young	United States	20.29		
7	Nickel Ashmeade	Jamaica	20.31		
8	Lykourgos-Stefanos Tsakonas	Greece	20.66		
			Wind: (+1.9 m/s)		

400 Metres
Rank	Athlete	Nation	Time	Points	Notes
1st place, gold medalist(s)	LaShawn Merritt	United States	44.41	10	
2nd place, silver medalist(s)	Machel Cedenio	Trinidad and Tobago	44.68	6	SB
3rd place, bronze medalist(s)	Abdalelah Haroun	Qatar	44.81	4	
4	David Verburg	United States	45.54	2	
5	Tony McQuay	United States	45.65	1	
6	Isaac Makwala	Botswana	45.71		
7	Steven Gardiner	Bahamas	46.39		
8	Luguelín Santos	Dominican Republic	46.53		

1500 Metres
Rank	Athlete	Nation	Time	Points	Notes
1st place, gold medalist(s)	Asbel Kiprop	Kenya	3:32.15	10	WL
2nd place, silver medalist(s)	Elijah Manangoi	Kenya	3:33.67	6	
3rd place, bronze medalist(s)	Silas Kiplagat	Kenya	3:33.86	4	
4	Bethwell Birgen	Kenya	3:33.94	2	
5	Abdi Waiss Mouhyadin	Djibouti	3:34.55	1	PB
6	Aman Wote	Ethiopia	3:34.58		SB
7	Robert Biwott	Kenya	3:34.68		
8	Vincent Kibet	Kenya	3:34.81		
9	Dumisane Hlaselo	South Africa	3:36.65		SB
10	Musab Adam Ali	Qatar	3:36.67		PB
11	Dawit Wolde	Ethiopia	3:36.95		
12	Ryan Gregson	Australia	3:40.69		
—	Sadik Mikhou	Bahrain	DNF		
—	Jackson Kivuva	Kenya	DNF		PM
—	Andrew Kiptoo Rotich	Kenya	DNF		PM

110 Metres hurdles
Rank	Athlete	Nation	Time	Points	Notes
1st place, gold medalist(s)	Omar McLeod	Jamaica	13.05	10	WL
2nd place, silver medalist(s)	Hansle Parchment	Jamaica	13.10	6	SB
3rd place, bronze medalist(s)	Orlando Ortega	Spain	13.12	4	
4	David Oliver	United States	13.16	2	SB
5	Dimitri Bascou	France	13.33	1	
6	Aries Merritt	United States	13.37		SB
7	Spencer Adams	United States	13.44		SB
8	Antonio Alkana	South Africa	13.50		
			Wind: (+1.4 m/s)		

3000 Metres steeplechase
Rank	Athlete	Nation	Time	Points	Notes
1st place, gold medalist(s)	Conseslus Kipruto	Kenya	8:05.13	10	WL
2nd place, silver medalist(s)	Jairus Birech	Kenya	8:08.28	6	
3rd place, bronze medalist(s)	Abraham Kibiwot	Kenya	8:09.25	4	PB
4	John Kibet Koech	Bahrain	8:09.62	2	PB
5	Barnabas Kipyego	Kenya	8:10.11	1	PB
6	Clement Kemboi	Kenya	8:10.65		PB
7	Paul Kipsiele Koech	Kenya	8:15.69		
8	Abel Mutai	Kenya	8:16.84		SB
9	Lawrence Kemboi	Kenya	8:17.79		PB, PM
10	Mitko Tsenov	Bulgaria	8:21.34		
11	Mohamed Ismail Ibrahim	Djibouti	8:23.77		NR
12	Ezekiel Kemboi	Kenya	8:31.18		
13	Hillary Yego	Kenya	8:33.52		
14	Abdalla Targan	Sudan	8:38.82		SB
—	Hamid Ezzine	Morocco	DNF		
—	Hicham Sigueni	Morocco	DNF		
—	Brahim Taleb	Morocco	DNF		
—	Bernard Nganga	Kenya	DNF		PM

High jump
Rank	Athlete	Nation	Height	Points	Notes
1st place, gold medalist(s)	Erik Kynard	United States	2.33 m	10	WL
2nd place, silver medalist(s)	Zhang Guowei	China	2.31 m	6	SB
3rd place, bronze medalist(s)	Marco Fassinotti	Italy	2.29 m	4	
4	Robbie Grabarz	Great Britain	2.29 m	2	
5	Derek Drouin	Canada	2.29 m	1	SB
6	Donald Thomas	Bahamas	2.29 m		SB
7	Mutaz Barsham	Qatar	2.26 m		
8	Jesse Williams	United States	2.19 m		
9	Muamer Aissa Barsham	Qatar	2.15 m		

Triple jump
Rank	Athlete	Nation	Distance	Points	Notes
1st place, gold medalist(s)	Christian Taylor	United States	17.23 m (+0.3 m/s)	10	WL
2nd place, silver medalist(s)	Dong Bin	China	17.07 m (+0.7 m/s)	6	SB
3rd place, bronze medalist(s)	Alexis Copello	Azerbaijan	16.98 m (+0.5 m/s)	4	
4	Roman Valiyev	Kazakhstan	16.77 m (+0.8 m/s)	2	
5	Tosin Oke	Nigeria	16.73 m (+0.8 m/s)	1	SB
6	Samyr Lainé	Haiti	16.64 m (+0.6 m/s)		
7	Teddy Tamgho	France	16.54 m (+1.5 m/s)		
8	Nathan Douglas	Great Britain	16.43 m (+0.7 m/s)		
9	Leevan Sands	Bahamas	16.30 m (+0.9 m/s)		

Discus throw
Rank	Athlete	Nation	Distance	Points	Notes
1st place, gold medalist(s)	Piotr Małachowski	Poland	68.03 m	10	WL
2nd place, silver medalist(s)	Philip Milanov	Belgium	67.26 m	6	NR
3rd place, bronze medalist(s)	~~Victor Hogan~~	~~South Africa~~	~~65.59 m~~	~~4~~	DQ (Note: Due to doping violations Hogan's results during this competition were disqualified.)
4	Robert Urbanek	Poland	65.13 m	2	
5	Daniel Ståhl	Sweden	64.06 m	1	
6	Axel Härstedt	Sweden	62.54 m		
7	Zoltán Kővágó	Hungary	61.67 m		
8	Benn Harradine	Australia	61.04 m		
9	Ahmed Mohamed Dheeb	Qatar	58.80 m		

=== Women's ===
100 metres
Rank	Athlete	Nation	Time	Points	Notes
1st place, gold medalist(s)	Tori Bowie	United States	10.80	10	MR, WL
2nd place, silver medalist(s)	Dafne Schippers	Netherlands	10.83	6	
3rd place, bronze medalist(s)	Veronica Campbell Brown	Jamaica	10.91	4	
4	Murielle Ahouré-Demps	Ivory Coast	11.02	2	
5	Marie Josée Ta Lou-Smith	Ivory Coast	11.05	1	
6	Simone Facey	Jamaica	11.05		
7	Mikele Barber	United States	11.30		
8	Jeneba Tarmoh	United States	11.41		
			Wind: (+0.7 m/s)		

800 Metres
Rank	Athlete	Nation	Time	Points	Notes
1st place, gold medalist(s)	Caster Semenya	South Africa	1:58.26	10	WL
2nd place, silver medalist(s)	Habitam Alemu	Ethiopia	1:59.14	6	PB
3rd place, bronze medalist(s)	Eunice Sum	Kenya	1:59.74	4	SB
4	Malika Akkaoui	Morocco	1:59.93	2	
5	Shelayna Oskan-Clarke	Great Britain	2:01.04	1	
6	Chanelle Price	United States	2:01.05		SB
7	Winny Chebet	Kenya	2:02.27		SB
8	Adelle Tracey	Great Britain	2:02.30		
9	Molly Ludlow	United States	2:02.64		
10	Sofia Ennaoui	Poland	2:03.85		
—	Anastasia Lebid	Ukraine	DNF		PM

3000 Metres
Rank	Athlete	Nation	Time	Points	Notes
1st place, gold medalist(s)	Almaz Ayana	Ethiopia	8:23.11	10	WL
2nd place, silver medalist(s)	Mercy Cherono	Kenya	8:26.36	6	
3rd place, bronze medalist(s)	Gelete Burka	Ethiopia	8:28.49	4	
4	Vivian Cheruiyot	Kenya	8:31.86	2	
5	Janet Kisa	Kenya	8:32.13	1	PB
6	Viola Kibiwot	Kenya	8:34.50		
7	Etenesh Diro	Ethiopia	8:38.32		PB
8	Selah Jepleting Busienei	Kenya	8:42.01		PB
9	Meraf Bahta	Sweden	8:43.08		NR
10	Eilish McColgan	Great Britain	8:43.27		PB
11	Tigist Gashaw	Bahrain	8:48.60		
12	Mimi Belete	Bahrain	8:51.00		
13	Dera Dida	Ethiopia	8:54.73		PB
14	Alemitu Hawi	Ethiopia	8:56.03		
15	Haftamnesh Tesfay	Ethiopia	8:56.24		
16	Madeline Heiner	Australia	8:59.34		
—	Mary Kuria	Kenya	DNF		PM
—	Tamara Tverdostup	Ukraine	DNF		PM

400 Metres hurdles
Rank	Athlete	Nation	Time	Points	Notes
1st place, gold medalist(s)	Eilidh Doyle	Great Britain	54.53	10	WL
2nd place, silver medalist(s)	Kemi Adekoya	Bahrain	54.87	6	
3rd place, bronze medalist(s)	Kaliese Spencer	Jamaica	55.02	4	SB
4	Wenda Nel	South Africa	55.17	2	
5	Cassandra Tate	United States	55.57	1	SB
6	Meghan Beesley	Great Britain	55.72		
7	Tiffany Williams	United States	56.57		SB
8	Jernail Hayes	United States	1:00.48		

Pole vault
Rank	Athlete	Nation	Height	Points	Notes
1st place, gold medalist(s)	Sandi Morris	United States	4.83 m	10	DLR, MR, WL
2nd place, silver medalist(s)	Nicole Büchler	Switzerland	4.78 m	6	NR
3rd place, bronze medalist(s)	Katerina Stefanidi	Greece	4.73 m	4	PB
4	Li Ling	China	4.63 m	2	
5	Nikoleta Kyriakopoulou	Greece	4.53 m	1	
6	Katie Nageotte	United States	4.53 m		SB
7	Mary Saxer	United States	4.43 m		
8	Martina Strutz	Germany	4.43 m		
—	Silke Spiegelburg	Germany	NM		
—	Tori Pena	Ireland	NM		

Triple jump
Rank	Athlete	Nation	Distance	Points	Notes
1st place, gold medalist(s)	Caterine Ibargüen	Colombia	15.04 m (+1.5 m/s)	10	MR, WL
2nd place, silver medalist(s)	Yulimar Rojas	Venezuela	14.92 m (+2.6 m/s)	6	
3rd place, bronze medalist(s)	Olga Rypakova	Kazakhstan	14.61 m (+1.1 m/s)	4	
4	Jeanine Assani Issouf	France	14.26 m (+1.5 m/s)	2	PB
5	Paraskevi Papachristou	Greece	14.26 m (+1.7 m/s)	1	
6	Shanieka Ricketts	Jamaica	14.10 m (+0.9 m/s)		
7	Dana Velďáková	Slovakia	14.06 m (+1.7 m/s)		
8	Keila Costa	Brazil	13.69 m (+1.5 m/s)		SB
9	Anna Jagaciak-Michalska	Poland	13.67 m (+1.2 m/s)		
Best wind-legal performances
—	Yulimar Rojas	Venezuela	14.79 m (+1.3 m/s)		

Shot put
Rank	Athlete	Nation	Distance	Points	Notes
1st place, gold medalist(s)	Tia Brooks	United States	19.48 m	10	PB
2nd place, silver medalist(s)	Anita Márton	Hungary	19.22 m	6	SB
3rd place, bronze medalist(s)	Emel Dereli	Turkey	18.57 m	4	NR
4	Aliona Dubitskaya	Belarus	18.29 m	2	
5	Michelle Carter	United States	17.83 m	1	
6	Paulina Guba	Poland	17.73 m		
7	Taryn Suttie	Canada	17.63 m		
8	Felisha Johnson	United States	17.37 m		

Javelin throw
Rank	Athlete	Nation	Distance	Points	Notes
1st place, gold medalist(s)	Sunette Viljoen	South Africa	65.14 m	10	SB
2nd place, silver medalist(s)	Kathryn Mitchell	Australia	63.25 m	6	
3rd place, bronze medalist(s)	Lü Huihui	China	62.42 m	4	
4	Katharina Molitor	Germany	62.12 m	2	
5	Brittany Borman	United States	61.27 m	1	
6	Martina Ratej	Slovenia	60.32 m		
7	Madara Sady Ndure	Latvia	59.73 m		
8	Sanni Utriainen	Finland	56.02 m		
9	Elizabeth Gleadle	Canada	50.21 m		

== See also ==
- 2016 Diamond League
