= 2018 Doha Diamond League =

- Dates: 4 May 2018
- Host city: Doha, Qatar
- Venue: Suheim bin Hamad Stadium
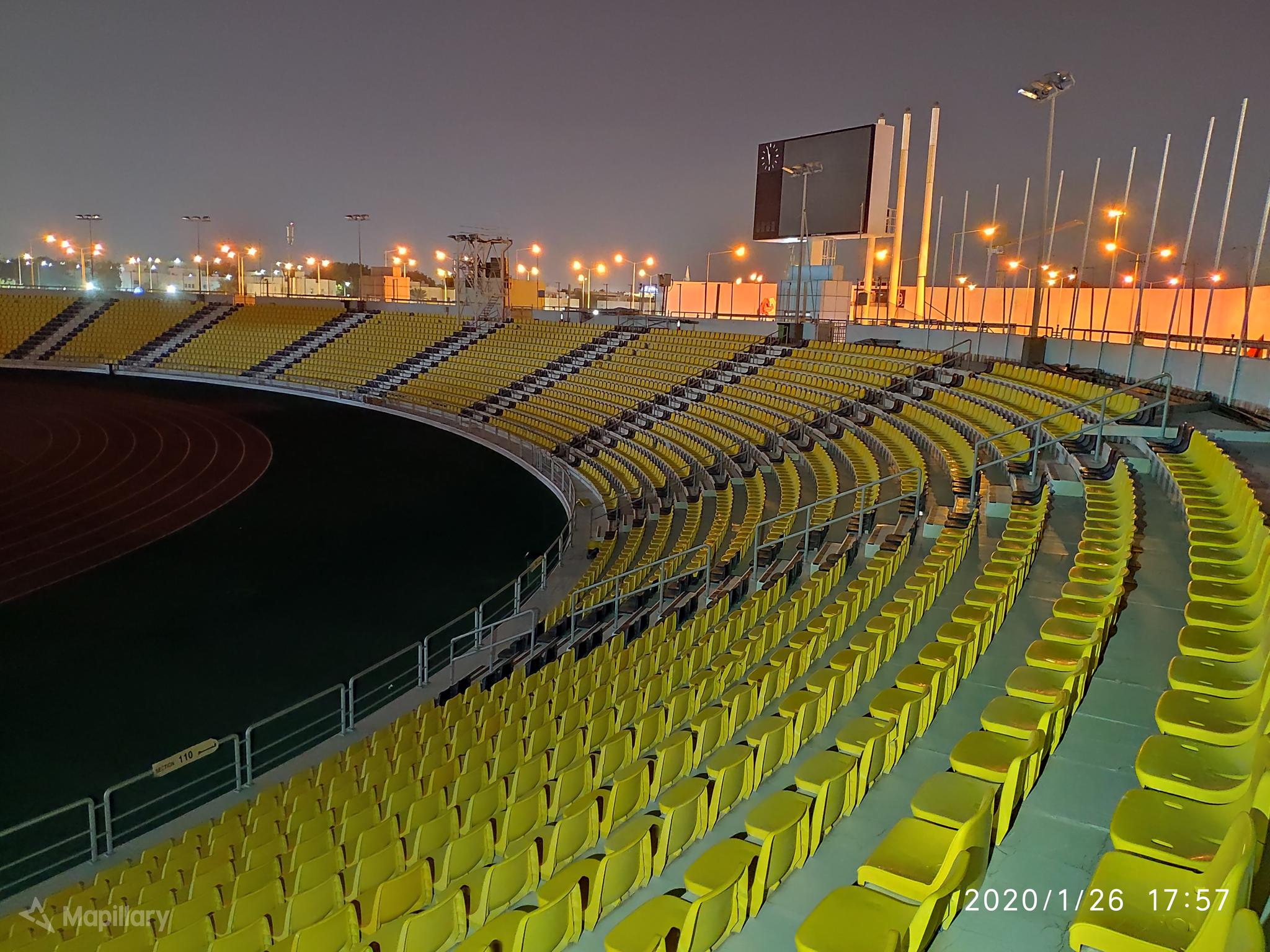
- Level: 2018 Diamond League

The 2018 Doha Diamond League was the 20th edition of the annual outdoor track and field meeting in Doha, Qatar. Held on 4 May at Suheim bin Hamad Stadium, it was the opening leg of the 2018 Diamond League – the highest level international track and field circuit.

== Diamond discipline results ==
Athletes competing in the Diamond League disciplines earned extra compensation and points which went towards qualifying for the Diamond League finals in Zürich and Brussels. First place earned 8 points, with each step down in place earning one less point than the previous, until no points are awarded in 9th place or lower. In the case of a tie, each tying athlete earns the full amount of points for the place.

=== Men's ===
200 Metres
Rank	Athlete	Nation	Time	Points	Notes
1st place, gold medalist(s)	Noah Lyles	United States	19.83	8	MR, PB
2nd place, silver medalist(s)	Jereem Richards	Trinidad and Tobago	19.99	7	SB
3rd place, bronze medalist(s)	Ramil Guliyev	Turkey	20.11	6	SB
4	Aaron Brown	Canada	20.18	5	=SB
5	Nethaneel Mitchell-Blake	Great Britain	20.37	4	SB
6	Andre De Grasse	Canada	20.46	3	SB
7	Brandon Carnes	United States	20.56	2	SB
8	Rasheed Dwyer	Jamaica	20.72	1	
			Wind: (+1.3 m/s)		

400 Metres
Rank	Athlete	Nation	Time	Points	Notes
1st place, gold medalist(s)	Steven Gardiner	Bahamas	43.87	8	MR, NR, WL
2nd place, silver medalist(s)	Abdalelah Haroun	Qatar	44.50	7	SB
3rd place, bronze medalist(s)	Isaac Makwala	Botswana	44.92	6	
4	Gil Roberts	United States	45.22	5	SB
5	Baboloki Thebe	Botswana	45.58	4	
6	Mohamed Nasir Abbas	Qatar	45.76	3	
7	Vernon Norwood	United States	45.82	2	SB
8	Pieter Conradie	South Africa	46.68	1	

800 Metres
Rank	Athlete	Nation	Time	Points	Notes
1st place, gold medalist(s)	Emmanuel Korir	Kenya	1:45.21	8	SB
2nd place, silver medalist(s)	Elijah Manangoi	Kenya	1:45.60	7	SB
3rd place, bronze medalist(s)	Nicholas Kipkoech	Kenya	1:46.51	6	SB
4	Adam Kszczot	Poland	1:46.70	5	SB
5	Ferguson Rotich	Kenya	1:46.76	4	SB
6	Clayton Murphy	United States	1:47.22	3	=SB
7	Antoine Gakeme	Burundi	1:47.25	2	SB
8	Jamal Hairane	Qatar	1:47.62	1	SB
9	Ebrahim Al-Zofairi	Kuwait	1:47.79		SB
10	Kipyegon Bett	Kenya	1:48.32		SB
—	Bram Som	Netherlands	DNF		PM

400 Metres hurdles
Rank	Athlete	Nation	Time	Points	Notes
1st place, gold medalist(s)	Abderrahman Samba	Qatar	47.57	8	DLR, MR, WL
2nd place, silver medalist(s)	Bershawn Jackson	United States	49.08	7	SB
3rd place, bronze medalist(s)	Kyron McMaster	British Virgin Islands	49.46	6	
4	Yasmani Copello	Turkey	49.95	5	SB
5	Cornel Fredericks	South Africa	50.03	4	
6	Kerron Clement	United States	50.19	3	SB
7	Jack Green	Great Britain	50.22	2	
8	Kariem Hussein	Switzerland	51.40	1	SB

High jump
Rank	Athlete	Nation	Height	Points	Notes
1st place, gold medalist(s)	Mutaz Barsham	Qatar	2.40 m	8	MR, WL
2nd place, silver medalist(s)	Majd Eddin Ghazal	Syria	2.33 m	7	SB
3rd place, bronze medalist(s)	Donald Thomas	Bahamas	2.30 m	6	
4	Mateusz Przybylko	Germany	2.24 m	5	SB
5	Andriy Protsenko	Ukraine	2.24 m	4	SB
6	Wang Yu	China	2.20 m	3	SB
6	Edgar Rivera	Mexico	2.20 m	3	SB
8	Hamdi Ali	Qatar	2.20 m	1	SB
9	Jamal Wilson	Bahamas	2.20 m		
10	Tihomir Ivanov	Bulgaria	2.15 m		SB

Triple jump
Rank	Athlete	Nation	Distance	Points	Notes
1st place, gold medalist(s)	Pedro Pichardo	Portugal	17.95 m (+0.6 m/s)	8	WL
2nd place, silver medalist(s)	Christian Taylor	United States	17.81 m (+0.6 m/s)	7	SB
3rd place, bronze medalist(s)	Alexis Copello	Azerbaijan	17.21 m (+0.5 m/s)	6	SB
4	Nelson Évora	Portugal	17.04 m (+0.2 m/s)	5	SB
5	Chris Benard	United States	16.96 m (+1.4 m/s)	4	SB
6	Godfrey Khotso Mokoena	South Africa	16.92 m (+1.3 m/s)	3	SB
7	Dong Bin	China	16.65 m (+0.7 m/s)	2	
8	Max Heß	Germany	16.52 m (+1.4 m/s)	1	SB
9	Rashid Al-Mannai	Qatar	15.83 m (+0.8 m/s)		SB
10	Jean-Marc Pontvianne	France	15.55 m (+0.2 m/s)		SB
11	Ahmed Faisal Suleiman Mohamed	Qatar	15.35 m (+0.2 m/s)		SB

Javelin throw
Rank	Athlete	Nation	Distance	Points	Notes
1st place, gold medalist(s)	Thomas Röhler	Germany	91.78 m	8	SB
2nd place, silver medalist(s)	Johannes Vetter	Germany	91.56 m	7	
3rd place, bronze medalist(s)	Andreas Hofmann	Germany	90.08 m	6	SB
4	Neeraj Chopra	India	87.43 m	5	NR
5	Jakub Vadlejch	Czech Republic	86.67 m	4	SB
6	Magnus Kirt	Estonia	83.97 m	3	SB
7	Ahmed Bader Magour	Qatar	83.71 m	2	SB
8	Julius Yego	Kenya	80.75 m	1	SB
9	Petr Frydrych	Czech Republic	80.07 m		SB
10	Hamish Peacock	Australia	76.45 m		

=== Women's ===
100 Metres
Rank	Athlete	Nation	Time	Points	Notes
1st place, gold medalist(s)	Marie Josée Ta Lou-Smith	Ivory Coast	10.85	8	PB, WL
2nd place, silver medalist(s)	Blessing Okagbare	Nigeria	10.90	7	SB
3rd place, bronze medalist(s)	Elaine Thompson-Herah	Jamaica	10.93	6	SB
4	Murielle Ahouré-Demps	Ivory Coast	10.96	5	SB
5	Carina Horn	South Africa	10.98	4	NR
6	Dafne Schippers	Netherlands	11.03	3	SB
7	Mujinga Kambundji	Switzerland	11.17	2	SB
8	Jura Levy	Jamaica	11.29	1	SB
			Wind: (+1.5 m/s)		

1500 Metres
Rank	Athlete	Nation	Time	Points	Notes
1st place, gold medalist(s)	Caster Semenya	South Africa	3:59.92	8	NR, WL
2nd place, silver medalist(s)	Nelly Jepkosgei	Bahrain	4:00.99	7	PB
3rd place, bronze medalist(s)	Habitam Alemu	Ethiopia	4:01.41	6	SB
4	Besu Sado	Ethiopia	4:01.75	5	SB
5	Alemaz Samuel	Ethiopia	4:01.78	4	PB
6	Gudaf Tsegay	Ethiopia	4:01.81	3	SB
7	Rababe Arafi	Morocco	4:03.69	2	SB
8	Judy Kiyeng	Kenya	4:03.87	1	PB
9	Eunice Sum	Kenya	4:05.38		SB
10	Winny Chebet	Kenya	4:05.76		SB
11	Linden Hall	Australia	4:07.07		
12	Zoe Buckman	Australia	4:07.25		
—	Malika Akkaoui	Morocco	DNF		
—	Emily Cherotich Tuei	Kenya	DNF		PM
—	Noélie Yarigo	Benin	DNF		PM

3000 Metres
Rank	Athlete	Nation	Time	Points	Notes
1st place, gold medalist(s)	Caroline Chepkoech Kipkirui	Kenya	8:29.05	8	PB, WL
2nd place, silver medalist(s)	Agnes Tirop	Kenya	8:29.09	7	PB
3rd place, bronze medalist(s)	Hyvin Jepkemoi	Kenya	8:30.51	6	PB
4	Jenny Simpson	United States	8:30.83	5	SB
5	Letesenbet Gidey	Ethiopia	8:30.96	4	PB
6	Lilian Kasait Rengeruk	Kenya	8:33.13	3	SB
7	Meskerem Mamo	Ethiopia	8:33.63	2	SB
8	Beyenu Degefa	Ethiopia	8:35.76	1	PB
9	Yasemin Can	Turkey	8:36.24		PB
10	Norah Jeruto	Kenya	8:37.09		PB
11	Fotyen Tesfay	Ethiopia	8:47.73		SB
12	Eilish McColgan	Great Britain	8:48.03		SB
13	Abersh Minsewo	Ethiopia	8:51.93		PB
14	Hellen Obiri	Kenya	8:53.65		SB
15	Sandra Tuei	Kenya	8:58.04		SB
16	Genevieve Gregson	Australia	9:31.14		SB
—	Tamara Tverdostup	Ukraine	DNF		PM
—	Mary Kuria	Kenya	DNF		PM

100 Metres hurdles
Rank	Athlete	Nation	Time	Points	Notes
1st place, gold medalist(s)	Kendra Harrison	United States	12.53	8	SB
2nd place, silver medalist(s)	Brianna Rollins-McNeal	United States	12.58	7	
3rd place, bronze medalist(s)	Sharika Nelvis	United States	12.75	6	SB
4	Jasmin Stowers	United States	12.77	5	SB
5	Danielle Williams	Jamaica	12.82 [.813]	4	
6	Isabelle Pedersen	Norway	12.82 [.819]	3	SB
7	Nadine Visser	Netherlands	12.94	2	SB
8	Dawn Harper-Nelson	United States	13.21	1	SB
			Wind: (+0.5 m/s)		

Pole vault
Rank	Athlete	Nation	Height	Points	Notes
1st place, gold medalist(s)	Sandi Morris	United States	4.84 m	8	MR
2nd place, silver medalist(s)	Holly Bradshaw	Great Britain	4.64 m	7	
3rd place, bronze medalist(s)	Katie Moon	United States	4.64 m	6	SB
4	Nikoleta Kyriakopoulou	Greece	4.64 m	5	SB
4	Katerina Stefanidi	Greece	4.64 m	5	SB
6	Robeilys Peinado	Venezuela	4.64 m	3	SB
7	Alysha Newman	Canada	4.54 m	2	
8	Olga Mullina	Authorised Neutral Athletes	4.44 m	1	SB
9	Emily Grove	United States	4.24 m		

Discus throw
Rank	Athlete	Nation	Distance	Points	Notes
1st place, gold medalist(s)	Sandra Elkasević	Croatia	71.38 m	8	DLR, MR, WL
2nd place, silver medalist(s)	Yaime Pérez	Cuba	66.82 m	7	
3rd place, bronze medalist(s)	Denia Caballero	Cuba	63.80 m	6	
4	Andressa de Morais	Brazil	63.77 m	5	SB
5	Dani Stevens	Australia	63.59 m	4	
6	Gia Lewis-Smallwood	United States	58.73 m	3	SB
7	Whitney Ashley	United States	58.42 m	2	

== Promotional events results ==
=== Men's ===
1500 Metres
Rank	Athlete	Nation	Time	Points
1st place, gold medalist(s)	Taresa Tolosa	Ethiopia	3:35.07	SB
2nd place, silver medalist(s)	George Manangoi	Kenya	3:35.53	PB
3rd place, bronze medalist(s)	Justus Soget	Kenya	3:35.71	SB
4	Charles Simotwo	Kenya	3:36.40	SB
5	Bethwell Birgen	Kenya	3:36.54	SB
6	Abdalaati Iguider	Morocco	3:36.59	SB
7	Ryan Gregson	Australia	3:37.00	SB
8	Collins Cheboi	Kenya	3:37.83	SB
9	Vincent Kibet	Kenya	3:38.11	SB
10	Jordan Williamsz	Australia	3:40.06	
11	Fouad Elkaam	Morocco	3:40.91	SB
12	Corey Bellemore	Canada	3:41.34	PB
13	Musab Adam Ali	Qatar	3:41.90	SB
—	Andrew Kiptoo Rotich	Kenya	DNF	PM
—	Jackson Kivuva	Kenya	DNF	PM

3000 Metres steeplechase
Rank	Athlete	Nation	Time	Points
1st place, gold medalist(s)	Chala Beyo	Ethiopia	8:13.71	SB
2nd place, silver medalist(s)	Lawrence Kemboi	Kenya	8:15.07	PB
3rd place, bronze medalist(s)	Emmanuel Kiprono	Kenya	8:16.24	PB
4	Barnabas Kipyego	Kenya	8:17.30	SB
5	Tesfaye Deriba	Ethiopia	8:17.51	SB
6	Albert Chemutai	Uganda	8:18.80	PB
7	Hailemariyam Amare	Ethiopia	8:21.21	SB
8	Tolosa Nurgi	Ethiopia	8:24.11	SB
9	Mohamed Tindouft	Morocco	8:24.80	SB
10	Justus Lagat	Kenya	8:26.17	SB
11	Clement Kemboi	Kenya	8:31.02	SB
12	Tesfaye Girma	Ethiopia	8:38.70	SB
13	Cleophas Kandie Meyan	Kenya	8:43.87	SB
14	Muhand Khamis Saifeldin	Qatar	9:04.64	PB
—	Hillary Yego	Turkey	DNF	PM
—	Bernard Nganga	Kenya	DNF	PM

== See also ==
- 2018 Diamond League
