= 2023 Doha Diamond League =

- Dates: 5 May 2023
- Host city: Doha, Qatar
- Venue: Suheim bin Hamad Stadium
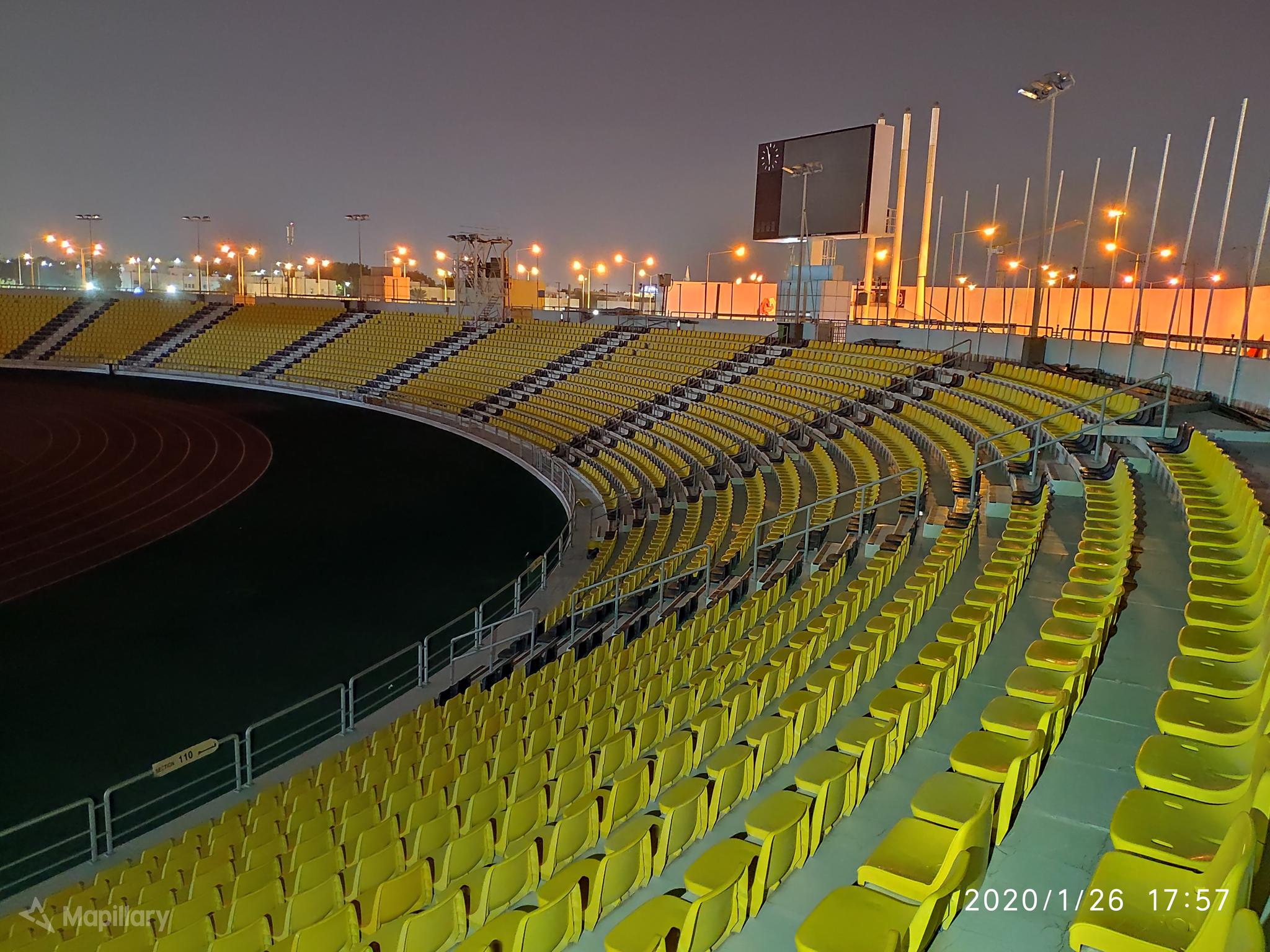
- Level: 2023 Diamond League

The 2023 Doha Diamond League was the 25th edition of the annual outdoor track and field meeting in Doha, Qatar. Held on 5 May 2023 at the Suheim bin Hamad Stadium, it was the opening day for the 2023 Diamond League – the highest level international track and field circuit.

In the sprints, the meeting was highlighted by Sha'Carri Richardson winning her first Diamond League race, arguably the most significant win of her career to that point. Fred Kerley also won the 200 metres coming from behind, cementing his status as the favorite at the World Championships that season.

Lamecha Girma, typically a steeplechase specialist, beat a number of non-steeplechasers to win the 3000 metres. In the javelin throw, Olympic champion Neeraj Chopra's win and world lead generated a lot of international interest.

== Results ==
Athletes competing in the Diamond League disciplines earned extra compensation and points which went towards qualifying for the Diamond League finals in Eugene. First place earned 8 points, with each step down in place earning one less point than the previous, until no points are awarded in 9th place or lower.

=== Diamond Discipline ===
Men's 200m (+0.3 m/s)
| Place | Athlete | Country | Time | Points |
|---|---|---|---|---|
| 1st place, gold medalist(s) | Fred Kerley | United States | 19.92 | 8 |
| 2nd place, silver medalist(s) | Kenny Bednarek | United States | 20.11 | 7 |
| 3rd place, bronze medalist(s) | Aaron Brown | Canada | 20.20 | 6 |
| 4 | Kyree King | United States | 20.29 | 5 |
| 5 | Joseph Fahnbulleh | Liberia | 20.29 | 4 |
| 6 | Andre De Grasse | Canada | 20.35 | 3 |
| 7 | Alexander Ogando | Dominican Republic | 20.62 | 2 |
| 8 | Michael Norman | United States | 20.65 | 1 |

Men's 800m
| Place | Athlete | Country | Time | Points |
|---|---|---|---|---|
| 1st place, gold medalist(s) | Slimane Moula | Algeria | 1:46.06 | 8 |
| 2nd place, silver medalist(s) | Wyclife Kinyamal | Kenya | 1:46.61 | 7 |
| 3rd place, bronze medalist(s) | Djamel Sedjati | Algeria | 1:46.97 | 6 |
| 4 | Clayton Murphy | United States | 1:47.96 | 5 |
| 5 | Mouad Zahafi | Morocco | 1:48.17 | 4 |
| 6 | Andreas Kramer | Sweden | 1:48.18 | 3 |
| 7 | Mark English | Ireland | 1:48.56 | 2 |
| 8 | Musaeb Abdulrahman Balla | Qatar | 1:48.88 | 1 |
| 9 | Abdirahman Saeed Hassan | Qatar | 1:49.03 | |
| 10 | Noah Kibet | Kenya | 1:49.95 | |
| | Erik Sowinski | United States | DNF | |

Men's 3000m
| Place | Athlete | Country | Time | Points |
|---|---|---|---|---|
| 1st place, gold medalist(s) | Lamecha Girma | Ethiopia | 7:26.18 | 8 |
| 2nd place, silver medalist(s) | Selemon Barega | Ethiopia | 7:27.16 | 7 |
| 3rd place, bronze medalist(s) | Berihu Aregawi | Ethiopia | 7:27.61 | 6 |
| 4 | Soufiane El Bakkali | Morocco | 7:33.87 | 5 |
| 5 | Timothy Cheruiyot | Kenya | 7:36.72 | 4 |
| 6 | Getnet Wale | Ethiopia | 7:36.81 | 3 |
| 7 | Andreas Almgren | Sweden | 7:37.05 | 2 |
| 8 | Mohamed Amin Jhinaoui | Tunisia | 7:37.56 | 1 |
| 9 | Ishmael Kipkurui | Kenya | 7:39.84 | |
| 10 | Telahun Haile Bekele | Ethiopia | 7:40.29 | |
| 11 | Adel Mechaal | Spain | 7:41.42 | |
| 12 | Matthew Ramsden | Australia | 7:47.71 | |
| | Stewart McSweyn | Australia | DNF | |
| | Kyumbe Munguti | Kenya | DNF | |
| | Musab Adam Ali | Qatar | DNF | |
| | Callum Davies | Australia | DNF | |

Men's 400mH
| Place | Athlete | Country | Time | Points |
|---|---|---|---|---|
| 1st place, gold medalist(s) | Rai Benjamin | United States | 47.78 | 8 |
| 2nd place, silver medalist(s) | CJ Allen | United States | 47.93 | 7 |
| 3rd place, bronze medalist(s) | Wilfried Happio | France | 49.12 | 6 |
| 4 | Khallifah Rosser | United States | 49.25 | 5 |
| 5 | Trevor Bassitt | United States | 49.52 | 4 |
| 6 | Sokwakhana Zazini | South Africa | 49.74 | 3 |
| 7 | Thomas Barr | Ireland | 49.88 | 2 |
| 8 | İsmail Nezir | Turkey | 51.40 | 1 |

Men's High Jump
| Place | Athlete | Country | Mark | Points |
|---|---|---|---|---|
| 1st place, gold medalist(s) | JuVaughn Harrison | United States | 2.32 m | 8 |
| 2nd place, silver medalist(s) | Woo Sang-hyeok | South Korea | 2.27 m | 7 |
| 3rd place, bronze medalist(s) | Mutaz Essa Barshim | Qatar | 2.24 m | 6 |
| 4 | Norbert Kobielski | Poland | 2.18 m | 5 |
| 5 | Shelby McEwen | United States | 2.18 m | 4 |
| 6 | Edgar Rivera | Mexico | 2.18 m | 3 |
| 7 | Thomas Carmoy | Belgium | 2.15 m | 2 |
| | Tomohiro Shinno | Japan | NM | |
| | Django Lovett | Canada | NM | |

Men's Triple Jump
| Place | Athlete | Country | Mark | Points |
|---|---|---|---|---|
| 1st place, gold medalist(s) | Pedro Pichardo | Portugal | 17.91 m (+2.1 m/s) | 8 |
| 2nd place, silver medalist(s) | Hugues Fabrice Zango | Burkina Faso | 17.81 m (+1.5 m/s) | 7 |
| 3rd place, bronze medalist(s) | Andy Díaz | Italy | 17.80 m (+2.6 m/s) | 6 |
| 4 | Lázaro Martínez | Cuba | 17.71 m (+3.4 m/s) | 5 |
| 5 | Zhu Yaming | China | 16.95 m (+2.0 m/s) | 4 |
| 6 | Jah-Nhai Perinchief | Bermuda | 16.86 m (+2.1 m/s) | 3 |
| 7 | Emmanuel Ihemeje | Italy | 16.85 m (+1.8 m/s) | 2 |
| 8 | Donald Scott | United States | 16.81 m (+2.5 m/s) | 1 |
| 9 | Christian Taylor | United States | 16.53 m (+3.1 m/s) | |
| 10 | Eldhose Paul | India | 15.84 m (+2.2 m/s) | |
| — | Almir dos Santos | Brazil | NM | |
Best wind-legal performances
| — | Jah-Nhai Perinchief | Bermuda | 16.73 m (+1.1 m/s) | |
| — | Christian Taylor | United States | 16.27 m (+1.0 m/s) | |

Men's Discus Throw
| Place | Athlete | Country | Mark | Points |
|---|---|---|---|---|
| 1st place, gold medalist(s) | Kristjan Čeh | Slovenia | 70.89 m | 8 |
| 2nd place, silver medalist(s) | Daniel Ståhl | Sweden | 67.14 m | 7 |
| 3rd place, bronze medalist(s) | Sam Mattis | United States | 64.69 m | 6 |
| 4 | Matthew Denny | Australia | 64.42 m | 5 |
| 5 | Lawrence Okoye | Great Britain | 64.31 m | 4 |
| 6 | Simon Pettersson | Sweden | 64.30 m | 3 |
| 7 | Alin Firfirică | Romania | 62.98 m | 2 |
| 8 | Moaaz Mohamed Ibrahim | Qatar | 61.92 m | 1 |
| 9 | Nicholas Percy | Great Britain | 58.49 m | |
| 10 | Essa Al-Zenkawi | Kuwait | 56.80 m | |

Men's Javelin Throw
| Place | Athlete | Country | Mark | Points |
|---|---|---|---|---|
| 1st place, gold medalist(s) | Neeraj Chopra | India | 88.67 m | 8 |
| 2nd place, silver medalist(s) | Jakub Vadlejch | Czech Republic | 88.63 m | 7 |
| 3rd place, bronze medalist(s) | Anderson Peters | Grenada | 85.88 m | 6 |
| 4 | Julian Weber | Germany | 82.62 m | 5 |
| 5 | Andrian Mardare | Moldova | 81.67 m | 4 |
| 6 | Keshorn Walcott | Trinidad and Tobago | 81.27 m | 3 |
| 7 | Genki Dean | Japan | 79.44 m | 2 |
| 8 | Curtis Thompson | United States | 74.13 m | 1 |
| | Julius Yego | Kenya | NM | |
| | Oliver Helander | Finland | NM | |

Women's 100m (+0.9 m/s)
| Place | Athlete | Country | Time | Points |
|---|---|---|---|---|
| 1st place, gold medalist(s) | Sha'Carri Richardson | United States | 10.76 | 8 |
| 2nd place, silver medalist(s) | Shericka Jackson | Jamaica | 10.85 | 7 |
| 3rd place, bronze medalist(s) | Dina Asher-Smith | Great Britain | 10.98 | 6 |
| 4 | Twanisha Terry | United States | 11.07 | 5 |
| 5 | Zoe Hobbs | New Zealand | 11.08 | 4 |
| 6 | Teahna Daniels | United States | 11.18 | 3 |
| 7 | Melissa Jefferson | United States | 11.19 | 2 |
| 8 | Abby Steiner | United States | 11.19 | 1 |

Women's 400m
| Place | Athlete | Country | Time | Points |
|---|---|---|---|---|
| 1st place, gold medalist(s) | Marileidy Paulino | Dominican Republic | 50.51 | 8 |
| 2nd place, silver medalist(s) | Shamier Little | United States | 50.84 | 7 |
| 3rd place, bronze medalist(s) | Natalia Kaczmarek | Poland | 51.64 | 6 |
| 4 | Sada Williams | Barbados | 52.05 | 5 |
| 5 | Candice McLeod | Jamaica | 52.43 | 4 |
| 6 | Stephenie Ann McPherson | Jamaica | 52.93 | 3 |
| 7 | Justyna Święty-Ersetic | Poland | 53.08 | 2 |
| 8 | Kyra Jefferson | United States | 54.00 | 1 |

Women's 1500m
| Place | Athlete | Country | Time | Points |
|---|---|---|---|---|
| 1st place, gold medalist(s) | Faith Kipyegon | Kenya | 3:58.57 | 8 |
| 2nd place, silver medalist(s) | Diribe Welteji | Ethiopia | 3:59.34 | 7 |
| 3rd place, bronze medalist(s) | Freweyni Hailu | Ethiopia | 4:00.29 | 6 |
| 4 | Jessica Hull | Australia | 4:00.90 | 5 |
| 5 | Abbey Caldwell | Australia | 4:01.15 | 4 |
| 6 | Birke Haylom | Ethiopia | 4:01.86 | 3 |
| 7 | Hirut Meshesha | Ethiopia | 4:02.25 | 2 |
| 8 | Axumawit Embaye | Ethiopia | 4:03.40 | 1 |
| 9 | Konstanze Klosterhalfen | Germany | 4:05.63 | |
| 10 | Cory McGee | United States | 4:06.03 | |
| 11 | Lemlem Hailu | Ethiopia | 4:08.38 | |
| 12 | Georgia Griffith | Australia | 4:15.49 | |
| 13 | Angelika Cichocka | Poland | 4:17.75 | |
| 14 | Winny Chebet | Kenya | 4:24.21 | |
| | Sarah Billings | Australia | DNF | |

Women's 100mH (+1.1 m/s)
| Place | Athlete | Country | Time | Points |
|---|---|---|---|---|
| 1st place, gold medalist(s) | Jasmine Camacho-Quinn | Puerto Rico | 12.48 | 8 |
| 2nd place, silver medalist(s) | Alaysha Johnson | United States | 12.66 | 7 |
| 3rd place, bronze medalist(s) | Nia Ali | United States | 12.69 | 6 |
| 4 | Megan Tapper | Jamaica | 12.76 | 5 |
| 5 | Tonea Marshall | United States | 12.79 | 4 |
| 6 | Reetta Hurske | Finland | 12.92 | 3 |
| 7 | Michelle Jenneke | Australia | 13.00 | 2 |
| 8 | Sarah Lavin | Ireland | 13.08 | 1 |

Women's 3000mSC
| Place | Athlete | Country | Time | Points |
|---|---|---|---|---|
| 1st place, gold medalist(s) | Winfred Yavi | Bahrain | 9:04.38 | 8 |
| 2nd place, silver medalist(s) | Sembo Almayew | Ethiopia | 9:05.83 | 7 |
| 3rd place, bronze medalist(s) | Faith Cherotich | Kenya | 9:06.43 | 6 |
| 4 | Beatrice Chepkoech | Kenya | 9:06.90 | 5 |
| 5 | Maruša Mišmaš-Zrimšek | Slovenia | 9:13.61 | 4 |
| 6 | Zerfe Wondemagegn | Ethiopia | 9:13.80 | 3 |
| 7 | Jackline Chepkoech | Kenya | 9:17.15 | 2 |
| 8 | Mekides Abebe | Ethiopia | 9:18.96 | 1 |
| 9 | Marwa Bouzayani | Tunisia | 9:25.37 | |
| 10 | Emma Coburn | United States | 9:29.41 | |
| 11 | Peruth Chemutai | Uganda | 9:31.71 | |
| | Valerie Constien | United States | DNF | |
| | Doris Lengole Cherop | Kenya | DNF | |

Women's Pole Vault
| Place | Athlete | Country | Mark | Points |
|---|---|---|---|---|
| 1st place, gold medalist(s) | Katie Moon | United States | 4.81 m | 8 |
| 2nd place, silver medalist(s) | Tina Šutej | Slovenia | 4.76 m | 7 |
| 3rd place, bronze medalist(s) | Sandi Morris | United States | 4.71 m | 6 |
| 4 | Katerina Stefanidi | Greece | 4.55 m | 5 |
| 5 | Roberta Bruni | Italy | 4.55 m | 4 |
| 6 | Bridget Williams | United States | 4.55 m | 3 |
| 7 | Nina Kennedy | Australia | 4.45 m | 2 |
| 8 | Alysha Newman | Canada | 4.45 m | 1 |
| 9 | Wilma Murto | Finland | 4.30 m | |

=== National events ===
Men's 100m
| Place | Athlete | Country | Time | Heat |
|---|---|---|---|---|
| 1st place, gold medalist(s) | Jerome Blake | Canada | 10.11 | 1 |
| 2nd place, silver medalist(s) | Nasser Mahmoud Mohammed | Saudi Arabia | 10.20 | 2 |
| 3rd place, bronze medalist(s) | Ali Anwar Ali al-Balushi | Oman | 10.28 | 1 |
| 4 | Femi Ogunode | Qatar | 10.29 | 1 |
| 5 | Tosin Ogunode | Qatar | 10.31 | 1 |
| 6 | Hussein Ali al-Khafaji | Iraq | 10.35 | 1 |
| 7 | Saeed al Sahoti | Qatar | 10.61 | 2 |
| 8 | Abdelmadjid Mahamat Mahadjir | Qatar | 10.63 | 2 |
| 9 | Khalid Wadi Adoum | Qatar | 10.66 | 1 |
| 10 | Youssef Hamed | Qatar | 10.68 | 1 |
| 11 | Abdullahi Saleck | Mauritius | 10.70 | 2 |
| 12 | Abdraman Mahamat Kogne | Qatar | 10.79 | 2 |
| 13 | Amir Muhammad | Qatar | 10.86 | 1 |
| 14 | Nayef Mubarak Al-Rashidi | Qatar | 10.92 | 2 |
| 15 | Oumar Doudai Abakar | Qatar | 10.95 | 2 |

Men's 400m
| Place | Athlete | Country | Time |
|---|---|---|---|
| 1st place, gold medalist(s) | Ashrat Hussen Osman | Qatar | 47.30 |
| 2nd place, silver medalist(s) | Hussein Ibrahim Issaka | Qatar | 48.17 |
| 3rd place, bronze medalist(s) | Youssouf Abdel | Qatar | 48.39 |
| 4 | Ali Maizen | Qatar | 48.57 |
| 5 | Amar Ebed Ebed | Qatar | 49.09 |
| 6 | Mubarak Musa | Sudan | 50.20 |
| 7 | Daoud Ismail Ibrahmin Armadi | Sudan | 50.50 |
| | Mikhail Litvin | Kazakhstan | DNF |

Men's 400mH
| Place | Athlete | Country | Time |
|---|---|---|---|
| 1st place, gold medalist(s) | Ismail Doudai Abakar | Qatar | 49.18 |
| 2nd place, silver medalist(s) | Kemorena Tisang | Botswana | 50.92 |
| 3rd place, bronze medalist(s) | Muhammad Abdallah Kounta | France | 50.98 |
| 4 | Vyacheslav Zems | Kazakhstan | 51.45 |
| 5 | Mahmoud Moussa | Qatar | 53.17 |
| 6 | Mosa al Moaez | Sudan | 53.44 |
| 7 | Mahamat Abakar Abdrahman | Qatar | 53.92 |
| 8 | Mohamed Khalifa Nuh | Qatar | 56.69 |

== See also ==
- 2023 Diamond League
