= 2024 Doha Diamond League =

- Dates: 10 May 2024
- Host city: Doha, Qatar
- Venue: Suheim bin Hamad Stadium
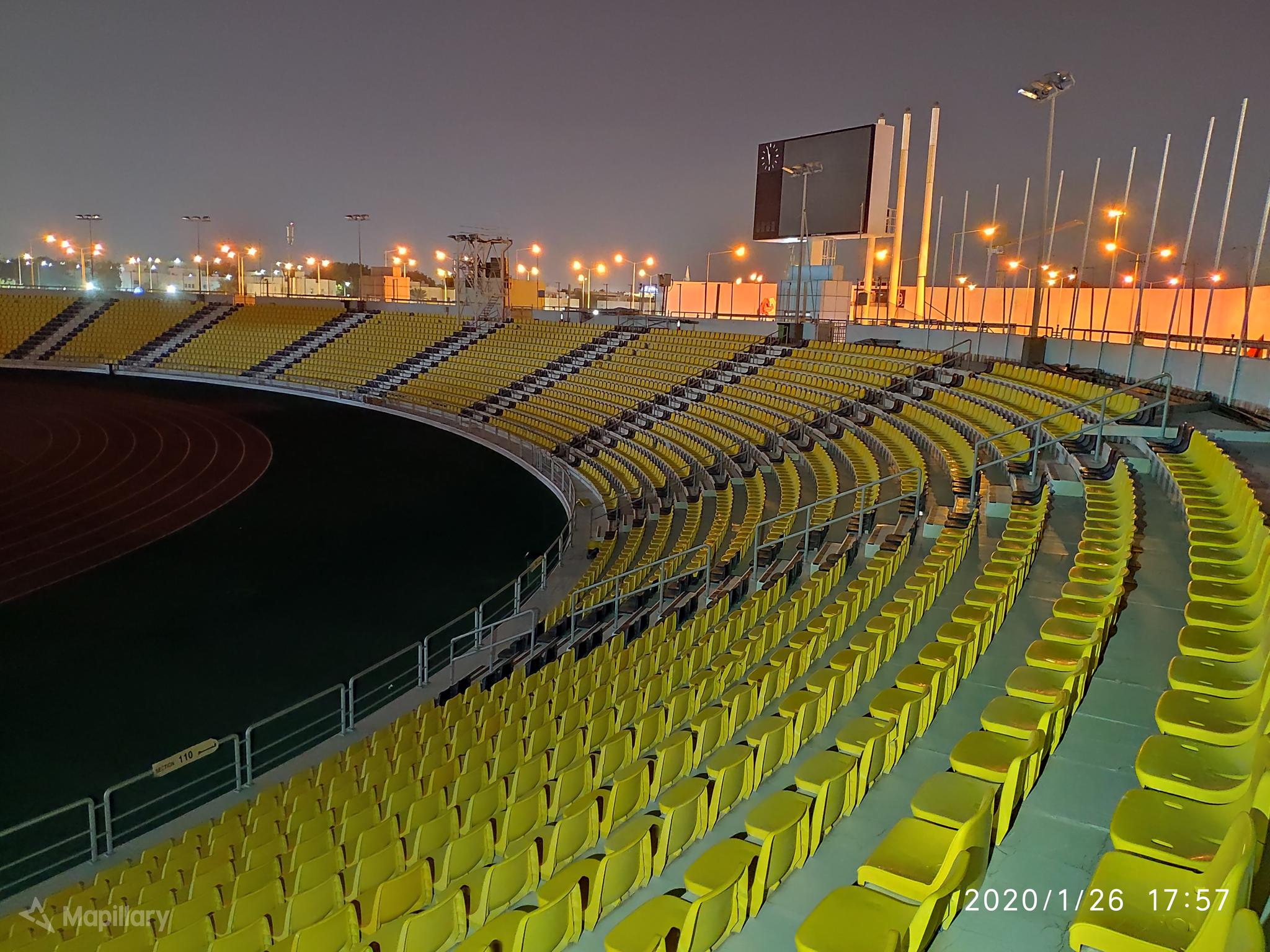
- Level: 2024 Diamond League

The 2024 Seashore Group Doha Diamond League was the 26th edition of the annual outdoor track and field meeting in Doha, Qatar. Held on 10 May at the Suheim bin Hamad Stadium, it was the third leg of the 2024 Diamond League – the highest level international track and field circuit. Beginning in 2024, it was sponsored by Seashore Group.

The meeting was highlighted by world leads from Kenny Bednarek and Alison Dos Santos, who ran the fastest 400 metres hurdles time set before June of any year. Some non-Diamond League events also served as the West Asian Athletics Championships for 2024.

== Diamond events results ==
Athletes competing in the Diamond League disciplines earned extra compensation and points which went towards qualifying for the 2024 Diamond League finals. First place earned 8 points, with each step down in place earning one less point than the previous, until no points are awarded in 9th place or lower. In the case of a tie, each tying athlete earns the full amount of points for the place.

=== Men's ===
200 Metres
Place	Athlete	Nation	Time	Points	Notes
1st place, gold medalist(s)	Kenny Bednarek	United States	19.67	8	MR, WL, PB
2nd place, silver medalist(s)	Courtney Lindsey	United States	20.01	7	
3rd place, bronze medalist(s)	Kyree King	United States	20.21	6	
4	Joseph Fahnbulleh	Liberia	20.26	5	
5	Aaron Brown	Canada	20.29	4	SB
6	Joshua Hartmann	Germany	20.36	3	SB
7	Andrew Hudson	Jamaica	20.53	2	SB
8	Ján Volko	Slovakia	21.23	1	SB
			Wind: (+1.7 m/s)		

400 Metres
Place	Athlete	Nation	Time	Points	Notes
1st place, gold medalist(s)	Steven Gardiner	Bahamas	44.76	8	
2nd place, silver medalist(s)	Muzala Samukonga	Zambia	45.07	7	SB
3rd place, bronze medalist(s)	Leungo Scotch	Botswana	45.29	6	
4	Vernon Norwood	United States	45.49	5	
5	Ammar Ibrahim	Qatar	45.57 [.562]	4	PB
6	Bayapo Ndori	Botswana	45.57 [.567]	3	
7	Quincy Hall	United States	45.98	2	SB
8	Ashraf Osman	Qatar	46.46	1	SB

1500 Metres
Place	Athlete	Nation	Time	Points	Notes
1st place, gold medalist(s)	Brian Komen	Kenya	3:32.43	8	
2nd place, silver medalist(s)	Timothy Cheruiyot	Kenya	3:32.67	7	SB
3rd place, bronze medalist(s)	Reynold Cheruiyot	Kenya	3:32.96	6	
4	Isaac Nader	Portugal	3:33.50	5	SB
5	Elliot Giles	Great Britain	3:33.61	4	SB
6	Narve Gilje Nordås	Norway	3:33.87	3	SB
7	Andrew Coscoran	Ireland	3:34.25	2	SB
8	Kieran Lumb	Canada	3:34.41	1	PB
9	Adel Mechaal	Spain	3:35.12		SB
10	Andreas Almgren	Sweden	3:35.22		SB
11	Samuel Tefera	Ethiopia	3:35.58		
12	Robert Farken	Germany	3:35.59		
13	Abel Kipsang	Kenya	3:35.67		SB
14	Abdirahman Saeed Hassan	Qatar	3:37.69		SB
—	Mounir Akbache	France	DNF		

400 Metres hurdles
Place	Athlete	Nation	Time	Points	Notes
1st place, gold medalist(s)	Alison dos Santos	Brazil	46.86	8	MR, WL
2nd place, silver medalist(s)	CJ Allen	United States	48.39	7	SB
3rd place, bronze medalist(s)	Wilfried Happio	France	49.10	6	SB
4	David Kendziera	United States	49.29	5	SB
5	Khallifah Rosser	United States	49.88	4	
6	Nick Smidt	Netherlands	49.97	3	SB
7	Ismail Abakar	Qatar	50.34	2	
8	Yasmani Copello	Turkey	50.97	1	SB

3000 Metres steeplechase
Place	Athlete	Nation	Time	Points	Notes
1st place, gold medalist(s)	Samuel Firewu	Ethiopia	8:07.25	8	WL, PB
2nd place, silver medalist(s)	Abraham Kibiwot	Kenya	8:07.38	7	SB
3rd place, bronze medalist(s)	Getnet Wale	Ethiopia	8:09.69	6	SB
4	Amos Serem	Kenya	8:12.74	5	SB
5	Ryuji Miura	Japan	8:13.96	4	SB
6	Daniel Arce	Spain	8:16.43	3	SB
7	Mohamed Amin Jhinaoui	Tunisia	8:17.56	2	SB
8	Simon Sundström	Sweden	8:19.45	1	SB
9	Isaac Updike	United States	8:20.86		SB
10	Mohamed Tindouft	Morocco	8:22.14		SB
11	Benjamin Kigen	Kenya	8:22.26		SB
12	Fernando Carro	Spain	8:22.50		SB
13	Ahmed Jaziri	Tunisia	8:30.16		SB
14	Abrham Sime	Ethiopia	8:39.39		
—	Abderrafia Bouassel	Morocco	DNF		
—	Wilberforce Chemiat Kones	Kenya	DNF		

Long jump
Place	Athlete	Nation	Distance	Points	Notes
1st place, gold medalist(s)	Carey McLeod	Jamaica	8.52 m (+5.2 m/s)	8	
2nd place, silver medalist(s)	Miltiadis Tentoglou	Greece	8.36 m (+1.9 m/s)	7	SB
3rd place, bronze medalist(s)	Simon Ehammer	Switzerland	8.30 m (+2.6 m/s)	6	
4	Simon Batz	Germany	8.13 m (+2.7 m/s)	5	
5	Tajay Gayle	Jamaica	8.01 m (+2.8 m/s)	4	
6	Radek Juška	Czech Republic	7.94 m (+3.0 m/s)	3	
7	Thobias Montler	Sweden	7.74 m (+1.4 m/s)	2	
8	LaQuan Nairn	Bahamas	7.59 m (+3.2 m/s)	1	
—	Will Williams	United States	NM		

Javelin throw
Place	Athlete	Nation	Distance	Points	Notes
1st place, gold medalist(s)	Jakub Vadlejch	Czech Republic	88.38 m	8	SB
2nd place, silver medalist(s)	Neeraj Chopra	India	88.36 m	7	SB
3rd place, bronze medalist(s)	Anderson Peters	Grenada	86.62 m	6	SB
4	Oliver Helander	Finland	83.99 m	5	SB
5	Andrian Mardare	Moldova	81.33 m	4	SB
6	Edis Matusevičius	Lithuania	80.05 m	3	SB
7	Genki Dean	Japan	79.34 m	2	SB
8	Julius Yego	Kenya	78.37 m	1	
9	Kishore Jena	India	76.31 m		SB
10	Curtis Thompson	United States	73.46 m		

=== Women's ===
100 Metres
Place	Athlete	Nation	Time	Points	Notes
1st place, gold medalist(s)	Daryll Neita	Great Britain	10.98	8	SB
2nd place, silver medalist(s)	Tamari Davis	United States	10.99	7	
3rd place, bronze medalist(s)	Celera Barnes	United States	11.02	6	SB
4	Amy Hunt	Great Britain	11.13	5	
5	Boglárka Takács	Hungary	11.17	4	SB
6	Kortnei Johnson	United States	11.29	3	=SB
7	Natasha Morrison	Jamaica	11.37	2	SB
8	Farzaneh Fasihi	Iran	11.71	1	SB
			Wind: (+2.0 m/s)		

800 Metres
Place	Athlete	Nation	Time	Points	Notes
1st place, gold medalist(s)	Mary Moraa	Kenya	1:57.91	8	SB
2nd place, silver medalist(s)	Jemma Reekie	Great Britain	1:58.42	7	
3rd place, bronze medalist(s)	Noélie Yarigo	Benin	1:58.70	6	SB
4	Habitam Alemu	Ethiopia	1:59.08	5	
5	Halimah Nakaayi	Uganda	1:59.48	4	
6	Natoya Goule-Toppin	Jamaica	1:59.74	3	SB
7	Elena Bellò	Italy	1:59.83	2	SB
8	Isabelle Boffey	Great Britain	2:01.03	1	
9	Alexandra Bell	Great Britain	2:01.56		
10	Anita Horvat	Slovenia	2:05.06		SB
—	Agata Kołakowska	Poland	DNF		

1500 Metres
Place	Athlete	Nation	Time	Points	Notes
1st place, gold medalist(s)	Freweyni Hailu	Ethiopia	4:00.42	8	
2nd place, silver medalist(s)	Jessica Hull	Australia	4:00.84	7	SB
3rd place, bronze medalist(s)	Nelly Chepchirchir	Kenya	4:01.19	6	SB
4	Worknesh Mesele	Ethiopia	4:01.25	5	
5	Hirut Meshesha	Ethiopia	4:03.22	4	
6	Georgia Hunter Bell	Great Britain	4:03.72	3	
7	Revée Walcott-Nolan	Great Britain	4:03.99	2	
8	Susan Ejore	Kenya	4:04.70	1	
9	Federica Del Buono	Italy	4:05.09		SB
10	Sarah Healy	Ireland	4:05.72		
11	Georgia Griffith	Australia	4:06.13		
12	Melissa Courtney-Bryant	Great Britain	4:08.46		SB
13	Saron Berhe	Ethiopia	4:09.62		
14	Abbey Caldwell	Australia	4:12.36		SB
—	Diribe Welteji	Ethiopia	DNF		
—	Aneta Lemiesz	Poland	DNF		

5000 Metres
Place	Athlete	Nation	Time	Points	Notes
1st place, gold medalist(s)	Beatrice Chebet	Kenya	14:26.98	8	WL
2nd place, silver medalist(s)	Ejgayehu Taye	Ethiopia	14:29.26	7	SB
3rd place, bronze medalist(s)	Medina Eisa	Ethiopia	14:34.11	6	SB
4	Melknat Wudu	Ethiopia	14:44.17	5	SB
5	Gela Hambese	Ethiopia	14:47.74	4	PB
6	Senayet Getachew	Ethiopia	14:52.97	3	
7	Aynadis Mebratu	Ethiopia	14:53.55	2	
8	Wubrist Aschal	Ethiopia	14:56.40	1	
9	Grace Nawowuna	Kenya	15:01.10		SB
10	Mekedes Alemeshete	Ethiopia	15:06.23		
11	Nozomi Tanaka	Japan	15:11.21		SB
12	Asayech Ayichew	Ethiopia	15:20.07		
13	Asmarech Anley	Ethiopia	15:55.04		
14	Elsabet Amare	Ethiopia	16:13.77		SB
—	Loice Chekwemoi	Uganda	DNF		
—	Lemlem Hailu	Ethiopia	DNF		
—	Christine Njoki Nalimo	Kenya	DNF		

100 Metres hurdles
Place	Athlete	Nation	Time	Points	Notes
1st place, gold medalist(s)	Ditaji Kambundji	Switzerland	12.49	8	SB
2nd place, silver medalist(s)	Tonea Marshall	United States	12.51	7	
3rd place, bronze medalist(s)	Pia Skrzyszowska	Poland	12.53	6	SB
4	Amber Hughes	United States	12.54	5	PB
5	Sarah Lavin	Ireland	12.73	4	SB
6	Emma Beiter Bomme	Denmark	14.03	3	
—	Alaysha Johnson	United States	DQ		
			Wind: (+1.7 m/s)		

High jump
Place	Athlete	Nation	Height	Points	Notes
1st place, gold medalist(s)	Angelina Topić	Serbia	1.94 m	8	
2nd place, silver medalist(s)	Iryna Herashchenko	Ukraine	1.91 m	7	SB
3rd place, bronze medalist(s)	Eleanor Patterson	Australia	1.91 m	6	
4	Lia Apostolovski	Slovenia	1.88 m	5	
5	Nadezhda Dubovitskaya	Kazakhstan	1.88 m	4	
6	Maja Nilsson	Sweden	1.88 m	3	
7	Morgan Lake	Great Britain	1.88 m	2	
8	Yuliya Levchenko	Ukraine	1.84 m	1	
9	Christina Honsel	Germany	1.84 m		
10	Nawal Meniker	France	1.84 m		

Pole vault
Place	Athlete	Nation	Height	Points	Notes
1st place, gold medalist(s)	Molly Caudery	Great Britain	4.73 m	8	
2nd place, silver medalist(s)	Nina Kennedy	Australia	4.73 m	7	SB
3rd place, bronze medalist(s)	Tina Šutej	Slovenia	4.63 m	6	
4	Bridget Williams	United States	4.63 m	5	
5	Katerina Stefanidi	Greece	4.63 m	4	
6	Sandi Morris	United States	4.53 m	3	
7	Gabriela Leon	United States	4.43 m	2	
—	Roberta Bruni	Italy	NM		

== Promotional events results ==
=== Men's ===
Discus throw
Place	Athlete	Nation	Distance	Notes
1st place, gold medalist(s)	Kristjan Čeh	Slovenia	70.48 m	SB
2nd place, silver medalist(s)	Matthew Denny	Australia	69.02 m	
3rd place, bronze medalist(s)	Henrik Janssen	Germany	65.74 m	SB
4	Alin Firfirică	Romania	65.18 m	
5	Lukas Weißhaidinger	Austria	65.14 m	SB
6	Lawrence Okoye	Great Britain	64.95 m	SB
7	Sam Mattis	United States	64.33 m	
8	Moaaz Mohamed Ibrahim	Qatar	59.71 m	SB

== U20 events results ==
=== Men's ===
100 Metres
Place	Athlete	Nation	Time	Notes
1st place, gold medalist(s)	Salah Nur Ismail Yunis	Qatar	10.26	
2nd place, silver medalist(s)	Ali Sami Hassan	Qatar	10.40	
3rd place, bronze medalist(s)	Kendry L. Menéndez	Cuba	10.52	
4	Abdullah Othman Masoud	Qatar	10.54	
5	Jassim Tiamiu Jumaah	Qatar	10.93	
6	Aboubakar Idriss	Qatar	11.01	
7	Salem Hamad Jamal	Qatar	11.23	
8	Abdelrahman Mohamed Kamel	Qatar	11.49	
			Wind: (+3.7 m/s)	

=== Women's ===
100 Metres
Place	Athlete	Nation	Time	Notes
1st place, gold medalist(s)	Dana Nour	Qatar	12.35	
2nd place, silver medalist(s)	Alissar Saadellah	Qatar	12.94	
3rd place, bronze medalist(s)	Ines Hamed	Qatar	14.12	
4	Rooh Khalid Mohamed Ahmed Ali	Qatar	14.34	
5	Fatima Mohd Ziada Taha Abderazig	Qatar	14.73	
			Wind: (+3.1 m/s)	

== West Asian Championships results ==
=== Men's ===
100 Metres
Place	Athlete	Nation	Time	Notes
1st place, gold medalist(s)	Tamer Saleh	Lebanon	10.25	
2nd place, silver medalist(s)	Taha Hussein Yaseen	Iraq	10.41	
3rd place, bronze medalist(s)	Falah Abdulzahra Mahdi	Iraq	10.42	
4	Owaab Barrow	Qatar	10.44	
5	Amir Muhammad	Qatar	11.21	
			Wind: (+3.8 m/s)	

400 Metres
Place	Athlete	Nation	Time	Notes
Heat 1
1st place, gold medalist(s)	Yousef Karam	Kuwait	46.69	
2nd place, silver medalist(s)	Yasir Ali Mohammed al-Saadi	Iraq	47.73	
3rd place, bronze medalist(s)	Hamzah Abdulla Humaid Said al Jabri	Oman	48.45	
4	Amar Ebed Ebed	Qatar	48.97	
Heat 2
1st place, gold medalist(s)	Mohamad Merhe Mortada	Lebanon	48.04	
2nd place, silver medalist(s)	Hussein Ibrahim Issaka	Qatar	48.86	

800 Metres
Place	Athlete	Nation	Time	Notes
1st place, gold medalist(s)	Sobhan Ahmadi	Iran	1:48.92	
2nd place, silver medalist(s)	Zakaria al Alhlami	Qatar	1:49.98	
3rd place, bronze medalist(s)	Noureddine Adel Merzah	Iraq	1:50.17	
4	Sami Masoud al Yami	Saudi Arabia	1:50.27	
5	Ihab Jabbar Hashi Hashim	Iraq	1:51.23	
6	Fayez Alsubaie	Saudi Arabia	1:51.34	
7	Mubarak al Yafaee	Yemen	1:54.05	
8	Mohammed al-Suleimani	Oman	1:54.39	
9	Samer Al-Yafaee	Yemen	2:00.72	
—	Qader Al-Alwani	Yemen	DNF	

400 Metres Hurdles
Place	Athlete	Nation	Time	Notes
1st place, gold medalist(s)	Marc Anthony Ibrahim	Lebanon	49.84	
2nd place, silver medalist(s)	Mehdi Pirjahan	Iran	50.60	
3rd place, bronze medalist(s)	Ahmed Jamal Aldirawi	Iraq	51.69	

=== Women's ===
400 Metres
Place	Athlete	Nation	Time	Notes
1st place, gold medalist(s)	Lucia Moris	South Sudan	56.83	
2nd place, silver medalist(s)	Gretta Taslakian	Lebanon	58.36	
3rd place, bronze medalist(s)	Maria Nohra	Lebanon	58.36	
4	Ghofrane Mohammad	Syria	1:00.74	
5	Hanaa al Qassimi	Oman	1:01.96	

== See also ==
- 2024 Diamond League
