= 2010 Doha Diamond League =

- Dates: 14 May 2010
- Host city: Doha, Qatar
- Venue: Suheim bin Hamad Stadium
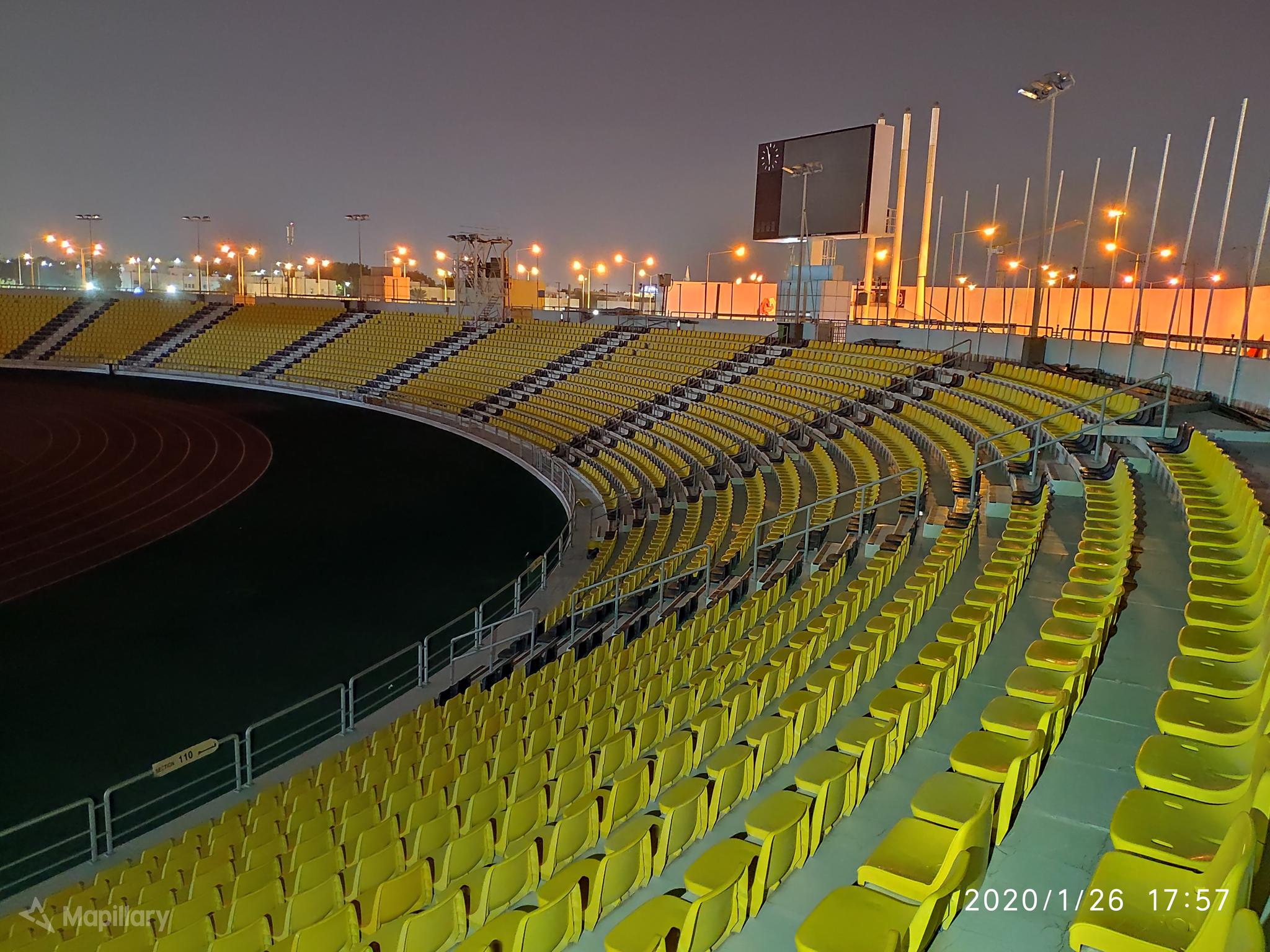
- Level: 2010 Diamond League

The 2010 Doha Diamond League was the 12th edition of the annual outdoor track and field meeting in Doha, Qatar. Held on 14 May at Suheim bin Hamad Stadium, it was the opening leg of the 2010 Diamond League – the highest level international track and field circuit.

== Diamond discipline results ==
Podium finishers earned points towards a season leaderboard (4-2-1 respectively), points per event were then doubled in the Diamond League Finals. Athletes had to take part in the Diamond race during the finals to be eligible to win the Diamond trophy which is awarded to the athlete with the most points at the end of the season.

=== Men's ===
100 metres - Heats
Rank	Athlete	Nation	Time	Notes
Heat 1
1	Michael Frater	Jamaica	9.97	Q
2	Lerone Clarke	Jamaica	9.98	Q
3	Simone Collio	Italy	10.11	Q
4	Travis Padgett	United States	10.12	q
5	Omar Juma Al-Salfa	United Arab Emirates	10.35	
6	Yahya Habeeb	Saudi Arabia	10.39	
			Wind: (+2.9 m/s)	
Heat 2
1	Asafa Powell	Jamaica	9.75	Q
2	Jaysuma Saidy Ndure	Norway	9.98	Q
3	Nesta Carter	Jamaica	10.03	Q
4	Monzavous Edwards	United States	10.04	q
~~5~~	~~Samuel Francis~~	~~Qatar~~	~~10.16~~	DQ (Note: Due to doping violations Francis' results during this competition were disqualified.)
6	Roberto Donati	Italy	10.50	
			Wind: (+2.6 m/s)	

100 Metres
Rank	Athlete	Nation	Time	Points	Notes
1st place, gold medalist(s)	Asafa Powell	Jamaica	9.81	4	
2nd place, silver medalist(s)	Nesta Carter	Jamaica	9.88	2	
3rd place, bronze medalist(s)	Travis Padgett	United States	9.92	1	
4	Michael Frater	Jamaica	9.94		
5	Lerone Clarke	Jamaica	9.98		
6	Jaysuma Saidy Ndure	Norway	10.00		
7	Monzavous Edwards	United States	10.09		
—	Simone Collio	Italy	DNF		
			Wind: (+2.3 m/s)		

800 Metres
Rank	Athlete	Nation	Time	Points	Notes
1st place, gold medalist(s)	David Rudisha	Kenya	1:43.00	4	MR, WL
2nd place, silver medalist(s)	Asbel Kiprop	Kenya	1:43.45	2	
3rd place, bronze medalist(s)	Amine Laâlou	Morocco	1:43.71	1	
4	Mbulaeni Mulaudzi	South Africa	1:43.78		SB
5	Yeimer López	Cuba	1:44.18		SB
6	Michael Rimmer	Great Britain	1:45.96		SB
7	Hamza Driouch	Qatar	1:47.05		PB
8	Musaeb Abdulrahman Balla	Qatar	1:48.12		
9	Rizak Dirshe	Sweden	1:49.79		
10	Ismail Ahmed Ismail	Sudan	1:50.24		
—	Sammy Tangui	Kenya	DNF		

5000 Metres
Rank	Athlete	Nation	Time	Points	Notes
1st place, gold medalist(s)	Eliud Kipchoge	Kenya	12:51.21	4	MR, WL
2nd place, silver medalist(s)	Vincent Chepkok	Kenya	12:51.45	2	PB
3rd place, bronze medalist(s)	Imane Merga	Ethiopia	13:05.20	1	
~~4~~	~~Chakir Boujattaoui~~	~~Morocco~~	~~13:05.65~~		DQ (Note: Due to doping violations Boujattaoui's results during this competition were disqualified.)
5	Essa Ismail Rashed	Qatar	13:08.95		
6	Teklemariam Medhin	Eritrea	13:17.93		
7	Ahmad Hassan Abdullah	Qatar	13:18.97		
8	Abera Kuma	Ethiopia	13:20.78		
9	Joseph Ebuya	Kenya	13:32.81		
10	Daniel Kipchirchir Komen	Kenya	13:33.37		
11	Mark Kiptoo	Kenya	13:34.58		
12	Amanuel Mesel	Eritrea	13:49.36		
—	Tariku Bekele	Ethiopia	DNF		
—	Bethwell Birgen	Kenya	DNF		
—	Kamal Boulahfane	Algeria	DNF		
—	Dejen Gebremeskel	Ethiopia	DNF		
—	Ali Abdosh	Ethiopia	DNF		
—	Suleiman Simotwo	Kenya	DNF		PM

400 Metres hurdles
Rank	Athlete	Nation	Time	Points	Notes
1st place, gold medalist(s)	Bershawn Jackson	United States	48.66	4	
2nd place, silver medalist(s)	Kerron Clement	United States	48.82	2	
3rd place, bronze medalist(s)	L. J. van Zyl	South Africa	49.59	1	
4	Angelo Taylor	United States	49.66		
5	Omar Cisneros	Cuba	49.85		
6	Isa Phillips	Jamaica	50.25		
7	Michael Tinsley	United States	50.65		
8	Bandar al-Sharakili	Saudi Arabia	52.21		SB

3000 Metres steeplechase
Rank	Athlete	Nation	Time	Points	Notes
1st place, gold medalist(s)	Ezekiel Kemboi	Kenya	8:06.28	4	WL
2nd place, silver medalist(s)	Paul Kipsiele Koech	Kenya	8:06.69	2	
3rd place, bronze medalist(s)	Tarık Langat Akdağ	Kenya	8:09.12	1	PB
4	Richard Mateelong	Kenya	8:09.84		
5	Roba Gari	Ethiopia	8:10.29		NR
6	Elijah Kipterege	Kenya	8:14.29		
7	Silas Kosgei Kitum	Kenya	8:16.19		PB
8	Michael Kipyego	Kenya	8:16.46		
9	Ruben Ramolefi	South Africa	8:16.50		SB
10	Benjamin Kiplagat	Uganda	8:17.46		
11	Brimin Kipruto	Kenya	8:18.13		
12	Linus Chumba	Kenya	8:21.47		
13	Tareq Mubarak Taher	Bahrain	8:27.91		
14	Wesley Kiprotich	Kenya	8:28.93		
15	Ali Al-Amri	Saudi Arabia	8:40.32		SB
16	Rabia Makhloufi	Algeria	8:46.47		
—	David Langat	Kenya	DNF		PM

Triple jump
Rank	Athlete	Nation	Distance	Points	Notes
1st place, gold medalist(s)	Alexis Copello	Cuba	17.47 m (+1.7 m/s)	4	MR, WL
2nd place, silver medalist(s)	Arnie David Giralt	Cuba	17.29 m (+0.9 m/s)	2	
3rd place, bronze medalist(s)	Yoandri Betanzos	Cuba	17.22 m (+1.3 m/s)	1	
4	Leevan Sands	Bahamas	16.80 m (+1.5 m/s)		SB
5	Dmitrij Vaľukevič	Slovakia	16.57 m (+1.3 m/s)		
6	Fabrizio Schembri	Italy	16.49 m (+2.1 m/s)		
7	Tumelo Thagane	South Africa	16.44 m (+1.1 m/s)		
8	Randy Lewis	Grenada	16.17 m (+2.3 m/s)		

Shot put
Rank	Athlete	Nation	Distance	Distance	Notes
1st place, gold medalist(s)	Christian Cantwell	United States	21.82 m	4	MR, WL
2nd place, silver medalist(s)	Ralf Bartels	Germany	21.14 m	2	
3rd place, bronze medalist(s)	Reese Hoffa	United States	21.00 m	1	
4	Dylan Armstrong	Canada	20.79 m		
5	Tomasz Majewski	Poland	20.39 m		
6	Dan Taylor	United States	20.22 m		SB
7	Maksim Sidorov	Russia	19.63 m		SB
8	Sultan Al-Hebshi	Saudi Arabia	19.40 m		SB
9	Māris Urtāns	Latvia	18.89 m		
10	Khalid Habash Al-Suwaidi	Qatar	18.03 m		

=== Women's ===
200 Metres
Rank	Athlete	Nation	Time	Points	Notes
1st place, gold medalist(s)	Kerron Stewart	Jamaica	22.34	4	
2nd place, silver medalist(s)	Sherone Simpson	Jamaica	22.64	2	
3rd place, bronze medalist(s)	Cydonie Mothersille	Cayman Islands	22.66	1	
4	Sheri-Ann Brooks	Jamaica	22.73		
5	Anneisha McLaughlin-Whilby	Jamaica	22.93		
6	Natalie Knight	United States	23.22		
7	Yuliya Gushchina	Russia	23.26		
8	Bianca Knight	United States	23.50		
			Wind: (+3.0 m/s)		

400 Metres
Rank	Athlete	Nation	Time	Points	Notes
1st place, gold medalist(s)	Allyson Felix	United States	50.15	4	WL
2nd place, silver medalist(s)	Amantle Montsho	Botswana	50.34	2	SB
3rd place, bronze medalist(s)	Novlene Williams-Mills	Jamaica	50.50	1	
4	Debbie Dunn	United States	50.85		SB
5	Christine Ohuruogu	Great Britain	50.88		SB
6	Shericka Williams	Jamaica	51.11		
7	Monica Hargrove	United States	51.87		
8	Christine Day	Jamaica	52.95		

1500 Metres
Rank	Athlete	Nation	Time	Points	Notes
1st place, gold medalist(s)	Nancy Langat	Kenya	4:01.63	4	
2nd place, silver medalist(s)	Gelete Burka	Ethiopia	4:02.16	2	
3rd place, bronze medalist(s)	Siham Hilali	Morocco	4:03.89	1	
4	Btissam Lakhouad	Morocco	4:04.23		
5	Viola Kibiwot	Kenya	4:05.63		
6	Ingvill Måkestad Bovim	Norway	4:06.08		
7	Genzebe Dibaba	Ethiopia	4:06.10		
8	Stephanie Twell	Great Britain	4:06.10		
9	René Kalmer	South Africa	4:07.89		
10	Maryam Yusuf Jamal	Bahrain	4:09.25		
11	Mimi Belete	Bahrain	4:10.98		
12	Hind Dehiba	France	4:17.83		
—	Tamara Tverdostup	Ukraine	DNF		

100 Metres hurdles
Rank	Athlete	Nation	Time	Points	Notes
1st place, gold medalist(s)	Lolo Jones	United States	12.63	4	
2nd place, silver medalist(s)	Priscilla Lopes-Schliep	Canada	12.67	2	
3rd place, bronze medalist(s)	Ginnie Crawford	United States	12.70	1	
4	Perdita Felicien	Canada	12.73		
5	Danielle Carruthers	United States	12.74		
6	Delloreen Ennis-London	Jamaica	12.75		
7	Dawn Harper-Nelson	United States	12.77		
8	Tiffany Porter	United States	12.87		
			Wind: (+2.7 m/s)		

High jump
Rank	Athlete	Nation	Height	Points	Notes
1st place, gold medalist(s)	Blanka Vlašić	Croatia	1.98 m	4	
2nd place, silver medalist(s)	Chaunté Lowe	United States	1.98 m	2	
3rd place, bronze medalist(s)	Ruth Beitia	Spain	1.94 m	1	
4	Svetlana Shkolina	Russia	1.90 m		
5	Emma Green	Sweden	1.85 m		
6	Nadiya Dusanova	Uzbekistan	1.85 m		
7	Viktoriya Klyugina	Russia	1.80 m		
—	Marina Aitova	Kazakhstan	NM		

Pole vault
Rank	Athlete	Nation	Height	Points	Notes
1st place, gold medalist(s)	Silke Spiegelburg	Germany	4.70 m	4	MR, WL
2nd place, silver medalist(s)	Tatyana Polnova	Russia	4.55 m	2	
3rd place, bronze medalist(s)	Jiřina Kudličková	Czech Republic	4.55 m	1	=PB
3rd place, bronze medalist(s)	Anna Rogowska	Poland	4.55 m		
5	Lacy Janson	United States	4.55 m		SB
6	Nikoleta Kyriakopoulou	Greece	4.55 m		=NR
7	Yuliya Golubchikova	Russia	4.45 m		
8	Kristina Gadschiew	Germany	4.30 m		
9	Carolin Hingst	Germany	4.10 m		

Discus throw
Rank	Athlete	Nation	Distance	Distance	Notes
1st place, gold medalist(s)	Yarelys Barrios	Cuba	64.90 m	4	
2nd place, silver medalist(s)	Dani Stevens	Australia	64.67 m	2	
3rd place, bronze medalist(s)	Sandra Elkasević	Croatia	62.33 m	1	
4	Aretha Thurmond	United States	62.26 m		SB
5	Nicoleta Grasu	Romania	61.63 m		SB
6	Věra Pospíšilová-Cechlová	Czech Republic	58.79 m		
7	Stephanie Brown Trafton	United States	54.14 m		
—	Yarisley Collado	Cuba	NM		

Javelin throw
Rank	Athlete	Nation	Distance	Points	Notes
1st place, gold medalist(s)	~~Mariya Abakumova~~	~~Russia~~	~~68.89 m~~	~~4~~	DQ (Note: Due to doping violations Abakumova's results during this competition were disqualified.)
2nd place, silver medalist(s)	Barbora Špotáková	Czech Republic	67.33 m	2	MR
3rd place, bronze medalist(s)	Martina Ratej	Slovenia	67.16 m	1	NR
4	Christina Obergföll	Germany	64.38 m		
5	Zahra Bani	Italy	57.29 m		
6	Ásdís Hjálmsdóttir	Iceland	54.74 m		
7	Maria Nicoleta Negoiță	Romania	54.21 m		
8	Elisabeth Pauer	Austria	52.97 m		

== See also ==
- 2010 Diamond League
