= 2015 Doha Diamond League =

- Dates: 15 May 2015
- Host city: Doha, Qatar
- Venue: Suheim bin Hamad Stadium
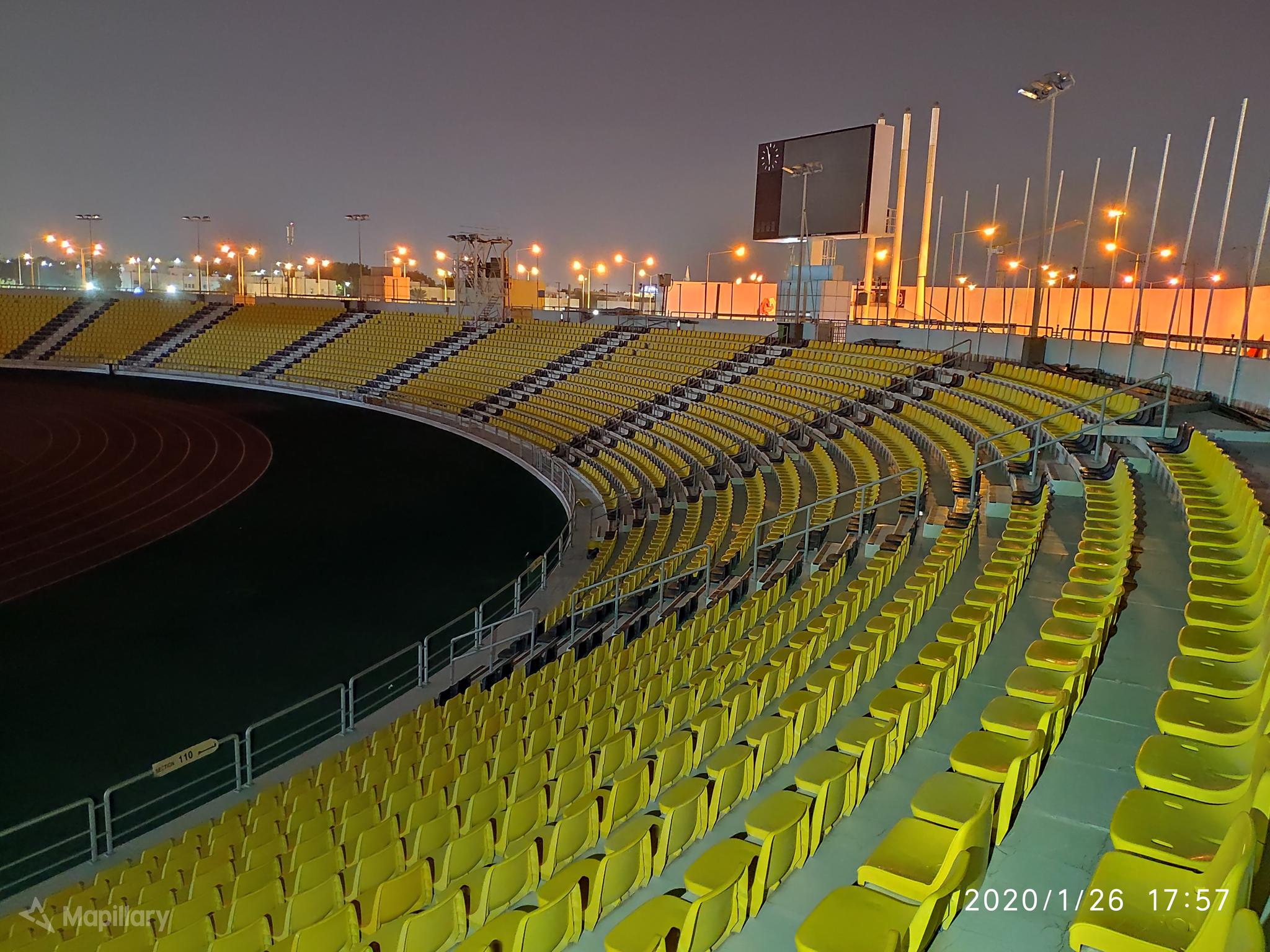
- Level: 2015 Diamond League

The 2015 Doha Diamond League was the 17th edition of the annual outdoor track and field meeting in Doha, Qatar. Held on 15 May at Suheim bin Hamad Stadium, it was the opening leg of the 2015 Diamond League – the highest level international track and field circuit.

== Diamond discipline results ==
Podium finishers earned points towards a season leaderboard (4-2-1 respectively), points per event were then doubled in the Diamond League Finals. Athletes had to take part in the Diamond race during the finals to be eligible to win the Diamond trophy which is awarded to the athlete with the most points at the end of the season.

=== Men's ===
100 Metres
Rank	Athlete	Nation	Time	Points	Notes
1st place, gold medalist(s)	Justin Gatlin	United States	9.74	4	MR, WL
2nd place, silver medalist(s)	Mike Rodgers	United States	9.96	2	SB
3rd place, bronze medalist(s)	Keston Bledman	Trinidad and Tobago	10.01	1	
4	Kim Collins	Saint Kitts and Nevis	10.03		SB
5	Femi Ogunode	Qatar	10.04		=SB
6	Nesta Carter	Jamaica	10.07		
7	Diondre Batson	United States	10.10		
8	James Dasaolu	Great Britain	10.14		
			Wind: (+0.9 m/s)		

800 Metres
Rank	Athlete	Nation	Time	Points	Notes
1st place, gold medalist(s)	Ayanleh Souleiman	Djibouti	1:43.78	4	WL
2nd place, silver medalist(s)	Ferguson Rotich	Kenya	1:44.53	2	SB
3rd place, bronze medalist(s)	Alfred Kipketer	Kenya	1:44.59	1	SB
4	Pierre-Ambroise Bosse	France	1:44.95		
5	Asbel Kiprop	Kenya	1:45.11		
6	Job Koech Kinyor	Kenya	1:45.12		
7	Jeremiah Kipkorir Mutai	Kenya	1:45.50		SB
8	Musaeb Abdulrahman Balla	Qatar	1:46.14		SB
9	Mohammed Aman	Ethiopia	1:47.38		
10	Jamal Hairane	Qatar	1:48.90		
—	Bram Som	Netherlands	DNF		PM

3000 Metres
Rank	Athlete	Nation	Time	Points	Notes
1st place, gold medalist(s)	Hagos Gebrhiwet	Ethiopia	7:38.08	4	WL
2nd place, silver medalist(s)	Mo Farah	Great Britain	7:38.22	2	
3rd place, bronze medalist(s)	Thomas Longosiwa	Kenya	7:39.22	1	
4	Imane Merga	Ethiopia	7:39.96		PB
5	Yomif Kejelcha	Ethiopia	7:39.99		
6	Isiah Koech	Kenya	7:40.39		
7	Edwin Soi	Kenya	7:41.69		
8	Benson Seurei	Bahrain	7:42.03		
9	Abrar Osman	Eritrea	7:44.59		
10	Yenew Alamirew	Ethiopia	7:46.23		
11	Albert Rop	Bahrain	7:46.36		
12	Henrik Ingebrigtsen	Norway	7:46.59		
13	Frederick Kipkosgei Kiptoo	Kenya	7:46.80		
14	Soufiyan Bouqantar	Morocco	7:50.14		
15	Phillip Kipyeko	Uganda	7:52.66		
16	Yasin Haji	Ethiopia	7:59.42		
—	Geofrey Barusei	Kenya	DNF		PM
—	Gideon Gathimba	Kenya	DNF		PM

400 Metres hurdles
Rank	Athlete	Nation	Time	Points	Notes
1st place, gold medalist(s)	Bershawn Jackson	United States	48.09	4	MR, WL
2nd place, silver medalist(s)	Javier Culson	Puerto Rico	48.96	2	SB
3rd place, bronze medalist(s)	Thomas Barr	Ireland	48.99	1	SB
4	Jack Green	Great Britain	49.31		SB
5	Jeffery Gibson	Bahamas	49.48		
6	L. J. van Zyl	South Africa	49.52		
7	Rasmus Mägi	Estonia	49.71		
8	Félix Sánchez	Dominican Republic	50.93		

Pole vault
Rank	Athlete	Nation	Height	Points	Notes
1st place, gold medalist(s)	Konstantinos Filippidis	Greece	5.75 m	4	SB
2nd place, silver medalist(s)	Carlo Paech	Germany	5.60 m	2	PB
3rd place, bronze medalist(s)	Germán Chiaraviglio	Argentina	5.60 m	1	
4	Tobias Scherbarth	Germany	5.50 m		SB
5	Piotr Lisek	Poland	5.50 m		
5	Ilya Mudrov	Russia	5.50 m		SB
7	Raphael Holzdeppe	Germany	5.40 m		
8	Edi Maia	Portugal	5.40 m		
—	Max Eaves	Great Britain	NM		
—	Anton Ivakin	Russia	NM		

Triple jump
Rank	Athlete	Nation	Distance	Points	Notes
1st place, gold medalist(s)	Pedro Pichardo	Cuba	18.06 m (+0.8 m/s)	4	DLR, MR, WL
2nd place, silver medalist(s)	Christian Taylor	United States	18.04 m (+0.8 m/s)	2	
3rd place, bronze medalist(s)	Teddy Tamgho	France	17.24 m (+0.7 m/s)	1	
4	Alexis Copello	Cuba	17.18 m (+2.1 m/s)		
5	Nelson Évora	Portugal	17.12 m (+1.3 m/s)		
6	Tosin Oke	Nigeria	16.83 m (+1.2 m/s)		
7	Aleksey Fyodorov	Russia	16.60 m (+1.1 m/s)		
8	Marian Oprea	Romania	16.36 m (+1.7 m/s)		
9	Pablo Torrijos	Spain	16.23 m (+0.9 m/s)		
Best wind-legal performances
—	Alexis Copello	Cuba	17.11 m (+0.8 m/s)		

Shot put
Rank	Athlete	Nation	Distance	Points	Notes
1st place, gold medalist(s)	David Storl	Germany	21.51 m	4	
2nd place, silver medalist(s)	Reese Hoffa	United States	21.30 m	2	SB
3rd place, bronze medalist(s)	Ryan Whiting	United States	21.06 m	1	
4	Joe Kovacs	United States	20.86 m		
5	Asmir Kolašinac	Serbia	20.44 m		
6	Germán Lauro	Argentina	20.26 m		
7	Borja Vivas	Spain	19.91 m		
8	O'Dayne Richards	Jamaica	19.89 m		
9	Kurt Roberts	United States	18.22 m		

Javelin throw
Rank	Athlete	Nation	Distance	Points	Notes
1st place, gold medalist(s)	Tero Pitkämäki	Finland	88.62 m	4	WL
2nd place, silver medalist(s)	Antti Ruuskanen	Finland	86.61 m	2	
3rd place, bronze medalist(s)	Vítězslav Veselý	Czech Republic	83.67 m	1	
4	Ihab Abdelrahman	Egypt	83.14 m		SB
5	Thomas Röhler	Germany	82.79 m		SB
6	Julius Yego	Kenya	81.98 m		
7	Hamish Peacock	Australia	81.66 m		
8	Keshorn Walcott	Trinidad and Tobago	80.68 m		
9	Dmitry Tarabin	Russia	79.38 m		
10	Kim Amb	Sweden	75.99 m		

=== Women's ===
200 Metres
Rank	Athlete	Nation	Time	Points	Notes
1st place, gold medalist(s)	Allyson Felix	United States	21.98	4	DLR, MR, WL
2nd place, silver medalist(s)	Murielle Ahouré-Demps	Ivory Coast	22.29	2	SB
3rd place, bronze medalist(s)	Anthonique Strachan	Bahamas	22.69	1	SB
4	Tiffany Townsend	United States	22.85		=SB
5	Shalonda Solomon	United States	22.91		
6	Bianca Williams	Great Britain	23.05		SB
7	Charonda Williams	United States	23.21		
8	Kaylin Whitney	United States	23.24		
			Wind: (+1.6 m/s)		

400 Metres
Rank	Athlete	Nation	Time	Points	Notes
1st place, gold medalist(s)	Francena McCorory	United States	50.21	4	
2nd place, silver medalist(s)	Sanya Richards-Ross	United States	50.79	2	
3rd place, bronze medalist(s)	Stephenie Ann McPherson	Jamaica	50.93	1	SB
4	Novlene Williams-Mills	Jamaica	51.28		
5	Natasha Hastings	United States	51.50		
6	Christine Day	Jamaica	51.53		SB
7	Kabange Mupopo	Zambia	51.88		SB
8	Libania Grenot	Italy	52.50		SB

1500 Metres
Rank	Athlete	Nation	Time	Points	Notes
1st place, gold medalist(s)	Dawit Seyaum	Ethiopia	4:00.96	4	WL
2nd place, silver medalist(s)	Sifan Hassan	Netherlands	4:01.40	2	
3rd place, bronze medalist(s)	Senbere Teferi	Ethiopia	4:01.86	1	PB
~~4~~	~~Anna Mishchenko~~	~~Ukraine~~	~~4:01.95~~		DQ (Note: Due to doping violations Mishchenko's results during this competition were disqualified.)
5	Luiza Gega	Albania	4:02.63		NR
6	Axumawit Embaye	Ethiopia	4:04.18		
7	Abeba Aregawi	Sweden	4:04.42		
8	Rababe Arafi	Morocco	4:05.11		SB
9	Gudaf Tsegay	Ethiopia	4:06.13		
10	Malika Akkaoui	Morocco	4:07.11		
11	Selah Jepleting Busienei	Kenya	4:08.81		PB
12	Renata Pliś	Poland	4:09.63		SB
13	Siham Hilali	Morocco	4:10.79		
14	Kristina Ugarova	Russia	4:17.36		
—	Lydia Wafula	Kenya	DNF		PM
—	Tamara Tverdostup	Ukraine	DNF		PM

100 Metres hurdles
Rank	Athlete	Nation	Time	Points	Notes
1st place, gold medalist(s)	Jasmin Stowers	United States	12.35	4	DLR, MR, WL
2nd place, silver medalist(s)	Sharika Nelvis	United States	12.54	2	PB
3rd place, bronze medalist(s)	Tiffany Porter	Great Britain	12.65	1	
4	Sally Pearson	Australia	12.69		
5	Queen Claye	United States	12.72		SB
6	Kristi Castlin	United States	12.80		
7	Tenaya Jones	United States	12.86		
8	Dawn Harper-Nelson	United States	13.24		
			Wind: (+0.9 m/s)		

3000 Metres steeplechase
Rank	Athlete	Nation	Time	Points	Notes
1st place, gold medalist(s)	Virginia Nyambura Nganga	Kenya	9:21.51	4	WL, PM
2nd place, silver medalist(s)	Hiwot Ayalew	Ethiopia	9:21.54	2	
3rd place, bronze medalist(s)	Hyvin Jepkemoi	Kenya	9:22.11	1	
4	Tigest Getent	Bahrain	9:27.07		PB
5	Lydiah Chepkurui	Kenya	9:27.62		
6	Madeline Heiner	Australia	9:28.41		PB
7	Sofia Assefa	Ethiopia	9:35.32		
8	Daisy Jepkemei	Kenya	9:38.16		PB
9	Salima El Ouali Alami	Morocco	9:38.28		
10	Buzuayehu Mohamed	Ethiopia	9:40.44		
11	Aisha Praught-Leer	United States	9:40.48		
12	Purity Cherotich Kirui	Kenya	9:40.49		
13	Birtukan Adamu	Ethiopia	9:41.91		
14	Joan Kipkemoi	Kenya	9:42.77		
15	Amina Bettiche	Algeria	9:42.97		
16	Sviatlana Kudzelich	Belarus	9:51.54		

High jump
Rank	Athlete	Nation	Height	Points	Notes
1st place, gold medalist(s)	Airinė Palšytė	Lithuania	1.94 m	4	
2nd place, silver medalist(s)	Irina Gordeeva	Russia	1.94 m	2	
3rd place, bronze medalist(s)	Isobel Pooley	Great Britain	1.91 m	1	
4	Ana Šimić	Croatia	1.91 m		SB
5	Levern Spencer	Saint Lucia	1.91 m		
6	Justyna Kasprzycka	Poland	1.91 m		
7	Ruth Beitia	Spain	1.88 m		
8	Oksana Okunyeva	Ukraine	1.85 m		
8	Svetlana Radzivil	Uzbekistan	1.85 m		
8	Barbara Szabó	Hungary	1.85 m		SB

Long jump
Rank	Athlete	Nation	Distance	Points	Notes
1st place, gold medalist(s)	Tianna Bartoletta	United States	6.99 m (+0.6 m/s)	4	WL
2nd place, silver medalist(s)	Shara Proctor	Great Britain	6.95 m (+0.7 m/s)	2	NR
3rd place, bronze medalist(s)	Christabel Nettey	Canada	6.93 m (+0.5 m/s)	1	
4	Lorraine Ugen	Great Britain	6.92 m (+0.3 m/s)		SB
5	Brittney Reese	United States	6.76 m (+0.5 m/s)		
6	Ivana Španović	Serbia	6.76 m (+0.6 m/s)		
7	Darya Klishina	Russia	6.75 m (+1.0 m/s)		SB
8	Erica Jarder	Sweden	6.53 m (+0.3 m/s)		
9	Funmi Jimoh	United States	6.36 m (+1.5 m/s)		
10	Melanie Bauschke	Germany	6.32 m (+0.9 m/s)		

Discus throw
Rank	Athlete	Nation	Distance	Points	Notes
1st place, gold medalist(s)	Sandra Elkasević	Croatia	68.10 m	4	
2nd place, silver medalist(s)	Nadine Müller	Germany	65.13 m	2	
3rd place, bronze medalist(s)	Dani Stevens	Australia	64.45 m	1	
~~4~~	~~Yekaterina Strokova~~	~~Russia~~	~~64.33 m~~		DQ (Note: Due to doping violations Strokova's results during this competition were disqualified.)
5	Mélina Robert-Michon	France	62.45 m		
6	Żaneta Glanc	Poland	62.15 m		
7	Gia Lewis-Smallwood	United States	61.98 m		SB
8	Irina Rodrigues	Portugal	60.35 m		
9	Yaime Pérez	Cuba	60.19 m		
10	Zinaida Sendriūtė	Lithuania	56.98 m		

== See also ==
- 2015 Diamond League
