= Doha Diamond League =

Athletics tournament held in Qatar

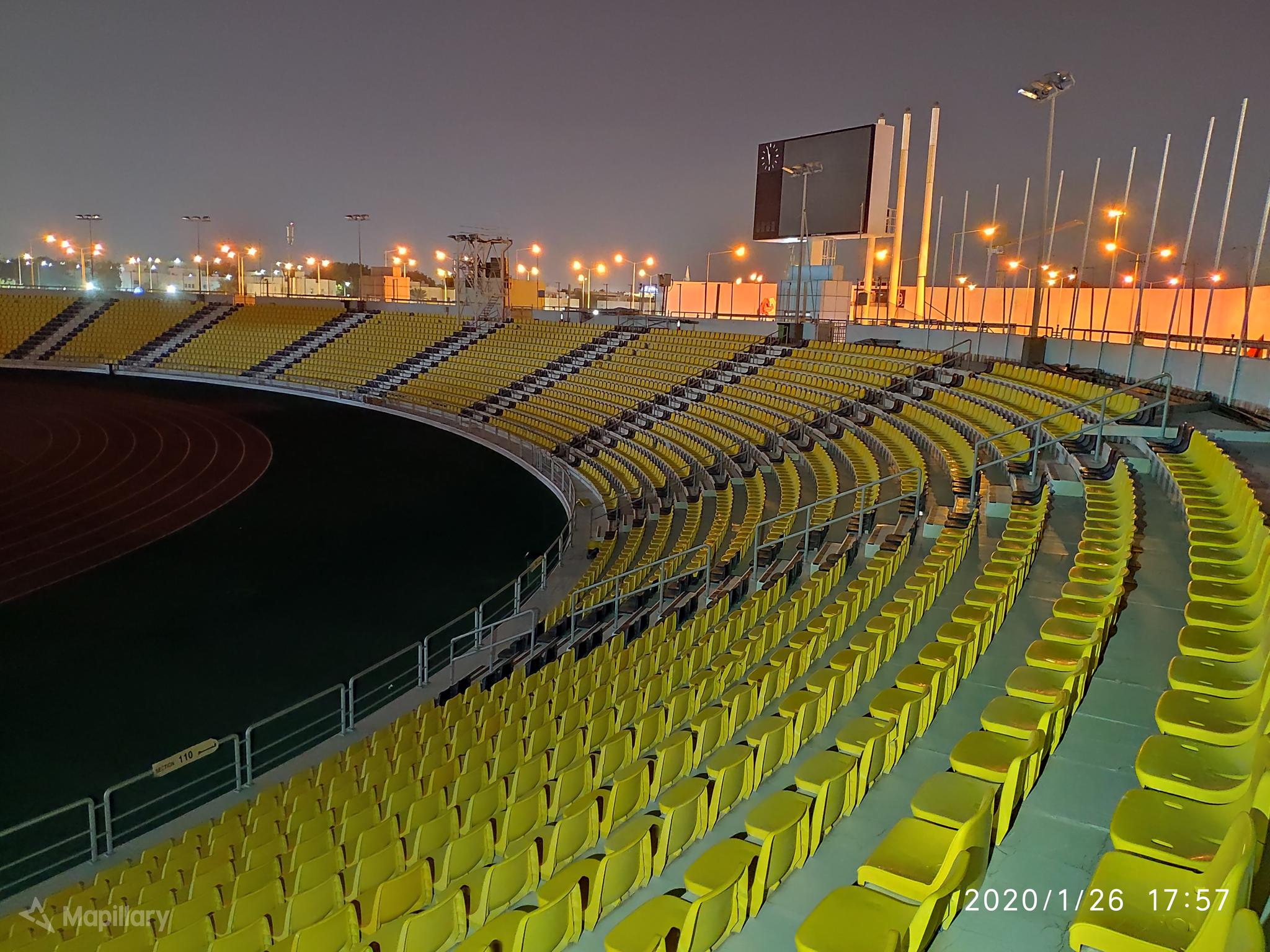
- The host stadium – Suheim bin Hamad Stadium
- Date: May
- Location: Doha, Qatar
- Event type: Track and field
- World Athletics Cat.: GW
- Established: 24 April 1997; 29 years ago
- Website: Diamond League Doha
- 2026 Doha Diamond League

The Doha Diamond League is an annual one-day track and field meeting held at the Suheim bin Hamad Stadium in Doha, Qatar. It is part of the Diamond League – the top level international circuit for the sport. It is typically held in May as the first leg of the Diamond League series.

It was first organized in 1997 as the Doha Grand Prix as a men's only programme before adding women's events the following year. The competition gained IAAF Grand Prix II status for its second edition in 1998, then Grand Prix I status in 1999, and became one of the five IAAF Super Grand Prix events in 2004. The name of the meeting has frequently changed to match the athletics series of which it is a part. The meeting was not held in 2000 (with the stadium holding the 2000 IAAF Grand Prix Final instead) and no meeting was held in Doha in 2003. The 2019 edition moved to Khalifa International Stadium. The 2020 edition will be spread across two days. The high jump will take place at the Katara Amphitheatre on 16 April 2020 while the main programme will return to the Qatar Sports Club on 17 April 2020.

== Editions ==
Doha Meeting editions
Ed.	Meeting name	Series	Date	Ref.
1st	1997 Doha Grand Prix		24 Apr 1997	
2nd	1998 Qatar International Athletic Meet	1998 IAAF Grand Prix II	7 May 1998	
3rd	1999 Doha IAAF Grand Prix I	1999 IAAF Grand Prix I	13 May 1999	
4th	2001 Qatar Athletic Grand Prix 1	2001 IAAF Grand Prix I	18 May 2001	
5th	2002 Qatar Athletic Grand Prix 1	2002 IAAF Grand Prix I	15 May 2002	
6th	2004 Qatar Athletic Super Grand Prix	2004 IAAF Super Grand Prix	14 May 2004	
7th	2005 Qatar Athletic Super Grand Prix	2005 IAAF Super Grand Prix	13 May 2005	
8th	2006 Qatar IAAF Super Tour	2006 IAAF Super Grand Prix	12 May 2006	
9th	2007 Qatar IAAF World Super Tour	2007 IAAF Super Grand Prix	11 May 2007	
10th	2008 Qatar Athletic Super Grand Prix	2008 IAAF Super Grand Prix	9 May 2008	
11th	2009 Qatar Athletic Super Grand Prix	2009 IAAF Super Grand Prix	8 May 2009	
12th	2010 Doha Diamond League	2010 Diamond League	14 May 2010	
13th	2011 Doha Diamond League	2011 Diamond League	6 May 2011	
14th	2012 Doha Diamond League	2012 Diamond League	11 May 2012	
15th	2013 Doha Diamond League	2013 Diamond League	10 May 2013	
16th	2014 Doha Diamond League	2014 Diamond League	9 May 2014	
17th	2015 Doha Diamond League	2015 Diamond League	15 May 2015	
18th	2016 Doha Diamond League	2016 Diamond League	6 May 2016	
19th	2017 Doha Diamond League	2017 Diamond League	5 May 2017	
20th	2018 Doha Diamond League	2018 Diamond League	4 May 2018	
21st	2019 Doha Diamond League	2019 Diamond League	3 May 2019	
22nd	2020 Doha Diamond League	2020 Diamond League	25 Sep 2020	
23rd	2021 Doha Diamond League	2021 Diamond League	28 May 2021	
24th	2022 Doha Diamond League	2022 Diamond League	13–14 May 2022	
25th	2023 Doha Diamond League	2023 Diamond League	5 May 2023	
26th	2024 Doha Diamond League	2024 Diamond League	10 May 2024	
27th	2025 Doha Diamond League	2025 Diamond League	16 May 2025	
28th	2026 Doha Diamond League	2026 Diamond League	19 Jun 2026	

== Events ==
Since the establishment of the Doha Meeting, there have been changes in the event programme every year compared to the previous year. The two diagrams below indicate which events took place each year.

Men's events
Year	100	200	400	800	1500	3000	5000	110 h	400 h	2000 sc	3000 sc	LJ	TJ	HJ	PV	Shot	Hammer	Discus	Javelin
1997	X	X	X		X	X		X	X					X	X	X			
1998	X	X	X	X	X	X		X	X			X		X	X	X			
1999	X		X	X	X	X		X	X		X	X			X			X	
2001		X		X	X	X		X			X	X						X	X
2002	X		X		X	X			X		X	X		X		X	X	X	
2004	X		X	X	X	X		X	X				X			X			X
2005	X		X	X	X	X		X	X	X			X			X			X
2006	X	X		X	X	X			X				X					X	X
2007	X	X		X	X	X		X					X			X		X	X
2008	X	X		X	X	X		X	X		X		X			X		X	X
2009	X			X	X	X		X			X		X			X			X
2010	X			X			X		X		X		X			X			
2011		X		X	X	X			X				X	X	X	X		X	X
2012	X	X	X	X	X	X					X	X		X				X	
2013	X			X	X	X			X				X	X	X	X			X
2014		X	X		X			X			X	X		X				X	
2015	X			X		X			X				X		X	X			X
2016		X	X		X			X			X		X	X				X	
2017	X		X		X	X			X				X	X					X
2018		X	X	X	X				X		X		X	X					X
2019		X		X	X						X				X	X		X	
2020		X	X	X	X			X							X				
2021		X	X	X	X				X					X		X			
2022		X		X	X				X		X			X	X				X
2023		X		X		X			X				X	X				X	X
2024		X	X		X				X		X	X						X	X
2025		X		X			X	X	X					X				X	X

Women's events
Year	100	200	400	800	1500	3000	5000	100 h	400 h	3000 s	LJ	TJ	HJ	PV	Shot	Hammer	Discus	Javelin
1997																		
1998	X		X		X			X									X	X
1999		X			X	X			X				X					
2001		X		X	X	X			X			X	X	X	X	X		
2002	X		X		X	X		X			X			X			X	
2004		X		X		X		X		X	X		X	X			X	
2005		X		X		X		X		X	X		X	X			X	
2006	X	X			X			X		X	X		X	X				
2007	X		X		X			X		X	X		X	X		X		
2008	X		X		X			X		X	X		X	X		X		
2009	X		X		X			X		X	X		X	X		X		
2010		X	X		X			X					X	X			X	X
2011		X	X		X			X		X	X							
2012	X			X		X		X	X			X		X	X			X
2013		X	X		X			X		X	X						X	
2014	X			X		X			X			X		X		X		X
2015		X	X		X			X		X	X		X				X	
2016	X			X		X			X			X		X	X			X
2017		X		X				X		X				X	X			
2018	X				X	X		X						X			X	
2019		X		X		X		X	X									
2020	X			X		X		X			X							
2021	X			X		X				X		X	X		X			
2022		X	X			X		X				X			X			
2023	X		X		X			X		X				X				
2024	X			X	X		X	X					X	X				
2025	X		X		X					X		X		X				

== Meeting records ==
=== Men ===
Men's meeting records of the Doha Diamond League
Event	Record	Athlete	Nationality	Date	Meet	Ref.
100 m	9.74 (+0.9 m/s)	Justin Gatlin	United States	15 May 2015	2015	
200 m	19.67 (+1.7 m/s)	Kenny Bednarek	United States	10 May 2024	2024	
400 m	43.87	Steven Gardiner	Bahamas	4 May 2018	2018	
800 m	1:43.00	David Rudisha	Kenya	14 May 2010	2010	
1500 m	3:29.18	Asbel Kiprop	Kenya	9 May 2014	2014	
3000 m	7:26.18	Lamecha Girma	Ethiopia	5 May 2023	2023	
5000 m	12:51.21	Eliud Kipchoge	Kenya	14 May 2010	2010	
110 m hurdles	12.95	David Oliver	United States	9 May 2008	2008	
400 m hurdles	46.86	Alison Dos Santos	Brazil	10 May 2024	2024	
2000 m steeplechase	5:14.53	Saif Saaeed Shaheen	Qatar	13 May 2005	2005	
3000 m steeplechase	7:56.58	Paul Kipsiele Koech	Kenya	11 May 2012	2012	
High jump	2.40 m	Mutaz Essa Barshim	QAT	9 May 2018	2018	
High jump	2.41 m X	Ivan Ukhov	Russia	9 May 2014	2014	
Pole vault	6.02 m	Armand Duplantis	Sweden	14 May 2022	2022	
Long jump	8.41 m (+1.8 m/s)	James Beckford	Jamaica	13 May 1999	1999	
Triple jump	18.06 m (+0.8 m/s)	Pedro Pablo Pichardo	Cuba	15 May 2015	2015	
Shot put	22.28 m	Ryan Whiting	United States	10 May 2013	2013	
Discus throw	70.89 m	Kristjan Čeh	Slovenia	5 May 2023	2023	
Hammer throw	83.33 m	Koji Murofushi	Japan	15 May 2002	2002	
Javelin throw	93.90 m DLR	Thomas Röhler	Germany	5 May 2017	2017	
4 × 400 m relay	3:02.29	Baboloki Thebe; Nijel Amos; Zacharia Kamberuka; Leaname Maotoanong	Botswana	6 May 2016	2016	

=== Women ===
Women's meeting records of the Doha Diamond League
Event	Record	Athlete	Nationality	Date	Meet	Ref.
100 m	10.76 (+0.9 m/s)	Sha'Carri Richardson	United States	5 May 2023	2023	
200 m	21.98 (+1.6 m/s)	Allyson Felix	United States	15 May 2015	2015	
200 m	21.98 (+1.3 m/s)	Gabby Thomas	United States	13 May 2022	2022	
400 m	48.91	Marileidy Paulino	Dominican Republic	19 June 2026	2026	
800 m	1:54.98	Caster Semenya	South Africa	3 May 2019	2019	
1500 m	3:56.60	Abeba Aregawi	Sweden	10 May 2013	2013	
3000 m	8:20.68	Hellen Obiri	Kenya	9 May 2014	2014	
5000 m	14:26.98	Beatrice Chepkoech	Kenya	10 May 2024	2024	
100 m hurdles	12.35 (+0.9 m/s)	Jasmin Stowers	United States	15 May 2015	2015	
400 m hurdles	52.30	Emma Zapletalová	Slovakia	19 June 2026	2026	
3000 m steeplechase	9:00.12	Hyvin Kiyeng Jepkemoi	Kenya	5 May 2017	2017	
High jump	2.05 m	Blanka Vlašić	Croatia	8 May 2009	2009	
Pole vault	4.84 m	Sandi Morris	United States	4 May 2018	2018	
Pole vault	4.84 m	Sandi Morris	United States	28 May 2021	2021	
Pole vault	4.84 m	Katie Nageotte	United States	28 May 2021	2021	
Long jump	7.25 m (+1.6 m/s) DLR	Brittney Reese	United States	10 May 2013	2013	
Triple jump	15.15 m (+2.0 m/s)	Yulimar Rojas	Venezuela	28 May 2021	2021	
Shot put	20.20 m	Valerie Adams	New Zealand	9 May 2014	2014	
Shot put	20.53 m X	Nadzeya Ostapchuk	Belarus	11 May 2012	2012	
Discus throw	71.38 m	Sandra Perković	Croatia	4 May 2018	2018	
Hammer throw	76.83 m	Kamila Skolimowska	Poland	11 May 2007	2007	
Javelin throw	67.33 m	Barbora Špotáková	Czech Republic	14 May 2010	2010	
Javelin throw	68.89 m X	Mariya Abakumova	Russia	14 May 2010	2010	
