= Suheim bin Hamad Stadium =

Sports venue in Doha, Qatar

- Nadi Qatar Stadium
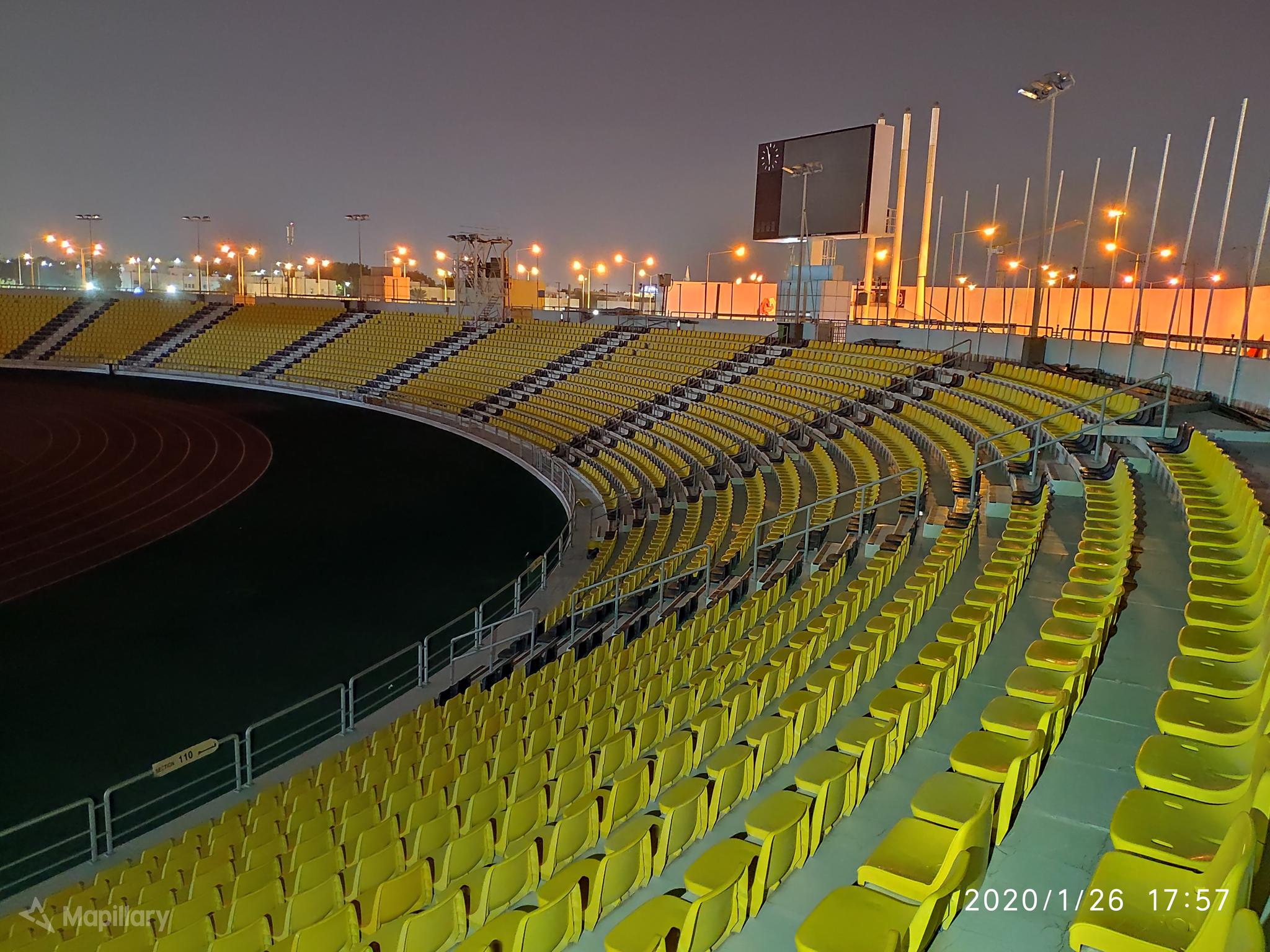
- Interactive map of Suheim bin Hamad Stadium
- Location: Doha, Qatar
- Coordinates: 25°19′02″N 51°30′45″E
- Owner: Qatar Sports Club
- Operator: Qatar Sports Club
- Capacity: 12,000
- Surface: Grass

Construction
- Opened: 1985; 2003
- Renovated: 2010

Tenant
- Qatar SC

The Suheim bin Hamad Stadium (Arabic: ملعب سحيم بن حمد), also known as Qatar SC Stadium, is a multi-purpose stadium in Doha, Qatar. Currently used mostly for football matches, it is home of the football team Qatar Sports Club.

== History ==
The stadium opened in 1985 and holds 12,000 people. The opening and closing ceremonies of the 2005 West Asian Games were held here. During the 2006 Asian Games, it served as one of five venues used for football matches. The stadium’s 1,050-capacity indoor hall hosted taekwondo, karate and judo matches. Both were renovated for the occasion.

In 2010, it hosted the Qatar Athletic Super Grand Prix, the first meeting of the 2010 Diamond League. Some of the matches from the 2011 AFC Asian Cup were held in this stadium. In March 2014, it was announced that the stadium would host the 2015 IPC Athletics World Championships.
