= 2024 Athletics Kenya Olympic Trials =

Athletics meeting in Kenya

- Dates: June 14–15, 2024
- Host city: Nairobi, Kenya
- Venue: Nyayo National Stadium

The 2024 Athletics Kenya Olympic Trials was an athletics meeting held by Athletics Kenya to select the Kenyan team in athletics at the 2024 Summer Olympics in Paris, France. The meeting was held June 14–15, 2024 in Nyayo National Stadium in Nairobi, Kenya. Unlike other countries' trials, the 2024 Kenyan trials did not also serve as that year's national championships – a separate Kenyan Athletics Championships was held earlier in May 2024. The top two qualified athletes per event were to be guaranteed Olympic team spots, and if there were multiple options for a third qualified athlete in any event, they were chosen via committee.

The first day was highlighted by Faith Kipyegon making her season debut to win the 5000 metres, reigning World Athletics Championships winner Mary Moraa losing the 800 m to Lilian Odira, and Reynold Cheruiyot winning the men's 1500 metres.

== Results ==
Men's 100 Metres Round 1 - Heat
Place	Athlete	Age	Country	Time	Heat
1	Mark Odhiambo	31	Kenya	10.26	1
2	Meshack Kitsubuli Babu	28	Kenya	10.31	1
3	Benson Okot	27	Uganda	10.70	1
4	Ronald Kiprono	23	Kenya	10.75	1
5	Richard Ogutu	33	Kenya	11.12	1
	Emmanuel Aboda	27	Uganda	DQ	1
1	Hesborn Ochieng	31	Kenya	10.44	2
2	Tyson Omondi Juma	25	Kenya	10.54	2
3	Sylvester Simiyu	20	Kenya	10.58	2
4	Charles Nyamwea	25	Kenya	10.70	2
5	Buom Buor Duoth		South Sudan	10.79	2
6	Simani Regau	22	Kenya	11.39	2
1	Ferdinand Omanyala	28	Kenya	10.09	3
2	Pius Adome	31	Uganda	10.70	3
3	Moses Wasike Onyango	29	Kenya	10.80	3
4	Elkana Sabila	25	Kenya	10.81	3
5	Solomon Obuto	31	Uganda	10.84	3
6	Justine Mogoi Isaboke	28	Kenya	10.85	3
7	Dennis Nyongesa	28	Kenya	10.87	3

Men's 100 Metres (+1.5 m/s)
Place	Athlete	Age	Country	Time
1st place, gold medalist(s)	Ferdinand Omanyala	28	Kenya	9.79
2nd place, silver medalist(s)	Mark Odhiambo	31	Kenya	10.12
3rd place, bronze medalist(s)	Meshack Kitsubuli Babu	28	Kenya	10.20
4	Hesborn Ochieng	31	Kenya	10.34
5	Tyson Omondi Juma	25	Kenya	10.48
6	Sylvester Simiyu	20	Kenya	10.52
7	Benson Okot	27	Uganda	10.53
8	Pius Adome	31	Uganda	10.55

Men's 200 Metres Round 1 - Heat
Place	Athlete	Age	Country	Time	Heat
1	Moses Wasike Onyango	29	Kenya	21.39	1
2	Dan Kiviasi	30	Kenya	21.54	1
3	Robin Wanjala Wateba	32	Kenya	21.61	1
1	Wiseman Mukhobe	26	Kenya	20.79	2
2	Samuel Chege Waweru	26	Kenya	20.86	2
3	Simani Regau	22	Kenya	21.36	2
1	Mike Nyang'au	27	Kenya	21.10	3
2	Ronald Kiprono	23	Kenya	21.15	3
3	Emmanuel Aboda	27	Uganda	21.23	3
4	Dennis Kiprono	17	Kenya	21.48	3
5	Eric Kimathi	25	Kenya	21.56	3
6	Dennis Nyongesa	28	Kenya	21.75	3
7	Edwin Omondi	21	Kenya	22.48	3

Men's 200 Metres (NWI m/s)
Place	Athlete	Age	Country	Time
1st place, gold medalist(s)	Samuel Chege Waweru	26	Kenya	20.61
2nd place, silver medalist(s)	Ronald Kiprono	23	Kenya	21.26
3rd place, bronze medalist(s)	Emmanuel Aboda	27	Uganda	21.37
4	Moses Wasike Onyango	29	Kenya	21.41
5	Simani Regau	22	Kenya	21.44

Men's 400 Metres Round 1 - Heat
Place	Athlete	Age	Country	Time	Heat
1	Kevin Kiprotich Tonui	26	Kenya	45.73	1
2	Kelvin Sane Tauta	23	Kenya	46.19	1
3	Joshua Wanyonyi	21	Kenya	46.20	1
4	Brian Onyari Tinega	21	Kenya	46.23	1
5	Collins Omae Gichana	35	Kenya	47.66	1
6	Elkanah Kiprotich Chemelil	20	Kenya	49.87	1
1	Kevin Kipkorir	29	Kenya	45.73	2
2	Boniface Mweresa	30	Kenya	45.96	2
3	Godfrey Chanwengo	24	Uganda	46.54	2
4	Nathaniel Kipngetich	29	Kenya	46.85	2
5	Emmanuel Korir	28	Kenya	47.42	2
6	Emmanuel Mutua	21	Kenya	50.11	2
7	Buom Buor Duoth		South Sudan	50.42	2
1	David Sanayek Kapirante	24	Kenya	45.58	3
2	Zablon Ekwam	26	Kenya	46.23	3
3	Erastus Mbaluka	27	Kenya	46.74	3
4	Kennedy Kimeu Muthoki	21	Kenya	47.41	3
5	Dunson Kibet	20	Kenya	48.68	3
6	Rodgers Ouma	27	Kenya	48.69	3
7	Yedjowk Acuuil Ayul		South Sudan	53.68	3

Men's 400 Metres
Place	Athlete	Age	Country	Time
1st place, gold medalist(s)	Kevin Kipkorir	29	Kenya	45.42
2nd place, silver medalist(s)	Boniface Mweresa	30	Kenya	45.68
3rd place, bronze medalist(s)	Kelvin Sane Tauta	23	Kenya	45.77
4	Joshua Wanyonyi	21	Kenya	46.29
5	Kevin Kiprotich Tonui	26	Kenya	46.50
6	Brian Onyari Tinega	21	Kenya	47.38

Men's 800 Metres Round 1 - Heat
Place	Athlete	Age	Country	Time	Heat
1	Ngeno Kipngetich	23	Kenya	1:46.94	1
2	Nicholas Kiplangat Kebenei	29	Kenya	1:47.04	1
3	Koitatoi Kidali	21	Kenya	1:47.19	1
4	Elias Ngeny	28	Kenya	1:48.16	1
5	Cornelius Tuwei	31	Kenya	1:48.18	1
6	Emmanuel Korir	28	Kenya	1:50.38	1
7	Abraham Thon	28	South Sudan	1:50.80	1
1	Laban Chepkwony	28	Kenya	1:46.21	2
2	Wyclife Kinyamal	26	Kenya	1:46.70	2
3	Festus Lagat	27	Kenya	1:47.99	2
4	Collins Kipruto	30	Kenya	1:48.03	2
5	Kelvin Kimutai Koech	17	Kenya	1:48.17	2
6	Emmanuel Wanyonyi	19	Kenya	1:51.76	2
1	Aaron Cheminingwa	25	Kenya	1:47.20	3
2	Kelvin Kimtai Loti	24	Kenya	1:47.35	3
3	Noah Kibet	20	Kenya	1:48.04	3
4	Ferguson Rotich	34	Kenya	1:49.15	3
5	Kelvin Kipyego	30	Kenya	1:50.68	3
6	Fabrice Iradukunda		Burundi	1:53.90	3

Men's 800 Metres
Place	Athlete	Age	Country	Time
1st place, gold medalist(s)	Emmanuel Wanyonyi	19	Kenya	1:41.70
2nd place, silver medalist(s)	Wyclife Kinyamal	26	Kenya	1:42.50
3rd place, bronze medalist(s)	Koitatoi Kidali	21	Kenya	1:42.66
4	Ngeno Kipngetich	23	Kenya	1:43.74
5	Aaron Cheminingwa	25	Kenya	1:44.51
6	Laban Chepkwony	28	Kenya	1:44.83
7	Festus Lagat	27	Kenya	1:45.16
8	Collins Kipruto	30	Kenya	1:45.97
9	Nicholas Kiplangat Kebenei	29	Kenya	1:46.29
10	Kelvin Kimtai Loti	24	Kenya	1:48.70

Men's 1500 Metres
Place	Athlete	Age	Country	Time
1st place, gold medalist(s)	Reynold Cheruiyot	19	Kenya	3:35.63
2nd place, silver medalist(s)	Daniel Munguti	29	Kenya	3:35.80
3rd place, bronze medalist(s)	Timothy Cheruiyot	28	Kenya	3:35.90
4	Charles Simotwo	29	Kenya	3:36.27
5	Brian Komen	25	Kenya	3:37.72
6	Mathew Kipchumba Kipsang	28	Kenya	3:38.42
7	Abel Kipsang	27	Kenya	3:38.63
8	Boaz Kiprugut	26	Kenya	3:41.40
9	Vincent Kibet Keter	22	Kenya	3:41.91
10	Kamar Etyang	21	Kenya	3:43.66
11	Ezekiel Letaya	24	Kenya	3:50.25

Men's 110 Metres Hurdles (+0.4 m/s)
Place	Athlete	Age	Country	Time
1st place, gold medalist(s)	Michael Nzuku	27	Kenya	14.49
2nd place, silver medalist(s)	Edwin Kipmutai Too	29	Kenya	15.16
	Gilbert Koech	34	Kenya	DQ

Men's High Jump
Place	Athlete	Age	Country	Mark
1st place, gold medalist(s)	Kemboi Asbel Kiprop	26	Kenya	2.10 m
2nd place, silver medalist(s)	Vincent Kipkoech	22	Kenya	1.90 m

Men's Triple Jump
Place	Athlete	Age	Country	Mark	Wind
1st place, gold medalist(s)	Gilbert Pkemoi	29	Kenya	15.17 m	-2.6 m/s
2nd place, silver medalist(s)	Isaac Kirwa	29	Kenya	14.78 m	-2.7 m/s

Men's Shot Put
Place	Athlete	Age	Country	Mark
1st place, gold medalist(s)	Peter Kamau Mwangi	40	Kenya	15.98 m
2nd place, silver medalist(s)	Benson Wachira Maina	32	Kenya	15.23 m
3rd place, bronze medalist(s)	Caleb Chepkwony	23	Kenya	14.90 m

Women's 100 Metres Round 1 - Heat
Place	Athlete	Age	Country	Time	Heat
1	Monica Safania	33	Kenya	12.23	1
2	Doreen Waka	29	Kenya	12.27	1
3	Lillian Dianah Aoko Owako	29	Kenya	12.49	1
4	Delisha Atyang	22	Kenya	12.79	1
1	Esther Mbagari	23	Kenya	11.70	2
2	Lucia Moris	23	South Sudan	11.96	2
3	Eunice Kadogo	30	Kenya	12.09	2
4	Ednah Ogendi	31	Kenya	12.82	2

Women's 100 Metres (+3.6 m/s)
Place	Athlete	Age	Country	Time
1st place, gold medalist(s)	Esther Mbagari	23	Kenya	11.50
2nd place, silver medalist(s)	Lucia Moris	23	South Sudan	11.68
3rd place, bronze medalist(s)	Monica Safania	33	Kenya	11.73
4	Doreen Waka	29	Kenya	11.96
5	Lillian Dianah Aoko Owako	29	Kenya	12.07
6	Ednah Ogendi	31	Kenya	12.32

Women's 400 Metres Round 1 - Heat
Place	Athlete	Age	Country	Time	Heat
1	Leni Shida	30	Uganda	52.01	1
2	Veronica Kamumbe Mutua	32	Kenya	52.10	1
3	Jackline Nanjala	23	Kenya	53.21	1
4	Joan Cherono	32	Kenya	55.33	1
5	Marion Jepchumba	16	Kenya	56.18	1
6	Janeth Jepkoech	23	Kenya	58.30	1
1	Mercy Chebet	22	Kenya	52.48	2
2	Maureen Nyatichi Thomas	26	Kenya	53.23	2
3	Gladys Mumbe	22	Kenya	55.63	2
4	Mercy Adijah	29	Kenya	56.28	2
5	Faith Moraa	24	Kenya	60.00	2

Women's 400 Metres
Place	Athlete	Age	Country	Time
1st place, gold medalist(s)	Veronica Kamumbe Mutua	32	Kenya	51.70
2nd place, silver medalist(s)	Leni Shida	30	Uganda	51.99
3rd place, bronze medalist(s)	Jackline Nanjala	23	Kenya	53.24
4	Joan Cherono	32	Kenya	53.55
5	Gladys Mumbe	22	Kenya	56.17
6	Marion Jepchumba	16	Kenya	56.54

Women's 800 Metres
Place	Athlete	Age	Country	Time
1st place, gold medalist(s)	Lilian Odira	25	Kenya	1:59.27
2nd place, silver medalist(s)	Mary Moraa	23	Kenya	1:59.35
3rd place, bronze medalist(s)	Sarah Moraa	18	Kenya	1:59.39
4	Naomi Korir	25	Kenya	1:59.72
5	Vivian Chebet Kiprotich	28	Kenya	2:00.44
6	Sylvia Chesebe	37	Kenya	2:02.17
7	Naumglorious Chepchumba	31	Kenya	2:08.70
8	Perina Lokure Nakang	21	Athlete Refugee Team	2:12.74
9	Mweni Kalimi	26	Kenya	2:13.03

Women's 5000 Metres
Place	Athlete	Age	Country	Time
1st place, gold medalist(s)	Faith Kipyegon	30	Kenya	14:46.28
2nd place, silver medalist(s)	Beatrice Chebet	24	Kenya	14:52.55
3rd place, bronze medalist(s)	Margaret Kipkemboi	31	Kenya	14:59.39
4	Janeth Chepngetich	25	Kenya	15:00.34
5	Joy Cheptoyek	22	Uganda	15:02.30
6	Caroline Nyaga	30	Kenya	15:04.95
7	Margaret Akidor	21	Kenya	15:16.58
8	Nelvin Jepkemboi	23–24	Kenya	15:26.44
9	Selah Jepleting Busienei	32	Kenya	15:27.15
10	Rebecca Mwangi	22	Kenya	15:36.07
11	Teresia Muthoni Gateri	22	Kenya	16:14.27

Women's 100 Metres Hurdles (-0.5 m/s)
Place	Athlete	Age	Country	Time
1st place, gold medalist(s)	Rukia Nusra Omulisia	22	Kenya	13.67
2nd place, silver medalist(s)	Gladys Ngure	28	Kenya	14.82
3rd place, bronze medalist(s)	Jane Chege	25	Kenya	15.04
4	Veronicah Chebet	34	Kenya	15.22

Women's 400 Metres Hurdles
Place	Athlete	Age	Country	Time
1st place, gold medalist(s)	Rahab Wanjriu Ndirangu	22	Kenya	1:01.01
2nd place, silver medalist(s)	Gladys Ngure	28	Kenya	1:01.64

Women's 3000 Metres Steeplechase
Place	Athlete	Age	Country	Time
1st place, gold medalist(s)	Faith Cherotich	19	Kenya	9:22.28
2nd place, silver medalist(s)	Beatrice Chepkoech	32	Kenya	9:22.76
3rd place, bronze medalist(s)	Jackline Chepkoech	20	Kenya	9:34.86
4	Diana Chepkemoi	17	Kenya	9:44.50
5	Leah Jeruto	24	Kenya	9:53.92
6	Mercy Wanjiru Gitahi	31	Kenya	9:57.37
7	Sharon Chepkemoi	17	Kenya	10:32.10
8	Faith Nduku	24	Kenya	10:51.01
9	Naomi Chemtai	17	Kenya	10:56.02
10	Maurine Talaam	21	Kenya	11:05.43

Men's 5000 Metres
Place	Athlete	Age	Country	Time
1st place, gold medalist(s)	Ronald Kwemoi	28	Kenya	13:27.20
2nd place, silver medalist(s)	Jacob Krop	23	Kenya	13:27.54
3rd place, bronze medalist(s)	Edwin Kurgat	28	Kenya	13:27.75
4	Emmanuel Korir Kiplagat	22	Kenya	13:28.09
5	Cornelius Kemboi	24	Kenya	13:29.73
6	Daniel Kimaiyo	19	Kenya	13:29.84
7	Ishmael Kipkurui	19	Kenya	13:34.79
8	Benson Kiplangat	20	Kenya	13:34.84
9	Richard Etir	20	Kenya	13:36.81
10	Samwel Chebolei Masai	23	Kenya	13:39.42
11	Gideon Kipkertich Rono	21	Kenya	13:41.32
12	Kiprono Sitonik	22	Kenya	13:41.46
13	Emmanuel Moi Maru	23	Kenya	13:47.42
14	Naibei Kiplimo Mayebei	24	Kenya	13:52.42
15	Kibet Kandie	28	Kenya	13:56.61
16	Francis Abong	28	Kenya	13:57.72
17	Athanas Kioko	29	Kenya	14:07.69
18	Victor Kipkirui Mutai	21	Kenya	14:19.22

Men's 400 Metres Hurdles
Place	Athlete	Age	Country	Time
1st place, gold medalist(s)	Wiseman Mukhobe	26	Kenya	48.72
2nd place, silver medalist(s)	Moitalel Naadokila	23	Kenya	49.92
3rd place, bronze medalist(s)	Kipkorir Rotich	26	Kenya	50.73
4	Peter Kithome Muthoka	21	Kenya	50.80
5	Michael Nzuku	27	Kenya	51.28
6	Edward Ngunjiri	31	Kenya	52.48

Men's 3000 Metres Steeplechase
Place	Athlete	Age	Country	Time
1st place, gold medalist(s)	Amos Serem	21	Kenya	8:20.55
2nd place, silver medalist(s)	Simon Koech	21	Kenya	8:20.99
3rd place, bronze medalist(s)	Abraham Kibiwot	28	Kenya	8:23.41
4	Edmund Serem	16	Kenya	8:24.50
5	Leonard Bett	23	Kenya	8:34.45
6	Matthew Kosgei	18	Kenya	8:35.76
7	Wesley Langat	29	Kenya	8:40.32
8	Benjamin Kigen	30	Kenya	8:43.20
9	Amos Kirui	26	Kenya	8:45.75
10	Conseslus Kipruto	29	Kenya	8:51.66
11	Geoffrey Kirwa	22	Kenya	8:54.21
12	Philip Korir	31	Kenya	8:56.32

Men's Long Jump
Place	Athlete	Age	Country	Mark	Wind
1st place, gold medalist(s)	Edwin Kipmutai Too	29	Kenya	7.55 m	+0.4 m/s
2nd place, silver medalist(s)	Kevin Wekesa	23	Kenya	7.26 m	-0.2 m/s

Men's Javelin Throw
Place	Athlete	Age	Country	Mark
1st place, gold medalist(s)	Julius Yego	35	Kenya	76.42 m
2nd place, silver medalist(s)	Methusellah Kiprop	32	Kenya	73.56 m
3rd place, bronze medalist(s)	Duncan Kinyanchui Mong'Are	28	Kenya	72.64 m
4	Alexander Kiprotich	29	Kenya	72.45 m

Men's 4×100 Metres Relay
Place	Athlete	Age	Country	Time
1st place, gold medalist(s)	Boniface Mweresa; Mike Nyang'au; Meshack Kitsubuli Babu; Ferdinand Omanyala		Kenya	38.61
2nd place, silver medalist(s)	Pius Adome; Solomon Obuto; Benson Okot; Emmanuel Aboda		Uganda	39.75
3rd place, bronze medalist(s)	Tyson Omondi Juma; Justine Mogoi Isaboke; Charles Nyamwea; Ronald Kiprono		Kenya	39.81
4	Thuto Masasa; Tumo Statago van Wyk; Calvin Bogosi Omphile; Jayson Game Mandoze		Botswana	40.10

Women's 200 Metres (-1.0 m/s)
Place	Athlete	Age	Country	Time
1st place, gold medalist(s)	Esther Mbagari	23	Kenya	23.69
2nd place, silver medalist(s)	Loice Nyanchoka Morara	22	Kenya	24.39
3rd place, bronze medalist(s)	Lillian Dianah Aoko Owako	29	Kenya	24.60
4	Diana Chebet	29	Kenya	25.32

Women's 1500 Metres
Place	Athlete	Age	Country	Time
1st place, gold medalist(s)	Faith Kipyegon	30	Kenya	3:53.98
2nd place, silver medalist(s)	Nelly Chepchirchir	21	Kenya	3:58.46
3rd place, bronze medalist(s)	Susan Ejore	28	Kenya	4:00.22
4	Edinah Jebitok	22	Kenya	4:04.23
5	Mary Ekiru	23	Kenya	4:05.91
6	Caroline Nyaga	30	Kenya	4:09.91
7	Purity Chepkirui	21	Kenya	4:15.33
8	Mirriam Cherop	24	Kenya	4:21.66
9	Winny Chebet	33	Kenya	4:23.08
10	Meryem Akda	31	Turkey	4:34.74

Mixed 4×400 Metres Relay
Place	Athlete	Age	Country	Time
1st place, gold medalist(s)	Zablon Ekwam; Mary Moraa; Kelvin Sane Tauta; Mercy Chebet		Kenya	3:11.88
2nd place, silver medalist(s)	Tumo Statago van Wyk; Obakeng Kamberuka; Boitumelo Masilo; Lydia Jele		Botswana	3:16.36
3rd place, bronze medalist(s)	Wiseman Mukhobe; Maureen Nyatichi Thomas; David Sanayek Kapirante; Veronica Kamumbe Mutua		Kenya	3:16.44
4	Kevin Kipkorir; Jackline Nanjala; Brian Onyari Tinega; Joan Cherono		Kenya	3:20.68
