= Timothy Cheruiyot =

Kenyan middle-distance runner

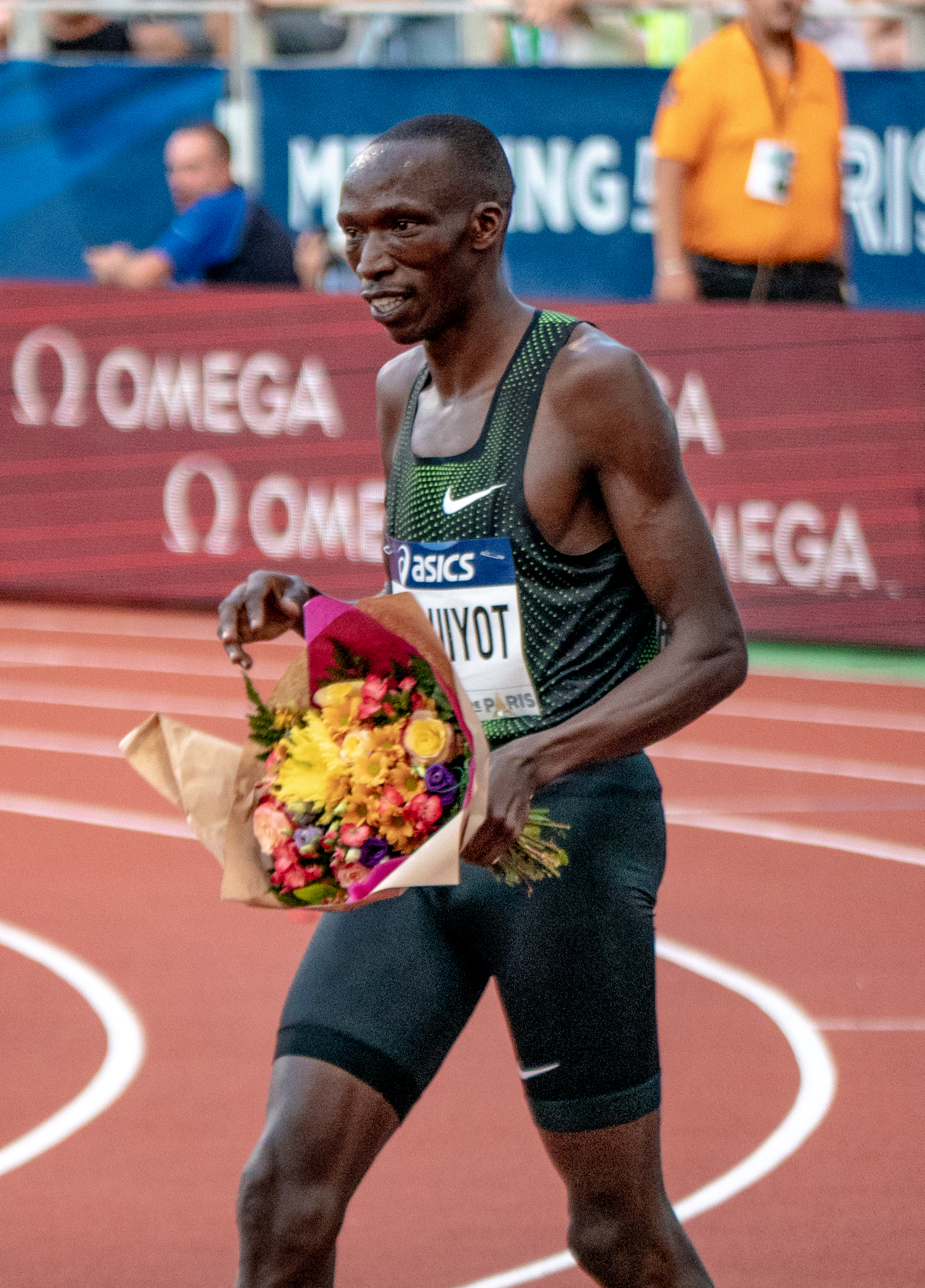
- Cheruiyot at the Paris Diamond League in 2018

Personal information
- Born: 20 November 1995 (age 31) Bomet, Kenya
- Height: 1.82 m (6 ft 0 in)
- Weight: 65 kg (143 lb)

Sport
- Country: Kenya
- Sport: Athletics
- Event: 1500 metres

Achievements and titles
- Personal bests: 800 m: 1:43.11 (Nairobi 2019); 1500 m: 3:28.28 (Monaco 2021); Mile: 3:47.39 (Eugene 2026); 2000 m: 5:03.05 (Nairobi 2020); 3000 m: 7:27.24 (Shanghai 2026); 5000 m: 13:16.41 (Xiamen 2026)
Medal record
Men's athletics
Representing Kenya
Olympic Games
Silver medal – second place	2020 Tokyo	1500 m
World Championships
Gold medal – first place	2019 Doha	1500 m
Silver medal – second place	2017 London	1500 m
Diamond League
First place	2017	1500 m
First place	2018	1500 m
First place	2019	1500 m
First place	2021	1500 m
Commonwealth Games
Silver medal – second place	2018 Gold Coast	1500 m
Silver medal – second place	2022 Birmingham	1500 m
Bronze medal – third place	2026 Glasgow	One Mile
African Championships
Silver medal – second place	2016 Durban	1500 m
Silver medal – second place	2018 Nigeria	1500 m

Timothy Cheruiyot (born 20 November 1995) is a Kenyan middle-distance runner specialising in the 1500 metres. He is the 2020 Tokyo Olympic silver medallist in the event and the 11th fastest athlete all time over the distance. At the World Athletics Championships, Cheruiyot won the silver medal in 2017 in London, and a gold in 2019 in Doha.

He took the silver medal in his specialty event at the 2018 and 2022 Commonwealth Games, and is also a two-time African Championship silver medallist from 2016 and 2018. Cheruiyot won the 1500 m Diamond League title on four occasions: in 2017, 2018, 2019, and 2021.

== Personal life and career ==
Cheruiyot is from the town of Singorwet, in Bomet County, Kenya, and lives on a farm with his family. Beginning in 2014, he began to train in the outskirts of Nairobi, via the Rongai Athletics Club, under Coach Bernard Ouma.

=== 2015 ===
Cheruiyot's first major milestone in his career was competing on Kenya's Distance Medley Relay (DMR) team at the 2015 IAAF World Relays in The Bahamas. Team Kenya's goal was to improve on their existing DMR world record of 9:15.56 set back in 2006, but the new world record ended up going to the United States, in a time of 9:15.50, while Kenya finished second in a time of 9:17.20. Cheruiyot anchored this DMR (1600 m leg) against the United States' Ben Blankenship.

Cheruiyot would have a rematch against Blankenship three weeks later at the Prefontaine Classic in Eugene, Oregon, in the men's International Mile. Blankenship won in a time of 3:55.72, while Cheruiyot finished 3rd in a time of 3:55.80.

Cheruiyot then switched attention to the 1500 m at the 2015 World Championships in Beijing. Here, he made it through the rounds and took 7th place in the final in a time of 3:36.05.

=== 2016 ===
In 2016, Cheruiyot won the 1500 m at the Rabat Diamond League, in a personal best time of 3:33.61. He also took a silver medal in the 1500m at the African Championships in Durban (3:39.71), and finished 2nd in the Emsley Carr Mile (3:53.17) at the Anniversary Games in London.

However, despite his successes, Cheruiyot took 4th place in the 1500 m final at the Kenyan Olympic Trials and was therefore unable to represent Kenya at the 2016 Rio Olympics.

Although disappointed by not making Kenya's Olympic Team, Cheruiyot had another breakthrough by winning the 1500 m at the Brussels Diamond League, in a personal best time of 3:31.34.

=== 2017: World Silver Medallist & First Diamond League Title ===
On 18 June, Cheruiyot won the 1500 m at the Stockholm Diamond League in a new personal best of 3:30.77. He followed it up by finishing second at the Kenyan World Championship Trials, qualifying him for the 2017 World Championships in London. On 21 July, Cheruiyot finished second at the Monaco Diamond League in 3:29.10, his first time under the 3:30-barrier.

At the aforementioned World Championships, Cheruiyot won the silver medal, finishing behind compatriot Elijah Manangoi. In his final race of the season, Cheruiyot won at the Diamond League Final in a time of 3:33.93.

=== 2018: Second Diamond League Title ===
At the Commonwealth Games held on the Gold Coast, Cheruiyot claimed the silver medal in the 1500 m. On 12 May, he won the Shanghai Diamond League in a time of 3:31.48. He continued his good form by winning the mile at the Prefontaine Classic in 3:49.87. He went on to win at the Monaco Diamond League on 20 July, running 3:28.41 - a time which would be the world lead for the 2018 season. Cheruiyot won at the Diamond League Final in Zurich, in a time of 3:30.27.

At the end of the season, Cheruiyot was nominated for World Athletics Male Athlete of the Year.

=== 2019: World Champion and Third Diamond League Title ===
On 30 June, Cheruiyot won the mile at the Prefontaine Classic in 3:50.49. He also won over 1500 m at the Laussane and Monaco Diamond Leagues in 3:28.77 and 3:29.97, respectively. On 22 August, Cheruiyot won the 800 m at the Kenyan National Championships, in a time of 1:43.11, his first time under the 1:44-barrier. He then won over 1500 m at the Kenyan World Championship Trials on 13 September to secure his place at the World Championships in Doha. At the World Championships, Cheruiyot won gold in the 1500 m. In a "superb display of dominance", he won by 2.12 s, the largest winning margin in World Championship 1500 m history.

=== 2020-2021: Covid Pandemic, Olympic Silver Medal, Fourth Diamond League Title ===
After the COVID-19 pandemic disrupted the 2020 season, Cheruiyot was forced to compete less frequently. He won the Kenyan race over 2000 m at the Impossible Games, beating Elijah Manangoi. However, he lost the overall race to "Team Ingebrigtsen" who were competing in Oslo. He set the world lead for the 2020 season at the Monaco Diamond League, running 3:28.47.

In 2021, Cheruiyot opened his season by winning the Doha Diamond League in 3:30.48. He finished a shock fourth at the Kenyan Olympic Trials, failing to qualify for the Olympics. However, he was allowed to compete as second-placer Kamar Etyang was barred for participating due to not meeting anti-doping rules. He recovered from his upset to win at the Stockholm Diamond League in 3:32.40. He also picked up the win at the Monaco Diamond League, setting a new personal best of 3:28.28.

At the Tokyo Olympics, Cheruiyot won silver in the 1500 m. Cheruiyot led for the majority of the race, however was overtaken by Jakob Ingebrigtsen on the final turn. He held off the fast-finishing Josh Kerr who took bronze. He ended his season by winning the Diamond League Final in Zurich with a time of 3:31.27.

=== 2022: Commonwealth Silver Medal ===
Cheruiyot began his 2022 season with a 2nd-placed finish at the Doha Diamond League and a 3rd-placed finished over the mile at the Prefontaine Classic. He finished second at the Kenyan World Championship Trials to qualify for the 2022 World Championships, where he finished sixth in a season's best of 3:30.69.

At the 2022 Commonwealth Games in Birmingham, Cheruiyot won the silver medal behind Ollie Hoare in a time of 3:30.21. He was unable to win his fifth successive Diamond League title as he finished second at the Diamond League Final on 8 September.

=== 2023 ===
Cheruiyot opened his 2023 season with a 3,000 m race at the Doha Diamond League, finishing 5th in a time of 7:36.72. He returned to winning ways over 1500 m at the Los Angeles Grand Prix, running 3:31.47. On 15 June, Cheruiyot competed at the Oslo Diamond League, running a season's best of 3:29.08 to finish fourth. After winning the Kenyan World Championship Trials in a sprint finish, Cheruiyot was named in the team for the World Championships.

At the 2023 World Championships in Budapest, Cheruiyot was eliminated in the semi-finals of the 1500 m. After the Championships, he revealed he had been struggling with a knee injury and would miss the rest of the season.

=== 2024 ===
On 10 May, Cheruiyot competed at the Doha Diamond League, finishing second as part of a Kenyan 1-2-3 alongside Brian Komen and Reynold Cheruiyot, in a time of 3:32.67. At the Oslo Diamond League on 30 May, Cheruiyot finished second, being narrowly pipped on the line by a diving Jakob Ingebrigtsen, in a season's best of 3:29.77. At the Kenyan Olympic Trials, Cheruiyot finished third in the 1500 m to qualify for the Paris Olympics. In July, he once again finished second behind Jakob Ingebrigtsen at the Monaco Diamond League, running a season's best of 3:28.71.

At the 2024 Summer Olympics in Paris, Cheruiyot finished 11th in the 1500 m, having tried to go with the early pace he faded badly over the last lap. He recovered from his disappointment to win over 800 m at the Grand Prix Lombardia in Brescia and finish second over 1500 m at the Diamond League Final in Brussels.

In November, Cheruiyot expressed his desire to retire from the 1500 m after the 2025 World Championships in Tokyo, and transition to long-distance running and marathons.

=== 2025: World Championship 4th ===
Cheruiyot opened his season the Grand Slam Track Miami meet and finished 6th in the 1500 m in 3:35.61. At the Golden Gala, Cheruiyot finished second in 3:29.75 behind Azeddine Habz. A week later at the Oslo Diamond League, he was 4th in the Mile in 3:49.06. At the Kenyan Championships, Cheruiyot placed 2nd behind Reynold Cheruiyot and went on to take 7th in 3:47.71 in the Bowerman Mile at 2025 Prefontaine Classic.

At the 2025 World Athletics Championships, Cheruiyot placed 4th in the 1500 m, narrowly missing out on the podium behind his compatriot Reynold Cheruiyot.

=== 2026: Commonwealth Bronze Medal ===
Despite his previous statement, Cheruiyot continued to race on the track in 2026. He set a new 3000 m personal best of 7:27.48 at the Shanghai Diamond League, finishing 4th, and a new 5000 m personal best at the Xiamen Diamond League with 13:16.41 for 13th place.

Cheruiyot ran 3:30.67 for 3rd at the Stockholm Diamond League, marking his tenth straight year under 3:31 for 1500 m, then won the Dream Mile at the Oslo Diamond League in a photo-finish 3:48.21 over Yared Nuguse for his first Diamond League circuit victory in 5 years.

At the 2026 Commonwealth Games, Cheruiyot placed 3rd in the Mile behind Josh Kerr and Cam Myers.

== Achievements ==
=== International competitions ===
Representing Kenya
Year	Competition	Venue	Position	Event	Notes
2015	IAAF World Relays	Nassau, Bahamas	2nd	Distance medley relay	9:17.20
2015	World Championships	Beijing, China	7th	1500 m	3:36.05
2016	African Championships	Durban, South Africa	2nd	1500 m	3:39.71
2017	World Championships	London, United Kingdom	2nd	1500 m	3:33.99
2018	Commonwealth Games	Gold Coast, Australia	2nd	1500 m	3:35.17
2018	African Championships	Asaba, Nigeria	2nd	1500 m	3:35.93
2019	World Championships	Doha, Qatar	1st	1500 m	3:29.26
2021	Olympic Games	Tokyo, Japan	2nd	1500 m	3:29.01
2022	World Championships	Eugene, United States	6th	1500 m	3:30.69
2022	Commonwealth Games	Birmingham, United Kingdom	2nd	1500 m	3:30.21
2023	World Championships	Budapest, Hungary	23rd (sf)	1500 m	3:37.40
2024	Olympic Games	Paris, France	11th	1500 m	3:31.35
2025	World Championships	Tokyo, Japan	4th	1500 m	3:34.50
2026	Commonwealth Games	Glasgow, United Kingdom	3rd	Mile	3:55.41
2026	World Ultimate Championship	Budapest, Hungary	8th	1500 m	3:31.47

=== Circuit performances ===
Grand Slam Track results
Slam	Race group	Event	Pl.	Time	Prize money
2025 Miami Slam	Short distance	1500 m	6th	3:35.61	US$12,500
2025 Miami Slam	Short distance	800 m	8th	1:47.12	US$12,500

==== Diamond League wins and titles ====
Year	Competition	Venue	Position	Event	Notes
Representing Nike
2016	Meeting de Rabat	Rabat, Morocco	1st	1500m	3:33.61
2016	Memorial Van Damme	Brussels, Belgium	1st	1500m	3:31.34
2017	BAUHAUS-galan	Stockholm, Sweden	1st	1500m	3:30.77
2017	Weltklasse Zürich	Zürich, Switzerland	1st	1500m	3:31.34
2018	Diamond League Shanghai	Shanghai, China	1st	1500m	3:31.48
2018	Prefontaine Classic	Eugene, United States	1st	One Mile	3:49.87
2018	Golden Gala	Rome, Italy	1st	1500m	3:31.22
2018	Meeting de Paris	Paris, France	1st	1500m	3:29.71
2018	Herculis	Monaco, Monaco	1st	1500m	3:28.41
2018	Weltklasse Zürich	Zürich, Switzerland	1st	1500m	3:30.27
2019	BAUHAUS-galan	Stockholm, Sweden	1st	1500m	3:32.47
2019	Prefontaine Classic	Eugene, United States	1st	One Mile	3:50.49
2019	Athletissima	Lausanne, Switzerland	1st	1500m	3:28.77
2019	Herculis	Monaco, Monaco	1st	1500m	3:29.97
2019	Memorial Van Damme	Brussels, Belgium	1st	1500m	3:30.22
2020	Herculis	Monaco, Monaco	1st	1500m	3:28.45
2020	BAUHAUS-galan	Stockholm, Sweden	1st	1500m	3:35.79
2021	Doha Diamond League	Doha, Qatar	1st	1500m	3:30.48
2021	BAUHAUS-galan	Stockholm, Sweden	1st	1500m	3:32.30
2021	Herculis	Monaco, Monaco	1st	1500m	3:28.28
2021	Weltklasse Zürich	Zürich, Switzerland	1st	1500m	3:31.37
2026	Bislett Games	Oslo, Norway	1st	Mile	3:48.21

=== National championships ===
Year	Competition	Venue	Position	Event	Notes
Representing Nike
2014	Kenyan Championships	Nairobi	7th	800 m	1:47.32
2014	Kenyan Junior Championships	Nairobi	3rd	800 m	1:45.92
2015	Kenyan Championships	Nairobi	2nd	1500 m	3:39.25
2015	Kenyan World Championship Trials	Nairobi	5th	1500 m	3:34.86
2016	Kenyan Championships	Nairobi	2nd	1500 m	3:37.04
2016	Kenyan Olympic Trials	Eldoret	4th	1500 m	3:39.30
2017	Kenyan Championships	Nairobi	1st	1500 m	3:41.0
2017	Kenyan World Championship Trials	Nairobi	2nd	1500 m	3:31.05
2018	Kenyan Commonwealth Games Trials	Nairobi	1st	1500 m	3:34.84
2018	Kenyan Championships	Nairobi	1st	1500 m	3:34.82
2019	Kenyan Championships	Nairobi	1st	800 m	1:43.11
2019	Kenyan World Championship Trials	Nairobi	1st	1500 m	3:34.91
2021	Kenyan Olympic Trials	Nairobi	4th	1500m	3:34.62
2022	Kenyan Championships	Nairobi	6th	1500m	3:37.81
2022	Kenyan Commonwealth Games / World Championships Trials	Nairobi	2nd	1500m	3:34.59
2023	Kenyan Championships	Nairobi	3rd	800m	1:45.10
2023	Kenyan World Championship Trials	Nairobi	1st	1500m	3:34.01
2024	Kenyan Championships	Nairobi	3rd	800m	1:45.65
2024	Kenyan Championships	Nairobi	4th	1500m	3:40.23
2024	Kenyan Olympic Trials	Nairobi	3rd	1500m	3:35.90
2025	Kenyan Cross Country Championships	Nairobi	3rd	2 km	6:20
2025	Kenyan Championships	Nairobi	3rd	1500m	3:37.28

== Personal bests and World Rankings ==
=== Personal bests ===
- 800 metres – 1:43.11 (Nairobi 2019)
- 1500 metres – 3:28.28 (Monaco 2021)
- One mile – 3:47.39 (Oslo 2026)
- 2000 metres – 5:03.05 (Nairobi 2020)
- 3000 metres – 7:27.24 (Shaoxing 2026)
- 5000 metres – 13:16.41 (Xiamen 2026}

=== Progression ===
Year	Time	World Rank	Event	Location	Day
2015	3:34.86	#28	Kenyan World Championship Trials	Nairobi, Kenya	August 1
2016	3:31.34	#4	Brussels Diamond League Meeting	Brussels, Belgium	September 9
2017	3:29.10	#2	Monaco Diamond League Meeting	Monaco, Monaco	July 21
2018	3:28.41	#1	Monaco Diamond League Meeting	Monaco, Monaco	July 20
2019	3:28.77	#1	Lausanne Diamond League Meeting	Lausanne, Switzerland	July 5
2020	3:28.45	#1	Monaco Diamond League Meeting	Monaco, Monaco	August 14
2021	3:28.28	#1	Monaco Diamond League Meeting	Monaco, Monaco	July 9
2022	3:30.21	#8	2022 Commonwealth Games	Birmingham, United Kingdom	August 6
2023	3:29.08	#4	Oslo Diamond League Meeting	Oslo, Norway	June 15
2024	3:28.71	#5	Monaco Diamond League Meeting	Monaco, Monaco	July 12
2025	3:29.75	t-#11	Rome Diamond League Meeting	Rome, Italy	June 6
2026	3:30.67	#14	Stockholm Diamond League Meeting	Stockholm, Sweden	June 7

=== World Rankings ===
Track and Field News
Year	Rank
2016	6th
2017	2nd
2018	1st
2019	1st
2020	N/A
2021	2nd
2022	3rd
2023	NR
2024	5th
2025	6th
