= 2022 Doha Diamond League =

- Dates: 13 May 2022 (pole vault held on 14 May)
- Host city: Doha, Qatar
- Venue: Suheim bin Hamad Stadium
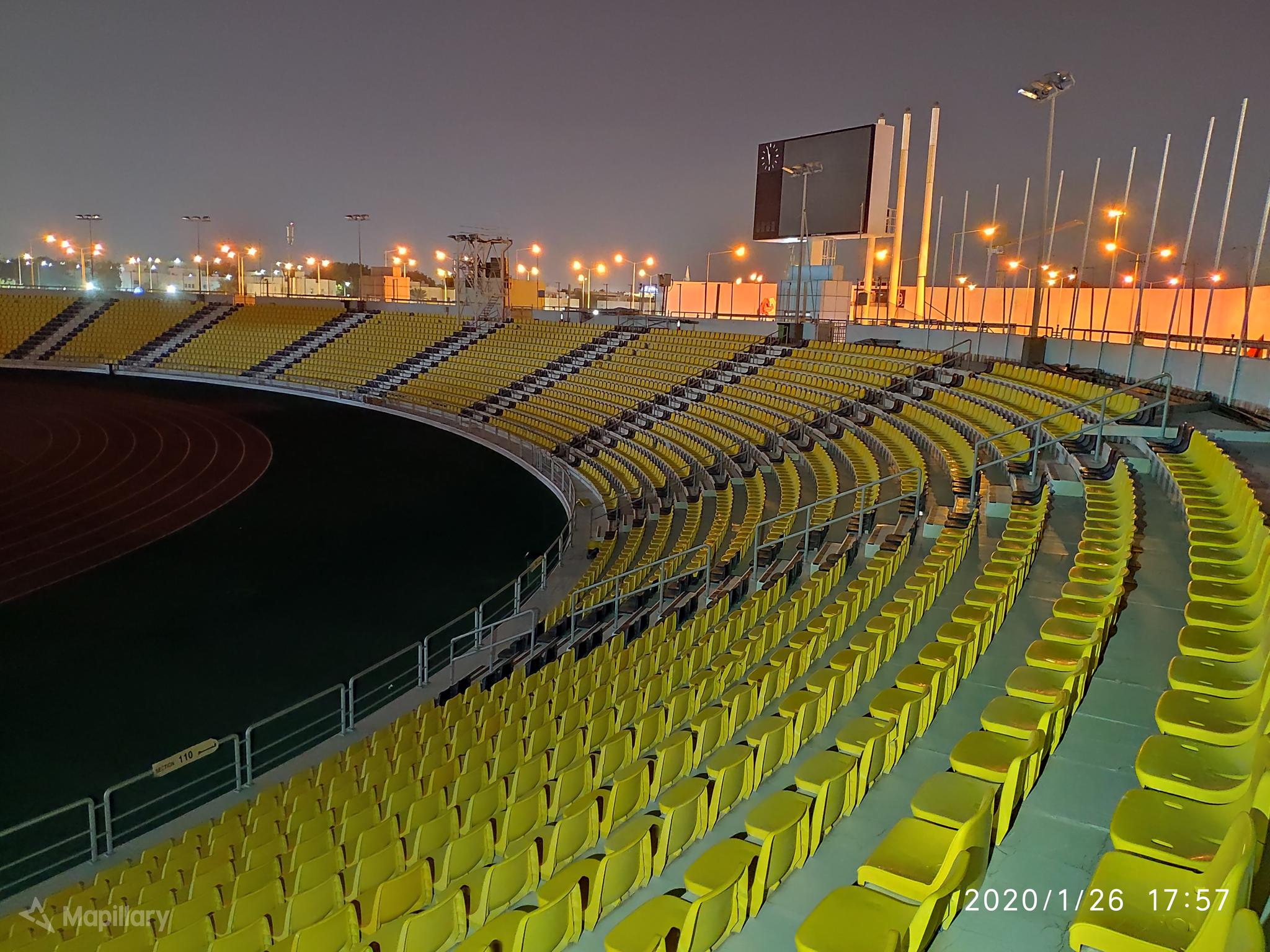
- Level: 2022 Diamond League

The 2022 Doha Diamond League, officially the Ooredoo Doha Meeting, was the 24th edition of the annual outdoor track and field meeting in Doha, Qatar. Held on 13 May 2022 at the Suheim bin Hamad Stadium, it was the opening day for the 2022 Diamond League – the highest level international track and field circuit.

The pole vault competition was held indoors one day after the other events, on 14 May.

The meeting was characterized by strong winds exceeding 20 miles per hour (32 km/h), preventing fast times in most events 400 m and longer. Nonetheless, Francine Niyonsaba upset Faith Kipyegon to win the 3000 m, and Soufiane El Bakkali won the men's 3000 m steeplechase by just 0.01 seconds.

== Results ==
Athletes competing in the Diamond League disciplines earned extra compensation and points which went towards qualifying for the Diamond League finals in Zürich. First place earned 8 points, with each step down in place earning one less point than the previous, until no points are awarded in 9th place or lower.

=== Diamond Discipline ===
Men's 200m (+2.1 m/s)
Place	Athlete	Country	Time	Points
1st place, gold medalist(s)	Noah Lyles	United States	19.72	8
2nd place, silver medalist(s)	Fred Kerley	United States	19.75	7
3rd place, bronze medalist(s)	Jereem Richards	Trinidad and Tobago	20.15	6
4	Andre De Grasse	Canada	20.15	5
5	Aaron Brown	Canada	20.18	4
6	Jerome Blake	Canada	20.25	3
7	Filippo Tortu	Italy	20.41	2
	Femi Ogunode	Qatar	DNF	

Men's 800m
Place	Athlete	Country	Time	Points
1st place, gold medalist(s)	Noah Kibet	Kenya	1:49.08	8
2nd place, silver medalist(s)	Peter Bol	Australia	1:49.35	7
3rd place, bronze medalist(s)	Marco Arop	Canada	1:49.51	6
4	Daniel Rowden	Great Britain	1:49.56	5
5	Ferguson Rotich	Kenya	1:50.48	4
6	Donavan Brazier	United States	1:50.58	3
7	Abdirahman Saeed Hassan	Qatar	1:50.89	2
8	Musaeb Abdulrahman Balla	Qatar	1:50.92	1
	Erik Sowinski	United States	DNF	

Men's 1500m
Place	Athlete	Country	Time	Points
1st place, gold medalist(s)	Abel Kipsang	Kenya	3:35.70	8
2nd place, silver medalist(s)	Timothy Cheruiyot	Kenya	3:36.16	7
3rd place, bronze medalist(s)	Teddese Lemi	Ethiopia	3:37.06	6
4	Yomif Kejelcha	Ethiopia	3:37.85	5
5	Kamar Etyang	Kenya	3:38.74	4
6	Matthew Ramsden	Australia	3:38.83	3
7	Charles Simotwo	Kenya	3:39.18	2
8	Samuel Abate	Ethiopia	3:42.56	1
9	Musab Adam Ali	Qatar	3:47.36	
10	Ignacio Fontes	Spain	3:47.80	
11	Stewart McSweyn	Australia	3:48.67	
	Erik Sowinski	United States	DNF	
	Timothy Sein	Kenya	DNF	

Men's 400mH
Place	Athlete	Country	Time	Points
1st place, gold medalist(s)	Alison dos Santos	Brazil	47.24	8
2nd place, silver medalist(s)	Rai Benjamin	United States	47.49	7
3rd place, bronze medalist(s)	Thomas Barr	Ireland	49.67	6
4	Kyron McMaster	British Virgin Islands	49.93	5
5	Jaheel Hyde	Jamaica	50.23	4
6	Yasmani Copello	Turkey	50.30	3
7	M. P. Jabir	India	50.42	2

Men's 3000mSC
Place	Athlete	Country	Time	Points
1st place, gold medalist(s)	Soufiane El Bakkali	Morocco	8:09.66	8
2nd place, silver medalist(s)	Lamecha Girma	Ethiopia	8:09.67	7
3rd place, bronze medalist(s)	Abraham Kibiwot	Kenya	8:16.40	6
4	Hillary Bor	United States	8:17.82	5
5	Leonard Bett	Kenya	8:21.64	4
6	Benjamin Kigen	Kenya	8:23.65	3
7	Getnet Wale	Ethiopia	8:26.68	2
8	Lawrence Kemboi	Kenya	8:26.70	1
9	Ahmed Abdelwahed	Italy	8:26.89	
10	Daniel Arce	Spain	8:28.69	
11	Topi Raitanen	Finland	8:38.75	
12	Yemane Haileselassie	Eritrea	8:44.35	
13	Ole Hesselbjerg	Denmark	8:46.19	
14	Ben Buckingham	Australia	9:06.21	
	Abderrafia Bouassel	Morocco	DNF	

Men's High Jump
Place	Athlete	Country	Mark	Points
1st place, gold medalist(s)	Woo Sang-hyeok	South Korea	2.33 m	8
2nd place, silver medalist(s)	Mutaz Essa Barshim	Qatar	2.30 m	7
3rd place, bronze medalist(s)	Django Lovett	Canada	2.27 m	6
4	Hamish Kerr	New Zealand	2.24 m	5
5	JuVaughn Harrison	United States	2.20 m	4
6	Shelby McEwen	United States	2.20 m	3
7	Gianmarco Tamberi	Italy	2.20 m	2
	Brandon Starc	Australia	NM	

Men's Pole Vault
Place	Athlete	Country	Mark	Points
1st place, gold medalist(s)	Armand Duplantis	Sweden	6.02 m	8
2nd place, silver medalist(s)	KC Lightfoot	United States	5.71 m	7
3rd place, bronze medalist(s)	Ben Broeders	Belgium	5.71 m	6
4	Chris Nilsen	United States	5.71 m	5
5	Valentin Lavillenie	France	5.71 m	4
6	Renaud Lavillenie	France	5.61 m	3
7	Piotr Lisek	Poland	5.61 m	2
8	Emmanouil Karalis	Greece	5.41 m	1
9	Cole Walsh	United States	5.41 m	
10	Menno Vloon	Netherlands	5.41 m	

Men's Javelin Throw
Place	Athlete	Country	Mark	Points
1st place, gold medalist(s)	Anderson Peters	Grenada	93.07 m	8
2nd place, silver medalist(s)	Jakub Vadlejch	Czech Republic	90.88 m	7
3rd place, bronze medalist(s)	Julian Weber	Germany	86.09 m	6
4	Leandro Ramos	Portugal	84.78 m	5
5	Andrian Mardare	Moldova	84.77 m	4
6	Vítězslav Veselý	Czech Republic	76.92 m	3
7	Thomas Röhler	Germany	72.51 m	2
8	Kim Amb	Sweden	65.70 m	1

Women's 200m (+1.3 m/s)
Place	Athlete	Country	Time	Points
1st place, gold medalist(s)	Gabrielle Thomas	United States	21.98	8
2nd place, silver medalist(s)	Shericka Jackson	Jamaica	22.07	7
3rd place, bronze medalist(s)	Dina Asher-Smith	Great Britain	22.37	6
4	Tamara Clark	United States	22.72	5
5	Anthonique Strachan	Bahamas	22.78	4
6	Beth Dobbin	Great Britain	23.06	3
7	Dezerea Bryant	United States	23.12	2
8	Shannon Ray	United States	23.15	1

Women's 400m
Place	Athlete	Country	Time	Points
1st place, gold medalist(s)	Marileidy Paulino	Dominican Republic	51.20	8
2nd place, silver medalist(s)	Stephenie Ann McPherson	Jamaica	51.69	7
3rd place, bronze medalist(s)	Shaunae Miller-Uibo	Bahamas	51.84	6
4	Sada Williams	Barbados	52.09	5
5	Candice McLeod	Jamaica	52.37	4
6	Natalia Kaczmarek	Poland	52.54	3
7	Kendall Ellis	United States	52.58	2
8	Lynna Irby	United States	52.86	1

Women's 3000m
Place	Athlete	Country	Time	Points
1st place, gold medalist(s)	Francine Niyonsaba	Burundi	8:37.70	8
2nd place, silver medalist(s)	Faith Kipyegon	Kenya	8:38.05	7
3rd place, bronze medalist(s)	Jessica Hull	Australia	8:40.97	6
4	Yasemin Can	Turkey	8:41.38	5
5	Girmawit Gebrzihair	Ethiopia	8:41.88	4
6	Edinah Jebitok	Kenya	8:42.34	3
7	Fantaye Belayneh	Ethiopia	8:43.82	2
8	Fantu Worku	Ethiopia	8:44.10	1
9	Mekides Abebe	Ethiopia	8:45.38	
10	Melknat Wudu	Ethiopia	8:45.76	
11	Nadia Battocletti	Italy	8:50.66	
12	Beatrice Chepkoech	Kenya	8:50.74	
13	Winnie Nanyondo	Uganda	8:52.30	
14	Caroline Chepkoech Kipkirui	Kazakhstan	8:54.69	
15	Bertukan Welde	Ethiopia	8:59.10	
16	Beatrice Chebet	Kenya	9:00.62	

Women's 100mH (+3.8 m/s)
Place	Athlete	Country	Time	Points
1st place, gold medalist(s)	Kendra Harrison	United States	12.43	8
2nd place, silver medalist(s)	Britany Anderson	Jamaica	12.44	7
3rd place, bronze medalist(s)	Tobi Amusan	Nigeria	12.44	6
4	Devynne Charlton	Bahamas	12.61	5
5	Cyréna Samba-Mayela	France	12.72	4
6	Gabbi Cunningham	United States	12.75	3
7	Payton Chadwick	United States	12.86	2
8	Megan Tapper	Jamaica	12.92	1

Women's Triple Jump
Place	Athlete	Country	Mark	Points
1st place, gold medalist(s)	Shanieka Ricketts	Jamaica	14.82 m (+6.5 m/s)	8
2nd place, silver medalist(s)	Maryna Bekh-Romanchuk	Ukraine	14.73 m (+6.3 m/s)	7
3rd place, bronze medalist(s)	Thea LaFond	Dominica	14.46 m (+3.8 m/s)	6
4	Neja Filipič	Slovenia	14.43 m (+3.6 m/s)	5
5	Patrícia Mamona	Portugal	14.40 m (+3.6 m/s)	4
6	Kimberly Williams	Jamaica	14.28 m (+4.9 m/s)	3
7	Naomi Metzger	Great Britain	14.24 m (+4.7 m/s)	2
8	Paola Borovic	Croatia	13.64 m (+4.0 m/s)	1
	Ana José Tima	Dominican Republic	DQ	

Women's Shot Put
Place	Athlete	Country	Mark	Points
1st place, gold medalist(s)	Chase Ealey	United States	19.51 m	8
2nd place, silver medalist(s)	Maggie Ewen	United States	19.32 m	7
3rd place, bronze medalist(s)	Jessica Ramsey	United States	18.99 m	6
4	Fanny Roos	Sweden	18.85 m	5
5	Danniel Thomas-Dodd	Jamaica	18.72 m	4
6	Raven Saunders	United States	18.71 m	3
7	Sara Gambetta	Germany	18.40 m	2
8	Jessica Schilder	Netherlands	18.28 m	1

=== National Events ===
Men's 100m (+5.4 m/s)
Place	Athlete	Country	Time
1st place, gold medalist(s)	Hussein Ali al-Khafaji	Iraq	10.10
2nd place, silver medalist(s)	Mahamat Goubaye Youssouf	Chad	10.12
3rd place, bronze medalist(s)	Kayhan Özer	Turkey	10.21
4	Noureddine Hadid	Lebanon	10.29
5	Youssef Hamed	Qatar	10.32
6	Saeed Othman Alabsi	Qatar	10.34
7	Khalid Wadi Adoum	Qatar	10.66
	Tosin Ogunode	Qatar	DQ

Men's 400m
Place	Athlete	Country	Time
1st place, gold medalist(s)	Ammar Ibrahim	Qatar	46.89
2nd place, silver medalist(s)	Rami Balti	Tunisia	47.74
3rd place, bronze medalist(s)	Hayder Al-Yasiri	Qatar	48.02
4	Yousef Masrahi	Saudi Arabia	48.21
5	Hussein Ibrahim Issaka	Qatar	48.37
6	Abdurrahman Abubakar Mohammad Bukur	Nigeria	49.40
7	Abdelmadjid Mahamat Mahadjir	Qatar	49.48
8	Ahmed Khalifa Ali Aal-Abdusalam	Oman	50.55

Men's 800m
Place	Athlete	Country	Time
1st place, gold medalist(s)	Mohamed Tabakkouyat	Morocco	1:51.78
2nd place, silver medalist(s)	Bader Alsweed	Kuwait	1:51.81
3rd place, bronze medalist(s)	Ilyass el Ouali	Morocco	1:52.29
4	Rabi Mohamoud Mubarak	Qatar	1:52.45
5	Abdullah Al-Yaari	Yemen	1:52.59
6	Saleh Hammad	Qatar	1:54.72
7	Zakaria al Alhlami	Morocco	1:55.07
8	Othmane Dani	Qatar	1:56.56
9	Abdulaziz Khafif	Kuwait	1:57.92
	Abdulrahman Balla Shagag Muawia	Sudan	DNF

Men's 400mH
Place	Athlete	Country	Time
1st place, gold medalist(s)	Ashrat Hussen Osman	Qatar	50.96
2nd place, silver medalist(s)	Ismail Doudai Abakar	Qatar	51.73
3rd place, bronze medalist(s)	İsmail Nezir	Turkey	51.76
4	Mohamed Amine Touati	Tunisia	52.00
5	Rabani Mohammed	Ghana	57.06
6	Mahamat Moussa Abdallah Mahamoud	Chad	57.33

== See also ==
- 2022 Diamond League
- 2022 Weltklasse Zürich (Diamond League final)
