= 2020 Herculis =

- Organisers: World Athletics
- Edition: 33rd
- Dates: 14 August 2020
- Host city: Fontvieille, Monaco
- Venue: Stade Louis II
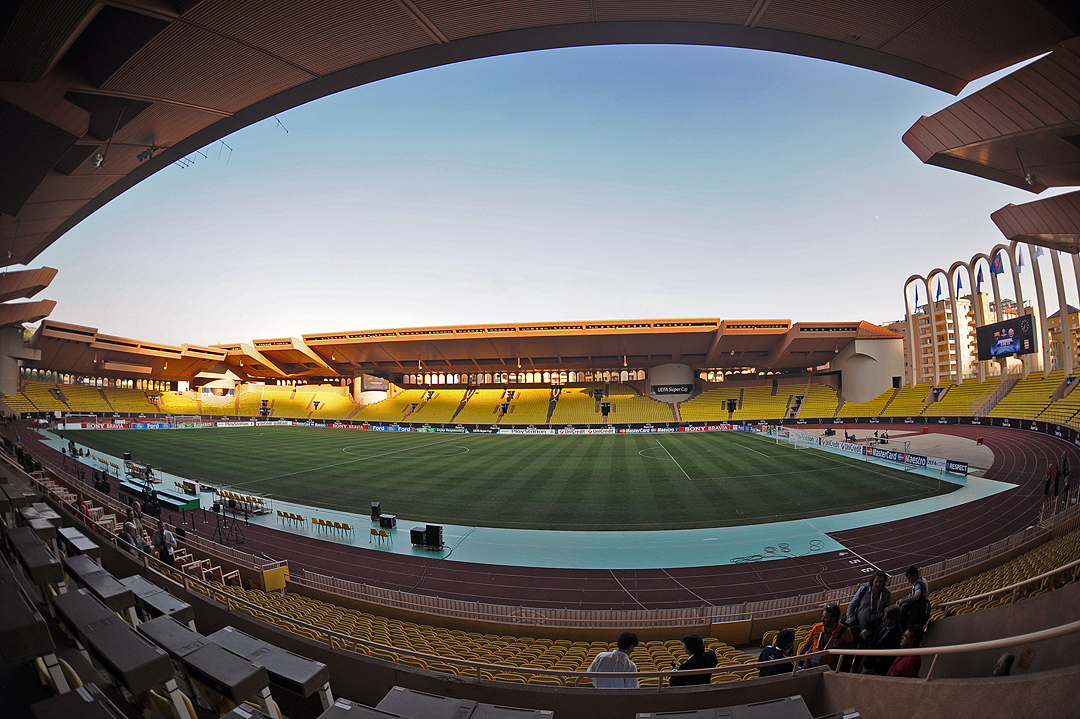
- Events: 14
- Official website: monaco.diamondleague.com

2020 Herculis was the 34th edition of the annual outdoor track and field meeting held on 14 August at the Stade Louis II in Monaco. It was the first leg of the 2020 Diamond League, which had been delayed due to the COVID-19 pandemic.

Uganda's Joshua Cheptegei set a new 5000 metres world record of 12:35.36 minutes, knocking two seconds off the previous record set by Kenenisa Bekele in 2004.

== Results ==
Because of the disrupted season with several cancelled meets, no Diamond League points were awarded for athlete placements.

=== Men ===
200 m (+0.7 m/s)
Place	Athlete	Time
1st place, gold medalist(s)	Noah Lyles (USA)	19.76 WL
2nd place, silver medalist(s)	Josephus Lyles (USA)	20.30
3rd place, bronze medalist(s)	Deniz Almas (GER)	20.64 PB
4	Adam Gemili (GBR)	20.68
5	Ramil Guliyev (TUR)	20.80
6	Mario Burke (BAR)	20.91
7	Marvin René (FRA)	20.97
8	Mouhamadou Fall (FRA)	21.20

800 m
Place	Athlete	Time
1st place, gold medalist(s)	Donavan Brazier (USA)	1:43.15 WL
2nd place, silver medalist(s)	Bryce Hoppel (USA)	1:43.23 PB
3rd place, bronze medalist(s)	Marco Arop (CAN)	1:44.14 PB
4	Benjamin Robert (FRA)	1:44.56 PB
5	Kyle Langford (GBR)	1:44.83 PB
6	Marc Reuther (GER)	1:44.93 PB
7	Peter Bol (AUS)	1:44.96
8	Ferguson Cheruiyot Rotich (KEN)	1:45.48
9	Amel Tuka (BIH)	1:45.97
10	Joseph Deng (NZL)	1:46.20
—	Mame-Ibra Anne (FRA)	DNF (PM)

1500 m
Place	Athlete	Time
1st place, gold medalist(s)	Timothy Cheruiyot (KEN)	3:28.45 WL
2nd place, silver medalist(s)	Jakob Ingebrigtsen (NOR)	3:28.68 AR
3rd place, bronze medalist(s)	Jake Wightman (GBR)	3:29.47 PB
4	Filip Ingebrigtsen (NOR)	3:30.35
5	Yomif Kejelcha (ETH)	3:32.69
6	Jesús Gómez (ESP)	3:33.07 PB
7	Marcin Lewandowski (POL)	3:33.99
8	Charlie Grice (GBR)	3:34.63
9	Pierrik Jocteur-Monrozier (FRA)	3:35.00 PB
10	Kalle Berglund (SWE)	3:35.34
11	Craig Engels (USA)	3:35.42
12	Ryan Gregson (AUS)	3:35.57
—	Vincent Kibet Keter (KEN)	DNF (PM)
—	Timothy Sein (KEN)	DNF (PM)

5000 m
Place	Athlete	Time
1st place, gold medalist(s)	Joshua Cheptegei (UGA)	12:35.36 WR
2nd place, silver medalist(s)	Nicholas Kimeli (KEN)	12:51.78 PB
3rd place, bronze medalist(s)	Jacob Krop (KEN)	13:11.32
4	Mike Foppen (NED)	13:13.06 NR
5	Ouassim Oumaiz (ESP)	13:13.14 PB
6	Stewart McSweyn (AUS)	13:13.22
7	Jimmy Gressier (FRA)	13:15.77 PB
8	Per Svela (NOR)	13:23.97 PB
9	Suldan Hassan (SWE)	13:31.62
10	Julien Wanders (SUI)	13:49.85
—	Yemaneberhan Crippa (ITA)	DNF
—	Roy Hoornweg (NED)	DNF (PM)
—	Henrik Ingebrigtsen (NOR)	DNF
—	Stephen Kissa (UGA)	DNF (PM)
—	Matthew Ramsden (AUS)	DNF (PM)

110 m hurdles (+0.8 m/s)
Place	Athlete	Time
1st place, gold medalist(s)	Orlando Ortega (ESP)	13.11 WL
2nd place, silver medalist(s)	Andrew Pozzi (GBR)	13.14 =PB
3rd place, bronze medalist(s)	Wilhem Belocian (FRA)	13.18 PB
4	Grant Holloway (USA)	13.19
5	Paolo Dal Molin (ITA)	13.61
6	Vladimir Vukicevic (NOR)	13.75
7	Jason Joseph (SUI)	13.84
8	Antonio Alkana (RSA)	13.87

400 m hurdles
Place	Athlete	Time
1st place, gold medalist(s)	Karsten Warholm (NOR)	47.10 WL MR
2nd place, silver medalist(s)	Yasmani Copello (TUR)	49.04
3rd place, bronze medalist(s)	Rasmus Mägi (EST)	49.23
4	Ludvy Vaillant (FRA)	49.35
5	Constantin Preis (GER)	49.49

3000 m steeplechase
Place	Athlete	Time
1st place, gold medalist(s)	Soufiane El Bakkali (MAR)	8:08.04 WL
2nd place, silver medalist(s)	Leonard Kipkemoi Bett (KEN)	8:08.78
3rd place, bronze medalist(s)	Djilali Bedrani (FRA)	8:13.43
4	Fernando Carro (ESP)	8:13.45
5	Matthew Hughes (CAN)	8:16.25
6	Topi Raitanen (FIN)	8:16.57 PB
7	Daniel Arce (ESP)	8:19.40 PB
8	Lamecha Girma (ETH)	8:22.57
9	Ole Hesselbjerg (DEN)	8:24.87 PB
10	Getnet Wale (ETH)	8:35.85
11	Zak Seddon (GBR)	8:38.86
—	Alexis Phelut (FRA)	DNF (PM)

Pole vault
Place	Athlete	Mark
1st place, gold medalist(s)	Mondo Duplantis (SWE)	6.00 m WL
2nd place, silver medalist(s)	Ben Broeders (BEL)	5.70 m
3rd place, bronze medalist(s)	Ernest Obiena (PHI)	5.70 m
4	Claudio Stecchi (ITA)	5.50 m
5	Thiago Braz (BRA)	5.50 m
—	Sam Kendricks (USA)	DNS

=== Women ===
100 m (+0.4 m/s)
Place	Athlete	Time
1st place, gold medalist(s)	Ajla Del Ponte (SUI)	11.16
2nd place, silver medalist(s)	Aleia Hobbs (USA)	11.28
3rd place, bronze medalist(s)	Gina Lückenkemper (GER)	11.31
4	Marie-Josée Ta Lou (CIV)	11.39
5	Maja Mihalinec (SLO)	11.44
6	Anna Bongiorni (ITA)	11.44
7	Rebekka Haase (GER)	11.47
8	Daryll Neita (GBR)	11.50

400 m
Place	Athlete	Time
1st place, gold medalist(s)	Lynna Irby (USA)	50.50 WL
2nd place, silver medalist(s)	Wadeline Jonathas (USA)	51.40
3rd place, bronze medalist(s)	Femke Bol (NED)	51.57
4	Justyna Święty-Ersetic (POL)	52.11
5	Lada Vondrová (CZE)	52.13
6	Corinna Schwab (GER)	52.21
7	Anita Horvat (SLO)	52.45
8	Amandine Brossier (FRA)	52.98

1000 m
Place	Athlete	Time
1st place, gold medalist(s)	Faith Kipyegon (KEN)	2:29.15 AR DLR WL
2nd place, silver medalist(s)	Laura Muir (GBR)	2:30.82 NR
3rd place, bronze medalist(s)	Ciara Mageean (IRL)	2:31.06 NR
4	Jemma Reekie (GBR)	2:31.11 PB
5	Halimah Nakaayi (UGA)	2:32.12 NR
6	Sofia Ennaoui (POL)	2:32.30 NR
7	Selina Büchel (SUI)	2:35.58 PB
8	Winnie Nanyondo (UGA)	2:36.54
9	Raevyn Rogers (USA)	2:37.10
—	Shelayna Oskan-Clarke (GBR)	DNF (PM)

5000 m
Place	Athlete	Time
1st place, gold medalist(s)	Hellen Obiri (KEN)	14:22.12 WL MR
2nd place, silver medalist(s)	Letesenbet Gidey (ETH)	14:26.57
3rd place, bronze medalist(s)	Laura Weightman (GBR)	14:35.44 PB
4	Jessica Hull (AUS)	14:43.80 NR
5	Shannon Rowbury (USA)	14:54.11
6	Beatrice Chepkoech (KEN)	14:55.01
7	Eilish McColgan (GBR)	14:57.37
8	Genevieve Gregson (AUS)	15:38.22
9	Liv Westphal (FRA)	15:39.66
10	Alessia Zarbo (FRA)	16:09.70
—	Winny Chebet (KEN)	DNF (PM)
—	Esther Guerrero (ESP)	DNF (PM)
—	Sifan Hassan (NED)	DNF

High jump
Place	Athlete	Mark
1st place, gold medalist(s)	Yaroslava Mahuchikh (UKR)	1.98 m
2nd place, silver medalist(s)	Yuliya Levchenko (UKR)	1.98 m
3rd place, bronze medalist(s)	Jeanelle Scheper (LCA)	1.88 m
4	Mirela Demireva (BUL)	1.84 m
5	Salome Lang (SUI)	1.84 m
6	Katarina Johnson-Thompson (GBR)	1.84 m
7	Erika Furlani (ITA)	1.84 m

Triple jump
Place	Athlete	Mark
1st place, gold medalist(s)	Yulimar Rojas (VEN)	14.27 m (±0.0 m/s)
2nd place, silver medalist(s)	Gabriela Petrova (BUL)	14.18 m (+0.5 m/s)
3rd place, bronze medalist(s)	Patrícia Mamona (POR)	14.08 m (−0.3 m/s)
4	Dovilė Kilty (LTU)	13.98 m (−0.3 m/s)
5	Neja Filipič (SLO)	13.80 m (−0.1 m/s)
6	Naomi Ogbeta (GBR)	13.56 m (+0.1 m/s)
7	Diana Zagainova (LTU)	13.52 m (−0.1 m/s)
