= 2022 World Athletics U20 Championships – Men's 3000 metres =

Men's 3000 metres at the 2022 World Athletics U20 Championships
- Venue: Estadio Olímpico Pascual Guerrero
- Dates: 3 August (round 1); 5 August (final)
- Competitors: 34 from 23 nations
- Winning time: 7:44.06

Medalists
gold medal	Melkeneh Azize	Ethiopia
silver medal	Felix Korir	Kenya
bronze medal	Edwin Kisalsak	Kenya

The men's 3000 metres at the 2022 World Athletics U20 Championships was held at the Estadio Olímpico Pascual Guerrero in Cali, Colombia on 3 and 5 August 2022.

42 athletes from 28 countries were originally entered to the competition, however, 34 of them competed.

== Records ==
U20 standing records prior to the 2022 World Athletics U20 Championships were as follows:

Record	Athlete & Nationality	Mark	Location	Date
World U20 Record	Yomif Kejelcha (ETH)	7:28.19	Paris, France	27 August 2016
Championship Record	Tadese Worku (ETH)	7:42.09	Nairobi, Kenya	18 August 2021
World U20 Leading	Reynold Cheruiyot (KEN)	7:39.09	Djibouti, Djibouti	25 March 2022

== Results ==
=== Round 1 ===
Round 1 took place on 3 August, with the 34 athletes involved being split into 2 heats of 17 athletes each. The first 6 athletes in each heat ( Q ) and the next 3 fastest ( q ) qualified to the final. The overall results were as follows:

Rank	Heat	Name	Nationality	Time	Note
1	2	Edwin Kisalsak	Kenya	7:55.60	Q
2	2	Habtom Samuel	Eritrea	7:56.70	Q SB
3	2	Diriba Girma	Ethiopia	7:57.16	Q
4	2	Rogers Kibet	Uganda	7:57.18	Q
5	1	Felix Korir	Kenya	7:58.12	Q
6	1	Dan Kibet	Uganda	7:59.71	Q
7	2	Keita Sato	Japan	8:00.17	Q SB
8	1	Melkeneh Azize	Ethiopia	8:00.37	Q
9	2	Joel Ibler Lillesø	Denmark	8:07.34	Q
10	1	Nick Griggs	Ireland	8:08.35	Q
11	2	Hassan Idleh Diraneh	Djibouti	8:11.08	q
12	2	David Šlapák	Czech Republic	8:11.55	q
13	2	Mario Monreal	Spain	8:13.49	q
14	2	Esten Hansen-Møllerud Hauen	Norway	8:15.70	
15	1	Hiroto Yoshioka	Japan	8:15.95	Q
16	1	Noah Konteh	Belgium	8:16.22	Q
17	1	Stefan Nillessen	Netherlands	8:16.34	
18	1	Will Barnicoat	Great Britain	8:17.32	
19	1	Pedro Vázquez	Spain	8:17.99	
20	1	Ian Sánchez	Mexico	8:19.35	
21	1	Yazid Dalla	Algeria	8:19.92	
22	1	Will Anthony	New Zealand	8:21.13	
23	2	Lucas Guerra	United States	8:21.90	
24	1	Patrick Clanton	Australia	8:25.63	
25	1	Loann Brelivet	France	8:25.95	
26	1	Matěj Hřebačka	Czech Republic	8:26.39	
27	2	Mohamed Aataati	Morocco	8:26.66	
28	2	Iker Sánchez	Mexico	8:26.95	
29	1	Christoph Schrick	Germany	8:30.07	
30	2	Callum Morgan	Ireland	8:36.23	
31	2	Thomas Diamond	Australia	8:38.84	
32	1	Moheddine Benchahyd	Morocco	8:43.27	
33	2	Esteban Ortega	Colombia	9:05.92	
	2	Teun Ter Haar	Netherlands	DNF	

=== Final ===
The final was started at 17:04 on 5 August.

Rank	Name	Nationality	Time	Note
1st place, gold medalist(s)	Melkeneh Azize	Ethiopia	7:44.06	
2nd place, silver medalist(s)	Felix Korir	Kenya	7:47.86	PB
3rd place, bronze medalist(s)	Edwin Kisalsak	Kenya	7:49.82	PB
4	Diriba Girma	Ethiopia	7:50.63	
5	Rogers Kibet	Uganda	7:50.95	PB
6	Joel Ibler Lillesø	Denmark	7:56.40	
7	Dan Kibet	Uganda	8:02.08	
8	Habtom Samuel	Eritrea	8:03.98	
9	Nick Griggs	Ireland	8:04.42	
10	Hassan Idleh Diraneh	Djibouti	8:11.38	
11	David Šlapák	Czech Republic	8:18.55	
12	Noah Konteh	Belgium	8:18.61	
13	Mario Monreal	Spain	8:18.71	
	Keita Sato	Japan		DNS
	Hiroto Yoshioka	Japan		DNS
