= 2019 Herculis =

- Dates: 11–12 July 2019
- Host city: Monaco
- Venue: Stade Louis II
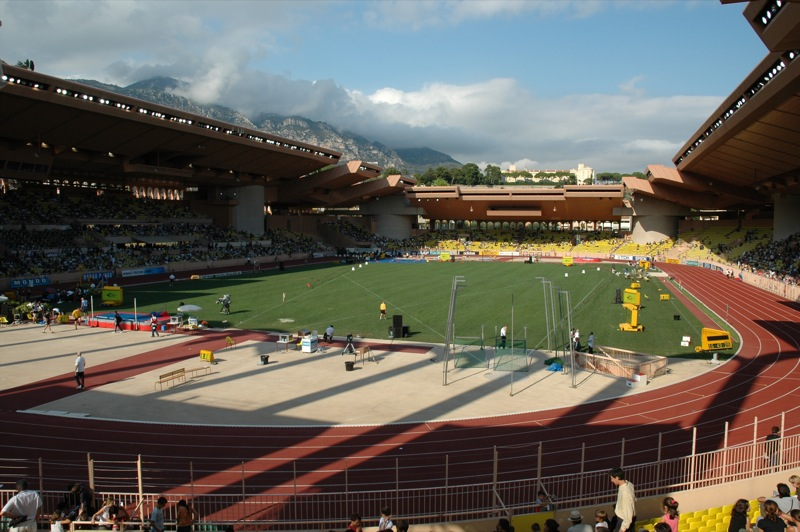
- Level: 2019 IAAF Diamond League
- Events: 15 (13 Diamond League)

The 2019 Herculis was the 33rd edition of the annual outdoor track and field meeting in Monaco. Held from 11–12 July at Stade Louis II, it was the ninth leg of the 2019 IAAF Diamond League – the highest level international track and field circuit. 15 events were contested with 13 of them being point-scoring Diamond League disciplines. Most events were held on 12 July, except for the women's triple jump, which was held on 11 July at Port Hercules.

In recognition of the recently deceased professional athlete Gabe Grunewald, who died a month earlier (11 June) after multiple battles with cancer and attempts to race through the disease, the meet organisers named the women's mile race the "Brave Like Gabe Mile". An elite field including world record holder in the 5 km, Sifan Hassan, and Diamond League leader in the 1500 m, Gudaf Tsegay, were invited. Hassan described the first 800 m as "a bit slow", but was able to run the last 800 m four seconds faster than the first to break a 23-year-old world record in the women's mile with a time 4:12.33. Hassan was recorded completing the first 1500 m in 3:55.30, a world leading time and faster than her Dutch record of 3:55.93. Every competitor in the race set either a personal best or a seasonal best, and national records were set by Gabriela DeBues-Stafford (4:17.87), Rababe Arafi (4:18.42), and Winnie Nanyondo (4:18.65) for Canada, Morocco, and Uganda respectively.

Also in the women's events, Sydney McLaughlin won the 400 m hurdles in a world leading time of 53.32.

On the men's side, Nijel Amos ran the first sub-1:42.00 time since he became the third-fastest competitor in the 800 m ever at the 2012 Olympic final, with a Herculis meeting record and 2019 world-leading time of 1:41.89. Only five people, including Amos himself, had ever run faster than 1:41.89. Piotr Lisek set a second personal best and Polish record in the span of a week with a meeting record and world-leading mark of 6.02 m in the pole vault, forcing European champion and world under-20 record holder Mondo Duplantis into second. Other highlights include Soufiane El Bakkali setting a world lead of 8:04.82 in the 3000 m steeplechase, and a meeting record in the triple jump by Christian Taylor with a leap of 17.82 m.

== Diamond League results ==
Athletes competing in the Diamond League disciplines earned extra compensation and points which went towards qualifying for one of two Diamond League finals (either Zürich or Brussels depending on the discipline). First place earned 8 points, with each step down in place earning one less point than the previous, until no points are awarded in 9th place or lower.

=== Men ===
100 m (+0.3 m/s)
Place	Athlete	Time	Points
1	Justin Gatlin (USA)	9.91	15 (+8)
2	Noah Lyles (USA)	9.92	15 (+7)
3	Mike Rodgers (USA)	10.01	17 (+6)
4	Akani Simbine (RSA)	10.04	11 (+5)
5	Cravon Gillespie (USA)	10.14	9 (+4)
6	Jimmy Vicaut (FRA)	10.17	3 (+3)
7	Arthur Cissé (CIV)	10.25	5 (+2)
8	Divine Oduduru (NGR)	10.26	1 (+1)

400 m
Place	Athlete	Time	Points
1	Steven Gardiner (BAH)	44.51	8 (+8)
2	Abderrahman Samba (QAT)	45.00	7 (+7)
3	Nathan Strother (USA)	45.54	15 (+6)
4	Luka Janežič (SLO)	45.76	9 (+5)
5	Davide Re (ITA)	46.21	4 (+4)
DNS	Jonathan Jones (BAR)	Did not start	5
DNS	Anthony Zambrano (COL)	Did not start	0
DQ	Kahmari Montgomery (USA)	Disqualified (false start)	7

800 m
Place	Athlete	Time	Points
1	Nijel Amos (BOT)	1:41.89 WL MR	31 (+8)
2	Ferguson Cheruiyot Rotich (KEN)	1:42.54 PB	24 (+7)
3	Amel Tuka (BIH)	1:43.62	9 (+6)
4	Michael Saruni (KEN)	1:43.70	5 (+5)
5	Brandon McBride (CAN)	1:43.83	15 (+4)
6	Wesley Vázquez (PUR)	1:44.40 NR PB	5 (+3)
7	Adam Kszczot (POL)	1:44.69	6 (+2)
8	Jake Wightman (GBR)	1:45.08	1 (+1)
9	Pierre-Ambroise Bosse (FRA)	1:45.43	0
10	Jonathan Kitlit (KEN)	1:45.78	6
DNF (PM)	Harun Abda (USA)	Did not finish (pace maker)	0

3000 m steeplechase
Place	Athlete	Time	Points
1	Soufiane El Bakkali (MAR)	8:04.82 WL	16 (+8)
2	Benjamin Kigen (KEN)	8:05.12 PB	14 (+7)
3	Getnet Wale (ETH)	8:05.51 NR PB	14 (+6)
4	Fernando Carro (ESP)	8:05.69 NR PB	5 (+5)
5	Abraham Kibiwott (KEN)	8:05.72 PB	10 (+4)
6	Hillary Bor (USA)	8:09.23	14 (+3)
7	Djilali Bedrani (FRA)	8:09.47 PB	3 (+2)
8	Takele Nigate (ETH)	8:09.50 PB	1 (+1)
9	Nicholas Kiptanui Bett (KEN)	8:11.47	2
10	Albert Chemutai (UGA)	8:12.29 PB	0
11	Leonard Kipkemoi Bett (KEN)	8:15.90	11
12	Matthew Hughes (CAN)	8:17.26	0
13	Lawrene Kemboi Kipsang (KEN)	8:19.82	3
14	Yoann Kowal (FRA)	8:26.16	0
15	Yohanes Chiappinelli (ITA)	8:26.93	0
16	Daniel Arce (ESP)	8:34.48	0
DNF	Mohamed Tindouft (MAR)	Did not finish	3
DNF (PM)	Barnabas Kipyego (KEN)	Did not finish (pace maker)	0

Pole vault
Place	Athlete	Mark	Points
1	Piotr Lisek (POL)	6.02 m WL MR NR PB	41 (+8)
2	Mondo Duplantis (SWE)	5.92 m	26 (+7)
3	Thiago Braz (BRA)	5.92 m	15 (+6)
4	Paweł Wojciechowski (POL)	5.87 m	16 (+5)
5	Sam Kendricks (USA)	5.82 m	42 (+4)
5	Renaud Lavillenie (FRA)	5.82 m	11 (+4)
7	Valentin Lavillenie (FRA)	5.82 m PB	6 (+2)
8	Alioune Sene (FRA)	5.72 m PB	4 (+1)
9	Cole Walsh (USA)	5.72 m	14
10	Seito Yamamoto (JPN)	5.62 m	15
NM	Raphael Holzdeppe (GER)	No mark	4

Triple jump
Place	Athlete	Mark	Points
1	Christian Taylor (USA)	17.82 m (+0.2 m/s) MR	8 (+8)
2	Will Claye (USA)	17.75 m (−0.3 m/s)	7 (+7)
3	Pedro Pablo Pichardo (POR)	17.38 m (+0.1 m/s)	13 (+6)
4	Hugues Fabrice Zango (BUR)	17.33 m (+0.2 m/s) =NR =PB	10 (+5)
5	Nelson Évora (POR)	17.13 m (+0.4 m/s)	4 (+4)
6	Donald Scott (USA)	17.03 m (−0.4 m/s)	9 (+3)
7	Almir dos Santos (BRA)	16.76 m (+0.1 m/s)	2 (+2)
8	Latario Collie-Minns (BAH)	16.15 m (+0.1 m/s)	1 (+1)

Javelin throw
Place	Athlete	Mark	Points
1	Andreas Hofmann (GER)	87.84 m	21 (+8)
2	Magnus Kirt (EST)	87.47 m	14 (+7)
3	Thomas Röhler (GER)	86.04 m	14 (+6)
4	Cheng Chao-tsun (TPE)	82.29 m	18 (+5)
5	Marcin Krukowski (POL)	82.16 m	10 (+4)
6	Jakub Vadlejch (CZE)	81.00 m	10 (+3)
7	Toni Kuusela (FIN)	74.34 m	2 (+2)
8	Kevin Mayer (FRA)	67.52 m	1 (+1)

=== Women ===
200 m (+0.1 m/s)
Place	Athlete	Time	Points
1	Shaunae Miller-Uibo (BAH)	22.09	8 (+8)
2	Elaine Thompson (JAM)	22.44	21 (+7)
3	Dafne Schippers (NED)	22.45	23 (+6)
4	Teahna Daniels (USA)	22.59	5 (+5)
5	Jenna Prandini (USA)	22.66 (.654)	18 (+4)
6	Marie-Josée Ta Lou (CIV)	22.66 (.658)	3 (+3)
7	Gabrielle Thomas (USA)	22.99	7 (+2)

Mile
Place	Athlete	Time	Points
1	Sifan Hassan (NED)	4:12.33 WR	19 (+8)
2	Laura Weightman (GBR)	4:17.60 PB	7 (+7)
3	Gabriela DeBues-Stafford (CAN)	4:17.87 NR PB	11 (+6)
4	Gudaf Tsegay (ETH)	4:18.31	24 (+5)
5	Rababe Arafi (MAR)	4:18.42 NR PB	17 (+4)
6	Axumawit Embaye (ETH)	4:18.58 PB	11 (+3)
7	Winnie Nanyondo (UGA)	4:18.65 NR PB	11 (+2)
8	Ciara Mageean (IRL)	4:19.03 PB	1 (+1)
9	Rachel Schneider (USA)	4:20.91 PB	0
10	Alemaz Samuel (ETH)	4:23.35	1
11	Aisha Praught-Leer (JAM)	4:26.14 PB	0
12	Melissa Courtney (GBR)	4:27.76	0
DNF (PM)	Olha Lyakhova (UKR)	Did not finish (pace maker)	0

100 m hurdles (+0.1 m/s)
Place	Athlete	Time	Points
1	Keni Harrison (USA)	12.43	16 (+8)
2	Danielle Williams (JAM)	12.52	15 (+7)
3	Christina Clemons (USA)	12.62	19 (+6)
4	Janeek Brown (JAM)	12.71	5 (+5)
5	Nia Ali (USA)	12.80	4 (+4)
6	Karolina Kołeczek (POL)	12.93	(3 +3)
7	Sharika Nelvis (USA)	12.98	22 (+2)
DQ	Pedrya Seymour (BAH)	Disqualified (false start)	3

400 m hurdles
Place	Athlete	Time	Points
1	Sydney McLaughlin (USA)	53.32 WL	16 (+8)
2	Ashley Spencer (USA)	54.46	20 (+7)
3	Zuzana Hejnová (CZE)	54.55	19 (+6)
4	Janieve Russell (JAM)	54.70	19 (+5)
5	Rushell Clayton (JAM)	54.82	4 (+4)
6	Léa Sprunger (SUI)	55.60	9 (+3)
7	Kori Carter (USA)	55.63	14 (+2)
8	Anna Ryzhykova (UKR)	55.65	13 (+1)

High jump
Place	Athlete	Mark	Points
1	Mariya Lasitskene (ANA)	2.00 m	40 (+8)
2	Mirela Demireva (BUL)	1.94 m	30 (+7)
3	Nicola McDermott (AUS)	1.94 m	11 (+6)
4	Ana Šimić (CRO)	1.90 m	12 (+5)
4	Levern Spencer (LCA)	1.90 m	12 (+5)
6	Kamila Lićwinko (POL)	1.90 m	7 (+3)
7	Erika Kinsey (SWE)	1.85 m	28 (+2)
7	María Fernanda Murillo (COL)	1.85 m	2 (+2)

Triple jump
Place	Athlete	Mark	Points
1	Yulimar Rojas (VEN)	14.98 m (±0.0 m/s)	15 (+8)
2	Liadagmis Povea (CUB)	14.71 m (+0.6 m/s)	13 (+7)
3	Shanieka Ricketts (JAM)	14.67 m (±0.0 m/s)	17 (+6)
4	Kimberly Williams (JAM)	14.56 m (+1.0 m/s)	14 (+5)
5	Olha Saladukha (UKR)	14.39 m (+0.5 m/s)	9 (+4)
6	Caterine Ibargüen (COL)	14.33 m (+0.6 m/s)	19 (+3)
7	Olga Rypakova (KAZ)	14.31 m (+0.3 m/s)	3 (+2)
8	Paraskevi Papachristou (GRE)	14.31 m (+1.2 m/s)	8 (+1)
9	Keturah Orji (USA)	14.20 m (+0.1 m/s)	7
10	Rouguy Diallo (FRA)	14.20 m (+0.9 m/s)	0
11	Ana Peleteiro (ESP)	14.17 m (+0.5 m/s)	0

== Non-Diamond League results ==
Event	First		Second		Third	
Men's 1500 m	Timothy Cheruiyot (KEN)	3:29.97	Jakob Ingebrigtsen (NOR)	3:30.47	Ronald Musagala (UGA)	3:30.58 NR PB
Women's 800 m	Ajeé Wilson (USA)	1:57.73	Natoya Goule (JAM)	1:57.90	Laura Muir (GBR)	1:58.42 PB

== See also ==
- 2019 Weltklasse Zürich (first half of the Diamond League final)
- 2019 Memorial Van Damme (second half of the Diamond League final)
