= 2022 Herculis =

Diamond League meetings

- Dates: 10 August 2022
- Host city: Fontvieille, Monaco
- Venue: Stade Louis II
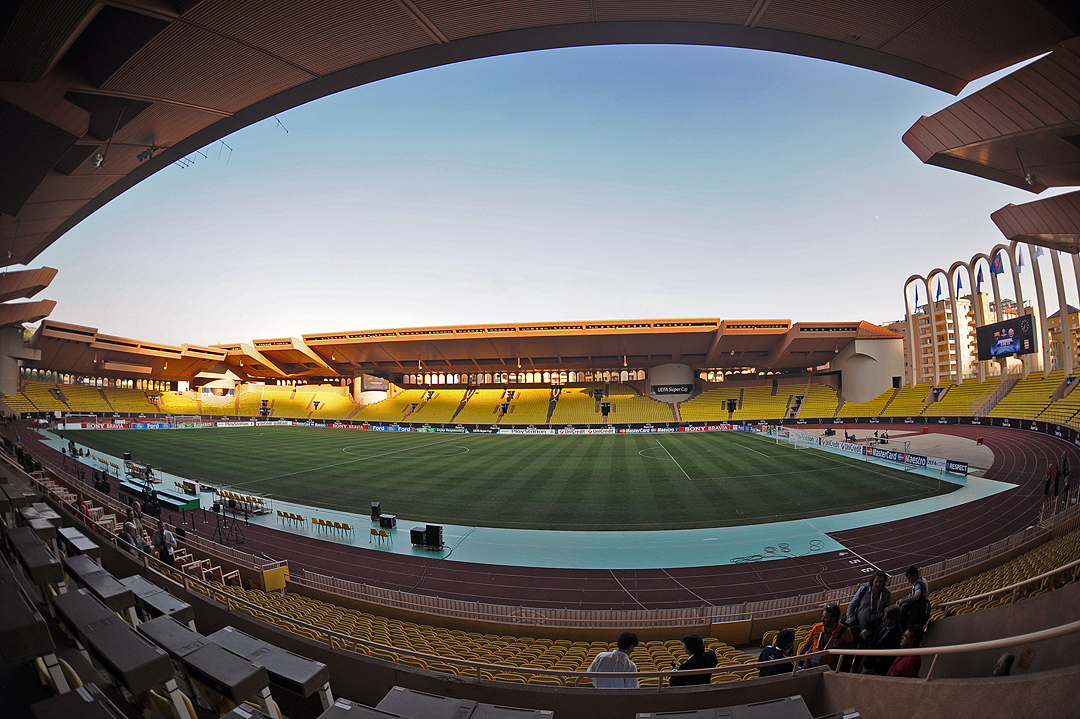
- Level: 2022 Diamond League
- Events: 15 (DL events)

The 2022 Herculis Meeting International d’Athlétisme EBS was the 36th edition of the annual outdoor track and field meeting in Fontvieille, Monaco. Held on 10 August at the Stade Louis II, it was the 10th leg of the 2022 Diamond League.

== Results ==
=== Diamond Discipline ===
Men's 200m (+0.8 m/s)
Place	Athlete	Country	Time	Points
1st place, gold medalist(s)	Noah Lyles	United States	19.46	8
2nd place, silver medalist(s)	Erriyon Knighton	United States	19.84	7
3rd place, bronze medalist(s)	Michael Norman	United States	19.95	6
4	Alexander Ogando	Dominican Republic	20.02	5
5	Aaron Brown	Canada	20.23	4
6	Josephus Lyles	United States	20.26	3
7	Joseph Fahnbulleh	Liberia	20.46	2
8	Méba-Mickaël Zeze	France	20.78	1

Men's 1000m
Place	Athlete	Country	Time	Points
1st place, gold medalist(s)	Jake Wightman	Great Britain	2:13.88	8
2nd place, silver medalist(s)	Marco Arop	Canada	2:14.35	7
3rd place, bronze medalist(s)	Clayton Murphy	United States	2:15.73	6
4	Wyclife Kinyamal	Kenya	2:15.78	5
5	Bryce Hoppel	United States	2:15.99	4
6	Josh Thompson	United States	2:16.38	3
7	Luke McCann	Ireland	2:16.40	2
8	Hobbs Kessler	United States	2:16.46	1
9	Ferguson Rotich	Kenya	2:17.00	
10	Tony van Diepen	Netherlands	2:17.06	
11	Benjamin Robert	France	2:17.11	
12	Emmanuel Korir	Kenya	2:18.19	
	Erik Sowinski	United States	DNF	

Men's 3000m
Place	Athlete	Country	Time	Points
1st place, gold medalist(s)	Thierry Ndikumwenayo	Burundi	7:25.93	8
2nd place, silver medalist(s)	Berihu Aregawi	Ethiopia	7:26.81	7
3rd place, bronze medalist(s)	Grant Fisher	United States	7:28.48	6
4	Nicholas Kimeli	Kenya	7:31.19	5
5	Dominic Lokinyomo Lobalu	South Sudan	7:31.54	4
6	Jacob Krop	Kenya	7:33.30	3
7	Telahun Haile Bekele	Ethiopia	7:38.24	2
8	Woody Kincaid	United States	7:38.81	1
9	Joe Klecker	United States	7:39.58	
10	Hugo Hay	France	7:41.78	
11	Paul Chelimo	United States	7:42.68	
12	Stewart McSweyn	Australia	7:43.31	
13	Cornelius Kemboi	Kenya	7:44.73	
14	Daniel Ebenyo	Kenya	7:44.81	
15	Bethwell Birgen	Kenya	7:56.82	
	Sam Tanner	New Zealand	DNF	
	Mounir Akbache	France	DNF	

Men's 110mH (+0.6 m/s)
Place	Athlete	Country	Time	Points
1st place, gold medalist(s)	Grant Holloway	United States	12.99	8
2nd place, silver medalist(s)	Trey Cunningham	United States	13.03	7
3rd place, bronze medalist(s)	Hansle Parchment	Jamaica	13.08	6
4	Daniel Roberts	United States	13.20	5
5	Sasha Zhoya	France	13.21	4
6	Pascal Martinot-Lagarde	France	13.26	3
7	Damian Czykier	Poland	13.46	2
8	Just Kwaou-Mathey	France	13.78	1

Men's High Jump
Place	Athlete	Country	Mark	Points
1st place, gold medalist(s)	Mutaz Essa Barshim	Qatar	2.30 m	8
2nd place, silver medalist(s)	Woo Sang-hyeok	South Korea	2.30 m	7
3rd place, bronze medalist(s)	Hamish Kerr	New Zealand	2.25 m	6
4	JuVaughn Harrison	United States	2.25 m	5
5	Django Lovett	Canada	2.20 m	4
6	Andriy Protsenko	Ukraine	2.20 m	3
7	Shelby McEwen	United States	2.20 m	2
8	Gianmarco Tamberi	Italy	2.20 m	1
9	Yonathan Kapitolnik	Israel	2.20 m	
	Donald Thomas	Bahamas	NM	

Men's Long Jump
Place	Athlete	Country	Mark	Points
1st place, gold medalist(s)	Maykel Massó	Cuba	8.35 m (−0.4 m/s)	8
2nd place, silver medalist(s)	Miltiadis Tentoglou	Greece	8.31 m (−0.5 m/s)	7
3rd place, bronze medalist(s)	Marquis Dendy	United States	8.31 m (−0.6 m/s)	6
4	Tajay Gayle	Jamaica	8.06 m (+0.4 m/s)	5
5	Thobias Montler	Sweden	7.96 m (+0.1 m/s)	4
6	Murali Sreeshankar	India	7.94 m (−0.8 m/s)	3
7	Mattia Furlani	Italy	7.90 m (−0.3 m/s)	2
8	Erwan Konaté	France	7.87 m (+0.5 m/s)	1
9	Jules Pommery	France	7.83 m (−0.3 m/s)	
10	Steffin McCarter	United States	7.82 m (−0.7 m/s)	

Women's 100m (+0.4 m/s)
Place	Athlete	Country	Time	Points
1st place, gold medalist(s)	Shelly-Ann Fraser-Pryce	Jamaica	10.62	8
2nd place, silver medalist(s)	Shericka Jackson	Jamaica	10.71	7
3rd place, bronze medalist(s)	Marie-Josée Ta Lou	Ivory Coast	10.72	6
4	Aleia Hobbs	United States	10.81	5
5	Twanisha Terry	United States	10.90	4
6	Daryll Neita	Great Britain	10.91	3
7	Tamara Clark	United States	10.96	2

Women's 400m
Place	Athlete	Country	Time	Points
1st place, gold medalist(s)	Shaunae Miller-Uibo	Bahamas	49.28	8
2nd place, silver medalist(s)	Candice McLeod	Jamaica	49.87	7
3rd place, bronze medalist(s)	Sada Williams	Barbados	50.10	6
4	Stephenie Ann McPherson	Jamaica	50.52	5
5	Fiordaliza Cofil	Dominican Republic	50.55	4
6	Junelle Bromfield	Jamaica	50.93	3
7	Kaylin Whitney	United States	51.02	2
8	Sokhna Lacoste	France	53.21	1

Women's 1500m
Place	Athlete	Country	Time	Points
1st place, gold medalist(s)	Faith Kipyegon	Kenya	3:50.37	8
2nd place, silver medalist(s)	Heather MacLean	United States	3:58.89	7
3rd place, bronze medalist(s)	Elise Cranny	United States	3:59.06	6
4	Hirut Meshesha	Ethiopia	4:00.51	5
5	Cory McGee	United States	4:00.70	4
6	Winnie Nanyondo	Uganda	4:00.81	3
7	Georgia Griffith	Australia	4:00.96	2
8	Jessica Hull	Australia	4:01.73	1
9	Sinclaire Johnson	United States	4:02.87	
10	Gaia Sabbatini	Italy	4:04.96	
11	Marta Pérez	Spain	4:05.60	
12	Aurore Fleury	France	4:10.01	
	Axumawit Embaye	Ethiopia	DNF	
	Adelle Tracey	Jamaica	DNF	
	Allie Wilson	United States	DNF	

Women's 400mH
Place	Athlete	Country	Time	Points
1st place, gold medalist(s)	Rushell Clayton	Jamaica	53.33	8
2nd place, silver medalist(s)	Janieve Russell	Jamaica	53.52	7
3rd place, bronze medalist(s)	Gianna Woodruff	Panama	54.13	6
4	Viktoriya Tkachuk	Ukraine	54.27	5
5	Anna Ryzhykova	Ukraine	54.53	4
6	Line Kloster	Norway	54.62	3
7	Ayomide Folorunso	Italy	55.01	2
8	Camille Séri	France	56.36	1

Women's 3000mSC
Place	Athlete	Country	Time	Points
1st place, gold medalist(s)	Werkuha Getachew	Ethiopia	9:06.19	8
2nd place, silver medalist(s)	Zerfe Wondemagegn	Ethiopia	9:06.63	7
3rd place, bronze medalist(s)	Elizabeth Bird	Great Britain	9:07.87	6
4	Emma Coburn	United States	9:07.93	5
5	Jackline Chepkoech	Kenya	9:09.72	4
6	Courtney Wayment	United States	9:09.91	3
7	Marwa Bouzayani	Tunisia	9:22.22	2
8	Amy Cashin	Australia	9:24.19	1
9	Courtney Frerichs	United States	9:32.56	
10	Daisy Jepkemei	Kazakhstan	9:37.83	
11	Adva Cohen	Israel	9:42.71	
12	Irene Sánchez-Escribano	Spain	9:43.36	
13	Tatiane Raquel da Silva	Brazil	9:52.93	
	Virginia Nyambura Nganga	Kenya	DNF	

Women's Pole Vault
Place	Athlete	Country	Mark	Points
1st place, gold medalist(s)	Nina Kennedy	Australia	4.66 m	8
2nd place, silver medalist(s)	Sandi Morris	United States	4.66 m	7
3rd place, bronze medalist(s)	Katerina Stefanidi	Greece	4.66 m	6
4	Roberta Bruni	Italy	4.51 m	5
5	Ninon Chapelle	France	4.36 m	4
6	Lene Retzius	Norway	4.36 m	3
7	Tina Šutej	Slovenia	4.36 m	2
8	Angelica Moser	Switzerland	4.36 m	1
	Margot Chevrier	France	NM	
	Marie-Julie Bonnin	France	NM	

Women's Triple Jump
Place	Athlete	Country	Mark	Points
1st place, gold medalist(s)	Yulimar Rojas	Venezuela	15.01 m (−1.0 m/s)	8
2nd place, silver medalist(s)	Shanieka Ricketts	Jamaica	14.91 m (+0.5 m/s)	7
3rd place, bronze medalist(s)	Tori Franklin	United States	14.86 m (+0.5 m/s)	6
4	Maryna Bekh-Romanchuk	Ukraine	14.59 m (−0.4 m/s)	5
5	Keturah Orji	United States	14.56 m (+0.3 m/s)	4
6	Thea LaFond	Dominica	14.45 m (+0.3 m/s)	3
7	Leyanis Pérez	Cuba	14.37 m (+0.1 m/s)	2
8	Patrícia Mamona	Portugal	14.23 m (−0.4 m/s)	1

Women's Javelin Throw
Place	Athlete	Country	Mark	Points
1st place, gold medalist(s)	Kelsey-Lee Barber	Australia	64.50 m	8
2nd place, silver medalist(s)	Haruka Kitaguchi	Japan	62.37 m	7
3rd place, bronze medalist(s)	Mackenzie Little	Australia	61.76 m	6
4	Kara Winger	United States	60.95 m	5
5	Līna Mūze	Latvia	60.54 m	4
6	Yulenmis Aguilar	Cuba	60.40 m	3
7	Liveta Jasiūnaitė	Lithuania	59.47 m	2
8	Barbora Špotáková	Czech Republic	57.58 m	1
9	Elizabeth Gleadle	Canada	57.08 m	

=== Promotional Events ===
Women's 800m
Place	Athlete	Country	Time
1st place, gold medalist(s)	Natoya Goule	Jamaica	1:56.98
2nd place, silver medalist(s)	Sage Hurta	United States	1:57.85
3rd place, bronze medalist(s)	Olivia Baker	United States	1:58.05
4	Jemma Reekie	Great Britain	1:58.68
5	Abbey Caldwell	Australia	1:59.31
6	Halimah Nakaayi	Uganda	2:00.02
7	Linden Hall	Australia	2:00.45
8	Agnès Raharolahy	France	2:02.25
	Kendra Chambers	United States	DNF
