= 2021 World Athletics U20 Championships – Men's 1500 metres =

Men's 1500 metres at the 2021 World Athletics U20 Championships
- Venue: Kasarani Stadium
- Dates: 19 August (heats); 21 August (final)
- Competitors: 22 from 16 nations
- Winning time: 3:37.24

Medalists
gold medal	Vincent Kibet Keter	Kenya
silver medal	Wegene Addisu	Ethiopia
bronze medal	Melkeneh Azize	Ethiopia

The men's 1500 metres at the 2021 World Athletics U20 Championships will be held at the Kasarani Stadium on 19 and 21 August.

== Records ==
Standing records prior to the 2021 World Athletics U20 Championships
World U20 Record	Ronald Kwemoi (KEN)	3:28.81	Monaco	18 July 2014
Championship Record	Abdalaati Iguider (MAR)	3:35.53	Grosseto, Italy	15 July 2004
World U20 Leading	Kamar Etiang (KEN)	3:33.12	Nairobi, Kenya	19 June 2021

== Results ==
=== Heats ===
Qualification: First 4 of each heat (Q) and the 4 fastest times (q) qualified for the final.

Rank	Heat	Name	Nationality	Time	Note
1	1	Vincent Kibet Keter	Kenya	3:42.35	Q
2	2	Kamar Etiang	Kenya	3:44.75	Q
3	1	Melkeneh Azize	Ethiopia	3:44.81	Q
4	2	Wegene Addisu	Ethiopia	3:44.86	Q
5	1	Abderezak Suleman	Eritrea	3:47.81	Q
6	1	Peter Maru	Uganda	3:48.28	Q
7	2	Pol Oriach	Spain	3:49.32	Q
8	2	Ylies Mihoubi	France	3:50.22	Q
9	2	Santtu Heikkinen	Finland	3:50.55	q
10	1	Hamza Bouchallikh	Morocco	3:51.50	q
11	1	Jean de Dieu Butoyi	Burundi	3:51.70	q
12	2	Dawit Seare	Eritrea	3:53.08	q
13	2	Ismail Loukman	Djibouti	3:53.92	
14	2	Taha Er-Raouy	Morocco	3:55.29	
15	2	Achraf Abbane	Italy	4:00.98	
16	1	Devrim Kazan	Turkey	4:03.61	
17	1	Zola Sokhela	South Africa	4:03.70	
18	2	Keanu Domingo	South Africa	4:06.19	
19	1	Karim Belmahdi	Algeria	4:09.06	
20	1	Justin Ciza	Democratic Republic of the Congo	4:27.96	PB
	1	Nabil Mahdi	Djibouti	DNF	
	2	Israel Tinajero	Mexico	DQ	TR17.3.2

=== Final ===
The final was held on 21 August at 16:31.

Rank	Name	Nationality	Time	Note
1st place, gold medalist(s)	Vincent Kibet Keter	Kenya	3:37.24	
2nd place, silver medalist(s)	Wegene Addisu	Ethiopia	3:37.86	
3rd place, bronze medalist(s)	Melkeneh Azize	Ethiopia	3:40.22	
4	Pol Oriach	Spain	3:40.36	
5	Peter Maru	Uganda	3:41.45	
6	Abderezak Suleman	Eritrea	3:42.53	
7	Hamza Bouchallikh	Morocco	3:46.75	
8	Jean de Dieu Butoyi	Burundi	3:47.42	PB
9	Santtu Heikkinen	Finland	3:49.14	
10	Ylies Mihoubi	France	4:00.63	
	Kamar Etiang	Kenya	DQ	TR17.3.2
	Dawit Seare	Eritrea	DNS	
