= Melkeneh Azize =

Ethiopian athlete (born 2005)

Personal information
- Nationality: Ethiopian
- Born: 1 January 2005 (age 21)

Sport
- Sport: Athletics
- Events: 1500m, 3000m

Achievements and titles
- Personal bests: 800m 1:48.62 (Bydgoszcz, 2021); 1500m: 3:33.74 (Heraglo, 2021); 3000m: 7:39.13 (London, 2024); 5000m: 13:22.59 (Rovereto, 2025); 10,000m: 28:18.34 (Scandiano, 2026); Road; Mile: 4:10.36 (Boston, 2024); 5km: 13:15 (Lille, 2024); 10km: 27:40 (Prievidza, 2026); Half marathon: 59:20 (Valencia, 2026)
Medal record
Men's athletics
Representing Ethiopia
World U20 Championships
| Gold medal – first place | 2022 Cali | 3000m |
| Bronze medal – third place | 2021 Nairobi | 1500m |

Melkeneh Azize (born 1 January 2005) is an Ethiopian long-distance runner. In 2022, he became the World U20 Champion in the 3000 metres.

== Career ==
He won the bronze medal at the 2021 IAAF World Junior Championships in Nairobi, Kenya in the 3000 metres. He won the gold medal at the 2022 IAAF World Junior Championships in Cali, Colombia in the 3000 metres. He was selected for the Ethiopia team for the 2023 World Athletics Championships.
