= Peter Maru =

Ugandan long-distance runner (born 2003)

Personal information
- Nationality: Uganda
- Born: 3 April 2003 (23 years, 89 days old)
- Home town: Kween District, Uganda

Sport
- Sport: Athletics
- Event(s): 5000 metres 10K run
- College team: Arkansas Razorbacks track and field
- Club: Arua

Achievements and titles
- Personal best(s)
- Updated on 1 January 2024

Peter Maru (born 3 April 2003) is a Ugandan long-distance runner. He has represented Uganda at the 2022 World Athletics Championships, and he finished 5th at the 2021 World U20 Championships in the 1500 m.

Maru is currently serving a three-year competition ban set to end in August 2027 for a doping violation.

== Biography ==
Maru was the third child in a poor family of eight children. Originally an association football player, Maru's athletics career started in the 800 metres, and he did not start running the 1500 metres until February 2021. One of the reasons he started running was to fund his schooling – he did not complete his education at Saint John's Chebwik Secondary School because his parents could not afford his bills. Maru trained in Kapchorwa, where he said the lack of sprinters to train with prompted his moving up in distance.

Maru's first international championship was at the 2021 World Athletics U20 Championships – Men's 1500 metres, where he qualified for the finals and finished 5th. He attributed his performance to the lack of a coach and his recent change of disciplines from the 800 m. Following his performance, Maru sought out a college scholarship in the United States but settled for being signed with a management company that placed him in the training camp of Jacob Kiplimo. On New Year's Eve of 2021, Maru was the runner-up in Berihu Aregawi's world record-breaking 5K run in Barcelona.

In 2022, Maru saw further success in the 5000 metres, qualifying to compete in that event at the 2022 World Championships. Maru finished 14th in his qualifying heat, and did not advance to the finals. He blamed "fatigue" for not advancing, claiming he landed in Eugene, Oregon just two days before the race, in the "longest trip of [his] life".

At the 2022 World U20 Championships in the 5000 m, Maru finished 9th in the finals.

In 2024, Maru enrolled as a freshman at the Arkansas Razorbacks track and field team. He ran 13:17.86 to break the school record in his 5000 m debut at the Valentine Invitational in February. He finished 5th in the 5000 m at the 2024 NCAA Indoor Championships. This result came despite sustaining a hamstring injury with 400 m remaining.

In August 2024, Maru was issued with a three-year competition ban for an anti-doping rule violation after testing positive for trimetazidine at an event held in Lille, France in March 2023.

== Statistics ==
=== Personal bests. ===
Event	Mark	Place	Competition	Venue	Date	Ref
5000 metres	13:07.42	8th	Bislett Games	Oslo, Norway	16 June 2022	
10K run	27:30	5th	Lille Half Marathon 10K	Lille, France	19 March 2023	
