= 2023 Herculis =

- Dates: 21 July 2023
- Host city: Monaco
- Venue: Stade Louis II
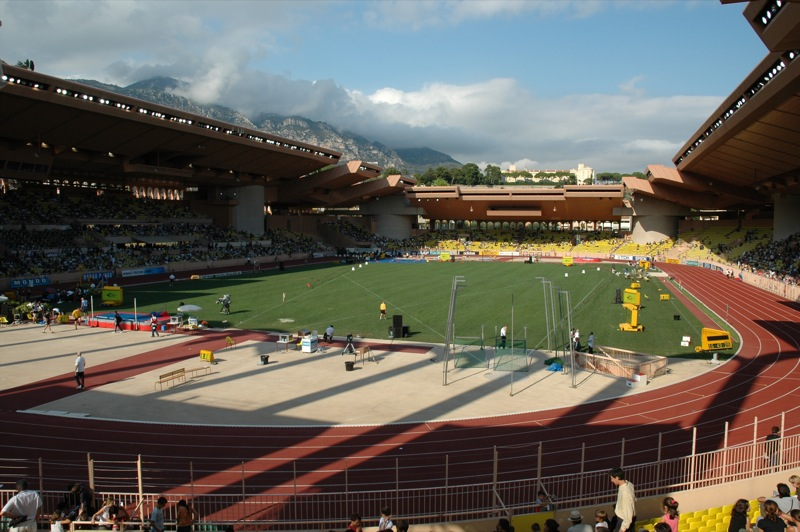
- Level: 2023 Diamond League

The 2023 Herculis was the 37th edition of the annual outdoor track and field meeting in Monaco. Held on 21 July at Stade Louis II, it was the ninth leg of the 2023 Diamond League – the highest level international track and field circuit.

At the meeting, Faith Kipyegon broke the women's mile world record, taking it from 4:12.33 to 4:07.64 and bringing it roughly in line with her earlier 1500 m world record at the 2023 Golden Gala. Behind her, every other competitor in the race set a personal best or national record, including the Irish record, British record, Australian record, American record, French record, and Venezuelan record. The depth of the race made it unique among all other mile races, as continental records were also set for Africa, Oceania, North America, and South America.

== Results ==
Athletes competing in the Diamond League disciplines earned extra compensation and points which went towards qualifying the 2023 Diamond League finals. First place earned 8 points, with each step down in place earning one less point than the previous, until no points are awarded in 9th place or lower.

=== Diamond Discipline ===
Men's 100m (+0.6 m/s)
Place	Athlete	Country	Time	Points
1st place, gold medalist(s)	Ferdinand Omanyala	Kenya	9.92	8
2nd place, silver medalist(s)	Letsile Tebogo	Botswana	9.93	7
3rd place, bronze medalist(s)	Ackeem Blake	Jamaica	10.00	6
4	Yohan Blake	Jamaica	10.01	5
5	Kishane Thompson	Jamaica	10.04	4
6	Joshua Hartmann	Germany	10.15	3
7	Courtney Lindsey	United States	10.16	2
8	Arthur Cissé	Ivory Coast	10.21	1

Men's 800m
Place	Athlete	Country	Time	Points
1st place, gold medalist(s)	Wyclife Kinyamal	Kenya	1:43.22	8
2nd place, silver medalist(s)	Slimane Moula	Algeria	1:43.40	7
3rd place, bronze medalist(s)	Marco Arop	Canada	1:43.51	6
4	Djamel Sedjati	Algeria	1:43.88	5
5	Daniel Rowden	Great Britain	1:43.95	4
6	Bryce Hoppel	United States	1:43.95	3
7	Yanis Meziane	France	1:44.30	2
8	Emmanuel Wanyonyi	Kenya	1:44.35	1
9	Joseph Deng	Australia	1:44.93	
10	Clayton Murphy	United States	1:45.83	
	Ludovic le Meur	France	DNF	

Men's 5000m
Place	Athlete	Country	Time	Points
1st place, gold medalist(s)	Hagos Gebrhiwet	Ethiopia	12:42.18	8
2nd place, silver medalist(s)	Berihu Aregawi	Ethiopia	12:42.58	7
3rd place, bronze medalist(s)	Telahun Haile Bekele	Ethiopia	12:42.70	6
4	Mohamed Katir	Spain	12:45.01	5
5	Jacob Krop	Kenya	12:46.02	4
6	Jacob Kiplimo	Uganda	12:48.78	3
7	Nicholas Kimeli	Kenya	12:55.46	2
8	Thierry Ndikumwenayo	Spain	12:55.47	1
9	Jimmy Gressier	France	12:56.09	
10	Mohammed Ahmed	Canada	13:01.58	
11	Cornelius Kemboi	Kenya	13:01.78	
12	Yann Schrub	France	13:17.95	
13	Cooper Teare	United States	13:19.44	
14	Samuel Tefera	Ethiopia	13:22.22	
15	Kuma Girma	Ethiopia	13:43.60	
	Justin Kipkoech	Kenya	DNF	
	Yemaneberhan Crippa	Italy	DNF	
	Mounir Akbache	France	DNF	

Men's 400mH
Place	Athlete	Country	Time	Points
1st place, gold medalist(s)	Karsten Warholm	Norway	46.51	8
2nd place, silver medalist(s)	Alison dos Santos	Brazil	47.66	7
3rd place, bronze medalist(s)	CJ Allen	United States	47.84	6
4	Ludvy Vaillant	France	47.85	5
5	Wilfried Happio	France	48.25	4
6	Nick Smidt	Netherlands	48.57	3
7	Khallifah Rosser	United States	48.71	2
	Alessandro Sibilio	Italy	DNF	

Men's 3000mSC
Place	Athlete	Country	Time	Points
1st place, gold medalist(s)	Simon Koech	Kenya	8:04.19	8
2nd place, silver medalist(s)	Abraham Kibiwot	Kenya	8:09.54	7
3rd place, bronze medalist(s)	Abrham Sime	Ethiopia	8:10.56	6
4	Samuel Firewu	Ethiopia	8:10.57	5
5	Geordie Beamish	New Zealand	8:13.26	4
6	Anthony Rotich	United States	8:13.74	3
7	Víctor Ruiz	Spain	8:14.41	2
8	Mason Ferlic	United States	8:16.03	1
9	Djilali Bedrani	France	8:16.81	
10	Nicolas-Marie Daru	France	8:18.45	
11	Mohamed Amin Jhinaoui	Tunisia	8:21.63	
12	William Battershill	Great Britain	8:22.64	
13	Amos Serem	Kenya	8:24.02	
14	Conseslus Kipruto	Kenya	8:24.46	
15	Benard Keter	United States	8:29.61	
	Mark Pearce	Great Britain	DNF	
	El Mehdi Aboujanah	Spain	DNF	

Men's Pole Vault
Place	Athlete	Country	Mark	Points
1st place, gold medalist(s)	Chris Nilsen	United States	5.92 m	8
2nd place, silver medalist(s)	EJ Obiena	Philippines	5.82 m	7
3rd place, bronze medalist(s)	Kurtis Marschall	Australia	5.82 m	6
4	Sam Kendricks	United States	5.72 m	5
5	Armand Duplantis	Sweden	5.72 m	4
6	Bo Kanda Lita Baehre	Germany	5.72 m	3
7	Pål Haugen Lillefosse	Norway	5.72 m	2
8	Thibaut Collet	France	5.62 m	1
9	Zach McWhorter	United States	5.62 m	
10	Renaud Lavillenie	France	5.42 m	
11	Ben Broeders	Belgium	5.42 m	
12	Sondre Guttormsen	Norway	5.42 m	

Men's Triple Jump
Place	Athlete	Country	Mark	Points
1st place, gold medalist(s)	Hugues Fabrice Zango	Burkina Faso	17.70 m (−0.4 m/s)	8
2nd place, silver medalist(s)	Jaydon Hibbert	Jamaica	17.66 m (+1.7 m/s)	7
3rd place, bronze medalist(s)	Yasser Triki	Algeria	17.32 m (+0.5 m/s)	6
4	Lázaro Martínez	Cuba	16.81 m (+0.6 m/s)	5
5	Jean-Marc Pontvianne	France	16.71 m (+0.1 m/s)	4
6	Praveen Chithravel	India	16.59 m (+0.6 m/s)	3
7	Will Claye	United States	16.21 m (+0.7 m/s)	2
8	Christian Taylor	United States	16.20 m (+0.2 m/s)	1

Men's Javelin Throw
Place	Athlete	Country	Mark	Points
1st place, gold medalist(s)	Jakub Vadlejch	Czech Republic	85.95 m	8
2nd place, silver medalist(s)	Julian Weber	Germany	84.23 m	7
3rd place, bronze medalist(s)	Keshorn Walcott	Trinidad and Tobago	81.31 m	6
4	Anderson Peters	Grenada	79.70 m	5
5	Curtis Thompson	United States	78.79 m	4
6	Felise Vaha'i Sosaia	France	77.80 m	3
7	Timothy Herman	Belgium	74.34 m	2

Women's 200m (+0.2 m/s)
Place	Athlete	Country	Time	Points
1st place, gold medalist(s)	Shericka Jackson	Jamaica	21.86	8
2nd place, silver medalist(s)	Julien Alfred	Saint Lucia	22.08	7
3rd place, bronze medalist(s)	Dina Asher-Smith	Great Britain	22.23	6
4	Anthonique Strachan	Bahamas	22.40	5
5	Daryll Neita	Great Britain	22.54	4
6	Kayla White	United States	22.54	3
7	Gabrielle Thomas	United States	22.67	2
8	Tamara Clark	United States	22.83	1

Women's 400m
Place	Athlete	Country	Time	Points
1st place, gold medalist(s)	Natalia Kaczmarek	Poland	49.63	8
2nd place, silver medalist(s)	Shamier Little	United States	49.68	7
3rd place, bronze medalist(s)	Lieke Klaver	Netherlands	49.99	6
4	Rhasidat Adeleke	Ireland	49.99	5
5	Sada Williams	Barbados	50.00	4
6	Mary Moraa	Kenya	50.48	3
7	Zenéy van der Walt	South Africa	51.20	2
8	Anna Kiełbasińska	Poland	52.67	1

Women's Mile
Place	Athlete	Country	Time	Points
1st place, gold medalist(s)	Faith Kipyegon	Kenya	4:07.64	8
2nd place, silver medalist(s)	Ciara Mageean	Ireland	4:14.58	7
3rd place, bronze medalist(s)	Freweyni Hailu	Ethiopia	4:14.79	6
4	Laura Muir	Great Britain	4:15.24	5
5	Jessica Hull	Australia	4:15.34	4
6	Nikki Hiltz	United States	4:16.35	3
7	Melissa Courtney-Bryant	Great Britain	4:16.38	2
8	Elise Cranny	United States	4:16.47	1
9	Abbey Caldwell	Australia	4:20.51	
10	Esther Guerrero	Spain	4:22.28	
11	Bérénice Cleyet-Merle	France	4:26.06	
12	Agathe Guillemot	France	4:26.92	
13	Joselyn Brea	Venezuela	4:27.41	
	Winnie Nanyondo	Uganda	DNF	
	Kristie Schoffield	United States	DNF	

Women's 100mH (+0.6 m/s)
Place	Athlete	Country	Time	Points
1st place, gold medalist(s)	Nia Ali	United States	12.30	8
2nd place, silver medalist(s)	Kendra Harrison	United States	12.31	7
3rd place, bronze medalist(s)	Alaysha Johnson	United States	12.39	6
4	Tia Jones	United States	12.39	5
5	Pia Skrzyszowska	Poland	12.68	4
6	Laëticia Bapté	France	12.73	3
7	Sarah Lavin	Ireland	12.74	2
8	Elena Carraro	Italy	13.28	1

Women's High Jump
Place	Athlete	Country	Mark	Points
1st place, gold medalist(s)	Nicola Olyslagers	Australia	1.99 m	8
2nd place, silver medalist(s)	Iryna Herashchenko	Ukraine	1.96 m	7
3rd place, bronze medalist(s)	Yaroslava Mahuchikh	Ukraine	1.96 m	6
4	Eleanor Patterson	Australia	1.96 m	5
5	Angelina Topić	Serbia	1.96 m	4
6	Yuliya Levchenko	Ukraine	1.93 m	3
7	Morgan Lake	Great Britain	1.93 m	2
8	Lia Apostolovski	Slovenia	1.90 m	1
9	Nawal Meniker	France	1.85 m	

Women's Long Jump
Place	Athlete	Country	Mark	Points
1st place, gold medalist(s)	Larissa Iapichino	Italy	6.95 m (+0.3 m/s)	8
2nd place, silver medalist(s)	Tara Davis-Woodhall	United States	6.88 m (+0.2 m/s)	7
3rd place, bronze medalist(s)	Ivana Španović	Serbia	6.86 m (±0.0 m/s)	6
4	Hilary Kpatcha	France	6.77 m (−1.1 m/s)	5
5	Fátima Diame	Spain	6.74 m (−0.6 m/s)	4
6	Brooke Buschkuehl	Australia	6.73 m (−0.4 m/s)	3
7	Ackelia Smith	Jamaica	6.70 m (−0.6 m/s)	2
8	Ese Brume	Nigeria	6.67 m (±0.0 m/s)	1
9	Quanesha Burks	United States	6.66 m (−0.6 m/s)	
10	Yulimar Rojas	Venezuela	6.61 m (−0.6 m/s)	
11	Jazmin Sawyers	Great Britain	6.59 m (+0.5 m/s)	

=== National events ===
Men's 800m
Place	Athlete	Country	Time
1st place, gold medalist(s)	Niels Laros	Netherlands	1:44.78
2nd place, silver medalist(s)	Ermias Girma	Ethiopia	1:44.86
3rd place, bronze medalist(s)	Ryan Clarke	Netherlands	1:45.52
4	Álvaro de Arriba	Spain	1:45.98
5	Filip Šnejdr	Czech Republic	1:46.12
6	Youssef Benzamia	France	1:46.44
7	Bram Buigel	Netherlands	1:47.04
8	Kevin Viezee	Netherlands	1:47.90
	Boitumelo Masilo	Botswana	DNF

== See also ==
- 2023 Diamond League
