= Kenyan Athletics Championships =

National athletics competition

- Sport: Track and field
- Country: Kenya

The Kenyan Athletics Championships is an annual track and field meeting which serves as Kenya's national championships for the sport. Athletics Kenya, the country's governing body for athletics organises the event.

The championships is usually held over a three-day period and the location varies, though the capital Nairobi is a frequent choice as it has both Nyayo National Stadium and the Moi International Sports Centre. The national championships may also serve as the trials for selection to the national team for competitions such as the IAAF World Championships in Athletics, Olympic Games, African Championships in Athletics and the Africa Games.

On some occasions the trial events are held separately from the main national championships. As a result of this, the national championships can be less of a focus for Kenyan athletes and lesser performances are produced, with slow tactical races common in the long-distance track events. Athletics Kenya mitigates this by offering cash bonuses for national champions.

The championships was well established by the 1980s, hosting a full range of Olympic-level individual track events for men. By 1981, the women's programme featured track races from 100 metres to 3000 metres, two hurdles events, high jump, long jump, three throws (shot put, discus, javelin), heptathlon and a 20,000 metres track walk. A 10,000 metres was introduced in 1987, a triple jump following in 1991, then the steeplechase and hammer throw came in 1998. The addition of the women's pole vault in 1999 marked parity of events between the sexes at the Kenyan Championships.

== Editions ==
- 2015 Athletics Kenya World Championship Trials
- 2016 Athletics Kenya Olympic Trials
- 2024 Athletics Kenya Olympic Trials

== Championships records ==
=== Men ===
Event	Record	Athlete/Team	Date	Place	Ref.
100 m	9.85 A (+0.8 m/s)	Ferdinand Omanyala	8 July 2023	Nairobi	
10,000 m	27:01.06 A	Geoffrey Kamworor	18 June 2021	Nairobi	

=== Women ===
Event	Record	Athlete/Team	Date	Place	Ref.
100 m	11.35 A (+0.3 m/s) NR	Maximilla Imali	28 April 2022	Kasarani	
200 m	23.37 A (+0.4 m/s) NR	Maximilla Imali	27 April 2022	Kasarani	
400 m	50.38 (Note: by World Athletics Profile, 50.39 by other sources) A NR	Mary Moraa	7 July 2023	Nairobi	
1500 m	3:59.77 A	Nelly Chepchirchir	8 July 2023	Nairobi	
10,000 m	30:53.60 A	Hellen Obiri	18 June 2021	Nairobi	
100 m hurdles	13.99 A (+0.7 m/s) NR	Priscilla Tabuda	27 April 2022	Kasarani	
High jump	1.75 m A	Zeddy Chesire	22 June 2023	Nairobi	
Hammer throw	59.72 m A NR	Linda Oseso	14 June 2012	Nairobi	
