= Herculis =

Annual athletics meeting in Monaco

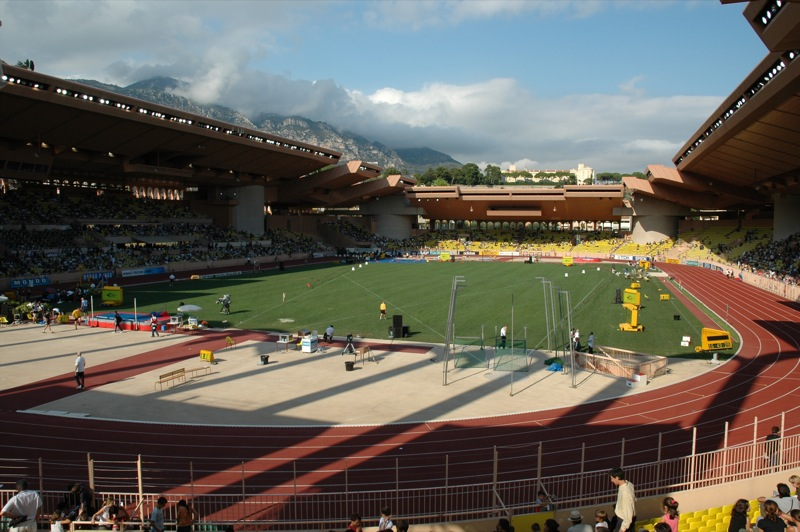
- Herculis in 2005
- Date: July – August
- Location: Stade Louis II, Monaco
- Event type: Track and field
- World Athletics Cat.: GW
- Established: 19 September 1987; 39 years ago
- Website: Diamond League – Monaco
- 2026 Herculis

Logo

The Herculis is an annual track and field meet at Stade Louis II in Fontvieille, Monaco. Previously one of the five IAAF Super Grand Prix events. Herculis is now part of the Diamond League.

== Editions ==
Herculis editions
| Ed. | Meeting | Series | Date | Ref. |
|---|---|---|---|---|
| 1st | 1987 Herculis | | 19 Sep 1987 | |
| 2nd | 1988 Herculis | | 2 Aug 1988 | |
| 3rd | 1989 IAAF Grand Prix Final | 1989 IAAF Grand Prix | 1 Sep 1989 | |
| 4th | 1990 Herculis | 1990 IAAF Grand Prix | 12 Aug 1990 | |
| 5th | 1991 Herculis | 1991 IAAF Grand Prix | 3 Aug 1991 | |
| 6th | 1992 Herculis | 1992 IAAF Grand Prix | 11 Aug 1992 | |
| 7th | 1993 Herculis | 1993 IAAF Grand Prix | 7 Aug 1993 | |
| 8th | 1994 Herculis | 1994 IAAF Grand Prix | 2 Aug 1994 | |
| 9th | 1995 IAAF Grand Prix Final | 1995 IAAF Grand Prix | 9 Sep 1995 | |
| 10th | 1996 Herculis | 1996 IAAF Grand Prix | 10 Aug 1996 | |
| 11th | 1997 Herculis | 1997 IAAF Grand Prix | 16 Aug 1997 | |
| 12th | 1998 Herculis | 1998 IAAF Golden League | 8 Aug 1998 | |
| 13th | 1999 Herculis | 1999 IAAF Golden League | 4 Aug 1999 | |
| 14th | 2000 Herculis | 2000 IAAF Golden League | 18 Aug 2000 | |
| 15th | 2001 Herculis | 2001 IAAF Golden League | 20 Jul 2001 | |
| 16th | 2002 Herculis | 2002 IAAF Golden League | 19 Jul 2002 | |
| 17th | 2003 IAAF World Athletics Final | 2003 IAAF Super Grand Prix | 13–14 Sep 2003 | |
| 18th | 2004 IAAF World Athletics Final | 2004 IAAF Super Grand Prix | 18–19 Sep 2004 | |
| 19th | 2005 IAAF World Athletics Final | 2005 IAAF Super Grand Prix | 9–10 Sep 2005 | |
| 20th | 2006 Herculis | 2006 IAAF Super Grand Prix | 20 Aug 2006 | |
| 21st | 2007 Herculis | 2007 IAAF Super Grand Prix | 25 Jul 2007 | |
| 22nd | 2008 Herculis | 2008 IAAF Super Grand Prix | 29 Jul 2008 | |
| 23rd | 2009 Herculis | 2009 IAAF Super Grand Prix | 28 Jul 2009 | |
| 24th | 2010 Herculis | 2010 Diamond League | 22 Jul 2010 | |
| 25th | 2011 Herculis | 2011 Diamond League | 22 Jul 2011 | |
| 26th | 2012 Herculis | 2012 Diamond League | 20 Jul 2012 | |
| 27th | 2013 Herculis | 2013 Diamond League | 19 Jul 2013 | |
| 28th | 2014 Herculis | 2014 Diamond League | 18 Jul 2014 | |
| 29th | 2015 Herculis | 2015 Diamond League | 17 Jul 2015 | |
| 30th | 2016 Herculis | 2016 Diamond League | 15 Jul 2016 | |
| 31st | 2017 Herculis | 2017 Diamond League | 21 Jul 2017 | |
| 32nd | 2018 Herculis | 2018 Diamond League | 20 Jul 2018 | |
| 33rd | 2019 Herculis | 2019 Diamond League | 11–12 Jul 2019 | |
| 34th | 2020 Herculis | 2020 Diamond League | 14 Aug 2020 | |
| 35th | 2021 Herculis | 2021 Diamond League | 9 Jul 2021 | |
| 36th | 2022 Herculis | 2022 Diamond League | 10 Aug 2022 | |
| 37th | 2023 Herculis | 2023 Diamond League | 21 Jul 2023 | |
| 38th | 2024 Herculis | 2024 Diamond League | 12 Jul 2024 | |
| 39th | 2025 Herculis | 2025 Diamond League | 11 Jul 2025 | |
| 39th | 2026 Herculis | 2026 Diamond League | 10 Jul 2026 | |

== World records ==
Over the course of its history, seven world records have been set at Herculis.

World records set at Herculis
| Year | Event | Record | Athlete | Nationality |
|---|---|---|---|---|
| 2008 | Pole vault | 5.04 m | Yelena Isinbayeva | Russia |
| 2015 | 1500 m | 3:50.07 | Genzebe Dibaba | Ethiopia |
| 2018 | 3000m steeplechase | 8:44.32 | Beatrice Chepkoech | Kenya |
| 2019 | Mile | 4:12.33 | Sifan Hassan | Netherlands |
| 2020 | 5000 m | 12:35.36 | Joshua Cheptegei | Uganda |
| 2023 | Mile | 4:07.64 | Faith Kipyegon | Kenya |
| 2024 | 2000 m | 5:19.70 | Jessica Hull | Australia |
| 2026 | 1000 m | 2:11.83 | Emmanuel Wanyonyi | Kenya |

== Meeting records ==
=== Men ===
Men's meeting records of Herculis
| Event | Record | Athlete | Nationality | Date | Meet | Ref. |
|---|---|---|---|---|---|---|
| 100 m | 9.78 (−0.3 m/s) | Justin Gatlin | United States | 17 July 2015 | 2015 | |
| 200 m | 19.46 (+0.8 m/s) | Noah Lyles | United States | 10 August 2022 | 2022 | |
| 400 m | 43.44 DLR | Collen Kebinatshipi | Botswana | 10 July 2026 | 2026 | |
| 800 m | 1:41.44 | Emmanuel Wanyonyi | Kenya | 11 July 2025 | 2025 | |
| 1000 m | 2:11.83 WR | Emmanuel Wanyonyi | Kenya | 10 July 2026 | 2026 | |
| 1500 m | 3:26.69 DLR | Asbel Kiprop | Kenya | 17 July 2015 | 2015 | |
| Mile | 3:56.75 | John Ngugi | Kenya | 12 August 1990 | 1990 | |
| 2000 m | 5:00.97 | Mohamed Choumassi | Morocco | 2 August 1994 | 1994 | |
| 3000 m | 7:25.02 | Ali Saidi-Sief | Algeria | 18 August 2000 | 2000 | |
| 5000 m | 12:35.36 WR | Joshua Cheptegei | Uganda | 14 August 2020 | 2020 | |
| 110 m hurdles | 12.93 (±0.0 m/s) | Aries Merritt | United States | 20 July 2012 | 2012 | |
| 400 m hurdles | 46.51 | Karsten Warholm | Norway | 21 July 2023 | 2023 | |
| 3000 m steeplechase | 7:53.64 | Brimin Kipruto | Kenya | 22 July 2011 | 2011 | |
| High jump | 2.40 m | Bohdan Bondarenko | Ukraine | 18 July 2014 | 2014 | |
| High jump | 2.40 m X | Danil Lysenko | ANA | 20 July 2018 | 2018 | |
| Pole vault | 6.07 m | Armand Duplantis | Sweden | 10 July 2026 | 2026 | |
| Long jump | 8.61 m (±0.0 m/s) | Miltiadis Tentoglou | Greece | 10 July 2026 | 2026 | |
| Triple jump | 17.82 m (+0.2 m/s) | Christian Taylor | United States | 12 July 2019 | 2019 | |
| Shot put | 22.56 m | Joe Kovacs | United States | 17 July 2015 | 2015 | |
| Discus throw | 69.08 m | Lars Riedel | Germany | 25 July 1995 | 1995 | |
| Javelin throw | 90.20 m | Raymond Hecht | Germany | 10 August 1996 | 1996 | |
| 4 × 100 m relay | 37.58 | USA "Red": Charles Silmon; Mike Rodgers; Mookie Salaam; Justin Gatlin | United States | 19 July 2013 | 2013 | |

=== Women ===
Women's meeting records of Herculis
| Event | Record | Athlete | Nationality | Date | Meet | Ref. |
|---|---|---|---|---|---|---|
| 100 m | 10.62 (+0.4 m/s) | Shelly-Ann Fraser-Pryce | Jamaica | 10 August 2022 | 2022 | |
| 200 m | 21.51 (+0.9 m/s) | Julien Alfred | St. Lucia | 10 July 2026 | 2026 | |
| 400 m | 48.67 | Marileidy Paulino | Dominican Republic | 10 July 2026 | 2026 | |
| 800 m | 1:54.60 | Caster Semenya | South Africa | 20 July 2018 | 2018 | |
| 1000 m | 2:29.15 DLR | Faith Kipyegon | Kenya | 14 August 2020 | 2020 | |
| 1500 m | 3:50.07 | Genzebe Dibaba | Ethiopia | 17 July 2015 | 2015 | |
| Mile | 4:07.64 WR | Faith Kipyegon | Kenya | 21 July 2023 | 2023 | |
| 2000 m | 5:19.70 WR | Jessica Hull | Australia | 12 July 2024 | 2024 | |
| 3000 m | 8:08.95 | Agnes Ngetich | Kenya | 10 July 2026 | 2026 | |
| 5000 m | 14:22.12 | Hellen Obiri | Kenya | 14 August 2020 | 2020 | |
| 100 m hurdles | 12.20 (−0.4 m/s) | Masai Russell | United States | 10 July 2026 | 2026 | |
| 400 m hurdles | 51.95 | Femke Bol | Netherlands | 11 July 2025 | 2025 | |
| 3000 m steeplechase | 8:44.32 WR | Beatrice Chepkoech | Kenya | 20 July 2018 | 2018 | |
| High jump | 2.05 m | Mariya Lasitskene | Russia | 21 July 2017 | 2017 | |
| Pole vault | 5.04 m | Yelena Isinbayeva | Russia | 29 July 2008 | 2008 | |
| Long jump | 7.33 m (−0.3 m/s) | Heike Drechsler | Germany | 11 August 1992 | 1992 | |
| Triple jump | 15.31 m (±0.0 m/s) | Caterine Ibargüen | Colombia | 18 July 2014 | 2014 | |
| Shot put | 20.60 m | Natalya Lisovskaya | Soviet Union | 3 August 1991 | 1991 | |
| Discus throw | 69.30 m | Larisa Korotkevich | Russia | 11 August 1992 | 1992 | |
| Javelin throw | 69.66 m (old design) | Petra Felke-Meier | East Germany | 12 August 1990 | 1990 | |
| Javelin throw | 69.45 m (current design) | Barbora Špotáková | Czech Republic | 22 July 2011 | 2011 | |
| 4 × 100 m relay | 41.75 | USA "Red": English Gardner; Octavious Freeman; Allyson Felix; Carmelita Jeter | United States | 19 July 2013 | 2013 | |
