= Festus Lagat =

Kenyan middle-distance runner

Personal information
- Nationality: Kenyan
- Born: 10 October 1996 (age 30)

Sport
- Sport: Athletics
- Event: Middle-distance running

Achievements and titles
- Personal bests: Outdoor; 800 m: 1:44.10 (Fairfax, 2024); 1000 m: 2:12.96 (Trier 2025); 1500 m: 3:29.03 (Paris, 2025); Mile: 3:48.93 (Eugene, 2025); Indoor; 800 m: 1:47.09 (New York, 2023); 1500 m: 3:37.32 (Boston, 2025); Mile: 3:48.93 (Eugene, 2025)

Festus Lagat (born 10 October 1996) is a Kenyan middle-distance runner.

== Early life ==
From Eldoret, Kenya, he is the eldest of three boys. He moved to the United States on a scholarship to study and run competition, starting at Gillette College before later transferring to Iowa State University.

== Career ==
Running for Iowa State in April 2021, he was a member of the 4x800 metres relay team which set a new meeting record time at the Drake Relays.

After leaving College, he became an Under Armour/District TC athlete based in the Washington, D.C. area. In 2022, he had a fourth-place finish in the 800 metres at the Kenyan World Championship Trials in Kasarani. He later became a member of UA Mission Run Dark Sky and became based in Flagstaff, Arizona.

In March 2025, he ran 3:52.64 for the indoor mile in Boston, Massachusetts, clocking an indoor personal best of 3:37.52 for the 1500 metres. He was selected for the 2025 World Athletics Indoor Championships in Nanjing in March 2025, Kenya's sole representative in the men's 1500 metres race. In May 2025, he ran a personal best 3:32.06 to finish third in the 1500 metres at the 2025 Meeting International Mohammed VI d'Athlétisme de Rabat, part of the 2025 Diamond League. He competed over 1500 metres at the 2025 Meeting de Paris, running a personal best time of 3:29.03. He ran a personal best of 3:48.93 at the 2025 Prefontaine Classic on 5 July in the Bowerman Mile.
