= Kamar Etyang =

Kenyan athlete (born 2002)

Personal information
- Nationality: Kenyan
- Born: 14 October 2002 (age 24)

Sport
- Sport: Track and Field
- Event: 1500m

Kamar Etyang (born 14 October 2002) is a Kenyan athlete specialising in middle distance races.

In February, 2021 he was selected in the Kenya team for the U20 8 km race at the African Cross Country Championships in Togo, unfortunately they were postponed due to concerns surrounding COVID-19.

On April 24, 2021, Etyang finished second at the Mandela National Stadium, Kampala in a time of 3:36.80 in the 1500m as he finished behind Ronald Musagala but in front of world 10000m champion and 5000m and 10000m world record holder Joshua Cheptegei. This was the first time Cheptegei had lost a local track race since 2013.

Etyang came second at the 1500m on the 19 June 2021 at the Kenyan Olympic trials to secure his place at the delayed 2020 Summer Games. He finished ahead of more established names such as reigning World Champion Timothy Cheruiyot, George Manangoi, Ronald Kwemoi and Bethwell Birgen, amongst others as he ran a personal best time of 3:33:12. That time placed him twelfth in the year worldwide. Ultimately, Etyang was unable to compete at the 2020 Olympics because he didn't have the minimum number of out-of-competition drug tests required for a Kenyan athlete, and his spot was instead given to Timothy Cheruiyot.

Etyang won the 1500m at the Bermuda Games, on the 9 April 2022, at the Flora Duffy Stadium in Devonshire, Bermuda, part of the 2022 World Athletics Continental Tour. He won in a time of 3:45.28 ahead of German Amos Bartelsmeyer in second place. On the 3 June 2022 at the BoXX United Manchester World Athletics Continental Tour event, Etyang finished second in the 1500m event behind Santiago Catrofe of Uruguay who set a new meet record.
