= Vincent Kibet Keter =

Kenyan middle-distance runner

Personal information
- National team: Kenyan
- Born: 11 March 2002 (age 24)

Sport
- Country: Kenya
- Sport: Athletics
- Event: middle-distance running
Medal record
World U20 Championships
Gold medal – first place	2021 Nairobi	1500 m

Vincent Keter (born 11 March 2002) is a Kenyan middle-distance runner who specializes in the 1500 metres. He was the gold medallist at the World Athletics U20 Championships in 2021.

== Personal bests ==
Taken form IAAF Profile

Surface	Event	Time	Date	Venue
Indoor track	1500m		February 9, 2022	Metz, France
Outdoor track	800m	1:47.95	February 5, 2022	Nyayo National Stadium
Outdoor track	1500m	3:31.28	July 16, 2023	Stadion Śląski
Outdoor track	One mile	3:55.41	May 28, 2022	Hayward Field
