= 2020 Golden Gala =

- Dates: 17 September 2020
- Host city: Rome, Italy
- Venue: Stadio Olimpico
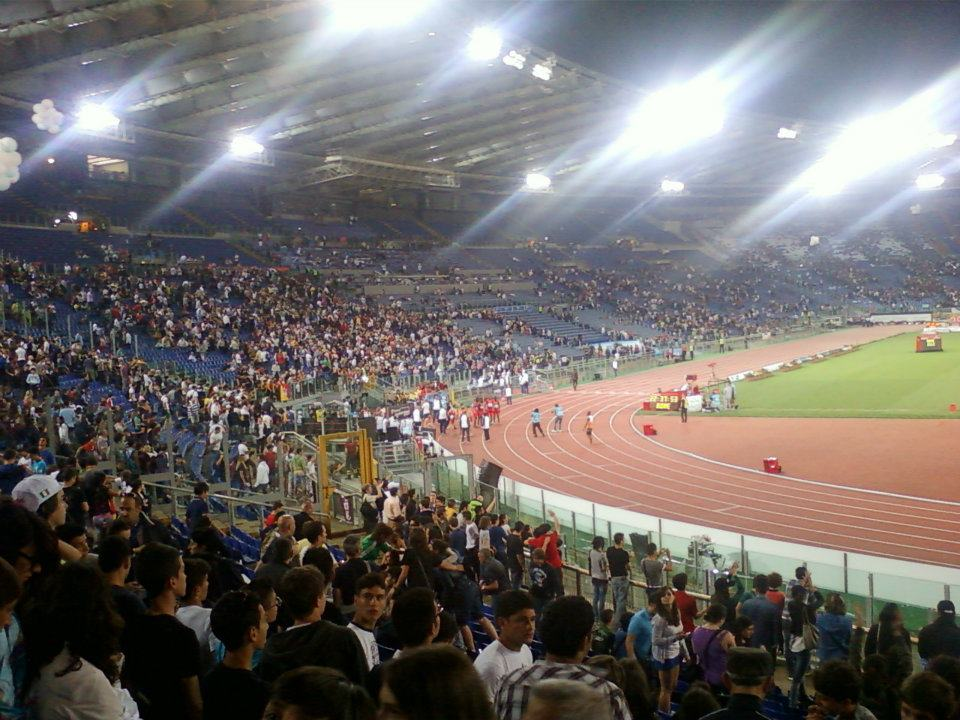
- Level: 2020 Diamond League
- Events: 14 (8 men, 6 women)

The 2020 Golden Gala was the 40th edition of the annual outdoor track and field meeting in Rome, Italy. Held on 17 September at the Stadio Olimpico, it was the seventh leg of the 2020 Diamond League – the highest level international track and field circuit. Originally meant to be staged in Naples, Italy in the month of May, the meet had been delayed and was closed to in-stadium spectators due to the COVID-19 pandemic.

After fourteen attempts prior to the meeting during the outdoor season, the world indoor record holder for Sweden, Mondo Duplantis, set the outdoor world best in the men's pole vault with a height of 6.15 metres. Though the mark was 0.03 less than his indoor record, it was 0.01 more than the previous outdoor best set by Sergey Bubka. Ben Broeders placed second with a height of 5.80 metres, a Belgian record.

A world leading time was also set in the men's 3000 metres by Jacob Kiplimo, winning in 7:26.64 which was also a Diamond League record, a meeting record, and a Ugandan record. The time made the 19-year old #8 on the all-time list, with second place Jakob Ingebrigtsen, also 19 years old, going #9 all-time with a Norwegian record (7:27.05). Australian Stewart McSweyn set an Oceanian record (7:28.02) to place third, with fourth place Yemaneberhan Crippa also setting an Italian record (7:38.27).

Karsten Warholm clocked his fifth sub-48 seconds in the men's 400 metres hurdles in the 2020 season, winning in 47.07 seconds to set a meeting record and the top five times in the event that year.

In the women's events, Elaine Thompson-Herah ran a world leading time in her first international race in the 100 metres with a time of 10.85 seconds, taking one hundredth of a second off fellow Jamaican Shelly-Ann Fraser-Pryce's previous world leading time of 10.86 seconds.

== Results ==
Because of the disrupted season with several cancelled meets, no Diamond League points were awarded for athlete placements.

=== Men ===
Men's 100 Metres (+0.3 m/s)
Place	Athlete	Country	Time
1st place, gold medalist(s)	Akani Simbine	South Africa	9.96
2nd place, silver medalist(s)	Arthur Cissé	Ivory Coast	10.04
3rd place, bronze medalist(s)	Filippo Tortu	Italy	10.09
4	Marcell Jacobs	Italy	10.11
5	Mike Rodgers	United States	10.12
6	Julian Forte	Jamaica	10.15
7	Deniz Almas	Germany	10.27
8	Mouhamadou Fall	France	10.29
9	Mario Burke	Barbados	10.34

Men's 400 Metres
Place	Athlete	Country	Time
1st place, gold medalist(s)	Edoardo Scotti	Italy	45.21 PB
2nd place, silver medalist(s)	Yousef Karam	Kuwait	45.25
3rd place, bronze medalist(s)	Karol Zalewski	Poland	45.48
4	Jochem Dobber	Netherlands	45.64 PB
5	Rabah Yousif	Great Britain	45.65
6	Luka Janežič	Slovenia	45.78
7	Vladimir Aceti	Italy	46.28
8	Kennedy Luchembe	Zambia	46.43
9	Wesley Vázquez	Puerto Rico	46.67 PB

Men's 3000 Metres
Place	Athlete	Country	Time
1st place, gold medalist(s)	Jacob Kiplimo	Uganda	7:26.64 WL DLR MR NR
2nd place, silver medalist(s)	Jakob Ingebrigtsen	Norway	7:27.05 NR
3rd place, bronze medalist(s)	Stewart McSweyn	Australia	7:28.02 AR
4	Yemaneberhan Crippa	Italy	7:38.27 NR
5	Mike Foppen	Netherlands	7:39.75 PB
6	Isaac Kimeli	Belgium	7:47.48 PB
7	Matthew Ramsden	Australia	7:48.08
8	Osama Zoghlami	Italy	7:48.63 PB
9	Pietro Riva	Italy	7:50.03 PB
10	Ryan Gregson	Australia	7:53.65
11	Marouan Razine	Italy	7:54.80
	Mohad Abdikadar	Italy	DNF
	Séan Tobin	Ireland	DNF
	Pietro Arese	Italy	DNF

Men's 110 Metres Hurdles (+0.1 m/s)
Place	Athlete	Country	Time
1st place, gold medalist(s)	Andrew Pozzi	Great Britain	13.15
2nd place, silver medalist(s)	Aaron Mallett	United States	13.23 PB
3rd place, bronze medalist(s)	Freddie Crittenden	United States	13.31
4	Wilhem Belocian	France	13.49
5	Yaqoub Al-Youha	Kuwait	13.60
6	Lorenzo Perini	Italy	13.61
7	Antonio Alkana	South Africa	13.66
8	Gabriel Constantino	Brazil	13.67
9	Paolo Dal Molin	Italy	13.70

Men's 400 Metres Hurdles
Place	Athlete	Country	Time
1st place, gold medalist(s)	Karsten Warholm	Norway	47.07 MR
2nd place, silver medalist(s)	Ludvy Vaillant	France	48.69
3rd place, bronze medalist(s)	Rasmus Mägi	Estonia	48.72
4	David Kendziera	United States	49.35
5	Wilfried Happio	France	49.65
6	Mario Lambrughi	Italy	49.87
7	Constantin Preis	Germany	49.91
8	Nick Smidt	Netherlands	50.67
9	Márcio Teles	Brazil	51.04

Men's High Jump
Place	Athlete	Country	Mark
1st place, gold medalist(s)	Andriy Protsenko	Ukraine	2.30 m
2nd place, silver medalist(s)	Gianmarco Tamberi	Italy	2.27 m
3rd place, bronze medalist(s)	Stefano Sottile	Italy	2.18 m
4	Adrijus Glebauskas	Lithuania	2.18 m
5	Oleh Doroshchuk	Ukraine	2.18 m
6	Matúš Bubeník	Slovakia	2.18 m
7	Sandro Jeršin Tomassini	Slovenia	2.05 m
	Maksim Nedasekau	Belarus	DNS
-	Norbert Kobielski	Poland	DQ

Men's Pole Vault
Place	Athlete	Country	Mark
1st place, gold medalist(s)	Armand Duplantis	Sweden	6.15 m DLR MR
2nd place, silver medalist(s)	Ben Broeders	Belgium	5.80 m NR
3rd place, bronze medalist(s)	EJ Obiena	Philippines	5.80 m
4	Renaud Lavillenie	France	5.70 m
5	Harry Coppell	Great Britain	5.60 m
6	Thibaut Collet	France	5.60 m
7	Raphael Holzdeppe	Germany	5.45 m
	Claudio Stecchi	Italy	DNS

Men's Shot Put
Place	Athlete	Country	Mark
1st place, gold medalist(s)	Nick Ponzio	United States	21.09 m
2nd place, silver medalist(s)	Payton Otterdahl	United States	20.85 m
3rd place, bronze medalist(s)	Leonardo Fabbri	Italy	20.69 m
4	Tsanko Arnaudov	Portugal	20.60 m
5	Konrad Bukowiecki	Poland	20.05 m
6	Bob Bertemes	Luxembourg	20.03 m
7	Zane Weir	Italy	19.43 m
8	Lorenzo del Gatto	Italy	18.27 m
9	Vincenzo D'Agostino	Italy	17.17 m

=== Women ===
Women's 100 Metres (+0.2 m/s)
Place	Athlete	Country	Time
1st place, gold medalist(s)	Elaine Thompson-Herah	Jamaica	10.85 WL
2nd place, silver medalist(s)	Aleia Hobbs	United States	11.12
3rd place, bronze medalist(s)	Marie Josée Ta Lou-Smith	Ivory Coast	11.14
4	Ajla Del Ponte	Switzerland	11.19
5	Imani-Lara Lansiquot	Great Britain	11.23
6	Kayla White	United States	11.27
7	Anna Bongiorni	Italy	11.38
8	Marije van Hunenstijn	Netherlands	11.42
9	Anthonique Strachan	Bahamas	11.42

Women's 400 Metres
Place	Athlete	Country	Time
1st place, gold medalist(s)	Lieke Klaver	Netherlands	50.98 PB
2nd place, silver medalist(s)	Agnė Šerkšnienė	Lithuania	51.80
3rd place, bronze medalist(s)	Justyna Święty-Ersetic	Poland	51.94
4	Corinna Schwab	Germany	52.12
5	Barbora Malíková	Czech Republic	52.17
6	Tiffani Marinho	Brazil	52.44
7	Laviai Nielsen	Great Britain	52.45
8	Alice Mangione	Italy	52.78
9	Rebecca Borga	Italy	52.88

Women's 800 Metres
Place	Athlete	Country	Time
1st place, gold medalist(s)	Jemma Reekie	Great Britain	1:59.76
2nd place, silver medalist(s)	Hedda Hynne	Norway	2:00.24
3rd place, bronze medalist(s)	Laura Muir	Great Britain	2:00.49
4	Christina Hering	Germany	2:00.75
5	Kaela Edwards	United States	2:00.79
6	Alexandra Bell	Great Britain	2:01.37
7	Lore Hoffmann	Switzerland	2:01.46
8	Elena Bellò	Italy	2:02.10
9	Noélie Yarigo	Benin	2:02.98
10	Eleonora Vandi	Italy	2:03.17
	Souliath Saka	Benin	DNF

Women's 100 Metres Hurdles (+0.1 m/s)
Place	Athlete	Country	Time
1st place, gold medalist(s)	Nadine Visser	Netherlands	12.72
2nd place, silver medalist(s)	Luminosa Bogliolo	Italy	12.83
3rd place, bronze medalist(s)	Payton Chadwick	United States	12.89
4	Cindy Sember	Great Britain	13.02
5	Taliyah Brooks	United States	13.05
6	Elisa Di Lazzaro	Italy	13.05 PB
7	Cyréna Samba-Mayela	France	13.29
8	Mette Graversgaard	Denmark	13.30
9	Annimari Korte	Finland	13.34

Women's 400 Metres Hurdles
Place	Athlete	Country	Time
1st place, gold medalist(s)	Femke Bol	Netherlands	53.90
2nd place, silver medalist(s)	Anna Ryzhykova	Ukraine	54.54
3rd place, bronze medalist(s)	Viktoriya Tkachuk	Ukraine	54.93 PB
4	Sara Petersen	Denmark	55.20
5	Amalie Iuel	Norway	55.27
6	Jessie Knight	Great Britain	55.58
7	Emma Zapletalová	Slovakia	56.02
8	Ayomide Folorunso	Italy	56.58

Women's High Jump
Place	Athlete	Country	Mark
1st place, gold medalist(s)	Yuliya Levchenko	Ukraine	1.98 m
2nd place, silver medalist(s)	Yaroslava Mahuchikh	Ukraine	1.95 m
3rd place, bronze medalist(s)	Nicola Olyslagers	Australia	1.95 m
4	Erika Kinsey	Sweden	1.95 m
5	Levern Spencer	Saint Lucia	1.84 m
6	Claire Orcel	Belgium	1.84 m
7	Elena Vallortigara	Italy	1.80 m
	Desirée Rossit	Italy	DNS

== See also ==
- 2020 Doha Diamond League (next and last meet in the 2020 Diamond League)
