= Diamond League =

World athletics tour

Wanda Diamond League
- Current season, competition or edition: 2026 Diamond League
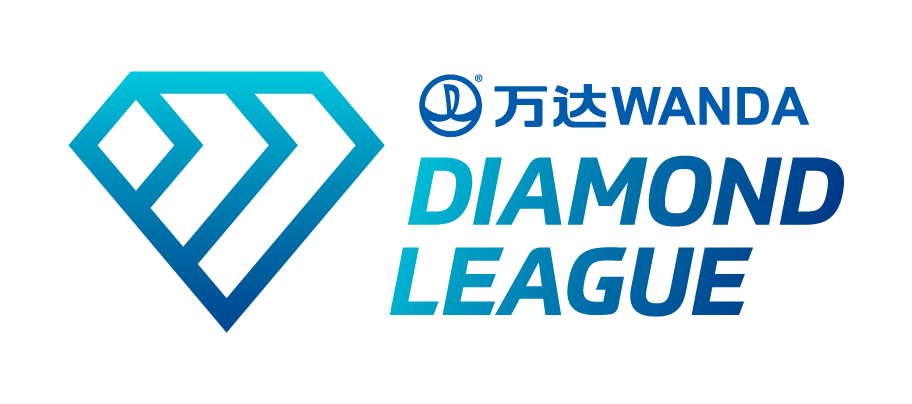
- Sport: Athletics
- Founded: 2010
- CEO: Petr Stastny
- Continent: Europe, Asia, North America, Africa
- Website: diamondleague.com

The Diamond League is an annual series of elite track and field athletic competitions comprising fifteen invitational athletics meetings. The series sits in the top tier of the World Athletics one-day meet competitions.

The inaugural season was in 2010. It was designed to replace the IAAF Golden League, which had been held annually since 1998. The full sponsorship name is the Wanda Diamond League, the result of an agreement with Wanda Group that was announced in December 2019.

While the Golden League was formed to increase the profile of the leading European athletics competitions, the Diamond League's aim is to "enhance the worldwide appeal of athletics by going outside Europe for the first time." In addition to the original Golden League members (except Berlin) and other traditional European competitions, the series now includes events in China, Qatar, Morocco, and the United States.

Beginning in March 2022, after the 2022 Russian invasion of Ukraine, the Diamond League excluded Russian and Belarusian athletes from all of its track and field meetings.

== Editions ==
| Edition | Year | Meets | Diamond Disciplines | Start date | End date |
|---|---|---|---|---|---|
| 1 | 2010 | 14 | 32 | 14 May | 27 August |
| 2 | 2011 | 14 | 32 | 6 May | 16 September |
| 3 | 2012 | 14 | 32 | 11 May | 7 September |
| 4 | 2013 | 14 | 32 | 10 May | 6 September |
| 5 | 2014 | 14 | 32 | 9 May | 5 September |
| 6 | 2015 | 14 | 32 | 15 May | 11 September |
| 7 | 2016 | 14 | 32 | 6 May | 9 September |
| 8 | 2017 | 14 | 32 | 5 May | 1 September |
| 9 | 2018 | 14 | 32 | 4 May | 31 August |
| 10 | 2019 | 14 | 32 | 3 May | 6 September |
| 11 | 2020 | 8 | ~~24~~ | 11 June | 25 September |
| 12 | 2021 | 14 | 32 | 23 May | 9 September |
| 13 | 2022 | 13 | 32 | 13 May | 8 September |
| 14 | 2023 | 14 | 32 | 5 May | 17 September |
| 15 | 2024 | 15 | 32 | 20 April | 14 September |
| 16 | 2025 | 15 | 32 | 26 April | 28 August |
| 17 | 2026 | 15 | 32 | 8 May | 6 September |
| 18 | 2027 | 15 | 32 | 7 May | 26 August |

=== Order of meetings ===
| Year | Doha | Shanghai (Suzhou / Shaoxing) | Oslo | Rome (Florence) | New York | Eugene (Stanford) | Lausanne | Great Britain | Paris | Monaco | Stockholm | London (Glasgow / Gateshead / Birmingham) | Zurich | Brussels | Rabat (Marrakesh) | Chorzów (Silesia) | Xiamen |
|---|---|---|---|---|---|---|---|---|---|---|---|---|---|---|---|---|---|
| 2010 | 1 | 2 | 3 | 4 | 5 | 6 | 7 | 8 | 9 | 10 | 11 | 12 | 13 | 14 | —N/a | —N/a | —N/a |
| 2011 | 1 | 2 | 5 | 3 | 6 | 4 | 7 | 9 | 8 | 10 | 11 | 12 | 13 | 14 | —N/a | —N/a | —N/a |
| 2012 | 1 | 2 | 5 | 3 | 6 | 4 | 11 | 12 | 7 | 9 | 10 | 7 | 13 | 14 | —N/a | —N/a | —N/a |
| 2013 | 1 | 2 | 6 | 5 | 3 | 4 | 8 | 7 | 9 | 10 | 12 | 11 | 13 | 14 | —N/a | —N/a | —N/a |
| 2014 | 1 | 2 | 5 | 4 | 6 | 3 | 7 | 12 | 8 | 10 | 11 | 9 | 13 | 14 | —N/a | —N/a | —N/a |
| 2015 | 1 | 2 | 6 | 4 | 7 | 3 | 9 | 5 | 8 | 10 | 12 | 11 | 13 | 14 | —N/a | —N/a | —N/a |
| 2016 | 1 | 2 | 7 | 5 | —N/a | 4 | 11 | 6 | 12 | 9 | 8 | 10 | 13 | 14 | 3 | —N/a | —N/a |
| 2017 | 1 | 2 | 5 | 4 | —N/a | 3 | 8 | 12 | 7 | 11 | 6 | 9 | 13 | 14 | 10 | —N/a | —N/a |
| 2018 | 1 | 2 | 5 | 4 | —N/a | 3 | 8 | 12 | 7 | 10 | 6 | 11 | 13 | 14 | 9 | —N/a | —N/a |
| 2019 | 1 | 2 | 5 | 4 | —N/a | 7 | 8 | 11 | 12 | 9 | 3 | 10 | 13 | 14 | 6 | —N/a | —N/a |
| 2020 | 8 | —N/a | 1 | 7 | —N/a | —N/a | 5 | —N/a | —N/a | 3 | 4 | —N/a | 2 | 6 | —N/a | —N/a | —N/a |
| 2021 | 2 | —N/a | 4 | 3 | —N/a | 8 | 9 | 1 | 10 | 6 | 5 | 7 | 12 | 11 | —N/a | —N/a | —N/a |
| 2022 | 1 | —N/a | 6 | 5 | —N/a | 3 | 11 | —N/a | 7 | 10 | 8 | 2 | 13 | 12 | 4 | 9 | —N/a |
| 2023 | 1 | —N/a | 5 | 3 | —N/a | 14 | 6 | —N/a | 4 | 9 | 7 | 10 | 11 | 13 | 2 | 8 | 12 |
| 2024 | 3 | 2 | 6 | 13 | —N/a | 5 | 11 | —N/a | 8 | 9 | 7 | 10 | 14 | 15 | 4 | 12 | 1 |
| 2025 | 3 | 2 | 6 | 5 | —N/a | 9 | 13 | —N/a | 8 | 10 | 7 | 11 | 15 | 14 | 4 | 12 | 1 |
| 2026 | 7 | 1 | 6 | 4 | —N/a | 9 | 12 | —N/a | 8 | 10 | 5 | 11 | 14 | 15 | 3 | 13 | 2 |
| 2027 | 1 | 2 | 6 | 4 | —N/a | 9 | 11 | —N/a | 8 | 10 | 7 | 12 | 15 | 14 | 5 | 13 | 3 |

The number in the table represents the order in which the meeting took place.

== Format ==
=== Scoring system ===
The original Diamond League scoring system, used from 2010 to 2015, awarded points to the top three athletes at each meeting (4 points for first place; 2 points for second place; 1 point for third place). Each of the thirty-two disciplines (sixteen each for male and female athletes) was staged a total of seven times during the season; points scored in the final meeting for that discipline (either Zürich or Brussels) were doubled. The athletes who finished the season with the highest number of points in their discipline won the "Diamond Race"; in case of a tie on points, the number of victories was used as the first tie-breaker, followed by the results of the final. Only athletes who competed in their discipline's final meeting were eligible to win the Diamond Race. In 2016 scoring was expanded to the top six (10–6–4–3–2–1); double points (20–12–8–6–4–2) were still awarded in the event finals.

A completely new system was introduced in 2017; the top eight athletes at each meeting are now awarded points (8–7–6–5–4–3–2–1), but these points only determine which athletes qualify for the discipline finals in Zürich and Brussels. The athletes who win at the finals are declared IAAF Diamond League Champions, and the allocation of the overall prize money is likewise determined solely by the results of the final. This system, with the winner of the final automatically winning the overall championship, is similar to the former IAAF Grand Prix circuit with its Grand Prix Final. As part of the scoring changes, the term 'Diamond Race' is no longer used. Instead, athletes compete in 'Diamond Disciplines' to become the Diamond League champion.

After the 2019 season, the final format changed from being held by two separate meets to one two-day meet. Since then, the Diamond League Final has rotated between Zürich or Brussels, with the exception of 2023, when the Diamond League Final was held in Eugene.

=== Pandemic season ===
In March 2019 the president of the IAAF, Sebastian Coe, announced changes in the Diamond League's format for the 2020 series. The number of Diamond Disciplines was reduced from 32 to 24 and a second Chinese meet was added to the calendar. The dual final format was replaced by a single final. However, because of the COVID-19 pandemic, 7 of the originally planned 15 meets were cancelled, the season was delayed to June 10, only four or the meets had a full competitive program, and the final was cancelled with no champions crowned in 2020. In December 2020, the 2021 Diamond League was announced to return with 32 disciplines and a two-hour broadcast window.

=== "Final 3" format ===
In the "Final 3" format for horizontal jumping and throwing events, only the top-3 athletes after five rounds get a trial in the last round. Originally, only that final attempt then determined the ranking of the top-3 athletes, regardless of previous marks. The format was first tested at two World Athletics Indoor Tour meetings in 2020 and received ample criticism from athletes prior to its first implementation in the Diamond League at the 2020 Bauhausgalan.

Nonetheless in December 2020, the format was adopted throughout the 2021 Diamond League season, except for the final in Zürich. World Athletics president Sebastian Coe defended the decision as an attempt to make "sure that we haven't got field events that are dying" by raising the stakes of the final round, and made the comparison to track events where results in prior rounds are also not taken into consideration when ranking runners in the final. Coe did however quell earlier concerns that the controversial format could also be adopted at the Olympic Games and World Championships, and confirmed it would be reviewed at the end of the 2021 season.

In December 2021, the revised "Final 3" format was announced: as before only the top-3 athletes after five rounds get a final trial, but all marks determine the ranking of those athletes rather than just their results in the last round. However, the competing order for rounds 4 and 5 and for round 6 is changed by descending marks in the preceding three resp. five rounds (contrary to the usual ascending order). This format continues to be used from the 2022 season onwards.

Both the original and revised formats were the subject of academic studies into their effects on fairness and jumping strategies.

== Meetings ==
All meetings since the event's inauguration have been held in the Northern Hemisphere in spring and summer months, in line with the traditional international track and field season.

Diamond League meetings
| # | Meeting | Arena | City | Country | 2010 | 2011 | 2012 | 2013 | 2014 | 2015 | 2016 | 2017 | 2018 | 2019 | 2020 | 2021 | 2022 | 2023 | 2024 | 2025 | 2026 | 2027 |
|---|---|---|---|---|---|---|---|---|---|---|---|---|---|---|---|---|---|---|---|---|---|---|
| 18 | Athletissima | Stade Olympique de la Pontaise | Lausanne | Switzerland | • | • | • | • | • | • | • | • | • | • | • | • | • | • | • | • | • | • |
| 18 | Bauhausgalan | Stockholm Olympic Stadium | Stockholm | Sweden | • | • | • | • | • | • | • | • | • | • | • | • | • | • | • | • | • | • |
| 18 | Bislett Games | Bislett Stadium | Oslo | Norway | • | • | • | • | • | • | • | • | • | • | • | • | • | • | • | • | • | • |
| 18 | Doha Diamond League | Qatar Sports Club | Doha | Qatar | • | • | • | • | • | • | • | • | • | • | • | • | • | • | • | • | • | • |
| 18 | Golden Gala | Stadio Olimpico | Rome (Florence) | Italy | • | • | • | • | • | • | • | • | • | • | • | • | • | • | • | • | • | • |
| 18 | Herculis | Stade Louis-II | Fontvieille | Monaco | • | • | • | • | • | • | • | • | • | • | • | • | • | • | • | • | • | • |
| 18 | Memorial Van Damme | King Baudouin Stadium | Brussels | Belgium | • | • | • | • | • | • | • | • | • | • | • | • | • | • | • | • | • | • |
| 18 | Weltklasse Zürich | Letzigrund | Zürich | Switzerland | • | • | • | • | • | • | • | • | • | • | • | • | • | • | • | • | • | • |
| 17 | London Athletics Meet | London Stadium | London (Glasgow / Gateshead / Birmingham) | UK | • | • | • | • | • | • | • | • | • | • | | • | • | • | • | • | • | • |
| 17 | Meeting de Paris | Stade Sébastien Charléty | Paris | France | • | • | • | • | • | • | • | • | • | • | | • | • | • | • | • | • | • |
| 17 | Prefontaine Classic | Hayward Field | Eugene (Stanford) | US | • | • | • | • | • | • | • | • | • | • | | • | • | • | • | • | • | • |
| 14 | Diamond League Shanghai | Shanghai Stadium / Suzhou Olympic Sports Centre / Shaoxing China Textile City Sports Center | Shanghai (Suzhou / Shaoxing) | China | • | • | • | • | • | • | • | • | • | • | | | | | • | • | • | • |
| 11 | British Grand Prix | International Stadium / Alexander Stadium | Gateshead / Birmingham | UK | • | • | • | • | • | • | • | • | • | • | | • | | | | | | |
| 10 | Meeting de Rabat | Prince Moulay Abdellah Stadium | Rabat (Marrakesh) | Morocco | | | | | | | • | • | • | • | | | • | • | • | • | • | • |
| 6 | Adidas Grand Prix | Icahn Stadium | New York City | US | • | • | • | • | • | • | | | | | | | | | | | | |
| 6 | Kamila Skolimowska Memorial | Silesia Stadium | Chorzów (Silesia) | Poland | | | | | | | | | | | | | • | • | • | • | • | • |
| 5 | Xiamen Diamond League | Xiamen Egret Stadium | Xiamen | China | | | | | | | | | | | | | | • | • | • | • | • |

- From 2011 to 2019 the British Grand Prix was held at the Alexander Stadium, Birmingham.
- The 2010 to 2016 Meeting de Paris was held at the Stade de France.
- In 2016 the Adidas Grand Prix in New York City was removed in favour of the Rabat leg (the first African meet of the series). The 2024 event was moved to Marrakesh Stadium in Marrakesh.
- The 2019 Prefontaine Classic moved from Eugene to Cobb Track and Angell Field in Stanford due to the reconstruction of Hayward Field.
- The 2019 Doha Diamond League was held at Khalifa International Stadium.
- In 2021 and 2023, the Golden Gala moved from Rome to Stadio Luigi Ridolfi in Florence.
- Meetings may hold non-Diamond League race events, e.g. the 10,000 m in Stockholm on 30 May 2019.
- Diamond League meetings in Shanghai and Shenzhen were planned for 2020, 2021, 2022 and 2023 but were cancelled due to the COVID-19 pandemic. The 2024 Diamond League Shanghai was moved to Suzhou Olympic Sports Centre in Suzhou. The 2025 Shanghai Diamond League was moved to Shaoxing China Textile City Sports Center in Shaoxing.
- A meeting in Chorzów was scheduled instead from 2022.
- A meeting in Xiamen was scheduled instead from 2023.

== Diamond League winners ==
=== Men's track ===
| Year | 100 m | 200 m | 400 m | 800 m | 1500 m | 5000 m | 110 m h | 400 m h | 3000 m st |
| 2010 | Tyson Gay (USA) | Wallace Spearmon (USA) | Jeremy Wariner (USA) | David Rudisha (KEN) (1/2) | Asbel Kiprop (KEN) (1/3) | Imane Merga (ETH) (1/2) | David Oliver (USA) (1/3) | Bershawn Jackson (USA) (1/2) | Paul Kipsiele Koech (KEN) (1/3) |
| 2011 | Asafa Powell (JAM) (1/2) | Walter Dix (USA) | Kirani James (GRN) (1/4) | David Rudisha (KEN) (2/2) | Nixon Chepseba (KEN) | Imane Merga (ETH) (2/2) | (CUB) Dayron Robles | David Greene (GBR) | Paul Kipsiele Koech (KEN) (2/3) |
| 2012 | Usain Bolt (JAM) | Nickel Ashmeade (JAM) | Kevin Borlée (BEL) | Mohammed Aman (ETH) (1/2) | Silas Kiplagat (KEN) (1/2) | Isiah Koech (KEN) | Aries Merritt (USA) | Javier Culson (PUR) (1/2) | Paul Kipsiele Koech (KEN) (3/3) |
| 2013 | Justin Gatlin (USA) (1/3) | Warren Weir (JAM) | LaShawn Merritt (USA) (1/3) | Mohammed Aman (ETH) (2/2) | Ayanleh Souleiman (DJI) | Yenew Alamirew (ETH) | David Oliver (USA) (2/3) | Javier Culson (PUR) (2/2) | Conseslus Kipruto (KEN) (1/4) |
| 2014 | Justin Gatlin (USA) (2/3) | Alonso Edward (PAN) (1/3) | LaShawn Merritt (USA) (2/3) | Nijel Amos (BOT) (1/3) | Silas Kiplagat (KEN) (2/2) | Caleb Mwangangi Ndiku (KEN) | Pascal Martinot-Lagarde (FRA) | Michael Tinsley (USA) | Jairus Kipchoge Birech (KEN) (1/2) |
| 2015 | Justin Gatlin (USA) (3/3) | Alonso Edward (PAN) (2/3) | Kirani James (GRN) (2/4) | Nijel Amos (BOT) (2/3) | Asbel Kiprop (KEN) (2/3) | Yomif Kejelcha (ETH) | David Oliver (USA) (3/3) | Bershawn Jackson (USA) (2/2) | Jairus Kipchoge Birech (KEN) (2/2) |
| 2016 | Asafa Powell (JAM) (2/2) | Alonso Edward (PAN) (3/3) | LaShawn Merritt (USA) (3/3) | Ferguson Cheruiyot Rotich (KEN) | Asbel Kiprop (KEN) (3/3) | Hagos Gebrhiwet (ETH) | Orlando Ortega (ESP) (1/2) | Kerron Clement (USA) | Conseslus Kipruto (KEN) (2/4) |
| 2017 | Chijindu Ujah (GBR) | Noah Lyles (USA) (1/5) | Isaac Makwala (BOT) | Nijel Amos (BOT) (3/3) | Timothy Cheruiyot (KEN) (1/4) | Mo Farah (GBR) | Sergey Shubenkov (ANA) (1/2) | Kyron McMaster (IVB) (1/2) | Conseslus Kipruto (KEN) (3/4) |
| 2018 | Christian Coleman (USA) (1/3) | Noah Lyles (USA) (2/5) | Fred Kerley (USA) | Emmanuel Korir (KEN) (1/3) | Timothy Cheruiyot (KEN) (2/4) | Selemon Barega (ETH) | Sergey Shubenkov (ANA) (2/2) | Kyron McMaster (IVB) (2/2) | Conseslus Kipruto (KEN) (4/4) |
| 2019 | Noah Lyles (USA) | Noah Lyles (USA) (3/5) | Michael Norman (USA) | Donavan Brazier (USA) | Timothy Cheruiyot (KEN) (3/4) | Joshua Cheptegei (UGA) | Orlando Ortega (ESP) (2/2) | Karsten Warholm (NOR) (1/3) | Getnet Wale (ETH) |
| 2020 | —N/a | —N/a | —N/a | —N/a | —N/a | —N/a | —N/a | —N/a | —N/a |
| 2021 | Fred Kerley (USA) | Kenneth Bednarek (USA) (1/3) | Michael Cherry (USA) | Emmanuel Korir (KEN) (2/3) | Timothy Cheruiyot (KEN) (4/4) | Berihu Aregawi (ETH) (1/2) | Devon Allen (USA) | Karsten Warholm (NOR) (2/3) | Benjamin Kigen (KEN) |
| 2022 | Trayvon Bromell (USA) | Noah Lyles (USA) (4/5) | Kirani James (GRN) (3/4) | Emmanuel Korir (KEN) (3/3) | Jakob Ingebrigtsen (NOR) (1/3) | Nicholas Kipkorir Kimeli (KEN) | Grant Holloway (USA) | Alison dos Santos (BRA) (1/3) | Soufiane El Bakkali (MAR) |
| 2023 | Christian Coleman (USA) (2/3) | Andre de Grasse (CAN) | Kirani James (GRN) (4/4) | Emmanuel Wanyonyi (KEN) (1/4) | Jakob Ingebrigtsen (NOR) (2/3) | Jakob Ingebrigtsen (NOR) | Hansle Parchment (JAM) | Rai Benjamin (USA) | Simon Kiprop Koech (KEN) |
| 2024 | Ackeem Blake (JAM) | Kenneth Bednarek (USA) (2/3) | Charlie Dobson (GBR) | Emmanuel Wanyonyi (KEN) (2/4) | Jakob Ingebrigtsen (NOR) (3/3) | Berihu Aregawi (ETH) (2/2) | Sasha Zhoya (FRA) | Alison dos Santos (BRA) (2/3) | Amos Serem (KEN) |
| 2025 | Christian Coleman (USA) (3/3) | Noah Lyles (USA) (5/5) | Jacory Patterson (USA) | Emmanuel Wanyonyi (KEN) (3/4) | Niels Laros (NED) | Jimmy Gressier (FRA) | Cordell Tinch (USA) | Karsten Warholm (NOR) (3/3) | Frederik Ruppert (GER) |
| 2026 | Oblique Seville (JAM) | Kenneth Bednarek (USA) (3/3) | Collen Kebinatshipi (BOT) | Emmanuel Wanyonyi (KEN) (4/4) | Cameron Myers (AUS) | Birhanu Balew (BHR) | Ja'Kobe Tharp (USA) | Alison dos Santos (BRA) (3/3) | Gemechu Godana (ETH) |

=== Men's field ===
| Year | Long jump | Triple jump | High jump | Pole vault | Shot put | Discus | Javelin |
| 2010 | Dwight Phillips (USA) | Teddy Tamgho (FRA) | Ivan Ukhov (RUS) | Renaud Lavillenie (FRA) (1/7) | Christian Cantwell (USA) | Piotr Małachowski (POL) (1/4) | Andreas Thorkildsen (NOR) |
| 2011 | Mitchell Watt (AUS) | Phillips Idowu (GBR) | Jesse Williams (USA) | Renaud Lavillenie (FRA) (2/7) | Dylan Armstrong (CAN) | Virgilijus Alekna (LTU) | Matthias de Zordo (GER) |
| 2012 | Aleksandr Menkov (RUS) (1/2) | Christian Taylor (USA) (1/7) | Robert Grabarz (GBR) | Renaud Lavillenie (FRA) (3/7) | Reese Hoffa (USA) (1/2) | Gerd Kanter (EST) (1/2) | Vítězslav Veselý (CZE) (1/2) |
| 2013 | Aleksandr Menkov (RUS) (2/2) | Christian Taylor (USA) (2/7) | Bohdan Bondarenko (UKR) | Renaud Lavillenie (FRA) (4/7) | Ryan Whiting (USA) | Gerd Kanter (EST) (2/2) | Vítězslav Veselý (CZE) (2/2) |
| 2014 | Godfrey Khotso Mokoena (RSA) | Christian Taylor (USA) (3/7) | Mutaz Essa Barshim (QAT) (1/3) | Renaud Lavillenie (FRA) (5/7) | Reese Hoffa (USA) (2/2) | Piotr Małachowski (POL) (2/4) | Thomas Röhler (GER) |
| 2015 | Greg Rutherford (GBR) | Christian Taylor (USA) (4/7) | Mutaz Essa Barshim (QAT) (2/3) | Renaud Lavillenie (FRA) (6/7) | Joe Kovacs (USA) (1/4) | Piotr Małachowski (POL) (3/4) | Tero Pitkämäki (FIN) |
| 2016 | Fabrice Lapierre (AUS) | Christian Taylor (USA) (5/7) | Erik Kynard (USA) | Renaud Lavillenie (FRA) (7/7) | Tom Walsh (NZL) (1/3) | Piotr Małachowski (POL) (4/4) | Jakub Vadlejch (CZE) (1/3) |
| 2017 | Luvo Manyonga (RSA) (1/2) | Christian Taylor (USA) (6/7) | Mutaz Essa Barshim (QAT) (3/3) | Sam Kendricks (USA) (1/2) | Darrell Hill (USA) | Andrius Gudžius (LTU) | Jakub Vadlejch (CZE) (2/3) |
| 2018 | Luvo Manyonga (RSA) (2/2) | Pedro Pichardo (POR) (1/3) | Brandon Starc (AUS) | Timur Morgunov (ANA) | Tomas Walsh (NZL) (2/3) | Fedrick Dacres (JAM) | Andreas Hofmann (GER) |
| 2019 | Juan Miguel Echevarría (CUB) | Christian Taylor (USA) (7/7) | Andriy Protsenko (UKR) | Sam Kendricks (USA) (2/2) | Tomas Walsh (NZL) (3/3) | Daniel Ståhl (SWE) (1/2) | Magnus Kirt (EST) |
| 2020 | —N/a | —N/a | —N/a | —N/a | —N/a | —N/a | —N/a |
| 2021 | Thobias Montler (SWE) | Pedro Pichardo (POR) (2/3) | Gianmarco Tamberi (ITA) (1/3) | Armand Duplantis (SWE) (1/5) | Ryan Crouser (USA) | Daniel Ståhl (SWE) (2/2) | Johannes Vetter (GER) |
| 2022 | Miltiadis Tentoglou (GRE) | Andy Díaz Hernández (CUB) (1/4) | Gianmarco Tamberi (ITA) (2/3) | Armand Duplantis (SWE) (2/5) | Joe Kovacs (USA) (2/4) | Kristjan Čeh (SLO) (1/2) | Neeraj Chopra (IND) |
| 2023 | Simon Ehammer (SUI) (1/2) | Andy Díaz Hernández (ITA) (2/4) | Woo Sang-hyeok (KOR) | Armand Duplantis (SWE) (3/5) | Joe Kovacs (USA) (3/4) | Matthew Denny (AUS) (1/2) | Jakub Vadlejch (CZE) (3/3) |
| 2024 | Tajay Gayle (JAM) (1/2) | Pedro Pichardo (POR) (3/3) | Gianmarco Tamberi (ITA) (3/3) | Armand Duplantis (SWE) (4/5) | Leonardo Fabbri (ITA) | Matthew Denny (AUS) (2/2) | Anderson Peters (GRN) |
| 2025 | Simon Ehammer (SUI) (2/2) | Andy Díaz Hernández (ITA) (3/4) | Hamish Kerr (NZL) | Armand Duplantis (SWE) (5/5) | Joe Kovacs (USA) (4/4) | Mykolas Alekna (LTU) | Julian Weber (GER) |
| 2026 | Tajay Gayle (JAM) (2/2) | Andy Díaz Hernández (ITA) (4/4) | Mateusz Kołodziejski (POL) | Emmanouil Karalis (GRE) | Rajindra Campbell (JAM) | Kristjan Čeh (SLO) (2/2) | Rumesh Tharanga Pathirage (SRI) |

=== Women's track ===
| Year | 100 m | 200 m | 400 m | 800 m | 1500 m | 5000 m | 100 m h | 400 m h | 3000 m st |
| 2010 | Carmelita Jeter (USA) (1/2) | Allyson Felix (USA) (1/3) | Allyson Felix (USA) | Janeth Jepkosgei (KEN) | Nancy Langat (KEN) | Vivian Cheruiyot (KEN) (1/3) | Priscilla Lopes-Schliep (CAN) | Kaliese Spencer (JAM) (1/4) | Milcah Cheywa (KEN) (1/4) |
| 2011 | Carmelita Jeter (USA) (2/2) | Carmelita Jeter (USA) | Amantle Montsho (BOT) (1/3) | Jennifer Meadows (GBR) | Morgan Uceny (USA) | Vivian Cheruiyot (KEN) (2/3) | Danielle Carruthers (USA) | Kaliese Spencer (JAM) (2/4) | Milcah Cheywa (KEN) (2/4) |
| 2012 | Shelly-Ann Fraser-Pryce (JAM) (1/4) | Charonda Williams (USA) | Amantle Montsho (BOT) (2/3) | Pamela Jelimo (KEN) | Abeba Aregawi (ETH) (1/2) | Vivian Cheruiyot (KEN) (3/3) | Dawn Harper (USA) (1/4) | Kaliese Spencer (JAM) (3/4) | Milcah Cheywa (KEN) (3/4) |
| 2013 | Shelly-Ann Fraser-Pryce (JAM) (2/4) | Shelly-Ann Fraser-Pryce (JAM) | Amantle Montsho (BOT) (3/3) | Eunice Jepkoech Sum (KEN) (1/3) | Abeba Aregawi (SWE) (2/2) | Meseret Defar (ETH) | Dawn Harper-Nelson (USA) (2/4) | Zuzana Hejnová (CZE) (1/2) | Milcah Cheywa (KEN) (4/4) |
| 2014 | Veronica Campbell Brown (JAM) | Allyson Felix (USA) (2/3) | Novlene Williams-Mills (JAM) | Eunice Jepkoech Sum (KEN) (2/3) | Jennifer Simpson (USA) | Mercy Cherono (KEN) | Dawn Harper-Nelson (USA) (3/4) | Kaliese Spencer (JAM) (4/4) | Hiwot Ayalew (ETH) |
| 2015 | Shelly-Ann Fraser-Pryce (JAM) (3/4) | Allyson Felix (USA) (3/3) | Francena McCorory (USA) | Eunice Jepkoech Sum (KEN) (3/3) | Sifan Hassan (NED) (1/2) | Genzebe Dibaba (ETH) | Dawn Harper-Nelson (USA) (4/4) | Zuzana Hejnová (CZE) (2/2) | Virginia Nyambura (KEN) |
| 2016 | Elaine Thompson (JAM) (1/3) | Dafne Schippers (NED) | Stephenie Ann McPherson (JAM) | Caster Semenya (RSA) (1/3) | Laura Muir (GBR) (1/2) | Almaz Ayana (ETH) | Kendra Harrison (USA) | Cassandra Tate (USA) | Ruth Jebet (BHR) (1/2) |
| 2017 | Elaine Thompson (JAM) (2/3) | Shaunae Miller-Uibo (BAH) (1/3) | Shaunae Miller-Uibo (BAH) | Caster Semenya (RSA) (2/3) | Faith Kipyegon (KEN) (1/5) | Hellen Obiri (KEN) (1/2) | Sally Pearson (AUS) | Dalilah Muhammad (USA) (1/2) | Ruth Jebet (BHR) (2/2) |
| 2018 | Murielle Ahouré (CIV) | Shaunae Miller-Uibo (BAH) (2/3) | Salwa Eid Naser (BHR) (1/3) | Caster Semenya (RSA) (3/3) | Laura Muir (GBR) (2/2) | Hellen Obiri (KEN) (2/2) | Brianna McNeal (USA) | Dalilah Muhammad (USA) (2/2) | Beatrice Chepkoech (KEN) (1/2) |
| 2019 | Dina Asher-Smith (GBR) | Shaunae Miller-Uibo (BAH) (3/3) | Salwa Eid Naser (BHR) (2/3) | Ajeé Wilson (USA) | Sifan Hassan (NED) (2/2) | Sifan Hassan (NED) | Danielle Williams (JAM) | Sydney McLaughlin (USA) | Beatrice Chepkoech (KEN) (2/2) |
| 2020 | —N/a | —N/a | —N/a | —N/a | —N/a | —N/a | —N/a | —N/a | —N/a |
| 2021 | Elaine Thompson-Herah (JAM) (3/3) | Christine Mboma (NAM) | Quanera Hayes (USA) | Keely Hodgkinson (GBR) (1/2) | Faith Kipyegon (KEN) (2/5) | Francine Niyonsaba (BDI) | Tobi Amusan (NGR) (1/3) | Femke Bol (NED) (1/5) | Norah Jeruto (KEN) |
| 2022 | Shelly-Ann Fraser-Pryce (JAM) (4/4) | Shericka Jackson (JAM) (1/2) | Marileidy Paulino (DOM) (1/4) | Mary Moraa (KEN) (1/2) | Faith Kipyegon (KEN) (3/5) | Beatrice Chebet (KEN) (1/2) | Tobi Amusan (NGR) (2/3) | Femke Bol (NED) (2/5) | Werkuha Getachew (ETH) |
| 2023 | Shericka Jackson (JAM) | Shericka Jackson (JAM) (2/2) | Marileidy Paulino (DOM) (2/4) | Keely Hodgkinson (GBR)^{[a]} (2/2) | Faith Kipyegon (KEN) (4/5) | Gudaf Tsegay (ETH) | Tobi Amusan (NGR) (3/3) | Femke Bol (NED) (3/5) | Winfred Yavi (BHR) |
| 2024 | Julien Alfred (LCA) (1/2) | Brittany Brown (USA) (1/2) | Marileidy Paulino (DOM) (3/4) | Mary Moraa (KEN) (2/2) | Faith Kipyegon (KEN) (5/5) | Beatrice Chebet (KEN) (2/2) | Jasmine Camacho-Quinn (PUR) | Femke Bol (NED) (4/5) | Faith Cherotich (KEN) (1/3) |
| 2025 | Julien Alfred (LCA) (2/2) | Brittany Brown (USA) (2/2) | Salwa Eid Naser (BHR) (3/3) | Audrey Werro (SUI) (1/2) | Nelly Chepchirchir (KEN) | Fantaye Belayneh (ETH) | Ackera Nugent (JAM) | Femke Bol (NED) (5/5) | Faith Cherotich (KEN) (2/3) |
| 2026 | Tina Clayton (JAM) | Julien Alfred (LCA) | Marileidy Paulino (DOM) (4/4) | Audrey Werro (SUI) (2/2) | Klaudia Kazimierska (POL) | Freweyni Hailu (ETH) | Masai Russell (USA) | Anna Cockrell (USA) | Faith Cherotich (KEN) (3/3) |

=== Women's field ===
| Year | Long jump | Triple jump | High jump | Pole vault | Shot put | Discus | Javelin |
| 2010 | Brittney Reese (USA) (1/2) | Yargelis Savigne (CUB) | Blanka Vlašić (CRO) (1/2) | Fabiana Murer (BRA) (1/2) | Valerie Adams (NZL) (1/6) | Yarelys Barrios (CUB) (1/2) | Barbora Špotáková (CZE) (1/5) |
| 2011 | Brittney Reese (USA) (2/2) | Olha Saladuha (UKR) | Blanka Vlašić (CRO) (2/2) | Silke Spiegelburg (GER) (1/3) | Valerie Adams (NZL) (2/6) | Yarelys Barrios (CUB) (2/2) | Christina Obergföll (GER) (1/2) |
| 2012 | Yelena Sokolova (RUS) | Olga Rypakova (KAZ) (1/2) | Chaunté Lowe (USA) | Silke Spiegelburg (GER) (2/3) | Valerie Adams (NZL) (3/6) | Sandra Perković (CRO) (1/6) | Barbora Špotáková (CZE) (2/5) |
| 2013 | Shara Proctor (GBR) | Caterine Ibargüen (COL) (1/5) | Svetlana Shkolina (RUS) | Silke Spiegelburg (GER) (3/3) | Valerie Adams (NZL) (4/6) | Sandra Perković (CRO) (2/6) | Christina Obergföll (GER) (2/2) |
| 2014 | Tianna Bartoletta (USA) (1/2) | Caterine Ibargüen (COL) (2/5) | Mariya Kuchina (RUS) (1/5) | Fabiana Murer (BRA) (2/2) | Valerie Adams (NZL) (5/6) | Sandra Perković (CRO) (3/6) | Barbora Špotáková (CZE) (3/5) |
| 2015 | Tianna Bartoletta (USA) (2/2) | Caterine Ibargüen (COL) (3/5) | Ruth Beitia (ESP) (1/2) | Nikoleta Kyriakopoulou (GRE) | Christina Schwanitz (GER) | Sandra Perković (CRO) (4/6) | Barbora Špotáková (CZE) (4/5) |
| 2016 | Ivana Španović (SRB) (1/5) | Caterine Ibargüen (COL) (4/5) | Ruth Beitia (ESP) (2/2) | Katerina Stefanidi (GRE) (1/4) | Valerie Adams (NZL) (6/6) | Sandra Perković (CRO) (5/6) | Madara Palameika (LAT) |
| 2017 | Ivana Španović (SRB) (2/5) | Olga Rypakova (KAZ) (2/2) | Mariya Lasitskene (ANA) (2/5) | Katerina Stefanidi (GRE) (2/4) | Gong Lijiao (CHN) (1/3) | Sandra Perković (CRO) (6/6) | Barbora Špotáková (CZE) (5/5) |
| 2018 | Caterine Ibargüen (COL) | Caterine Ibargüen (COL) (5/5) | Mariya Lasitskene (ANA) (3/5) | Katerina Stefanidi (GRE) (3/4) | Gong Lijiao (CHN) (2/3) | Yaime Pérez (CUB) (1/2) | Tatsiana Khaladovich (BLR) |
| 2019 | Malaika Mihambo (GER) | Shanieka Ricketts (JAM) | Mariya Lasitskene (ANA) (4/5) | Katerina Stefanidi (GRE) (4/4) | Gong Lijiao (CHN) (3/3) | Yaime Pérez (CUB) (2/2) | Lu Huihui (CHN) |
| 2020 | —N/a | —N/a | —N/a | —N/a | —N/a | —N/a | —N/a |
| 2021 | Ivana Španović (SRB) (3/5) | Yulimar Rojas (VEN) (1/3) | Mariya Lasitskene (ANA) (5/5) | Anzhelika Sidorova (ANA) | Magdalyn Ewen (USA) | Valarie Allman (USA) (1/5) | Christin Hussong (GER) |
| 2022 | Ivana Vuleta (SRB) (4/5) | Yulimar Rojas (VEN) (2/3) | Yaroslava Mahuchikh (UKR) (1/3) | Nina Kennedy (AUS) (1/2) | Chase Ealey (USA) (1/3) | Valarie Allman (USA) (2/5) | Kara Winger (USA) |
| 2023 | Ivana Vuleta (SRB) (5/5) | Yulimar Rojas (VEN) (3/3) | Yaroslava Mahuchikh (UKR) (2/3) | Katie Moon (USA) (1/2) | Chase Ealey (USA) (2/3) | Valarie Allman (USA) (3/5) | Haruka Kitaguchi (JPN) (1/2) |
| 2024 | Larissa Iapichino (ITA) (1/2) | Leyanis Pérez (CUB) (1/2) | Yaroslava Mahuchikh (UKR) (3/3) | Nina Kennedy (AUS) (2/2) | Sarah Mitton (CAN) | Valarie Allman (USA) (4/5) | Haruka Kitaguchi (JPN) (2/2) |
| 2025 | Larissa Iapichino (ITA) (2/2) | Leyanis Pérez (CUB) (2/2) | Nicola Olyslagers (AUS) | Katie Moon (USA) (2/2) | Jessica Schilder (NED) | Valarie Allman (USA) (5/5) | Elina Tzengko (GRE) |
| 2026 | Monae' Nichols (USA) | Saly Sarr (SEN) | Eleanor Patterson (AUS) | Hana Moll (USA) | Chase Jackson (USA) (3/3) | Feng Bin (CHN) | Yan Ziyi (CHN) |

== Notes ==
^{a} Athing Mu won the final as a national wild card so she was ineligible to win the Diamond League title, which went to runner-up Keely Hodgkinson

== Statistics ==
=== Legend ===
| Symbol/Column | Description |
|---|---|
| | Best nation |
| | Second best nation |
| | Third best nation |

=== Countries by number of event winners ===
| Rank | Country | 2010 | 2011 | 2012 | 2013 | 2014 | 2015 | 2016 | 2017 | 2018 | 2019 | 2021 | 2022 | 2023 | 2024 | 2025 | 2026 | Total Individual | Diamond League Record |
|---|---|---|---|---|---|---|---|---|---|---|---|---|---|---|---|---|---|---|---|
| 1 | United States | 11 | 7 | 6 | 6 | 9 | 9 | 6 | 5 | 5 | 8 | 8 | 7 | 6 | 3 | 8 | 7 | 115 | 7 |
| 2 | Kenya | 7 | 5 | 6 | 3 | 5 | 4 | 3 | 4 | 5 | 2 | 5 | 5 | 3 | 6 | 3 | 2 | 68 | 4 |
| 3 | Jamaica | 1 | 2 | 4 | 3 | 3 | 1 | 3 | 1 | 1 | 2 | 1 | 2 | 3 | 2 | 1 | 4 | 34 | 5 |
| 4 | Ethiopia | 1 | 1 | 2 | 3 | 1 | 2 | 2 | – | 1 | 1 | 1 | 1 | 1 | 1 | 1 | 2 | 21 | 2 |
| 5 | Germany | – | 3 | 1 | 2 | 1 | 1 | – | – | 1 | 1 | 2 | – | – | – | 2 | – | 14 | 2 |
| 5 | Great Britain | – | 3 | 1 | 1 | – | 1 | 1 | 2 | 1 | 1 | 1 | – | 1 | 1 | – | – | 14 | – |
| 7 | Czech Republic | 1 | – | 2 | 2 | 1 | 2 | 1 | 2 | – | – | – | – | 1 | – | – | – | 12 | – |
| 8 | Australia | – | 1 | – | – | – | – | 1 | 1 | 1 | – | – | 1 | 1 | 2 | 1 | 2 | 11 | – |
| 8 | France | 2 | 1 | 1 | 1 | 2 | 1 | 1 | – | – | – | – | – | – | 1 | 1 | – | 11 | – |
| 8 | Netherlands | – | – | – | – | – | 1 | 1 | – | – | 2 | 1 | 1 | 1 | 1 | 3 | – | 11 | 1 |
| 11 | Cuba | 2 | 2 | – | – | – | – | – | – | 1 | 2 | – | 1 | – | 1 | 1 | – | 10 | 1 |
| 12 | Italy | – | – | – | – | – | – | – | – | – | – | 1 | 1 | 1 | 3 | 2 | 1 | 9 | – |
| 12 | New Zealand | – | 1 | 1 | 1 | 1 | – | 2 | – | 1 | 1 | – | – | – | – | 1 | – | 9 | 1 |
| 12 | Sweden | – | – | – | 1 | – | – | – | – | – | 1 | 3 | 1 | 1 | 1 | 1 | – | 9 | 1 |
| 15 | Botswana | – | 1 | 1 | 1 | 1 | 1 | – | 2 | – | – | – | – | – | – | – | 1 | 8 | – |
| 15 | Croatia | 1 | 1 | 1 | 1 | 1 | 1 | 1 | 1 | – | – | – | – | – | – | – | – | 8 | 1 |
| 15 | Greece | – | – | – | – | – | 1 | 1 | 1 | 1 | 1 | – | 1 | – | – | 1 | 1 | 8 | – |
| 18 | Bahrain | – | – | – | – | – | – | 1 | 1 | 1 | 1 | – | – | 1 | – | 1 | 1 | 7 | – |
| 18 | Norway | 1 | – | – | – | – | – | – | – | – | 1 | 1 | 1 | 2 | 1 | 1 | – | 7 | – |
| 20 | China | – | – | – | – | – | – | – | 1 | 1 | 2 | – | – | – | – | – | 2 | 6 | – |
| 20 | Colombia | – | – | – | 1 | 1 | 1 | 1 | – | 2 | – | – | – | – | – | – | – | 6 | – |
| 20 | Poland | 1 | – | – | – | 1 | 1 | 1 | – | – | – | – | – | – | – | – | 2 | 6 | – |
| 20 | Russia | 1 | – | 2 | 2 | 1 | – | – | – | – | – | – | – | – | – | – | – | 6 | – |
| 20 | South Africa | – | – | – | – | 1 | – | 1 | 2 | 2 | – | – | – | – | – | – | – | 6 | 1 |
| 20 | Ukraine | – | 1 | – | 1 | – | – | – | – | – | 1 | – | 1 | 1 | 1 | – | – | 6 | 1 |
| 26 | Brazil | 1 | – | – | – | 1 | – | – | – | – | – | – | 1 | – | 1 | – | 1 | 5 | – |
| 26 | Grenada | – | 1 | – | – | – | 1 | – | – | – | – | – | 1 | 1 | 1 | – | – | 5 | – |
| 26 | Serbia | – | – | – | – | – | – | 1 | 1 | – | – | 1 | 1 | 1 | – | – | – | 5 | – |
| 29 | Bahamas | – | – | – | – | – | – | – | 2 | 1 | 1 | – | – | – | – | – | – | 4 | – |
| 29 | Canada | 1 | 1 | – | – | – | – | – | – | – | – | – | – | 1 | 1 | – | – | 4 | – |
| 29 | Dominican Republic | – | – | – | – | – | – | – | – | – | – | – | 1 | 1 | 1 | – | 1 | 4 | – |
| 29 | Spain | – | – | – | – | – | 1 | 2 | – | – | 1 | – | – | – | – | – | – | 4 | – |
| 29 | Panama | – | – | – | – | 1 | 1 | 1 | – | – | – | – | 1 | – | – | – | – | 4 | – |
| 29 | Switzerland | – | – | – | – | – | – | – | – | – | – | – | – | 1 | – | 2 | 1 | 4 | – |
| 35 | Estonia | – | – | 1 | 1 | – | – | – | – | – | 1 | – | – | – | – | – | – | 3 | – |
| 35 | Lithuania | – | 1 | – | – | – | – | – | 1 | – | – | – | – | – | – | 1 | – | 3 | – |
| 35 | Nigeria | – | – | – | – | – | – | – | – | – | – | 1 | 1 | 1 | – | – | – | 3 | – |
| 35 | Portugal | – | – | – | – | – | – | – | – | 1 | – | 1 | – | – | 1 | – | – | 3 | – |
| 35 | Puerto Rico | – | – | 1 | 1 | – | – | – | – | – | – | – | – | – | 1 | – | – | 3 | – |
| 35 | Qatar | – | – | – | – | 1 | 1 | – | 1 | – | – | – | – | – | – | – | – | 3 | 1 |
| 35 | Saint Lucia | – | – | – | – | – | – | – | – | – | – | – | – | – | 1 | 1 | 1 | 3 | – |
| 35 | Venezuela | – | – | – | – | – | – | – | – | – | – | 1 | 1 | 1 | – | – | – | 3 | 1 |
| 43 | Belarus | 1 | – | – | – | – | – | – | – | 1 | – | – | – | – | – | – | – | 2 | – |
| 43 | British Virgin Islands | – | – | – | – | – | – | – | 1 | 1 | – | – | – | – | – | – | – | 2 | – |
| 43 | Kazakhstan | – | – | 1 | – | – | – | – | 1 | – | – | – | – | – | – | – | – | 2 | – |
| 43 | Japan | – | – | – | – | – | – | – | – | – | – | – | – | 1 | 1 | – | – | 2 | – |
| 43 | Slovenia | – | – | – | – | – | – | – | – | – | – | – | 1 | – | – | – | 1 | 2 | 1 |
| 48 | Belgium | – | – | 1 | – | – | – | – | – | – | – | – | – | – | – | – | – | 1 | – |
| 48 | Burundi | – | – | – | – | – | – | – | – | – | – | 1 | – | – | – | – | – | 1 | – |
| 48 | Djibouti | – | – | – | 1 | – | – | – | – | – | – | – | – | – | – | – | – | 1 | – |
| 48 | Finland | – | – | – | – | – | 1 | – | – | – | – | – | – | – | – | – | – | 1 | – |
| 48 | India | – | – | – | – | – | – | – | – | – | – | – | 1 | – | – | – | – | 1 | – |
| 48 | Ivory Coast | – | – | – | – | – | – | – | – | 1 | – | – | – | – | – | – | – | 1 | – |
| 48 | Latvia | – | – | – | – | – | – | 1 | – | – | – | – | – | – | – | – | – | 1 | – |
| 48 | Morocco | – | – | – | – | – | – | – | – | – | – | – | 1 | – | – | – | – | 1 | – |
| 48 | Namibia | – | – | – | – | – | – | – | – | – | – | 1 | – | – | – | – | – | 1 | – |
| 48 | Senegal | – | – | – | – | – | – | – | – | – | – | – | – | – | – | – | 1 | 1 | |
| 48 | South Korea | – | – | – | – | – | – | – | – | – | – | – | – | 1 | – | – | – | 1 | – |
| 48 | Sri Lanka | – | – | – | – | – | – | – | – | – | – | – | – | – | – | – | 1 | 1 | – |
| 48 | Uganda | – | – | – | – | – | – | – | – | – | 1 | – | – | – | – | – | – | 1 | 1 |
| NR | Authorised Neutral Athletes | – | – | – | – | – | – | – | 2 | 3 | 1 | 2 | – | – | – | – | – | 8 | 1 |

=== Most titles by athlete ===
| Rank | Country | Name | Total titles | Events | Last |
|---|---|---|---|---|---|
| 1 | United States | Christian Taylor | 7 | Triple jump | 2019 |
| 1 | France | Renaud Lavillenie | 7 | Pole vault | 2016 |
3
| 3 | United States | Noah Lyles | 6 | 100 m(1) / 200 m(5) | 2025 |
| 3 | Colombia | Caterine Ibargüen | 6 | Triple jump / Long jump | 2018 |
| 3 | Croatia | Sandra Perković | 6 | Discus throw | 2017 |
| 3 | New Zealand | Valerie Adams | 6 | Shot put | 2016 |
7
| 7 | Sweden | Armand Duplantis | 5 | Pole vault | 2025 |
| 7 | Netherlands | Femke Bol | 5 | 400 m hurdles | 2025 |
| 7 | United States | Valarie Allman | 5 | Discus throw | 2025 |
| 7 | Kenya | Faith Kipyegon | 5 | 1500 m | 2024 |
| 7 | Serbia | Ivana Vuleta | 5 | Long jump | 2023 |
| 7 | Jamaica | Shelly-Ann Fraser-Pryce | 5 | 100 m / 200 m | 2022 |
| 7 | Authorised Neutral Athletes | Mariya Lasitskene | 5 | High jump | 2021 |
| 7 | Czech Republic | Barbora Špotáková | 5 | Javelin throw | 2017 |
14
| 14 | Dominican Republic | Marileidy Paulino | 4 | 400 m | 2026 |
| 14 | Kenya | Emmanuel Wanyonyi | 4 | 800 m | 2026 |
| 14 | Cuba; Italy | Andy Díaz Hernández | 4 | Triple jump | 2026 |
| 14 | United States | Joe Kovacs | 4 | Shot put | 2025 |
| 14 | Norway | Jakob Ingebrigtsen | 4 | 1500 m / 5000 m | 2024 |
| 14 | Grenada | Kirani James | 4 | 400 m | 2023 |
| 14 | Kenya | Timothy Cheruiyot | 4 | 1500 m | 2021 |
| 14 | Kenya | Conseslus Kipruto | 4 | 3000 m steeplechase | 2019 |
| 14 | Greece | Katerina Stefanidi | 4 | Pole vault | 2019 |
| 14 | Bahamas | Shaunae Miller-Uibo | 4 | 200 m / 400 m | 2019 |
| 14 | Poland | Piotr Małachowski | 4 | Discus throw | 2016 |
| 14 | United States | Dawn Harper-Nelson | 4 | 100 m hurdles | 2015 |
| 14 | United States | Allyson Felix | 4 | 200 m / 400 m | 2015 |
| 14 | Jamaica | Kaliese Spencer | 4 | 400 m hurdles | 2014 |
| 14 | Kenya | Milcah Cheywa | 4 | 3000 m steeplechase | 2013 |
30
| 30 | Saint Lucia | Julien Alfred | 3 | 100 m / 200 m | 2026 |
| 30 | United States | Kenneth Bednarek | 3 | 200 m | 2026 |
| 30 | Brazil | Alison dos Santos | 3 | 400 m hurdles | 2026 |
| 30 | Kenya | Faith Cherotich | 3 | 3000 m steeplechase | 2026 |
| 30 | United States | Chase Jackson | 3 | Shot put | 2026 |
| 30 | Norway | Karsten Warholm | 3 | 400 m hurdles | 2025 |
| 30 | United States | Christian Coleman | 3 | 100 m | 2025 |
| 30 | Bahrain | Salwa Eid Naser | 3 | 400 m | 2025 |
| 30 | Portugal | Pedro Pichardo | 3 | Triple jump | 2024 |
| 30 | Italy | Gianmarco Tamberi | 3 | High jump | 2024 |
| 30 | Ukraine | Yaroslava Mahuchikh | 3 | High jump | 2024 |
| 30 | Czech Republic | Jakub Vadlejch | 3 | Javelin throw | 2023 |
| 30 | Jamaica | Shericka Jackson | 3 | 100 m / 200 m | 2023 |
| 30 | Nigeria | Tobi Amusan | 3 | 100 m hurdles | 2023 |
| 30 | Venezuela | Yulimar Rojas | 3 | Triple jump | 2023 |
| 30 | Kenya | Emmanuel Korir | 3 | 800 m | 2022 |
| 30 | Jamaica | Elaine Thompson-Herah | 3 | 100 m | 2021 |
| 30 | New Zealand | Tomas Walsh | 3 | Shot put | 2019 |
| 30 | Netherlands | Sifan Hassan | 3 | 1500 m / 5000 m | 2019 |
| 30 | China | Lijiao Gong | 3 | Shot put | 2019 |
| 30 | South Africa | Caster Semenya | 3 | 800 m | 2018 |
| 30 | Botswana | Nijel Amos | 3 | 800 m | 2017 |
| 30 | Kenya | Conselus Kipruto | 3 | 3000 m steeplechase | 2017 |
| 30 | Qatar | Mutaz Essa Barshim | 3 | High jump | 2017 |
| 30 | Kenya | Asbel Kiprop | 3 | 1500 m | 2016 |
| 30 | Panama | Alonso Edward | 3 | 200 m | 2016 |
| 30 | United States | LaShawn Merritt | 3 | 400 m | 2016 |
| 30 | United States | David Oliver | 3 | 110 m hurdles | 2015 |
| 30 | United States | Justin Gatlin | 3 | 100 m | 2015 |
| 30 | Kenya | Eunice Jepkoech Sum | 3 | 800 m | 2015 |
| 30 | Botswana | Amantle Montsho | 3 | 400 m | 2013 |
| 30 | Germany | Silke Spiegelburg | 3 | Pole vault | 2013 |
| 30 | Kenya | Paul Kipsiele Koech | 3 | 3000 m steeplechase | 2012 |
| 30 | Kenya | Vivian Cheruiyot | 3 | 5000 m | 2012 |
| 30 | United States | Carmelita Jeter | 3 | 100 m / 200 m | 2011 |
66
| 66 | Switzerland | Audrey Werro | 2 | 800 m | 2026 |
| 66 | Jamaica | Tajay Gayle | 2 | Long jump | 2026 |
| 66 | Slovenia | Kristjan Čeh | 2 | Discus throw | 2026 |
| 66 | Germany | Julian Weber | 2 | Javelin throw | 2025 |
| 66 | Switzerland | Simon Ehammer | 2 | Long jump | 2025 |
| 66 | United States | Brittany Brown | 2 | 200 m | 2025 |
| 66 | Cuba | Leyanis Pérez | 2 | Triple jump | 2025 |
| 66 | Italy | Larissa Iapichino | 2 | Long jump | 2025 |
| 66 | United States | Katie Moon | 2 | Pole vault | 2025 |
| 66 | Ethiopia | Berihu Aregawi | 2 | 5000 m | 2024 |
| 66 | Australia | Matthew Denny | 2 | Discus throw | 2024 |
| 66 | Kenya | Mary Moraa | 2 | 800 m | 2024 |
| 66 | Kenya | Beatrice Chebet | 2 | 5000 m | 2024 |
| 66 | Australia | Nina Kennedy | 2 | Pole vault | 2024 |
| 66 | Japan | Haruka Kitaguchi | 2 | Javelin throw | 2024 |
| 66 | Great Britain | Keely Hodgkinson | 2 | 800 m | 2023 |
| 66 | United States | Fred Kerley | 2 | 100 m / 400 m | 2021 |
| 66 | Sweden | Daniel Ståhl | 2 | Discus throw | 2021 |
| 66 | Spain | Orlando Ortega | 2 | 110 m hurdles | 2019 |
| 66 | United States | Sam Kendricks | 2 | Pole vault | 2019 |
| 66 | Kenya | Beatrice Chepkoech | 2 | 3000 m steeplechase | 2019 |
| 66 | Cuba | Yaime Pérez | 2 | Discus throw | 2019 |
| 66 | Authorised Neutral Athletes | Sergey Shubenkov | 2 | 110 m hurdles | 2018 |
| 66 | British Virgin Islands | Kyron McMaster | 2 | 400 m hurdles | 2018 |
| 66 | South Africa | Luvo Manyonga | 2 | Long jump | 2018 |
| 66 | United States | Dalilah Muhammad | 2 | 400 m hurdles | 2018 |
| 66 | Kenya | Hellen Obiri | 2 | 5000 m | 2018 |
| 66 | Great Britain | Laura Muir | 2 | 1500 m | 2018 |
| 66 | Bahrain | Ruth Jebet | 2 | 3000 m steeplechase | 2017 |
| 66 | Kazakhstan | Olga Rypakova | 2 | Triple jump | 2017 |
| 66 | Jamaica | Asafa Powell | 2 | 100 m | 2016 |
| 66 | Spain | Ruth Beitia | 2 | High jump | 2016 |
| 66 | United States | Bershawn Jackson | 2 | 400 m hurdles | 2015 |
| 66 | Kenya | Jairus Kipchoge Birech | 2 | 3000 m steeplechase | 2015 |
| 66 | Czech Republic | Zuzana Hejnová | 2 | 400 m hurdles | 2015 |
| 66 | United States | Tianna Bartoletta | 2 | Long jump | 2015 |
| 66 | Kenya | Silas Kiplagat | 2 | 1500 m | 2014 |
| 66 | United States | Reese Hoffa | 2 | Shot put | 2014 |
| 66 | Brazil | Fabiana Murer | 2 | Pole vault | 2014 |
| 66 | Ethiopia | Mohammed Aman | 2 | 800 m | 2013 |
| 66 | Puerto Rico | Javier Culson | 2 | 400 m hurdles | 2013 |
| 66 | Russia | Aleksandr Menkov | 2 | Long jump | 2013 |
| 66 | Estonia | Gerd Kanter | 2 | Discus throw | 2013 |
| 66 | Czech Republic | Vítězslav Veselý | 2 | Javelin throw | 2013 |
| 66 | Sweden; Ethiopia | Abeba Aregawi | 2 | 1500 m | 2013 |
| 66 | Germany | Christina Obergföll | 2 | Javelin throw | 2013 |
| 66 | Kenya | David Rudisha | 2 | 800 m | 2011 |
| 66 | Ethiopia | Imane Merga | 2 | 5000 m | 2011 |
| 66 | United States | Brittney Reese | 2 | Long jump | 2011 |
| 66 | Croatia | Blanka Vlašić | 2 | High jump | 2011 |
| 66 | Cuba | Yarelys Barrios | 2 | Discus throw | 2011 |

=== Multi event title winners ===
| Country | Name | Events | Type | Year |
|---|---|---|---|---|
| United States | Allyson Felix | 2 | 200 m 400 m | 2010, 2014, 2015; 2010 |
| United States | Carmelita Jeter | 2 | 100 m 200 m | 2010, 2011; 2011 |
| Jamaica | Shelly-Ann Fraser-Pryce | 2 | 100 m 200 m | 2012, 2013, 2015, 2022; 2013 |
| Bahamas | Shaunae Miller-Uibo | 2 | 200 m 400 m | 2017, 2018, 2019; 2017 |
| Colombia | Caterine Ibargüen | 2 | triple jump long jump | 2013–2016, 2018; 2018 |
| Netherlands | Sifan Hassan | 2 | 1500 m 5000 m | 2015, 2019; 2019 |
| United States | Noah Lyles | 2 | 200 m 100 m | 2017, 2018, 2019, 2022; 2019 |
| United States | Fred Kerley | 2 | 400 m 100 m | 2018; 2021 |
| Norway | Jakob Ingebrigtsen | 2 | 1500 m 5000 m | 2022, 2023, 2024; 2023 |
| Jamaica | Shericka Jackson | 2 | 200 m 100 m | 2022, 2023; 2023 |
| Saint Lucia | Julien Alfred | 2 | 100 m 200 m | 2024, 2025; 2026 |

=== Perfect Diamond Races ===
| Year | Athlete | Country | Event | Wins |
|---|---|---|---|---|
| 2010 | Blanka Vlašić | Croatia | High jump | 7 |
| 2010 | Valerie Vili | New Zealand | Shot put | 7 |
| 2013 | Sandra Perković | Croatia | Discus throw | 7 |
| 2013 | Zuzana Hejnová | Czech Republic | 400 metres hurdles | 7 |
| 2014 | Valerie Adams | New Zealand | Shot put | 7 |
| 2016 | Sandra Perković | Croatia | Discus throw | 7 |
| 2017 | Mariya Lasitskene | Authorised Neutral Athletes | High jump | 7 |
| 2018 | Caterine Ibargüen | Colombia | Triple jump | 5 |
| 2021 | Daniel Ståhl | Sweden | Discus throw | 4 |
| 2022 | Kristjan Ceh | Slovenia | Discus throw | 5 |
| 2022 | Chase Ealey | United States | Shot put | 5 |
| 2025 | Valarie Allman | United States | Discus throw | 5 |

== Diamond League records ==
=== Men ===
| Event | Record | Athlete | Nationality | Date | Meet | Place | Ref. |
|---|---|---|---|---|---|---|---|
| 100 m | 9.69 (−0.1 m/s) | Yohan Blake | Jamaica | 23 August 2012 | Athletissima | Lausanne, Switzerland | |
| 200 m | 19.26 (+0.7 m/s) | Yohan Blake | Jamaica | 16 September 2011 | Memorial Van Damme | Brussels, Belgium | |
| 300 m | 31.63 | Wayde van Niekerk | South Africa | 7 June 2015 | Birmingham Grand Prix | Birmingham, United Kingdom | |
| 400 m | 43.40 NR | Collen Kebinatshipi | Botswana | 4 September 2026 | Memorial Van Damme | Brussels, Belgium | |
| 600 m | 1:13.10 | David Rudisha | Kenya | 5 June 2016 | British Grand Prix | Birmingham, United Kingdom | |
| 800 m | 1:41.11 | Emmanuel Wanyonyi | Kenya | 22 August 2024 | Athletissima | Lausanne, Switzerland | |
| 1000 m | 2:11.83 WR | Emmanuel Wanyonyi | Kenya | 10 July 2026 | Herculis | Fontvieille, Monaco | |
| 1500 m | 3:26.69 | Asbel Kiprop | Kenya | 17 July 2015 | Herculis | Fontvieille, Monaco | |
| Mile | 3:42.66 WR | Josh Kerr | Great Britain | 18 July 2026 | London Athletics Meet | London, United Kingdom | |
| 2000 m | 4:43.13 WR | Jakob Ingebrigtsen | Norway | 8 September 2023 | Memorial Van Damme | Brussels, Belgium | |
| 3000 m | 7:17.55 WR | Jakob Ingebrigtsen | Norway | 25 August 2024 | Kamila Skolimowska Memorial | Chorzów, Poland | |
| Two miles | 7:54.10 WB | Jakob Ingebrigtsen | Norway | 9 June 2023 | Meeting de Paris | Paris, France | |
| 5000 m | 12:35.36 WR | Joshua Cheptegei | Uganda | 14 August 2020 | Herculis | Fontvieille, Monaco | |
| 10,000 m | 26:43.16 | Kenenisa Bekele | Ethiopia | 16 September 2011 | Memorial Van Damme | Brussels, Belgium | |
| 20,000 m | 56:20.02+ WR | Bashir Abdi | Belgium | 4 September 2020 | Memorial Van Damme | Brussels, Belgium | |
| One hour | 21,330 m WR | Mo Farah | Great Britain | 4 September 2020 | Memorial Van Damme | Brussels, Belgium | |
| 110 m hurdles | 12.80 (+0.3 m/s) | Aries Merritt | United States | 7 September 2012 | Memorial Van Damme | Brussels, Belgium | |
| 300 m hurdles | 32.67 | Karsten Warholm | Norway | 12 June 2025 | Bislett Games | Oslo, Norway | |
| 400 m hurdles | 45.80 WR | Alison dos Santos | Brazil | 27 August 2026 | Weltklasse Zürich | Zürich, Switzerland | |
| 3000 m steeplechase | 7:52.11 WR | Lamecha Girma | Ethiopia | 9 June 2023 | Meeting de Paris | Paris, France | |
| High jump | 2.43 m AR | Mutaz Essa Barshim | Qatar | 5 September 2014 | Memorial Van Damme | Brussels, Belgium | |
| Pole vault | 6.28 m | Armand Duplantis | Sweden | 15 June 2025 | Bauhausgalan | Stockholm, Sweden | |
| Long jump | 8.65 m (−0.5 m/s) | Juan Miguel Echevarría | Cuba | 29 August 2019 | Weltklasse Zürich | Zürich, Switzerland | |
| Triple jump | 18.11 m (+0.8 m/s) | Christian Taylor | United States | 27 May 2017 | Prefontaine Classic | Eugene, United States | |
| Shot put | 23.23 m | Joe Kovacs | United States | 7 September 2022 | Weltklasse Zürich | Zürich, Switzerland | |
| Discus throw | 72.58 m | Mykolas Alekna | Lithuania | 23 August 2026 | Kamila Skolimowska Memorial | Chorzów, Poland | |
| Hammer throw | 83.33 m | Ethan Katzberg | Canada | 3 July 2026 | Prefontaine Classic | Eugene, United States | |
| Javelin throw | 93.90 m | Thomas Röhler | Germany | 5 May 2017 | Doha Diamond League | Doha, Qatar | |
| 4 × 100 m relay | 37.45 | Mike Rodgers; Tyson Gay; Wallace Spearmon; Trell Kimmons | United States | 19 August 2010 | Weltklasse Zürich | Zürich, Switzerland | |
| 4 × 400 m relay | 3:01.46 | Patrik Simon Enyingi; Zoltán Wahl; Csanad Csahóczi; Attila Molnár | Hungary | 15 August 2025 | Kamila Skolimowska Memorial | Chorzów, Poland | |

=== Women ===
| Event | Record | Athlete | Nationality | Date | Meet | Place | Ref. |
|---|---|---|---|---|---|---|---|
| 100 m | 10.54 (+0.9 m/s) NR | Elaine Thompson-Herah | Jamaica | 21 August 2021 | Prefontaine Classic | Eugene, United States | |
| 200 m | 21.48 (+0.2 m/s) | Shericka Jackson | Jamaica | 8 September 2023 | Memorial Van Damme | Brussels, Belgium | |
| 300 m | 35.76 | Lurdes Gloria Manuel | Czech Republic | 23 August 2026 | Kamila Skolimowska Memorial | Chorzów, Poland | |
| 400 m | 48.48 | Marileidy Paulino | Dominican Republic | 28 June 2026 | Meeting de Paris | Paris, France | |
| 800 m | 1:53.70 NR | Audrey Werro | Switzerland | 27 August 2026 | Weltklasse Zürich | Zürich, Switzerland | |
| 1000 m | 2:29.15 AR | Faith Kipyegon | Kenya | 14 August 2020 | Herculis | Fontvieille, Monaco | |
| 1500 m | 3:48.68 WR | Faith Kipyegon | Kenya | 5 July 2025 | Prefontaine Classic | Eugene, United States | |
| Mile | 4:07.64 WR | Faith Kipyegon | Kenya | 21 July 2023 | Herculis | Fontvieille, Monaco | |
| 2000 m | 5:19.70 WR | Jessica Hull | Australia | 12 July 2024 | Herculis | Fontvieille, Monaco | |
| 3000 m | 8:07.04 AR | Faith Kipyegon | Kenya | 16 August 2025 | Kamila Skolimowska Memorial | Chorzów, Poland | |
| Two miles | 8:59.08 NR | Francine Niyonsaba | Burundi | 27 May 2022 | Prefontaine Classic | Eugene, United States | |
| 5000 m | 13:58.06 WR | Beatrice Chebet | Kenya | 5 July 2025 | Prefontaine Classic | Eugene, United States | |
| 10,000 m | 28:54.14 WR | Beatrice Chebet | Kenya | 25 May 2024 | Prefontaine Classic | Eugene, United States | |
| One hour | 18,930 m WR | Sifan Hassan | Netherlands | 4 September 2020 | Memorial Van Damme | Brussels, Belgium | |
| 100 m hurdles | 12.09 (±0.0 m/s) WR | Masai Russell | United States | 27 August 2026 | Weltklasse Zürich | Zürich, Switzerland | |
| 400 m hurdles | 51.30 | Femke Bol | Netherlands | 20 July 2024 | London Athletics Meet | London, United Kingdom | |
| 3000 m steeplechase | 8:44.32 WR | Beatrice Chepkoech | Kenya | 20 July 2018 | Herculis | Fontvieille, Monaco | |
| High jump | 2.10 m WR | Yaroslava Mahuchikh | Ukraine | 7 July 2024 | Meeting de Paris | Paris, France | |
| Pole vault | 5.01 m | Anzhelika Sidorova | Russia | 9 September 2021 | Weltklasse Zürich | Zürich, Switzerland | |
| Long jump | 7.25 m (+1.6 m/s) | Brittney Reese | United States | 10 May 2013 | Doha Diamond League | Doha, Qatar | |
| Triple jump | 15.52 m (+0.6 m/s) | Yulimar Rojas | Venezuela | 26 August 2021 | Athletissima | Lausanne, Switzerland | |
| Shot put | 21.14 m AR | Chase Jackson | United States | 4 September 2026 | Memorial Van Damme | Brussels, Belgium | |
| Discus throw | 71.72 m | Cierra Jackson | United States | 18 July 2026 | London Athletics Meet | London, United Kingdom | |
| Hammer throw | 78.88 m | Camryn Rogers | Canada | 5 July 2025 | Prefontaine Classic | Eugene, United States | |
| Javelin throw | 71.74 m WU20R, AR | Yan Ziyi | China | 23 May 2026 | Xiamen Diamond League | Xiamen, China | |
| 4 × 100 m relay | 41.55 | Dina Asher-Smith; Imani-Lara Lansiquot; Amy Hunt; Daryll Neita | Great Britain | 20 July 2024 | London Athletics Meet | London, United Kingdom | |
| 4 × 400 m relay | 3:28.38 | Carys McAulay; Ama Pipi; Lina Nielsen; Nicole Kendall | Great Britain | 15 June 2023 | Bislett Games | Oslo, Norway | |

- WR: World Record – AR: Area Record – NR: National Record – OWB: Outdoor World Best
