= 2020 Diamond League =

- Edition: 11th
- Dates: 11 June – 17 October
- Events: 24
- Meetings: 8

The 2020 Diamond League was the eleventh season of the annual series of outdoor track and field meetings, organised by World Athletics. The competition marked the first major revision to the top level athletics series since its foundation in 2010. The number of Diamond Discipline events was reduced from 32 to 24, and the dual-meet final format was due to be replaced by a single final, which would have expanded the number of meetings to 15. A second Chinese meeting was added to the calendar. The reduction of events was aimed at allowing a standardised 90-minute television format for the series. Each meeting will host 11 or 12 Diamond Discipline events and some of these events will not be broadcast. Events losing Diamond Discipline status will feature on the World Athletics Continental Tour, which will replace the IAAF World Challenge as the second tier of track and field meetings.

Compared with the previous year, the Birmingham meeting moved venues to Gateshead due to stadium renovations, while the Prefontaine Classic was due to return to Eugene, Oregon following completion of its renovation. The Doha Diamond League will also return to the Qatar Sports Club, the home of the Qatari Diamond League between 2010 and 2018. The Golden Gala was originally due be held at the San Paolo Stadium in Naples instead of Rome, due to the renovation of the Olympic Stadium. Initial plans for the 2020 season were to remove the Stockholm Bauhaus Athletics from the series and condense the calendar into a much shorter time-frame, but these plans were abandoned after a five-year title sponsorship deal with Chinese conglomerate Wanda Group.

Due to then COVID-19 pandemic, the format was changed. The series will no longer be a structured series of events leading up to a final and athletes will not earn Diamond League points.

== Schedule ==
The following nine meetings are scheduled to be included in the 2020 season (note: schedule was revised due to the pandemic and meetings in London, Eugene, Paris, Rabat, Gateshead and Shanghai were cancelled):

Leg	Date	Meet	Stadium	City	Country	Events (M+W)
(1)	11 June	Oslo Bislett Games	Bislett Stadium	Oslo	Norway	4+0
(2)	9 July	Weltklasse Zürich	Letzigrund	Zürich	Switzerland	2+1
3	14 August	Herculis	Stade Louis II	Fontvieille	Monaco	8+6
4	23 August	Bauhausgalan	Stockholm Olympic Stadium	Stockholm	Sweden	8+8
5	2 September	Athletissima	Stade Olympique de la Pontaise	Lausanne	Switzerland	1+1
6	4 September	AG Memorial Van Damme	King Baudouin Stadium	Brussels	Belgium	4+4
7	17 September	Golden Gala - Pietro Mennea	Stadio Olimpico	Rome	Italy	8+6
8	25 September	Doha Diamond League	Qatar SC Stadium	Doha	Qatar	6+5

() = Event was modified to no-spectator multi-place interactive event.

=== Men ===
==== Track ====
#	Meeting	100 m	200 m	400 m	800 m	1500 m	5000 m	110 m h	400 m h	3000 m st
1	Oslo Bislett Games	Salum Ageze Kashafali (NOR); 10.59	-	-	-	-	-	-	-	-
2	Weltklasse Zürich	-	Christophe Lemaitre (FRA); 20.65	-	-	-	-	-	-	-
3	Herculis	-	Noah Lyles (USA); 19.76 - WL	-	Donavan Brazier (USA); 1.43.15	Timothy Cheruiyot (KEN); 3.28.45 -WL	Joshua Cheptegei (UGA); 12.35.36 -WR	Orlando Ortega (ESP); 13.11	Karsten Warholm (NOR); 47.10 - WL -MR	Soufiane El Bakkali (MAR); 8:08.04 - WL
4	Bauhausgalan	-	Adam Gemili (GBR); 20.61	Karsten Warholm (NOR); 45.05 - SB	Donavan Brazier (USA); 1.43.76	Timothy Cheruiyot (KEN); 3.30.25	-	-	Karsten Warholm (NOR); 46.87 - AR, WL, DLR, MR, PB	-
5	Stade Olympique de la Pontaise	-	-	-	-	-	-	-	-	-
6	AG Memorial Van Damme	-	Eseosa Desalu (ITA); 20.39 -	-	-	Jakob Ingebrigtsen (NOR); 3:30.69	-	-	Karsten Warholm (NOR); 47.07 MR	-
7	Golden Gala - Pietro Mennea	Akani Simbine (RSA); 9.96 -	-	Edoardo Scotti (ITA); 45.21	-	-	-	Andrew Pozzi (GBR); 13.15	Karsten Warholm (NOR); 47.07 MR	-
8	Doha Diamond League	-	Arthur Cissé (CIV); 20.23 NR, PB	Kahmari Montgomery (USA); 45.55	Ferguson Cheruiyot Rotich (KEN); 1:44.16 SB	Stewart McSweyn (AUS); 3:30.51 NR, PB	-	Aaron Mallett (USA); 13.15 PB	-	-

==== Field ====
#	Meeting	Long jump	Triple jump	High jump	Pole vault	Shot put	Discus	Javelin
1	Oslo Bislett Games	-	-	-	Armand Duplantis (SWE); 5.86	Marcus Thomsen (NOR); 21.03	Daniel Ståhl (SWE); 65.92	-
2	Weltklasse Zürich	-	Pedro Pablo Pichardo (POR); 17.40	-	Sam Kendricks (USA); 5.81	-	-	-
3	Herculis	-	-	-	Armand Duplantis (SWE); 6.00	-	-	-
4	Bauhausgalan	Rushwal Samaai (RSA); 8.09 - SB	-	-	Armand Duplantis (SWE); 6.01 -WL, MR	-	Daniel Ståhl (SWE); 69.17	-
5	Stade Olympique de la Pontaise	-	-	-	Armand Duplantis (SWE); 6.07 WL, DLR, MR	-	-	-
6	AG Memorial Van Damme	-	-	-	Armand Duplantis (SWE); 6.00 - MR	-	-	-
7	Golden Gala - Pietro Mennea	-	-	Andriy Protsenko (UKR); 2.30 m	Armand Duplantis (SWE); 6.15 - WL, DLR, NR, PB	Nick Ponzio (USA); 21.09	-	-
8	Doha Diamond League	-	-	-	Armand Duplantis (SWE); 5.82 =MR	-	-	-

=== Women ===
==== Track ====
#	Meeting	100 m	200 m	400 m	800 m	1500 m	5000 m	100 m h	400 m h	3000 m st
1	Oslo Bislett Games	-	-	-	-	-	-	-	-	-
2	Weltklasse Zürich	-	-	-	-	-	-	-	-	-
3	Herculis	Ajla Del Ponte (SUI); 11.16	-	Lynna Irby (USA); 50.50 - WL	-	-	Hellen Obiri (KEN); 14:22.12 - WL, MR	-	-	-
4	Bauhausgalan	Ajla Del Ponte (SUI); 11.20	-	Wadeline Jonathas (USA); 51.94	Jemma Reekie (GBR); 1:59.68	Laura Muir (GBR); 3:57.86 - WL	-	Luminosa Bogliolo (ITA); 12.88	Femke Bol (NED); 54.68	-
5	Stade Olympique de la Pontaise	-	-	-	-	-	-	-	-	-
6	AG Memorial Van Damme	Rani Rosius (BEL); 11.43	-	Iga Baumgart-Witan (POL); 52.13	-	-	-	Anne Zagre (BEL); 13.21	-	-
7	Golden Gala - Pietro Mennea	Elaine Thompson (JAM); 10.85 - WL	-	Lieke Klaver (NED); 50.98	Jemma Reekie (GBR); 1:59.76	-	-	Nadine Visser (NED); 12.72	Femke Bol (NED); 53.90	-
8	Doha Diamond League	Elaine Thompson (JAM); 10.87	-	-	Faith Kipyegon (KEN); 1:57.68 - WL, PB	-	Hellen Obiri (KEN); 8:22.54 - WL	Payton Chadwick (USA); 12.78 - SB	-	-

==== Field ====
#	Meeting	Long jump	Triple jump	High jump	Pole vault	Shot put	Discus	Javelin
1	Oslo Bislett Games	-	-	-	-	-	-	-
2	Weltklasse Zürich	-	-	-	Sandi Morris (USA); 4.66 - SB	-	-	-
3	Herculis	-	Yulimar Rojas (VEN); 14.27 - SB	Yaroslava Mahuchikh (UKR); 1.98	-	-	-	-
4	Bauhausgalan	-	-	Yaroslava Mahuchikh (UKR); 2.00 - WL	Holly Bradshaw (GBR); 4.69 - WL	-	-	-
5	Stade Olympique de la Pontaise	-	-	-	Angelica Bengtsson (SWE); 4.72	-	-	-
6	AG Memorial Van Damme	-	-	Nicola McDermott (AUS); 1.91	-	-	-	-
7	Golden Gala - Pietro Mennea	-	-	Yuliya Levchenko (UKR); 1.98	-	-	-	-
8	Doha Diamond League	Maryna Bekh-Romanchuk (UKR); 6.91 - SB	-	-	-	-	-	-
