= 2020 Doha Diamond League =

- Dates: 25 September 2020
- Host city: Doha, Qatar
- Venue: Qatar Sports Club Stadium
- Level: 2020 Diamond League
- Type: Outdoor
- Events: 15

The 2020 Doha Diamond League was the 22nd edition of the annual outdoor track and field meeting in Doha, Qatar. Held on 25 September at the Qatar Sports Club Stadium, it was the eighth and last leg of the 2020 Diamond League – the highest level international track and field circuit. Despite being the last meet in the series, no Diamond League champions were crowned due to the shortened season, and no points were awarded for event placements.

The meet was originally scheduled to be held at the Qatar Sports Club Stadium on April 17, except for the men's high jump, which would have been held at the Katara Cultural Village amphitheatre on April 16. However, on March 16, it was announced that the meet had been postponed due to the COVID-19 pandemic. In May, a new date of 9 October had been selected making it the twelfth leg of the 2020 Diamond League. In August it was rescheduled for the last time to 25 September, making it the eighth and last meet in the 2020 Diamond League after several other meets were cancelled.

== Results ==
Because of the shortened season, no Diamond League points were awarded for athlete placements, and no Diamond League champions were crowned.

In the women's long jump event, the "Final 3" format was used, resulting in a different order of the top-3 marks.

=== Men ===
Men's 200 Metres (+0.9 m/s)
Place	Athlete	Country	Time
1st place, gold medalist(s)	Arthur Cissé	Ivory Coast	20.23 NR
2nd place, silver medalist(s)	Julian Forte	Jamaica	20.39
3rd place, bronze medalist(s)	Christophe Lemaitre	France	20.68
4	Mario Burke	Barbados	20.72
5	Christopher Belcher	United States	20.86
6	Abdelaziz Mohamed	Qatar	20.88
7	Mike Rodgers	United States	21.19
8	Demek Kemp	United States	21.87

Men's 400 Metres
Place	Athlete	Country	Time
1st place, gold medalist(s)	Kahmari Montgomery	United States	45.55
2nd place, silver medalist(s)	Yousef Karam	Kuwait	45.72
3rd place, bronze medalist(s)	Mohamed Nasir Abbas	Qatar	45.96
4	Ludvy Vaillant	France	46.11
5	Rabah Yousif	Great Britain	46.46
6	Liemarvin Bonevacia	Netherlands	46.70
7	Kennedy Luchembe	Zambia	46.89
8	David Kendziera	United States	47.38

Men's 800 Metres
Place	Athlete	Country	Time
1st place, gold medalist(s)	Ferguson Rotich	Kenya	1:44.16
2nd place, silver medalist(s)	Elliot Giles	Great Britain	1:44.56 PB
3rd place, bronze medalist(s)	Wyclife Kinyamal	Kenya	1:45.68
4	Peter Bol	Australia	1:45.74
5	Bryce Hoppel	United States	1:45.86
6	Guy Learmonth	Great Britain	1:46.25
7	Wesley Vázquez	Puerto Rico	1:46.44
8	Timothy Cheruiyot	Kenya	1:46.78
9	Erik Sowinski	United States	1:46.81
10	Álvaro de Arriba	Spain	1:47.19
11	Jamal Hairane	Qatar	1:47.88
	Joseph Deng	Australia	DNF

Men's 1500 Metres
Place	Athlete	Country	Time
1st place, gold medalist(s)	Stewart McSweyn	Australia	3:30.51 NR
2nd place, silver medalist(s)	Selemon Barega	Ethiopia	3:32.97 PB
3rd place, bronze medalist(s)	Soufiane El Bakkali	Morocco	3:33.45 PB
4	Lamecha Girma	Ethiopia	3:33.77 PB
5	James West	Great Britain	3:34.07 PB
6	Ignacio Fontes	Spain	3:34.74
7	Jesús Gómez	Spain	3:35.31
8	Piers Copeland	Great Britain	3:35.32 PB
9	Musab Adam Ali	Qatar	3:35.60 PB
10	Bethwell Birgen	Kenya	3:36.67
11	Hamza Driouch	Qatar	3:37.15
12	Ryan Gregson	Australia	3:37.75
13	Vincent Kibet	Kenya	3:38.27
	Conseslus Kipruto	Kenya	DNF
	Brimin Kiprono Kiprotich	Kenya	DNF
	Mariano García	Spain	DNF
B Race
1st place, gold medalist(s)	Ilyass el Ouali	Morocco	3:43.66
2nd place, silver medalist(s)	Mohamad Al-Garni	Qatar	3:44.30
3rd place, bronze medalist(s)	Joseph Deng	Australia	3:47.39
4	Hamze Ali Hassan	Djibouti	3:48.97
	Yaser Bagharab	Qatar	DNS
	Aden Moussa Absieh	Djibouti	DNS
	Mohcine Zaytouni	Morocco	DNF
	Babker Abdo Koudi	Sudan	DNF

Men's 110 Metres Hurdles (+0.3 m/s)
Place	Athlete	Country	Time
1st place, gold medalist(s)	Aaron Mallett	United States	13.15 PB
2nd place, silver medalist(s)	Jason Joseph	Switzerland	13.40
3rd place, bronze medalist(s)	David King	Great Britain	13.54
4	Gabriel Constantino	Brazil	13.60
5	Cameron Fillery	Great Britain	13.76
	Freddie Crittenden	United States	DNS
	Paolo Dal Molin	Italy	DQ
	Wilhem Belocian	France	DQ

Men's Pole Vault
Place	Athlete	Country	Mark
1st place, gold medalist(s)	Armand Duplantis	Sweden	5.82 m =MR
2nd place, silver medalist(s)	Sam Kendricks	United States	5.82 m =MR
3rd place, bronze medalist(s)	Renaud Lavillenie	France	5.82 m =MR
4	Matt Ludwig	United States	5.71 m
5	Ben Broeders	Belgium	5.71 m
6	Cole Walsh	United States	5.61 m
7	Audie Wyatt	United States	5.46 m
8	Thibaut Collet	France	5.46 m
	Harry Coppell	Great Britain	NM

=== Women ===
Women's 100 Metres (±0.0 m/s)
Place	Athlete	Country	Time
1st place, gold medalist(s)	Elaine Thompson-Herah	Jamaica	10.87
2nd place, silver medalist(s)	Marie Josée Ta Lou-Smith	Ivory Coast	11.21
3rd place, bronze medalist(s)	Kayla White	United States	11.25
4	Kristal Awuah	Great Britain	11.27
5	Anthonique Strachan	Bahamas	11.42
6	Amy Hunt	Great Britain	11.43
7	Payton Chadwick	United States	11.51 PB
8	Cindy Sember	Great Britain	11.74

Women's 800 Metres
Place	Athlete	Country	Time
1st place, gold medalist(s)	Faith Kipyegon	Kenya	1:57.68 WL PB
2nd place, silver medalist(s)	Esther Guerrero	Spain	1:59.22 PB
3rd place, bronze medalist(s)	Adelle Tracey	Great Britain	1:59.87
4	Habitam Alemu	Ethiopia	2:00.11
5	Winnie Nanyondo	Uganda	2:00.49
6	Angelika Cichocka	Poland	2:01.06
7	Kaela Edwards	United States	2:01.49
8	Shelayna Oskan-Clarke	Great Britain	2:02.22
9	Eunice Sum	Kenya	2:02.42
	Emily Cherotich Tuei	Kenya	DNF

Women's 3000 Metres
Place	Athlete	Country	Time
1st place, gold medalist(s)	Hellen Obiri	Kenya	8:22.54 WL
2nd place, silver medalist(s)	Agnes Tirop	Kenya	8:22.92 PB
3rd place, bronze medalist(s)	Beatrice Chepkoech	Kenya	8:22.92 PB
4	Margaret Kipkemboi	Kenya	8:24.76 PB
5	Hyvin Jepkemoi	Kenya	8:25.13 PB
6	Gudaf Tsegay	Ethiopia	8:25.23 PB
7	Laura Weightman	Great Britain	8:26.31
8	Lemlem Hailu	Ethiopia	8:35.78
9	Jessica Hull	Australia	8:36.03 NR
10	Quailyne Jebiwott Kiprop	Kenya	8:39.88 PB
11	Eilish McColgan	Great Britain	8:40.88
12	Beatrice Chebet	Kenya	8:50.40
13	Melissa Courtney-Bryant	Great Britain	8:56.11
14	Genevieve Gregson	Australia	9:07.40
	Winny Chebet	Kenya	DNF
-	Tsehay Gemechu	Ethiopia	DQ

Women's 100 Metres Hurdles (+1.1 m/s)
Place	Athlete	Country	Time
1st place, gold medalist(s)	Payton Chadwick	United States	12.78
2nd place, silver medalist(s)	Taliyah Brooks	United States	12.86 PB
3rd place, bronze medalist(s)	Cindy Sember	Great Britain	13.02
4	Klaudia Wojtunik	Poland	13.21
5	Zoë Sedney	Netherlands	13.24 PB
6	Mette Graversgaard	Denmark	13.25
7	Anja Lukic	Serbia	13.48
8	Yanique Thompson	Jamaica	13.52

Women's Long Jump
Place	Athlete	Country	Mark
1st place, gold medalist(s)	Maryna Bekh-Romanchuk	Ukraine	6.91 m (+0.6 m/s)
2nd place, silver medalist(s)	Ese Brume	Nigeria	6.71 m (−0.2 m/s)
3rd place, bronze medalist(s)	Khaddi Sagnia	Sweden	6.85 m (+0.2 m/s)
4	Milica Gardašević	Serbia	6.46 m (+1.2 m/s)
5	Taliyah Brooks	United States	6.30 m (+0.2 m/s)
6	Eva Bastmeijer	Netherlands	6.17 m (+1.0 m/s)
7	Yarianny Argüelles	Portugal	5.74 m (+0.8 m/s)

== See also ==
- 2020 Golden Gala (previous meet in the 2020 Diamond League season)
