= 2022 Meeting de Paris =

27th edition of the annual Meeting de Paris

- Dates: 18 June 2022
- Host city: Paris, France
- Venue: Stade Sébastien Charléty
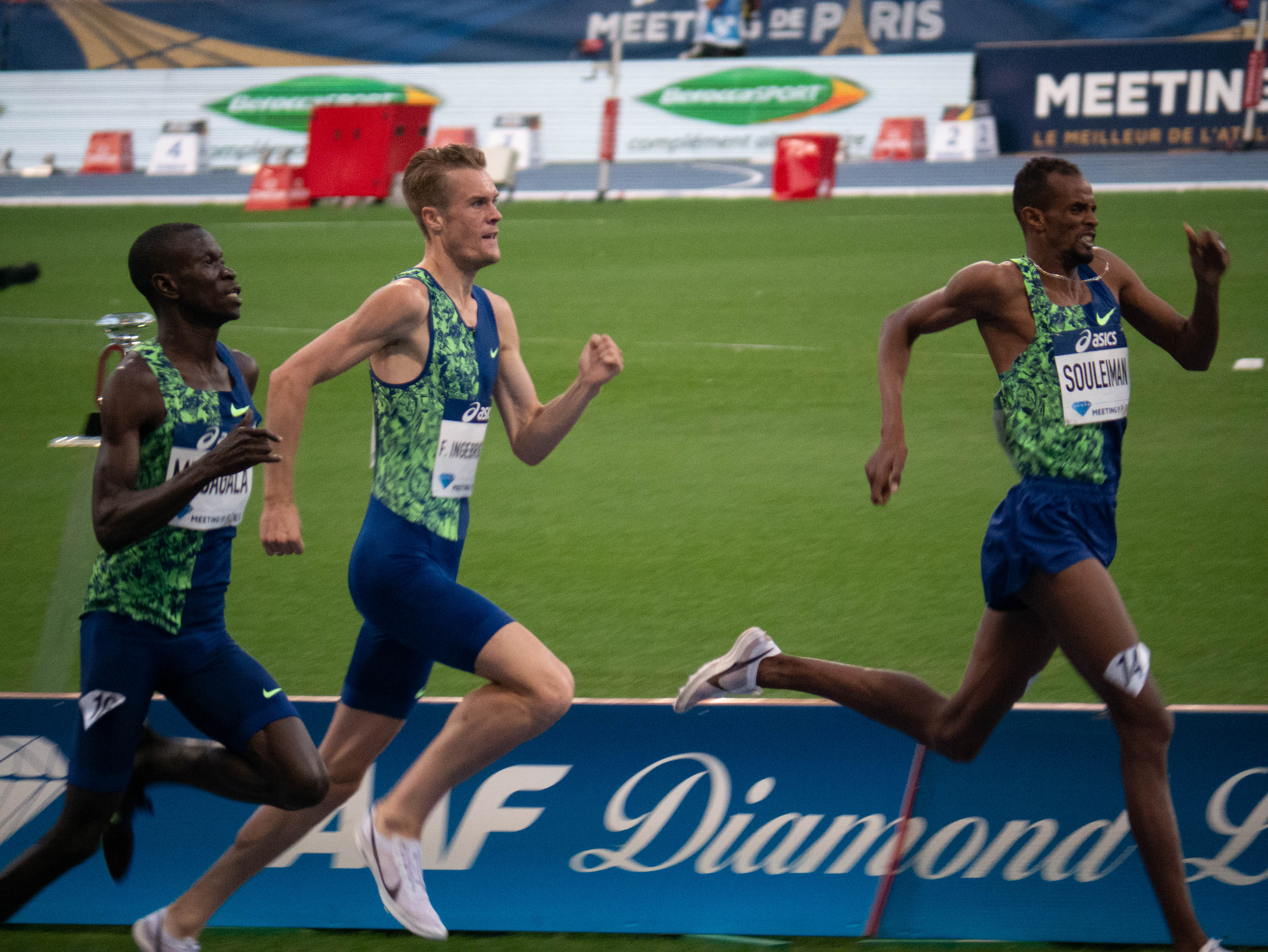
- Level: 2022 Diamond League

The 2022 Meeting de Paris was the 27th edition of the annual outdoor track and field meeting in Paris, France. Held on 18 June at the Stade Sébastien Charléty, it was the seventh leg of the 2022 Diamond League – the highest level international track and field circuit. This was the third time the meeting was held on the stadium's renovated blue running track.

It was 94 °F (34 °C) at the start of the meet, making for unusually hot conditions that favored sprinting. The meeting was highlighted by Winfred Yavi running 8:56 to become the 4th-fastest 3000 metres steeplechase runner of all time, and Shelly-Ann Fraser-Pryce winning the 100 metres in a 10.67 world lead.

== Results ==
Athletes competing in the Diamond League disciplines earned extra compensation and points which went towards qualifying for the Diamond League finals in Zürich. First place earned 8 points, with each step down in place earning one less point than the previous, until no points are awarded in 9th place or lower.

=== Diamond Discipline ===
Men's 200m (+0.6 m/s)
Place	Athlete	Country	Time	Points
1st place, gold medalist(s)	Luxolo Adams	South Africa	19.82	8
2nd place, silver medalist(s)	Alexander Ogando	Dominican Republic	20.03	7
3rd place, bronze medalist(s)	Mouhamadou Fall	France	20.26	6
4	Andre De Grasse	Canada	20.38	5
5	Fausto Desalu	Italy	20.52	4
6	Yancarlos Martínez	Dominican Republic	20.61	3
7	Benjamin Azamati	Ghana	20.77	2
	Amaury Golitin	France	DQ	

Men's 400m
Place	Athlete	Country	Time	Points
1st place, gold medalist(s)	Steven Gardiner	Bahamas	44.21	8
2nd place, silver medalist(s)	Lidio Andrés Feliz	Dominican Republic	44.92	7
3rd place, bronze medalist(s)	Zakithi Nene	South Africa	44.99	6
4	Trevor Stewart	United States	45.18	5
5	Liemarvin Bonevacia	Netherlands	45.75	4
6	Loïc Prévot	France	45.94	3
7	Kevin Borlée	Belgium	46.64	2

Men's 800m
Place	Athlete	Country	Time	Points
1st place, gold medalist(s)	Benjamin Robert	France	1:43.75	8
2nd place, silver medalist(s)	Peter Bol	Australia	1:44.00	7
3rd place, bronze medalist(s)	Tony van Diepen	Netherlands	1:44.14	6
4	Gabriel Tual	France	1:44.23	5
5	Mohamed Ali Gouaned	Algeria	1:44.43	4
6	Pierre-Ambroise Bosse	France	1:44.54	3
7	Andreas Kramer	Sweden	1:44.75	2
8	Patryk Dobek	Poland	1:45.15	1
9	Elliot Giles	Great Britain	1:45.94	
10	Amel Tuka	Bosnia and Herzegovina	1:46.88	
	Patryk Sieradzki	Poland	DNF	

Men's 5000m
Place	Athlete	Country	Time	Points
1st place, gold medalist(s)	Selemon Barega	Ethiopia	12:56.19	8
2nd place, silver medalist(s)	Thierry Ndikumwenayo	Burundi	13:05.24	7
3rd place, bronze medalist(s)	Muktar Edris	Ethiopia	13:06.54	6
4	Jimmy Gressier	France	13:08.75	5
5	Addisu Yihune	Ethiopia	13:14.40	4
6	Geordie Beamish	New Zealand	13:19.90	3
7	Mike Foppen	Netherlands	13:20.34	2
8	Abdessamad Oukhelfen	Spain	13:22.77	1
9	Hamish Carson	New Zealand	13:23.37	
10	Rodrigue Kwizera	Burundi	13:26.17	
11	Hugo Hay	France	13:30.73	
12	Isaac Kimeli	Belgium	13:35.74	
13	Per Svela	Norway	13:54.60	
	Hicham Akankam	Morocco	DNF	
	Ben Buckingham	Australia	DNF	
	Yemaneberhan Crippa	Italy	DNF	
	Nibret Melak	Ethiopia	DNF	

Men's 110mH (−0.2 m/s)
Place	Athlete	Country	Time	Points
1st place, gold medalist(s)	Devon Allen	United States	13.16	8
2nd place, silver medalist(s)	Rafael Pereira	Brazil	13.25	7
3rd place, bronze medalist(s)	Just Kwaou-Mathey	France	13.27	6
4	Damian Czykier	Poland	13.31	5
5	Milan Trajkovic	Cyprus	13.39	4
6	Andrew Pozzi	Great Britain	13.49	3
7	Asier Martínez	Spain	13.69	2
	Aaron Mallett	United States	DQ	

Men's 110mH Round 1
Place	Athlete	Country	Time	Heat
1	Devon Allen	United States	13.20	2
2	Rafael Pereira	Brazil	13.25	2
3	Asier Martínez	Spain	13.30	1
4	Sasha Zhoya	France	13.40	1
5	Aaron Mallett	United States	13.42	1
6	Damian Czykier	Poland	13.44	2
7	Just Kwaou-Mathey	France	13.44	2
8	Milan Trajkovic	Cyprus	13.47	2
9	Andrew Pozzi	Great Britain	13.54	1
10	Pascal Martinot-Lagarde	France	13.55	1
11	Jason Joseph	Switzerland	13.59	1
12	Raphael Mohamed	France	13.62	2
13	Kenny Fletcher	France	14.03	1
14	Jérémie Lararaudeuse	Mauritius	14.21	2
	Jeanice Laviolette	France	DNF	1

Men's Pole Vault
Place	Athlete	Country	Mark	Points
1st place, gold medalist(s)	Ben Broeders	Belgium	5.80 m	8
2nd place, silver medalist(s)	Renaud Lavillenie	France	5.80 m	7
3rd place, bronze medalist(s)	Thibaut Collet	France	5.75 m	6
4	Anthony Ammirati	France	5.65 m	5
5	Kurtis Marschall	Australia	5.65 m	4
6	Baptiste Thiery	France	5.65 m	3
7	Valentin Lavillenie	France	5.65 m	2
8	Harry Coppell	Great Britain	5.50 m	1
9	Thiago Braz	Brazil	5.50 m	
10	Huang Bokai	China	5.35 m	

Men's Triple Jump
Place	Athlete	Country	Mark	Points
1st place, gold medalist(s)	Jordan Díaz	Cuba	17.66 m (−1.4 m/s)	8
2nd place, silver medalist(s)	Andy Díaz	Cuba	17.65 m (−0.8 m/s)	7
3rd place, bronze medalist(s)	Pedro Pichardo	Portugal	17.49 m (−1.1 m/s)	6
4	Hugues Fabrice Zango	Burkina Faso	17.25 m (−0.6 m/s)	5
5	Almir dos Santos	Brazil	16.81 m (−0.5 m/s)	4
6	Zhu Yaming	China	16.76 m (+0.4 m/s)	3
7	Christian Taylor	United States	16.54 m (+0.9 m/s)	2
8	Benjamin Compaoré	France	16.43 m (+0.5 m/s)	1
9	Melvin Raffin	France	15.77 m (−1.1 m/s)	

Women's 100m (+0.5 m/s)
Place	Athlete	Country	Time	Points
1st place, gold medalist(s)	Shelly-Ann Fraser-Pryce	Jamaica	10.67	8
2nd place, silver medalist(s)	Daryll Neita	Great Britain	10.99	7
3rd place, bronze medalist(s)	Marie-Josée Ta Lou	Ivory Coast	11.01	6
4	Ewa Swoboda	Poland	11.05	5
5	Michelle-Lee Ahye	Trinidad and Tobago	11.07	4
6	Zoe Hobbs	New Zealand	11.10	3
7	Gina Bass	Gambia	11.24	2
8	Ajla Del Ponte	Switzerland	11.34	1

Women's 400m
Place	Athlete	Country	Time	Points
1st place, gold medalist(s)	Shaunae Miller-Uibo	Bahamas	50.10	8
2nd place, silver medalist(s)	Natalia Kaczmarek	Poland	50.24	7
3rd place, bronze medalist(s)	Anna Kiełbasińska	Poland	50.28	6
4	Fiordaliza Cofil	Dominican Republic	50.76	5
5	Lieke Klaver	Netherlands	50.80	4
6	Justyna Święty-Ersetic	Poland	51.05	3
7	Amandine Brossier	France	51.78	2
8	Shana Grebo	France	51.98	1

Women's 100mH (−0.4 m/s)
Place	Athlete	Country	Time	Points
1st place, gold medalist(s)	Tobi Amusan	Nigeria	12.41	8
2nd place, silver medalist(s)	Devynne Charlton	Bahamas	12.63	7
3rd place, bronze medalist(s)	Cindy Sember	Great Britain	12.73	6
4	Cyréna Samba-Mayela	France	12.76	5
5	Liz Clay	Australia	12.89	4
6	Ditaji Kambundji	Switzerland	12.90	3
7	Laëticia Bapté	France	13.05	2

Women's 3000mSC
Place	Athlete	Country	Time	Points
1st place, gold medalist(s)	Winfred Yavi	Bahrain	8:56.55	8
2nd place, silver medalist(s)	Sembo Almayew	Ethiopia	9:09.19	7
3rd place, bronze medalist(s)	Mekides Abebe	Ethiopia	9:11.09	6
4	Elizabeth Bird	Great Britain	9:19.46	5
5	Chiara Scherrer	Switzerland	9:20.28	4
6	Zerfe Wondemagegn	Ethiopia	9:27.75	3
7	Rosefline Chepngetich	Kenya	9:32.67	2
8	Kinga Królik	Poland	9:37.29	1
9	Alice Finot	France	9:37.46	
10	Flavie Renouard	France	9:50.33	
	Virginia Nyambura Nganga	Kenya	DNF	

Women's High Jump
Place	Athlete	Country	Mark	Points
1st place, gold medalist(s)	Yaroslava Mahuchikh	Ukraine	2.01 m	8
2nd place, silver medalist(s)	Iryna Herashchenko	Ukraine	1.98 m	7
3rd place, bronze medalist(s)	Nicola Olyslagers	Australia	1.95 m	6
4	Yuliya Levchenko	Ukraine	1.95 m	5
5	Marija Vuković	Montenegro	1.95 m	4
6	Kateryna Tabashnyk	Ukraine	1.95 m	3
7	Nafissatou Thiam	Belgium	1.92 m	2
8	Elena Vallortigara	Italy	1.88 m	1
9	Solène Gicquel	France	1.88 m	
	Laureen Maxwell	France	NM	

Women's Discus Throw
Place	Athlete	Country	Mark	Points
1st place, gold medalist(s)	Valarie Allman	United States	68.68 m	8
2nd place, silver medalist(s)	Sandra Perković	Croatia	68.19 m	7
3rd place, bronze medalist(s)	Kristin Pudenz	Germany	64.39 m	6
4	Shanice Craft	Germany	63.14 m	5
5	Laulauga Tausaga	United States	62.79 m	4
6	Claudine Vita	Germany	62.60 m	3
7	Marike Steinacker	Germany	61.87 m	2
8	Liliana Cá	Portugal	61.73 m	1
9	Mélina Robert-Michon	France	61.10 m	
10	Amanda Ngandu-Ntumba	France	55.10 m	

Women's Javelin Throw
Place	Athlete	Country	Mark	Points
1st place, gold medalist(s)	Haruka Kitaguchi	Japan	63.13 m	8
2nd place, silver medalist(s)	Līna Mūze	Latvia	62.56 m	7
3rd place, bronze medalist(s)	Liveta Jasiūnaitė	Lithuania	62.09 m	6
4	Mackenzie Little	Australia	61.23 m	5
5	Kelsey-Lee Barber	Australia	60.60 m	4
6	Barbora Špotáková	Czech Republic	60.35 m	3
7	Elina Tzengko	Greece	58.16 m	2
8	Nikola Ogrodníková	Czech Republic	57.58 m	1
9	Alizée Minard	France	56.21 m	
10	Eda Tuğsuz	Turkey	52.87 m	

=== National Events ===
Men's 100m (−1.6 m/s)
Place	Athlete	Country	Time
1st place, gold medalist(s)	Benjamin Azamati	Ghana	10.25
2nd place, silver medalist(s)	Mouhamadou Fall	France	10.32
3rd place, bronze medalist(s)	Jimmy Vicaut	France	10.34
4	Aymeric Priam	France	10.35
5	Henricho Bruintjies	South Africa	10.38
6	Sean Safo-Antwi	Ghana	10.45
7	Hassan Taftian	Iran	10.52
8	Jeff Erius	France	10.62
