= 2023 Meeting International Mohammed VI d'Athlétisme de Rabat =

- Dates: 28 May 2023
- Host city: Rabat, Morocco
- Venue: Prince Moulay Abdellah Stadium
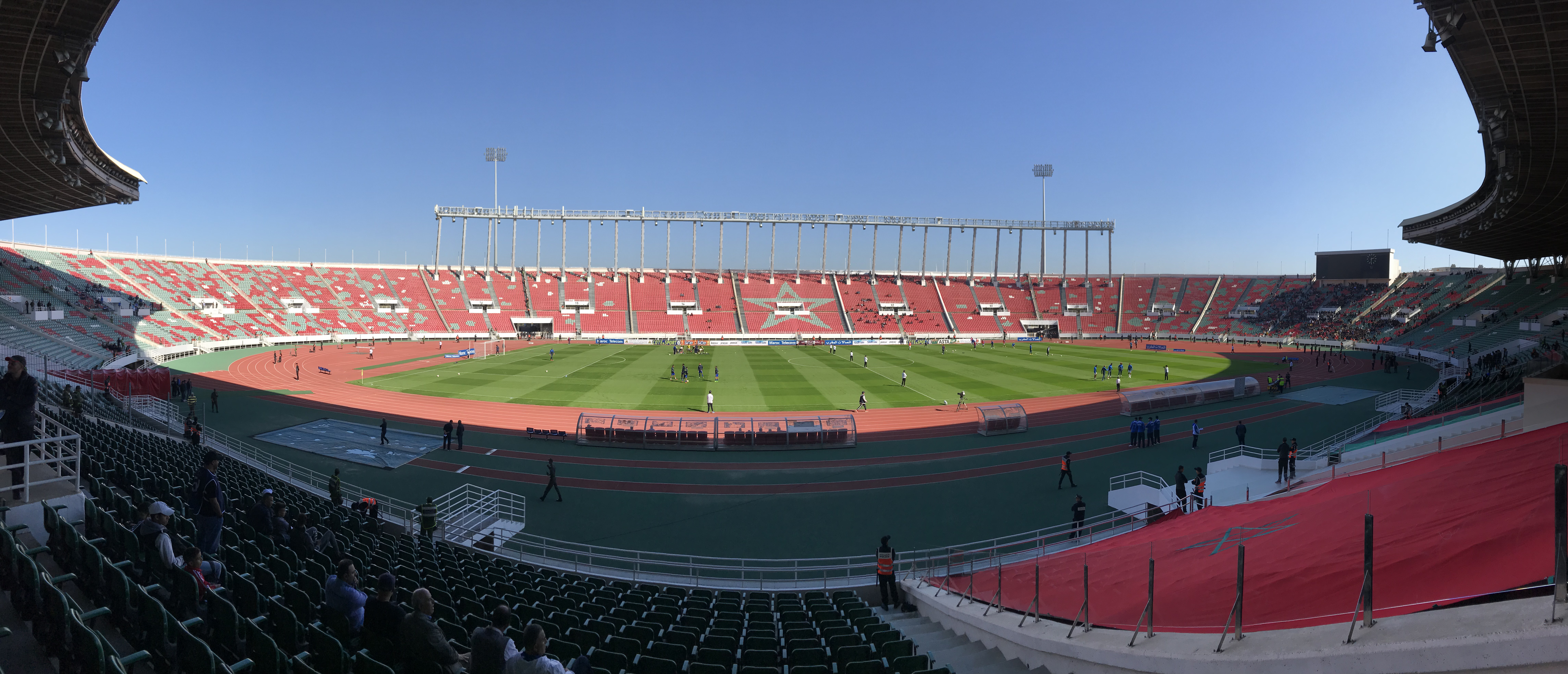
- Level: 2023 Diamond League

The 2023 Meeting International Mohammed VI d'Athlétisme de Rabat was the 14th edition of the annual outdoor track and field meeting in Rabat, Morocco. Held on 28 May at the Prince Moulay Abdellah Stadium, it was the second leg of the 2023 Diamond League – the highest level international track and field circuit.

The meeting was initially promoted as the first match between World champ Fred Kerley and Olympic champ Marcell Jacobs in the 100 metres since Kerley's title, however Jacobs withdrew before the meet due to injury leaving Kerley to take the win. In the 3000 metres steeplechase, hometown Moroccan Soufiane El Bakkali won the event in 7:56.68, the fastest time ever run in 11 years.

== Results ==
Athletes competing in the Diamond League disciplines earned extra compensation and points which went towards qualifying for the Diamond League finals in Eugene. First place earned 8 points, with each step down in place earning one less point than the previous, until no points are awarded in 9th place or lower.

=== Diamond Discipline ===
Men's 100m (+0.1 m/s)
Place	Athlete	Country	Time	Points
1st place, gold medalist(s)	Fred Kerley	United States	9.94	8
2nd place, silver medalist(s)	Akani Simbine	South Africa	9.99	7
3rd place, bronze medalist(s)	Ferdinand Omanyala	Kenya	10.05	6
4	Letsile Tebogo	Botswana	10.09	5
5	Trayvon Bromell	United States	10.10	4
6	Yohan Blake	Jamaica	10.18	3
7	Jeremiah Azu	Great Britain	10.20	2
8	Mouhamadou Fall	France	10.25	1
9	Chakir Machmour	Morocco	10.63	

Men's 400m
Place	Athlete	Country	Time	Points
1st place, gold medalist(s)	Steven Gardiner	Bahamas	44.70	8
2nd place, silver medalist(s)	Vernon Norwood	United States	45.11	7
3rd place, bronze medalist(s)	Rusheen McDonald	Jamaica	45.55	6
4	Zakithi Nene	South Africa	45.58	5
5	Bayapo Ndori	Botswana	45.62	4
6	Alex Haydock-Wilson	Great Britain	46.08	3
7	Hamza Dair	Morocco	47.09	2
	Matthew Hudson-Smith	Great Britain	DNF	

Men's 800m
Place	Athlete	Country	Time	Points
1st place, gold medalist(s)	Emmanuel Wanyonyi	Kenya	1:44.36	8
2nd place, silver medalist(s)	Wyclife Kinyamal	Kenya	1:44.73	7
3rd place, bronze medalist(s)	Benjamin Robert	France	1:45.04	6
4	Eliott Crestan	Belgium	1:45.37	5
5	Marco Arop	Canada	1:46.34	4
6	Catalin Tecuceanu	Italy	1:46.76	3
7	Abdelati El Guesse	Morocco	1:47.10	2
8	Emmanuel Korir	Kenya	1:48.42	1
9	Mouad Zahafi	Morocco	2:57.33	
	Patryk Sieradzki	Poland	DNF	

Men's 1500m
Place	Athlete	Country	Time	Points
1st place, gold medalist(s)	Jakob Ingebrigtsen	Norway	3:32.59	8
2nd place, silver medalist(s)	Yared Nuguse	United States	3:33.02	7
3rd place, bronze medalist(s)	Ollie Hoare	Australia	3:33.39	6
4	Azeddine Habz	France	3:33.90	5
5	Abel Kipsang	Kenya	3:34.46	4
6	Mario García	Spain	3:34.69	3
7	Hicham Akankam	Morocco	3:36.75	2
8	Michał Rozmys	Poland	3:37.22	1
9	Abdelatif Sadiki	Morocco	3:37.98	
10	Charles Simotwo	Kenya	3:38.53	
11	Hafid Rizqy	Morocco	3:38.80	
12	Elhassane Moujahid	Morocco	3:38.89	
13	Filip Ingebrigtsen	Norway	3:39.28	
	Patryk Sieradzki	Poland	DNF	
	Julian Ranc	France	DNF	
	Ismael Debjani	Belgium	DNF	

Men's 110mH (−1.3 m/s)
Place	Athlete	Country	Time	Points
1st place, gold medalist(s)	Rasheed Broadbell	Jamaica	13.08	8
2nd place, silver medalist(s)	Grant Holloway	United States	13.12	7
3rd place, bronze medalist(s)	Hansle Parchment	Jamaica	13.24	6
4	Devon Allen	United States	13.25	5
5	Freddie Crittenden	United States	13.43	4
6	Rafael Pereira	Brazil	13.68	3
7	Pascal Martinot-Lagarde	France	13.69	2
8	Mohamed Koussi	Morocco	13.70	1
9	Damian Czykier	Poland	13.83	

Men's 3000mSC
Place	Athlete	Country	Time	Points
1st place, gold medalist(s)	Soufiane El Bakkali	Morocco	7:56.68	8
2nd place, silver medalist(s)	Getnet Wale	Ethiopia	8:05.15	7
3rd place, bronze medalist(s)	Abraham Kibiwot	Kenya	8:05.51	6
4	Hillary Bor	United States	8:11.28	5
5	Leonard Bett	Kenya	8:14.42	4
6	Osama Zoghlami	Italy	8:14.58	3
7	Benjamin Kigen	Kenya	8:15.58	2
8	Mohammed Msaad	Morocco	8:16.18	1
9	Mohamed Amin Jhinaoui	Tunisia	8:16.49	
10	Avinash Sable	India	8:17.18	
11	Salaheddine Ben Yazide	Morocco	8:17.49	
12	Djilali Bedrani	France	8:17.79	
13	Mohamed Tindouft	Morocco	8:20.85	
14	Amos Serem	Kenya	8:25.08	
	Conseslus Kipruto	Kenya	DNF	
	Wilberforce Chemiat Kones	Kenya	DNF	
	Abderrafia Bouassel	Morocco	DNF	
	Hailemariyam Amare	Ethiopia	DNF	

Men's Discus Throw
Place	Athlete	Country	Mark	Points
1st place, gold medalist(s)	Kristjan Čeh	Slovenia	70.32 m	8
2nd place, silver medalist(s)	Daniel Ståhl	Sweden	69.21 m	7
3rd place, bronze medalist(s)	Andrius Gudžius	Lithuania	66.04 m	6
4	Lawrence Okoye	Great Britain	65.62 m	5
5	Sam Mattis	United States	63.91 m	4
6	Alin Firfirică	Romania	63.43 m	3
7	Simon Pettersson	Sweden	62.25 m	2
8	Apostolos Parellis	Cyprus	60.95 m	1

Women's 200m (+0.8 m/s)
Place	Athlete	Country	Time	Points
1st place, gold medalist(s)	Shericka Jackson	Jamaica	21.98	8
2nd place, silver medalist(s)	Anthonique Strachan	Bahamas	22.15	7
3rd place, bronze medalist(s)	Tamari Davis	United States	22.30	6
4	Kayla White	United States	22.52	5
5	Bassant Hemida	Egypt	22.67	4
6	Anna Kiełbasińska	Poland	22.98	3
7	Gina Bass	Gambia	23.44	2
8	Paula Sevilla	Spain	23.58	1

Women's 800m
Place	Athlete	Country	Time	Points
1st place, gold medalist(s)	Mary Moraa	Kenya	1:58.72	8
2nd place, silver medalist(s)	Catriona Bisset	Australia	2:00.11	7
3rd place, bronze medalist(s)	Sage Hurta	United States	2:00.62	6
4	Natoya Goule	Jamaica	2:00.91	5
5	Anita Horvat	Slovenia	2:01.30	4
6	Lore Hoffmann	Switzerland	2:01.37	3
7	Assia Raziki	Morocco	2:01.75	2
8	Noélie Yarigo	Benin	2:02.15	1
	Soukaina Hajji	Morocco	DNF	
	Patrycja Wyciszkiewicz	Poland	DNF	

Women's 1500m
Place	Athlete	Country	Time	Points
1st place, gold medalist(s)	Gudaf Tsegay	Ethiopia	3:54.03	8
2nd place, silver medalist(s)	Freweyni Hailu	Ethiopia	3:57.65	7
3rd place, bronze medalist(s)	Birke Haylom	Ethiopia	3:57.66	6
4	Worknesh Mesele	Ethiopia	4:01.81	5
5	Cory McGee	United States	4:03.09	4
6	Linden Hall	Australia	4:03.56	3
7	Sarah Healy	Ireland	4:03.57	2
8	Ludovica Cavalli	Italy	4:04.82	1
9	Adelle Tracey	Jamaica	4:08.22	
10	Winnie Nanyondo	Uganda	4:08.43	
11	Claudia Bobocea	Romania	4:09.91	
	Zoya Naumov	Spain	DNF	
	Charlotte Mouchet	France	DNF	

Women's 400mH
Place	Athlete	Country	Time	Points
1st place, gold medalist(s)	Shamier Little	United States	53.95	8
2nd place, silver medalist(s)	Rushell Clayton	Jamaica	54.15	7
3rd place, bronze medalist(s)	Shiann Salmon	Jamaica	54.42	6
4	Janieve Russell	Jamaica	55.41	5
5	Dalilah Muhammad	United States	55.72	4
6	Gianna Woodruff	Panama	55.74	3
7	Noura Ennadi	Morocco	55.83	2
8	Anna Ryzhykova	Ukraine	56.97	1

Women's High Jump
Place	Athlete	Country	Mark	Points
1st place, gold medalist(s)	Yaroslava Mahuchikh	Ukraine	2.01 m	8
2nd place, silver medalist(s)	Iryna Herashchenko	Ukraine	1.91 m	7
3rd place, bronze medalist(s)	Angelina Topić	Serbia	1.87 m	6
4	Nadezhda Dubovitskaya	Kazakhstan	1.87 m	5
5	Morgan Lake	Great Britain	1.87 m	4
6	Yuliya Levchenko	Ukraine	1.81 m	3
7	Elena Vallortigara	Italy	1.81 m	2
	Rhizlane Siba	Morocco	NM	
	Karmen Bruus	Estonia	NM	

Women's Triple Jump
Place	Athlete	Country	Mark	Points
1st place, gold medalist(s)	Leyanis Pérez	Cuba	14.84 m (+1.1 m/s)	8
2nd place, silver medalist(s)	Maryna Bekh-Romanchuk	Ukraine	14.65 m (+1.8 m/s)	7
3rd place, bronze medalist(s)	Shanieka Ricketts	Jamaica	14.53 m (+1.0 m/s)	6
4	Liadagmis Povea	Cuba	14.27 m (−0.3 m/s)	5
5	Tori Franklin	United States	14.22 m (+0.6 m/s)	4
6	Thea LaFond	Dominica	14.18 m (−0.5 m/s)	3
7	Keturah Orji	United States	13.90 m (±0.0 m/s)	2
8	Kristiina Mäkelä	Finland	13.67 m (+1.8 m/s)	1
9	Kimberly Williams	Jamaica	13.04 m (−0.3 m/s)	
—	Hanna Knyazyeva-Minenko	Israel	NM	

Women's Shot Put
Place	Athlete	Country	Mark	Points
1st place, gold medalist(s)	Auriol Dongmo	Portugal	19.28 m	8
2nd place, silver medalist(s)	Jessica Schilder	Netherlands	18.85 m	7
3rd place, bronze medalist(s)	Jessica Woodard	United States	18.65 m	6
4	Sara Gambetta	Germany	18.63 m	5
5	Sarah Mitton	Canada	18.56 m	4
6	Fanny Roos	Sweden	18.51 m	3
7	Jessica Inchude	Portugal	17.78 m	2
8	Anita Márton	Hungary	17.64 m	1

=== National events ===
Men's 200m (−0.2 m/s)
Place	Athlete	Country	Time
1st place, gold medalist(s)	Aymane El Haddaoui	Morocco	21.53
2nd place, silver medalist(s)	Mohamed Yassine Zerhoumi	Morocco	21.87
3rd place, bronze medalist(s)	Moncif Nahal	Morocco	21.89
4	Abdelghani Zghali	Morocco	22.32
5	Amine Ait Elhadj	Morocco	22.44
6	Ilyass Zarriq	Morocco	22.64
7	Adam Fourar	Morocco	22.68
8	Abdelali Ouyamna	Morocco	22.81

Men's 400m
Place	Athlete	Country	Time
1st place, gold medalist(s)	Rachid Mhamdi	Morocco	47.35
2nd place, silver medalist(s)	Kamal Mottakil	Morocco	47.48
3rd place, bronze medalist(s)	Said el Guebbaz	Morocco	47.59
4	El Mehdi Dimokrati	Morocco	47.72
5	Yassine Hssine	Morocco	48.38
6	Lahssen Taleb	Morocco	48.70
7	Walid el Boussiri	Morocco	48.84
8	Farid Hasnaoui	Morocco	49.85

Women's 200m (+1.4 m/s)
Place	Athlete	Country	Time
1st place, gold medalist(s)	Sara el-Hachimi	Morocco	24.46
2nd place, silver medalist(s)	Salma Lehlali	Morocco	24.70
3rd place, bronze medalist(s)	Houda Nouiri	Morocco	25.01
4	Razki Doha	Morocco	25.45
5	Kenza Ghalla	Morocco	26.09
6	Ghita Dahmani	Morocco	26.12
7	Hiba el Houma	Morocco	26.31
	Imane Makrazi	Morocco	DNF

Women's 800m
Place	Athlete	Country	Time
1st place, gold medalist(s)	Meryeme Azrour	Morocco	2:08.92
2nd place, silver medalist(s)	Khadija Ennasri	Morocco	2:08.93
3rd place, bronze medalist(s)	Souad el Haddad	Morocco	2:09.07
4	Aya Boughida	Morocco	2:11.60
5	Assia Ait Taleb	Morocco	2:12.32
6	Khaddouj el Bali	Morocco	2:12.81
7	LamIyae el Abbassi	Morocco	2:15.27

== See also ==
- 2023 Diamond League
