= Aaron Mallett =

American hurdler

Personal information
- Nationality: American
- Born: September 26, 1994 (age 31)
- Home town: St Louis, Missouri
- Height: 188 cm (6 ft 2 in)
- Weight: 79 kg (174 lb)

Sport
- Sport: Athletics
- Event(s): 110 metres hurdles, 60 metres hurdles
- College team: Iowa Hawkeyes
- Club: Tracksmith
- Coached by: Joey Woody

Achievements and titles
- Personal bests: 110mH: 13.15 (+0.3) (2020); 60mH: 7.54 A (2020)
Medal record
Men's athletics
Representing United States
NACAC U23 Championships
Silver medal – second place	2016 San Salvador	110 m hurdles

Aaron Mallett (born 26 September 1994) is an American hurdler. He was the 2020 Doha Diamond League and 2020 USA Indoor Track and Field Championships champion in the 60 metres hurdles.

== Biography ==
Mallett was raised in St. Louis, Missouri, where he attended McCluer North High School and was a state champion in the 110 metres hurdles his junior year. From 2014 to 2017, Mallet was a member of the Iowa Hawkeyes track and field team, with his best collegiate finish being a bronze at the 2016 NCAA Division I Indoor Track and Field Championships in the 60 metres hurdles.

In 2016, Mallet won the bronze medal at the 2016 NACAC U23 Championships in Athletics in the 110 m hurdles, which was later upgraded to a silver medal after race winner Will Barnes was disqualified due to a antidoping rules violation.

In the three years following his college graduation, Mallett worked 10 different jobs, including multiple at once, while training with no major sponsor. He had a breakout year in 2020, winning the USATF indoor championships and the 2020 Doha Diamond League in personal best times of 7.54 and 13.15 seconds respectively for 60 m hurdles and 110 m hurdles.

== Statistics ==
=== Personal bests ===
Event	Mark	Competition	Venue	Date
110 metres hurdles	13.15	2020 Doha Diamond League	Doha, Qatar	25 September 2020
60 metres hurdles	7.54 A	2020 USA Indoor Track and Field Championships	Albuquerque, New Mexico	15 February 2020
