= Payton Chadwick =

American hurdler (born 1995)

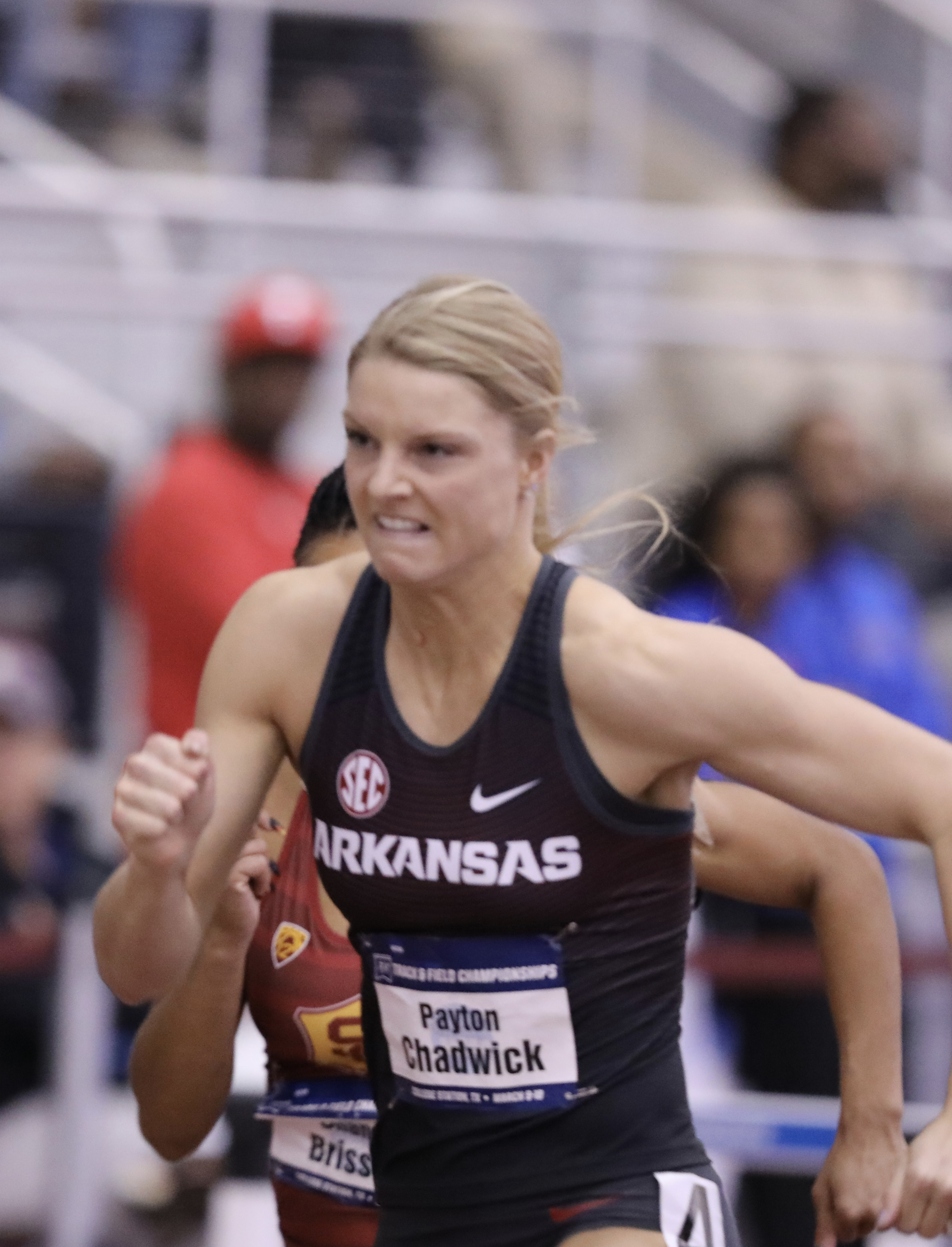
- Chadwick at the 2018 NCAA Division I Indoor Track and Field Championships

Personal information
- Full name: Payton Stumbaugh Chadwick
- Nationality: United States
- Born: Payton Stumbaugh; 29 November 1995 (age 30)
- Home town: Springdale, Arkansas
- Education: Har-Ber High School; University of Arkansas
- Height: 173 cm (5 ft 8 in)

Sport
- Sport: Athletics
- Events: 100 metres hurdles 200 metres Heptathlon
- College team: Oklahoma Sooners; Arkansas Razorbacks

Achievements and titles
- National finals: 2016 NCAA Indoors; • Pentathlon, 5th; • 60 m hurdles, 7th; 2016 NCAAs; • Heptathlon, 6th; 2016 USA Champs; • 100 m hurdles, DNS; • Heptathlon, DNS; 2017 NCAAs; • Heptathlon, DNF; • 4 × 100 m, 6th; 2017 USA Champs; • Heptathlon, 9th; 2018 NCAA Indoors; • Long jump, 9th; • 60 m hurdles, 1st (gold); 2019 NCAA Indoors; • 60 m hurdles, 3rd (bronze); • 4 × 400 m, 3rd (bronze); 2019 NCAAs; • 100 m hurdles, 8th; • 4 × 100 m, 3rd (bronze); • 4 × 400 m, 2nd (silver); 2020 USA Indoors; • 60 m hurdles, 2nd (silver); 2021 USA Champs; • 100 m hurdles, 7th
- Personal bests: 100 m hs : 12.62 (+0.4) (2021); 200 m: 22.97 i (2019); HEP: 6023 (2017)
- Updated on 6 December 2023

Payton Stumbaugh Chadwick (born 29 November 1995) is an American hurdler and heptathlete. She was the 2018 NCAA indoor champion in the 60 metres hurdles, and the second place finisher at the 2020 USA Indoor Track and Field Championships.

== Biography ==
Chadwick grew up in Springdale, Arkansas where she attended Har-Ber High School and won state championships in the high jump, 100 metres, 200 metres, 300 metres hurdles, and 100 metres hurdles. Her parents were both collegiate runners. She was inspired by Jodi Unger and April Steiner-Bennett to try the pole vault as well.

After spending her first year on the Oklahoma Sooners track and field team, she transferred to the Arkansas Razorbacks track and field program. At the 2018 NCAA Division I Indoor Track and Field Championships, she won the 60 m hurdles, her first NCAA national title. She defeated Anna Cockrell for the win by just 0.004 seconds, with both runners setting personal bests in the final.

In 2020, Chadwick achieved her first senior national podium finish by placing 2nd in the 60 m hurdles at the 2020 USA Indoor Track and Field Championships. After the COVID-19 pandemic, Chadwick moved to Paris, Texas with her husband to train for the 2021 Summer Olympics.

At the 2021 United States Olympic trials, Chadwick finished 7th in the 100 metres hurdles final.

Chadwick also owns a cooking brand, Prepping with Pay, along with her husband and Arkansas Razorbacks baseball player Cannon Chadwick.

== Statistics ==
=== Personal bests ===
Event	Mark	Place	Competition	Venue	Date
100 metres hurdles	12.62 (+0.4 m/s)	4th	Zurich Diamond League	Zurich, Switzerland	9 September 2021
High jump	1.76 m	3rd place, bronze medalist(s)	Texas Relays	Austin, Texas	29 March 2017
Shot put	12.14 m i	10th	NCAA Division I Women's Indoor Track and Field Championships	Birmingham, Alabama	11 March 2016
200 metres	22.97 i	2nd place, silver medalist(s)	Razorback Invitational	Fayetteville, Arkansas	26 January 2019
Long jump	6.30 m i	1st place, gold medalist(s)	Arkansas Invitational	Fayetteville, Arkansas	12 January 2018
Javelin throw	39.54 m	10th	Texas Relays	Austin, Texas	31 March 2016
800 metres	2:14.73	2nd place, silver medalist(s)	Southeastern Conference track and field Outdoor Championships	Tuscaloosa, Alabama	13 May 2016
Heptathlon	6023 pts	2nd place, silver medalist(s)	Southeastern Conference track and field Outdoor Championships	Columbia, South Carolina	12 May 2017
