= 2005 IAAF World Outdoor Meetings =

- Edition: 3rd
- Dates: 17 February – 10 September
- Meetings: 34 (+1 final)

The 2005 IAAF World Outdoor Meetings was the third and final edition of the annual global series of one-day track and field competitions organized by the International Association of Athletics Federations (IAAF). The series had four levels: 2005 IAAF Golden League, IAAF Super Grand Prix, IAAF Grand Prix and IAAF Grand Prix II. There were 6 Golden League meetings, 8 Super Grand Prix category meetings, 10 IAAF Grand Prix category meetings and 10 Grand Prix II meetings, making a combined total of 34 meetings for the series.

The series hosted the same number of meetings as the previous year. The Helsinki Grand Prix was restored to the Grand Prix circuit after skipping 2004, while the Adidas Oregon Track Classic was dropped from the Grand Prix II category. Three meetings changed venue from 2003: the Bislett Games returned to Oslo from Bergen following stadium developments, the Athens Grand Prix Tsiklitiria was moved from Heraklion to Athens, and the Norwich Union Super Grand Prix moved from Gateshead to Sheffield.

Performances on designated events on the circuit earned athletes points which qualified them for entry to the 2005 IAAF World Athletics Final, held on 9–10 September Monaco.

The IAAF World Outdoor Meetings circuit was replaced by the IAAF World Athletics Tour the following year.

== Meetings ==
#	Date	Meeting name	City	Country	Level
1	17 February	Telstra A-Series Melbourne	Melbourne	Australia	IAAF Grand Prix II
2	30 April	Meeting du Conseil General de la Martinique	Fort-de-France	France	IAAF Grand Prix II
3	7 May	Japan Grand Prix	Osaka	Japan	IAAF Grand Prix I
4	13 May	Qatar Athletic Super Grand Prix	Doha	Qatar	IAAF Super Grand Prix
5	15 May	Grande Premio Rio de Atletismo	Rio de Janeiro	Brazil	IAAF Grand Prix II
6	22 May	Grande Premio de Brasil de Atletismo	Belém	Brazil	IAAF Grand Prix I
7	29 May	THALES FBK-Games	Hengelo	Netherlands	IAAF Grand Prix I
8	30 May	Payton Jordan U.S. Open	Palo Alto	United States	IAAF Grand Prix II
9	1 June	Grand Prix Regione Lombardia	Milan	Italy	IAAF Grand Prix II
10	3 June	Meeting Memorial Primo Nebiolo	Turin	Italy	IAAF Grand Prix II
11	4 June	Prefontaine Classic	Eugene	United States	IAAF Grand Prix I
12	4 June	Meeting de Atletismo Sevilla	Seville	Spain	IAAF Grand Prix I
13	9 June	Golden Spike Ostrava	Ostrava	Czech Republic	IAAF Super Grand Prix
14	12 June	Lille Metropole Meeting	Villeneuve-d'Ascq	France	IAAF Grand Prix I
15	14 June	Super Grand Prix Tsiklitiria	Heraklion	Greece	IAAF Super Grand Prix
16	25 June	Brothers Znamensky Memorial	Kazan	Russia	IAAF Grand Prix II
17	27 June	Memorial Josefa Odlozila	Prague	Czech Republic	IAAF Grand Prix II
18	1 July	Meeting de Paris	Paris	France	2005 IAAF Golden League
19	5 July	Athletissima	Lausanne	Switzerland	IAAF Super Grand Prix
20	8 July	Golden Gala	Rome	Italy	2005 IAAF Golden League
21	11 July	Grand Prix Zagreb	Zagreb	Croatia	IAAF Grand Prix I
22	16 July	Meeting de Madrid	Madrid	Spain	IAAF Super Grand Prix
23	17 July	International Meeting Thessaloniki	Thessaloniki	Greece	IAAF Grand Prix II
24	22 July	Norwich Union British Grand Prix	London	United Kingdom	IAAF Super Grand Prix
25	23 July	KBC Night of Athletics	Heusden-Zolder	Belgium	IAAF Grand Prix II
26	25 July	Helsinki Grand Prix	Helsinki	Finland	IAAF Grand Prix I
27	26 July	DN Galan	Stockholm	Sweden	IAAF Super Grand Prix
28	29 July	Bislett Games	Oslo	Norway	2005 IAAF Golden League
29	19 August	Weltklasse Zürich	Zürich	Switzerland	2005 IAAF Golden League
30	21 August	Norwich Union Super Grand Prix	Sheffield	United Kingdom	IAAF Super Grand Prix
31	23 August	Intersport Gugl-Meeting	Linz	Austria	IAAF Grand Prix I
32	26 August	Memorial Van Damme	Brussels	Belgium	2005 IAAF Golden League
33	28 August	Rieti Meeting	Rieti	Italy	IAAF Grand Prix I
34	4 September	ISTAF Berlin	Berlin	Germany	2005 IAAF Golden League
F	9–10 September	2005 IAAF World Athletics Final	Fontvieille	Monaco	IAAF World Athletics Final
