= Bauhausgalan =

Annual athletic event

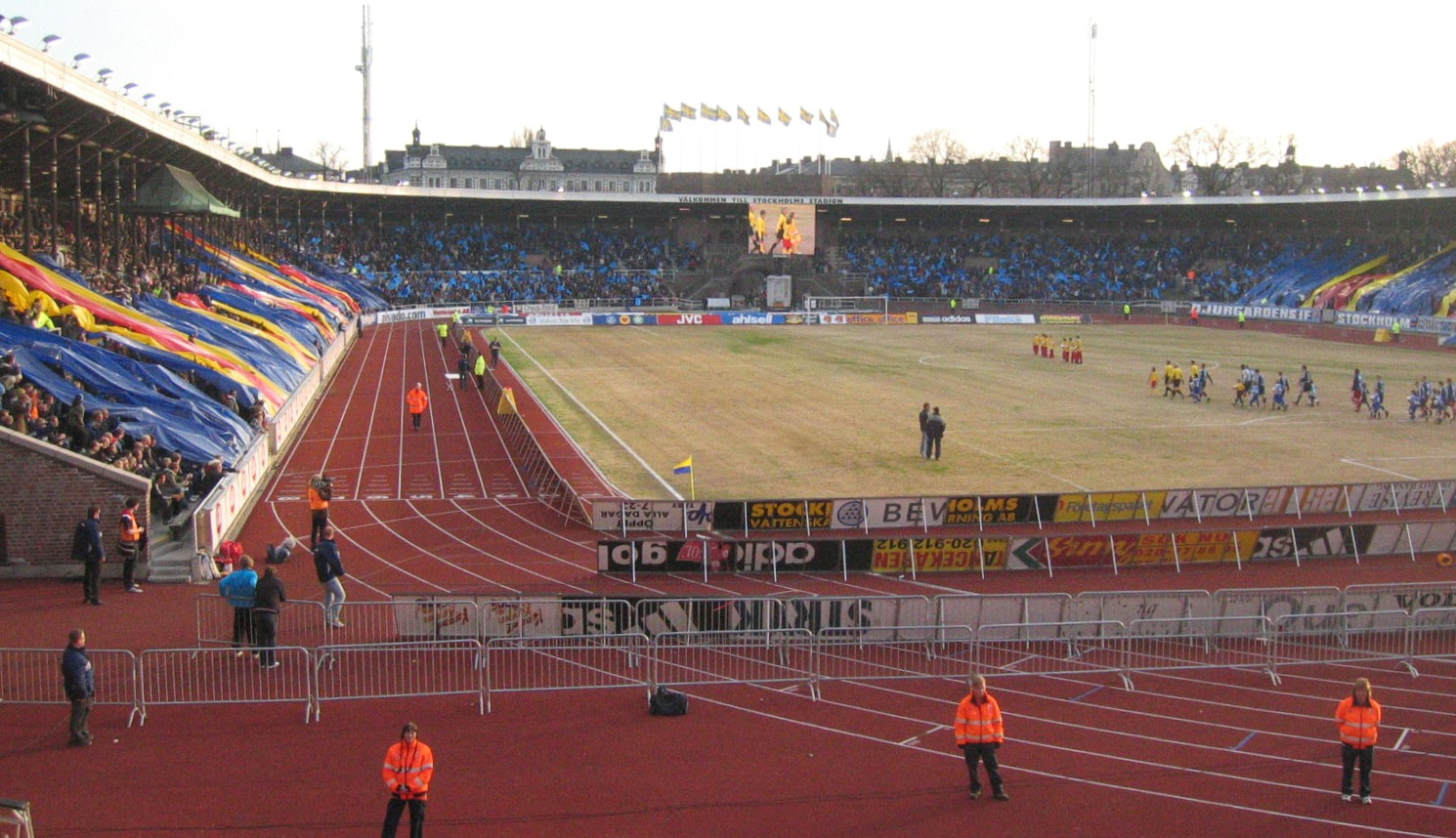
- The host stadium – Stockholm Olympic Stadium
- Date: May – August
- Location: Stockholm, Sweden
- Event type: Track and field
- World Athletics Cat.: GW
- Established: 5 July 1967; 59 years ago
- Website: bauhausgalan.se
- 2026 Bauhausgalan

Logo

Bauhausgalan, styled as BAUHAUS-galan and formerly known as DN-Galan, is an annual, international athletics meeting that takes place at the Olympic Stadium in Stockholm. Previously it was one of the five IAAF Super Grand Prix events until 2010, and has since been part of the Diamond League circuit. It was first organized in 1967.

Having been known as the DN-Galan since its first edition, a title sponsor deal with DIY company Bauhaus led to a rebranding of the event in 2015, following a period of financial instability for the organisers.

Since 1967, the Dicksonpokalen (Dickson Trophy) is awarded to the winner of the men's 1500 metres or mile run at the competition.

== History ==
After the 2019 season concluded the Bauhausgalan was announced to be separating from the professional Diamond League circuit of one-day meets. However, the meet was readmitted into the circuit and included in the Diamond League's 2020 calendar announcement.

== Editions ==
Bauhausgalan editions
Ed.	Meeting	Series	Date	Ref.
1st	1967 DN-galan		5 Jul 1967	
2nd	1968 DN-galan		2–3 Jul 1968	
3rd	1969 DN-galan		2 Jul 1969	
4th	1970 DN-galan		1 Jul 1970	
5th	1971 DN-galan		6–7 Jul 1971	
6th	1972 DN-galan		5–6 Jul 1972	
7th	1973 DN-galan		2–3 Jul 1973	
8th	1974 DN-galan		1–2 Jul 1974	
9th	1975 DN-galan		30 Jun, 1 Jul 1975	
10th	1976 DN-galan		9–10 Aug 1976	
11th	1977 DN-galan		4–5 Jul 1977	
12th	1978 DN-galan		3–4 Jul 1978	
13th	1979 DN-galan		3 Jul 1979	
14th	1980 DN-galan		7–8 Jul 1980	
15th	1981 DN-galan		7–8 Jul 1981	
16th	1982 DN-galan		6 Jul 1982	
17th	1983 DN-galan		4 Jul 1983	
18th	1984 DN-galan		2 Jul 1984	
19th	1985 DN-galan	1985 IAAF Grand Prix	2 Jul 1985	
20th	1986 DN-galan	1986 IAAF Grand Prix	1 Jul 1986	
21st	1987 DN-galan	1988 IAAF Grand Prix	30 Jun 1987	
22nd	1988 DN-galan	1988 IAAF Grand Prix	5 Jul 1988	
23rd	1989 DN-galan	1989 IAAF Grand Prix	3 Jul 1989	
24th	1990 DN-galan	1990 IAAF Grand Prix	2 Jul 1990	
25th	1991 DN-galan	1991 IAAF Grand Prix	3 Jul 1991	
26th	1992 DN-galan	1992 IAAF Grand Prix	2 Jul 1992	
27th	1993 DN-galan	1993 IAAF Grand Prix	5 Jul 1993	
28th	1994 DN-galan	1994 IAAF Grand Prix	12 Jul 1994	
29th	1995 DN-galan	1995 IAAF Grand Prix	10 Jul 1995	
30th	1996 DN-galan	1996 IAAF Grand Prix	8 Jul 1996	
31st	1997 DN-galan	1997 IAAF Grand Prix	7 Jul 1997	
32nd	1998 DN-galan	1998 IAAF Grand Prix	5 Aug 1998	
33rd	1999 DN-galan	1999 IAAF Grand Prix	30 Jul 1999	
34th	2000 DN-galan	2000 IAAF Grand Prix	1 Aug 2000	
35th	2001 DN-galan	2001 IAAF Grand Prix	17 Jul 2001	
36th	2002 DN-galan	2002 IAAF Grand Prix	16 Jul 2002	
37th	2003 DN-galan	2003 IAAF Super Grand Prix	5 Aug 2003	
38th	2004 DN-galan	2004 IAAF Super Grand Prix	27 Jul 2004	
39th	2005 DN-galan	2005 IAAF Super Grand Prix	26 Jul 2005	
40th	2006 DN-galan	2006 IAAF Super Grand Prix	25 Jul 2006	
41st	2007 DN-galan	2007 IAAF Super Grand Prix	7 Aug 2007	
42nd	2008 DN-galan	2008 IAAF Super Grand Prix	21–22 Jul 2008	
43rd	2009 DN-galan	2009 IAAF Super Grand Prix	30–31 Jul 2009	
44th	2010 DN-galan	2010 Diamond League	5–6 Aug 2010	
45th	2011 DN-galan	2011 Diamond League	28–29 Jul 2011	
46th	2012 DN-galan	2012 Diamond League	17 Aug 2012	
47th	2013 DN-galan	2013 Diamond League	22 Aug 2013	
48th	2014 DN-galan	2014 Diamond League	21 Aug 2014	
49th	2015 Bauhausgalan	2015 Diamond League	29–30 Jul 2015	
50th	2016 Bauhausgalan	2016 Diamond League	16 Jun 2016	
51st	2017 Bauhausgalan	2017 Diamond League	18 Jun 2017	
52nd	2018 Bauhausgalan	2018 Diamond League	10 Jun 2018	
53rd	2019 Bauhausgalan	2019 Diamond League	30 May 2019	
54th	2020 Bauhausgalan	2020 Diamond League	23 Aug 2020	
55th	2021 Bauhausgalan	2021 Diamond League	4 Jul 2021	
56th	2022 Bauhausgalan	2022 Diamond League	30 Jun 2022	
57th	2023 Bauhausgalan	2023 Diamond League	2 Jul 2023	
58th	2024 Bauhausgalan	2024 Diamond League	2 Jun 2024	
59th	2025 Bauhausgalan	2025 Diamond League	15 Jun 2025	
60th	2026 Bauhausgalan	2026 Diamond League	7 Jun 2026	

== World records ==
Over the course of its history, numerous world records have been set at the meet.

World records set at Bauhausgalan
Year	Event	Record	Athlete	Nationality
1968	3000 m steeplechase	8.24.2 h	Jouko Kuha	Finland
1972	Javelin throw	93.80 m	Jānis Lūsis	Soviet Union
1972	Discus throw	68.40 m (Note: Bruch equalled the record set by Jay Silvester in 1968.)	Ricky Bruch	Sweden
1975	3000 m steeplechase	8:09.8 h	Anders Gärderud	Sweden
1977	5000 m	13:12.9 h	Dick Quax	New Zealand
1984	10,000 m	27:13.81	Fernando Mamede	Portugal
1987	High jump	2.42 m	Patrik Sjöberg	Sweden
1989	3000 m steeplechase	8:05.35	Peter Koech	Kenya
1989	Triple jump	14.52 m (Note: The final unofficial world record, the IAAF began ratification in 1990.)	Galina Chistyakova	Soviet Union
1990	Javelin throw	89.58 m	Steve Backley	United Kingdom
1993	10,000 m	27:07.91	Richard Chelimo	Kenya
1997	800 m	1:41.73 (Note: Kipketer equalled the record set by Sebastian Coe in 1981.)	Wilson Kipketer	Denmark
2025	Pole vault	6.28 m	Armand Duplantis	Sweden

== Meeting records ==
=== Men ===
Men's meeting records of Bauhausgalan
Event	Record	Athlete	Nationality	Date	Meet	Ref.
100 m	9.84 (±0.0 m/s)	Tyson Gay	United States	6 August 2010	2010	
200 m	19.77 (+0.6 m/s)	Michael Johnson	United States	8 July 1996	1996	
400 m	43.50	Jeremy Wariner	United States	7 August 2007	2007	
600 m	1:15.99	Musaeb Abdulrahman Balla	Qatar	22 August 2013	2013	
800 m	1:41.73	Wilson Kipketer	Denmark	7 July 1997	1997	
1000 m	2:13.93	Abubaker Kaki Khamis	Sudan	22 July 2008	2008	
1500 m	3:29.30	Hicham El Guerrouj	Morocco	7 July 1997	1997	
Mile	3:51.32	John Kibowen	Kenya	5 August 1998	1998	
2000 m	4:50.08	Noah Ngeny	Kenya	30 July 1999	1999	
3000 m	7:25.79	Kenenisa Bekele	Ethiopia	7 August 2007	2007	
5000 m	12:44.27	Andreas Almgren	Sweden	15 June 2025	2025	
10,000 m	26:50.16	Rhonex Kipruto	Kenya	18 May 2019	2019	
110 m hurdles	12.91 (+0.2 m/s)	Dayron Robles	Cuba	22 July 2008	2008	
400 m hurdles	46.54	Rai Benjamin	United States	15 June 2025	2025	
3000 m steeplechase	7:59.42	Paul Kipsiele Koech	Kenya	7 August 2007	2007	
High jump	2.42 m	Patrik Sjöberg	Sweden	30 June 1987	1987	
Pole vault	6.28 m DLR	Armand Duplantis	Sweden	15 June 2025	2025	
Long jump	8.59 m (+0.4 m/s)	Iván Pedroso	Cuba	7 July 1997	1997	
Triple jump	17.93 m (+1.6 m/s)	Kenny Harrison	United States	2 July 1990	1990	
Shot put	22.09 m	Christian Cantwell	United States	5 August 2010	2010	
Discus throw	70.02 m	Kristjan Čeh	Slovenia	30 June 2022	2022	
Hammer throw	77.06 m	Tore Gustafsson	Sweden	3 July 1989	1989	
Javelin throw	95.52 m (old design)	Uwe Hohn	East Germany	2 July 1985	1985	
Javelin throw	90.31 m (current design)	Anderson Peters	Grenada	30 June 2022	2022	
4 × 100 m relay	37.99	United States Blue: Terrence Trammell; Wallace Spearmon; Shawn Crawford; Michael Rodger	United States	22 July 2008	2008	

=== Women ===
Women's meeting records of Bauhausgalan
Event	Record	Athlete	Nationality	Date	Meet	Ref.
100 m	10.75 (+0.9 m/s)	Julien Alfred	St. Lucia	15 June 2025	2025	
200 m	21.88 (+1.3 m/s)	Allyson Felix	United States	31 July 2009	2009	
400 m	49.70	Allyson Felix	United States	7 August 2007	2007	
800 m	1:53.98	Audrey Werro	Switzerland	7 June 2026	2026	
1000 m	2:30.72	Maria Mutola	Mozambique	10 July 1995	1995	
1500 m	3:57.12	Mary Decker	United States	4 July 1983	1983	
Mile	4:24.6 h	Silvana Cruciata	Italy	8 July 1981	1981	
3000 m	8:24.66	Meseret Defar	Ethiopia	25 July 2006	2006	
5000 m	14:12.88	Meseret Defar	Ethiopia	22 July 2008	2008	
10,000 m	31:07.34	Meseret Defar	Ethiopia	31 July 2009	2009	
100 m hurdles	12.33 (+1.4 m/s)	Grace Stark	United States	15 June 2025	2025	
400 m hurdles	52.11	Femke Bol	Netherlands	15 June 2025	2025	
3000 m steeplechase	8:59.28	Marwa Bouzayani	Tunisia	7 June 2026	2026	
High jump	2.07 m	Blanka Vlašić	Croatia	7 August 2007	2007	
Pole vault	4.86 m	Sandi Morris	United States	10 June 2018	2018	
Long jump	7.05 m (+0.7 m/s)	Galina Chistyakova	Soviet Union	3 July 1989	1989	
Long jump	7.05 m (+1.3 m/s)	Tara Davis-Woodhall	United States	15 June 2025	2025	
Triple jump	14.83 m (+1.9 m/s)	Caterine Ibargüen	Colombia	29 July 2011	2011	
Shot put	20.89 m	Jessica Schilder	Netherlands	7 June 2026	2026	
Discus throw	68.77 m	Sandra Perković	Croatia	17 August 2012	2012	
Javelin throw	72.74 m (old design)	Petra Felke-Meier	East Germany	1 July 1986	1986	
Javelin throw	68.59 m (current design)	Mariya Abakumova	Russia	22 August 2013	2013	
4 × 100 m relay	42.13	Géraldine Frey; Mujinga Kambundji; Salomé Kora; Ajla del Ponte	Switzerland	30 June 2022	2022	
