= 2019 Bauhausgalan =

- Dates: 30 May 2019
- Host city: Stockholm, Sweden
- Venue: Stockholm Olympic Stadium
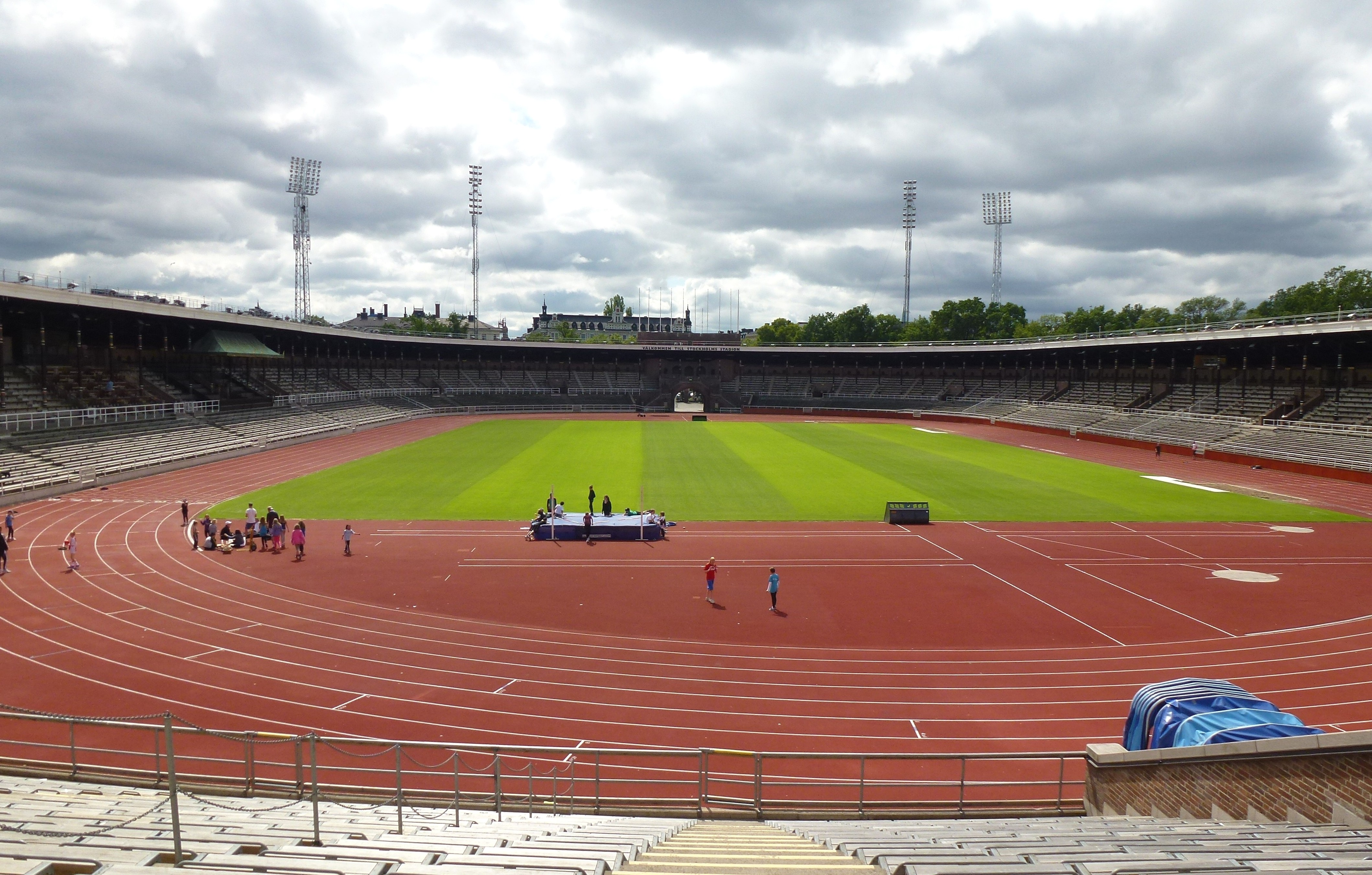
- Level: 2019 IAAF Diamond League
- Events: 38 (13 Diamond League)

The 2019 Bauhausgalan was the 53rd edition of the annual outdoor track and field meeting in Stockholm, Sweden. Held on 30 May at Stockholm Olympic Stadium, it was the third leg of the 2019 IAAF Diamond League – the highest level international track and field circuit. 38 events were contested with 13 of them being point-scoring Diamond League disciplines.

== Diamond League results ==
Athletes competing in the Diamond League disciplines earned extra compensation and points which went towards qualifying for one of two Diamond League finals (either Zürich or Brussels depending on the discipline). First place earned eight points, with each step down in place earning one less point than the previous, until no points are awarded in ninth place or lower.

=== Men ===
200 m (+1.0 m/s)
Place	Athlete	Time	Points
1	Aaron Brown (CAN)	20.06	14 (+8)
2	Ramil Guliyev (TUR)	20.40	15 (+7)
3	Jereem Richards (TTO)	20.45	11 (+6)
4	Álex Quiñónez (ECU)	20.56	12 (+5)
5	Bernardo Baloyes (COL)	20.74	4 (+4)
6	Henrik Larsson (SWE)	20.81 PB	3 (+3)
7	Kyle Greaux (TTO)	20.87	2 (+2)
8	Alonso Edward (PAN)	20.88	5 (+1)

400 m
Place	Athlete	Time	Points
1	Michael Norman (USA)	44.53	8 (+8)
2	Rai Benjamin (USA)	45.13	7 (+7)
3	Michael Cherry (USA)	46.30	13 (+6)
4	Vernon Norwood (USA)	46.39	5 (+5)
5	Luka Janežič (SLO)	46.60	4 (+4)
6	Nathan Strother (USA)	46.64	9 (+3)
7	Bralon Taplin (GRN)	46.87	6 (+2)
8	Baboloki Thebe (BOT)	48.85	1 (+1)

1500 m
Place	Athlete	Time	Points
1	Timothy Cheruiyot (KEN)	3:35.79	15 (+8)
2	Ayanleh Souleiman (DJI)	3:37.30	7 (+7)
3	Jakob Ingebrigtsen (NOR)	3:37.30	6 (+6)
4	Bethwell Birgen (KEN)	3:39.18	11 (+5)
5	Samuel Tefera (ETH)	3:40.19	4 (+4)
6	Charles Cheboi Simotwo (KEN)	3:40.65	7 (+3)
7	Aman Wote (ETH)	3:42.68	2 (+2)
8	George Meitamei Manangoi (KEN)	3:43.83	3 (+1)
9	Henrik Ingebrigtsen (NOR)	3:45.46	0
10	Elijah Motonei Manangoi (KEN)	3:48.83	8
11	Elmar Engholm (SWE)	3:50.12	0
DNF	Brahim Kaazouzi (MAR)	Did not finish	1
DNF (PM)	Timothy Sein (KEN)	Did not finish (pace maker)	0
DNF (PM)	Cornelius Tuwei (KEN)	Did not finish (pace maker)	0

400 m hurdles
Place	Athlete	Time	Points
1	Karsten Warholm (NOR)	47.85	8 (+8)
2	TJ Holmes (USA)	49.25	7 (+7)
3	Thomas Barr (IRL)	50.28	12 (+6)
4	Sebastian Rodger (GBR)	50.50	5 (+5)
5	Kenneth Selmon (USA)	51.15	4 (+4)
6	Jacob Paul (GBR)	51.29	3 (+3)
7	Carl Bengtström (SWE)	51.35	2 (+2)
8	Abdelmalik Lahoulou (ALG)	51.82	1 (+1)

Pole vault
Place	Athlete	Mark	Points
1	Sam Kendricks (USA)	5.72 m	16 (+8)
2	Piotr Lisek (POL)	5.60 m	12 (+7)
3	Seito Yamamoto (JPN)	5.48 m	12 (+6)
4	Emmanouil Karalis (GRE)	5.36 m	5 (+5)
5	Raphael Holzdeppe (GER)	5.36 m	4 (+4)
5	Paweł Wojciechowski (POL)	5.36 m	4 (+4)
NM	Thiago Braz da Silva (BRA)	No mark	7
NM	Konstantinos Filippidis (GRE)	No mark	2

Long jump
Rang	Athlete	Mark	Points
1	Thobias Montler (SWE)	8.22 m (+1.5 m/s) PB	8 (+8)
2	Juan Miguel Echevarría (CUB)	8.12 m (+2.3 m/s)	7 (+7)
3	Jeff Henderson (USA)	8.09 m (+1.2 m/s)	6 (+6)
4	Luvo Manyonga (RSA)	8.07 m (+2.9 m/s)	5 (+5)
5	Tajay Gayle (JAM)	8.05 m (+2.3 m/s)	12 (+4)
6	Miltiadis Tentoglou (GRE)	7.99 m (+6.0 m/s)	7 (+3)
7	Serhiy Nykyforov (UKR)	7.97 m (+0.1 m/s)	2 (+2)
8	Zarck Visser (RSA)	7.77 m (+3.9 m/s)	4 (+1)
9	Andreas Otterling (SWE)	7.70 m (+1.4 m/s)	0

Discus throw
Place	Athlete	Mark	Points
1	Daniel Ståhl (SWE)	69.57 m	16 (+8)
2	Fedrick Dacres (JAM)	68.96 m	7 (+7)
3	Lukas Weisshaidinger (AUT)	66.97 m	13 (+6)
4	Ola Stunes Isene (NOR)	66.65 m	6 (+5)
5	Ehsan Hadadi (IRI)	65.34 m	10 (+4)
6	Christoph Harting (GER)	62.88 m	7 (+3)
7	Mason Finley (USA)	62.16 m	4 (+2)
8	Simon Pettersson (SWE)	61.50 m	1 (+1)

=== Female ===
200 m (+1.3 m/s)
Place	Athlete	Time	Points
1	Dina Asher-Smith (GBR)	22.18 WL	16 (+8)
2	Elaine Thompson (JAM)	22.66	7 (+7)
3	Dafne Schippers (NED)	22.78	6 (+6)
4	Ivet Lalova-Collio (BUL)	22.99	5 (+5)
5	Jenna Prandini (USA)	23.09	4 (+4)
6	Crystal Emmanuel (CAN)	23.14	3 (+3)
7	Jamile Samuel (NED)	23.25	9 (+2)
8	Irene Ekelund (SWE)	23.77	1 (+1)

800 m
Place	Athlete	Time	Points
1	Ajeé Wilson (USA)	2:00.87	14 (+8)
2	Habitam Alemu (ETH)	2:01.26	9 (+7)
3	Nelly Jepkosgei (KEN)	2:01.98	11 (+6)
4	Raevyn Rogers (USA)	2:02.35	9 (+5)
5	Lovisa Lindh (SWE)	2:02.95	4 (+4)
6	Renée Eykens (BEL)	2:03.34	3 (+3)
7	Lynsey Sharp (GBR)	2:03.52	2 (+2)
8	Hanna Hermansson (SWE)	2:03.70	1 (+1)
9	Natoya Goule (JAM)	2:03.89	1
DNF (PM)	Noélie Yarigo (BEN)	Did not finish (pace maker)	0

5000 m
Place	Athlete	Time	Points
1	Agnes Jebet Tirop (KEN)	14:50.82 WL	8 (+8)
2	Fantu Worku (ETH)	14:51.31 PB	7 (+7)
3	Lilian Kasait Rengeruk (KEN)	14:51.34	12 (+6)
4	Gabriela DeBues-Stafford (CAN)	14:51.59 NR	5 (+5)
5	Caroline Chepkoech Kipkirui (KEN)	14:52.05	8 (+4)
6	Margaret Chelimo Kipkemboi (KEN)	14:52.11	3 (+3)
7	Eilish McColgan (GBR)	14:52.40	2 (+2)
8	Melissa Courtney (GBR)	14:53.82 PB	1 (+1)
9	Yasemin Can (TUR)	14:53.92	1
10	Gloriah Kite (KEN)	14:56.50 PB	3
11	Alina Reh (GER)	15:04.10 PB	0
12	Hellen Obiri (KEN)	15:07.70	8
13	Anna Emilie Møller (NOR)	15:22.69 PB	0
DNF	Liv Westphal (FRA)	Did not finish	0
DNF (PM)	Loice Chemnung (KEN)	Did not finish (pace maker)	0
DNF (PM)	Mary Kuria (KEN)	Did not finish (pace maker)	0

100 m hurdles (+1.3 m/s)
Place	Athlete	Time	Points
1	Kendra Harrison (USA)	12.52	8 (+8)
2	Sharika Nelvis (USA)	12.69	13 (+7)
3	Tobi Amusan (NGR)	12.85	13 (+6)
4	Cindy Roleder (GER)	12.94	5 (+5)
5	Elvira Herman (BLR)	12.94	7 (+4)
6	Pedrya Seymour (BAH)	12.97	3 (+3)
7	Eefje Boons (NED)	13.32	2 (+2)
8	Nadine Visser (NED)	13.39	1 (+1)

High jump
Place	Athlete	Mark	Points
1	Mariya Lasitskene (RUS)	1.92 m	8 (+8)
2	Yuliya Levchenko (UKR)	1.90 m	7 (+7)
3	Erika Kinsey (SWE)	1.90 m	13 (+6)
4	Yaroslava Mahuchikh (UKR)	1.83 m	13 (+5)
5	Mirela Demireva (BUL)	1.83 m	11 (+4)
5	Sofie Skoog (SWE)	1.83 m	4 (+4)
7	Marie-Laurence Jungfleisch (GER)	1.78 m	2 (+2)
7	Elena Vallortigara (ITA)	1.78 m	4 (+2)
9	Levern Spencer (LCA)	1.78 m	4

Discus throw
Place	Athlete	Mark	Points
1	Denia Caballero (CUB)	65.10 m	8 (+8)
2	Yaime Pérez (CUB)	65.09 m	7 (+7)
3	Chen Yang (CHN)	64.25 m	6 (+6)
4	Feng Bin (CHN)	63.87 m	5 (+5)
5	Sandra Perković (CRO)	63.71 m	4 (+4)
6	Valarie Allman (USA)	63.45 m	3 (+3)
7	Andressa de Morais (BRA)	61.86 m	2 (+2)
8	Mélina Robert-Michon (FRA)	59.63 m	1 (+1)
9	Vanessa Kamga (SWE)	57.54 m	0

== See also ==
- 2019 Weltklasse Zürich (first half of the Diamond League final)
- 2019 Memorial Van Damme (second half of the Diamond League final)
