= Heinz Georg Baus =

German entrepreneur (1934–2016)

- Born: 25 February 1934; Heidelberg, Germany
- Died: 10 May 2016 (aged 82)
- Occupations: Owner, Bauhaus AG
- Children: Bernd Baus

Heinz Georg Baus (25 February 1934 – 10 May 2016) was a German billionaire and the owner of the home improvement retail chain Bauhaus AG. In March 2016, Forbes estimated his net worth at US$3.8 billion.

== Early life ==
Baus was born in Heidelberg, Germany on 25 February 1934 and grew up in Schriesheim in the Baden region of Germany. His parents, Georg and Katharina Baus, ran a carpentry workshop there, where he completed an apprenticeship as a carpenter and glazier. He later trained as a ventilation mechanic and graduated from a higher commercial school. Baus trained as a carpenter.

During a trip to the United States he became aware of the emerging do-it-yourself trend.

Inspired by the first American home improvement stores, he founded the Bauhaus Gesellschaft für Bau- und Hausbedarf together with his father in 1959 and opened the first Bauhaus self-service specialist store on 9 April 1960.

The store located in the U3 square in Mannheim is considered the first DIY store in Germany.

Five years later he opened a second branch in Heidelberg. Additional stores initially followed in the Rhine–Neckar region and later throughout Germany, including West Berlin. By 1970 the chain had grown to ten stores.

In 1969 Baus moved the company headquarters and his residence to Switzerland. The Bauhaus holding company established its headquarters in Zug, while Baus moved to Thun in the Canton of Bern. He later lived with his family for several years in Monaco.

From 1970 onward, Baus led the family-owned company as chairman of the board of directors of Interbauhaus AG. Day-to-day operational management, however, continued to be directed from Mannheim.

In the following decades Baus internationalized the company. From 1972 he established numerous national subsidiaries and branches, initially in Austria and later in several Western European and Scandinavian countries as well as in Southeastern Europe.

Inspired by the U.S. retailer The Home Depot, he added the suffix “The Home Store” to his company’s branches in the late 1990s, a designation that remained in use until a court decision in 2007 following an injunction.

Around the turn of the millennium, Baus moved his residence from Switzerland to the tax haven of Monaco.

In 2015 Baus founded the Heinz Baus Privatstiftung. The purpose of the foundation, based in Linz, is to “secure and preserve the Bauhaus Group as a family-owned company”.

At that time the company operated more than 260 branches in 19 European countries and generated annual revenue of six billion euros.

The chairman of the board of directors and successor to Heinz Georg Baus is the lawyer Peter Lutz. According to manager magazin, Baus left behind “not only a complex corporate structure with branches extending to the Caribbean”, but also “complicated” family relations.

Another company founded by Baus is the bathroom fittings manufacturer Duscholux, where he distinguished himself as the patent holder of several shower door components.

Baus opened the first Bauhaus store in Mannheim in 1960. There are now 250 stores and 17,000 employees in 17 countries across Europe.

== Personal life ==
He was married with one son, Bernd Baus, who is a managing director at Bauhaus. He lived in Monaco.

Baus died on 10 May 2016.
