= 2022 Bauhausgalan =

- Dates: 30 June 2022
- Host city: Stockholm, Sweden
- Venue: Stockholm Olympic Stadium
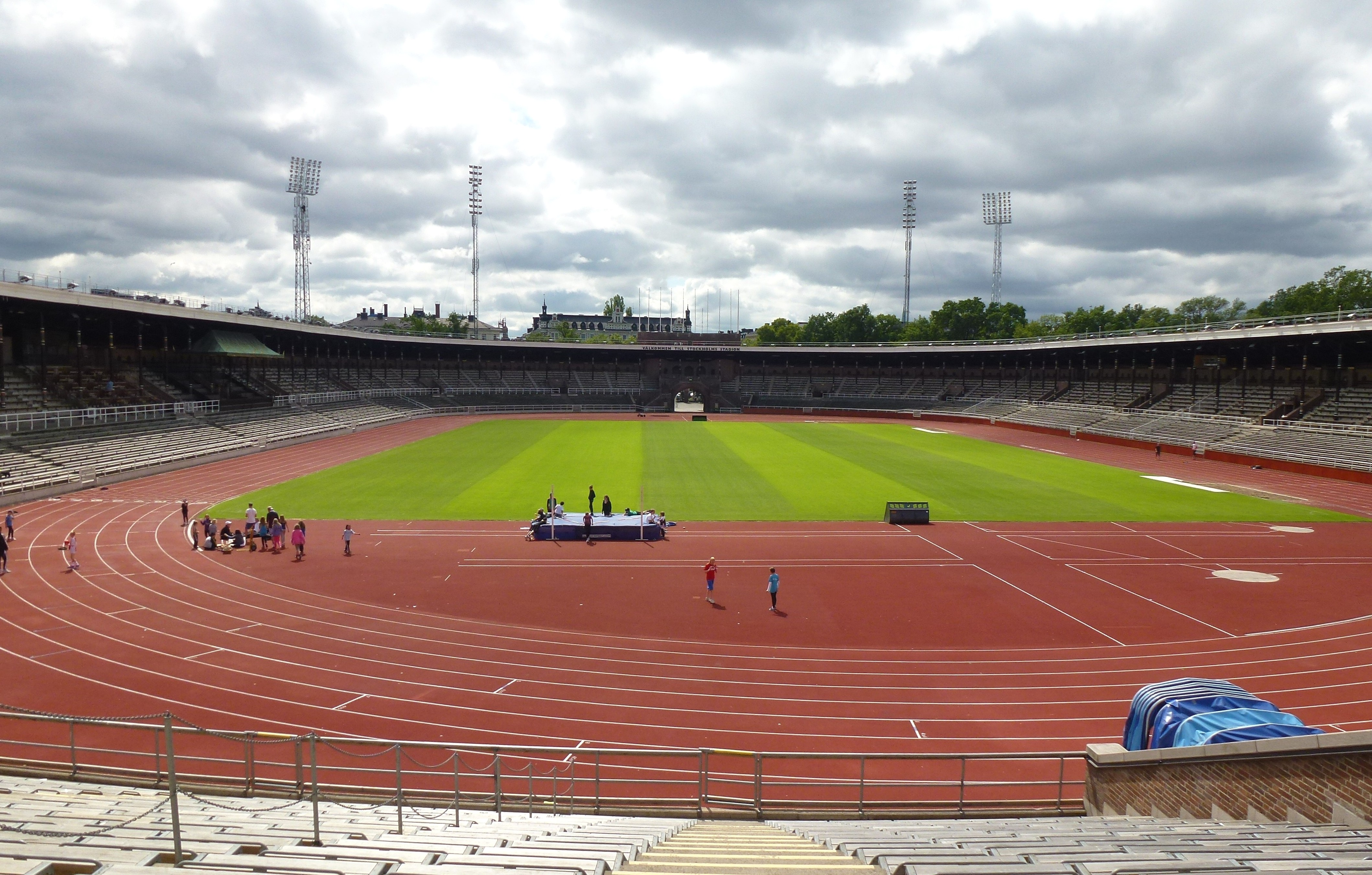
- Level: 2022 Diamond League

The 2022 Bauhausgalan was the 56th edition of the annual outdoor track and field meeting in Stockholm, Sweden. Held on 30 June at Stockholm Olympic Stadium, it was the fifth leg of the 2022 Diamond League – the highest level international track and field circuit.

The meeting was highlighted by Mondo Duplantis breaking the outdoor world best in the pole vault, with a 6.16 metres clearance.

In the 400 metres hurdles, Femke Bol set a Diamond League record of 52.27 to win the women's race. The most surprising victory came in the men's 3000 metres, as Dominic Lobalu formerly of the Athlete Refugee Team beat half marathon world-record-holder Jacob Kiplimo in 7:29.

== Results ==
Athletes competing in the Diamond League disciplines earned extra compensation and points which went towards qualifying the Diamond League finals in Zürich. First place earned eight points, with each step down in place earning one less point than the previous, until no points are awarded in ninth place or lower.

=== Diamond Discipline ===
Men's 100m (−0.5 m/s)
Place	Athlete	Country	Time	Points
1st place, gold medalist(s)	Akani Simbine	South Africa	10.02	8
2nd place, silver medalist(s)	Reece Prescod	Great Britain	10.15	7
3rd place, bronze medalist(s)	Jimmy Vicaut	France	10.19	6
4	Yupun Abeykoon	Sri Lanka	10.21	5
5	Mouhamadou Fall	France	10.24	4
6	Joris van Gool	Netherlands	10.38	3
7	Rohan Browning	Australia	10.38	2
8	Henrik Larsson	Sweden	10.40	1

Men's 800m
Place	Athlete	Country	Time	Points
1st place, gold medalist(s)	Slimane Moula	Algeria	1:44.60	8
2nd place, silver medalist(s)	Benjamin Robert	France	1:45.11	7
3rd place, bronze medalist(s)	Gabriel Tual	France	1:45.29	6
4	Andreas Kramer	Sweden	1:45.42	5
5	Emmanuel Korir	Kenya	1:45.85	4
6	Adrián Ben	Spain	1:45.85	3
7	Collins Kipruto	Kenya	1:45.86	2
8	Ferguson Rotich	Kenya	1:48.05	1
	Khalid Benmahdi	Algeria	DNF	

Men's 3000m
Place	Athlete	Country	Time	Points
1st place, gold medalist(s)	Dominic Lokinyomo Lobalu	South Sudan	7:29.48	8
2nd place, silver medalist(s)	Jacob Kiplimo	Uganda	7:29.55	7
3rd place, bronze medalist(s)	Cornelius Kemboi	Kenya	7:31.26	6
4	Stewart McSweyn	Australia	7:31.93	5
5	Thierry Ndikumwenayo	Burundi	7:34.91	4
6	Luis Grijalva	Guatemala	7:38.67	3
7	Mike Foppen	Netherlands	7:43.37	2
8	Narve Gilje Nordås	Norway	7:44.28	1
9	Jack Rayner	Australia	7:47.62	
10	Ryuji Miura	Japan	7:47.98	
11	Addisu Yihune	Ethiopia	7:48.51	
	Mounir Akbache	France	DNF	
	Boaz Kiprugut	Kenya	DNF	
	Adel Mechaal	Spain	DNF	

Men's 400mH
Place	Athlete	Country	Time	Points
1st place, gold medalist(s)	Alison dos Santos	Brazil	46.80	8
2nd place, silver medalist(s)	CJ Allen	United States	48.28	7
3rd place, bronze medalist(s)	Kyron McMaster	British Virgin Islands	48.58	6
4	Rasmus Mägi	Estonia	48.77	5
5	Carl Bengtström	Sweden	48.97	4
6	Julien Watrin	Belgium	49.01	3
7	Chris McAlister	Great Britain	49.76	2
8	Sokwakhana Zazini	South Africa	49.80	1

Men's Pole Vault
Place	Athlete	Country	Mark	Points
1st place, gold medalist(s)	Armand Duplantis	Sweden	6.16 m	8
2nd place, silver medalist(s)	Chris Nilsen	United States	5.93 m	7
3rd place, bronze medalist(s)	Thiago Braz	Brazil	5.93 m	6
4	Pål Haugen Lillefosse	Norway	5.83 m	5
5	Renaud Lavillenie	France	5.83 m	4
6	EJ Obiena	Philippines	5.73 m	3
7	Ben Broeders	Belgium	5.63 m	2
8	Sondre Guttormsen	Norway	5.63 m	1

Men's Discus Throw
Place	Athlete	Country	Mark	Points
1st place, gold medalist(s)	Kristjan Čeh	Slovenia	70.02 m	8
2nd place, silver medalist(s)	Mykolas Alekna	Lithuania	69.81 m	7
3rd place, bronze medalist(s)	Daniel Ståhl	Sweden	67.57 m	6
4	Andrius Gudžius	Lithuania	67.37 m	5
5	Sam Mattis	United States	63.69 m	4
6	Lawrence Okoye	Great Britain	63.34 m	3
7	Simon Pettersson	Sweden	63.21 m	2
8	Matthew Denny	Australia	62.49 m	1

Men's Javelin Throw
Place	Athlete	Country	Mark	Points
1st place, gold medalist(s)	Anderson Peters	Grenada	90.31 m	8
2nd place, silver medalist(s)	Neeraj Chopra	India	89.94 m	7
3rd place, bronze medalist(s)	Julian Weber	Germany	89.08 m	6
4	Jakub Vadlejch	Czech Republic	88.59 m	5
5	Oliver Helander	Finland	85.46 m	4
6	Kim Amb	Sweden	82.86 m	3
7	Vítězslav Veselý	Czech Republic	82.57 m	2
8	Andrian Mardare	Moldova	81.96 m	1

Women's 200m (+0.1 m/s)
Place	Athlete	Country	Time	Points
1st place, gold medalist(s)	Dina Asher-Smith	Great Britain	22.37	8
2nd place, silver medalist(s)	Mujinga Kambundji	Switzerland	22.37	7
3rd place, bronze medalist(s)	Ida Karstoft	Denmark	22.90	6
4	Tynia Gaither	Bahamas	23.06	5
5	Gina Bass	Gambia	23.31	4
6	Ajla Del Ponte	Switzerland	23.41	3
7	Julia Henriksson	Sweden	23.57	2
8	Lisa Lilja	Sweden	23.78	1

Women's 800m
Place	Athlete	Country	Time	Points
1st place, gold medalist(s)	Mary Moraa	Kenya	1:57.68	8
2nd place, silver medalist(s)	Keely Hodgkinson	Great Britain	1:58.18	7
3rd place, bronze medalist(s)	Catriona Bisset	Australia	1:58.54	6
4	Halimah Nakaayi	Uganda	1:58.85	5
5	Sage Hurta	United States	1:58.95	4
6	Prudence Sekgodiso	South Africa	1:59.52	3
7	Brooke Feldmeier	United States	1:59.73	2
8	Hedda Hynne	Norway	2:02.09	1
9	Lovisa Lindh	Sweden	2:03.22	
	Sarah Billings	Australia	DNF	

Women's 100mH (−0.5 m/s)
Place	Athlete	Country	Time	Points
1st place, gold medalist(s)	Jasmine Camacho-Quinn	Puerto Rico	12.46	8
2nd place, silver medalist(s)	Tobi Amusan	Nigeria	12.50	7
3rd place, bronze medalist(s)	Nia Ali	United States	12.53	6
4	Danielle Williams	Jamaica	12.59	5
5	Devynne Charlton	Bahamas	12.65	4
6	Nadine Visser	Netherlands	12.76	3
7	Pia Skrzyszowska	Poland	12.91	2
8	Tia Jones	United States	12.98	1

Women's 400mH
Place	Athlete	Country	Time	Points
1st place, gold medalist(s)	Femke Bol	Netherlands	52.27	8
2nd place, silver medalist(s)	Rushell Clayton	Jamaica	53.90	7
3rd place, bronze medalist(s)	Anna Ryzhykova	Ukraine	54.33	6
4	Ayomide Folorunso	Italy	54.66	5
5	Viktoriya Tkachuk	Ukraine	54.72	4
6	Viivi Lehikoinen	Finland	54.80	3
7	Jessie Knight	Great Britain	54.89	2
8	Cassandra Tate	United States	56.68	1

Women's 3000mSC
Place	Athlete	Country	Time	Points
1st place, gold medalist(s)	Daisy Jepkemei	Kazakhstan	9:15.77	8
2nd place, silver medalist(s)	Alice Finot	France	9:19.59	7
3rd place, bronze medalist(s)	Chiara Scherrer	Switzerland	9:24.16	6
4	Nataliya Strebkova	Ukraine	9:24.54	5
5	Lea Meyer	Germany	9:25.61	4
6	Fancy Cherono	Kenya	9:34.61	3
7	Elena Burkard	Germany	9:40.67	2
8	Gesa Felicitas Krause	Germany	9:44.44	1
9	Patrycja Kapała	Poland	9:45.21	
10	Emilia Lillemo	Sweden	9:46.97	
	Rosefline Chepngetich	Kenya	DNF	

Women's High Jump
Place	Athlete	Country	Mark	Points
1st place, gold medalist(s)	Eleanor Patterson	Australia	1.96 m	8
2nd place, silver medalist(s)	Yuliya Levchenko	Ukraine	1.93 m	7
3rd place, bronze medalist(s)	Iryna Herashchenko	Ukraine	1.93 m	6
4	Nadezhda Dubovitskaya	Kazakhstan	1.93 m	5
5	Yaroslava Mahuchikh	Ukraine	1.89 m	4
6	Elena Vallortigara	Italy	1.89 m	3
7	Ella Junnila	Finland	1.85 m	2
8	Kateryna Tabashnyk	Ukraine	1.85 m	1

Women's Long Jump
Place	Athlete	Country	Mark	Points
1st place, gold medalist(s)	Lorraine Ugen	Great Britain	6.81 m (−0.8 m/s)	8
2nd place, silver medalist(s)	Maryna Bekh-Romanchuk	Ukraine	6.76 m (−1.1 m/s)	7
3rd place, bronze medalist(s)	Khaddi Sagnia	Sweden	6.74 m (±0.0 m/s)	6
4	Agate de Sousa	São Tomé and Príncipe	6.73 m (−0.8 m/s)	5
5	Malaika Mihambo	Germany	6.72 m (−0.4 m/s)	4
6	Ivana Španović	Serbia	6.66 m (−0.7 m/s)	3
7	Ese Brume	Nigeria	6.57 m (−0.6 m/s)	2
8	Jazmin Sawyers	Great Britain	6.39 m (−0.2 m/s)	1
9	Maja Åskag	Sweden	6.31 m (−0.1 m/s)	

Women's Shot Put
Place	Athlete	Country	Mark	Points
1st place, gold medalist(s)	Chase Ealey	United States	20.48 m	8
2nd place, silver medalist(s)	Sarah Mitton	Canada	19.90 m	7
3rd place, bronze medalist(s)	Auriol Dongmo	Portugal	19.30 m	6
4	Jessica Schilder	Netherlands	19.07 m	5
5	Danniel Thomas-Dodd	Jamaica	18.77 m	4
6	Jessica Ramsey	United States	18.64 m	3
7	Fanny Roos	Sweden	18.34 m	2
8	Jessica Inchude	Portugal	17.29 m	1

=== Promotional Events ===
Men's Long Jump
Place	Athlete	Country	Mark
1st place, gold medalist(s)	Miltiadis Tentoglou	Greece	8.31 m (+1.7 m/s)
2nd place, silver medalist(s)	Thobias Montler	Sweden	7.98 m (−2.8 m/s)
3rd place, bronze medalist(s)	Filip Pravdica	Croatia	7.82 m (+2.4 m/s)
4	Jules Pommery	France	7.80 m (+0.3 m/s)
5	Héctor Santos	Spain	7.72 m (−1.8 m/s)
6	Gabriel Bitan	Romania	7.67 m (−0.5 m/s)
7	Reynold Banigo	Great Britain	7.63 m (−0.7 m/s)
8	Jean-Pierre Bertrand	France	7.39 m (−0.2 m/s)

Men's 4 × 100 m
Place	Athlete	Country	Time
1st place, gold medalist(s)	Elvis Afrifa; Taymir Burnet; Joris van Gool; Raphael Bouju	Netherlands	38.70
2nd place, silver medalist(s)	Simon Hansen; Frederik Schou-Nielsen; Tobias Larsen; Rasmus Thornbjerg Klausen	Denmark	39.26
3rd place, bronze medalist(s)	Eino Vuori; Samuli Samuelsson; Oskari Lehtonen; Samuel Purola	Finland	39.31
4	Pascal Mancini; Bradley Lestrade; Sylvain Chuard; Daniel Löhrer	Switzerland	39.40
5	Henri Sai; Karl Erik Nazarov; Lukas Lessel; Reimo Sepp	Estonia	39.57
6	Israel Olatunde; Mark Smyth; Colin Doyle; Joseph Ojewumi	Ireland	40.01
7	Amit Rutman; Blessing Afrifah; Aviv Koffler; Ishay Ifraimov	Israel	40.11
8	Arvid Wändesjö; Alexander Pilgrim; Isak Holgersson; Viktor Wall	Sweden	40.86

Women's 1500m
Place	Athlete	Country	Time
1st place, gold medalist(s)	Linden Hall	Australia	4:02.65
2nd place, silver medalist(s)	Winnie Nanyondo	Uganda	4:03.66
3rd place, bronze medalist(s)	Georgia Griffith	Australia	4:04.75
4	Águeda Marqués	Spain	4:07.51
5	Ellie Baker	Great Britain	4:08.63
6	Sarah Healy	Ireland	4:08.81
7	Klaudia Kazimierska	Poland	4:09.87
8	Viktória Wagner-Gyürkés	Hungary	4:09.88
9	Sarah Lahti	Sweden	4:14.43
10	Elisa Bortoli	Italy	4:15.91
11	Caterina Granz	Germany	4:16.28
	Jackie Baumann	Germany	DNF
	Ellie Sanford	Australia	DNF

Women's 4 × 100 m
Place	Athlete	Country	Time
1st place, gold medalist(s)	Géraldine Frey; Mujinga Kambundji; Salomé Kora; Ajla Del Ponte	Switzerland	42.13
2nd place, silver medalist(s)	Johanna Kylmänen; Aino Pulkkinen; Anniina Kortetmaa; Anna Pursiainen	Finland	43.90
3rd place, bronze medalist(s)	Lauren Roy; Sarah Leahy; Kate Doherty; Adeyemi Talabi	Ireland	44.25
4	Viktoria Willhuber; Susanne Gogl-Walli; Lena Pressler; Magdalena Lindner	Austria	44.33
5	Mette Graversgaard; Merel Kramer; Astrid Glenner-Frandsen; Emma Beiter Bomme	Denmark	44.46
	Nitzan Asas; Diana Vaisman; Alina Drutman; Eden Finkelstein	Israel	DQ
	Julia Henriksson; Daniella Busk; Lisa Lilja; Nora Lindahl	Sweden	DQ

Men's 1500m
Place	Athlete	Country	Time
1st place, gold medalist(s)	Filip Sasínek	Czech Republic	3:36.56
2nd place, silver medalist(s)	Matthew Stonier	Great Britain	3:36.60
3rd place, bronze medalist(s)	Ronald Musagala	Uganda	3:36.90
4	Matthew Ramsden	Australia	3:37.05
5	Samuel Pihlström	Sweden	3:37.23
6	Andrew Coscoran	Ireland	3:37.33
7	Kalle Berglund	Sweden	3:39.92
8	Jonathan Grahn	Sweden	3:40.29
9	Gustav Berlin	Sweden	3:40.37
10	Alexander Nilsson	Sweden	3:45.07
11	Abdelfath Yassin	Sweden	3:48.72
	Adam Czerwiński	Poland	DNF
	Ben Buckingham	Australia	DNF

Women's 400m
Place	Athlete	Country	Time
1st place, gold medalist(s)	Anna Kiełbasińska	Poland	50.60
2nd place, silver medalist(s)	Lieke Klaver	Netherlands	50.96
3rd place, bronze medalist(s)	Ama Pipi	Great Britain	51.80
4	Eveline Saalberg	Netherlands	52.92
5	Moa Hjelmer	Sweden	53.44
6	Linnéa Frobe	Sweden	54.87
7	Josephine Risberg Thoor	Sweden	55.39
8	Klara Helander	Sweden	55.45

=== National Events ===
Men's 800m
Place	Athlete	Country	Time
1st place, gold medalist(s)	Ben Pattison	Great Britain	1:46.06
2nd place, silver medalist(s)	John Fitzsimons	Ireland	1:46.80
3rd place, bronze medalist(s)	Jye Perrott	Australia	1:47.03
4	Felix Francois	Sweden	1:47.21
5	James Preston	New Zealand	1:48.29
6	Mohammed al-Suleimani	Oman	1:48.45
7	Joakim Andersson	Sweden	1:48.74
8	Habtom Asgede	Eritrea	1:50.56
9	Björn Seifert	Sweden	1:51.74
	Gergő Kiss	Hungary	DNF

Men's 400mH
Place	Athlete	Country	Time
1st place, gold medalist(s)	Jacob Paul	Great Britain	49.80
2nd place, silver medalist(s)	Sebastian Urbaniak	Poland	50.41
3rd place, bronze medalist(s)	Isak Andersson	Sweden	50.80
4	Martin Kučera	Slovakia	50.95
5	Anton Bertilsson	Sweden	51.50
6	Tuomas Lehtonen	Finland	51.72
7	Ludvig Hillenfjärd	Sweden	52.72
8	Gustav Karlsson	Sweden	54.23

Women's 800m
Place	Athlete	Country	Time
1st place, gold medalist(s)	Eveliina Määttänen	Finland	2:01.14
2nd place, silver medalist(s)	Adrianna Topolnicka	Poland	2:01.27
3rd place, bronze medalist(s)	McKenna Keegan	United States	2:03.47
4	Lova Perman	Sweden	2:05.58
5	Maria Freij	Sweden	2:07.37
6	Olivia Weslien	Sweden	2:08.56
7	Anna Silvander	Sweden	2:09.09
8	Elvira Bredin	Sweden	2:09.18
9	Saga Provci	Sweden	2:10.46

Women's 100mH (+0.8 m/s)
Place	Athlete	Country	Time
1st place, gold medalist(s)	Liz Clay	Australia	13.03
2nd place, silver medalist(s)	Zoë Sedney	Netherlands	13.08
3rd place, bronze medalist(s)	Mette Graversgaard	Denmark	13.11
4	Sarah Lavin	Ireland	13.13
5	Viktória Forster	Slovakia	13.63
6	Julia Wennersten	Sweden	13.85
7	Alva von Gerber	Sweden	14.10
8	Maria Södergren	Sweden	14.16

Women's 400mH
Place	Athlete	Country	Time
1st place, gold medalist(s)	Zenéy van der Walt	South Africa	54.99
2nd place, silver medalist(s)	Taylon Bieldt	South Africa	55.30
3rd place, bronze medalist(s)	Daniela Ledecká	Slovakia	56.19
4	Minna Svärd	Sweden	57.22
5	Izabela Smolińska	Poland	58.96
6	Hanna Karlsson	Sweden	59.10
7	Ebba Svantesson	Sweden	59.81
8	Lathifa Afrah	Sweden	1:01.01

== See also ==
- 2022 Weltklasse Zürich (Diamond League final)
