= 2005 IAAF Golden League =

Athletics competition series

The 2005 Golden League was the eighth edition of the IAAF's annual series of six athletics meets, held across Europe, with athletes having the chance to win the Golden League Jackpot of $1 million.

== Programme ==
Meet calendar
Meeting	Venue	Date
Meeting Gaz de France	Paris, France	1 July
Golden Gala	Rome, Italy	8 July
Bislett Games	Oslo, Norway	29 July
Weltklasse Zürich	Zürich, Switzerland	19 August
Memorial Van Damme	Brussels, Belgium	26 August
Internationales Stadionfest	Berlin, Germany	4 September

Jackpot events
Men	100 m	800 m	1500 m / 1 mile	110 m hurdles	High jump	Javelin throw
Women	100 m	800 m	3000 m / 5000 m	400 m hurdles	Triple jump	

== Results ==
=== Men ===
Event	Meeting Gaz de France Paris	Golden Gala Rome	Bislett Games Oslo	Weltklasse Zürich	Memorial van Damme Brussels	ISTAF Berlin
100 m	Aziz Zakari (GHA); 10.04	Justin Gatlin (USA); 9.96	Aziz Zakari (GHA); 10.02	Justin Gatlin (USA); 10.14	Justin Gatlin (USA); 9.99	Dwight Thomas (JAM); 10.01
200 m	-	-	-	-	-	Christopher Williams (JAM); 20.33
400 m	Tyler Christopher (CAN); 44.69	Tyree Washington (USA); 45.02	Gary Kikaya (COD); 44.81	Jeremy Wariner (USA); 44.67	Brandon Simpson (BHR); 44.70	-
800 m	William Yiampoy (KEN); 1:45.98	Alfred Kirwa Yego (KEN); 1:44.62	Mbulaeni Mulaudzi (RSA); 1:44.15	Antonio Manuel Reina (ESP); 1:44.32	Yuriy Borzakovskiy (RUS); 1:44.54	Mbulaeni Mulaudzi (RSA); 1:44.26
1500 m / 1 mile	Daniel Kipchirchir Komen (KEN); 3:30.01	Rashid Ramzi (BHR); 3:30.00	-	Daniel Kipchirchir Komen (KEN); 3:30.49	Daniel Kipchirchir Komen (KEN); 3:31.13	Daniel Kipchirchir Komen (KEN); 3:29.72
1500 m / 1 mile	-	-	Daham Najim Bashir (QAT); 3:47.97	-	-	-
3000 m	-	-	-	Kenenisa Bekele (ETH); 7:32.59	-	-
5000 m	Kenenisa Bekele (ETH); 12:40.18	Isaac Kiprono Songok (KEN); 12:52.29	John Kibowen (KEN); 13:07.74	-	Eliud Kipchoge (KEN); 12:50.22	-
10000 m	-	-	-	-	Kenenisa Bekele (ETH); 26:17.53 WR	-
3000 m steeplechase	Ezekiel Kemboi (KEN); 8:09.14	Saif Saaeed Shaheen (QAT); 7:56.34	-	Saif Saaeed Shaheen (QAT); 8:02.69	Saif Saaeed Shaheen (QAT); 7:55.51	-
110 m hurdles	Ladji Doucouré (FRA); 13.02	Dominique Arnold (USA); 13.11	Ladji Doucouré (FRA); 13.00	Dominique Arnold (USA); 13.03	Allen Johnson (USA); 13.16	Dominique Arnold (USA); 13.20
400 m hurdles	James Carter (USA); 48.05	James Carter (USA); 48.41	-	Bershawn Jackson (USA); 48.14	-	-
Long jump	-	Dwight Phillips (USA); 8.39	-	-	-	-
High jump	Stefan Holm (SWE); 2.32	Andriy Sokolovskyy (UKR); 2.38	Stefan Holm (SWE); 2.29	Svatoslav Ton (CZE); 2.28	Víctor Moya (CUB); 2.31	Yaroslav Rybakov (RUS); 2.32
Pole vault	Brad Walker (USA); 5.80	Toby Stevenson (USA); 5.81	-	Giuseppe Gibilisco (ITA); 5.70	-	Tim Lobinger (GER); 5.93
Discus throw	-	-	-	Virgilijus Alekna (LTU); 68.00	-	-
Shot put	-	-	-	-	-	Joachim Olsen (DEN); 21.10
Javelin throw	Tero Pitkämäki (FIN); 85.95	Andrus Värnik (EST); 85.50	Tero Pitkämäki (FIN); 90.54	Tero Pitkämäki (FIN); 88.71	Sergey Makarov (RUS); 86.88	Tero Pitkämäki (FIN); 89.32

=== Women ===
Event	Meeting Gaz de France Paris	Golden Gala Rome	Bislett Games Oslo	Weltklasse Zürich	Memorial van Damme Brussels	ISTAF Berlin
100 m	Christine Arron (FRA); 11.03	Christine Arron (FRA); 11.03	Christine Arron (FRA); 11.06	Veronica Campbell (JAM); 10.85	Christine Arron (FRA); 10.97	Christine Arron (FRA); 11.01
200 m	-	-	-	-	Cydonie Mothersille (CAY); 22.94	-
400 m	Tonique Williams-Darling (BAH); 49.69	Sanya Richards (USA); 49.82	-	Sanya Richards (USA); 48.92	-	-
800 m	Svetlana Cherkasova (RUS); 1:57.52	Hasna Benhassi (MAR); 1:58.41	Tatyana Andrianova (RUS); 1:56.91	Zulia Calatayud (CUB); 1:59.16	Mayte Martínez (ESP); 2:00.66	Zulia Calatayud (CUB); 1:59.25
1500 m	Olga Yegorova (RUS); 4:01.85	Mestawat Tadesse (ETH); 4:04.95	-	-	-	-
3000 m / 5000 m	Edith Masai (KEN); 8:31.27	-	Maryam Yusuf Jamal (BHR); 8:28.87	Maryam Yusuf Jamal (BHR); 8:29.45	-	-
3000 m / 5000 m	-	Tirunesh Dibaba (ETH); 14:32.57	-	-	Meseret Defar (ETH); 14:28.98	Berhane Adere (ETH); 14:47.56
100 m hurdles	Joanna Hayes (USA); 12.60	Anjanette Kirkland (USA); 12.57	-	Michelle Perry (USA); 12.55	-	Brigitte Foster-Hylton (JAM); 12.63
400 m hurdles	Lashinda Demus (USA); 53.85	Lashinda Demus (USA); 53.68	Sandra Glover (USA); 53.93	Yuliya Pechonkina (RUS); 53.30	Lashinda Demus (USA); 53.61	Sandra Glover (USA); 54.17
Long jump	-	-	-	-	Tatyana Kotova (RUS); 6.87	-
Triple jump	Tatyana Lebedeva (RUS); 15.11	Tatyana Lebedeva (RUS); 15.03	Tatyana Lebedeva (RUS); 14.89	Tatyana Lebedeva (RUS); 14.94	Tatyana Lebedeva (RUS); 14.94	Tatyana Lebedeva (RUS); 14.85
High jump	-	-	Amy Acuff (USA); 1.93	-	-	-
Pole vault	-	-	-	-	Yelena Isinbayeva (RUS); 4.93	-
Discus throw	-	-	-	-	-	Natalya Sadova (RUS); 64.20
Shot put	-	-	-	-	-	Nadine Kleinert (GER); 19.19
