= Bauhaus (company) =

European home improvement retail chain

- Type: Private
- Industry: Retail
- Founded: 1960; 66 years ago
- Founder: Heinz Georg Baus
- Headquarters: Belp, Bern, Switzerland
- Number of locations: 290+ (2026)
- Area served: Europe
- Revenue: 8,300,000,000 euro (2024)
- Number of employees: 29,600 (2024)
- Website: bauhaus.info

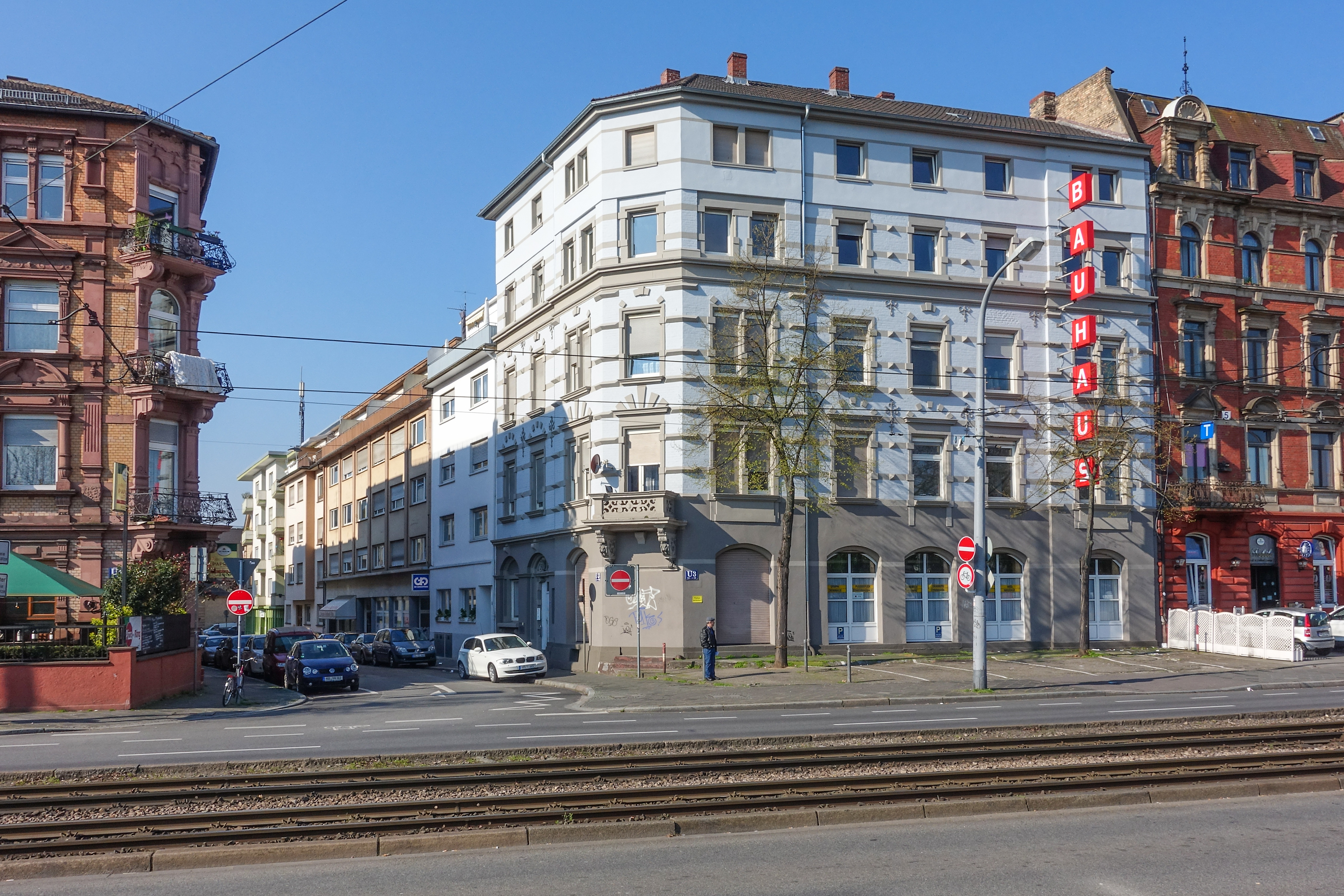
Home of the first Bauhaus store in Mannheim, Germany

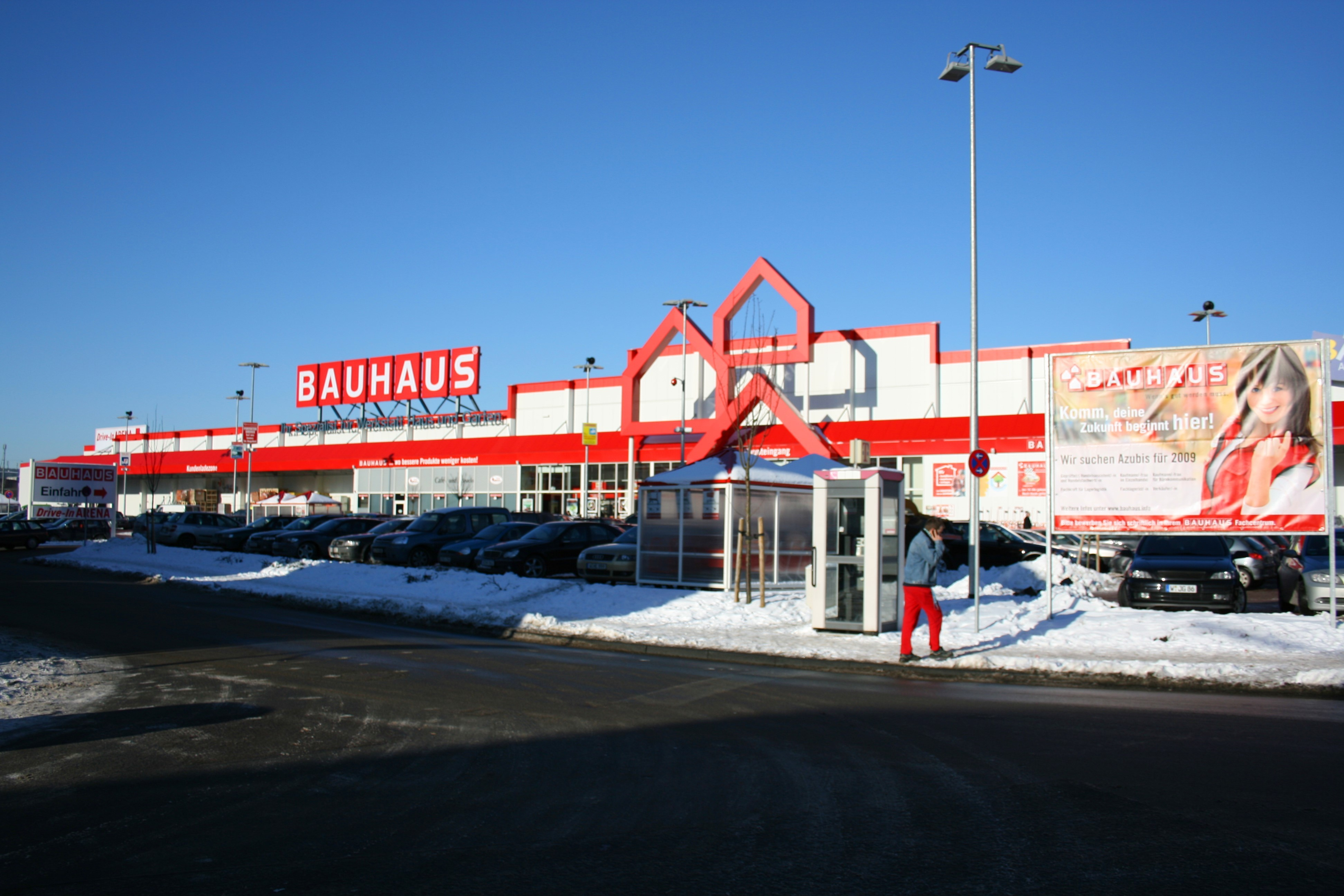
Bauhaus store in Wuppertal, Germany

Bauhaus is a European multinational home improvement retail company. It was founded in 1960 by Heinz Georg Baus in Mannheim, Germany, and is headquartered in Belp, Switzerland.

Bauhaus operates more than 290 stores in 19 European countries. More than half of them are located in Germany. Its next-largest markets by number of stores are Sweden, Austria, Denmark, and Spain.

== History ==
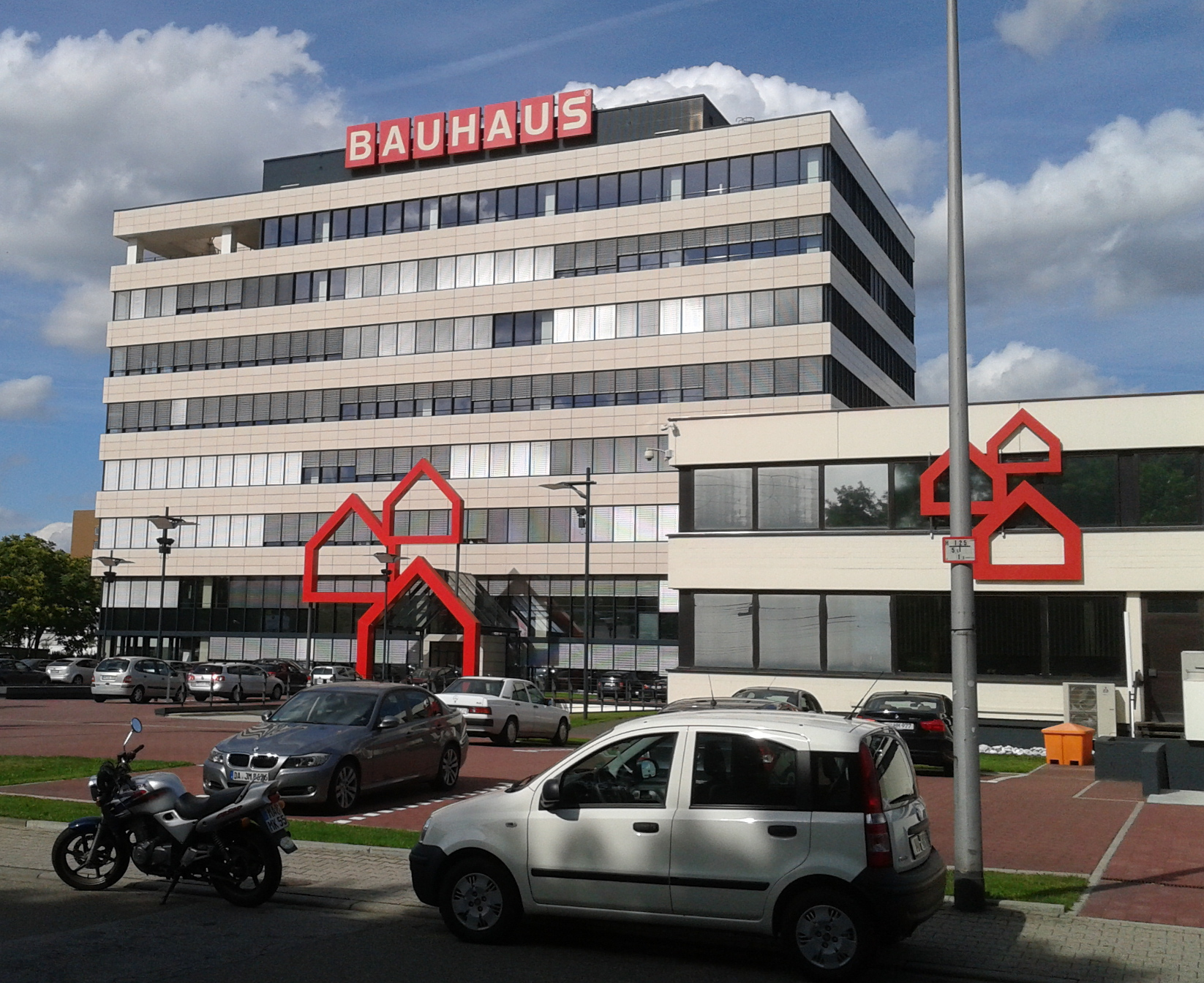
Bauhaus-Deutschland-Zentrale (Bauhaus Head Office in Germany) in Mannheim

The company was founded by Heinz-Georg Baus in 1960 based on the American model and was the first DIY store in Germany. "Anyone looking for tools or building materials had to go from specialist shops to other specialist shops. With its new-age concept Bauhaus enabled a more relaxed way of shopping, with everything available under one roof."

The first Bauhaus retail store was opened in Mannheim city centre, in "Quadrat U3", and had a sales area of 250 m². In addition to its range of roughly 25,000 products, which were originally available in self-service, Bauhaus offered customisable sizing for wooden panels, a delivery service and a customer car park directly in front of the entrance.

Bauhaus Mannheim was followed by branches that opened in Heidelberg and Karlsruhe, then in 1967 the first store opened in West Berlin. By the end of the 1960s there were 10 branches and in the 1970s there were already three times as many. From the start of the 1980s to the end of the 1990s this expansion was concentrated wholly on Germany, with 60 new branches being opened. The 100th branch opened in 1989 in the town of Flensburg.

In 1972, the first international Bauhaus opened in Austria. This was followed by further expansion in 1988 whereby the first Scandinavian store officially opened in Denmark, and in 1993 the first Bauhaus in Eastern Europe opened in the Czech Republic. As of January 2015 Bauhaus operates in 19 different countries with over 250 branches. To this day (January 2015) the German branch of Bauhaus (Service Center Deutschland) is based in Mannheim.

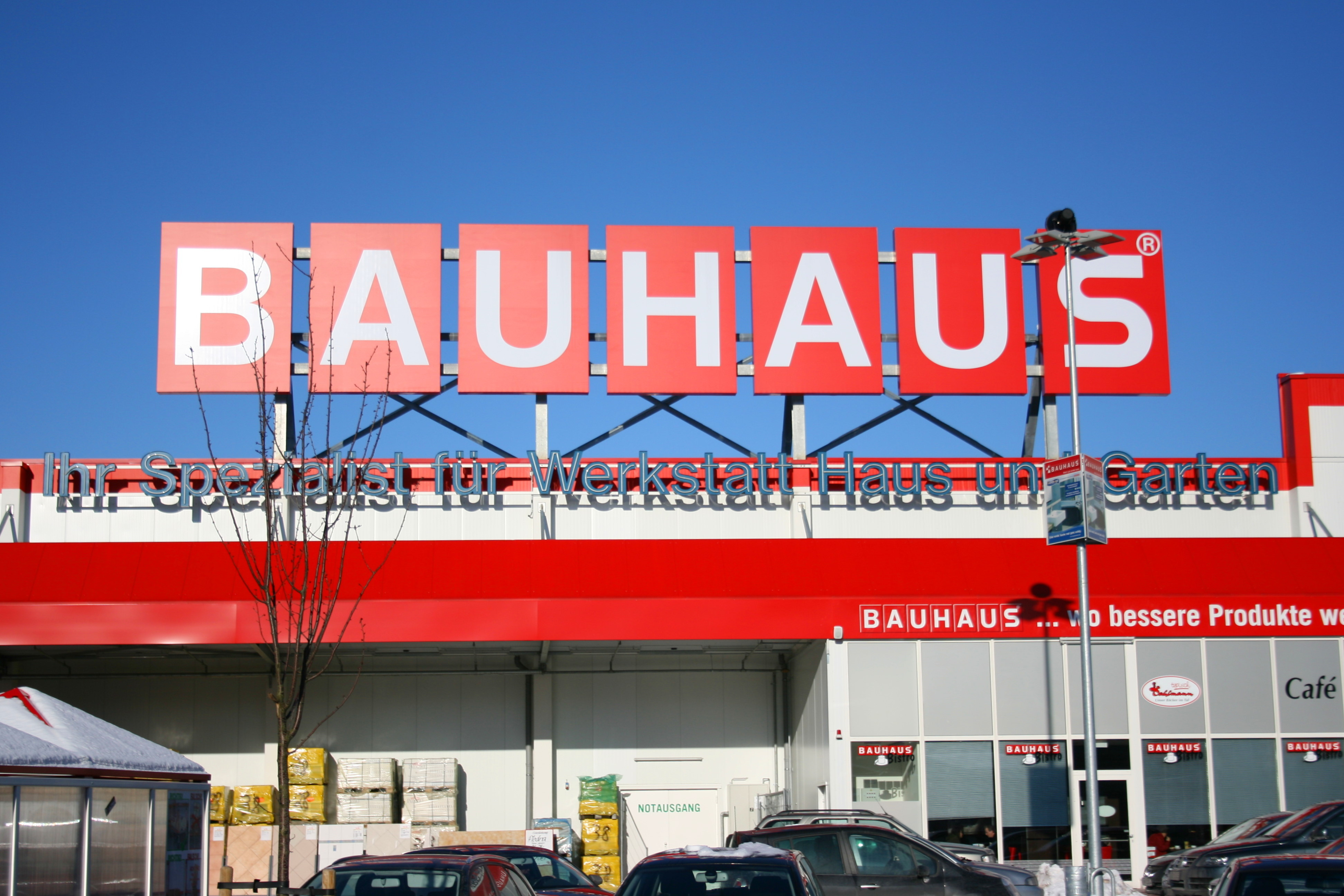
Typical Bauhaus Entrance

In the early 2000s, Bauhaus explored a potential partnership with the American DIY chain The Home Depot. However, these talks ultimately ended without any result. In 2007 a trademark dispute arose to which the Federal Court of Justice of Germany ruled that a decision made by the Higher Regional Court of Hamburg be rescinded, thus Bauhaus was forbidden from using a brand with the appendix "The Home Store".

At the end of 2004 Bauhaus as well as Praktiker, withdrew from the trade group "Deutsche Heimwerker-, Bau- und Gartenfachmärkte" (literally, the German DIY and Garden Stores trade group). Bauhaus also does not belong to an employer's association, so it is not governed by a tariff commitment. Ten of the 150 Bauhaus stores in Germany have a works council.

At the end of November 2013, it was announced that Bauhaus intended to acquire 24 Max Bahr branches, a German home improvement retailer with approximately 1300 employees. Max Bahr previously belonged to the Praktiker hardware store chain, and declared itself insolvent on 25 July 2013 due to Praktiker's insolvency. Alongside the 20 Max Bahr sites, four Praktiker sites were added.

In 2014, Bauhaus relocated its headquarters to Belp, Switzerland.

On March 30, 2020, it was announced that Bauhaus would take over the Bonn leisure markets of Knauber KG. The acquisition completed on July 1, 2020.

The largest hardware store in Europe, spanning over 30,000 m² of sales space, is the Bauhaus in Frechen near Cologne. It was initially opened in 1997 and has since undergone several expansions. As of April 2010, this position was previously held by the Bauhaus in Düsseldorf-Gerresheim, which boasted a sales area of 28,000 m².

== Organisation and ownership structure ==
In contrast to its competitors, namely Obi, Bauhaus distinguishes itself by its management structure. Unlike other hardware store chains, Bauhaus branches are not run as franchises but rather by regional companies.

Established as an unlisted stock corporation, Bauhaus was primarily owned by German billionaire Heinz G. Baus until his passing in 2016. Baus' family relocated from Mannheim to Lake Thun in the 1970s and the group is currently managed from the Swiss canton of Bern. Aside from the hardware retail chain, Baus was also the founder and operator of Duscholux, a bathroom outfitter with approximately 3,000 employees.

Since 2020, Bauhaus has been a member of the Association of German DIY, DIY and Garden Specialist Stores (BHB).

== Employees ==
As of 2013 Bauhaus had a workforce of 17,000 employees in 2013. By 2018, the company had over 34,500 employees.

== Store design ==
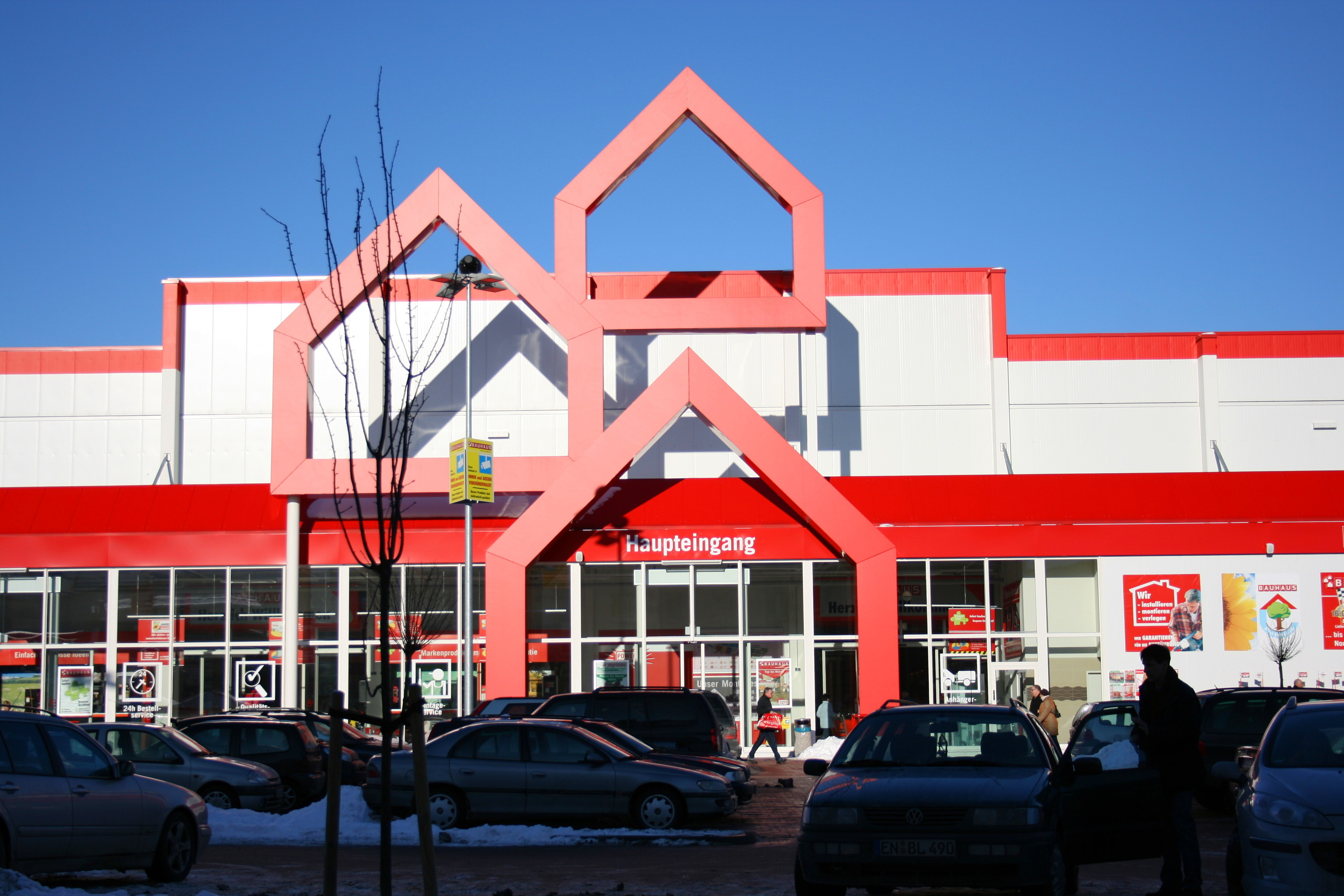
Bauhaus logo at the entrance of Wuppertal store

Since the early 1980s, the landmark of the facade design has been three connected houses. They are the official Bauhaus logo (the so-called “conglomerate”, from Latin, means “clustered together”) and in many places form the entrance portal of the branches. The current average sales area of the newly opened branches is 20,000 square meters with a mostly elongated facade shape. A wide central aisle divides the sales area and all departments are arranged along this axis.

Some of the hardware stores in Germany are located in historic railway workshop halls in cities such as Berlin, Hamburg,Munich.

== Controversy ==
In 2009, Monitor, an investigative German TV format produced by ARD, revealed that the Bauhaus management used the term "contaminated by works councils" (German: betriebsratsverseucht) to refer to chain stores with an active works council representing employees' interests. Subsequently, betriebsratsverseucht was chosen as the German Un-Word of the Year by a jury of linguistic scholars, who thus criticized the presumed inhuman attitude of the Bauhaus management towards its subordinates.

In 2013, Annemarie Jaegi, the director of the Bauhaus Archive, expressed concerns over the use and naming rights of the term "Bauhaus" by a hardware store chain. She argued that it was inappropriate for the company to claim ownership over a term widely recognized as representing a significant cultural movement. The Bauhaus Archive had attempted to challenge the trademark registered by the hardware store in 1960 through a lawsuit, but was unsuccessful in court in 1971.
