= Athletics at the 2020 Summer Olympics – Men's 1500 metres =

Men's 1500 metres at the Games of the XXXII Olympiad
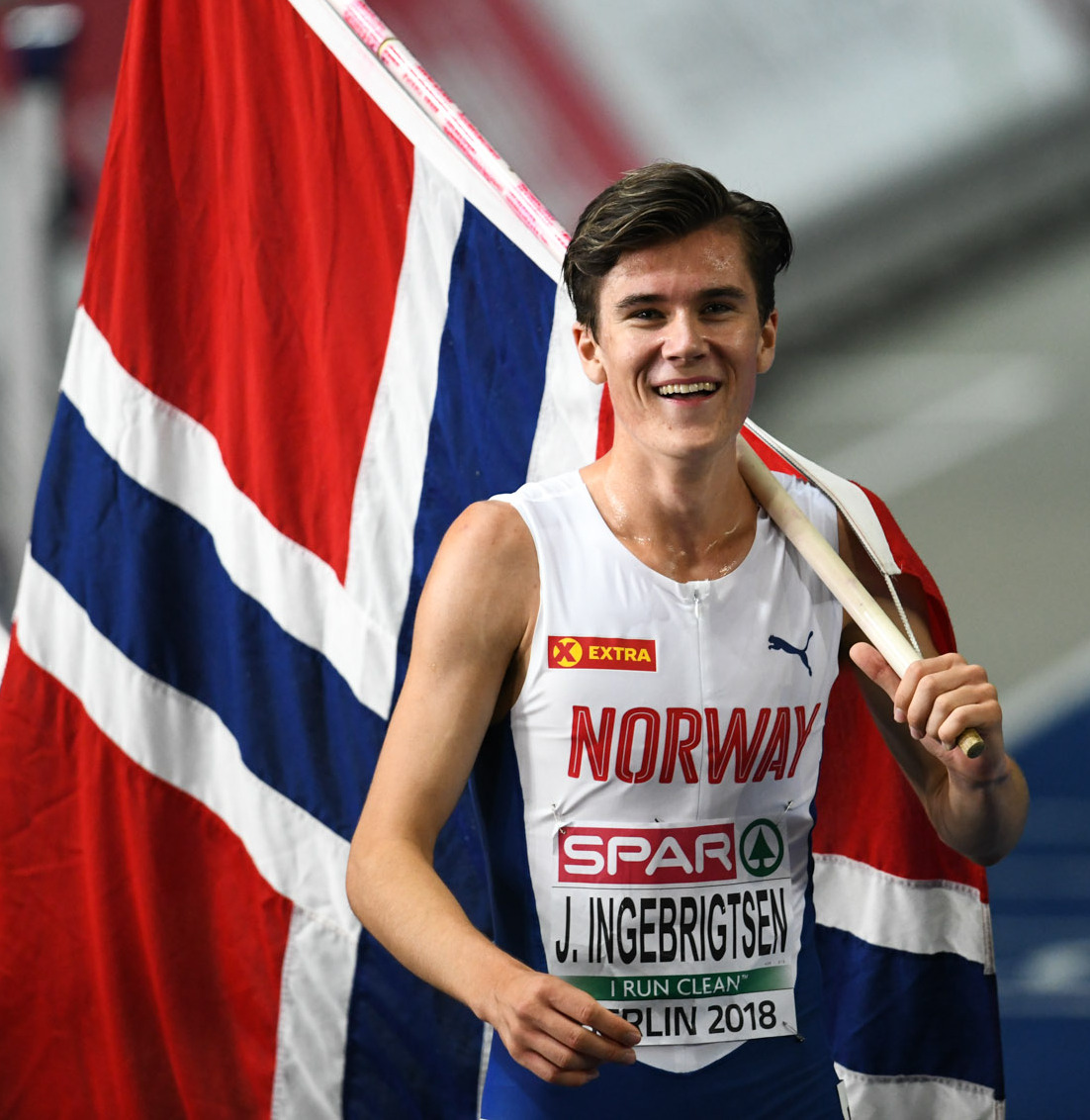
- Gold medalist Jakob Ingebrigtsen (shown at 2018 European Championship)
- Venue: Japan National Stadium
- Dates: 3 August 2021 (round 1); 5 August 2021 (semifinals); 7 August 2021 (final)
- Competitors: 47 from 27 nations
- Winning time: 3:28.32 OR

Medalists
1st place, gold medalist(s)		Jakob Ingebrigtsen	Norway
2nd place, silver medalist(s)		Timothy Cheruiyot	Kenya
3rd place, bronze medalist(s)		Josh Kerr	Great Britain

Official Video Highlights

The men's 1500 metres event at the 2020 Summer Olympics took place between 3 and 7 August 2021 at the Japan National Stadium. Approximately fifty athletes were expected to compete; the exact number depended on how many nations used universality places to enter athletes in addition to the 45 qualifying through time or ranking (1 universality place was used in 2016). 47 competitors from 27 nations competed. Jakob Ingebrigtsen set a new Olympic record on his way to the gold medal, Norway's first medal in the men's 1500 metres. Timothy Cheruiyot of Kenya took silver, returning that nation to the podium for the first time since a four-Games medal streak ended in 2008. Josh Kerr earned bronze, Great Britain's first medal in the event since 1988.

The winning margin was 0.69 seconds.

== Summary ==
Since 2018, Timothy Cheruiyot has been on top of the world leader board. A step behind him, both in the leader board and in major races was the name Ingebrigtsen, first Filip Ingebrigtsen in 2018, then replaced by his younger brother Jakob Ingebrigtsen still more than a month shy of his 20th birthday at these Olympics. Cheruiyot won the 2019 World Championships by breaking away to a two-second victory in an exceptionally fast race. 2019 was in sharp contrast to the slow, strategic race in Rio, won by Matthew Centrowitz more than 20 seconds slower. Centrowitz was back to defend his title, but was eliminated in the semi-final round along with defending bronze medalist Nick Willis and World Championship bronze medalist Marcin Lewandowski. Olympic silver medalist Taoufik Makhloufi was injured before he could race in Tokyo.

After the runners sorted themselves out at the start of the final, Jakob, the only Ingebrigtsen in the race, moved around the pack to take the lead and press the pace. Cheruiyot moved himself up from mid pack to mark Ingebrigtsen. The first lap was completed in 56.2. Then Cheruiyot moved to the front to press the pace further. The race was in a single file line, Stewart McSweyn and Olli Hoare next in line, Abel Kipsang on the outside trying to get past the two Australians. Second lap 1:51.8, a 55.6 by Cheruiyot. Hoare began moving backward, Jake Wightman came forward to race Kipsang. A gap formed between the lead group of Cheruiyot, Ingebrigtsen and McSweyn, with Kipsang leading the line of chasers. Through the penultimate turn, McSweyn couldn't keep up and the leaders were two. Lap 3 2:47.3, a 55.5. Ingebrigtsen glued to the back of Cheruiyot. Josh Kerr chasing Kipsang for bronze. Through the final turn, Ingebrigtsen moved up on Cheruiyot, then past. Cheruiyot looked back to see who else was going to try to pass him, an obvious sign he had nothing more to offer to chase Ingebrigtsen. Ingebrigtsen opened up a four metre gap before crossing the finish line. Kerr got past Kipsang and chased Cheruiyot to the finish, leaning at the line still didn't quite snatch silver.

Ingebrigtsen's 3:28.32 new Olympic record beat the record set by Kipsang in the semi-finals of 3:31.65, as well as Noah Ngeny's Olympic record from 2000 by 3.75 seconds. Ngeny's final lap, 55.4.

In a much publicized act of sportsmanship Cheruiyot gave a bracelet to Ingebrigtsen along with a congratulatory embrace; Cheruiyot had previously defeated Ingebrigtsen in 10 of their previous meetings over 1500m.

== Background ==
This was the 29th appearance of the event, which is one of 12 athletics events to have been held at every Summer Olympics.

For the first time in Olympic history, no nations made their men's 1500 metres debut this Games. The United States made its 28th appearance, most of all nations (having missed only the boycotted 1980 Games).

== Qualification ==
A National Olympic Committee (NOC) could enter up to 3 qualified athletes in the men's 1500 metres event if all athletes meet the entry standard or qualify by ranking during the qualifying period. (The limit of 3 has been in place since the 1930 Olympic Congress.) The qualifying standard is 3:35.00. This standard was "set for the sole purpose of qualifying athletes with exceptional performances unable to qualify through the IAAF World Rankings pathway." The world rankings, based on the average of the best five results for the athlete over the qualifying period and weighted by the importance of the meet, will then be used to qualify athletes until the cap of 45 is reached.

The qualifying period was originally from 1 May 2019 to 29 June 2020. Due to the COVID-19 pandemic, the period was suspended from 6 April 2020 to 30 November 2020, with the end date extended to 29 June 2021. The world rankings period start date was also changed from 1 May 2019 to 30 June 2020; athletes who had met the qualifying standard during that time were still qualified, but those using world rankings would not be able to count performances during that time. The qualifying time standards could be obtained in various meets during the given period that have the approval of the IAAF. Both indoor and outdoor meets are eligible. The most recent Area Championships may be counted in the ranking, even if not during the qualifying period.

NOCs can also use their universality place—each NOC can enter one male athlete regardless of time if they had no male athletes meeting the entry standard for an athletics event—in the 1500 metres.

Entry number: 45.

Qualification standard	No. of athletes	NOC	Nominated athletes
Entry standard – 3:35.00	3	Australia	Jye Edwards; Ollie Hoare; Stewart McSweyn
Entry standard – 3:35.00	3	Ethiopia	Samuel Abate; Teddese Lemi; Samuel Tefera
Entry standard – 3:35.00	3	France	Azeddine Habz; Alexis Miellet; Baptiste Mischler
Entry standard – 3:35.00	3	Great Britain	Jake Heyward; Josh Kerr; Jake Wightman
Entry standard – 3:35.00	3	Kenya	Timothy Cheruiyot; Abel Kipsang; Charles Simotwo
Entry standard – 3:35.00	3	Morocco	Soufiane El Bakkali; Anass Essayi; Abdelatif Sadiki
Entry standard – 3:35.00	2	United States	Matthew Centrowitz; Yared Nuguse
Entry standard – 3:35.00	2	Spain	Ignacio Fontes; Adel Mechaal
Entry standard – 3:35.00	2	Norway	Filip Ingebrigtsen; Jakob Ingebrigtsen
Entry standard – 3:35.00	2	Poland	Marcin Lewandowski; Michał Rozmys
Entry standard – 3:35.00	2	Qatar	Abdirahman Saeed Hassan; Adam Ali Musab
Entry standard – 3:35.00	1	Algeria	Taoufik Makhloufi
Entry standard – 3:35.00	1	Bahrain	Sadik Mikhou
Entry standard – 3:35.00	1	Belgium	Ismael Debjani
Entry standard – 3:35.00	1	Djibouti	Ayanleh Souleiman
Entry standard – 3:35.00	1	Germany	Robert Farken
Entry standard – 3:35.00	1	New Zealand	Sam Tanner
Entry standard – 3:35.00	1	Sweden	Kalle Berglund
Entry standard – 3:35.00	1	Uganda	Ronald Musagala
World ranking	1	Brazil	Thiago André
World ranking	1	Germany	Amos Bartelsmeyer
World ranking	1	Hungary	István Szögi
World ranking	1	Ireland	Andrew Coscoran
World ranking	1	Luxembourg	Charles Grethen
World ranking	1	New Zealand	Nick Willis
World ranking	1	Spain	Jesús Gómez
World ranking	1	United States	Cole Hocker
Universality Places	1	Equatorial Guinea	Benjamín Enzema
Invitational Places	1	Refugee Olympic Team	Paulo Amotun Lokoro
Total	45		

== Competition format ==
The event continued to use the three-round format used previously in 1952 and since 1964. There were 3 heats, with the top 6 in each heat and next 6 overall advancing to the semifinals (an additional 2 athletes advanced by ruling after being obstructed). There were 2 semifinals, with the top 5 in each semifinal and next 2 overall advancing (another obstruction ruling provided a 13th qualifier for the final).

== Records ==
Prior to this competition, the existing global and area records were as follows:

World record	Hicham El Guerrouj (MAR)	3:26.00	Rome, Italy	14 July 1998
Olympic record	Noah Ngeny (KEN)	3:32.07	Sydney, Australia	29 September 2000
World Leading	Timothy Cheruiyot (KEN)	3:28.28	Fontvieille, Monaco	9 July 2021

Area
Area	Time	Athlete	Nation
Africa (records)	3:26.00 WR	Hicham El Guerrouj	Morocco
Asia (records)	3:29.14	Rashid Ramzi	Bahrain
Europe (records)	3:28.68	Jakob Ingebrigtsen	Norway
North, Central American and Caribbean (records)	3:29.30	Bernard Lagat	United States
Oceania (records)	3:29.66	Nick Willis	New Zealand
South America (records)	3:33.25	Hudson de Souza	Brazil

The following records were established during the competition:

Country	Athlete	Round	Time	Notes
East Timor	Felisberto de Deus	Heats	3:51.03	NR
Luxembourg	Charles Grethen	Semifinals	3:32.86	NR
Kenya	Abel Kipsang	Semifinals	3:31.65	OR
Norway	Jakob Ingebrigtsen	Final	3:28.32	NR, OR, ER

== Schedule ==
All times are Japan Standard Time (UTC+9)

The men's 1500 metres took place over three separate days.

Date	Time	Round
Tuesday, 3 August 2021	9:00	Round 1
Thursday, 5 August 2021	19:00	Semifinals
Saturday, 7 August 2021	18:50	Final

== Results ==
=== Heats ===
Qualification Rules: First 6 in each heat (Q) and the next 6 fastest (q) advance to the semifinals

==== Heat 1 ====
Rank	Athlete	Nation	Time	Notes
1	Ismael Debjani	Belgium	3:36.00	Q
2	Timothy Cheruiyot	Kenya	3:36.01	Q
3	Ollie Hoare	Australia	3:36.09	Q
4	Cole Hocker	United States	3:36.16	Q
5	Abdelatif Sadiki	Morocco	3:36.23	Q
6	Michał Rozmys	Poland	3:36.28	Q
7	Josh Kerr	Great Britain	3:36.29	q
8	Ignacio Fontes	Spain	3:36.95	q
9	Samuel Tefera	Ethiopia	3:37.98	
10	Filip Ingebrigtsen	Norway	3:38.02	
11	Amos Bartelsmeyer	Germany	3:38.36	
12	István Szögi	Hungary	3:38.79	
13	Abraham Guem	South Sudan	3:40.86	PB
14	Alexis Miellet	France	3:41.23	
15	Adam Ali Musab	Qatar	3:42.55	
16	Felisberto de Deus	Timor-Leste	3:51.03	NR

==== Heat 2 ====
Marcin Lewandowski was pushed and fell, but got up again and finished his heat in last place. On appeal, he progressed to the semi-final. Original 8th place finisher Sadik Mikhou was later disqualified on the 8th of August for blood doping after an out of competition test produced an abnormal result.

Rank	Athlete	Nation	Time	Notes
1	Abel Kipsang	Kenya	3:40.68	Q
2	Matthew Centrowitz	United States	3:41.12	Q
3	Jake Wightman	Great Britain	3:41.18	Q
4	Azeddine Habz	France	3:41.24	Q
5	Samuel Abate	Ethiopia	3:41.63	Q
6	Charles Grethen	Luxembourg	3:41.90	Q
7	Jye Edwards	Australia	3:42.62	
–	Sadik Mikhou	Bahrain	3:42.87	DSQ
8	Sam Tanner	New Zealand	3:43.22	
9	Ali Idow Hassan	Somalia	3:43.96	PB
10	Anass Essayi	Morocco	3:45.92	
11	Jesús Gómez	Spain	3:47.27	qR
12	Thiago André	Brazil	3:47.71	
13	Benjamín Enzema	Equatorial Guinea	3:48.17	
14	Marcin Lewandowski	Poland	4:43.96	qR
—	Abdirahman Saeed Hassan	Qatar	DNF	

==== Heat 3 ====
Rank	Athlete	Nation	Time	Notes
1	Jake Heyward	Great Britain	3:36.14	Q
2	Teddese Lemi	Ethiopia	3:36.26	Q
3	Stewart McSweyn	Australia	3:36.39	Q
4	Jakob Ingebrigtsen	Norway	3:36.49	Q
5	Robert Farken	Germany	3:36.61	Q
6	Adel Mechaal	Spain	3:36.74	Q, SB
7	Nick Willis	New Zealand	3:36.88	q, SB
8	Andrew Coscoran	Ireland	3:37.11	q
9	Ayanleh Souleiman	Djibouti	3:37.25	q, SB
10	Charles Simotwo	Kenya	3:37.26	q
11	Baptiste Mischler	France	3:37.53	
12	Kalle Berglund	Sweden	3:49.43	
13	Paulo Amotun Lokoro	Refugee Olympic Team	3:51.78	SB
—	Soufiane El Bakkali	Morocco	DNF	
—	Ronald Musagala	Uganda	DNF	
—	Yared Nuguse	United States	DNS	

=== Semifinals ===
Qualification Rules: First 5 in each heat (Q) and the next 2 fastest (q) advance to the Final

==== Semifinal 1 ====
Rank	Athlete	Nation	Time	Notes
1	Jake Wightman	Great Britain	3:33.48	Q, SB
2	Cole Hocker	United States	3:33.87	Q, PB
3	Timothy Cheruiyot	Kenya	3:33.95	Q
4	Ollie Hoare	Australia	3:34.35	Q
5	Ignacio Fontes	Spain	3:34.49	Q
6	Charles Simotwo	Kenya	3:34.61	
7	Teddese Lemi	Ethiopia	3:34.81	
8	Robert Farken	Germany	3:35.21	
9	Nick Willis	New Zealand	3:35.41	SB
10	Andrew Coscoran	Ireland	3:35.84	
11	Ismael Debjani	Belgium	3:42.18	
—	Ayanleh Souleiman	Djibouti	DNF	
—	Marcin Lewandowski	Poland	DNF	

==== Semifinal 2 ====
Rank	Athlete	Nation	Time	Notes
1	Abel Kipsang	Kenya	3:31.65	Q, OR
2	Jakob Ingebrigtsen	Norway	3:32.13	Q
3	Josh Kerr	Great Britain	3:32.18	Q
4	Adel Mechaal	Spain	3:32.19	Q, PB
5	Stewart McSweyn	Australia	3:32.54	Q
6	Jake Heyward	Great Britain	3:32.82	q, PB
7	Charles Grethen	Luxembourg	3:32.86	q, NR
8	Abdelatif Sadiki	Morocco	3:33.59	PB
9	Matthew Centrowitz	United States	3:33.69	SB
10	Azeddine Habz	France	3:35.12	
11	Samuel Zeleke	Ethiopia	3:37.66	
12	Jesús Gómez	Spain	3:44.46	
13	Michał Rozmys	Poland	3:54.53	qR

=== Final ===
Rank	Athlete	Nation	Time	Notes
1st place, gold medalist(s)	Jakob Ingebrigtsen	Norway	3:28.32	NR, OR, ER
2nd place, silver medalist(s)	Timothy Cheruiyot	Kenya	3:29.01	
3rd place, bronze medalist(s)	Josh Kerr	Great Britain	3:29.05	PB
4	Abel Kipsang	Kenya	3:29.56	PB
5	Adel Mechaal	Spain	3:30.77	PB
6	Cole Hocker	United States	3:31.40	PB
7	Stewart McSweyn	Australia	3:31.91	
8	Michał Rozmys	Poland	3:32.67	PB
9	Jake Heyward	Great Britain	3:34.43	
10	Jake Wightman	Great Britain	3:35.09	
11	Ollie Hoare	Australia	3:35.79	
12	Charles Grethen	Luxembourg	3:36.80	
13	Ignacio Fontes	Spain	3:38.56	
