= 2013 World Youth Championships in Athletics – Boys' 1500 metres =

Boys' 1500 metres at the 2013 World Youth Championships in Athletics
- Venue: RSC Olimpiyskiy
- Dates: 11 July (heats); 14 July (final)
- Competitors: 37
- Winning time: 3:36.77 CR

Medalists
gold medal	Robert Biwott	Kenya
silver medal	Tesfu Tewelde	Eritrea
bronze medal	Titus Kibiego	Kenya

The boys' 1500 metres at the 2013 World Youth Championships in Athletics was held on 11 and 14 July.

== Medalists ==
Gold	Silver	Bronze
Robert Biwott; Kenya	Tesfu Tewelde; Eritrea	Titus Kibiego; Kenya

== Records ==
Prior to the competition, the following records were as follows.

World Youth Best	Nicholas Kiptanui Kemboi (KEN)	3:33.72	Zurich, Switzerland	18 August 2006
Championship Record	Isaac Kiprono Songok (KEN)	3:36.78	Debrecen, Hungary	15 July 2001
World Youth Leading	Robert Biwott (KEN)	3:38.5	Nairobi, Kenya	11 June 2013

== Heats ==
Qualification rule: first 3 of each heat (Q) and the next 3 fastest qualified.

=== Heat 1 ===
Rank	Name	Nationality	Time	Notes
1	Mathiwos Yotota	Ethiopia	3:54.98	Q, PB
2	Robert Biwott	Kenya	3:55.12	Q
3	Tesfu Tewelde	Eritrea	3:55.58	Q
4	Youcef Boulekdam	Algeria	3:56.30	
5	Liam Dee	Great Britain	3:56.64	
6	Idriss Moussa Youssouf	Qatar	3:58.48	PB
7	Evaggelos Milonas	Greece	3:58.80	
8	Ionuţ Drăgușin	Romania	4:03.15	
9	Julio Ortiz	Mexico	4:03.40	
10	Artem Taran	Ukraine	4:05.53	
11	Riley Alvarez	Canada	4:05.91	
12	Serdal Karatas	Turkey	4:14.33	
	Weverton Fidelis	Brazil	DNS	

=== Heat 2 ===
Rank	Name	Nationality	Time	Notes
1	Blake Haney	United States	3:51.95	Q
2	Jesús Ramos	Spain	3:52.49	Q
3	Quentin Tison	France	3:52.82	Q
4	Adam Abdelwahab	Sudan	3:53.64	q, PB
5	Jack Crabtree	Great Britain	3:54.50	
6	Nyasha Mutsetse	Zimbabwe	3:57.15	PB
7	Talel Khalfi	Tunisia	3:58.06	
8	Liam Kennell	Canada	3:59.59	
9	Yassin Bouih	Italy	4:02.12	
10	Luis Solórzano	El Salvador	4:07.67	
11	Filip Sasínek	Czech Republic	4:24.59	
12	Bojan Stanišić	Bosnia and Herzegovina	4:41.50	

=== Heat 3 ===
Rank	Name	Nationality	Time	Notes
1	Grant Fisher	United States	3:50.30	Q, PB
2	Adisneh Amibelu	Ethiopia	3:50.34	Q, PB
3	Titus Kibiego	Kenya	3:50.44	Q
4	Yemaneberhan Crippa	Italy	3:50.58	q, PB
5	Jawad Douhri	Morocco	3:51.05	q
6	Takieddine Hedeilli	Algeria	3:53.98	PB
7	Abe Tsegaytekie	Eritrea	3:54.02	
8	José María Martínez	Mexico	3:57.12	
9	Wellerson Falcão Vivi	Brazil	3:57.59	
10	Balázs Juhász	Hungary	3:58.09	PB
11	Lee Han-eul	South Korea	4:05.94	
12	Ahmet Coşkun	Turkey	4:10.72	

== Final ==
Results:

Rank	! Name	Nationality	Time	Notes
1st place, gold medalist(s)	Robert Biwott	Kenya	3:36.77	CR
2nd place, silver medalist(s)	Tesfu Tewelde	Eritrea	3:42.14	PB
3rd place, bronze medalist(s)	Titus Kibiego	Kenya	3:42.97	
4	Mathiwos Yotota	Ethiopia	3:44.43	PB
5	Blake Haney	United States	3:44.69	PB
6	Yemaneberhan Crippa	Italy	3:45.02	PB
7	Jesús Ramos	Spain	3:48.69	PB
8	Jawad Douhri	Morocco	3:49.44	
9	Grant Fisher	United States	3:52.00	
10	Adam Abdelwahab	Sudan	3:52.71	PB
11	Adisneh Amibelu	Ethiopia	3:54.67	
12	Quentin Tison	France	3:55.77	
