= 2018 African Championships in Athletics – Men's 1500 metres =

The men's 1500 metres event at the 2018 African Championships in Athletics was held on 4 and 5 August in Asaba, Nigeria.

== Medalists ==
Gold	Silver	Bronze
Elijah Manangoi; Kenya	Timothy Cheruiyot; Kenya	Ronald Musagala; Uganda

== Results ==
=== Heats ===
Qualification: First 5 of each heat (Q) and the next 6 fastest (q) qualified for the final.

Rank	Heat	Name	Nationality	Time	Notes
1	1	Elijah Manangoi	Kenya	3:48.15	Q
2	1	Taresa Tolosa	Ethiopia	3:48.42	Q
3	1	Hicham Ouladha	Morocco	3:48.65	Q
4	1	Ronald Musagala	Uganda	3:48.87	Q
5	1	Aman Wote	Ethiopia	3:49.16	Q
6	1	Charles Simotwo	Kenya	3:49.85	q
7	1	Brahim Kaazouzi	Morocco	3:51.45	q
8	1	Hiss Bachir Youssouf	Djibouti	?:??.??	
9	1	Abdessalem Ayouni	Tunisia	?:??.??	
10	1	Alex Ngouari Mouissi	Republic of the Congo	?:??.??	
11	1	Benjamin Manuel Enzema	Equatorial Guinea	?:??.??	
12	1	Santino Kenyi Oreng	South Sudan	?:??.??	q
13	1	Mohammed Dookun	Mauritius	?:??.??	
14	1	Kyondwa Katapala	Democratic Republic of the Congo	?:??.??	
	1	Eric Nzikwinkunda	Burundi	DNS	
1	2	Timothy Cheruiyot	Kenya	3:42.65	Q
2	2	Ayanleh Souleiman	Djibouti	3:42.90	Q
3	2	Abdalaati Iguider	Morocco	3:43.35	Q
4	2	Jerry Motsau	South Africa	3:44.38	Q
5	2	Rashid Etiau	Uganda	3:44.56	Q
6	2	Samuel Tefera	Ethiopia	3:44.77	q
7	2	Abderraouf Boubaker	Tunisia	?:??.??	
8	2	Geofrey Rutto	Uganda	3:45.49	q
9	2	Paulo Amotun Lokoro	ART	?:??.??	q
10	2	Idow Ali	Somalia	?:??.??	
11	2	Adam Fadalla Abdelwahab Musa	Sudan	?:??.??	
	2	Jach Majok Wol	South Sudan	DNS	

=== Final ===
Rank	Athlete	Nationality	Time	Notes
1st place, gold medalist(s)	Elijah Manangoi	Kenya	3:35.20	
2nd place, silver medalist(s)	Timothy Cheruiyot	Kenya	3:35.93	
3rd place, bronze medalist(s)	Ronald Musagala	Uganda	3:36.41	
4	Ayanleh Souleiman	Djibouti	3:37.18	
5	Aman Wote	Ethiopia	3:38.49	
6	Abdalaati Iguider	Morocco	3:39.20	
7	Santino Kenyi Oreng	South Sudan	3:40.99	
8	Charles Simotwo	Kenya	3:42.11	
9	Hicham Ouladha	Morocco	3:42.61	
10	Samuel Tefera	Ethiopia	3:45.38	
11	Taresa Tolosa	Ethiopia	3:49.48	
12	Rashid Etiau	Uganda	3:50.00	
13	Jerry Motsau	South Africa	3:50.68	
14	Geofrey Rutto	Uganda	3:50.85	
15	Paulo Amotun Lokoro	ART	4:03.44	
	Brahim Kaazouzi	Morocco	DNS	
