= Athletics at the 2019 African Games – Men's 1500 metres =

The men's 1500 metres event at the 2019 African Games was held on 29 and 30 August in Rabat.

== Medalists ==
Gold	Silver	Bronze
George Meitamei Manangoi; Kenya	Ayanleh Souleiman; Djibouti	Charles Cheboi Simotwo; Kenya

== Results ==
=== Heats ===
Qualification: First 4 in each heat (Q) and the next 4 fastest (q) advanced to the final.

Rank	Heat	Name	Nationality	Time	Notes
1	1	Hicham Ouladha	Morocco	3:38.60	Q
2	1	Boaz Kiprugut	Kenya	3:38.62	Q
3	1	Kebede Endale	Ethiopia	3:39.24	Q
4	1	Gabriel Gerald Geay	Tanzania	3:39.30	Q
5	1	Abdullahi Jama Mohamed	Somalia	3:39.97	q
6	1	Youssouf Hiss Bachir	Djibouti	3:40.04	q
7	1	Birhanu Sorsa	Ethiopia	3:42.62	q
8	2	Abdalaati Iguider	Morocco	3:42.98	Q
9	2	Charles Cheboi Simotwo	Kenya	3:43.15	Q
10	1	Guem Guem	South Sudan	3:43.36	q, NR
11	2	Ayanleh Souleiman	Djibouti	3:43.42	Q
12	2	George Meitamei Manangoi	Kenya	3:43.44	Q
13	1	Dey Dey Tuach	South Sudan	3:43.79	
14	2	Taddese Lemi	Ethiopia	3:43.85	
15	2	Hicham Akenkam	Morocco	3:44.41	
16	2	Abdi Waiss Mouhyadin	Djibouti	3:44.98	
17	2	Meron Goitom	Eritrea	3:48.02	
18	2	Alex Ngouari-Mouissi	Republic of the Congo	3:48.12	
19	2	Wol Wol	South Sudan	3:48.43	
20	2	Patrick Nibafasha	Burundi	3:49.25	
21	1	Tshepiso Masalela	Botswana	3:50.29	
22	1	Manuel Benjamin	Equatorial Guinea	3:54.41	
23	2	Mohammad Ilshad Dookun	Mauritius	4:01.00	
24	2	Melchor Oyono Abaga	Equatorial Guinea	4:22.63	
	1	Ali Hisseine Mahamat	Chad	DNS	
	1	Abdessalem Ayouni	Tunisia	DNS	
	2	Hamada Mohamed	Egypt	DNS	

=== Final ===
Rank	Name	Nationality	Time	Notes
1st place, gold medalist(s)	George Meitamei Manangoi	Kenya	3:38.27	
2nd place, silver medalist(s)	Ayanleh Souleiman	Djibouti	3:38.44	
3rd place, bronze medalist(s)	Charles Cheboi Simotwo	Kenya	3:38.51	
4	Abdalaati Iguider	Morocco	3:38.59	
5	Hicham Ouladha	Morocco	3:39.00	
6	Gabriel Gerald Geay	Tanzania	3:39.29	
7	Kebede Endale	Ethiopia	3:40.01	
8	Boaz Kiprugut	Kenya	3:40.44	
9	Abdullahi Jama Mohamed	Somalia	3:41.49	
10	Birhanu Sorsa	Ethiopia	3:42.97	
11	Guem Guem	South Sudan	3:45.94	
	Youssouf Hiss Bachir	Djibouti	DNF	
