= Athletics at the 2016 Summer Olympics – Men's 1500 metres =

Men's 1500 metres at the Games of the XXXI Olympiad
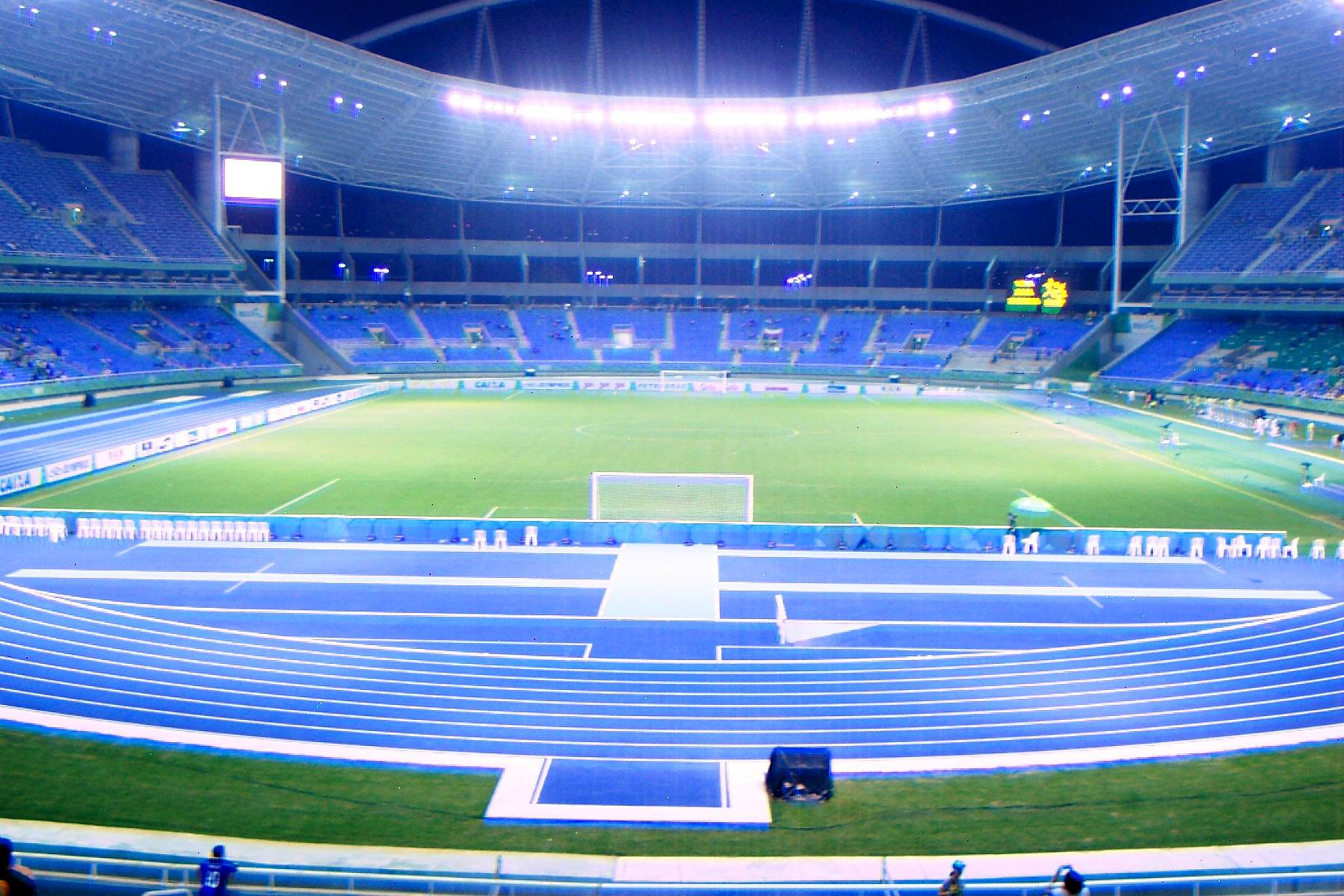
- Interior view of the Estádio Olímpico João Havelange, where the Men's 1500m took place.
- Venue: Olympic Stadium
- Dates: 16 August 2016 (heats); 18 August 2016 (semi-final); 20 August 2016 (final)
- Competitors: 42 from 26 nations
- Winning time: 3:50.00

Medalists
1st place, gold medalist(s)		Matthew Centrowitz, Jr. United States
2nd place, silver medalist(s)		Taoufik Makhloufi; Algeria
3rd place, bronze medalist(s)		Nick Willis; New Zealand

The men's 1500 metres event at the 2016 Summer Olympics took place between 16–20 August at the Olympic Stadium in Rio de Janeiro, Brazil. Forty-two athletes from 26 nations competed. The event was won by Matthew Centrowitz, Jr. of the United States, the nation's first title in the event since 1908 and third overall. Taoufik Makhloufi and Nick Willis became the seventh and eighth men to win a second medal in the event, with Willis the only one to do so in non-consecutive Games.

== Summary ==
Asbel Kiprop entered as the highest ranked athlete of the year with his run of 3:29.33 minutes, and was the gold medallist at the 2008 Olympics and the previous three World Championships in Athletics. In his race immediately prior to the Olympics, however, he had been beaten by his compatriot Ronald Kwemoi and Elijah Motonei Manangoi (second and third in the seasonal rankings). The reigning Olympic champion from 2012, Taoufik Makhloufi of Algeria, was fourth on the world lists, but faced the challenge of also running the 800 m which overlapped on the programme. The next highest ranked runners, Abdalaati Iguider and Ayanleh Souleiman, also entered for doubles.

In the first round the main protagonists progressed, although a notable elimination was reigning European champion Filip Ingebrigtsen, who was disqualified for impeding Charlie Grice and Homiyu Tesfaye (both runners were advanced as a result). İlham Tanui Özbilen of Turkey (a 2012 World Indoor medallist) was knocked out, having shown poor form that year. Jakub Holuša of the Czech Republic was fastest in the heats with 3:38.31 minutes, leading a race which saw ten men run under 3:40.

Although the semi-finals produced slower times, heats leader Holuša was among those eliminated. Former European champion Henrik Ingebrigtsen and reigning African Games champion Mekonnen Gebremedhin also failed to make the final and Kenya's Elijah Manangoi did not start after suffering a hamstring injury. The two remaining Kenyans, Kiprop and Kwemoi won the two semi-final races. American Robby Andrews initially made the grade, with his typical fast finish, but as he made his way on the inside, he initially tried to take open space between Gebremedhin and the rail, but Gebremedhin defended his position and Andrews had nowhere to go except inside the rail, where he executed the pass to get into the final qualifying spot. He was later disqualified for stepping off the track.

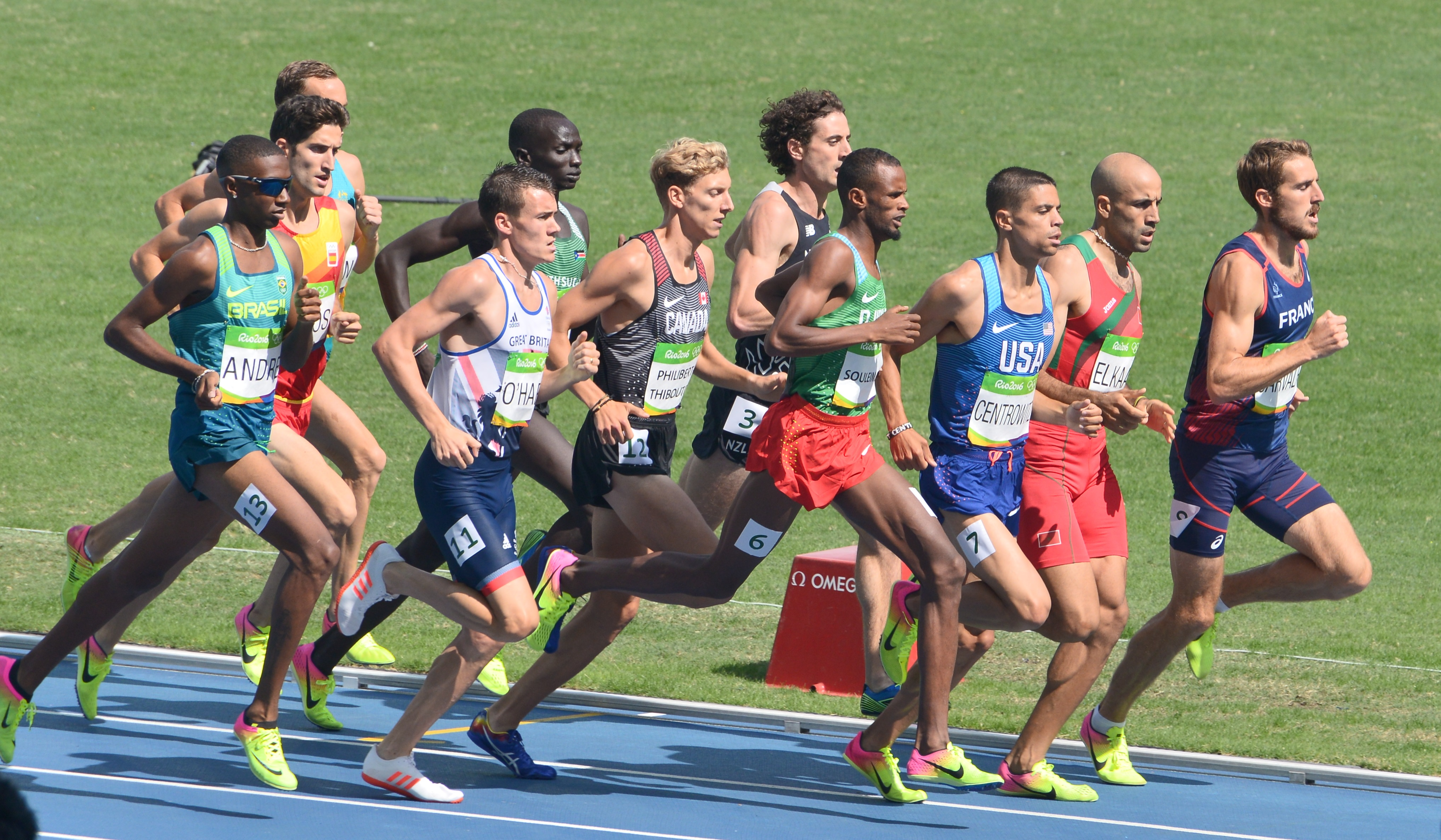
Semi-final of the 1500 m at the 2016 Olympics.

=== Final ===
At the start, nobody wanted the lead, so the role defaulted to Americans Matthew Centrowitz and Ben Blankenship sandwiching David Bustos. Kickers Asbel Kiprop, Taoufik Makhloufi and Ayanleh Souleiman went to the back. The first lap was 66.83, a virtual crawl for these athletes. During the second lap, Nick Willis drifted to the front to replace Blankenship next to Bustos and Centrowitz. On the homestretch, Kiprop moved out to lane 2 and loped up toward the front. Reacting, Ronald Kwemoi crashed to the track as Souleiman was drifting out to find some running room at the back of the pack and Kwemoi caught Souleiman's back kick. The pace was so slow, Kwemoi caught back up to the runners in less than 100 metres. The second lap was even slower at 69.76. Down the next backstretch, Kiprop moved aggressively to challenge Centrowitz at the front, but Centrowitz wouldn't let him by, holding his position on the curb. Behind him, Willis and Blankenship were getting tangled up in a similar situation. Coming around the turn, Souleiman tried to pass again and was successful, taking the lead position on the home stretch. Instead of charging away, Souleiman slowed down. Centrowitz took the small gap next to the rail and squeezed through, deftly slipping his elbow and shoulder in front of Souleiman. Just at the bell, Makhloufi hit the front outside of Centrowitz. But on the penultimate turn, Centrowitz would not let Makhloufi by holding the inside and the lead. Makhloufi fell in behind Centrowitz. Along the backstretch, Kiprop loped to the front again. Centrowitz held him off, making him run to the outside of the turn. Behind Kiprop, then lining up beside him, Abdalaati Iguider, Kiprop and Makhloufi, behind them Willis and Souleiman, all ready to pounce coming off the turn. Kiprop made his move, then began to tread water moving backwards instead of gaining. On the outside, Makhloufi was gaining but was running out of real estate. Iguider was moving backwards with Kiprop, Willis beat Souleiman to the pounce and was chasing Makhloufi. Nobody passed Centrowitz as he kept his advantage all the way across the finish line, finishing the final lap in 50.62. Makhloufi was a meter back for silver, Willis another meter back holding off a diving Souleiman at the line for bronze. The winning time of 3:50.00 was the slowest since 1932. Centrowitz became the first American to win the event since Mel Sheppard in 1908.

The medals were presented by Nawal El Moutawakel, IOC member, Morocco and Sebastian Coe, President of the IAAF and 1980-4 double gold medalist in this event.

== Background ==
This was the 28th appearance of the event, which is one of 12 athletics events to have been held at every Summer Olympics. Eight of the twelve finalists from 2012 returned: gold medalist Taoufik Makhloufi of Algeria, bronze medalist Abdalaati Iguider of Morocco, fourth-place finisher Matthew Centrowitz, Jr. of the United States, fifth-place finisher Henrik Ingebrigtsen of Norway, sixth-place finisher Mekonnen Gebremedhin of Ethiopia, eighth-place finisher İlham Tanui Özbilen of Turkey, ninth-place finisher Nick Willis of New Zealand, and twelfth-place finisher Asbel Kiprop of Kenya. Kiprop and Willis had won gold and silver in 2008; Iguider had been in the 2008 final, as well. Kiprop was the three-time reigning world champion; he and Makhloufi were favored in this race.

East Timor, South Sudan, and the Refugee Olympic Team each made their first appearance in the event. The United States made its 27th appearance, most of all nations (having missed only the boycotted 1980 Games).

== Qualification ==
A National Olympic Committee (NOC) could enter up to 3 qualified athletes in the men's 1500 metres event if all athletes meet the entry standard during the qualifying period. (The limit of 3 has been in place since the 1930 Olympic Congress.) The qualifying standard was 3:36.20. The qualifying period was from 1 May 2015 to 11 July 2016. The qualifying time standards could be obtained in various meets during the given period that have the approval of the IAAF. Indoor and outdoor meets were accepted. NOCs could also use their universality place—each NOC could enter one male athlete regardless of time if they had no male athletes meeting the entry standard for an athletics event—in the 1500 metres.

== Competition format ==
The competition was again three rounds (used previously in 1952 and since 1964). The "fastest loser" system introduced in 1964 was used for both the first round and semifinals. The 12-man semifinals and finals introduced in 1984 and used since 1992 were retained.

There were three heats in the first round, each with 14 or 15 runners (before withdrawals). The top six runners in each heat, along with the next six fastest overall, advanced to the semifinals. The 24 semifinalists were divided into two semifinals, each with 12 runners (13 each after two runners were advanced due to obstruction, though one was back down to 12 after a withdrawal). The top five men in each semifinal, plus the next two fastest overall, advanced to the 12-man final (again, 13 after a runner was advanced due to obstruction).

== Records ==
Prior to this competition, the existing global and area records were as follows:

World record	Hicham El Guerrouj (MAR)	3:26.00	Rome, Italy	14 July 1998
Olympic record	Noah Ngeny (KEN)	3:32.07	Sydney, Australia	29 September 2000
World Leading	Asbel Kiprop (KEN)	3:29.33	Birmingham, United Kingdom	05 June 2016

Area
Area	Time (s)	Athlete	Nation
Africa (records)	3:26.00 WR	Hicham El Guerrouj	Morocco
Asia (records)	3:29.14	Rashid Ramzi	Bahrain
Europe (records)	3:28.81	Mo Farah	Great Britain
North, Central America and Caribbean (records)	3:29.30	Bernard Lagat	United States
Oceania (records)	3:29.66	Nick Willis	New Zealand
South America (records)	3:33.25	Hudson de Souza	Brazil

No new records were set during the competition.

== Schedule ==
All times are Brasília Time (UTC−3).

Date	Time	Round
Tuesday, 16 August 2016	10:30	Heats
Thursday, 18 August 2016	20:45	Semifinals
Saturday, 20 August 2016	21:00	Finals

== Results ==
=== Round 1 ===
==== Heat 1 ====
Rank	Athlete	Nation	Time	Notes
1	Asbel Kiprop	Kenya	3:38.97	Q
2	Ryan Gregson	Australia	3:39.13	Q
3	Ayanleh Souleiman	Djibouti	3:39.25	Q
4	Chris O'Hare	Great Britain	3:39.26	Q
5	Matthew Centrowitz	United States	3:39.31	Q
6	Fouad Elkaam	Morocco	3:39.51	Q
7	David Bustos	Spain	3:39.73	q
8	Charles Philibert-Thiboutot	Canada	3:40.04	q
9	Julian Matthews	New Zealand	3:40.40	
10	Florian Carvalho	France	3:41.87	
11	Thiago André	Brazil	3:44.42	
12	Santino Kenyi	South Sudan	3:45.27	
13	Saud Al-Zaabi	United Arab Emirates	4:02.35	
—	Aman Wote	Ethiopia	DNS	

==== Heat 2 ====
Rank	Athlete	Nation	Time	Notes
1	Taoufik Makhloufi	Algeria	3:46.82	Q
2	Elijah Motonei Manangoi	Kenya	3:46.83	Q
3	Robby Andrews	United States	3:46.97	Q
4	Nathan Brannen	Canada	3:47.07	Q
5	Mekonnen Gebremedhin	Ethiopia	3:47.33	Q
6	Brahim Kaazouzi	Morocco	3:47.39	Q
7	Homiyu Tesfaye	Germany	3:47.44	q (Note: Tesfaye and Grice were advanced after being obstructed by F. Ingebrigtsen.)
8	Hamish Carson	New Zealand	3:48.18	
9	Adel Mechaal	Spain	3:48.41	
10	Charlie Grice	Great Britain	3:48.51	q
11	Paulo Lokoro	Refugee Olympic Team	4:03.96	
12	Augusto Soares	Timor-Leste	4:11.35	PB
—	Abdi Waiss Mouhyadin	Djibouti	DNF	
—	Filip Ingebrigtsen	Norway	DQ	R163.2

==== Heat 3 ====
Rank	Athlete	Nation	Time	Notes
1	Jakub Holusa	Czech Republic	3:38.31	Q
2	Ronald Kwemoi	Kenya	3:38.33	Q
3	Abdalaati Iguider	Morocco	3:38.40	Q
4	Ronald Musagala	Uganda	3:38.45	Q
5	Henrik Ingebrigtsen	Norway	3:38.50	Q
6	Nicholas Willis	New Zealand	3:38.55	Q
7	Benson Kiplagat Seurei	Bahrain	3:38.82	q
8	Pieter-Jan Hannes	Belgium	3:38.89	q
9	Ben Blankenship	United States	3:38.92	q
10	Dawit Wolde	Ethiopia	3:39.29	q
11	Salim Keddar	Algeria	3:40.63	
12	Luke Mathews	Australia	3:44.51	
13	Ilham Tanui Ozbilen	Turkey	3:49.02	
14	Mohammed Rageh	Yemen	3:58.99	
15	Erick Rodríguez	Nicaragua	4:00.30	

=== Semifinals ===
==== Semifinal 1 ====
Rank	Athlete	Nation	Time	Notes
1	Asbel Kiprop	Kenya	3:39.73	Q
2	Taoufik Makhloufi	Algeria	3:39.88	Q
3	Nicholas Willis	New Zealand	3:39.96	Q
4	Ben Blankenship	United States	3:39.99	Q
5	Charlie Grice	Great Britain	3:40.05	Q
6	Abdalaati Iguider	Morocco	3:40.11	q
7	Nathan Brannen	Canada	3:40.20	q
8	Benson Kiplagat Seurei	Bahrain	3:40.53	
9	Jakub Holusa	Czech Republic	3:40.83	
10	Dawit Wolde	Ethiopia	3:41.42	
11	Henrik Ingebrigtsen	Norway	3:42.51	
12	Pieter-Jan Hannes	Belgium	3:43.71	
13	Brahim Kaazouzi	Morocco	3:48.66	

==== Semifinal 2 ====
Rank	Athlete	Nation	Time	Notes
1	Ronald Kwemoi	Kenya	3:39.42	Q
2	Ayanleh Souleiman	Djibouti	3:39.46	Q
3	Matthew Centrowitz	United States	3:39.61	Q
4	Ryan Gregson	Australia	3:40.02	Q
5	Ronald Musagala	Uganda	3:40.37	Q
6	Mekonnen Gebremedhin	Ethiopia	3:40.69	
7	Homiyu Tesfaye	Germany	3:40.76	
8	Charles Philibert-Thiboutot	Canada	3:40.79	
9	Fouad Elkaam	Morocco	3:40.93	
10	Chris O'Hare	Great Britain	3:44.27	
11	David Bustos	Spain	3:56.54	q (Note: Bustos was given a place in the final after the video referee deemed he had been impeded by another competitor, by rule 163.2a.)
—	Robby Andrews	United States	DQ	R163.4
—	Elijah Manangoi	Kenya	DNS	

=== Final ===
Rank	Athlete	Nation	Time	Notes
1st place, gold medalist(s)	Matthew Centrowitz, Jr.	United States	3:50.00	
2nd place, silver medalist(s)	Taoufik Makhloufi	Algeria	3:50.11	
3rd place, bronze medalist(s)	Nick Willis	New Zealand	3:50.24	
4	Ayanleh Souleiman	Djibouti	3:50.29	
5	Abdalaati Iguider	Morocco	3:50.58	
6	Asbel Kiprop	Kenya	3:50.87	
7	David Bustos	Spain	3:51.06	
8	Ben Blankenship	United States	3:51.09	
9	Ryan Gregson	Australia	3:51.39	
10	Nathan Brannen	Canada	3:51.45	
11	Ronald Musagala	Uganda	3:51.68	
12	Charlie Grice	Great Britain	3:51.73	
13	Ronald Kwemoi	Kenya	3:56.76	
