= 2017 World Championships in Athletics – Men's 1500 metres =

Men's 1500 metres at the 2017 World Championships
- Venue: Olympic Stadium
- Dates: 10 August (heats); 11 August (semifinal); 13 August (final)
- Competitors: 42 from 26 nations
- Winning time: 3:33.61

Medalists
gold medal	Elijah Manangoi	Kenya
silver medal	Timothy Cheruiyot	Kenya
bronze medal	Filip Ingebrigtsen	Norway

The men's 1500 metres at the 2017 World Championships in Athletics was held at the London Olympic Stadium on 10, 11, and 13 August. The winning margin was 0.38 seconds.

== Summary ==
From the gun in the final, the Kenyan team took charge as Elijah Manangoi from the inside and Timothy Cheruiyot from the outside squeezed the pack behind their wall. The third Kenyan, Asbel Kiprop went to his typical position marking the back of the pack. After a moderate lap, controlling the pace, Kiprop moved forward and the two leaders accelerated to a quick five metre breakaway. In the next half lap, that break expanded to 10 metres with only Kiprop able to bridge the gap. Through the next half lap, three men, led by Filip Ingebrigtsen (NOR), followed by Adel Mechaal (ESP) and Sadik Mikhou (BHR) were able to bridge the gap, with Ingebrigtsen able to reach the trailing Kiprop on the inside at the bell. Ingebrigtsen was able to hold the inside, making Kiprop run to the outside through the penultimate turn. Down the backstretch Mechaal was also able to pass Kiprop, who was struggling. The sweep was broken but Cheruiyot and Manangoi were still in front, Cheruiyot holding the leading inside position. Coming off the turn, Manangoi displayed some of his reputed 46 second (400) speed, running past his teammate and on to a 2-metre victory. Three metres behind, Mechaal made a serious move to try to get ahead of Ingebrigtsen, trying to pass in the narrow space on the inside. He got his shoulders as far as Ingebrigtsen's 10 metres prior to the finish but couldn't get by, both men struggling and falling toward the finish line. Ingebrigtsen leaned for the bronze medal position while Mechaal put his hand out onto Ingebrigtsen's back. Ingebrigtsen fell into a sideways somersault after the finish, both finishing just ahead of a fast closing Jakub Holuša (CZE).

== Records ==
Before the competition records were as follows:

Record	Perf.	Athlete	Nat.	Date	Location
World	3:26.00	Hicham El Guerrouj	MAR	14 Jul 1998	Rome, Italy
Championship	3:27.65	Hicham El Guerrouj	MAR	24 Aug 1999	Sevilla, Spain
World leading	3:28.80	Elijah Motonei Manangoi	KEN	21 Jul 2017	Monaco
African	3:26.00	Hicham El Guerrouj	MAR	14 Jul 1998	Rome, Italy
Asian	3:29.14	Rashid Ramzi	BHR	14 Jul 2006	Rome, Italy
NACAC	3:29.30	Bernard Lagat	USA	28 Aug 2005	Rieti, Italy
South American	3:33.25	Hudson de Souza	BRA	28 Aug 2005	Rieti, Italy
European	3:28.81	Mohamed Farah	GBR	19 Jul 2013	Monaco
Oceanian	3:29.66	Nicholas Willis	NZL	17 Jul 2015	Monaco

The following records were set at the competition:

Record	Perf.	Athlete	Nat.	Date
Gibraltarian	3:44.03	Harvey Dixon	GIB	10 Aug 2017

== Qualification standard ==
The standard to qualify automatically for entry was 3:36.00.

== Schedule ==
The event schedule, in local time (UTC+1), is as follows:

Date	Time	Round
10 August	20:25	Heats
11 August	20:10	Semifinals
13 August	20:30	Final

== Results ==
=== Heats ===
The first round took place on 10 August in three heats as follows:

Heat	1	2	3
Start time	20:25	20:37	20:48
Photo finish	link	link	link

The first six in each heat ( Q ) and the next six fastest ( q ) qualified for the semifinals. The overall results were as follows:

Rank	Heat	Name	Nationality	Time	Notes
1	3	Luke Mathews	Australia	3:38.19	Q
2	3	Timothy Cheruiyot	Kenya	3:38.41	Q
3	3	Filip Ingebrigtsen	Norway	3:38.46	Q
4	3	Jake Wightman	Great Britain & N.I.	3:38.50	Q
5	3	Homiyu Tesfaye	Germany	3:38.57	Q
6	3	Adel Mechaal	Spain	3:38.99	Q
7	3	Fouad Elkaam	Morocco	3:39.33	q
8	3	John Gregorek	United States	3:39.62	q
9	3	Kalle Berglund	Sweden	3:39.62	q
10	3	Benson Seurei	Bahrain	3:39.77	q
11	3	Michał Rozmys	Poland	3:40.28	q
12	2	Sadik Mikhou	Bahrain	3:42.12	Q
13	2	Jakub Holuša	Czech Republic	3:42.31	Q
14	2	Chris O'Hare	Great Britain & N.I.	3:42.53	Q
15	2	Ronald Musagala	Uganda	3:42.75	Q
16	2	Nick Willis	New Zealand	3:42.75	Q
17	2	Robby Andrews	United States	3:43.03	Q
18	2	Ronald Kwemoi	Kenya	3:43.10	q
19	2	Federico Bruno	Argentina	3:43.16	
20	2	Ryan Gregson	Australia	3:43.28	
21	2	Marc Alcalá	Spain	3:43.28	
22	3	Ismael Debjani	Belgium	3:43.71	
23	3	Harvey Dixon	Gibraltar	3:44.03	NR
24	1	Elijah Manangoi	Kenya	3:45.93	Q
25	1	Asbel Kiprop	Kenya	3:45.96	Q
26	1	Timo Benitz	Germany	3:46.01	Q
27	1	Abdalaati Iguider	Morocco	3:46.03	Q
28	1	Marcin Lewandowski	Poland	3:46.06	Q
29	1	Jordan Williamsz	Australia	3:46.11	Q
30	1	Mahiedine Mekhissi-Benabbad	France	3:46.17	
31	1	Samuel Tefera	Ethiopia	3:46.22	
32	1	David Torrence	Peru	3:46.39	
33	1	Ayanleh Souleiman	Djibouti	3:46.64	
34	1	Josh Kerr	Great Britain & N.I.	3:47.30	
35	1	Abderrahmane Anou	Algeria	3:47.38	
36	1	David Bustos	Spain	3:47.52	
37	1	Matthew Centrowitz	United States	3:48.34	
38	2	Benjamín Enzema	Equatorial Guinea	3:48.39	
39	3	Erick Rodríguez	Nicaragua	3:52.35	SB
40	2	Dominic Lokinyomo Lobalu	Athlete Refugee Team	3:52.78	PB
41	2	Richard Douma	Netherlands	3:55.36	q
	3	Taresa Tolosa	Ethiopia	DNF	
	2	Brahim Akachab	Morocco	DNS	
	2	Chala Regassa	Ethiopia	DNS	
	1	Thiago André	Brazil	DNS	

=== Semifinals ===
The semifinals took place on 11 August in two heats as follows:

Heat	1	2
Start time	20:10	20:20
Photo finish	link	link

The first five in each heat ( Q ) and the next two fastest ( q ) qualified for the final. The overall results were as follows:

Rank	Heat	Name	Nationality	Time	Notes
1	2	Jakub Holuša	Czech Republic	3:38.05	Q
2	2	Timothy Cheruiyot	Kenya	3:38.14	Q
3	2	Marcin Lewandowski	Poland	3:38.32	Q
4	2	Chris O'Hare	Great Britain & N.I.	3:38.59	Q
5	2	Fouad Elkaam	Morocco	3:38.64	Q
6	2	Nick Willis	New Zealand	3:38.68	q
7	2	John Gregorek	United States	3:38.68	q
8	2	Jordan Williamsz	Australia	3:38.93	
9	2	Ronald Kwemoi	Kenya	3:39.47	
10	2	Homiyu Tesfaye	Germany	3:39.72	
11	2	Kalle Berglund	Sweden	3:40.05	
12	1	Elijah Manangoi	Kenya	3:40.10	Q
13	1	Asbel Kiprop	Kenya	3:40.14	Q
14	1	Filip Ingebrigtsen	Norway	3:40.23	Q
15	1	Sadik Mikhou	Bahrain	3:40.52	Q
16	1	Adel Mechaal	Spain	3:40.60	Q
17	1	Abdalaati Iguider	Morocco	3:40.76	
18	1	Luke Mathews	Australia	3:40.91	
19	2	Benson Seurei	Bahrain	3:40.96	
20	1	Jake Wightman	Great Britain & N.I.	3:41.79	
21	1	Ronald Musagala	Uganda	3:42.01	
22	1	Michał Rozmys	Poland	3:42.94	
23	1	Timo Benitz	Germany	3:44.38	
24	2	Richard Douma	Netherlands	3:47.74	
	1	Robby Andrews	United States	DNF	

=== Final ===
The final took place on 13 August at 20:30. The results were as follows (photo finish):

Rank	Name	Nationality	Time	Notes
1st place, gold medalist(s)	Elijah Manangoi	Kenya	3:33.61	
2nd place, silver medalist(s)	Timothy Cheruiyot	Kenya	3:33.99	
3rd place, bronze medalist(s)	Filip Ingebrigtsen	Norway	3:34.53	
4	Adel Mechaal	Spain	3:34.71	
5	Jakub Holuša	Czech Republic	3:34.89	
6	Sadik Mikhou	Bahrain	3:35.81	
7	Marcin Lewandowski	Poland	3:36.02	
8	Nick Willis	New Zealand	3:36.82	
9	Asbel Kiprop	Kenya	3:37.24	
10	John Gregorek	United States	3:37.56	
11	Fouad Elkaam	Morocco	3:37.72	
12	Chris O'Hare	Great Britain & N.I.	3:38.28	
