= 2014 African Championships in Athletics – Men's 1500 metres =

The men's 1500 metres event at the 2014 African Championships in Athletics was held August 13–14 on Stade de Marrakech.

== Medalists ==
Gold	Silver	Bronze
Ayanleh Souleiman; Djibouti	Asbel Kiprop; Kenya	Ronald Kipkemboi; Kenya

== Results ==
=== Heats ===
Qualification: First 4 of each heat (Q) and the next 4 fastest (q) qualified for the final.

Rank	Heat	Name	Nationality	Time	Notes
1	2	Asbel Kiprop	Kenya	3:43.87	Q
2	2	Ronald Kipkemboi	Kenya	3:43.93	Q
3	2	Ayanleh Souleiman	Djibouti	3:44.12	Q
4	2	Abiyot Abinet	Ethiopia	3:44.62	Q
5	2	Teklit Teweldebrhan	Eritrea	3:44.89	q
6	2	Yacine Hathat	Algeria	3:45.10	q
7	2	Fouad Elkaam	Morocco	3:45.75	q
8	2	Abdessalem Ayouni	Tunisia	3:47.97	q
9	2	Zabulon Ndikumana	Burundi	3:47.97	
10	1	Mekonnen Gebremedhin	Ethiopia	3:54.73	Q
11	1	Yassine Bensghir	Morocco	3:54.98	Q (Later DQ for doping)
12	1	James Magut	Kenya	3:54.99	Q
13	1	Johan Cronje	South Africa	3:55.17	Q
14	1	Khaled Giaeda	Libya	3:55.56	
15	2	Samir Jamma	Morocco	3:56.28	
16	1	Moussa Camara	Mali	3:56.90	
17	1	Abdi Waiss Mouhyadin	Djibouti	3:57.99	
18	1	Franck Ngouari-Mouissi	Republic of the Congo	3:59.18	
19	1	Attoumane Abdoul Had	Comoros	4:17.58	
	1	Jamal Abdi Dirieh	Djibouti	DNS	
	2	Arthur Kakuji	Democratic Republic of the Congo	DNS	
	1	Taoufik Makhloufi	Algeria	DNS	

=== Final ===
Rank	Name	Nationality	Time	Notes
1st place, gold medalist(s)	Ayanleh Souleiman	Djibouti	3:42.49	
2nd place, silver medalist(s)	Asbel Kiprop	Kenya	3:42.58	
3rd place, bronze medalist(s)	Ronald Kipkemboi	Kenya	3:42.59	
4	Mekonnen Gebremedhin	Ethiopia	3:42.65	
5	James Magut	Kenya	3:43.82	
6	Johan Cronje	South Africa	3:44.40	
7	Abdessalem Ayouni	Tunisia	3:44.67	
8	Fouad Elkaam	Morocco	3:44.99	
9	Abiyot Abinet	Ethiopia	3:45.23	
10	Yacine Hathat	Algeria	3:45.52	
11	Teklit Teweldebrhan	Eritrea	3:49.23	
(6th) DQ	Yassine Bensghir	Morocco	3:44.00	DQ for doping
