= Tesfu =

Tesfu is a given name and surname. Notable people with the name include:

- Tesfu Tewelde (born 1997), Eritrean long-distance runner
- Dolshi Tesfu (born 1999), Eritrean long-distance runner
