= Athletics at the 2015 African Games – Men's 1500 metres =

The men's 1500 metres event at the 2015 African Games was held on 13 and 14 September.

== Medalists ==
Gold	Silver	Bronze
Mekonnen Gebremedhin; Ethiopia	Abdi Waiss Mouhyadin; Djibouti	Salim Keddar; Algeria

== Results ==
=== Heats ===
Qualification: First 4 in each heat (Q) and the next 4 fastest (q) advanced to the final.

Rank	Heat	Name	Nationality	Time	Notes
1	2	Ronald Kwemoi	Kenya	3:46.52	Q
2	2	Salim Keddar	Algeria	3:46.95	Q
3	2	Mulugeta Asefa	Ethiopia	3:46.96	Q
4	2	Alex Ngouare Moissi	Republic of the Congo	3:47.03	Q, NR
5	1	Mekonnen Gebremedhin	Ethiopia	3:48.32	Q
6	1	Aman Kadi	Ethiopia	3:48.58	Q
7	1	Youssouf Hiss Bachir	Djibouti	3:49.04	Q
8	2	Dumisane Hlaselo	South Africa	3:49.28	q
9	2	Abdi Waiss Mouhyadin	Djibouti	3:49.85	q
10	2	Abdessalem Ayouni	Tunisia	3:51.01	q
11	1	Tesfu Tewelde	Eritrea	3:51.58	Q
12	1	James Magut	Kenya	3:53.01	q
12	2	Ali Udou Hassan	Somalia	3:53.01	q
14	1	Yousif Abdalla Timbo	Sudan	3:55.13	
15	1	Ahmed Hussein Hassan	Somalia	3:58.94	
16	2	Santino Kenyi Oreng	South Sudan	4:04.14	
	1	Kevin Bobando	Republic of the Congo	DNS	
	1	Hillary Kemboi	Kenya	DNS	
	1	David Conj Taban	South Sudan	DNS	
	2	Abdel Moula Hossney	Sudan	DNS	

=== Final ===
Rank	Name	Nationality	Time	Notes
1st place, gold medalist(s)	Mekonnen Gebremedhin	Ethiopia	3:45.73	
2nd place, silver medalist(s)	Abdi Waiss Mouhyadin	Djibouti	3:45.98	
3rd place, bronze medalist(s)	Salim Keddar	Algeria	3:46.31	
4	Ronald Kwemoi	Kenya	3:47.02	
5	Youssouf Hiss Bachir	Djibouti	3:47.23	
6	Abdessalem Ayouni	Tunisia	3:47.64	
7	Aman Kadi	Ethiopia	3:48.01	
8	Tesfu Tewelde	Eritrea	3:48.75	
9	Mulugeta Asefa	Ethiopia	3:49.35	
10	Dumisane Hlaselo	South Africa	3:51.64	
11	Alex Ngouare Moissi	Republic of the Congo	3:53.55	
12	Ali Udou Hassan	Somalia	3:56.78	
	James Magut	Kenya	DNS	
