= 2010 African Championships in Athletics – Men's 1500 metres =

The men's 1500 metres at the 2010 African Championships in Athletics were held on July 31 – August 1.

== Medalists ==
Gold	Silver	Bronze
Asbel Kiprop; Kenya	Amine Laâlou; Morocco	Mekonnen Gebremedhin; Ethiopia

== Results ==
=== Heats ===
Qualification: First 4 of each heat (Q) and the next 4 fastest (q) qualified for the final.

Rank	Heat	Name	Nationality	Time	Notes
1	1	Asbel Kiprop	Kenya	3:43.33	Q
2	1	Amine Laâlou	Morocco	3:43.54	Q
3	1	Aman Wote	Ethiopia	3:43.60	Q, SB
4	1	Juan van Deventer	South Africa	3:43.62	Q
5	1	Nicholas Kemboi	Kenya	3:43.63	q
6	2	Mekonnen Gebremedhin	Ethiopia	3:44.24	Q
7	2	Silas Kiplagat	Kenya	3:44.30	Q
8	2	Johan Cronje	South Africa	3:44.61	Q
9	2	Demma Daba	Ethiopia	3:44.63	Q
10	2	Hais Welday	Eritrea	3:44.67	q
11	2	Jimmy Adar	Uganda	3:45.10	q
12	1	Taoufik Makhloufi	Algeria	3:45.12	q
13	2	Badr Rassioui	Morocco	3:48.82	
14	2	Barie Hhera	Tanzania	3:49.65	
15	2	Joseph Nzirorera	Rwanda	3:51.12	
16	1	John Basil	Tanzania	3:51.26	
17	1	Jean Claude Hakizimana	Burundi	3:51.65	SB
18	1	Chancy Master	Malawi	3:52.01	
19	2	Manuel Andre Antonio	Angola	3:55.07	
20	2	Youssouf His Bachir	Djibouti	3:55.71	
21	1	Daniel Nghipandulwa	Namibia	3:55.82	
22	2	Alex Fra Ngouari-Mouissi	Republic of the Congo	3:56.23	
23	1	Domingos Pascoal Moulho	Angola	4:07.71	
24	1	Nor Osman Nor	Somalia	4:23.82	
	1	Lukange Monga Wa	Democratic Republic of the Congo	DNF	
	2	Gaby Lufumba Sakila	Democratic Republic of the Congo	DNS	

=== Final ===
Rank	Name	Nationality	Time	Notes
1st place, gold medalist(s)	Asbel Kiprop	Kenya	3:36.19	CR
2nd place, silver medalist(s)	Amine Laâlou	Morocco	3:36.38	
3rd place, bronze medalist(s)	Mekonnen Gebremedhin	Ethiopia	3:36.65	
4	Silas Kiplagat	Kenya	3:36.74	
5	Nicholas Kemboi	Kenya	3:37.07	SB
6	Juan van Deventer	South Africa	3:37.99	
7	Aman Wote	Ethiopia	3:38.89	SB
8	Hais Welday	Eritrea	3:39.70	
9	Johan Cronje	South Africa	3:40.25	
10	Jimmy Adar	Uganda	3:41.00	
11	Demma Daba	Ethiopia	3:43.05	
	Taoufik Makhloufi	Algeria	DNF	
