= Brahim Kaazouzi =

Moroccan middle-distance runner

Personal information
- Nationality: Moroccan
- Born: 15 June 1990 (age 36)
- Height: 1.79 m (5 ft 10 1/2 in)
- Weight: 62 kg (137 lb)

Sport
- Sport: Track and field
- Event: 800 metres

Achievements and titles
- Personal best: 1500 m: 3:33.22 min (2018)

Brahim Kaazouzi (born 15 June 1990) is a Moroccan middle-distance runner who specialises in the 1500 metres. He broke into the world's top 100 athletes in the 2014 season. He represented his country at the 2016 Summer Olympics. He gained selection for Morocco at the 2016 Summer Olympics through a former personal best run of 3:35.76 minutes in 2016.

He qualified to represent Morocco at the 2020 Summer Olympics.

== Personal bests ==
Outdoor

- 1500 metres – 3:33.22 min (Rabat 2018)
- 3000 metres – 7:41.88 min (Rabat 2017)
- 5000 metres – 13:16.98 min (Carquefou 2017)

Indoor

- 1500 metres – 3:36.95 min (Liévin 2018)
- 3000 metres – 7:50.33 min (Metz 2017)

All information from All Athletics.

== International competitions ==
Year	Competition	Venue	Position	Event	Notes
2016	Olympic Games	Rio de Janeiro, Brazil	13th (sf)	1500 m	3:48.66
2017	Islamic Solidarity Games	Baku, Azerbaijan	3rd	1500 m	3:38.24
2017	Jeux de la Francophonie	Abidjan, Ivory Coast	2nd	1500 m	3:47.13
2017	World Championships	London, United Kingdom	—	5000 m	DNF
2018	World Indoor Championships	Birmingham, United Kingdom	14th (h)	1500 m	3:47.65
2018	Mediterranean Games	Tarragona, Spain	1st	1500 m	3:37.14
2018	African Championships	Asaba, Nigeria	14th (h)	1500 m	3:51.45^{1}
2019	Arab Championships	Cairo, Egypt	2nd	1500 m	3:43.87

^{1}Did not start in the final
