= Hicham Ouladha =

Moroccan middle-distance runner

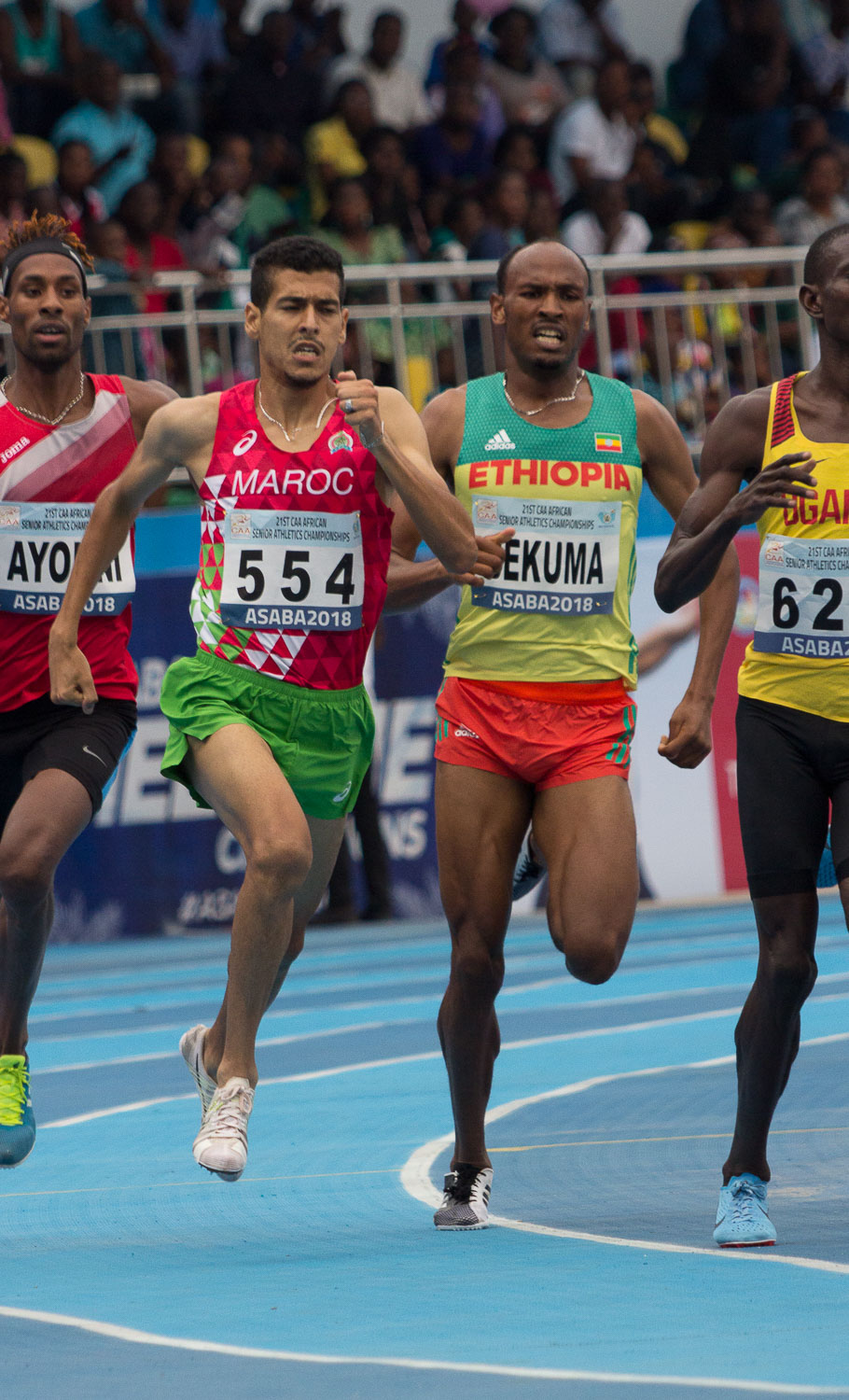
- Hicham Ouladha (l) at the 2018 African Championships

Personal information
- Born: 31 January 1995 (age 31)

Sport
- Country: Morocco
- Sport: Athletics
- Event: 1500 metres
Medal record
Men's athletics
Representing Morocco
Mediterranean Games
Bronze medal – third place	2026 Taranto	10000 m

Hicham Ouladha (born 31 January 1995) is a Moroccan runner who specializes in the 1500 metres.

He won the bronze medal at the 2017 Jeux de la Francophonie, finished ninth at the 2018 African Championships and fifth at the 2019 African Games. He also became Moroccan champion in 2018 and 2019.

His personal best time is 3:35.35 minutes, achieved in July 2018 in Rabat.
