= Asbel Kiprop =

Kenyan middle-distance runner

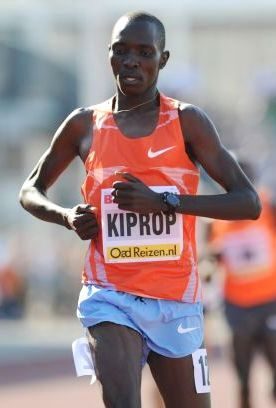
- Kiprop at the 2009 FBK Games

Personal information
- Nationality: Kenyan
- Born: 30 June 1989 (age 37) Keiyo District, Kenya
- Height: 1.88 m (6 ft 2 in)
- Weight: 62 kg (137 lb)

Sport
- Sport: Track and field
- Events: 800 metres, 1500 metres

Achievements and titles
- Personal bests: 800 meters: 1:43.15; 1500 meters: 3:26.69; Mile 3:48.50
Medal record
Men's athletics
Representing Kenya
| Event | 1st | 2nd | 3rd |
|---|---|---|---|
| Olympic Games | 1 | 0 | 0 |
| World Championships | 3 | 0 | 0 |
| African Championships in Athletics | 1 | 1 | 1 |
| All-Africa Games | 1 | 0 | 0 |
| Total | 6 | 1 | 1 |
Olympic Games
| Gold medal – first place | 2008 Beijing | 1500 m |
World Championships
| Gold medal – first place | 2011 Daegu | 1500 m |
| Gold medal – first place | 2013 Moscow | 1500 m |
| Gold medal – first place | 2015 Beijing | 1500 m |
All-Africa Games
| Gold medal – first place | 2007 Algiers | 1500 m |
African Championships
| Gold medal – first place | 2010 Nairobi | 1500 m |
| Silver medal – second place | 2014 Marrakesh | 1500 m |
| Bronze medal – third place | 2008 Addis Ababa | 800 m |

Asbel Kipruto Kiprop (born 30 June 1989) is a Kenyan middle-distance runner, who specialises in the 1500 metres. He was awarded the 1500 m gold medal at the 2008 Summer Olympics after the original winner, Rashid Ramzi, tested positive for doping. Kiprop has won three World Championship titles in the event, in 2011, 2013 and 2015. Kiprop failed his own doping test in November 2017 and received a four-year doping ban.

He won his first major title at the 2007 All-Africa Games, taking the 1500 m gold medal, and also won the event at the 2010 African Championships in Athletics, improving upon a bronze medal performance from 2008. His personal best for the distance is 3:26.69.

== Career ==
The 2007 season became his breakthrough year, when he won junior race gold medal at the 2007 IAAF World Cross Country Championships and then the 1500 m gold at the All-Africa Games. He ran a personal best to finish fourth in the 1500 m at the 2007 World Championships in Osaka. In recognition of his achievements, he won the Most Promising Sportsman of the Year category at the 2007 Kenyan Sports Personality of the Year awards.

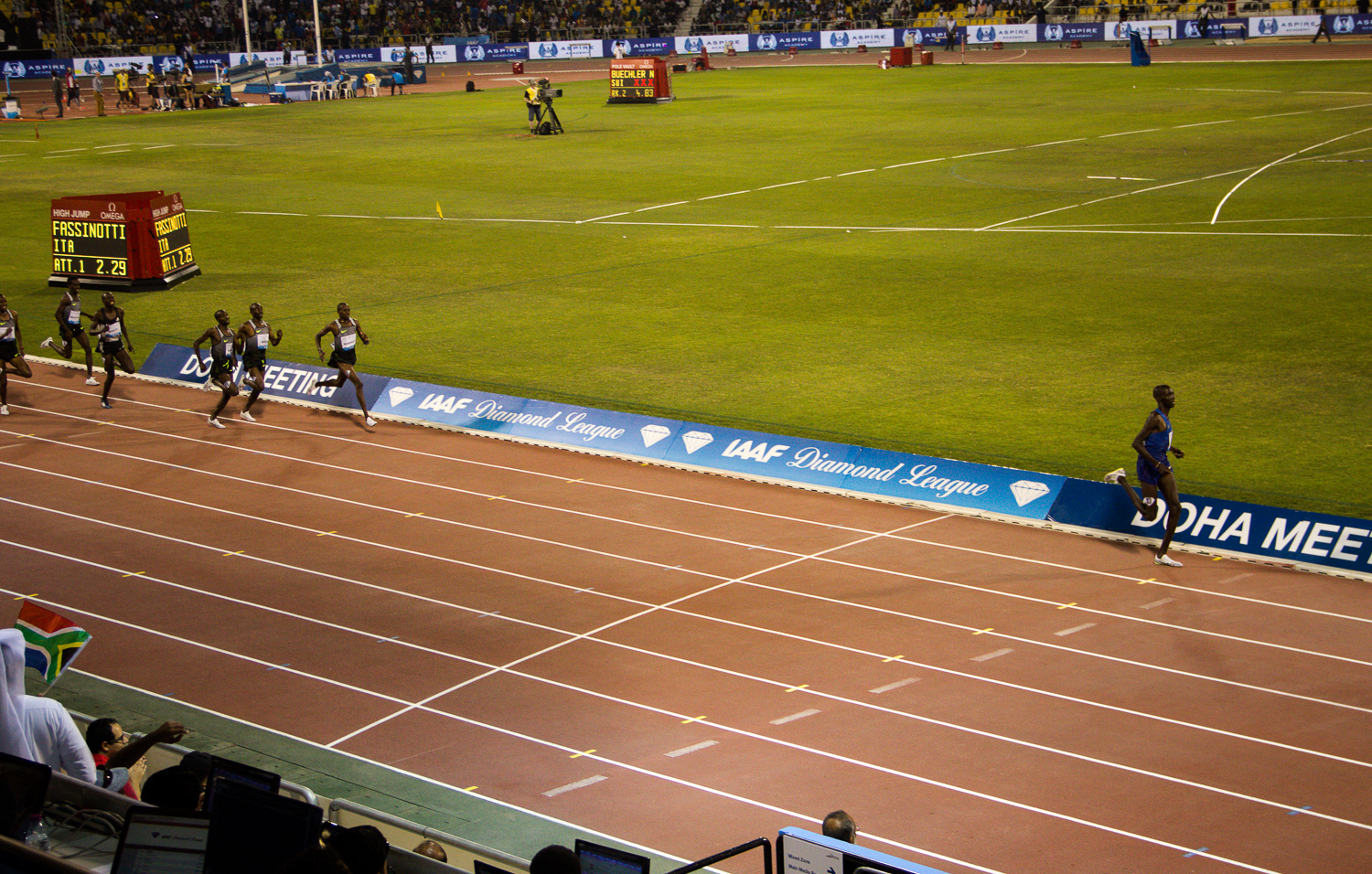
Asbel Kiprop winning the 1500m at the 2016 Doha Diamond League Meeting

He ran at the 2008 African Championships in Athletics and took the bronze medal in the 800 m and came fourth in the 1500 m race. At the 2008 Beijing Olympics, Kiprop was narrowly beaten by Bahraini Rashid Ramzi for the gold medal. However, Kiprop was awarded the gold medal after Ramzi tested positive for CERA, a banned substance which is a newer version of the more commonly known EPO. He is the youngest ever winner of the title, a record previously held by Arnold Jackson since 1912. Kiprop has stated he is not very happy about the way he won the gold medal. He ended the year with a silver medal at the 2008 IAAF World Athletics Final, finishing behind the African champion Haron Keitany.

At the 2009 World Athletics Championships, in Berlin, Kiprop disappointed many when he finished fourth for the second time in the 1500 m. Kiprop also participated in the 800 m but was eliminated in the semi-finals.

He won the gold in the 1500 m at the 2010 African Championships in Athletics, running a championship record time of 3:36.19 to win in Nairobi. He competed on the 2010 IAAF Diamond League circuit that year and after victories at the Bislett Games, Prefontaine Classic and British Grand Prix, he went on to secure the inaugural 1500 m Diamond League title with a win at the final event at the Memorial van Damme. He represented Africa at the 2010 IAAF Continental Cup, but managed only sixth place.

He ran at the 2011 Great Edinburgh Cross Country in January, taking second place in the short race behind Eliud Kipchoge. Later that year he became world champion over 1500 m, defeating his Kenyan rival, Silas Kiplagat at the 2011 World Championships in Athletics. Kiprop ran the final 800 meters of the race well under 1:50 and the final 400 meters in 51 seconds plus. Kiprop was leading in the rankings of the 2011 IAAF Diamond League, having won at the Bislett Games Dream Mile and placed second at the Shanghai, Paris and Stockholm meets. However, at the event final at the Weltklasse Zürich, he managed only seventh while Nixon Chepseba won to take the seasonal title.

He had his best cross country race since he was a junior runner at the Edinburgh race in 2012, defeating a field which contained Kipchoge and Kenenisa Bekele.

In July 2013, he won the Herculis (Monaco Diamond League) 1500 in a time of 3:27.72, making him the fourth fastest man ever at the distance yet still not achieving the meet record. On 18 August, at the IAAF World Championships in Moscow, Kiprop won the 1500 metres in 3:36.28.

In 2015, Kiprop set a meeting record for 1500 metres at the Monaco Diamond League event in a time of 3:26.69. This puts him third on the all-time list over the distance. One month later, Kiprop won his third consecutive 1500 meter world championship title in Beijing.

In 2016, Kiprop failed to win another Olympic Title in Rio, finishing in a disappointing sixth place. He blamed his shock loss on the fact that his fellow countryman Elijah Manangoi was not present in the race. Matthew Centrowitz of the USA won the race in a time of 3:50:00, one of the slowest winning 1500m times in Olympic history.

== Doping implications ==
On 2 May 2018 it was first reported that Kiprop had tested positive for the banned performance-enhancing substance EPO in November 2017. The test results were later confirmed by the IAAF's Athletics Integrity Unit. Kiprop maintained that he would fight to prove his innocence, but he was found guilty and given a four-year doping ban in April 2019.

In April 2019, he threatened to harm the IAAF and National Police Service by saying on Twitter "I pray to National Police Service to dismiss me Now. Before I use their machinery to earn myself Justice. Kindly. IAAF come take your medals."

== Personal life ==
Kiprop is from Kaptinga village, near Eldoret. He is a son of David and Julia Kebenei. His father David Kebenei was also an athlete, who participated in the 1987 All-Africa Games in Kenya and finished fourth in the 1500 metres race. Kiprop started running at the age of 13, while at Simat School. Later he dropped out of high-school to concentrate on training. Kiprop trains at the Kipchoge Keino High Performance Training Centre in Eldoret. He was, however, expelled from the camp in 2009 for breaking the rules by bringing his girlfriend to the centre. His younger brother Victor Kipchirchir Kebenei is also a 1500 metres runner.

After being handed a 4-year ban for doping violations, Kiprop turned to his close friends for support. This led to a release of a semi-nude show that publicly displayed the adultery between Kiprop and his friend's wife. "I was desperate. It is too much. I wanted attention. I hate what I am feeling. When people tell me not to post how I am feeling on social media, I do not know how to stop,” Kiprop states.

Kiprop has stated his first name, Asbel, means determined.

== Statistics ==
=== Personal bests ===
| Distance | Time | Place | Date |
|---|---|---|---|
| 800 metres | 1:43.15 | Monaco | 2011-07-22 |
| 1500 metres | 3:26.69 | Monaco | 2015-07-17 |
| One mile | 3:48.50 | Eugene | 2009-06-07 |
| 3000 metres | 7:42.32 | Turin | 2007-06-08 |

All Information taken from IAAF profile.

== Competition record ==
| Year | Competition | Venue | Position | Event | Notes |
Representing Kenya
| 2007 | World Cross Country Championships | Mombasa, Kenya | 1st | Junior race | |
| 2007 | All-Africa Games | Algiers, Algeria | 1st | 1500 m | 3:38.97 |
| 2007 | World Championships | Osaka, Japan | 4th | 1500 m | 3:35.24 |
| 2008 | African Championships | Addis Ababa, Ethiopia | 3rd | 800 m | 1:46.02 |
| 2008 | Olympic Games | Beijing, China | 1st | 1500 m | 3:33.11 |
| 2008 | World Athletics Final | Stuttgart, Germany | 2nd | 1500 m | 3:37.93 |
| 2009 | World Championships | Berlin, Germany | 19th (sf) | 800 m | 1:52.05 |
| 2009 | World Championships | Berlin, Germany | 4th | 1500 m | 3:36.47 |
| 2010 | African Championships | Nairobi, Kenya | 1st | 1500 m | 3:36.19 |
| 2011 | World Championships | Daegu, South Korea | 1st | 1500 m | 3:35.69 |
| 2012 | Olympic Games | London, United Kingdom | 12th | 1500 m | 3:43.83 |
| 2013 | World Championships | Moscow, Russia | 1st | 1500 m | 3:36.28 |
| 2014 | IAAF World Relays | Nassau, Bahamas | 1st | 4 × 1500 m | 14:22.22 |
| 2015 | World Championships | Beijing, China | 1st | 1500 m | 3:34.40 |
| 2016 | Olympic Games | Rio de Janeiro, Brazil | 6th | 1500 m | 3:50.87 |
| 2017 | World Championships | London, United Kingdom | 9th | 1500 m | 3:37.24 |
