= Paulo Amotun Lokoro =

South Sudanese track and field athlete

Paulo Amotun
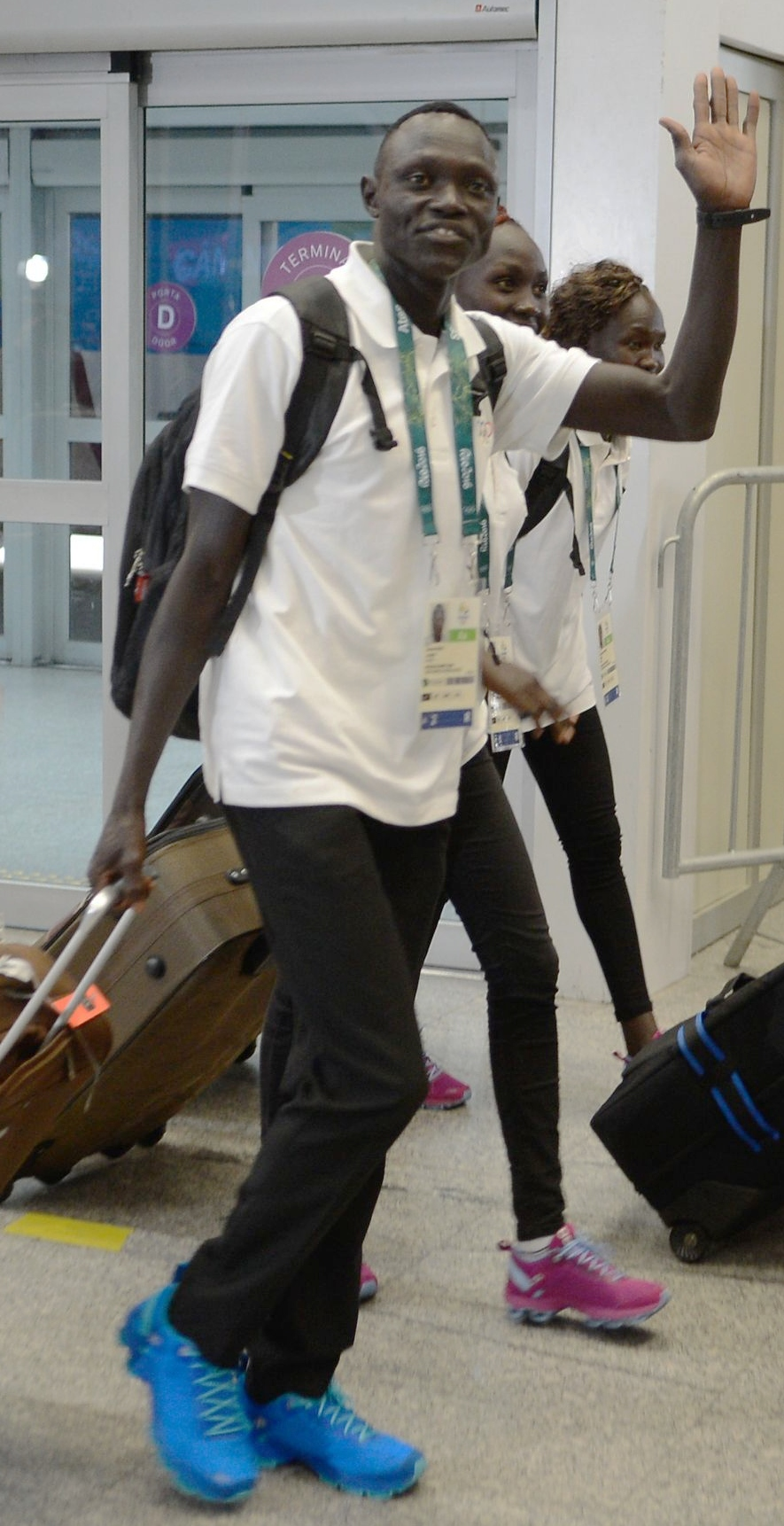
- Amotun at the 2016 Olympics

Personal information
- Full name: Paulo Amotun Lokoro
- Born: 10 July 1993 (age 33) South Sudan
- Height: 170 cm (5 ft 7 in)
- Weight: 61 kg (134 lb)

Sport
- Country: South Sudan
- Sport: Athletics
- Event: 1,500 m
- Club: Tegla Loroupe Foundation
- Coached by: Tegla Loroupe

Achievements and titles
- Personal best: 3:44.10 (2019)
- Updated on 11 June 2016

Paulo Amotun Lokoro (born 10 July 1993) is a South Sudanese track and field athlete now living in Kenya. He specialises in the 1,500 metres event. Lokoro was selected as one of the ten members of the Refugee Olympic Team (ROT) for the 2016 Summer Olympics in Rio de Janeiro, Brazil and one of the 29 ROT members at the 2020 Summer Olympics in Tokyo, Japan. Originally a cattle farmer in southern Sudan, he fled his home to Kenya in 2006 to escape war.

== Early life ==
Amotun Lokoro was born on 10 July 1993 in Southern Sudan, an area which was to become South Sudan upon independence. He was originally a cattle farmer before he fled war in South Sudan in 2006 to join his parents who had already fled to the Kakuma Refugee Camp in Kenya. Although South Sudan was relatively peaceful in 2006 following the end of the Second Sudanese Civil War and the South Sudanese wars of independence, there were still clashes including the Battle of Malakal.

== Career ==
Amotun Lokoro was selected as part of the Refugee Olympic Team for the 2016 Summer Olympics in Rio de Janeiro, Brazil. He was entered in the men's 1,500 m and took part in the heats on 16 August 2016. He finished 11th in heat two in a time of four minutes 3.96 seconds and did not advance to the semi-finals.

He was again selected as part of the Refugee Olympic Team for the 2020 Summer Olympics in Tokyo, Japan. He was entered in the men's 1,500 m and took part in the heats on 3 August 2021. He finished 13th in heat three in a time of three minutes 51.78 seconds and did not advance to the semi-finals.

== Competitions ==
| Year | Competition | Venue | Position | Event | Notes |
Representing Refugee Athletes
| 2016 | Olympic Games | Rio de Janeiro, Brazil | 11th (h) | 1500 m | 4:03.96 |
| 2017 | World Relays | Nassau, Bahamas | 7th | 4 x 800 m | 8:12.57 |
| 2017 | Asian Indoor and Martial Arts Games | Ashgabat, Turkmenistan | Finalist | 1500 m | DNS |
| 2018 | World Half Marathon Championships | Valencia, Spain | 124th | Half Marathon | 1:09:31 |
| 2018 | African Championships | Asaba, Nigeria | 15th | 1500 m | 4:03.44 |
| 2019 | World Championships | Doha, Qatar | 42nd (h) | 1500 m | 3:48.98 |
| 2021 | Olympic Games | Tokyo, Japan | 43rd (h) | 1500 m | 3:51.78 |
