= Taresa Tolosa =

Ethiopian middle-distance runner

Personal information
- Born: 15 June 1998 (age 27)

Sport
- Sport: Athletics
- Event: 1500 metres

Taresa Tolosa Bekuma (born 15 June 1998) is an Ethiopian middle-distance runner who competes primarily in the 1500 metres. He represented his country at the 2017 World Championships without finishing his heat. A year earlier he won the silver medal at the 2016 World U20 Championships.

== International competitions ==
Year	Competition	Venue	Position	Event	Notes
Representing Ethiopia
2016	African Championships	Durban, South Africa	5th	1500 m	3:42.23
2016	World U20 Championships	Bydgoszcz, Poland	2nd	1500 m	3:48.77
2017	World Championships	London, United Kingdom	–	1500 m	DNF
2018	African Championships	Asaba, Nigeria	11th	1500 m	3:49.48

== Personal bests ==
- 800 metres – 1:50.74 (Hengelo 2017)
- 1500 metres – 3:34.47 (Hengelo 2017)
