= Ronald Musagala =

Ugandan runner (born 1992)

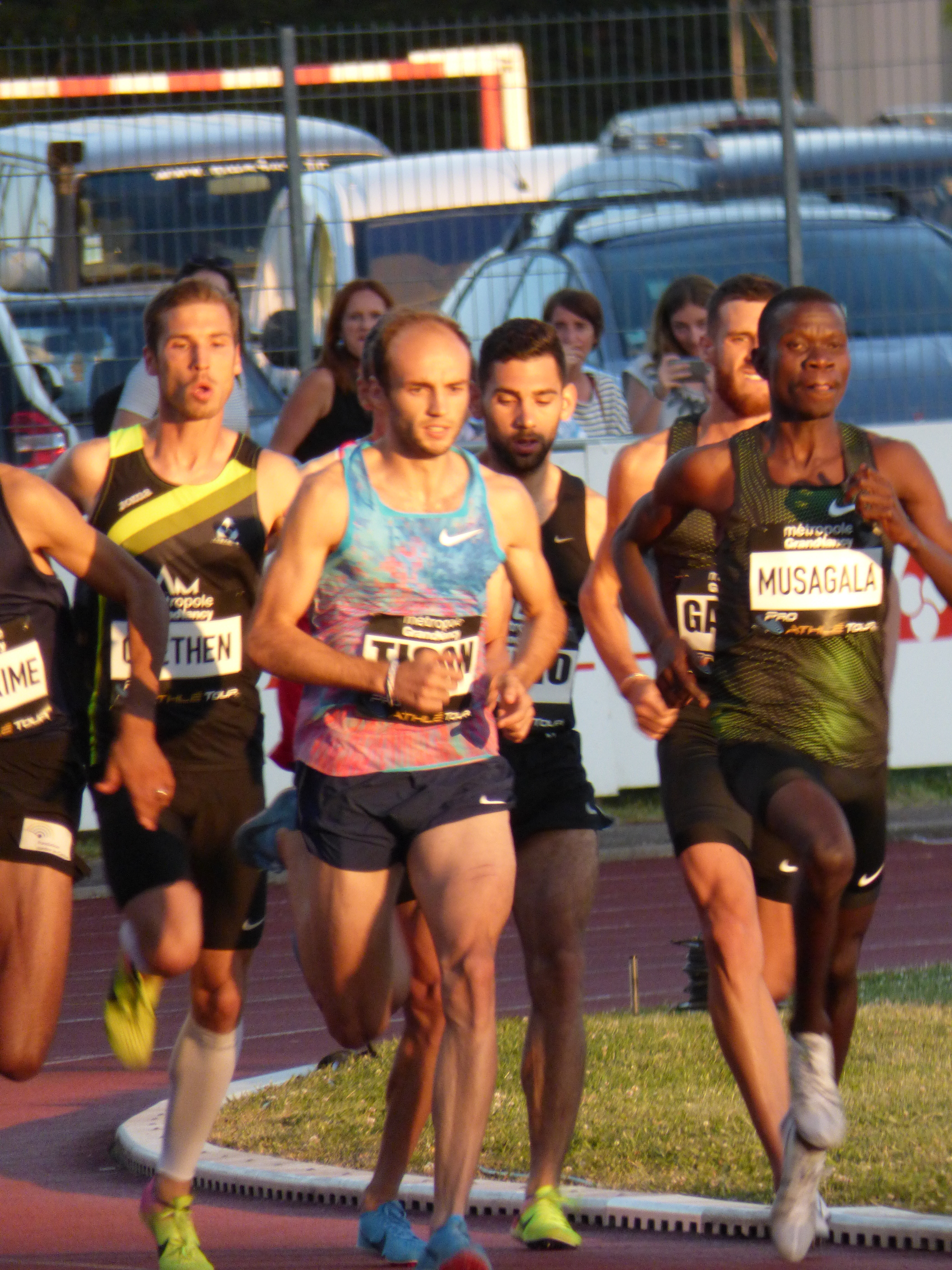
- Musagala (right) at the 2018 Meeting Stanislas

Personal information
- Born: 16 December 1992 (age 33) Iganga, Uganda

Sport
- Sport: Athletics
- Events: 800 metres, 1500 m
Medal record
Men's athletics
Representing Uganda
African Championships
Bronze medal – third place	2018 Asaba	1500 m

Ronald Musagala (born 16 December 1992 in Iganga) is a Ugandan middle-distance and long-distance runner.

At the 2013 World Championships in Moscow, he bowed out in the semi-finals of the 800 metres. He finished eighth in the 800 metres at the 2014 Commonwealth Games. He competed in the 1500 metres at the 2015 World Championships in Beijing but without advancing from the first round.

He competed at the 2020 Summer Olympics.

Musagala holds the national record in the 1500 metres.

== International competitions ==
Year	Competition	Venue	Position	Event	Notes
Representing Uganda
2013	World Championships	Moscow, Russia	14th (sf)	800 m	1:45.87
2014	Commonwealth Games	Glasgow, United Kingdom	8th	800 m	1:47.19
2014	Commonwealth Games	Glasgow, United Kingdom	11th	1500 m	3:42.42
2015	World Championships	Beijing, China	22nd (h)	1500 m	3:42.12
2016	Olympic Games	Rio de Janeiro, Brazil	11th	1500 m	3:51.68
2017	World Championships	London, United Kingdom	21st (sf)	1500 m	3:42.01
2018	Commonwealth Games	Gold Coast, Australia	14th (h)	1500 m	3:48.62
2018	African Championships	Asaba, Nigeria	3rd	1500 m	3:36.41
2019	World Championships	Doha, Qatar	16th (sf)	1500 m	3:37.19
2021	Olympic Games	Tokyo, Japan	–	1500 m	DNF
2022	World Championships	Eugene, United States	37th (h)	1500 m	3:40.87
2024	African Games	Accra, Ghana	7th	1500 m	3:41.67
2024	African Championships	Douala, Cameroon	15th (h)	1500 m	3:49.34

== Personal bests ==
=== Outdoor ===
- 800 metres – 1:45.27 (Hengelo 2014)
- 1000 metres – 2:17.11 (Brussels 2014)
- 1500 metres – 3:30.58 (Monaco 2019)
- Mile – 3:53.04 (Oslo 2021)
- 3000 metres - 7:44.78 (Ostrava 2018)
- 5000 metres – 13:24.41 (Nijmegen 2015)
