= Mekonnen Gebremedhin =

Ethiopian middle-distance runner

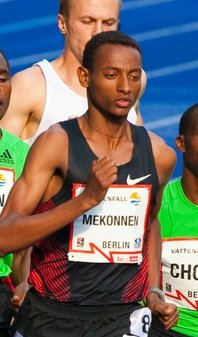
- Gebremedhin in 2011

Personal information
- Born: 11 October 1988 (age 38) Addis Ababa, Ethiopia
- Height: 1.82 m (6 ft 0 in)
- Weight: 62 kg (137 lb)
Medal record
Men's athletics
Representing Ethiopia
World Indoor Championships
Bronze medal – third place	2012 Istanbul	1500 m
All-Africa Games
Gold medal – first place	2015 Brazzaville	1500 m
African Championships
Bronze medal – third place	2010 Nairobi	1500 m
Continental Cup
Silver medal – second place	2010 Split	1500 m

Mekonnen Gebremedhin Woldegiorg (Amharic: መኮንን ገብረመድኅን; born 11 October 1988) is an Ethiopian middle-distance runner, who specializes in the 1500 metres. He is known for consistently placing close to the top three in each Diamond League competition he makes an appearance in.

Gebremedhin finished sixth at the 2008 World Indoor Championships, fourth at the 2010 IAAF World Indoor Championships and third at the 2012 IAAF World Indoor Championships. His personal best time is 3:31.57, achieved in 2010 in Berlin. He is the bronze medallist from the 2012 IAAF World Indoor Championships in Istanbul, Turkey.

== International competitions ==
Year	Competition	Venue	Position	Event	Notes
Representing Ethiopia
2003	World Youth Championships	Sherbrooke, Canada	31st (h)	800 m	1:56.04
2006	World Junior Championships	Beijing, China	21st (sf)	800 m	1:50.47
2007	World Championships	Osaka, Japan	17th (h)	1500 m	3:43.41
2008	World Indoor Championships	Valencia, Spain	6th	1500 m	3:40.42
2009	World Championships	Berlin, Germany	26th (h)	1500 m	3:43.22
2010	World Indoor Championships	Doha, Qatar	4th	1500 m	3:42.42
2010	African Championships	Nairobi, Kenya	3rd	1500 m	3:36.65
2010	Continental Cup	Split, Croatia	2nd	1500 m	3:35.70
2011	World Championships	Daegu, South Korea	7th	1500 m	3:36.81
2012	World Indoor Championships	Istanbul, Turkey	3rd	1500 m	3:45.90
2012	Olympic Games	London, United Kingdom	6th	1500 m	3:35.44
2013	World Championships	Moscow, Russia	7th	1500 m	3:37.21
2014	World Indoor Championships	Sopot, Poland	17th (h)	1500 m	3:47.22
2014	IAAF World Relays	Nassau, Bahamas	3rd	4 × 1500 m	14:41.22
2014	African Championships	Marrakesh, Morocco	4th	1500 m	3:42.65
2015	World Championships	Beijing, China	18th (sf)	1500 m	3:44.31
2015	African Games	Brazzaville, Republic of the Congo	1st	1500 m	3:45.73
2016	Olympic Games	Rio de Janeiro, Brazil	14th (sf)	1500 m	3:40.69

== Personal bests ==
Outdoor

- 800 metres – 1:46.63 (Madrid 2012)
- 1500 metres – 3:31.45 (Hengelo 2012)
- One mile – 3:49.70 (Eugene 2011)
- 3000 metres – 7:41.42 (Milan 2011)
- 3000 metres steeplechase – 8:59.06 (Kawasaki 2012)

Indoor

- 1500 metres – 3:34.89 (Birmingham 2012)
- 3000 metres – 7:41.59 (Ghent 2013)
