= Ayanleh Souleiman =

Djiboutian middle-distance runner

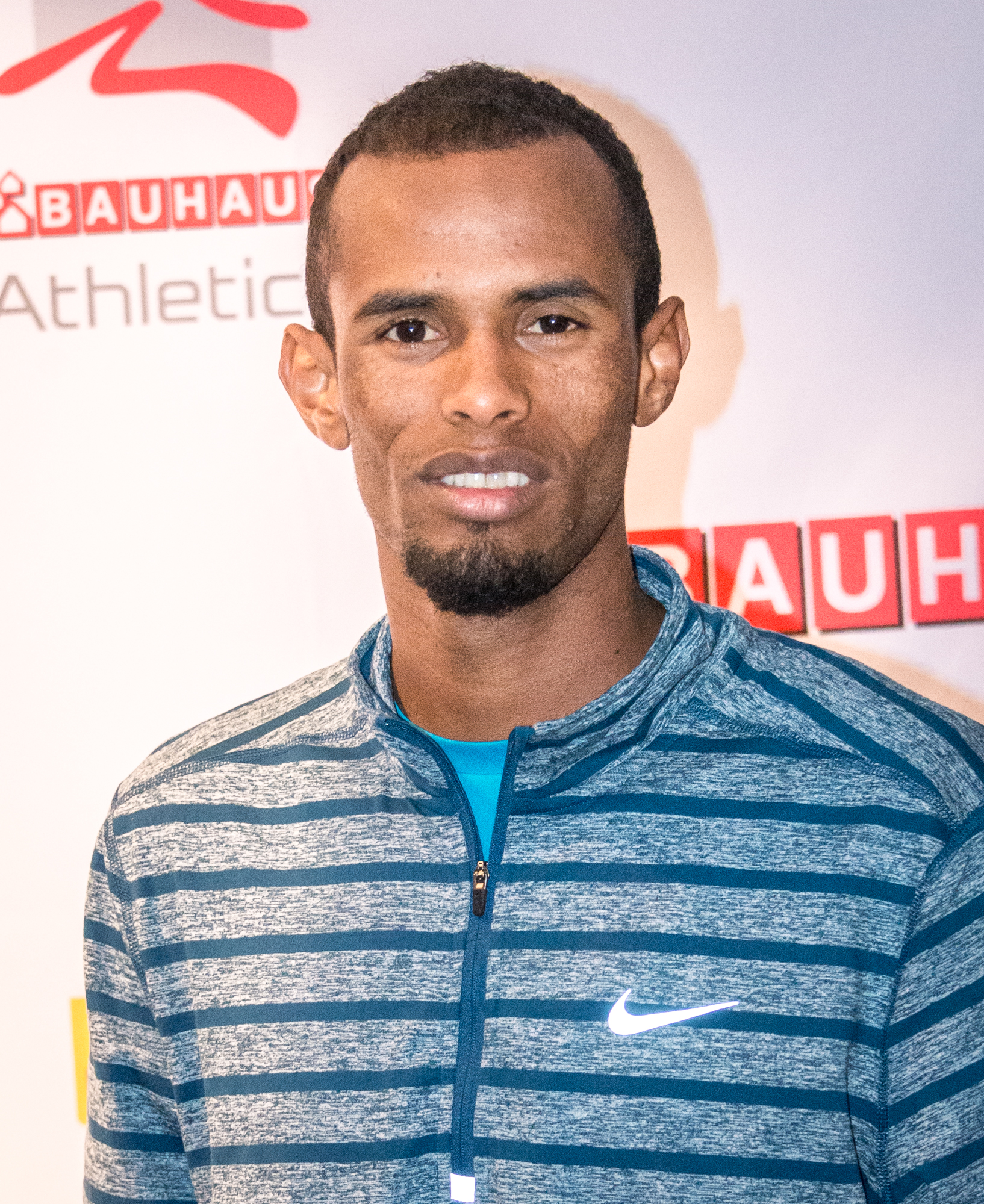
- Souleiman in 2015

Personal information
- Born: Hassan Ayanleh Souleiman; 3 December 1992 (age 33) Djibouti City, Djibouti

Sport
- Sport: Athletics
- Event: 1500 metres

Achievements and titles
- Personal bests: 800 meters: 1:42.97; 1500 meters: 3:29.58 1000 meters: 2:13.49; Mile: 3:47.32 3000 meters: 7:39.81
Medal record
Men's athletics
Representing Djibouti
World Championships
Bronze medal – third place	2013 Moscow	800 m
World Indoor Championships
Gold medal – first place	2014 Sopot	1500 m
African Games
Silver medal – second place	2019 Rabat	1500 m
African Championships
Gold medal – first place	2014 Marrakesh	1500 m
Silver medal – second place	2012 Porto-Novo	1500 m
Pan Arab Games
Gold medal – first place	2011 Doha	1500 m
Arab Championships
Gold medal – first place	2013 Doha	1500 m
Gold medal – first place	2015 Isa Town	5000 m
Gold medal – first place	2019 Cairo	1500 m
Representing Africa
Continental Cup
Gold medal – first place	2014 Marrakesh	1500 m
2016 IAAF Diamond League
Gold medal – first place	2016 Lausanne	1000 m

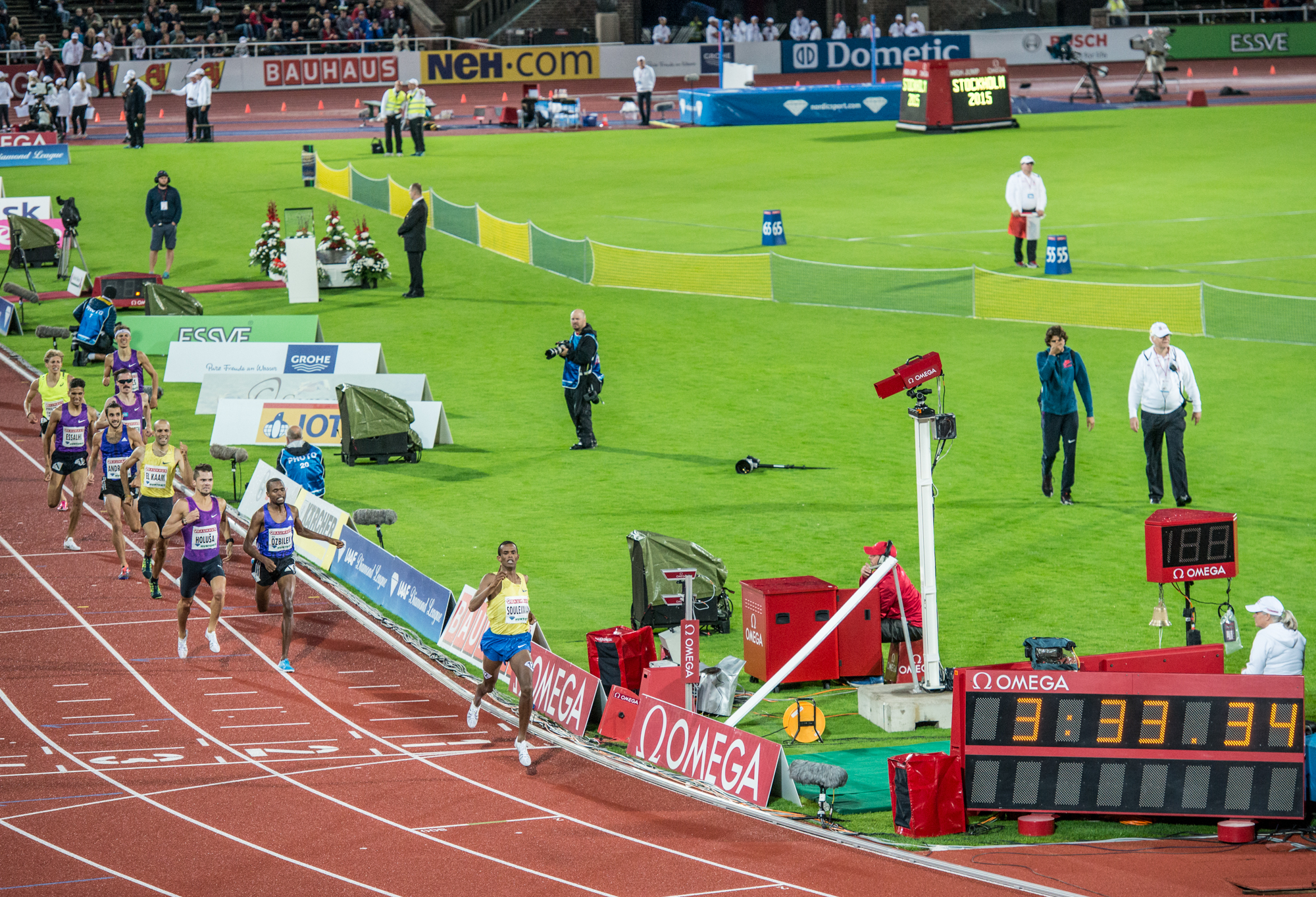
Ayanleh Souleiman wins in 2015 IAAF Diamond League in Stockholm.

Ayanleh Souleiman (born 3 December 1992), also known as Hassan Ayanleh (Somali: Xasan Ayaanle Saleebaan), is a Djiboutian middle-distance runner who specialises in the 1500 metres. He is the Djiboutian record holder for the distance, with his best of 3:29.58 minutes, as well as being the 3000 metres holder with 7:42.22 minutes. He also holds the indoor world record for the 1000-meter which he achieved at the 2016 Globengalan event in Stockholm Sweden. He also set a new IAAF Diamond League record at the IAAF Diamond League in August 2016 in the men's 1000 meters

== Running career ==
Souleiman's first international appearances came in 2009, when he placed tenth in the 1500 m at the Jeux de la Francophonie and ran in the heats of the 3000 m at the World Youth Championships.

In 2011, Souleiman won the title of 1500 m of the 2011 Pan Arab Games in Doha, in a time of 3:34.32, to win his country's first medal in this competition. He also placed sixth in the 1500 m at the 2011 All-Africa Games.

The following season saw him appear on the global scene, as he reached fifth in the final at the 2012 IAAF World Indoor Championships. His first major medal followed at the 2012 African Championships in Athletics where he claimed the silver medal in the 1500 m.

Souleiman set the Djiboutian national indoor record in the 3000 m at the Indoor Flanders Meeting in February 2013, coming third with a time of 7:39.81 minutes. In June 2013 he ran a national record at 800 m at a meet in Sweden.

Souleiman won the bronze medal at the 2013 World Championships in Athletics held in Moscow in August 2013, finishing behind Mohammed Aman of Ethiopia and Nick Symmonds of the United States.

In 2014, Souleiman also won the Bowerman Mile at the Prefontaine Classic, held at Hayward Field in Oregon with a time of 3:47:32.

== Personal bests ==
- 1000 metres (indoor) – 2:14.20 (2016) WR
- 800 metres – 1:42.97 (2015) NR
- 1000 metres – 2:13.49 (2016) NR
- 1500 metres – 3:29.58 (2014) NR
- Mile run – 3:47.32 (2014) NR
- 3000 metres − 7:42.22 (2012) NR
- 1500 metres (indoor) – 3:36.13 min (2013) NR
- 3000 metres (indoor) – 7:39.81 min (2013) NR

== Achievements ==
Year	Competition	Venue	Position	Event	Notes
Representing Djibouti
2009	World Youth Championships	Brixen, Italy	17th (h)	3000 m	8:31.83
2009	Jeux de la Francophonie	Beirut, Lebanon	10th	1500 m	3:57.40
2011	African Junior Championships	Gaborone, Botswana	11th (h)	800 m	1:51.78
2011	African Junior Championships	Gaborone, Botswana	9th	1500 m	3:46.51
2011	All-Africa Games	Maputo, Mozambique	6th	1500 m	3:36.34
2011	Pan Arab Games	Doha, Qatar	1st	1500 m	3:34.32
2012	World Indoor Championships	Istanbul, Turkey	5th	1500 m	3:47.35
2012	African Championships	Porto-Novo, Benin	2nd	1500 m	3:36.34
2013	World Championships	Moscow, Russia	3rd	800 m	1:43.76
2013	World Championships	Moscow, Russia	11th (sf)	1500 m	3:37.96
2013	Jeux de la Francophonie	Nice, France	1st	1500 m	3:57.35
2014	World Indoor Championships	Sopot, Poland	1st	1500 m	3:37.52
2014	African Championships	Marrakesh, Morocco	1st	1500 m	3:42.49
2014	Continental Cup	Marrakesh, Morocco	1st	1500 m	3:48.91
2015	World Championships	Beijing, China	— (h)	1500 m	DNF
2016	World Indoor Championships	Portland, United States	9th	1500 m	3:53.69
2016	Olympic Games	Rio de Janeiro, Brazil	11th (sf)	800 m	1:45.19
2016	Olympic Games	Rio de Janeiro, Brazil	4th	1500 m	3:50.29
2017	World Championships	London, United Kingdom	33rd (h)	1500 m	3:46.64
2018	African Championships	Asaba, Nigeria	4th	1500 m	3:37.18
2019	Arab Championships	Cairo, Egypt	1st	1500 m	3:43.84
2019	African Games	Rabat, Morocco	2nd	1500 m	3:38.44
2019	World Championships	Doha, Qatar	22nd (sf)	1500 m	3:42.23
2021	Olympic Games	Tokyo, Japan	17th (sf)	1500 m	3:37.25^{1}

^{1}Did not finish in the semifinal
