= Nicholas Kiptanui Kemboi =

Kenyan middle-distance runner

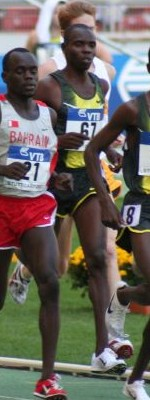
Nicholas Kemboi (67)

Nicholas Kiptanui Kemboi (born 18 December 1989 in Kericho) is a Kenyan middle-distance runner who specializes in the 1500 metres.

He competed at the 2008 Summer Olympics but did not advance past 1500 metres heats.

He holds the 1500 metres world youth best performance of 3:33.72 minutes, achieved in August 2006 in Zurich.

== Achievements ==
| Year | Competition | Venue | Position | Notes |
|---|---|---|---|---|
| 2007 | World Athletics Final | Stuttgart, Germany | 8th | 1500 m |
| 2008 | Olympic Games | Beijing, China | 11th | 1500 metres |
| 2010 | African Championships | Nairobi, Kenya | 5th | 1500 metres |

=== Personal bests ===
- 800 metres – 1:47.38 (2008)
- 1500 metres – 3:31.54 (2010)
- Mile run – 3:50.83 (2008)
