= Samuel Abate =

Ethiopian middle and long-distance runner

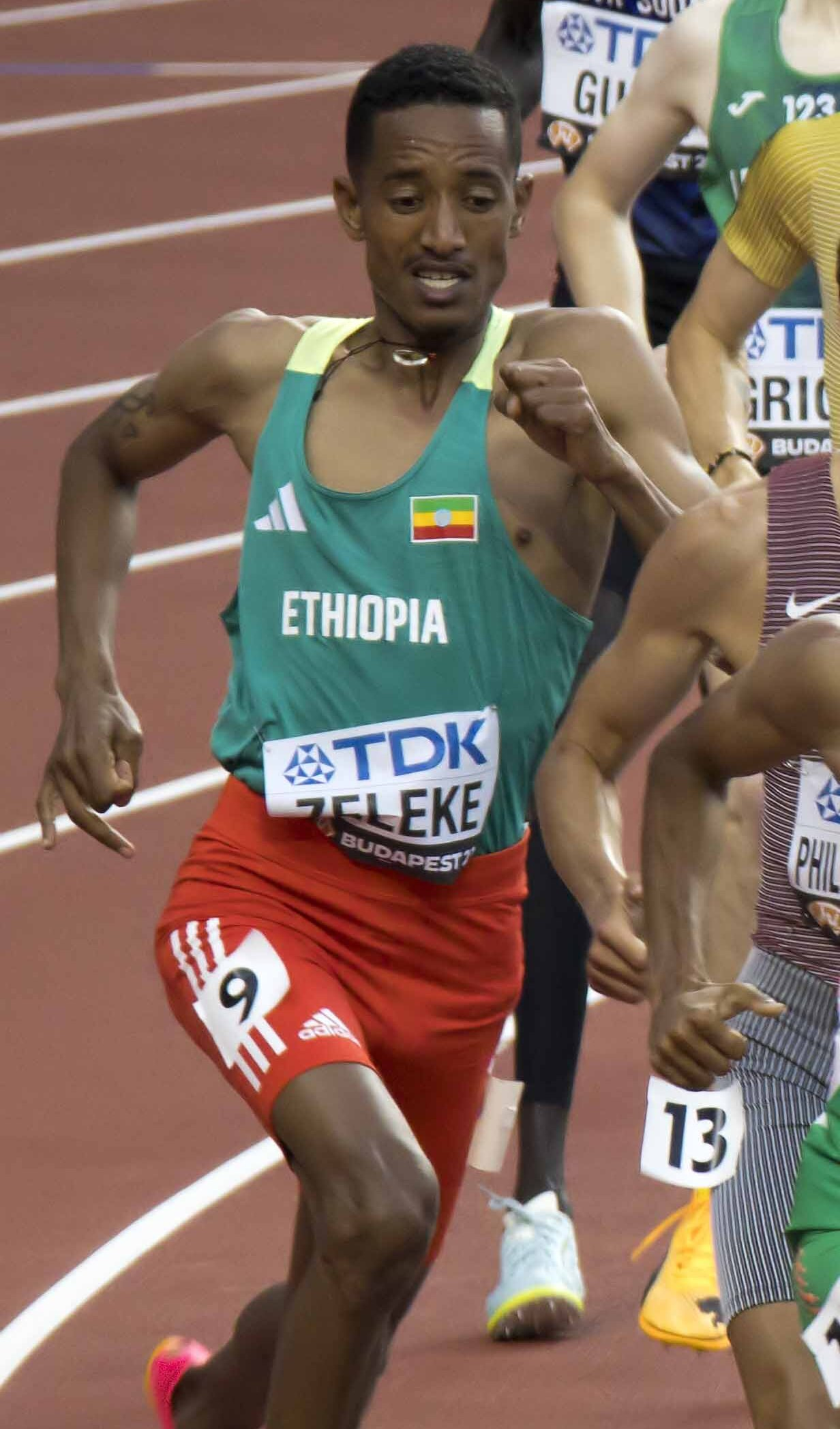
- Samuel Abate Zeleke in 2023

Personal information
- Full name: Samuel Abate Zeleke
- Nationality: Ethiopian
- Born: 9 March 1999 (age 27)

Sport
- Sport: Athletics
- Event: 1500 metres

Achievements and titles
- Personal bests: 1500 m: 3:32.80 (Hengelo 2021); Mile: 3:55.23 (Oslo 2022)

Samuel Abate Zeleke (born 9 March 1999) is an Ethiopian middle and long-distance runner, who specializes in the 1500 metres.

In January 2021, he finished third in the 1500m at a pre-Olympic trial meeting in Addis Ababa, running 3:41.60 to finish behind Teddese Lemi and Kebede Endale. In June he ran a qualifying time for the 2020 Summer Olympics with a 3:32.80 performance at the Ethiopian Olympic Trials, finishing second to Lemi in the race. He finished fifth at the Tokyo Olympics in the second heat of the 1500 metres.
