= Elijah Manangoi =

Kenyan middle-distance runner (born 1993)

Elijah Motonei Manangoi
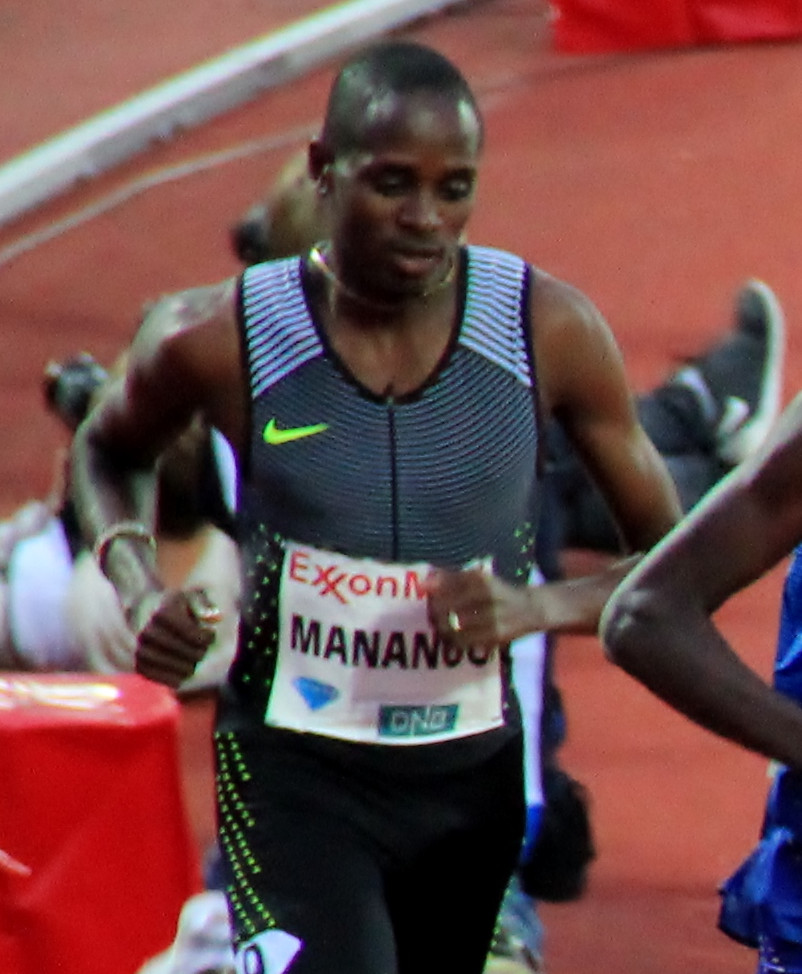
- Manangoi in 2016

Personal information
- Nationality: Kenyan
- Born: 5 January 1993 (age 33) Narok, Kenya
- Height: 1.82 m (6 ft 0 in)
- Weight: 64 kg (141 lb)

Sport
- Country: Kenya
- Sport: Track and field
- Event: 1500 metres
Medal record
Men's athletics
Representing Kenya
World Championships
Gold medal – first place	2017 London	1500 m
Silver medal – second place	2015 Beijing	1500 m
Commonwealth Games
Gold medal – first place	2018 Gold Coast	1500 m
African Championships
Gold medal – first place	2018 Asaba	1500 m
Continental Cup
Gold medal – first place	2018 Ostrava	1500 m

Elijah Motonei Manangoi (born 5 January 1993) is a Kenyan middle-distance runner. He won the gold medal in the 1500 metres at the 2017 World Athletics Championships and the silver in the same event in 2015. Manangoi also won the 1500m at the 2018 Commonwealth Games.

In 2019, the Athletics Integrity Unit banned Manangoi for two years due to whereabouts failures, as he had missed three doping tests within a 12-month period.

Manangoi was cited as one of the Top 100 most influential Africans by New African magazine in 2017.

== International competitions ==
Year	Competition	Venue	Position	Event	Notes
Representing Kenya
2014	Commonwealth Games	Glasgow, United Kingdom	12th	1500 m	3:45.47
2015	World Championships	Beijing, China	2nd	1500 m	3:34.63
2016	Olympic Games	Rio de Janeiro, Brazil	26th (h)	1500 m	3:46.83^{1}
2017	World Championships	London, Great Britain	1st	1500 m	3:33.61
2018	Commonwealth Games	Gold Coast, Australia	1st	1500 m	3:34.78
2018	African Championships	Asaba, Nigeria	1st	1500 m	3:35.20

^{1}Did not start in the semifinals

== Personal bests ==
Outdoor

- 800 metres – 1:44.15 (Birmingham 2018)
- 1500 metres – 3:28.80 (Monaco 2017)

Indoor

- 1000 metres – 2:17.09 (Stockholm 2017)
- 1500 metres – 3:37.62 (Düsseldorf 2017)
