= Sadik Mikhou =

Bahraini middle-distance runner

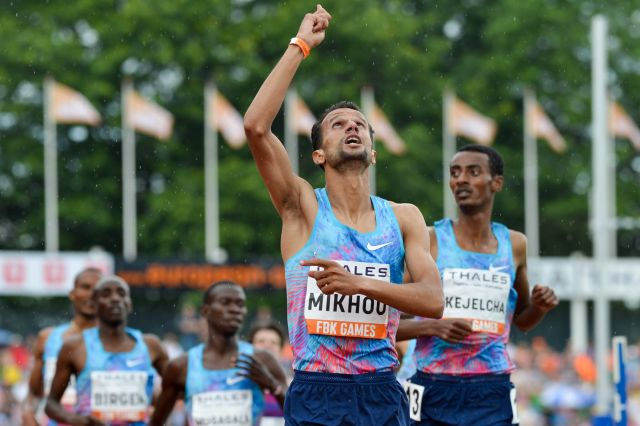
- Sadik Mikhou in 2017

Personal information
- Born: 25 July 1990 (age 35)

Sport
- Sport: Athletics
- Event: 1500 metres

Sadik Mikhou (born 25 July 1990) is a Moroccan-born middle-distance runner who has represented Bahrain internationally since 2015. He competed at the 2017 World Championships finishing sixth, and won the gold at the 2017 Islamic Solidarity Games. He previously represented Morocco before switching his sporting allegiance to Bahrain.

On 8 August 2021, the International Testing Agency confirmed that Mikhou has been provisionally suspended for receiving a blood transfusion during the Tokyo Olympics. He had previously served a two-year suspension imposed in 2018.

== International competitions ==
Year	Competition	Venue	Position	Event	Notes
Representing Morocco
2013	Arab Championships	Doha, Qatar	3rd	1500 m	3:40.81
Representing Bahrain
2017	Islamic Solidarity Games	Baku, Azerbaijan	1st	1500 m	3:36.64
2017	World Championships	London, United Kingdom	6th	1500 m	3:35.81
2018	Asian Games	Jakarta, Indonesia	–	800 m	DNF
2018	Asian Games	Jakarta, Indonesia	9th (h)	1500 m	3:50.75^{1}

^{1}Did not finish in the final

== Personal bests ==
Outdoors

- 800 metres – 1:46.55 (Rabat 2014)
- 1000 metres – 2:22.28 (Rabat 2011)
- 1500 metres – 3:31.34 (Hengelo 2017)
- 3000 metres – 7:39.02 (Paris 2016)
- 10 kilometres – 28:05 (Doha 2017)
