= Abdessalem Ayouni =

Tunisian middle-distance runner

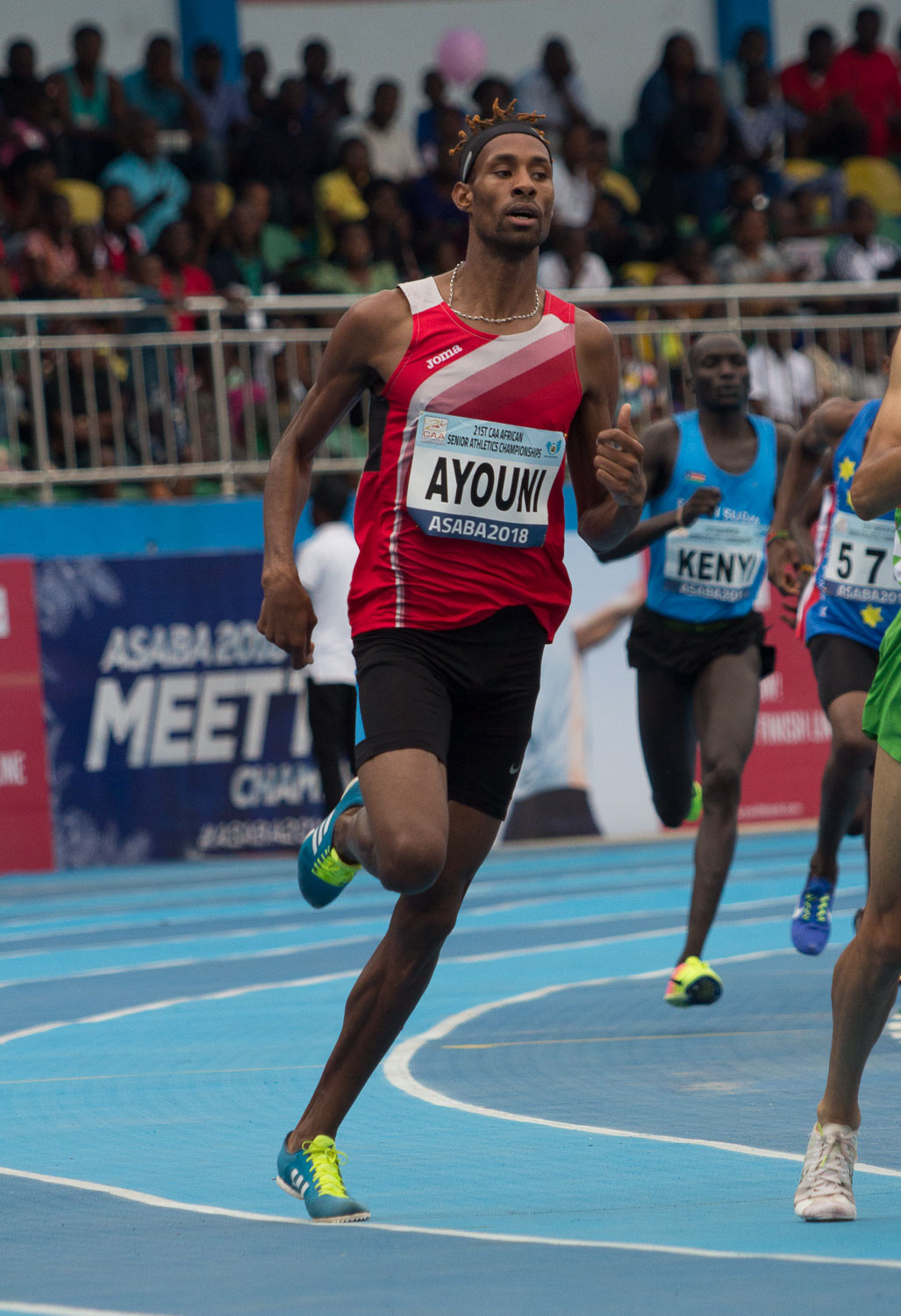
- Abdessalem Ayouni at the 2018 African Championships

Personal information
- Born: 16 May 1994 (age 32)
- Height: 1.90 m (6 ft 3 in)
- Weight: 71 kg (157 lb)

Sport
- Sport: Athletics
- Events: 800 m, 1500 m
- Club: Croissant Sportif de Regueb
- Coached by: Noureddine Kammoun

Abdessalem Ayouni "Slouma" (born 16 May 1994) is a Tunisian middle-distance runner. He represented his country in the 800 metres at the 2017 World Championships. With the personal bests of 1.44.99 he is the national record holder in the 800 metres.

== International competitions ==
Year	Competition	Venue	Position	Event	Notes
Representing Tunisia
2011	World Youth Championships	Lille, France	27th (h)	800 m	1:53.81
2012	World Junior Championships	Barcelona, Spain	15th (h)	1500 m	3:48.67
2013	Jeux de la Francophonie	Nice, France	8th	800 m	1:50.59
2014	African Championships	Marrakesh, Morocco	7th	1500 m	3:44.67
2015	African Games	Brazzaville, Republic of the Congo	6th	1500 m	3:47.64
2017	World Championships	London, United Kingdom	22nd (sf)	800 m	1:47.39
2017	Arab Championships	Radès, Tunisia	3rd	800 m	1:47.59
2018	Mediterranean Games	Tarragona, Spain	9th (h)	800 m	1:49.63
2018	Mediterranean Games	Tarragona, Spain	2nd	1500 m	3:37.35
2019	Arab Championships	Cairo, Egypt	2nd	800 m	1:51.31
2019	Arab Championships	Cairo, Egypt	6th	1500 m	3:48.39
2019	African Games	Rabat, Morocco	1st	800 m	1:45.17
2019	World Championships	Doha, Qatar	13th (sf)	800 m	1:45.80
2021	Olympic Games	Tokyo, Japan	16th (sf)	800 m	1:44.99
2022	African Championships	Port Louis, Mauritius	4th	800 m	1:46.68
2022	African Championships	Port Louis, Mauritius	5th	4 × 400 m relay	3:11.31
2022	Mediterranean Games	Oran, Algeria	4th	800 m	1:44.99
2022	Mediterranean Games	Oran, Algeria	–	1500 m	DQ
2022	World Championships	Eugene, United States	12th (sf)	800 m	1:46.08
2023	Arab Games	Oran, Algeria	3rd	800 m	1:48.19
2023	World Championships	Budapest, Hungary	31st (h)	800 m	1:46.85
2024	African Championships	Douala, Cameroon	16th (h)	800 m	1:50.61
2025	Arab Championships	Oran, Algeria	2nd	800 m	1:51.13
2025	Arab Championships	Oran, Algeria	3rd	1500 m	4:11.85
2026	African Championships	Accra, Ghana	10th (h)	800 m	1:48.13
2026	Mediterranean Games	Taranto, Italy	8th	800 m	1:47.19
2026	Mediterranean Games	Taranto, Italy	11th	1500 m	3:47.59

== Personal bests ==
Outdoor

- 800 metres – 1:44.55 (Pfungstadt, 2025) NR
- 1000 metres – 2:17.21 (Liège, 2025)
- 1500 metres – 3:36.97 (Prague, 2025)

Indoor

- 800 metres – 1:46.74 (Lyon, 2023) NR
