= Tesfu Tewelde =

Eritrean long-distance runner

Personal information
- Born: 21 July 1997 (age 28)

Sport
- Country: Eritrea
- Sport: Long-distance running

Tesfu Tewelde (born 21 July 1997) is an Eritrean long-distance runner.

In 2015, he finished in 8th place in the men's 1500 metres event at the 2015 African Games held in Brazzaville, Republic of the Congo.

In 2019, he competed in the senior men's race at the 2019 IAAF World Cross Country Championships held in Aarhus, Denmark. He finished in 72nd place. In 2019, he also represented Eritrea at the 2019 African Games held in Rabat, Morocco. He competed in the men's 5000 metres event and he finished in 17th place.
