= Charles Simotwo =

Kenyan middle-distance runner

Personal information
- Full name: Charles Cheboi Simotwo
- Born: 6 May 1995 (age 31)

Sport
- Country: Kenya
- Sport: Track and Field
- Events: 800m, 1500m

Achievements and titles
- Personal bests: 800 m: 1:46.20 (Merksem 2017); 1500 m: 3:30.30 (Monaco 2021); Mile: 3:49.40 (Oslo 2021)

Charles Cheboi Simotwo (born 6 May 1995) is a Kenyan middle-distance runner.

On 6 July 2017 at the Athletissima Diamond League meeting at the Stade Olympique de la Pontaise, in Lausanne he ran 1500m in 3:32.59 as he finished second behind Aman Wote for a new personal best which would ultimately place him inside the top 10 worldwide in the year.

In 2019, Charles Simotwo injured a leg in a traffic accident that forced him to undergo surgery.

He won the 1500m on the 19 June 2021 at the Kenyan Olympic trials to secure his place at the delayed 2020 Summer Games. He won ahead of more established names such as reigning World Champion Timothy Cheruiyot, George Manangoi, Ronald Kwemoi and Bethwell Birgen, amongst others.
