= Fouad Elkaam =

Moroccan middle-distance runner

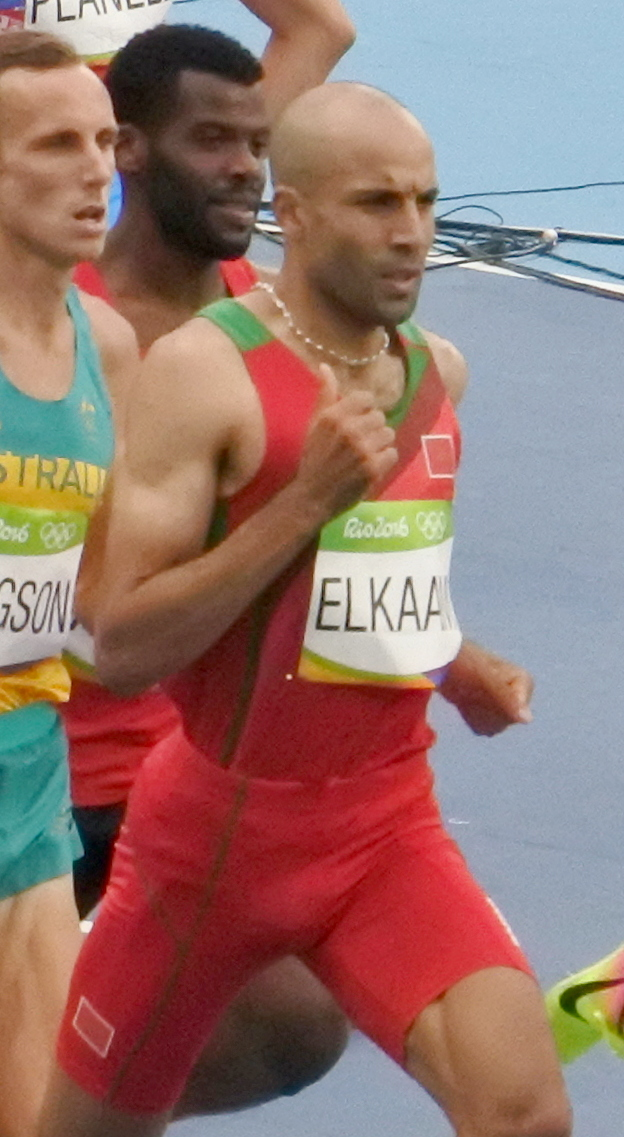
- Elkaam at the 2016 Olympics

Personal information
- Born: 27 May 1988 (age 38)
- Height: 188 cm (6 ft 2 in)
- Weight: 70 kg (154 lb)

Sport
- Country: Morocco
- Sport: Track and field
- Event: 1500 metres
- Coached by: Ahmed Ettanani, Abdellah Boukraa, Lahlou Benyounes, Mohamed Nouami
Medal record
Men's athletics
Representing Morocco
African Championships
Gold medal – first place	2016 Durban	1500 m

Fouad Elkaam (born 27 May 1988), also known as Fouad El Kaam, is a Moroccan middle-distance runner. He competed in the 1500 m event at the 2015 World Championships and 2016 Olympics. Elkaam tested positive for the stimulant methylhexaneamine in June 2011 and was subsequently handed a 6-month ban from sports. He later won the gold medal in the 1500 m event at the 2016 African Championships.
