= Ronald Kwemoi =

Kenyan long-distance runner (born 1995)

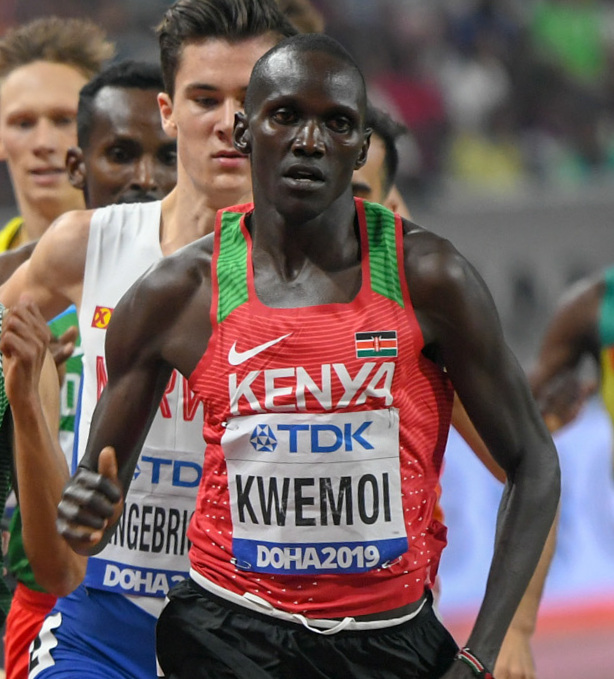
- Kwemoi at the 2019 World Athletics Championships

Personal information
- Nationality: Kenya
- Born: 19 September 1995 (age 31) Mount Elgon District, Bungoma County, Kenya

Sport
- Sport: Athletics
- Event: 1500 m
Medal record
Men's athletics
Representing Kenya
Olympic Games
Silver medal – second place	2024 Paris	5000 m
African Championships
Bronze medal – third place	2014 Marrakesh	1500 m
Commonwealth Games
Silver medal – second place	2014 Glasgow	1500 metres
- Updated on 26 August 2016

Ronald Chebolei Kwemoi (Japanese: ﾛﾅﾙﾄﾞ ｹﾓｲ; born 19 September 1995) is a Kenyan long-distance runner who competes in cross country running and track running events. He competes in the 5000 meters, and won the silver medal at the 2024 Summer Olympics over the distance. Earlier in his career, he specialized in 1500 metres and holds a personal best of 3:28.81 minutes set at Herculis on 18 July 2014. The time was a world junior record. He was the 2014 Kenyan champion in the event. He was a team silver medallist at the 2013 IAAF World Cross Country Championships.

== Career ==
Hailing from Mount Elgon District, Kwemoi ended his schooling in 2009 as his family could not afford the fees. He began training as a runner under coach Godwill Kipruto and around 2011 moved to Iten, a well-known centre for running in Kenya. He made his first impact as a runner at national level at the age of seventeen. He took his first victory on the Athletics Kenya circuit in Kericho. In February 2013 he entered the Kenyan junior cross country championships and won the race by six seconds. His win—on his national debut—was an upset as he was unknown beforehand and beat the more favoured Leonard Barsoton and Conseslus Kipruto, a world junior champion. This led to his international debut for Kenya and he placed ninth in the junior race at the 2013 IAAF World Cross Country Championships. Although he was beaten by his compatriots Barsoton and Kipruto at the event, his placing meant Kenya shared in the team silver medals behind Ethiopia.

After his cross country performances, he travelled to Japan and trained in track events. That season, he won a 1500 metres in with a best of 3:45.39 minutes and set a best of 13:41.99 minutes for the 5000 metres. He joined up with the Komori corporate running team in 2014 and focused on the 1500 m. He won his opening race of that year at the Kanaguri Memorial, improving to 3:42.45 minutes, then improved again to win at the Hyogo Relays. Wins at the East Japan championship and North Rift Valley championship preceded his first Kenyan national title, which he won in Nairobi in 3:34.6 minutes – knocking eight seconds off his previous best. He extended his unbeaten streak in the 1500 m at the Athletissima 2014 Diamond League meeting – there he caused an upset by winning in 3:31.48 minutes to beat world championship medallists Silas Kiplagat, Matt Centrowitz and Abdalaati Iguider. His time was the fastest by a junior (under-20) athlete for nearly ten years and placed him fourth on the all-time junior lists.

In what was called one of the greatest races in the history of the 1500 metres, Kwemoi was an up close spectator to a world record attempt by Asbel Kiprop at the 2014 Herculis meet in Monaco. The record attempt failed but turned into a highly competitive race, with 9 athletes setting personal bests. While Silas Kiplagat ended up beating Kiprop in 3:27.64, coming from sixth place with 200 to go to finish a few steps behind in third, Kwemoi improved his personal best and improved upon the world junior record with a 3:28.81. The time also tied Mo Farah as the number 7 1500 metres of all time.

From the beginning of 2016 he went under the coaching of the Italian Renato Canova, looking for moving to the longer distance of 5000m.

In October 2024, it was announced that he had signed up for the inaugural season of the Michael Johnson founded Grand Slam Track.

In April 2026, World Athletics rejected an application to switch Kwemoi's nationality to Turkey, describing it as part of "a coordinated recruitment strategy... to attract overseas athletes through lucrative contracts" which was not consistent with its eligibility rules and transfer of allegiance regulations.

== Statistics ==
=== Circuit performances ===
Grand Slam Track results
Slam	Race group	Event	Pl.	Time	Prize money
2025 Kingston Slam	Long distance	5000 m	5th	14:40.64	US$15,000
2025 Kingston Slam	Long distance	3000 m	4th	8:04.12	US$15,000
2025 Miami Slam	Long distance	3000 m	6th	8:19.48	US$20,000
2025 Miami Slam	Long distance	5000 m	4th	13:46.35	US$20,000
2025 Philadelphia Slam	Long distance	3000 m	7th	8:06.03	US$6,250

=== Personal bests ===
- 1500 metres – 3:28.81 min (2014)
- Mile – 3:49.04 min (2017)
- 3000 metres – 7:28.73 min (2017)
- 5000 metres – 13:02.56 min (2024)
- 10000 metres – 27:33.94 min (2016)
- 10k Road – 27:16 min (2022)

=== International competition record ===
Year	Competition	Venue	Position	Event	Notes
2013	World Cross Country Championships	Bydgoszcz, Poland	9th	Junior race (8 km)	21:58
2013	World Cross Country Championships	Bydgoszcz, Poland	2nd	Junior team	
2017	World Championships	London, United Kingdom	9th (sf)	1500 m	3:39.47
2019	World Championships	Doha, Qatar	7th	1500 m	3:32.72
2024	Olympic Games	Paris, France	2nd	5000 m	13:15.04
