= 2014 IAAF World Indoor Championships – Men's 1500 metres =

Men's 1500 metres at the 2014 IAAF World Indoor Championships
- Venue: Ergo Arena
- Dates: 7 March (heats); 8 March (final)
- Competitors: 23 from 19 nations
- Winning time: 3:37.52

Medalists
gold medal	Ayanleh Souleiman	Djibouti
silver medal	Aman Wote	Ethiopia
bronze medal	Abdalaati Iguider	Morocco

The men's 1500 metres at the 2014 IAAF World Indoor Championships took place on 7–8 March 2014.

== Records ==
Standing records prior to the 2014 IAAF World Indoor Championships
World record	Hicham El Guerrouj (MAR)	3:31.18	Stuttgart, Germany	2 February 1997
Championship record	Haile Gebrselassie (ETH)	3:33.77	Maebashi, Japan	7 March 1999
World Leading	Mohamed Moustaoui (MAR)	3:35.00	Stockholm, Sweden	6 February 2014
African record	Hicham El Guerrouj (MAR)	3:31.18	Stuttgart, Germany	2 February 1997
Asian record	Belal Mansoor Ali (BHR)	3:36.28	Stockholm, Sweden	20 February 2007
European record	Andrés Manuel Díaz (ESP)	3:33.32	Piraeus, Greece	24 February 1999
North and Central American and Caribbean record	Galen Rupp (USA)	3:34.78	Boston, United States	26 January 2013
Oceanian record	Nick Willis (NZL)	3:35.80	Birmingham, Great Britain	20 February 2010
South American record	Agberto Guimarães (BRA)	3:42.70	Piraeus, Greece	8 March 1989

== Qualification standards ==
Indoor	Outdoor
3:41.00 or 3:58.00 (Mile)	3:34.00

== Schedule ==
Date	Time	Round
7 March 2014	12:25	Heats
8 March 2014	20:00	Final

== Results ==
=== Heats ===
Qualification: First 2 in each heat (Q) and the next 3 fastest (q) qualified for the final.

Rank	Heat	Name	Nationality	Time	Notes
1	3	Aman Wote	Ethiopia	3:36.75	Q
2	3	Abdalaati Iguider	Morocco	3:37.83	Q, SB
3	3	Will Leer	United States	3:38.02	q
4	3	Bethwell Birgen	Kenya	3:38.56	q
5	2	Ayanleh Souleiman	Djibouti	3:38.94	Q
6	2	Nick Willis	New Zealand	3:39.14	Q
7	3	İlham Tanui Özbilen	Turkey	3:39.31	q
8	3	David McCarthy	Ireland	3:39.46	
9	2	Silas Kiplagat	Kenya	3:39.70	
10	2	Chris O'Hare	Great Britain	3:40.06	
11	3	Adel Mechaal	Spain	3:41.27	
12	2	Andreas Vojta	Austria	3:42.10	
13	2	Nathan Brannen	Canada	3:42.51	
14	2	Mitja Krevs	Slovenia	3:43.22	NR
15	1	Homiyu Tesfaye	Germany	3:47.07	Q
16	1	Jakub Holuša	Czech Republic	3:47.20	Q
17	1	Mekonnen Gebremedhin	Ethiopia	3:47.22	
18	1	Lopez Lomong	United States	3:48.06	
19	1	Lee Emanuel	Great Britain	3:48.09	
20	2	Wesam Al-Massri	Palestine	3:53.84	NR
21	1	Omar Mohamed Abdi	Somalia	3:56.52	PB
22	3	Aitor Gomez	Gibraltar	4:07.34	NR
	1	Ioan Zaizan	Romania	DQ	R 163.2

=== Final ===
Rank	Name	Nationality	Time	Notes
1st place, gold medalist(s)	Ayanleh Souleiman	Djibouti	3:37.52	
2nd place, silver medalist(s)	Aman Wote	Ethiopia	3:38.08	
3rd place, bronze medalist(s)	Abdalaati Iguider	Morocco	3:38.21	
4	İlham Tanui Özbilen	Turkey	3:39.10	
5	Jakub Holuša	Czech Republic	3:39.23	
6	Will Leer	United States	3:39.60	
7	Homiyu Tesfaye	Germany	3:39.90	
8	Bethwell Birgen	Kenya	3:40.66	
	Nick Willis	New Zealand	DQ	R 163.3(b)
