= 2013 World Championships in Athletics – Men's 1500 metres =

Men's 1500 metres at the 2013 World Championships
- Venue: Luzhniki Stadium
- Dates: 14 August (heats); 16 August (semifinals); 18 August (final)
- Competitors: 37 from 25 nations
- Winning time: 3:36.28

Medalists
gold medal	Asbel Kiprop; Kenya
silver medal	Matthew Centrowitz; United States
bronze medal	Johan Cronje; South Africa

Official Video

The men's 1500 metres at the 2013 World Championships in Athletics was held at the Luzhniki Stadium on 14–18 August. The winning margin was 0.50 seconds.

With three Kenyans qualified, rumors were out that there would be a fast pace for the final. That wasn't the case, first Kiprop looked around for his teammates and they weren't there. On the second lap Nixon Chepseba took off into the lead, but all eyes were on Kiprop and nobody followed. Matthew Centrowitz took up the position directly behind Kiprop on the rail, Mekonnen Gebremedhin on his shoulder. For the next two laps Chipseba ran on his own, opening up as much as a 10-meter lead. But when the running got serious everybody jockeyed for position behind Kiprop, Chipseba acting more like a blockade. Kiprop didn't really unleash his kick until 90 meters from the finish. Centrowitz moved right with him following Kiprop to the line for silver, with Johan Cronje squeezing past Chipseba on the inside to take bronze.

== Records ==
Prior to the competition, the records were as follows:

World record	Hicham El Guerrouj (MAR)	3:26.00	Rome, Italy	14 July 1998
Championship record	Hicham El Guerrouj (MAR)	3:27.65	Sevilla, Spain	24 August 1999
World Leading	Asbel Kiprop (KEN)	3:27.72	Monaco	19 July 2013
African Record	Hicham El Guerrouj (MAR)	3:26.00	Rome, Italy	14 July 1998
Asian Record	Rashid Ramzi (BHR)	3:29.14	Rome, Italy	14 July 2006
North, Central American and Caribbean record	Bernard Lagat (USA)	3:29.30	Rieti, Italy	28 August 2005
South American Record	Hudson de Souza (BRA)	3:33.25	Rieti, Italy	28 August 2005
European Record	Mo Farah (GBR)	3:28.81	Monaco	19 July 2013
Oceanian record	Nicholas Willis (NZL)	3:30.35	Monaco	20 July 2012

== Qualification standards ==
A time	B time
3:35.00	3:37.00

== Schedule ==
Date	Time	Round
14 August 2013	10:35	Heats
16 August 2013	19:05	Semifinals
18 August 2013	17:25	Final

All times are local times (UTC+4)

== Results ==
KEY:	q	Fastest non-qualifiers	Q	Qualified	NR	National record	PB	Personal best	SB	Seasonal best

=== Heats ===
Qualification: First 6 in each heat (Q) and the next 6 fastest (q) advanced to the semifinals.

Rank	Heat	Name	Nationality	Time	Notes
1	1	Asbel Kiprop	Kenya	3:38.15	Q
2	3	Nixon Chepseba	Kenya	3:38.37	Q
3	1	Abdalaati Iguider	Morocco	3:38.41	Q
4	1	Lopez Lomong	United States	3:38.48	Q
5	3	Nathan Brannen	Canada	3:38.49	Q
6	3	Mekonnen Gebremedhin	Ethiopia	3:38.55	Q
7	3	Bethwell Birgen	Kenya	3:38.60	Q
8	3	Matthew Centrowitz Jr.	United States	3:38.62	Q
9	1	Ayanleh Souleiman	Djibouti	3:38.63	Q
10	3	Homiyu Tesfaye	Germany	3:38.66	Q
11	1	Florian Carvalho	France	3:38.70	Q
12	1	Henrik Ingebrigtsen	Norway	3:38.78	Q
13	3	Bouabdellah Tahri	France	3:38.82	q
14	3	Chris O'Hare	Great Britain & N.I.	3:38.86	q
15	1	Aman Wote	Ethiopia	3:38.89	q
16	3	Mohamed Moustaoui	Morocco	3:39.20	q
17	1	Valentin Smirnov	Russia	3:39.21	q
18	2	Silas Kiplagat	Kenya	3:39.31	Q
19	2	Leonel Manzano	United States	3:39.39	Q
20	2	İlham Tanui Özbilen	Turkey	3:39.31	Q
21	1	Nick Willis	New Zealand	3:39.89	q
22	2	Johan Cronje	South Africa	3:39.95	Q
23	1	Mohamad Al-Garni	Qatar	3:40.01	
24	2	Carsten Schlangen	Germany	3:40.31	Q
25	3	Pieter-Jan Hannes	Belgium	3:40.39	
26	2	Zakaria Mazouzi	Morocco	3:40.76	Q
27	2	Zebene Alemayehu	Ethiopia	3:41.28	
28	2	Andreas Vojta	Austria	3:41.51	
29	2	Emad Noor	Saudi Arabia	3:41.68	
30	1	David Bustos	Spain	3:41.69	
31	2	Simon Denissel	France	3:42.06	
32	3	Flavio Seholhe	Mozambique	3:53.18	
33	3	Nabil Al-Garbi	Yemen	3:59.95	SB
34	2	Omar Mohamed Abdi	Somalia	4:00.00	
35	3	Omar Bachir	Niger	4:00.18	PB
36	1	Mamadou Barry	Guinea	4:16.38	SB
37	1	Thinley Tenzin	Bhutan	4:24.54	PB
	2	Imed Touil	Algeria	DNS	

=== Semifinals ===
Qualification: First 5 in each heat (Q) and the next 2 fastest (q) advanced to the final.

Rank	Heat	Name	Nationality	Time	Notes
1	2	Nixon Kiplimo Chepseba	Kenya	3:35.88	Q
2	2	Matthew Centrowitz Jr.	United States	3:35.95	Q
3	2	Mohamed Moustaoui	Morocco	3:36.12	Q
4	2	Florian Carvalho	France	3:36.26	Q
5	2	Henrik Ingebrigtsen	Norway	3:36.33	Q, SB
6	2	Homiyu Tesfaye	Germany	3:36.51	q
7	2	Nathan Brannen	Canada	3:36.59	q
8	2	Aman Wote	Ethiopia	3:36.94	
9	2	Ilham Tanui Özbilen	Turkey	3:37.07	
10	2	Bethwell Birgen	Kenya	3:37.34	
11	2	Ayanleh Souleiman	Djibouti	3:37.96	
12	1	Asbel Kiprop	Kenya	3:43.30	Q
13	1	Silas Kiplagat	Kenya	3:43.52	Q
14	1	Mekonnen Gebremedhin	Ethiopia	3:43.54	Q
15	1	Chris O'Hare	Great Britain & N.I.	3:43.58	Q
16	1	Johan Cronje	South Africa	3:43.71	Q
17	1	Lopez Lomong	United States	3:43.79	
18	1	Nicholas Willis	New Zealand	3:43.80	
19	1	Leonel Manzano	United States	3:44.00	
20	1	Bouabdellah Tahri	France	3:44.24	
21	2	Abdalaati Iguider	Morocco	3:44.36	
22	1	Carsten Schlangen	Germany	3:44.44	
23	1	Zakaria Mazouzi	Morocco	3:45.54	
24	1	Valentin Smirnov	Russia	3:46.03	

=== Final ===
The final was started at 17:25.

Rank	Lane	Name	Nationality	Time	Notes
1st place, gold medalist(s)	2	Asbel Kiprop	Kenya	3:36.28	
2nd place, silver medalist(s)	5	Matthew Centrowitz Jr.	United States	3:36.78	
3rd place, bronze medalist(s)	9	Johan Cronje	South Africa	3:36.83	
4	4	Nixon Kiplimo Chepseba	Kenya	3:36.87	
5	1	Homiyu Tesfaye	Germany	3:37.03	
6	11	Silas Kiplagat	Kenya	3:37.11	
7	8	Mekonnen Gebremedhin	Ethiopia	3:37.21	
8	6	Henrik Ingebrigtsen	Norway	3:37.52	
9	12	Mohamed Moustaoui	Morocco	3:38.08	
10	7	Nathan Brannen	Canada	3:38.09	
11	10	Florian Carvalho	France	3:39.17	
12	3	Chris O'Hare	Great Britain & N.I.	3:46.04	
