= 2018 Meeting de Paris =

- Dates: 30 June 2018
- Host city: Paris, France
- Venue: Stade Sébastien Charléty
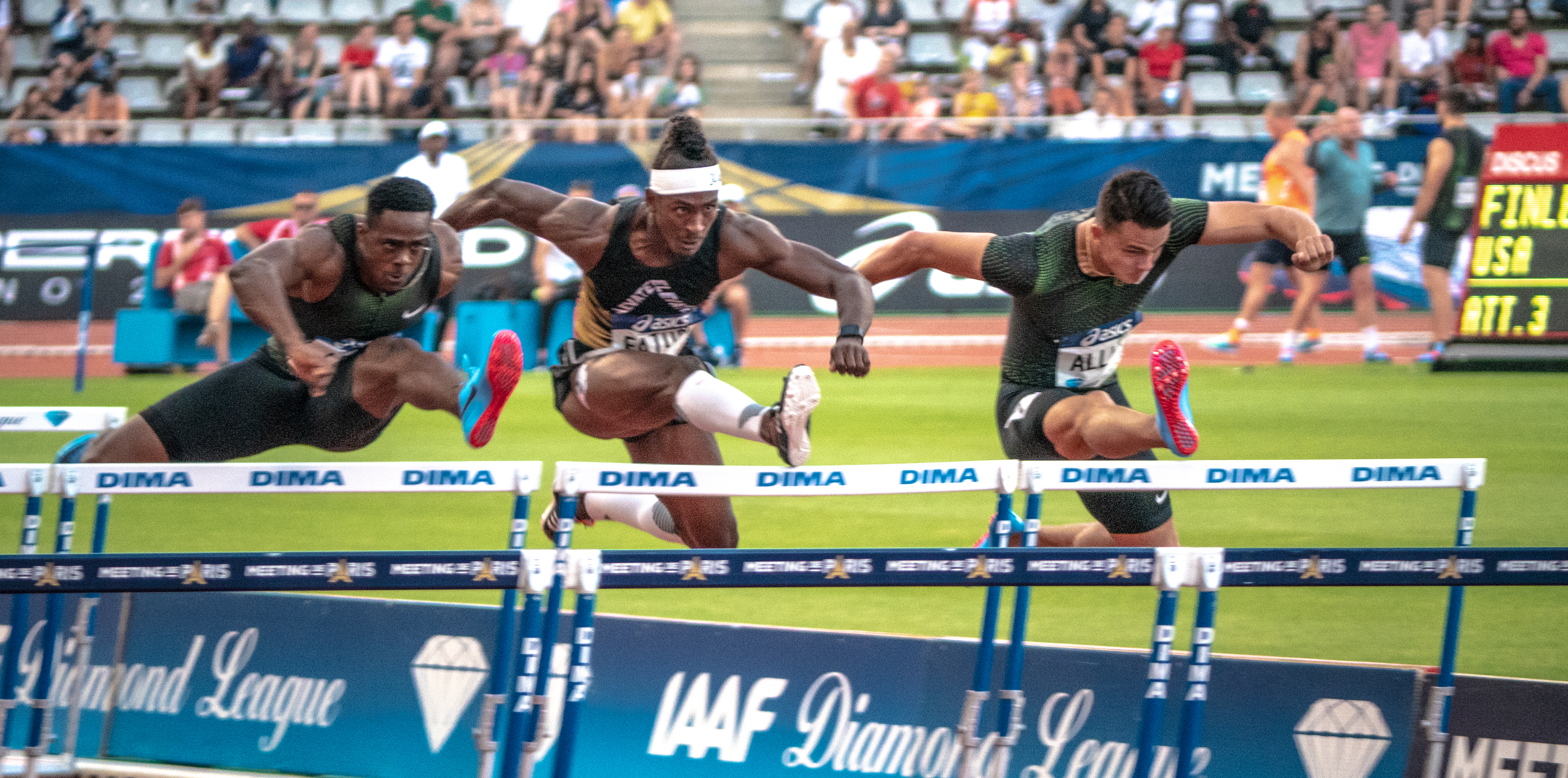
- Level: 2018 IAAF Diamond League
- Events: 13

The 2018 Meeting de Paris was the 24th edition of the annual outdoor track and field meeting in Paris, France. Held on 30 June 2018 at the Stade Sébastien Charléty, it was the seventh leg of the 2018 IAAF Diamond League – the highest level international track and field circuit.

Seven world-leading performances were set, including Qatari Abderrahman Samba's Asian record time of 46.98 seconds in the men's 400 metres hurdles and Caster Semenya's 1:54.25 minutes for the women's 800 metres. Both these were meeting records, as were Mariya Lasitskene's 2.04 m in the women's high jump and Sandra Perković's 68.60 m in the women's discus throw. Bahrain's Salwa Eid Naser also set an Asian record to win the women's 400 metres, with 49.55.

== Results ==
=== Men ===
100 m (+0.8 m/s)
Place	Athlete	Time	Points
1st place, gold medalist(s)	Ronnie Baker (USA)	9.88 =WL PB	8
2nd place, silver medalist(s)	Jimmy Vicaut (FRA)	9.91	7
3rd place, bronze medalist(s)	Su Bingtian (CHN)	9.91 =AR PB	6
4	Akani Simbine (RSA)	9.94	5
5	Yohan Blake (JAM)	10.03	4
6	Mike Rodgers (USA)	10.10	3
7	Arthur Cissé (CIV)	10.15	2
8	Jeff Demps (USA)	10.23	1

1500 m
Place	Athlete	Time	Points
1st place, gold medalist(s)	Timothy Cheruiyot (KEN)	3:29.71 WL	8
2nd place, silver medalist(s)	Ayanleh Souleiman (DJI)	3:31.77	7
3rd place, bronze medalist(s)	Charles Cheboi Simotwo (KEN)	3:32.61	6
4	Aman Wote (ETH)	3:32.81	5
5	Jakub Holuša (CZE)	3:32.85 NR PB	4
6	Filip Ingebrigtsen (NOR)	3:32.87	3
7	Bethwell Birgen (KEN)	3:34.27	2
8	Ismael Debjani (BEL)	3:35.71	1
9	Nick Willis (NZL)	3:36.26	
10	Taresa Tolosa (ETH)	3:36.81	
11	Simon Denissel (FRA)	3:36.88	
12	Baptiste Mischler (FRA)	3:37.17	
13	Alexandre Saddedine (FRA)	3:37.36	
14	Samir Dahmani (FRA)	3:39.05	
15	Quentin Tison (FRA)	3:40.31	
	Mounir Akbache (FRA)	DNF	
	Vincent Kibet (KEN)	DNF	
	Sadik Mikhou (BHR)	DQ (Note: Disqualified after competition due to antidoping rule violation)	

110 m hurdles (+1.5 m/s)
Place	Athlete	Time	Points
1st place, gold medalist(s)	Ronald Levy (JAM)	13.18	8
2nd place, silver medalist(s)	Hansle Parchment (JAM)	13.22	7
3rd place, bronze medalist(s)	Devon Allen (USA)	13.23	6
4	Antonio Alkana (RSA)	13.32	5
5	Jarret Eaton (USA)	13.40	4
6	Orlando Ortega (ESP)	13.44	3
7	Aurel Manga (FRA)	13.48	2
	Sergey Shubenkov (ANA)	DQ (R 162.8)	–

400 m hurdles
Place	Athlete	Time	Points
1st place, gold medalist(s)	Abderrahman Samba (QAT)	46.98 AR WL DLR MR	8
2nd place, silver medalist(s)	Kyron McMaster (IVB)	47.54 NR PB	7
3rd place, bronze medalist(s)	Karsten Warholm (NOR)	48.06	6
4	TJ Holmes (USA)	48.30 PB	5
5	Kerron Clement (USA)	48.83	4
6	Bershawn Jackson (USA)	49.16	3
7	Victor Coroller (FRA)	50.03	2
8	Juander Santos (DOM)	50.71	1

Pole vault
Place	Athlete	Mark	Points
1st place, gold medalist(s)	Sam Kendricks (USA)	5.96 m WL	8
2nd place, silver medalist(s)	Armand Duplantis (SWE)	5.90 m	7
3rd place, bronze medalist(s)	Renaud Lavillenie (FRA)	5.84 m	6
4	Piotr Lisek (POL)	5.84 m	5
5	Shawnacy Barber (CAN)	5.84 m	4
6	Kurtis Marschall (AUS)	5.70 m	3
7	Paweł Wojciechowski (POL)	5.70 m	2
8	Axel Chapelle (FRA)	5.60 m	1
9	Seito Yamamoto (JPN)	5.60 m	
10	Konstantinos Filippidis (GRE)	5.45 m	
11	Thiago Braz (BRA)	5.45 m	
	Raphael Holzdeppe (GER)	NM	

Discus throw
Place	Athlete	Mark	Points
1st place, gold medalist(s)	Fedrick Dacres (JAM)	67.01 m	8
2nd place, silver medalist(s)	Christoph Harting (GER)	64.80 m	7
3rd place, bronze medalist(s)	Robert Urbanek (POL)	64.68 m	6
4	Piotr Małachowski (POL)	64.47 m	5
5	Lukas Weisshaidinger (AUT)	64.44 m	4
6	Ehsan Haddadi (IRI)	64.36 m	3
7	Philip Milanov (BEL)	64.00 m	2
8	Daniel Jasinski (GER)	62.40 m	1
9	Mason Finley (USA)	61.91 m	
10	Andrius Gudžius (LTU)	61.31 m	
11	Lolassonn Djouhan (FRA)	60.88 m	
12	Daniel Ståhl (SWE)	60.46 m	

=== Women ===
200 m (+1.1 m/s)
Place	Athlete	Time	Points
1st place, gold medalist(s)	Shericka Jackson (JAM)	22.05 PB	8
2nd place, silver medalist(s)	Jenna Prandini (USA)	22.30	7
3rd place, bronze medalist(s)	Marie-Josée Ta Lou (CIV)	22.50	6
4	Jamile Samuel (NED)	22.63 PB	5
5	Kyra Jefferson (USA)	22.69	4
6	Kimberlyn Duncan (USA)	22.95	3
7	Tatjana Pinto (GER)	23.35	2
8	Brigitte Ntiamoah (FRA)	23.48	1

400 m
Place	Athlete	Time	Points
1st place, gold medalist(s)	Salwa Eid Naser (BHR)	49.55 AR PB	8
2nd place, silver medalist(s)	Jessica Beard (USA)	50.39	7
3rd place, bronze medalist(s)	Phyllis Francis (USA)	50.50	6
4	Shakima Wimbley (USA)	50.81	5
5	Stephenie Ann McPherson (JAM)	50.85	4
6	Courtney Okolo (USA)	51.15	3
7	Floria Gueï (FRA)	51.71	2
8	Anastasia Le-Roy (JAM)	52.44	1

800 m
Place	Athlete	Time	Points
1st place, gold medalist(s)	Caster Semenya (RSA)	1:54.25 WL NR DLR MR	8
2nd place, silver medalist(s)	Francine Niyonsaba (BDI)	1:55.86	7
3rd place, bronze medalist(s)	Ajeé Wilson (USA)	1:57.11	6
4	Habitam Alemu (ETH)	1:57.17	5
5	Natoya Goule (JAM)	1:57.69 NR PB	4
6	Charlene Lipsey (USA)	1:58.05	3
7	Emily Cherotich Tuei (KEN)	1:58.99	2
8	Rénelle Lamote (FRA)	1:59.25	1
9	Eunice Sum (KEN)	1:59.25	
10	Sifan Hassan (NED)	1:59.35	
11	Claudia Saunders (FRA)	2:00.47	
	Margaret Wambui (KEN)	DNF	

3000 m steeplechase
Place	Athlete	Time	Points
1st place, gold medalist(s)	Beatrice Chepkoech (KEN)	8:59.36 WL PB	8
2nd place, silver medalist(s)	Celliphine Chespol (KEN)	9:01.82	7
3rd place, bronze medalist(s)	Hyvin Jepkemoi (KEN)	9:03.86	6
4	Norah Jeruto (KEN)	9:04.17	5
5	Winfred Yavi (BHR)	9:12.74 PB	4
6	Rosefline Chepngetich (KEN)	9:17.08 PB	3
7	Daisy Jepkemei (KEN)	9:7.35	2
8	Aisha Praught-Leer (JAM)	9:20.89	1
9	Karoline Bjerkeli Grøvdal (NOR)	9:28.50	
10	Fabienne Schlumpf (SUI)	9:39.89	
11	Elena Burkard (GER)	9:40.18	
12	Geneviève Lalonde (CAN)	9:40.34	
	Ann Gathoni (KEN)	DNF	
	Caroline Chepkurui (KEN)	DNF	

High jump
Place	Athlete	Mark	Points
1st place, gold medalist(s)	Mariya Lasitskene (ANA)	2.04 m WL MR	8
2nd place, silver medalist(s)	Nafissatou Thiam (BEL)	1.97 m	7
3rd place, bronze medalist(s)	Yuliya Levchenko (UKR)	1.97 m	6
4	Mirela Demireva (BUL)	1.94 m	5
5	Elena Vallortigara (ITA)	1.94 m	4
6	Kateryna Tabashnyk (UKR)	1.94 m	3
7	Marie-Laurence Jungfleisch (GER)	1.94 m	2
8	Erika Kinsey (SWE)	1.90 m	1
9	Levern Spencer (LCA)	1.90 m	
10	Alessia Trost (ITA)	1.85 m	
10	Claire Orcel (BEL)	1.85 m	

Triple jump
Place	Athlete	Mark	Points
1st place, gold medalist(s)	Caterine Ibargüen (COL)	14.83 m (+0.1 m/s)	8
2nd place, silver medalist(s)	Kimberly Williams (JAM)	14.56 m (+0.7 m/s)	7
3rd place, bronze medalist(s)	Tori Franklin (USA)	14.49 m (+0.6 m/s)	6
4	Kristin Gierisch (GER)	14.42 m (+1.1 m/s) PB	5
5	Shanieka Ricketts (JAM)	14.38 m (+1.5 m/s)	4
6	Ana Peleteiro (ESP)	14.31 m (+0.6 m/s)	3
7	Rouguy Diallo (FRA)	14.27 m (+0.8 m/s) PB	2
8	Olga Rypakova (KAZ)	14.25 m (−0.4 m/s)	1
9	Jeanine Assani Issouf (FRA)	14.16 m (+1.9 m/s)	
10	Hanna Knyazyeva-Minenko (ISR)	14.04 m (−0.2 m/s)	
11	Núbia Soares (BRA)	13.94 m (+1.7 m/s)	

Discus throw
Place	Athlete	Mark	Points
1st place, gold medalist(s)	Sandra Perković (CRO)	68.60 m MR	8
2nd place, silver medalist(s)	Yaime Pérez (CUB)	66.55 m	7
3rd place, bronze medalist(s)	Denia Caballero (CUB)	63.13 m	6
4	Andressa de Morais (BRA)	62.93 m	5
5	Anna Rüh (GER)	62.65 m	4
6	Claudine Vita (GER)	62.31 m	3
7	Nadine Müller (GER)	60.28 m	2
8	Whitney Ashley (USA)	57.33 m	1

=== Promotional events ===
Men's 100 metres (+1.2 m/s)
Place	Athlete	Country	Time
1st place, gold medalist(s)	Abdullah Abkar Mohammed	Saudi Arabia	10.03 NR
2nd place, silver medalist(s)	Hassan Taftian	Iran	10.03 NR
3rd place, bronze medalist(s)	Henricho Bruintjies	South Africa	10.15
4	Mouhamadou Fall	France	10.17
5	Churandy Martina	Netherlands	10.20
6	Thando Roto	South Africa	10.23
7	Paulo André de Oliveira	Brazil	10.30
8	Christophe Lemaitre	France	10.97

Men's 200 metres (−0.6 m/s)
Place	Athlete	Country	Time
1st place, gold medalist(s)	Michael Norman	United States	19.84
2nd place, silver medalist(s)	Rai Benjamin	United States	19.99
3rd place, bronze medalist(s)	Álex Quiñónez	Ecuador	20.08
4	Luxolo Adams	South Africa	20.21
5	Bruno Hortelano	Spain	20.30
6	Churandy Martina	Netherlands	20.68
	Alonso Edward	Panama	DQ R 162.8

Men's 800 metres
Place	Athlete	Country	Time
1st place, gold medalist(s)	Ferguson Rotich	Kenya	1:43.73
2nd place, silver medalist(s)	Jonathan Kitilit	Kenya	1:43.83
3rd place, bronze medalist(s)	Saúl Ordóñez	Spain	1:44.36
4	Isaiah Harris	United States	1:44.42
5	Alfred Kipketer	Kenya	1:44.62
6	Joseph Deng	Australia	1:44.67
7	Pierre-Ambroise Bosse	France	1:45.19
8	Erik Sowinski	United States	1:45.34
9	Thiago André	Brazil	1:45.59
10	Peter Bol	Australia	1:45.82
11	Marc Reuther	Germany	1:46.06
	Jackson Kivuva	Kenya	DNF
