= 2018 IAAF World Indoor Championships – Men's 1500 metres =

Men's 1500 metres at the 2018 IAAF World Indoor Championships
- Venue: Arena Birmingham
- Dates: 3–4 March
- Competitors: 24 from 20 nations
- Winning time: 3:58.19

Medalists
gold medal	Samuel Tefera	Ethiopia
silver medal	Marcin Lewandowski	Poland
bronze medal	Abdelaati Iguider	Morocco

Video on YouTube Official Video

The men's 1500 metres at the 2018 IAAF World Indoor Championships took place on 3 and 4 March 2018.

== Summary ==
Two disqualifications and three national records highlighted the heats.

In the final, 2012 champion, Abdelaati Iguider jumped out to an early lead, with the American pair of Ben Blankenship and Craig Engels immediately behind him. The entire field jogged through the first 400 at warm up pace, 1:15.84. Blankenship found himself in the lead, looking around as if, "where is everybody?" At 600 metres, in 1:52.48, finally 18 year old Samuel Tefera came forward, the pace quickened slightly. He was joined by teammate Aman Wote and the pace began to get quicker, though still not 30 per lap pace. 800 metres in 2:23.68. Iguider came back to Tefera's shoulder, both speeding up to run a 28.49 lap, 1000 metres in 2:52.16. Blankenship held on to their back, Wote boxing him in on the outside. A 27.38 lap for 1200 in 3:19.54. Jake Wightman ran out in lane 3 to run around the crowd into third place as Iguider squeezed into the lead on the inside. With 300 metres to go, Marcin Lewandowski, known more as an 800 metres runner, was at the back of the pack, but he too moved to the outside and started sprinting past the field, reaching Wightman at the bell. Wightman held Lewandowski to the outside of the penultimate turn but on the backstretch, he passed and set off after Tefera and Iguider. A 25.38 lap, 3:44.84 would have won the race most years, but they still had 100 metres to go. It came down to a final 50 metre sprint on the home stretch. Tefera passed Iguider and ran away to victory, with Lewandowski in full sprint behind him. A desperate Iguider began leaning five metres before the finish, but he couldn't hold off Lewandowski speeding past for silver. For Iguider, it was his second bronze medal in this event, to go along with the complete set of medals he had already collected between 2010 and 2014.

The winning time of 3:58.19 would be a slow mile time in this era. Tefera had run significantly faster, setting the World Junior Record in the event at 3:36.05, just 36 days earlier. That was his first experience on an indoor track.

== Results ==
=== Heats ===
The heats were started on 3 March at 11:10.

Rank	Heat	Name	Nationality	Time	Notes
1	1	Abdelaati Iguider	Morocco	3:40.13	Q
2	1	Aman Wote	Ethiopia	3:40.20	Q
3	1	Ben Blankenship	United States	3:40.23	q
4	1	Marcin Lewandowski	Poland	3:40.78	q
5	1	Chris O'Hare	Great Britain	3:42.46	q
6	2	Samuel Tefera	Ethiopia	3:44.00	Q
7	2	Vincent Kibet	Kenya	3:44.26	Q
8	2	Ryan Gregson	Australia	3:44.44	
9	2	Marc Alcalá	Spain	3:45.49	
10	2	Jakub Holuša	Czech Republic	3:45.84	
11	2	Kalle Berglund	Sweden	3:46.61	
12	3	Jake Wightman	Great Britain	3:47.23	Q
13	3	Craig Engels	United States	3:47.55	Q
14	3	Brahim Kaazouzi	Morocco	3:47.65	
15	2	Musa Hajdari	Kosovo	3:47.68	NR
16	2	Harvey Dixon	Gibraltar	3:49.89	NR
17	1	Dario Ivanovski	Macedonia	3:51.83	PB
18	1	Dey Tuach Dey	South Sudan	3:56.10	NR
19	3	Mikhail Soloshenko	Kyrgyzstan	4:05.52	
	1	Mohamed Ismail Mohamed	Somalia	DNF	
	3	Benjamín Enzema	Equatorial Guinea	DQ	
	3	Oddom Sat	Cambodia	DQ	
	3	Ayanleh Souleiman	Djibouti	DNS	
	3	Sadik Mikhou	Bahrain	DNS	

=== Final ===
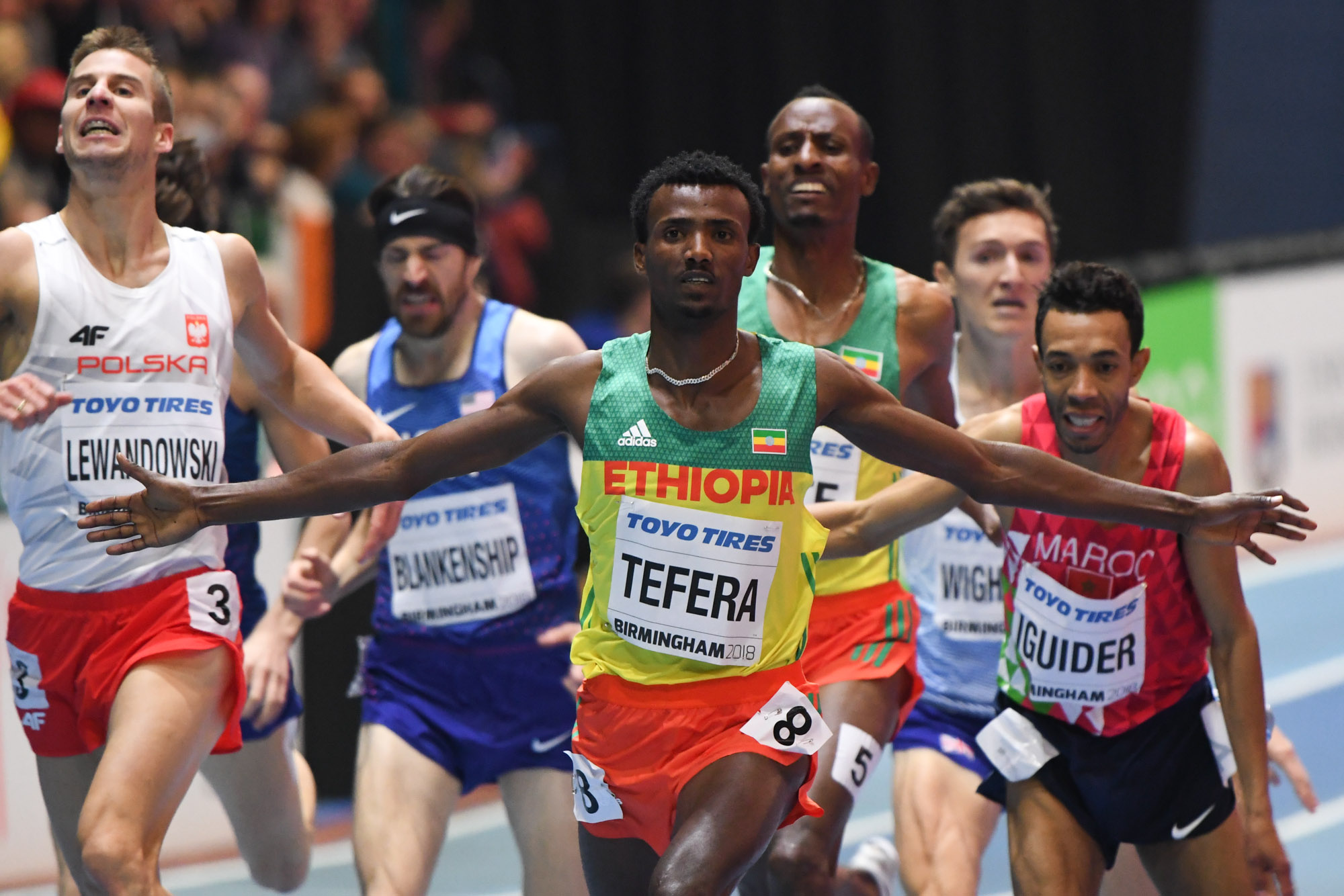
The finish of the race

The final was started on March 4 at 16:12.

Rank	Name	Nationality	Time	Notes
1st place, gold medalist(s)	Samuel Tefera	Ethiopia	3:58.19	
2nd place, silver medalist(s)	Marcin Lewandowski	Poland	3:58.39	
3rd place, bronze medalist(s)	Abdelaati Iguider	Morocco	3:58.43	
4	Aman Wote	Ethiopia	3:58.64	
5	Ben Blankenship	United States	3:58.89	
6	Jake Wightman	Great Britain	3:58.91	
7	Craig Engels	United States	3:58.92	
8	Chris O'Hare	Great Britain	4:00.65	
9	Vincent Kibet	Kenya	4:02.32	
