= 2016 IAAF World Indoor Championships – Men's 1500 metres =

Men's 1500 metres at the 2016 IAAF World Indoor Championships
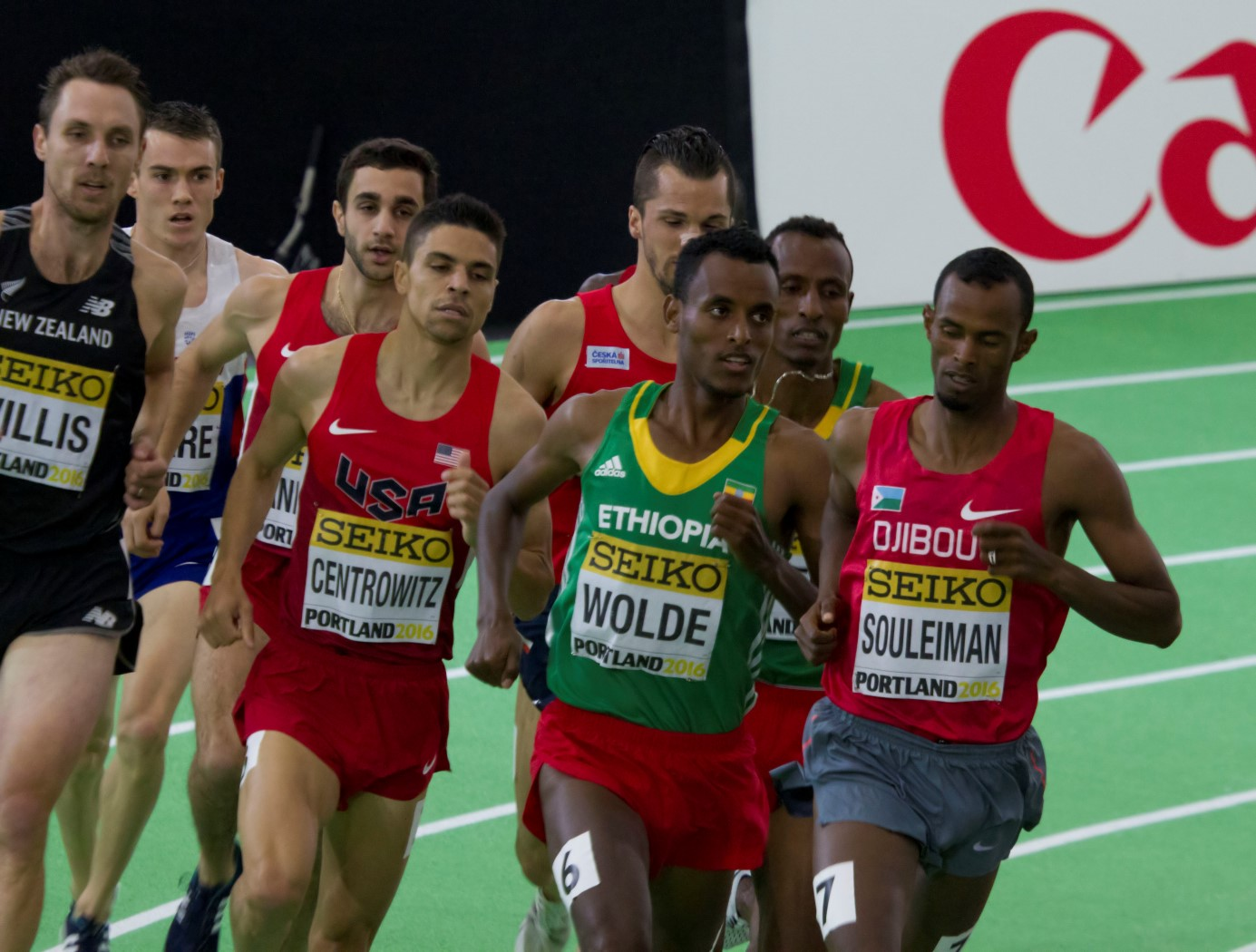
- Venue: Oregon Convention Center
- Dates: March 18 (heats); March 20 (final)
- Competitors: 15 from 10 nations
- Winning time: 3:44.22

Medalists
gold medal	Matt Centrowitz	United States
silver medal	Jakub Holuša	Czech Republic
bronze medal	Nicholas Willis	New Zealand

Video on YouTube Official Video

The men's 1500 metres at the 2016 IAAF World Indoor Championships took place on March 18 and 20, 2016.

In the finals, defending champion Ayanleh Souleiman didn't take the lead from the gun, but ran around the field on the first lap to assume first place by the end of the first lap. Dawit Wolde, Aman Wote followed and Matt Centrowitz affixed himself to the outside in third place. At 800 metres (jogged in 2:07.88), Chris O'Hare made a run at the lead, but everybody just sped up and maintained their formation. With 400 metres to go, Nicholas Willis made a stronger move to the front which succeeded, Souleiman disappeared out the back with the other leaders in hot pursuit. With a lap to go, Centrowitz got past Wolde for some free running room at Willis three metres ahead. Centrowitz eased his way closer to Willis through the next three quarters of a lap, making a strong move off the final turn sprinting ahead to a one-metre victory. From seventh place, more than 10 metres behind, Jakub Holuša pulled out to lane 2 and sprinted around the field. Coming down the final straightaway he looked like he was in a 400-metre race, dipping at the line just ahead of Willis and barely a half a metre behind Centrowitz. From even further back, Robby Andrews followed Holuša and pipped both Ethiopian runners for fourth place at the line.

== Results ==
=== Heats ===
Qualification: First 3 (Q) and next 3 fastest (q) qualified for the semifinals.

Rank	Heat	Name	Nationality	Time	Notes
1	2	Ayanleh Souleiman	Djibouti	3:41.04	Q
2	2	Chris O'Hare	Great Britain	3:41.09	Q
3	2	Robby Andrews	United States	3:41.21	Q
4	2	Aman Wote	Ethiopia	3:41.25	q
5	2	Vincent Kibet	Kenya	3:41.42	q
6	2	Nicholas Willis	New Zealand	3:41.53	q
7	2	Marc Alcalá	Spain	3:42.02	
8	1	Matt Centrowitz	United States	3:47.15	Q
9	1	Dawit Wolde	Ethiopia	3:47.24	Q
10	1	Jakub Holuša	Czech Republic	3:47.62	Q
DQ	1	Iván López	Chile	~~3:48.63~~	Doping
11	1	Charlie Grice	Great Britain	3:49.03	
12	1	Bethwell Birgen	Kenya	3:49.35	
13	2	Erick Rodriguez	Nicaragua	3:58.37	NR
	1	Manuel Olmedo	Spain	DNF	

=== Final ===
The race was started on March 20 at 14:05.

Rank	Name	Nationality	Time	Notes
1st place, gold medalist(s)	Matt Centrowitz	United States	3:44.22	
2nd place, silver medalist(s)	Jakub Holuša	Czech Republic	3:44.30	
3rd place, bronze medalist(s)	Nicholas Willis	New Zealand	3:44.37	
4	Robby Andrews	United States	3:44.77	
5	Dawit Wolde	Ethiopia	3:44.81	
6	Aman Wote	Ethiopia	3:44.86	
7	Vincent Kibet	Kenya	3:45.17	
8	Chris O'Hare	Great Britain	3:46.50	
9	Ayanleh Souleiman	Djibouti	3:53.69	
