= 2012 IAAF World Indoor Championships – Men's 1500 metres =

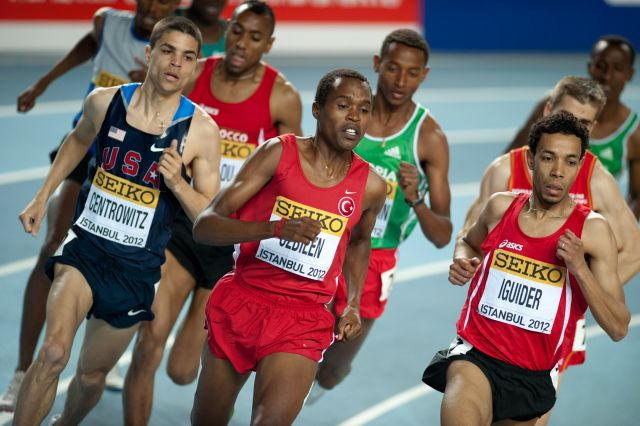
Abdalaati Iguider (far right) en route to his victory.

The men's 1500 metres at the 2012 IAAF World Indoor Championships took place 9 and 10 March at the Ataköy Athletics Arena.

== Medalists ==
Gold	Silver	Bronze
Abdalaati Iguider; Morocco	Ilham Tanui Özbilen; Turkey	Mekonnen Gebremedhin; Ethiopia

== Records ==
Standing records prior to the 2012 IAAF World Indoor Championships
World record	Hicham El Guerrouj (MAR)	3:31.18	Stuttgart, Germany	2 February 1997
Championship record	Haile Gebrselassie (ETH)	3:33.77	Maebashi, Japan	7 March 1999
World Leading	Abdalaati Iguider (MAR)	3:34.10	Liévin, France	14 February 2012
African record	Hicham El Guerrouj (MAR)	3:31.18	Stuttgart, Germany	2 February 1997
Asian record	Belal Mansoor Ali (BHR)	3:36.28	Stockholm, Sweden	20 February 2007
European record	Andrés Manuel Díaz (ESP)	3:33.32	Piraeus, Greece	24 February 1999
North and Central American and Caribbean record	Bernard Lagat (USA)	3:35.23	Birmingham, Great Britain	16 February 2008
Oceanian Record	Nick Willis (NZL)	3:35.80	Birmingham, Great Britain	20 February 2010
South American record	Agberto Guimarães (BRA)	3:42.70	Piraeus, Greece	8 March 1989

== Qualification standards ==
Indoor	Outdoor
3:42.00 or 3:59.00 (Mile)	3:34.25 or 3:52.00 (Mile)

== Schedule ==
Date	Time	Round
March 9, 2012	12:55	Heats
March 10, 2012	19:00	Final

== Results ==
=== Heats ===
Qualification: First 3 of each heat (Q) plus 3 fastest times qualified (q). The qualification round started at 12:59 and ended at 13:10.

Rank	Heat	Name	Nationality	Time	Notes
1	2	Abdalaati Iguider	Morocco	3:38.41	Q
2	2	Mekonnen Gebremedhin	Ethiopia	3:39.16	Q
3	2	Ayanleh Souleiman	Djibouti	3:39.51	Q, NR
4	2	Matthew Centrowitz, Jr.	United States	3:39.54	q
5	2	Silas Kiplagat	Kenya	3:39.59	q
6	2	Francisco Javier Abad	Spain	3:40.55	q
7	1	Ilham Tanui Özbilen	Turkey	3:41.93	Q
8	1	Aman Wote	Ethiopia	3:42.24	Q
9	1	Amine Laâlou	Morocco	3:42.36	Q
10	1	Bethwell Birgen	Kenya	3:42.72	
11	2	Yegor Nikolayev	Russia	3:43.33	
12	1	Galen Rupp	United States	3:43.39	PB
13	1	David Bustos	Spain	3:43.66	
14	1	Gregory Beugnet	France	3:44.20	
15	1	Oleksandr Borysiuk	Ukraine	3:44.28	
16	1	Lewis Moses	Great Britain	3:45.04	
DQ	2	Mohammed Shaween	Saudi Arabia	~~3:45.12~~	~~NR~~, Doping
17	2	Kemal Koyuncu	Turkey	3:45.33	SB
18	2	Ryan Foster	Australia	3:46.26	PB
19	2	James Brewer	Great Britain	3:47.58	
20	1	Mohamad Al-Garni	Qatar	3:47.63	
21	1	Ciaran O'Lionaird	Ireland	3:50.12	PB
22	1	Abdallahi Cheikh	Mauritania	4:47.24	NR

=== Final ===
9 athletes from 7 countries participated. The final started at 19:01 and ended at 19:05.

Rank	Name	Nationality	Time	Notes
1st place, gold medalist(s)	Abdalaati Iguider	Morocco	3:45.21	
2nd place, silver medalist(s)	Ilham Tanui Özbilen	Turkey	3:45.35	
3rd place, bronze medalist(s)	Mekonnen Gebremedhin	Ethiopia	3:45.90	
4	Aman Wote	Ethiopia	3:47.02	
5	Ayanleh Souleiman	Djibouti	3:47.35	
6	Silas Kiplagat	Kenya	3:47.42	
7	Matthew Centrowitz, Jr.	United States	3:47.42	
8	Francisco Javier Abad	Spain	3:48.14	
9	Amine Laâlou	Morocco	3:49.14	
