= Matthew Centrowitz Jr. =

American middle-distance runner

Matthew Centrowitz
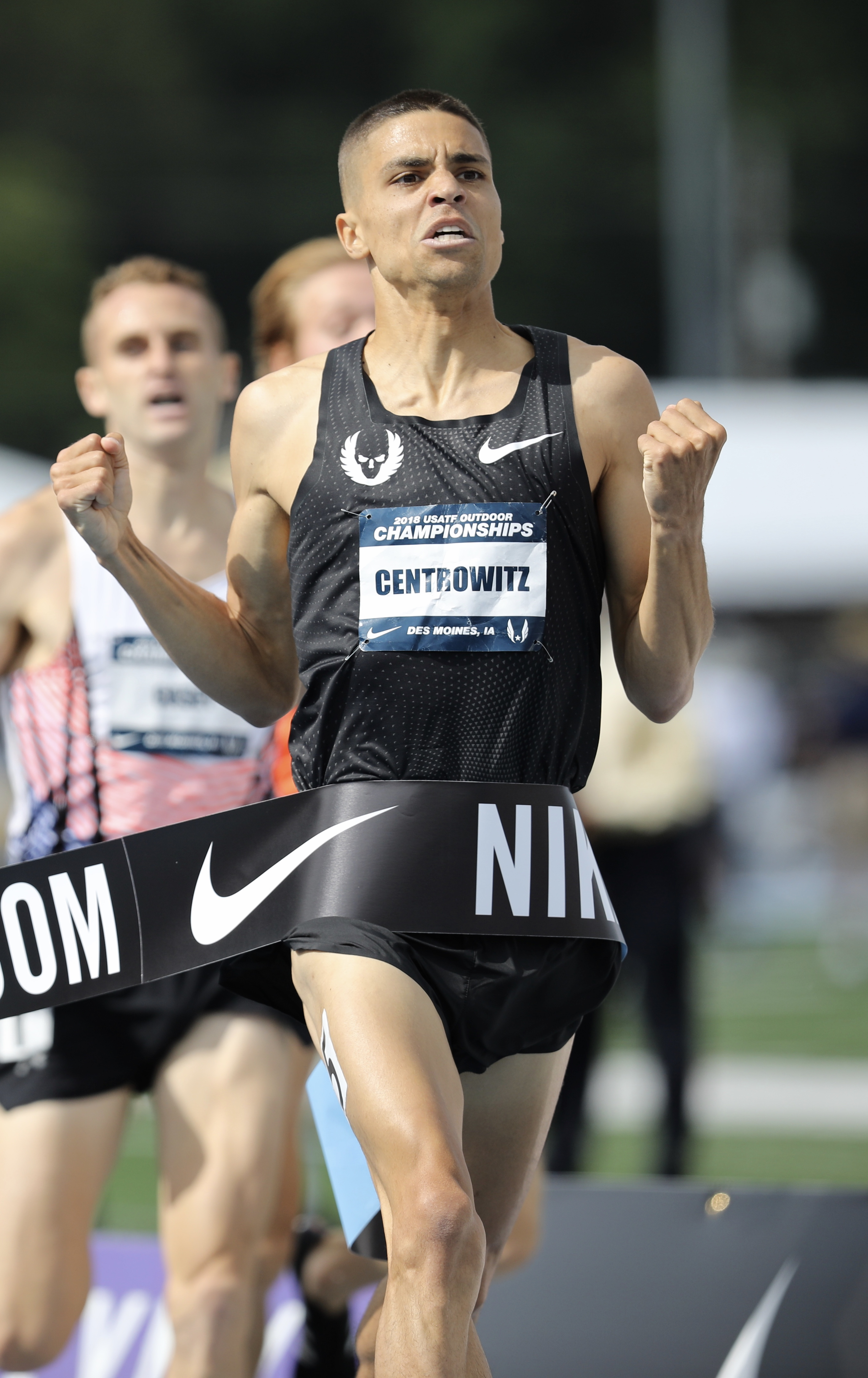
- Centrowitz wins the 1500 m at the 2018 USA Outdoor Track and Field Championships

Personal information
- Nationality: American
- Born: October 18, 1989 (age 36) Beltsville, Maryland, U.S.
- Height: 5 ft 9 in (175 cm)
- Weight: 133 lb (60 kg)

Sport
- Country: United States
- Sport: Track and Field
- Event: 1500 meters
- College team: Oregon Ducks
- Turned pro: Nov. 2011
- Retired: 2024

Achievements and titles
- Olympic finals: 2012 London; 1500 m, 4th; 2016 Rio de Janeiro; 1500 m, Gold; 2020 Tokyo; 1500 m, 15th (sf)
- World finals: 2011 Daegu; 1500 m, Bronze; 2013 Moscow; 1500 m, Silver; 2015 Beijing; 1500 m, 8th; 2017 London; 1500 m, 37th (h); 2019 Doha; 1500 m, 8th
- Personal bests: Outdoor; 800 m: 1:44.62 (New York 2015); 1500 m: 3:30.40 (Monaco 2015); Mile: 3:49.26 (Portland 2021); 5000 m: 13:00.39 (Beaverton 2019); Indoor; 1000 m: 2:17.00i (Boston 2015); Mile: 3:50.63i (New York 2016); 3000 m: 7:40.74i (Portland 2016)
Medal record
Men's athletics
Representing the United States
Olympic Games
Gold medal – first place	2016 Rio de Janeiro	1500 m
World Championships
Silver medal – second place	2013 Moscow	1500 m
Bronze medal – third place	2011 Daegu	1500 m
World Indoor Championships
Gold medal – first place	2016 Portland	1500 m
Pan American Junior Championships
Gold medal – first place	2007 São Paulo	1500 m

Matthew Centrowitz Jr. (born October 18, 1989) is an American middle-distance runner, who specializes in the 1500 metres. He won a gold medal in the event at the 2016 Summer Olympics in Rio de Janeiro, a bronze medal at the 2011 World Championships, and a silver medal at the 2013 World Championships. Centrowitz is also a five-time national champion in the 1500 m at the USA Outdoor Track and Field Championships.

As a high schooler, Centrowitz won a gold medal at the 2007 Pan American Junior Championships. He competed in college for the University of Oregon, where he was the NCAA champion in the 1500 m in 2011. The university inducted him into the Oregon Sports Hall of Fame in 2021. Centrowitz competed professionally for Nike from 2011 until his retirement in 2024.

== Early life and youth sports ==
Centrowitz was born in Beltsville, Maryland, the son of Beverly (née Bannister) and two-time Olympian Matt Centrowitz, who was the head track coach at American University in Washington, D.C. Centrowitz Jr.'s father is of Jewish and Irish ancestry, and his mother is from Guyana. His sister Lauren Centrowitz is also an elite runner, qualifying for the Olympic Trials in 2012. Centrowitz is Catholic. He grew up in Arnold, Maryland.

Centrowitz was a track star at Broadneck High School in Annapolis. His negative split 8:41.55 win in the 2-mile race at the Nike Outdoor Nationals was described as one of the best races in prep history and was also the best high school time of 2007. His time of 4:08.38 for the mile at the Penn Relays in April 2007 established a meet record. That same year, he also set the Maryland state record over 1600 meters in 4:04.09 and won a gold medal at the Pan American Junior Championships held in São Paulo, Brazil in the 1500 m run.

== Collegiate competition ==
Centrowitz ran for the University of Oregon from 2007 to 2011, where he was a 7-time All-American. In 2009, Centrowitz's split of 3.59.53 helped break the NCAA 4 x mile record on May 10 with teammates Andrew Wheating (3:59.60), Shadrack Kiptoo-Biwott (4:05.21), and Galen Rupp (3:58.93), shaving a little more than a second off of the old record with a 16:03.24.

In 2011 Centrowitz won the 1500 meters in the Pac-10 and the NCAA Men's Division I Outdoor Track and Field Championships. On November 29, 2011, Centrowitz announced his decision to turn professional.

== Senior competition ==
=== 2011- 2012: Bronze medal in Daegu ===
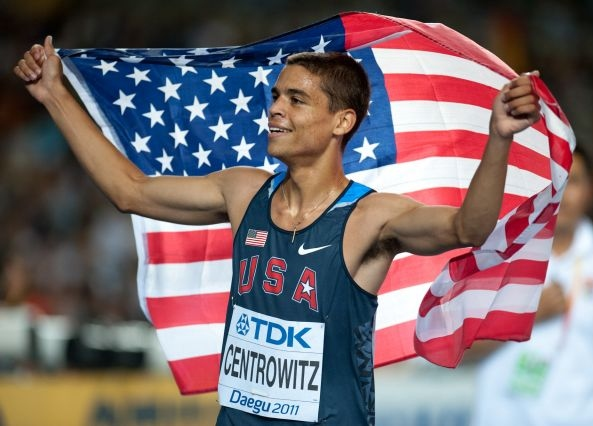
Centrowitz after winning bronze in the 1500 m at the 2011 World Championships in Daegu, South Korea.

Centrowitz joined the Nike Oregon Project in 2011, where he was coached by Alberto Salazar. Centrowitz outkicked Bernard Lagat and Leo Manzano at the 2011 USATF Outdoor Championships in the 1500m. He won a bronze medal in the 2011 IAAF World Championships in Athletics in the 1500m behind Asbel Kiprop and Silas Kiplagat.

In 2012, Centrowitz qualified for the IAAF World Indoor Championships in Istanbul, Turkey by getting second in the national indoor 1500m championship, behind Manzano and in front of teammate Galen Rupp. He finished seventh in the World Championship Indoor 1500m final, with a time of 3:47.42. On July 1, 2012, Centrowitz qualified for the United States Olympic team in the 1500 m. He finished in fourth place in the 2012 London Olympic Games in the 1,500 meter race, missing the bronze medal by .04 seconds with a time of 3:35.17. He won the Fifth Avenue Mile ahead of Bernard Lagat in September.

=== 2013 - 2015: Silver medal in Moscow ===
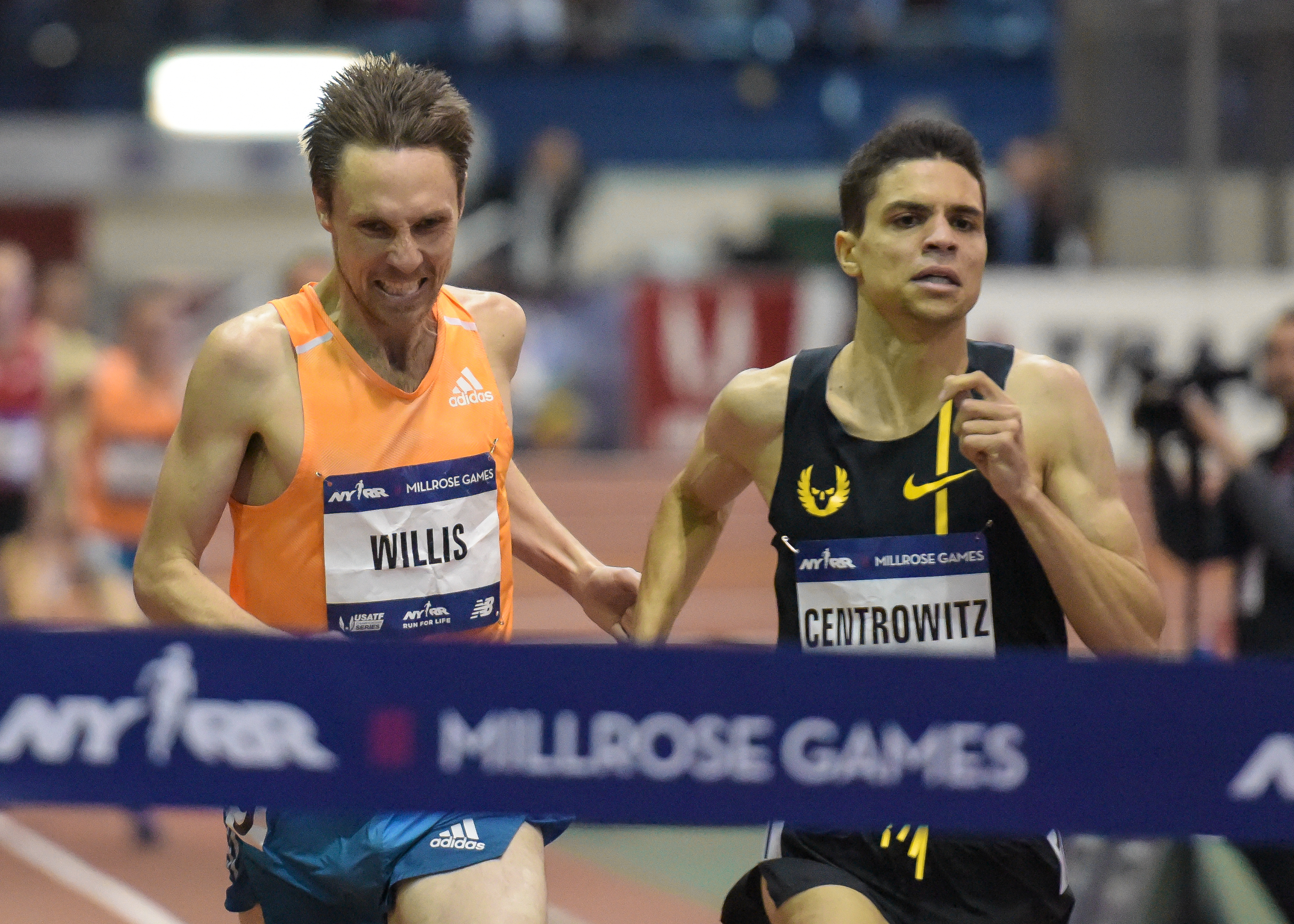
Centrowitz (right) and Nick Willis (left) in the final stretch of the Wanamaker Mile in 2015.

During the 2013 indoor season, his first race was at the Seattle UW Indoor Preview, where he won the 800m. He was second at the Millrose Games Wanamaker Mile. He was first at the New Balance Indoor Grand Prix mile. At the USATF Indoor Championships, he was fourth in the 800m and 8th in the mile. To kick off his outdoor season, he took part in the Penn Relays USA vs. The World, where his team took fourth in the DMR with a time of 9:19.33. He was sixth at the Oxy High Performance meet in the 1500m. He was tenth in the Prefontaine Classic Bowerman Mile, setting a personal best of 3:51.79. He won the USATF Outdoor 1500m championship for the second time, which qualified him for the IAAF World Championships in Moscow. He won the silver medal in Moscow with a time of 3:36.78.

Centrowitz spent the 2014 outdoor season lowering his PRs. At the Diamond League meet in Monaco, he achieved a nearly one second personal best in the 1500 meters best by clocking 3:31.09, which ranked seventh in United States history at the time.

=== 2016: Olympic Gold medal in Rio de Janeiro ===
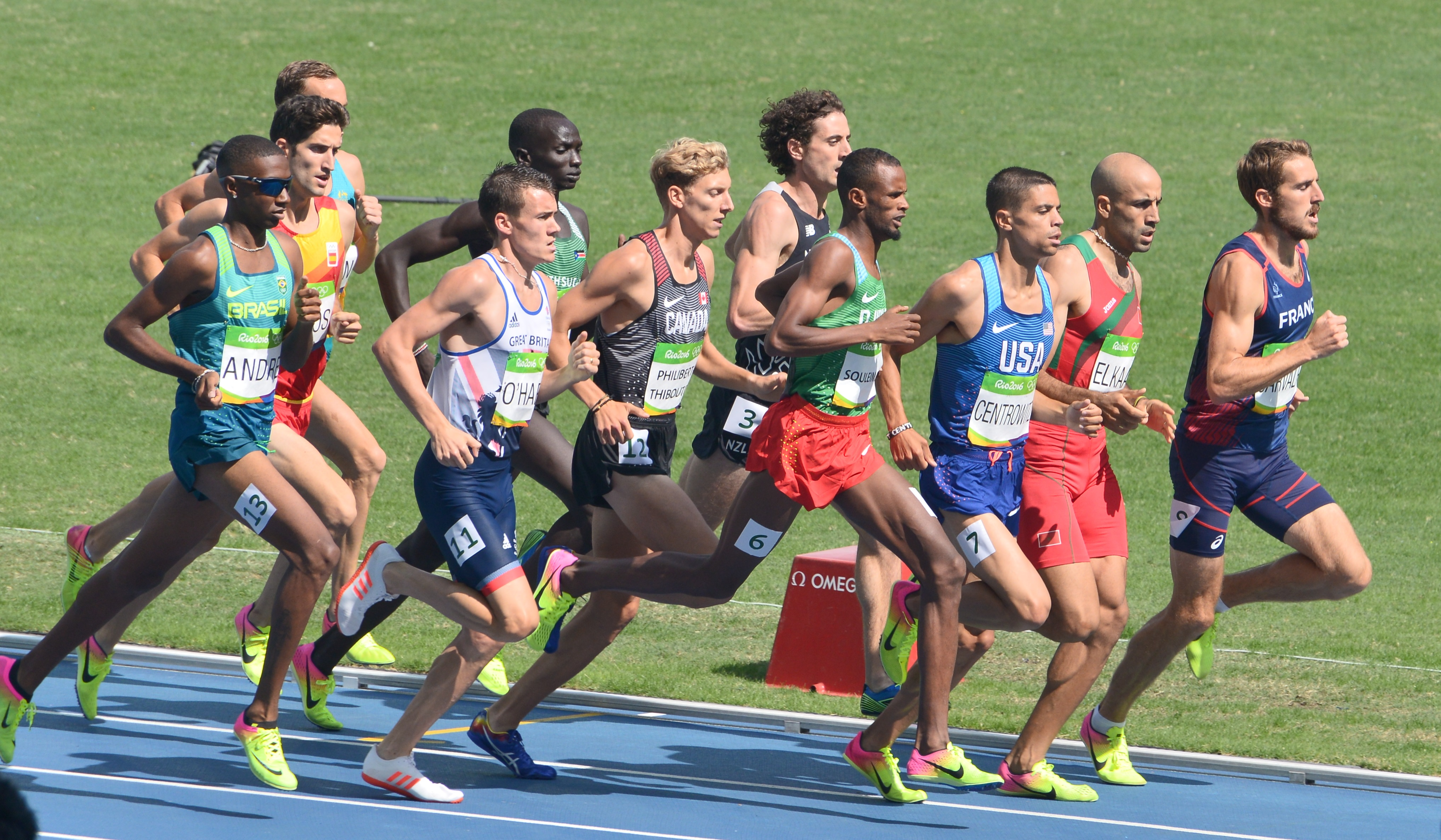
Centrowitz (third from right) in a semi-final of the 1500 m at the 2016 Olympics in Rio de Janeiro, Brazil.

On February 20, 2016, Centrowitz won the Millrose Games men's indoor mile in 3:50.63, edging off Nick Willis.

On March 20, 2016, Centrowitz won the 1500 meters at the World Indoor Championships, wrapping up an unbeaten indoor season.

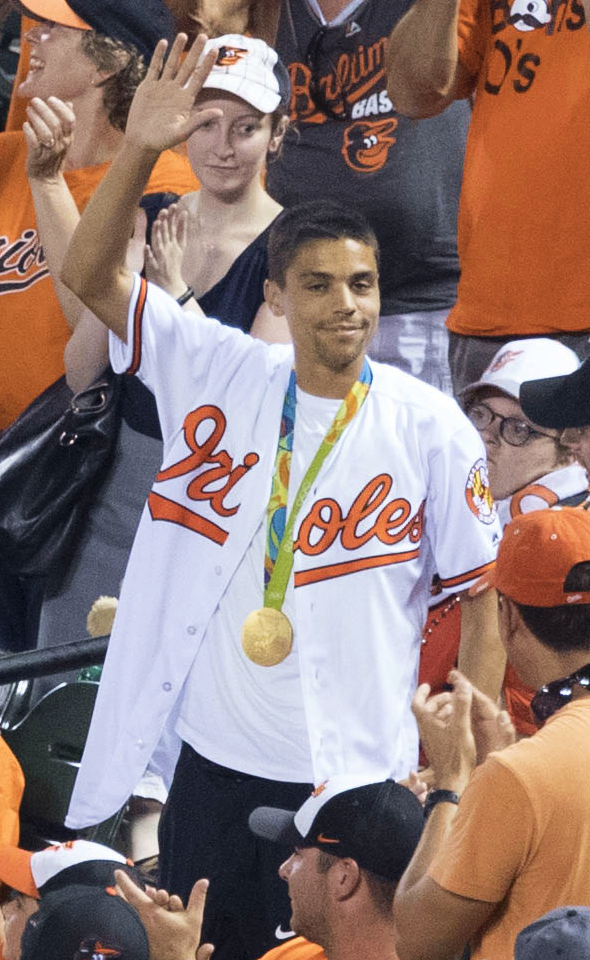
Centrowitz attended a Baltimore Orioles baseball game after winning a gold medal in the 2016 Summer Olympics.

On August 20, 2016, Centrowitz competed at the 2016 Olympic Games, where he won the 1500 meters race in 3:50.00, becoming the first American to win the event since Mel Sheppard in 1908. The race was tactical and the pace slow at the start; the first four finalists in the T13 1500m men's final at the 2016 Summer Paralympics all finished faster than Centrowitz.

=== 2017 - present ===
In January 2019, Centrowitz moved to the Bowerman Track Club under the coaching of Jerry Schumacher.

In 2021, Centrowitz qualified for his third Olympics in the 1,500 m. Prior to the Olympics, Centrowitz ran in a specially set up mile run as a tune-up. While his pacers dropped off the pace earlier than expected, he still finished in a new personal best of 3:49.26.

Centrowitz competed in the 1500 m at the delayed 2020 Summer Games in Tokyo. In the heats of the 1500, he coasted through the slowest heat with a time of 3:41.12. In the semifinals he placed 9th, failing to qualify for the finals and defend his 1500m Olympic title.

Centrowitz was inducted into the Oregon Sports Hall of Fame in 2021. In May 2022, Centrowitz had surgery to repair an ACL injury from the prior year. Prior to this injury-induced absence from the USA championships, he had made all eight outdoor World Athletics Championships and Olympic teams from 2011 to 2021. In late 2022, he formally confirmed that he had left the Bowerman Track Club and was now self-coached.

Centrowitz placed tenth in the final of the 1,500 m at the 2023 USA Outdoor Track and Field Championships.

Centrowitz announced in March 2024 that he would retire after the 2024 outdoor season. On June 21, 2024, the 34-year-old announced his withdrawal from the 2024 U.S. Olympic trials due to injury. He retired from professional competition in 2024.

== Personal life ==
Centrowitz married on October 3, 2023, to Lyndsay Centrowitz. Their first child, Luka, was born on November 10, 2024.

== Achievements ==
All information from World Athletics profile.

Year	Competition	Venue	Position	Notes	
Representing theUnited States
2007	Pan American Junior Championships	São Paulo, Brazil	1st	1500 m	3:56.63
2011	World Championships	Daegu, South Korea	3rd	1500 m	3:36.08
2012	World Indoor Championships	Istanbul, Turkey	7th	1500 m	3:47.42
2012	Olympic Games	London, United Kingdom	4th	1500 m	3:35.17
2013	World Championships	Moscow, Russia	2nd	1500 m	3:36.78
2015	World Championships	Beijing, China	8th	1500 m	3:36.13
2016	World Indoor Championships	Portland, United States	1st	1500 m	3:44.22
2016	Olympic Games	Rio de Janeiro, Brazil	1st	1500 m	3:50.00
2017	World Championships	London, United Kingdom	37th (h)	1500 m	3:48.34
2019	World Championships	Doha, Qatar	8th	1500 m	3:32.81
2021	Olympic Games	Tokyo, Japan	10th (sf)	1500 m	3:33.69
