= 2015 European Athletics Indoor Championships – Men's 1500 metres =

The men's 1500 metres event at the 2015 European Athletics Indoor Championships was held on 6 March at 18:00 (heats) and on 7 March at 16:30 (final) local time.

== Medalists ==
Gold	Silver	Bronze
Jakub Holuša; Czech Republic	Ilham Tanui Özbilen; Turkey	Chris O'Hare; Great Britain

== Results ==
=== Heats ===
Qualification: First 2 of each heat (Q) and the next 1 fastest (q) qualified for the final.

Rank	Heat	Athlete	Nationality	Time	Note
1	1	Homiyu Tesfaye	Germany	3:40.05	Q
2	1	Artur Ostrowski	Poland	3:40.24	Q, PB
3	1	John Travers	Ireland	3:41.37	q, PB
4	1	Diego Ruiz	Spain	3:41.48	
5	2	Chris O'Hare	Great Britain	3:41.83	Q
6	2	Ilham Tanui Özbilen	Turkey	3:42.23	Q
7	2	Joao Bussotti Neves Junior	Italy	3:42.82	
8	1	Dmitrijs Jurkevičs	Latvia	3:42.84	NR
9	1	Staffan Ek	Sweden	3:43.68	
10	2	Andreas Bueno	Denmark	3:43.79	
11	4	Jakub Holuša	Czech Republic	3:46.62	Q
12	2	Jan Friš	Czech Republic	3:47.16	
13	2	Amine Khadiri	Cyprus	3:47.61	
14	4	Valentin Smirnov	Russia	3:47.69	Q
15	4	Tamás Kazi	Hungary	3:48.08	
16	1	Jozef Pelikán	Slovakia	3:48.57	
17	4	Goran Nava	Serbia	3:48.80	
18	4	Johan Rogestedt	Sweden	3:48.88	
19	4	Danny Mooney	Ireland	3:48.96	
20	3	Charlie Grice	Great Britain	3:48.98	Q
21	3	Henrik Ingebrigtsen	Norway	3:49.36	Q
22	2	Krzysztof Żebrowski	Poland	3:49.76	
23	3	Yoann Kowal	France	3:49.99	
24	4	Filip Ingebrigtsen	Norway	3:50.15	
25	3	Marc Alcalá	Spain	3:50.46	
26	3	Szymon Krawczyk	Poland	3:51.72	
27	3	Milan Kocourek	Czech Republic	3:56.49	
28	3	Ramazan Özdemir	Turkey	3:59.54	

=== Final ===
Rank	Athlete	Nationality	Time	Note
1st place, gold medalist(s)	Jakub Holuša	Czech Republic	3:37.68	NR
2nd place, silver medalist(s)	Ilham Tanui Özbilen	Turkey	3:37.74	SB
3rd place, bronze medalist(s)	Chris O'Hare	Great Britain	3:38.96	SB
4	Homiyu Tesfaye	Germany	3:39.08	
5	Charlie Grice	Great Britain	3:39.43	PB
6	Henrik Ingebrigtsen	Norway	3:39.70	NR
7	John Travers	Ireland	3:41.50	
8	Valentin Smirnov	Russia	3:41.88	
9	Artur Ostrowski	Poland	3:44.98	
