= Samuel Tefera =

Ethiopian middle-distance runner

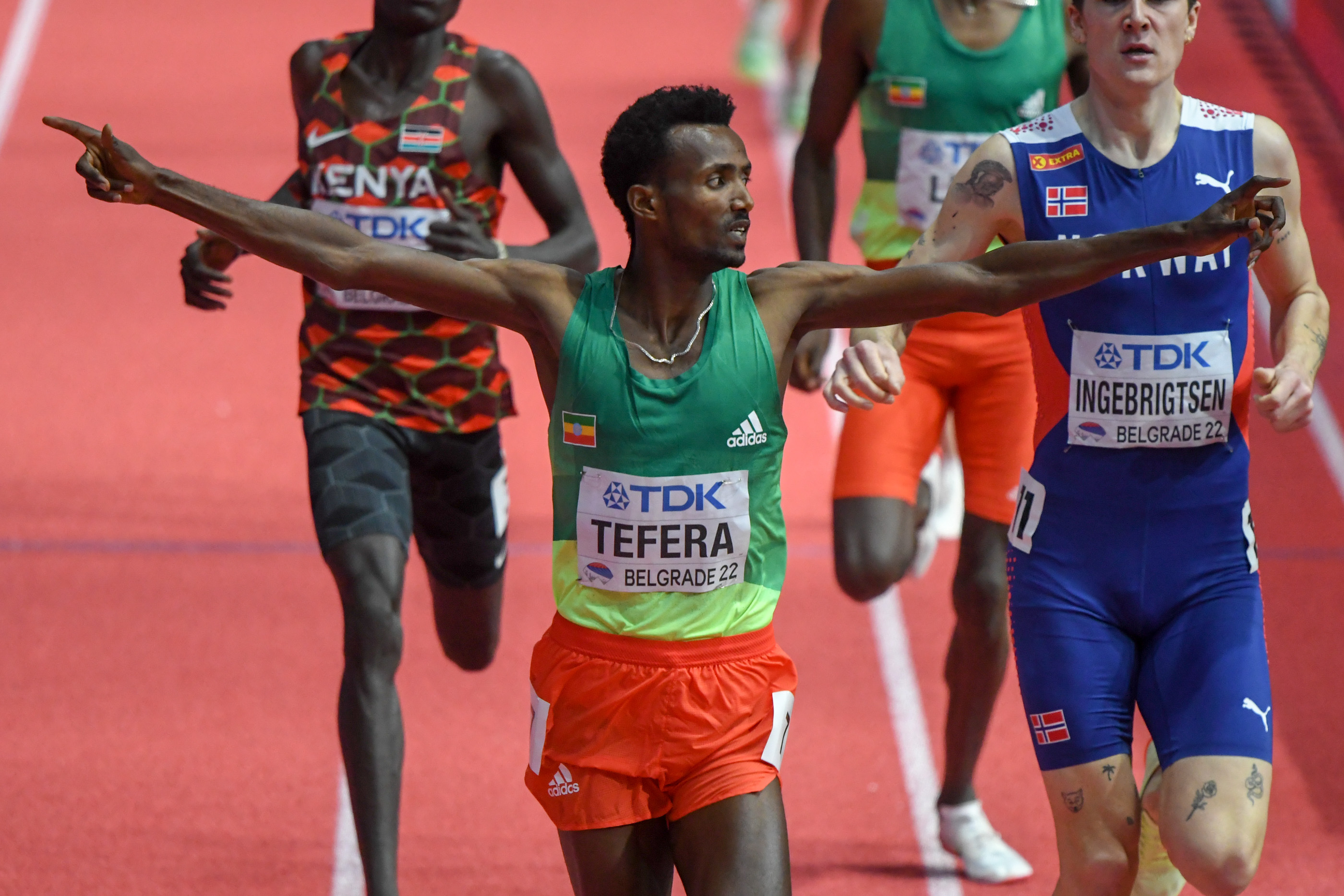
- Tefera at the 2022 World Indoor Championships in Belgrade

Personal information
- Nationality: Ethiopian
- Born: 23 October 1999 (age 26) Midakegn, Oromia, Ethiopia

Sport
- Sport: Athletics
- Events: 1500 metres, Mile

Achievements and titles
- Personal bests: Outdoors; 1500 m: 3:30.71 (Monaco 2021); Mile: 3:49.45 (London 2019); 5000 m: 12:53.44 (Paris 2025); Indoors; 1500 m: 3:31.04 AR (Birmingham 2019); Mile: 3:55.86 (Athlone 2020)
Medal record
Men's athletics
Representing Ethiopia
World Indoor Championships
Gold medal – first place	2018 Birmingham	1500 m
Gold medal – first place	2022 Belgrade	1500 m

Samuel Tefera Name (born 23 October 1999) is an Ethiopian middle-distance runner who specialises in the 1500 metres. At the age of 18, he became the 2018 World indoor champion, and defended his title at the 2022 World Indoor Championships, setting the championship record in the process. Tefera is the African indoor record holder for the 1500 m.

He held the world indoor 1500 m record for three years, with his mark currently being the second-fastest on the respective world all-time list.

== Career ==
Samuel Tefera made his first major appearance in 2017, when the then-17-year-old represented Ethiopia in the 1500 metres at the World Championships in London, not advancing from the heats.

In March 2018, he won the gold medal in the event at the World Indoor Championships held in Birmingham. He achieved 3:58.19 to beat Marcin Lewandowski (3:58.39) and Abdalaati Iguider (3:58.43).

In February 2019, still 19, Tefera set a world indoor record in his specialty distance at the Birmingham Indoor Grand Prix with a time of three minutes 31.04 seconds. He broke by 0.14 seconds a 22-year-old mark of Moroccan Hicham El Guerrouj. Tefera's record was bettered in 2022 by Jakob Ingebrigtsen.

After suffering an injury he did not finish his semifinal run at the 2019 World Championships in Doha. Timothy Cheruiyot won the title.

Tefera represented Ethiopia at the delayed 2020 Tokyo Olympics, where he had an injury problem again and was eliminated in the heats of the men's 1500 metres. Ingebrigtsen became the event winner.

At the 2022 World Indoor Championships in Belgrade, Tefera defended his title in a time of 3m 32.77s, beating Ingebrigtsen who ran 3:33.02, and setting the championship record in the process. Abel Kipsang finished third in 3:33.36.

== Competition record ==
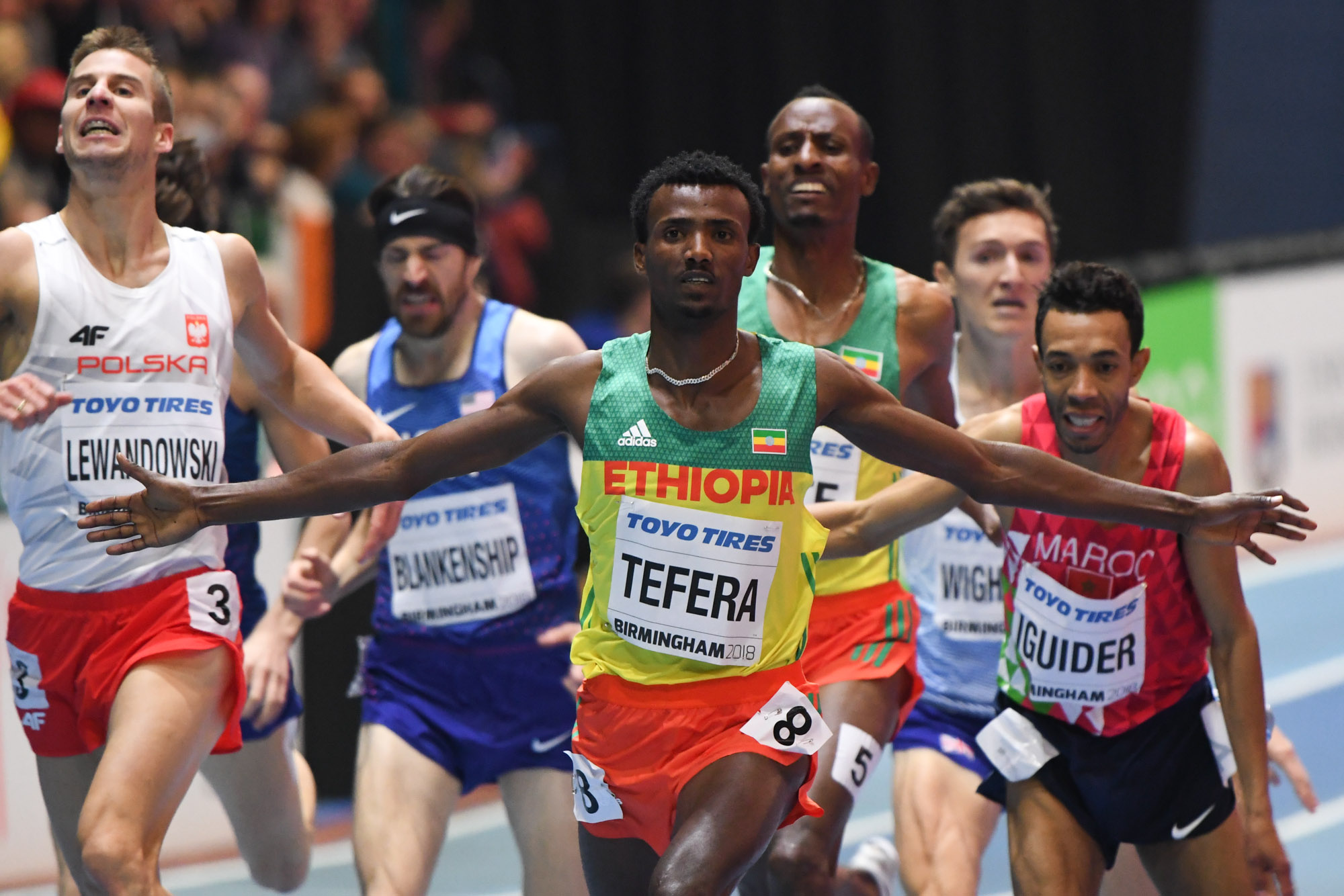
Tefera won his first world title with a 1500 m victory at the 2018 World Indoor Championships in Birmingham.

Representing Ethiopia
Year	Competition	Venue	Position	Event	Time
2017	World Championships	London, United Kingdom	h (31st)	1500 m	3:46.22
2018	World Indoor Championships	Birmingham, United Kingdom	1st	1500 m i	3:58.19
2018	World U20 Championships	Tampere, Finland	5th	1500 m	3:43.91
2018	African Championships	Asaba, Nigeria	10th	1500 m	3:45.38
2019	World Championships	Doha, Qatar	– (sf)	1500 m	DNF
2021	Olympic Games	Tokyo, Japan	20th (h)	1500 m	3:37.78
2022	World Indoor Championships	Belgrade, Serbia	1st	1500 m i	3:32.77 CR
2022	World Championships	Eugene, OR, United States	17th (sf)	1500 m	3:37.71
2024	World Indoor Championships	Glasgow, United Kingdom	7th	1500 m	3:38.10
2024	Olympic Games	Paris, France	14th (sf)	1500 m	3:33.02
