= Turkey at the 2013 World Championships in Athletics =

- WA code: TUR

in Moscow
- Competitors: 10
- Medals: Gold 0 Silver 0 Bronze 0 Total 0

World Championships in Athletics appearances (overview)
- 1983; 1987; 1991; 1993; 1995; 1997; 1999; 2001; 2003; 2005; 2007; 2009; 2011; 2013; 2015; 2017; 2019; 2022; 2023; 2025

Turkey competed at the 2013 World Championships in Athletics from August 10 to August 18 in Moscow, Russia. A team of 10 athletes was announced to represent the country in the event.

== Results ==
=== Men ===
==== Track events ====
Athlete	Event	Heats		Semifinals		Final	
Athlete	Event	Time	Rank	Time	Rank	Time	Rank
İlham Tanui Özbilen	1500 metres	3:39.31	20 Q	3:37.07	7	Did not advance	
Tarık Langat Akdağ	3000 metres steeplechase	8:34.97	30	—N/a		Did not advance	
Polat Kemboi Arıkan	10,000 metres	—N/a				DNF	

==== Field events ====
Athlete	Event	Preliminaries		Final	
Athlete	Event	Distance	Rank	Distance	Rank
Ercüment Olgundeniz	Discus throw	60.81	17	Did not advance	
Fatih Avan	Javelin throw	80.09	12	Did not advance	

=== Women ===
==== Road and track events ====
Athlete	Event	Heat		Final	
Athlete	Event	Distance	Rank	Distance	Rank
Tuğba Koyuncu	1500 metres	4:15.56	35	Did not advance	
Sultan Haydar	Marathon	—N/a		DNF	
Ümmü Kiraz	Marathon	—N/a		DNF	

==== Field events ====
Athlete	Event	Preliminaries		Final	
Athlete	Event	Distance	Rank	Distance	Rank
Burcu Ayhan	High jump	1.83	20	Did not advance	
Emel Dereli	Shot put	16.60	26	Did not advance	
