= Henok Tesfaye Heyi =

Ethiopian runner

Henok Tesfaye Heyi (born 23 February 1990) is an Ethiopian middle- and long-distance runner.

He represented Ethiopia twice in age category competitions. In the 800 metres at the 2007 World Youth Championships in Athletics he looked to take the lead in the final stages, but tripped on the inside curb of the track and ended the race in seventh. He competed in the same event at the 2008 World Junior Championships in Athletics but did not make the final on that occasion and was the fastest runner not to progress from the semi-finals.

In 2009 he moved to Turkey and signed up with a local running team, Kocaeli Büyükşehir Belediyesi. He won the 15K race at the Istanbul Marathon in October 2009 with a run of 45:18 minutes. He competed for his club at the European Clubs Cross Country Cup, placing 29th at the cross country running event in Bilbao. This was his last known appearance.

Henok's sudden disappearance from competition and similarity to Homiyu Tesfaye Heyi (an Ethiopian now competing for Germany who suddenly appeared in 2010) generated discussion. A number of German coaches and athletes claimed Henok and Homiyu were the same runner – a suggestion that would mean Homiyu would have been competing in age category competitions that he was too old for. Homiyu denied the resemblance or any knowledge of Henok.
