= Mitja Krevs =

Slovenian middle-distance runner

Personal information
- Nationality: Slovenian
- Born: 26 July 1989 (age 36) Celje, Slovenia

Sport
- Sport: Track, Long-distance running
- Event: 1500 metres

Achievements and titles
- Personal best(s): 800 metres: 1:48.10; 1500 metres: 3:40.64; Mile: 4:02.24; 5000 metres: 14:08.08; Half Marathon: 1:07:21

Mitja Krevs (born 26 July 1989) is a Slovenian middle-distance runner. He competed in the 1500 metres event at the 2014 IAAF World Indoor Championships.

== Running career ==
Krevs made his major international debut in the men's 1500 metres at the 2011 Summer Universiade, where he bowed out of the first round with a time of 3:55.34. Two years later, Krevs ran ten seconds faster at the 2013 Universiade in the 1500 metre, although still did not make it out of the first round due to extraordinary competition in the second heat. At the 2014 IAAF World Indoor Championships, Krevs set a Slovenian record in the indoor 1500 metres, running 3:43.22.
