= Francisco Javier Abad =

Spanish middle-distance runner

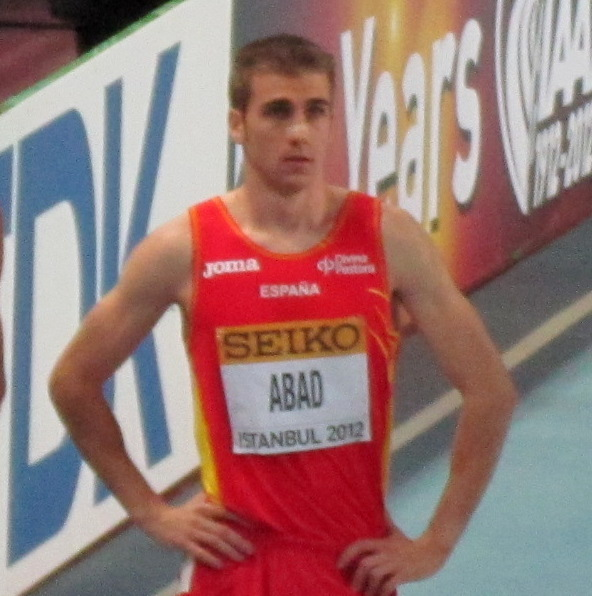
Francisco Javier Abad was the 2012 IAAF World Indoor Championships in Athletics

Francisco Javier Abad Sebastián (born 18 August 1981) is a Spanish middle-distance runner.

== Competition record ==
Year	Competition	Venue	Position	Event	Notes
Representing Spain
2012	World Indoor Championships	Istanbul, Turkey	8th	1500 m	3:48.14
2013	Mediterranean Games	Mersin, Turkey	6th	1500 m	3:40.06
2015	World Cross Country Championships	Guiyang, China	77th	12 km race	39:36
