= Marc Alcalá =

Spanish middle-distance runner

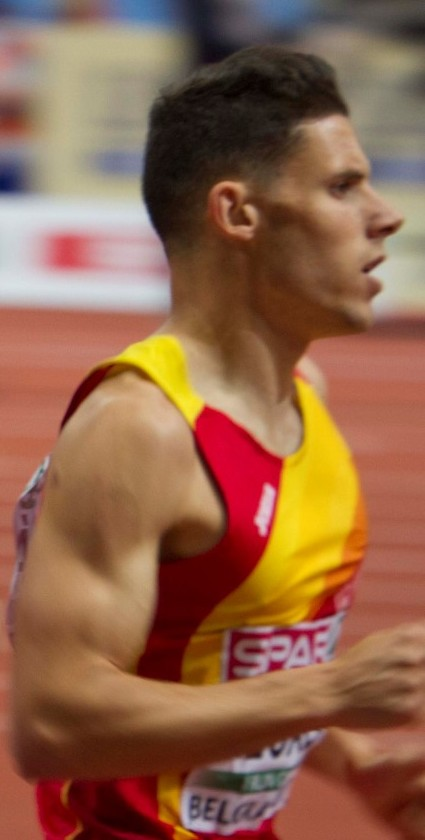

Personal information
- Born: 7 November 1994 (age 31) Barcelona, Spain
- Height: 1.75 m (5 ft 9 in)
- Weight: 68 kg (150 lb)

Sport
- Sport: Athletics
- Event: 1500 metres
- Club: FC Barcelona
- Coached by: José Antonio Prieto

Marc Alcalá Ibáñez (born 7 November 1994 in Barcelona) is a Spanish middle-distance runner who specialises in the 1500 metres. He represented his country at the 2016 World Indoor Championships narrowly missing the final. In addition, he won the gold medal at the 2015 European U23 Championships.

== Competition record ==
| Year | Competition | Venue | Position | Event | Notes |
Representing Spain
| 2011 | World Youth Championships | Lille, France | 22nd (h) | 1500 m | 3:58.50 |
| 2011 | European Youth Olympic Festival | Trabzon, Turkey | 15th | 1500 m | 4:13.82 |
| 2012 | World Junior Championships | Barcelona, Spain | 33rd (h) | 1500 m | 3:55.68 |
| 2013 | European Junior Championships | Rieti, Italy | 18th (h) | 1500 m | 3:51.17 |
| 2014 | Mediterranean U23 Championships | Aubagne, France | 1st | 1500 m | 3:51.74 |
| 2015 | European Indoor Championships | Prague, Czech Republic | 25th (h) | 1500 m | 3:50.46 |
| 2015 | European U23 Championships | Tallinn, Estonia | 1st | 1500 m | 3:44.54 |
| 2016 | World Indoor Championships | Portland, United States | 7th (h) | 1500 m | 3:42.02 |
| 2016 | European Championships | Amsterdam, Netherlands | 22nd (h) | 1500 m | 3:43.43 |
| 2017 | European Indoor Championships | Belgrade, Serbia | 4th | 1500 m | 3:46.36 |
| 2017 | World Cross Country Championships | Kampala, Uganda | 8th | 4 x 2 km mixed relay | 24:29 |
| 2017 | World Championships | London, United Kingdom | 21st (h) | 1500 m | 3:43.28 |
| 2018 | World Indoor Championships | Birmingham, United Kingdom | 9th (h) | 1500 m | 3:45.49 |
| 2018 | Mediterranean Games | Tarragona, Spain | 13th (h) | 1500 m | 3:48.03 |

== Personal bests ==
Outdoor

- 1000 metres – 2:19.41 (Barcelona 2015)
- 1500 metres – 3:35.85 (Monaco 2017)

Indoor

- 1000 metres – 2:20.45 (Stockholm 2016)
- 1500 metres – 3:39.33 (Sabadell 2016)
- 3000 metres – 7:58.28 (Sabadell 2016)
