= Valentin Smirnov (athlete) =

Russian middle-distance runner

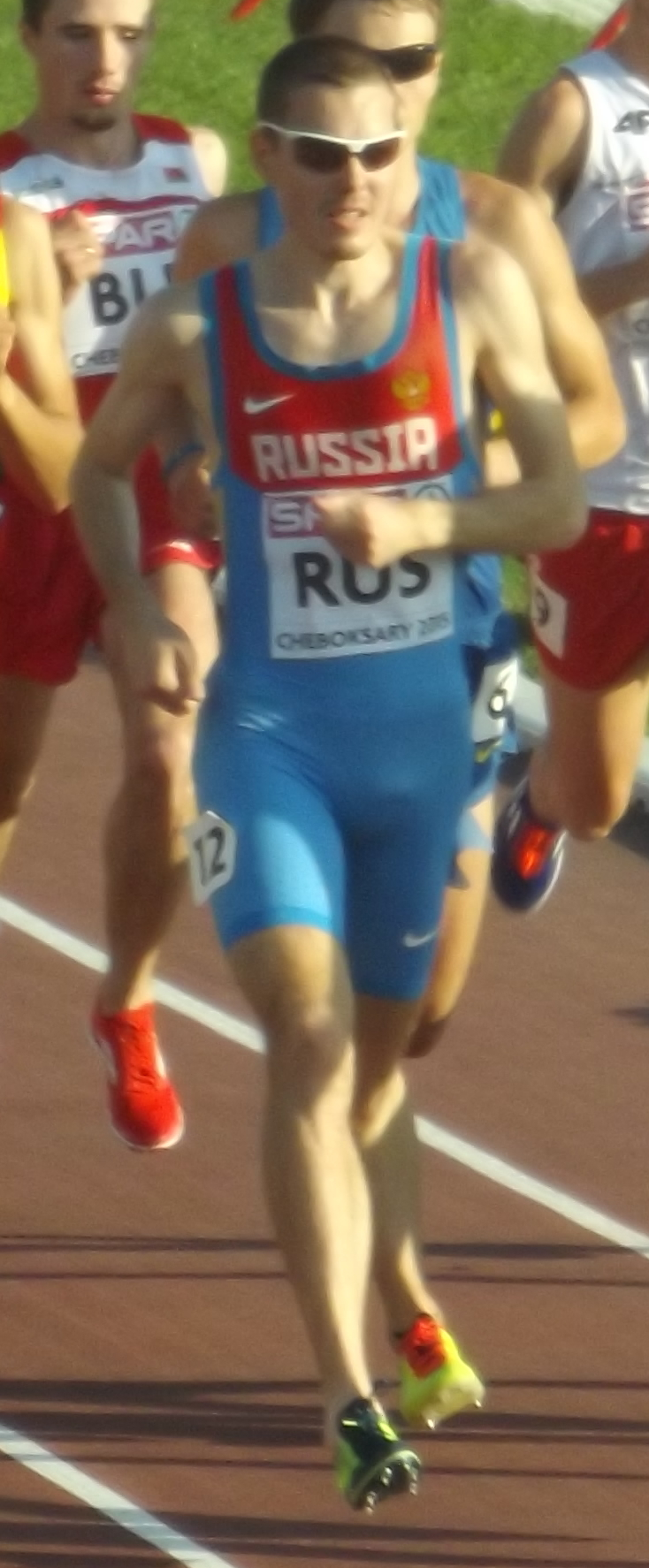
Valentin Smirnov at the 2015 European Team Championships

Valentin Sergeyevich Smirnov (Russian: Валентин Серге́евич Смирнов; born 13 February 1986) is a Russian middle-distance runner and athlete.

== International competitions ==
Year	Competition	Venue	Position	Event	Notes
Representing Russia
2010	European Team Championships	Bergen, Norway	3rd	3000 m	8:20.11
2011	European Indoor Championships	Paris, France	9th (h)	3000 m	8:29.23
2011	European Team Championships	Stockholm, Sweden	2nd	1500 m	3:38.89
2011	Universiade	Shenzhen, China	3rd	1500 m	3:48.45
2013	Universiade	Kazan, Russia	1st	1500 m	3:39.39
2013	World Championships	Moscow, Russia	24th (sf)	1500 m	3:46.03
2015	European Indoor Championships	Prague, Czech Republic	8th	1500 m	3:41.88
