= Abdalaati Iguider =

Moroccan middle-distance runner

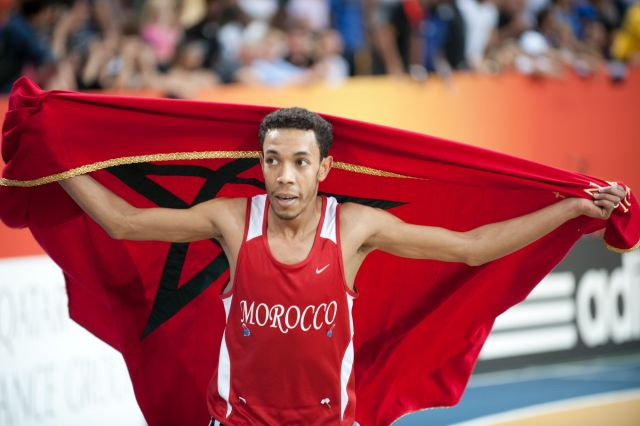

Personal information
- Born: 25 March 1987 (age 39) Errachida, Morocco
- Height: 1.70 m (5 ft 7 in)
- Weight: 52 kg (115 lb)

Sport
- Country: Morocco
- Turned pro: 2007
Medal record
Men's athletics
Representing Morocco
Olympic Games
Bronze medal – third place	2012 London	1500 m
World Championships
Bronze medal – third place	2015 Beijing	1500 m
World Indoor Championships
Gold medal – first place	2012 Istanbul	1500 m
Silver medal – second place	2010 Doha	1500 m
Bronze medal – third place	2014 Sopot	1500 m
Bronze medal – third place	2018 Birmingham	1500 m

Reda Abdalaati Iguider (Arabic: عبد العاطي إيكدير; born 25 March 1987) is a Moroccan runner who specializes in the 1500 metres. Over 1500 metres, he is the bronze medalist from the London Olympic Games and the 2012 World Indoor Champion. His personal best of 3:28:79 over 1500 metres, run in Monaco during the Herculis Diamond League Meeting on July 17, 2015, makes him the seventeenth fastest man ever over that distance. He also won the 2012 World Indoor Championships in the 1500 m event.

== Achievements ==
Year	Competition	Venue	Position	Event	Notes
Representing Morocco
2004	World Junior Championships	Grosseto, Italy	1st	1500 m	3:35.94 (CR)
2005	Islamic Solidarity Games	Mecca, Saudi Arabia	5th	1500 m	3:50.01
2006	World Junior Championships	Beijing, China	2nd	1500 m	3:40.73
2006	World Athletics Final	Stuttgart, Germany	11th	1500 m	3:35.88
2007	World Championships	Osaka, Japan	29th (q)	1500 m	3:43.25
2008	Olympic Games	Beijing, China	5th	1500 m	3:34.66
2009	Mediterranean Games	Pescara, Italy	3rd	1500 m	3:38.66
2009	World Championships	Berlin, Germany	11th	1500 m	3:38.35
2010	World Indoor Championships	Doha, Qatar	2nd	1500 m	3:41.96
2011	World Championships	Daegu, South Korea	5th	1500 m	3:36.56
2012	World Indoor Championships	Istanbul, Turkey	1st	1500 m	3:45.21
2012	Olympic Games	London, United Kingdom	3rd	1500 m	3:35.13
2012	Olympic Games	London, United Kingdom	6th	5000 m	13:44.19
2013	World Championships	Moscow, Russia	21st (sf)	1500 m	3:44.36
2015	World Championships	Beijing, China	3rd	1500 m	3:34.67
2016	World Indoor Championships	Portland, United States	4th	3000 m	7:58.04
2016	Olympic Games	Rio de Janeiro, Brazil	5th	1500 m	3:50.58
2017	World Championships	London, United Kingdom	17th (sf)	1500 m	3:40.76
2018	World Indoor Championships	Birmingham, United Kingdom	3rd	1500 m	3:58.43
2018	African Championships	Asaba, Nigeria	5th	1500 m	3:39.20
2019	African Games	Rabat, Morocco	4th	1500 m	3:38.59
2019	World Championships	Doha, Qatar	12th (sf)	1500 m	3:42.23

== Personal bests ==
- 800 metres - 1:46.67 (2015)
- 1000 metres - 2:19.14 (2007)
- 1500 metres - 3:28.79 (2015)
- Mile - 3:49.09 (2014)
- 3000 metres - 7:30.09 (2016)
- 5000 metres - 12:59.25 (2015)
- 1000 metres - Indoors - 2:19.33 (2005)
- 1500 metres Indoors - 3:34.10 (2012)
- 3000 metres Indoors - 7:34.92 (2013)
