= Aman Wote =

Ethiopian middle-distance runner

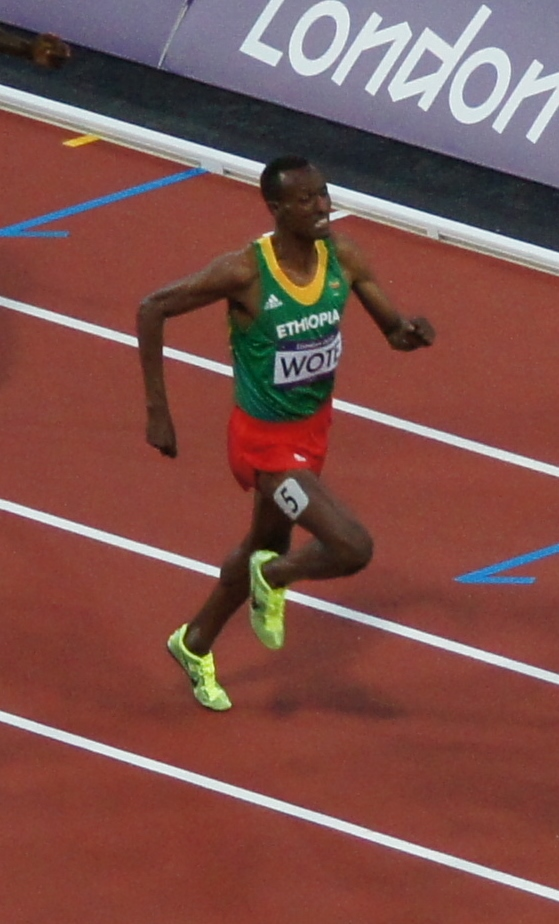
- Wote at the 2012 Summer Olympics

Personal information
- Nationality: Ethiopian
- Born: April 18, 1984 (age 42) Kabete, Oromia, Ethiopia

Sport
- Sport: Track
- Event: 1500 metres

Achievements and titles
- Personal bests: 800 metres: 1:44.99; 1500 metres: 3:29.91 NR; Mile: 3:48.60
Medal record
Athletics
Representing Ethiopia
World Indoor Championships
Silver medal – second place	2014 Sopot	1500 m
- Updated on 06-17-2014

Aman Wote Fete (Amharic: አማን ወጤ; born 18 April 1984) is an Ethiopian runner who specializes in mostly middle-distance events. He represented Ethiopia at the 2012 Summer Olympics.

== Running career ==
A late bloomer in the international stage, although a prolific runner from an early age in Kabet, Wote ran his first big international race at the 2010 African Championships, where he ran the 1500 metres in 3:38.89. At the 2012 Summer Olympics, Wote ran the 1500 metres in 3:41.67, missing qualification to the next round by less than 0.3 seconds.

== Achievements ==
Year	Competition	Venue	Position	Event	Notes
Representing Ethiopia
2010	African Championships	Nairobi, Kenya	7th	1500 m	3:38.89
2011	All-Africa Games	Maputo, Mozambique	5th	1500 m	3:41.04
2012	World Indoor Championships	Istanbul, Turkey	4th	1500 m	3:47.02
2012	Olympic Games	London, United Kingdom	39th (h)	1500 m	3:41.67
2013	World Championships	Moscow, Russia	8th (sf)	1500 m	3:36.94
2014	World Indoor Championships	Sopot, Poland	2nd	1500 m	3:38.08
2014	IAAF World Relays	Nassau, Bahamas	3rd	4 × 1500 m	14:41.22
2014	Herculis	Monaco	6th	1500m	3:29.91
2015	World Championships	Beijing, China	—	1500 m	DNF
2016	World Indoor Championships	Portland, United States	6th	1500 m	3:44.86
2018	World Indoor Championships	Birmingham, United Kingdom	4th	1500 m	3:58.64
2018	African Championships	Asaba, Nigeria	5th	1500 m	3:38.49
