= İlham Tanui Özbilen =

Kenyan-Turkish middle-distance runner

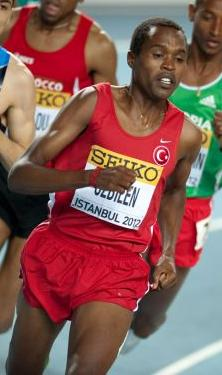

Personal information
- Nationality: Turkey
- Born: William Biwott Tanui; 5 March 1990 (age 36) Kocholwo, Keiyo District, Kenya
- Height: 1.77 m (5.8 ft)
- Weight: 60 kg (132 lb)

Sport
- Sport: Middle-distance
- Coached by: Patrick Sang Kenya

Achievements and titles
- Personal bests: 1500 m : 3:31.30 (2013); One mile : 3:49.29 (2009); 800m : 1:44.00 (2013); 1500m indoors : 3:34.76 (2012)
Medal record
Men's athletics
Representing Turkey
World Indoor Championships
Silver medal – second place	2012 Istanbul	1500 m
European Indoor Championships
Silver medal – second place	2013 Gothenburg	1500 m
Silver medal – second place	2015 Prague	1500 m
European Team Championships
Gold medal – first place	2013 Gateshead	1500 m
Silver medal – second place	2013 Gateshead	800 m
Islamic Solidarity Games
Gold medal – first place	2013 Palembang	1500 m
Silver medal – second place	2013 Palembang	4×400 m relay
Bronze medal – third place	2013 Palembang	800 m
Mediterranean Games
Gold medal – first place	2013 Mersin	800 m
Gold medal – first place	2013 Mersin	1500 m

İlham Tanui Özbilen (born William Biwott Tanui on 5 March 1990 in Kocholwo, Kenya) is a middle distance runner now representing Turkey. The 1.77 m (5.8 ft) tall athlete weighs 60 kg (130 lb). He is coached by Kenyan Patrick Sang.

== Career in Kenya ==
Özbilen, then competing as William Biwott Tanui, won the 1500 metres at the 2009 World Athletics Final in Thessaloniki, Greece. He holds the current world junior record in the mile run with his clocking of 3:49.29 minutes, achieved in Oslo on 3 July 2009. He was also part of the Kenyan team (with Gideon Gathimba, Geoffrey Kipkoech Rono and Augustine Kiprono Choge) that set a new world record of 14:36.23 in the rarely contested 4 x 1500 metres relay at the 2009 Memorial Van Damme Golden League meeting in Brussels, Belgium.

== Turkish citizenship ==
He switched allegiance to Turkey in June 2011, changing his name to İlham Tanui Özbilen. His surname was given him by his godfather and manager Önder Özbilen, who persuaded him in December 2010 in Kenya to immigrate to Turkey. He moved in February 2011 to Turkey, and was naturalized on 8 June 2011. While he would normally have been ineligible to internationally represent his adoptive country until 8 June 2013, it was announced in February 2012 that he had received permission from the International Association of Athletics Federations (IAAF) to compete for Turkey starting with the 2012 World Indoor Championships in Istanbul.

İlham Tanui Özbilen won the silver medal for Turkey in the 1500 m event at the 2012 IAAF World Indoor Championships held in Istanbul, Turkey. Özbilen also represented Turkey at the 2012 Summer Olympics in London, where he made the final of the 1500 meters, finishing 8th, with a time of 3:36.72. At the 2013 Mediterranean Games held in Mersin, Turkey, he became gold medalist in the 1500 m event.

At the 2013 Islamic Solidarity Games held in Palembang, Indonesia, he won a gold medal in the 1500 m event, a bronze medal in the 800 m event and a silver medal in the 4x400 m relay event with his teammates Batuhan Altıntaş, Halit Kılıç and Mehmet Güzel.

In 2015, Özbilen competed in the 1500 metres at the European Indoor Championships. He came second place with a time 3:37.74, behind Jakub Holuša, the national record holder in the 1500 metres for the Czech Republic.

== World records ==
- 4x1500 m relay: 14:36.23 minutes (2009, Memorial Van Damme)

== International competitions ==
Year	Competition	Venue	Position	Event	Notes
Representing Kenya
2009	World Athletics Final	Thessaloniki, Greece	1st	1500 m	3:35.04
Representing Turkey
2012	World Indoor Championships	Istanbul, Turkey	2nd	1500 m	3:45.35
2013	European Team Championships Super League	Gateshead, United Kingdom	2nd	800 m	1:47.39
2013	European Team Championships Super League	Gateshead, United Kingdom	1st	1500 m	3:38.57
2013	European Indoor Championships	Gothenburg, Sweden	2nd	1500 m	3:37.22
2013	Mediterranean Games	Mersin, Turkey	1st	800 m	1:44.00 GR
2013	Mediterranean Games	Mersin, Turkey	1st	1500 m	3:35.09
2013	Islamic Solidarity Games	Palembang, Indonesia	3rd	800 m	1:45.65
2013	Islamic Solidarity Games	Palembang, Indonesia	1st	1500 m	3:39.69
2013	Islamic Solidarity Games	Palembang, Indonesia	2nd	4×400 m relay	3:06.43
2015	European Indoor Championships	Prague, Czech Republic	2nd	1500 m	3:37.74
2015	World Championships	Beijing, China	22nd (sf)	1500 m	3:45.70
2016	Olympic Games	Rio de Janeiro, Brazil	35th (h)	1500 m	3:49.02
2018	Mediterranean Games	Tarragona, Spain	11th	1500 m	3:48.27
2025	World Championships	Tokyo, Japan	55th	Marathon	2:23:35
