= Jakub Holuša =

Czech middle-distance runner

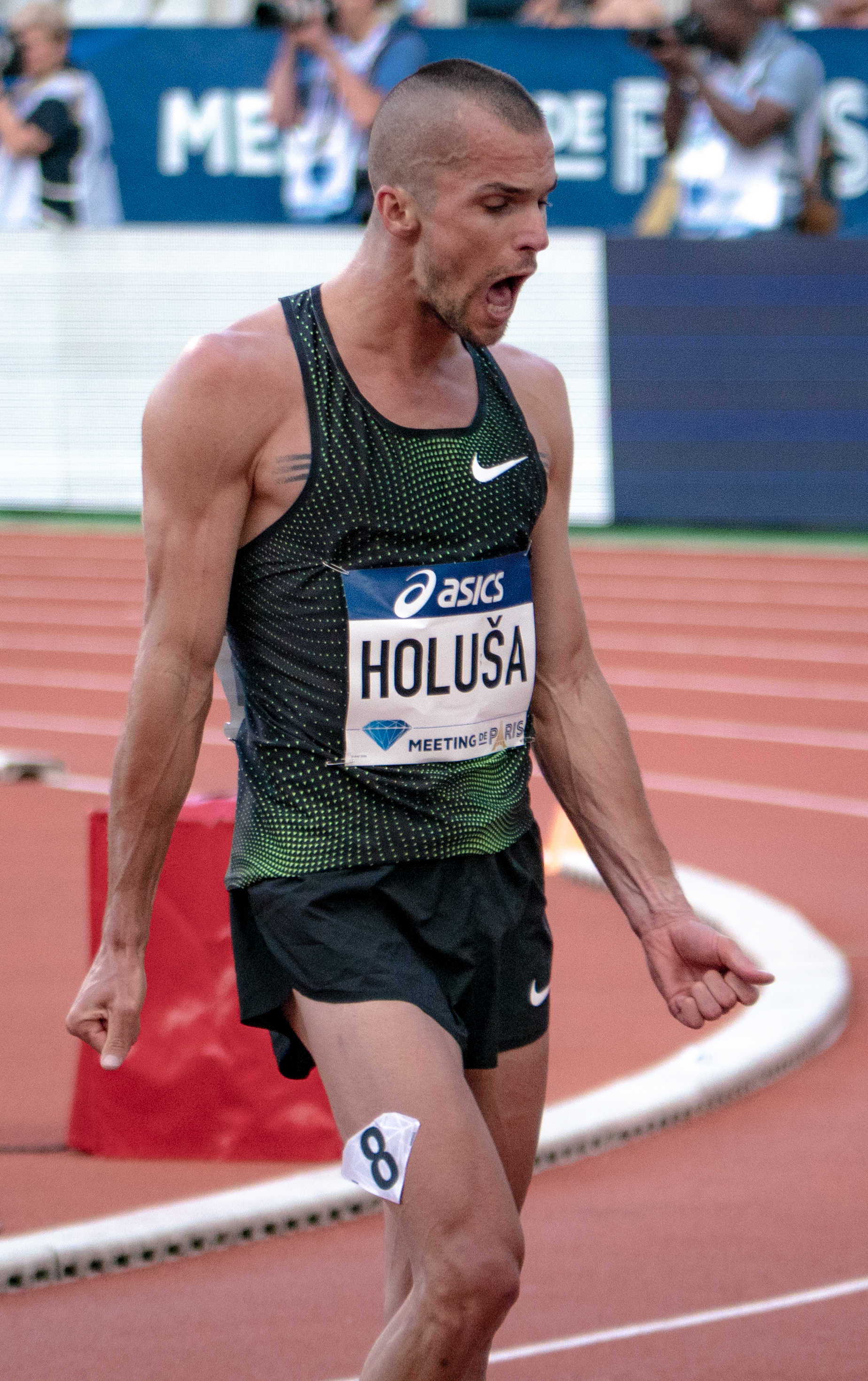
- Holuša at the 2018 Meeting de Paris

Personal information
- Nationality: Czech
- Born: 20 February 1988 (age 38) Opava, Czechoslovakia
- Height: 1.83 m (6 ft 0 in)
- Weight: 72 kg (159 lb)

Sport
- Sport: Track
- Club: ASC Dukla Praha
- Coached by: Tomasz Lewandowski

Achievements and titles
- Personal bests: 800m: 1:45.12; 1500m: 3:32.49; Mile: 3:53.46; 3000m: 7:51.39
Medal record
World Indoor Championships
Silver medal – second place	2012 Istanbul	800 m
Silver medal – second place	2016 Portland	1500 m
European Indoor Championships
Gold medal – first place	2015 Prague	1500 m
European U23 Championships
Bronze medal – third place	2009 Kaunas	1500 m
European Junior Championships
Gold medal – first place	2007 Hengelo	3000 m steeplechase
- Updated on October 14, 2018

Jakub Holuša (Czech pronunciation: [ˈjakub ˈɦoluʃa], born 20 February 1988) is a former Czech middle-distance runner. He represented his country in the men's 800 meters at the 2008 and 2012 Summer Olympics. At the 2016 Olympics, he competed in the 1500 meters. He particularly excelled in indoor racing, winning a number of medals over 800 and 1500 meters at international championship competitions.

== Running career ==
Holuša first took up athletics in the steeplechase discipline. He made his international debut at the 2005 World Youth Championships in Athletics, where he finished seventh overall in the boys' 2000-meter steeplechase. He gradually switched from training for the steeplechase to focusing on the 800 meters, for which he qualified for the 2008 Summer Olympics. After many years of racing as an 800-meter runner, he broke out in the 1500 meters when he ran a sub-3:40 result in the men's 1500 at the World Indoor Championships. He subsequently became Europe's 1500-meter indoor champion when he placed first at the 2015 European Indoor Championships.

In February 2022, he retired from elite competitive racing and became a coach at the Dukla Prague athletics club.

== International competitions ==
Year	Competition	Venue	Position	Event	Notes
Representing Czech Republic
2007	European Junior Championships	Hengelo, Netherlands	1st	3000 m s'chase	8:50.30
2008	World Indoor Championships	Valencia, Spain	24th (h)	800 m	1:51.09
2008	Olympic Games	Beijing, China	41st (h)	800 m	1:48.19
2009	European U23 Championships	Kaunas, Lithuania	9th (h)	800 m	1:49.63
2009	European U23 Championships	Kaunas, Lithuania	3rd	1500 m	3:51.46
2010	World Indoor Championships	Doha, Qatar	5th	800 m	1:47.28
2010	European Championships	Barcelona, Spain	5th	800 m	1:47.45
2011	European Indoor Championships	Paris, France	5th	1500 m	3:41.57
2012	World Indoor Championships	Istanbul, Turkey	2nd	800 m	1:48.62
2012	European Championships	Helsinki, Finland	5th	800 m	1:48.99
2012	European Championships	Helsinki, Finland	5th	4x400 metres relay	3:02.72 NR
2014	World Indoor Championships	Sopot, Poland	5th	1500 m	3:39.23
2015	European Indoor Championships	Prague, Czech Republic	1st	1500 m	3:37.68 NR
2015	World Championships	Beijing, China	30th (h)	1500 m	3:43.66
2016	World Indoor Championships	Portland, United States	2nd	1500 m	3:44.30
2016	Olympic Games	Rio de Janeiro, Brazil	17th (sf)	1500 m	3:40.83
2017	World Championships	London, United Kingdom	5th	1500 m	3:34.89
2018	World Indoor Championships	Birmingham, United Kingdom	10th (h)	1500 m	3:45.84
2018	European Championships	Berlin, Germany	24th (h)	1500 m	3:49.82
2019	World Championships	Doha, Qatar	32nd (h)	1500 m	3:39.79

== Personal bests ==
Outdoor

- 800 m 1:45.12 (11 May 2012, Doha, Qatar)
- 1000 m 2:16.79 (17 June 2014, Ostrava, Czech Republic)
- 1500 m 3:32.49 (20 July 2018, Monaco) - NR
- 3000 m 7:51,39 (2017, France)
- 3000 m steeplechase 8:50.30 (20 July 2007, Hengelo, Netherlands)

Indoor

- 800 m 1:46.09 (31 January 2010, Karlsruhe, Germany)
- 1000 m 2:18.27 (17 February 2016, Stockholm, Sweden)
- 1500 m 3:37.68 (8 March 2015, Prague, Czech Republic)
