= Homiyu Tesfaye =

Ethiopian-German middle-distance runner

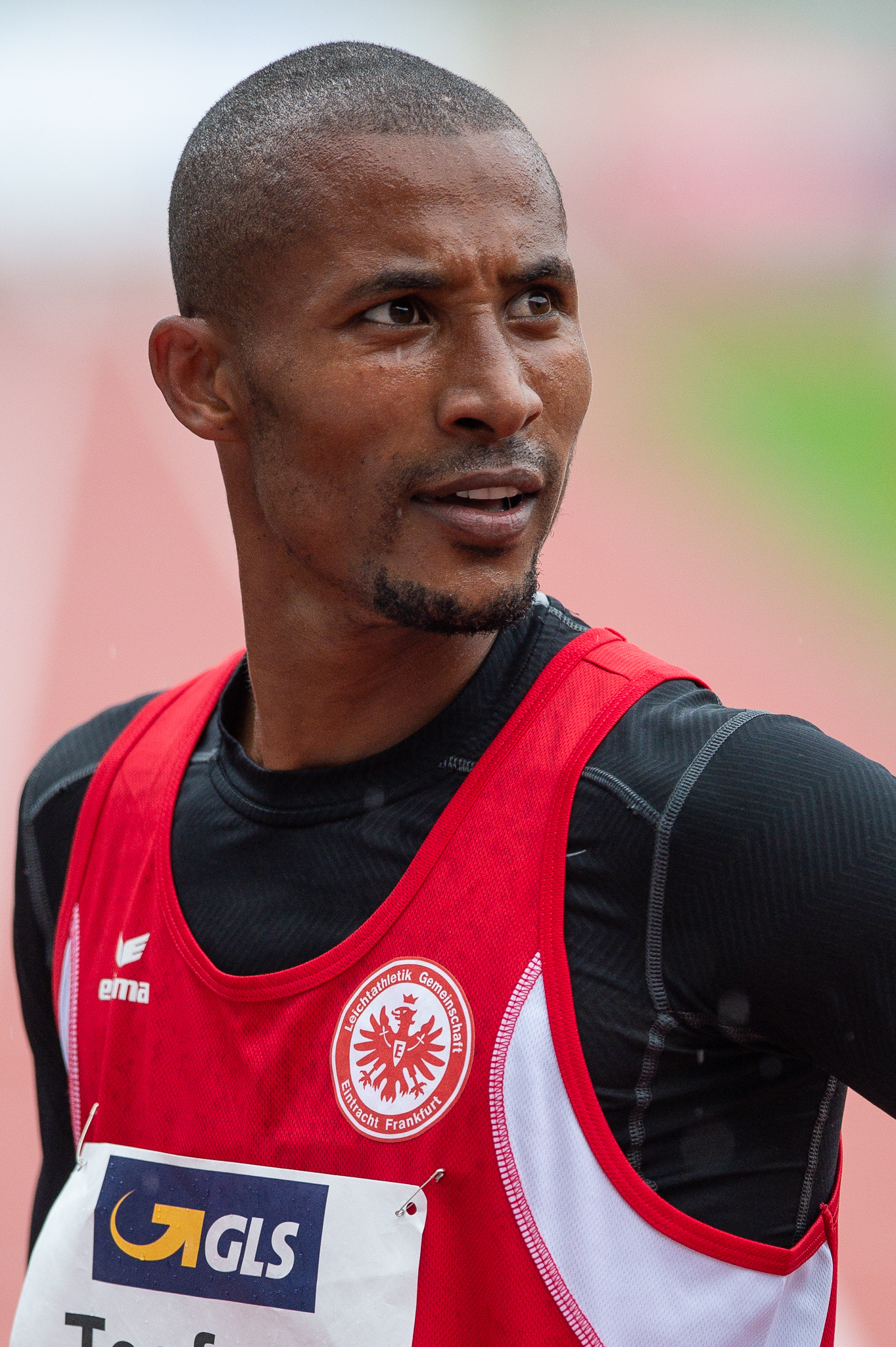
Homiyu Tesfaye in 2018

Homiyu Tesfaye Heyi (born 23 June 1993) is an Ethiopian-German middle- and long-distance runner.

After claiming political asylum he began competing for Germany and came fifth in the 1500 metres at the 2013 World Championships in Athletics. He won his first German indoor title in 2012 and claimed his first outdoor title (over 10,000 metres) the following year.

A winner of numerous German under-20 and under-23 titles, he was accused of being Henok Tesfaye Heyi (an Ethiopian runner who is three years older) and thus of falsifying his age in competition.

== Career ==
Born in Debre Zeyit near Addis Ababa in Ethiopia, Homiyu claimed right of asylum in Frankfurt am Main in 2010 and began training with athletics coach Wolfgang Heinig at the LG Eintracht Frankfurt sport club. He began competing in Germany the following year and reached national competitions in 2012. He won the German indoor title in the 1500 metres, then placed third at the 2012 German Athletics Championships. He also won the junior (under-20) titles over 3000 metres and 5000 metres, as well as the German under-23 1500 m title.

2013 marked his breakthrough as a runner internationally as he gained German citizenship that June. He was runner-up in the 1500 m at the German indoors and took the 10,000 metres national title. A physical exchange with Robin Schembera over 800 m at the 2013 German Athletics Championships saw Homiyu fall and hurt his leg after finishing just behind the native German. Three weeks previously, Homiyu had taunted his opponents after winning the German under-23 title by doing press ups by the finish line while his opponents were still racing – Schembera remarked that beating Homiyu was "a matter of honour". Homiyu improved his personal best in the 1500 m to 3:34.76 minutes and gained selection for the 2013 World Championships in Athletics as a result. In the World Championships 1500 m he finished in fifth place – the best finish by a German athlete in over twenty years. He finished the year with a personal best run of 3:34.18 minutes at the Weltklasse Zürich meeting and a win at the Trierer Silvesterlauf.

His rise as a runner generated much discussion among the German athletics scene and coverage in the German press. Some were concerned at the presence of a foreign-born runner quickly acquiring German citizenship and being selected for the national team, although Carsten Schlangen (a native 1500 m runner) said he hoped Homiyu's presence would encourage German runners to better themselves, rather than serve as a way of limiting international experience for German-born runners. The greatest topic of discussion was whether Homiyu was committing age fraud – coaches and other athletes mentioned that he looked very similar (and had a very similar name) to Henok Tesfaye Heyi, a runner who represented Ethiopia over 800 m at the 2008 World Junior Championships in Athletics. Henok, whose birthdate was three years older than that of Homiyu's, had suddenly disappeared from international competition the same year that Homiyu claimed asylum in Germany. Race photos also showed the two having worn the same running strip. Critics claimed this meant Homiyu had won several German age category titles that he was too old to compete in. His coach, Wolfgang Heinig, sharply criticised those who made the claims and Homiyu denied the resemblance and claimed he did not know the runner who shared his family names.

Michael Reinsch, a journalist from the Frankfurter Allgemeine Zeitung, a nationwide daily newspaper, was initially denied an interview with the Hessen Athletics Association on the grounds of a gagging order. A limited press session was later agreed with the attendance of Thomas Kurschilgen, sports director of the Deutscher Leichtathletik-Verband (German Athletics Association), to dismiss the rumours. Reinsch revealed that age verification had not been undertaken by the Hessen Athletics Association that admitted him and also stated that political asylum seekers are often issued with new names and birthdates so as to protect them from being persecuted abroad.

Homiyu was free to compete the following indoor season and was runner-up at the Birmingham Indoor Grand Prix before taking the 1500 m and 3000 m titles at the 2014 German indoor championships.
