= Silas Kiplagat =

Kenyan middle-distance runner

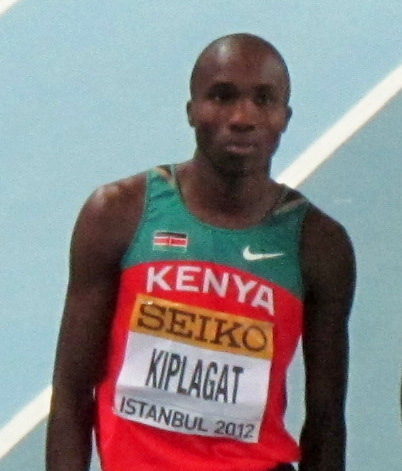
- Kiplagat at the 2012 World Indoor Championships

Personal information
- Born: 20 August 1989 (age 37) Siboh Village, Marakwet District, Kenya
- Height: 1.70 m (5 ft 7 in) (2012)
- Weight: 56 kg (123 lb) (2012)

Achievements and titles
- Personal best: 1500 m: 3:27:64 (2014)
Medal record
Men's athletics
Representing Kenya
World Championships
Silver medal – second place	2011 Daegu	1500 m
Commonwealth Games
Gold medal – first place	2010 New Delhi	1500 m
- Updated on 7 August 2012

Silas Kiplagat (born 20 August 1989) is a Kenyan middle-distance runner who specialises in the 1500 metres. He has a personal best of 3:27.64 minutes, which makes him the seventh fastest of all-time over the distance.

Born in Siboh Village, Marakwet District, he started training in seriousness for competitive running in 2008 after completing Chebara high school in Marakwet district. He met Sammy Kitwara and the professional trained with him and introduced him to his coach, Moses Kiptanui, a three-time world champion in the steeplechase. He initially wanted to follow Kitwara into longer distances, but Kiptanui recognised his speed and urged him to try shorter events instead.

He tried his hand at cross country running and was seventeenth at the Kenyan National Cross Country Championships. An appearance at the World's Best 10K in Puerto Rico saw him finish in tenth place. It was only when he ran in the 1500 metres that he showed his true athletic potential: he won the race at the Kenya Prisons Championships and then was runner-up at the National Championships, beaten only by the reigning Olympic champion Asbel Kiprop. Italian coach Renato Canova assisting him technically introduced him to the Italian manager Gianni Demadonna that signed him up, gaining him a place in the 1500 m at the Herculis meeting in Monaco.

His European debut marked a meteoric arrival onto the elite athletics scene – not only did he outrun more experienced runners such as Amine Laâlou and Augustine Choge, but he improved his personal best time by five seconds of 3:29.27 and raised himself into the top ten fastest runners ever for the event. He gained selection for the event at the 2010 African Championships in Athletics and he just missed out on a medal, finishing fourth behind Mekonnen Gebremedhin. He returned to Europe and won at the Internationales Stadionfest and was second at the Rieti Meeting to Asbel Kiprop. After the close of the European summer track and field circuit, he represented Kenya at the 2010 Commonwealth Games in New Delhi. He and James Magut completed a Kenyan 1–2 as Kiplagat became the Commonwealth champion with a tactical performance to beat defending champion Nick Willis.

He won silver at the 2011 World Championships, in a time of 3:35.92.

He competed at the 2012 Summer Olympics, finishing in 7th place in the finals, with a time of 3:36.19.
