= Vincent Kibet =

Kenyan middle-distance runner

Personal information
- Born: 6 May 1991 (age 35)

Sport
- Country: Kenya
- Sport: Track and field
- Event: 1500 metres

Vincent Kibet (born 6 May 1991) is a Kenyan middle-distance runner, who specializes in the 1500 metres.

== Personal bests ==
Outdoor

- 800 metres – 1:46.71 (Solihull 2014)
- 1500 metres – 3:31.96 (Rieti 2014)
- Mile – 3:51.17 (Eugene 2017)
- 3000 metres – 7:50.54 (Rabat 2017)

Indoor

- 1000 metres – 2:19.93 (Metz 2015)
- 1500 metres – 3:34.91 (Birmingham 2015)
- Mile – 3:56.09 (Boston 2017)
- 3000 metres – 7:44.87 (Karlsruhe 2016)
