= Chris O'Hare =

Scottish athlete (born 1990)

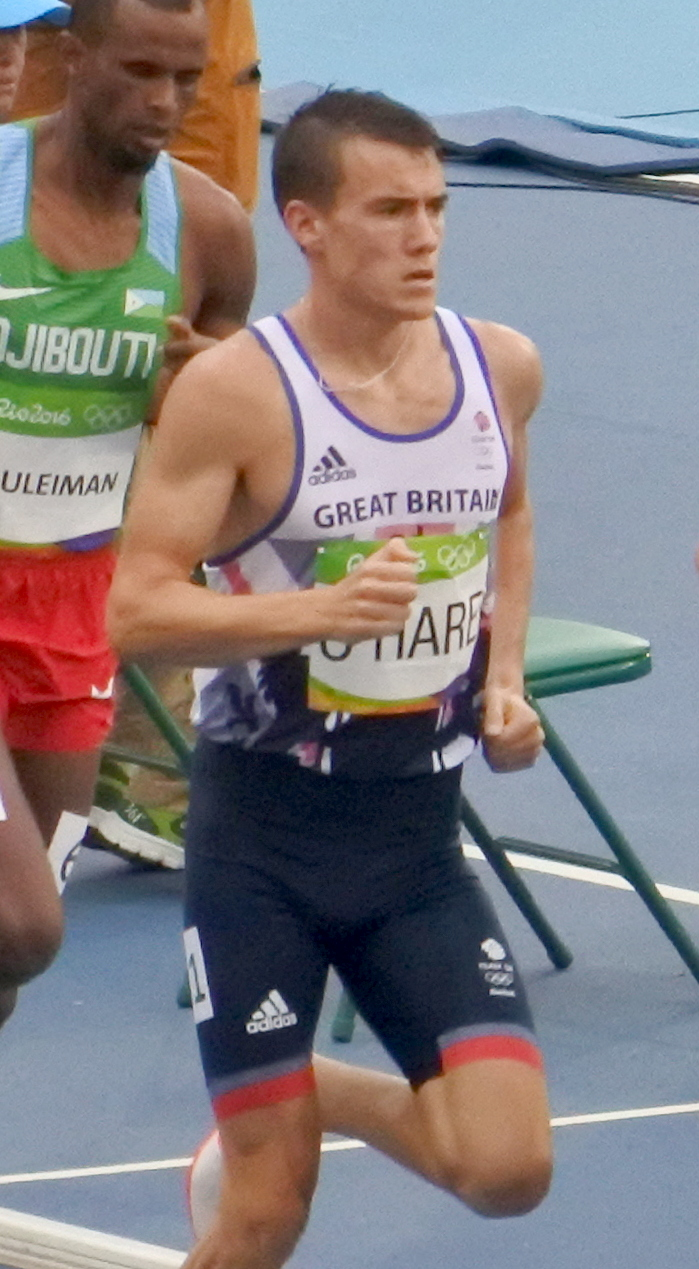
- O'Hare at the 2016 Olympics

Personal information
- Born: 23 November 1990 (age 35) West Linton, Peeblesshire, Scotland
- Height: 178 cm (5 ft 10 in)
- Weight: 63 kg (139 lb)

Sport
- Sport: Track and field
- Events: 1500 m, mile
- College team: Tulsa Golden Hurricane
- Club: Edinburgh AC
- Coached by: Terrence Mahon

Achievements and titles
- Personal bests: 1500 meters: 3:32.11; Indoor mile: 3:52.91
Medal record
Representing Great Britain
European Championships
Bronze medal – third place	2014 Zürich	1500 m
European Indoor Championships
Bronze medal – third place	2015 Prague	1500 m
Silver medal – second place	2019 Glasgow	3000 m

Christopher O'Hare (born 23 November 1990) is a Scottish former middle-distance runner who competes in the 1500 metres. He has represented Scotland at the 2014 Commonwealth Games and Great Britain at the 2016 Olympic Games.

== Personal life ==
O'Hare was born and brought up in West Linton and attended Peebles High School. He subsequently completed a degree in sports science at the University of Tulsa in the United States, together with his sister Olivia. His younger brother Dominic competed in middle-distance running in Scotland.

O'Hare is married and is a fan of Celtic FC.

== Running career ==
O'Hare was first recruited by University of Tulsa, where he specialized in the 800 m, 1500 m, and mile events. At the 2011 NCAA DI Indoor Track & Field Championships, O'Hare was runner-up in the men's mile behind Miles Batty from BYU.

O'Hare won the Mile at the NCAA Men's Division I Indoor Track and Field Championships 2012 with a time of 4:01.66

O'Hare was selected for the 1500 m at the 2013 IAAF World Athletics Championships in Moscow after he became the first Scottish athlete in over 35 years to top the UK rankings at the distance. At the Worlds he qualified for the final, where he finished 12th, becoming the first British athlete to qualify for the 1500 m final for six years.

O'Hare competed in the 1500 metres event at the 2014 IAAF World Indoor Championships. O'Hare ran in the 1500 m at the 2014 Commonwealth Games in Glasgow, where he finished sixth. O'Hare ran in 2014 European Athletics Championships – Men's 1500 metres where he earned bronze medal and finished third.

O'Hare competed in 2015 European Athletics Indoor Championships – Men's 1500 metres where he earned bronze medal and finished third.

O'Hare was selected to compete in the 1500 metres event at the 2016 Olympic Games. He progressed from the heats, but having come eleventh in his semi-final he didn't reach the final.

He was a three-times British 1500 metres champion after winning the British Athletics Championships in 2013, 2017 and 2018.
