= Nick Willis =

New Zealand middle-distance runner

Nick Willis MNZM
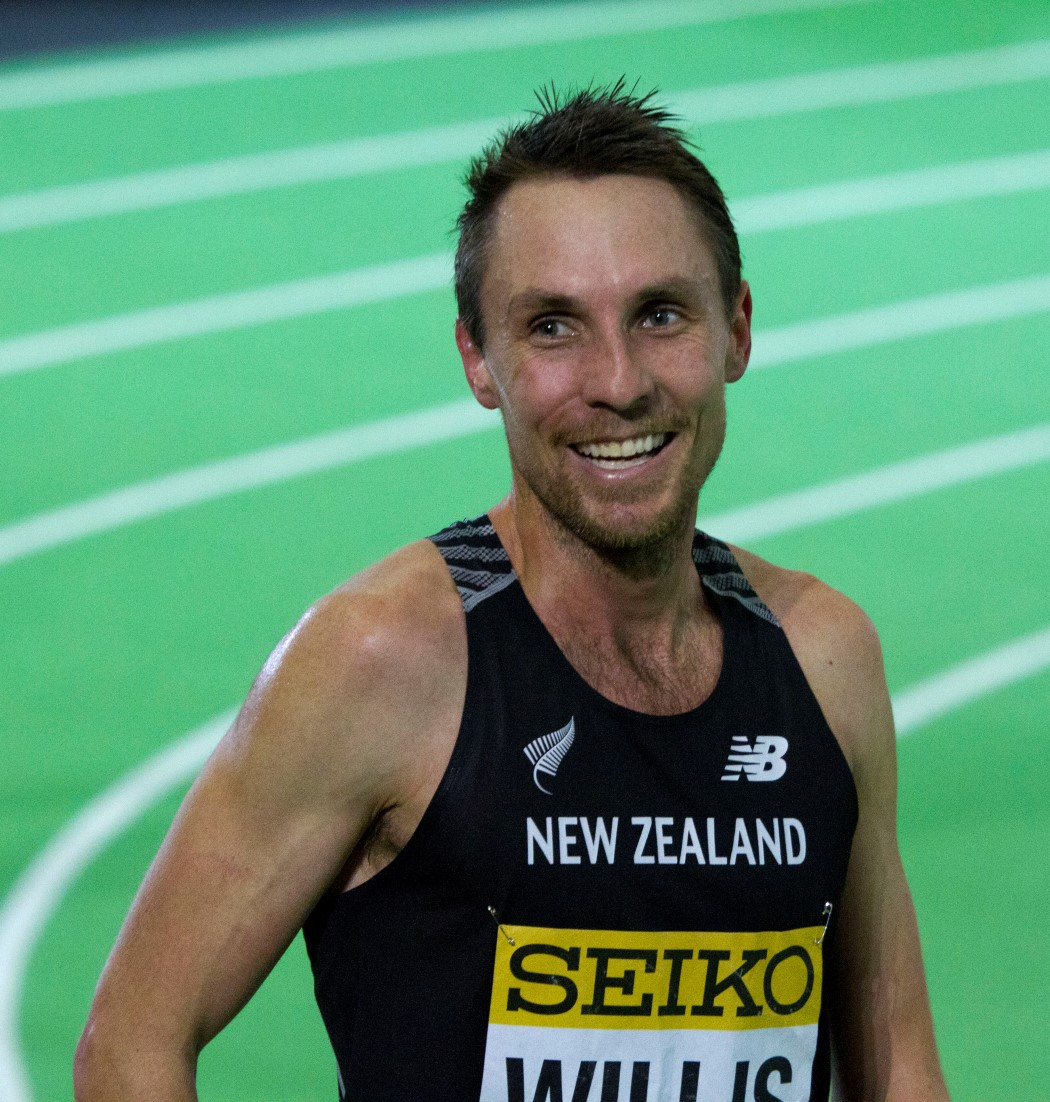
- Willis at the 2016 World Indoor Championships

Personal information
- Born: Nicholas Ian Willis; 25 April 1983 (age 43) Lower Hutt, New Zealand
- Education: University of Michigan
- Height: 183 cm (6 ft 0 in)
- Weight: 68 kg (150 lb)

Sport
- Country: New Zealand
- Sport: Track
- Event: 1500 metres
- College team: Michigan
- Coached by: Ron Warhurst

Achievements and titles
- Personal bests: 800m: 1:45.54; 1500m: 3:29.66 AR; Mile: 3:49.83; 3000m: 7:36.91; 5000m: 13:20.33
Medal record
Olympic Games
Silver medal – second place	2008 Beijing	1500 m
Bronze medal – third place	2016 Rio de Janeiro	1500 m
World Indoor Championships
Bronze medal – third place	2016 Portland	1500 m
Commonwealth Games
Gold medal – first place	2006 Melbourne	1500 m
Bronze medal – third place	2010 Delhi	1500 m
Bronze medal – third place	2014 Glasgow	1500 m
World Cup
Silver medal – second place	2006 Athens	1500 m

Nicholas Ian Willis MNZM (born 25 April 1983) is a New Zealand former middle-distance runner and the country's only two-time Olympic medalist in the 1500 metres. He won the silver medal at the 2008 Olympics in Beijing, and bronze at the 2016 Olympics in Rio De Janeiro. His other achievements over the same distance include the national and Oceania record (3:29.66), and medals from three consecutive Commonwealth Games (gold in 2006, bronze in 2010 and 2014).

== Early life ==
Willis was born in and grew up in Lower Hutt, New Zealand, where he went to Hutt Valley High School and was coached by Don Dalgliesh before attending University of Michigan in the United States on a full athletic scholarship. His brother, Steve Willis, is also an athlete, and they are the only brothers in the history of New Zealand to have both broken 4:00 minutes for the mile.

In 2000, Willis won the 800m and 1500m double at the New Zealand Secondary Schools Championships. On the 20th of January, 2001, Willis became the fastest New Zealand secondary school student over the mile, with a time of 4 min 1.33 s.

== Career ==
In 2005, at the Golden League series in Paris, France, Willis broke John Walker's 32-year-old national record for the 1500m. Willis then won a Gold Medal at the 2006 Commonwealth Games, which he completed in 3:38.49 minutes, and two first placings at the New Zealand Track & Field Championships in 2006, with a time of 3:50.77 minutes, and 2008, which he ran in 3:44.46 minutes. His IAAF world ranking was 16 in May 2007.

=== 2008: Olympic silver medalist ===
Willis won the 1500m silver medal in the 2008 Summer Olympics. He originally placed third but the eventual disqualification of Rashid Ramzi due to a positive drug test saw Willis's bronze medal upgraded to silver, which he received in 2011. On 2 May 2018, it was announced that Asbel Kiprop of Kenya, who was declared the champion on Ramzi's disqualification, had tested positive for the banned performance-enhancing drug EPO Although this raises the possibility of Kiprop being disqualified and Willis being declared champion it is highly unusual for any drug sanction to cover more than a few years.

In the first 1500m heat Willis placed second in a time of 3:36.01. After running at the back of the field for the first few laps he took the lead on the final lap eventually finishing ahead of Mehdi Baala. Willis ran in the second 1500m semi-final where the pace was so slow that during the race he told the other competitors to "pick up the pace" so that more of them would have a chance to qualify. With 250m to go Willis was almost boxed in and had to force his way into the clear eventually finishing fifth in a time of 3:37.54 to qualify for the final. In the final Willis stayed at the back of the pack of runners for most of the race. Working his way through the field, he was in sixth place with 200m to go. Along the home straight he passed three runners, holding off Baala on the line to win the bronze medal in 3:34.16. With the disqualification of the race winner Rashid Ramzi on 18 November 2009 due to a positive drug test, Willis was upgraded to the silver medal.

In conclusion to his 2008 season, Willis won the Fifth Avenue Mile race in New York City, beating out twice-world champion Bernard Lagat of the United States by 0.1 seconds. Willis was the first New Zealander to win the race since John Walker in 1984.

In the 2009 New Year Honours, Willis was appointed a Member of the New Zealand Order of Merit, for services to athletics.

=== 2010: Surgery and comeback ===
During 2010, Willis underwent knee surgery. He came fifth in the Fifth Avenue Mile race and although he was the defending champion in the 1500m, his form leading into the 2010 Commonwealth Games was not his best. He managed to win the bronze medal in the event and said afterward that he was looking forward to training injury-free.

=== 2011 ===
Willis didn't receive his 2008 Olympic silver medal until 26 February 2011. The presentation was originally scheduled for an international track meet in Christchurch, but the earthquake on 22 February caused that event to be cancelled. Instead, Willis received his medal at a fundraising track meet organised in response to the earthquake and held at Newtown Park in Wellington. It was presented by International Olympic Committee member and 1976 gold medallist Barry Maister. It was the first Olympic medal ceremony held in New Zealand. At the same meet, Willis ran a sub-four-minute mile.

=== 2012 ===
In July 2012 Willis set the Oceania 1500m record with a run of 3:30.35 at the Monaco Diamond League Herculis meeting. He placed third in the race, and his time was also an improvement on his own New Zealand record.

==== London Olympics ====
On 27 July he was officially named the Olympic flag bearer for New Zealand at London 2012.

Willis was the oldest runner to make the final of the 1500m, in which he placed 9th – a result he described as "heart-breaking" and "a bit embarrassing". Algerian Taoufik Makhloufi won in 3:34.08s, with Willis clocking 3:36.94. Reflecting on this result in 2013, Willis conceded that he'd peaked three weeks too early at Monaco, and consequently "ran out of steam".

=== 2014 ===
Over a 66-day period (15 May – 20 July) leading up to the Glasgow Commonwealth Games, Willis ran his best times over four different distances. Two of those runs doubled as new national records.

He began with a time of 13m 20.33s over 5000m on 15 May. On 11 June he became the second New Zealander after Sir John Walker to break 3m 50s over a mile when he finished second at the Bislett Games in Oslo. Six days later, he shaved 0.58s off Walker's 31-year-old record for 3000m at Ostrava in the Czech Republic, clocking 7m 36.91s. Then on 20 July, racing in a Diamond League event in Monaco, he reduced the New Zealand 1500m record to 3m 29.91s.

This 1500m time came on the same track that he set national records on in 2011 and 2012, and made Willis the 27th man to beat the 3m30s barrier. He placed seventh in an uncommonly fast race: the runners who finished fourth through seventh all ran the quickest ever times for their places in the field.

==== Glasgow Commonwealth Games ====
Entering the Commonwealth Games 5000m for the first time, and believing that he had "nothing to lose", Willis finished tenth. Amongst the New Zealanders in the field he was third of three, with Zane Robertson taking bronze.

Robertson's twin brother, Jake, was also in the 5000m race but tripped after a collision involving Willis. At the time Jake Robertson said that the incident was "the way things go", but five days later he told reporters that he would "not forget[...]the reason I fell in the 5K, including Nick Willis." Invited to comment, Willis only shrugged off "sensationalist journalism".

Willis also ran the 1500m at those games. He qualified directly for the final, winning the first heat in 3.40.76. In the final Willis overtook South African Johan Cronje with his last three steps to take bronze in 3:39.60. Frustrated at himself, Willis believed he'd timed his race badly and saw his third placing as a "respectable finish" that he had to "salvage" from the race. "It was only my fitness that got me to that medal, not any tactical nous, or brilliance or planning."

=== 2016 ===
In early 2016 Willis won his first World Indoor Championship medal, taking bronze in the 1500m final behind future Olympic champion Matt Centrowitz and Jakub Holuša.

Willis qualified for his third successive 1500m Olympic final, finishing 6th in his heat and third in his semi-final. In the final, the first two laps were run at an extremely slow pace. During the final straight Willis moved into third place about 50 metres from the finish. While he could not close the gap to Makloufi and Centrowitz, he maintained his position across the line to claim the bronze medal. After the race, Willis said that taking the bronze was "incredibly satisfying...it's the personal satisfaction that we corrected all the wrongs from London."

In finishing third, Willis became the oldest man to win an Olympic medal in the 1500 metres, and the 8th man to have won two 1500m Olympic medals.

=== 2021 ===
On 19 January 2021 Willis broke 4 minutes in the mile for a record 19th year in a row, running a 3:58.05 mile at the Orange Winter Classic meet in Clermont, Florida. This broke a tie with fellow New Zealander John Walker, who broke the 4-minute mile barrier every year from 1973-1990.

=== 2022 ===
On 29 January 2022 Willis extended the record for consecutive years with a sub-four minute mile when he broke 4 minutes in the mile for a 20th year in a row, running a 3:59.71 mile at the Millrose Games at the Armory in New York City.

== Personal bests ==
Distance	Time	Place	Date
800 m	1:45.54	Heusden-Zolder	2004
1000 m	2:16.58	Linz	2012
1500 m	3:29.66 NR, AR	Monaco	17 July 2015
Mile	3:49.83	Oslo, Norway	2014
3000 m	7:36.91 NR	Ostrava, Czech Republic	2014
5000 m	13:20.33	Los Angeles, California	2014

== Personal life ==
Willis married Sierra Boucher on 30 September 2007 with whom he has three sons. They currently reside in Ann Arbor, Michigan.

Olympic Games
Preceded by Mahé Drysdale	Flagbearer for New Zealand; London 2012	Succeeded by Peter Burling
