= 2016 Diamond League =

2016 IAAF Diamond League
- Edition: 7th
- Dates: 6 May – 9 September
- Events: 32
- Meetings: 14
- Individual Prize Money (US$): US$ 8 million

The 2016 IAAF Diamond League was the seventh season of the annual series of outdoor track and field meetings, organised by the International Association of Athletics Federations (IAAF).

The 2016 series saw three changes to the format. One of the two American meetings, the Adidas Grand Prix held in New York, was dropped from the calendar in favour of the Rabat Meeting in Morocco. This was the first meeting on the calendar to be held in Africa, which had previously been the only northern hemisphere continent not represented on the Diamond League. The second major change was an amendment to the point scoring system. The former model of four points for the winner, two for runner-up and one for third was overhauled with a broader points system giving ten to the winner, six the runner-up and progressively fewer points down to sixth place. The system of double points for the event finals was retained. A third change was the compression of the field events – throws and horizontal jumps allowed three attempts for all athletes, then the top four athletes at that point of the competition were permitted an additional three attempts (as opposed to the previous format of all athletes receiving six attempts).

== Format ==
=== Diamond Race events ===
The programme for Diamond Race events remained unchanged, with a total of 32 events divided evenly between the sexes. On the track, six running events were included for each of the sexes, from 100 metres up to 5000 metres, and all Olympic hurdles and steeplechase events featured. In the field events, all traditional four jumps were contested and three of the four traditional throwing events were held. Hammer throw remained absent due to restrictions of stadium size. The parallel IAAF Hammer Throw Challenge series catered for that event.

The attempt format for throws and horizontal jumps was amended so that each athlete received three attempts, then the top four athletes received an additional three attempts. This change followed a similar arrangement that was introduced at the 2016 IAAF World Indoor Championships. The announcement of the change received a mixed reaction from athletes and fans.

Diamond Race track events
Men	100 m	200 m	400 m	800 m	1500 m	5000 m	110 m hurdles	400 m hurdles	3000 m steeplechase
Women	100 m	200 m	400 m	800 m	1500 m	5000 m	100 m hurdles	400 m hurdles	3000 m steeplechase

Diamond Race field events
Men	Pole vault	High jump	Long jump	Triple jump	Shot put	Discus throw	Javelin throw
Women	Pole vault	High jump	Long jump	Triple jump	Shot put	Discus throw	Javelin throw

=== Points ===
Performances in each of the Diamond Races events received points according to the finishing position of the athletes. The winner of the Diamond Race is the athlete with the greatest number of points by the end of the series. In the event of a tie on points, the victor is the athlete with the most race wins that year. The series winners receive a Diamond Trophy and US$40,000.

Place	Points (non-final)	Points (final)
1st	10	20
2nd	6	12
3rd	4	8
4th	3	6
5th	2	4
6th	1	2

== Schedule ==
The following fourteen meetings are scheduled to be included in the 2016 season:

Date	Meet	Stadium	City	Country
6 May	Qatar Athletic Super Grand Prix	Qatar SC Stadium	Doha	Qatar
14 May	Shanghai Golden Grand Prix	Shanghai Stadium	Shanghai	China
22 May	Meeting International Mohammed VI d'Athlétisme de Rabat	Prince Moulay Abdellah Stadium	Rabat	Morocco
27–28 May	Prefontaine Classic	Hayward Field	Eugene	United States
2 June	Golden Gala – Pietro Mennea	Stadio Olimpico	Rome	Italy
5 June	British Athletics Grand Prix	Alexander Stadium	Birmingham	United Kingdom
9 June	Bislett Games	Bislett Stadium	Oslo	Norway
16 June	Bauhausgalan	Stockholm Olympic Stadium	Stockholm	Sweden
15 July	Herculis	Stade Louis II	Monaco	Monaco
22–23 July	Muller Anniversary Games	London Stadium	London	United Kingdom
25 August	Athletissima	Stade Olympique de la Pontaise	Lausanne	Switzerland
27 August	Meeting de Paris	Stade de France	Paris	France
1 September	Weltklasse Zürich	Letzigrund	Zürich	Switzerland
9 September	Memorial Van Damme	King Baudouin Stadium	Brussels	Belgium

== Winners ==
Events not included in the Diamond League are marked in grey background.

=== Men ===
==== Track ====
#	Meeting	100 m	200 m	400 m	800 m	1500 m	5000 m	110 m h	400 m h	3000 m st
1	Doha	-	Ameer Webb (USA); 19.85 MR	LaShawn Merritt (USA); 44.41	-	Asbel Kiprop (KEN); 3:32.15 WL	-	Omar McLeod (JAM); 13.05 WL	-	Conseslus Kipruto (KEN); 8:05.13 WL
2	Shanghai	Justin Gatlin (USA); 9.94 SB	-	-	Ferguson Cheruiyot Rotich (KEN); 1:45.68 SB	-	Muktar Edris (ETH); 12:59.96 WL, MR	Omar McLeod (JAM); 12.98 WL	Michael Tinsley (USA); 48.90 WL	-
3	Rabat	-	Alonso Edward (PAN); 20.07w	LaShawn Merritt (USA); 44.66 MR	Pierre-Ambroise Bosse (FRA); 1:44.51 SB	Timothy Cheruiyot (KEN); 3:33.61 PB	Abdalaati Iguider (MAR); 7:36.85 WL (3000 m)	David Oliver (USA); 13.12 MR	-	Conseslus Kipruto (KEN); 8:02.77 WL, MR
4	Eugene	Justin Gatlin (USA); 9.88w	-	Kirani James (GRN); 44.22	Boris Berian (USA); 1:44.20 SB	Asbel Kiprop (KEN); 3:51.54 WL (Mile)	Muktar Edris (ETH); 12:59.43 WL	Omar McLeod (JAM); 13.06	Michael Tinsley (USA); 48.74 SB	-
5	Rome	Justin Gatlin (USA); 9.93 SB	Ameer Webb (USA); 20.04	Wayde van Niekerk (RSA); 44.19	-	Elijah Manangoi (KEN); 3:33.96	-	Orlando Ortega (ESP); 13.22	-	Conseslus Kipruto (KEN); 8:01.41 WL
6	Birmingham	Kim Collins (SKN); 10.11	Andre De Grasse (CAN); 20.16 SB	Kirani James (GRN); 44.23 MR	David Rudisha (KEN); 1:13.10 AR, WL, MR (600 m)	Asbel Kiprop (KEN); 3:29.33 WL, MR	Mo Farah (GBR); 7:32.62 WL, NR (3000 m)	-	-	Conseslus Kipruto (KEN); 8:00.12 WL, MR
7	Oslo	Andre De Grasse (CAN); 10.07 SB	-	-	-	Asbel Kiprop (KEN); 3:51.48 WL(Mile)	Hagos Gebrhiwet (ETH); 13:07.70	-	Yasmani Copello (TUR); 48.79 SB	-
8	Stockholm	Jak Ali Harvey (TUR); 10.18	-	-	Ferguson Cheruiyot Rotich (KEN) 1:45.07	-	Ibrahim Jeilan (ETH); 13:03.22	-	Javier Culson (PUR); 49.43	-
9	Monaco	-	Alonso Edward (PAN); 20.10	Wayde van Niekerk (RSA); 44.12	Alfred Kipketer (KEN); 1:44.47	Ronald Kwemoi (KEN); 3:30.49 SB	-	Orlando Ortega (ESP); 13.04 SB	-	Conseslus Kipruto (KEN); 8:08.11
10	London	Jimmy Vicaut (FRA); 10.02	Usain Bolt (JAM); 19.89	Matthew Hudson-Smith (GBR); 45.03	Pierre-Ambroise Bosse (FRA); 1:43.88 SB	Silas Kiplagat (KEN); 3:53.04 SB (Mile)	Mo Farah (GBR); 12:59.29 WL	Dimitri Bascou (FRA); 13.20	Kerron Clement (USA); 48.40 SB	-
11	Lausanne	Asafa Powell (JAM); 9.96	Churandy Martina (NED); 19.81 NR	LaShawn Merritt (USA); 44.50	-	Ayanleh Souleiman (DJI); 2:13.49 (1000 m)	-	Orlando Ortega (ESP); 13.11	Rasmus Mägi (EST); 48.59	Abraham Kibiwot (KEN); 8:09.58
12	Paris	Ben Youssef Meïté (CIV); 9.96 =NR	-	-	Alfred Kipketer (KEN); 1:42.87 PB	-	Yomif Kejelcha (ETH); 7:28.19 WU20R WL (3000 m)	-	Nicholas Bett (KEN); 48.01 SB	-
13	Zurich	Asafa Powell (JAM); 9.94	-	LaShawn Merritt (USA); 44.64	-	-	Hagos Gebrhiwet (ETH); 13:14.82	-	Kerron Clement (USA); 48.72	-
14	Brussels	-	Julian Forte (JAM); 19.97 PB	Luguelín Santos (DOM); 45.02	Adam Kszczot (POL); 1:44.36	Timothy Cheruiyot (KEN); 3:31.34 PB	-	Orlando Ortega (ESP); 13.08	-	Conseslus Kipruto (KEN); 8:03.74
Overall winner		Asafa Powell (JAM)	Alonso Edward (PAN)	LaShawn Merritt (USA)	Ferguson Cheruiyot Rotich (KEN)	Asbel Kiprop (KEN)	Hagos Gebrhiwet (ETH)	Orlando Ortega (ESP)	Kerron Clement (USA)	Conseslus Kipruto (KEN)

==== Field ====
#	Meeting	Long jump	Triple jump	High jump	Pole vault	Shot put	Discus	Javelin
1	Doha	-	Christian Taylor (USA); 17.23 WL	Erik Kynard (USA); 2.33 WL	-	-	Piotr Małachowski (POL); 68.03 WL	-
2	Shanghai	Gao Xinglong (CHN); 8.14 SB	-	Bohdan Bondarenko (UKR); 2.28	Sam Kendricks (USA); 5.88 PB	Kurt Roberts (USA); 21.40 SB	-	Thomas Röhler (GER); 85.71
3	Rabat	Rushwahl Samaai (RSA); 8.38 =MR	-	Bohdan Bondarenko (UKR); 2.31 SB	-	-	Piotr Małachowski (POL); 67.45 MR	-
4	Eugene	-	Christian Taylor (USA); 17.76 WL, MR	-	Renaud Lavillenie (FRA); 5.81	Joe Kovacs (USA); 22.13 WL	-	Ihab Abdelrahman (EGY); 87.37 WL, MR
5	Rome	Greg Rutherford (GBR); 8.31 SB	-	Bohdan Bondarenko (UKR); 2.33 SB	-	-	Robert Urbanek (POL); 65.00	-
6	Birmingham	Marquise Goodwin (USA); 8.42	-	Mutaz Essa Barshim (QAT); 2.37 WL	-	-	Piotr Małachowski (POL); 67.50	-
7	Oslo	-	Alexis Copello (CUB); 16.91	-	Renaud Lavillenie (FRA); 5.80	Joe Kovacs (USA); 22.01	-	Thomas Röhler (GER); 89.30 WL
8	Stockholm	-	Christian Taylor (USA); 17.59	-	Renaud Lavillenie (FRA); 5.73	Tomas Walsh (NZL); 21.13	-	Ihab Abdelrahman (EGY); 86.00
9	Monaco	Damar Forbes (JAM); 8.23 SB	-	Gianmarco Tamberi (ITA); 2.39 NR	-	-	Piotr Małachowski (POL); 65.57	-
10	London	Gao Xinglong (CHN); 8.11	Christian Taylor (USA); 17.79 WL, MR	-	Renaud Lavillenie (FRA); 5.90	Joe Kovacs (USA); 22.04	-	Jakub Vadlejch (CZE); 85.72
11	Lausanne	-	-	Mutaz Essa Barshim (QAT); 2.35	Sam Kendricks (USA); 5.92 MR	-	Philip Milanov (BEL); 65.61	-
12	Paris	-	Chris Carter (USA); 16.92	-	Renaud Lavillenie (FRA); 5.93	Tomas Walsh (NZL); 22.00 AR MR	-	Jakub Vadlejch (CZE); 88.02 PB
13	Zurich	-	Christian Taylor (USA); 17.80 MR	-	Sam Kendricks (USA); 5.90	Tomas Walsh (NZL); 22.20 AR	-	Jakub Vadlejch (CZE); 87.28
14	Brussels	Luvo Manyonga (RSA); 8.48 PB	–	Erik Kynard (USA); 2.32	-	–	Daniel Ståhl (SWE); 65.78	–
Overall winner		Fabrice Lapierre (AUS)	Christian Taylor (USA)	Erik Kynard (USA)	Renaud Lavillenie (FRA)	Tomas Walsh (NZL)	Piotr Małachowski (POL)	Jakub Vadlejch (CZE)

=== Women ===
==== Track ====
#	Meeting	100 m	200 m	400 m	800 m	1500 m	5000 m	100 m h	400 m h	3000 m st
1	Doha	Tori Bowie (USA); 10.80 WL, MR	-	-	Caster Semenya (RSA); 1:58.26 WL	-	Almaz Ayana (ETH); 8:23.11 WL (3000 m)	-	Eilidh Doyle (GBR); 54.53 WL	-
2	Shanghai	-	Murielle Ahouré (CIV); 22.72	Shaunae Miller (BAH); 50.45	-	Faith Kipyegon (KEN); 3:56.82 WL, MR, NR	-	-	-	Hyvin Jepkemoi (KEN); 9:07.42 WL, MR
3	Rabat	Elaine Thompson (JAM); 11.02 MR	-	-	Caster Semenya (RSA); 1:56.64 WL, MR	-	Almaz Ayana (ETH); 14:16.31 WL, MR	-	Janieve Russell (JAM); 54.16 PB	Etenesh Diro (ETH); 9:16.87 SB
4	Eugene	English Gardner (USA); 10.81 SB	Tori Bowie (USA); 21.99 WL	Shaunae Miller (BAH); 50.15	-	Faith Kipyegon (KEN); 3:56.41 WL, MR, NR	Hellen Obiri (KEN); 14:32.02 PB	Kendra Harrison (USA); 12.24 AR, WL, DLR, MR	-	Ruth Jebet (BHR); 8:59.97 AR, WL, DLR, MR
5	Rome	Elaine Thompson (JAM); 10.87 SB	-	-	Caster Semenya (RSA); 1:56.64 =WL	-	Almaz Ayana (ETH); 14:12.59 WL, DLR, MR	-	Janieve Russell (JAM); 53.96 WL	-
6	Birmingham	English Gardner (USA); 11.02	-	Floria Gueï (FRA); 50.84 PB	Francine Niyonsaba (BDI); 1:56.92 MR	Sarah McDonald (GBR); 4:07.18 PB	Vivian Cheruiyot (KEN); 15:12.79	Kendra Harrison (USA); 12.46 MR	Cassandra Tate (USA); 54.57 SB	-
7	Oslo	-	Dafne Schippers (NED); 21.93 WL, DLR, MR	Stephenie Ann McPherson (JAM); 51.04	-	Faith Kipyegon (KEN); 4:18.60 WL	-	Brianna Rollins (USA); 12.56	-	Hyvin Jepkemoi (KEN); 9:09.57
8	Stockholm	-	Dina Asher-Smith (GBR); 22.72 SB	Novlene Williams-Mills (JAM); 52.29	-	Angelika Cichocka (POL); 4:03.25 SB	-	Kendra Harrison (USA); 12.66	-	Ruth Jebet (BHR); 9:08.37 MR
9	Monaco	Dafne Schippers (NED); 10.94	-	-	Caster Semenya (RSA); 1:55.30 WL, DLR, MR, NR	-	Hellen Obiri (KEN); 8:24:27 (3000 m)	-	Eilidh Doyle (GBR); 54.09 SB	-
10	London	Marie-Josée Ta Lou (CIV); 10.96 =PB	Dafne Schippers (NED); 22.13	Shaunae Miller (BAH); 49.55 WL	Shelayna Oskan-Clarke (GBR); 1:59.46 SB	Laura Muir (GBR); 3:57.49 MR, NR	-	Kendra Harrison (USA); 12.20 WR	Dalilah Muhammad (USA); 53.90	Habiba Ghribi (TUN); 9:21.35 SB
11	Lausanne	Elaine Thompson (JAM); 10.78	-	-	Francine Niyonsaba (BDI); 1:57.71	-	Genzebe Dibaba (ETH); 8:31.34 (3000 m)	Kendra Harrison (USA); 12.42	Dalilah Muhammad (USA); 53.78	-
12	Paris	-	Dafne Schippers (NED); 22.13	Natasha Hastings (USA); 50.06	-	Laura Muir (GBR); 3:55.22 WL MR, NR	-	Kendra Harrison (USA); 12.44	-	Ruth Jebet (BHR); 8:52.78 WR
13	Zurich	Christania Williams (JAM); 11.04	Elaine Thompson (JAM); 21.85 DLR	-	Caster Semenya (RSA); 1:56.44	Shannon Rowbury (USA); 3:57.78	-	Kendra Harrison (USA); 12.63	Shamier Little (USA); 53.97	Ruth Jebet (BHR); 9:07.00 MR
14	Brussels	Elaine Thompson (JAM); 10.72 MR	–	Caster Semenya (RSA); 50.40 PB	-	–	Almaz Ayana (ETH); 14:18.89 MR	Jasmin Stowers (USA); 12.78	Cassandra Tate (USA); 54.47 SB	–
Overall winner		Elaine Thompson (JAM)	Dafne Schippers (NED)	Stephenie Ann McPherson (JAM)	Caster Semenya (RSA)	Laura Muir (GBR)	Almaz Ayana (ETH)	Kendra Harrison (USA)	Cassandra Tate (USA)	Ruth Jebet (BHR)

==== Field ====
#	Meeting	Long jump	Triple jump	High jump	Pole vault	Shot put	Discus	Javelin
1	Doha	-	Caterine Ibargüen (COL); 15.04 WL, MR	-	Sandi Morris (USA); 4.83 WL, =DLR, MR	Tia Brooks (USA); 19.48 PB	-	Sunette Viljoen (RSA); 65.14 SB
2	Shanghai	Ivana Španović (SRB); 6.95 MR	-	Levern Spencer (LCA); 1.94	-	-	Sandra Perković (CRO); 70.88 WL, DLR, MR	-
3	Rabat	-	Caterine Ibargüen (COL); 14.51	-	Katerina Stefanidi (GRE); 4.75 MR	Valerie Adams (NZL); 19.68 SB	-	Madara Palameika (LAT); 64.76 MR
4	Eugene	Brittney Reese (USA); 6.92 SB	-	Chaunté Lowe (USA); 1.95	-	-	Sandra Perković (CRO); 68.57	-
5	Rome	-	Caterine Ibargüen (COL); 14.78	-	Katerina Stefanidi (GRE); 4.75 =PB	Valerie Adams (NZL); 19.69 SB	-	Sunette Viljoen (RSA); 61.95
6	Birmingham	-	Olga Rypakova (KAZ); 14.61 =SB	-	Yarisley Silva (CUB); 4.84 WL, DLR	Tia Brooks (USA); 19.73 PB	-	Madara Palameika (LAT); 65.68 SB
7	Oslo	Ivana Španović (SRB); 6.94	-	Ruth Beitia (ESP); 1.90	-	-	Sandra Perković (CRO); 67.10	-
8	Stockholm	Ivana Španović (SRB); 6.90	-	Ruth Beitia (ESP); 1.93 SB	-	-	Sandra Perković (CRO); 68.32	-
9	Monaco	-	Caterine Ibargüen (COL); 14.96	-	Katerina Stefanidi (GRE); 4.81	Valerie Adams (NZL); 20.05 SB	-	Tatsiana Khaladovich (BLR); 65.62
10	London	Katarina Johnson-Thompson (GBR); 6.84 SB	-	Ruth Beitia (ESP); 1.98 =SB	Katerina Stefanidi (GRE); 4.80	-	Sandra Perković (CRO); 69.94 MR	-
11	Lausanne	Ivana Španović (SRB); 6.83	Caterine Ibargüen (COL); 14.76	-	-	Valerie Adams (NZL); 19.94		Madara Palameika (LAT); 65.29
12	Paris	Ivana Španović (SRB); 6.90	-	Ruth Beitia (ESP); 1.98 =SB	-	-	Sandra Perković (CRO); 67.62	-
13	Zurich	Brittney Reese (USA); 6.95	-	Ruth Beitia (ESP); 1.96	Holly Bradshaw (GBR); 4.76	-	Sandra Perković (CRO); 68.44	-
14	Brussels	-	Caterine Ibargüen (COL); 14.66	Nafissatou Thiam (BEL); 1.93	Sandi Morris (USA) 5.00 WL, DLR, MR	Michelle Carter (USA); 19.98	-	Madara Palameika (LAT); 66.18 NR
Overall winner		Ivana Španović (SRB)	Caterine Ibargüen (COL)	Ruth Beitia (ESP)	Katerina Stefanidi (GRE)	Valerie Adams (NZL)	Sandra Perković (CRO)	Madara Palameika (LAT)

== Results ==
Doha
Event	1st +10 pts	2nd +6 pts	3rd +4 pts	4th +3 pts	5th +2 pts	6th +1 pts	7th ⠀	8th ⠀
Men's 200m (+1.9 m/s)	Ameer Webb; USA | 19.85	Alonso Edward; PAN | 20.06	Femi Ogunode; QAT | 20.10	Walter Dix; USA | 20.14	Churandy Martina; NED | 20.24	Isiah Young; USA | 20.29	Nickel Ashmeade; JAM | 20.31	Lykourgos-Stefanos Tsakonas; GRE | 20.66
Men's 400m	LaShawn Merritt; USA | 44.41	Machel Cedenio; TTO | 44.68	Abdalelah Haroun; QAT | 44.81	David Verburg; USA | 45.54	Tony McQuay; USA | 45.65	Isaac Makwala; BOT | 45.71	Steven Gardiner; BAH | 46.39	Luguelín Santos; DOM | 46.53
Men's 1500m	Asbel Kiprop; KEN | 3:32.15	Elijah Motonei Manangoi; KEN | 3:33.67	Silas Kiplagat; KEN | 3:33.86	Bethwell Birgen; KEN | 3:33.94	Abdi Waiss; DJI | 3:34.55	Aman Wote; ETH | 3:34.58	Robert Biwott; KEN | 3:34.68	Vincent Kibet; KEN | 3:34.81
Men's 110mH (+1.4 m/s)	Omar McLeod; JAM | 13.05	Hansle Parchment; JAM | 13.10	Orlando Ortega; ESP | 13.12	David Oliver; USA | 13.16	Dimitri Bascou; FRA | 13.33	Aries Merritt; USA | 13.37	Spencer Adams; USA | 13.44	Antonio Alkana; RSA | 13.50
Men's 3000mSC	Conseslus Kipruto; KEN | 8:05.13	Jairus Kipchoge Birech; KEN | 8:08.28	Abraham Kibiwot; KEN | 8:09.25	John Kibet Koech; BRN | 8:09.62	Barnabas Kipyego; KEN | 8:10.11	Clement Kimutai Kemboi; KEN | 8:10.65	Paul Kipsiele Koech; KEN | 8:15.69	Abel Kiprop Mutai; KEN | 8:16.84
Men's High Jump	Erik Kynard; USA | 2.33 m	Zhang Guowei; CHN | 2.31 m	Marco Fassinotti; ITA | 2.29 m	Robbie Grabarz; GBR | 2.29 m	Derek Drouin; CAN | 2.29 m	Donald Thomas; BAH | 2.29 m	Mutaz Essa Barshim; QAT | 2.26 m	Jesse Williams; USA | 2.19 m
Men's Triple Jump	Christian Taylor; USA | 17.23 m	Bin Dong; CHN | 17.07 m	Alexis Copello; AZE | 16.98 m	Roman Valiyev; KAZ | 16.77 m	Tosin Oke; NGR | 16.73 m	Samyr Laine; HAI | 16.64 m	Teddy Tamgho; FRA | 16.54 m	Nathan Douglas; GBR | 16.43 m
Men's Discus Throw	Piotr Małachowski; POL | 68.03 m	Philip Milanov; BEL | 67.26 m	Victor Hogan; RSA | DQ (Note: Disqualified after competition due to antidoping rule violation)	Robert Urbanek; POL | 65.13 m	Daniel Ståhl; SWE | 64.06 m	Axel Härstedt; SWE | 62.54 m	Zoltán Kővágó; HUN | 61.67 m	Benn Harradine; AUS | 61.04 m
Women's 100m (+0.7 m/s)	Tori Bowie; USA | 10.80	Dafne Schippers; NED | 10.83	Veronica Campbell-Brown; JAM | 10.91	Murielle Ahouré-Demps; CIV | 11.02	Marie-Josée Ta Lou; CIV | 11.05	Simone Facey; JAM | 11.05	Mikele Barber; USA | 11.30	Jeneba Tarmoh; USA | 11.41
Women's 800m	Caster Semenya; RSA | 1:58.26	Habitam Alemu; ETH | 1:59.14	Eunice Jepkoech Sum; KEN | 1:59.74	Malika Akkaoui; MAR | 1:59.93	Shelayna Oskan-Clarke; GBR | 2:01.04	Chanelle Price; USA | 2:01.05	Winny Chebet; KEN | 2:02.27	Adelle Tracey; GBR | 2:02.30
Women's 3000m	Almaz Ayana; ETH | 8:23.11	Mercy Cherono; KEN | 8:26.36	Gelete Burka; ETH | 8:28.49	Vivian Jepkemei Cheruiyot; KEN | 8:31.86	Janet Kisa; KEN | 8:32.13	Viola Jelagat Kibiwot; KEN | 8:34.50	Etenesh Diro; ETH | 8:38.32	Selah Busienei; KEN | 8:42.01
Women's 400mH	Eilidh Doyle; GBR | 54.53	Kemi Adekoya; BRN | 54.87	Kaliese Carter; JAM | 55.02	Wenda Nel; RSA | 55.17	Cassandra Tate; USA | 55.57	Meghan Beesley; GBR | 55.72	Tiffany Williams; USA | 56.57	Jernail Hayes; USA | 1:00.48
Women's Pole Vault	Sandi Morris; USA | 4.83 m	Nicole Büchler; SUI | 4.78 m	Aikaterini Stefanidi; GRE | 4.73 m	Li Ling; CHN | 4.63 m	Nikoleta Kyriakopoulou; GRE | 4.53 m	Katie Moon; USA | 4.53 m	Mary Saxer; USA | 4.43 m	Martina Strutz; GER | 4.43 m
Women's Triple Jump	Caterine Ibarguen; COL | 15.04 m	Yulimar Rojas; VEN | 14.92 m	Olga Rypakova; KAZ | 14.61 m	Jeanine Assani Issouf; FRA | 14.26 m	Paraskevi Papachristou; GRE | 14.26 m	Shanieka Ricketts; JAM | 14.10 m	Dana Velďáková; SVK | 14.06 m	Keila Costa; BRA | 13.69 m
Women's Shot Put	Tia Brooks-Wannemacher; USA | 19.48 m	Anita Márton; HUN | 19.22 m	Emel Dereli̇ TUR | 18.57 m	Aliona Dubitskaya; BLR | 18.29 m	Michelle Carter; USA | 17.83 m	Paulina Guba; POL | 17.73 m	Taryn Suttie; CAN | 17.63 m	Felisha Johnson; USA | 17.37 m
Women's Javelin Throw	Sunette Viljoen; RSA | 65.14 m	Kathryn Mitchell; AUS | 63.25 m	Huihui Lyu; CHN | 62.42 m	Katharina Molitor; GER | 62.12 m	Brittany Borman; USA | 61.27 m	Martina Ratej; SLO | 60.32 m	Madara Palameika; LAT | 59.73 m	Sanni Utriainen; FIN | 56.02 m

Shanghai
Event	1st +10 pts	2nd +6 pts	3rd +4 pts	4th +3 pts	5th +2 pts	6th +1 pts	7th ⠀	8th ⠀
Men's 100m (0.0 m/s)	Justin Gatlin; USA | 9.94	Femi Ogunode; QAT | 10.07	Michael Rodgers; USA | 10.10	Kim Collins; SKN | 10.17	Isiah Young; USA | 10.22	Julian Forte; JAM | 10.23	Ramon Gittens; BAR | 10.24	Zhenye Xie; CHN | 10.31
Men's 800m	Ferguson Cheruiyot Rotich; KEN | 1:45.68	Robert Biwott; KEN | 1:45.84	Alfred Kipketer; KEN | 1:45.93	Thijmen Kupers; NED | 1:46.23	David Rudisha; KEN | 1:46.24	Antoine Gakeme; BDI | 1:46.35	Rynhardt van Rensburg; RSA | 1:46.69	Erik Sowinski; USA | 1:47.22
Men's 5000m	Muktar Edris; ETH | 12:59.96	Joshua Cheptegei; UGA | 13:00.60	Thomas Pkemei Longosiwa; KEN | 13:01.69	Abadi Hadis; ETH | 13:02.49	Yomif Kejelcha; ETH | 13:03.29	Hagos Gebrhiwet; ETH | 13:04.12	Albert Rop; BRN | 13:04.87	Imane Merga; ETH | 13:06.25
Men's 110mH (+1.2 m/s)	Omar McLeod; JAM | 12.98	Hansle Parchment; JAM | 13.12	Wenjun Xie; CHN | 13.34	Dimitri Bascou; FRA | 13.34	David Oliver; USA | 13.38	Jason Richardson; USA | 13.44	Honglin Zhang; CHN | 13.79	Aries Merritt; USA | DQ
Men's 400mH	Michael Tinsley; USA | 48.90	Patryk Dobek; POL | 49.01	Jeffery Gibson; BAH | 49.11	LJ van Zyl; RSA | 49.13	Yasmani Copello; TUR | 49.14	Nicholas Bett; KEN | 49.31	Kerron Clement; USA | 49.56	Javier Culson; PUR | 49.58
Men's Pole Vault	Sam Kendricks; USA | 5.88 m	Renaud Lavillenie; FRA | 5.83 m	Shawnacy Barber; CAN | 5.70 m	Stanley Joseph; FRA | 5.70 m	Piotr Lisek; POL | 5.62 m	Jie Yao; CHN | 5.62 m	Konstantinos Filippidis; GRE | 5.52 m	Changrui Xue; CHN | 5.40 m
Men's Long Jump	Xinglong Gao; CHN | 8.14 m	Ruswahl Samaai; RSA | 8.14 m	Fabrice Lapierre; AUS | 8.09 m	Jeff Henderson; USA | 8.02 m	Wang Jianan; CHN | 7.96 m	Yaoguang Zhang; CHN | 7.87 m	Changzhou Huang; CHN | 7.84 m	Dan Bramble; GBR | 7.75 m
Men's Shot Put	Kurt Roberts; USA | 21.40 m	Tom Walsh; NZL | 21.20 m	Joe Kovacs; USA | 20.82 m	Tomasz Majewski; POL | 20.76 m	Tim Nedow; CAN | 20.40 m	Jordan Clarke; USA | 20.30 m	Franck Elemba; CGO | 19.47 m	Ryan Whiting; USA | 19.34 m
Men's Javelin Throw	Thomas Röhler; GER | 85.71 m	Jakub Vadlejch; CZE | 84.77 m	Vítězslav Veselý; CZE | 83.81 m	Ihab Abdelrahman; EGY | DQ	Hamish Peacock; AUS | 82.28 m	Ryohei Arai; JPN | 80.07 m	Marcin Krukowski; POL | 76.81 m	Qinggang Zhao; CHN | 75.92 m
Women's 200m (+0.7 m/s)	Murielle Ahouré-Demps; CIV | 22.72	Veronica Campbell-Brown; JAM | 22.82	Anneisha McLaughlin-Whilby; JAM | 22.94	Ivet Lalova-Collio; BUL | 23.04	Yongli Wei; CHN | 23.29	Kaylin Whitney; USA | 23.39	Tiffany Townsend; USA | 23.42	Candyce McGrone; USA | 23.50
Women's 400m	Shaunae Miller-Uibo; BAH | 50.45	Stephenie Ann McPherson; JAM | 50.98	Natasha Hastings; USA | 51.10	Novlene Williams-Mills; JAM | 51.96	Ashley Spencer; USA | 52.46	Shericka Jackson; JAM | 53.02	Bianca Denisa Răzor; ROU | 53.09	Chunyu Wang; CHN | 54.30
Women's 1500m	Faith Kipyegon; KEN | 3:56.82	Hellen Obiri; KEN | 3:59.34	Dawit Seyaum; ETH | 3:59.87	Besu Sado; ETH | 4:00.08	Gudaf Tsegay; ETH | 4:02.73	Jenny Simpson; USA | 4:04.56	Sofia Ennaoui; POL | 4:05.10	Nancy Chepkwemoi; KEN | 4:05.22
Women's 3000mSC	Hyvin Kiyeng; KEN | 9:07.42	Ruth Jebet; BRN | 9:15.98	Sofia Assefa; ETH | 9:21.07	Virginia Nyambura; KEN | 9:21.15	Purity Kirui; KEN | 9:22.47	Lydia Chebet Rotich; KEN | 9:23.49	Celliphine Chepteek Chespol; KEN | 9:24.73	Sudha Singh; IND | 9:26.55
Women's High Jump	Levern Spencer; LCA | 1.94 m	Nadiya Dusanova; UZB | 1.94 m	Ana Šimić; CRO | 1.92 m	Svetlana Radzivil; UZB | 1.88 m	Mirela Demireva; BUL | 1.88 m	Yuliya Chumachenko; UKR | 1.85 m	Priscilla Frederick; ANT | 1.85 m	Jeanelle Scheper; LCA | 1.85 m
Women's Long Jump	Ivana Vuleta; SRB | 6.95 m	Christabel Nettey; CAN | 6.75 m	Tianna Madison; USA | 6.75 m	Sosthene Moguenara-Taroum; GER | 6.74 m	Lorraine Ugen; GBR | 6.55 m	Janay Deloach; USA | 6.48 m	Funmi Jimoh; USA | 6.43 m	Xiaoling Xu; CHN | 6.36 m
Women's Discus Throw	Sandra Perković; CRO | 70.88 m	Dani Stevens; AUS | 67.77 m	Denia Caballero; CUB | 66.14 m	Xinyue Su; CHN | 64.45 m	Yaimé Pérez; CUB | 62.77 m	Whitney Ashley; USA | 59.56 m	Yarelis Barrios; CUB | 58.63 m	Jade Lally; GBR | 58.51 m

Rabat
Event	1st +10 pts	2nd +6 pts	3rd +4 pts	4th +3 pts	5th +2 pts	6th +1 pts	7th ⠀	8th ⠀
Men's 200m (+3.8 m/s)	Alonso Edward; PAN | 20.07	Wilfried Koffi Hua; CIV | 20.35	Bruno Hortelano-Roig; ESP | 20.36	José Carlos Herrera; MEX | 20.55	Abdullah Abkar Mohammed; KSA | 20.93	Aziz Ouhadi; MAR | 20.96	Gavin Smellie; CAN | 20.97	Adrian Griffith; BAH | 21.32
Men's 400m	LaShawn Merritt; USA | 44.66	Kévin Borlée; BEL | 45.26	Isaac Makwala; BOT | 45.38	Christopher Brown; BAH | 45.75	Nery Brenes; CRC | 45.78	Rabah Yousif; GBR | 45.90	Rusheen McDonald; JAM | 46.79	Jonathan Borlée; BEL | 46.81
Men's 800m	Pierre-Ambroise Bosse; FRA | 1:44.51	Taoufik Makhloufi; ALG | 1:44.91	Amel Tuka; BIH | 1:45.41	Marcin Lewandowski; POL | 1:45.76	Abdelati el Guesse; MAR | 1:46.80	Nijel Amos; BOT | 1:47.34	Amine el Manaoui; MAR | 1:48.83	Jamal Hairane; QAT | 1:50.58
Men's 110mH (+1.4 m/s)	David Oliver; USA | 13.12	Orlando Ortega; ESP | 13.13	Antonio Alkana; RSA | 13.28	Konstantinos Douvalidis; GRE | 13.38	Johnathan Cabral; CAN | 13.42	Jason Richardson; USA | 13.54	João Vitor de Oliveira; BRA | 13.90	Yidiel Contreras; ESP | DNF
Men's 3000mSC	Conseslus Kipruto; KEN | 8:02.77	Jairus Kipchoge Birech; KEN | 8:03.90	Paul Kipsiele Koech; KEN | 8:12.33	Lawrence Kemboi Kipsang; KEN | 8:17.82	Yoann Kowal; FRA | 8:18.48	Hamid Ezzine; MAR | 8:19.31	Tafese Soboka; ETH | 8:20.41	Clement Kimutai Kemboi; KEN | 8:21.46
Men's High Jump	Bohdan Bondarenko; UKR | 2.31 m	Erik Kynard; USA | 2.28 m	Edgar Rivera; MEX | 2.25 m	Konstantinos Baniotis; GRE | 2.25 m	Robbie Grabarz; GBR | 2.25 m	Gianmarco Tamberi; ITA | 2.25 m	Marco Fassinotti; ITA | 2.20 m	Jaroslav Bába; CZE | 2.20 m
Men's Long Jump	Ruswahl Samaai; RSA | 8.38 m	Fabrice Lapierre; AUS | 8.36 m	Marquise Goodwin; USA | 8.11 m	Dan Bramble; GBR | 8.00 m	Emiliano Lasa; URU | 7.95 m	Tyrone Smith; BER | 7.90 m	Mauro Vinicius da Silva; BRA | 7.87 m	Mouhcine Khoua; MAR | 7.80 m
Men's Discus Throw	Piotr Małachowski; POL | 67.45 m	Robert Urbanek; POL | 65.04 m	Zoltán Kővágó; HUN | 64.42 m	Philip Milanov; BEL | 63.74 m	Apostolos Parellis; CYP | 63.46 m	Martin Kupper; EST | 63.13 m	Daniel Ståhl; SWE | 61.09 m	Gerd Kanter; EST | 60.70 m
Women's 100m (-1.3 m/s)	Elaine Thompson-Herah; JAM | 11.02	Blessing Okagbare; NGR | 11.11	Kerron Stewart; JAM | 11.19	Carina Horn; RSA | 11.28	Carmelita Jeter; USA | 11.32	Alexandria Anderson; USA | 11.45	Mujinga Kambundji; SUI | 11.45	Ezinne Okparaebo; NOR | 11.46
Women's 800m	Caster Semenya; RSA | 1:56.64	Francine Niyonsaba; BDI | 1:57.74	Rénelle Lamote; FRA | 1:58.84	Eunice Jepkoech Sum; KEN | 1:59.32	Lynsey Sharp; GBR | 1:59.51	Habitam Alemu; ETH | 1:59.70	Malika Akkaoui; MAR | 2:01.11	Marina Arzamasova; BLR | 2:01.49
Women's 5000m	Almaz Ayana; ETH | 14:16.31	Viola Jelagat Kibiwot; KEN | 14:29.50	Senbere Teferi; ETH | 14:35.09	Janet Kisa; KEN | 14:38.70	Ababel Yeshaneh; ETH | 14:41.58	Alemitu Haroye; ETH | 14:43.58	Meraf Bahta; SWE | 14:49.95	Sentayehu Lewetegn; ETH | 15:06.49
Women's 400mH	Janieve Russell; JAM | 54.16	Cassandra Tate; USA | 54.69	Wenda Nel; RSA | 54.88	Hanna Titimets; UKR | 55.10	Kemi Adekoya; BRN | 55.33	Emilia Ankiewicz; POL | 57.25	Hayat Lambarki; MAR | DNS	
Women's Pole Vault	Aikaterini Stefanidi; GRE | 4.75 m	Nicole Büchler; SUI | 4.70 m	Yarisley Silva; CUB | 4.50 m	Nikoleta Kyriakopoulou; GRE | 4.50 m	Lisa Ryzih; GER | 4.50 m	Regine Bakenecker; GER | 4.30 m		
Women's Triple Jump	Caterine Ibarguen; COL | 14.51 m	Paraskevi Papachristou; GRE | 14.28 m	Patrícia Mamona; POR | 14.13 m	Yulimar Rojas; VEN | 14.11 m	Susana Costa; POR | 13.90 m	Tetyana Ptashkina; UKR | 13.33 m	Joelle Mbumi; CMR | 13.24 m	Susana Costa; POR | 13.72 m
Women's Shot Put	Valerie Adams; NZL | 19.68 m	Anita Márton; HUN | 18.51 m	Brittany Smith; USA | 17.84 m	Paulina Guba; POL | 17.74 m	Alena Abramchuk; BLR | 17.53 m	Natalia Ducó; CHI | 17.21 m	Auriol Dongmo; CMR | 16.81 m	
Women's Javelin Throw	Madara Palameika; LAT | 64.76 m	Liina Laasma; EST | 63.65 m	Kathryn Mitchell; AUS | 60.68 m	Līna Mūze-Sirmā; LAT | 59.54 m	Martina Ratej; SLO | 59.39 m	Ásdís Hjálmsdóttir; ISL | 57.02 m	Hanna Hatsko; UKR | 55.72 m	Tatjana Mirković; SRB | 46.61 m

Eugene
Event	1st +10 pts	2nd +6 pts	3rd +4 pts	4th +3 pts	5th +2 pts	6th +1 pts	7th ⠀	8th ⠀
Men's 100m (+2.6 m/s)	Justin Gatlin; USA | 9.88	Asafa Powell; JAM | 9.94	Tyson Gay; USA | 9.98	Michael Rodgers; USA | 9.99	Femi Ogunode; QAT | 10.02	Ameer Webb; USA | 10.03	Bingtian Su; CHN | 10.04	Andre de Grasse; CAN | 10.05
Men's 800m	Boris Berian; USA | 1:44.20	Ferguson Cheruiyot Rotich; KEN | 1:44.56	Mohammed Aman; ETH | 1:44.70	Adam Kszczot; POL | 1:44.99	Timothy Kitum; KEN | 1:45.30	Amel Tuka; BIH | 1:45.90	Wesley Vázquez; PUR | 1:46.04	Andrew Wheating; USA | 1:48.09
Men's 5000m	Muktar Edris; ETH | 12:59.43	Geoffrey Kamworor; KEN | 12:59.98	Mohammed Ahmed; CAN | 13:01.74	Thomas Pkemei Longosiwa; KEN | 13:02.91	Edwin Cheruiyot Soi; KEN | 13:03.26	Hassan Mead; USA | 13:04.17	Yenew Alamirew; ETH | 13:04.29	Joshua Cheptegei; UGA | 13:07.53
Men's 400mH	Michael Tinsley; USA | 48.74	Kerron Clement; USA | 48.87	Bershawn Jackson; USA | 49.04	Jeffery Gibson; BAH | 49.16	Yasmani Copello; TUR | 49.43	Kariem Hussein; SUI | 49.47	Javier Culson; PUR | 49.51	Nicholas Bett; KEN | 51.33
Men's Pole Vault	Renaud Lavillenie; FRA | 5.81 m	Shawnacy Barber; CAN | 5.81 m	Sam Kendricks; USA | 5.71 m	Paweł Wojciechowski; POL | 5.71 m	Konstantinos Filippidis; GRE | 5.61 m	Piotr Lisek; POL | 5.48 m	Changrui Xue; CHN | 5.48 m	
Men's Triple Jump	Christian Taylor; USA | 17.76 m	Will Claye; USA | 17.56 m	Omar Craddock; USA | 17.15 m	Alexis Copello; AZE | 16.91 m	Bin Dong; CHN | 16.82 m	Teddy Tamgho; FRA | 16.51 m	Marquis Dendy; USA | NM	
Men's Shot Put	Joe Kovacs; USA | 22.13 m	Tom Walsh; NZL | 20.84 m	Reese Hoffa; USA | 20.58 m	Tomasz Majewski; POL | 20.43 m	Jordan Clarke; USA | 20.31 m	Ryan Crouser; USA | 20.27 m	Tim Nedow; CAN | 20.20 m	Kurt Roberts; USA | 20.13 m
Men's Javelin Throw	Ihab Abdelrahman; EGY | DQ	Julius Yego; KEN | 84.68 m	Thomas Röhler; GER | 82.53 m	Jakub Vadlejch; CZE | 80.94 m	Cyrus Hostetler; USA | 78.21 m	Johannes Vetter; GER | 78.04 m	Keshorn Walcott; TTO | 74.99 m	Marcin Krukowski; POL | NM
Women's 200m (+1.9 m/s)	Tori Bowie; USA | 21.99	Dafne Schippers; NED | 22.11	Elaine Thompson-Herah; JAM | 22.16	Jenna Prandini; USA | 22.61	Joanna Atkins; USA | 22.62	Kaylin Whitney; USA | 23.17	Kimberlyn Duncan; USA | 23.20	Candyce McGrone; USA | 23.44
Women's 400m	Shaunae Miller-Uibo; BAH | 50.15	Francena McCorory; USA | 50.23	Natasha Hastings; USA | 50.86	Stephenie Ann McPherson; JAM | 51.07	Shericka Jackson; JAM | 51.34	Quanera Hayes; USA | 51.82	Sanya Richards-Ross; USA | 52.16	Ashley Spencer; USA | DNF
Women's 1500m	Faith Kipyegon; KEN | 3:56.41	Dawit Seyaum; ETH | 3:58.10	Gudaf Tsegay; ETH | 4:00.18	Jenny Simpson; USA | 4:01.57	Linden Hall; AUS | 4:01.78	Laura Weightman; GBR | 4:03.04	Shelby Houlihan; USA | 4:03.39	Brenda Martinez; USA | 4:03.57
Women's 100mH (+0.7 m/s)	Kendra Harrison; USA | 12.24	Brianna McNeal; USA | 12.53	Jasmin Stowers; USA | 12.55	Nia Ali; USA | 12.72	Sharika Nelvis; USA | 12.82	Alina Talay; BLR | 12.85	Tiffany Porter; GBR | 12.90	Dawn Harper-Nelson; USA | 13.01
Women's 3000mSC	Ruth Jebet; BRN | 8:59.97	Hyvin Kiyeng; KEN | 9:00.01	Emma Coburn; USA | 9:10.76	Beatrice Chepkoech; KEN | 9:17.41	Sofia Assefa; ETH | 9:18.16	Leah Falland; USA | 9:18.85	Gesa Felicitas Krause; GER | 9:22.33	Lidya Chepkurui; KEN | 9:22.81
Women's High Jump	Chaunte Lowe; USA | 1.95 m	Levern Spencer; LCA | 1.92 m	Alessia Trost; ITA | 1.92 m	Kamila Lićwinko; POL | 1.92 m	Vashti Cunningham; USA | 1.92 m	Ruth Beitia; ESP | 1.92 m	Marie-Laurence Jungfleisch; GER | 1.88 m	Isobel Pooley; GBR | 1.88 m
Women's Long Jump	Brittney Reese; USA | 6.92 m	Ivana Vuleta; SRB | 6.88 m	Lorraine Ugen; GBR | 6.76 m	Blessing Okagbare; NGR | 6.73 m	Christabel Nettey; CAN | 6.68 m	Janay Deloach; USA | 6.59 m	Tianna Madison; USA | 6.48 m	Shara Proctor; GBR | 6.39 m
Women's Discus Throw	Sandra Perković; CRO | 68.57 m	Nadine Müller; GER | 65.31 m	Melina Robert-Michon; FRA | 63.69 m	Shanice Craft; GER | 63.28 m	Whitney Ashley; USA | 62.03 m	Julia Harting; GER | 61.91 m	Jade Lally; GBR | 61.83 m	Gia Lewis-Smallwood; USA | 57.15 m

Rome
Event	1st +10 pts	2nd +6 pts	3rd +4 pts	4th +3 pts	5th +2 pts	6th +1 pts	7th ⠀	8th ⠀
Men's 200m (+0.6 m/s)	Ameer Webb; USA | 20.04	Aaron Brown; CAN | 20.24	Alonso Edward; PAN | 20.25	Christophe Lemaitre; FRA | 20.27	Ramil Guliyev; TUR | 20.42	Roberto Skyers; CUB | 20.54	Trayvon Bromell; USA | 20.80	Eseosa Fostine Desalu; ITA | 20.86
Men's 400m	Wayde van Niekerk; RSA | 44.19	Bralon Taplin; GRN | 44.43	Isaac Makwala; BOT | 44.85	Abdalelah Haroun; QAT | 45.05	Vernon Norwood; USA | 45.17	Kévin Borlée; BEL | 45.35	Deon Lendore; TTO | 45.51	Rusheen McDonald; JAM | 46.05
Men's 1500m	Elijah Motonei Manangoi; KEN | 3:33.96	Robert Biwott; KEN | 3:34.21	Ryan Gregson; AUS | 3:34.27	Silas Kiplagat; KEN | 3:34.49	Aman Wote; ETH | 3:35.10	Bethwell Birgen; KEN | 3:35.36	Chris O'Hare; GBR | 3:35.37	Florian Carvalho de Fonsesco; FRA | 3:35.39
Men's 110mH (+0.6 m/s)	Orlando Ortega; ESP | 13.22	Pascal Martinot-Lagarde; FRA | 13.29	Andrew Pozzi; GBR | 13.37	Shane Brathwaite; BAR | 13.64	Wilhem Belocian; FRA | 13.73	Emanuele Abate; ITA | 13.83	Lorenzo Perini; ITA | 13.90	Dimitri Bascou; FRA | DNF
Men's 3000mSC	Conseslus Kipruto; KEN | 8:01.41	Jairus Kipchoge Birech; KEN | 8:11.39	Paul Kipsiele Koech; KEN | 8:14.46	Yoann Kowal; FRA | 8:17.83	Stanley Kipkoech Kebenei; USA | 8:18.52	Hilal Yego; KEN | 8:19.01	Krystian Zalewski; POL | 8:19.91	Bilal Tabti; ALG | 8:20.26
Men's High Jump	Bohdan Bondarenko; UKR | 2.33 m	Robbie Grabarz; GBR | 2.30 m	Gianmarco Tamberi; ITA | 2.30 m	Zhang Guowei; CHN | 2.30 m	Marco Fassinotti; ITA | 2.27 m	Mutaz Essa Barshim; QAT | 2.27 m	Konstantinos Baniotis; GRE | 2.24 m	Chris Baker; GBR | 2.24 m
Men's Long Jump	Greg Rutherford; GBR | 8.31 m	Marquise Goodwin; USA | 8.19 m	Fabrice Lapierre; AUS | 8.18 m	Ruswahl Samaai; RSA | 8.16 m	Michael Hartfield; USA | 8.11 m	Wang Jianan; CHN | 8.08 m	Luvo Manyonga; RSA | 8.03 m	Radek Juška; CZE | 7.77 m
Men's Discus Throw	Robert Urbanek; POL | 65.00 m	Victor Hogan; RSA | DQ	Robert Harting; GER | 63.96 m	Fedrick Dacres; JAM | 63.50 m	Daniel Ståhl; SWE | 63.25 m	Piotr Małachowski; POL | 63.23 m	Benn Harradine; AUS | 61.64 m	Martin Kupper; EST | 61.10 m
Women's 100m (+0.8 m/s)	Elaine Thompson-Herah; JAM | 10.87	English Gardner; USA | 10.92	Barbara Pierre; USA | 11.13	Ivet Lalova-Collio; BUL | 11.15	Desiree Henry; GBR | 11.15	Michelle-Lee Ahye; TTO | 11.23	Ewa Swoboda; POL | 11.28	Mujinga Kambundji; SUI | 11.36
Women's 800m	Caster Semenya; RSA | 1:56.64	Francine Niyonsaba; BDI | 1:58.20	Lynsey Sharp; GBR | 1:59.03	Rénelle Lamote; FRA | 1:59.23	Marina Arzamasova; BLR | 1:59.65	Habitam Alemu; ETH | 1:59.79	Melissa Bishop-Nriagu; CAN | 1:59.97	Joanna Jóźwik; POL | 2:00.72
Women's 5000m	Almaz Ayana; ETH | 14:12.59	Mercy Cherono; KEN | 14:33.95	Viola Jelagat Kibiwot; KEN | 14:34.39	Senbere Teferi; ETH | 14:37.19	Etenesh Diro; ETH | 14:37.51	Yasemin Can; TUR | 14:37.61	Janet Kisa; KEN | 14:42.61	Dera Dida; ETH | 14:42.84
Women's 400mH	Janieve Russell; JAM | 53.96	Wenda Nel; RSA | 54.61	Eilidh Doyle; GBR | 54.81	Cassandra Tate; USA | 55.35	Kemi Adekoya; BRN | 55.48	Kaliese Carter; JAM | 55.51	Ayomide Folorunso; ITA | 57.24	Georganne Moline; USA | 57.64
Women's Pole Vault	Aikaterini Stefanidi; GRE | 4.75 m	Nikoleta Kyriakopoulou; GRE | 4.75 m	Yarisley Silva; CUB | 4.60 m	Nicole Büchler; SUI | 4.50 m	Katie Moon; USA | 4.50 m	Li Ling; CHN | 4.45 m	Minna Nikkanen; FIN | 4.45 m	Wilma Murto; FIN | 4.35 m
Women's Triple Jump	Caterine Ibarguen; COL | 14.78 m	Olga Rypakova; KAZ | 14.51 m	Shanieka Ricketts; JAM | 14.46 m	Kimberly Williams; JAM | 14.38 m	Liadagmis Povea; CUB | 14.33 m	Olha Saladukha; UKR | 14.18 m	Yulimar Rojas; VEN | 14.09 m	Paraskevi Papachristou; GRE | 14.01 m
Women's Shot Put	Valerie Adams; NZL | 19.69 m	Anita Márton; HUN | 18.98 m	Aliona Dubitskaya; BLR | 18.38 m	Cleopatra Borel; TTO | 18.36 m	Tia Brooks-Wannemacher; USA | 18.24 m	Jillian Camarena-Williams; USA | 18.06 m	Paulina Guba; POL | 17.40 m	Yuliya Leantsiuk; BLR | 17.31 m
Women's Javelin Throw	Sunette Viljoen; RSA | 61.95 m	Madara Palameika; LAT | 61.92 m	Christin Hussong; GER | 61.21 m	Christina Obergföll; GER | 59.98 m	Tatsiana Khaladovich; BLR | 59.86 m	Barbora Špotáková; CZE | 59.82 m	Katharina Molitor; GER | 58.43 m	Līna Mūze-Sirmā; LAT | 57.47 m

Birmingham
Event	1st +10 pts	2nd +6 pts	3rd +4 pts	4th +3 pts	5th +2 pts	6th +1 pts	7th ⠀	8th ⠀
Men's 200m (-1.5 m/s)	Andre de Grasse; CAN | 20.16	Alonso Edward; PAN | 20.17	Sean McLean; USA | 20.24	Churandy Martina; NED | 20.43	Ameer Webb; USA | 20.62	Isiah Young; USA | 20.65	James Ellington; GBR | 20.65	Chijindu Ujah; GBR | 20.70
Men's 400m	Kirani James; GRN | 44.23	Isaac Makwala; BOT | 44.97	Vernon Norwood; USA | 45.08	Matthew Hudson-Smith; GBR | 45.13	Bralon Taplin; GRN | 45.25	Baboloki Thebe; BOT | 45.54	Rabah Yousif; GBR | 45.59	Jarryd Dunn; GBR | 46.30
Men's 1500m	Asbel Kiprop; KEN | 3:29.33	Abdelaati Iguider; MAR | 3:33.10	Nick Willis; NZL | 3:34.29	Vincent Kibet; KEN | 3:34.60	James Kiplagat Magut; KEN | 3:35.18	Ryan Gregson; AUS | 3:35.50	Silas Kiplagat; KEN | 3:35.52	Henrik Ingebrigtsen; NOR | 3:36.00
Men's 3000mSC	Conseslus Kipruto; KEN | 8:00.12	Paul Kipsiele Koech; KEN | 8:10.19	Barnabas Kipyego; KEN | 8:14.74	Brimin Kiprop Kipruto; KEN | 8:19.33	Jairus Kipchoge Birech; KEN | 8:20.31	Clement Kimutai Kemboi; KEN | 8:21.07	Krystian Zalewski; POL | 8:29.00	Taylor Milne; CAN | 8:30.42
Men's High Jump	Mutaz Essa Barshim; QAT | 2.37 m	Erik Kynard; USA | 2.35 m	Zhang Guowei; CHN | 2.32 m	Robbie Grabarz; GBR | 2.29 m	Jaroslav Bába; CZE | 2.26 m	Chris Baker; GBR | 2.26 m	Marco Fassinotti; ITA | 2.26 m	Gianmarco Tamberi; ITA | 2.20 m
Men's Long Jump	Marquise Goodwin; USA | 8.42 m	Michael Hartfield; USA | 8.29 m	Fabrice Lapierre; AUS | 8.21 m	Tyrone Smith; BER | 8.18 m	Greg Rutherford; GBR | 8.17 m	Damar Forbes; JAM | 8.07 m	Christian Taylor; USA | 7.96 m	Mauro Vinicius da Silva; BRA | 7.85 m
Men's Discus Throw	Piotr Małachowski; POL | 67.50 m	Robert Harting; GER | 65.97 m	Robert Urbanek; POL | 64.12 m	Philip Milanov; BEL | 63.75 m	Rodney Brown; USA | 63.50 m	Benn Harradine; AUS | 62.10 m	Daniel Ståhl; SWE | 61.93 m	Zoltán Kővágó; HUN | 61.15 m
Women's 100m (-1.2 m/s)	English Gardner; USA | 11.02	Dafne Schippers; NED | 11.09	Tianna Madison; USA | 11.11	Dina Asher-Smith; GBR | 11.22	Ashleigh Nelson; GBR | 11.24	Simone Facey; JAM | 11.24	Desiree Henry; GBR | 11.32	Michelle-Lee Ahye; TTO | 11.48
Women's 800m	Francine Niyonsaba; BDI | 1:56.92	Rénelle Lamote; FRA | 1:58.01	Melissa Bishop-Nriagu; CAN | 1:58.48	Lynsey Sharp; GBR | 1:59.29	Marina Arzamasova; BLR | 1:59.97	Chanelle Price; USA | 2:00.80	Ajee Wilson; USA | 2:00.81	Joanna Jóźwik; POL | 2:01.24
Women's 5000m	Vivian Jepkemei Cheruiyot; KEN | 15:12.79	Mercy Cherono; KEN | 15:12.85	Janet Kisa; KEN | 15:19.48	Haftamnesh Tesfaye; ETH | 15:24.04	Eloise Wellings; AUS | 15:26.19	Genevieve Gregson; AUS | 15:27.13	Birtukan Fente Alemu; ETH | 15:39.55	Dominika Napieraj; POL | 15:41.47
Women's 100mH (-0.3 m/s)	Kendra Harrison; USA | 12.46	Brianna McNeal; USA | 12.57	Kristi Castlin; USA | 12.75	Dawn Harper-Nelson; USA | 12.78	Tiffany Porter; GBR | 12.86	Nia Ali; USA | 12.95	Sally Pearson; AUS | 13.25	Lucy Hatton; GBR | 13.36
Women's 400mH	Cassandra Tate; USA | 54.57	Eilidh Doyle; GBR | 54.57	Georganne Moline; USA | 54.63	Dalilah Muhammad; USA | 54.75	Kemi Adekoya; BRN | 55.28	Joanna Linkiewicz; POL | 55.41	Kaliese Carter; JAM | 55.96	Denisa Rosolová; CZE | 56.50
Women's Pole Vault	Yarisley Silva; CUB | 4.84 m	Aikaterini Stefanidi; GRE | 4.77 m	Nicole Büchler; SUI | 4.77 m	Fabiana Murer; BRA | 4.70 m	Wilma Murto; FIN | 4.50 m	Katie Moon; USA | 4.50 m	Nikoleta Kyriakopoulou; GRE | 4.50 m	Holly Bradshaw; GBR | 4.35 m
Women's Triple Jump	Olga Rypakova; KAZ | 14.61 m	Caterine Ibarguen; COL | 14.56 m	Olha Saladukha; UKR | 14.40 m	Kimberly Williams; JAM | 14.36 m	Paraskevi Papachristou; GRE | 14.26 m	Liadagmis Povea; CUB | 13.92 m	Shanieka Ricketts; JAM | 13.88 m	Laura Samuel; GBR | 13.12 m
Women's Shot Put	Tia Brooks-Wannemacher; USA | 19.73 m	Valerie Adams; NZL | 19.63 m	Cleopatra Borel; TTO | 18.78 m	Anita Márton; HUN | 18.41 m	Jillian Camarena-Williams; USA | 17.74 m	Brittany Smith; USA | 16.82 m	Sophie McKinna; GBR | 16.49 m	Rachel Wallader; GBR | 16.44 m
Women's Javelin Throw	Madara Palameika; LAT | 65.68 m	Kathryn Mitchell; AUS | 63.93 m	Linda Stahl; GER | 61.62 m	Christina Obergföll; GER | 61.27 m	Elizabeth Gleadle; CAN | 61.00 m	Brittany Borman; USA | 58.76 m	Sunette Viljoen; RSA | 58.54 m	Katharina Molitor; GER | 58.41 m

Oslo
Event	1st +10 pts	2nd +6 pts	3rd +4 pts	4th +3 pts	5th +2 pts	6th +1 pts	7th ⠀	8th ⠀
Men's 100m (+0.6 m/s)	Andre de Grasse; CAN | 10.07	Michael Rodgers; USA | 10.09	Dentarius Locke; USA | 10.12	Ameer Webb; USA | 10.18	Christophe Lemaitre; FRA | 10.20	Sean McLean; USA | 10.32	Wilfried Koffi Hua; CIV | 10.35	Kim Collins; SKN | 11.59
Men's Mile	Asbel Kiprop; KEN | 3:51.48	Elijah Motonei Manangoi; KEN | 3:52.04	Taoufik Makhloufi; ALG | 3:52.24	Nick Willis; NZL | 3:52.26	Ryan Gregson; AUS | 3:52.59	Charlie da'Vall Grice; GBR | 3:52.85	Henrik Ingebrigtsen; NOR | 3:53.19	Filip Ingebrigtsen; NOR | 3:55.02
Men's 5000m	Hagos Gebrhiwet; ETH | 13:07.70	Muktar Edris; ETH | 13:08.11	Yomif Kejelcha; ETH | 13:08.34	Abdelaati Iguider; MAR | 13:08.61	Isiah Kiplangat Koech; KEN | 13:10.18	Dejen Gebremeskel; ETH | 13:10.68	Abadi Hadis; ETH | 13:11.45	Hayle Ibrahimov; AZE | 13:13.92
Men's 400mH	Yasmani Copello; TUR | 48.79	Javier Culson; PUR | 48.99	Michael Tinsley; USA | 49.02	Kerron Clement; USA | 49.61	Karsten Warholm; NOR | 49.80	Nicholas Bett; KEN | 49.85	Patryk Dobek; POL | 50.27	Øyvind Strømmen Kjerpeset; NOR | 50.98
Men's Pole Vault	Renaud Lavillenie; FRA | 5.80 m	Shawnacy Barber; CAN | 5.73 m	Paweł Wojciechowski; POL | 5.65 m	Stanley Joseph; FRA | 5.55 m	Changrui Xue; CHN | 5.40 m	Eirik Dolve; NOR | 5.25 m	Per Magne Florvaag; NOR | DNS	Robert Sobera; POL | NH
Men's Triple Jump	Alexis Copello; AZE | 16.91 m	Teddy Tamgho; FRA | 16.80 m	Max Heß; GER | 16.69 m	Chris Benard; USA | 16.66 m	Omar Craddock; USA | 16.48 m	Troy Doris; GUY | 16.48 m	Nelson Évora; POR | 16.38 m	Godfrey Khotso Mokoena; RSA | 16.08 m
Men's Shot Put	Joe Kovacs; USA | 22.01 m	Konrad Bukowiecki; POL | 21.14 m	Tomasz Majewski; POL | 20.56 m	Tim Nedow; CAN | 20.40 m	Asmir Kolašinac; SRB | 19.84 m	O'Dayne Richards; JAM | 19.14 m	Marcus Thomsen; NOR | 17.68 m	
Men's Javelin Throw	Thomas Röhler; GER | 89.30 m	Johannes Vetter; GER | 87.11 m	Keshorn Walcott; TTO | 86.35 m	Hamish Peacock; AUS | 84.25 m	Ihab Abdelrahman; EGY | DQ	Jakub Vadlejch; CZE | 81.89 m	Julius Yego; KEN | 80.90 m	Andreas Hofmann; GER | 79.57 m
Women's 200m (+0.7 m/s)	Dafne Schippers; NED | 21.93	Elaine Thompson-Herah; JAM | 22.64	Ivet Lalova-Collio; BUL | 22.78	Simone Facey; JAM | 22.88	Jodie Williams; GBR | 23.29	Rosângela Santos; BRA | 23.65	Helene Rønningen; NOR | 24.21	Kimberly Hyacinthe; CAN | DQ
Women's 400m	Stephenie Ann McPherson; JAM | 51.04	Natasha Hastings; USA | 51.38	Novlene Williams-Mills; JAM | 51.66	Anyika Onuora; GBR | 51.85	Morgan Mitchell; AUS | 51.92	Libania Grenot; ITA | 52.03	Marie Gayot; FRA | 52.21	Line Kloster; NOR | 54.04
Women's Mile	Faith Kipyegon; KEN | 4:18.60	Laura Muir; GBR | 4:19.12	Meraf Bahta; SWE | 4:25.26	Sofia Ennaoui; POL | 4:25.34	Angelika Cichocka; POL | 4:25.39	Karoline Bjerkeli Grøvdal; NOR | 4:26.23	Gesa Felicitas Krause; GER | 4:29.58	Axumawit Embaye; ETH | 4:29.59
Women's 100mH (-0.4 m/s)	Brianna McNeal; USA | 12.56	Dawn Harper-Nelson; USA | 12.75	Jasmin Stowers; USA | 12.79	Tiffany Porter; GBR | 12.94	Cindy Roleder; GER | 12.94	Isabelle Pedersen; NOR | 13.12	Sally Pearson; AUS | 13.14	Alina Talay; BLR | DQ
Women's 3000mSC	Hyvin Kiyeng; KEN | 9:09.57	Sofia Assefa; ETH | 9:18.53	Etenesh Diro; ETH | 9:19.40	Madeline Heiner; AUS | 9:24.73	Charlotta Fougberg; SWE | 9:30.11	Genevieve Gregson; AUS | 9:30.52	Lidya Chepkurui; KEN | 9:32.48	Tigest Getent Mekonen; BRN | 9:42.23
Women's High Jump	Ruth Beitia; ESP | 1.90 m	Tonje Angelsen; NOR | 1.85 m	Michaela Hrubá; CZE | 1.85 m	Sofie Skoog; SWE | 1.85 m	Kamila Lićwinko; POL | 1.85 m	Erika Kinsey; SWE | 1.85 m	Marie-Laurence Jungfleisch; GER | 1.80 m	Alessia Trost; ITA | 1.80 m
Women's Long Jump	Ivana Vuleta; SRB | 6.94 m	Christabel Nettey; CAN | 6.68 m	Shara Proctor; GBR | 6.67 m	Tianna Madison; USA | 6.65 m	Ksenija Balta; EST | 6.61 m	Alexandra Wester; GER | 6.42 m	Nadia Assa; NOR | 6.39 m	Erica Jarder; SWE | 6.24 m
Women's Discus Throw	Sandra Perković; CRO | 67.10 m	Nadine Müller; GER | 63.09 m	Denia Caballero; CUB | 62.65 m	Shanice Craft; GER | 62.08 m	Yaimé Pérez; CUB | 61.91 m	Jade Lally; GBR | 59.56 m	Whitney Ashley; USA | 59.39 m	

Stockholm
Event	1st +10 pts	2nd +6 pts	3rd +4 pts	4th +3 pts	5th +2 pts	6th +1 pts	7th ⠀	8th ⠀
Men's 100m (-0.8 m/s)	Jak Ali Harvey; TUR | 10.18	Ben Youssef Meité; CIV | 10.25	Daniel Bailey; ANT | 10.31	Dentarius Locke; USA | 10.31	Richard Kilty; GBR | 10.31	Jonathan Quarcoo; NOR | 10.60	Odain Rose; SWE | 10.83	Andrew Robertson; GBR | DQ
Men's 800m	Ferguson Cheruiyot Rotich; KEN | 1:45.07	Pierre-Ambroise Bosse; FRA | 1:45.23	Adam Kszczot; POL | 1:45.41	David Rudisha; KEN | 1:45.69	Abubaker Haydar Abdalla; QAT | 1:46.10	Timothy Kitum; KEN | 1:46.96	Mohammed Aman; ETH | 1:47.00	Kalle Berglund; SWE | 1:47.20
Men's 5000m	Ibrahim Jeilan; ETH | 13:03.22	Yomif Kejelcha; ETH | 13:03.66	Muktar Edris; ETH | 13:05.54	Yigrem Demelash; ETH | 13:05.64	Yenew Alamirew; ETH | 13:11.88	Solomon Berihu; ETH | 13:12.67	Hayle Ibrahimov; AZE | 13:16.69	Getaneh Molla; ETH | 13:20.38
Men's 400mH	Javier Culson; PUR | 49.43	Kerron Clement; USA | 49.87	Patryk Dobek; POL | 49.89	LJ van Zyl; RSA | 50.21	Nicholas Bett; KEN | 51.14	Jonathan Carbe; SWE | 53.37	Bershawn Jackson; USA | DQ	Michael Tinsley; USA | DNF
Men's Pole Vault	Renaud Lavillenie; FRA | 5.73 m	Shawnacy Barber; CAN | 5.65 m	Mareks Ārents; LAT | 5.50 m	Stanley Joseph; FRA | 5.50 m	Melker Svärd Jacobsson; SWE | 5.50 m	Bokai Huang; CHN | 5.50 m	Konstantinos Filippidis; GRE | 5.35 m	Paweł Wojciechowski; POL | 5.35 m
Men's Triple Jump	Christian Taylor; USA | 17.59 m	Troy Doris; GUY | 16.70 m	Chris Carter; USA | 16.52 m	Chris Benard; USA | 16.39 m	Tosin Oke; NGR | 16.30 m	Alexis Copello; AZE | 16.29 m	Omar Craddock; USA | 16.29 m	Pablo Torrijos; ESP | 15.75 m
Men's Shot Put	Tom Walsh; NZL | 21.13 m	Michał Haratyk; POL | 20.54 m	Tim Nedow; CAN | 20.44 m	Konrad Bukowiecki; POL | 20.29 m	Mesud Pezer; BIH | 20.20 m	Franck Elemba; CGO | 20.17 m	Stipe Žunić; CRO | 19.64 m	Leif Arrhenius; SWE | 19.43 m
Men's Javelin Throw	Ihab Abdelrahman; EGY | DQ	Thomas Röhler; GER | 85.89 m	Julius Yego; KEN | 83.09 m	Ryohei Arai; JPN | 82.24 m	Keshorn Walcott; TTO | 79.71 m	Vítězslav Veselý; CZE | 79.11 m	Kim Amb; SWE | 78.97 m	Jakub Vadlejch; CZE | 78.16 m
Women's 200m (-0.8 m/s)	Dina Asher-Smith; GBR | 22.72	Simone Facey; JAM | 22.81	Desiree Henry; GBR | 22.88	Marie-Josée Ta Lou; CIV | 23.29	Kimberly Hyacinthe; CAN | 23.43	Margaret Adeoye; GBR | 23.57	Charonda Williams; USA | 23.68	Irene Ekelund; SWE | 24.01
Women's 400m	Novlene Williams-Mills; JAM | 52.29	Anyika Onuora; GBR | 52.46	Libania Grenot; ITA | 52.62	Seren Bundy-Davies; GBR | 52.71	Laviai Nielsen; GBR | 53.23	Małgorzata Hołub-Kowalik; POL | 53.35	Matilda Hellqvist; SWE | 55.47	Lisa Duffy; SWE | 55.61
Women's 1500m	Angelika Cichocka; POL | 4:03.25	Meraf Bahta; SWE | 4:04.37	Gudaf Tsegay; ETH | 4:04.37	Besu Sado; ETH | 4:04.89	Laura Muir; GBR | 4:05.40	Hellen Obiri; KEN | 4:05.88	Laura Weightman; GBR | 4:05.94	Dawit Seyaum; ETH | 4:06.07
Women's 100mH (-0.4 m/s)	Kendra Harrison; USA | 12.66	Nia Ali; USA | 12.85	Queen Claye; USA | 12.87	Alina Talay; BLR | 12.90	Susanna Kallur; SWE | 13.00	Isabelle Pedersen; NOR | 13.15	Anne Zagré; BEL | 13.19	Elin Westerlund; SWE | 13.55
Women's 3000mSC	Ruth Jebet; BRN | 9:08.37	Beatrice Chepkoech; KEN | 9:22.56	Genevieve Gregson; AUS | 9:23.19	Sofia Assefa; ETH | 9:27.73	Madeline Heiner; AUS | 9:28.75	Habiba Ghribi; TUN | 9:31.22	Purity Kirui; KEN | 9:31.26	Tigest Getent Mekonen; BRN | 9:31.84
Women's High Jump	Ruth Beitia; ESP | 1.93 m	Alessia Trost; ITA | 1.90 m	Kamila Lićwinko; POL | 1.90 m	Ana Šimić; CRO | 1.86 m	Sofie Skoog; SWE | 1.86 m	Levern Spencer; LCA | 1.81 m	Erika Kinsey; SWE | NH	Desiree Rossit; ITA | NH
Women's Long Jump	Ivana Vuleta; SRB | 6.90 m	Brittney Reese; USA | 6.88 m	Tianna Madison; USA | 6.68 m	Brooke Buschkuehl; AUS | 6.61 m	Shara Proctor; GBR | 6.46 m	Christabel Nettey; CAN | 6.45 m	Ksenija Balta; EST | 6.43 m	Erica Jarder; SWE | 6.37 m
Women's Discus Throw	Sandra Perković; CRO | 68.32 m	Melina Robert-Michon; FRA | 64.96 m	Denia Caballero; CUB | 63.85 m	Yaimé Pérez; CUB | 59.88 m	Irina Rodrigues; POR | 56.17 m	Jade Lally; GBR | 55.03 m	Julia Viberg; SWE | 53.13 m	Fernanda Martins; BRA | 52.63 m

Monaco
Event	1st +10 pts	2nd +6 pts	3rd +4 pts	4th +3 pts	5th +2 pts	6th +1 pts	7th ⠀	8th ⠀
Men's 200m (+0.1 m/s)	Alonso Edward; PAN | 20.10	Christophe Lemaitre; FRA | 20.24	Churandy Martina; NED | 20.29	Nery Brenes; CRC | 20.33	Shota Iizuka; JPN | 20.39	Julian Forte; JAM | 20.40	Yancarlos Martínez; DOM | 20.56	James Ellington; GBR | 20.59
Men's 400m	Wayde van Niekerk; RSA | 44.12	Machel Cedenio; TTO | 44.34	Bralon Taplin; GRN | 44.38	Tony McQuay; USA | 44.79	Isaac Makwala; BOT | 44.90	Pavel Maslák; CZE | 45.13	Kévin Borlée; BEL | 45.36	Mame-Ibra Anne; FRA | 45.82
Men's 1500m	Ronald Kwemoi; KEN | 3:30.49	Elijah Motonei Manangoi; KEN | 3:31.19	Taoufik Makhloufi; ALG | 3:31.35	Abdelaati Iguider; MAR | 3:31.54	Mo Farah; GBR | 3:31.74	Asbel Kiprop; KEN | 3:32.03	Ryan Gregson; AUS | 3:32.13	Jakub Holuša; CZE | 3:33.36
Men's 110mH (0.0 m/s)	Orlando Ortega; ESP | 13.04	Dimitri Bascou; FRA | 13.12	Pascal Martinot-Lagarde; FRA | 13.17	Wilhem Belocian; FRA | 13.42	Balázs Baji; HUN | 13.45	Damian Czykier; POL | 13.64	Antonio Alkana; RSA | 13.66	Omar McLeod; JAM | 16.82
Men's 3000mSC	Conseslus Kipruto; KEN | 8:08.11	Paul Kipsiele Koech; KEN | 8:08.32	Barnabas Kipyego; KEN | 8:09.13	Soufiane el Bakkali; MAR | 8:14.41	Abraham Kibiwot; KEN | 8:14.84	Andrew Bayer; USA | 8:17.39	Lawrence Kemboi Kipsang; KEN | 8:19.15	Sebastián Martos; ESP | 8:19.33
Men's High Jump	Gianmarco Tamberi; ITA | 2.39 m	Bohdan Bondarenko; UKR | 2.37 m	Majd Eddin Ghazal; SYR | 2.34 m	Robbie Grabarz; GBR | 2.31 m	Mutaz Essa Barshim; QAT | 2.31 m	Donald Thomas; BAH | 2.31 m	Derek Drouin; CAN | 2.27 m	Chris Baker; GBR | 2.22 m
Men's Long Jump	Damar Forbes; JAM | 8.23 m	Fabrice Lapierre; AUS | 8.21 m	Xinglong Gao; CHN | 8.00 m	Ruswahl Samaai; RSA | 7.93 m	Michael Hartfield; USA | 7.93 m	Changzhou Huang; CHN | 7.79 m	Tyrone Smith; BER | 7.56 m	Kevin Mayer; FRA | 7.51 m
Men's Discus Throw	Piotr Małachowski; POL | 65.57 m	Daniel Ståhl; SWE | 62.87 m	Mauricio Ortega; COL | 62.27 m	Zoltán Kővágó; HUN | 61.67 m	Gerd Kanter; EST | 61.60 m	David Wrobel; GER | 60.33 m	Robert Urbanek; POL | 59.62 m	Lois Maikel Martínez; ESP | 58.43 m
Women's 100m (-0.5 m/s)	Dafne Schippers; NED | 10.94	Veronica Campbell-Brown; JAM | 11.12	Carina Horn; RSA | 11.14	Morolake Akinosun; USA | 11.18	Tianna Madison; USA | 11.21	Desiree Henry; GBR | 11.21	Madiea Ghafoor; NED | 11.60	Marie-Josée Ta Lou; CIV | DQ
Women's 800m	Caster Semenya; RSA | 1:55.33	Francine Niyonsaba; BDI | 1:56.24	Eunice Jepkoech Sum; KEN | 1:57.47	Molly Ludlow; USA | 1:57.68	Lynsey Sharp; GBR | 1:57.75	Angelika Cichocka; POL | 1:58.97	Habitam Alemu; ETH | 1:59.68	Gudaf Tsegay; ETH | 1:59.77
Women's 3000m	Hellen Obiri; KEN | 8:24.27	Mercy Cherono; KEN | 8:27.25	Janet Kisa; KEN | 8:28.33	Karoline Bjerkeli Grøvdal; NOR | 8:39.47	Stephanie Twell; GBR | 8:40.98	Nicole Sifuentes; CAN | 8:46.25	Katie Mackey; USA | 8:46.58	Dominique Scott; RSA | 8:46.65
Women's 400mH	Eilidh Doyle; GBR | 54.09	Cassandra Tate; USA | 54.63	Sara Slott Petersen; DEN | 54.81	Wenda Nel; RSA | 54.93	Lea Sprunger; SUI | 55.42	Shamier Little; USA | 55.73	Phara Anacharsis; FRA | 56.20	Ashley Spencer; USA | 56.46
Women's Pole Vault	Aikaterini Stefanidi; GRE | 4.81 m	Yarisley Silva; CUB | 4.71 m	Fabiana Murer; BRA | 4.65 m	Holly Bradshaw; GBR | 4.65 m	Eliza McCartney; NZL | 4.55 m	Li Ling; CHN | 4.40 m	Nikoleta Kyriakopoulou; GRE | DNS	Alana Boyd; AUS | DNS
Women's Triple Jump	Caterine Ibarguen; COL | 14.96 m	Yulimar Rojas; VEN | 14.64 m	Kimberly Williams; JAM | 14.47 m	Patrícia Mamona; POR | 14.24 m	Olha Saladukha; UKR | 14.03 m	Olga Rypakova; KAZ | 13.97 m	Jeanine Assani Issouf; FRA | 13.68 m	Paraskevi Papachristou; GRE | NM
Women's Shot Put	Valerie Adams; NZL | 20.05 m	Christina Schwanitz; GER | 19.81 m	Michelle Carter; USA | 19.58 m	Tia Brooks-Wannemacher; USA | 19.13 m	Anita Márton; HUN | 18.36 m	Cleopatra Borel; TTO | 17.79 m	Emel Dereli̇ TUR | 17.39 m	
Women's Javelin Throw	Tatsiana Khaladovich; BLR | 65.62 m	Kathryn Mitchell; AUS | 63.80 m	Barbora Špotáková; CZE | 63.34 m	Madara Palameika; LAT | 62.79 m	Sunette Viljoen; RSA | 60.17 m	Sara Kolak; CRO | 59.97 m	Katharina Molitor; GER | 58.63 m	Mathilde Andraud; FRA | 52.78 m

London
Event	1st +10 pts	2nd +6 pts	3rd +4 pts	4th +3 pts	5th +2 pts	6th +1 pts	7th ⠀	8th ⠀
Men's 100m (+0.4 m/s)	Jimmy Vicaut; FRA | 10.02	Isiah Young; USA | 10.07	Churandy Martina; NED | 10.10	Marvin Bracy-Williams; USA | 10.11	Julian Forte; JAM | 10.11	Chijindu Ujah; GBR | 10.16	Richard Kilty; GBR | 10.16	Michael Rodgers; USA | 10.19
Men's 800m	Pierre-Ambroise Bosse; FRA | 1:43.88	Brandon McBride; CAN | 1:43.95	Ferguson Cheruiyot Rotich; KEN | 1:44.38	Nijel Amos; BOT | 1:44.66	Jeffrey Riseley; AUS | 1:45.13	Thijmen Kupers; NED | 1:45.23	Erik Sowinski; USA | 1:45.35	Mark English; IRL | 1:45.36
Men's 5000m	Mo Farah; GBR | 12:59.29	Andrew Butchart; GBR | 13:14.85	Bernard Lagat; USA | 13:14.96	Isiah Kiplangat Koech; KEN | 13:15.44	Ryan Hill; USA | 13:15.59	Ben True; USA | 13:16.63	Bashir Abdi; BEL | 13:19.16	Paul Kipsiele Koech; KEN | 13:23.10
Men's 400mH	Kerron Clement; USA | 48.40	Javier Culson; PUR | 48.63	Yasmani Copello; TUR | 48.70	LJ van Zyl; RSA | 48.92	Jack Green; GBR | 48.99	Sebastian Rodger; GBR | 49.35	Johnny Dutch; USA | 49.60	Michael Tinsley; USA | 50.72
Men's Long Jump	Xinglong Gao; CHN | 8.11 m	Damar Forbes; JAM | 8.05 m	Michael Hartfield; USA | 8.01 m	Wang Jianan; CHN | 7.91 m	Tyrone Smith; BER | 7.78 m	Michel Tornéus; SWE | 7.77 m	Jarvis Gotch; USA | 7.77 m	Ignisious Gaisah; NED | 7.74 m
Men's Triple Jump	Christian Taylor; USA | 17.78 m	Chris Carter; USA | 16.89 m	Bin Dong; CHN | 16.85 m	Chris Benard; USA | 16.73 m	Alexis Copello; AZE | 16.63 m	Harold Correa; FRA | 16.56 m	Omar Craddock; USA | 16.54 m	Tosin Oke; NGR | 16.37 m
Men's Shot Put	Joe Kovacs; USA | 22.04 m	Tom Walsh; NZL | 21.54 m	David Storl; GER | 21.39 m	Darrell Hill; USA | 21.24 m	Kurt Roberts; USA | 20.80 m	Tomasz Majewski; POL | 20.33 m	O'Dayne Richards; JAM | 19.99 m	Michał Haratyk; POL | 19.97 m
Men's Javelin Throw	Jakub Vadlejch; CZE | 85.72 m	Keshorn Walcott; TTO | 83.60 m	Hamish Peacock; AUS | 82.94 m	Johannes Vetter; GER | 82.89 m	Lars Hamann; GER | 81.62 m	Julian Weber; GER | 80.29 m	Zigismunds Sirmais; LAT | 79.52 m	Matti Mortimore; GBR | 68.41 m
Women's 200m (-0.8 m/s)	Dafne Schippers; NED | 22.13	Tiffany Townsend; USA | 22.63	Joanna Atkins; USA | 22.64	Jeneba Tarmoh; USA | 22.81	Jodie Williams; GBR | 22.99	Shalonda Solomon; USA | 23.11	Kaylin Whitney; USA | 23.12	Anna Kiełbasińska; POL | 23.41
Women's 400m	Shaunae Miller-Uibo; BAH | 49.55	Stephenie Ann McPherson; JAM | 50.40	Natasha Hastings; USA | 50.49	Francena McCorory; USA | 50.73	Christine Ohuruogu; GBR | 51.05	Floria Guei; FRA | 51.39	Emily Diamond; GBR | 51.63	Seren Bundy-Davies; GBR | 51.81
Women's 1500m	Laura Muir; GBR | 3:57.49	Sifan Hassan; NED | 4:00.87	Meraf Bahta; SWE | 4:02.62	Laura Weightman; GBR | 4:02.66	Axumawit Embaye; ETH | 4:03.05	Amanda Eccleston; USA | 4:03.25	Eilish McColgan; GBR | 4:03.74	Linden Hall; AUS | 4:03.81
Women's 100mH (+0.3 m/s)	Kendra Harrison; USA | 12.20	Brianna McNeal; USA | 12.57	Kristi Castlin; USA | 12.59	Nia Ali; USA | 12.63	Alina Talay; BLR | 12.66	Tiffany Porter; GBR | 12.70	Anne Zagré; BEL | 12.94	Jessica Ennis-Hill; GBR | 13.04
Women's 3000mSC	Habiba Ghribi; TUN | 9:21.35	Stephanie Garcia; USA | 9:26.26	Purity Kirui; KEN | 9:30.95	Aisha Praught-Leer; JAM | 9:31.75	Shalaya Kipp; USA | 9:34.12	Sara Louise Treacy; IRL | 9:39.41	Caroline Tuigong; KEN | 9:41.14	Ophélie Claude-Boxberger; FRA | 9:42.14
Women's High Jump	Ruth Beitia; ESP | 1.98 m	Mirela Demireva; BUL | 1.95 m	Katarina Johnson-Thompson; GBR | 1.95 m	Kamila Lićwinko; POL | 1.95 m	Levern Spencer; LCA | 1.92 m	Eleanor Patterson; AUS | 1.92 m	Morgan Lake; GBR | 1.92 m	Alyxandria Treasure; CAN | 1.92 m
Women's Pole Vault	Aikaterini Stefanidi; GRE | 4.80 m	Yarisley Silva; CUB | 4.72 m	Eliza McCartney; NZL | 4.62 m	Holly Bradshaw; GBR | 4.52 m	Michaela Meijer; SWE | 4.52 m	Kristen Brown; USA | 4.52 m	Fabiana Murer; BRA | NH	Katie Moon; USA | NH
Women's Discus Throw	Sandra Perković; CRO | 69.94 m	Dani Stevens; AUS | 64.10 m	Jade Lally; GBR | 61.65 m	Whitney Ashley; USA | 60.20 m	Nadine Müller; GER | 59.95 m	Irina Rodrigues; POR | 58.14 m	Shelbi Vaughan; USA | 56.63 m	Kirsty Law; GBR | 52.31 m

Lausanne
Event	1st +10 pts	2nd +6 pts	3rd +4 pts	4th +3 pts	5th +2 pts	6th +1 pts	7th ⠀	8th ⠀
Men's 200m (+0.4 m/s)	Churandy Martina; NED | 19.81	Alonso Edward; PAN | 19.92	Julian Forte; JAM | 20.16	Lykourgos-Stefanos Tsakonas; GRE | 20.21	Reece Prescod; GBR | 20.38	Solomon Bockarie; NED | 20.42	James Ellington; GBR | 21.34	Aaron Brown; CAN | DNS
Men's 400m	LaShawn Merritt; USA | 44.50	Steven Gardiner; BAH | 44.75	Liemarvin Bonevacia; NED | 45.26	Pavel Maslák; CZE | 45.35	Martyn Rooney; GBR | 45.46	Isaac Makwala; BOT | 45.62	Mame-Ibra Anne; FRA | 45.69	Joel Burgunder; SUI | 47.35
Men's 1000m	Ayanleh Souleiman; DJI | 2:13.49	Robert Biwott; KEN | 2:13.89	Jonathan Kitilit; KEN | 2:13.95	Asbel Kiprop; KEN | 2:14.23	Marcin Lewandowski; POL | 2:14.30	Matthew Centrowitz Jr. USA | 2:16.67	Nicholas Kiplangat Kipkoech; KEN | 2:16.68	Filip Ingebrigtsen; NOR | 2:16.95
Men's 110mH (+0.5 m/s)	Orlando Ortega; ESP | 13.11	Omar McLeod; JAM | 13.12	Dimitri Bascou; FRA | 13.25	Wilhem Belocian; FRA | 13.25	Balázs Baji; HUN | 13.34	Pascal Martinot-Lagarde; FRA | 13.37	David Oliver; USA | 13.40	Konstantinos Douvalidis; GRE | 13.69
Men's 3000mSC	Abraham Kibiwot; KEN | 8:09.58	Nicholas Kiptonui Bett; KEN | 8:10.07	Abel Kiprop Mutai; KEN | 8:17.88	Jairus Kipchoge Birech; KEN | 8:19.48	Brimin Kiprop Kipruto; KEN | 8:20.46	Donn Cabral; USA | 8:20.77	Amos Kirui; KEN | 8:22.59	Andrew Bayer; USA | 8:23.88
Men's High Jump	Mutaz Essa Barshim; QAT | 2.35 m	Robbie Grabarz; GBR | 2.32 m	Erik Kynard; USA | 2.32 m	Bohdan Bondarenko; UKR | 2.32 m	Andrii Protsenko; UKR | 2.29 m	Donald Thomas; BAH | 2.25 m	Pavel Seliverstau; BLR | 2.25 m	Konstantinos Baniotis; GRE | 2.20 m
Men's Pole Vault	Sam Kendricks; USA | 5.92 m	Piotr Lisek; POL | 5.72 m	Renaud Lavillenie; FRA | 5.72 m	Shawnacy Barber; CAN | 5.62 m	Robert Sobera; POL | 5.62 m	Stanley Joseph; FRA | 5.47 m	Paweł Wojciechowski; POL | 5.47 m	Tobias Scherbarth; GER | 5.47 m
Men's Discus Throw	Philip Milanov; BEL | 65.61 m	Lukas Weißhaidinger; AUT | 64.84 m	Zoltán Kővágó; HUN | 64.52 m	Robert Harting; GER | 63.12 m	Robert Urbanek; POL | 62.83 m	Piotr Małachowski; POL | 62.46 m	Gerd Kanter; EST | 62.03 m	Martin Kupper; EST | 61.93 m
Women's 100m (+0.8 m/s)	Elaine Thompson-Herah; JAM | 10.78	Jenna Prandini; USA | 11.11	Morolake Akinosun; USA | 11.16	Desiree Henry; GBR | 11.17	Marie-Josée Ta Lou; CIV | 11.25	Veronica Campbell-Brown; JAM | 11.27	Mujinga Kambundji; SUI | 11.44	Christania Williams; JAM | 11.48
Women's 800m	Francine Niyonsaba; BDI | 1:57.71	Eunice Jepkoech Sum; KEN | 1:58.41	Lynsey Sharp; GBR | 1:58.52	Melissa Bishop-Nriagu; CAN | 1:58.71	Selina Rutz-Büchel; SUI | 1:58.77	Habitam Alemu; ETH | 2:00.46	Nataliia Krol; UKR | 2:00.59	Winny Chebet; KEN | 2:02.21
Women's 3000m	Genzebe Dibaba; ETH | 8:31.84	Hellen Obiri; KEN | 8:33.96	Mercy Cherono; KEN | 8:34.49	Margaret Chelimo Kipkemboi; KEN | 8:37.54	Janet Kisa; KEN | 8:43.34	Agnes Jebet Tirop; KEN | 8:50.74	Haftamnesh Tesfaye; ETH | 9:11.29	Alexa Efraimson; USA | 9:11.48
Women's 400mH	Dalilah Muhammad; USA | 53.78	Eilidh Doyle; GBR | 54.45	Sara Slott Petersen; DEN | 54.98	Cassandra Tate; USA | 55.14	Shamier Little; USA | 55.20	Ashley Spencer; USA | 55.86	Hanna Titimets; UKR | 55.99	Lea Sprunger; SUI | 56.05
Women's Long Jump	Ivana Vuleta; SRB | 6.83 m	Lorraine Ugen; GBR | 6.71 m	Darya Klishina; ANA | 6.50 m	Shara Proctor; GBR | 6.48 m	Tianna Madison; USA | 6.46 m	Blessing Okagbare; NGR | 6.11 m	Akela Jones; BAR | DNS	
Women's Triple Jump	Caterine Ibarguen; COL | 14.76 m	Olga Rypakova; KAZ | 14.53 m	Paraskevi Papachristou; GRE | 14.18 m	Patrícia Mamona; POR | 14.05 m	Olha Saladukha; UKR | 13.95 m	Kimberly Williams; JAM | 13.75 m	Ruslana Tsykhotska; UKR | 13.54 m	Jenny Elbe; GER | DNS
Women's Shot Put	Valerie Adams; NZL | 19.94 m	Michelle Carter; USA | 19.49 m	Christina Schwanitz; GER | 19.33 m	Brittany Smith; USA | 18.94 m	Anita Márton; HUN | 18.60 m	Aliona Dubitskaya; BLR | 17.81 m	Felisha Johnson; USA | 17.54 m	
Women's Javelin Throw	Madara Palameika; LAT | 65.29 m	Barbora Špotáková; CZE | 64.48 m	Tatsiana Khaladovich; BLR | 64.15 m	Kathryn Mitchell; AUS | 62.85 m	Sunette Viljoen; RSA | 62.47 m	Liina Laasma; EST | 60.91 m	Christina Obergföll; GER | 53.97 m	Maria Andrejczyk; POL | 53.49 m

Paris
Event	1st +10 pts	2nd +6 pts	3rd +4 pts	4th +3 pts	5th +2 pts	6th +1 pts	7th ⠀	8th ⠀
Men's 100m (-0.1 m/s)	Ben Youssef Meité; CIV | 9.96	Akani Simbine; RSA | 10.00	Churandy Martina; NED | 10.01	Joel Fearon; GBR | 10.05	Jimmy Vicaut; FRA | 10.12	Kim Collins; SKN | 10.12	Michael Rodgers; USA | 10.14	Chijindu Ujah; GBR | 10.15
Men's 800m	Alfred Kipketer; KEN | 1:42.87	Taoufik Makhloufi; ALG | 1:42.98	Jonathan Kitilit; KEN | 1:43.05	Ferguson Cheruiyot Rotich; KEN | 1:43.43	Ayanleh Souleiman; DJI | 1:43.52	Pierre-Ambroise Bosse; FRA | 1:43.58	Marcin Lewandowski; POL | 1:43.73	Adam Kszczot; POL | 1:43.76
Men's 3000m	Yomif Kejelcha; ETH | 7:28.19	Abdelaati Iguider; MAR | 7:30.09	Hagos Gebrhiwet; ETH | 7:30.45	Ryan Hill; USA | 7:30.93	Albert Rop; BRN | 7:32.02	Bethwell Birgen; KEN | 7:32.48	Muktar Edris; ETH | 7:33.28	Paul Chelimo; USA | 7:37.98
Men's 400mH	Nicholas Bett; KEN | 48.01	Kerron Clement; USA | 48.19	Yasmani Copello; TUR | 48.24	Javier Culson; PUR | 48.55	Rasmus Mägi; EST | 48.66	Abdelmalik Lahoulou; ALG | 48.92	Mamadou Kasse Hann; FRA | 49.46	Michael Tinsley; USA | 52.11
Men's Pole Vault	Renaud Lavillenie; FRA | 5.93 m	Sam Kendricks; USA | 5.81 m	Jan Kudlička; CZE | 5.71 m	Paweł Wojciechowski; POL | 5.71 m	Shawnacy Barber; CAN | 5.61 m	Konstantinos Filippidis; GRE | 5.51 m	Robert Renner; SLO | 5.36 m	Stanley Joseph; FRA | 5.36 m
Men's Triple Jump	Chris Carter; USA | 16.92 m	Alexis Copello; AZE | 16.90 m	Jhon Murillo; COL | 16.90 m	Karol Hoffmann; POL | 16.78 m	Troy Doris; GUY | 16.68 m	Benjamin Compaoré; FRA | 16.59 m	Chris Benard; USA | 16.51 m	Omar Craddock; USA | 16.38 m
Men's Shot Put	Tom Walsh; NZL | 22.00 m	Ryan Crouser; USA | 21.99 m	Kurt Roberts; USA | 20.78 m	Ryan Whiting; USA | 20.65 m	Konrad Bukowiecki; POL | 20.36 m	Darrell Hill; USA | 20.30 m	Franck Elemba; CGO | 20.27 m	Joe Kovacs; USA | 20.18 m
Men's Javelin Throw	Jakub Vadlejch; CZE | 88.02 m	Julian Weber; GER | 87.39 m	Thomas Röhler; GER | 84.16 m	Dmytro Kosynskyy; UKR | 84.08 m	Keshorn Walcott; TTO | 82.40 m	Vítězslav Veselý; CZE | 78.38 m	Cyrus Hostetler; USA | 75.40 m	Johannes Vetter; GER | 74.34 m
Women's 200m (+0.1 m/s)	Dafne Schippers; NED | 22.13	Desiree Henry; GBR | 22.46	Jenna Prandini; USA | 22.48	Simone Facey; JAM | 22.70	Ella Nelson; AUS | 22.82	Natalia Pohrebniak; UKR | 22.95	Brigitte Ntiamoah; FRA | 23.69	Marie-Josée Ta Lou; CIV | DNF
Women's 400m	Natasha Hastings; USA | 50.06	Stephenie Ann McPherson; JAM | 50.33	Christine Day; JAM | 50.75	Kemi Adekoya; BRN | 51.05	Floria Guei; FRA | 51.16	Olha Zemlyak; UKR | DQ	Anyika Onuora; GBR | 51.70	Marie Gayot; FRA | 53.33
Women's 1500m	Laura Muir; GBR | 3:55.22	Faith Kipyegon; KEN | 3:56.72	Sifan Hassan; NED | 3:57.13	Shannon Rowbury; USA | 3:58.00	Dawit Seyaum; ETH | 3:58.09	Jenny Simpson; USA | 3:58.19	Besu Sado; ETH | 3:59.96	Sofia Ennaoui; POL | 4:01.00
Women's 100mH (+0.2 m/s)	Kendra Harrison; USA | 12.44	Dawn Harper-Nelson; USA | 12.65	Cindy Sember; GBR | 12.66	Jasmin Stowers; USA | 12.76	Cindy Roleder; GER | 12.78	Cindy Billaud; FRA | 13.02	Nadine Hildebrand; GER | 13.04	Sandra Gomis; FRA | 13.18
Women's 3000mSC	Ruth Jebet; BRN | 8:52.78	Hyvin Kiyeng; KEN | 9:01.96	Emma Coburn; USA | 9:10.19	Beatrice Chepkoech; KEN | 9:10.86	Sofia Assefa; ETH | 9:13.09	Genevieve Gregson; AUS | 9:14.28	Virginia Nyambura; KEN | 9:18.95	Stephanie Garcia; USA | 9:19.48
Women's High Jump	Ruth Beitia; ESP | 1.98 m	Levern Spencer; LCA | 1.96 m	Alessia Trost; ITA | 1.93 m	Svetlana Radzivil; UZB | 1.93 m	Inika McPherson; USA | 1.93 m	Airinė Palšytė; LTU | 1.90 m	Mirela Demireva; BUL | 1.90 m	Michaela Hrubá; CZE | 1.85 m
Women's Long Jump	Ivana Vuleta; SRB | 6.90 m	Lorraine Ugen; GBR | 6.80 m	Ksenija Balta; EST | 6.75 m	Shara Proctor; GBR | 6.55 m	Darya Klishina; ANA | 6.51 m	Éloyse Lesueur-Aymonin; FRA | 6.38 m	Tianna Madison; USA | 6.28 m	Blessing Okagbare; NGR | 6.26 m
Women's Discus Throw	Sandra Perković; CRO | 67.62 m	Melina Robert-Michon; FRA | 64.36 m	Denia Caballero; CUB | 61.98 m	Jade Lally; GBR | 61.45 m	Nadine Müller; GER | 60.07 m	Shanice Craft; GER | 59.32 m	Zinaida Sendriutė; LTU | 59.23 m	Pauline Pousse; FRA | 56.65 m

Zurich
Event	1st +20 pts	2nd +12 pts	3rd +8 pts	4th +6 pts	5th +4 pts	6th +2 pts	7th ⠀	8th ⠀
Men's 100m (+0.4 m/s)	Asafa Powell; JAM | 9.94	Akani Simbine; RSA | 9.99	Ben Youssef Meité; CIV | 9.99	Kim Collins; SKN | 10.10	Adam Gemili; GBR | 10.11	Omar McLeod; JAM | 10.12	Churandy Martina; NED | 10.13	Chijindu Ujah; GBR | 10.13
Men's 400m	LaShawn Merritt; USA | 44.64	Bralon Taplin; GRN | 44.70	Nery Brenes; CRC | 45.18	Martyn Rooney; GBR | 45.32	Steven Gardiner; BAH | 45.66	Isaac Makwala; BOT | 45.68	Pavel Maslák; CZE | 45.81	Matthew Hudson-Smith; GBR | DNF
Men's 5000m	Hagos Gebrhiwet; ETH | 13:14.82	Paul Chelimo; USA | 13:16.51	Evan Jager; USA | 13:16.86	Albert Rop; BRN | 13:17.56	Abdelaati Iguider; MAR | 13:19.35	Bernard Lagat; USA | 13:19.73	Yomif Kejelcha; ETH | 13:19.90	Mohammed Ahmed; CAN | 13:20.31
Men's 400mH	Kerron Clement; USA | 48.72	Javier Culson; PUR | 48.79	LJ van Zyl; RSA | 48.80	Rasmus Mägi; EST | 48.90	Kariem Hussein; SUI | 49.21	Thomas Barr; IRL | 49.34	Keisuke Nozawa; JPN | 49.42	Bonface Mucheru; KEN | DNF
Men's Pole Vault	Sam Kendricks; USA | 5.90 m	Renaud Lavillenie; FRA | 5.90 m	Thiago Braz; BRA | 5.84 m	Piotr Lisek; POL | 5.72 m	Jan Kudlička; CZE | 5.72 m	Konstantinos Filippidis; GRE | 5.62 m	Stanley Joseph; FRA | 5.52 m	Robert Sobera; POL | 5.32 m
Men's Triple Jump	Christian Taylor; USA | 17.80 m	Troy Doris; GUY | 17.01 m	Chris Carter; USA | 16.75 m	Alexis Copello; AZE | 16.71 m	Chris Benard; USA | 16.71 m	Max Heß; GER | 16.69 m	Omar Craddock; USA | 16.56 m	Nelson Évora; POR | 16.48 m
Men's Shot Put	Tom Walsh; NZL | 22.20 m	Ryan Crouser; USA | 22.00 m	Joe Kovacs; USA | 21.20 m	Kurt Roberts; USA | 20.99 m	Franck Elemba; CGO | 20.75 m	Darrell Hill; USA | 20.68 m	Konrad Bukowiecki; POL | 20.46 m	Darlan Romani; BRA | 20.19 m
Men's Javelin Throw	Jakub Vadlejch; CZE | 87.28 m	Thomas Röhler; GER | 86.56 m	Julian Weber; GER | 84.29 m	Antti Ruuskanen; FIN | 82.69 m	Tero Pitkämäki; FIN | 79.63 m	Vítězslav Veselý; CZE | 78.59 m	Kim Amb; SWE | 78.52 m	Zigismunds Sirmais; LAT | 74.52 m
Women's 200m (+0.2 m/s)	Elaine Thompson-Herah; JAM | 21.85	Dafne Schippers; NED | 21.86	Allyson Felix; USA | 22.02	Dina Asher-Smith; GBR | 22.38	Simone Facey; JAM | 22.50	Veronica Campbell-Brown; JAM | 22.51	Michelle-Lee Ahye; TTO | 22.78	Mujinga Kambundji; SUI | 23.00
Women's 800m	Caster Semenya; RSA | 1:56.44	Francine Niyonsaba; BDI | 1:56.76	Margaret Nyairera Wambui; KEN | 1:57.04	Joanna Jóźwik; POL | 1:58.21	Kate Grace; USA | 1:58.28	Marina Arzamasova; BLR | 1:58.36	Nataliia Krol; UKR | 1:58.60	Melissa Bishop-Nriagu; CAN | 1:58.84
Women's 1500m	Shannon Rowbury; USA | 3:57.78	Laura Muir; GBR | 3:57.85	Sifan Hassan; NED | 3:58.43	Jenny Simpson; USA | 3:58.54	Dawit Seyaum; ETH | 3:58.63	Besu Sado; ETH | 3:59.47	Faith Kipyegon; KEN | 4:01.86	Meraf Bahta; SWE | 4:03.06
Women's 100mH (+0.4 m/s)	Kendra Harrison; USA | 12.63	Cindy Sember; GBR | 12.70	Dawn Harper-Nelson; USA | 12.73	Jasmin Stowers; USA | 12.78	Cindy Roleder; GER | 12.80	Megan Tapper; JAM | 12.90	Phylicia George; CAN | 12.93	Anne Zagré; BEL | 12.98
Women's 3000mSC	Ruth Jebet; BRN | 9:07.00	Hyvin Kiyeng; KEN | 9:10.15	Emma Coburn; USA | 9:17.42	Beatrice Chepkoech; KEN | 9:19.37	Etenesh Diro; ETH | 9:21.67	Sofia Assefa; ETH | 9:22.09	Virginia Nyambura; KEN | 9:29.16	Celliphine Chepteek Chespol; KEN | 9:32.30
Women's High Jump	Ruth Beitia; ESP | 1.96 m	Inika McPherson; USA | 1.93 m	Sofie Skoog; SWE | 1.93 m	Kamila Lićwinko; POL | 1.93 m	Airinė Palšytė; LTU | 1.90 m	Mirela Demireva; BUL | 1.90 m	Iryna Gerashchenko; UKR | 1.90 m	Levern Spencer; LCA | 1.90 m
Women's Long Jump	Brittney Reese; USA | 6.95 m	Ivana Vuleta; SRB | 6.93 m	Darya Klishina; ANA | 6.63 m	Ksenija Balta; EST | 6.63 m	Lorraine Ugen; GBR | 6.52 m	Tianna Madison; USA | 6.51 m	Shara Proctor; GBR | 6.51 m	Jazmin Sawyers; GBR | 6.44 m
Women's Discus Throw	Sandra Perković; CRO | 68.44 m	Melina Robert-Michon; FRA | 63.91 m	Denia Caballero; CUB | 62.80 m	Julia Harting; GER | 61.80 m	Nadine Müller; GER | 60.09 m	Shanice Craft; GER | 58.46 m	Zinaida Sendriutė; LTU | 58.24 m	Whitney Ashley; USA | 57.69 m

Brussels
Event	1st +20 pts	2nd +12 pts	3rd +8 pts	4th +6 pts	5th +4 pts	6th +2 pts	7th ⠀	8th ⠀
Men's 200m (+0.8 m/s)	Julian Forte; JAM | 19.97	Adam Gemili; GBR | 19.97	Churandy Martina; NED | 19.98	Christophe Lemaitre; FRA | 20.16	Ramil Guliyev; TUR | 20.21	Alonso Edward; PAN | 20.23	Daniel Talbot; GBR | 20.26	Solomon Bockarie; NED | 20.50
Men's 800m	Adam Kszczot; POL | 1:44.36	Kipyegon Bett; KEN | 1:44.44	Amel Tuka; BIH | 1:44.54	Ferguson Cheruiyot Rotich; KEN | 1:44.59	Alfred Kipketer; KEN | 1:44.61	Pierre-Ambroise Bosse; FRA | 1:44.63	Clayton Murphy; USA | 1:45.15	Jonathan Kitilit; KEN | 1:46.12
Men's 1500m	Timothy Cheruiyot; KEN | 3:31.34	Abdelaati Iguider; MAR | 3:31.40	Asbel Kiprop; KEN | 3:31.87	Taoufik Makhloufi; ALG | 3:32.21	Filip Ingebrigtsen; NOR | 3:32.43	Robert Biwott; KEN | 3:33.05	Vincent Kibet; KEN | 3:33.56	Bethwell Birgen; KEN | 3:34.03
Men's 110mH (+0.2 m/s)	Orlando Ortega; ESP | 13.08	Pascal Martinot-Lagarde; FRA | 13.12	Wilhem Belocian; FRA | 13.32	Dimitri Bascou; FRA | 13.37	David Omoregie; GBR | 13.43	Milan Trajkovic; CYP | 13.44	Balázs Baji; HUN | 13.50	Jarret Eaton; USA | 13.54
Men's 3000mSC	Conseslus Kipruto; KEN | 8:03.74	Evan Jager; USA | 8:04.01	Mahiedine Mekhissi; FRA | 8:08.15	Nicholas Kiptonui Bett; KEN | 8:11.20	Abraham Kibiwot; KEN | 8:12.81	Hillary Bor; USA | 8:13.68	Andrew Bayer; USA | 8:16.11	Yoann Kowal; FRA | 8:16.21
Men's High Jump	Erik Kynard; USA | 2.32 m	Mutaz Essa Barshim; QAT | 2.32 m	Robbie Grabarz; GBR | 2.32 m	Andrii Protsenko; UKR | 2.29 m	Pavel Seliverstau; BLR | 2.29 m	Majd Eddin Ghazal; SYR | 2.29 m	Donald Thomas; BAH | 2.26 m	Bram Ghuys; BEL | 2.20 m
Men's Long Jump	Luvo Manyonga; RSA | 8.48 m	Fabrice Lapierre; AUS | 8.17 m	Jarrion Lawson; USA | 8.04 m	Xinglong Gao; CHN | 7.98 m	Emiliano Lasa; URU | 7.90 m	Damar Forbes; JAM | 7.77 m	Henry Frayne; AUS | 7.75 m	Benjamin Gföhler; SUI | 7.49 m
Men's Discus Throw	Daniel Ståhl; SWE | 65.78 m	Piotr Małachowski; POL | 65.27 m	Lukas Weißhaidinger; AUT | 64.73 m	Martin Kupper; EST | 62.49 m	Philip Milanov; BEL | 62.38 m	Apostolos Parellis; CYP | 62.28 m	Robert Urbanek; POL | 61.96 m	Gerd Kanter; EST | 61.12 m
Women's 100m (+0.6 m/s)	Elaine Thompson-Herah; JAM | 10.72	Dafne Schippers; NED | 10.97	Christania Williams; JAM | 11.09	Desiree Henry; GBR | 11.12	Carina Horn; RSA | 11.14	Simone Facey; JAM | 11.23	Jeneba Tarmoh; USA | 11.40	Natasha Morrison; JAM | 11.64
Women's 400m	Caster Semenya; RSA | 50.40	Courtney Okolo; USA | 50.51	Stephenie Ann McPherson; JAM | 50.51	Shericka Jackson; JAM | 50.73	Natasha Hastings; USA | 50.84	Olha Zemlyak; UKR | DQ	Libania Grenot; ITA | 51.65	Floria Guei; FRA | 52.01
Women's 5000m	Almaz Ayana; ETH | 14:18.89	Hellen Obiri; KEN | 14:25.78	Senbere Teferi; ETH | 14:29.82	Etenesh Diro; ETH | 14:33.30	Shannon Rowbury; USA | 14:38.92	Alice Aprot Nawowuna; KEN | 14:39.56	Viola Jelagat Kibiwot; KEN | 14:44.09	Margaret Chelimo Kipkemboi; KEN | 14:47.24
Women's 400mH	Cassandra Tate; USA | 54.47	Sara Slott Petersen; DEN | 54.60	Kaliese Carter; JAM | 55.05	Zuzana Hejnová; CZE | 55.12	Eilidh Doyle; GBR | 55.26	Wenda Nel; RSA | 55.41	Jaide Stepter Baynes; USA | 55.88	Hanna Titimets; UKR | 55.92
Women's Pole Vault	Sandi Morris; USA | 5.00 m	Aikaterini Stefanidi; GRE | 4.76 m	Nicole Büchler; SUI | 4.58 m	Lisa Ryzih; GER | 4.52 m	Tina Šutej; SLO | 4.42 m	Alysha Newman; CAN | 4.42 m	Kelsie Ahbe; CAN | 4.32 m	Angelica Moser; SUI | 4.32 m
Women's Triple Jump	Caterine Ibarguen; COL | 14.66 m	Olga Rypakova; KAZ | 14.41 m	Patrícia Mamona; POR | 14.16 m	Paraskevi Papachristou; GRE | 13.84 m	Kimberly Williams; JAM | 13.84 m	Dana Velďáková; SVK | 13.59 m	Susana Costa; POR | 13.55 m	
Women's Shot Put	Michelle Carter; USA | 19.98 m	Valerie Adams; NZL | 19.57 m	Anita Márton; HUN | 19.11 m	Brittany Smith; USA | 18.66 m	Aliona Dubitskaya; BLR | 17.79 m	Cleopatra Borel; TTO | 17.59 m	Melissa Boekelman; NED | 17.17 m	Brittany Crew; CAN | 16.95 m
Women's Javelin Throw	Madara Palameika; LAT | 66.18 m	Barbora Špotáková; CZE | 63.78 m	Kara Winger; USA | 61.86 m	Martina Ratej; SLO | 60.19 m	Tatsiana Khaladovich; BLR | 59.08 m	Liina Laasma; EST | 57.95 m	Kathryn Mitchell; AUS | 57.08 m	

== Rankings ==
=== Men ===
100 m
Rank	Athlete	Points
	Asafa Powell	26
2	Ben Youssef Meïté	24
3	Akani Simbine	18
4	Mike Rodgers	13
5	Kim Collins	10

200 m
Rank	Athlete	Points
	Alonso Edward	44
2	Churandy Martina	27
3	Julian Forte	25
4	Christophe Lemaitre	15
5	Adam Gemili	12

400 m
Rank	Athlete	Points
	LaShawn Merritt	50
2	Bralon Taplin	24
3	Isaac Makwala	20
4	Nery Brenes	10
4	Steven Gardiner	10

800 m
Rank	Athlete	Points
	Ferguson Cheruiyot Rotich	39
2	Pierre-Ambroise Bosse	29
3	Adam Kszczot	27
4	Alfred Kipketer	18
5	Amel Tuka	13

1500 m
Rank	Athlete	Points
	Asbel Kiprop	42
2	Elijah Manangoi	28
3	Abdalaati Iguider	21
4	Timothy Cheruiyot	20
5	Robert Biwott	14

5000 m
Rank	Athlete	Points
	Hagos Gebrhiwet	35
2	Muktar Edris	30
3	Yomif Kejelcha	22
4	Abdalaati Iguider	13
5	Paul Chelimo	12

3000 m s'chase
Rank	Athlete	Points
	Conseslus Kipruto	70
2	Abraham Kibiwot	20
2	Paul Kipsiele Koech	20
4	Nicholas Kiptonui Bett	12
4	Evan Jager	12

110 m hurdles
Rank	Athlete	Points
	Orlando Ortega	60
2	Pascal Martinot-Lagarde	23
3	Dimitri Bascou	21
4	Wilhem Belocian	16
5	Balázs Baji	4
5	David Omoregie	4

400 m hurdles
Rank	Athlete	Points
	Kerron Clement	51
2	Javier Culson	35
3	L. J. van Zyl	17
4	Rasmus Mägi	8
5	Kariem Hussein	5

High jump
Rank	Athlete	Points
	Erik Kynard	46
2	Mutaz Essa Barshim	36
3	Robert Grabarz	31
4	Bohdan Bondarenko	29
5	Andriy Protsenko	8

Pole vault
Rank	Athlete	Points
	Renaud Lavillenie	72
2	Sam Kendricks	50
3	Piotr Lisek	15
4	Stanley Joseph	10
5	Thiago Braz da Silva	8

Long jump
Rank	Athlete	Points
	Fabrice Lapierre	36
2	Gao Xinglong	30
3	Luvo Manyonga	20
4	Damar Forbes	19
5	Jarrion Lawson	8

Triple jump
Rank	Athlete	Points
	Christian Taylor	60
2	Alexis Copello	32
3	Chris Carter	28
4	Troy Doris	21
5	Chris Benard	13

Shot put
Rank	Athlete	Points
	Tomas Walsh	58
2	Joe Kovacs	42
3	Kurt Roberts	22
4	Ryan Crouser	19
5	Konrad Bukowiecki	11

Discus throw
Rank	Athlete	Points
	Piotr Małachowski	54
2	Daniel Ståhl	34
3	Philip Milanov	26
4	Robert Urbanek	25
5	Lukas Weisshaidinger	14

Javelin throw
Rank	Athlete	Points
	Jakub Vadlejch	50
2	Thomas Röhler	46
3	Julian Weber	15
4	Keshorn Walcott	14
5	Vítězslav Veselý	8

=== Women ===
100 m
Rank	Athlete	Points
	Elaine Thompson	50
2	Dafne Schippers	34
3	Desirèe Henry	12
4	Carina Horn	11
5	Christania Williams	8

200 m
Rank	Athlete	Points
	Dafne Schippers	48
2	Elaine Thompson	30
3	Dina Asher-Smith	16
3	Simone Facey	16
5	Veronica Campbell-Brown	8
5	Allyson Felix	8

400 m
Rank	Athlete	Points
	Stephenie Ann McPherson	39
2	Natasha Hastings	32
3	Caster Semenya	20
4	Courtney Okolo	12
5	Shericka Jackson	9

800 m
Rank	Athlete	Points
	Caster Semenya	60
2	Francine Niyonsaba	50
3	Eunice Sum	17
4	Lynsey Sharp	15
5	Margaret Wambui	8

1500 m
Rank	Athlete	Points
	Laura Muir	40
2	Faith Kipyegon	36
3	Shannon Rowbury	23
4	Sifan Hassan	18
5	Dawit Seyaum	16

5000 m
Rank	Athlete	Points
	Almaz Ayana	50
2	Hellen Obiri	28
3	Senbere Teferi	15
4	Viola Kibiwot	11
5	Etenesh Diro	8

3000 m s'chase
Rank	Athlete	Points
	Ruth Jebet	56
2	Hyvin Jepkemoi	44
3	Sofia Assefa	19
4	Beatrice Chepkoech	18
5	Emma Coburn	16

100 m hurdles
Rank	Athlete	Points
	Kendra Harrison	70
2	Dawn Harper Nelson	23
3	Jasmin Stowers	17
4	Cindy Ofili	16
5	Cindy Roleder	8

400 m hurdles
Rank	Athlete	Points
	Cassandra Tate	50
2	Eilidh Doyle	40
3	Sara Petersen	20
4	Wenda Nel	18
5	Kaliese Spencer	13

High jump
Rank	Athlete	Points
	Ruth Beitia	61
2	Levern Spencer	25
3	Sofie Skoog	20
4	Kamila Lićwinko	19
5	Inika McPherson	14

Pole vault
Rank	Athlete	Points
	Ekaterini Stefanidi	62
2	Sandi Morris	30
3	Nicole Büchler	27
4	Lisa Ryzih	8
5	Tina Šutej	4

Long jump
Rank	Athlete	Points
	Ivana Španović	68
2	Brittney Reese	36
3	Lorraine Ugen	22
4	Tianna Bartoletta	15
5	Darya Klishina	14

Triple jump
Rank	Athlete	Points
	Caterine Ibargüen	76
2	Olga Rypakova	39
3	Paraskevi Papachristou	20
4	Patrícia Mamona	18
5	Kimberly Williams	15

Shot put
Rank	Athlete	Points
	Valerie Adams	58
2	Anita Márton	33
3	Michelle Carter	32
4	Brittany Smith	14
5	Aliona Dubitskaya	12

Discus throw
Rank	Athlete	Points
	Sandra Perković	80
2	Mélina Robert-Michon	28
3	Denia Caballero	24
4	Nadine Müller	20
5	Shanice Craft	9

Javelin throw
Rank	Athlete	Points
	Madara Palameika	59
2	Kathryn Mitchell	25
3	Barbora Špotáková	23
4	Tatsiana Khaladovich	20
5	Liina Laasma	9

== Meeting highlights ==
=== Doha ===
There were twelve world leads set at the opening meet of the season in Doha, as well as 4 meeting records at an event which has begun the Diamond League season each of the past 7 years. The women's triple jump proved to be an enthralling contest, as the lead changed hands 5 times between Caterine Ibargüen and Yulimar Rojas over the course of the 6 rounds. The women's pole vault also provided a spectacle as Sandi Morris jumped a height of 4.83 to equal the Diamond League record and set an outdoor world lead. Two Americans, Ameer Webb and LaShawn Merritt, won the men's sprint events, with Webb running 19.85 to go 23rd on the all-time list. All the women's track events had new world leads set, with the most impressive being Almaz Ayana's 3000 metres victory, where she ran less than a second outside her personal best to run the 19th fastest race of all time. In the men's field, Christian Taylor returned to the meet where he came within 25 cm of the world record last year, and won his event with 17.23.

=== Shanghai ===
Six world leads were set at this meeting, with five meeting records also falling. Two of the best performances of the night came in the women's 1500 metres and discus throw. Sandra Perković threw 70.88 which although placing 98th on the all time lists, is the second farthest mark this century, behind her throw to win the 2014 European Championships. In the 1500 metres, Faith Kipyegon ran a Kenyan national record to win, with a time that places her just outside the top 25 female 1500 metres runners of all time. Home favourite Gao Xinglong won the men's long jump, beating Rushwahl Samaai on countback. On the track, Justin Gatlin ran his first 100 metres race under 10 seconds this season, to win, beating Qatari Femi Ogunode. The men's 800 metres was won by Ferguson Cheruiyot Rotich, though there was some controversy, as world record holder and Olympic champion David Rudisha and Bram Som, the pacemaker for the race, were left waiting at the start of the race, having expected a recall due to field athletes being on the track when the gun fired.

=== Rabat ===
The first appearance of the Rabat leg resulted in ten new meeting records for the African venue, as well as four world-leading performances. The four performances were Caster Semenya's 1:56.64 in the women's 800 m (five hundredths slower than the series record), Almaz Ayana's 14:16.31 in the women's 5000 m (the fifth fastest run ever at that point), an 8:02.77-minute run by Conseslus Kipruto in the men's steeplechase (the fastest ever on African soil) and 7:35.85 in the men's 3000 m by home athlete Abdalaati Iguider (also an African all-comers record). On the track, three further meet records came from Elaine Thompson in the women's 100 m, David Oliver in the men's 110 m hurdles, and LaShawn Merritt in the men's 400 m.

In the field events, South Africa's Rushwahl Samaai cleared 8.38 m (27 ft 5 3/4 in) in the men's long jump for a meeting record and the best mark ever achieved in Africa. A throw of 67.45 m (221 ft 3 1/2 in) left Piotr Małachowski a comfortable winner in the men's discus in a meet record. In the women's triple jump Caterine Ibargüen had her 33rd straight win. Latvia's Madara Palameika winning mark of 64.76 m (212 ft 5 1/2 in) in the women's javelin was a meeting record and Ekaterini Stefanidi added nineteen centimetres to the African all-comers record with her win of 4.76 m (15 ft 7 1/4 in) in the women's pole vault.

=== Eugene ===
The Eugene meet produced nine world leads, five meet records, three area records, and two series records. The best results came from women's obstacle races. In the 100 m hurdles American Keni Harrison ran the second fastest ever time at 12.24 seconds, three hundredths off Yordanka Donkova's world record from 1988 and a NACAC area record. Ruth Jebet of Bahrain became the second woman to finish the steeplechase in under nine minutes, recording an Asian record of 8:59.97 with Kenya's Hyvin Jepkemoi a close runner-up in an African record of 9:00.01. Faith Kipyegon broke her own Kenyan record with a world lead and meet record of 3:56.41 in the 1500 m. Other world leads on the track came from Muktar Edris (men's 5000 m), Asbel Kiprop (men's mile), Tori Bowie (women's 200 m) and Mo Farah (men's non-Diamond race 10,000 m).

The men delivered the best field performances of that year's Prefontaine Classic. Joe Kovacs threw beyond 22 metres for a shot put world lead and Christian Taylor also did so in the triple jump with a meet record of 17.76 m (58 ft 3 in). In the men's javelin Ihab Abdelrahman of Egypt threw 87.37 m (286 ft 7 3/4 in) for a meet record and equal world lead. Among the women field athletes, discus thrower Sandra Perković was the only repeat winner, with Diamond leaders Levern Spencer and Ivana Španović reduced to runners-up by home athletes Chaunté Lowe and Brittney Reese in the jumps.

=== Rome ===
Almaz Ayana had the best performance of the night at 14:12.59 minutes for the women's 5000 m – this was (at one and a half seconds short of Tirunesh Dibaba's world record) the second fastest time ever and a Diamond League record. Caster Semenya equalled her own world lead of 1:56.64 to take her third straight win in the women's 800 m while Janieve Russell ran a world lead of 53.96 seconds in the women's 400 m hurdles. The sole world lead of the men's programme came from Conseslus Kipruto – a final-lap fall by Jairus Birech left Kipruto to his third steeplechase win in 8:01.41 minutes.

In Diamond races, Caterine Ibargüen had her 34th straight win. Bohdan Bondarenko took the lead in the men's high jump with his second win of the series while men's discus leader Piotr Małachowski slipped to sixth on the night (one of his worst placings of recent years). Among the women, Elaine Thompson (100 m), Ekaterini Stefanidi (pole vault), Valerie Adams (shot put) and Sunette Viljoen (javelin) had their second wins of the series to top the rankings.

=== Birmingham ===
Six world leads and five meet records resulted from the Birmingham leg. In the women's pole vault Yarisley Silva of Cuba set a Diamond League record of 4.84 m (15 ft 10 1/2 in). She and Mutaz Essa Barshim (2.37 m in the men's high jump) were the only world leads from the field events. On the men's track Conseslus Kipruto had his fourth straight world lead in a steeplechase meet record of 8:00.12. Asbel Kiprop had a world lead and meet record of 3:29.33 minutes in the men's 1500 m. In the men's 400 m, Kirani James had a meet record run of 44.23 seconds. In non-Diamond Race events, Mo Farah had a 3000 m world lead and British record of 7:32.62, while David Rudisha set an African record for the rarely run 600 m (also a world lead and meet record).

In women's track events, Francine Niyonsaba ran a meet record of 1:56.92 in the 800 m, breaking the series run of Caster Semenya (who was absent). Almaz Ayana's win streak was also broken in her absence, with Vivian Cheruiyot taking the 5000 m. Keni Harrison continued her streak in the 100 m hurdles with a meet record of 12.46 seconds. The upset of the night came in the women's triple jump, with Olga Rypakova ending Caterine Ibargüen's long-standing win streak by a winning margin of five centimetres.

=== Oslo ===
The best performance of the 2016 Bislett Games was by Dafne Schippers, whose run of 21.93 seconds in the women's 200 m was a Diamond League record, meet record and a world lead. Thomas Röhler had the only world lead in the field events at 89.30 m (292 ft 11 1/2 in) in the men's javelin. The mile events delivered the two other world leads of the meet with Kenya's Asbel Kiprop and Faith Kipyegon topping the fields there, each with their third Diamond League win of the year. Sandra Perković also had her third straight win.

In Diamond races, Michael Tinsley's streak was stopped by Yasmani Copello in the men's 400 m hurdles, while the absence of Americans Justin Gatlin (100 m), Christian Taylor (triple jump) and Keni Harrison (100 m hurdles) saw their unbeaten records of the series end. Without Gatlin in the men's 100 m, Andre De Grasse had the first Diamond League win of his career. Joe Kovacs maintained high performance in the men's shot put, going over 22 metres for his second win of the series.

=== Stockholm ===
With its overcast conditions, the Stockholm Bauhaus Athletics meet was the first of the year to produce no world leads. Ruth Jebet gave the sole meet record performance at 9:08.37 in the women's steeplechase. Three athletes achieved their first Diamond League wins: Jak Ali Harvey (100 m), Dina Asher-Smith (200 m) and Angelika Cichocka (1500 m). Keni Harrison and Christian Taylor returned to the top of their disciplines to take their third wins of the series, as did Ivana Španović and Renaud Lavillenie. Sandra Perković continued with her fourth victory to remain the only female athlete to go undefeated in the series. National interest came in the form of Susanna Kallur's return in the women's sprint hurdles, following a six-year absence from the sport by the world record holder due to injury.

=== Monaco ===
At the Herculis meeting, Caster Semenya was the top performer with a new Diamond League record of 1:55.33 minutes in the women's 800 m. This was also a South African record, meet record and a world lead. The runner-up Francine Niyonsaba also broke her national record at 1:56.24. Gianmarco Tamberi set an Italian record of 2.39 m (7 ft 10 in) in the men's high jump, though he left the stadium on a stretcher after missing the mat.

Conseslus Kipruto increased his streak to five wins in the men's steeplechase, while Piotr Małachowski (discus) and Caterine Ibargüen (triple jump) managed their fourth wins after one loss. Ekaterini Stefanidi and Valerie Adams took the top of their event rankings in the pole vault and shot put, respectively. Tatsiana Khaladovich of Belarus had her first career win of the series in the women's javelin.

=== London ===
The London Grand Prix featured a world record run by Keni Harrison, who ran 12.20 seconds for the 100 m hurdles to beat the old standard from 1988. This proved an emotional moment for world-leader Harrison, who burst into tears on the track; after failing to make the American Olympic team, she had said "only the record will make up for missing out on Rio". Britain's Laura Muir delivered a meet and British record of 3:57.49 minutes to win the women's 1500 m. Two further meet records came through Sandra Perković (her fifth discus win of the series) and Christian Taylor (in his fourth triple jump win and a world lead at 17.79 m (58 ft 4 1/4 in)).

Two additional world leads came from Mo Farah (12:59.29 in the 5000 m) and Shaunae Miller (49.55 in the 400 m). Joe Kovacs improved his shot put lead with his third win over 22 metres. Ruth Beitia and Ekaterini Stefanidi also improved their leads with their third and fourth wins, respectively. First career wins on the series came for three men: Gao Xinglong (long jump), Jakub Vadlejch (javelin) and Jimmy Vicaut (100 m). Usain Bolt won a non-Diamond Race 200 m, marking a return to form after injury.

=== Lausanne ===
Athletissima was the first meet after the Olympic Games in Rio and the fatigue showed, with no world leads produced. Sam Kendricks set a meet record of 5.92 m (19 ft 5 in) to win the men's pole vault, while Churandy Martina set a Dutch record of 19.81 seconds in winning the men's 200 m – his first Diamond League since 2012.

Orlando Ortega edged Olympic champion Omar McLeod to move to the top of the 110 m hurdles Diamond race. Olympic champion Elaine Thompson took the lead in the 100 m Diamond race with her win. In the women's field events Ivana Španović, Caterine Ibargüen, Valerie Adams and Madara Palameika all won to affirm near unbeatable leads in their events. Francine Niyonsaba won the 800 m in the absence of Olympic champion Caster Semenya. Abraham Kibiwot had his first Diamond League win in the absence of Olympic steeplechase champion Conseslus Kipruto.

=== Paris ===
The stand-out performance of the Paris Diamond League came from Ruth Jebet. After a dominant win at the Olympic Games, she turned her attention to breaking the steeplechase world record and duly achieved it with a time of 8:52.78 minutes – this was over six seconds faster than the previous mark set by Gulnara Samitova-Galkina (the only other woman who had run under nine minutes for the event). Genevieve LaCaze set an Oceanian record in sixth. Another fast race was the men's 3000 m, where Yomif Kejelcha won in a world under-20 record of 7:28.19 minutes. A third distance track event was also a highlight: Laura Muir improved her 1500 m national record with 3:55.22 minutes – a world lead, meet record and putting her 13th on the all-time lists.

Tomas Walsh set the second Oceanian record of the day with 22.00 m (72 ft 2 in) in the men's shot put (also a meet record). Moving towards the final, several athletes built unpursuable leads in the series, with wins from Renaud Lavillenie (pole vault), Dafne Schippers (200 m), Keni Harrison (100 m hurdles), Ivana Španović (long jump), Ruth Beitia (high jump) and Sandra Perković (discus). On the opposite scale, four men achieved their first ever series wins: Chris Carter (triple jump), Nicholas Bett (400 m hurdles), Alfred Kipketer (800 m) and Ben Youssef Meïté (who set an Ivorian record in the 100 m).
