= 2013 African Youth Athletics Championships =

I African Youth Athletics Championships
- Dates: 28–31 March
- Host city: Warri, Nigeria
- Venue: Warri Township Stadium
- Level: Youth
- Events: 39

The 2013 African Youth Athletics Championships were the first edition of the biennial athletics competition for African athletes aged fifteen to seventeen. It was held in Warri, Nigeria, on 28–31 March. A total of 40 events were originally scheduled but only 36 went ahead, 17 for boys and 19 for girls.

The Warri Township Stadium in Nigeria's Delta State, underwent significant renovation for the competition. The stadium was expanded to accommodate an international standard track and field and the installation of a Timetronics EDM (Electronic Distance Measurement) system was the first of its kind in the country. Emmanuel Uduaghan, the Delta State Governor, urged further use of the stadium for national and international events, as well as underlining the importance of good facilities to assist future generations of Nigerian athletes to attain an elite standard.

The girls' pole vault competition was cancelled as there were only two entrants and the walk events were rescheduled to take place as road, instead of track, events. The South African delegation was absent due to a lack of funds to attend to the event. The boys' hammer throw, 400 metres hurdles and pole vault were not contested despite some entries.

Nigeria topped the medals table with twelve gold medals and 33 medals overall (after doping disqualifications). The next most successful countries were Egypt (eight golds and 16 in total) and Ethiopia (26 medals, seven of them gold). Kenya placed fourth with five golds and eleven medals. Sixteen nations reached the medal table. Egyptian discus thrower Amira Khaled Mohammed was the first ever gold medallist of the championships. Nigeria was dominant in the sprint events, while Egypt performed best in the throwing events.

Divine Oduduru and Adewunmi Deborah Adewale of Nigeria completed 100/200 metres sprint doubles in the boys' and girls' sections, respectively. Kenyan Robert Biwott claimed both boys' middle-distance titles. His teammates Edwin Melly and Daisy Jepkemei achieved the same feat of winning the steeplechase and being runner-up in the 3000 metres. Egypt had the top two places in the boys' shot put and discus events as Mohamed Magdi Hamza and Sherif Adel Salem Ahmed gained a gold and a silver each. Uruemu Theophilus Ejovi won an unusual medal combination by taking bronze in the high jump and triple jump disciplines.

Several athletes at the competition went on to win medals at the 2013 World Youth Championships in Athletics held that July. Biwott won the world 1500 m youth title, Hamza was a shot put bronze medallist and Daisy Jepkemei won the world youth steeplechase silver medal.

== Medal summary ==
=== Boys ===
Event	Gold		Silver		Bronze	
100 metres	Divine Oduduru (NGR)	10.62	Amanuel Abebe (ETH)	10.86	Ismaila Adedeji Yusuf (NGR)	10.87
200 metres	Divine Oduduru (NGR)	21.56	Haji Turie (ETH)	21.90	Ismaila Adedeji Yusuf (NGR)	22.03
400 metres	Keita Tijani (GAM)	47.39	Gebre Galcha (ETH)	47.75	Samson Oghenewe Nathaniel (NGR)	47.89
800 metres	Robert Biwott (KEN)	1:47.01	Tsegay Tesfamariam (ERI)	1:47.89	Patrick Kiprotich (KEN)	1:49.82
1500 metres	Robert Biwott (KEN)	3:41.96	Yenew Tebikew (ETH)	3:43.84	Tsegay Tesfamariam (ERI)	3:44.29
3000 metres	Nftalem Kibrab (ERI)	8:17.28	Edwin Melly (KEN)	8:17.85	Meshack Letim (KEN)	8:18.19
110 metres hurdles	Ifeanyichukwu Andre Atuma (NGR)	14.00	Bashiru Abdullahi (NGR)	14.12	Creve Machava (MOZ)	14.31
2000 metres steeplechase	Edwin Melly (KEN)	5:42.18	Meresa Kahsay (ETH)	5:42.20	Hailemariyam Kiros (ETH)	5:45.50
Medley relay	Gambia (GAM); Ebrima Camara; Alieu Joof; Sonko Alagie; Keita Tijani	1:53.35	Ethiopia (ETH); Amanuel Abebe; Haji Turie; Gemechu Alemu; Gebre Galcha	1:54.31	Nigeria (NGR); Ismaila Adedeji Yusuf; Divine Oduduru; Oluwasakin Oluwab Omotoye; Samson Oghenewe Nathaniel	1:54.58
10 km walk	Gonfa Bonsa (ETH)	52:25.34	Getamesay Nigusse (ETH)	52:41.56	Yassine Khalouki (MAR)	54:36.02
High jump	Gemechu Tamiru (ETH)	2.00 m	Yatana Lamita (ETH)	1.95 m	Uruemu Theophilus Ejovi (NGR)	1.95 m
Long jump	Oreva-Oghene Jo Edafiadhe (NGR)	6.91 m	Mesfin Abebe (ETH)	6.85 m	David Oke Ejumeta (NGR)	6.85 m
Triple jump	Fabian Ime Edoki (NGR)	15.18 m	Felix Watmon (UGA)	15.05 m	Uruemu Theophilus Ejovi (NGR)	14.70 m
Shot put	Mohamed Magdi Hamza (EGY)	20.17 m	Sherif Adel Salem Ahmed (EGY)	19.57 m	Jacobus Rademeyer Wilhelm (NAM)	16.96 m
Discus throw	Sherif Adel Salem Ahmed (EGY)	60.46 m	Mohamed Magdi Hamza (EGY)	56.96 m	Jacobus Rademeyer Wilhelm (NAM)	42.77 m
Javelin throw	Ubang Ubang (ETH)	64.67 m	Fahmi Fahmi Yousse Talaat (EGY)	58.62 m	Valentine Udeh (NGR)	58.07 m
Octathlon	Mohamed Ramadan Moustafa (EGY)	5360 pts	Adetola Samuel Aladesuyi (NGR)	4820 pts	Louis Joe Stevenson (MRI)	4566 pts

=== Girls ===
Event	Gold		Silver		Bronze	
100 metres^{[nb1]}	Adewunmi Deborah Adewale (NGR)	11.87	Prenam Pesse (TOG)	12.25	Suraj Neima (ETH)	12.41
200 metres	Adewunmi Deborah Adewale (NGR)	24.13	Oluwatobiloba Amusan (NGR)	24.45	Tegest Tamangnu (ETH)	24.76
400 metres	Edidiong Ofonime Odiong (NGR)	54.46	Abimbola Junaid (NGR)	54.81	Moroko Galefele (BOT)	55.52
800 metres	Zeyituna Mohammed (ETH)	2:05.05	Durets Edau (ETH)	2:06.04	Oluwatobiloba Esthe Asamu (NGR)	2:06.59
1500 metres	Durets Edau (ETH)	4:27.61	Eva Cherono (KEN)	4:28.47	Yemegn Wedhen (ETH)	4:29.96
3000 metres	Mercy Chepwogen (KEN)	9:17.52	Daisy Jepkemei (KEN)	9:17.69	Tefera Adhena (ETH)	9:19.41
100 metres hurdles	Omar Gaber Lina (EGY)	14.04	Rebecca Temida Oshinbanjo (NGR)	14.73	Aderonke Adedolap Ademosu (NGR)	14.75
400 metres hurdles	Glory Onome Nathaniel (NGR)	62.04	Sarah Aderonke Kadiri (NGR)	62.92	Nezha Elghali (MAR)	64.99
2000 metres steeplechase	Daisy Jepkemei (KEN)	6:24.52	Stella Rutto (KEN)	6:30.64	Yeabsira Bitew (ETH)	6:42.18
Medley relay^{[nb2]}	Ethiopia (ETH); Neima Sefa; Tegest Tamangnu; Chaltu Shume; Kore Tola	2:13.55	Zimbabwe (ZIM); Yvonne Vanhuvanoe; Yvonne Thomas; Rutendo Kanda; Mzinde Ruva	2:22.33	Morocco (MAR); Rhizlane Siba; Salma Elmoutaraji; Nezha Elghali; Soukaina Hajji	2:23.83
5 km walk	Tege Gebretsadeke (ETH)	29:31.01	Habtamniesh Wale (ETH)	29:48.00	Sarah Loveth Malagu (NGR)	30:20.88
High jump	Rhizlane Siba (MAR)	1.80 m	Chinenye Juliet Anslem (NGR)	1.65 m	Ariat Diboow (ETH)	1.65 m
Long jump	Mohamed Samir Owis Esraa (EGY)	5.63 m	Mercy Abire (NGR)	5.63 m	Oluwatobiloba Amusan (NGR)	5.52 m
Triple jump	Kasie Veronica Ugeh (NGR)	12.56 m	Pascaline Boro (BUR)	11.90 m	Mohamed Samir Owis Esraa (EGY)	11.79 m
Shot put	Judith Anulika Aniefuna (NGR)	14.46 m	Khaled Mahmoud Saye Amira (EGY)	13.61 m	Rechelle Djossou (BEN)	12.93 m
Discus throw	Amira Khaled Mahmoud (EGY)	42.40 m	Fatma Khaled Abdou (EGY)	36.66 m	Carine Koukou (BEN)	21.32 m
Hammer throw	Mostafa Mohamed Esraa Mohamed (EGY)	61.52 m	Tarek Sayed Hassan Aya (EGY)	56.01 m	Esther Melissa Arlanda (MRI)	47.70 m
Javelin throw	Kasie Veronica Ugeh (NGR)	44.33 m	Bire Dubale (ETH)	40.35 m	Mohamed Tawfik Elsaee Aya (EGY)	36.31 m
Heptathlon	Hamdy Kamal Riham (EGY)	4604 pts	Rebecca Temida Oshinbanjo (NGR)	4463 pts	Salma Elmoutaraji (MAR)	4028 pts

== Medal table ==
* Host nation (Nigeria)

Rank	Nation	Gold	Silver	Bronze	Total
1	Nigeria*	12	9	12	33
2	Egypt	8	6	2	16
3	Ethiopia	7	12	7	26
4	Kenya	5	4	2	11
5	Gambia	2	0	0	2
6	Eritrea	1	1	1	3
7	Morocco	1	0	4	5
8	Burkina Faso	0	1	0	1
8	Togo	0	1	0	1
8	Uganda	0	1	0	1
8	Zimbabwe	0	1	0	1
12	Benin	0	0	2	2
12	Mauritius	0	0	2	2
12	Namibia	0	0	2	2
15	Botswana	0	0	1	1
15	Mozambique	0	0	1	1
Totals (16 entries)		36	36	36	108

== Doping notes ==
- ^{nb1} ^{nb2} ^{nb3} Cecilia Francis, the women's 100 m silver medallist and medley relay gold medallist for Nigeria (alongside Adewunmi Deborah Adewale, Edidiong Ofonime Odiong and Abimbola Junaid), was tested for drugs at the competition and gave a positive for anabolic steroids. Her results at the event were annulled per IAAF rules and she was banned for one year. The case also resulted in a lifetime ban for her coach Abass Rauf, who took the athlete to a doctor for an injection but refused to tell Francis what the substance was. A four-year ban was also given for 1968 Olympic champion Lee Evans, who was acting as her consultant at the time.
- ^{nb4} As a result of the above incident, in the women's 100 metres Togo's Prenam Pesse was upgraded to second place and Ethiopia's Suraj Neima Sefa moved up to third place. In the medley relay, the silver and bronze medallists, Ethiopia and Zimbabwe, were promoted to gold and silver medal positions, respectively. Morocco was upgraded from fourth to third in the medley relay. In the medal table, Togo and Zimbabwe moved up from joint 14th to joint 8th.
