= Robert Biwott =

Kenyan middle-distance runner

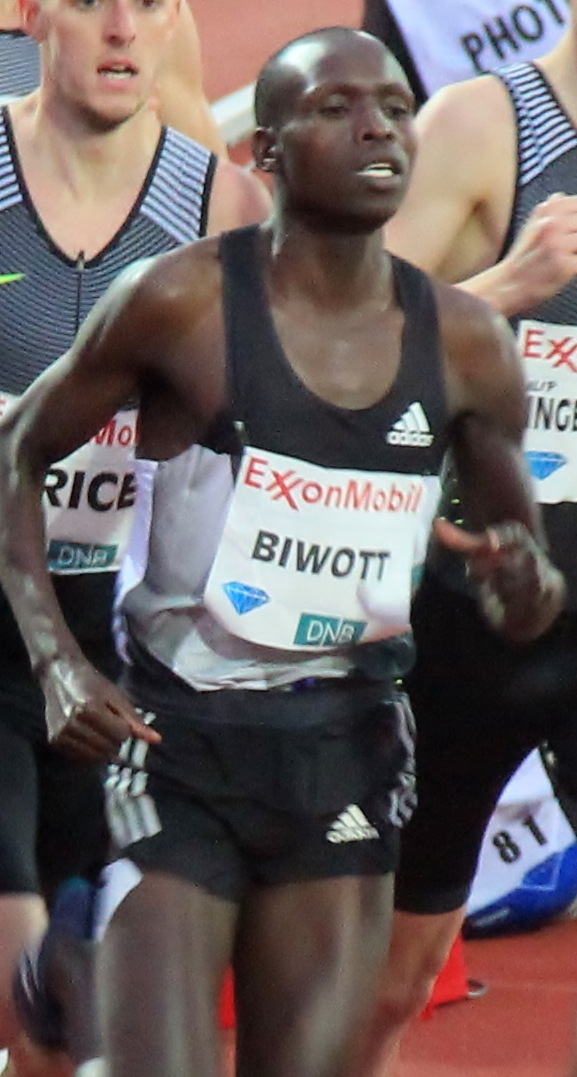
- Robert Biwott in 2016

Medal record

Men's athletics

Representing Kenya

World Youth Championships
Gold medal – first place	2013 Donetsk	1500 m

African Youth Championships
Gold medal – first place	2013 Warri	800 m
Gold medal – first place	2013 Warri	1500 m

Robert Kiptoo Biwott (born 28 January 1996) is a Kenyan middle-distance runner. In 2013, he won the World Youth Championship at 1500 metres and the African Youth Championship at both 800 m and 1500 m. He won the 800 metres in his Diamond League debut in 2014.

== Career ==
Biwott won two gold medals at the inaugural African Youth Championships in Warri, Nigeria in March 2013, running 1:47.01 in the 800 m and 3:41.96 in the 1500 m. In June he won the 1500 m at the Kenyan tryouts for the World Youth Championships in Donetsk, Ukraine, earning selection; his time of 3:38.5 was his personal best and at that point topped the annual world youth list. Biwott won by more than five seconds in Donetsk, running successively faster laps to improve his world youth leading time to 3:36.77; the time was also a new championship record.

Biwott debuted in the IAAF Diamond League at the 2014 Shanghai Golden Grand Prix and won a narrow victory in the 800 m after Algeria's Taoufik Makhloufi, the 2012 Olympic champion at 1500 m, started celebrating too early. Biwott's time, 1:44.69, was a personal best by more than two seconds.
