= 2014 Doha Diamond League =

- Dates: 9 May 2014
- Host city: Doha, Qatar
- Venue: Suheim bin Hamad Stadium
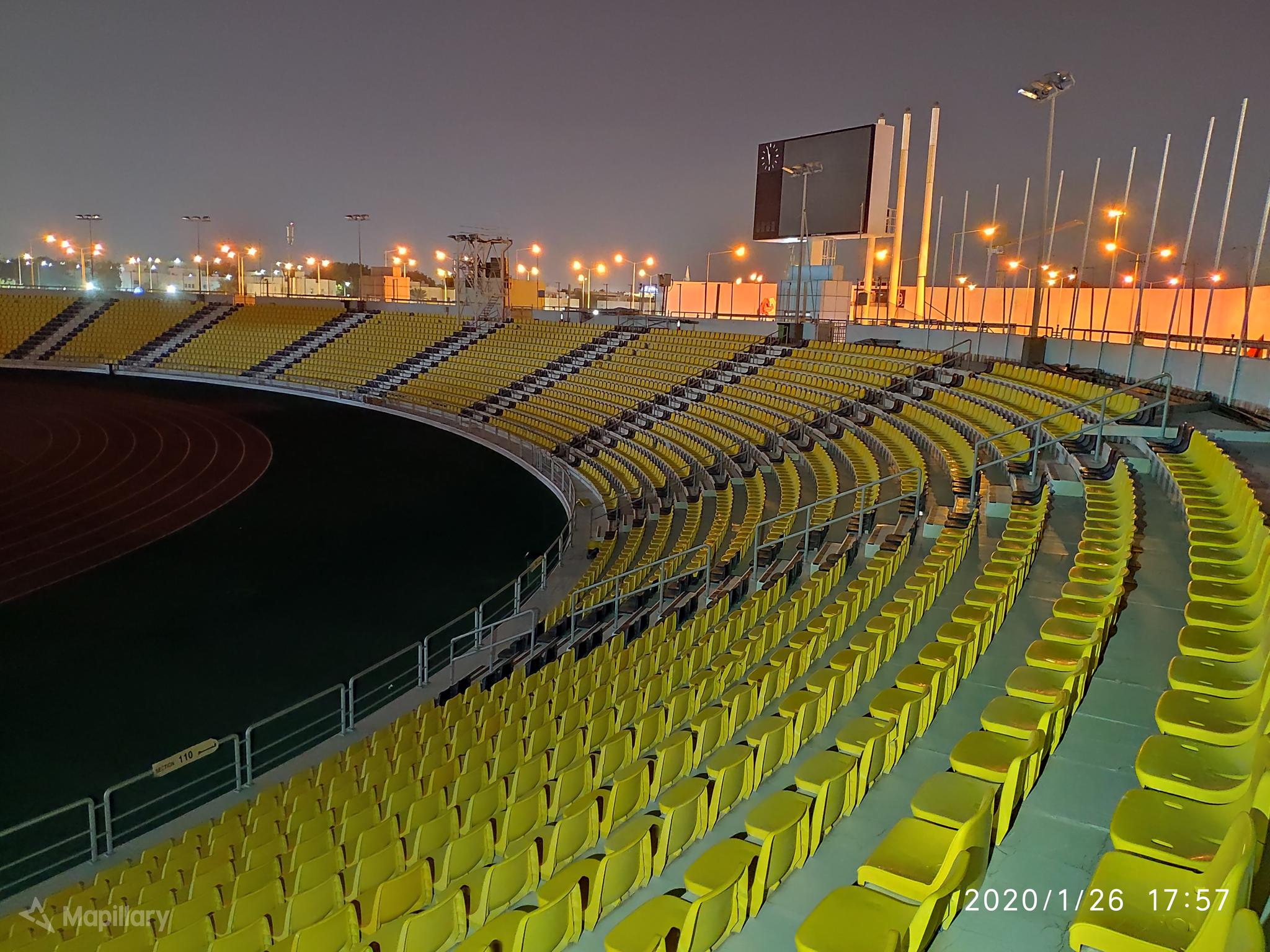
- Level: 2014 Diamond League

The 2014 Doha Diamond League was the 16th edition of the annual outdoor track and field meeting in Doha, Qatar. Held on 9 May at Suheim bin Hamad Stadium, it was the opening leg of the 2014 Diamond League – the highest level international track and field circuit.

== Diamond discipline results ==
Podium finishers earned points towards a season leaderboard (4-2-1 respectively), points per event were then doubled in the Diamond League Finals. Athletes had to take part in the Diamond race during the finals to be eligible to win the Diamond trophy which is awarded to the athlete with the most points at the end of the season.

=== Men's ===
200 Metres
Rank	Athlete	Nation	Time	Points	Notes
1st place, gold medalist(s)	Nickel Ashmeade	Jamaica	20.13	4	
2nd place, silver medalist(s)	Warren Weir	Jamaica	20.31	2	
3rd place, bronze medalist(s)	Femi Ogunode	Qatar	20.38	1	
4	Jaysuma Saidy Ndure	Norway	20.43		
5	Rasheed Dwyer	Jamaica	20.48		SB
6	Curtis Mitchell	United States	20.76		
7	Churandy Martina	Netherlands	20.86		
8	Dontae Richards-Kwok	Canada	21.30		
			Wind: (−0.2 m/s)		

400 Metres
Rank	Athlete	Nation	Time	Points	Notes
1st place, gold medalist(s)	LaShawn Merritt	United States	44.44	4	=WL
2nd place, silver medalist(s)	Yousef Masrahi	Saudi Arabia	44.77	2	SB
3rd place, bronze medalist(s)	Pavel Maslák	Czech Republic	44.79	1	NR
4	Tony McQuay	United States	44.92		SB
5	Luguelín Santos	Dominican Republic	44.94		
6	Kyle Clemons	United States	45.50		SB
7	Joshua Mance	United States	45.63		
8	Edino Steele	Jamaica	46.36		

1500 Metres
Rank	Athlete	Nation	Time	Points	Notes
1st place, gold medalist(s)	Asbel Kiprop	Kenya	3:29.18	4	MR, WL
2nd place, silver medalist(s)	Silas Kiplagat	Kenya	3:29.70	2	SB
3rd place, bronze medalist(s)	Ayanleh Souleiman	Djibouti	3:30.16	1	NR
4	Taoufik Makhloufi	Algeria	3:30.40		PB
5	James Kiplagat Magut	Kenya	3:30.61		PB
6	Aman Wote	Ethiopia	3:30.86		NR
7	Bethwell Birgen	Kenya	3:31.22		
8	İlham Tanui Özbilen	Turkey	3:32.09		
9	Collins Cheboi	Kenya	3:32.30		SB
10	Johan Cronje	South Africa	3:33.31		
11	Homiyu Tesfaye	Germany	3:33.33		PB
12	Benson Seurei	Bahrain	3:34.24		
13	Nixon Chepseba	Kenya	3:34.64		SB
14	Mohamad Al-Garni	Qatar	3:39.70		
~~15~~	~~Hamza Driouch~~	~~Qatar~~	~~3:47.48~~		DQ (Note: Due to doping violations Driouch's results during this competition were disqualified.)
—	Mekonnen Gebremedhin	Ethiopia	DNF		
—	Hillary Maiyo	Kenya	DNF		PM
—	Andrew Kiptoo Rotich	Kenya	DNF		PM

110 Metres hurdles
Rank	Athlete	Nation	Time	Points	Notes
1st place, gold medalist(s)	David Oliver	United States	13.23	4	=SB
2nd place, silver medalist(s)	Sergey Shubenkov	Russia	13.38	2	
3rd place, bronze medalist(s)	Pascal Martinot-Lagarde	France	13.42	1	SB
4	Jeff Porter	United States	13.52		
5	Ryan Wilson	United States	13.52		
6	Thomas Martinot-Lagarde	France	13.67		SB
7	Abdulaziz Al-Mandeel	Kuwait	13.79		SB
8	Tyron Akins	United States	13.83		
			Wind: (−0.5 m/s)		

3000 Metres steeplechase
Rank	Athlete	Nation	Time	Points	Notes
1st place, gold medalist(s)	Ezekiel Kemboi	Kenya	8:04.12	4	WL
2nd place, silver medalist(s)	Brimin Kipruto	Kenya	8:04.64	2	
3rd place, bronze medalist(s)	Paul Kipsiele Koech	Kenya	8:05.47	1	
4	Jairus Birech	Kenya	8:07.37		
5	Hillary Yego	Kenya	8:09.07		
6	Gilbert Kirui	Kenya	8:11.86		
7	Abel Mutai	Kenya	8:17.77		
8	Bernard Nganga	Kenya	8:23.41		PM
9	Hamid Ezzine	Morocco	8:23.66		
10	Jaouad Chemlal	Morocco	8:23.79		
11	Meresa Kahsay	Ethiopia	8:26.08		SB
12	Benjamin Kiplagat	Uganda	8:27.03		
13	Abubaker Ali Kamal	Qatar	8:31.24		
14	Habtamu Fayisa	Ethiopia	8:38.32		
—	Tarık Langat Akdağ	Turkey	DNF		
—	Haron Lagat	Kenya	DNF		PM

High jump
Rank	Athlete	Nation	Height	Points	Notes
1st place, gold medalist(s)	~~Ivan Ukhov~~	~~Russia~~	~~2.41 m~~	~~4~~	DQ (Note: Due to doping violations Ukhov's results during this competition were disqualified.)
2nd place, silver medalist(s)	Derek Drouin	Canada	2.37 m	2	
2nd place, silver medalist(s)	Erik Kynard	United States	2.37 m	2	=PB
4	Mutaz Barsham	Qatar	2.37 m		SB
5	Andriy Protsenko	Ukraine	2.27 m		
6	Marco Fassinotti	Italy	2.24 m		
7	Jesse Williams	United States	2.24 m		
8	Donald Thomas	Bahamas	2.24 m		
8	Mickaël Hanany	France	2.24 m		SB
10	Muamer Aissa Barsham	Qatar	2.19 m		SB
11	Kabelo Kgosiemang	Botswana	2.19 m		

Long jump
Rank	Athlete	Nation	Distance	Points	Notes
1st place, gold medalist(s)	Louis Tsatoumas	Greece	8.06 m (−1.0 m/s)	4	
2nd place, silver medalist(s)	Luis Rivera	Mexico	8.04 m (−0.5 m/s)	2	
3rd place, bronze medalist(s)	Ignisious Gaisah	Netherlands	8.01 m (−0.2 m/s)	1	
4	Christian Taylor	United States	7.95 m (−0.7 m/s)		
5	Zarck Visser	South Africa	7.74 m (−0.4 m/s)		
6	Godfrey Khotso Mokoena	South Africa	7.68 m (−0.5 m/s)		
7	Damar Forbes	Jamaica	7.67 m (−0.9 m/s)		
8	Saleh Al-Haddad	Kuwait	7.56 m (−0.3 m/s)		
—	Chris Tomlinson	Great Britain	NM		

Discus throw
Rank	Athlete	Nation	Distance	Points	Notes
1st place, gold medalist(s)	Piotr Małachowski	Poland	66.72 m	4	
2nd place, silver medalist(s)	Vikas Gowda	India	63.23 m	2	
3rd place, bronze medalist(s)	Gerd Kanter	Estonia	62.90 m	1	
4	Robert Urbanek	Poland	62.88 m		
5	Frank Casañas	Spain	62.75 m		SB
6	Victor Hogan	South Africa	62.14 m		
7	Ehsan Haddadi	Iran	61.86 m		
8	Erik Cadée	Netherlands	61.11 m		
9	Brett Morse	Great Britain	58.35 m		

=== Women's ===
100 Metres
Rank	Athlete	Nation	Time	Points	Notes
1st place, gold medalist(s)	Shelly-Ann Fraser-Pryce	Jamaica	11.13	4	
2nd place, silver medalist(s)	Blessing Okagbare	Nigeria	11.18	2	SB
3rd place, bronze medalist(s)	Kerron Stewart	Jamaica	11.25	1	SB
4	Carrie Russell	Jamaica	11.29		
5	Alexandria Anderson	United States	11.30		SB
6	Verena Sailer	Germany	11.40		
7	Barbara Pierre	United States	11.44		
8	English Gardner	United States	11.57		
			Wind: (−0.8 m/s)		

800 Metres
Rank	Athlete	Nation	Time	Points	Notes
1st place, gold medalist(s)	Eunice Sum	Kenya	1:59.33	4	WL
2nd place, silver medalist(s)	Chanelle Price	United States	1:59.75	2	PB
3rd place, bronze medalist(s)	Lenka Masná	Czech Republic	2:00.20	1	
4	Janeth Jepkosgei	Kenya	2:00.49		SB
5	Molly Ludlow	United States	2:00.55		SB
6	Tintu Luka	India	2:00.56		
7	Jenny Meadows	Great Britain	2:00.91		
8	Rose Mary Almanza	Cuba	2:00.91		
9	Shelayna Oskan-Clarke	Great Britain	2:01.94		PB
10	Rose-Anne Galligan	Ireland	2:02.42		
—	Agatha Jeruto	Kenya	DNF		PM

3000 Metres
Rank	Athlete	Nation	Time	Points	Notes
1st place, gold medalist(s)	Hellen Obiri	Kenya	8:20.68	4	AR, DLR
2nd place, silver medalist(s)	Mercy Cherono	Kenya	8:21.14	2	PB
3rd place, bronze medalist(s)	Faith Kipyegon	Kenya	8:23.55	1	
4	Viola Kibiwot	Kenya	8:24.41		PB
5	Almaz Ayana	Ethiopia	8:24.58		PB
6	Genzebe Dibaba	Ethiopia	8:26.21		PB
7	Irene Jelagat	Kenya	8:28.51		
8	Mimi Belete	Bahrain	8:30.00		PB
9	Senbere Teferi	Ethiopia	8:41.54		PB
10	Alemitu Heroye	Ethiopia	8:45.93		PB
11	Agnes Tirop	Kenya	8:47.26		
12	Maryam Yusuf Jamal	Bahrain	8:47.74		
13	Ababel Yeshaneh	Ethiopia	8:49.45		PB
14	Lilian Kasait Rengeruk	Kenya	8:53.41		PB
15	Alice Aprot Nawowuna	Kenya	8:53.55		
16	Tejitu Daba	Bahrain	8:59.60		
17	Irene Chepet Cheptai	Kenya	9:11.30		
—	Judit Varga	Italy	DNF		PM
—	Lydia Wafula	Kenya	DNF		PM

400 Metres hurdles
Rank	Athlete	Nation	Time	Points	Notes
1st place, gold medalist(s)	Kemi Adekoya	Bahrain	54.59	4	NR, WL
2nd place, silver medalist(s)	Kaliese Spencer	Jamaica	55.07	2	
3rd place, bronze medalist(s)	Eilidh Doyle	Great Britain	55.43	1	
4	Lashinda Demus	United States	55.67		SB
5	Georganne Moline	United States	55.90		SB
~~6~~	~~Hanna Titimets~~	~~Ukraine~~	~~57.02~~		DQ (Note: Due to doping violations Titimets' results during this competition were disqualified.)
7	Anna Ryzhykova	Ukraine	57.02		
8	Dalilah Muhammad	United States	58.02		SB

Pole vault
Rank	Athlete	Nation	Height	Points	Notes
1st place, gold medalist(s)	Nikoleta Kyriakopoulou	Greece	4.63 m	4	
2nd place, silver medalist(s)	Yarisley Silva	Cuba	4.53 m	2	
3rd place, bronze medalist(s)	Kristina Gadschiew	Germany	4.43 m	1	
4	Anastasia Savchenko	Russia	4.43 m		
5	Nicole Büchler	Switzerland	4.43 m		
5	Silke Spiegelburg	Germany	4.43 m		
7	Alana Boyd	Australia	4.23 m		
—	Mary Saxer	United States	NM		
—	Becky Holliday	United States	NM		

Triple jump
Rank	Athlete	Nation	Distance	Points	Notes
1st place, gold medalist(s)	Caterine Ibargüen	Colombia	14.43 m (−0.7 m/s)	4	MR, WL
2nd place, silver medalist(s)	Olha Saladukha	Ukraine	14.32 m (±0.0 m/s)	2	
3rd place, bronze medalist(s)	Kimberly Williams	Jamaica	14.15 m (−0.3 m/s)	1	
4	Mabel Gay	Cuba	14.09 m (−0.5 m/s)		
5	Patrícia Mamona	Portugal	13.96 m (−0.5 m/s)		
6	Dana Velďáková	Slovakia	13.90 m (+0.5 m/s)		SB
7	Snežana Rodić	Slovenia	13.73 m (−0.2 m/s)		
8	Keila Costa	Brazil	13.61 m (−1.1 m/s)		

Shot put
Rank	Athlete	Nation	Distance	Points	Notes
1st place, gold medalist(s)	Valerie Adams	New Zealand	20.20 m	4	MR
2nd place, silver medalist(s)	Yuliya Leantsiuk	Belarus	18.78 m	2	SB
3rd place, bronze medalist(s)	Anita Márton	Hungary	18.32 m	1	SB
4	Tia Brooks	United States	18.06 m		
5	Alena Abramchuk	Belarus	17.69 m		
6	Melissa Boekelman	Netherlands	17.51 m		
7	Shanice Craft	Germany	17.47 m		PB
8	Jessica Cérival	France	16.97 m		

Javelin throw
Rank	Athlete	Nation	Distance	Points	Notes
1st place, gold medalist(s)	~~Martina Ratej~~	~~Slovenia~~	~~65.48 m~~	~~4~~	DQ (Note: Due to doping violations Ratej's results during this competition were disqualified.)
2nd place, silver medalist(s)	Kim Mickle	Australia	65.36 m	2	
3rd place, bronze medalist(s)	Sunette Viljoen	South Africa	64.23 m	1	
4	Madara Sady Ndure	Latvia	61.17 m		
5	Linda Stahl	Germany	60.95 m		
6	Kara Winger	United States	59.97 m		
7	Sofi Flink	Sweden	58.34 m		
8	Nikola Ogrodníková	Czech Republic	58.16 m		PB
9	Sara Kolak	Croatia	53.10 m		

== Promotional events results ==
=== Men's ===
800 Metres
Rank	Athlete	Nation	Time	Notes
1st place, gold medalist(s)	Mohammed Aman	Ethiopia	1:44.49	
2nd place, silver medalist(s)	Nijel Amos	Botswana	1:44.54	SB
3rd place, bronze medalist(s)	Ferguson Rotich	Kenya	1:44.82	SB
4	Job Koech Kinyor	Kenya	1:44.95	
5	Jeremiah Kipkorir Mutai	Kenya	1:45.30	
6	Musaeb Abdulrahman Balla	Qatar	1:45.37	
7	André Olivier	South Africa	1:45.39	SB
8	Andrew Osagie	Great Britain	1:46.08	
9	Brandon Johnson	United States	1:47.59	SB
—	Bram Som	Netherlands	DNF	PM

== See also ==
- 2014 Diamond League
