= 2014 Diamond League =

2014 IAAF Diamond League
- Edition: 5th
- Dates: 9 May–5 September
- Events: 32
- Meetings: 14

The 2014 IAAF Diamond League was the fifth edition of the annual Diamond League. It consisted of fourteen one-day track and field meetings, starting on May 9, 2014, in Doha, Qatar and ending on September 5, 2014, in Brussels, Belgium. Other events were held in Shanghai, Eugene, Oslo, Rome, New York City, Lausanne, Paris, Fontvieille, Stockholm, Birmingham and Zürich. Glasgow, Great Britain hosted the event for the first time on July 11 & 12, 2014 at Hampden Park.

Justin Gatlin, LaShawn Merritt, Renaud Lavillenie, Eunice Jepkoech Sum, Dawn Harper-Nelson, Caterine Ibargüen, Valerie Adams and Sandra Perković all defended their titles from the 2013 IAAF Diamond League while Alonso Edward, Nijel Amos, Caleb Mwangangi Ndiku, Pascal Martinot-Lagarde, Michael Tinsley, Jairus Kipchoge Birech, Godfrey Khotso Mokoena, Mutaz Essa Barshim, Thomas Röhler, Veronica Campbell Brown, Novlene Williams-Mills, Jennifer Simpson, Mercy Cherono, Hiwot Ayalew, Tianna Bartoletta and Mariya Kuchina all won overall titles for the first time in their careers. All overall race winners received $40,000 in prize money.

The United States recorded the most overall wins with nine of their athletes claiming victories, their most successful season since the start of the Diamond League in 2010, with Kenya, France and Jamaica also having multiple athletes who claimed overall race victories. Other successful nations included Panama, Botswana, South Africa, Qatar, Poland, Germany, Ethiopia, Colombia, Russia, Brazil, New Zealand, Croatia and the Czech Republic. Having taken overall titles in the 2013 season, Great Britain, Estonia, Puerto Rico, Ukraine, Djibouti and Sweden did not have any athletes winning titles, although all except Estonia recorded individual race wins throughout the 2014 season.

== Meetings ==
The fourteen meetings for the 2014 IAAF Diamond League:

Date	Meet	Stadium	City	Country
09 May	Qatar Athletic Super Grand Prix	Qatar SC Stadium	Doha	Qatar
18 May	Shanghai Golden Grand Prix	Shanghai Stadium	Shanghai	China
31 May	Prefontaine Classic	Hayward Field	Eugene	United States
05 June	Golden Gala – Pietro Mennea	Stadio Olimpico	Rome	Italy
11 June	ExxonMobil Bislett Games	Bislett Stadion	Oslo	Norway
14 June	Adidas Grand Prix	Icahn Stadium	New York City	United States
03 July	Athletissima	Stade Olympique de la Pontaise	Lausanne	Switzerland
05 July	Meeting Areva	Stade de France	Saint-Denis	France
11–12 July	Glasgow Grand Prix	Hampden Park	Glasgow	United Kingdom
18 July	Herculis	Stade Louis II	Fontvieille	Monaco
21 August	DN Galan	Stockholm Olympic Stadium	Stockholm	Sweden
24 August	British Athletics Grand Prix	Alexander Stadium	Birmingham	United Kingdom
28 August	Weltklasse Zürich	Letzigrund	Zürich	Switzerland
05 September	Belgacom Memorial Van Damme	King Baudouin Stadium	Brussels	Belgium

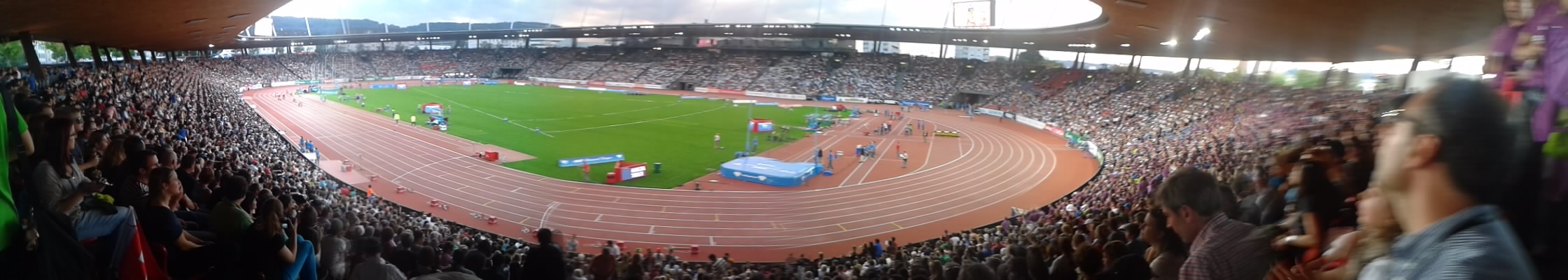
28 August: 2014 Weltklasse Zürich

== Events ==
There were 16 men's and 16 women's disciplines in the Diamond League and seven events per discipline in the season. Each event had a prize money of US$30,000, with a winner's share of $10,000. The season winner of each discipline won US$40,000.

Track	Field
100 m; 200 m; 400 m; 800 m; 1500 m / Mile; 5000 m / 3000 m; 110 m hurdles (men); 100 m hurdles (women); 400 m hurdles; 3000 m steeplechase	Pole vault; High jump; Long jump; Triple jump; Shot put; Discus throw; Javelin throw

== Winners ==
Events not included in the Diamond League are marked in grey background.

=== Men ===
==== Track ====
#	Meeting	100 m	200 m	400 m	800 m	1500 m	5000 m	110 m h	400 m h	3000 m st
1	Doha	–	Nickel Ashmeade (JAM) 20.13	LaShawn Merritt (USA) 44.44 =WL	Mohammed Aman (ETH) 1:44.49	Asbel Kiprop (KEN) 3:29.18 WL, MR	–	David Oliver (USA) 13.23 =SB	–	Ezekiel Kemboi (KEN) 8:04.12 WL
2	Shanghai	Justin Gatlin (USA) 9.92 WL	–	–	Robert Biwott (KEN) 1:44.69 PB	–	Yenew Alamirew (ETH) 13:04.83 MR	Xie Wenjun (CHN) 13.23 PB	Michael Tinsley (USA) 48.77 MR	–
3	Eugene	Justin Gatlin (USA) 9.76w	–	Kirani James (GRN) 43.97 WL	Nijel Amos (BOT) 1:43.63 WL, MR	Ayanleh Souleiman (DJI) 3:47.32 WL, DLR, MR, NR	Caleb Mwangangi Ndiku (KEN) 13:01.71 WL	Pascal Martinot-Lagarde (FRA) 13.13 WL	–	–
4	Rome	Justin Gatlin (USA) 9.91	Alonso Edward (PAN) 20.19	LaShawn Merritt (USA) 44.48	Mohammed Aman (ETH) 1:44.24	Silas Kiplagat (KEN) 3:30.44	–	–	–	Jairus Kipchoge Birech (KEN) 8:06.20 SB
5	Oslo	Richard Thompson (TTO) 10.02	–	–	–	Ayanleh Souleiman (DJI) 3:49.49	Yenew Alamirew (ETH) 13:01.57 WL	Pascal Martinot-Lagarde (FRA) 13.12 WL	Ashton Eaton (USA) 49.16	Jairus Kipchoge Birech (KEN) 8:02.37 WL
6	New York	Nesta Carter (JAM) 10.09	Warren Weir (JAM) 19.82 WL	LaShawn Merritt (USA) 44.19 MR	David Rudisha (KEN) 1:44.63	–	–	–	Javier Culson (PUR) 48.03 WL	–
7	Lausanne	Justin Gatlin (USA) 9.80 WL	Alonso Edward (PAN) 19.84 SB	Kirani James (GRN) 43.74 WL, DLR, NR	–	Ronald Kwemoi (KEN) 3:31.48 PB	–	Pascal Martinot-Lagarde (FRA) 13.06 PB	Javier Culson (PUR) 48.32	Jairus Kipchoge Birech (KEN) 8:03.34
8	Paris	Mike Rodgers (USA) 10.00	–	–	Asbel Kiprop (KEN) 1:43.34 WL	–	Edwin Soi (KEN) 12:59.82 WL	Hansle Parchment (JAM) 12.94 WL, NR	Michael Tinsley (USA) 48.25 SB	–
9	Glasgow	Nickel Ashmeade (JAM) 9.97 SB	Alonso Edward (PAN) 20.25	Isaac Makwala (BOT) 44.71	David Rudisha (KEN) 1:43.34 =WL	Silas Kiplagat (KEN) 3:32.84	Hagos Gebrhiwet (ETH) 13:11.09	William Sharman (GBR) 13.21 =PB	Javier Culson (PUR) 48.35	–
10	Monaco	–	Justin Gatlin (USA) 19.68 WL, MR	LaShawn Merritt (USA) 44.30	Nijel Amos (BOT) 1:42.45 WL, MR	Silas Kiplagat (KEN) 3:27.64 WL, DLR	–	Pascal Martinot-Lagarde (FRA) 12.95 NR	–	Jairus Kipchoge Birech (KEN) 8:03.33
11	Stockholm	Nesta Carter (JAM) 9.96 SB	–	–	Adam Kszczot (POL) 1:45.25	–	Muktar Edris (ETH) 12:54.83 WL	–	Michael Tinsley (USA) 49.60	–
12	Birmingham	Kemar Bailey-Cole (JAM) 10.08	Nickel Ashmeade (JAM) 20.33	Kirani James (GRN) 44.59	–	–	–	–	–	Jairus Kipchoge Birech (KEN) 8:07.80 MR
13	Zürich	Kemar Bailey-Cole (JAM) 9.96 SB	Alonso Edward (PAN) 19.95	LaShawn Merritt (USA) 44.36	Nijel Amos (BOT) 1:43.77	–	Caleb Mwangangi Ndiku (KEN) 13:07.01	–	Cornel Fredericks (RSA) 48.25	–
14	Brussels	Justin Gatlin (USA) 9.77 WL	Justin Gatlin (USA) 19.71	Renny Quow (TRI) 45.37	–	Taoufik Makhloufi (ALG) 3:31.78	–	Pascal Martinot-Lagarde (FRA) 13.08	–	Jairus Kipchoge Birech (KEN) 7:58.41 WL
Overall winner		Justin Gatlin (USA)	Alonso Edward (PAN)	LaShawn Merritt (USA)	Nijel Amos (BOT)	Silas Kiplagat (KEN)	Caleb Mwangangi Ndiku (KEN)	Pascal Martinot-Lagarde (FRA)	Michael Tinsley (USA)	Jairus Kipchoge Birech (KEN)

==== Field ====
#	Meeting	Long jump	Triple jump	High jump	Pole vault	Shot put	Discus	Javelin
1	Doha	Louis Tsatoumas (GRE) 8.06	–	Ivan Ukhov (RUS) 2.41 WL, =DLR, MR	–	–	Piotr Małachowski (POL) 66.72	–
2	Shanghai	–	Lazaro Martinez (CUB) 16.76	–	Renaud Lavillenie (FRA) 5.92 WL, MR	Christian Cantwell (USA) 21.73 MR	–	Ihab Abdelrahman (EGY) 89.21 AR, WL, MR
3	Eugene	–	Will Claye (USA) 17.66 MR	–	Renaud Lavillenie (FRA) 5.80	Reese Hoffa (USA) 21.64 SB	–	Vítězslav Veselý (CZE) 83.75
4	Rome	–	Will Claye (USA) 17.14	Mutaz Essa Barshim (QAT) 2.41 AR, =WL, =DLR	–	–	Robert Harting (GER) 68.36 SB	–
5	Oslo	–	Will Claye (USA) 17.41	–	Renaud Lavillenie (FRA) 5.77	Joe Kovacs (USA) 21.14	–	Tero Pitkämäki (FIN) 84.18 SB
6	New York	Jeff Henderson (USA) 8.33 MR	–	Bohdan Bondarenko (UKR) 2.42 AR WL MR	–	–	Robert Harting (GER) 68.24 MR	–
7	Lausanne	Jeff Henderson (USA) 8.31	–	Bohdan Bondarenko (UKR) 2.40	Renaud Lavillenie (FRA) 5.87	–	Piotr Małachowski (POL) 66.63	–
8	Paris	–	Benjamin Compaoré (FRA) 17.12 SB	–	Renaud Lavillenie (FRA) 5.70	David Storl (GER) 21.41	–	Ihab Abdelrahman (EGY) 87.10
9	Glasgow	Jeff Henderson (USA) 8.21	Christian Taylor (USA) 17.36	Wojciech Theiner (POL) 2.28	Paweł Wojciechowski (POL) 5.67	Reese Hoffa (USA) 21.67 SB	–	Thomas Röhler (GER) 86.99 PB
10	Monaco	Li Jinzhe (CHN) 8.09	–	Bohdan Bondarenko (UKR) 2.40 MR	–	–	Piotr Małachowski (POL) 65.84	–
11	Stockholm	Godfrey Khotso Mokoena (RSA) 8.09 SB	–	–	Konstadinos Filippidis (GRE) 5.60	Reese Hoffa (USA) 21.06	–	Antti Ruuskanen (FIN) 87.24
12	Birmingham	Christian Taylor (USA) 8.09 SB	–	Mutaz Essa Barshim (QAT) 2.38 MR	–	–	Robert Harting (GER) 67.57	–
13	Zürich	–	Christian Taylor (USA) 17.51 SB	–	–	Reese Hoffa (USA) 21.88 SB	–	Thomas Röhler (GER) 87.63 PB
14	Brussels	Godfrey Khotso Mokoena (RSA) 8.19 SB	–	Mutaz Essa Barshim (QAT) 2.43 AR, WL, DLR	Renaud Lavillenie (FRA) 5.93 WL	–	Robert Harting (GER) 67.57	–
Overall winner		Godfrey Khotso Mokoena (RSA)	Christian Taylor (USA)	Mutaz Essa Barshim (QAT)	Renaud Lavillenie (FRA)	Reese Hoffa (USA)	Piotr Małachowski (POL)	Thomas Röhler (GER)

=== Women ===
==== Track ====
#	Meeting	100 m	200 m	400 m	800 m	1500 m	5000 m	100 m h	400 m h	3000 m st
1	Doha	Shelly-Ann Fraser-Pryce (JAM) 11.13	–	–	Eunice Jepkoech Sum (KEN) 1:59.33	–	Hellen Obiri (KEN) 8:20.68 AR, DLR	–	Kemi Adekoya (BHR) 54.59 WL, NR	–
2	Shanghai	–	Blessing Okagbare (NGR) 22.36 MR	Novlene Williams-Mills (JAM) 50.31	–	Abeba Aregawi (SWE) 3:58.72 WL	–	–	–	Emma Coburn (USA) 9:19.80 WL
3	Eugene	–	Tori Bowie (USA) 22.18 WL	Novlene Williams-Mills (JAM) 50.40	–	Hellen Obiri (KEN) 3:57.05 WL, MR	–	–	Kaliese Spencer (JAM) 54.29 WL	Sofia Assefa (ETH) 9:11.39 WL, MR
4	Rome	Tori Bowie (USA) 11.05 PB	–	–	Eunice Jepkoech Sum (KEN) 1:59.49	–	Genzebe Dibaba (ETH) 14:34.99 WL	Brianna Rollins (USA) 12.53 WL	Kaliese Spencer (JAM) 53.97 WL	–
5	Oslo	Myriam Soumare (FRA) 11.18 SB	Allyson Felix (USA) 22.73	Novlene Williams-Mills (JAM) 50.06 SB	Eunice Jepkoech Sum (KEN) 1:59.02 SB	–	–	–	Kaliese Spencer (JAM) 54.94	–
6	New York	Tori Bowie (USA) 11.07	Tianna Bartoletta (USA) 22.68	Francena McCorory (USA) 50.15	Natoya Goule (JAM) 2:00.28	Abeba Aregawi (SWE) 4:00.13 MR	Mercy Cherono (KEN) 8:39.84	Queen Harrison (USA) 12.62	–	Sofia Assefa (ETH) 9:18.58 MR
7	Lausanne	Michelle-Lee Ahye (TTO) 10.98	–	–	Eunice Jepkoech Sum (KEN) 1:58.48 SB	–	Mercy Cherono (KEN) 8:50.24	–	–	–
8	Paris	–	Blessing Okagbare (NGR) 22.32	Sanya Richards-Ross (USA) 50.10	–	Sifan Hassan (NED) 3:57.00 WL, NR	–	Dawn Harper-Nelson (USA) 12.44 WL	–	Hiwot Ayalew (ETH) 9:11.65 MR
9	Glasgow	Michelle-Lee Ahye (TTO) 11.01	Dafne Schippers (NED) 22.34 NR	Francena McCorory (USA) 49.93	Ajeé Wilson (USA) 1:59.68	Sifan Hassan (NED) 4:00.67 MR	–	Queen Harrison (USA) 12.58	Eilidh Child (GBR) 54.39 SB	Hiwot Ayalew (ETH) 9:10.64 WL, MR
10	Monaco	Tori Bowie (USA) 10.80 WL, PB	–	–	Ajeé Wilson (USA) 1:57.67 WL, PB	–	Genzebe Dibaba (ETH) 14:28.88 WL, PB	–	Kaliese Spencer (JAM) 54.09	–
11	Stockholm	–	Allyson Felix (USA) 22.85	Novlene Williams-Mills (JAM) 50.09	–	Jennifer Simpson (USA) 4:00.38	–	Queen Harrison (USA) 12.66	–	Hiwot Ayalew (ETH) 9:17.04
12	Birmingham	Kerron Stewart (JAM) 11.22	–	–	Lynsey Sharp (GBR) 1:59.14	–	Mercy Cherono (KEN) 9:11.49	Dawn Harper-Nelson (USA) 12.66	Kaliese Spencer (JAM) 53.80	–
13	Zürich	Veronica Campbell Brown (JAM) 11.04	–	–	–	Jennifer Simpson (USA) 3:59.92	–	Dawn Harper-Nelson (USA) 12.58	–	Habiba Ghribi (TUN) 9:15.23
14	Brussels	–	Allyson Felix (USA) 22.02 WL	Sanya Richards-Ross (USA) 49.98	Brenda Martinez (USA) 1:58.84 SB	–	Mercy Cherono (KEN) 8:28.95	Kristi Castlin (USA) 12.76	Kaliese Spencer (JAM) 54.12	–
Overall winner		Veronica Campbell Brown (JAM)	Allyson Felix (USA)	Novlene Williams-Mills (JAM)	Eunice Jepkoech Sum (KEN)	Jennifer Simpson (USA)	Mercy Cherono (KEN)	Dawn Harper-Nelson (USA)	Kaliese Spencer (JAM)	Hiwot Ayalew (ETH)

- In Birmingham, a 2 miles race was counted to the Diamond League standings for the 5000 metres.
- In Doha, New York, Lausanne and Brussels, 3000 metres races were counted to the Diamond League standings for the 5000 metres.

==== Field ====
#	Meeting	Long jump	Triple jump	High jump	Pole vault	Shot put	Discus	Javelin
1	Doha	–	Caterine Ibargüen (COL) 14.43 WL, MR	–	Nikoleta Kyriakopoulou (GRE) 4.63	Valerie Adams (NZL) 20.20	–	Kimberley Mickle (AUS) 65.36
2	Shanghai	Blessing Okagbare (NGR) 6.86 WL	–	Ana Šimić (CRO) 1.97 WL	–	–	Sandra Perković (CRO) 70.52 WL, MR, NR	–
3	Eugene	Ivana Španović (SRB) 6.88 =WL, NR	–	Anna Chicherova (RUS) 2.01 WL	–	–	Sandra Perković (CRO) 69.32 MR	–
4	Rome	–	Caterine Ibargüen (COL) 14.48	–	Yarisley Silva (CUB) 4.70 WL	Valerie Adams (NZL) 20.01	–	Barbora Špotáková (CZE) 66.43
5	Oslo	Tianna Bartoletta (USA) 7.02 WL	–	Mariya Kuchina (RUS) 1.98 =PB	–	–	Sandra Perković (CRO) 67.17	–
6	New York	–	Kimberley Williams (JAM) 14.31 w	–	Fabiana Murer (BRA) 4.80 WL	Valerie Adams (NZL) 19.68	–	Linda Stahl (GER) 67.32 WL
7	Lausanne	–	Caterine Ibargüen (COL) 14.87 =WL	–	–	Valerie Adams (NZL) 20.42	–	Barbora Špotáková (CZE) 66.72 SB
8	Paris	Éloyse Lesueur (FRA) 6.92 PB	–	Blanka Vlašić (CRO) 2.00 SB	–	–	Sandra Perković (CRO) 68.48 MR	–
9	Glasgow	Tianna Bartoletta (USA) 6.98	–	Blanka Vlašić (CRO) 1.96	Fabiana Murer (BRA) 4.65	–	Gia Lewis-Smallwood (USA) 67.59 PB	–
10	Monaco	–	Caterine Ibargüen (COL) 15.31 AR, WL, DLR	–	Fabiana Murer (BRA) 4.76	Valerie Adams (NZL) 20.38	–	Barbora Špotáková (CZE) 66.96 SB
11	Stockholm	Tianna Bartoletta (USA) 6.98	–	Mariya Kuchina (RUS) 1.94	–	–	Sandra Perković (CRO) 66.74	–
12	Birmingham	–	Caterine Ibargüen (COL) 14.52	–	Katerina Stefanidi (GRE) 4.57	Valerie Adams (NZL) 19.96	–	Elizabeth Gleadle (CAN) 64.49
13	Zürich	Ivana Španović (SRB) 6.80	–	Mariya Kuchina (RUS) 2.00	Fabiana Murer (BRA) 4.72	–	Sandra Perković (CRO) 68.36	–
14	Brussels	–	Caterine Ibargüen (COL) 14.98	–	–	Valerie Adams (NZL) 20.59 WL, MR	–	Barbora Špotáková (CZE) 67.99 WL, SB
Overall winner		Tianna Bartoletta (USA)	Caterine Ibargüen (COL)	Mariya Kuchina (RUS)	Fabiana Murer (BRA)	Valerie Adams (NZL)	Sandra Perković (CRO)	Barbora Špotáková (CZE)

== Results ==
Doha
Event	1st +4 pts	2nd +2 pts	3rd +1 pts	4th ⠀	5th ⠀	6th ⠀	7th ⠀	8th ⠀
Men's 200m (-0.2 m/s)	Nickel Ashmeade; JAM | 20.13	Warren Weir; JAM | 20.31	Femi Ogunode; QAT | 20.38	Jaysuma Saidy Ndure; NOR | 20.43	Rasheed Dwyer; JAM | 20.48	Curtis Mitchell; USA | 20.76	Churandy Martina; NED | 20.86	Dontae Richards-Kwok; CAN | 21.30
Men's 400m	LaShawn Merritt; USA | 44.44	Youssef Ahmed Masrahi; KSA | 44.77	Pavel Maslák; CZE | 44.79	Tony McQuay; USA | 44.92	Luguelín Santos; DOM | 44.94	Kyle Clemons; USA | 45.50	Josh Mance; USA | 45.63	Edino Steele; JAM | 46.36
Men's 1500m	Asbel Kiprop; KEN | 3:29.18	Silas Kiplagat; KEN | 3:29.70	Ayanleh Souleiman; DJI | 3:30.16	Taoufik Makhloufi; ALG | 3:30.40	James Kiplagat Magut; KEN | 3:30.61	Aman Wote; ETH | 3:30.86	Bethwell Birgen; KEN | 3:31.22	Ilham Tanui Özbilen; TUR | 3:32.09
Men's 110mH (-0.5 m/s)	David Oliver; USA | 13.23	Sergey Shubenkov; RUS | 13.38	Pascal Martinot-Lagarde; FRA | 13.42	Jeff Porter; USA | 13.52	Ryan Wilson; USA | 13.52	Thomas Martinot-Lagarde; FRA | 13.67	Abdulaziz al Mandeel; KUW | 13.79	Tyron Akins; USA | 13.83
Men's 3000mSC	Ezekiel Kemboi; KEN | 8:04.12	Brimin Kiprop Kipruto; KEN | 8:04.64	Paul Kipsiele Koech; KEN | 8:05.47	Jairus Kipchoge Birech; KEN | 8:07.37	Hilal Yego; KEN | 8:09.07	Gilbert Kirui; KEN | 8:11.86	Abel Kiprop Mutai; KEN | 8:17.77	Bernard Nganga; KEN | 8:23.41
Men's High Jump	Ivan Ukhov; RUS | DQ (Note: Disqualified after competition due to antidoping rule violation)	Derek Drouin; CAN | 2.37 m	Erik Kynard; USA | 2.37 m	Mutaz Essa Barshim; QAT | 2.37 m	Andrii Protsenko; UKR | 2.27 m	Marco Fassinotti; ITA | 2.24 m	Jesse Williams; USA | 2.24 m	Donald Thomas; BAH | 2.24 m
Men's Long Jump	Louis Tsatoumas; GRE | 8.06 m	Luis Alberto Rivera Morales; MEX | 8.04 m	Ignisious Gaisah; NED | 8.01 m	Christian Taylor; USA | 7.95 m	Zarck Visser; RSA | 7.74 m	Godfrey Khotso Mokoena; RSA | 7.68 m	Damar Forbes; JAM | 7.67 m	Saleh Abdelaziz al Haddad; KUW | 7.56 m
Men's Discus Throw	Piotr Małachowski; POL | 66.72 m	Vikas Gowda; IND | 63.23 m	Gerd Kanter; EST | 62.90 m	Robert Urbanek; POL | 62.88 m	Frank Casanas; ESP | 62.75 m	Victor Hogan; RSA | 62.14 m	Ehsan Hadadi; IRI | 61.86 m	Erik Cadée; NED | 61.11 m
Women's 100m (-0.8 m/s)	Shelly-Ann Fraser-Pryce; JAM | 11.13	Blessing Okagbare; NGR | 11.18	Kerron Stewart; JAM | 11.25	Carrie Russell; JAM | 11.29	Alexandria Anderson; USA | 11.30	Verena Sailer; GER | 11.40	Barbara Pierre; USA | 11.44	English Gardner; USA | 11.57
Women's 800m	Eunice Jepkoech Sum; KEN | 1:59.33	Chanelle Price; USA | 1:59.75	Lenka Masná; CZE | 2:00.20	Janeth Jepkosgei; KEN | 2:00.49	Molly Ludlow; USA | 2:00.55	Tintu Luka; IND | 2:00.56	Jennifer Meadows; GBR | 2:00.91	Rose Mary Almanza; CUB | 2:00.91
Women's 3000m	Hellen Obiri; KEN | 8:20.68	Mercy Cherono; KEN | 8:21.14	Faith Kipyegon; KEN | 8:23.55	Viola Jelagat Kibiwot; KEN | 8:24.41	Almaz Ayana; ETH | 8:24.58	Genzebe Dibaba; ETH | 8:26.21	Irene Jelagat; KEN | 8:28.51	Mimi Belete; BRN | 8:30.00
Women's 400mH	Kemi Adekoya; BRN | 54.59	Kaliese Carter; JAM | 55.07	Eilidh Doyle; GBR | 55.43	Lashinda Demus; USA | 55.67	Georganne Moline; USA | 55.90	Anna Ryzhykova; UKR | 57.02	Hanna Titimets; UKR | DQ	Dalilah Muhammad; USA | 58.02
Women's Pole Vault	Nikoleta Kyriakopoulou; GRE | 4.63 m	Yarisley Silva; CUB | 4.53 m	Kristina Gadschiew; GER | 4.43 m	Anastasiya Savchenko; RUS | 4.43 m	Nicole Büchler; SUI | 4.43 m	Silke Spiegelburg; GER | 4.43 m	Alana Boyd; AUS | 4.23 m	Becky Holliday Ward; USA | NH m
Women's Triple Jump	Caterine Ibarguen; COL | 14.43 m	Olha Saladukha; UKR | 14.32 m	Kimberly Williams; JAM | 14.15 m	Mabel Gay; CUB | 14.09 m	Patrícia Mamona; POR | 13.96 m	Dana Velďáková; SVK | 13.90 m	Snežana Vukmirovič; SLO | 13.73 m	Keila Costa; BRA | 13.61 m
Women's Shot Put	Valerie Adams; NZL | 20.20 m	Yuliya Leantsiuk; BLR | 18.78 m	Anita Márton; HUN | 18.32 m	Tia Brooks-Wannemacher; USA | 18.06 m	Alena Abramchuk; BLR | 17.69 m	Melissa Boekelman; NED | 17.51 m	Shanice Craft; GER | 17.47 m	Jessica Cérival; FRA | 16.97 m
Women's Javelin Throw	Martina Ratej; SLO | DQ	Kimberley Mickle; AUS | 65.36 m	Sunette Viljoen; RSA | 64.23 m	Madara Palameika; LAT | 61.17 m	Linda Stahl; GER | 60.95 m	Kara Winger; USA | 59.97 m	Sofi Flink; SWE | 58.34 m	Nikola Ogrodníková; CZE | 58.16 m

Shanghai
Event	1st +4 pts	2nd +2 pts	3rd +1 pts	4th ⠀	5th ⠀	6th ⠀	7th ⠀	8th ⠀
Men's 100m (0.0 m/s)	Justin Gatlin; USA | 9.92	Nesta Carter; JAM | 10.12	Michael Rodgers; USA | 10.18	Bingtian Su; CHN | 10.20	Kim Collins; SKN | 10.25	Wilfried Koffi Hua; CIV | 10.27	Dwain Chambers; GBR | 10.28	Charles Silmon; USA | 10.43
Men's 800m	Robert Biwott; KEN | 1:44.69	Taoufik Makhloufi; ALG | 1:44.73	André Olivier; RSA | 1:44.85	Jeremiah Kipkorir Mutai; KEN | 1:44.85	Marcin Lewandowski; POL | 1:45.92	Ronald Musagala; UGA | 1:46.54	Brandon Johnson; USA | 1:46.67	Haining Teng; CHN | 1:46.77
Men's 5000m	Yenew Alamirew; ETH | 13:04.83	Thomas Pkemei Longosiwa; KEN | 13:05.44	Hagos Gebrhiwet; ETH | 13:06.88	John Kipkoech; KEN | 13:08.23	Edwin Cheruiyot Soi; KEN | 13:08.79	Birhanu Legese; ETH | 13:08.88	Albert Rop; BRN | 13:10.38	Cornelius Kangogo; KEN | 13:11.14
Men's 110mH (-0.3 m/s)	Wenjun Xie; CHN | 13.23	Pascal Martinot-Lagarde; FRA | 13.26	David Oliver; USA | 13.28	Sergey Shubenkov; RUS | 13.30	Ryan Wilson; USA | 13.44	Dayron Robles; CUB | 13.48	Ryan Brathwaite; BAR | 13.64	Mikel Thomas; TTO | 13.64
Men's 400mH	Michael Tinsley; USA | 48.77	Mamadou Kasse Hann; SEN | 48.86	Bershawn Jackson; USA | 48.92	LJ van Zyl; RSA | 48.97	Jeffery Gibson; BAH | 49.45	Jehue Gordon; TTO | 49.56	Mahau Suguimati; BRA | 50.18	Johnny Dutch; USA | 50.47
Men's Pole Vault	Renaud Lavillenie; FRA | 5.92 m	Konstantinos Filippidis; GRE | 5.62 m	Changrui Xue; CHN | 5.62 m	Daichi Sawano; JPN | 5.62 m	Seito Yamamoto; JPN | 5.62 m	Malte Mohr; GER | 5.52 m	Raphael Holzdeppe; GER | 5.52 m	Steven Lewis; GBR | 5.52 m
Men's Triple Jump	Lyukman Adams; RUS | DQ	Lázaro Martínez; CUB | 16.76 m	Bin Dong; CHN | 16.69 m	Christian Taylor; USA | 16.65 m	Chris Carter; USA | 16.51 m	Phillips Idowu; GBR | 16.47 m	Renjith Maheswary; IND | 16.16 m	Samyr Laine; HAI | 16.10 m
Men's Shot Put	Christian Cantwell; USA | 21.73 m	Joe Kovacs; USA | 21.52 m	Ryan Whiting; USA | 21.31 m	David Storl; GER | 21.09 m	Tomasz Majewski; POL | 20.93 m	Kurt Roberts; USA | 20.60 m	Cory Martin; USA | 20.11 m	Georgi Ivanov; BUL | 20.06 m
Men's Javelin Throw	Ihab Abdelrahman; EGY | 89.21 m	Kim Amb; SWE | 84.14 m	Vítězslav Veselý; CZE | 83.80 m	Julius Yego; KEN | 83.00 m	Dmitriy Tarabin; RUS | 82.66 m	Tero Pitkämäki; FIN | 81.38 m	Keshorn Walcott; TTO | 81.09 m	Antti Ruuskanen; FIN | 78.83 m
Women's 200m (0.0 m/s)	Blessing Okagbare; NGR | 22.36	Anthonique Strachan; BAH | 22.50	Kimberlyn Duncan; USA | 22.96	Tiffany Townsend; USA | 23.01	Veronica Campbell-Brown; JAM | 23.08	Anneisha McLaughlin-Whilby; JAM | 23.33	English Gardner; USA | 23.37	Yongli Wei; CHN | 23.46
Women's 400m	Novlene Williams-Mills; JAM | 50.31	Amantle Montsho; BOT | 50.37	Stephenie Ann McPherson; JAM | 50.54	Francena McCorory; USA | 50.57	Allyson Felix; USA | 50.81	Natasha Hastings; USA | 50.91	Kaliese Carter; JAM | 51.00	Regina George; NGR | 51.39
Women's 1500m	Abeba Aregawi; SWE | 3:58.72	Jenny Simpson; USA | 4:00.42	Sifan Hassan; NED | 4:01.19	Viola Jelagat Kibiwot; KEN | 4:01.31	Mimi Belete; BRN | 4:01.98	Rababe Arafi; MAR | 4:02.86	Gudaf Tsegay; ETH | 4:05.13	Treniere Moser; USA | 4:06.38
Women's 3000mSC	Emma Coburn; USA | 9:19.80	Sofia Assefa; ETH | 9:25.76	Hiwot Ayalew; ETH | 9:27.25	Purity Kirui; KEN | 9:33.24	Salima el Ouali Alami; MAR | 9:34.23	Birtukan Adamu; ETH | 9:35.51	Etenesh Diro; ETH | 9:36.45	Milcah Chemos; KEN | 9:38.21
Women's High Jump	Ana Šimić; CRO | 1.97 m	Inika McPherson; USA | 1.92 m	Ruth Beitia; ESP | 1.92 m	Svetlana Radzivil; UZB | 1.92 m	Justyna Kasprzycka; POL | 1.89 m	Levern Spencer; LCA | 1.85 m	Nadiya Dusanova; UZB | 1.85 m	Xingjuan Zheng; CHN | 1.85 m
Women's Long Jump	Blessing Okagbare; NGR | 6.86 m	Ivana Vuleta; SRB | 6.85 m	Sosthene Moguenara-Taroum; GER | 6.79 m	Erica Jarder; SWE | 6.66 m	Darya Klishina; RUS | 6.62 m	Olga Kucherenko; RUS | DQ	Funmi Jimoh; USA | 6.56 m	Tori Polk; USA | 6.55 m
Women's Discus Throw	Sandra Perković; CRO | 70.52 m	Dani Stevens; AUS | 67.89 m	Melina Robert-Michon; FRA | 62.66 m	Yaimé Pérez; CUB | 61.22 m	Rocío Barbara Comba; ARG | 60.36 m	Gia Lewis-Smallwood; USA | 59.24 m	Yanbo Yang; CHN | 59.11 m	Siyu Gu; CHN | 58.81 m

Eugene
Event	1st +4 pts	2nd +2 pts	3rd +1 pts	4th ⠀	5th ⠀	6th ⠀	7th ⠀	8th ⠀
Men's 100m (+2.7 m/s)	Justin Gatlin; USA | 9.76	Michael Rodgers; USA | 9.80	Jimmy Vicaut; FRA | 9.89	Nesta Carter; JAM | 9.89	Nickel Ashmeade; JAM | 9.95	Maurice Mitchell; USA | 10.04	Peimeng Zhang; CHN | 10.08	Simon Magakwe; RSA | 10.13
Men's 800m	Nijel Amos; BOT | 1:43.63	Mohammed Aman; ETH | 1:43.99	Abubaker Kaki; SUD | 1:44.09	Pierre-Ambroise Bosse; FRA | 1:44.44	Adam Kszczot; POL | 1:44.65	Marcin Lewandowski; POL | 1:44.79	David Rudisha; KEN | 1:44.87	Andrew Osagie; GBR | 1:45.37
Men's 5000m	Caleb Mwangangi Ndiku; KEN | 13:01.71	Yenew Alamirew; ETH | 13:02.91	Edwin Cheruiyot Soi; KEN | 13:04.92	Albert Rop; BRN | 13:06.12	Isiah Kiplangat Koech; KEN | 13:07.55	John Kipkoech; KEN | 13:11.02	Hagos Gebrhiwet; ETH | 13:13.19	Augustine Kiprono Choge; KEN | 13:14.23
Men's 110mH (+0.8 m/s)	Pascal Martinot-Lagarde; FRA | 13.13	Hansle Parchment; JAM | 13.20	David Oliver; USA | 13.21	Ryan Wilson; USA | 13.25	Sergey Shubenkov; RUS | 13.29	Ashton Eaton; USA | 13.35	Jeff Porter; USA | 13.43	Jason Richardson; USA | 13.64
Men's Pole Vault	Renaud Lavillenie; FRA | 5.80 m	Augusto Dutra; BRA | 5.63 m	Jan Kudlička; CZE | 5.63 m	Raphael Holzdeppe; GER | 5.53 m	Brad Walker; USA | 5.53 m	Konstantinos Filippidis; GRE | 5.53 m	Thiago Braz; BRA | 5.43 m	Malte Mohr; GER | 5.43 m
Men's Triple Jump	Will Claye; USA | 17.66 m	Christian Taylor; USA | 17.42 m	Lyukman Adams; RUS | DQ	Ernesto Revé; CUB | 17.06 m	Aleksey Fyodorov; RUS | 16.72 m	Chris Carter; USA | 16.71 m	Bin Dong; CHN | 16.65 m	Benjamin Compaoré; FRA | 16.57 m
Men's Shot Put	Reese Hoffa; USA | 21.64 m	Joe Kovacs; USA | 21.46 m	Christian Cantwell; USA | 21.38 m	Kurt Roberts; USA | 20.71 m	Tomasz Majewski; POL | 20.59 m	Tom Walsh; NZL | 20.51 m	Germán Luján Lauro; ARG | 20.09 m	Ladislav Prášil; CZE | 18.92 m
Men's Javelin Throw	Vítězslav Veselý; CZE | 83.75 m	Andreas Thorkildsen; NOR | 80.52 m	Dmitriy Tarabin; RUS | 80.28 m	Petr Frydrych; CZE | 78.86 m	Thomas Röhler; GER | 78.63 m	Kim Amb; SWE | 77.36 m	Keshorn Walcott; TTO | 75.50 m	Sam Humphreys; USA | 73.60 m
Women's 200m (+1.5 m/s)	Tori Bowie; USA | 22.18	Blessing Okagbare; NGR | 22.23	Allyson Felix; USA | 22.44	Murielle Ahouré-Demps; CIV | 22.61	Kimberlyn Duncan; USA | 22.66	English Gardner; USA | 22.81	Jeneba Tarmoh; USA | 22.88	Shelly-Ann Fraser-Pryce; JAM | 23.06
Women's 400m	Novlene Williams-Mills; JAM | 50.40	Francena McCorory; USA | 50.53	Stephenie Ann McPherson; JAM | 50.63	Natasha Hastings; USA | 50.67	Amantle Montsho; BOT | 50.73	Sanya Richards-Ross; USA | 51.19	Joanna Atkins; USA | 51.48	Libania Grenot; ITA | 51.83
Women's 1500m	Hellen Obiri; KEN | 3:57.05	Abeba Aregawi; SWE | 3:57.57	Faith Kipyegon; KEN | 3:58.01	Jenny Simpson; USA | 3:58.28	Sifan Hassan; NED | 3:59.38	Eunice Jepkoech Sum; KEN | 4:01.54	Brenda Martinez; USA | 4:02.52	Laura Weightman; GBR | 4:02.72
Women's 400mH	Kaliese Carter; JAM | 54.29	Kori Carter; USA | 55.22	Tiffany Williams; USA | 55.97	Shevon Stoddart; JAM | 56.15	Denisa Rosolová; CZE | 56.45	Yadisleidis Pedroso; ITA | 56.66	Dalilah Muhammad; USA | 58.89	Georganne Moline; USA | 1:00.86
Women's 3000mSC	Sofia Assefa; ETH | 9:11.39	Hiwot Ayalew; ETH | 9:12.89	Emma Coburn; USA | 9:17.84	Etenesh Diro; ETH | 9:25.69	Purity Kirui; KEN | 9:29.18	Lidya Chepkurui; KEN | 9:32.03	Fancy Cherotich; KEN | 9:41.02	Gesa Felicitas Krause; GER | 9:42.95
Women's High Jump	Anna Chicherova; RUS | 2.01 m	Justyna Kasprzycka; POL | 1.99 m	Ruth Beitia; ESP | 1.99 m	Mariya Lasitskene; RUS | 1.97 m	Ana Šimić; CRO | 1.95 m	Irina Gordeyeva; RUS | 1.95 m	Kamila Lićwinko; POL | 1.95 m	Brigetta Barrett; USA | 1.88 m
Women's Long Jump	Ivana Vuleta; SRB | 6.88 m	Darya Klishina; RUS | 6.88 m	Éloyse Lesueur-Aymonin; FRA | 6.87 m	Brittney Reese; USA | 6.86 m	Tori Bowie; USA | 6.82 m	Shara Proctor; GBR | 6.60 m	Janay Deloach; USA | 6.41 m	Shara Proctor; GBR | 6.58 m
Women's Discus Throw	Sandra Perković; CRO | 69.32 m	Shanice Craft; GER | 65.38 m	Gia Lewis-Smallwood; USA | 64.98 m	Nadine Müller; GER | 64.37 m	Melina Robert-Michon; FRA | 63.65 m	Julia Harting; GER | 63.55 m	Yaimé Pérez; CUB | 62.04 m	Żaneta Glanc; POL | 60.33 m

Rome
Event	1st +4 pts	2nd +2 pts	3rd +1 pts	4th ⠀	5th ⠀	6th ⠀	7th ⠀	8th ⠀
Men's 200m (+0.9 m/s)	Alonso Edward; PAN | 20.19	Christophe Lemaitre; FRA | 20.24	Curtis Mitchell; USA | 20.46	Julian Forte; JAM | 20.49	Rasheed Dwyer; JAM | 20.51	Churandy Martina; NED | 20.74	Andrew Howe; ITA | 20.81	Brandon Byram; USA | 20.81
Men's 400m	LaShawn Merritt; USA | 44.48	Youssef Ahmed Masrahi; KSA | 45.14	David Verburg; USA | 45.18	Isaac Makwala; BOT | 45.22	Luguelín Santos; DOM | 45.27	Josh Mance; USA | 45.29	Nigel Levine; GBR | 45.86	Conrad Williams; GBR | 46.29
Men's 1500m	Silas Kiplagat; KEN | 3:30.44	Ayanleh Souleiman; DJI | 3:31.19	Asbel Kiprop; KEN | 3:31.89	Homiyu Tesfaye; GER | 3:31.98	Abdelaati Iguider; MAR | 3:32.09	Collins Cheboi; KEN | 3:32.35	Aman Wote; ETH | 3:33.96	Johan Cronje; RSA | 3:34.90
Men's 3000mSC	Jairus Kipchoge Birech; KEN | 8:06.20	Paul Kipsiele Koech; KEN | 8:10.53	Brimin Kiprop Kipruto; KEN | 8:11.39	Abel Kiprop Mutai; KEN | 8:15.83	Krystian Zalewski; POL | 8:16.20	Clement Kimutai Kemboi; KEN | 8:16.96	Víctor García; ESP | 8:17.40	Hamid Ezzine; MAR | 8:18.03
Men's High Jump	Mutaz Essa Barshim; QAT | 2.41 m	Bohdan Bondarenko; UKR | 2.34 m	Erik Kynard; USA | 2.31 m	Derek Drouin; CAN | 2.28 m	Ivan Ukhov; RUS | DQ	Andrey Silnov; RUS | DQ	Andrii Protsenko; UKR | 2.28 m	Daniil Tsyplakov; RUS | 2.28 m
Men's Triple Jump	Will Claye; USA | 17.14 m	Christian Taylor; USA | 17.11 m	Lázaro Martínez; CUB | 17.07 m	Fabrizio Donato; ITA | 16.89 m	Aleksey Fyodorov; RUS | 16.86 m	Ernesto Revé; CUB | 16.86 m	Daniele Greco; ITA | 16.84 m	Karol Hoffmann; POL | 16.51 m
Men's Discus Throw	Robert Harting; GER | 68.36 m	Piotr Małachowski; POL | 65.86 m	Viktor Butenko; RUS | 64.87 m	Martin Wierig; GER | 64.64 m	Robert Urbanek; POL | 63.70 m	Gerd Kanter; EST | 63.38 m	Vikas Gowda; IND | 62.42 m	Daniel Ståhl; SWE | 62.05 m
Women's 100m (+0.5 m/s)	Tori Bowie; USA | 11.05	Kerron Stewart; JAM | 11.08	Simone Facey; JAM | 11.13	Tianna Madison; USA | 11.13	Jeneba Tarmoh; USA | 11.13	Alexandria Anderson; USA | 11.14	Murielle Ahouré-Demps; CIV | 11.18	Shelly-Ann Fraser-Pryce; JAM | 11.19
Women's 800m	Eunice Jepkoech Sum; KEN | 1:59.49	Sahily Diago Mesa; CUB | 2:00.01	Ajee Wilson; USA | 2:00.18	Angelika Cichocka; POL | 2:00.30	Brenda Martinez; USA | 2:00.44	Malika Akkaoui; MAR | 2:00.58	Marina Arzamasova; BLR | 2:00.72	Rose Mary Almanza; CUB | 2:00.74
Women's 5000m	Genzebe Dibaba; ETH | 14:34.99	Almaz Ayana; ETH | 14:37.16	Viola Jelagat Kibiwot; KEN | 14:40.05	Mercy Cherono; KEN | 14:43.11	Janet Kisa; KEN | 14:52.59	Alemitu Haroye; ETH | 14:52.67	Molly Huddle; USA | 14:55.90	Agnes Jebet Tirop; KEN | 15:00.19
Women's 100mH (+0.5 m/s)	Brianna McNeal; USA | 12.53	Dawn Harper-Nelson; USA | 12.54	Queen Claye; USA | 12.61	Cindy Billaud; FRA | 12.69	Tiffany Porter; GBR | 12.90	Nia Ali; USA | 13.26	Veronica Borsi; ITA | 13.34	Marzia Caravelli; ITA | DNF
Women's 400mH	Kaliese Carter; JAM | 53.97	Georganne Moline; USA | 54.56	Eilidh Doyle; GBR | 54.82	Tiffany Williams; USA | 55.59	Shevon Stoddart; JAM | 55.98	Denisa Rosolová; CZE | 56.00	Hanna Titimets; UKR | DQ	Yadisleidis Pedroso; ITA | 56.71
Women's Pole Vault	Yarisley Silva; CUB | 4.70 m	Lisa Ryzih; GER | 4.60 m	Silke Spiegelburg; GER | 4.50 m	Hanna Shelekh; UKR | 4.50 m	Anna Rogowska; POL | 4.50 m	Fabiana Murer; BRA | 4.50 m	Angelina Zhuk-Krasnova; RUS | 4.50 m	Anastasiya Savchenko; RUS | 4.40 m
Women's Triple Jump	Caterine Ibarguen; COL | 14.48 m	Yekaterina Koneva; RUS | 14.42 m	Mabel Gay; CUB | 14.38 m	Olha Saladukha; UKR | 14.24 m	Anna Pyatykh; RUS | DQ	Patrícia Mamona; POR | 13.92 m	Snežana Vukmirovič; SLO | 13.90 m	Irina Gumenyuk; RUS | 13.83 m
Women's Shot Put	Valerie Adams; NZL | 20.01 m	Christina Schwanitz; GER | 19.60 m	Lijiao Gong; CHN | 19.17 m	Yevgeniya Kolodko; RUS | DQ	Alena Abramchuk; BLR | 18.65 m	Michelle Carter; USA | 18.58 m	Yuliya Leantsiuk; BLR | 18.53 m	Halyna Obleshchuk; UKR | 18.17 m
Women's Javelin Throw	Barbora Špotáková; CZE | 66.43 m	Martina Ratej; SLO | DQ	Kimberley Mickle; AUS | 63.05 m	Li Lingyu; CHN | 62.30 m	Hanna Hatsko; UKR | 62.18 m	Madara Palameika; LAT | 59.94 m	Linda Stahl; GER | 59.16 m	Vera Markaryan; RUS | 58.94 m

Oslo
Event	1st +4 pts	2nd +2 pts	3rd +1 pts	4th ⠀	5th ⠀	6th ⠀	7th ⠀	8th ⠀
Men's 100m (-0.6 m/s)	Richard Thompson; TTO | 10.02	Jimmy Vicaut; FRA | 10.04	Adam Gemili; GBR | 10.11	Kim Collins; SKN | 10.13	Jaysuma Saidy Ndure; NOR | 10.19	Simon Magakwe; RSA | 10.28	Richard Kilty; GBR | 10.29	Daniel Talbot; GBR | 10.31
Men's Mile	Ayanleh Souleiman; DJI | 3:49.49	Nick Willis; NZL | 3:49.83	Homiyu Tesfaye; GER | 3:49.86	Henrik Ingebrigtsen; NOR | 3:50.72	Mahiedine Mekhissi; FRA | 3:51.55	Mekonnen Gebremedhin; ETH | 3:51.59	Ilham Tanui Özbilen; TUR | 3:51.71	Matthew Centrowitz Jr. USA | 3:52.23
Men's 5000m	Yenew Alamirew; ETH | 13:01.57	Caleb Mwangangi Ndiku; KEN | 13:02.15	Galen Rupp; USA | 13:03.35	Thomas Pkemei Longosiwa; KEN | 13:04.68	Edwin Cheruiyot Soi; KEN | 13:08.36	Isiah Kiplangat Koech; KEN | 13:08.46	Dejen Gebremeskel; ETH | 13:09.73	Cornelius Kangogo; KEN | 13:13.03
Men's 110mH (-0.6 m/s)	Pascal Martinot-Lagarde; FRA | 13.12	Andrew Riley; JAM | 13.36	Sergey Shubenkov; RUS | 13.37	William Sharman; GBR | 13.38	Hansle Parchment; JAM | 13.39	Jason Richardson; USA | 13.45	Ryan Wilson; USA | 13.54	Vladimir Vukicevic; NOR | 13.94
Men's 3000mSC	Jairus Kipchoge Birech; KEN | 8:02.37	Evan Jager; USA | 8:06.97	Hilal Yego; KEN | 8:10.93	Paul Kipsiele Koech; KEN | 8:14.29	Gilbert Kirui; KEN | 8:15.32	Brahim Taleb; MAR | 8:15.48	Daniel Huling; USA | 8:15.87	Bernard Nganga; KEN | 8:18.22
Men's Pole Vault	Renaud Lavillenie; FRA | 5.77 m	Malte Mohr; GER | 5.70 m	Konstantinos Filippidis; GRE | 5.60 m	Thiago Braz; BRA | 5.47 m	Dmitriy Starodubtsev; RUS | DQ	Jan Kudlička; CZE | 5.32 m	Augusto Dutra; BRA | 5.32 m	Lázaro Borges; CUB | 5.32 m
Men's Triple Jump	Will Claye; USA | 17.41 m	Christian Taylor; USA | 17.15 m	Ernesto Revé; CUB | 16.96 m	Lázaro Martínez; CUB | 16.82 m	Lyukman Adams; RUS | DQ	Omar Craddock; USA | 16.67 m	Godfrey Khotso Mokoena; RSA | 16.38 m	Phillips Idowu; GBR | 16.30 m
Men's Shot Put	Joe Kovacs; USA | 21.14 m	David Storl; GER | 21.08 m	Reese Hoffa; USA | 21.07 m	Germán Luján Lauro; ARG | 20.60 m	Tomasz Majewski; POL | 20.22 m	Ladislav Prášil; CZE | 20.14 m	Christian Cantwell; USA | 19.47 m	Stian Andersen; NOR | 16.87 m
Men's Javelin Throw	Tero Pitkämäki; FIN | 84.18 m	Julius Yego; KEN | 84.17 m	Vítězslav Veselý; CZE | 83.53 m	Antti Ruuskanen; FIN | 82.56 m	Thomas Röhler; GER | 81.41 m	Kim Amb; SWE | 80.78 m	Ihab Abdelrahman; EGY | 80.06 m	Ari Mannio; FIN | 78.45 m
Women's 200m (-0.6 m/s)	Allyson Felix; USA | 22.73	Jodie Williams; GBR | 22.97	Myriam Soumaré; FRA | 22.98	Jeneba Tarmoh; USA | 22.98	Murielle Ahouré-Demps; CIV | 22.99	Ivet Lalova-Collio; BUL | 23.20	Barbara Pierre; USA | 23.67	Irene Ekelund; SWE | 23.74
Women's 400m	Novlene Williams-Mills; JAM | 50.06	Natasha Hastings; USA | 50.60	Amantle Montsho; BOT | 51.05	Libania Grenot; ITA | 51.79	Patricia Hall; JAM | 52.00	Marie Gayot; FRA | 52.30	Emily Diamond; GBR | 52.58	Line Kloster; NOR | 53.62
Women's 800m	Eunice Jepkoech Sum; KEN | 1:59.02	Ajee Wilson; USA | 1:59.68	Jessica Warner-Judd; GBR | 1:59.77	Janeth Jepkosgei; KEN | 2:00.20	Angelika Cichocka; POL | 2:00.43	Molly Ludlow; USA | 2:00.79	Agatha Jeruto; KEN | 2:00.95	Melissa Bishop-Nriagu; CAN | 2:01.06
Women's 400mH	Kaliese Carter; JAM | 54.94	Kemi Adekoya; BRN | 54.96	Eilidh Doyle; GBR | 55.33	Tiffany Williams; USA | 55.61	Shevon Stoddart; JAM | 56.71	Hanna Titimets; UKR | DQ	Natalya Antyukh; RUS | DQ	
Women's High Jump	Mariya Lasitskene; RUS | 1.98 m	Blanka Vlašić; CRO | 1.98 m	Ana Šimić; CRO | 1.95 m	Anna Chicherova; RUS | 1.90 m	Tonje Angelsen; NOR | 1.90 m	Irina Gordeyeva; RUS | 1.90 m	Justyna Kasprzycka; POL | 1.90 m	Kamila Lićwinko; POL | 1.90 m
Women's Long Jump	Tianna Madison; USA | 7.02 m	Shara Proctor; GBR | 6.78 m	Funmi Jimoh; USA | 6.71 m	Darya Klishina; RUS | 6.67 m	Ivana Vuleta; SRB | 6.67 m	Olga Kucherenko; RUS | DQ	Erica Jarder; SWE | 6.44 m	Sosthene Moguenara-Taroum; GER | 6.37 m
Women's Discus Throw	Sandra Perković; CRO | 67.17 m	Gia Lewis-Smallwood; USA | 65.77 m	Denia Caballero; CUB | 64.89 m	Yaimé Pérez; CUB | 63.21 m	Melina Robert-Michon; FRA | 63.08 m	Nadine Müller; GER | 62.73 m	Zinaida Sendriutė; LTU | 61.91 m	Żaneta Glanc; POL | 59.31 m

New
Event	1st ⠀	2nd ⠀	3rd ⠀	4th ⠀	5th ⠀	6th ⠀	7th ⠀	8th ⠀
Men's 200m (-0.2 m/s)	Warren Weir; JAM | 19.82	Nickel Ashmeade; JAM | 19.95	Alonso Edward; PAN | 20.06	Wallace Spearmon; USA | 20.19	Curtis Mitchell; USA | 20.29	Rasheed Dwyer; JAM | 20.44	James Ellington; GBR | 20.57	Shota Iizuka; JPN | 21.04
Men's 400m	LaShawn Merritt; USA | 44.19	Wayde van Niekerk; RSA | 44.38	Christopher Brown; BAH | 44.61	David Verburg; USA | 45.09	Tony McQuay; USA | 45.32	Luguelín Santos; DOM | 45.32	Youssef Ahmed Masrahi; KSA | 45.57	Lalonde Gordon; TTO | 45.68
Men's 800m	David Rudisha; KEN | 1:44.63	Mark English; IRL | 1:45.03	Duane Solomon; USA | 1:45.13	Marcin Lewandowski; POL | 1:45.23	Adam Kszczot; POL | 1:45.37	Wesley Vázquez; PUR | 1:45.79	Ferguson Cheruiyot Rotich; KEN | 1:45.90	Robby Andrews; USA | 1:46.28
Men's 400mH	Javier Culson; PUR | 48.03	Michael Tinsley; USA | 48.56	Cornel Fredericks; RSA | 48.58	Félix Sánchez; DOM | 49.09	LJ van Zyl; RSA | 49.37	Bershawn Jackson; USA | 49.67	Jehue Gordon; TTO | 49.81	Leford Green; JAM | 50.87
Men's High Jump	Bohdan Bondarenko; UKR | 2.42 m	Mutaz Essa Barshim; QAT | 2.42 m	Andrii Protsenko; UKR | 2.35 m	Erik Kynard; USA | 2.32 m	Jesse Williams; USA | 2.29 m	Marco Fassinotti; ITA | 2.25 m	Michael Mason; CAN | 2.20 m	
Men's Long Jump	Jeff Henderson; USA | 8.33 m	Christian Taylor; USA | 8.06 m	Ruswahl Samaai; RSA | 8.00 m	Jinzhe Li; CHN | 7.95 m	Louis Tsatoumas; GRE | 7.82 m	Michel Tornéus; SWE | 7.78 m	Ignisious Gaisah; NED | 7.72 m	Luis Alberto Rivera Morales; MEX | 7.70 m
Men's Discus Throw	Robert Harting; GER | 68.24 m	Piotr Małachowski; POL | 65.45 m	Ehsan Hadadi; IRI | 65.23 m	Robert Urbanek; POL | 64.84 m	Victor Hogan; RSA | 63.47 m	Benn Harradine; AUS | 62.55 m	Martin Wierig; GER | 62.13 m	Vikas Gowda; IND | 61.49 m
Women's 100m (-0.1 m/s)	Tori Bowie; USA | 11.07	Samantha Henry-Robinson; JAM | 11.13	Schillonie Calvert-Powell; JAM | 11.15	Kerron Stewart; JAM | 11.17	Alexandria Anderson; USA | 11.22	English Gardner; USA | 11.25	Carrie Russell; JAM | 11.27	Octavious Freeman; USA | 11.35
Women's 1500m	Abeba Aregawi; SWE | 4:00.13	Dawit Seyaum; ETH | 4:00.66	Jenny Simpson; USA | 4:02.54	Shannon Rowbury; USA | 4:03.36	Irene Jelagat; KEN | 4:04.07	Treniere Moser; USA | 4:04.33	Morgan Uceny; USA | 4:04.87	Brenda Martinez; USA | 4:06.42
Women's 3000m	Mercy Cherono; KEN | 8:39.84	Betsy Saina; KEN | 8:40.65	Kalkidan Gezahegne; BRN | 8:42.54	Sally Kipyego; KEN | 8:43.43	Kim Conley; USA | 8:44.11	Julia Bleasdale; GBR | 8:48.90	Buze Diriba; ETH | 8:51.46	Nikki Hamblin; NZL | 8:51.48
Women's 100mH (-2.1 m/s)	Queen Claye; USA | 12.62	Dawn Harper-Nelson; USA | 12.63	Lolo Jones; USA | 12.77	Cindy Billaud; FRA | 12.85	Tiffany Porter; GBR | 12.89	Nia Ali; USA | 13.03	Shermaine Williams; JAM | 13.09	Angela Whyte; CAN | 13.15
Women's 3000mSC	Sofia Assefa; ETH | 9:18.58	Purity Kirui; KEN | 9:23.43	Lidya Chepkurui; KEN | 9:27.42	Stephanie Garcia; USA | 9:28.96	Fancy Cherotich; KEN | 9:46.88	Beverly Ramos; PUR | 9:47.60	Rolanda Bell; PAN | 10:10.66	Maria Cristina Mancebo; DOM | 10:25.98
Women's Pole Vault	Fabiana Murer; BRA | 4.80 m	Jennifer Suhr; USA | 4.70 m	Yarisley Silva; CUB | 4.70 m	Aikaterini Stefanidi; GRE | 4.60 m	Anna Rogowska; POL | 4.50 m	Kylie Hutson; USA | 4.25 m	Elizaveta Parnova; AUS | 4.25 m	Mary Saxer; USA | 4.25 m
Women's Triple Jump	Kimberly Williams; JAM | 14.31 m	Anna Pyatykh; RUS | DQ	Yosiris Urrutia; COL | 14.13 m	Irina Gumenyuk; RUS | 13.97 m	Linda Leverton; AUS | 13.80 m	Amanda Smock; USA | 13.66 m	Snežana Vukmirovič; SLO | 13.50 m	Andrea Norris; USA | 12.83 m
Women's Shot Put	Valerie Adams; NZL | 19.68 m	Michelle Carter; USA | 19.51 m	Cleopatra Borel; TTO | 19.04 m	Irina Tarasova; RUS | DQ	Tia Brooks-Wannemacher; USA | 17.76 m	Anita Márton; HUN | 17.64 m	Jeneva Stevens; USA | 17.35 m	Yevgeniya Kolodko; RUS | DQ
Women's Javelin Throw	Linda Stahl; GER | 67.32 m	Kathryn Mitchell; AUS | 66.08 m	Madara Palameika; LAT | 64.86 m	Kara Winger; USA | 62.47 m	Katharina Molitor; GER | 61.67 m	Ásdís Hjálmsdóttir; ISL | 59.72 m	Sofi Flink; SWE | 55.99 m	Barbara Madejczyk; POL | 52.58 m

Lausanne
Event	1st +4 pts	2nd +2 pts	3rd +1 pts	4th ⠀	5th ⠀	6th ⠀	7th ⠀	8th ⠀
Men's 200m (+1.2 m/s)	Alonso Edward; PAN | 19.84	Nickel Ashmeade; JAM | 20.06	Christophe Lemaitre; FRA | 20.11	Wayde van Niekerk; RSA | 20.19	Femi Ogunode; QAT | 20.25	Yohan Blake; JAM | 20.48	Jaysuma Saidy Ndure; NOR | 20.54	Alex Wilson; SUI | 21.18
Men's 400m	Kirani James; GRN | 43.74	LaShawn Merritt; USA | 43.92	Youssef Ahmed Masrahi; KSA | 44.43	Christopher Brown; BAH | 44.59	Tony McQuay; USA | 45.14	Kévin Borlée; BEL | 45.50	David Verburg; USA | 46.00	Lalonde Gordon; TTO | 48.38
Men's 1500m	Ronald Kwemoi; KEN | 3:31.48	Silas Kiplagat; KEN | 3:31.81	James Kiplagat Magut; KEN | 3:31.91	Aman Wote; ETH | 3:31.96	Abdelaati Iguider; MAR | 3:32.10	Collins Cheboi; KEN | 3:32.29	Matthew Centrowitz Jr. USA | 3:32.70	Bethwell Birgen; KEN | 3:32.80
Men's 110mH (+0.4 m/s)	Pascal Martinot-Lagarde; FRA | 13.06	Sergey Shubenkov; RUS | 13.13	Andrew Riley; JAM | 13.23	David Oliver; USA | 13.23	Yordan O'Farrill; CUB | 13.28	Ryan Wilson; USA | 13.28	Jason Richardson; USA | 13.29	Orlando Ortega; CUB | 13.38
Men's 400mH	Javier Culson; PUR | 48.32	Michael Tinsley; USA | 48.40	Cornel Fredericks; RSA | 49.00	Félix Sánchez; DOM | 49.08	LJ van Zyl; RSA | 49.23	Jehue Gordon; TTO | 49.29	Kariem Hussein; SUI | 49.38	Rhys Williams; GBR | 50.30
Men's 3000mSC	Jairus Kipchoge Birech; KEN | 8:03.34	Conseslus Kipruto; KEN | 8:11.93	Jonathan Muia Ndiku; KEN | 8:12.95	Brimin Kiprop Kipruto; KEN | 8:14.00	Hilal Yego; KEN | 8:19.42	Lawrence Kemboi Kipsang; KEN | 8:20.03	Abel Kiprop Mutai; KEN | 8:21.10	Paul Kipsiele Koech; KEN | 8:21.78
Men's High Jump	Bohdan Bondarenko; UKR | 2.40 m	Andrii Protsenko; UKR | 2.40 m	Ivan Ukhov; RUS | DQ	Mutaz Essa Barshim; QAT | 2.38 m	Derek Drouin; CAN | 2.35 m	Erik Kynard; USA | 2.32 m	Mickaël Hanany; FRA | 2.25 m	Daniil Tsyplakov; RUS | 2.25 m
Men's Pole Vault	Renaud Lavillenie; FRA | 5.87 m	Thiago Braz; BRA | 5.72 m	Kévin Ménaldo; FRA | 5.62 m	Seito Yamamoto; JPN | 5.62 m	Brad Walker; USA | 5.62 m	Malte Mohr; GER | 5.62 m	Karsten Dilla; GER | 5.47 m	Steven Lewis; GBR | 5.47 m
Men's Long Jump	Jeff Henderson; USA | 8.31 m	Greg Rutherford; GBR | 8.19 m	Jinzhe Li; CHN | 8.10 m	Michel Tornéus; SWE | 8.07 m	Luis Alberto Rivera Morales; MEX | 8.02 m	Aleksandr Menkov; RUS | 8.02 m	Louis Tsatoumas; GRE | 7.97 m	Salim Sdiri; FRA | 7.78 m
Men's Discus Throw	Piotr Małachowski; POL | 66.63 m	Jorge Fernández; CUB | 66.50 m	Gerd Kanter; EST | 64.91 m	Erik Cadée; NED | 64.61 m	Daniel Ståhl; SWE | 64.60 m	Frank Casanas; ESP | 63.86 m	Andrius Gudžius; LTU | 63.38 m	Benn Harradine; AUS | 63.23 m
Women's 100m (-0.3 m/s)	Michelle-Lee Ahye; TTO | 10.98	Murielle Ahouré-Demps; CIV | 10.98	English Gardner; USA | 11.19	Verena Sailer; GER | 11.23	Dafne Schippers; NED | 11.28	Mujinga Kambundji; SUI | 11.34	Jamile Samuel; NED | 11.37	Blessing Okagbare; NGR | DNF
Women's 800m	Eunice Jepkoech Sum; KEN | 1:58.48	Ekaterina Guliyev; RUS | 1:58.79	Tigst Assefa; ETH | 1:59.24	Molly Ludlow; USA | 1:59.30	Lynsey Sharp; GBR | 1:59.67	Janeth Jepkosgei; KEN | 1:59.73	Marina Arzamasova; BLR | 1:59.81	Malika Akkaoui; MAR | 2:02.07
Women's 3000m	Mercy Cherono; KEN | 8:50.24	Genzebe Dibaba; ETH | 8:50.81	Viola Jelagat Kibiwot; KEN | 8:52.03	Irene Jelagat; KEN | 8:52.77	Almaz Ayana; ETH | 8:52.77	Janet Kisa; KEN | 8:53.66	Stacey Chepkemboi Ndiwa; KEN | 8:53.66	Agnes Jebet Tirop; KEN | 8:57.00
Women's Triple Jump	Caterine Ibarguen; COL | 14.87 m	Yekaterina Koneva; RUS | 14.67 m	Patrícia Mamona; POR | 14.49 m	Olha Saladukha; UKR | 14.33 m	Anna Pyatykh; RUS | DQ	Mabel Gay; CUB | 14.27 m	Hanna Minenko; ISR | 14.19 m	Keila Costa; BRA | 13.91 m
Women's Shot Put	Valerie Adams; NZL | 20.42 m	Lijiao Gong; CHN | 19.65 m	Michelle Carter; USA | 19.38 m	Cleopatra Borel; TTO | 18.88 m	Yuliya Leantsiuk; BLR | 18.72 m	Aliona Dubitskaya; BLR | 18.20 m	Anita Márton; HUN | 18.10 m	Alena Abramchuk; BLR | 17.69 m
Women's Javelin Throw	Barbora Špotáková; CZE | 66.72 m	Martina Ratej; SLO | DQ	Kimberley Mickle; AUS | 64.20 m	Linda Stahl; GER | 63.20 m	Sunette Viljoen; RSA | 62.15 m	Kara Winger; USA | 61.77 m	Katharina Molitor; GER | 58.40 m	Kathryn Mitchell; AUS | 58.23 m

Paris
Event	1st +4 pts	2nd +2 pts	3rd +1 pts	4th ⠀	5th ⠀	6th ⠀	7th ⠀	8th ⠀
Men's 100m (-0.8 m/s)	Michael Rodgers; USA | 10.00	Richard Thompson; TTO | 10.08	Kim Collins; SKN | 10.10	Nesta Carter; JAM | 10.12	Kemar Bailey-Cole; JAM | 10.14	Chijindu Ujah; GBR | 10.20	Alonso Edward; PAN | 10.26	Christophe Lemaitre; FRA | 10.28
Men's 800m	Asbel Kiprop; KEN | 1:43.34	Nijel Amos; BOT | 1:43.70	Yeimer López; CUB | 1:43.71	Pierre-Ambroise Bosse; FRA | 1:44.23	Ferguson Cheruiyot Rotich; KEN | 1:44.30	André Olivier; RSA | 1:44.42	Marcin Lewandowski; POL | 1:44.49	Adam Kszczot; POL | 1:44.50
Men's 5000m	Edwin Cheruiyot Soi; KEN | 12:59.82	Yenew Alamirew; ETH | 13:00.21	Paul Kipngetich Tanui; KEN | 13:00.53	Galen Rupp; USA | 13:00.99	Thomas Pkemei Longosiwa; KEN | 13:01.74	Lawi Lalang; KEN | 13:03.85	Caleb Mwangangi Ndiku; KEN | 13:08.47	Muktar Edris; ETH | 13:09.08
Men's 400mH	Michael Tinsley; USA | 48.25	Cornel Fredericks; RSA | 48.42	Javier Culson; PUR | 48.45	Félix Sánchez; DOM | 48.91	Mamadou Kasse Hann; SEN | 49.29	Ashton Eaton; USA | 49.58	Niall Flannery; GBR | 49.73	Johnny Dutch; USA | 49.98
Men's Pole Vault	Renaud Lavillenie; FRA | 5.70 m	Augusto Dutra; BRA | 5.70 m	Kévin Ménaldo; FRA | 5.70 m	Piotr Lisek; POL | 5.60 m	Konstantinos Filippidis; GRE | 5.60 m	Mark Hollis; USA | 5.60 m	Paweł Wojciechowski; POL | 5.45 m	Damiel Dossevi; FRA | 5.45 m
Men's Triple Jump	Benjamin Compaoré; FRA | 17.12 m	Christian Taylor; USA | 17.11 m	Alexis Copello; CUB | 17.04 m	Nelson Évora; POR | 16.97 m	Ernesto Revé; CUB | 16.94 m	Aleksey Fyodorov; RUS | 16.84 m	Will Claye; USA | 16.79 m	Daniele Greco; ITA | 16.68 m
Men's Shot Put	David Storl; GER | 21.41 m	Reese Hoffa; USA | 21.38 m	Kurt Roberts; USA | 20.67 m	Tomasz Majewski; POL | 20.14 m	Ryan Whiting; USA | 19.92 m	Ladislav Prášil; CZE | 19.90 m	Marco Fortes; POR | 19.75 m	Joe Kovacs; USA | 19.46 m
Men's Javelin Throw	Ihab Abdelrahman; EGY | 87.10 m	Tero Pitkämäki; FIN | 86.63 m	Thomas Röhler; GER | 84.74 m	Ryohei Arai; JPN | 81.52 m	Vítězslav Veselý; CZE | 81.43 m	Łukasz Grzeszczuk; POL | 81.04 m	Andreas Thorkildsen; NOR | 80.79 m	Zigismunds Sirmais; LAT | 77.99 m
Women's 200m (+0.4 m/s)	Blessing Okagbare; NGR | 22.32	Allyson Felix; USA | 22.34	Anthonique Strachan; BAH | 22.54	Myriam Soumaré; FRA | 22.60	Shelly-Ann Fraser-Pryce; JAM | 22.63	Simone Facey; JAM | 22.75	Jamile Samuel; NED | 22.81	Kimberlyn Duncan; USA | 23.01
Women's 400m	Sanya Richards-Ross; USA | 50.10	Stephenie Ann McPherson; JAM | 50.40	Novlene Williams-Mills; JAM | 50.68	Amantle Montsho; BOT | 50.70	Olha Zemlyak; UKR | 51.35	Natasha Hastings; USA | 51.74	Floria Guei; FRA | 51.89	Marie Gayot; FRA | 52.05
Women's 1500m	Sifan Hassan; NED | 3:57.00	Jenny Simpson; USA | 3:57.22	Hellen Obiri; KEN | 3:58.89	Faith Kipyegon; KEN | 3:59.21	Shannon Rowbury; USA | 3:59.49	Laura Muir; GBR | 4:00.07	Mimi Belete; BRN | 4:00.08	Laura Weightman; GBR | 4:00.17
Women's 100mH (0.0 m/s)	Dawn Harper-Nelson; USA | 12.44	Queen Claye; USA | 12.46	Lolo Jones; USA | 12.68	Cindy Billaud; FRA | 12.71	Tiffany Porter; GBR | 12.72	Sally Pearson; AUS | 12.89	Kristi Castlin; USA | 12.96	Nadine Hildebrand; GER | 13.00
Women's 3000mSC	Hiwot Ayalew; ETH | 9:11.65	Emma Coburn; USA | 9:14.12	Sofia Assefa; ETH | 9:18.71	Etenesh Diro; ETH | 9:19.71	Salima el Ouali Alami; MAR | 9:21.24	Lidya Chepkurui; KEN | 9:24.07	Stephanie Garcia; USA | 9:24.35	Milcah Chemos; KEN | 9:26.49
Women's High Jump	Blanka Vlašić; CRO | 2.00 m	Mariya Lasitskene; RUS | 2.00 m	Ana Šimić; CRO | 1.94 m	Ruth Beitia; ESP | 1.94 m	Oksana Okuneva; UKR | 1.94 m	Justyna Kasprzycka; POL | 1.94 m	Inika McPherson; USA | DQ	Svetlana Radzivil; UZB | 1.92 m
Women's Long Jump	Éloyse Lesueur-Aymonin; FRA | 6.92 m	Brittney Reese; USA | 6.87 m	Ivana Vuleta; SRB | 6.78 m	Shara Proctor; GBR | 6.70 m	Darya Klishina; RUS | 6.63 m	Tianna Madison; USA | 6.60 m	Sosthene Moguenara-Taroum; GER | 6.59 m	Irene Pusterla; SUI | 6.57 m
Women's Discus Throw	Sandra Perković; CRO | 68.48 m	Dani Stevens; AUS | 67.40 m	Gia Lewis-Smallwood; USA | 65.59 m	Melina Robert-Michon; FRA | 64.17 m	Denia Caballero; CUB | 63.29 m	Shanice Craft; GER | 63.21 m	Yaimé Pérez; CUB | 62.72 m	Julia Harting; GER | 61.13 m

London
Event	1st +4 pts	2nd +2 pts	3rd +1 pts	4th ⠀	5th ⠀	6th ⠀	7th ⠀	8th ⠀
Men's 100m (+0.3 m/s)	Nickel Ashmeade; JAM | 9.97	Michael Rodgers; USA | 9.97	Nesta Carter; JAM | 9.98	James Dasaolu; GBR | 10.03	Kim Collins; SKN | 10.07	Richard Thompson; TTO | 10.09	Harry Aikines-Aryeetey; GBR | 10.21	Richard Kilty; GBR | 10.23
Men's 800m	David Rudisha; KEN | 1:43.34	André Olivier; RSA | 1:45.65	Michael Rimmer; GBR | 1:45.89	Matthew Centrowitz Jr. USA | 1:46.12	Erik Sowinski; USA | 1:46.45	Wesley Vázquez; PUR | 1:46.47	Mukhtar Mohammed; GBR | 1:46.56	Jeremiah Kipkorir Mutai; KEN | 1:46.72
Men's 5000m	Hagos Gebrhiwet; ETH | 13:11.09	Yenew Alamirew; ETH | 13:11.76	Edwin Cheruiyot Soi; KEN | 13:13.52	Thomas Pkemei Longosiwa; KEN | 13:14.02	Emmanuel Kipkemei Bett; KEN | 13:14.91	Cameron Levins; CAN | 13:15.38	Augustine Kiprono Choge; KEN | 13:18.75	Ibrahim Jeilan; ETH | 13:19.43
Men's 400mH	Javier Culson; PUR | 48.35	Ashton Eaton; USA | 48.69	Michael Tinsley; USA | 48.91	Félix Sánchez; DOM | 49.01	Roxroy Cato; JAM | 49.04	Rhys Williams; GBR | DQ	Niall Flannery; GBR | 49.79	Tom Burton; GBR | 50.36
Men's Triple Jump	Christian Taylor; USA | 17.36 m	Will Claye; USA | 17.27 m	Chris Benard; USA | 16.54 m	Tosin Oke; NGR | 16.51 m	Ernesto Revé; CUB | 16.49 m	Omar Craddock; USA | 16.06 m	Julian Reid; GBR | 16.03 m	Jonathan Henrique Silva; BRA | 15.89 m
Men's Shot Put	Reese Hoffa; USA | 21.67 m	David Storl; GER | 21.38 m	Tom Walsh; NZL | 21.23 m	Joe Kovacs; USA | 20.94 m	Tomasz Majewski; POL | 20.75 m	Germán Luján Lauro; ARG | 20.58 m	Kurt Roberts; USA | 20.31 m	Ladislav Prášil; CZE | 20.14 m
Men's Javelin Throw	Thomas Röhler; GER | 86.99 m	Vítězslav Veselý; CZE | 85.23 m	Tero Pitkämäki; FIN | 84.95 m	Andreas Hofmann; GER | 83.97 m	Antti Ruuskanen; FIN | 82.66 m	Keshorn Walcott; TTO | 79.62 m	Zigismunds Sirmais; LAT | 76.24 m	Andreas Thorkildsen; NOR | NM
Women's 200m (+0.2 m/s)	Dafne Schippers; NED | 22.34	Allyson Felix; USA | 22.35	Blessing Okagbare; NGR | 22.41	Jodie Williams; GBR | 22.60	Shalonda Solomon; USA | 22.67	Kimberlyn Duncan; USA | 22.86	Anthonique Strachan; BAH | 22.87	Samantha Henry-Robinson; JAM | 23.43
Women's 400m	Francena McCorory; USA | 49.93	Sanya Richards-Ross; USA | 50.39	Novlene Williams-Mills; JAM | 50.60	Stephenie Ann McPherson; JAM | 50.98	Amantle Montsho; BOT | 51.35	Regina George; NGR | 51.82	Natasha Hastings; USA | 52.38	Kelly Massey; GBR | 52.67
Women's 1500m	Sifan Hassan; NED | 4:00.67	Abeba Aregawi; SWE | 4:00.94	Axumawit Embaye; ETH | 4:02.78	Laura Weightman; GBR | 4:03.98	Treniere Moser; USA | 4:04.18	Meraf Bahta; SWE | 4:04.23	Ingvill Måkestad Bovim; NOR | 4:04.33	Hellen Obiri; KEN | 4:05.26
Women's 100mH (+0.2 m/s)	Queen Claye; USA | 12.58	Lolo Jones; USA | 12.68	Sally Pearson; AUS | 12.87	Tiffany Porter; GBR | 12.88	Jasmin Stowers; USA | 12.91	Nia Ali; USA | 13.02	Nadine Hildebrand; GER | 13.04	LaVonne Idlette; DOM | 13.13
Women's 3000mSC	Hiwot Ayalew; ETH | 9:10.64	Emma Coburn; USA | 9:11.42	Milcah Chemos; KEN | 9:21.91	Charlotta Fougberg; SWE | 9:23.96	Stephanie Garcia; USA | 9:24.28	Sandra Eriksson; FIN | 9:24.70	Tigest Getent Mekonen; ETH | 9:28.36	Lidya Chepkurui; KEN | 9:32.28
Women's High Jump	Blanka Vlašić; CRO | 1.96 m	Inika McPherson; USA | DQ	Ana Šimić; CRO | 1.93 m	Isobel Pooley; GBR | 1.89 m	Justyna Kasprzycka; POL | 1.89 m	Jayne Nisbet; GBR | 1.80 m	Anna Chicherova; RUS | 1.75 m	
Women's Pole Vault	Fabiana Murer; BRA | 4.65 m	Aikaterini Stefanidi; GRE | 4.65 m	Yarisley Silva; CUB | 4.65 m	Jennifer Suhr; USA | 4.55 m	Kylie Hutson; USA | 4.40 m	Nikoleta Kyriakopoulou; GRE | 4.40 m	Katharina Bauer; GER | 4.40 m	Mary Saxer; USA | 4.40 m
Women's Long Jump	Tianna Madison; USA | 6.98 m	Katarina Johnson-Thompson; GBR | 6.92 m	Shara Proctor; GBR | 6.82 m	Christabel Nettey; CAN | 6.73 m	Funmi Jimoh; USA | 6.70 m	Sosthene Moguenara-Taroum; GER | 6.69 m	Erica Jarder; SWE | 6.57 m	Bianca Stuart; BAH | 6.52 m
Women's Discus Throw	Gia Lewis-Smallwood; USA | 67.59 m	Sandra Perković; CRO | 66.30 m	Dani Stevens; AUS | 65.21 m	Zinaida Sendriutė; LTU | 61.87 m	Yaimé Pérez; CUB | 61.41 m	Shanice Craft; GER | 59.90 m	Irina Rodrigues; POR | 58.81 m	Żaneta Glanc; POL | 57.68 m

Monaco
Event	1st +4 pts	2nd +2 pts	3rd +1 pts	4th ⠀	5th ⠀	6th ⠀	7th ⠀	8th ⠀
Men's 200m (-0.5 m/s)	Justin Gatlin; USA | 19.68	Nickel Ashmeade; JAM | 19.99	Christophe Lemaitre; FRA | 20.08	Tyson Gay; USA | 20.22	Curtis Mitchell; USA | 20.28	Ryan Bailey; USA | 20.37	Rasheed Dwyer; JAM | 20.48	Sean McLean; USA | 20.67
Men's 400m	LaShawn Merritt; USA | 44.30	Gil Roberts; USA | 44.62	Isaac Makwala; BOT | 44.90	Tony McQuay; USA | 44.92	Luguelín Santos; DOM | 44.97	Conrad Williams; GBR | 45.53	Kévin Borlée; BEL | 45.60	Mame-Ibra Anne; FRA | 45.87
Men's 1500m	Silas Kiplagat; KEN | 3:27.64	Asbel Kiprop; KEN | 3:28.45	Ronald Kwemoi; KEN | 3:28.81	Ayanleh Souleiman; DJI | 3:29.58	Abdelaati Iguider; MAR | 3:29.83	Aman Wote; ETH | 3:29.91	Nick Willis; NZL | 3:29.91	Leonel Manzano; USA | 3:30.98
Men's 110mH (+0.2 m/s)	Pascal Martinot-Lagarde; FRA | 12.95	Orlando Ortega; CUB | 13.01	Sergey Shubenkov; RUS | 13.14	Ryan Wilson; USA | 13.18	Andrew Riley; JAM | 13.19	David Oliver; USA | 13.38	Aries Merritt; USA | 13.47	Dimitri Bascou; FRA | 13.61
Men's 3000mSC	Jairus Kipchoge Birech; KEN | 8:03.33	Conseslus Kipruto; KEN | 8:09.81	Hilal Yego; KEN | 8:10.23	Matthew Hughes; CAN | 8:12.81	Bernard Nganga; KEN | 8:15.01	Evan Jager; USA | 8:15.49	Paul Kipsiele Koech; KEN | 8:18.29	Brahim Taleb; MAR | 8:19.19
Men's High Jump	Bohdan Bondarenko; UKR | 2.40 m	Mutaz Essa Barshim; QAT | 2.37 m	Ivan Ukhov; RUS | DQ	Erik Kynard; USA | 2.34 m	Derek Drouin; CAN | 2.34 m	Andrii Protsenko; UKR | 2.34 m	Marco Fassinotti; ITA | 2.30 m	Naoto Tobe; JPN | 2.30 m
Men's Long Jump	Jinzhe Li; CHN | 8.09 m	Ignisious Gaisah; NED | 8.01 m	Luis Alberto Rivera Morales; MEX | 8.00 m	Chris Tomlinson; GBR | 7.94 m	Aleksandr Menkov; RUS | 7.93 m	Michael Hartfield; USA | 7.88 m	Christian Taylor; USA | 7.88 m	Michel Tornéus; SWE | 7.83 m
Men's Discus Throw	Piotr Małachowski; POL | 65.84 m	Jorge Fernández; CUB | 65.46 m	Gerd Kanter; EST | 64.98 m	Ehsan Hadadi; IRI | 64.47 m	Philip Milanov; BEL | 62.99 m	Robert Urbanek; POL | 62.56 m	Daniel Ståhl; SWE | 61.60 m	Benn Harradine; AUS | 61.25 m
Women's 100m (+0.8 m/s)	Tori Bowie; USA | 10.80	Veronica Campbell-Brown; JAM | 10.96	Murielle Ahouré-Demps; CIV | 10.97	Blessing Okagbare; NGR | 10.97	Allyson Felix; USA | 11.01	Shelly-Ann Fraser-Pryce; JAM | 11.01	Myriam Soumaré; FRA | 11.03	Stella Akakpo; FRA | 11.39
Women's 800m	Ajee Wilson; USA | 1:57.67	Eunice Jepkoech Sum; KEN | 1:57.92	Winnie Nanyondo; UGA | 1:58.63	Janeth Jepkosgei; KEN | 1:58.70	Ekaterina Guliyev; RUS | 1:59.31	Molly Ludlow; USA | 1:59.32	Laura Roesler; USA | 1:59.44	Jessica Warner-Judd; GBR | 1:59.99
Women's 5000m	Genzebe Dibaba; ETH | 14:28.88	Almaz Ayana; ETH | 14:29.19	Viola Jelagat Kibiwot; KEN | 14:33.73	Sally Kipyego; KEN | 14:37.18	Betsy Saina; KEN | 14:39.49	Molly Huddle; USA | 14:42.64	Mercy Cherono; KEN | 14:44.56	Shannon Rowbury; USA | 14:48.68
Women's 400mH	Kaliese Carter; JAM | 54.09	Georganne Moline; USA | 54.73	Cassandra Tate; USA | 55.07	Anna Ryzhykova; UKR | 55.24	Wenda Nel; RSA | 55.29	Kemi Adekoya; BRN | 55.38	Zuzana Hejnová; CZE | 55.86	Kori Carter; USA | 55.94
Women's Pole Vault	Fabiana Murer; BRA | 4.76 m	Jennifer Suhr; USA | 4.71 m	Aikaterini Stefanidi; GRE | 4.71 m	Lisa Ryzih; GER | 4.65 m	Anzhelika Sidorova; RUS | 4.55 m	Alana Boyd; AUS | 4.55 m	Yarisley Silva; CUB | 4.40 m	Marion Fiack; FRA | 4.40 m
Women's Triple Jump	Caterine Ibarguen; COL | 15.31 m	Yekaterina Koneva; RUS | 14.89 m	Kimberly Williams; JAM | 14.59 m	Yosiris Urrutia; COL | 14.58 m	Patrícia Mamona; POR | 14.34 m	Mabel Gay; CUB | 14.33 m	Irina Gumenyuk; RUS | 14.11 m	Yanmei Li; CHN | 13.62 m
Women's Shot Put	Valerie Adams; NZL | 20.38 m	Christina Schwanitz; GER | 19.54 m	Michelle Carter; USA | 19.05 m	Cleopatra Borel; TTO | 18.96 m	Yevgeniya Kolodko; RUS | DQ	Felisha Johnson; USA | 18.79 m		
Women's Javelin Throw	Barbora Špotáková; CZE | 66.96 m	Martina Ratej; SLO | DQ	Kimberley Mickle; AUS | 62.94 m	Madara Palameika; LAT | 61.41 m	Linda Stahl; GER | 60.32 m	Mathilde Andraud; FRA | 59.80 m	Kara Winger; USA | 57.64 m	Yuki Ebihara; JPN | 56.52 m

Stockholm
Event	1st +4 pts	2nd +2 pts	3rd +1 pts	4th ⠀	5th ⠀	6th ⠀	7th ⠀	8th ⠀
Men's 100m (+2.0 m/s)	Nesta Carter; JAM | 9.96	Keston Bledman; TTO | 10.09	Chijindu Ujah; GBR | 10.10	Nickel Ashmeade; JAM | 10.10	Harry Aikines-Aryeetey; GBR | 10.20	Jaysuma Saidy Ndure; NOR | 10.33	Odain Rose; SWE | 10.47	Michael Rodgers; USA | DQ
Men's 800m	Adam Kszczot; POL | 1:45.25	Ayanleh Souleiman; DJI | 1:45.49	Marcin Lewandowski; POL | 1:45.76	Pierre-Ambroise Bosse; FRA | 1:45.95	Nijel Amos; BOT | 1:46.04	Andreas Bube; DEN | 1:46.59	Andreas Almgren; SWE | 1:47.54	Timothy Kitum; KEN | 1:47.93
Men's 5000m	Muktar Edris; ETH | 12:54.83	Thomas Pkemei Longosiwa; KEN | 12:56.16	Caleb Mwangangi Ndiku; KEN | 12:59.17	Galen Rupp; USA | 13:05.97	Edwin Cheruiyot Soi; KEN | 13:07.68	Hassan Mead; USA | 13:07.81	Hagos Gebrhiwet; ETH | 13:12.40	Ben True; USA | 13:13.33
Men's 400mH	Michael Tinsley; USA | 49.60	Javier Culson; PUR | 49.84	Jehue Gordon; TTO | 50.13	Cornel Fredericks; RSA | 50.18	Rasmus Mägi; EST | 50.42	Roxroy Cato; JAM | 51.09	Félix Sánchez; DOM | 51.68	Petter Olson; SWE | 52.62
Men's Pole Vault	Konstantinos Filippidis; GRE | 5.60 m	Piotr Lisek; POL | 5.60 m	Changrui Xue; CHN | 5.60 m	Melker Svärd Jacobsson; SWE | 5.45 m	Paweł Wojciechowski; POL | 5.30 m	Mark Hollis; USA | NH m	Augusto Dutra; BRA | NH m	Kévin Ménaldo; FRA | NH m
Men's Long Jump	Godfrey Khotso Mokoena; RSA | 8.09 m	Ignisious Gaisah; NED | 8.04 m	Michel Tornéus; SWE | 8.03 m	Zarck Visser; RSA | 7.98 m	Jinzhe Li; CHN | 7.94 m	Arttu Pajulahti; FIN | 7.92 m	Mauro Vinicius da Silva; BRA | 7.88 m	Jeff Henderson; USA | 7.78 m
Men's Shot Put	Reese Hoffa; USA | 21.06 m	Tom Walsh; NZL | 20.79 m	David Storl; GER | 20.77 m	Joe Kovacs; USA | 20.67 m	O'Dayne Richards; JAM | 20.46 m	Ryan Whiting; USA | 20.39 m	Christian Cantwell; USA | 20.38 m	Borja Vivas; ESP | 20.02 m
Men's Javelin Throw	Antti Ruuskanen; FIN | 87.24 m	Thomas Röhler; GER | 85.12 m	Tero Pitkämäki; FIN | 84.73 m	Julius Yego; KEN | 84.67 m	Ihab Abdelrahman; EGY | 84.58 m	Keshorn Walcott; TTO | 84.27 m	Ari Mannio; FIN | 79.99 m	Andreas Hofmann; GER | 77.67 m
Women's 200m (+0.4 m/s)	Allyson Felix; USA | 22.85	Tori Bowie; USA | 22.91	Joanna Atkins; USA | 23.19	Jeneba Tarmoh; USA | 23.29	Hrystyna Stuy; UKR | 23.53	Irene Ekelund; SWE | 23.61	Hanna-Maari Latvala; FIN | 23.76	Schillonie Calvert-Powell; JAM | DQ
Women's 400m	Novlene Williams-Mills; JAM | 50.09	Sanya Richards-Ross; USA | 50.27	Francena McCorory; USA | 50.65	Stephenie Ann McPherson; JAM | 51.01	Christine Day; JAM | 52.03	Natasha Hastings; USA | 52.04	Indira Terrero; ESP | 52.70	Elin Moraiti; SWE | 54.95
Women's 1500m	Jenny Simpson; USA | 4:00.38	Genzebe Dibaba; ETH | 4:01.00	Sifan Hassan; NED | 4:01.62	Shannon Rowbury; USA | 4:02.96	Viola Jelagat Kibiwot; KEN | 4:04.17	Laura Muir; GBR | 4:04.71	Meraf Bahta; SWE | 4:05.39	Brenda Martinez; USA | 4:07.40
Women's 100mH (+1.4 m/s)	Queen Claye; USA | 12.66	Nia Ali; USA | 12.96	Dawn Harper-Nelson; USA | 12.99	Cindy Roleder; GER | 13.00	Alina Talay; BLR | 13.07	Nadine Hildebrand; GER | 13.20	Sally Pearson; AUS | DQ	Cindy Billaud; FRA | DNF
Women's 3000mSC	Hiwot Ayalew; ETH | 9:17.04	Habiba Ghribi; TUN | 9:18.39	Emma Coburn; USA | 9:20.31	Sofia Assefa; ETH | 9:22.02	Hyvin Kiyeng; KEN | 9:24.03	Sviatlana Kudzelich; BLR | 9:30.54	Salima el Ouali Alami; MAR | 9:32.53	Ashley Higginson; USA | 9:33.89
Women's High Jump	Mariya Lasitskene; RUS | 1.94 m	Airinė Palšytė; LTU | 1.94 m	Ana Šimić; CRO | 1.90 m	Ruth Beitia; ESP | 1.90 m	Alessia Trost; ITA | 1.90 m	Tonje Angelsen; NOR | 1.85 m	Justyna Kasprzycka; POL | 1.85 m	Emma Green; SWE | 1.85 m
Women's Long Jump	Tianna Madison; USA | 6.98 m	Éloyse Lesueur-Aymonin; FRA | 6.94 m	Ivana Vuleta; SRB | 6.61 m	Brittney Reese; USA | 6.60 m	Erica Jarder; SWE | 6.53 m	Malaika Mihambo; GER | 6.50 m	Aiga Grabuste; LAT | 6.48 m	Darya Klishina; RUS | 6.28 m
Women's Discus Throw	Sandra Perković; CRO | 66.74 m	Dani Stevens; AUS | 65.70 m	Gia Lewis-Smallwood; USA | 65.21 m	Melina Robert-Michon; FRA | 63.79 m	Shanice Craft; GER | 63.56 m	Julia Harting; GER | 62.28 m	Anna Rüh; GER | 60.48 m	Sanna Kämäräinen; FIN | 58.63 m

Birmingham
Event	1st +4 pts	2nd +2 pts	3rd +1 pts	4th ⠀	5th ⠀	6th ⠀	7th ⠀	8th ⠀
Men's 200m (-0.3 m/s)	Nickel Ashmeade; JAM | 20.33	Alonso Edward; PAN | 20.35	Rasheed Dwyer; JAM | 20.58	Curtis Mitchell; USA | 20.73	Jason Livermore; JAM | 20.80	James Ellington; GBR | 20.93	Jeremy Dodson; USA | 21.36	Trell Kimmons; USA | 23.69
Men's 400m	Kirani James; GRN | 44.59	Isaac Makwala; BOT | 45.02	Martyn Rooney; GBR | 45.25	Luguelín Santos; DOM | 45.47	Christopher Brown; BAH | 45.85	Josh Mance; USA | 46.48	Matthew Hudson-Smith; GBR | 46.60	Gil Roberts; USA | DNS
Men's Mile	Asbel Kiprop; KEN | 3:51.89	Ayanleh Souleiman; DJI | 3:52.07	Vincent Kibet; KEN | 3:52.15	James Kiplagat Magut; KEN | 3:52.20	Aman Wote; ETH | 3:52.34	Collins Cheboi; KEN | 3:52.61	Henrik Ingebrigtsen; NOR | 3:52.79	Leonel Manzano; USA | 3:53.05
Men's 3000mSC	Jairus Kipchoge Birech; KEN | 8:07.80	Brimin Kiprop Kipruto; KEN | 8:16.61	Barnabas Kipyego; KEN | 8:17.03	Hilal Yego; KEN | 8:17.99	Conseslus Kipruto; KEN | 8:18.73	Haron Lagat; KEN | 8:19.00	Lawrence Kemboi Kipsang; KEN | 8:22.17	Donn Cabral; USA | 8:22.48
Men's High Jump	Mutaz Essa Barshim; QAT | 2.38 m	Bohdan Bondarenko; UKR | 2.38 m	Derek Drouin; CAN | 2.32 m	Erik Kynard; USA | 2.32 m	Wojciech Theiner; POL | 2.24 m	Chris Baker; GBR | 2.24 m	Jesse Williams; USA | 2.24 m	Marco Fassinotti; ITA | 2.20 m
Men's Long Jump	Christian Taylor; USA | 8.09 m	Zarck Visser; RSA | 8.08 m	Jinzhe Li; CHN | 8.06 m	Greg Rutherford; GBR | 8.04 m	Jeff Henderson; USA | 8.01 m	Michael Hartfield; USA | 7.85 m	Michel Tornéus; SWE | 7.79 m	Chris Tomlinson; GBR | 7.73 m
Men's Discus Throw	Robert Harting; GER | 67.57 m	Piotr Małachowski; POL | 64.98 m	Robert Urbanek; POL | 64.27 m	Gerd Kanter; EST | 64.21 m	Vikas Gowda; IND | 62.78 m	Benn Harradine; AUS | 62.23 m	Daniel Ståhl; SWE | 60.96 m	Brett Morse; GBR | 59.66 m
Women's 100m (-1.1 m/s)	Kerron Stewart; JAM | 11.22	Myriam Soumaré; FRA | 11.25	Asha Philip; GBR | 11.26	Ashleigh Nelson; GBR | 11.27	Carmelita Jeter; USA | 11.28	Jeneba Tarmoh; USA | 11.33	Lekeisha Lawson; USA | 11.41	Tori Bowie; USA | DNF
Women's 800m	Lynsey Sharp; GBR | 1:59.14	Eunice Jepkoech Sum; KEN | 1:59.42	Brenda Martinez; USA | 1:59.56	Laura Muir; GBR | 2:00.67	Janeth Jepkosgei; KEN | 2:00.67	Ajee Wilson; USA | 2:01.70	Hannah England; GBR | 2:01.96	Angela Petty; NZL | 2:02.22
Women's 2 Miles	Mercy Cherono; KEN | 9:11.49	Viola Jelagat Kibiwot; KEN | 9:12.59	Irene Jelagat; KEN | 9:12.90	Genzebe Dibaba; ETH | 9:14.28	Betsy Saina; KEN | 9:16.95	Alemitu Haroye; ETH | 9:20.81	Susan Krumins; NED | 9:23.52	Renata Pliś; POL | 9:28.80
Women's 100mH (+0.2 m/s)	Dawn Harper-Nelson; USA | 12.66	Queen Claye; USA | 12.70	Sally Pearson; AUS | 12.85	Tiffany Porter; GBR | 12.93	Brianna McNeal; USA | 12.95	Nia Ali; USA | 12.99	Kristi Castlin; USA | 13.00	Nadine Hildebrand; GER | 13.32
Women's 400mH	Kaliese Carter; JAM | 53.80	Eilidh Doyle; GBR | 54.89	Denisa Rosolová; CZE | 55.65	Cassandra Tate; USA | 55.71	Tiffany Williams; USA | 56.13	Shona Richards; GBR | 58.46	Georganne Moline; USA | DNS	Kori Carter; USA | DNF
Women's Pole Vault	Aikaterini Stefanidi; GRE | 4.57 m	Nikoleta Kyriakopoulou; GRE | 4.47 m	Jennifer Suhr; USA | 4.47 m	Mary Saxer; USA | 4.32 m	Tina Šutej; SLO | 4.32 m	Alana Boyd; AUS | NH m	Fabiana Murer; BRA | NH m	Jiřina Ptáčníková; CZE | NH m
Women's Triple Jump	Caterine Ibarguen; COL | 14.52 m	Olga Rypakova; KAZ | 14.37 m	Yosiris Urrutia; COL | 14.14 m	Kimberly Williams; JAM | 14.04 m	Ruth Ndoumbe; ESP | 13.78 m	Dana Velďáková; SVK | 13.69 m	Laura Samuel; GBR | 13.63 m	Yamilé Aldama; GBR | NM
Women's Shot Put	Valerie Adams; NZL | 19.96 m	Christina Schwanitz; GER | 19.27 m	Cleopatra Borel; TTO | 18.62 m	Michelle Carter; USA | 18.22 m	Anita Márton; HUN | 18.01 m	Felisha Johnson; USA | 17.96 m	Tia Brooks-Wannemacher; USA | 17.49 m	Natalia Ducó; CHI | 16.97 m
Women's Javelin Throw	Elizabeth Gleadle; CAN | 64.49 m	Barbora Špotáková; CZE | 62.89 m	Linda Stahl; GER | 62.75 m	Martina Ratej; SLO | 60.72 m	Madara Palameika; LAT | 59.45 m	Kathryn Mitchell; AUS | 59.36 m	Katharina Molitor; GER | 55.55 m	Tatjana Mirković; SRB | 53.73 m

Zurich
Event	1st +8 pts	2nd +4 pts	3rd +2 pts	4th ⠀	5th ⠀	6th ⠀	7th ⠀	8th ⠀
Men's 200m (-0.9 m/s)	Alonso Edward; PAN | 19.95	Nickel Ashmeade; JAM | 20.01	Rasheed Dwyer; JAM | 20.21	Christophe Lemaitre; FRA | 20.24	Churandy Martina; NED | 20.25	Curtis Mitchell; USA | 20.26	Serhiy Smelyk; UKR | 20.61	James Ellington; GBR | 21.00
Men's 400m	LaShawn Merritt; USA | 44.36	Gil Roberts; USA | 44.96	Isaac Makwala; BOT | 45.03	Martyn Rooney; GBR | 45.10	Christopher Brown; BAH | 45.25	Wayde van Niekerk; RSA | 45.46	Luguelín Santos; DOM | 45.51	Youssef Ahmed Masrahi; KSA | 45.75
Men's 800m	Nijel Amos; BOT | 1:43.77	Ayanleh Souleiman; DJI | 1:43.93	David Rudisha; KEN | 1:43.96	Ferguson Cheruiyot Rotich; KEN | 1:44.42	Pierre-Ambroise Bosse; FRA | 1:44.69	Marcin Lewandowski; POL | 1:44.75	Adam Kszczot; POL | 1:44.84	Mohammed Aman; ETH | 1:45.01
Men's 5000m	Caleb Mwangangi Ndiku; KEN | 13:07.01	Muktar Edris; ETH | 13:07.32	Galen Rupp; USA | 13:07.82	Thomas Pkemei Longosiwa; KEN | 13:08.67	Hayle Ibrahimov; AZE | 13:09.17	Lawi Lalang; KEN | 13:09.51	Augustine Kiprono Choge; KEN | 13:11.16	Ben True; USA | 13:11.24
Men's 400mH	Cornel Fredericks; RSA | 48.25	Michael Tinsley; USA | 48.31	Javier Culson; PUR | 48.53	Kariem Hussein; SUI | 48.70	Jehue Gordon; TTO | 48.91	Rasmus Mägi; EST | 49.30	Félix Sánchez; DOM | 49.31	Roxroy Cato; JAM | 49.32
Men's Triple Jump	Christian Taylor; USA | 17.51 m	Benjamin Compaoré; FRA | 17.45 m	Will Claye; USA | 17.39 m	Godfrey Khotso Mokoena; RSA | 16.82 m	Lyukman Adams; RUS | DQ	Aleksey Fyodorov; RUS | 16.58 m	Marian Oprea; ROU | 16.54 m	Yoann Rapinier; FRA | 16.51 m
Men's Shot Put	Reese Hoffa; USA | 21.88 m	David Storl; GER | 21.47 m	Joe Kovacs; USA | 21.43 m	O'Dayne Richards; JAM | 20.79 m	Ryan Whiting; USA | 20.74 m	Tom Walsh; NZL | 20.48 m	Tomasz Majewski; POL | 20.47 m	Asmir Kolašinac; SRB | 20.21 m
Men's Javelin Throw	Thomas Röhler; GER | 87.63 m	Keshorn Walcott; TTO | 85.77 m	Tero Pitkämäki; FIN | 85.12 m	Julius Yego; KEN | 84.71 m	Vítězslav Veselý; CZE | 84.04 m	Antti Ruuskanen; FIN | 83.85 m	Ihab Abdelrahman; EGY | 83.62 m	Lassi Etelätalo; FIN | 80.36 m
Women's 100m (-0.7 m/s)	Veronica Campbell-Brown; JAM | 11.04	Murielle Ahouré-Demps; CIV | 11.04	Blessing Okagbare; NGR | 11.06	Dafne Schippers; NED | 11.10	Kerron Stewart; JAM | 11.19	Ashleigh Nelson; GBR | 11.20	Allyson Felix; USA | 11.27	Mujinga Kambundji; SUI | 11.36
Women's 1500m	Jenny Simpson; USA | 3:59.92	Shannon Rowbury; USA | 3:59.93	Viola Jelagat Kibiwot; KEN | 4:00.46	Sifan Hassan; NED | 4:00.72	Meraf Bahta; SWE | 4:01.34	Brenda Martinez; USA | 4:01.36	Mimi Belete; BRN | 4:01.63	Abeba Aregawi; SWE | 4:03.40
Women's 100mH (-0.5 m/s)	Dawn Harper-Nelson; USA | 12.58	Sally Pearson; AUS | 12.71	Tiffany Porter; GBR | 12.72	Brianna McNeal; USA | 12.73	Cindy Roleder; GER | 13.01	Nadine Hildebrand; GER | 13.04	Noemi Zbären; SUI | 13.12	Queen Claye; USA | 21.62
Women's 3000mSC	Habiba Ghribi; TUN | 9:15.23	Hiwot Ayalew; ETH | 9:19.29	Sofia Assefa; ETH | 9:19.79	Ruth Jebet; BRN | 9:20.55	Emma Coburn; USA | 9:23.89	Hyvin Kiyeng; KEN | 9:29.67	Etenesh Diro; ETH | 9:31.33	Salima el Ouali Alami; MAR | 9:33.43
Women's High Jump	Mariya Lasitskene; RUS | 2.00 m	Ana Šimić; CRO | 1.98 m	Ruth Beitia; ESP | 1.93 m	Oksana Okuneva; UKR | 1.93 m	Blanka Vlašić; CRO | 1.93 m	Svetlana Radzivil; UZB | 1.89 m	Isobel Pooley; GBR | 1.89 m	Kamila Lićwinko; POL | 1.89 m
Women's Pole Vault	Fabiana Murer; BRA | 4.72 m	Jennifer Suhr; USA | 4.67 m	Aikaterini Stefanidi; GRE | 4.67 m	Nikoleta Kyriakopoulou; GRE | 4.67 m	Nicole Büchler; SUI | 4.67 m	Mary Saxer; USA | 4.57 m	Tina Šutej; SLO | 4.47 m	Naroa Agirre; ESP | 4.32 m
Women's Long Jump	Ivana Vuleta; SRB | 6.80 m	Tianna Madison; USA | 6.76 m	Brittney Reese; USA | 6.66 m	Irene Pusterla; SUI | 6.65 m	Melanie Bauschke; GER | 6.65 m	Erica Jarder; SWE | 6.61 m	Darya Klishina; RUS | 6.61 m	Éloyse Lesueur-Aymonin; FRA | 6.54 m
Women's Discus Throw	Sandra Perković; CRO | 68.36 m	Gia Lewis-Smallwood; USA | 67.32 m	Dani Stevens; AUS | 64.86 m	Shanice Craft; GER | 63.44 m	Melina Robert-Michon; FRA | 62.75 m	Julia Harting; GER | 61.14 m	Anna Rüh; GER | 60.72 m	Yekaterina Strokova; RUS | DQ

Brussels
Event	1st +8 pts	2nd +4 pts	3rd +2 pts	4th ⠀	5th ⠀	6th ⠀	7th ⠀	8th ⠀
Men's 100m (+0.6 m/s)	Justin Gatlin; USA | 9.77	Michael Rodgers; USA | 9.93	Asafa Powell; JAM | 9.95	Kemar Bailey-Cole; JAM | 9.96	James Dasaolu; GBR | 10.00	Tyson Gay; USA | 10.01	Nesta Carter; JAM | 10.01	Richard Thompson; TTO | 10.10
Men's 1500m	Taoufik Makhloufi; ALG | 3:31.78	Silas Kiplagat; KEN | 3:31.80	Ayanleh Souleiman; DJI | 3:32.82	Collins Cheboi; KEN | 3:32.85	Aman Wote; ETH | 3:32.94	Homiyu Tesfaye; GER | 3:33.22	Henrik Ingebrigtsen; NOR | 3:33.47	Vincent Kibet; KEN | 3:33.58
Men's 110mH (-0.1 m/s)	Pascal Martinot-Lagarde; FRA | 13.08	Orlando Ortega; CUB | 13.13	Sergey Shubenkov; RUS | 13.22	Ronnie Ash; USA | 13.24	Andrew Riley; JAM | 13.29	William Sharman; GBR | 13.31	Aries Merritt; USA | 13.37	Balázs Baji; HUN | 13.41
Men's 3000mSC	Jairus Kipchoge Birech; KEN | 7:58.41	Mahiedine Mekhissi; FRA | 8:03.23	Evan Jager; USA | 8:04.71	Daniel Huling; USA | 8:15.61	Conseslus Kipruto; KEN | 8:16.72	Brimin Kiprop Kipruto; KEN | 8:16.90	Ilgizar Safiulin; RUS | 8:20.29	Hilal Yego; KEN | 8:20.35
Men's High Jump	Mutaz Essa Barshim; QAT | 2.43 m	Bohdan Bondarenko; UKR | 2.40 m	Ivan Ukhov; RUS | DQ	Derek Drouin; CAN | 2.31 m	Erik Kynard; USA | 2.31 m	Andrii Protsenko; UKR | 2.31 m	Naoto Tobe; JPN | 2.31 m	Andrei Churyla; BLR | 2.25 m
Men's Pole Vault	Renaud Lavillenie; FRA | 5.93 m	Robert Sobera; POL | 5.65 m	Konstantinos Filippidis; GRE | 5.65 m	Mark Hollis; USA | 5.65 m	Changrui Xue; CHN | 5.65 m	Piotr Lisek; POL | 5.65 m	Paweł Wojciechowski; POL | 5.55 m	Luke Cutts; GBR | 5.55 m
Men's Long Jump	Godfrey Khotso Mokoena; RSA | 8.19 m	Ignisious Gaisah; NED | 8.06 m	Christian Taylor; USA | 8.06 m	Michael Hartfield; USA | 8.03 m	Jinzhe Li; CHN | 8.01 m	Tyrone Smith; BER | 7.83 m	Kafétien Gomis; FRA | 7.82 m	Zarck Visser; RSA | 7.79 m
Men's Discus Throw	Robert Harting; GER | 67.57 m	Piotr Małachowski; POL | 67.35 m	Gerd Kanter; EST | 65.81 m	Robert Urbanek; POL | 65.58 m	Martin Wierig; GER | 64.72 m	Philip Milanov; BEL | 63.04 m	Vikas Gowda; IND | 62.90 m	Benn Harradine; AUS | 62.38 m
Women's 200m (+0.1 m/s)	Allyson Felix; USA | 22.02	Myriam Soumaré; FRA | 22.11	Dafne Schippers; NED | 22.30	Joanna Atkins; USA | 22.58	Anthonique Strachan; BAH | 22.58	Blessing Okagbare; NGR | 22.60	Jeneba Tarmoh; USA | 22.64	Jodie Williams; GBR | 22.92
Women's 400m	Sanya Richards-Ross; USA | 49.98	Stephenie Ann McPherson; JAM | 50.12	Novlene Williams-Mills; JAM | 50.42	Olha Zemlyak; UKR | 51.07	Libania Grenot; ITA | 51.15	Natasha Hastings; USA | 51.24	Francena McCorory; USA | 51.44	Christine Day; JAM | 51.57
Women's 800m	Brenda Martinez; USA | 1:58.84	Lynsey Sharp; GBR | 1:58.94	Eunice Jepkoech Sum; KEN | 1:58.94	Marina Arzamasova; BLR | 2:00.37	Janeth Jepkosgei; KEN | 2:00.79	Sanne Verstegen-Wolters; NED | 2:00.99	Tigst Assefa; ETH | 2:01.06	Maggie Vessey; USA | 2:01.92
Women's 3000m	Mercy Cherono; KEN | 8:28.95	Sifan Hassan; NED | 8:29.38	Genzebe Dibaba; ETH | 8:29.41	Jenny Simpson; USA | 8:29.58	Shannon Rowbury; USA | 8:29.93	Viola Jelagat Kibiwot; KEN | 8:30.14	Stacey Chepkemboi Ndiwa; KEN | 8:30.54	Janet Kisa; KEN | 8:32.66
Women's 400mH	Kaliese Carter; JAM | 54.12	Denisa Rosolová; CZE | 54.54	Eilidh Doyle; GBR | 54.76	Hanna Titimets; UKR | 54.95	Cassandra Tate; USA | 55.04	Georganne Moline; USA | 55.16	Axelle Dauwens; BEL | 55.56	Kemi Adekoya; BRN | 55.60
Women's Triple Jump	Caterine Ibarguen; COL | 14.98 m	Olha Saladukha; UKR | 14.53 m	Yekaterina Koneva; RUS | 14.40 m	Kimberly Williams; JAM | 14.25 m	Yosiris Urrutia; COL | 14.21 m	Irina Gumenyuk; RUS | 14.19 m	Olga Rypakova; KAZ | 14.04 m	Alsu Murtazina; RUS | 13.87 m
Women's Shot Put	Valerie Adams; NZL | 20.59 m	Christina Schwanitz; GER | 19.86 m	Michelle Carter; USA | 19.73 m	Cleopatra Borel; TTO | 19.13 m	Yevgeniya Kolodko; RUS | DQ	Anita Márton; HUN | 18.23 m	Felisha Johnson; USA | 18.13 m	Aliona Dubitskaya; BLR | DQ
Women's Javelin Throw	Barbora Špotáková; CZE | 67.99 m	Sunette Viljoen; RSA | 64.30 m	Kathryn Mitchell; AUS | 62.93 m	Linda Stahl; GER | 60.64 m	Hanna Hatsko; UKR | 59.10 m	Madara Palameika; LAT | 58.68 m	Martina Ratej; SLO | 58.61 m	Katharina Molitor; GER | 55.48 m
