= Alana Boyd =

Australian pole vaulter (born 1984)

Alana Quade
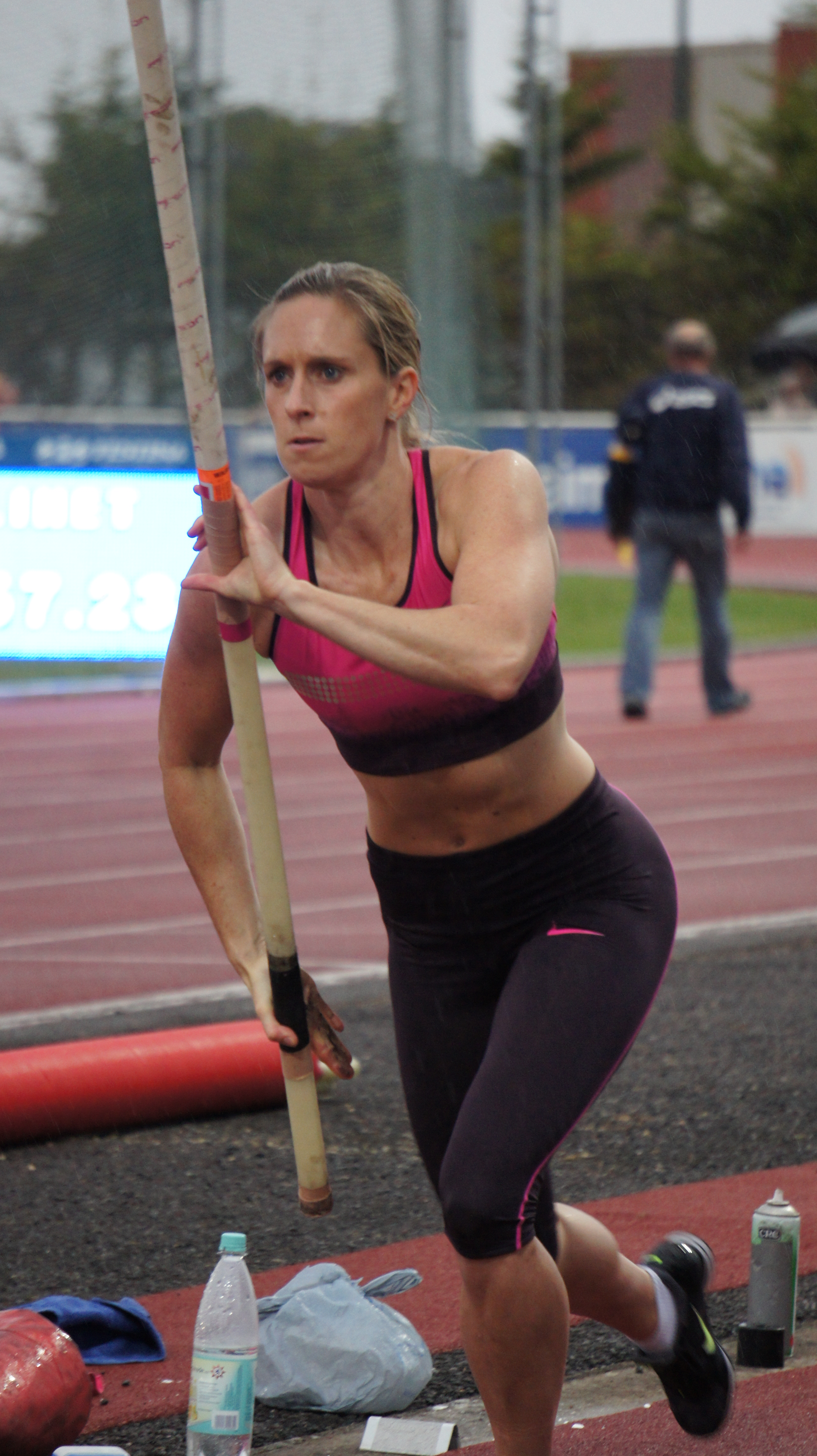

Personal information
- Nationality: Australian
- Born: Alana Boyd; 10 May 1984 (age 42) Melbourne, Australia
- Spouse: Ryan Quade (m. 2016)

Sport
- Country: Australia
- Sport: Pole vault
Medal record
Women's athletics
Representing Australia
Commonwealth Games
Gold medal – first place	2010 Delhi	Pole vault
Gold medal – first place	2014 Glasgow	Pole vault

Alana Quade (née Boyd, born 10 May 1984) is a former Australian pole vaulter and Olympian.

== Athletic career ==
The 2008 Australian Champion, Boyd was selected for the 2007 World Championships, but did not make the final. She did not make the final at the 2008 Summer Olympics, but did at the 2012 Summer Olympics, where she finished in 11th place. Boyd won the gold medal for the women's pole vault at the 2010 Commonwealth Games in Delhi, which she retained at the 2014 Commonwealth Games in Glasgow. She also reached the final of the 2012 Indoor World Championships, finishing in 9th.

Her personal best jump of 4.81 metres, achieved in July 2016 on the Sunshine Coast, was an Australian record at the time.

== Personal life ==
Boyd married Ryan Quade on 24 September 2016, with whom she has two children.

Boyd's parents are both former Australian Olympians and her participation in the 2008 Beijing Olympics marked the first time a child of two former Olympians competed in an Australian Olympic team. Her mother Denise (née Robertson) won the gold medal for 200 metres at the 1978 Commonwealth Games in Edmonton and ran in three Olympic finals. Her father and coach Ray Boyd was also a Commonwealth Games champion and double-Olympic pole vaulter. Alana has two siblings, who have also represented Australia internationally: Jacinta, a 6.64-metre long jumper, and Matt, a 5.35-metre pole vaulter.
