= Curtis Mitchell =

American sprinter (born 1989)

Personal information
- Nationality: American
- Born: March 11, 1989 (age 37) Daytona Beach, Florida, U.S. 629 Willie Daytona Beach
- Height: 6 ft 4 in (193 cm)

Sport
- Country: United States
- Sport: Track & Field
- Event(s): 100 m, 200 m

Achievements and titles
- Personal best(s): 100 m: 10.25 (+1.3); 200 m: 19.97 (+0.0)
Medal record
Men's athletics
Representing the United States
World Championships
| Bronze medal – third place | 2013 Moscow | 200 m |
NACAC U-23 Championships
| Gold medal – first place | 2010 Miramar | 4 × 100 meters |

Curtis Mitchell (born March 11, 1989) is an American athlete, who specialises in the 100 and 200 meters.

== Career ==
Mitchell was a 2008 & 2009 junior college four-time outdoor all-American and state champion in the 100 and 200 m at Southwestern College in Chula Vista, California, where he was coached by Olympian Philam Garcia.

Mitchell had a successful collegiate career for Texas A&M University. At the 2010 NCAA Indoor Championships he won the 200 m and was part of Texas A&M's winning team in the 4 × 400 m relay. His time in the 200 m was 20.38 s, the best indoor time in the world that year and a Texas A&M record. At the outdoor championships that year he placed second to Rondel Sorrillo in the 200 m, helping Texas A&M to their second consecutive NCAA team title.

In 2010, Mitchell represented the United States at the NACAC Under-23 Championships in Miramar, Florida, winning gold in both 200 m and the 4 × 100 m relay. In the 200 m semi-finals he clocked a wind-legal personal best of 19.99 s, placing him seventh in the world that year.

Mitchell turned professional in January 2011, forgoing his final year of collegiate eligibility to sign with Adidas and join the training group of two-time World Champion Tyson Gay.

Mitchell won bronze at the 2013 IAAF World Championships behind Usain Bolt and Warren Weir in a time of 20.04 seconds.
