= Georganne Moline =

American hurdler (born 1990)

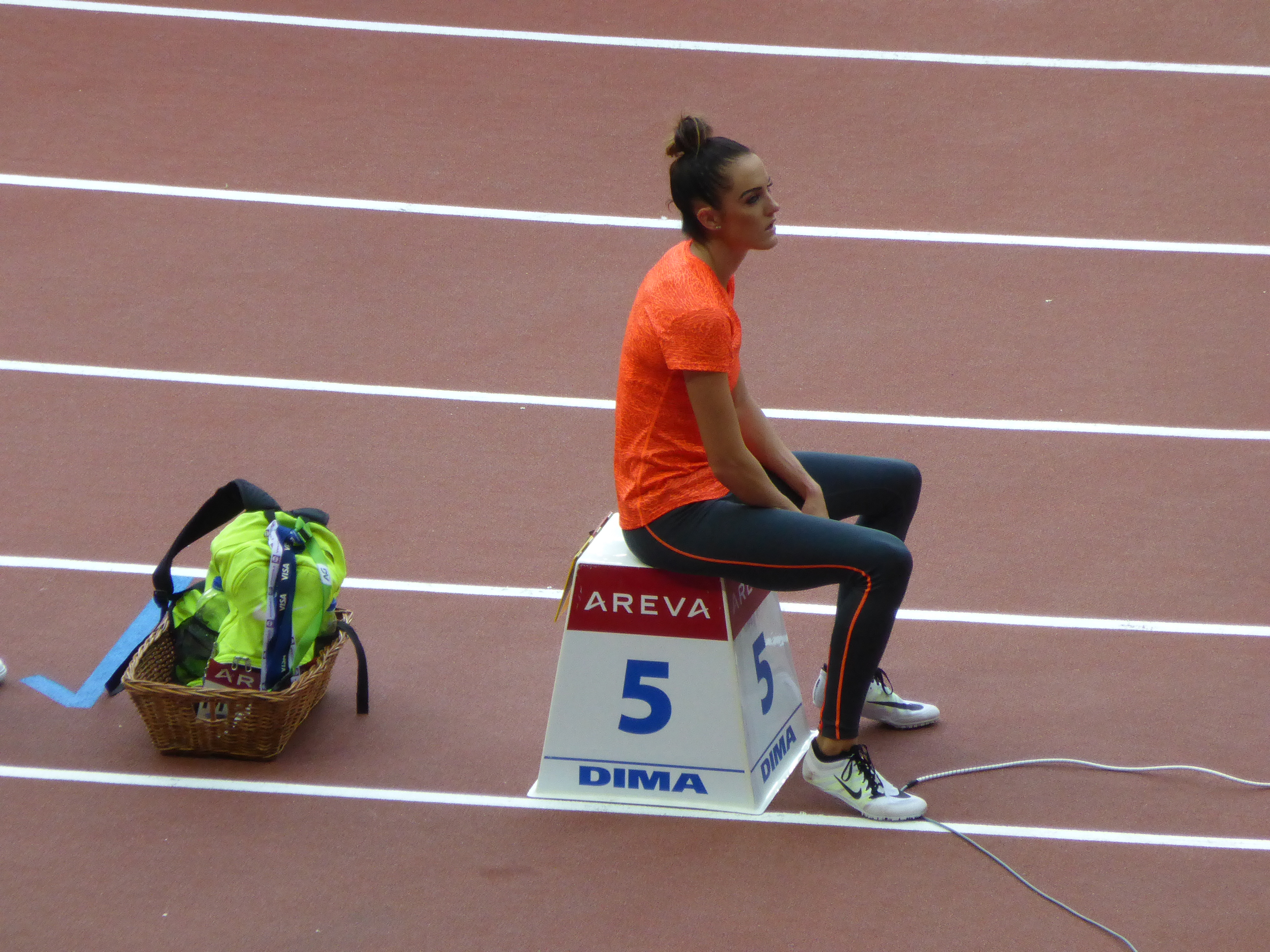
- Moline in 2015

Personal information
- Full name: Georganne Rochelle Moline
- Born: March 6, 1990 (age 36) Missoula, Montana, U.S.
- Height: 5 ft 9 in (175 cm)
- Weight: 130 lb (59 kg)

Sport
- Country: United States
- Sport: Track and field
- Events: 400 metres hurdles, 400 metres
- Coached by: Fred Harvey

Achievements and titles
- Personal best: 400m hurdles: 53.14
Medal record
World Indoor Championships
Gold medal – first place	2018 Birmingham	4 × 400 m relay
NACAC Championships
Bronze medal – third place	2018 Toronto	400 m hurdles

Georganne Rochelle Moline (born March 6, 1990) is an American hurdler who specializes in the 400 metres hurdles and 400 metres. She won a spot in the 2012 Summer Olympics in the 400 meter hurdles.

Moline graduated from Thunderbird High School in Phoenix, Arizona. During her junior and senior year of high school, she was the 4A-1 State Champion in the 100 meter hurdles and 300 meter hurdles. Because of a stress fracture, Moline redshirted the outdoor season of her freshman year at the University of Arizona. At the University of Arizona, she anchored the 4 × 400 relay, setting indoor and outdoor school records in 2010. During the 2012 outdoor college season, Moline won the 400 m hurdles title at the Pac-12 Championships. She was undefeated in every 400 m hurdles event she entered that season, until she fell in the preliminary round of the NCAA championship.

At the 2012 U.S. Olympic trials, she placed second in 400 m hurdles with a time of 54.33 to make the Olympic team. Moline made the Olympic team at age 22, after completing her junior year of college.

At the Olympics, Moline won her 400 m hurdles preliminary heat with a time of 54.31, a new personal best. She placed second in her semifinal to automatically qualify for the Olympic final. Moline finished fifth in the Olympic 400 meter hurdles final, again setting a personal best with a time of 53.92.
