= 2023 World Athletics Championships – Men's 800 metres =

Men's 800 metres at the 2023 World Championships
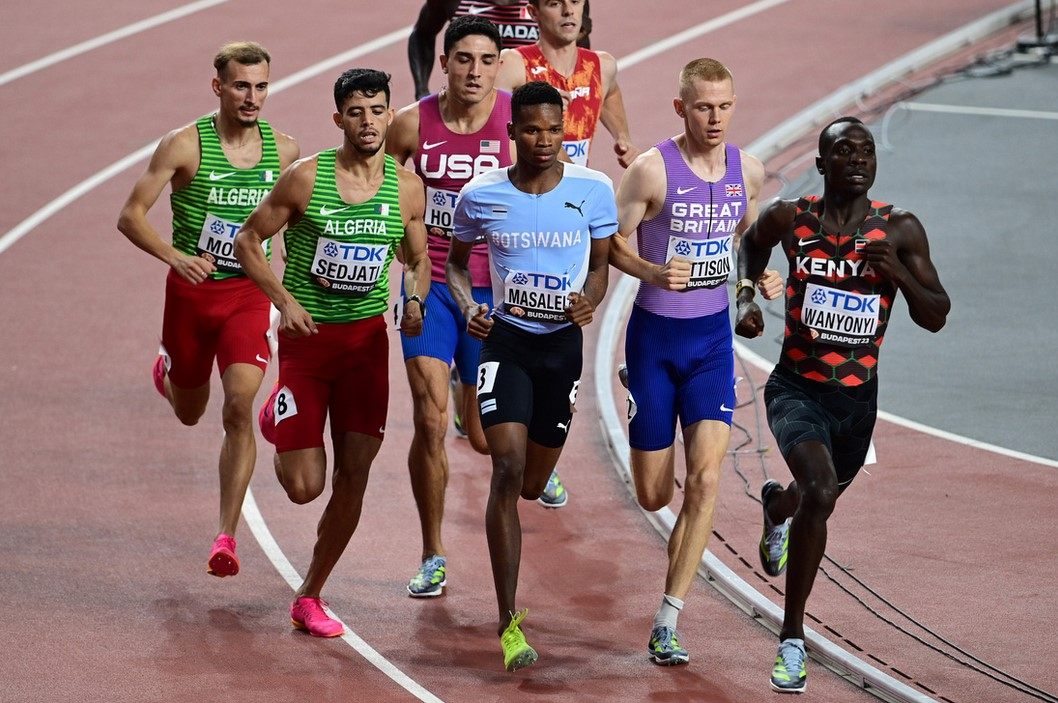
- Final of the event
- Venue: National Athletics Centre
- Dates: 22 August (heats); 24 August (semi-finals); 26 August (final)
- Winning time: 1:44.24

Medalists
gold medal	Marco Arop	Canada
silver medal	Emmanuel Wanyonyi	Kenya
bronze medal	Ben Pattison	Great Britain

The men's 800 metres at the 2023 World Athletics Championships was held at the National Athletics Centre in Budapest, Hungary from 22 to 26 August 2023.

== Summary ==
Several renowned athletes failed to progress past the heats. Olympic and defending champion, Emmanuel Korir, Olympic silver medalist and 2019 bronze medalist Ferguson Rotich, 2019 bronze medalist Amel Tuka, 2016 Olympic bronze medalist Clayton Murphy and 2022 Commonwealth Games silver medalist Peter Bol all failed to qualify for the semifinals. Returning silver medalist Djamel Sedjati was lucky to be in the slow second semi. His second place automatic qualifier of 1:44.49 was the slowest time to make the final. Ben Pattison was the slowest qualifier on time with 1:44.23. Emmanuel Wanyonyi was the fastest qualifier with 1:43.83.

The final started with Pattison the first to the break line, but Wanyonyi pushed the back stretch to take the lead before the next turn, then used his position to keep the pace slow taking the bell at 52.68. In the 2022 Olympic final Arop hit the bell in 52.05 and relinquished the lead on the home stretch. This year he was dead last after 400m. Halfway through the penultimate turn, Arop moved out to get some running room. Shifting gears as he hit the backstretch, Arop ran past the field, taking the lead at the beginning of the final turn and he kept going opening up a 2 metre lead through the turn. Coming off the turn, the others lined up three abreast behind Wanyonyi to sprint for home, but Arop was way out front and pulling away. Wanyonyi made a late run, pulling back a metre from Arop's lead, but still finished 2 metres back. Two more metres back, Pattison hit the line barely ahead of Adrián Ben and Slimane Moula for bronze. Sedjati was later disqualified for a lane violation.

== Records ==
Before the competition records were as follows:

Record	Athlete & Nat.	Perf.	Location	Date
World record	David Rudisha (KEN)	1:40.91	London, United Kingdom	9 August 2012
Championship record	Donavan Brazier (USA)	1:42.34	Doha, Qatar	1 October 2019
World Leading	Wyclife Kinyamal (KEN)	1:43.22	Doha, Qatar	21 July 2023
African Record	David Rudisha (KEN)	1:40.91	London, United Kingdom	9 August 2012
Asian Record	Yusuf Saad Kamel (BHR)	1:42.79	Fontvieille, Monaco	29 July 2008
European Record	Wilson Kipketer (DEN)	1:41.11	Cologne, Germany	24 August 1997
North, Central American and Caribbean record	Donavan Brazier (USA)	1:42.34	Doha, Qatar	1 October 2019
Oceanian record	Joseph Deng (AUS)	1:43.99	Paris, France	8 July 2023
South American Record	Joaquim Cruz (BRA)	1:41.77	Cologne, West Germany	26 August 1984

== Qualification standard ==
The standard to qualify automatically for entry was 1:44.70.

== Schedule ==
The event schedule, in local time (UTC+2), was as follows:

Date	Time	Round
22 August	19:20	Heats
24 August	20:50	Semi-finals
26 August	20:30	Final

== Results ==
=== Heats ===
The first 3 athletes in each heat (Q) and the next 3 fastest (q) qualify for the semi-finals.

Rank	Heat	Name	Nationality	Time	Notes
1	1	Emmanuel Wanyonyi	Kenya	1:44.92	Q
2	7	Marco Arop	Canada	1:45.05	Q
3	1	Gabriel Tual	France	1:45.10	Q
4	7	Simone Barontini	Italy	1:45.21	Q
5	6	Abdelati El Guesse	Morocco	1:45.24	Q
6	7	Yanis Meziane	France	1:45.30	Q
7	1	Catalin Tecuceanu	Italy	1:45.31	Q
8	4	Adrián Ben	Spain	1:45.24	Q
9	2	Mateusz Borkowski	Poland	1:45.40	Q
10	6	Andreas Kramer	Sweden	1:45.42	Q
11	2	Max Burgin	Great Britain & N.I.	1:45.43	Q
12	2	Joseph Deng	Australia	1:45.48	Q
13	4	Bryce Hoppel	United States	1:45.56	Q
14	1	Tshepiso Masalela	Botswana	1:45.60	q
15	4	Daniel Rowden	Great Britain & N.I.	1:45.67	Q
16	2	Mark English	Ireland	1:45.71	q, SB
17	6	Slimane Moula	Algeria	1:45.76	Q
17	4	Filip Ostrowski	Poland	1:45.76	q
19	6	Francesco Pernici	Italy	1:45.89	
20	7	Joonas Rinne	Finland	1:45.93	
21	2	Brad Mathas	New Zealand	1:45.95	
22	4	Abdullahi Hassan	Canada	1:46.33	
23	5	Benjamin Robert	France	1:46.45	Q
24	4	Ferguson Cheruiyot Rotich	Kenya	1:46.53	
25	5	Ben Pattison	Great Britain & N.I.	1:46.57	Q
26	4	Marino Bloudek	Croatia	1:46.63	
27	5	Mohamed Attaoui	Spain	1:46.65	Q
28	6	Peter Bol	Australia	1:46.75	
29	5	Emmanuel Kipkurui Korir	Kenya	1:46.78	
30	6	James Preston	New Zealand	1:46.84	
31	5	Abdessalem Ayouni	Tunisia	1:46.85	
32	6	Handal Roban	Saint Vincent and the Grenadines	1:46.86	
33	5	Clayton Murphy	United States	1:47.06	
34	7	Balázs Vindics	Hungary	1:47.18	
35	2	Dániel Huller	Hungary	1:47.41	
36	3	Ngeno Kipngetich	Kenya	1:47.63	Q
37	7	Eduardo Ribeiro	Brazil	1:47.75	
38	5	Abedin Mujezinović	Bosnia and Herzegovina	1:47.76	
39	7	Oussama Nabil	Morocco	1:47.79	
40	3	Djamel Sedjati	Algeria	1:47.87	Q
41	3	Saúl Ordóñez	Spain	1:47.97	Q
42	7	Abdullah Al-Yaari	Yemen	1:47.98	PB
43	3	Isaiah Harris	United States	1:48.00	
44	3	John Fitzsimons	Ireland	1:48.20	
45	1	Ryan Sánchez	Puerto Rico	1:48.24	
46	6	Alex Beddoes	Cook Islands	1:48.31	
47	5	Riley McGown	Australia	1:48.38	
48	3	Ebrahim Alzofairi	Kuwait	1:48.41	
49	2	Tom Dradriga	Uganda	1:48.60	
50	3	John Rivera	Puerto Rico	1:48.83	
51	3	Amel Tuka	Bosnia and Herzegovina	1:49.01	
52	1	Mohamed Ali Gouaned	Algeria	1:49.16	
53	1	Krishan Kumar	India	1:50.36	
54	3	Allan Ngitsi Chirwa	Malawi	1:51.62	PB
55	4	Ole Jakob Solbu	Norway	1:51.66	
56	1	Hein Htet Aung	Myanmar	1:53.63	PB
57	7	Mohammed Dwedar	Palestine	1:55.45	PB
58	1	Manuel Belo	Timor-Leste	1:58.32	
59	6	Justice Dreischor	Aruba	1:59.56	
60	5	Faustino Prieto Alfaro	Equatorial Guinea	2:04.20	PB
	2	Navasky Anderson	Jamaica		DQ

=== Semi-finals ===
The first 2 athletes in each heat (Q) and the next 2 fastest (q) qualify for the final.

Rank	Heat	Name	Nationality	Time	Notes
1	3	Emmanuel Wanyonyi	Kenya	1:43.83	Q
2	3	Adrián Ben	Spain	1:43.92	Q, PB
3	1	Slimane Moula	Algeria	1:43.93	Q
4	2	Marco Arop	Canada	1:44.02	Q
5	3	Bryce Hoppel	United States	1:44.04	q
6	1	Tshepiso Masalela	Botswana	1:44.14	Q, PB
7	1	Ben Pattison	Great Britain & N.I.	1:44.23	q
8	1	Mateusz Borkowski	Poland	1:44.30	PB
9	3	Yanis Meziane	France	1:44.30	PB
10	3	Simone Barontini	Italy	1:44.34	PB
11	1	Mohamed Attaoui	Spain	1:44.35	PB
12	1	Benjamin Robert	France	1:44.38	
13	2	Djamel Sedjati	Algeria	1:44.49	Q
14	1	Abdelati El Guesse	Morocco	1:44.55	
15	3	Andreas Kramer	Sweden	1:44.57	SB
16	2	Saúl Ordóñez	Spain	1:44.74	
17	2	Catalin Tecuceanu	Italy	1:44.79	PB
18	2	Gabriel Tual	France	1:44.83	
19	3	Mark English	Ireland	1:45.14	SB
20	2	Filip Ostrowski	Poland	1:45.30	PB
21	2	Daniel Rowden	Great Britain & N.I.	1:45.38	
22	2	Ngeno Kipngetich	Kenya	1:45.56	
23	3	Max Burgin	Great Britain & N.I.	1:47.60	
24	1	Joseph Deng	Australia	1:48.12	

=== Final ===
The final was started on 26 August at 20:30.

Rank	Name	Nationality	Time	Notes
1st place, gold medalist(s)	Marco Arop	Canada	1:44.24	
2nd place, silver medalist(s)	Emmanuel Wanyonyi	Kenya	1:44.53	
3rd place, bronze medalist(s)	Ben Pattison	Great Britain & N.I.	1:44.83	
4	Adrián Ben	Spain	1:44.91	
5	Slimane Moula	Algeria	1:44.95	
6	Tshepiso Masalela	Botswana	1:45.57	
7	Bryce Hoppel	United States	1:46.02	
8	Djamel Sedjati	Algeria	DQ	
