= 2022 World Athletics Indoor Championships – Men's 800 metres =

Men's 800 metres at the 2022 World Athletics Indoor Championships
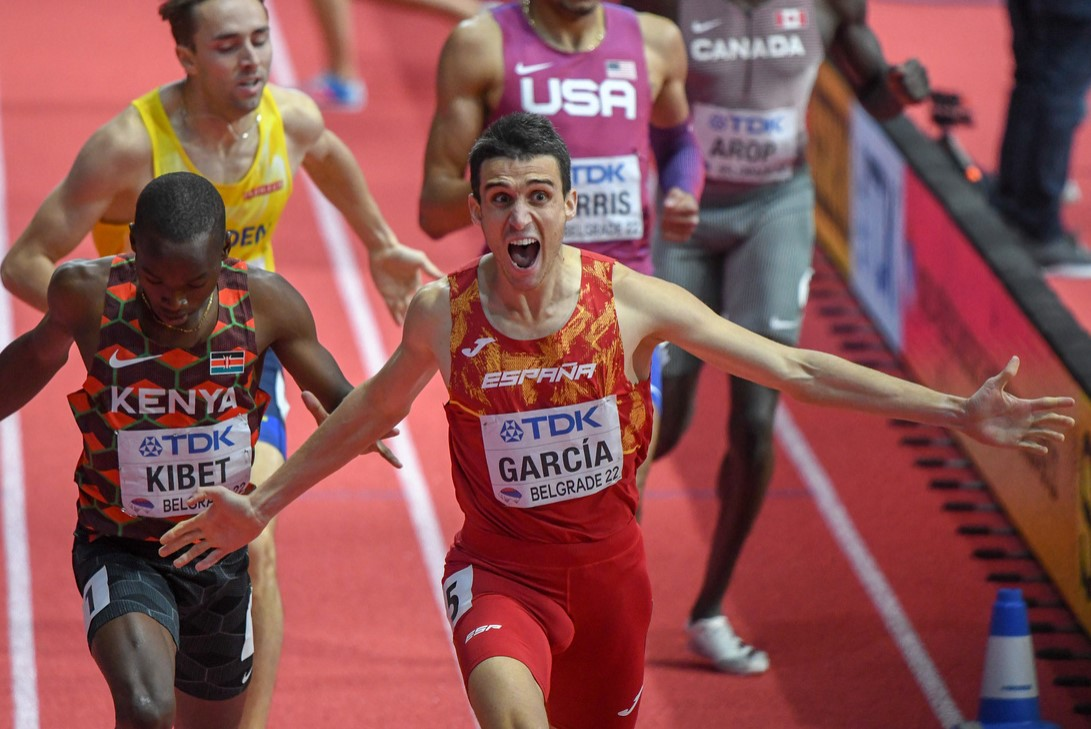
- Mariano García celebrating shortly after winning the final.
- Venue: Štark Arena
- Dates: 18–19 March
- Competitors: 23 from 17 nations
- Winning time: 1:46.20

Medalists
gold medal	Mariano García	Spain
silver medal	Noah Kibet	Kenya
bronze medal	Bryce Hoppel	United States

The men's 800 metres at the 2022 World Athletics Indoor Championships took place on 18 and 19 March 2022.

== Summary ==
Mariano García came into the World Championships as the world leader for 2022. No podium athlete returned from the distant 2018 Championships and with Elliot Giles failing to start the heats, only Álvaro de Arriba returned from the previous final.

With 8 men on a 6 lane track running the first turn in lanes, Marco Arop rushed from his shared position to take a clear lead at the break. Andreas Kramer and Noah Kibet fell in line behind as Arop took the field through a 24.04 first lap with Garcia trailing the field. For the second lap, most everybody stayed in the same position, except for Garcia who stepped into lane 2 and cruised past the string of athletes into third place. Arop's split at the halfway point was a searing 50.50. Down the penultimate back stretch, Garcia worked his way past Kramer to assume his position second in line. Splitting 1:17.83 at 3 laps, Arop was not blazing as fast a trail. At the bell, Kibet brought his kick and pounced on Kramer, setting sights on Garcia and Arop. As Kibet approached, Garcia pounced on Arop, both passing with 100m to go. With less than a metre separation, Kibet looked prepared to make his final attack coming off the turn. But when the attack came, Garcia was stronger holding off Kibet, even expanding his lead to the line. Behind them, Bryce Hoppel was out in lane 3 running past Kramer and chasing them to the line. Even faster, in lane 4, de Arriba was chasing Hoppel trying to get bronze. The indoor straightaway proved too short for that much drama.

== Results ==
=== Heats ===
Qualification: First 2 in each heat (Q) and the next 0 fastest (q) advance to the Final

The heats were started on 18 March at 12:50.

Rank	Heat	Name	Nationality	Time	Notes
1	4	Isaiah Harris	United States	1:47.00	Q
2	4	Álvaro de Arriba	Spain	1:47.97	Q
3	4	Samuel Chapple	Netherlands	1:48.09	
4	2	Marco Arop	Canada	1:48.13	Q
5	4	Collins Kipruto	Kenya	1:48.18	
6	2	Andreas Kramer	Sweden	1:48.25	Q
7	1	Noah Kibet	Kenya	1:48.31	Q
8	3	Mariano García	Spain	1:48.32	Q
9	3	Eliott Crestan	Belgium	1:48.53	Q
10	2	Mostafa Smaili	Morocco	1:48.57	
11	4	Marc Reuther	Germany	1:48.63	
12	1	Bryce Hoppel	United States	1:48.77	Q
13	4	Charlie Hunter	Australia	1:49.07	
14	1	Guy Learmonth	Great Britain	1:49.13	
15	3	Djamel Sejati	Algeria	1:49.22	
16	1	Filip Šnejdr	Czech Republic	1:49.29	
17	2	Balázs Vindics	Hungary	1:49.52	
18	1	Aurèle Vandeputte	Belgium	1:49.59	
19	3	Tony van Diepen	Netherlands	1:49.80	
20	3	Alex Amankwah	Ghana	1:49.96	
21	3	Charlie Grice	Great Britain	1:50.17	SB
22	2	Mark English	Ireland	1:51.35	
23	1	Quamel Prince	Guyana	1:55.85	
	2	Elliot Giles	Great Britain	DNS	

=== Final ===
The final was started 19 March at 19:10.

Rank	Name	Nationality	Time	Notes
1st place, gold medalist(s)	Mariano García	Spain	1:46.20	
2nd place, silver medalist(s)	Noah Kibet	Kenya	1:46.35	
3rd place, bronze medalist(s)	Bryce Hoppel	United States	1:46.51	
4	Álvaro de Arriba	Spain	1:46.58	
5	Andreas Kramer	Sweden	1:46.76	
6	Eliott Crestan	Belgium	1:46.78	
7	Isaiah Harris	United States	1:47.00	
8	Marco Arop	Canada	1:47.58	
