= Athletics at the 2020 Summer Olympics – Men's 800 metres =

Men's 800 metres at the Games of the XXXII Olympiad
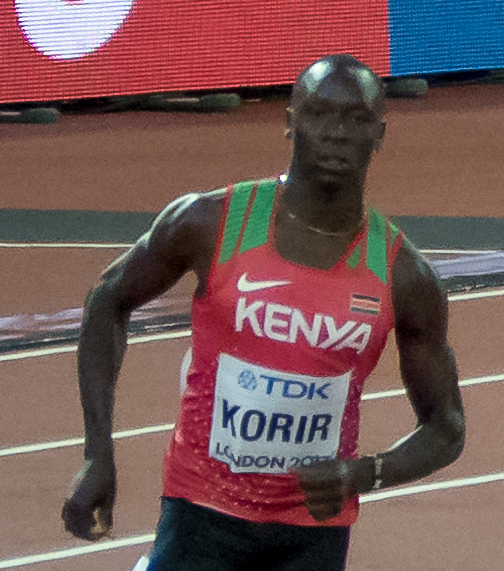
- Gold medalist Emmanuel Korir (shown at 2017 World Championships)
- Venue: Japan National Stadium
- Dates: 31 July 2021 (round 1); 1 August 2021 (semifinals); 4 August 2021 (final)
- Competitors: 47 from 29 nations
- Winning time: 1:45.06

Medalists
1st place, gold medalist(s)		Emmanuel Korir	Kenya
2nd place, silver medalist(s)		Ferguson Rotich	Kenya
3rd place, bronze medalist(s)		Patryk Dobek	Poland

Official Video Highlights

The men's 800 metres event at the 2020 Summer Olympics took place from 31 July to 4 August 2021 at the Japan National Stadium. In total 48 athletes were to start, but only 47 (from 29 nations) actually did. Emmanuel Korir of Kenya won the event by 0.17 seconds, with his countryman Ferguson Rotich taking silver. It was the fourth consecutive victory in the men's 800 metres for Kenya. Patryk Dobek earned bronze, giving Poland its first medal in the event.

== Summary ==
The 800 metres was far less predictable than other events. World record holder and double Olympic Champion, David Rudisha was not back to defend the title. Silver medalist Taoufik Makhloufi also did not make it to Tokyo, though bronze medalist Clayton Murphy did. 2019 World Champion Donavan Brazier failed to qualify at the US Trials. Brazier had also been number 1 ranked in 2020, with his teammate Bryce Hoppel number two. 2012 silver medalist Nijel Amos had the world leading time while beating Emmanuel Korir in Monaco. World Championship silver medalist, Amel Tuka, bronze medalist Ferguson Rotich and 2017 World Champion Pierre-Ambroise Bosse were also in the field.

Patryk Dobek, Peter Bol, and Rotich were the semi-final winners, all qualifiers fairly evenly matched by time, except Amos who tripped and tripped over NCAA Champion Isaiah Jewett as both were about to kick for home. Jewett helped Amos to his feet in a sportsmanship scene that was later repeated in commercials. The two jogged across the finish line, Amos being granted a place in the final by the referee.

Nine athletes on a 9 lane track, all evenly matched, the start had what would be expected, a tight pack trying to sort out position. Emmanuel Korir took the inside position, Bol directly to his outside but they were all running, almost jogging well within their capabilities. The first time down the home stretch, they lined up with six men shoulder to shoulder a step behind Bol. Bol took the bell at 53.76 predicating a fast second lap for gold. Through the turn, the next 100 metres produced some separation, Bol leading Korir, Amos and Patryk Dobek in a lead group, Rotich ahead of the second pack trying to bridge the gap. The kickers, Tuka and Murphy at the back of the pack, ready to pounce. Down the backstretch, Korir and Dobek tightened up on Bol, Amos going backward. Through the final turn, Korir took the longer way in lane 2 to have running room around Bol. The entire pack tightened up again, Rotich hugging the rail, Dobek following Korir and Amos trying to widen up on Dobek, with Tuka and Murphy swinging wide to sprint down the outside. Everybody was in their place for the sprint to home. Korir opened up a gap as Dobek ran down lane 2 to get past Bol on the inside. Leaning and rocking side to side awkwardly, Rotich kept gaining, squeezing between Dobek and Bol. Everybody was in full sprint, but after Dobek got past Bol, only the two Kenyans were making forward progress relative to each other. The kickers were not running past burnt out runners because they were not burnt out from the fast first lap. The World and Olympic Record time passed and Korir still had over 30 metres to run. Bol moved backward toward the pack, the three medalists distinct. Rotich gained and leaned at the finish but he was still over a metre away from catching Korir for gold. Dobek was elated to get bronze.

== Background ==
This was the 29th appearance of the event, which is one of 12 athletics events to have been held at every Summer Olympics.

For the first time in Olympic history, no nations appeared in the event for the first time. Great Britain made its 28th appearance, most among all nations, having had no competitors in the event only in the 1904 Games in St. Louis.

== Qualification ==
A National Olympic Committee (NOC) could enter up to 3 qualified athletes in the men's 800 metres event if all athletes meet the entry standard or qualify by ranking during the qualifying period. (The limit of 3 has been in place since the 1930 Olympic Congress.) The qualifying standard is 1:45.20. This standard was "set for the sole purpose of qualifying athletes with exceptional performances unable to qualify through the IAAF World Rankings pathway." The world rankings, based on the average of the best five results for the athlete over the qualifying period and weighted by the importance of the meet, will then be used to qualify athletes until the cap of 48 is reached.

The qualifying period was originally from 1 May 2019 to 29 June 2020. Due to the COVID-19 pandemic, the period was suspended from 6 April 2020 to 30 November 2020, with the end date extended to 29 June 2021. The world rankings period start date was also changed from 1 May 2019 to 30 June 2020; athletes who had met the qualifying standard during that time were still qualified, but those using world rankings would not be able to count performances during that time. The qualifying time standards could be obtained in various meets during the given period that have the approval of the IAAF. Both indoor and outdoor meets are eligible. The most recent Area Championships may be counted in the ranking, even if not during the qualifying period.

NOCs can also use their universality place—each NOC can enter one male athlete regardless of time if they had no male athletes meeting the entry standard for an athletics event—in the 800 metres.

Entry number: 48. None qualified by ranking.

Qualification standard	No. of athletes	NOC	Nominated athletes
Entry standard – 1:45.20
Entry standard – 1:45.20	3	Australia	Peter Bol; Charlie Hunter; Jeff Riseley
Entry standard – 1:45.20	3	France	Pierre-Ambroise Bosse; Benjamin Robert; Gabriel Tual
Entry standard – 1:45.20	3	Great Britain	Oliver Dustin; Elliot Giles; Daniel Rowden
Entry standard – 1:45.20	3	Kenya	Emmanuel Korir; Ferguson Rotich; Michael Saruni
Entry standard – 1:45.20	3	Morocco	Abdelati El Guesse; Oussama Nabil; Mostafa Smaili
Entry standard – 1:45.20	2	Poland	Mateusz Borkowski; Patryk Dobek; ~~Marcin Lewandowski~~
Entry standard – 1:45.20	3	Puerto Rico	Andrés Arroyo; Ryan Sánchez; Wesley Vázquez
Entry standard – 1:45.20	3	Spain	Adrián Ben; Saúl Ordóñez; Pablo Sánchez-Valladares
Entry standard – 1:45.20	3	United States	Bryce Hoppel; Isaiah Jewett; Clayton Murphy
Entry standard – 1:45.20	1	Algeria	Yassine Hethat; ~~Djamel Sejati~~
Entry standard – 1:45.20	2	Canada	Marco Arop; Brandon McBride
Entry standard – 1:45.20	1	Ethiopia	~~Teddese Lemi~~; Melese Nberet
Entry standard – 1:45.20	1	Belgium	Eliott Crestan
Entry standard – 1:45.20	1	Bosnia and Herzegovina	Amel Tuka
Entry standard – 1:45.20	1	Botswana	Nijel Amos
Entry standard – 1:45.20	1	Brazil	Thiago André
Entry standard – 1:45.20	1	Burundi	Éric Nzikwinkunda
Entry standard – 1:45.20	1	Djibouti	Ayanleh Souleiman
Entry standard – 1:45.20	1	Ireland	Mark English
Entry standard – 1:45.20	1	Mexico	Jesús Tonatiú López
Entry standard – 1:45.20	1	Netherlands	Tony van Diepen
Entry standard – 1:45.20	1	Qatar	Abubaker Haydar Abdalla
Entry standard – 1:45.20	1	Sweden	Andreas Kramer
Entry standard – 1:45.20	1	Tunisia	Abdessalem Ayouni
World ranking	0		
Universality Places	1	Andorra	Pol Moya
Universality Places	1	Cook Islands	Alex Beddoes
Universality Places	1	Dominica	Dennick Luke
Universality Places	1	Kosovo	Musa Hajdari
Invitational Places	1	Refugee Olympic Team	James Chiengjiek
Total	48		

== Competition format ==
The event continued to use the three-round format that has been typical (though with exceptions) in the 800 metres since 1912.

== Records ==
Prior to this competition, the existing global and area records were as follows:

World record	David Rudisha (KEN)	1:40.91	London, United Kingdom	9 August 2012
Olympic record	David Rudisha (KEN)	1:40.91	London, United Kingdom	9 August 2012
World Leading	Nijel Amos (BOT)	1:42.91	Fontvieille, Monaco	9 July 2021

Area
Area	Time (s)	Athlete	Nation
Africa (records)	1:40.91 WR	David Rudisha	Kenya
Asia (records)	1:42.79	Yusuf Saad Kamel	Bahrain
Europe (records)	1:41.11	Wilson Kipketer	Denmark
North, Central America and Caribbean (records)	1:42.34	Donavan Brazier	United States
Oceania (records)	1:44.21	Joseph Deng	Australia
South America (records)	1:41.77	Joaquim Cruz	Brazil

The following national records were established during the competition:

Country	Athlete	Round	Time	Notes
Australia	Peter Bol	Round 1	1:44.13	AR
Australia	Peter Bol	Semifinals	1:44.11	AR
Cook Islands	Alex Beddoes	Round 1	1:47.26	
Central African Republic	Francky Mbotto	Round 1	1:48.26	
Tunisia	Abdessalem Ayouni	Semifinals	1:44.99	

== Schedule ==
All times are Japan Standard Time (UTC+9)

The men's 800 metres took place over three separate days.

Date	Time	Round
Saturday, 31 July 2021	9:00	Round 1
Sunday, 1 August 2021	19:00	Semifinals
Wednesday, 4 August 2021	18:30	Final

== Results ==
=== Round 1 ===
Qualification Rules: First 3 in each heat (Q) and the next 6 fastest (q) advance to the semifinals.

==== Heat 1 ====
Rank	Athlete	Nation	Time	Notes
1	Ferguson Rotich	Kenya	1:43.75	Q
2	Peter Bol	Australia	1:44.13	Q, AR
3	Elliot Giles	Great Britain	1:44.49	Q
4	Abdelati El Guesse	Morocco	1:44.84	q, PB
5	Isaiah Jewett	United States	1:45.07	q
6	Tony van Diepen	Netherlands	1:46.03	
7	Pol Moya	Andorra	1:47.44	SB
8	Musa Hajdari	Kosovo	1:48.96	

==== Heat 2 ====
Rank	Athlete	Nation	Time	Notes
1	Marco Arop	Canada	1:45.26	Q
2	Amel Tuka	Bosnia and Herzegovina	1:45.48	Q
3	Gabriel Tual	France	1:45.63	Q
4	Pablo Sánchez-Valladares	Spain	1:46.06	
5	Andreas Kramer	Sweden	1:46.44	
6	Oliver Dustin	Great Britain	1:46.94	
7	Alex Beddoes	Cook Islands	1:47.26	NR
8	Francky Mbotto	Central African Republic	1:48.26	NR

==== Heat 3 ====
Rank	Athlete	Nation	Time	Notes
1	Clayton Murphy	United States	1:45.53	Q
2	Daniel Rowden	Great Britain	1:45.73	(.723), Q
3	Abdessalem Ayouni	Tunisia	1:45.73	(.728), Q, SB
4	Charlie Hunter	Australia	1:45.91	q
5	Saúl Ordóñez	Spain	1:45.98	
6	Brandon McBride	Canada	1:46.32	
7	Melese Nberet	Ethiopia	1:47.80	
8	James Chiengjiek	Refugee Olympic Team	2:02.04	

==== Heat 4 ====
Rank	Athlete	Nation	Time	Notes
1	Nijel Amos	Botswana	1:45.04	Q
2	Michael Saruni	Kenya	1:45.21	Q
3	Adrián Ben	Spain	1:45.30	Q
4	Jeff Riseley	Australia	1:45.41	q
5	Oussama Nabil	Morocco	1:45.64	q
6	Pierre-Ambroise Bosse	France	1:45.97	q
7	Ryan Sánchez	Puerto Rico	1:47.07	
8	Thiago André	Brazil	1:47.75	

==== Heat 5 ====
Rank	Athlete	Nation	Time	Notes
1	Jesús Tonatiú López	Mexico	1:46.14	Q
2	Eliott Crestan	Belgium	1:46.19	Q
3	Patryk Dobek	Poland	1:46.59	Q
4	Mark English	Ireland	1:46.75	
5	Benjamin Robert	France	1:47.12	
6	Eric Nzikwinkunda	Burundi	1:47.97	
7	Andrés Arroyo	Puerto Rico	1:53.09	
8	Dennick Luke	Dominica	1:54.30	

==== Heat 6 ====
Rank	Athlete	Nation	Time	Notes
1	Emmanuel Korir	Kenya	1:45.33	Q
2	Mateusz Borkowski	Poland	1:45.34	Q
3	Bryce Hoppel	United States	1:45.64	Q
4	Mostafa Smaili	Morocco	1:46.05	
5	Yassine Hethat	Algeria	1:46.20	
6	Abubaker Haydar Abdalla	Qatar	1:47.45	
7	Wesley Vázquez	Puerto Rico	1:49.06	SB
—	Ayanleh Souleiman	Djibouti	—	DNS

=== Semifinals ===
Progression rules: First 2 in each heat (Q) and the next 2 fastest (q) advance to the final.

==== Semifinal 1 ====
Rank	Athlete	Nation	Time	Notes
1	Patryk Dobek	Poland	1:44.60	Q
2	Emmanuel Korir	Kenya	1:44.74	Q
3	Jesús Tonatiú López	Mexico	1:44.77	
4	Eliott Crestan	Belgium	1:44.84	PB
5	Bryce Hoppel	United States	1:44.91	
6	Abdessalem Ayouni	Tunisia	1:44.99	NR
7	Charlie Hunter	Australia	1:46.73	
8	Abdelati El Guesse	Morocco	1:46.85	

==== Semifinal 2 ====
Rank	Athlete	Nation	Time	Notes
1	Peter Bol	Australia	1:44.11	Q, AR
2	Clayton Murphy	United States	1:44.18	Q
3	Gabriel Tual	France	1:44.28	q, PB
4	Adrián Ben	Spain	1:44.30	q
5	Daniel Rowden	Great Britain	1:44.35	SB
6	Michael Saruni	Kenya	1:44.55	SB
7	Marco Arop	Canada	1:44.90	
8	Mateusz Borkowski	Poland	1:46.54	

==== Semifinal 3 ====
Rank	Athlete	Nation	Time	Notes
1	Ferguson Rotich	Kenya	1:44.04	Q
2	Amel Tuka	Bosnia and Herzegovina	1:44.53	Q, SB
3	Elliot Giles	Great Britain	1:44.74	
4	Oussama Nabil	Morocco	1:46.42	
5	Jeff Riseley	Australia	1:47.17	
6	Pierre-Ambroise Bosse	France	1:48.62	
7	Isaiah Jewett	United States	2:38.12	
8	Nijel Amos	Botswana	2:38.49	qR

=== Final ===
Rank	Athlete	Nation	Time	Notes
1st place, gold medalist(s)	Emmanuel Korir	Kenya	1:45.06	
2nd place, silver medalist(s)	Ferguson Rotich	Kenya	1:45.23	
3rd place, bronze medalist(s)	Patryk Dobek	Poland	1:45.39	
4	Peter Bol	Australia	1:45.92	
5	Adrián Ben	Spain	1:45.96	
6	Amel Tuka	Bosnia and Herzegovina	1:45.98	
7	Gabriel Tual	France	1:46.03	
8	Nijel Amos	Botswana	1:46.41	
9	Clayton Murphy	United States	1:46.53	
