= Amel Tuka =

Bosnian middle-distance runner

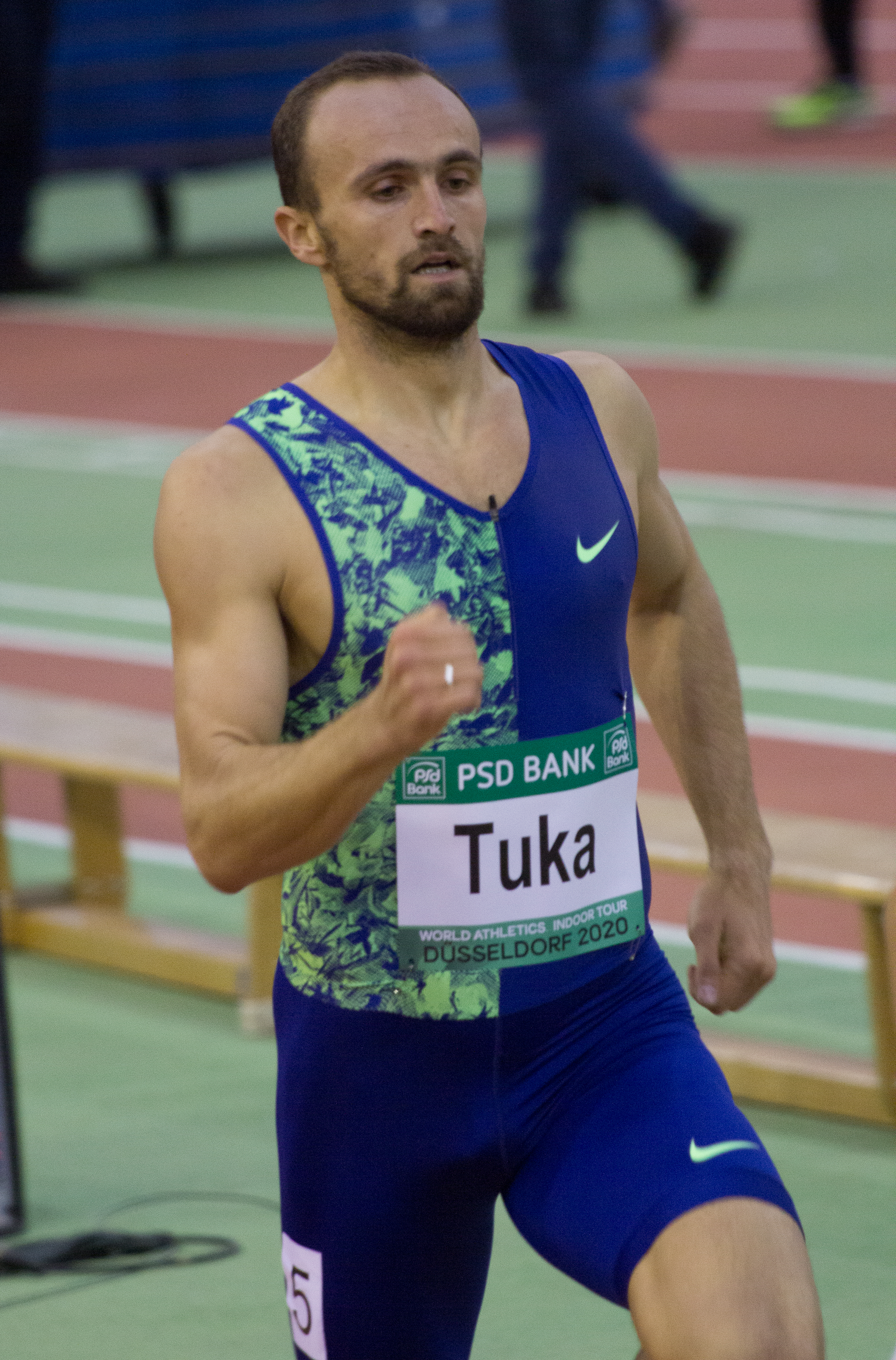
- Tuka at the 2020 PSD Bank Meeting in Düsseldorf

Personal information
- Nationality: Bosnian
- Born: 9 January 1991 (age 35) Kakanj, SR Bosnia and Herzegovina, SFR Yugoslavia
- Height: 1.87 m (6 ft 2 in)
- Weight: 77 kg (170 lb)

Sport
- Country: Bosnia and Herzegovina
- Sport: Track and field
- Event: 800 metres
- Club: AK Zenica
- Coached by: Gianni Ghidini

Achievements and titles
- Olympic finals: 6th - 2020 Summer Olympics
- Highest world ranking: 3
- Personal bests: 400 m: 46.15 NR (2019); 800 m: 1:42.51 NR (Monaco 2015)
Medal record
Men's athletics
Representing Bosnia and Herzegovina
World Championships
Silver medal – second place	2019 Doha	800 m
Bronze medal – third place	2015 Beijing	800 m
European U23 Championships
Bronze medal – third place	2013 Tampere	800 m
- Updated on 28 January 2019

Amel Tuka (born 9 January 1991) is a Bosnian middle-distance runner who competes in the 800 metres. His achievements include a silver medal at the 2019 World Championships as well as a bronze medal at the 2015 World Championships. Tuka holds national records in the 400 m and 800 m disciplines.

On 17 July 2015, with a time of 1:42.51, Tuka positioned himself as the world leader in the men's 800 metres for the year 2015. He subsequently earned his country's first medal in a major athletics championship with his third-place finish in the men's 800 metres at the 2015 World Championships in Athletics. He earned his second medal at the World Championships in 2019, finishing second in the men's 800 metres.

== Athletics career ==
Tuka was recruited by Atletski klub Zenica to train full-time in track and field after winning a low-profile 400m race in Zenica. He became one of the country's leading middle-distance runners, winning medals at regional and European championships. ... Tuka improved again to win in 1:42.51, which at the time made him the eleventh-fastest 800 metres runner in history and the fastest in the world that year. ...

In June 2013, Tuka won the 800 metres race at the 2013 European Team Championships Third League, running a time of 1:51.11. Less than a month later, Tuka earned third place at the 2013 European Athletics U23 Championships in the 800 metres, running a national record time of 1:46.29. After the championships, Tuka moved from his native Bosnia to Verona, Italy to train with coach Gianni Ghidini.

At the 2014 European Athletics Championships, Tuka placed sixth in the men's 800 metres final, breaking his record by running a new personal best of 1:46.12.

On 1 July 2015, Tuka won the men's 800 metres at the 20th Annual International Meeting in Velenje, Slovenia and qualified for the 2016 Summer Olympics by running 1:44.19. On 11 July 2015, he ran even faster, winning the men's 800m in Madrid with a time of 1:43.84. Just six days later at the high-profile Herculis meet in Monaco, Tuka made another major improvement with a win of 1:42.51, making him the eleventh fastest 800 metres runner of all time and the fastest one in the world at the time. In the process, he earned a head-to-head victory over Olympic silver medalist Nigel Amos and defending World Champion Mohammed Aman.

=== 2015 World Championships ===
At the 2015 World Championships in Athletics, Tuka's finishing speed against conventional 800-meter runners caused world record holder David Rudisha to try a rarely used strategy of slowing the pace until the final 200 metres of the race. Tuka was perfectly positioned for his normal finish but Rudisha's exceptionally fast finish and strategic positioning by his Kenyan teammate Ferguson Rotich took Tuka out of his game. Tuka finished in bronze medal position, earning Bosnia its first medal in a major athletics championship.

=== 2016 Summer Olympics ===
Tuka competed at the 2016 Summer Olympics, where he finished 12th overall in the 800-meter race By reaching the semi-finals in Rio, Tuka became the first runner from Bosnia and Herzegovina to advance from the Heats stage at the Olympics. Amel Tuka was also the Bosnian flag bearer for his country at the opening ceremony of the games.

=== 2019 World Championships ===
At the 2019 World Athletics Championships, Tuka earned his second medal at a World Athletics Championships, finishing in silver medal position with a season best time of 1:43.47 behind Donavan Brazier.

=== 2020 Summer Olympics ===
Tuka competed at the 2020 Summer Olympics and became the first athlete from Bosnia and Herzegovina to advance to a track and field final at the Olympics, where he placed 6th in the 800-meter final.

== Running style ==
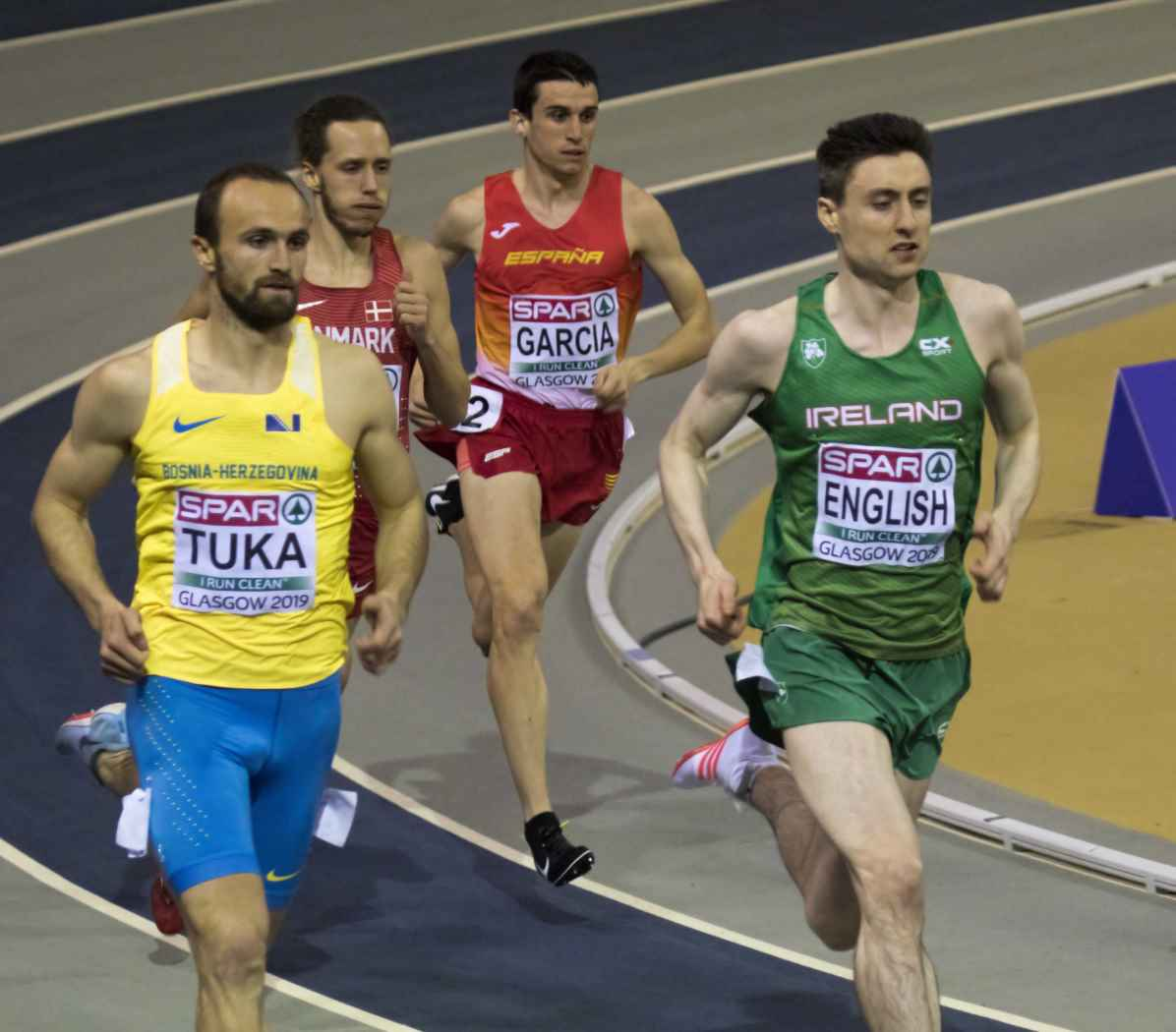
Tuka (left) competing in the 800m at the 2019 European Athletics Indoor Championships

Tuka is known for finishing strongly over the 800 metres, running the early part of the race conservatively before moving up over the final 200 metres.

Amel Tuka has said when he was younger he idolized the running style of track athlete Jeremy Wariner, who influenced him to run the 400 m (instead of the more popular 100 m), before subsequently switching to the 800 m.

== Competition record ==
Year	Competition	Venue	Position	Event	Notes
Representing Bosnia and Herzegovina
2010	European Team Championships – 3rd League	Marsa, Malta	1st	800 m	1:51.43
2010	European Team Championships – 3rd League	Marsa, Malta	9th	4 × 400 m	3:21.49
2011	European Team Championships – 3rd League	Reykjavík, Iceland	9th	400 m	49.91
2011	European Team Championships – 3rd League	Reykjavík, Iceland	3rd	4 × 400 m	3:17.16
2012	European Championships	Helsinki, Finland	24th (sf)	800 m	1:51.14
2013	European Team Championships – 3rd League	Banská Bystrica, Slovakia	3rd	400 m	47.73
2013	European Team Championships – 3rd League	Banská Bystrica, Slovakia	1st	800 m	1:51.11
2013	European U23 Championships	Tampere, Finland	3rd	800 m	1:46.29
2014	European Championships	Zurich, Switzerland	6th	800 m	1:46.12
2015	European Indoor Championships	Prague, Czech Republic	21st (h)	800 m	1:49.92
2015	European Games – 3rd League (Note: The third league of the 2015 European Team Championships)	Baku, Azerbaijan	1st	800 m	1:50.16
2015	World Championships	Beijing, China	3rd	800 m	1:46:30
2016	European Championships	Amsterdam, Netherlands	4th	800 m	1:45.74
2016	Olympic Games	Rio de Janeiro, Brazil	12th (sf)	800 m	1:45.24
2017	European Indoor Championships	Belgrade, Serbia	12th (h)	800 m	1:49.84^{1}
2017	World Championships	London, United Kingdom	21st (h)	800 m	1:46.54
2018	European Championships	Berlin, Germany	13th (sf)	800 m	1:47.24
2019	European Indoor Championships	Glasgow, United Kingdom	6th	800 m	1:47.91
2019	World Championships	Doha, Qatar	2nd	800 m	1:43.47
2021	European Indoor Championships	Toruń, Poland	5th	800 m	1:47.37
2021	Olympic Games	Tokyo, Japan	6th	800 m	1:45.98
2022	European Championships	Munich, Germany	18th (h)	800 m	1:47.73
2023	European Indoor Championships	Istanbul, Turkey	4th	800 m	1:47.90
2023	World Championships	Budapest, Hungary	51st (h)	800 m	1:49.01
2026	Mediterranean Games	Taranto, Italy	–	800 m	DNF

^{Note: This table only includes major athletics championships and does not include Diamond League or World Athletics Continental Tour/IAAF World Challenge meets.}
^{1} Did not start in the semi-finals

Olympic Games
Preceded by Amel Mekić	Flagbearer for Bosnia and Herzegovina; Rio de Janeiro 2016; Tokyo 2020 (shared with Larisa Cerić)	Succeeded by Larisa Cerić with Mesud Pezer
