= Marco Arop =

Canadian middle-distance runner (born 1998)

Marco Arop OLY
- Marco Arop at a press conference during the Wanda Diamond League Athletissima athletics competition.

Personal information
- Born: September 20, 1998 (age 28) Khartoum, Sudan
- Home town: Edmonton, Alberta
- Height: 193 cm (6 ft 4 in)
- Weight: 78 kg (172 lb)
- Website: www.marco-arop.com

Sport
- Country: Canada
- Sport: Track
- Event: 800 metres
- College team: Mississippi State Bulldogs
- Club: Running Room Athletic Club Alberta
- Coached by: Christopher V. Woods, Ron Thompson

Achievements and titles
- Highest world ranking: 1st (800 m, 2023)
- Personal bests: 800 m: 1:41.20 AR, NR (Paris 2024); 1000 m: 2:13.13 AR, NR (Zagreb 2024)
Medal record
Men's athletics
Representing Canada
Olympic Games
Silver medal – second place	2024 Paris	800 m
World Championships
Gold medal – first place	2023 Budapest	800 m
Bronze medal – third place	2022 Eugene	800 m
Bronze medal – third place	2025 Tokyo	800 m
Pan American Games
Gold medal – first place	2019 Lima	800 m
NACAC Championships
Silver medal – second place	2018 Toronto	800 m
Pan American U20 Championships
Silver medal – second place	2017 Trujillo	800 m

Marco Arop OLY (born September 20, 1998) is a Canadian track and field athlete competing in the middle distance events. Arop is the 2023 world champion in the 800 m, winning gold at the 2023 World Athletics Championship, after winning bronze the previous year at the 2022 World Athletics Championships. He was the first Canadian to win a world championship in the 800 m. Arop was also the 2019 Pan American Games champion in 800 m.

Arop represented Canada at the 2020 Summer Olympics and the 2024 Summer Olympics, running a personal best of 1:41.20 over 800 m to win a silver medal in Paris. This time places him as the 4th fastest 800 m runner in history, behind Emmanuel Wanyonyi, Wilson Kipketer, and world record holder David Rudisha. With this time, Arop is also the Canadian and North, Central American and Caribbean record holder over the two lap distance. He also holds the North American record in the 1000 m, with a time of 2:13.13.

== Early life ==
The Arop family fled Sudan during the civil war of the 1990s when Marco was a toddler. He spent his early years sharing an apartment in Egypt with his parents and three older brothers before they immigrated to Canada. The family lived in Saskatoon, Saskatchewan for two years, before taking up residence in Edmonton, Alberta. Arop's initial athletic focus was basketball. He was offered a scholarship by Concordia University of Edmonton but switched his focus to track upon the recommendation of his high school basketball coach, Michael Wojcicki, who would later admit, "I had no idea that Marco was going to be this good." Marco attended the school now called St. Oscar Romero Catholic High School where he competed in Track & Field.

== Competitive career ==
Arop competed for Mississippi State in the 2018 NCAA Division I Outdoor Track and Field 800 m in Eugene, Oregon, finishing in second place. He won the gold medal in the 800 m at the 2019 Pan American Games, setting a new Pan American record in the process. He then made his World Championship debut at the 2019 edition in Doha. Qualifying to the final of the 800 m, he finished seventh. After the World Championships, Arop decided to end his amateur career and turn professional full-time, though the onset of the COVID-19 pandemic meant that the 2020 athletic season was largely cancelled.

In 2021, Arop competed in his first full professional season, making his first Diamond League podium with a silver medal at the BAUHAUS-galan in Stockholm. Named to his first Olympic team, Arop competed in the 800 m event at the 2020 Summer Olympics in Tokyo. Entering the race as a podium contender, he finished seventh in his semi-final. He did not advance to the event final, a major disappointment that he and his coaches attributed to a longstanding habit of starting too quickly, resulting in fading toward the end of the race. In his next event that season, the Prefontaine Classic on the 2021 Diamond League circuit, Arop claimed the gold medal ahead of the reigning Olympic gold and silver medallists, Emmanuel Korir and Ferguson Rotich. Five days later, at the Athletissima in Lausanne, Arop again defeated Korir and Rotich to claim his second Diamond League gold. Arop's results qualified him to the Diamond League Final in Zürich, where he finished in fourth place.

Arop began 2022 with this debut at the World Athletics Indoor Championships at the 2022 edition in Belgrade. He once again started a race hard and was leading the 800 m at the halfway point, but faded badly down the stretch and finished in eighth place. On the 2022 Diamond League, Arop won his third Diamond League gold, and first of the season, at the British Grand Prix in Birmingham. The following month, he won another Canadian national title, besting silver medallist Brandon McBride by almost a full second. In an invitational event held at Foote Field weeks before the 2022 World Athletics Championships, he ran the 800 m in 1:43.61, the third-best time for any athlete that year to date. Arop had the fastest time in the heats of the 800 m in Eugene, Oregon, advancing to the semi-finals. He was second in his semi-final, passed just at the line by Algerian Slimane Moula, and secured automatic qualification to the final. Looking ahead, Arop said, "it's been a great first two rounds, but if I can't get it done in the final, I won't feel like I completed anything." Racing a 1:44.28 time in the final, Arop won the bronze medal, only the second medal for a Canadian in the 800 m at the World Championships. Arop said this medal "means the world" and was "already looking forward to bigger and better next year." Appearing in the 1000 m event at the Herculis meet in Monaco, he set a new national record time of 2:14.35, breaking a decade-old best of Nathan Brannen's.

Going into the 2023 World Athletics Championships, Arop topped the World Athletics rankings for 800 m runners. He proceeded through the heats by finishing in first place and also won his semifinal heat, leading both from start to finish. In the final, Arop changed strategies and dropped to the back of the pack over the first lap, after 500 m, he moved toward the lead of the pack and did not relinquish first place. Arop was the first Canadian male to win the 800 m at the World Athletics Championships. After the race he said that "my best race plan is to be ready for anything and sometimes that's not having a race plan. When the [start] gun [sounded] my body was telling me to be patient. I've visualized this so many times and seen myself winning, but it doesn't compare to the real thing. I'm still in disbelief and I gotta give a lot of credit to my coach, my support team, my family and everybody behind me." Shortly after his World Championship victory, Arop set a new personal best time of 1:43.24 at the 2023 Xiamen Diamond League event, where he finished narrowly second to Kenyan Emmanuel Wanyonyi. In the season-ending 2023 Diamond League Prefontaine Classic he finished second to Wanyonyi again, while setting a new Canadian national record and personal best time of 1:42.85.

Arop began his 2024 season on 4 February, competing in the short track 1000 m run at the New Balance Indoor Grand Prix in Boston, Massachusetts. Arop won the event in a time of 2:14.74, breaking Nate Brannen's previous national record in the short track 1000 m of 2:16.87 set back in 2014. Arop missed Ayanleh Souleiman's short track 1000 m world record of 2:14.20 by only 0.54 seconds, but still set a new North, Central American and Caribbean area record in the event. Prior to the 2024 Olympic Games, on 12 July, Arop competed in the 800 m at the Herculis Meeting in Monaco, finishing sixth in a time of 1:42.93 while Algerian Djamel Sedjati set a new world lead with a time of 1:41.46. However, after making it through the heats and semifinals, in the final of the 800 metres at the Games on 10 August, Arop secured a silver medal, finishing second to Kenyan athlete Emmanuel Wanyonyi, in a new Canadian national record and new North, Central American & Caribbean area record of 1:41.20 to become the fourth fastest man in history at the distance. Arop finished only one hundredth of a second behind Wanyonyi, who ran 1:41.19. He finished ahead of Sedjati, who took third place in a time of 1:41.50. On 8 September, at the Memorial Borisa Hanžekovića in Zagreb, Arop ran a new North American area record in the 1000 m, running 2:13.13 to become the fifth fastest man of all time at this distance.

In October 2024, it was announced that he had signed up for the inaugural season of the Michael Johnson founded Grand Slam Track.

== Competition record ==
=== Championship results ===
Year	Competition	Venue	Position	Event	Notes
Representing Canada
2017	Canada Summer Games	Winnipeg	1st	800 m	1:49:23
2017	Pan American U20 Championships	Trujillo	2nd	800 m	1:47.08
2018	Canadian Championships	Ottawa	1st	800 m	1:46:15
2018	NACAC Championships	Toronto	2nd	800 m	1:46.82
2019	Canadian Championships	Montreal	2nd	800 m	1:46:93
2019	Pan American Games	Lima	1st	800 m	1:44.25
2019	World Championships	Doha	7th	800 m	1:45.78
2021	Olympic Games	Tokyo	14th (sf)	800 m	1:44.90
2022	World Indoor Championships	Belgrade	8th	800 m	1:47.58
2022	Canadian Championships	Langley	1st	800 m	1:44.39
2022	World Championships	Eugene	3rd	800 m	1:44.28
2023	Canadian Championships	Langley	1st	800 m	1:44.39
2023	World Championships	Budapest	1st	800 m	1:44.24
2024	Olympic Games	Paris	2nd	800 m	1:41.20
2025	World Championships	Tokyo	3rd	800 m	1:41.95
2026	World Ultimate Championship	Budapest	2nd	800 m	1:42.28

=== Circuit performances ===
Grand Slam Track results
Slam	Race group	Event	Pl.	Time	Prize money
2025 Kingston Slam	Short distance	1500 m	6th	3:39.65	US$50,000
2025 Kingston Slam	Short distance	800 m	1st	1:45.13	US$50,000
2025 Miami Slam	Short distance	1500 m	7th	3:35.95	US$50,000
2025 Miami Slam	Short distance	800 m	1st	1:43.69	US$50,000
2025 Philadelphia Slam	Short distance	800 m	1st	1:43.38	US$100,000
2025 Philadelphia Slam	Short distance	1500 m	4th	3:35.38	US$100,000

==== Wins and titles ====
- Diamond League
  - Birmingham: 2022 (800 m)
  - Eugene: 2021 (800 m)
  - Lausanne: 2021 (800 m)
