= 2019 World Athletics Championships – Men's 800 metres =

Men's 800 metres at the 2019 World Championships
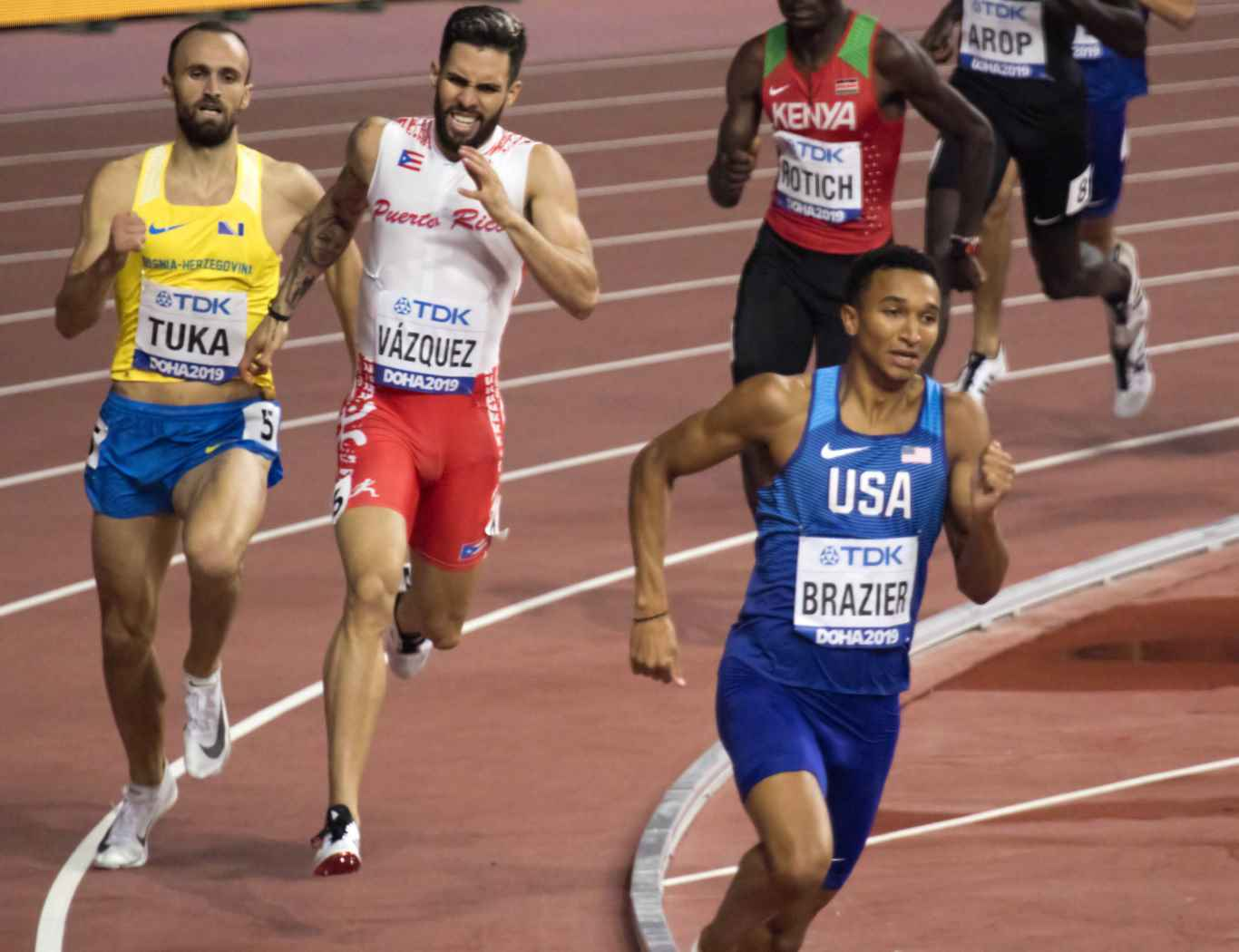
- The last metres.
- Venue: Khalifa International Stadium
- Dates: 28 September (heats); 29 September (semi-finals); 1 October (final)
- Competitors: 45 from 28 nations
- Winning time: 1:42.34 CR

Medalists
gold medal	Donavan Brazier; United States
silver medal	Amel Tuka; Bosnia and Herzegovina
bronze medal	Ferguson Cheruiyot Rotich; Kenya

Video on YouTube Official Video

The men's 800 metres at the 2019 World Athletics Championships was held at the Khalifa International Stadium in Doha from 28 September to 1 October 2019.

The winning margin was 1.13 seconds which as of 2024 remains the only time the men's 800 metres has been won by more than a second at these championships.

== Summary ==
After the semi-finals, it was no surprise when front runner Wesley Vázquez went to the front of the final. Donavan Brazier and Marco Arop took the front of the line to follow his fast pace, going 23.51 for the first 200 metres. Down the first home stretch the rest of the field back off the fast pace, but Brazier stuck right behind Vázquez through a 48.96 first lap. The real surprise was noted kicker Amel Tuka was at the front of the chase pack, separating through the penultimate turn in chase of the leaders. When they hit the backstretch, Brazier went around Vázquez, who was showing the signs of the strain. By 600 metres in 1:15.16, Brazier had two metres on Vázquez, who had two metres on Tuka. Through the final turn, Brazier held the same gap on Tuka, but Vázquez faded. Ferguson Rotich was the next contender, three metres back, the rest of the chasers another six metres behind him. Down the stretch, Brazier was straining, pumping his arms, but Tuka's famed kick was not making up any ground. 40 metres out, Rotich passed Vázquez, but from far off the pace, Bryce Hoppel was gaining fast. Brazier crossed the line and raised his arms in celebration. Tuka held off Rotich who beat the fast moving Hoppel.

Brazier's winning time of 1:42.34 was the championship record, North American Continental record and moved him to =#9 on the all-time list.

== Records ==
Before the competition records were as follows:

World record	David Rudisha (KEN)	1:40.91	London, Great Britain	9 August 2012
Championship record	Billy Konchellah (KEN)	1:43.06	Rome, Italy	1 September 1987
World Leading	Nijel Amos (BOT)	1:41.89	Monaco	12 July 2019
African Record	David Rudisha (KEN)	1:40.91	London, Great Britain	9 August 2012
Asian Record	Yusuf Saad Kamel (BHR)	1:42.79	Monaco	29 July 2008
North, Central American and Caribbean record	Johnny Gray (USA)	1:42.60	Koblenz, West Germany	28 August 1985
South American Record	Joaquim Cruz (BRA)	1:41.77	Cologne, West Germany	26 August 1984
European Record	Wilson Kipketer (DEN)	1:41.11	Cologne, Germany	24 August 1997
Oceanian record	Joseph Deng (AUS)	1:44.21	Monaco	20 July 2018

The following records were set at the competition:

Record	Perf.	Athlete	Nat.	Date
Championship	1:42.34	Donavan Brazier	USA	1 Oct 2019
North, Central American and Caribbean	1:42.34	Donavan Brazier	USA	1 Oct 2019
United States	1:42.34	Donavan Brazier	USA	1 Oct 2019

== Qualification standard ==
The standard to qualify automatically for entry was 1:45.80.

== Schedule ==
The event schedule, in local time (UTC+3), was as follows:

Date	Time	Round
28 September	17:15	Heats
29 September	21:55	Semi-finals
1 October	22:10	Final

== Results ==
=== Heats ===
The first 3 in each heat ( Q ) and the next six fastest ( q ) qualified for the semifinals. The overall results were as follows:

Rank	Heat	Name	Nationality	Time	Notes
1	5	Emmanuel Korir	Kenya	1:45.16	Q
2	5	Mostafa Smaili	Morocco	1:45.27	Q
3	5	Wesley Vázquez	Puerto Rico	1:45.47	Q
4	6	Elliot Giles	Great Britain & N.I.	1:45.53	Q
5	6	Clayton Murphy	United States	1:45.62	Q
6	6	Amel Tuka	Bosnia and Herzegovina	1:45.62	Q
7	6	Álvaro de Arriba	Spain	1:45.67	q
7	5	Yassine Hethat	Algeria	1:45.67	q
9	3	Brandon McBride	Canada	1:45.96	Q
10	4	Ferguson Cheruiyot Rotich	Kenya	1:45.98	Q
11	4	Bryce Hoppel	United States	1:46.01	Q
12	1	Donavan Brazier	United States	1:46.04	Q
13	2	Ngeno Kipngetich	Kenya	1:46.07	Q
14	4	Abdessalem Ayouni	Tunisia	1:46.09	Q
15	3	Abubaker Haydar Abdalla	Qatar	1:46.11	Q
16	1	Marco Arop	Canada	1:46.12	Q
17	2	Adrián Ben	Spain	1:46.12	Q
18	3	Pierre-Ambroise Bosse	France	1:46.14	Q
18	5	Kyle Langford	Great Britain & N.I.	1:46.14	q
20	4	Oussama Nabil	Morocco	1:46.17	q
21	4	Adam Kszczot	Poland	1:46.20	q
22	2	Jamie Webb	Great Britain & N.I.	1:46.23	Q
23	2	Brannon Kidder	United States	1:46.29	q
24	2	Jamal Hairane	Qatar	1:46.40	
25	4	Mohamed Belbachir	Algeria	1:46.52	
26	1	Tshepo Tshite	South Africa	1:46.54	Q
27	3	Mouad Zahafi	Morocco	1:46.56	
28	1	Andreas Kramer	Sweden	1:46.74	
29	6	Andrés Arroyo	Puerto Rico	1:46.75	
30	1	Lucirio Antonio Garrido	Venezuela	1:46.89	
31	3	Peter Bol	Australia	1:46.92	
32	4	Mark English	Ireland	1:47.25	
33	2	Marc Reuther	Germany	1:47.31	
34	6	Edose Ibadin	Nigeria	1:47.91	
35	6	Musa Hajdari	Kosovo	1:47.98	
36	5	Quamel Prince	Guyana	1:48.41	
37	3	Pol Moya	Andorra	1:48.52	
38	1	Mariano García	Spain	1:49.08	
39	1	Luke Mathews	Australia	1:50.16	
40	5	Mohammed Al-Suleimani	Oman	1:50.91	PB
41	5	Benjamín Enzema	Equatorial Guinea	1:51.69	SB
42	3	Ryan Sánchez	Puerto Rico	1:54.46	
43	1	Zaw Min Min	Myanmar	1:56.85	SB
44	3	Roberto Belo Amaral Soares	Timor-Leste	2:02.43	
	6	Samer Al-Johar	Jordan	DQ	163.5
	2	Nijel Amos	Botswana	DNS	

=== Semi-finals ===
The first two in each heat (Q) and the next two fastest (q) qualified for the final.

Rank	Heat	Name	Nationality	Time	Notes
1	1	Wesley Vázquez	Puerto Rico	1:43.96	Q
2	1	Ferguson Cheruiyot Rotich	Kenya	1:44.20	Q
3	1	Clayton Murphy	United States	1:44.48	q
4	2	Donavan Brazier	United States	1:44.87	Q
5	1	Adrián Ben	Spain	1:44.97	q, PB
6	2	Marco Arop	Canada	1:45.07	Q
7	1	Elliot Giles	Great Britain & N.I.	1:45.15	
8	2	Emmanuel Korir	Kenya	1:45.19	
9	1	Adam Kszczot	Poland	1:45.22	
10	2	Brannon Kidder	United States	1:45.62	
11	3	Amel Tuka	Bosnia and Herzegovina	1:45.63	Q
12	2	Mostafa Smaili	Morocco	1:45.78	
13	1	Abdessalem Ayouni	Tunisia	1:45.80	
14	3	Bryce Hoppel	United States	1:45.95	Q
15	2	Tshepo Tshite	South Africa	1:46.08	
16	3	Álvaro de Arriba	Spain	1:46.09	
17	2	Yassine Hethat	Algeria	1:46.15	
18	3	Brandon McBride	Canada	1:46.21	
19	3	Kyle Langford	Great Britain & N.I.	1:46.41	
20	3	Ngeno Kipngetich	Kenya	1:46.61	
21	1	Abubaker Haydar Abdalla	Qatar	1:46.87	
22	3	Pierre-Ambroise Bosse	France	1:47.60	
23	2	Jamie Webb	Great Britain & N.I.	1:48.44	
	3	Oussama Nabil	Morocco	DQ	163.2(b)

=== Final ===
The final was started on 1 October at 22:14.

Rank	Lane	Name	Nationality	Time	Notes
1st place, gold medalist(s)	4	Donavan Brazier	United States	1:42.34	CR AR
2nd place, silver medalist(s)	5	Amel Tuka	Bosnia and Herzegovina	1:43.47	SB
3rd place, bronze medalist(s)	7	Ferguson Cheruiyot Rotich	Kenya	1:43.82	
4	2	Bryce Hoppel	United States	1:44.25	PB
5	6	Wesley Vázquez	Puerto Rico	1:44.48	
6	3	Adrián Ben	Spain	1:45.58	
7	8	Marco Arop	Canada	1:45.78	
8	9	Clayton Murphy	United States	1:47.84	
