= Djamel Sedjati =

Algerian track and field athlete

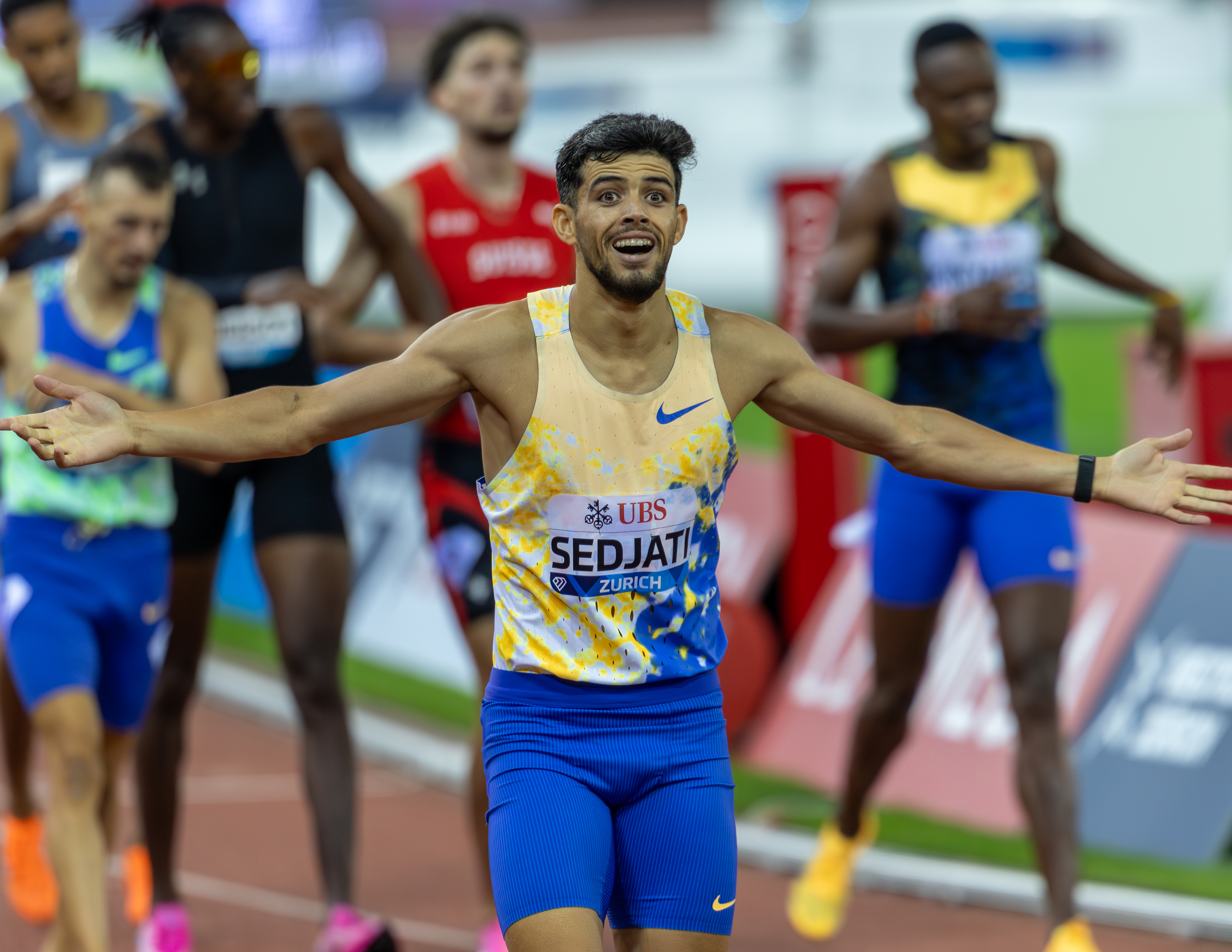
- Djamel Sedjati in the 800 meters at the 2026 Wanda Diamond League’s Weltklasse Zürich athletics competition.

Personal information
- Native name: جمال سجاتي
- Nationality: Algerian
- Born: 3 May 1999 (age 27) Tiaret, Algeria
- Height: 1.77 m (5 ft 10 in)

Sport
- Country: Algeria
- Sport: Athletics
- Events: 600 meters 800 meters 1000 meters
- Club: Club Atletismo Intec-Zoiti
- Coached by: Amar Benida

Achievements and titles
- Personal bests: 600 m: 1:14.36 NR (Sasolburg 2023); 800 m: 1:41.46 NR (Monaco 2024); 1000 m: 2:13.97 (Potchefstroom 2024)
Medal record
Men's athletics
Representing Algeria
Olympic Games
Bronze medal – third place	2024 Paris	800 m
World Championships
Silver medal – second place	2022 Eugene	800 m
Silver medal – second place	2025 Tokyo	800 m
World Ultimate Championship
First place	2026 Budapest	800 m
Diamond League
Second place	2024	800 m
Second place	2026	800 m
Third place	2023	800 m
Mediterranean Games
Gold medal – first place	Oran 2022	800 m
Gold medal – first place	Taranto 2026	800 m

Djamel Sedjati (also written Sejati, Arabic: جمال سجاتي, born 3 May 1999, in Tiaret) is an Algerian middle-distance runner specializing in the 800 meters. He is the fifth fastest man in history at the distance, behind Marco Arop, Emmanuel Wanyonyi, Wilson Kipketer and world record holder David Rudisha. Sedjati won the bronze medal at the 2024 Summer Olympics in the 800 metres event.

== Career ==
=== 2021: Early career ===
Previously unknown in Algeria, Sedjati came to prominence after achieving notable performances in several Algerian national meetings. On 26 March, at the Algerian Winter Championships in Algiers, he finished second to Mohamed Ali Gouaned in the 600 meters with a time of 1:17:40. For 800 meters, he also ran 1:45.99 in a Batna meeting on 12 April, defeating Mohamed Ali Gouaned. The following month, Sedjati finished second behind Mohamed Belbachir in an Algiers meeting on 7 May, clocking a new personal best of 1:45.86.

Sedjati later ran in some French meetings, where he qualified for the 2020 Summer Olympics in the 800 meters after running a personal best of 1:44.91 in Strasbourg, France, on 16 June. He also ran as a pacemaker in subsequent meetings, helping compatriot Yassine Hethat qualify for the 2020 Summer Olympics in the same event.

Upon arriving in Tokyo to compete in the Olympic 800 meters, Sedjati and his compatriot Bilal Tabti both tested positive for COVID-19 on 24 July and were put into quarantine, forcing them to miss their Olympic event.

=== 2022–2023 ===
Sedjati running the 800 m final at the 2023 World Athletics Championships.

At the 2022 World Athletics Championships, Sedjati finished second in the 800 m final, clocking 1:44.14 to win the silver medal.

At the 2023 World Athletics Championshops, Sedjati made it into the 800 m final, but was disqualified due to a lane violation.

=== 2024: Paris Olympics, breaking 1:42 ===
Sedjati representing Algeria at the 2024 Summer Olympics.

On 7 July, Sedjati won the 800 m at the Meeting de Paris, running 1:41.56 to become, at the time, the third fastest man at the distance, behind Wilson Kipketer who ran 1:41.11 in 1997, and David Rudisha, the current world record holder, who ran 1:40.91 at the 2012 Summer Olympics. Sedjati set in the process a new Algerian national record, replacing the previous record by Taoufik Makhloufi since the 2016 Summer Olympics by more than a second.

Five days later, at the Herculis Meeting in Monaco, he won the 800 metres in a time of 1:41.46, thereby improving on his personal best from five days prior by a tenth of a second.

Sedjati qualified for the 800 meter final, on 10 August at the 2024 Summer Olympics in Paris, after missing the event in the previous Olympic cycle due to sickness. He reached the final after winning his race in both the heats and semi-final with times of 1:45:84 and 1:45.08, respectively. Sedjati had remained undefeated in the 2024 season until the Olympic final, where he finished third winning a bronze medal with a time of 1:41.50, behind silver medalist Marco Arop, who finished in 1:41.20, and gold medalist Emmanuel Wanyonyi, who finished one hundredth of a second ahead of Arop in a time of 1:41.19. This shifted Sedjati from the third fastest to the fifth fastest man at 800 m.

== Personal bests ==
Outdoor

- 300 metres – 34.51 (Algiers, 27 March 2021)
- 600 metres – 1:14.36 NR (Sasolburg (RSA), 11 March 2023)
- 800 metres – 1:41.46 NR (Monaco, 12 July 2024)
- 1000 metres - 2:13.97 (Potchefstroom, South Africa, 5 March 2024)

Indoor

- 800 metres – 1:46.28 (Sabadell (ESP), 8 February 2022)
