= Edose Ibadin =

Nigerian-American runner (born 1993)

Personal information
- Nationality: American, Nigerian
- Born: 27 February 1993 (age 33) United States
- Height: 1.79 m (5 ft 10 in)

Sport
- Country: Nigeria
- Sport: Athletics
- Event: 800 metres
- University team: Hampton Pirates
Medal record
Representing Nigeria
Men's athletics
African Games
Gold medal – first place	2023 Accra	4×100 m relay

Edose Ibadin (born 27 February 1993) is a runner who specializes in the 800 metres. Born in the United States, he represents Nigeria internationally.

He finished seventh at the 2018 African Championships. He competed at the 2017 World Championships, the 2019 African Games and the 2019 World Championships without reaching the final.

His personal best time is 1:44.65 minutes, achieved in Washington, D.C. in July 2023. This is the current Nigerian record.

He ran collegiately for the Hampton Pirates and then attended graduate school at Towson University from 2016 to 2018 while training with the District Track Club. Competing in the 2016 US Olympic trials as "unattached", he later changed allegiance to Nigeria.

== Personal bests ==
Outdoor

- 400 metres – 46.67 (Landover 2019)
- 800 metres – 1:44.65 (Washington, D.C. 2023) NR
- 1500 metres – 3:47.57 (Raleigh 2018)

Indoor

- 600 metres – 1:16.35 (New York 2022) NBP
- 800 metres – 1:46.63 (Chicago 2021)
- 1000 metres – 2:21.00 (New York 2019) NR
