= Charlie Hunter (runner) =

Australian middle-distance runner

Personal information
- Full name: Charles Hunter
- Born: 20 July 1996 (age 30)
- Home town: Gosford, Australia
- Education: University of Oregon
- Height: 198 cm (6 ft 6 in)

Sport
- Country: Australia
- Sport: Track and field
- Events: 800m, 1500m, 5000m
- College team: Oregon Ducks
- Club: Union Athletic Club; Nike, Inc
- Turned pro: 2021
- Coached by: Pete Julian; Dec 2021–present

Achievements and titles
- Personal bests: Outdoor; 800 m: 1:44.35 (Vida, OR 2021); 1500 m: 3:34.32 (Oxy, CAL 2022); 3000 metres: 8:07.65 (Sydney 2017); 5000 metres: 13:57.90 (San Juan Capistrano 2020); Indoor; 800 m: 1:45.59 (Fayetteville 2021) NR; Mile: 3:53.49 (Fayetteville 2021) NR; 3000 metres: 7:59.88 (Fayetteville 2019)
Medal record
Men's track and field
Representing (Australia)
Olympic Games
2021 Tokyo	800 m
World Athletics Cross Country Championships
2015 Guiyang	8km

Charlie Hunter (born 20 July 1996) is an Australian middle-distance runner who specializes in the 800 metres.

Hunter competed in the 2020 Tokyo Olympics. He came fourth in his Men's 800m heat with a time of 1:45:91. He qualified for the semi-final where he finished seventh and therefore was eliminated.

== Early years ==
Hunter grew up on the NSW Central Coast. From an early age he enjoyed swimming and surfing rather than running. He played football and rugby at school and then joined Little Athletics as an under-9.

Hunter graduated from high school in 2014 and concentrated on his running. He won the national U20 1500m during his gap year. In 2017, as a 21-year-old, Hunter applied for a scholarship at the University of Oregon in the USA. As he was now a mature student the process took a long time. Finally after 18 months he got the scholarship and made the NCAA 1500m final in his first season (2019).

== Collegiate career ==
In 2021, Hunter placed third overall in the NCAA DI 800m Championships, running for the University of Oregon. At this meet, he set two Australian indoor records in just 24 hours. He broke his own national record for the indoor mile when he ran 3:53.49, then he broke the 800-metre indoor record with a 1:45.59 run, bettering Joseph Deng's time of 1:47.27 set in 2019. On 22 June 2021 Hunter ran the second quickest 800-metre time ever by an Australian and claimed the third place on the Australian 800m team for the delayed 2020 Summer Games when he ran 1:44.35 at a meet in Portland. He came just 0.14 seconds short of Deng's national record time of 1:44.21, set in Monaco in 2018.

Representing Oregon Ducks
School Year	Pac-12 Cross Country Championship	NCAA Cross Country Championship	MPSF Indoor Track Championship	NCAA Indoor Track Championship	Pac-12 Outdoor Track Championship	NCAA Outdoor Track Championship
2020–21 Senior				800m 1st 1:45.90	4 × 400 m 4th 3:09.75	800m 3rd 1:45.75
2020–21 Senior				DMR 1st 9:19.98	800m 2nd 1:46.34	800m 3rd 1:45.75
2019–20 Junior	15th 23:27.0	143rd 32:17.8				
2018–19 Sophomore	16th 23:27.2	182nd 31:24.2	800m 4th 1:49.85	Mile 8th 4:09.36	800m 2nd 1:49.42	1500m 28th 3:43.29
2018–19 Sophomore	16th 23:27.2	182nd 31:24.2	800m 4th 1:49.85	Mile 8th 4:09.36	5000m DNF	1500m 28th 3:43.29

== Professional ==
Hunter represented Australia in the junior race at the IAAF World Cross Country Championships in Guiyang, China, placing 106th in 28:28 over 8 km.

In December 2021, Hunter signed with Nike, Inc. and moved to Portland, Oregon, to train with coach Pete Julian's group (formerly Nike Oregon Project) Union Athletic Club.
