= Mostafa Smaili =

Moroccan middle-distance runner

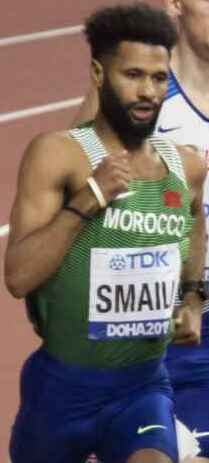
- Mostafa Smaili in 2019

Personal information
- Born: 9 January 1997 (age 29)

Sport
- Sport: Track and field
- Event: 800 metres
Medal record
Men's athletics
Representing Morocco
African Championships
Bronze medal – third place	2018 Asaba	800 m

Mostafa Smaili (born 9 January 1997) is a Moroccan middle-distance runner. At the 2016 IAAF World Indoor Championships and the 2020 Summer Olympics, he competed in the men's 800 metres event.

== Competition record ==
Year	Competition	Venue	Position	Event	Notes
Representing Morocco
2014	African Youth Games	Gaborone, Botswana	3rd	1500 m	3:47.99
2014	Youth Olympic Games	Nanjing, China	4th	1500 m	3:46.28
2016	World Indoor Championships	Portland, United States	6th	800 m	1:52.32
2016	World U20 Championships	Bydgoszcz, Poland	3rd	800 m	1:46.02
2016	Olympic Games	Rio de Janeiro, Brazil	15th (sf)	800 m	1:45.78
2017	Islamic Solidarity Games	Baku, Azerbaijan	1st	800 m	1:45.78
2017	Jeux de la Francophonie	Abidjan, Ivory Coast	2nd	800 m	1:46.73
2017	World Championships	London, United Kingdom	31st (h)	800 m	1:47.50
2018	World Indoor Championships	Birmingham, United Kingdom	6th	800 m	1:48.75
2018	Mediterranean Games	Tarragona, Spain	2nd	800 m	1:47.56
2018	African Championships	Asaba, Nigeria	3rd	800 m	1:45.90
2019	African Games	Rabat, Morocco	5th	800 m	1:45.73
2019	World Championships	Doha, Qatar	12th (sf)	800 m	1:45.78
2021	Olympic Games	Tokyo, Japan	24th (h)	800 m	1:46.05
2022	World Indoor Championships	Belgrade, Serbia	10th (h)	800 m	1:48.57
2022	Mediterranean Games	Oran, Algeria	8th (h)	800 m	1:47.80
2022	Mediterranean Games	Oran, Algeria	6th	4 × 400 m relay	3:07.04
2023	Arab Championships	Marrakesh, Morocco	2nd	800 m	1:46.69
2023	Jeux de la Francophonie	Kinshasa, DR Congo	2nd	800 m	1:47.76

== Personal bests ==
Outdoor

- 400 metres - 47'70 (Fes 2016)
- 800 metres – 1:44.90 (Zagreb 2018)
- 1500 metres – 3:38.60 (Belfort 2017)
- 3000 metres – 8:36.35 (Fès 2013)

Indoor

- 800 metres – 1:45.96 (Gent 2018)
