= 2018 African Championships in Athletics – Men's 800 metres =

The men's 800 metres event at the 2018 African Championships in Athletics was held on 2 and 3 August in Asaba, Nigeria.

== Medalists ==
Gold	Silver	Bronze
Nijel Amos; Botswana	Emmanuel Korir; Kenya	Mostafa Smaili; Morocco

== Results ==
=== Heats ===
Qualification: First 2 of each heat (Q) and the next 2 fastest (q) qualified for the final.

Rank	Heat	Name	Nationality	Time	Notes
1	3	Jonathan Kitilit	Kenya	1:46.55	Q
2	2	Emmanuel Korir	Kenya	1:46.92	Q
3	3	Antoine Gakeme	Burundi	1:46.99	Q
4	3	Edose Ibadin	Nigeria	1:47.28	q
5	2	Nijel Amos	Botswana	1:47.41	Q
6	3	Riadh Chninni	Tunisia	1:47.66	q
7	2	Adisu Girma	Ethiopia	1:47.79	
8	3	Tadese Lemi	Ethiopia	1:47.83	
9	3	Tshepo Tshite	South Africa	1:48.17	
10	1	Ferguson Rotich	Kenya	1:48.19	Q
11	1	Mostafa Smaili	Morocco	1:48.42	Q
12	1	Ahmed Hasan	Ethiopia	1:48.46	
13	1	Rashid Etiau	Uganda	1:48.48	
14	2	Yassine Hethat	Algeria	1:48.59	
15	1	Kabelo Mohlosi	South Africa	1:48.60	
16	1	Mohamed Belbachir	Algeria	1:48.71	
17	3	Geofrey Rutto	Uganda	1:48.78	
18	1	Nyasha Mutsetse	Zimbabwe	1:49.40	
19	3	Semere Medhanie	Eritrea	1:49.66	
20	3	Donald Nyamjua	Cameroon	1:49.91	
21	3	Boitumelo Masilo	Botswana	1:49.97	
22	2	Jerry Motsau	South Africa	1:50.30	
23	1	Kevin Bonbado	Republic of the Congo	1:50.80	
24	2	Benjamin Manuel Enzema	Equatorial Guinea	1:50.91	
25	1	Djibril Ndar Fall	Senegal	1:51.36	
26	2	Santino Kenyi Oreng	South Sudan	1:51.56	
27	3	Moussa Zaroumeye	Niger	1:52.18	
28	2	Hassan Mohammed Hassan Adam	Sudan	1:52.73	
29	2	Prosper Niyonkuru	Burundi	1:52.83	
30	2	Idow Ali	Somalia	1:53.01	
31	1	Yiech Pur Biel	ART	1:53.20	
32	3	Joseph Elia Ernesto	ART	1:55.20	
33	1	Adam Fadlelah Abdelwahab	Sudan	1:55.65	
34	2	James Chiengjiek	ART	1:58.69	
	2	Hamada Mohamed	Egypt	DNS	

=== Final ===
Rank	Athlete	Nationality	Time	Notes
1st place, gold medalist(s)	Nijel Amos	Botswana	1:45.20	
2nd place, silver medalist(s)	Emmanuel Korir	Kenya	1:45.65	
3rd place, bronze medalist(s)	Mostafa Smaili	Morocco	1:45.90	
4	Antoine Gakeme	Burundi	1:45.91	
5	Ferguson Rotich	Kenya	1:46.33	
6	Jonathan Kitilit	Kenya	1:46.88	
7	Edose Ibadin	Nigeria	1:48.31	
8	Riadh Chninni	Tunisia	1:51.46	
