= Oussama Nabil =

Moroccan middle-distance runner

Personal information
- Born: Oussama Nabil; February 18, 1996 (age 30)

Oussama Nabil (born 18 February 1996) is a Moroccan runner who specializes in the 800 metres event.

In the 800 metres, he finished sixth at the 2013 World Youth Championships, won the gold medal at the 2017 Jeux de la Francophonie, the gold medal at the 2017 Arab Championships, finished fourth at the 2017 Islamic Solidarity Games and won the bronze medal at the 2019 African Games.

He also competed at the 2014 World Junior Championships (1500 m) without reaching the final, placed lowly at the 2015 World Cross Country Championships and was disqualified in the semi-final at the 2019 World Championships.

At the 2020 Summer Olympics, he competed in the men's 800 metres event.

His personal best times are 1:45.42 minutes in the 800 metres, achieved at the 2019 African Games in Rabat; and 3:37.08 minutes in the 1500 metres, achieved in July 2017 in Bruay-la-Buissiere.
