= Ferguson Rotich =

Kenyan middle-distance runner

Ferguson Cheruiyot Rotich
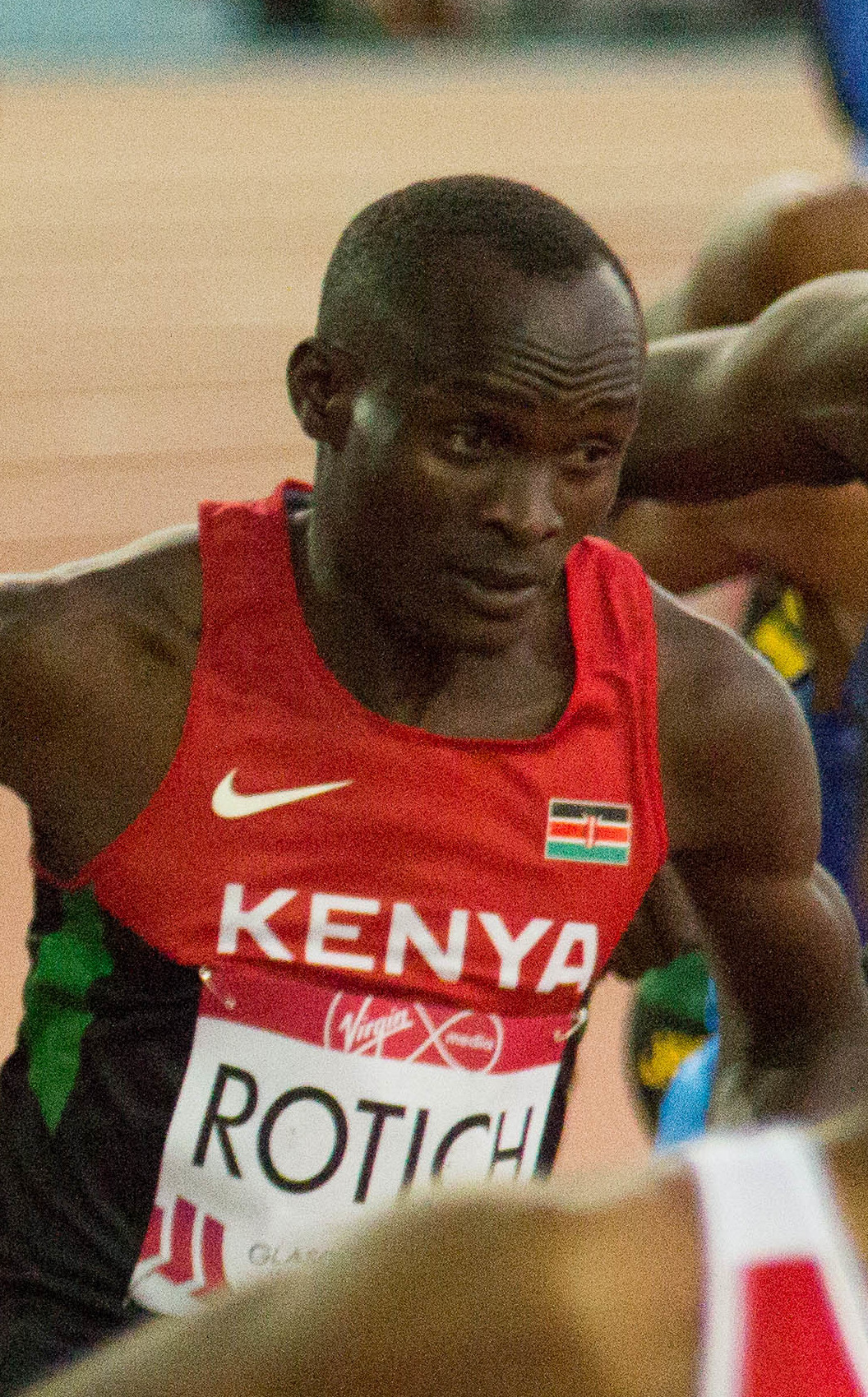
- Rotich in 2014

Personal information
- Nationality: Kenyan
- Born: 30 November 1989 (age 36) Kericho, Kenya
- Height: 1.85 m (6 ft 1 in)
- Weight: 74 kg (163 lb)

Sport
- Country: Kenya
- Sport: Track
- Event: 800 metres
Medal record
Men's athletics
Representing Kenya
Olympic Games
Silver medal – second place	2020 Tokyo	800 m
World Championships
Bronze medal – third place	2019 Doha	800 m
IAAF World Relays
Gold medal – first place	2014 Nassau	4×800 m relay

Ferguson Cheruiyot Rotich (born 30 November 1989) is a Kenyan middle-distance runner who competes in the 800 metres. He has a personal best of 1:42.54 minutes for the event. He represented Kenya at the 2013 World Championships in Athletics and was a gold medallist in the 4×800 metres relay at the 2014 IAAF World Relays. At the 2020 Summer Olympics, he won the silver medal, finishing behind his countryman Emmanuel Korir.

== Career ==
A relative late-comer to the sport, he made his first impact in the 2013 season at the age of 23. He won the 800 m at the Meeting Grand Prix IAAF de Dakar, setting a personal best of 1:45.40 minutes. In his first race in Europe, he went under one minute and 45 seconds for the first time to take fourth at the Golden Spike Ostrava. He placed a narrow second to Anthony Chemut at the Kenyan trials in July, improving further to 1:44.38 minutes. This led to his selection for the 2013 World Championships in Athletics. At the competition, he progressed to the semi-final and initially placed fifth but was disqualified for a lane infringement. He ended the year with two performances on the 2013 IAAF Diamond League circuit, coming third at both the Weltklasse Zürich and the Memorial Van Damme. The latter race was the fastest in the year, and Rotich's time of 1:43.22 minutes ranked him as the third fastest in the world that season, making it a rapid rise for the athlete who was unranked in 2012.

At the first meet of the 2014 IAAF Diamond League in Doha, he came third. He was chosen for the 4×800 metres relay team (alongside Sammy Kibet Kirongo, Job Koech Kinyor and Alfred Kipketer) at the inaugural 2014 IAAF World Relays event and leading off for Kenya he helped the team to the gold medal.

At the 2015 Athletics Kenya World Championship Trials, Rotich shocked world record holder David Rudisha in the 800 metres, beating him by almost half a second to qualify for the 2015 World Championships in Athletics.

== International competition record ==
Year	Competition	Venue	Position	Event	Notes
2013	World Championships	Moscow, Russia	2nd (h)	800 m	1:45.25
2014	IAAF World Relays	Nassau, Bahamas	1st	4 × 800 m relay	7:08.40
2014	Commonwealth Games	Glasgow, United Kingdom	4th	800 m	1:46.09
2014	African Championships	Marrakesh, Morocco	4th	800 m	1:49.10
2015	World Championships	Beijing, China	4th	800 m	1:46.35
2016	Olympic Games	Rio de Janeiro, Brazil	5th	800 m	1:43.55
2017	IAAF World Relays	Nassau, Bahamas	2nd	4 × 800 m relay	7:13.70
2017	World Championships	London, United Kingdom	15th (sf)	800 m	1:46.49
2018	African Championships	Asaba, Nigeria	5th	800 m	1:46.33
2019	World Championships	Doha, Qatar	3rd	800 m	1:43.82
2021	Olympic Games	Tokyo, Japan	2nd	800 m	1:45.23
2023	World Championships	Budapest, Hungary	24th (h)	800 m	1:46.53
