= Yassine Hethat =

Algerian middle-distance runner

- Hethat at the 2019 World Athletics Championships

Personal information
- Born: 30 July 1991 (age 35)
- Height: 1.72 m (5 ft 8 in)
- Weight: 62 kg (137 lb)

Sport
- Country: Algeria
- Sport: Track and field
- Events: 800 metres, 1500 metres

Achievements and titles
- Personal bests: 800 m: 1:44.06 (2022); 1000 m: 2:16.59 (2018); 1500 m: 3:35.68 (2014)
Medal record
Men's athletics
Representing Algeria

Yassine Hethat (born 30 July 1991) is an Algerian middle-distance runner. He competed in the 1500 metres at the 2015 World Championships in Beijing.

He qualified to the 2016 Summer Olympics in Rio de Janeiro. He reached the semi-finals in the 800m with a personal best of 1:44.81 without being able to make it to the final alongside another Algerian, Taoufik Makhloufi.

In 2021, he qualified again for the 2020 Summer Olympics after running a new personal best of 1:44.25 in Castellón (Spain) on 29 June 2021.

== International competitions ==
Year	Competition	Venue	Position	Event	Notes
Representing Algeria
2013	Mediterranean Games	Mersin, Turkey	4th	800 m	1:46.26
2013	Mediterranean Games	Mersin, Turkey	4th	4 × 400 m relay	3:08.27
2013	Islamic Solidarity Games	Palembang, Indonesia	6th	800 m	1:49.55
2015	World Championships	Beijing, China	20th (h)	1500 m	3:40.16
2015	African Games	Brazzaville, Republic of the Congo	9th (h)	800 m	1:50.27
2016	Olympic Games	Rio de Janeiro, Brazil	10th (sf)	800 m	1:44.81
2018	Mediterranean Games	Tarragona, Spain	4th	800 m	1:48.21
2018	African Championships	Asaba, Nigeria	14th (h)	800 m	1:48.59
2019	World Championships	Doha, Qatar	17th (sf)	800 m	1:46.15
2021	Olympic Games	Tokyo, Japan	28th (h)	800 m	1:46.20
2022	Mediterranean Games	Oran, Algeria	2nd	800 m	1:44.79
2022	World Championships	Eugene, United States	16th (h)	800 m	1:46.05

== Personal bests ==
Outdoor

- 800 metres –1:44.06 (Strasbourg 2022)
- 1000 metres – 2:16.59 (Székesfehérvár 2018)
- 1500 metres – 3:35.68 (Oordegem-Lede 2014)

Indoor

- 800 metres – 1:46.83 (Algiers, 1 February 2022)
