= Wesley Vázquez =

Puerto Rican athlete

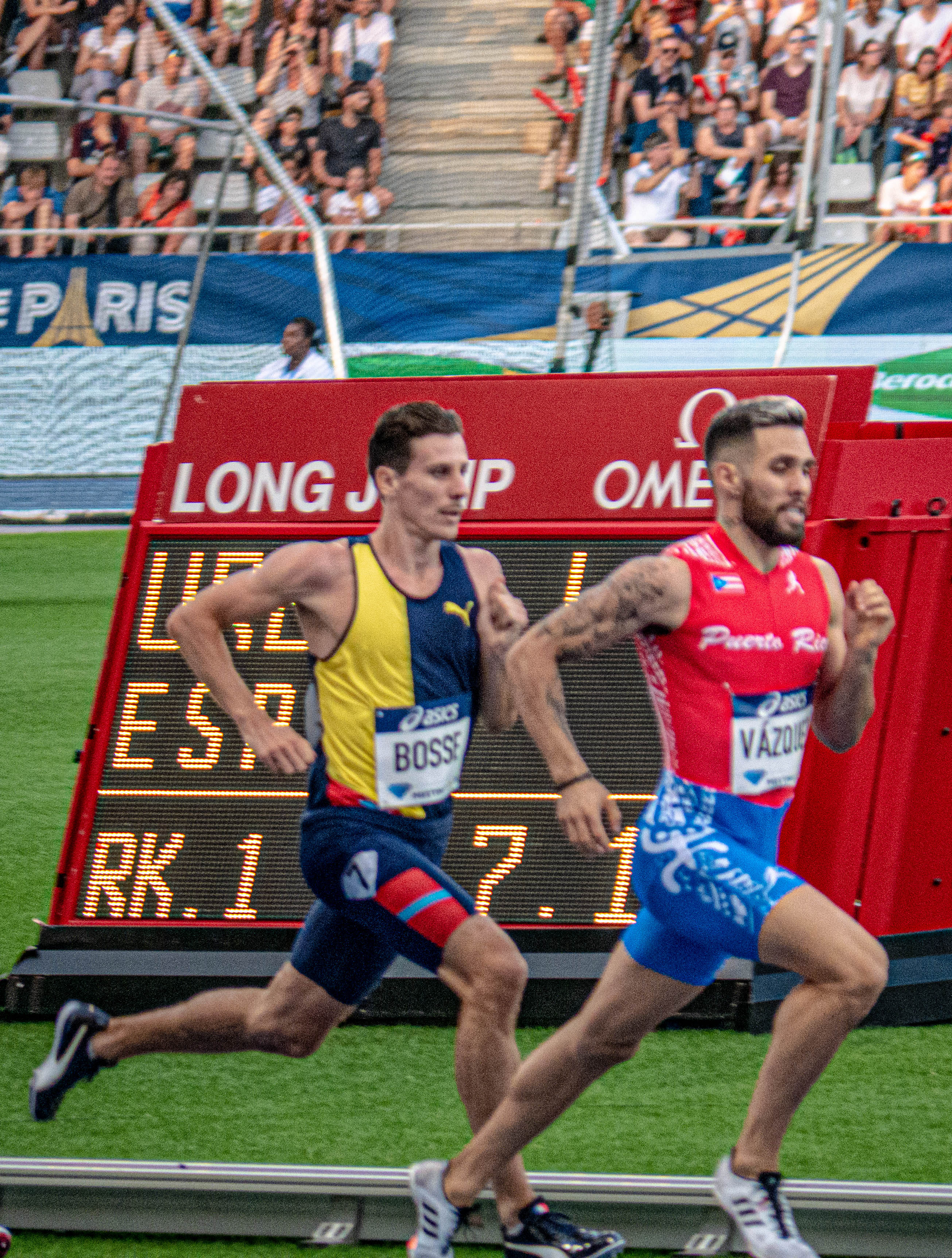
- Vázquez (right) at the 2019 Meeting de Paris

Personal information
- Full name: Wesley Joel Vázquez Vázquez
- Born: 27 March 1994 (age 32) Bayamón, Puerto Rico
- Height: 190 cm (6 ft 3 in)
- Weight: 81 kg (179 lb)

Sport
- Sport: Running
- Event: Middle distances

Achievements and titles
- Personal best(s): 600 m: 1:14.85 (Caguas 2020); 800 m: 1:43.83 (Paris 2019); 1500 m: 3:46.98 (Mayagüez 2016)
Medal record
Men's athletics
Representing Puerto Rico
Pan American Games
Silver medal – second place	2019 Lima	800 m
CAC Junior Championships (Junior)
Gold medal – first place	2012 San Salvador	800 m
Gold medal – first place	2012 San Salvador	1500 m
- Updated on 30 September 2020

Wesley Joel Vázquez Vázquez (born 27 March 1994) is a Puerto Rican middle distance runner.

== Career ==
He reached the finals in the 800 metres at the 2012 World Junior Championships in Athletics in Barcelona.

On 7 July 2014, Vázquez won the Meeting International de Montreuil with a time of 1:45.65.

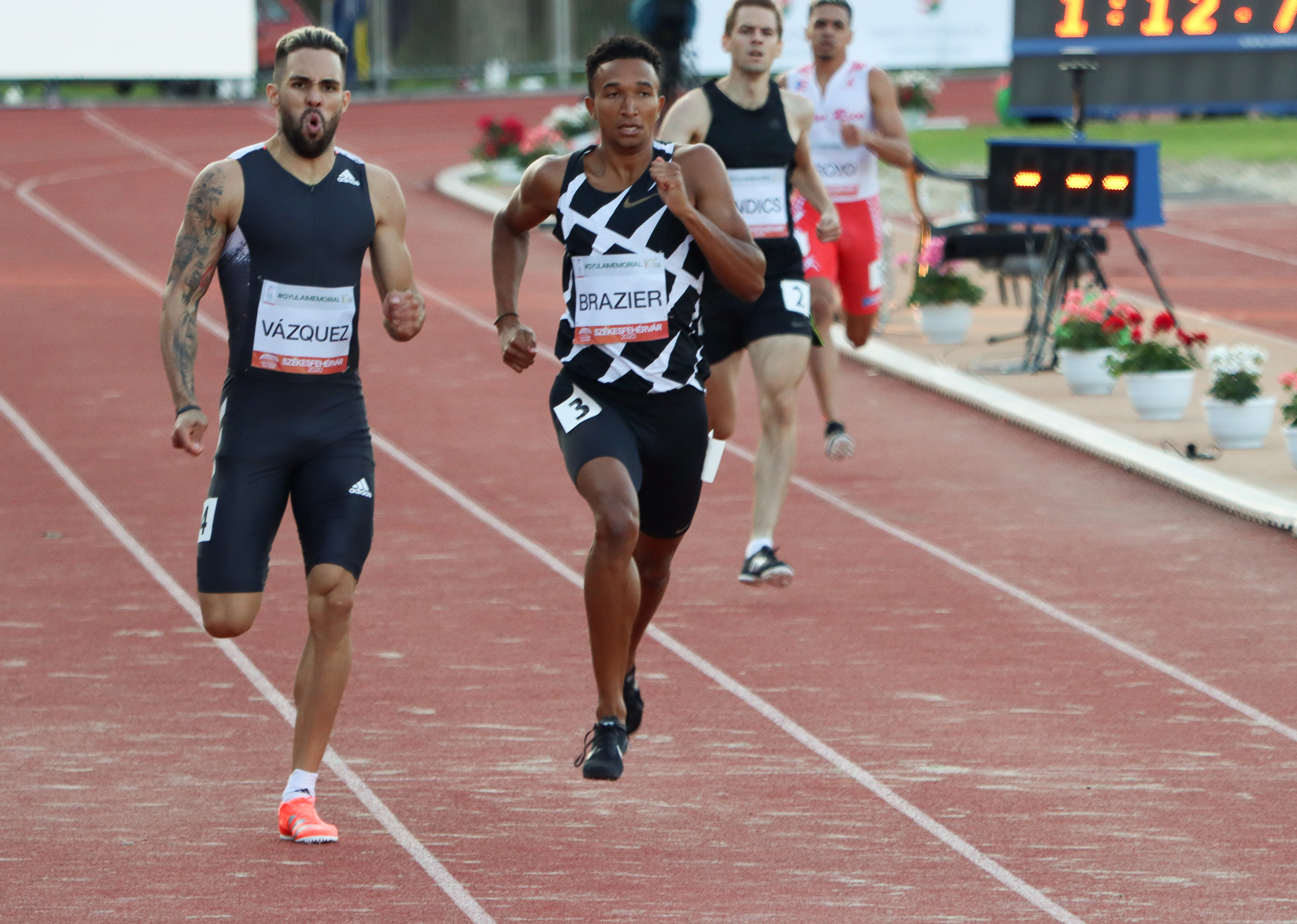
Wesley Vasquez and Donavan Brazier in the 600 metres race at the 2020 Gyulai Memorial in Szekesfehervar, Hungary

== Personal bests ==
=== Outdoor ===
- 400 m: 46.72 sec – Šamorín, Slovakia, 11 September 2020
- 600 m: 1:14.85 min - Caguas, Puerto Rico, 1 August 2020
- 800 m: 1:43.83 min – Paris, France, 24 August 2019
- 1500 m: 3:46.98 min – Mayagüez, Puerto Rico, 16 April 2016

== Achievements ==
Year	Competition	Venue	Position	Event	Notes
Representing Puerto Rico
2010	Central American and Caribbean Junior Championships (U17)	Santo Domingo, Dominican Republic	2nd	800 m	1:55.00
2010	Central American and Caribbean Junior Championships (U17)	Santo Domingo, Dominican Republic	1st	1500 m	4:05.70
2011	World Youth Championships	Villeneuve d'Ascq, France	7th	800 m	1:51.25
2011	Pan American Junior Championships	Miramar, United States	2nd	800 m	1:49.83
2012	Central American and Caribbean Junior Championships (U20)	San Salvador, El Salvador	1st	800 m	1:46.89
2012	Central American and Caribbean Junior Championships (U20)	San Salvador, El Salvador	1st	1500 m	3:53.91
2012	World Junior Championships	Barcelona, Spain	4th	800 m	1:45.29
2012	Olympic Games	London, United Kingdom	4th (h)	800 m	1:46.45
2013	Universiade	Kazan, Russia	4th	800 m	1:47.33
2014	World Relays	Nassau, Bahamas	17th (h)	4 × 400 m relay	3:05.00
2014	Central American and Caribbean Games	Xalapa, Mexico	3rd	800 m	1:46.05 A
2016	Olympic Games	Rio de Janeiro, Brazil	23rd (h)	800 m	1:46.96
2018	Central American and Caribbean Games	Barranquilla, Colombia	3rd	800 m	1:46.6
2018	NACAC Championships	Toronto, Canada	3rd	800 m	1:47.63
2019	Pan American Games	Lima, Peru	2nd	800 m	1:44.48
2019	World Championships	Doha, Qatar	5th	800 m	1:44.48
2021	Olympic Games	Tokyo, Japan	44th (h)	800 m	1:49.06
