= Elliot Giles =

English middle-distance runner

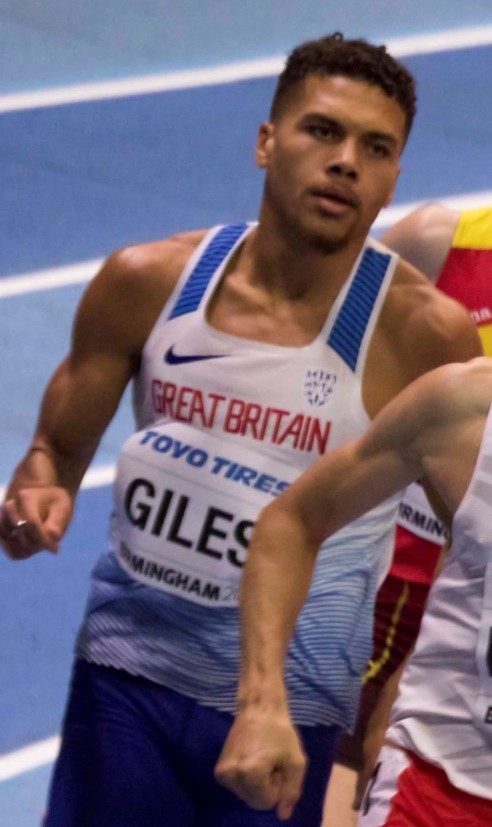
- Giles in 2018

Personal information
- Born: 26 May 1994 (age 32) Birmingham, England
- Education: St Mary's University
- Height: 183 cm (6 ft 0 in)
- Weight: 77 kg (170 lb)

Sport
- Sport: Athletics
- Event: 800 metres
- Club: Birchfield Harriers
- Coached by: Matt Yates (2016); James Brewer (2015-2016); Eddie Cockayne (-2015)
Medal record
Men's athletics
Representing Great Britain
European Championships
Bronze medal – third place	2016 Amsterdam	800 m
Athletics World Cup
Bronze medal – third place	2018 London	800 m

Elliot Levi Giles (born 26 May 1994) is an English middle-distance runner from Birmingham, specialising in the 800 metres. He competed at the 2016 Summer Olympics, 2020 Summer Olympics and the 2024 Summer Olympics and holds the current road mile world record at 3:51.3.

== Biography ==
In August 2014, he had a serious motorcycle accident which prevented him from competing for two years.

His breakthrough year was 2016 when he became British champion over the distance, and was selected for the senior GB team for the first time at the European Athletics Championships where he won a surprise bronze medal. His new personal best of 1:45.54, set in the final, qualified him for the 2016 Summer Olympics. In Rio de Janeiro, however, he only managed seventh place in his heat which was not good enough for a place in the semifinals. In February 2021, he set a new British record for the 800 metres indoors, at the World Indoor Tour event in Torun, Poland. This record had stood since March 1983, when it was set by Seb Coe.

Having initially missed out on selection for the 2024 Summer Olympics, Giles was called up as a late replacement for the injured Jake Wightman. Giles reached the 800m semi-final.

Giles set a new road mile world record of 3:51.3, winning the KO Meile in Düsseldorf over Yared Nuguse, on 1 September 2024, breaking Emmanuel Wanyonyi's previous mark of 3:54.6 by over three seconds.

Giles is a four-times British 800 metres champion after winning the British Athletics Championships in 2016, 2017, 2018 and 2021.

== International competitions ==
Year	Competition	Venue	Position	Event	Notes
Representing Great Britain and England
2016	European Championships	Amsterdam, Netherlands	3rd	800 m	1:45.54
2016	Olympic Games	Rio de Janeiro, Brazil	29th (h)	800 m	1:47.88
2017	World Championships	London, United Kingdom	20th (sf)	800 m	1:46.95
2018	World Indoor Championships	Birmingham, United Kingdom	4th	800 m	1:48.22
2018	Commonwealth Games	Gold Coast, Australia	15th (h)	800 m	1:48.54
2018	World Cup	London, United Kingdom	3rd	800 m	1:47.40
2018	European Championships	Berlin, Germany	15th (sf)	800 m	1:47.40
2019	World Championships	Doha, Qatar	7th (sf)	800 m	1:45.15
2021	Olympic Games	Tokyo, Japan	11th (sf)	800 m	1:44.74
2023	World Championships	Budapest, Hungary	26th (sf)	1500 m	3:39.05
2024	European Championships	Rome, Italy	7th	800 m	1:47.06
2024	Olympic Games	Paris, France	15th (sf)	800 m	1:45.46
2025	World Championships	Tokyo, Japan	31st (h)	1500 m	3:41.60

== Circuit performances ==
Grand Slam Track results
Slam	Race group	Event	Pl.	Time	Prize money
2025 Philadelphia Slam	Short distance	800 m	8th	1:46.73	US$10,000
2025 Philadelphia Slam	Short distance	1500 m	8th	3:39.92	US$10,000

== Personal bests ==
Outdoor

- 800 metres – 1:44.56 (Doha 2020)
- 1500 metres – 3:30.92 (London 2023)
- One mile – 3:49.16 (Oslo 2025)

Indoor

- 800 metres – 1:43.63 NR (Torun 2021)
- 1500 metres – 3:36.90 (Val-de-Reuil 2021)
- One mile – 3:59.71 (London 2019)

Road

- One mile – 3:51.3 WR (Düsseldorf 2024)
