= Emmanuel Korir =

Kenyan middle-distance runner

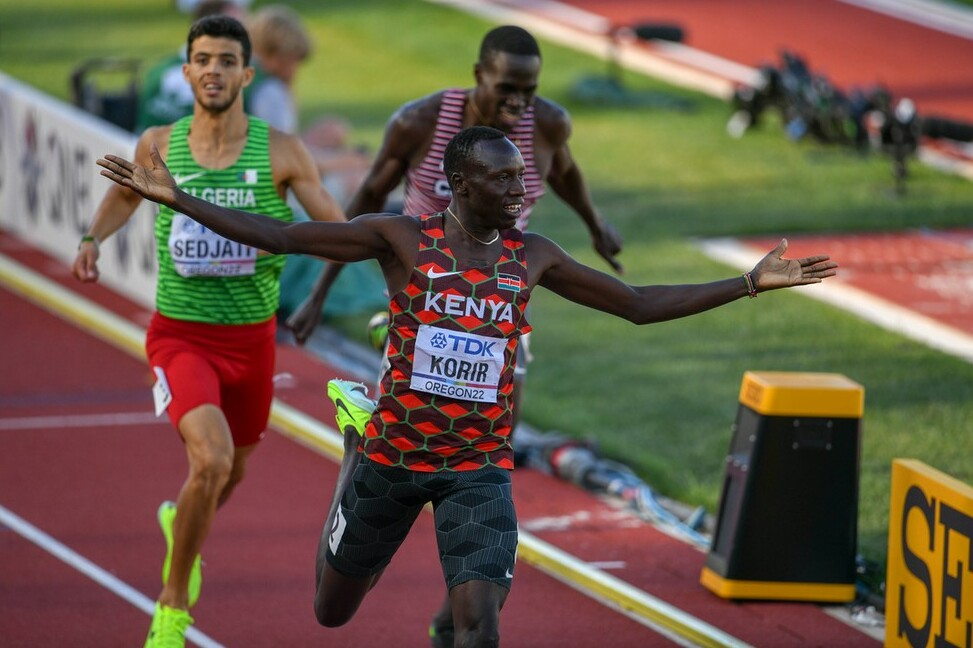
- Korir (center) at the 2022 World Athletics Championships in Eugene

Personal information
- Full name: Emmanuel Kipkurui Korir
- Born: 15 June 1995 (age 31) Iten, Elgeyo-Marakwet County, Kenya

Sport
- Country: Kenya
- Sport: Track and field
- Event: 400 m – 800 metres

Achievements and titles
- National finals: 2016 Kenyan Champs; • 800 m, 1st (gold); 2016 Kenyan Champs; • 800 m, 8th; 2018 Kenyan Champs; • 400 m, 1st (gold); 2018 Kenyan Champs; • 400 m, 1st (gold); 2019 Kenyan Champs; • 400 m, 1st (gold); 2019 Kenyan Champs; • 400 m, 1st (gold)
- Personal bests: 400 m: 44.21A (Nairobi 2018); 800 m: 1:42.05 (London 2018)
Medal record
Men's athletics
Representing Kenya
Olympic Games
Gold medal – first place	2020 Tokyo	800 m
World Championships
Gold medal – first place	2022 Eugene	800 m
Diamond League
First place	2018	800 m
First place	2021	800 m
First place	2022	800 m
African Championships
Gold medal – first place	2018 Asaba	4 × 400 m relay
Silver medal – second place	2018 Asaba	800 m
Representing Africa
Continental Cup
Gold medal – first place	2018 Ostrava	800 m

Emmanuel Kipkurui Korir (born 15 June 1995) is a Kenyan middle-distance runner. He is the 2020 Tokyo Olympic and 2022 World champion in the 800 metres. Korir won the silver medal in the event at the 2018 African Championships in Athletics.

As of December 2024 he was ranked as the twelfth fastest athlete of all time over the 800 m, with a personal best of 1:42.05. Korir is a three-time Diamond League champion at the event.

== Career ==
In 2013, athletics coach Brother Colm O’Connell, who was also based in Iten in Kenya, convinced Emmanuel Korir to switch from shorter sprints to the 400 metres.

After 1:46.94 run in the finals of the 2016 Kenyan Championships, he was offered a scholarship at the University of Texas in El Paso, Texas in the USA. While at UTEP Miners, he was coached by the Olympic 800 m champion Paul Ereng.

In January 2017, Korir set an indoor world record for the 600 metres. The same year, he left the UTEP for a professional running contract with Nike, Inc.

In 2017 and 2019, he failed to make the 800 metres finals at the World Athletics Championships, securing the silver medal in the event at the 2018 African Championships in Athletics.

Korir qualified to represent Kenya at the 2020 Tokyo Olympics, where he won the gold medal in the 800 m event with a time of 1:45.06.

He completed the Olympic-world double at the 2022 World Athletics Championships held in Eugene, Oregon, claiming 800 m title in a season's best of 1:43.71. At the Commonwealth Games in Birmingham the following month, he was disqualified for a lane infringement in the men's 400 metres heats.

His current residence is El Paso, Texas.

== Achievements ==
=== International competitions ===
Representing Kenya
Year	Competition	Venue	Position	Event	Result
2017	World Championships	London, United Kingdom	8th (sf)	800 m	1:46.08
2018	African Championships	Asaba, Nigeria	2nd	800 m	1:45.65
2018	African Championships	Asaba, Nigeria	1st	4 × 400 m relay	3:00.92
2018	Continental Cup	Ostrava, Czech Republic	1st	800 m	1:46.50
2019	World Championships	Doha, Qatar	6th	400 m	44.94
2019	World Championships	Doha, Qatar	8th (sf)	800 m	1:45.19
2021	Olympic Games	Tokyo, Japan	–	400 m	DQ
2021	Olympic Games	Tokyo, Japan	1st	800 m	1:45.06
2022	World Championships	Eugene, OR, United States	1st	800 m	1:43.71
2022	Commonwealth Games	Birmingham, United Kingdom	–	400 m	DQ
2023	World Championships	Budapest, Hungary	29th (h)	800 m	1:46.78

=== Circuit wins and titles ===
- Diamond League champion 800 m (3): 2018, 2021, 2022

800 metres wins, other events specified in parentheses

- 2017 (1): Monaco Herculis (WL PB)
- 2018 (5): Doha Diamond League, Eugene Prefontaine Classic (SB), London Anniversary Games (WL PB MR), Birmingham British Grand Prix (MR), Brussels Memorial Van Damme
- 2021 (1): Zürich Weltklasse
- 2022 (2): Chorzów Kamila Skolimowska Memorial, Zürich (WL)

=== National and NCAA championships ===
- Kenyan Athletics Championships
  - 400 metres: 2018
- NCAA Division I Men's Outdoor Track and Field Championships
  - 800 metres: 2017
- NCAA Division I Men's Indoor Track and Field Championships
  - 800 metres: 2017

=== Personal bests ===
- 400 metres – 44.21 (Nairobi 2018)
- 800 metres – 1:42.05 (London 2018)
  - 800 metres indoor – 1:44.21 (New York, NY 2018)
- 1000 metres – 2:18.19 (Monaco 2022)
