= Donavan Brazier =

American middle-distance runner

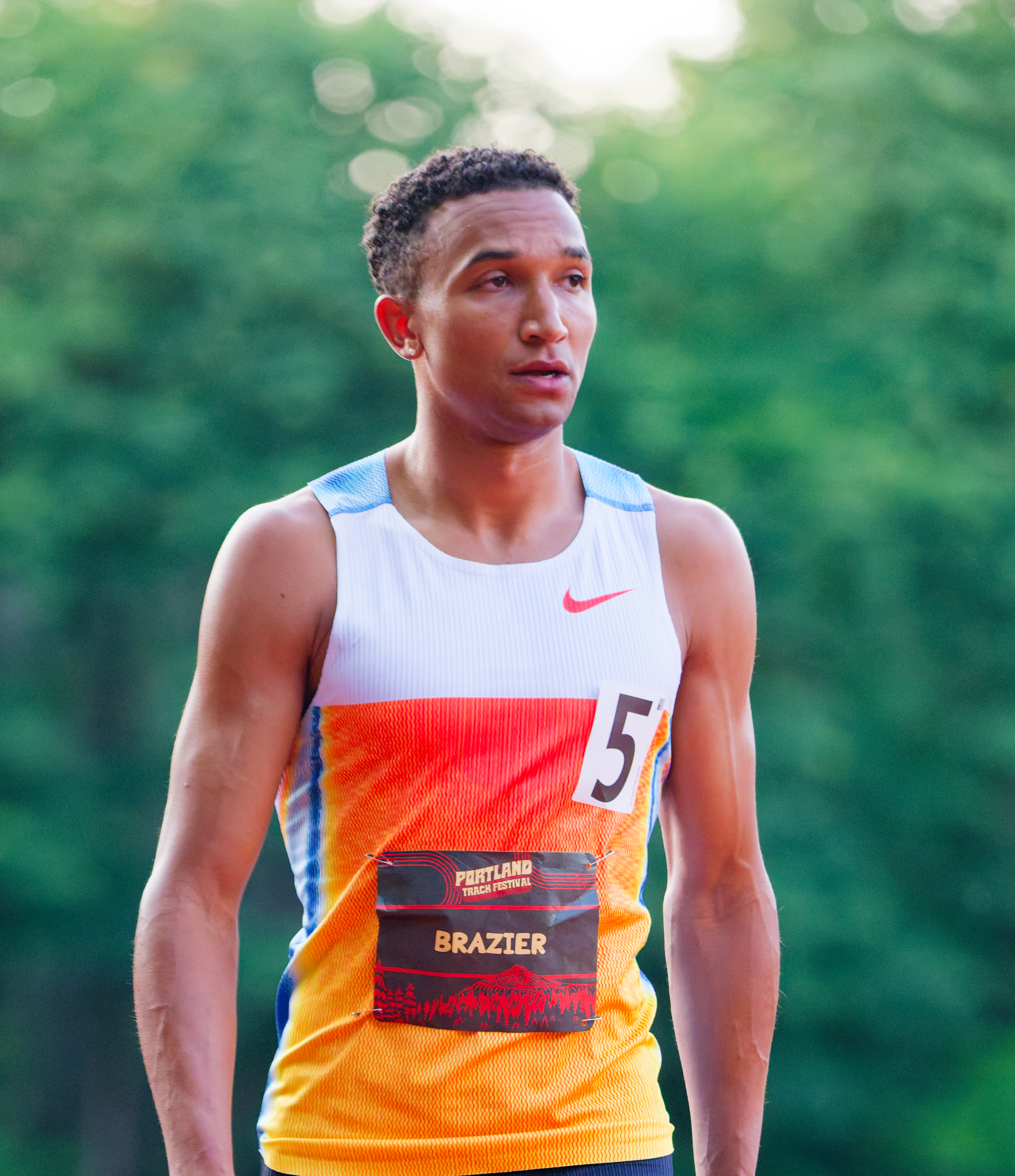
- Brazier in 2025

Personal information
- Born: April 15, 1997 (age 29) Grand Rapids, Michigan, U.S.
- Height: 6 ft 2 in (188 cm)
- Weight: 165 lb (75 kg)

Sport
- Country: United States
- Sport: Track
- Event: 800 meters
- College team: Texas A&M Aggies
- Club: Nike
- Coached by: Mike Smith (–2025)

Achievements and titles
- World finals: 2017 London; 800 m, 13th (sf); 2019 Doha; 800 m, Gold; 2022 Eugene; 800 m, 29th (h)
- Personal bests: Outdoor; 800 m: 1:42.16 (Eugene 2025); 1500 m: 3:35.85 (Portland 2020); Indoor; 400 m: 46.14i (Spokane 2022); 600 m: 1:13.77i (New York 2019); 800 m: 1:44.21i (New York City 2021); Mile: 3:59.30i (College Station 2017)
Medal record
World Championships
| Gold medal – first place | 2019 Doha | 800 m |
World Relays
| Gold medal – first place | 2019 Yokohama | Mixed 2 × 2 × 400 m relay |
Diamond League
| First place | 2019 | 800 m |

Donavan Brazier (born April 15, 1997) is an American middle-distance runner. He holds the American junior record in the men's 800 meters and won the gold medal at the 2019 World Championships. With a time of 1:42.34, he was the American national and NACAC area record holder in the event from 2019 until 2024, when Marco Arop and Bryce Hoppel ran 1:41.20 and 1:41.67 to break the NACAC record and American record respectively.

== Athletics career ==
=== Youth ===
In 2014, his junior year at Kenowa Hills High School, Brazier won the 800 meters at the New Balance national scholastic championships in 1:48.61; his time was a new Michigan state record. His times continued the drop in his senior year; he ran a 45.92 split on a 4 × 400 meters relay and improved his 800-meter best to 1:47.55, placing him fourth on the all-time national high school list. Brazier ran 1:47.55 in June 2015 in the 800 meters at the Brooks PR Invitational. Brazier competed in the 800 meters at 2015 USA Junior Outdoor Track and Field Championships but was disqualified. In summer 2015, Brazier attempted to earn an opportunity to represent United States on his first national team as a junior (U20) at 2015 Pan American Junior Athletics Championships to compete in the 800 m.

=== Collegiate ===
After graduating from high school after the 2015 season Brazier went to Texas A&M University, where he was coached by former top runner Alleyne Francique and head coach Pat Henry. He ran 1:45.92 in his collegiate debut race on January 16, 2016, breaking John Marshall's American junior indoor record by almost two seconds; the time was also a NACAC junior indoor record, and missed the American collegiate record by only 0.05 seconds. (Note: "American collegiate record" refers to the best collegiate indoor mark by an American athlete, Derek Peterson's 1:45.88; Brazier missed Paul Ereng's overall NCAA indoor record (1:44.84) by more than a second.) He won the 2016 SEC indoor championship in 1:46.08, but failed to finish his heat at the NCAA indoor championships due to a back injury.

Brazier returned to action outdoors, but needed several meets to return to top shape. He placed third at the SEC outdoor championships in 1:46.19, half a second behind Mississippi State's Brandon McBride. At the NCAA outdoor championships in Eugene, Brazier won his semi-final in a personal best of 1:45.07. The final was a rematch between Brazier and McBride; McBride led for most of the way, but Brazier passed him with 150 meters to go and won in 1:43.55. The time was a new collegiate record, American junior and NACAC junior record and world junior (U20) leader; the previous American junior outdoor record was Jim Ryun's 1:44.3/1:44.9y, set exactly fifty years earlier on June 10, 1966. Brazier's American and NACAC junior record stood until 2025, when Cooper Lutkenhaus ran 1:42.27.

=== Professional ===
Brazier turned professional after his NCAA victory, signing an endorsement deal with Nike and forgoing his three remaining years of collegiate eligibility. Brazier finished 19th in the 800 meters at the 2016 USATF Olympic Trials in 1:48.13. Donavan Brazier reconnected with his coach from Texas A&M University (Grenada’s top 400 m runner Alleyne Francique). At the 2017 National Championships, he followed Eric Sowinski's early kick into a breakaway position and held his pace as Sowinski faded to win his first national championship, thus qualifying for the World Championships.

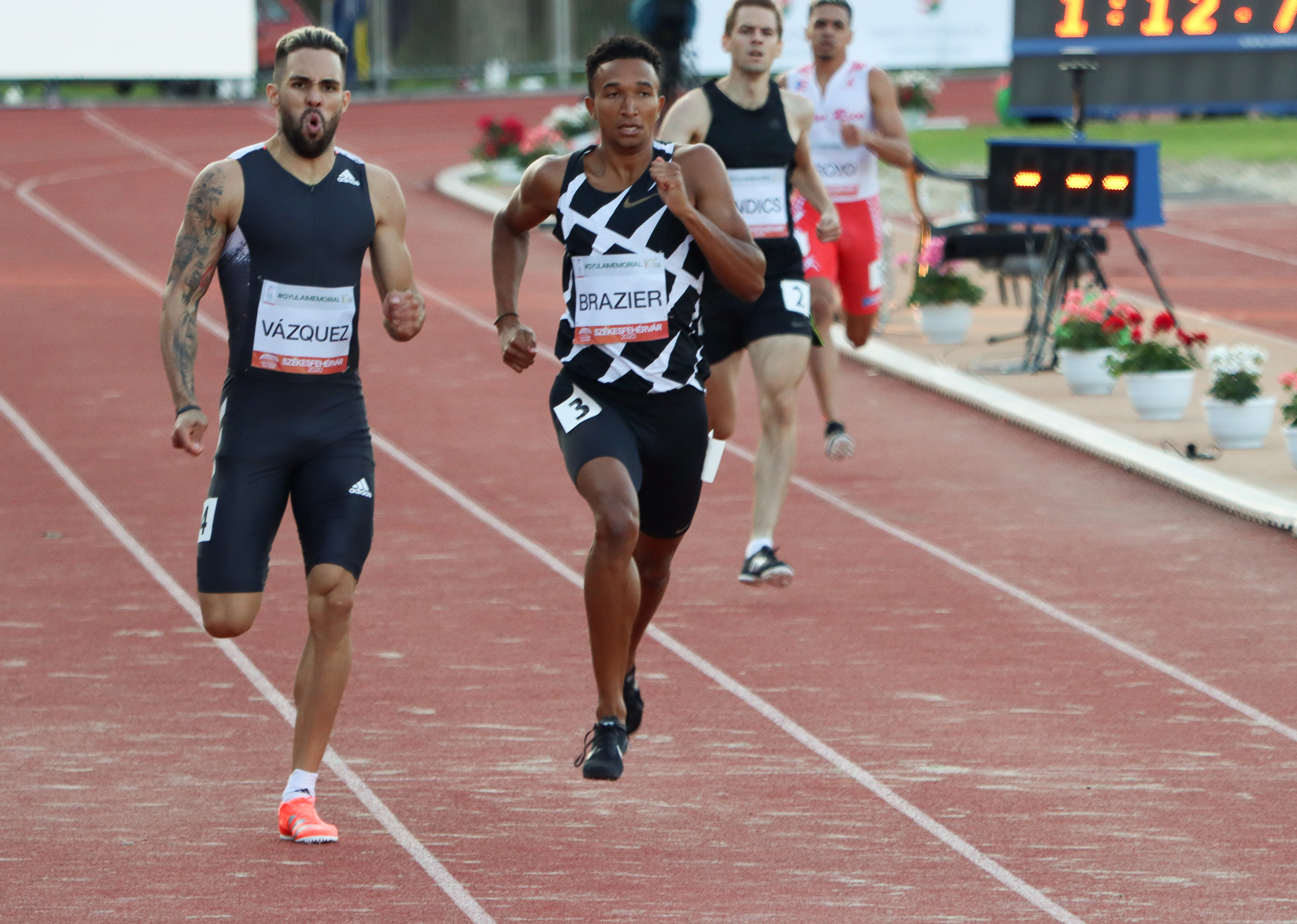
Wesley Vasquez and Donavan Brazier in the 600 meters race at the 2020 Gyulai Memorial in Szekesfehervar, Hungary

On August 29, 2019, Brazier set a new 800 meter personal best of 1:42.70 en route to winning the Diamond League meet in Zurich, Switzerland. In this race, Brazier demonstrated phenomenal finishing speed by overtaking Botswanan runner Nijel Amos in the last 30 meters, who had attempted the race at world record pace.

On October 1, 2019, Brazier won the 800 meter at the World Championships in Doha, Qatar. His time of 1:42.34 was a championships record and a new American record, surpassing Johnny Gray's 1:42.60 from 1985. At the end of the season, Brazier was selected for the Jesse Owens Award.

On February 8, 2020, Brazier set the American indoor 800 meter record in a time of 1:44.22. He opened his 2020 season in the 1500 meters, running a world lead of 3:35.85. In August he ran another world lead in the 800 meters, with 1:43.15.

On February 13, 2021, Brazier ran 1:44.21 in the 800 meters at the New Balance Indoor Grand Prix in New York City to lower his then-American indoor record (since broken by Josh Hoey in 2025) in the event by .01 seconds. The same year, Brazier had surgery to repair a fractured tibia.

At the 2022 World Athletics Championships, Brazier was eliminated in the first round of the 800 meters. He later underwent achilles surgery to repair a Haglund's deformity, which required two follow-up surgeries. At the end of 2023, he left the Nike Union Athletics Club and coach Pete Julian. In 2025, Brazier began to receive workouts from Mike Smith.

On June 7, 2025, at the TOAD Fest in Nashville, Tennessee, Brazier won the 800 meters in 1:44.70. It was his first race since 2022, due to recurring injuries and a coaching change. On June 16, 2025, he won the 800 meters at the Portland Track Festival in a time of 1:43.81. On July 19, 2025, he finished sixth in the 800 meters at the London Athletics Meet, in a season's best time of 1:43.08. On August 3, 2025, Brazier won the 800 meter final at the 2025 USA Outdoor Track and Field Championships, in a new personal best of 1:42.16, thus qualifying for the 2025 World Championships in Tokyo, Japan. At the 2025 World Championships, Brazier was eliminated in the semifinal round.

== Personal life ==
Brazier has been in a relationship with Ally Watt and got engaged on February 24, 2025. The couple married on December 19, 2025.

== Achievements ==
=== Personal bests ===
| | Event | Time | Date | Location | Notes |
|---|---|---|---|---|---|
| Outdoor | 400 m | 47.02 | 9 April 2016 | Tempe, Arizona | |
| Outdoor | 800 m | 1:42.16 | 3 August 2025 | Eugene, Oregon | |
| Outdoor | 1500 m | 3:35.85 | 3 July 2020 | Portland, Oregon | |
| Indoor | 400 m | 46.14 | 27 February 2022 | Spokane, Washington | |
| Indoor | 600 m | 1:13.77 | 24 February 2019 | New York City, New York | WB |
| Indoor | 800 m | 1:44.21 | 13 February 2021 | New York City, New York | |
| Indoor | 1000 m | 2:21.79 | 11 February 2017 | New York City, New York | |
| Indoor | Mile | 3:59.30 | 9 December 2017 | College Station, Texas | |

=== International competitions ===
| Year | Competition | Venue | Position | Event | Time | Ref |
Representing the United States
| 2017 | World Championships | Olympic Stadium, London, England | 13th (sf) | 800 m | 1:46.27 | |
| 2018 | World Indoor Championships | National Indoor Arena, Birmingham, England | DQ | 800 m | DQ | |
| 2019 | World Relays | Yokohama, Japan | 1st | 2 x 2 x 400 m | 3:36.92 | |
| 2019 | World Championships | Khalifa International Stadium, Doha, Qatar | 1st | 800 m | 1:42.34 | |
| 2022 | World Championships | Hayward Field, Eugene, Oregon | 29th (h) | 800 m | 1:46.72 | |
| 2025 | World Championships | Tokyo, Japan | 3rd (s.f) | 800 m | 1:43.82 | |

=== Circuit wins and titles ===
==== Indoor Tour ====
| Year | Competition | Venue | Position | Event | Time | Ref |
|---|---|---|---|---|---|---|
| 2017 | New Balance Indoor Grand Prix | Reggie Lewis Center, Boston, United States | 1st | 600 m | 1:16.57 | |
| 2017 | Millrose Games | The Armory, New York, United States | 4th | 1000 m | 2:21.79 | |
| 2018 | Millrose Games | The Armory, New York, United States | 2nd | 800 m | 1:45.35 | |
| 2018 | New Balance Indoor Grand Prix | Reggie Lewis Center, Boston, United States | 1st | 800 m | 1:45.11 | |
| 2019 | New Balance Indoor Grand Prix | Reggie Lewis Center, Boston, United States | 1st | 800 m | 1:45.91 | |
| 2019 | Millrose Games | The Armory, New York, United States | 2nd | 800 m | 1:44.41 | |
| 2020 | New Balance Indoor Grand Prix | Reggie Lewis Center, Boston, United States | 1st | 600 m | 1:14.39 | |
| 2020 | Millrose Games | The Armory, New York, United States | 1st | 800 m | 1:44.22 | |

==== Diamond League ====
| Year | Competition | Venue | Position | Event | Time | Ref |
|---|---|---|---|---|---|---|
| 2017 | Golden Gala | Stadio Olimpico, Rome, Italy | 3rd | 800 m | 1:46.08 | |
| 2017 | Anniversary Games | Olympic Stadium, London, England | 2nd | 800 m | 1:43.95 | |
| 2017 | Meeting International Mohammed VI d'Athletisme de Rabat | Prince Moulay Abdellah Stadium, Rabat, Morocco | 3rd | 800 m | 1:44.62 | |
| 2019 | Doha Diamond League | Khalifa International Stadium, Doha, Qatar | 3rd | 800 m | 1:44.70 | |
| 2019 | Golden Gala | Stadio Olimpico, Rome, Italy | 1st | 800 m | 1:43.63 | |
| 2019 | Weltklasse Zürich | Letzigrund, Zürich, Switzerland | 1st | 800 m | 1:42.70 | |
| 2020 | Herculis | Stade Louis II, Monaco | 1st | 800 m | 1:43.15 | |
| 2020 | BAUHAUS-galan | Olympic Stadium, Stockholm, Sweden | 1st | 800 m | 1:43.76 | |

=== National championships ===
| Year | Competition | Venue | Position | Event | Time | Ref |
|---|---|---|---|---|---|---|
| 2016 | U.S. Olympic Trials | Hayward Field, Eugene, Oregon | 19th (h) | 800 m | 1:48.13 | |
| 2017 | U.S. Indoor Championships | Albuquerque Convention Center, Albuquerque, New Mexico | 6th | 600 m | 1:16.10 | |
| 2017 | U.S. Outdoor Championships | California State University, Sacramento, California | 1st | 800 m | 1:44.14 | |
| 2018 | U.S. Indoor Championships | Albuquerque Convention Center, Albuquerque, New Mexico | 1st | 800 m | 1:45.10 | |
| 2019 | U.S. Indoor Championships | The Armory, New York, United States | 1st | 600 m | 1:13.77 | |
| 2019 | U.S. Outdoor Championships | Drake Stadium, Des Moines, Iowa | 1st | 800 m | 1:45.62 | |
| 2021 | U.S. Olympic Trials | Hayward Field, Eugene, Oregon | 8th | 800 m | 1:47.88 | |
| 2022 | U.S. Outdoor Championships | Hayward Field, Eugene, Oregon | DNS (sf) | 800 m | DNS | |
| 2025 | U.S. Outdoor Championships | Hayward Field, Eugene, Oregon | 1st | 800 m | 1:42.16 | |

=== NCAA championships ===
| Year | Competition | Venue | Position | Event | Time | Ref |
|---|---|---|---|---|---|---|
| 2016 | NCAA Division I Championships | Hayward Field, Eugene, Oregon | 1st | 800 m | 1:43.55 | |
