= Joseph Deng =

Australian mid-distance runner

Personal information
- Nicknames: Dengfever, Deng
- Nationality: Australian
- Born: 7 July 1998 (age 28) Kakuma, Kenya
- Height: 183 cm (6 ft 0 in)

Sport
- Country: Australia
- Sport: Middle-distance running
- Event: 800 metres
- Club: St Kevins
- Coached by: Justin Rinaldi

Achievements and titles
- Regional finals: 2018 Commonwealth Games
- Personal bests: 1:43.99 AR (2023)

Joseph Deng (born 7 July 1998) is an Australian middle-distance runner.

In 2018, he broke the 800-metre Australian record (which had stood since the 1968 Mexico Olympics) and five years later bettered the record again to 1:43.99.

Deng also runs sprint distances, with 47.25 over the 400 m and a wind-aided 22.24 200 m.

== Early years ==
Deng was born in Kakuma, Kenya in a UNHCR refugee camp (first established in 1969). His mother left Sudan to escape the Second Sudanese Civil War.

In 2004, Deng's family moved to Toowoomba, Queensland when he was six and in 2010 he moved to Ipswich at the age of 12. He first attended Raceview State School, where he was encouraged to attend after-school athletics coaching at Ipswich Grammar School under the guidance of coach Di Sheppard. Deng was later granted a scholarship at Ipswich Grammar School and continued to be coached by Sheppard. His uncle John Deng also played a role in his development.

At the age of 17, Deng was selected in the Australian team for the 2016 IAAF World U20 Championships. He finished third in the 800m semi-final in 1:48.49 but failed to qualify for the final. Later in 2016, he ran a personal best of 1:46.51. Following this, he moved to Melbourne to be coached by Justin Rinaldi, who had coached Alexander Rowe to run 1:44.40.

== Breakthrough year ==
In 2018, Deng was controversially selected to compete in 800 m at the 2018 Commonwealth Games, Gold Coast, Queensland having not qualifying for the final at the Australian Athletics Championships. But in the B final he ran a personal best of 1:45.71 and was subsequently selected. At the Games, he finished seventh in the 800 m final in 1:47.20.

In July 2018, at the IAAF Diamond League meeting in Monaco, he finished seventh in the 800 m but broke the Australian record with a time of 1:44.21. The previous Australian record of 1:44.30 was set by Ralph Doubell in winning the gold medal at altitude at the 1968 Mexico Olympics and equalled in 2014 by Alexander Rowe in Monaco. Deng's record also broke New Zealander Peter Snell's Oceania record of 1:44.30 that had been set in Christchurch in 1962. At the end of the 2018 season, Deng had run four times under 1:45 in the year, the most ever by an Australian.

Following the political controversy surrounding purported "African crime gangs" in Melbourne, Deng was cited by the ABC as "a track star of boundless potential" and "proof positive of what immigrants can offer to their adopted country when given the opportunity."

== Return to prominence ==
In 2023, Deng recaptured the 800 m national record (which had been progressively improved by his training partner Peter Bol in 2021 and 2022) with a new personal best of 1:43.99 in Lyon, France.

He competed for Australia at the 2024 Summer Olympics.
