= 2022 World Athletics Championships – Men's 800 metres =

Men's 800 metres at the 2022 World Championships
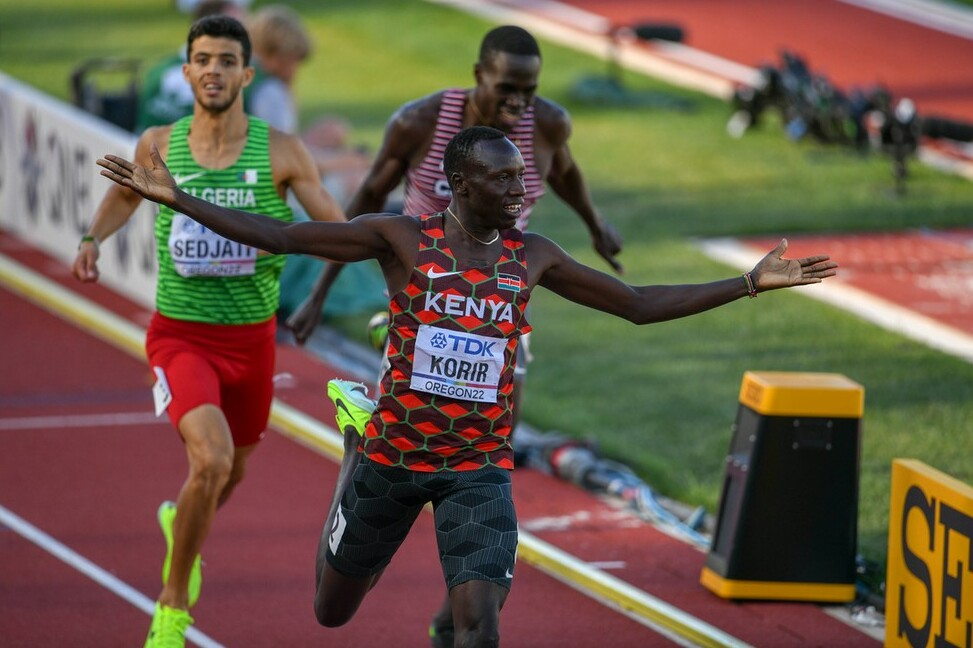
- Emmanuel Korir shortly after passing the finish line in the final.
- Venue: Hayward Field
- Dates: 20 July (heats); 21 July (semi-finals); 23 July (final)
- Competitors: 53 from 29 nations
- Winning time: 1:43.71

Medalists
gold medal	Emmanuel Korir	Kenya
silver medal	Djamel Sedjati	Algeria
bronze medal	Marco Arop	Canada

Video on YouTube Official Video

The men's 800 metres at the 2022 World Athletics Championships was held at the Hayward Field in Eugene from 20 to 23 July 2022.

== Summary ==
After missing the Olympics, defending champion Donavan Brazier was eliminated in the heats. World leader Max Burgin did not start. Aside from Olympic Champion Emmanuel Korir the rest of the Olympic and previous championships podium athletes did not make it to this event.

In the final, Slimane Moula came off the break looking to take the lead, tangling elbows with Peter Bol en route. His lead lasted through the second turn when Marco Arop went by, then taking the bell at 52.02. Gabriel Tual moved behind him on the rail, while Wycliffe Kinyamal Kisasy went to the outside. Arop opened up a metre gap, Korir followed Kisasy as the four broke away a couple of metres from the other half of the field down the backstretch. Korir poured it on through the final curve, passing Tual, then Kisasy, then 70 metres from home, Arop. As Korir pulled away, Arop tightened up and struggled home. Leading the second group before the turn, Djamel Sedjati also sped through the turn, catching Kaul just before the end of the turn. Kisasy faded on the home stretch, eventually finishing last, leaving the struggling Arop as his next target, caught 12 metres before the finish for silver. Dead last entering the turn, 17 year old Emmanuel Wanyonyi weaved his way through the crowd but didn't get to Arop in time to grab a medal.

== Records ==
Before the competition records were as follows:

Record	Athlete & Nat.	Perf.	Location	Date
World record	David Rudisha (KEN)	1:40.91	London, Great Britain	9 August 2012
Championship record	Donavan Brazier (USA)	1:42.34	Doha, Qatar	1 October 2019
World Leading	Max Burgin (GBR)	1:43.52	Turku, Finland	14 June 2022
African Record	David Rudisha (KEN)	1:40.91	London, Great Britain	9 August 2012
Asian Record	Yusuf Saad Kamel (BHR)	1:42.79	Monte Carlo, Monaco	29 July 2008
North, Central American and Caribbean record	Donavan Brazier (USA)	1:42.34	Doha, Qatar	1 October 2019
South American Record	Joaquim Cruz (BRA)	1:41.77	Cologne, West Germany	26 August 1984
European Record	Wilson Kipketer (DEN)	1:41.11	Cologne, Germany	24 August 1997
Oceanian record	Peter Bol (AUS)	1:44.00	Paris, France	18 June 2022

== Qualification standard ==
The standard to qualify automatically for entry was 1:45.20.

== Schedule ==
The event schedule, in local time (UTC−7), was as follows:

Date	Time	Round
20 July	17:20	Heats
21 July	19:00	Semi-finals
23 July	18:10	Final

== Results ==
=== Heats ===
The first 3 athletes in each heat (Q) and the next 6 fastest (q) qualify for the semi-finals.

Rank	Heat	Name	Nationality	Time	Notes
1	5	Marco Arop	Canada	1:44.56	Q
2	5	Jesús Tonatiú López	Mexico	1:44.67	Q, SB
3	5	Mark English	Ireland	1:44.76	Q, SB
4	5	Catalin Tecuceanu	Italy	1:44.83	q, PB
5	6	Slimane Moula	Algeria	1:44.90	Q
6	6	Wycliffe Kinyamal	Kenya	1:45.08	Q
7	6	Abdelati El Guesse	Morocco	1:45.25	Q, SB
8	5	Noah Kibet	Kenya	1:45.41	q
9	2	Peter Bol	Australia	1:45.50	Q
10	6	Daniel Rowden	Great Britain & N.I.	1:45.53	q, SB
11	2	Kyle Langford	Great Britain & N.I.	1:45.68	Q
12	2	Mariano García	Spain	1:45.74	Q
13	5	Andreas Kramer	Sweden	1:45.77	q
14	6	Tolesa Bodena	Ethiopia	1:45.81	q
15	2	Benjamin Robert	France	1:45.94	q
16	5	Yassine Hethat	Algeria	1:46.05	
17	3	Moad Zahafi	Morocco	1:46.15	Q
18	2	Abedin Mujezinović	Bosnia and Herzegovina	1:46.26	SB
19	3	Gabriel Tual	France	1:46.34	Q
20	4	Djamel Sedjati	Algeria	1:46.39	Q
21	3	Emmanuel Wanyonyi	Kenya	1:46.45	Q
22	4	Tony van Diepen	Netherlands	1:46.59	Q
23	4	Abdessalem Ayouni	Tunisia	1:46.59	Q
24	3	Eliott Crestan	Belgium	1:46.61	
25	4	Adrián Ben	Spain	1:46.71	
26	2	Donavan Brazier	United States	1:46.72	
27	6	Patryk Dobek	Poland	1:46.80	
28	3	Bryce Hoppel	United States	1:46.98	
29	4	Brandon Miller	United States	1:47.29	
30	3	Mateusz Borkowski	Poland	1:47.61	
31	4	Tshepo Tshite	South Africa	1:47.61	
32	4	Brad Mathas	New Zealand	1:47.70	
33	3	Navasky Anderson	Jamaica	1:48.37	
34	2	Patryk Sieradzki	Poland	1:48.78	
35	1	Emmanuel Korir	Kenya	1:49.05	Q
36	1	Elhassane Moujahid	Morocco	1:49.27	Q
37	1	Álvaro de Arriba	Spain	1:49.30	Q
38	1	Ermias Girma	Ethiopia	1:49.36	
39	6	Žan Rudolf	Slovenia	1:49.87	
40	1	Marc Reuther	Germany	1:50.75	
41	3	Brandon McBride	Canada	1:57.43	
42	1	Manuel Belo Amaral Ataide	Timor-Leste	1:58.91	SB
	5	Jonah Koech	United States		DQ
	2	Alex Amankwah	Ghana		DQ
	1	Max Burgin	Great Britain & N.I.		DNS

=== Semi-finals ===
The first 2 athletes in each heat (Q) and the next 2 fastest (q) qualify for the finals.

Rank	Heat	Name	Nationality	Time	Notes
1	3	Slimane Moula	Algeria	1:44.89	Q
2	3	Marco Arop	Canada	1:45.12	Q
3	1	Emmanuel Korir	Kenya	1:45.38	Q, SB
4	3	Emmanuel Wanyonyi	Kenya	1:45.42	q
5	2	Djamel Sedjati	Algeria	1:45.44	Q
6	1	Wycliffe Kinyamal	Kenya	1:45.49	Q
7	2	Gabriel Tual	France	1:45.53	Q
8	1	Peter Bol	Australia	1:45.58	q
9	3	Benjamin Robert	France	1:45.67	
10	3	Mark English	Ireland	1:45.78	
11	1	Kyle Langford	Great Britain & N.I.	1:45.91	
12	3	Abdessalem Ayouni	Tunisia	1:46.08	
13	1	Jesús Tonatiú López	Mexico	1:46.17	
14	2	Daniel Rowden	Great Britain & N.I.	1:46.27	
15	3	Álvaro de Arriba	Spain	1:46.30	
16	2	Catalin Tecuceanu	Italy	1:46.31	
17	2	Moad Zahafi	Morocco	1:46.35	
18	3	Abdelati El Guesse	Morocco	1:46.46	
19	2	Mariano García	Spain	1:46.70	
20	1	Tony van Diepen	Netherlands	1:46.70	
21	2	Andreas Kramer	Sweden	1:46.71	
22	2	Noah Kibet	Kenya	1:47.15	
23	1	Elhassane Moujahid	Morocco	1:47.18	
24	1	Tolesa Bodena	Ethiopia	1:50.55	

=== Final ===
Rank	Name	Nationality	Time	Notes
1st place, gold medalist(s)	Emmanuel Korir	Kenya	1:43.71	SB
2nd place, silver medalist(s)	Djamel Sedjati	Algeria	1:44.14	
3rd place, bronze medalist(s)	Marco Arop	Canada	1:44.28	
4	Emmanuel Wanyonyi	Kenya	1:44.54	
5	Slimane Moula	Algeria	1:44.85	
6	Gabriel Tual	France	1:45.49	
7	Peter Bol	Australia	1:45.51	
8	Wycliffe Kinyamal	Kenya	1:47.07	
