= Álvaro de Arriba =

Spanish middle-distance runner

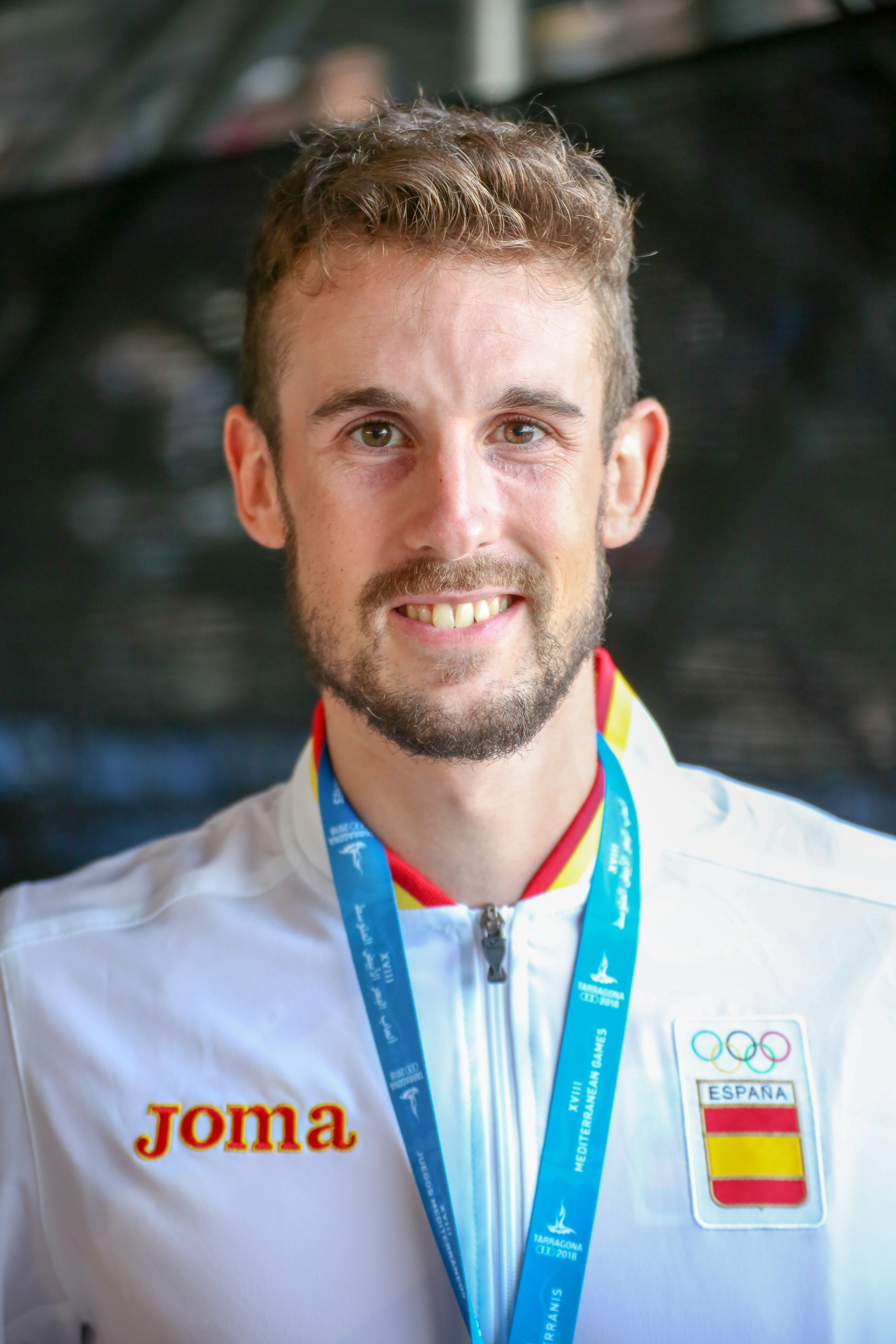
- Álvaro de Arriba in 2018

Personal information
- Full name: Álvaro de Arriba López
- Born: 2 June 1994 (age 32) Salamanca, Spain
- Height: 177 cm (5 ft 10 in)
- Weight: 69 kg (152 lb)

Sport
- Sport: Athletics
- Event: 800 metres
- Club: F. C. Barcelona
- Coached by: Juan Carlos Fuentes
Medal record
Men's athletics
Representing Spain
European Indoor Championships
Gold medal – first place	2019 Glasgow	800 m
Bronze medal – third place	2017 Belgrade	800 m
Mediterranean Games
Gold medal – first place	2018 Tarragona	800 m

Álvaro de Arriba López (born 2 June 1994 in Salamanca) is a Spanish middle-distance runner specialising in the 800 metres. He represented his country at the 2016 World Indoor Championships without qualifying for the final. He won bronze at the 2017 European Athletics Indoor Championships in Belgrade with a time of 1:49.68.

His personal bests in the event are 1:44.85 outdoors (Chorzów 2022) and 1:45.43 indoors (Salamanca 2018).

== Competition record ==
Year	Competition	Venue	Position	Event	Notes
Representing Spain
2013	European Junior Championships	Rieti, Italy	9th (sf)	800 m	1:50.97
2014	Ibero-American Championships	São Paulo, Brazil	5th	800 m	1:47.50
2015	European U23 Championships	Tallinn, Estonia	14th (sf)	800 m	1:50.37
2016	World Indoor Championships	Portland, United States	13th (h)	800 m i	1:52.60
2016	European Championships	Amsterdam, Netherlands	7th	800 m	1:47.58
2016	Olympic Games	Rio de Janeiro, Brazil	20th (h)	800 m	1:46.86
2017	European Indoor Championships	Belgrade, Serbia	3rd	800 m i	1:49.68
2017	World Championships	London, United Kingdom	16th (sf)	800 m	1:46.64
2018	World Indoor Championships	Birmingham, United Kingdom	5th	800 m i	1:48.51
2018	Mediterranean Games	Tarragona, Spain	1st	800 m	1:47.43
2018	European Championships	Berlin, Germany	7th	800 m	1:46.41
2019	European Indoor Championships	Glasgow, United Kingdom	1st	800 m i	1:46.83
2019	World Championships	Doha, Qatar	16th (sf)	800 m	1:46.09
2021	European Indoor Championships	Toruń, Poland	21st (h)	800 m i	1:49.99
2022	World Indoor Championships	Belgrade, Serbia	4th	800 m i	1:46.58
2022	Ibero-American Championships	La Nucía, Spain	1st	800 m	1:45.19
2022	World Championships	Eugene, United States	15th (sf)	800 m	1:46.30
2022	European Championships	Munich, Germany	22nd (h)	800 m	1:47.94
2024	European Championships	Rome, Italy	4th	800 m	1:45.64
2025	European Indoor Championships	Apeldoorn, Netherlands	21st (h)	800 m i	1:48.40
2025	World Indoor Championships	Nanjing, China	8th (sf)	800 m	1:47.58
