= 2021 European Athletics Indoor Championships – Men's 800 metres =

Men's 800 metres at the 2021 European Athletics Indoor Championships
- Venue: Arena Toruń
- Location: Toruń, Poland
- Dates: 5 March 2021 (round 1); 6 March 2021 (semi-finals); 7 March 2021 (final)
- Competitors: 39 from 17 nations
- Winning time: 1:46.81

Medalists
| gold medal | Patryk Dobek | Poland |
| silver medal | Mateusz Borkowski | Poland |
| bronze medal | Jamie Webb | Great Britain |

The men's 800 metres event at the 2021 European Athletics Indoor Championships was held on 5 March 2021 at 19:55 (heats), on 6 March 2019 at 19:25 (semi-finals), and on 7 March at 18:25 (final) local time.

== Records ==
Standing records prior to the 2021 European Athletics Indoor Championships
| World record | Wilson Kipketer (DEN) | 1:42.67 | Paris, France | 9 March 1997 |
| European record | Wilson Kipketer (DEN) | 1:42.67 | Paris, France | 9 March 1997 |
| Championship record | Paweł Czapiewski (POL) | 1:44.78 | Vienna, Austria | 3 March 2002 |
| World Leading | Elliot Giles (GBR) | 1:43.63 | Toruń, Poland | 17 February 2021 |
| European Leading | Elliot Giles (GBR) | 1:43.63 | Toruń, Poland | 17 February 2021 |

== Results ==
=== Heats ===
Qualification: First 3 in each heat (Q) advance to the Semifinals.

| Rank | Heat | Athlete | Nationality | Time | Note |
|---|---|---|---|---|---|
| 1 | 5 | Andreas Kramer | Sweden | 1:47.55 | Q |
| 2 | 5 | Mateusz Borkowski | Poland | 1:47.78 | Q |
| 3 | 6 | Eliott Crestan | Belgium | 1:48.32 | Q |
| 4 | 5 | Pablo Sánchez-Valladares | Spain | 1:48.43 | Q |
| 5 | 6 | Jamie Webb | Great Britain | 1:48.72 | Q |
| 6 | 6 | Simone Barontini | Italy | 1:48.78 | Q |
| 7 | 2 | Patryk Dobek | Poland | 1:48.85 | Q |
| 8 | 6 | Filip Šnejdr | Czech Republic | 1:48.87 | |
| 9 | 5 | Gabriele Aquaro | Italy | 1:48.88 | |
| 10 | 2 | Pierre-Ambroise Bosse | France | 1:49.08 | Q |
| 11 | 6 | Joakim Andersson | Sweden | 1:49.48 | |
| 12 | 1 | Amel Tuka | Bosnia and Herzegovina | 1:49.58 | Q |
| 13 | 4 | Guy Learmonth | Great Britain | 1:49.66 | Q |
| 14 | 1 | Oleh Myronets | Ukraine | 1:49.76 | Q |
| 15 | 1 | Benjamin Robert | France | 1:49.76 | Q |
| 16 | 2 | Mark English | Ireland | 1:49.79 | Q |
| 17 | 5 | Yevhen Hutsol | Ukraine | 1:49.82 | |
| 18 | 3 | Mariano García | Spain | 1:49.86 | Q |
| 19 | 1 | Žan Rudolf | Slovenia | 1:49.88 | |
| 20 | 3 | Cian McPhillips | Ireland | 1:49.98 | Q |
| 21 | 1 | Álvaro de Arriba | Spain | 1:49.99 | |
| 22 | 6 | Oskar Schwarzer | Germany | 1:50.09 | |
| 23 | 3 | Christoph Kessler | Germany | 1:50.12 | Q |
| 24 | 5 | Djoao Lobles | Netherlands | 1:50.29 | |
| 25 | 3 | Aurele Vandeputte | Belgium | 1:50.30 | |
| 26 | 2 | Thijmen Kupers | Netherlands | 1:50.38 | |
| 27 | 3 | Balázs Vindics | Hungary | 1:50.40 | |
| 28 | 4 | Adam Kszczot | Poland | 1:50.53 | Q |
| 29 | 3 | Jürgen Wielart | Netherlands | 1:50.65 | |
| 30 | 4 | Nasredine Khatir | France | 1:50.97 | Q |
| 31 | 4 | Marc Reuther | Germany | 1:50.98 | |
| 32 | 4 | John Fitzsimons | Ireland | 1:51.00 | |
| 33 | 4 | Felix Francois | Sweden | 1:51.04 | |
| 34 | 1 | Lukáš Hodboď | Czech Republic | 1:51.59 | |
| 35 | 1 | Tamás Kazi | Hungary | 1:51.85 | |
| 36 | 3 | Pol Moya Betriu | Andorra | 1:51.97 | |
| 37 | 2 | Tobias Grønstad | Norway | 1:52.44 | |
| 38 | 2 | Tomáš Vystrk | Czech Republic | 1:52.48 | |
| | 2 | Abedin Mujezinović | Bosnia and Herzegovina | DQ | |

=== Semifinals ===
Qualification: First 2 in each heat (Q) advance to the Final.

| Rank | Heat | Athlete | Nationality | Time | Note |
|---|---|---|---|---|---|
| 1 | 2 | Mateusz Borkowski | Poland | 1:45.79 | Q, PB |
| 2 | 2 | Jamie Webb | Great Britain | 1:45.99 | Q |
| 3 | 2 | Andreas Kramer | Sweden | 1:46.87 | |
| 4 | 1 | Amel Tuka | Bosnia and Herzegovina | 1:47.55 | Q |
| 5 | 1 | Patryk Dobek | Poland | 1:47.56 | Q |
| 6 | 1 | Mariano García | Spain | 1:47.63 | |
| 7 | 3 | Pierre-Ambroise Bosse | France | 1:47.86 | Q |
| 8 | 1 | Guy Learmonth | Great Britain | 1:47.92 | |
| 9 | 3 | Adam Kszczot | Poland | 1:47.98 | Q |
| 10 | 2 | Cian McPhillips | Ireland | 1:48.06 | AJR |
| 11 | 3 | Eliott Crestan | Belgium | 1:48.12 | |
| 12 | 1 | Benjamin Robert | France | 1:48.25 | |
| 13 | 3 | Mark English | Ireland | 1:48.99 | |
| 14 | 3 | Christoph Kessler | Germany | 1:49.46 | |
| 15 | 3 | Simone Barontini | Italy | 1:49.51 | |
| 16 | 2 | Nasredine Khatir | France | 1:49.73 | |
| 17 | 1 | Oleh Myronets | Ukraine | 1:51.19 | |
| 18 | 2 | Pablo Sánchez-Valladares | Spain | 2:05.11 | |

=== Final ===
| Rank | Athlete | Nationality | Time | Note |
|---|---|---|---|---|
| 1st place, gold medalist(s) | Patryk Dobek | Poland | 1:46.81 | PB |
| 2nd place, silver medalist(s) | Mateusz Borkowski | Poland | 1:46.90 | |
| 3rd place, bronze medalist(s) | Jamie Webb | Great Britain | 1:46.95 | |
| 4 | Adam Kszczot | Poland | 1:47.23 | |
| 5 | Amel Tuka | Bosnia and Herzegovina | 1:47.37 | |
| 6 | Pierre-Ambroise Bosse | France | 1:50.13 | |
