= 2019 European Athletics Indoor Championships – Men's 800 metres =

The men's 800 metres event at the 2019 European Athletics Indoor Championships was held on 1 March 2019 at 19:48 (heats), on 2 March at 18:25 (semifinals) and on 3 March 2019 at 18:57 (final) local time.

== Medalists ==
Gold	Silver	Bronze
Álvaro de Arriba; Spain	Jamie Webb; Great Britain	Mark English; Ireland

== Records ==
Standing records prior to the 2019 European Athletics Indoor Championships
World record	Wilson Kipketer (DEN)	1:42.67	Paris, France	9 March 1997
European record	Wilson Kipketer (DEN)	1:42.67	Paris, France	9 March 1997
Championship record	Paweł Czapiewski (POL)	1:44.78	Vienna, Austria	3 March 2002
World Leading	Michael Saruni (KEN)	1:43.98	New York City, United States	9 February 2019
European Leading	Andreas Kramer (SWE)	1:46.52	Karlsruhe, Germany	2 February 2019

== Results ==
=== Heats ===
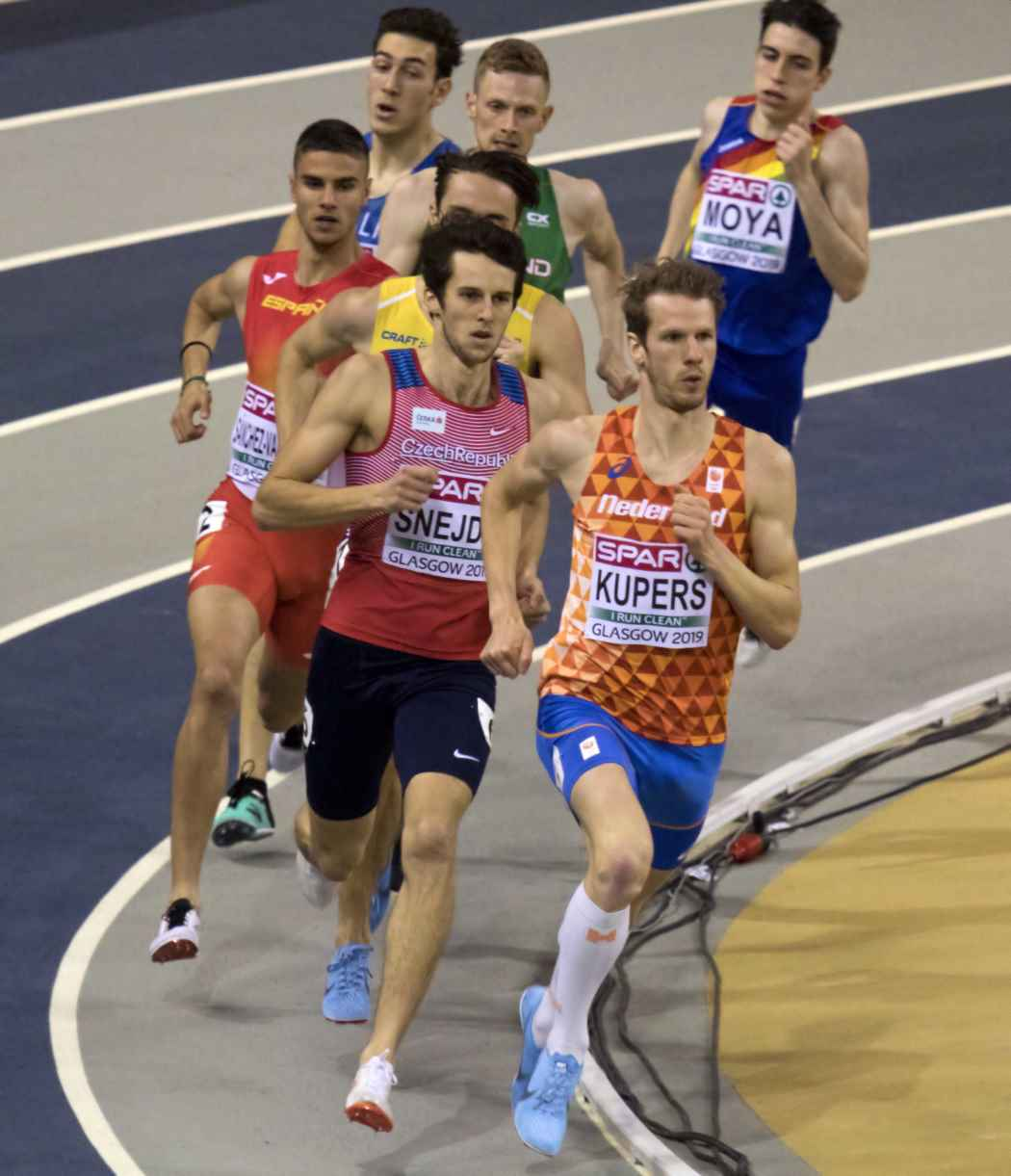
Heat 4

Qualification: First 2 in each heat (Q) and the next 2 fastest (q) advance to the Semifinal.

Rank	Heat	Athlete	Nationality	Time	Note
1	1	Amel Tuka	Bosnia and Herzegovina	1:47.95	Q
2	5	Jamie Webb	Great Britain	1:47.96	Q
3	1	Mariano García	Spain	1:48.09	Q
4	5	Álvaro de Arriba	Spain	1:48.15	Q
5	1	Andreas Bube	Denmark	1:48.33	q
6	1	Joe Reid	Great Britain	1:48.56	q
7	2	Christoph Kessler	Germany	1:48.62	Q
8	4	Andreas Kramer	Sweden	1:48.67	Q
9	4	Filip Šnejdr	Czech Republic	1:48.71	Q
10	4	Thijmen Kupers	Netherlands	1:48.72	
11	5	Mateusz Borkowski	Poland	1:48.82	
12	4	Pablo Sánchez-Valladares	Spain	1:48.90	
12	5	Nasredine Khatir	France	1:48.90	
14	2	Guy Learmonth	Great Britain	1:48.98	Q
15	5	Markus Einan	Norway	1:49.14	
16	2	Abedin Mujezinović	Bosnia and Herzegovina	1:49.26	PB
17	1	Lukáš Hodboď	Czech Republic	1:49.31	
18	2	Michał Rozmys	Poland	1:49.35	
19	3	Mark English	Ireland	1:49.38	Q
20	1	Erik Martinsson	Sweden	1:49.39	
21	1	Salih Teksöz	Turkey	1:49.54	
22	3	Aymeric Lusine	France	1:49.62	Q
23	2	Tamás Kazi	Hungary	1:49.66	
24	4	Zak Curran	Ireland	1:49.77	
25	3	Balázs Vindics	Hungary	1:49.98	
26	3	Yevhen Hutsol	Ukraine	1:50.29	
27	5	Richard Douma	Netherlands	1:50.36	
28	3	Thomas Roth	Norway	1:50.42	
29	2	Conall Kirk	Ireland	1:50.50	
30	4	Simone Barontini	Italy	1:50.54	
31	3	Robert Farken	Germany	1:51.02	
32	5	Žan Rudolf	Slovenia	1:51.75	
33	4	Pol Moya	Andorra	1:53.21	
	2	Musa Hajdari	Kosovo	DNS	

=== Semifinals ===
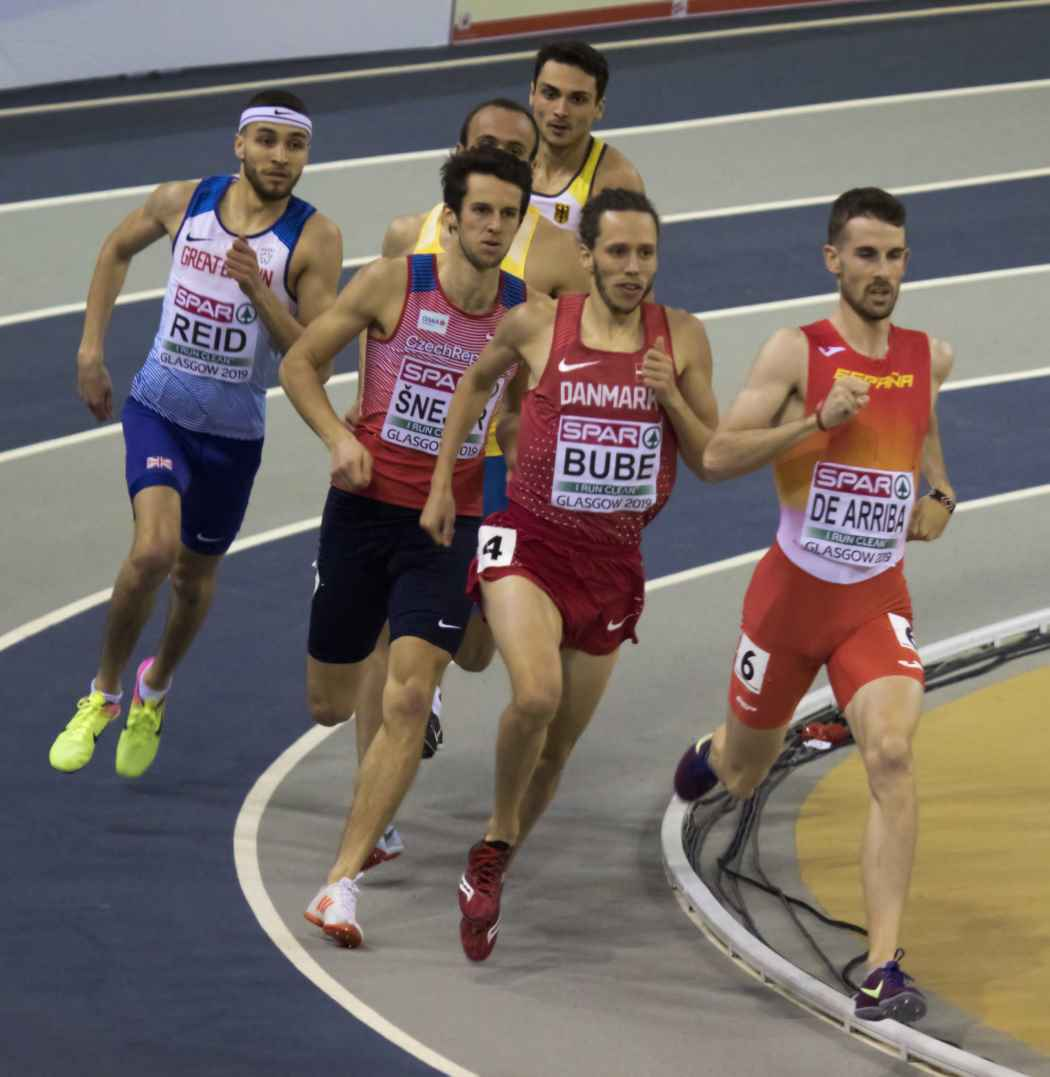
Semifinal 1

Qualification: First 3 in each heat (Q) advance to the Final.

Rank	Heat	Athlete	Nationality	Time	Note
1	2	Mariano García	Spain	1:48.84	Q
2	2	Jamie Webb	Great Britain	1:48.85	Q
3	2	Andreas Kramer	Sweden	1:49.06	Q
4	2	Aymeric Lusine	France	1:49.48	
5	1	Álvaro de Arriba	Spain	1:50.12	Q
6	1	Andreas Bube	Denmark	1:50.18	Q
7	1	Amel Tuka	Bosnia and Herzegovina	1:50.41	Q
8	1	Christoph Kessler	Germany	1:50.62	
9	2	Mark English	Ireland	1:50.70	qR
10	1	Filip Šnejdr	Czech Republic	1:50.72	
11	1	Joe Reid	Great Britain	1:51.26	
	2	Guy Learmonth	Great Britain	DNF	

=== Final ===
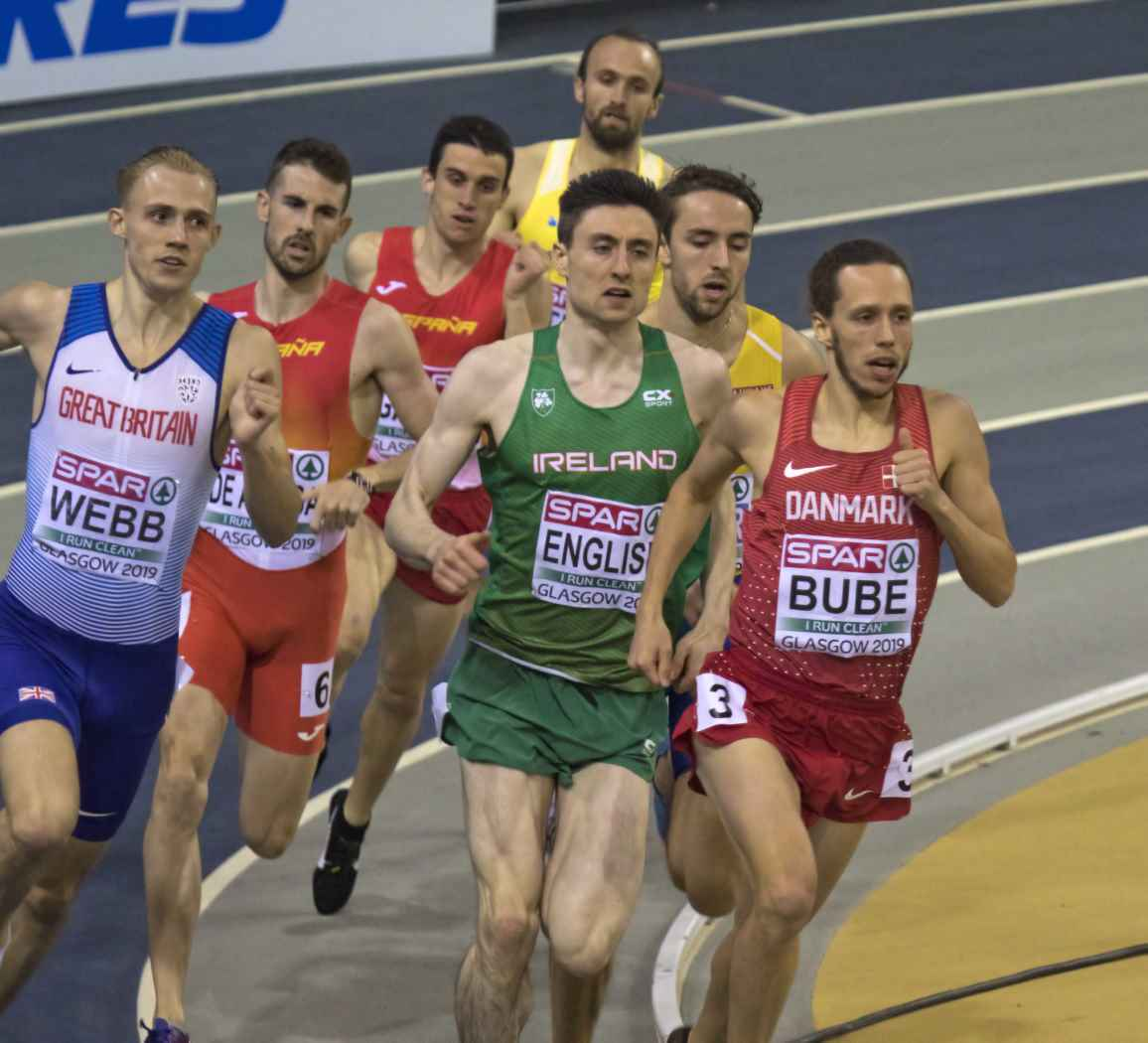
The final

Rank	Name	Nationality	Time	Notes
1st place, gold medalist(s)	Álvaro de Arriba	Spain	1:46.83	
2nd place, silver medalist(s)	Jamie Webb	Great Britain	1:47.13	PB
3rd place, bronze medalist(s)	Mark English	Ireland	1:47.39	
4	Mariano García	Spain	1:47.58	PB
5	Andreas Bube	Denmark	1:47.67	
6	Amel Tuka	Bosnia and Herzegovina	1:47.91	
7	Andreas Kramer	Sweden	1:48.06	
