= Andreas Kramer =

Swedish middle-distance runner

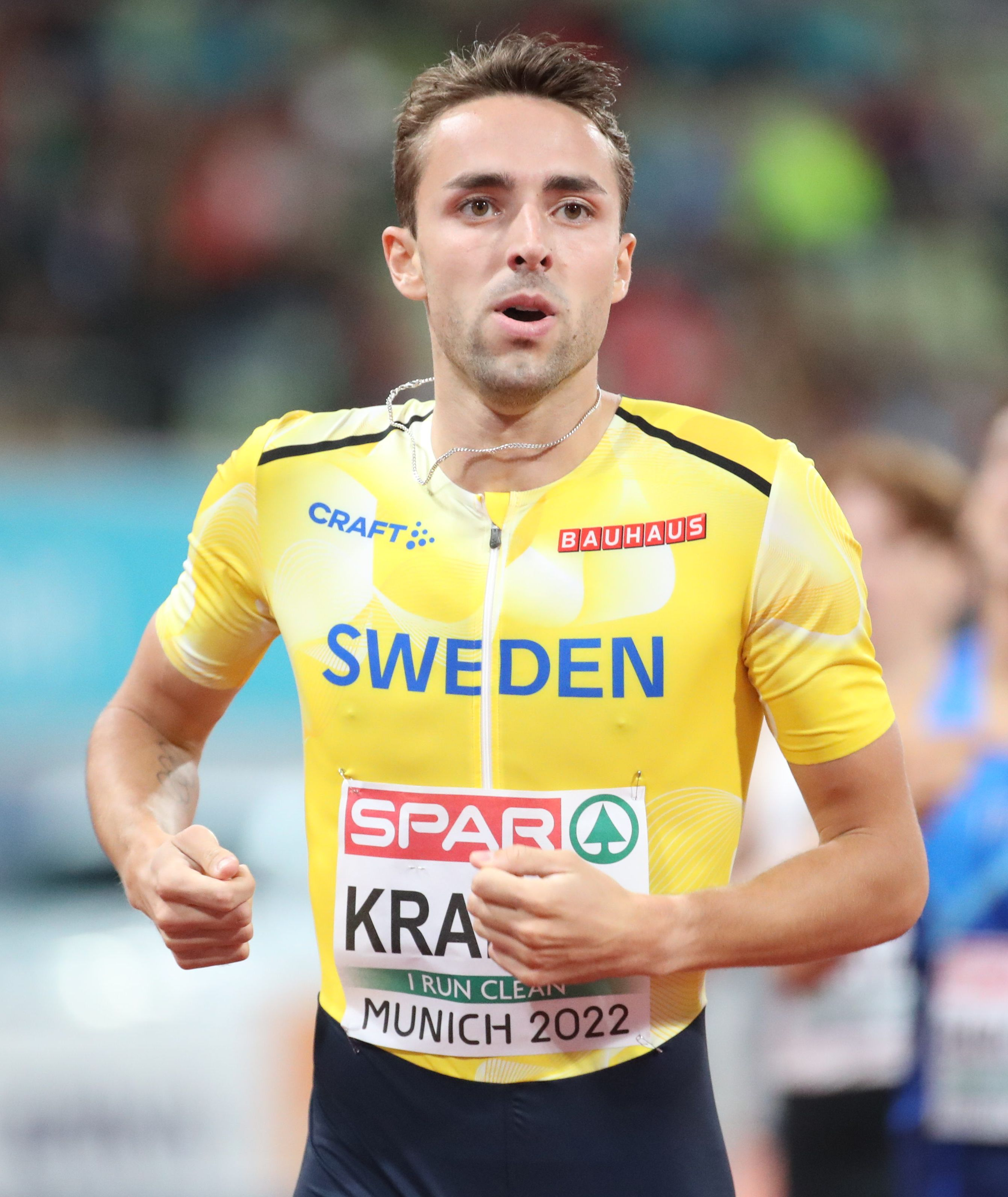
- Andreas Kramer in 2022

Personal information
- Born: 13 April 1997 (age 29)

Sport
- Sport: Track
- Event: 800 metres
- Club: Djurgårdens IF
Medal record
European Championships
Silver medal – second place	2018 Berlin	800 m
World Indoor Championships
Silver medal – second place	2024 Glasgow	800 m

Andreas Kramer (born 13 April 1997) is a Swedish middle-distance runner specialising in the 800 metres. He won the silver medal at the 2018 European Championships and the silver medal at the 2024 World Indoor Championships. With the performance of 1:49.62 he is the current European junior indoor record holder.

In July 2017, Kramer beat the Swedish record on 800 metres, setting a new time at 1:45.13. During 2024, he lowered the Swedish record mark on 800 metres several times to a record of 1:43.13, set in July 2024. Kramer represented Ullevi FK until November 2024, when he joined Djurgårdens IF together with Simon Sundström and Saga Provci.

Kramer has won the 800-metres distance at the Swedish Athletics Championships on eight occasions, from 2017 to 2023 and in 2025.

== Competition record ==
Year	Competition	Venue	Position	Event	Notes
Representing Sweden
2015	European Indoor Championships	Prague, Czech Republic	26th (h)	800 m	1:50.34
2015	European Junior Championships	Eskilstuna, Sweden	6th	800 m	1:50.66
2016	World Indoor Championships	Portland, United States	7th (h)	800 m	1:49.46
2016	World U20 Championships	Bydgoszcz, Poland	9th (sf)	800 m	1:47.65
2017	European Indoor Championships	Belgrade, Serbia	8th (sf)	800 m	1:49.53
2017	European U23 Championships	Bydgoszcz, Poland	1st	800 m	1:48.15
2017	World Championships	London, England	11th (sf)	800 m	1:46.25
2018	World Indoor Championships	Birmingham, United Kingdom	7th (h)	800 m	1:47.21
2018	European Championships	Berlin, Germany	2nd	800 m	1:45.03, NR
2019	European Indoor Championships	Glasgow, United Kingdom	7th	800 m	1:48.06
2019	European U23 Championships	Gävle, Sweden	10th (h)	800 m	1:50.17
2019	World Championships	Doha, Qatar	28th (h)	800 m	1:46.74
2021	European Indoor Championships	Toruń, Poland	3rd (sf)	800 m	1:46.87
2021	Olympic Games	Tokyo, Japan	30th (h)	800 m	1:46.44
2022	World Indoor Championships	Belgrade, Serbia	5th	800 m	1:46.76
2022	World Championships	Eugene, United States	21st (sf)	800 m	1:46.71
2022	European Championships	Munich, Germany	4th	800 m	1:45.38
2023	European Indoor Championships	Istanbul, Turkey	5th	800 m	1:48.15
2023	World Championships	Budapest, Hungary	15th (sf)	800 m	1:44.57
2024	World Indoor Championships	Glasgow, United Kingdom	2nd	800 m	1:45.27
2024	European Championships	Rome, Italy	5th	800 m	1:45.70
2024	Olympic Games	Paris, France	23rd (sf)	800 m	1:46.52
2025	European Indoor Championships	Apeldoorn, Netherlands	25th (h)	800 m	1:50.17
2025	World Championships	Tokyo, Japan	47th (h)	800 m	1:46.84
2026	European Championships	Birmingham, United Kingdom	8th (sf)	800 m	1:44.67

== Personal bests ==
Outdoor

- 800 metres – 1:43.66 NR (Paris 2024)
- 1000 metres – 2:16.96 NR (Gothenburg 2023)
- 1500 metres – 3:47.28 (Stockholm 2015)

Indoor

- 400 metres – 47.75 (Ulsteinvik 2019)
- 800 metres – 1:45.09 NR (Torun 2021)
- 1500 metres – 3:46.62 (Sätra 2017)
