= Pierre-Ambroise Bosse =

French middle-distance runner

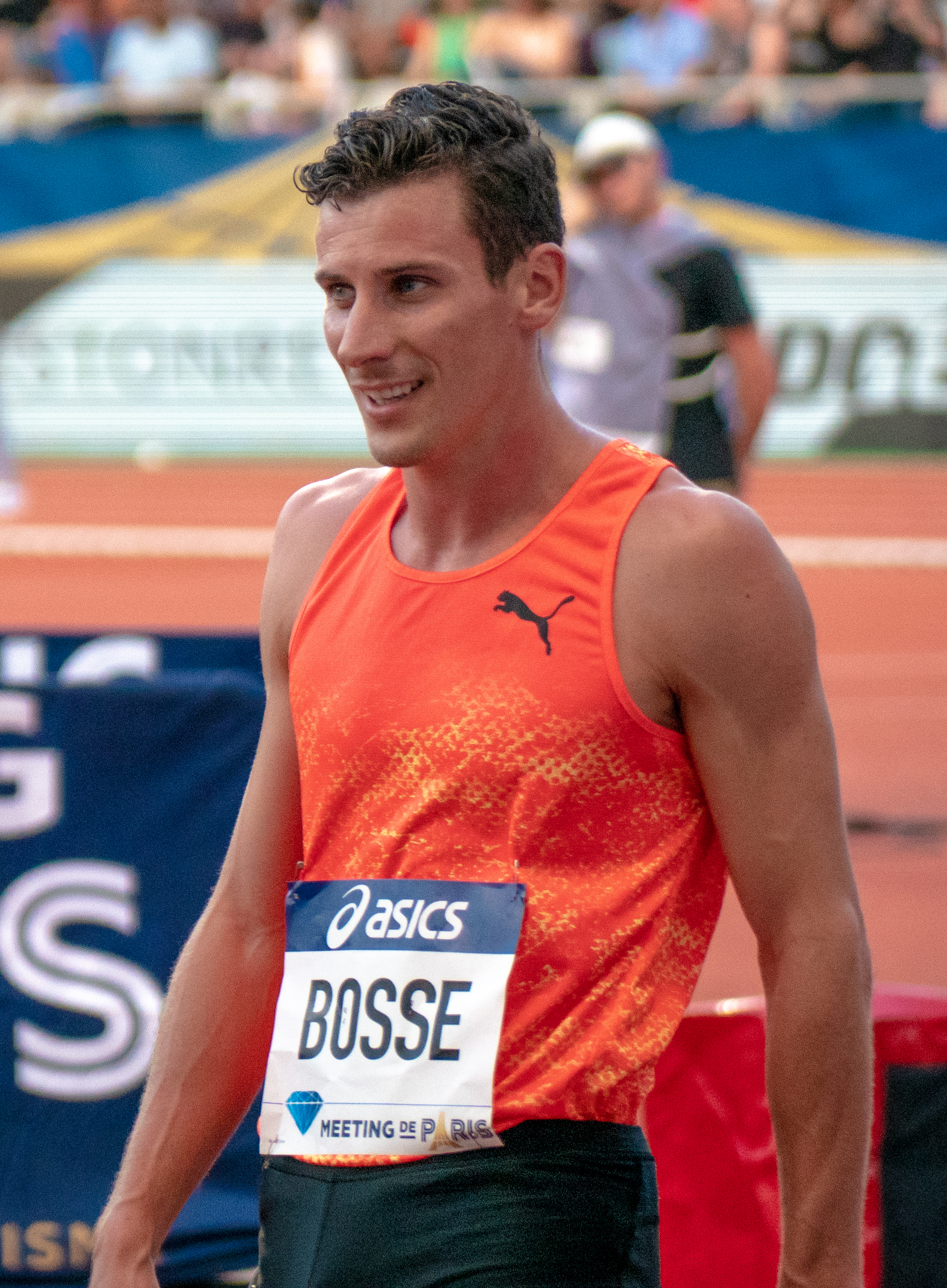
- Bosse in 2018

Personal information
- Born: 11 May 1992 (age 34) Nantes, France
- Height: 1.85 m (6 ft 1 in)
- Weight: 68 kg (150 lb)

Sport
- Country: France
- Sport: Track
- Event: 800 meters
- Retired: December 2023

Achievements and titles
- Personal bests: Outdoor; 400 m: 47.54 (Marseille 2016); 600 m: 1:13.21 (Birmingham 2014) NR; 800 m: 1:42.53 (Monaco 2014) NR; 1000 metres: 2:15.31 (Ostrava 2014); Indoor; 600 m: 1:15.63 (Moskva 2013); 800 m: 1:45.95 (Madrid 2021); 1000 metres: 2:17.63 (New York 2014)
Medal record
Men's athletics
Representing France
World Championships
Gold medal – first place	2017 London	800 m
European Championships
Bronze medal – third place	2012 Helsinki	800 m
Bronze medal – third place	2018 Berlin	800 m

Pierre-Ambroise Bosse (born 11 May 1992) is a retired French middle-distance runner. He won a gold medal in the 800 metres at the 2017 World Athletics Championship. Bosse set the French national record for the 800 m in 2014, with his time of 1.42.53.

== Career ==
Bosse won the bronze medal in the 800 metres at the 2012 European Championships held in Helsinki.

On 18 July 2014, Bosse ran his personal best time (1:42.53) at the 800 metres race at the Herculis meet, a Diamond League meeting held in Monaco; he finished the race in second place behind Nijel Amos of Botswana. Both Amos's and Bosse's times at this meeting were the first and second fastest 800 metre times in the world for 2014; with Bosse running fast enough to be the new French national record holder for the 800 metres outdoors.

On 8 August 2017, he won the men's 800 m at the IAAF World Championships in London in a time of 1:44.67. With the absence of David Rudisha due to injury the 800 m final was relatively wide open. However, with Bosse not having run close to the world lead, and having to start his season late due to injury he was not considered a favorite. The final went out at a moderate pace with the leader Brandon McBride passing through 400 m in 50.76. While Kipyegon Bett and Nijel Amos battled each other as they took the lead, Bosse ran a clear path around the outside to take the lead going into the final turn. He emerged from the turn with a three-metre lead on the battle and neither could muster a challenge. His final challengers were Adam Kszczot and Kyle Langford, making a late run from the back of the pack, but Bosse was too far ahead to see the challengers. He looked at the scoreboard, pointing at himself in disbelief.

Bosse announced his retirement from the sport in December 2023, following a string of injuries.

== International competitions ==
Year	Competition	Venue	Position	Event	Notes
Representing France
2010	World Junior Championships	Moncton, Canada	8th	800 m	1:53.52
2011	European Junior Championships	Tallinn, Estonia	1st	800 m	1:47.14
2012	European Championships	Helsinki, Finland	3rd	800 m	1:48.83
2012	Olympic Games	London, United Kingdom	11th (sf)	800 m	1:45.10
2013	European U23 Championships	Tampere, Finland	1st	800 m	1:45.79
2013	World Championships	Moscow, Russia	7th	800 m	1:44.79
2014	European Championships	Zürich, Switzerland	8th	800 m	1:46.55
2015	World Championships	Beijing, China	5th	800 m	1:46.63
2016	European Championships	Amsterdam, Netherlands	5th	800 m	1:45.79
2016	Olympic Games	Rio de Janeiro, Brazil	4th	800 m	1:43.41
2017	World Championships	London, United Kingdom	1st	800 m	1:44.67
2018	European Championships	Berlin, Germany	3rd	800 m	1:45.30
2019	World Championships	Doha, Qatar	22nd (sf)	800 m	1:47.60
2021	European Indoor Championships	Toruń, Poland	6th	800 m	1:50.13
2021	Olympic Games	Tokyo, Japan	22nd (sf)	800 m	1:48.62
