= Patryk Dobek =

Polish athlete (born 1994)

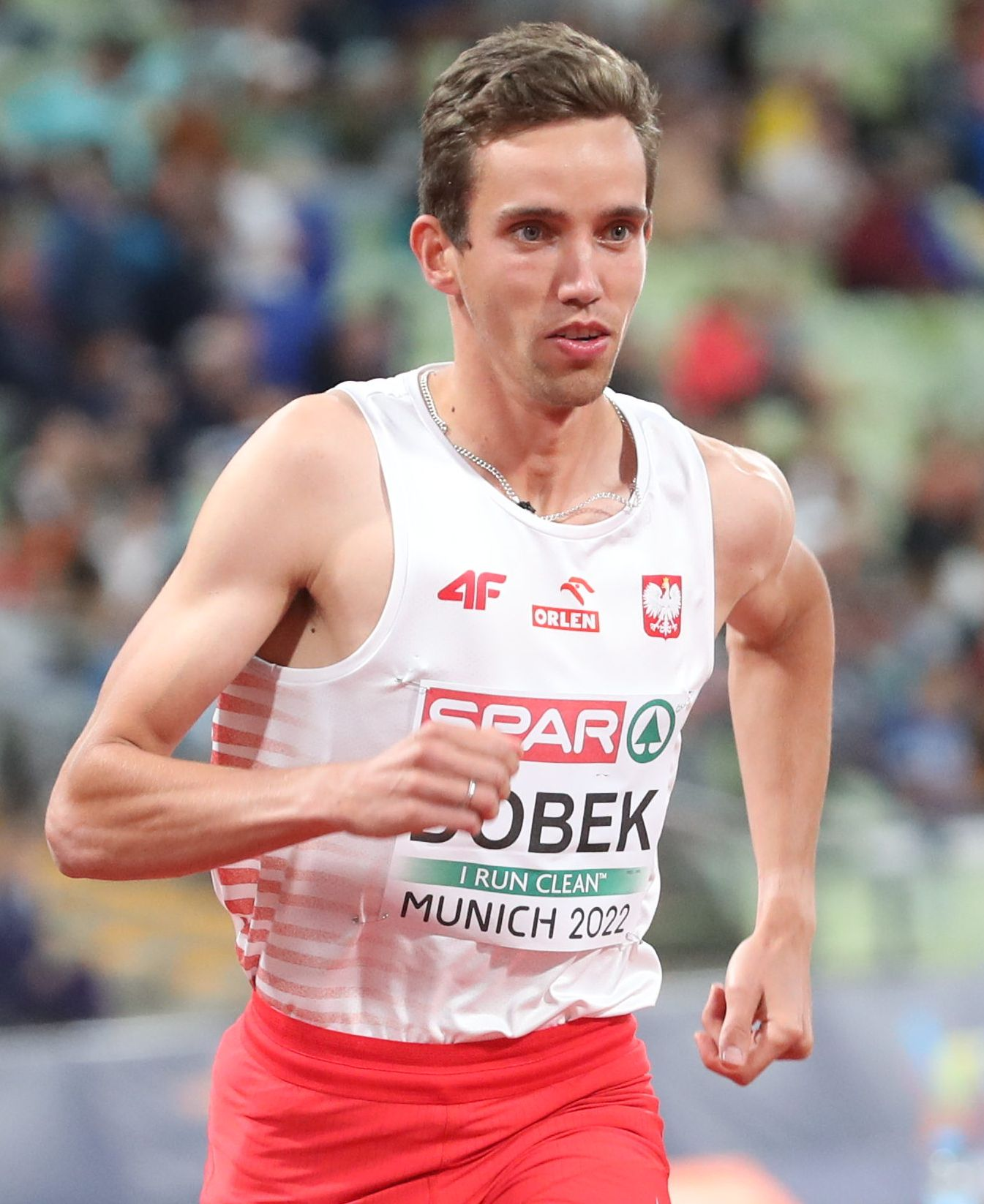
- Dobek at the European Championships 2022

Personal information
- Nationality: Polish
- Born: 13 February 1994 (age 32) Kościerzyna, Poland
- Height: 1.86 m (6 ft 1 in)
- Weight: 72 kg (159 lb)

Sport
- Sport: Track and field
- Event: Sprints

Achievements and titles
- Personal best: 400 m: 46.12 (Bialogard 2019) 400 m hurdles: 48.40 (Beijing 2015) 800 m: 1:43:73 (Chorzów 2021)
Medal record
Men's athletics
Representing Poland
Olympic Games
Bronze medal – third place	2020 Tokyo	800 m
World Relays
Gold medal – first place	2021 Chorzów	2 × 2 × 400 m relay
European Indoor Championships
Gold medal – first place	2021 Toruń	800 m
European Team Championships
Gold medal – first place	2019 Bydgoszcz	400 m hurdles
Silver medal – second place	2015 Cheboksary	400 m hurdles
Bronze medal – third place	2015 Cheboksary	4 × 400 m
Bronze medal – third place	2019 Bydgoszcz	4 × 400 m
World Youth Championships
Bronze medal – third place	2011 Lille	400 m
European Athletics U23 Championships
Silver medal – second place	2015 Tallinn	4 × 400 m
Summer Universiade
Bronze medal – third place	2019 Naples	400 m hurdles
Bronze medal – third place	2019 Naples	4 × 400 m relay
Polish Athletics Championships
Gold medal – first place	2014 Szczecin	400 m hurdles
Gold medal – first place	2015 Kraków	400 m hurdles
Gold medal – first place	2016 Bydgoszcz	400 m hurdles
Gold medal – first place	2017 Białystok	400 m hurdles
Gold medal – first place	2018 Lublin	400 m hurdles
Gold medal – first place	2019 Radom	400 m hurdles
Gold medal – first place	2020 Włocławek	400 m hurdles
Gold medal – first place	2021 Poznań	800 m
Gold medal – first place	2022 Suwałki	800 m
Polish Indoor Athletics Championships
Gold medal – first place	2021 Toruń	800 m
Gold medal – first place	2022 Toruń	800 m
Bronze medal – third place	2014 Sopot	4 × 400 m

Patryk Dobek (born 13 February 1994) is a Polish athlete and soldier. He is specialising in the 400 metres, 800 metres and 400 metres hurdles. He won the bronze medal at the 2020 Summer Olympics in the 800 metres event.

== Achievements ==
Year	Competition	Venue	Position	Event	Notes
Representing Poland
2011	World Youth Championships	Lille, France	3rd	400 m	46.67
2011	World Youth Championships	Lille, France	4th	Medley relay	1:52.42
2012	World Junior Championships	Barcelona, Spain	8th (sf)	400 m	46.56
2012	World Junior Championships	Barcelona, Spain	2nd	4 × 400 m relay	3:05.05 (NJR)
2013	European Junior Championships	Rieti, Italy	2nd	400 m	46.15
2013	European Junior Championships	Rieti, Italy	2nd	4 × 400 m relay	3:05.07
2014	World Indoor Championships	Sopot, Poland	4th (h)	4 × 400 m relay	3:06.50
2014	European Championships	Zürich, Switzerland	7th (sf)	400 m hurdles	49.13
2015	European U23 Championships	Tallinn, Estonia	1st	400 m hurdles	48.84
2015	European U23 Championships	Tallinn, Estonia	2nd	4 × 400 m relay	3:05.35
2015	World Championships	Beijing, China	7th	400 m hurdles	49.14
2016	Olympic Games	Rio de Janeiro, Brazil	42nd (h)	400 m hurdles	50.66
2017	World Championships	London, United Kingdom	11th (sf)	400 m hurdles	49.40
2017	Universiade	Taipei, Taiwan	5th	400 m hurdles	49.51
2018	European Championships	Berlin, Germany	5th	400 m hurdles	48.59
2019	Universiade	Naples, Italy	3rd	400 m hurdles	48.99
2019	Universiade	Naples, Italy	3rd	4 × 400 m relay	3:03.35
2019	World Championships	Doha, Qatar	22nd (sf)	400 m hurdles	50.18
2021	European Indoor Championships	Toruń, Poland	1st	800 m	1:46.81
2021	Olympic Games	Tokyo, Japan	3rd	800 m	1:45.39
2022	World Championships	Eugene, United States	27th (h)	800 m	1:46.80
2022	European Championships	Munich, Germany	12th (sf)	800 m	1:48.63
