= Athletics at the 2019 Summer Universiade – Men's 800 metres =

The men's 800 metres event at the 2019 Summer Universiade was held on 11, 12 and 13 July at the Stadio San Paolo in Naples.

== Medalists ==
Gold	Silver	Bronze
Mohamed Belbachir; Algeria	Moad Zahafi; Morocco	Lukáš Hodboď; Czech Republic

== Results ==
=== Heats ===
Qualification: First 4 in each heat (Q) and next 4 fastest (q) qualified for the semifinals.

Rank	Heat	Name	Nationality	Time	Notes
1	3	Gorata Gabankitse	Botswana	1:49.98	Q, SB
2	3	Aymeric Lusine	France	1:49.99	Q
3	2	Mohamed Belbachir	Algeria	1:50.27	Q
4	2	Lukáš Hodboď	Czech Republic	1:50.51	Q
5	4	Moad Zahafi	Morocco	1:50.70	Q
6	2	Emmanuel Osuje	Uganda	1:50.72	Q
7	3	Jye Perrott	Australia	1:50.77	Q
8	3	Bram Buigel	Netherlands	1:50.90	Q
9	2	Li Junlin	China	1:50.92	Q
10	1	Matheus Americo	Brazil	1:51.05	Q
11	1	Christian Clausen	Denmark	1:51.22	Q
12	2	Jirayu Pleenaram	Thailand	1:51.23	q, PB
13	1	Mason Cohen	Australia	1:51.54	Q
14	4	Oussama Cherrad	Algeria	1:51.61	Q
15	1	Enrico Brazzale	Italy	1:51.74	Q
16	5	Caleb Kwemoi	Uganda	1:51.82	Q
17	4	Enrico Riccobon	Italy	1:51.84	Q
18	5	Filip Šnejdr	Czech Republic	1:51.85	Q
19	3	Rafael Muñoz	Chile	1:52.04	q
20	5	Duran Faro	South Africa	1:52.09	Q
21	5	James Preston	New Zealand	1:52.20	Q
22	2	Mohammed Al-Suleimani	Oman	1:52.27	q, SB
23	2	Michael Todd	United States	1:52.43	q
24	5	Sami Al-Yami	Saudi Arabia	1:52.45	PB
25	3	Nifras Rojideen	Sri Lanka	1:52.49	PB
26	1	Diogo Pinhão	Portugal	1:52.70	
27	5	Julian Alberto Gaviola	Argentina	1:52.75	
28	3	Peter Al-Khoury	Lebanon	1:52.83	
29	5	Tilen Šimenko Lalič	Slovenia	1:52.85	
30	1	Nicolae Marian Coman	Romania	1:52.95	
31	4	Dage Minors	Bermuda	1:53.44	Q
32	4	Sten Ütsmüts	Estonia	1:54.09	
33	4	Hristiyan Stoyanov	Bulgaria	1:54.22	PB
34	1	Francs Dāvids Helvijs	Latvia	2:01.06	SB
35	3	Bandar Hassan	Saudi Arabia	2:20.38	
	5	Tariku Mekonen	Ethiopia	DNF	
	4	Patrick Kahongo	Zambia	DNF	

=== Semifinals ===
Qualification: First 2 in each heat (Q) and next 2 fastest (q) qualified for the final.

Rank	Heat	Name	Nationality	Time	Notes
1	2	Moad Zahafi	Morocco	1:47.63	Q
2	3	Mohamed Belbachir	Algeria	1:47.86	Q
3	2	Aymeric Lusine	France	1:48.02	Q
4	3	Filip Šnejdr	Czech Republic	1:48.11	Q, SB
5	2	Li Junlin	China	1:48.14	q
6	2	James Preston	New Zealand	1:48.68	q
7	2	Bram Buigel	Netherlands	1:48.90	PB
8	2	Gorata Gabankitse	Botswana	1:49.00	SB
9	3	Caleb Kwemoi	Uganda	1:49.28	
10	3	Jye Perrott	Australia	1:49.49	
11	2	Christian Clausen	Denmark	1:49.50	PB
12	1	Enrico Riccobon	Italy	1:49.54	Q
13	1	Lukáš Hodboď	Czech Republic	1:49.76	Q
14	1	Oussama Cherrad	Algeria	1:49.76	
15	1	Mason Cohen	Australia	1:49.98	
16	3	Enrico Brazzale	Italy	1:50.27	
17	1	Duran Faro	South Africa	1:50.53	
18	1	Emmanuel Osuje	Uganda	1:50.90	
19	2	Matheus Americo	Brazil	1:50.95	
20	1	Jirayu Pleenaram	Thailand	1:51.17	PB
21	3	Michael Todd	United States	1:51.25	
22	3	Dage Minors	Bermuda	1:51.43	
23	1	Rafael Muñoz	Chile	1:53.30	
	3	Mohammed Al-Suleimani	Oman	DNS	

=== Final ===
Rank	Name	Nationality	Time	Notes
1st place, gold medalist(s)	Mohamed Belbachir	Algeria	1:47.02	
2nd place, silver medalist(s)	Moad Zahafi	Morocco	1:47.64	
3rd place, bronze medalist(s)	Lukáš Hodboď	Czech Republic	1:47.97	SB
4	Filip Šnejdr	Czech Republic	1:48.08	SB
5	Enrico Riccobon	Italy	1:48.58	SB
6	James Preston	New Zealand	1:50.11	
	Li Junlin	China	DQ	R163.3a
	Aymeric Lusine	France	DQ	R163.3a
