= 2022 European Athletics Championships – Men's 800 metres =

Men's 800 metres at the 2022 European Athletics Championships
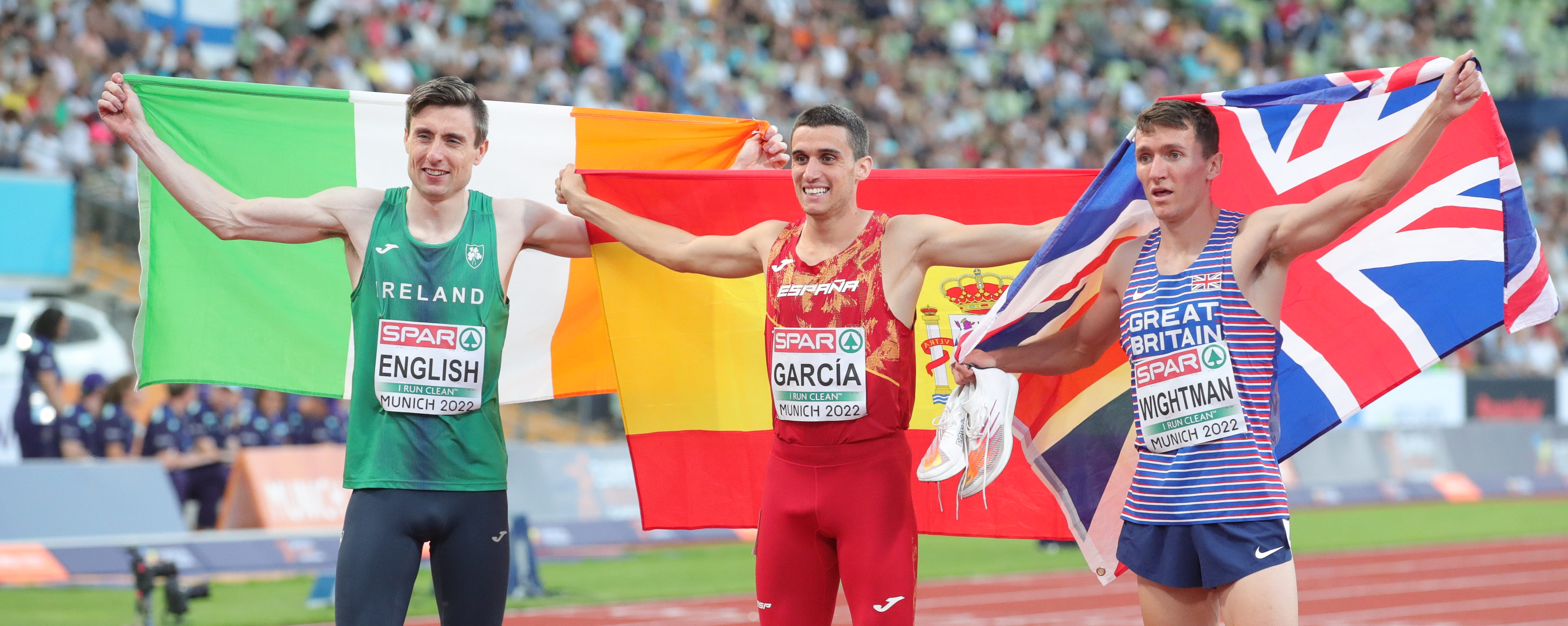
- Venue: Olympiastadion
- Location: Munich
- Dates: 18 August (round 1); 19 August (semifinals); 21 August (final)
- Competitors: 31 from 16 nations
- Winning time: 1:44.85

Medalists
gold medal	Mariano García	Spain
silver medal	Jake Wightman	Great Britain
bronze medal	Mark English	Ireland

The men's 800 metres at the 2022 European Athletics Championships took place at the Olympiastadion on 18, 19 and 21 August.

== Records ==
Standing records prior to the 2022 European Athletics Championships
World record	David Rudisha (KEN)	1:40.91	London, Great Britain	9 August 2012
European record	Wilson Kipketer (DEN)	1:41.11	Köln, Germany	24 August 1997
Championship record	Olaf Beyer (GDR)	1:43.84	Prague, Czechoslovakia	31 August 1978
World Leading	Max Burgin (GBR)	1:43.52	Turku, Finland	14 June 2022
Europe Leading	Max Burgin (GBR)	1:43.52	Turku, Finland	14 June 2022

== Schedule ==
Date	Time	Round
18 August 2022	10:10	Round 1
19 August 2022	20:27	Semifinals
21 August 2022	19:40	Final

All times are local times (UTC+2)

== Results ==
=== Round 1 ===
First 3 in each heat (Q) and the next 4 fastest (q) advance to the Semifinals.

Rank	Heat	Lane	Name	Nationality	Time	Note
1	1	1	Jake Wightman	Great Britain	1:45.94	Q, SB
2	1	8	Simone Barontini	Italy	1:45.98	Q
3	1	5	Gabriel Tual	France	1:46.08	Q
4	1	2	Tibo De Smet	Belgium	1:46.48	q
5	1	7	Andreas Kramer	Sweden	1:46.50	q
6	1	3	Dániel Huller	Hungary	1:47.19	q
7	1	6	Abedin Mujezinović	Bosnia and Herzegovina	1:47.29	q
8	4	4	Eliott Crestan	Belgium	1:47.41	Q
9	3	4	Patryk Dobek	Poland	1:47.49	Q
10	2	3	Mark English	Ireland	1:47.54	Q
11	4	7	Adrián Ben	Spain	1:47.64	Q
12	3	8	Ben Pattison	Great Britain	1:47.64	Q
13	3	1	Mariano García	Spain	1:47.66	Q
14	2	4	Benjamin Robert	France	1:47.66	Q
15	2	7	Daniel Rowden	Great Britain	1:47.67	Q
16	4	3	Tony van Diepen	Netherlands	1:47.67	Q
17	1	4	Christoph Kessler	Germany	1:47.72	
18	2	6	Amel Tuka	Bosnia and Herzegovina	1:47.73	
19	4	8	Mateusz Borkowski	Poland	1:47.74	
20	4	6	Yanis Meziane	France	1:47.82	
21	4	2	Catalin Tecuceanu	Italy	1:47.94	
22	2	5	Álvaro de Arriba	Spain	1:47.94	
23	3	6	Djoao Lobles	Netherlands	1:48.00	
24	3	3	Joonas Rinne	Finland	1:48.03	
25	3	2	Filip Šnejdr	Czech Republic	1:48.16	
26	3	5	John Fitzsimons	Ireland	1:48.22	
27	4	5	Tobias Grønstad	Norway	1:48.28	
28	2	8	Marc Reuther	Germany	1:48.33	
29	2	1	Kacper Lewalski	Poland	1:48.43	
30	3	7	Aurele Vandeputte	Belgium	1:48.46	
31	2	2	Jan Vukovič	Slovenia	1:48.88	

=== Semifinals ===
First 3 in each semifinal (Q) and the next 2 fastest (q) advance to the final.

Rank	Heat	Lane	Name	Nationality	Time	Note
1	2	8	Mariano García	Spain	1:46.52	Q
2	2	1	Jake Wightman	Great Britain	1:46.61	Q
3	2	6	Mark English	Ireland	1:46.66	Q
4	2	3	Ben Pattison	Great Britain	1:46.95	q
5	2	2	Eliott Crestan	Belgium	1:47.13	q
6	2	5	Tony van Diepen	Netherlands	1:47.64	
7	2	4	Gabriel Tual	France	1:47.70	
8	2	7	Dániel Huller	Hungary	1:48.03	
9	1	4	Andreas Kramer	Sweden	1:48.37	Q
10	1	2	Simone Barontini	Italy	1:48.51	Q
11	1	3	Benjamin Robert	France	1:48.51	Q
12	1	5	Patryk Dobek	Poland	1:48.63	
13	1	8	Daniel Rowden	Great Britain	1:48.80	
14	1	6	Tibo De Smet	Belgium	1:49.10	
15	1	7	Adrián Ben	Spain	1:49.26	
16	1	1	Abedin Mujezinović	Bosnia and Herzegovina	1:50.20	

=== Final ===
Rank	Lane	Name	Nationality	Time	Note
1st place, gold medalist(s)	7	Mariano García	Spain	1:44.85	PB
2nd place, silver medalist(s)	2	Jake Wightman	Great Britain	1:44.91	SB
3rd place, bronze medalist(s)	3	Mark English	Ireland	1:45.19	
4	5	Andreas Kramer	Sweden	1:45.38	
5	6	Benjamin Robert	France	1:45.42	
6	4	Ben Pattison	Great Britain	1:45.63	
7	8	Simone Barontini	Italy	1:45.66	PB
8	1	Eliott Crestan	Belgium	1:45.68	SB
