= Filip Šnejdr =

Czech middle-distance runner

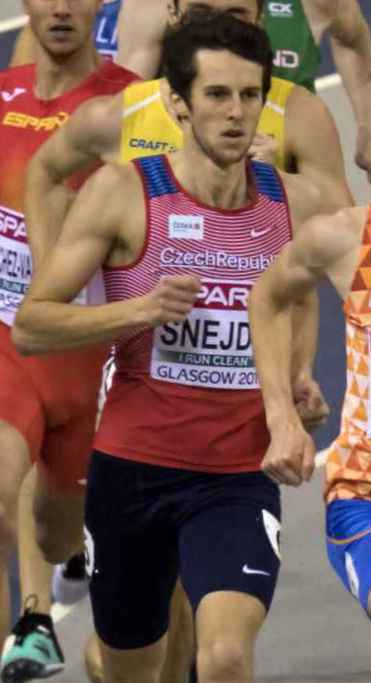
- Filip Šnejdr in 2019

Personal information
- Born: 16 April 1995 (age 31)

Sport
- Sport: Athletics
- Event: 800 metres
- Club: TJ Sokol Hradec Králové
- Coached by: Hakim Saleh
Medal record
Men's athletics
Representing Czech Republic
European Games
Silver medal – second place	2023 Kraków-Małopolska	800 m

Filip Šnejdr (born 16 April 1995) is a Czech middle-distance runner specialising in the 800 metres. He represented his country in the 4 × 400 metres relay at the 2018 World Indoor Championships finishing fifth. He earlier won a bronze medal in the same event at the 2017 Summer Universiade.

== International competitions ==
Year	Competition	Venue	Position	Event	Notes
Representing the Czech Republic
2017	European U23 Championships	Bydgoszcz, Poland	5th	800 m	1:49.19
2017	Universiade	Taipei, Taiwan	7th	800 m	1:48.31
2017	Universiade	Taipei, Taiwan	3rd	4 × 400 m relay	3:08.14
2018	World Indoor Championships	Birmingham, United Kingdom	5th	4 × 400 m relay	3:04.87
2018	European Championships	Berlin, Germany	26th (h)	800 m	1:48.70
2018	European Championships	Berlin, Germany	7th	4 × 400 m relay	3:03.00
2019	European Indoor Championships	Glasgow, United Kingdom	10th (sf)	800 m	1:50.72
2019	Universiade	Naples, Italy	4th	800 m	1:48.08
2019	Universiade	Naples, Italy	5th	4 × 400 m relay	3:06.78
2021	European Indoor Championships	Toruń, Poland	8th (h)	800 m	1:48.87
2022	World Indoor Championships	Belgrade, Serbia	16th (h)	800 m	1:49.29
2022	European Championships	Munich, Germany	25th (h)	800 m	1:48.16
2023	European Indoor Championships	Istanbul, Turkey	12th (h)	800 m	1:48.35
2024	World Indoor Championships	Glasgow, United Kingdom	22nd (h)	800 m	1:48.30

== Personal bests ==
Outdoor

- 60 metres – 7.26 (Bilina 2018)
- 100 metres – 11.34 (Bilina 2018)
- 150 metres – 16.75 (Prague 2020)
- 200 metres – 22.46 (Bilina 2018)
- 300 metres – 34.52 (Prague 2020)
- 400 metres – 46.69 (Prague 2018)
- 500 metres – 1:01.99 (Prague 2020)
- 600 metres – 1:16.53 (Pliezhausen 2023)
- 800 metres – 1:45.56 (Tomblaine 2018)
- 1000 metres – 2:20.23 (Šamorín 2019)
- 1500 metres – 3:58.07 (Prague 2022)

Indoor

- 60 metres – 7.42 (Prague 2015)
- 200 metres – 21.92 (Prague 2018)
- 300 metres – 34.43 (Prague 2018)
- 400 metres – 47.05 (Prague 2018)
- 500 metres – 1:01.98 (Prague 2020)
- 600 metres – 1:16.87 (Prague 2021)
- 800 metres – 1:46.63 (Ostrava 2021)
- 1000 metres – 2:19.98 (Prague 2021)
