= Daniel Rowden =

English middle-distance runner

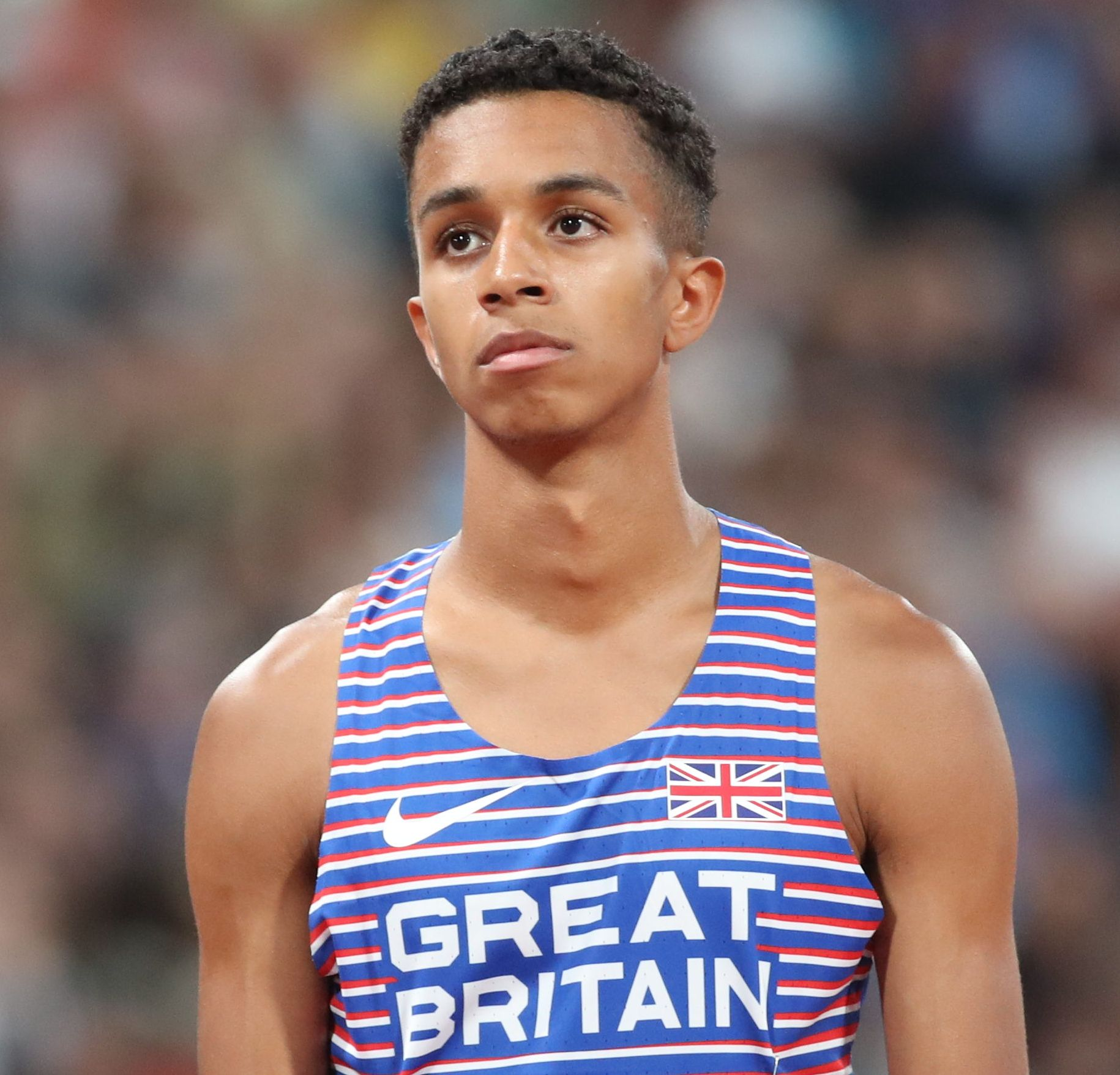
- Rowden in Munich 2022

Personal information
- Born: 9 September 1997 (age 28) Buckhurst Hill, Greater London, England
- Education: Imperial College London

Sport
- Sport: Athletics
- Event: 800 metres
- Club: Woodford Green with Essex Ladies
- Coached by: John Stow (–2017); Richard Thurston (2017–2019)

Daniel Kwabena Rowden (born 9 September 1997) is an English middle-distance runner specialising in the 800 metres, who competed at the 2020 Summer Olympics.

== Biography ==
Rowden is of Ghanaian descent through his mother. and won a silver medal at the 2017 European U23 Championships.

He became British champion when winning the 800 metres event at the 2020 British Athletics Championships in a time of 1 min 45.94 secs. At the delayed 2020 Olympic Games in Tokyo, he represented Great Britain

He won a second British title at the 2023 British Athletics Championships.

== International competitions ==
Year	Competition	Venue	Position	Event	Notes
Representing Great Britain
2015	European Junior Championships	Eskilstuna, Sweden	14th (sf)	800 m	1:52.31
2016	World U20 Championships	Bydgoszcz, Poland	20th (sf)	800 m	1:49.58
2017	European U23 Championships	Bydgoszcz, Poland	2nd	800 m	1:48.16
2018	European Championships	Berlin, Germany	12th (sf)	800 m	1:46.98
2021	Olympic Games	Tokyo, Japan	6th (sf)	800 m	1:44.35
2022	World Championships	Eugene, United States	14th (sf)	800 m	1:46.27
2022	European Championships	Munich, Germany	13th (sf)	800 m	1:48.80
2023	World Championships	Budapest, Hungary	21st (sf)	800 m	1:45.38

== Personal bests ==
Outdoor

- 400 metres – 48.48 (Lee Valley 2015)
- 800 metres – 1:43.95 (Monaco 2023)
- 1500 metres – 3:54.65 (Watford 2017)
