= Mohamed Belbachir =

Algerian middle-distance runner

Personal information
- Born: 11 January 1994 (age 32)
- Education: University of Algiers 2
- Height: 1.76 m (5 ft 9 in)
- Weight: 66 kg (146 lb)

Sport
- Sport: Athletics
- Event: 800 metres
Medal record
Men's athletics
Representing Algeria
Gold medal – first place	2019 Naples	800 m
Silver medal – second place	2017 Taipei	800 m

Mohamed Belbachir (born 11 January 1994) is an Algerian middle-distance runner specialising in the 800 metres. He won the silver medal at the 2017 Summer Universiade.

== International competitions ==
Year	Competition	Venue	Position	Event	Notes
Representing Algeria
2011	World Youth Championships	Lille, France	34th (h)	800 m	1:54.58
2011	World Youth Championships	Lille, France	24th (h)	Medley relay	1:59.89
2012	World Junior Championships	Barcelona, Spain	7th	800 m	1:46.70
2013	African Junior Championships	Bambous, Mauritius	3rd	400 m	47.40
2013	African Junior Championships	Bambous, Mauritius	11th (h)	800 m	1:53.5
2013	Islamic Solidarity Games	Palembang, Indonesia	3rd	4 × 400 m relay	3:09.04
2017	Arab Championships	Radès, Tunisia	2nd	800 m	1:47.57
2017	Universiade	Taipei, Taiwan	2nd	800 m	1:46.73
2018	Mediterranean Games	Tarragona, Spain	6th	800 m	1:49.41
2018	Mediterranean Games	Tarragona, Spain	3rd	4 × 400 m relay	3:04.71
2018	African Championships	Asaba, Nigeria	16th (h)	800 m	1:48.71
2019	Universiade	Naples, Italy	1st	800 m	1:47.02
2019	African Games	Rabat, Morocco	7th	800 m	1:46.10
2019	World Championships	Doha, Qatar	25th (h)	800 m	1:46.52

== Personal bests ==
Outdoor

- 400 metres – 47.20 (Algiers 2016)
- 600 metres – 1:16.74 (Biskra 2015)
- 800 metres – 1:45.36 (Conegliano, Italy June, 2021)
