= Athletics at the 2017 Summer Universiade – Men's 800 metres =

800 metre race

The men's 800 metres event at the 2017 Summer Universiade was held on 26, 27 and 28 August at the Taipei Municipal Stadium.

== Medalists ==
Gold	Silver	Bronze
Jesús Tonatiu López; Mexico	Mohamed Belbachir; Algeria	Aymeric Lusine; France

== Results ==
=== Heats ===
Qualification: First 3 in each heat (Q) and next 3 fastest (q) qualified for the semifinals.

Rank	Heat	Name	Nationality	Time	Notes
1	1	James Bowness	Great Britain	1:50.49	Q
1	5	Baptiste Mischler	France	1:50.49	Q
3	5	Benediktas Mickus	Lithuania	1:50.57	Q
4	5	Christoph Kessler	Germany	1:50.63	Q
5	1	Elmar Engholm	Sweden	1:50.66	Q, SB
6	1	Ievgen Gutsol	Ukraine	1:50.88	Q
7	3	Soufiane El Kabbouri	Italy	1:51.06	Q
8	4	Jesús Tonatiu López	Mexico	1:51.07	Q
9	6	Michał Rozmys	Poland	1:51.08	Q
10	4	Mohamed Belbachir	Algeria	1:51.16	Q
11	3	Levent Ateş	Turkey	1:51.17	Q
11	5	Lukáš Hodboď	Czech Republic	1:51.17	q
13	3	Hendrik Uys	South Africa	1:51.18	Q
14	3	Shaquille Dill	Bermuda	1:51.20	q
15	6	Cleiton Abrão	Brazil	1:51.18	Q
16	1	Ramzi Abdenouz	Algeria	1:51.26	q
17	1	Amoj Jacob	India	1:51.28	
18	4	Filip Šnejdr	Czech Republic	1:51.40	Q
19	1	Dage Minors	Bermuda	1:51.43	
20	6	Kelvin Kitur	Kenya	1:51.47	Q
21	4	Li Junlin	China	1:51.77	
22	5	Imanmadi Kusmanov	Kazakhstan	1:51.89	PB
23	3	Fortunate Turihohabwe	Uganda	1:51.92	PB
24	1	Pauls Ārents	Latvia	1:52.03	SB
25	2	Tyler Smith	Canada	1:52.25	Q
26	6	Mindaugas Striokas	Lithuania	1:52.27	
27	7	Aaron Botterman	Belgium	1:52.38	Q
28	7	Aymeric Lusine	France	1:52.44	Q
29	7	Artur Kuciapski	Poland	1:52.44	Q
30	3	Umar Sadat	Pakistan	1:52.46	
31	2	Stephen Knuckey	Australia	1:52.47	Q
32	7	Christos Dimitriou	Cyprus	1:52.53	
33	6	Drevan Anderson-Kaapa	United States	1:52.76	SB
34	6	Christian Sand Clausen	Denmark	1:53.39	
35	4	Pedro da Palma Junior	Brazil	1:53.75	
36	7	Frederik Fürstenberg	Denmark	1:54.28	
37	5	Malvin Nikolla	Albania	1:54.36	PB
38	2	Rynardt van Rensburg	South Africa	1:55.00	Q
39	4	Marcel Ngabonziza	Rwanda	1:55.84	
40	4	Ahmed Ali Al-Aamri	Oman	1:55.89	SB
41	6	Timothy Ongom	Uganda	1:55.90	
42	7	Josué Murcia	Costa Rica	1:56.06	
43	7	Zhou Guangcai	China	1:56.63	
44	2	Cristofer Jarpa	Chile	1:56.73	
45	4	Charuka Kushant Ganhewayalage	Sri Lanka	1:56.84	SB
46	2	Óscar Romero	Colombia	1:58.40	
47	3	Abdo El Helou	Lebanon	1:59.24	
48	5	Hussein Khalife	Lebanon	1:59.62	
49	3	Khalid Al-Muyidi	Saudi Arabia	1:59.88	
50	5	Mazen Masrahi	Saudi Arabia	2:01.56	
51	2	Said Badur Al-Rahbi	Oman	2:02.20	
	2	Mohammed Shafic Ali	Ghana	DNS	
	2	Charles Grethen	Luxembourg	DNS	

=== Semifinals ===
Qualification: First 2 in each heat (Q) and the next 2 fastest (q) qualified for the final.

Rank	Heat	Name	Nationality	Time	Notes
1	1	Aymeric Lusine	France	1:48.04	Q
2	3	Jesús Tonatiu López	Mexico	1:48.23	Q
3	3	Mohamed Belbachir	Algeria	1:48.30	Q
4	1	Artur Kuciapski	Poland	1:48.36	Q
5	1	Stephen Knuckey	Australia	1:48.39	q
6	1	Hendrik Uys	South Africa	1:48.66	q
7	3	Michał Rozmys	Poland	1:48.71	
8	3	James Bowness	Great Britain	1:48.78	
9	2	Rynardt van Rensburg	South Africa	1:48.97	Q
10	3	Elmar Engholm	Sweden	1:49.03	PB
11	2	Filip Šnejdr	Czech Republic	1:49.04	Q
12	2	Baptiste Mischler	France	1:49.07	
13	2	Levent Ateş	Turkey	1:49.31	
14	1	Benediktas Mickus	Lithuania	1:49.35	
15	1	Lukáš Hodboď	Czech Republic	1:49.40	
16	3	Aaron Botterman	Belgium	1:49.45	
17	2	Ramzi Abdenouz	Algeria	1:49.94	
18	2	Ievgen Gutsol	Ukraine	1:49.97	
19	3	Christoph Kessler	Germany	1:50.13	
20	2	Soufiane El Kabbouri	Italy	1:50.45	
21	1	Tyler Smith	Canada	1:50.90	
22	1	Kelvin Kitur	Kenya	1:51.93	
23	2	Cleiton Abrão	Brazil	1:54.16	
24	3	Shaquille Dill	Bermuda	1:54.70	

=== Final ===
Official Video

Rank	Name	Nationality	Time	Notes
1st place, gold medalist(s)	Jesús Tonatiu López	Mexico	1:46.06	
2nd place, silver medalist(s)	Mohamed Belbachir	Algeria	1:46.73	
3rd place, bronze medalist(s)	Aymeric Lusine	France	1:47.18	
4	Hendrik Uys	South Africa	1:47.59	
5	Artur Kuciapski	Poland	1:47.69	
6	Stephen Knuckey	Australia	1:47.90	
7	Filip Šnejdr	Czech Republic	1:48.31	
8	Rynardt van Rensburg	South Africa	1:49.70	
