= 2018 European Athletics Championships – Men's 800 metres =

Men's 800 metres at the 2018 European Athletics Championships
- Venue: Olympic Stadium
- Location: Berlin
- Dates: August 9 (round 1); August 10 (semifinals); August 11 (final)
- Competitors: 33 from 21 nations
- Winning time: 1:44.59

Medalists
gold medal	Adam Kszczot	Poland
silver medal	Andreas Kramer	Sweden
bronze medal	Pierre-Ambroise Bosse	France

The men's 800 metres at the 2018 European Athletics Championships took place at the Olympic Stadium on 9, 10, and 11 August.

== Records ==
Standing records prior to the 2018 European Athletics Championships
World record	David Rudisha (KEN)	1:40.91	London, Great Britain	9 August 2012
European record	Wilson Kipketer (DEN)	1:41.11	Cologne, Germany	24 August 1997
Championship record	Olaf Beyer (GDR)	1:43.84	Prague, Czechoslovakia	31 August 1978
World Leading	Emmanuel Korir (KEN)	1:42.05	London, Great Britain	22 July 2018
European Leading	Saúl Ordóñez (ESP)	1:43.65	Monaco	20 July 2018

== Schedule ==
Date	Time	Round
9 August 2018	11:30	Round 1
10 August 2018	19:32	Semifinals
11 August 2018	20:30	Final

All times are local times (UTC+2)

== Results ==
=== Round 1 ===
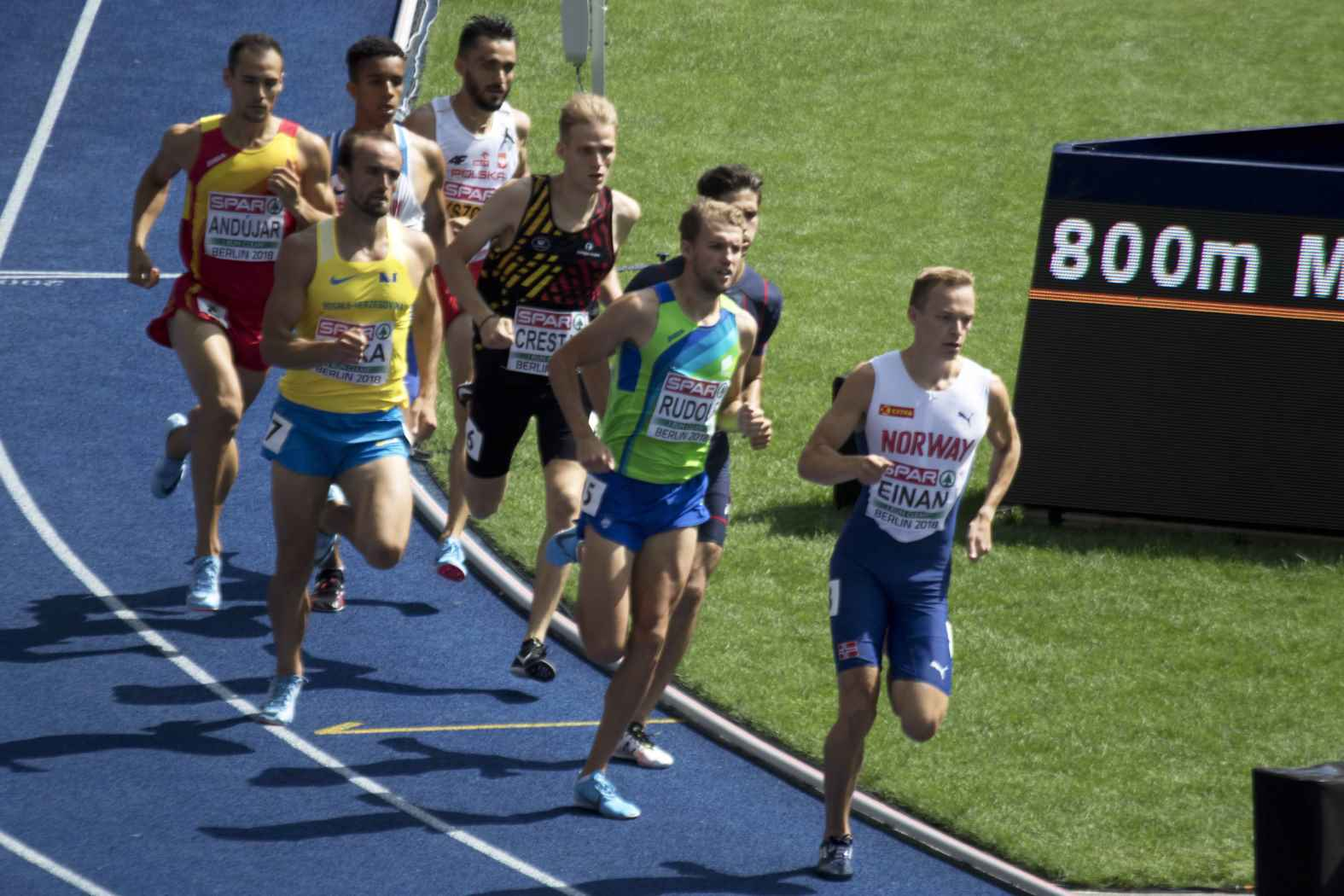
Heat 4

First 3 in each heat (Q) and the next fastest 4 (q) advanced to the Semifinals.

Rank	Heat	Lane	Name	Nationality	Time	Note
1	4	1	Adam Kszczot	Poland	1:46.31	Q
2	2	2	Mateusz Borkowski	Poland	1:46.41	Q
3	4	7	Amel Tuka	Bosnia and Herzegovina	1:46.47	Q
4	2	8	Álvaro de Arriba	Spain	1:46.48	Q
5	2	3	Lukáš Hodboď	Czech Republic	1:46.50	Q, PB
6	4	4	Daniel Rowden	Great Britain	1:46.59	Q
7	2	4	Thomas Roth	Norway	1:46.70	q
8	2	6	Guy Learmonth	Great Britain	1:46.75	q
9	2	5	Yevhen Hutsol	Ukraine	1:46.97	q
10	4	8	Daniel Andújar	Spain	1:46.99	q
11	4	2	Gabriel Tual	France	1:47.26	
12	4	6	Elliott Crestan	Belgium	1:47.35	
13	2	1	Sven Cepuš	Croatia	1:47.56	
14	3	3	Andreas Kramer	Sweden	1:47.87	Q
15	3	1	Andreas Bube	Denmark	1:47.94	Q
16	1	3	Saúl Ordóñez	Spain	1:47.95	Q
17	1	5	Michał Rozmys	Poland	1:48.01	Q
18	1	1	Elliot Giles	Great Britain	1:48.05	Q
19	2	7	Christoph Kessler	Germany	1:48.13	
20	3	7	Pierre-Ambroise Bosse	France	1:48.14	Q
21	4	5	Žan Rudolf	Slovenia	1:48.24	
22	3	4	Benedikt Huber	Germany	1:48.33	
23	1	8	Tamás Kazi	Hungary	1:48.37	
24	3	8	Simone Barontini	Italy	1:48.53	
25	4	3	Markus Einan	Norway	1:48.55	
26	3	5	Filip Šnejdr	Czech Republic	1:48.70	
27	1	4	Cosmin Trofin	Romania	1:48.85	
28	1	7	Mark English	Ireland	1:48.98	SB
29	3	2	Zak Curran	Ireland	1:49.31	
30	3	6	Musa Hajdari	Kosovo	1:49.47	
31	1	2	Christos Demetriou	Cyprus	1:50.62	
	1	6	Abedin Mujezinović	Bosnia and Herzegovina	DQ	163.2 (b)
	1	8	Marc Reuther	Germany	DQ	163.2 (b)

=== Semifinals ===
First 3 (Q) and next 2 fastest (q) qualify for the final.

Rank	Heat	Lane	Name	Nationality	Time	Note
1	2	4	Adam Kszczot	Poland	1:46.11	Q
2	1	5	Andreas Kramer	Sweden	1:46.14	Q
3	2	8	Michał Rozmys	Poland	1:46.17	Q, SB
4	2	6	Pierre-Ambroise Bosse	France	1:46.21	Q
5	1	1	Andreas Bube	Denmark	1:46.40	Q
6	2	3	Álvaro de Arriba	Spain	1:46.43	q
7	1	8	Mateusz Borkowski	Poland	1:46.54	Q
8	2	2	Lukáš Hodboď	Czech Republic	1:46.57	q
9	2	7	Thomas Roth	Norway	1:46.60	
10	1	4	Saúl Ordóñez	Spain	1:46.82	
11	1	3	Guy Learmonth	Great Britain	1:46.83	
12	1	6	Daniel Rowden	Great Britain	1:46.98	
13	1	7	Amel Tuka	Bosnia and Herzegovina	1:47.24	
14	1	2	Yevhen Hutsol	Ukraine	1:47.29	
15	2	5	Elliot Giles	Great Britain	1:47.40	
16	2	1	Daniel Andújar	Spain	1:48.10	

=== Final ===
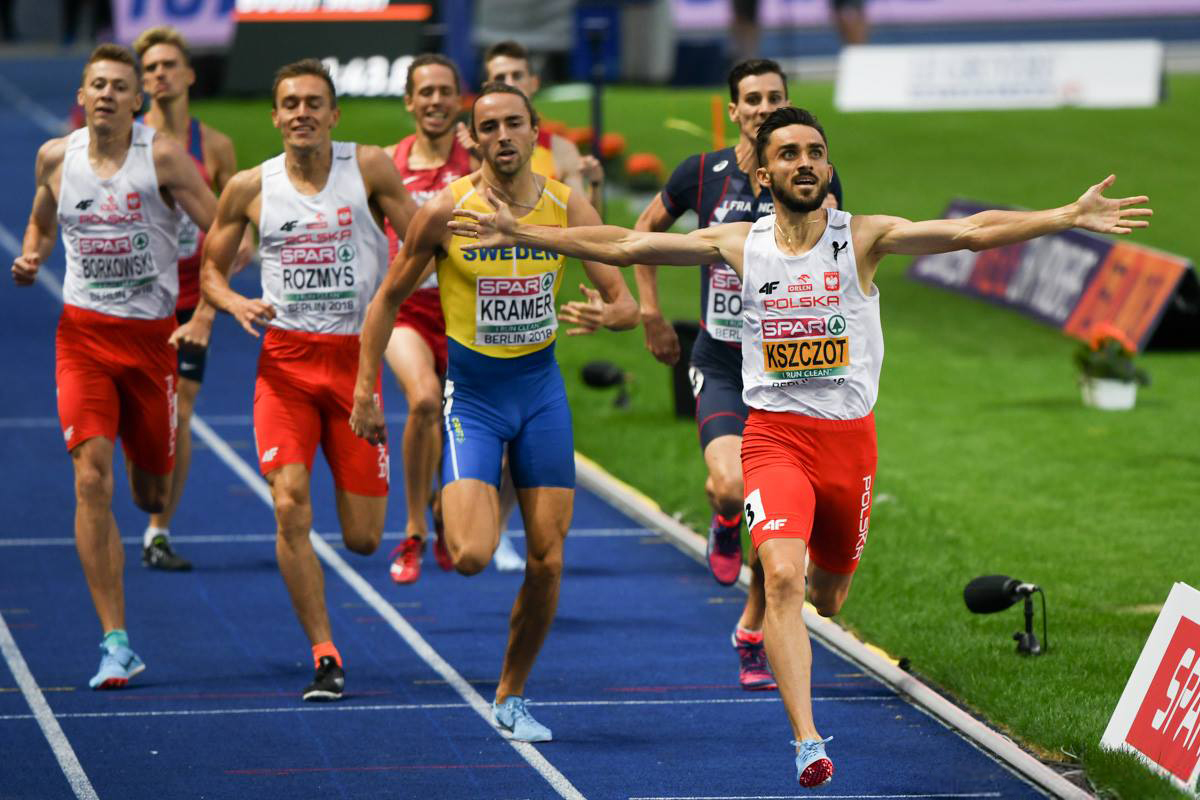
The final

Rank	Lane	Name	Nationality	Time	Note
1st place, gold medalist(s)	3	Adam Kszczot	Poland	1:44.59	SB
2nd place, silver medalist(s)	6	Andreas Kramer	Sweden	1:45.03	
3rd place, bronze medalist(s)	4	Pierre-Ambroise Bosse	France	1:45.30	
4	7	Michał Rozmys	Poland	1:45.32	PB
5	8	Mateusz Borkowski	Poland	1:45.42	PB
6	1	Andreas Bube	Denmark	1:45.92	SB
7	5	Álvaro de Arriba	Spain	1:46.41	
8	2	Lukáš Hodboď	Czech Republic	1:46.60	
