= Lukáš Hodboď =

Czech middle-distance runner

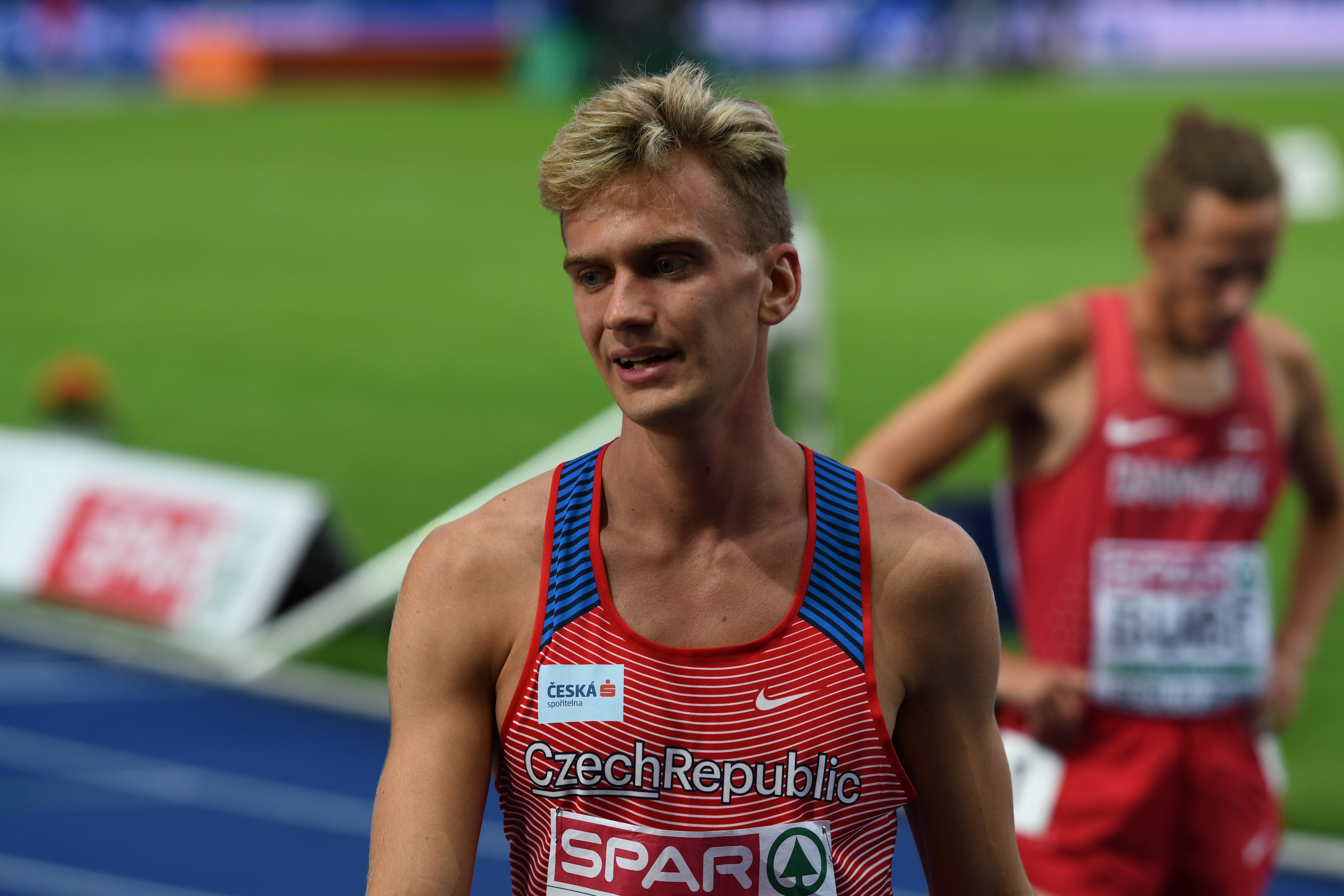
- Lukáš Hodboď in 2018

Personal information
- Born: 2 March 1996 (age 29) Nymburk, Czech Republic
- Education: University of Economics, Prague
- Height: 1.81 m (5 ft 11 in)

Sport
- Sport: Athletics
- Event: 800 metres
- Club: TJ Sokol Hradec Králové

Lukáš Hodboď (born 2 March 1996 in Nymburk) is a Czech middle-distance runner specialising in the 800 metres. He reached the final at the 2018 European Championships finishing eighth. On 2019 Summer Universiade he won a bronze medal.

His personal bests in the event are 1:45.74 outdoors (Chorzów 2021) and 1:46.74 indoors (Ostrava 2022). Earlier in his career he competed in the 400 metres hurdles.

== International competitions ==
Year	Competition	Venue	Position	Event	Notes
Representing the Czech Republic
2014	World Junior Championships	Eugene, United States	18th (sf)	400 m hurdles	52.75
2015	European Junior Championships	Eskilstuna, Sweden	26th (h)	400 m hurdles	54.72
2017	European U23 Championships	Bydgoszcz, Poland	17th (h)	800 m	1:50.72
2017	European U23 Championships	Bydgoszcz, Poland	10th (h)	4 × 400 m relay	3:10.34
2017	Universiade	Taipei, Taiwan	15th (sf)	800 m	1:49.40
2017	Universiade	Taipei, Taiwan	3rd	4 × 400 m relay	3:08.14
2018	European Championships	Berlin, Germany	8th	800 m	1:46.60
2019	European Indoor Championships	Glasgow, United Kingdom	17th (h)	800 m	1:49.31
2019	Universiade	Naples, Italy	3rd	800 m	1:47.97
2019	Universiade	Naples, Italy	5th	4 × 400 m relay	3:06.78
2021	European Indoor Championships	Toruń, Poland	34th (h)	800 m	1:51.59
