= Christoph Kessler =

German middle-distance runner

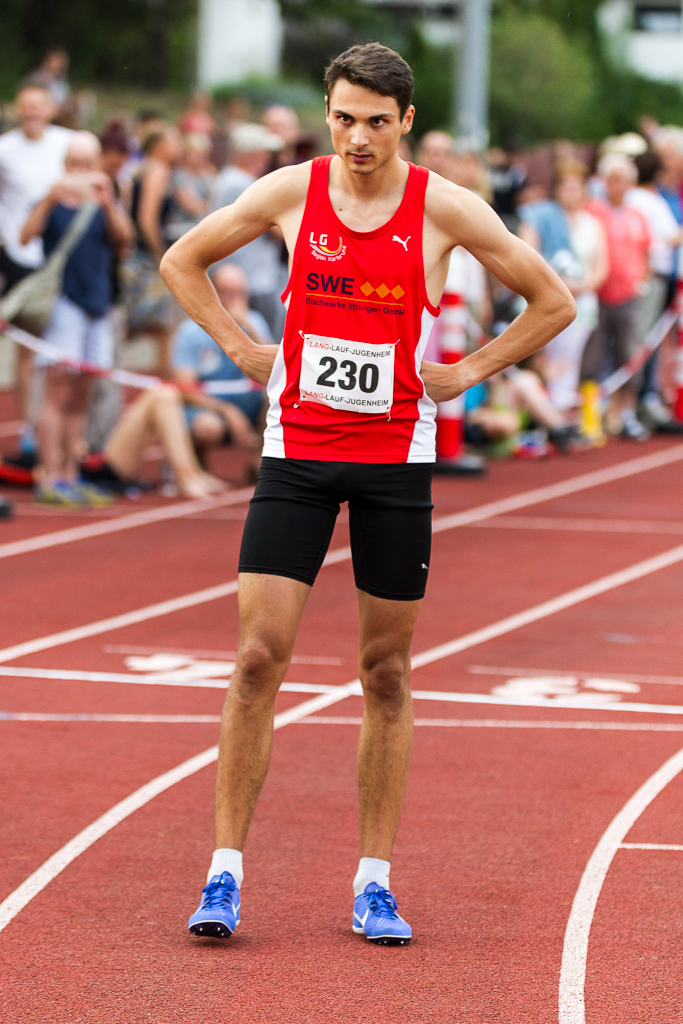
- Christoph Kessler in 2018

Personal information
- Nationality: German
- Born: 28 April 1995 (age 30) Donaueschingen, Germany
- Education: Karlsruhe Institute of Technology

Sport
- Sport: Athletics
- Event: 800 metres
- Club: LG Region Karlsruhe

Christoph Daniel Kessler (born 28 April 1995) is a German middle-distance runner specialising in the 800 metres. He represented his country at two indoor and one outdoor European Championships.

In 2019, he won the bronze medal in the team event at the 2019 European Games held in Minsk, Belarus.

== International competitions ==
| Year | Competition | Venue | Position | Event | Notes |
Representing Germany
| 2017 | European Indoor Championships | Belgrade, Serbia | 15th (h) | 800 m | 1:50.04 |
| 2017 | European U23 Championships | Bydgoszcz, Poland | 5th (h) | 800 m | 1:47.31 |
| 2017 | Universiade | Taipei, Taiwan | 19th (sf) | 800 m | 1:50.13 |
| 2018 | European Championships | Berlin, Germany | 19th (h) | 800 m | 1:48.13 |
| 2019 | European Indoor Championships | Glasgow, United Kingdom | 8th (sf) | 800 m | 1:50.62 |
| 2021 | European Indoor Championships | Toruń, Poland | 14th (sf) | 800 m | 1:49.46 |
| 2022 | World Championships | Eugene, United States | 19th (h) | 1500 m | 3:37.57 |
| 2022 | European Championships | Munich, Germany | 17th (h) | 800 m | 1:47.72 |
| 2022 | European Championships | Munich, Germany | 13th (h) | 1500 m | 3:39.32 |

== Personal bests ==
Outdoor

- 800 metres – 1:45.27 (Pfungstadt 2022)
- 1000 metres – 2:18.92 (Leipzig 2021)
- 1500 metres – 3:36.63 (Karlsruhe 2022)
- Mile – 4:01.72 (Lucerne 2020)

Indoor

- 800 metres – 1:47.14 (Karlsruhe 2021)
- 1500 metres – 3:38.46 (Dortmund 2022)
