= Jamie Webb =

British middle-distance runner

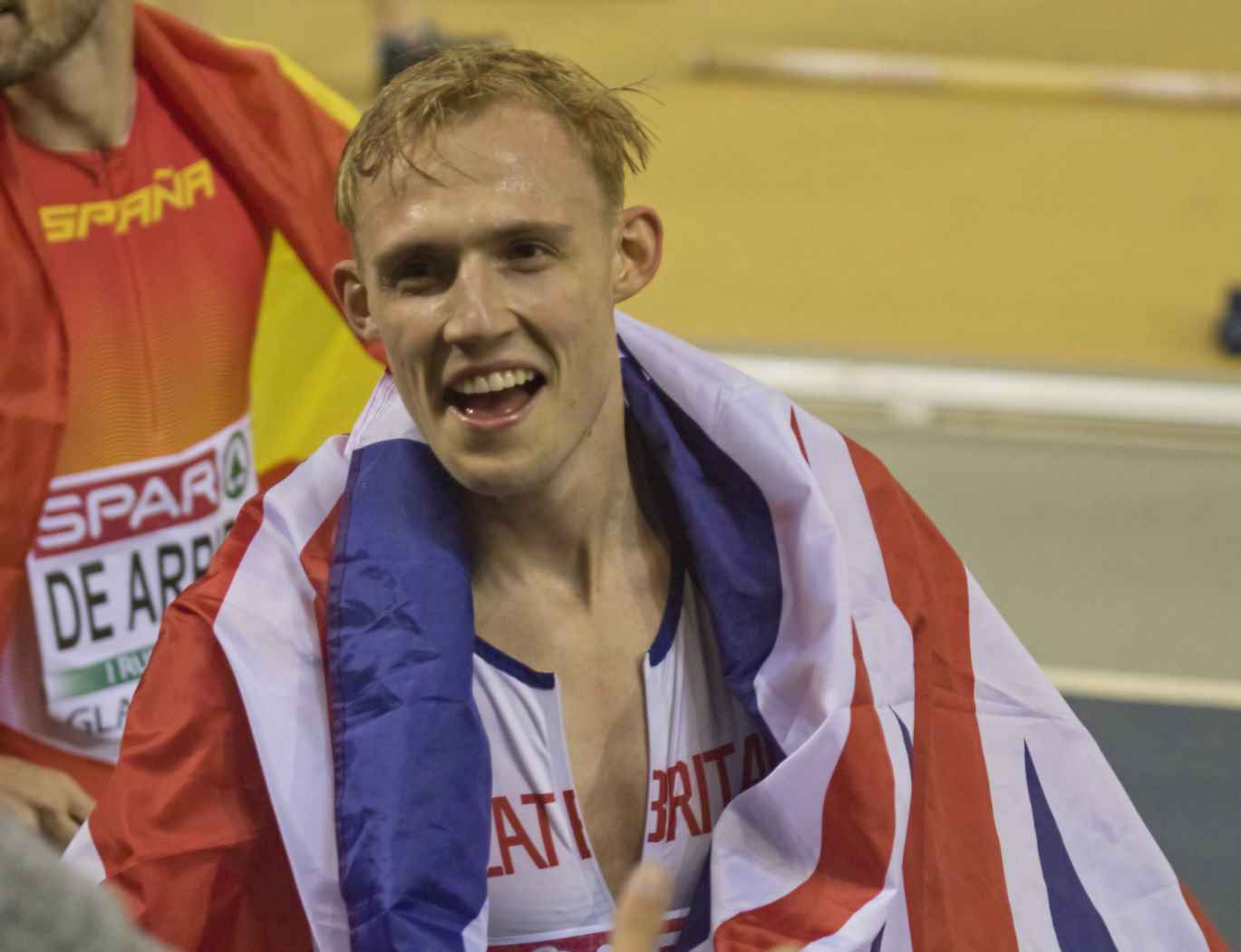
- Webb in 2019

Personal information
- Nationality: British (English)
- Born: 1 June 1994 (age 32) Liverpool, England

Sport
- Sport: Athletics
- Event: middle-distance
Medal record
Representing Great Britain
European Indoor Championships
Silver medal – second place	2019 Glasgow	800 m
Bronze medal – third place	2021 Toruń	800 m

Jamie Webb (born 1 June 1994) is a British athlete who specialises in the 800 metres.

== Biography ==
Webb won the silver medal at the 2019 European Athletics Indoor Championships in the 800 metres. He won a bronze medal at the same Championships in 2021 in Torún, Poland. His 800-metre best is 1:44.14.

Webb podiumed twice at the British Athletics Championships in 2016 and 2019.

Outside of athletics he studies a PhD in chemistry at Loughborough university having previously been a Chemistry teacher at the Harris Academy South Norwood, London.

Webb is currently a Chemistry teacher at Loughborough Grammar School.
