= Mateusz Borkowski =

Polish middle-distance runner

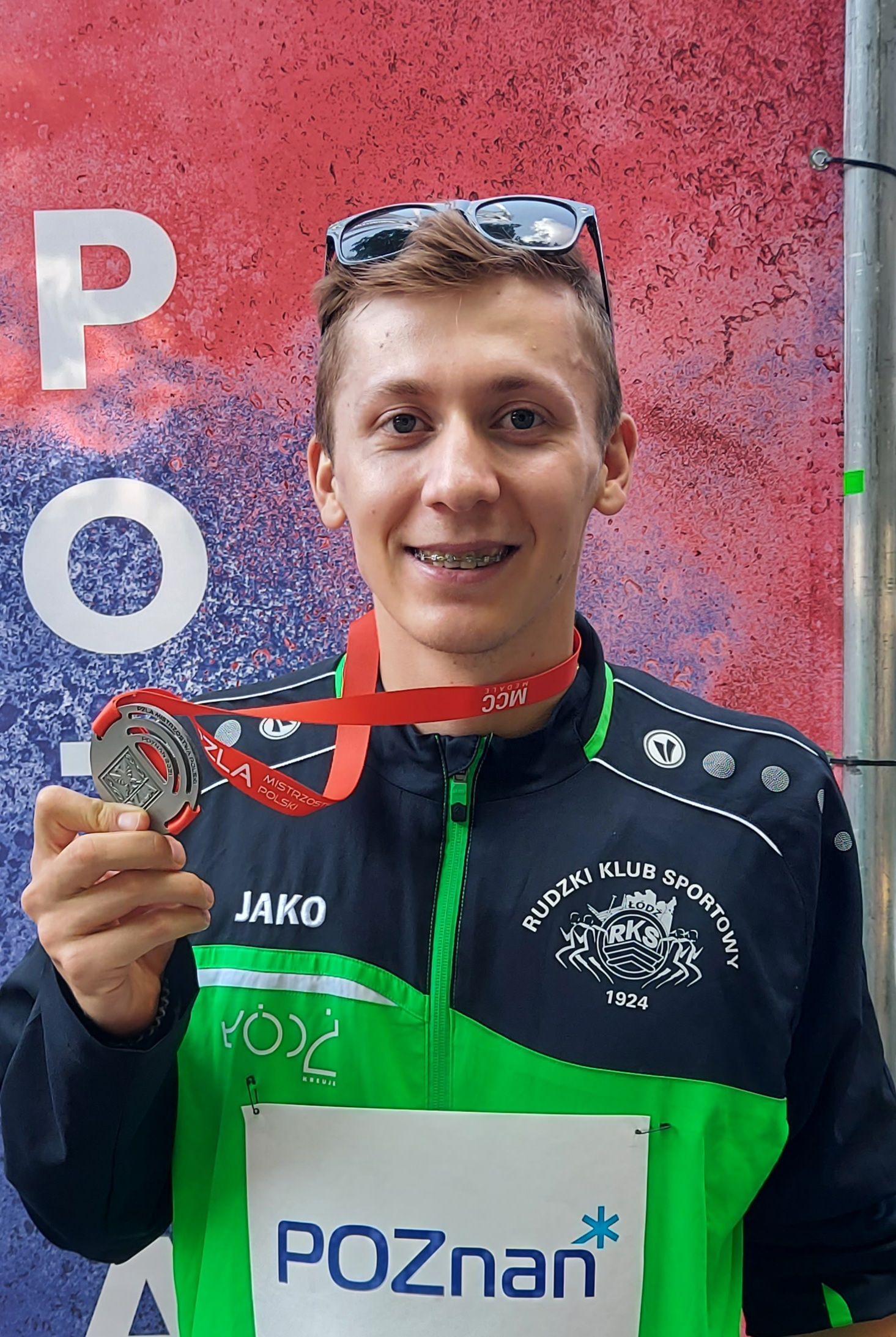
- Borkowski in 2021

Personal information
- Born: 2 April 1997 (age 29) Starachowice, Poland
- Education: Kazimierz Górski Higher School of Sports

Sport
- Sport: Athletics
- Event: 800 metres
- Club: LKB Rudnik (2011–2016); RKS Łódź (2016–)
- Coached by: Sylwester Dudek (-2016); Stanisław Jaszczak (2016–)
Medal record
Athletics
Representing Poland
European Indoor Championships
Silver medal – second place	2021 Toruń	800 m
European Team Championships
Bronze medal – third place	2021 Chorzów	800 m
European U23 Championships
Gold medal – first place	2019 Gävle	800 m
Polish Athletics Championships
Gold medal – first place	2019 Radom	800 m
Gold medal – first place	2020 Włocławek	4 × 400 m
Silver medal – second place	2018 Lublin	800 m
Silver medal – second place	2019 Radom	1500 m
Silver medal – second place	2021 Poznań	800 m
Silver medal – second place	2022 Suwałki	800 m
Bronze medal – third place	2020 Włocławek	800 m
Bronze medal – third place	2020 Włocławek	1500 m
Polish Indoor Athletics Championships
Gold medal – first place	2019 Toruń	800 m
Gold medal – first place	2020 Toruń	800 m
Silver medal – second place	2018 Toruń	800 m
Bronze medal – third place	2017 Toruń	800 m
Bronze medal – third place	2021 Toruń	800 m

Mateusz Borkowski (born 2 April 1997) is a Polish middle-distance runner competing primarily in the 800 metres. He won a bronze medal in 4 × 800 metres relay at the 2017 IAAF World Relays. Borkowski also competed for Poland at the 2020 and 2024 Summer Olympics.

== International competitions ==
Year	Competition	Venue	Position	Event	Notes
Representing Poland
2013	European Youth Olympic Festival	Utrecht, Netherlands	1st	3000 m	8:28.89
2014	Youth Olympic Games	Nanjing, China	13th	1500 m	3:55.58
2015	European Junior Championships	Eskilstuna, Sweden	3rd	800 m	1:49.21
2016	World U20 Championships	Bydgoszcz, Poland	22nd (h)	800 m	1:50.93
2017	European Indoor Championships	Belgrade, Serbia	16th (h)	800 m	1:50.08
2017	IAAF World Relays	Nassau, Bahamas	3rd	4 × 800 m relay	7:18.74
2017	European U23 Championships	Bydgoszcz, Poland	4th	800 m	1:48.92
2017	Universiade	Taipei, Taiwan	12th	1500 m	3:50.99
2018	European Championships	Berlin, Germany	5th	800 m	1:45.42
2019	European Indoor Championships	Glasgow, United Kingdom	11th (h)	800 m	1:48.82
2019	European U23 Championships	Gävle, Sweden	1st	800 m	1:48.75
2021	European Indoor Championships	Toruń, Poland	2nd	800m	1:46.90
2021	Olympic Games	Tokyo, Japan	18th (sf)	800 m	1:46.54
2022	World Championships	Eugene, United States	30th (h)	800 m	1:47.61
2022	European Championships	Munich, Germany	19th (h)	800 m	1:47.74
2023	European Indoor Championships	Istanbul, Turkey	9th (sf)	800 m	1:47.55
2023	World Championships	Budapest, Hungary	8th (sf)	800 m	1:44.30
2024	World Indoor Championships	Glasgow, United Kingdom	20th (h)	800 m	1:48.07
2024	European Championships	Rome, Italy	12th (h)	800 m	1:46.12
2024	Olympic Games	Paris, France	7th (rep)	800 m	1:45.27

== Personal bests ==
Outdoor

- 400 metres – 48.58 (Ostróda 2018)
- 800 metres – 1:45.42 (Berlin 2018)
- 1000 metres – 2:18.88 (Szczecin 2018)
- 1500 metres – 3:41.97 (Gdańsk 2015)

Indoor

- 400 metres – 49.96 (Bratislava 2017)
- 600 metres – 1:18.36 (Łódź 2018)
- 800 metres – 1:47.11 (Toruń 2017)
- 1000 metres – 2:26.11 (Łódź 2016)
- 1500 metres – 3:45.83 (Spała 2016)
