= Cleiton Abrão =

Brazilian middle-distance runner

Personal information
- Full name: Cleiton Cezario Abrão
- Born: 8 September 1989 (age 36)
- Education: Universidade Paulista
- Height: 1.80 m (5 ft 11 in)
- Weight: 72 kg (159 lb)

Sport
- Sport: Athletics
- Event: 800 metres
- Updated on 29 August 2015

Cleiton Cezario Abrão (born 8 September 1989) is a Brazilian middle-distance runner competing primarily in the 800 metres. He represented his country at the 2015 World Championships in Beijing without advancing from the first round.

His personal best in the event is 1:45.59 set in São Paulo in 2014.

== Competition record ==
Year	Competition	Venue	Position	Event	Notes
Representing Brazil
2015	Pan American Games	Toronto, Canada	5th	800 m	1:48.82
2015	World Championships	Beijing, China	42nd (h)	800 m	1:49.79
2017	Universiade	Taipei, Taiwan	23rd (sf)	800 m	1:54.16
2017	Universiade	Taipei, Taiwan	15th (h)	4 × 400 m relay	3:15.27
