= Michał Rozmys =

Polish middle-distance runner

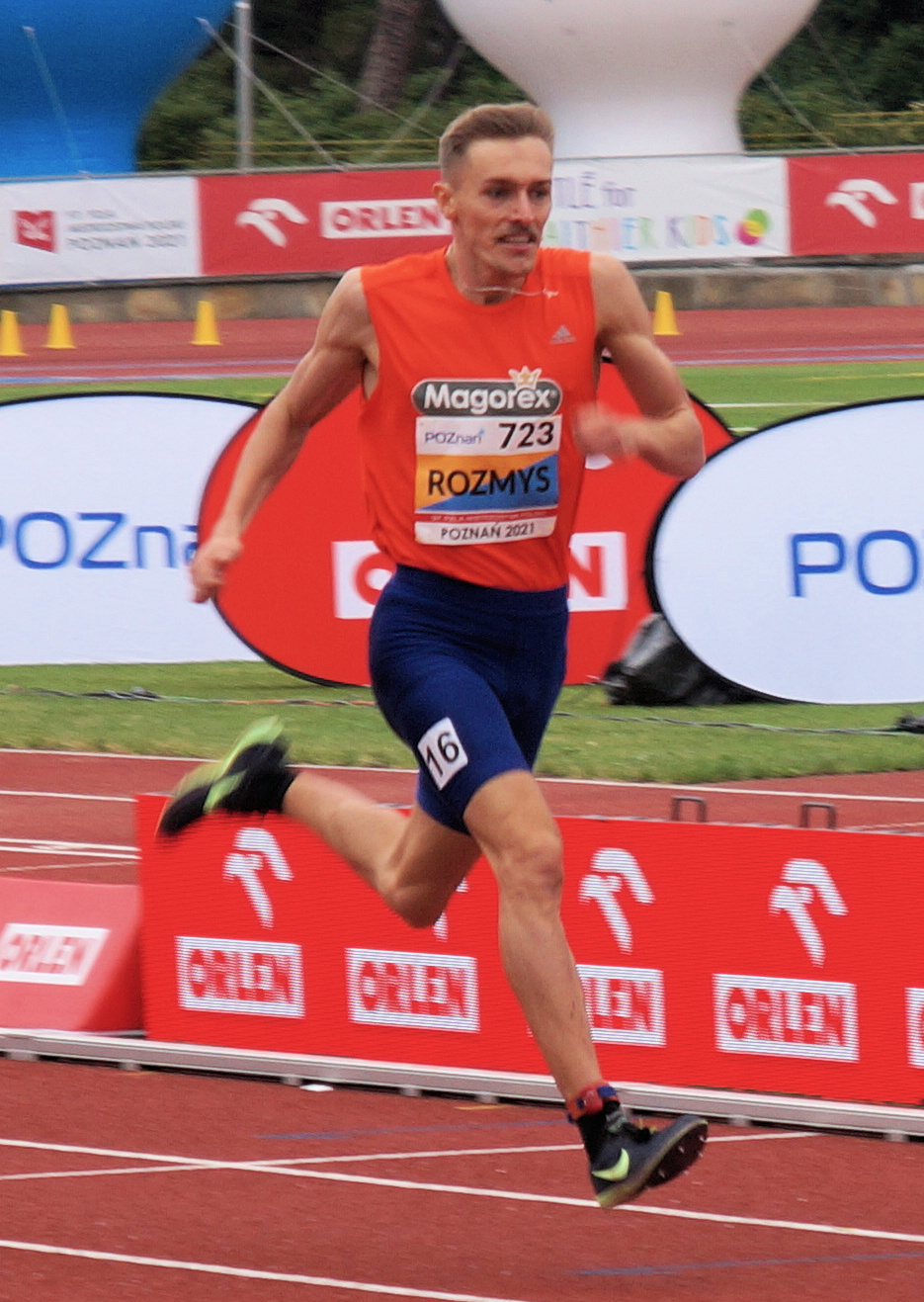
- Rozmys in 2021

Personal information
- Born: 13 March 1995 (age 31) Lubsko, Poland
- Education: Szczecin University
- Height: 1.87 m (6 ft 2 in)
- Weight: 72 kg (159 lb)

Sport
- Sport: Athletics
- Events: 800 m, 1500 m
- Club: MLKS Agros Żary (–2015); UKS Barnim Goleniów (2015–)
- Coached by: Krzysztof Skorupa (–2015); Jacek Kostrzeba (2015–)
Medal record
Athletics
Representing Poland
European Team Championships
Bronze medal – third place	2021 Chorzów	1500 m
Summer Universiade
Gold medal – first place	2019 Naples	1500 m
Military World Games
Gold medal – first place	2019 Wuhan	800 metres
Gold medal – first place	2019 Wuhan	1500 metres
European Athletics U23 Championships
Bronze medal – third place	2017 Bydgoszcz	1500 m
Polish Athletics Championships
Gold medal – first place	2017 Białystok	800 m
Gold medal – first place	2020 Włocławek	1500 m
Gold medal – first place	2022 Suwałki	1500 m
Silver medal – second place	2019 Radom	800 m
Silver medal – second place	2020 Włocławek	800 m
Silver medal – second place	2021 Poznań	1500 m
Bronze medal – third place	2016 Bydgoszcz	800 m
Bronze medal – third place	2018 Lublin	800 m
Bronze medal – third place	2018 Lublin	1500 m
Polish Indoor Athletics Championships
Gold medal – first place	2019 Toruń	1500 m
Gold medal – first place	2021 Toruń	3000 m
Gold medal – first place	2022 Toruń	1500 m
Gold medal – first place	2022 Toruń	3000 m
Silver medal – second place	2021 Toruń	1500 m

Michał Rozmys (born 13 March 1995 in Lubsko) is a Polish middle-distance runner. He represented his country in the 800 metres at the 2017 World Championships. In addition, he won a bronze medal in the 1500 metres at the 2017 European U23 Championships and a gold at the 2019 Summer Universiade.

Rozmys received media coverage worldwide when competing in the Athletics at the 2020 Summer Olympics – Men's 1500 metres he lost a shoe but continued to finish his semifinal race with just one shoe on.

== International competitions ==
Year	Competition	Venue	Position	Event	Notes
Representing Poland
2017	European U23 Championships	Bydgoszcz, Poland	3rd	1500 m	3:49.30
2017	World Championships	London, United Kingdom	9th (sf)	800 m	1:46.10
2017	World Championships	London, United Kingdom	22nd (sf)	1500 m	3:42.94
2017	Universiade	Taipei, Taiwan	7th (sf)	800 m	1:48.71
2018	European Championships	Berlin, Germany	4th	800 m	1:45.32
2019	European Indoor Championships	Glasgow, United Kingdom	18th (h)	800 m	1:49.35
2019	Universiade	Naples, Italy	1st	1500 m	3:53.67
2019	Military World Games	Wuhan, China	1st	800 m	1:49.00
2019	Military World Games	Wuhan, China	1st	1500 m	3:46.33
2021	European Indoor Championships	Toruń, Poland	6th	1500 m	3:40.11
2021	Olympic Games	Tokyo, Japan	8th	1500 m	3:32.67
2022	World Indoor Championships	Belgrade, Serbia	7th	1500 m	3:36.71
2022	World Championships	Eugene, United States	10th	1500 m	3:34.58
2022	European Championships	Munich, Germany	7th	1500 m	3:37.63
2023	European Indoor Championships	Istanbul, Turkey	9th	1500 m	3:43.09
2023	World Championships	Budapest, Hungary	25th (h)	1500 m	3:36.26
2024	European Championships	Rome, Italy	28th (h)	800 m	1:47.46

== Personal bests ==
Outdoor

- 400 metres – 48.95 (Ostróda 2018)
- 600 metres – 1:16.81 (Chojnice 2018)
- 800 metres – 1:45.32 (Berlin 2018)
- 1000 metres – 2:17.21 (Sopot 2021)
- 1500 metres – 3:32.67 (Tokyo 2021)
- One mile – 3:55.13 (Oslo 2022)
- 3000 metres – 8:11.90 (Lille 2017)

Indoor

- 800 metres – 1:47.29 (Karlsruhe 2019)
- 1000 metres – 2:31.72 (Spała 2012)
- 1500 metres – 3:36.10 (Toruń 2021)
- 3000 metres – 7:49.83 (Toruń 2022)
