= 2017 European Athletics U23 Championships – Men's 800 metres =

The men's 800 metres event at the 2017 European Athletics U23 Championships was held in Bydgoszcz, Poland, at Zdzisław Krzyszkowiak Stadium on 14 and 16 July.

== Medalists ==
Gold	Andreas Kramer; Sweden
Silver	Daniel Rowden; Great Britain
Bronze	Marc Reuther; Germany

== Results ==
=== Heats ===
14 July

Qualification rule: First 2 (Q) and the next 2 fastest (q) qualified for the final.

Rank	Heat	Name	Nationality	Time	Notes
1	2	Andreas Kramer	Sweden	1:46.93	Q, PB
2	2	Pablo Sánchez-Valladares	Spain	1:47.02	Q
3	2	Filip Šnejdr	Czech Republic	1:47.08	q, PB
4	2	Yan Sloma	Belarus	1:47.16	q, PB
5	2	Christoph Kessler	Germany	1:47.31	
6	1	Daniel Rowden	Great Britain	1:47.51	Q
7	1	Mateusz Borkowski	Poland	1:47.69	Q, SB
8	1	Aymeric Lusine	France	1:47.92	
9	2	Benediktas Mickus	Lithuania	1:49.22	
10	2	Rasmus Kisel	Estonia	1:49.40	PB
11	1	Pol Moya	Andorra	1:49.48	
12	3	Cosmin Trofin	Romania	1:49.50	Q
13	3	Marc Reuther	Germany	1:49.71	Q
14	1	Jan Petrač	Slovenia	1:49.85	
15	3	Nasredine Khatir	France	1:49.92	
16	3	Tony van Diepen	Netherlands	1:50.38	
17	3	Lukáš Hodboď	Czech Republic	1:50.72	
18	3	Jonas Schöpfer	Switzerland	1:51.33	
19	1	Gergo Kiss	Hungary	1:51.75	
20	1	Rolands Jierkis	Latvia	1:53.03	
21	3	Matúš Talán	Slovakia	1:53.13	

=== Final ===
16 July

Rank	Name	Nationality	Time	Notes
1st place, gold medalist(s)	Andreas Kramer	Sweden	1:48.15	
2nd place, silver medalist(s)	Daniel Rowden	Great Britain	1:48.16	
3rd place, bronze medalist(s)	Marc Reuther	Germany	1:48.66	
4	Mateusz Borkowski	Poland	1:48.92	
5	Filip Šnejdr	Czech Republic	1:49.19	
6	Cosmin Trofin	Romania	1:49.81	
7	Yan Sloma	Belarus	1:50.02	
8	Pablo Sánchez-Valladares	Spain	1:59.93	
