= Yevhen Hutsol =

Ukrainian athlete (born 1990)

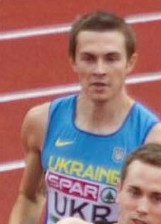
Yevhen Hutsol in 2016

Yevhen Hutsol (Ukrainian: Євген Гуцол; born 13 May 1990) is a Ukrainian athlete specialising in the 400 and 800 metres. He represented his country in the 4 × 400 metres relay at the 2013 World Championships, as well as two indoor World Championships in 2012 and 2014. His biggest individual success is the fifth place at the 2015 European Indoor Championships.

His personal bests in the 400 metres are 45.89 outdoors (Erzurum 2017) and 46.72 seconds indoors (Sumy 2015). His personal bests in the 800 metres are 1:46.56 outdoors (Kropyvnytskiy 2018) and 1:47:66 indoors (Ostrava 2021).

== Competition record ==
Year	Competition	Venue	Position	Event	Notes
Representing Ukraine
2011	European Indoor Championships	Paris, France	14th (h)	400 m	47.81
2011	European U23 Championships	Ostrava, Czech Republic	7th	400 m	46.56
2012	World Indoor Championships	Istanbul, Turkey	6th (h)	4 × 400 m relay	3:08.92
2012	European Championships	Helsinki, Finland	7th	4 × 400 m relay	3:04.56
2013	World Championships	Moscow, Russia	21st (h)	4 × 400 m relay	3:04.98
2014	World Indoor Championships	Sopot, Poland	6th	4 × 400 m relay	3:08.79
2014	European Championships	Zürich, Switzerland	34th (h)	400 m	46.96
2014	European Championships	Zürich, Switzerland	–	4 × 400 m relay	DQ
2015	European Indoor Championships	Prague, Czech Republic	5th	400 m	46.73
2016	European Championships	Amsterdam, Netherlands	17th (h)	400 m	47.35
2016	European Championships	Amsterdam, Netherlands	6th	4 × 400 m relay	3:04.45
2017	European Indoor Championships	Belgrade, Serbia	18th (h)	400 m	47.77
2017	European Indoor Championships	Belgrade, Serbia	5th	4 × 400 m relay	3:09.64
2017	Universiade	Taipei, Taiwan	18th (sf)	800 m	1:49.97
2018	European Championships	Berlin, Germany	14th (sf)	800 m	1:47.29
2019	European Indoor Championships	Glasgow, United Kingdom	26th (h)	800 m	1:50.29
2021	European Indoor Championships	Toruń, Poland	17th (h)	800 m	1:49.82
