= Aymeric Lusine =

French middle-distance runner

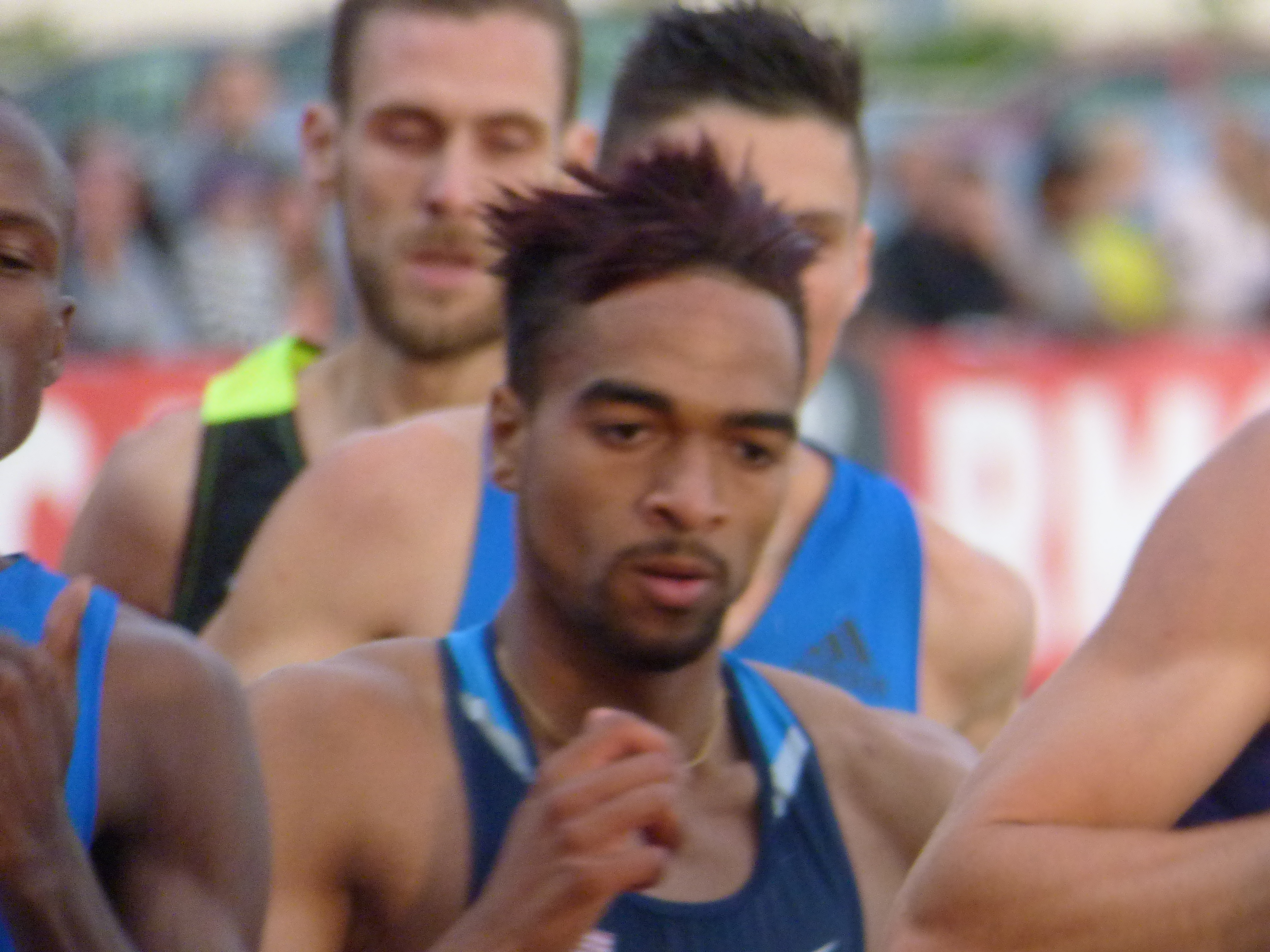
- Lusine in 2017

Personal information
- Born: 13 September 1995 (age 30) Saint-Saulve, France
- Education: University of Poitiers
- Height: 174 cm (5 ft 9 in)
- Weight: 62 kg (137 lb)

Sport
- Sport: Athletics
- Event: 800 metres
- Club: Entente Poitiers Athlétisme 86
- Coached by: Gerard Lacroix (2014–2018); Bruno Gajer (2018–)

Aymeric Lusine (born 13 September 1995) is a French middle-distance runner specialising in the 800 metres. He won a bronze medal at the 2017 Summer Universiade.

== International competitions ==
| Year | Competition | Venue | Position | Event | Notes |
Representing France
| 2017 | European U23 Championships | Bydgoszcz, Poland | 8th (h) | 800 m | 1:47.92 |
| 2017 | Universiade | Taipei, Taiwan | 3rd | 800 m | 1:47.18 |
| 2019 | European Indoor Championships | Glasgow, United Kingdom | 4th (sf) | 800 m | 1:49.48 |
| 2019 | Universiade | Naples, Italy | 3rd (sf) | 800 m | 1:48.02^{1} |

^{1}Disqualified in the final

== Personal bests ==
Outdoor

- 400 metres – 47.84 (Bordeaux 2017)
- 800 metres – 1:46.08 (Poitiers 2017)

Indoor

- 400 metres – 48.95 (Miramas 2019)
- 800 metres – 1:47.69 (Reims 2019)
