= Mouad Zahafi =

Moroccan middle-distance runner

Moad Zahafi (born 9 May 1998) is a Moroccan runner who specializes in the 800 metres.

He represented Morocco at the 2019 Summer Universiade in Naples, Italy and he won the silver medal in the men's 800 metres event. He also competed at the 2019 African Games and the 2019 World Championships without reaching the final.

Zahafi competes at the collegiate level for Texas Tech. On 16 April 2022, he ran a world-leading time of 1:43.69 at the Tom Jones Memorial in Gainesville, Florida, recording the third-fastest time in NCAA history.
