= Tolokonnikov =

Tolokonnikov (Russian: Толоконников) is a Russian masculine surname. Its feminine counterpart is Tolokonnikova. It may refer to:

- Konstantin Tolokonnikov (born 1996), Russian middle-distance runner
- Nadezhda Tolokonnikova (born 1989), Russian conceptual artist and political activist
- Vladimir Tolokonnikov (1943 - 2017), Soviet actor
- Vladimir Tolokonnikov (born 1973), Soviet and Russian ice hockey player
