= 2015 World Youth Championships in Athletics – Boys' 800 metres =

Boys' 800 metres at the 2015 World Youth Championships in Athletics
- Venue: Estadio Olímpico Pascual Guerrero
- Dates: 15, 16 and 18 July
- Competitors: 37 from 29 nations
- Winning time: 1:45.58

Medalists
gold medal	Willy Tarbei	Kenya
silver medal	Kipyegon Bett	Kenya
bronze medal	Luis Fernando Pires	Brazil

The boys' 800 metres at the 2015 World Youth Championships in Athletics was held at the Estadio Olímpico Pascual Guerrero in Cali, Colombia on 15, 16 and 18 July 2015.

== Records ==
Prior to the competition, the following records were as follows.

World Youth Best	Mohammed Aman (ETH)	1:43.37	Rieti, Italy	10 September 2011
Championship Record	Leonard Kirwa Kosencha (KEN)	1:44.08	Lille, France	9 July 2011
World Youth Leading	Willy Tarbei (KEN)	1:44.51	Nairobi, Kenya	17 June 2015

== Results ==
=== Round 1 ===
First 4 in each heat (Q) and the next 4 fastest (q) advance to the semifinals.

Rank	Heat	Name	Nationality	Time	Note
1	5	Omer Amano	Ethiopia	1:50.31	Q
2	2	Willy Tarbei	Kenya	1:50.92	Q
3	2	Theuns Ehlers	South Africa	1:51.22	Q
4	3	Kipyegon Bett	Kenya	1:51.38	Q
5	4	Ben Greenwood	Great Britain	1:51.58	Q
6	3	Kazuyoshi Tamogami	Japan	1:51.89	Q
7	5	Iskander Jhinaoui	Tunisia	1:52.04	Q, PB
8	2	Godfrey Chama	Zambia	1:52.28	Q, SB
9	4	Andrea Romani	Italy	1:52.35	Q
10	4	Andrey Belokon	Russia	1:52.47	Q
11	4	Thierry-Orden Dagbetin	France	1:52.54	Q
12	4	Leon Clarke	Jamaica	1:52.64	q
13	2	Warsame Doley	Sweden	1:52.68	Q
14	4	Andrej Mitašík	Slovakia	1:52.70	q
15	3	Ryan Sánchez	Puerto Rico	1:52.92	Q
16	3	Tahar Lazaar	Algeria	1:53.03	Q
17	5	Cameron Cooper	United States	1:53.04	Q
18	5	Takuto Hanamura	Japan	1:53.17	Q
19	3	Luis Fernando Pires	Brazil	1:53.26	q
20	1	Pascal Kleyer	Germany	1:53.28	Q
21	1	Beant Singh	India	1:53.32	Q
22	5	Václav Staněk	Czech Republic	1:53.33	q
23	1	Achraf El-Maliky	Morocco	1:53.44	Q
24	1	Conor Dunne	United States	1:53.60	Q
25	2	Dean Ellenwood	Canada	1:53.70	
26	4	Tilen Šimenko Lalič	Slovenia	1:53.98	PB
27	1	Eduardo Romero	Spain	1:54.37	
28	4	Siro Piña	Spain	1:54.79	
29	2	Athanásios Kalákos	Greece	1:54.88	
30	3	Mohammed Al-Bzaznah	Iraq	1:55.13	
31	5	Anass Mghar	Morocco	1:55.35	
32	2	El-Hadi Hamid	Sudan	1:55.43	
33	1	Marcell Kovács	Hungary	1:55.81	
33	5	Richárd Süli	Hungary	1:55.81	
35	5	Zinedine Selis	Costa Rica	1:56.18	
36	3	Taylor Lyman	Canada	2:02.05	
–	1	Temam Tura	Ethiopia	DQ	

=== Semifinal ===
First 2 in each heat (Q) and the next 2 fastest (q) advance to the final.

Rank	Heat	Name	Nationality	Time	Note
1	1	Kipyegon Bett	Kenya	1:47.11	Q
2	2	Willy Tarbei	Kenya	1:48.68	Q
3	1	Kazuyoshi Tamogami	Japan	1:50.31	Q, PB
4	3	Omer Amano	Ethiopia	1:50.56	Q
5	2	Luis Fernando Pires	Brazil	1:50.67	Q, PB
6	1	Leon Clarke	Jamaica	1:50.70	q, PB
7	3	Theuns Ehlers	South Africa	1:51.01	Q
8	1	Pascal Kleyer	Germany	1:51.41	q
9	3	Andrea Romani	Italy	1:51.54	
10	3	Godfrey Chama	Zambia	1:51.56	SB
11	3	Conor Dunne	United States	1:51.63	PB
12	2	Achraf El-Maliky	Morocco	1:52.23	
13	1	Warsame Doley	Sweden	1:52.34	
14	1	Beant Singh	India	1:52.53	
15	2	Iskander Jhinaoui	Tunisia	1:53.44	
16	2	Thierry-Orden Dagbetin	France	1:54.47	
17	2	Cameron Cooper	United States	1:54.71	
18	3	Ryan Sánchez	Puerto Rico	1:57.02	
19	1	Andrej Mitašík	Slovakia	1:57.09	
20	2	Takuto Hanamura	Japan	1:57.69	
21	1	Ben Greenwood	Great Britain	1:59.06	
22	2	Tahar Lazaar	Algeria	2:00.31	
23	3	Andrey Belokon	Russia	2:02.38	
–	3	Václav Staněk	Czech Republic	DNS	

=== Final ===
Rank	Name	Nationality	Time	Note
1st place, gold medalist(s)	Willy Tarbei	Kenya	1:45.58	
2nd place, silver medalist(s)	Kipyegon Bett	Kenya	1:45.86	
3rd place, bronze medalist(s)	Luis Fernando Pires	Brazil	1:48.61	PB
4	Omer Amano	Ethiopia	1:49.11	
5	Theuns Ehlers	South Africa	1:49.32	PB
6	Leon Clarke	Jamaica	1:51.71	
7	Kazuyoshi Tamogami	Japan	1:52.58	
8	Pascal Kleyer	Germany	1:55.92	
