= 2014 World Junior Championships in Athletics – Men's 800 metres =

The men's 800 metres event at the 2014 World Junior Championships in Athletics was held in Eugene, Oregon, USA, at Hayward Field on 25, 26 and 27 July.

== Medalists ==
Gold	Alfred Kipketer; Kenya
Silver	Joshua Tiampati Masikonde; Kenya
Bronze	Andreas Almgren; Sweden

== Records ==
Standing records prior to the 2014 World Junior Championships in Athletics
World Junior Record	Nijel Amos (BOT)	1:41.73	London, Great Britain	9 August 2012
Championship Record	Nijel Amos (BOT)	1:43.79	Barcelona, Spain	15 July 2012
World Junior Leading	Robert Biwott (KEN)	1:44.69	Shanghai, China	18 May 2014
Broken records during the 2014 World Junior Championships in Athletics

== Results ==
=== Final ===
27 July
Start time: 16:13 Temperature: 29 °C Humidity: 35 %

Rank	Name	Nationality	Lane	Time	Notes
1st place, gold medalist(s)	Alfred Kipketer	Kenya	4	1:43.95	WJL
2nd place, silver medalist(s)	Joshua Tiampati Masikonde	Kenya	6	1:45.14	PB
3rd place, bronze medalist(s)	Andreas Almgren	Sweden	3	1:45.65	NJR
4	Thiago André	Brazil	8	1:46.06	PB
5	Jena Umar	Ethiopia	5	1:46.23	PB
6	Tre'tez Kinnaird	United States	1	1:47.13	PB
7	Kalle Berglund	Sweden	2	1:47.31	PB
8	Kyle Langford	United Kingdom	7	1:55.21	

Intermediate times:
400m: 49.42 Alfred Kipketer

=== Semifinals ===
26 July
First 2 in each heat (Q) and the next 2 fastest (q) advance to the Final

==== Summary ====
Rank	Name	Nationality	Time	Notes
1	Tre'tez Kinnaird	United States	1:48.04	Q
2	Joshua Tiampati Masikonde	Kenya	1:48.09	Q
3	Thiago André	Brazil	1:48.16	Q
4	Kalle Berglund	Sweden	1:48.57	q PB
5	Alfred Kipketer	Kenya	1:48.67	Q
6	Kyle Langford	United Kingdom	1:48.76	Q
7	Jena Umar	Ethiopia	1:48.81	q
8	Andreas Almgren	Sweden	1:48.87	Q
9	Nikolaus Franzmair	Austria	1:48.94	
10	Enrico Riccobon	Italy	1:49.40	
11	Nasredine Khatir	France	1:49.79	
12	Karl Griffin	Ireland	1:49.97	
13	Lucijan Zalokar	Slovenia	1:50.06	
14	Yan Sloma	Belarus	1:50.19	
15	Axel Vives	Spain	1:50.81	
16	Tony van Diepen	Netherlands	1:50.86	
17	Theo Blundell	United Kingdom	1:51.12	
18	Takieddine Hedeilli	Algeria	1:51.28	
19	Mamush Lencha	Ethiopia	1:51.41	
20	Andrés González	Puerto Rico	1:51.53	
21	Aurèle Vandeputte	Belgium	1:51.57	
22	Dominik Stadlmann	Austria	1:52.73	
23	Luke Mathews	Australia	1:55.92	
	Konstantin Tolokonnikov	Russia	DNF	

==== Details ====
First 2 in each heat (Q) and the next 2 fastest (q) advance to the Final

===== Semifinal 1 =====
27 July
Start time: 16:21 Temperature: 31 °C Humidity: 27%

Rank	Name	Nationality	Lane	Time	Notes
1	Alfred Kipketer	Kenya	3	1:48.67	Q
2	Kyle Langford	United Kingdom	6	1:48.76	Q
3	Jena Umar	Ethiopia	5	1:48.81	q
4	Tony van Diepen	Netherlands	1	1:50.86	
5	Andrés González	Puerto Rico	2	1:51.53	
6	Aurèle Vandeputte	Belgium	4	1:51.57	
7	Dominik Stadlmann	Austria	7	1:52.73	
8	Luke Mathews	Australia	8	1:55.92	

Intermediate times:
400m: 54.36 Alfred Kipketer

===== Semifinal 2 =====
27 July
Start time: 16:30 Temperature: 31 °C Humidity: 27%

Rank	Name	Nationality	Lane	Time	Notes
1	Joshua Tiampati Masikonde	Kenya	5	1:48.09	Q
2	Andreas Almgren	Sweden	3	1:48.87	Q
3	Nasredine Khatir	France	4	1:49.79	
4	Karl Griffin	Ireland	6	1:49.97	
5	Lucijan Zalokar	Slovenia	2	1:50.06	
6	Yan Sloma	Belarus	1	1:50.19	
7	Axel Vives	Spain	7	1:50.81	
8	Theo Blundell	United Kingdom	8	1:51.12	

Intermediate times:
400m: 53.94 Joshua Tiampati Masikonde

===== Semifinal 3 =====
27 July
Start time: 16:38 Temperature: 31 °C Humidity: 27%

Rank	Name	Nationality	Lane	Time	Notes
1	Tre'tez Kinnaird	United States	6	1:48.04	Q
2	Thiago André	Brazil	5	1:48.16	Q
3	Kalle Berglund	Sweden	2	1:48.57	q PB
4	Nikolaus Franzmair	Austria	3	1:48.94	
5	Enrico Riccobon	Italy	8	1:49.40	
6	Takieddine Hedeilli	Algeria	1	1:51.28	
7	Mamush Lencha	Ethiopia	4	1:51.41	
	Konstantin Tolokonnikov	Russia	7	DNF	

Intermediate times:
400m: 53.86 Tre'tez Kinnaird

=== Heats ===
25 July
First 3 in each heat (Q) and the next 6 fastest (q) advance to the Semi-Finals

==== Summary ====
Rank	Name	Nationality	Time	Notes
1	Joshua Tiampati Masikonde	Kenya	1:47.84	Q
2	Thiago André	Brazil	1:48.05	Q
3	Dominik Stadlmann	Austria	1:49.07	Q PB
4	Nikolaus Franzmair	Austria	1:49.30	Q
5	Aurèle Vandeputte	Belgium	1:49.40	q
6	Jena Umar	Ethiopia	1:49.44	Q
7	Yan Sloma	Belarus	1:49.48	q PB
8	Kyle Langford	United Kingdom	1:49.73	Q
9	Alfred Kipketer	Kenya	1:49.80	Q
10	Lucijan Zalokar	Slovenia	1:49.84	q
11	Theo Blundell	United Kingdom	1:49.89	Q
12	Enrico Riccobon	Italy	1:49.96	Q
13	Tony van Diepen	Netherlands	1:50.04	Q
14	Tre'tez Kinnaird	United States	1:50.07	Q
15	Andrés González	Puerto Rico	1:50.10	Q PB
16	Takieddine Hedeilli	Algeria	1:50.15	q
17	Nasredine Khatir	France	1:50.18	q
18	Konstantin Tolokonnikov	Russia	1:50.19	q
19	Andreas Almgren	Sweden	1:50.27	Q
20	Alberto Guerrero	Spain	1:50.53	
21	Karl Griffin	Ireland	1:50.69	Q
22	Luke Mathews	Australia	1:50.76	Q
23	Axel Vives	Spain	1:50.77	Q
24	Abubaker Haydar Abdalla	Qatar	1:50.79	
25	Vincent Hazeleger	Netherlands	1:50.90	
26	Kalle Berglund	Sweden	1:50.99	Q
27	Jordan Makins	Australia	1:51.02	
28	Mamush Lencha	Ethiopia	1:51.23	Q
29	Elijah Silva	Canada	1:51.26	
30	Andrés Arroyo	Puerto Rico	1:51.63	
31	Robert Heppenstall	Canada	1:51.66	
32	Utku Çobanoğlu	Turkey	1:51.73	
33	Jawad Douhri	Morocco	1:51.76	
34	Lorenzo Pilati	Italy	1:51.87	
35	Kevon Robinson	Jamaica	1:51.89	
36	Abraham Tsegay Tesfamariam	Eritrea	1:52.16	
37	Jonas Schöpfer	Switzerland	1:52.26	
38	Marc Reuther	Germany	1:52.33	
39	Kristian Uldbjerg Hansen	Denmark	1:52.35	
40	Jesús Tonatiu López	Mexico	1:52.59	
41	Gergő Kiss	Hungary	1:52.73	
42	Robert Tully	Ireland	1:52.86	
43	Myles Marshall	United States	1:53.98	
44	Rosel Lusanga Kafwa	DR Congo	1:54.81	PB
45	Mohamed El Nour Mohamed	Qatar	1:55.17	
46	Nicholas Landeau	Trinidad and Tobago	1:56.40	
47	Pol Moya	Andorra	1:58.44	
	Omar Rosales	Mexico	DQ	163.3(a)

==== Details ====
First 3 in each heat (Q) and the next 6 fastest (q) advance to the Semi-Finals

===== Heat 1 =====
27 July
Start time: 12:48 Temperature: 22 °C Humidity: 50%

Rank	Name	Nationality	Lane	Time	Notes
1	Luke Mathews	Australia	1	1:50.76	Q
2	Kalle Berglund	Sweden	7	1:50.99	Q
3	Mamush Lencha	Ethiopia	8	1:51.23	Q
4	Andrés Arroyo	Puerto Rico	3	1:51.63	
5	Marc Reuther	Germany	4	1:52.33	
6	Rosel Lusanga Kafwa	DR Congo	5	1:54.81	PB
7	Mohamed El Nour Mohamed	Qatar	2	1:55.17	
	Omar Rosales	Mexico	6	DQ	163.3(a)

Note:
IAAF Rule 163.3(a) - Lane infringement

Intermediate times:
400m: 57.26 Kalle Berglund

===== Heat 2 =====
27 July
Start time: 12:55 Temperature: 22 °C Humidity: 50%

Rank	Name	Nationality	Lane	Time	Notes
1	Andreas Almgren	Sweden	2	1:50.27	Q
2	Karl Griffin	Ireland	8	1:50.69	Q
3	Axel Vives	Spain	4	1:50.77	Q
4	Jordan Makins	Australia	1	1:51.02	
5	Robert Heppenstall	Canada	6	1:51.66	
6	Jonas Schöpfer	Switzerland	5	1:52.26	
7	Kristian Uldbjerg Hansen	Denmark	7	1:52.35	
8	Myles Marshall	United States	3	1:53.98	

Intermediate times:
400m: 55.17 Andreas Almgren

===== Heat 3 =====
27 July
Start time: 13:01 Temperature: 22 °C Humidity: 50%

Rank	Name	Nationality	Lane	Time	Notes
1	Alfred Kipketer	Kenya	4	1:49.80	Q
2	Tony van Diepen	Netherlands	5	1:50.04	Q
3	Tre'tez Kinnaird	United States	8	1:50.07	Q
4	Nasredine Khatir	France	2	1:50.18	q
5	Elijah Silva	Canada	3	1:51.26	
6	Utku Çobanoğlu	Turkey	6	1:51.73	
7	Abraham Tsegay Tesfamariam	Eritrea	1	1:52.16	
8	Gergő Kiss	Hungary	7	1:52.73	

Intermediate times:
400m: 54.79 Alfred Kipketer

===== Heat 4 =====
27 July
Start time: 13:07 Temperature: 22 °C Humidity: 50%

Rank	Name	Nationality	Lane	Time	Notes
1	Jena Umar	Ethiopia	4	1:49.44	Q
2	Kyle Langford	United Kingdom	3	1:49.73	Q
3	Enrico Riccobon	Italy	7	1:49.96	Q
4	Konstantin Tolokonnikov	Russia	8	1:50.19	q
5	Vincent Hazeleger	Netherlands	2	1:50.90	
6	Kevon Robinson	Jamaica	6	1:51.89	
7	Jesús Tonatiu López	Mexico	5	1:52.59	
8	Nicholas Landeau	Trinidad and Tobago	1	1:56.40	

Intermediate times:
400m: 54.31 Jena Umar

===== Heat 5 =====
27 July
Start time: 13:13 Temperature: 24 °C Humidity: 41%

Rank	Name	Nationality	Lane	Time	Notes
1	Joshua Tiampati Masikonde	Kenya	3	1:47.84	Q
2	Thiago André	Brazil	5	1:48.05	Q
3	Dominik Stadlmann	Austria	1	1:49.07	Q PB
4	Aurèle Vandeputte	Belgium	4	1:49.40	q
5	Yan Sloma	Belarus	6	1:49.48	q PB
6	Lucijan Zalokar	Slovenia	2	1:49.84	q
7	Lorenzo Pilati	Italy	7	1:51.87	
8	Pol Moya	Andorra	8	1:58.44	

Intermediate times:
400m: 53.24 Joshua Tiampati Masikonde

===== Heat 6 =====
27 July
Start time: 13:18 Temperature: 24 °C Humidity: 41%

Rank	Name	Nationality	Lane	Time	Notes
1	Nikolaus Franzmair	Austria	3	1:49.30	Q
2	Theo Blundell	United Kingdom	6	1:49.89	Q
3	Andrés González	Puerto Rico	1	1:50.10	Q PB
4	Takieddine Hedeilli	Algeria	4	1:50.15	q
5	Alberto Guerrero	Spain	2	1:50.53	
6	Abubaker Haydar Abdalla	Qatar	7	1:50.79	
7	Jawad Douhri	Morocco	8	1:51.76	
8	Robert Tully	Ireland	5	1:52.86	

Intermediate times:
400m: 52.07 Robert Tully

== Participation ==
According to an unofficial count, 48 athletes from 33 countries participated in the event.

- Algeria (1)
- Andorra (1)
- Australia (2)
- Austria (2)
- Belarus (1)
- Belgium (1)
- Brazil (1)
- Canada (2)
- DR Congo (1)
- Denmark (1)
- Eritrea (1)
- Ethiopia (2)
- France (1)
- Germany (1)
- Hungary (1)
- Ireland (2)
- Italy (2)
- Jamaica (1)
- Kenya (2)
- Mexico (2)
- Morocco (1)
- Netherlands (2)
- Puerto Rico (2)
- Qatar (2)
- Russia (1)
- Slovenia (1)
- Spain (2)
- Sweden (2)
- Switzerland (1)
- Trinidad and Tobago (1)
- Turkey (1)
- United Kingdom (2)
- United States (2)
