= Wake Forest Demon Deacons track and field =

College track and field team

- University: Wake Forest University
- Head coach: John Hayes
- Conference: ACC
- Location: Winston-Salem, North Carolina
- Outdoor track: Kentner Stadium
- Nickname: Demon Deacons
- Colors: Old gold and black

The Wake Forest Demon Deacons track and field team is the track and field program that represents Wake Forest University. The Demon Deacons compete in NCAA Division I as a member of the Atlantic Coast Conference. The team is based in Winston-Salem, North Carolina at the Kentner Stadium.

The program is coached by John Hayes. The track and field program officially encompasses four teams because the NCAA considers men's and women's indoor track and field and outdoor track and field as separate sports.

Andy Bloom is the only multiple-time NCAA champion for Wake Forest, in both the shot put and discus throw at the 1996 NCAA Division I Outdoor Track and Field Championships.

== Postseason ==
As of 2024, a total of 10 men and 13 women have achieved individual first-team All-American status at the Division I men's outdoor, women's outdoor, men's indoor, or women's indoor national championships (using the modern criteria of top-8 placing regardless of athlete nationality).

First team NCAA All-Americans
| Team | Championships | Name | Event | Place | Ref. |
|---|---|---|---|---|---|
| Women's | 1985 Outdoor | Karen Dunn | 3000 meters | 8th | |
| Men's | 1990 Outdoor | Steve Brown | 110 meters hurdles | 2nd | |
| Women's | 1992 Outdoor | Janice Brown | 5000 meters | 5th | |
| Men's | 1995 Outdoor | Warren Sherman | 800 meters | 6th | |
| Men's | 1995 Outdoor | Andy Bloom | Discus throw | 2nd | |
| Women's | 1995 Outdoor | Jennifer Finnegan | 1500 meters | 4th | |
| Women's | 1995 Outdoor | Catrina Bindel | Heptathlon | 7th | |
| Men's | 1996 Outdoor | Andy Bloom | Shot put | 1st | |
| Men's | 1996 Outdoor | Andy Bloom | Discus throw | 1st | |
| Men's | 1999 Outdoor | Nolan Swanson | 10,000 meters | 4th | |
| Women's | 2000 Outdoor | Janelle Kraus | 5000 meters | 7th | |
| Women's | 2001 Indoor | Jill Snyder | Mile run | 8th | |
| Women's | 2001 Indoor | Sara Day | 3000 meters | 8th | |
| Women's | 2001 Indoor | Jill Snyder | Distance medley relay | 4th | |
| Women's | 2001 Indoor | Carol Merritt | Distance medley relay | 4th | |
| Women's | 2001 Indoor | Nikeya Green | Distance medley relay | 4th | |
| Women's | 2001 Indoor | Sara Day | Distance medley relay | 4th | |
| Women's | 2001 Outdoor | Sara Day | 10,000 meters | 2nd | |
| Women's | 2002 Indoor | Nikeya Green | 800 meters | 8th | |
| Women's | 2003 Indoor | Annie Bersagel | 5000 meters | 7th | |
| Women's | 2003 Outdoor | Nikeya Green | 800 meters | 8th | |
| Women's | 2003 Outdoor | Annie Bersagel | 10,000 meters | 7th | |
| Women's | 2004 Outdoor | Nikeya Green | 800 meters | 5th | |
| Women's | 2004 Outdoor | Annie Bersagel | 10,000 meters | 8th | |
| Women's | 2005 Indoor | Annie Bersagel | 5000 meters | 3rd | |
| Women's | 2005 Outdoor | Annie Bersagel | 10,000 meters | 6th | |
| Women's | 2006 Outdoor | Michelle Sikes | 5000 meters | 5th | |
| Men's | 2007 Indoor | Michael Bingham | 400 meters | 4th | |
| Women's | 2007 Indoor | Michelle Sikes | 3000 meters | 4th | |
| Women's | 2007 Indoor | Michelle Sikes | 5000 meters | 3rd | |
| Men's | 2007 Outdoor | Michael Bingham | 400 meters | 5th | |
| Women's | 2007 Outdoor | Michelle Sikes | 5000 meters | 1st | |
| Men's | 2009 Indoor | Michael Bingham | 400 meters | 1st | |
| Men's | 2009 Outdoor | Michael Bingham | 400 meters | 2nd | |
| Women's | 2011 Indoor | Anna Nosenko | 3000 meters | 6th | |
| Women's | 2011 Indoor | Anna Nosenko | 5000 meters | 4th | |
| Men's | 2015 Outdoor | Kyle Graves | 1500 meters | 6th | |
| Women's | 2015 Outdoor | Jessie Merckle | Javelin throw | 7th | |
| Men's | 2016 Indoor | Robert Heppenstall | 800 meters | 5th | |
| Men's | 2016 Outdoor | Robert Heppenstall | 800 meters | 8th | |
| Men's | 2017 Indoor | Robert Heppenstall | 800 meters | 5th | |
| Men's | 2017 Outdoor | Robert Heppenstall | 800 meters | 4th | |
| Women's | 2017 Outdoor | Ellie Abrahamson | 3000 meters steeplechase | 7th | |
| Men's | 2018 Indoor | Robert Heppenstall | 800 meters | 3rd | |
| Men's | 2018 Outdoor | Robert Heppenstall | 800 meters | 8th | |
| Men's | 2019 Indoor | Robert Heppenstall | 800 meters | 3rd | |
| Men's | 2022 Outdoor | Thomas Vanoppen | 1500 meters | 4th | |
| Men's | 2023 Outdoor | Luke Tewalt | 5000 meters | 4th | |
| Men's | 2024 Indoor | Thomas Kitchell | Shot put | 5th | |

== See also ==
- Category:Wake Forest Demon Deacons men's track and field athletes (8)
- Category:Wake Forest Demon Deacons women's track and field athletes (4)
