= 2012 World Junior Championships in Athletics – Men's 800 metres =

The men's 800 metres at the 2012 World Junior Championships in Athletics was held at the Estadi Olímpic Lluís Companys on 13, 14, and 15 July.

== Medalists ==
Gold	Nigel Amos; Botswana
Silver	Timothy Kitum; Kenya
Bronze	Edwin Kiplagat Melly; Kenya

== Records ==
Prior to the competition, the existing world junior and championship records were as follows.

World Junior Record	Abubaker Kaki (SUD)	1:42.69	Oslo, Norway	6 June 2008
Championship Record	Benson Koech (KEN)	1:44.77	Seoul, South Korea	18 September 1992
World Junior Leading	Nigel Amos (BOT)	1:43.11	Mannheim, Germany	9 June 2012
Broken records during the 2012 World Junior Championships in Athletics
Championship Record	Nigel Amos (BOT)	1:43.79	Barcelona, Spain	15 July 2012

== Results ==
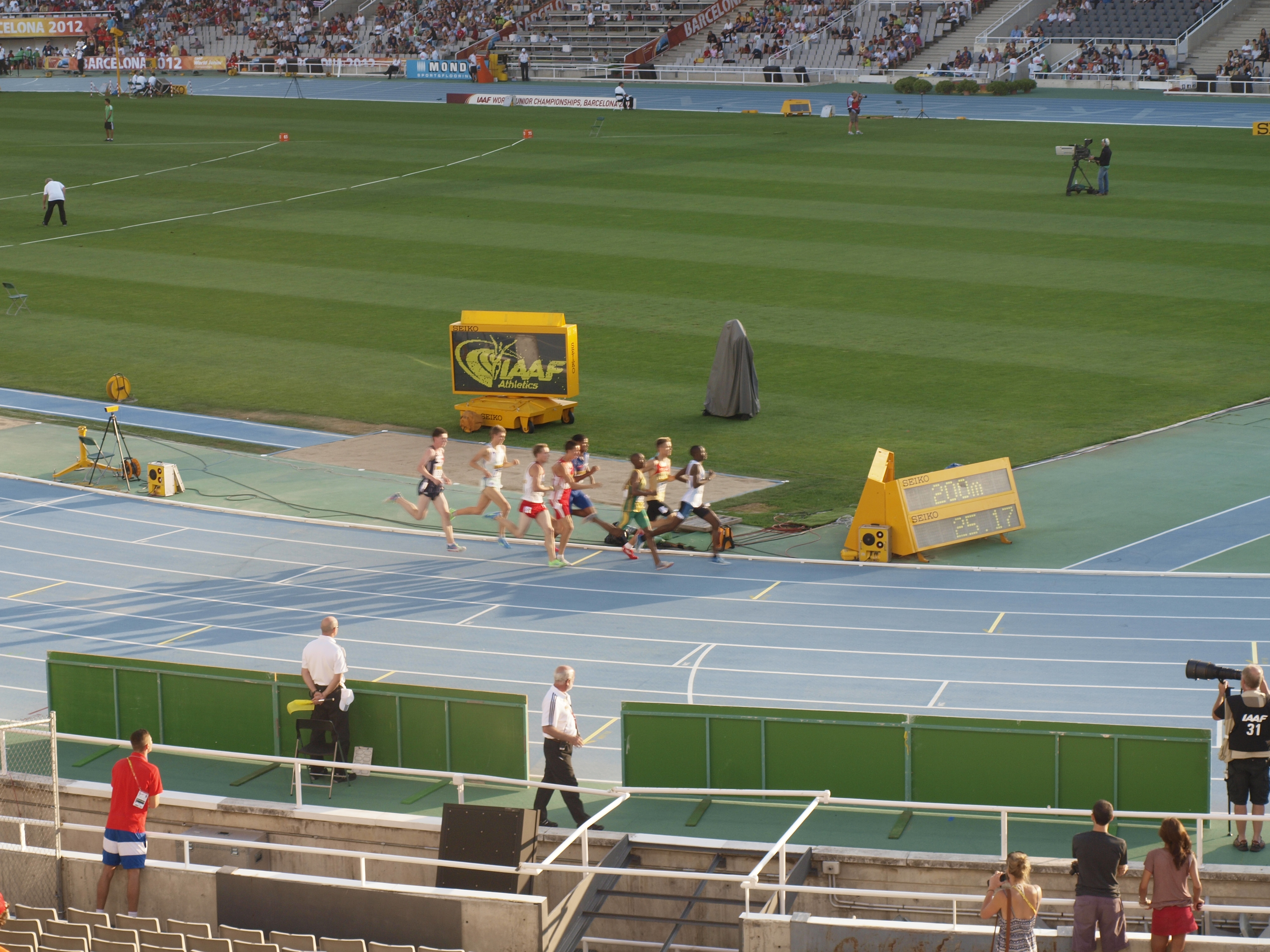
The field of the 800 metres

=== Heats ===
Qualification: The first 3 of each heat (Q) and the 3 fastest times (q) qualified

Rank	Heat	Lane	Name	Nationality	Time	Note
1	3	2	Jamal Hairane	Qatar	1:47.61	Q, PB
2	3	6	Jena Umar	Ethiopia	1:47.80	Q
3	4	4	Timothy Kitum	Kenya	1:47.96	Q
4	4	5	Mohamed Belbachir	Algeria	1:48.24	Q, PB
5	1	8	Edwin Kiplagat Melly	Kenya	1:48.27	Q, PB
6	2	1	Nijel Amos	Botswana	1:48.31	Q
7	3	5	Žan Rudolf	Slovenia	1:48.63	Q
8	2	6	Elnazeer Abdelgader	Sudan	1:48.66	Q, SB
9	1	2	Wesley Vazquez	Puerto Rico	1:48.78	Q
9	4	2	Tyler Smith	Canada	1:48.78	Q
11	3	4	Shaquille Dill	Bermuda	1:49.06	q, PB
12	2	2	Anthonio Mascoll	Barbados	1:49.31	Q
12	3	3	Nikolaus Franzmair	Austria	1:49.31	q, NJ
14	1	9	Ben Waterman	Great Britain	1:49.48	Q
15	2	5	Shaquille Walker	United States	1:49.55	q
16	1	4	Brad Mathas	New Zealand	1:49.73	
17	3	8	Joren Bouckaert	Belgium	1:49.74	
18	7	7	Brandon McBride	Canada	1:49.77	Q
19	7	6	Sho Kawamoto	Japan	1:50.12	Q
20	2	7	Johan Rogestedt	Sweden	1:50.25	
21	2	9	Daniel Andújar	Spain	1:50.30	
22	7	1	Kevin Stadler	Germany	1:50.39	Q
23	4	1	Sean Molloy	Great Britain	1:50.43	
24	6	8	Radouane Baaziri	Morocco	1:50.45	Q
24	1	1	Guilherme Pinto	Portugal	1:50.45	PB
26	6	4	Thapelo Madiba	South Africa	1:50.52	Q
27	6	9	Muayad Mohamed Ahmed	Qatar	1:50.57	Q
28	7	5	Oleksandr Shelest	Ukraine	1:50.70	PB
29	2	3	Filip Ingebrigtsen	Norway	1:50.74	
30	1	3	Tanner Sork	United States	1:50.80	
31	7	3	Víctor Emilio Ortiz	Costa Rica	1:51.01	
32	6	3	Brecht Bertels	Belgium	1:51.18	
33	3	9	Robert Lister	Australia	1:51.42	
34	7	4	Alejandro Peirano	Chile	1:51.45	
35	4	9	Ignacio Díaz-Cano	Spain	1:51.62	
36	5	3	Mark English	Ireland	1:51.74	Q
37	6	7	Mohamed Amine Layachi	Algeria	1:51.84	
38	5	7	Dennis Krüger	Germany	1:51.86	Q
39	7	9	Karl Griffin	Ireland	1:51.98	
40	6	2	Žan Kozan	Slovenia	1:52.01	
41	7	2	Soufiane El Kabbouri	Italy	1:52.11	
42	4	8	Valentin Voicu	Romania	1:52.18	
43	4	7	Christos Dimitriou	Cyprus	1:52.59	
44	7	8	Geabel Ali Al-Muradi	Yemen	1:52.73	PB
45	4	6	Alberto Mamba	Mozambique	1:52.91	
46	2	8	Mark London	Trinidad and Tobago	1:53.23	
47	1	6	Shota Kozuma	Japan	1:53.40	
48	5	1	Dominik Stadlmann	Austria	1:53.78	Q
49	5	8	Artur Kuciapski	Poland	1:53.95	
50	5	6	Joel Hogarth	Australia	1:53.98	
51	1	7	Roald H. Frøskeland	Norway	1:54.12	
52	6	6	Julian Oakley	New Zealand	1:54.74	
53	6	5	Nemanja Kojić	Serbia	1:54.79	
54	5	2	Jorge Collares	Uruguay	1:55.19	PB
55	3	7	Jacopo Lahbi	Italy	1:55.45	
56	2	4	Alex Beddoes	Cook Islands	1:58.30	NJ
57	5	5	Mohamed Ahmed Ismail	Sudan	1:58.65	
58	1	5	Agit Mutlu	Turkey	2:00.60	
59	4	3	Rondre Lewis	Belize	2:03.67	PB
	5	9	Fiker Belete	Ethiopia	DQ	
	5	4	Carlos Díaz	Chile	DNS	

=== Semi-final ===
Qualification: The first 2 of each heat (Q) and the 2 fastest times (q) qualified

Rank	Heat	Lane	Name	Nationality	Time	Note
1	3	8	Edwin Kiplagat Melly	Kenya	1:47.08	Q, PB
2	3	5	Wesley Vazquez	Puerto Rico	1:47.37	Q
3	3	6	Brandon McBride	Canada	1:47.69	q
4	3	7	Mark English	Ireland	1:47.77	q
5	3	4	Radouane Baaziri	Morocco	1:48.10	
6	2	5	Timothy Kitum	Kenya	1:49.09	Q
7	2	8	Mohamed Belbachir	Algeria	1:49.46	Q
8	1	7	Nijel Amos	Botswana	1:49.67	Q
9	2	4	Jena Umar	Ethiopia	1:49.68	
10	3	3	Nikolaus Franzmair	Austria	1:49.71	
11	3	2	Muayad Mohamed Ahmed	Qatar	1:49.79	
12	1	9	Dennis Krüger	Germany	1:49.89	Q
12	2	6	Jamal Hairane	Qatar	1:49.89	
14	1	5	Žan Rudolf	Slovenia	1:49.93	
15	2	7	Sho Kawamoto	Japan	1:50.17	
16	2	9	Elnazeer Abdelgader	Sudan	1:51.18	
17	2	2	Shaquille Walker	United States	1:51.43	
18	3	9	Anthonio Mascoll	Barbados	1:51.44	
19	1	2	Shaquille Dill	Bermuda	1:51.66	
20	2	3	Kevin Stadler	Germany	1:52.23	
21	1	3	Dominik Stadlmann	Austria	1:52.43	
22	1	6	Thapelo Madiba	South Africa	1:53.10	
23	1	8	Ben Waterman	Great Britain	1:53.78	
24	1	4	Tyler Smith	Canada	1:54.95	

=== Final ===
Rank	Lane	Name	Nationality	Time	Note
1st place, gold medalist(s)	6	Nijel Amos	Botswana	1:43.79	CR
2nd place, silver medalist(s)	5	Timothy Kitum	Kenya	1:44.56	
3rd place, bronze medalist(s)	4	Edwin Kiplagat Melly	Kenya	1:44.79	PB
4	7	Wesley Vazquez	Puerto Rico	1:45.29	NJ
5	3	Mark English	Ireland	1:46.02	
6	9	Brandon McBride	Canada	1:46.07	NJ
7	8	Mohamed Belbachir	Algeria	1:46.70	NJ
8	2	Dennis Krüger	Germany	1:46.92	PB

== Participation ==
According to an unofficial count, 60 athletes from 41 countries participated in the event.

- Algeria (2)
- Australia (2)
- Austria (2)
- Barbados (1)
- Belgium (2)
- Belize (1)
- Bermuda (1)
- Botswana (1)
- Canada (2)
- Chile (1)
- Cook Islands (1)
- Costa Rica (1)
- Cyprus (1)
- Ethiopia (2)
- Germany (2)
- Ireland (2)
- Italy (2)
- Japan (2)
- Kenya (2)
- Morocco (1)
- Mozambique (1)
- New Zealand (2)
- Norway (2)
- Poland (1)
- Portugal (1)
- Puerto Rico (1)
- Qatar (2)
- Romania (1)
- Serbia (1)
- Slovenia (2)
- South Africa (1)
- Spain (2)
- Sudan (2)
- Sweden (1)
- Trinidad and Tobago (1)
- Turkey (1)
- Ukraine (1)
- United Kingdom (2)
- United States (2)
- Uruguay (1)
- Yemen (1)
