= Athletics at the 2018 Commonwealth Games – Men's 800 metres =

Men's 800 metres at the 2018 Commonwealth Games
- Venue: Carrara Stadium
- Dates: 10 April (heats); 12 April (final)
- Competitors: 26 from 17 nations
- Winning time: 1:45.11

Medalists
gold medal	Wycliffe Kinyamal	Kenya
silver medal	Kyle Langford	England
bronze medal	Luke Mathews	Australia

The men's 800 metres at the 2018 Commonwealth Games, as part of the athletics programme, took place in the Carrara Stadium between 10 and 12 April 2018. The event was won by Wycliffe Kinyamal from Kenya as he finished ahead of the fast-finishing Kyle Langford who had come from sixth to second in the final straight.

== Records ==
Prior to this competition, the existing world and Games records were as follows:

World record	David Rudisha (KEN)	1:40.91	London, United Kingdom	9 August 2012
Games record	Steve Cram (ENG)	1:43.22	Edinburgh, Scotland	31 July 1986

== Schedule ==
The schedule was as follows:

Date	Time	Round
Tuesday 10 April 2018	10:30	First round
Thursday 12 April 2018	22:13	Final

All times are Australian Eastern Standard Time (UTC+10)

== Results ==
=== First round ===
The first round consisted of three heats. The two fastest competitors per heat (plus two fastest losers) advanced to the final.

Heat 1

Rank	Lane	Name	Result	Notes	Qual.
1	2	Wycliffe Kinyamal (KEN)	1:45.46		Q
2	8	Kyle Langford (ENG)	1:45.61		Q
3	1	Joseph Deng (AUS)	1:45.72		q
4	7	Brad Mathas (NZL)	1:46.32	PB	q
5	4	Akani Slater (SVG)	1:48.83	PB	
6	3	Guy Learmonth (SCO)	1:49.20		
7	7	Michael James (LCA)	1:51.89		
8	5	Elliott Dorey (JER)	1:52.60	SB	
9	6	Benedicto Makumba (MAW)	1:57.22	PB	

Heat 2

Rank	Lane	Name	Result	Notes	Qual.
1	8	Nijel Amos (BOT)	1:45.12		Q
2	5	Luke Mathews (AUS)	1:46.53		Q
3	6	Cornelius Tuwei (KEN)	1:47.10		
4	3	Christos Dimitriou (CYP)	1:47.82	PB	
5	2	Alberto Mamba (MOZ)	1:48.19	SB	
6	4	Elliot Giles (ENG)	1:48.54		
7	7	Alex Beddoes (COK)	1:51.64	NR	
8	1	Petero Veitaqomaki (FIJ)	1:54.22	PB	
9	7	Judah Corriette (DMA)	1:57.79		

Heat 3

Rank	Lane	Name	Result	Notes	Qual.
1	7	Jonathan Kitilit (KEN)	1:47.27		Q
2	8	Jake Wightman (SCO)	1:47.43		Q
3	3	Josh Ralph (AUS)	1:47.76		
4	6	Alex Amankwah (GHA)	1:47.80		
5	2	Andrew Osagie (ENG)	1:48.20		
6	5	Joseph Reid (IOM)	1:50.03		
7	1	Kasique Oliver (SVG)	1:51.55	SB	
–	4	Jenito Guezane (MOZ)	DQ	R 163.3a	

=== Final ===
The medals were determined in the final.

Rank	Lane	Name	Result	Notes
1	6	Wycliffe Kinyamal (KEN)	1:45.11	
2	3	Kyle Langford (ENG)	1:45.16	PB
3	1	Luke Mathews (AUS)	1:45.60	SB
4	8	Jake Wightman (SCO)	1:45.82	
5	2	Brad Mathas (NZL)	1:46.07	PB
6	5	Jonathan Kitilit (KEN)	1:46.12	
7	7	Joseph Deng (AUS)	1:47.20	
8	4	Nijel Amos (BOT)	1:48.45	
