= Jesús Tonatiú López =

Mexican middle-distance runner

Tonatiú López
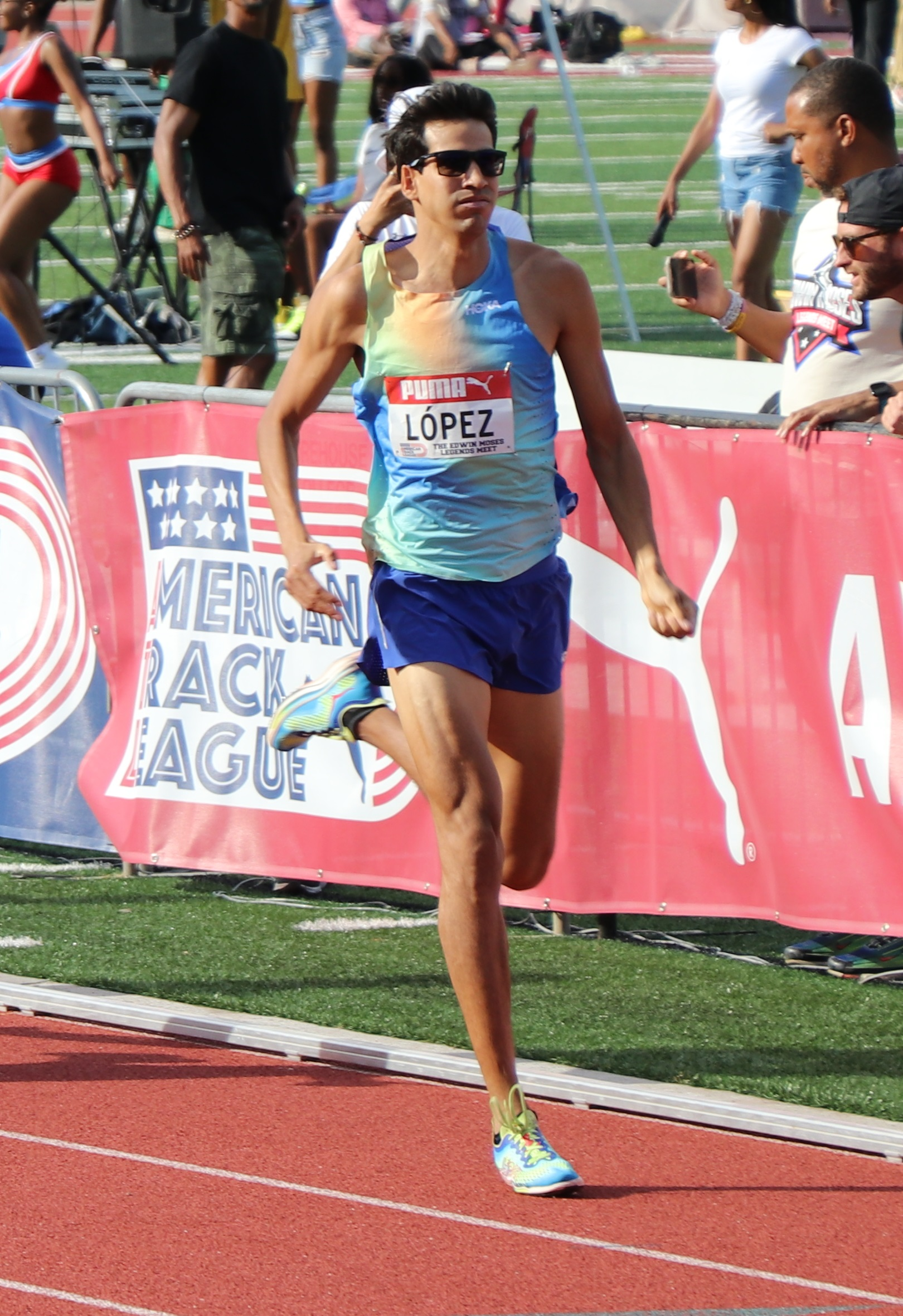
- López in 2024

Personal information
- Full name: Jesús Tonatiú López Álvarez
- Born: 2 August 1997 (age 29) Hermosillo, Mexico
- Education: University of Sonora

Sport
- Sport: Athletics
- Event: 800 metres
Medal record
Men's athletics
Representing Mexico
Pan American Games
Silver medal – second place	2023 Santiago	800 m
Summer Universiade
Gold medal – first place	2017 Taipei	800 m

Jesús Tonatiú López Álvarez (born 2 August 1997 in Hermosillo) is a Mexican middle-distance runner specialising in the 800 metres. He represented his country in the 800 metres at the 2017 World Championships without qualifying for the semifinals. Later that year he won the gold medal at the 2017 Summer Universiade.

He has qualified to represent Mexico at the 2020 Summer Olympics.

His personal best of 1:45.51 set in Culiacán in 2017 was the national record. In 2021, he eclipsed this record by clocking 1:43.44 in Atlanta, GA.

== International competitions ==
Year	Competition	Venue	Position	Event	Notes
Representing Mexico
2013	World Youth Championships	Donetsk, Ukraine	29th (h)	800 m	1:54.40
2014	World Junior Championships	Eugene, United States	40th (h)	800 m	1:52.59
2016	World U20 Championships	Bydgoszcz, Poland	4th	800 m	1:46.70
2017	IAAF World Relays	Nassau, Bahamas	5th	4 × 800 m relay	7:20.92
2017	World Championships	London, United Kingdom	22nd (h)	800 m	1:46.71
2017	Universiade	Taipei, Taiwan	1st	800 m	1:46.06
2018	Central American and Caribbean Games	Barranquilla, Colombia	1st	800 m	1:45.2
2019	NACAC U23 Championships	Querétaro City, Mexico	6th	800 m	1:55.87
2019	Pan American Games	Lima, Peru	–	800 m	DNF
2021	Olympic Games	Tokyo, Japan	12th (sf)	800 m	1:44.77
2022	World Championships	Eugene, United States	13th (sf)	800 m	1:46.17
2023	Central American and Caribbean Games	San Salvador, El Salvador	6th	800 m	1:50.71
2023	Pan American Games	Santiago, Chile	2nd	800 m	1:46.04
2024	Olympic Games	Paris, France	24th (sf)	800 m	1:50.38
2026	Central American and Caribbean Games	Santo Domingo, Dominican Republic	3rd	800 m	1:46.86

== Personal bests ==
Outdoor

- 400 metres – 46.69 (Monterrey 2017)
- 800 metres – 1:43.44 (Atlanta, Georgia 2021) NR
