= 2016 IAAF World U20 Championships – Men's 800 metres =

The men's 800 metres event at the 2016 IAAF World U20 Championships was held at Zdzisław Krzyszkowiak Stadium on 22, 23 and 24 July.

== Medalists ==
Gold	Kipyegon Bett; Kenya
Silver	Willy Tarbei; Kenya
Bronze	Mostafa Smaili; Morocco

== Records ==
Standing records prior to the 2016 IAAF World U20 Championships in Athletics
World Junior Record	Nijel Amos (BOT)	1:41.73	London, United Kingdom	9 August 2012
Championship Record	Nijel Amos (BOT)	1:43.79	Barcelona, Spain	15 July 2012
World Junior Leading	Donavan Brazier (USA)	1:43.55	Eugene, United States	10 June 2016

== Results ==
=== Heats ===
Qualification: First 4 of each heat (Q) and the 4 fastest times (q) qualified for the semifinals.

Rank	Heat	Name	Nationality	Time	Note
1	3	Riadh Chninni	Tunisia	1:48.40	Q
2	3	Teddese Lemi	Ethiopia	1:48.45	Q
3	3	Robert Heppenstall	Canada	1:48.69	Q
4	3	Lachlan Barber	Australia	1:48.82	Q
5	2	Willy Tarbei	Kenya	1:48.95	Q
6	3	Benediktas Mickus	Lithuania	1:49.05	q
7	2	Ayoub Sniba	Morocco	1:49.20	Q
8	2	Gorata Gabankitse	Botswana	1:49.29	Q
9	3	Vincent Crisp	United States	1:49.32	q
10	5	James Preston	New Zealand	1:49.69	Q
11	2	Ignacio Fontes	Spain	1:49.69	Q
12	1	Mostafa Smaili	Morocco	1:49.82	Q
13	5	Ryan Sánchez	Puerto Rico	1:49.97	Q
14	2	Pascal Kleyer	Germany	1:50.18	q
15	1	Andreas Kramer	Sweden	1:50.19	Q
16	5	Jesús Tonatiu López	Mexico	1:50.33	Q
17	1	George Kusche	South Africa	1:50.40	Q
18	5	Daniel Rowden	Great Britain	1:50.69	Q
19	5	Michael Petersen	Canada	1:50.77	q
19	4	Kipyegon Bett	Kenya	1:50.82	Q
20	1	Bacha Morka	Ethiopia	1:50.88	Q
21	2	Mateusz Borkowski	Poland	1:50.93	
23	4	Brian Bell	United States	1:50.97	Q
24	5	Andriy Aliksiychuk	Ukraine	1:51.39	
25	1	Beant Singh	India	1:51.73	
26	4	Joseph Deng	Australia	1:51.77	Q
27	4	Dennis Biederbick	Germany	1:52.03	Q
28	1	Ramazan Barbaros	Turkey	1:52.42	
29	4	Spencer Thomas	Great Britain	1:52.54	
30	4	Markus Einan	Norway	1:53.61	
31	1	Bilal Bilano	Indonesia	1:54.26	PB
32	2	Gabriele Aquaro	Italy	1:55.92	
33	4	Justice Dreischor	Aruba	1:57.74	

=== Semifinals ===
Qualification: First 2 of each heat (Q) and the 2 fastest times (q) qualified for the final.

Rank	Heat	Name	Nationality	Time	Note
1	3	Kipyegon Bett	Kenya	1:46.37	Q
2	1	Mostafa Smaili	Morocco	1:46.51	Q
3	1	Riadh Chninni	Tunisia	1:47.11	Q, NU20R
4	1	Robert Heppenstall	Canada	1:47.13	q
5	3	Jesús Tonatiu López	Mexico	1:47.25	Q
6	1	Brian Bell	United States	1:47.49	q
7	3	George Kusche	South Africa	1:47.53	
8	3	Teddese Lemi	Ethiopia	1:47.53	PB
9	1	Andreas Kramer	Sweden	1:47.65	PB
10	1	Dennis Biederbick	Germany	1:47.70	PB
11	1	James Preston	New Zealand	1:48.06	NU20R
12	2	Willy Tarbei	Kenya	1:48.27	Q
13	2	Gorata Gabankitse	Botswana	1:48.31	Q, PB
14	2	Joseph Deng	Australia	1:48.49	
15	2	Vincent Crisp	United States	1:48.63	
16	2	Ignacio Fontes	Spain	1:48.88	
17	3	Lachlan Barber	Australia	1:48.91	
18	2	Ryan Sánchez	Puerto Rico	1:49.43	
19	3	Benediktas Mickus	Lithuania	1:49.44	
20	3	Daniel Rowden	Great Britain	1:49.58	
21	2	Pascal Kleyer	Germany	1:49.84	
22	1	Bacha Morka	Ethiopia	1:51.27	
23	2	Michael Petersen	Canada	1:51.76	
24	3	Ayoub Sniba	Morocco	1:53.86	

=== Final ===
Rank	Name	Nationality	Time	Note
1st place, gold medalist(s)	Kipyegon Bett	Kenya	1:44.95	SB
2nd place, silver medalist(s)	Willy Tarbei	Kenya	1:45.50	
3rd place, bronze medalist(s)	Mostafa Smaili	Morocco	1:46.02	
4	Jesús Tonatiu López	Mexico	1:46.70	
5	Robert Heppenstall	Canada	1:47.33	
6	Riadh Chninni	Tunisia	1:47.38	
7	Brian Bell	United States	1:47.68	
8	Gorata Gabankitse	Botswana	1:48.40	
