= Kyle Langford (runner) =

British middle-distance runner

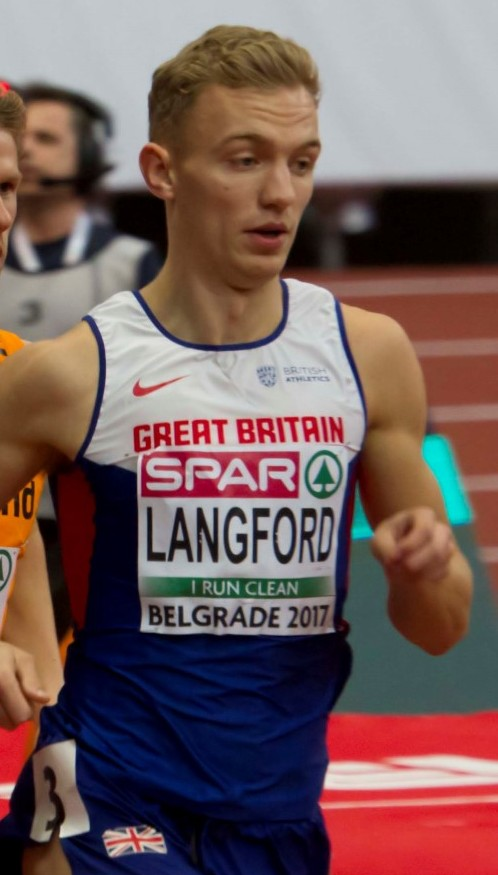

Personal information
- Nationality: British (English)
- Born: 2 February 1996 (age 30) Watford, England
- Height: 1.82 m (6 ft 0 in)
- Weight: 72 kg (159 lb)

Sport
- Sport: Track and field
- Event: 800 metres
- Club: Watford Harriers

Achievements and titles
- Personal best: 800 m: 1:44.49 Rovereto 2022
Medal record
Representing England
Men's athletics
Commonwealth Games
Silver medal – second place	2018 Gold Coast	800 m

Kyle Langford (born 2 February 1996) is a British middle-distance runner competing primarily in the 800 metres. He won a silver medal at the 2018 Commonwealth Games.

== Biography ==
Langford won a bronze medal at the 2013 World Youth Championships and was the 2015 European Junior Champion and represented his country at the 2015 World Championships.

Langford became the British 800 metres champion after winning the 2015 British Athletics Championships.

At the 2017 World Championships in London he was placed 4th, narrowly missing out on a bronze medal. He represented England at the 2018 Commonwealth Games in Gold Coast, where he won a silver medal in the 800 metres.

In August 2022 he set his personal best time of 1.44.49 winning in Rovereto. He was a semi-finalist at the 2022 World Athletics Championships in Eugene.

== Competition record ==
Year	Competition	Venue	Position	Event	Notes
Representing Great Britain and England
2013	World Youth Championships	Donetsk, Ukraine	3rd	800 m	1:48.32
2014	World Junior Championships	Eugene, United States	8th	800 m	1:55.21
2015	European Junior Championships	Eskilstuna, Sweden	1st	800 m	1:48.99
2015	World Championships	Beijing, China	41st (h)	800 m	1:49.78
2017	European Indoor Championships	Belgrade, Serbia	4th (sf)	800 m	1:49.23
2017	World Championships	London, United Kingdom	4th	800 m	1:45.25
2018	Commonwealth Games	Gold Coast, Australia	2nd	800 m	1:45.16
2019	World Championships	Doha, Qatar	19th (sf)	800 m	1:46.41
2022	World Championships	Eugene, United States	11th (sf)	800 m	1:45.91

== Personal bests ==
Outdoor

- 800 metres – 1:44.49 Rovereto 2022
- 1500 metres – 3:52.06 (Hendon 2013)

Indoor

- 800 metres – 1:46.79 (Birmingham 2017)
