= John Rivera (runner) =

Puerto Rican middle-distance runner

Personal information
- Born: December 2, 1998 (age 27)

Sport
- Sport: Track and field
- Event: 800 metres

John Rivera (born 2 December 1998) is a Puerto Rican middle-distance runner.

== Early life ==
He attended Lakewood Ranch High School and the University of Mississippi between 2018 and 2022.

== Career ==
In 2021, he finished second in 1:50.18 at the Southeastern Conference Indoor Championships in the 800 metres, and 14th in 1:48.45 at the NCAA Division I Outdoor Championships. In 2022, he placed third in 800 metres at the NCAA Division 1 Indoor Championships in 1:48.03.

He ran at the 2023 World Athletics Championships in Budapest. He finished fourth in the 800 metres running for Puerto Rico at the 2023 Pan American Games in Santiago.

He represented Puerto Rico at the 2024 World Athletics Indoor Championships in Glasgow. In January 2025, he joined the Brooks Beasts Track Club. He competed at the 2025 World Athletics Indoor Championships in Nanjing, qualifying for the semi-finals.
