= Wake Forest Demon Deacons =

Intercollegiate athletics teams of Wake Forest University

- University: Wake Forest University
- Nickname: Demon Deacons
- NCAA: Division I (FBS)
- Conference: Atlantic Coast Conference
- Athletic director: John Currie
- Location: Winston-Salem, North Carolina
- Varsity teams: 18
- Football stadium: Allegacy Federal Credit Union Stadium
- Basketball arena: Lawrence Joel Veterans Memorial Coliseum
- Baseball stadium: David F. Couch Ballpark
- Soccer stadium: Spry Soccer Stadium
- Colors: Old gold and black
- Mascot: Demon Deacon
- Fight song: O Here's to Wake Forest
- Website: godeacs.com

The Atlantic Coast Conference logo in Wake Forest's colors

The Wake Forest Demon Deacons are the intercollegiate athletic teams that represent Wake Forest University, located in Winston-Salem, North Carolina. They compete at the National Collegiate Athletic Association (NCAA) Division I level as a member of the Atlantic Coast Conference (ACC).

Wake Forest has won a total of 11 national championships in six different sports; six of these championships have come since 2002. Wake Forest is sometimes referred to as being a part of "Tobacco Road" or "The Big Four", terms that refer to the four North Carolina schools that compete heatedly against each other within the ACC; these include Duke University, North Carolina, and North Carolina State, as well as Wake Forest.

Originally, Wake Forest's athletic teams were known as The Old Gold and Black or the Baptists, due to its association with the Baptist Convention (from which it later separated itself). However, in 1923, after a particularly impressive win against Trinity College (predecessor of Duke University) a newspaper reporter wrote that the Deacons "fought like Demons", giving rise to the current team name, the "Demon Deacons". The name also refers to the Christian office of deacon, again referring to Wake Forest's status as a Baptist university until the 1980s.

The Athletics Director was Ron Wellman, who won multiple Athletic Director of the Year Awards for his work during the 2007–2008 school year. In 2019, Wellman announced his retirement, effective May 1, 2019. On March 2, 2019, Wake Forest named alum John Currie as its new athletics director, and later promoted to vice president in July 2024.

== Sports sponsored ==
Men's sports	Women's sports
Baseball	Basketball
Basketball	Cross country
Cross country	Field hockey
Football	Golf
Golf	Soccer
Soccer	Tennis
Tennis	Track and field^{†}
Track and field^{†}	Volleyball
† – Track and field includes both indoor and outdoor.

=== Football ===
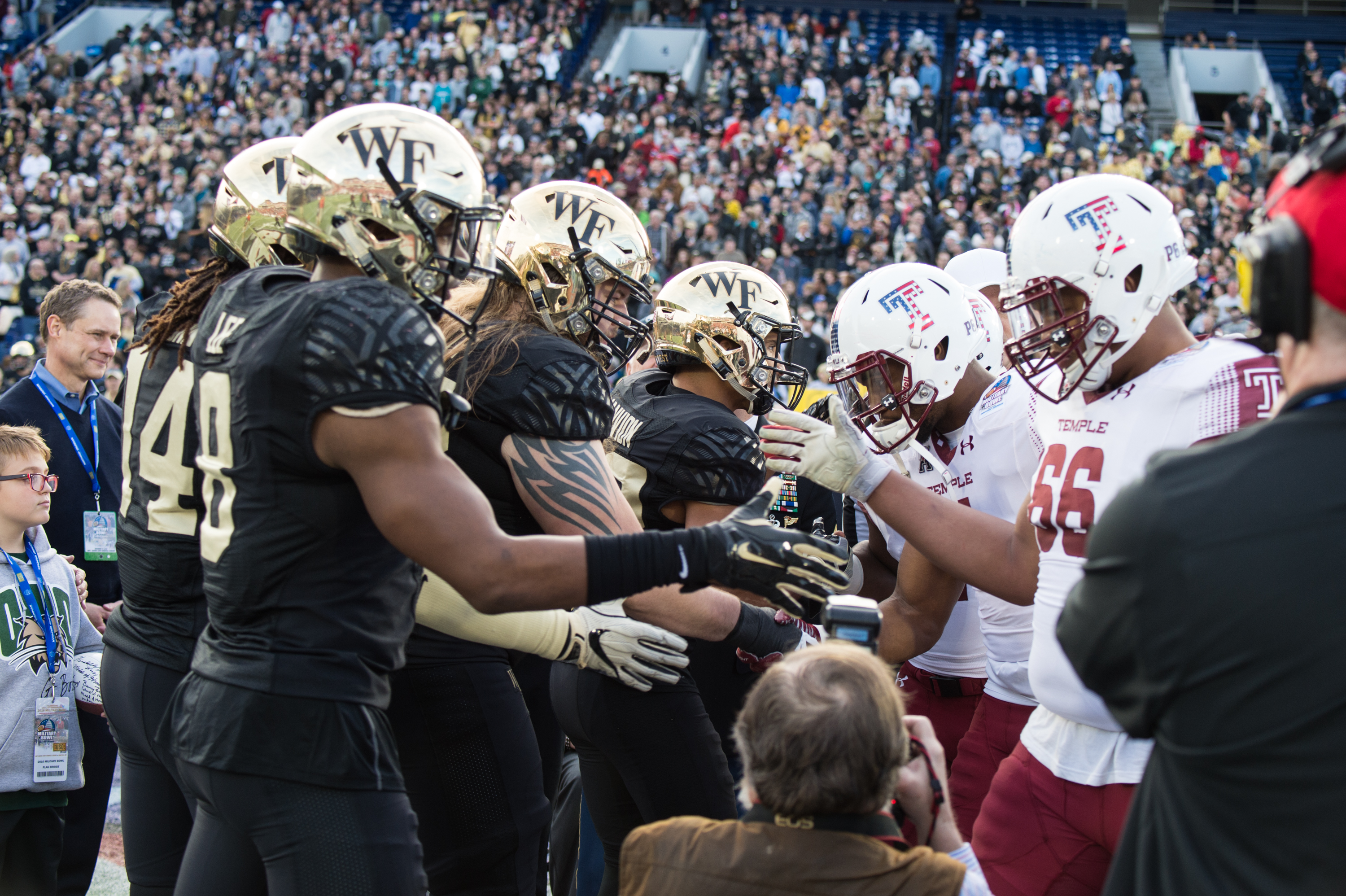
Demon Deacons players at the 2016 Military Bowl

Wake Forest's football team was ranked in the Top 25 in the nation by the AP Poll during most of the 2006 season. They won the 2006 ACC Atlantic Division Title and the 2006 ACC Conference Championship by defeating the Georgia Tech Yellow Jackets 9–6 on December 2 in the ACC Championship Game in Jacksonville, Florida. The win sent Wake Forest to the Orange Bowl to play Big East champion Louisville, where they lost to the Cardinals. This made Wake Forest the smallest school to ever compete in the Bowl Championship Series. Of all schools that play Division I FBS football, only Rice and Tulsa have smaller undergraduate enrollments, and Wake has the smallest undergraduate enrollment of any school in the Power Five conferences.

For his part in the record-setting season, coach Jim Grobe was unanimously selected ACC Coach of the Year, and handily won the AP Coach of the Year award several weeks later. Coach Grobe signed a ten-year contract in 2007.

Wake Forest followed its success in 2006 with another excellent year and finished the regular season with a record of 8 wins and 4 losses. During the season, the Demon Deacons were briefly ranked in the Top 25. Their success throughout the year earned Wake Forest an invitation to the Meineke Car Care Bowl in Charlotte, North Carolina. Played on December 29 in the Bank of America stadium (home of the Carolina Panthers) the Demon Deacons defeated the Connecticut Huskies 24–10.

Wake Forest plays its home football games at Allegacy Federal Credit Union Stadium (formerly Groves Stadium).

=== Basketball ===
==== Men's basketball ====
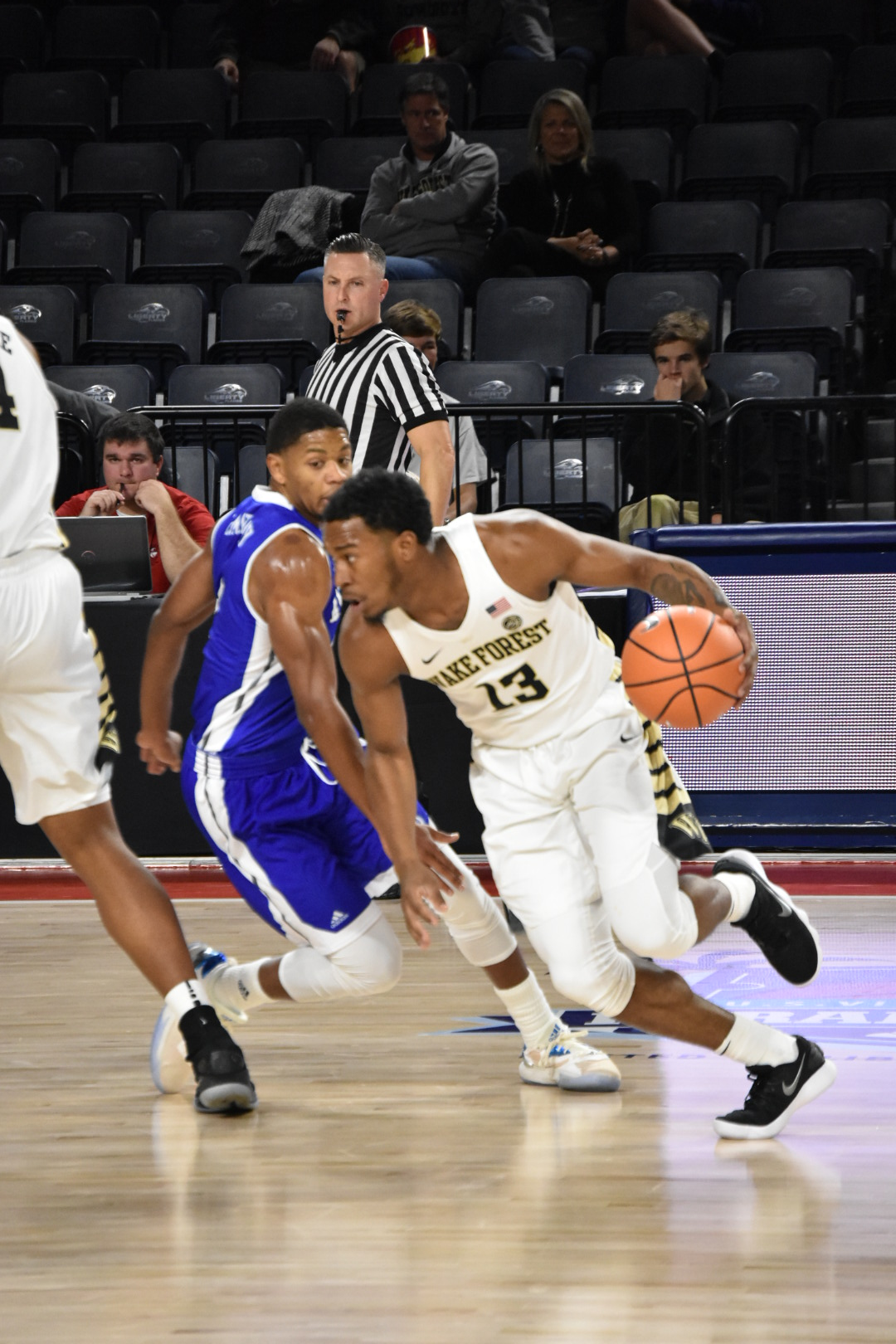
Wake Forest (in white) v Drake in 2017

Wake Forest is generally regarded as a competitive program in men's basketball, frequently qualifying for the NCAA Men's Division I Basketball Championship (20 times in the school's history). The men's basketball team has made 16 straight postseason appearances (through their NIT appearance in 2006), the longest such streak in the ACC. They reached the Final Four once, in 1962. The school's famous basketball alumni include Billy Packer, a guard on the 1962 Final Four team who became far more famous as a basketball broadcaster; "Muggsy" Bogues, the shortest player ever to play in the NBA; Randolph Childress, for his MVP performance in the 1995 ACC Tournament; Dallas Mavericks star Josh Howard; 2006 NBA Rookie of the Year Award winner and Phoenix Suns star Chris Paul; and two-time league MVP, three-time NBA Finals MVP and five-time NBA Champion, San Antonio Spurs forward Tim Duncan.

Lawrence Joel Veterans Memorial Coliseum is the home venue for the Demon Deacons basketball team. Skip Prosser, Wake Forest University's men's basketball coach since 2001, died in Winston-Salem on July 26, 2007. One of Prosser's assistant coaches, Dino Gaudio, was named to replace him. After the firing of Dino Guadio at the end of the 2010 season, Wake Forest hired Jeff Bzdelik as their head basketball coach. Jeff Bzdelik resigned as head basketball coach on March 20, 2014. Steve Forbes is now the head coach of Wake Forest.

==== Women's basketball ====
The women's team have played since 1971, and they have been to the NCAA Tournament just twice, in 1988 and 2021. They have reached the ACC Tournament semifinals in 1986, 1988, and 2012.

=== Women's field hockey ===
Recent athletic honors include three consecutive NCAA Field Hockey national championships in 2002, 2003, and 2004 under Head Coach Jennifer Averill. In 2005, the Deacs were defeated in the semifinal round by Duke University, in the 2006 championship game by the University of Maryland, and in the 2018 semifinal round by North Carolina. The Deacs have contended for the National Championship 18 times, the most recent in 2022. Other championships include the 2002, 2003, 2006, and 2014 ACC Tournament championships.

=== Golf ===
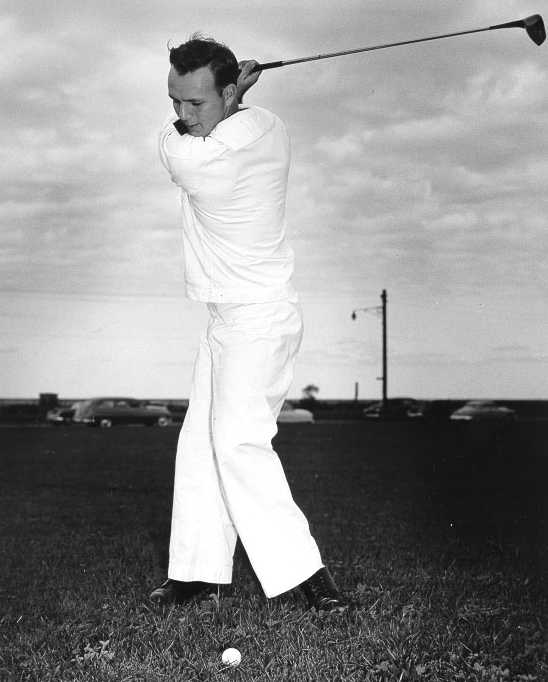
Arnold Palmer

The men's golf team has had several successful years, winning national championships in 1974, 1975, and 1986. The team also finished as national runner-ups on four other occasions in 1969, 1970, 1987, 1997. Three Demon Deacons have won the individual national title: Curtis Strange in 1974, Jay Haas in 1975, and Gary Hallberg in 1979. Since the NCAA went to pre-national championship regional competitions in 1989, Wake Forest has won three regionals: 2005 (East), 2006 (East), and 2008 (Central).

They have won 20 conference championships:

- Southern Conference (1): 1950
- Atlantic Coast Conference (19): 1955, 1957–58, 1963, 1967–76, 1978–80, 1989, 2022

The women's golf team has had some success as well. They won 6 ACC team championships in 1986, 1994, 1995, 2009, 2010, and 2022. They have also won 7 ACC individual championships in 1986, 1993, 1995, 1998, 2009, 2010, and 2011. In the NCAA regionals, they had won their region twice, 1994 (East) and 1995 (East). Jennifer Kupcho won the individual national title in 2018 and the Augusta National Women's Amateur in 2019. Wake Forest advanced to the NCAA Division I Women's Golf Championship six straight years, 2018–2024 (no championship held in 2020 due to COVID-19), finishing as runner-up to Duke in 2018, then winning their first national title in 2023, defeating the University of Southern California in the NCAA Championship match play finals.

Several well-known players include Arnold Palmer, Lanny Wadkins, Jay Haas, Billy Andrade, Bill Haas, Curtis Strange, Robert Wrenn, Scott Hoch, Webb Simpson, Will Zalatoris, and Grayson Murray.

=== Soccer ===
Wake Forest is a consistent national title contender in men's soccer. In recent years several players from the program have played professionally in Major League Soccer, including Brian Carroll, Will Hesmer, Brian Edwards, Michael Lahoud, Michael Parkhurst, James Riley, Scott Sealy, Sam Cronin, and Wells Thompson. In 2006 the team advanced to the final four of the NCAA tournament where they were defeated in a penalty kick shootout by the University of California, Santa Barbara. They captured the 2007 NCAA Division I Men's Soccer Championship defeating Ohio State.

=== Tennis ===
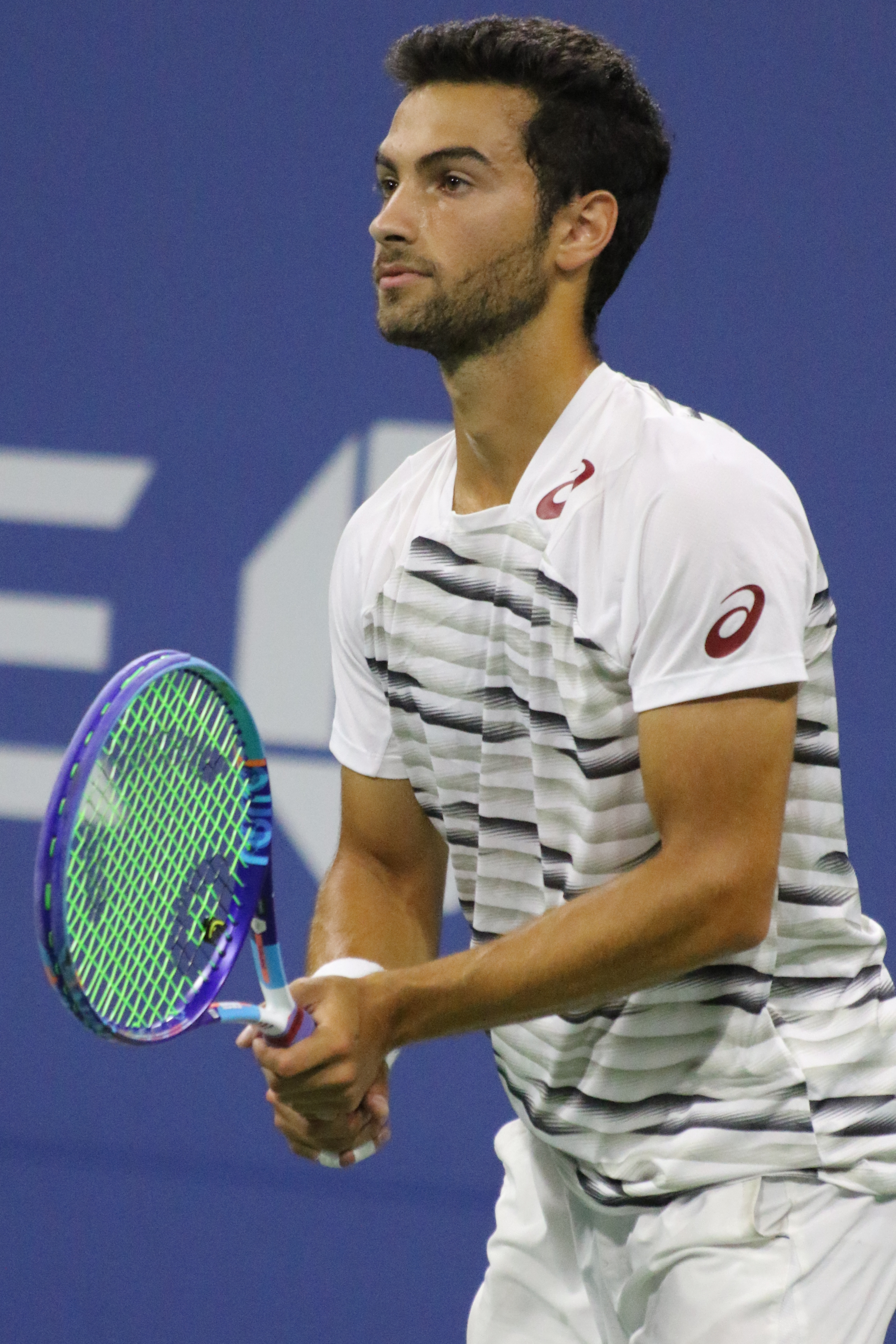
Noah Rubin

Noah Rubin played for Wake Forest; he had won the 2014 boys singles championship at Wimbledon, and the US 2014 boys' national championships in singles and doubles. In 2014-15 for Wake Forest he was an All-American and the runner-up in the 2015 NCAA singles championship.

In 2018, Wake Forest won the ITA National Team Indoor Tennis Championship over UCLA, 4–2. The Demon Deacons would go on to win the 2018 NCAA National Championship over Ohio State later in the season for a clean sweep of national titles.

In 2025, The Demon Deacons won their second ITA National Team Indoor Tennis Championship, defeating TCU 4–3. As in 2018, they would again sweep the year's national titles, beating TCU once again in the NCAA National Championship, 4–2.

=== Women's volleyball ===
Women's volleyball is a varsity sport at Wake Forest. The team is part of the Atlantic Coast Conference (ACC). In March 2019 head volleyball coach Bill Ferguson was indicted and charged with racketeering as part of the 2019 college admissions bribery scandal, in which he is accused of accepting $100,000 to help a student get into Wake Forest illegally as a purported volleyball recruit. The university placed Ferguson on administrative leave. He later resign in August 2019.

=== Baseball ===
Wake Forest won the 1955 College World Series in baseball. In 2023, the Deacons reached No. 1 in the Top 25 national rankings and won the ACC regular-season title.

== Championships ==
=== NCAA team championships ===
Wake Forest has won 11 NCAA team national championships.

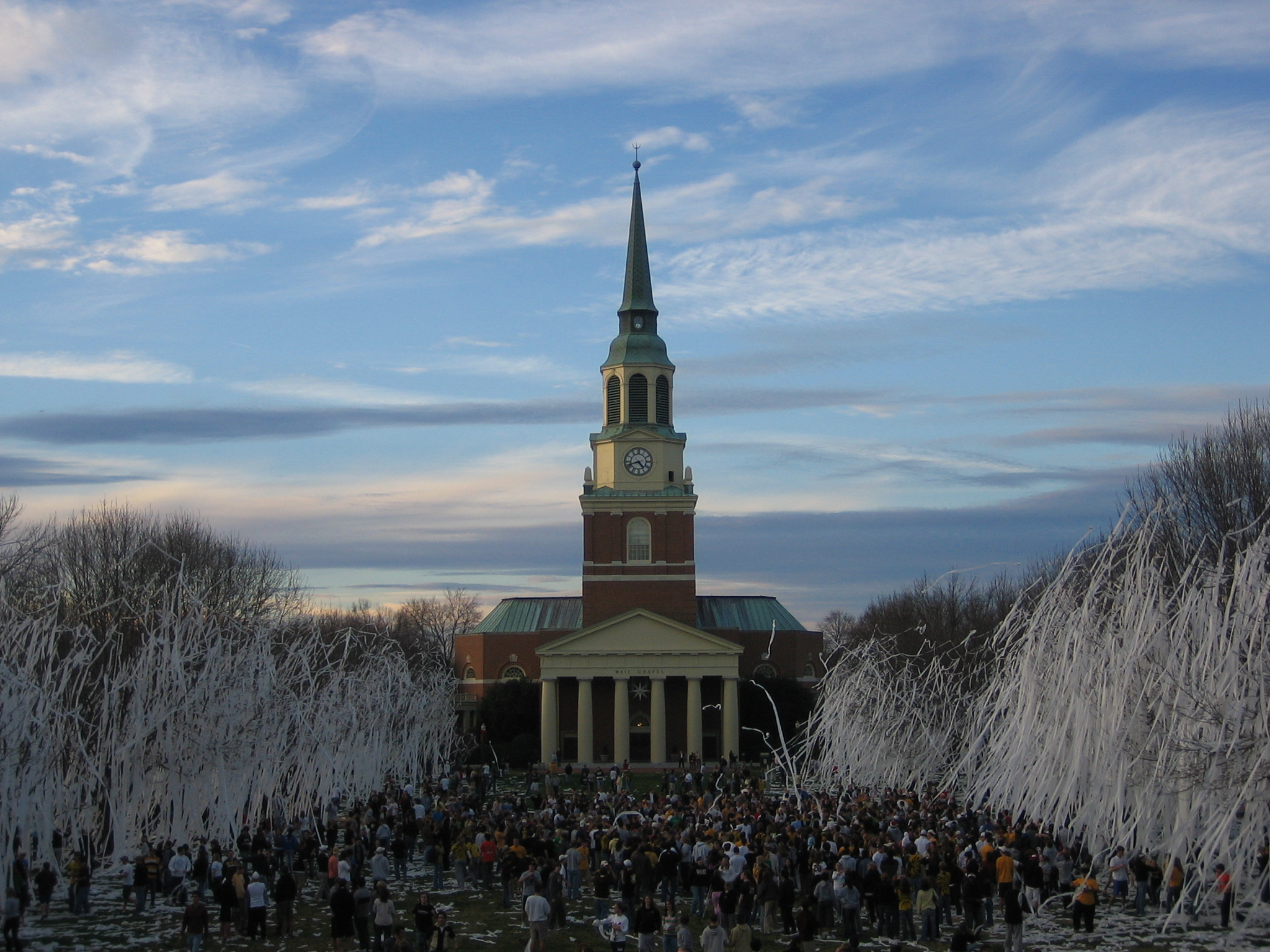
"Rolling the Quad" is a WFU tradition that is done after major victories in athletic competition

- Men's (7)
  - Baseball (1): 1955
  - Golf (3): 1974, 1975, 1986
  - Soccer (1): 2007
  - Tennis (2): 2018, 2025
- Women's (4)
  - Field Hockey (3): 2002, 2003, 2004
  - Golf (1): 2023
- see also:
  - ACC NCAA team championships
  - List of NCAA schools with the most NCAA Division I championships

=== NCAA individual championships ===
- Men's
  - Golf (3): Curtis Strange (1974), Jay Haas (1975), Gary Hallberg (1979)
  - Outdoor track & field (2): Andy Bloom (1996 shot put & 1996 discus throw)
  - Indoor track & field (1): Michael Bingham (2009 400m)
  - Tennis (1): Petros Chrysochos (2018)
- Women's
  - Tennis (1): Bea Bielik (2002)
  - Outdoor track & field (1): Michelle Sikes (2007 5000m)
  - Golf (1): Jennifer Kupcho (2018)

== ACC Athlete of the Year ==
=== Male Athlete of the Year ===
Year	Athlete	Sport
1955	Dickie Hemric	Basketball
1962	Len Chappell	Basketball
1965	Brian Piccolo	Football
1995	Randolph Childress	Basketball
1997	Tim Duncan	Basketball
2023	Rhett Lowder	Baseball

=== Female Athlete of the Year ===
Year	Athlete	Sport
2002	Bea Bielik	Tennis
2005	Kelly Dostal	Field Hockey

== Screamin' Demons ==
Student attendance of Wake Forest football and basketball games was formerly high, in part due to the program known as "Screamin' Demons". At the beginning of each respective athletic season students on the Reynolda Campus could sign up for the program whereby they pay $15 for each season; in addition to the slightly better seats than the other students in football (not enforced) and seats behind the rim in basketball, this gets students a football shirt in the fall and a tie-dye T-shirt in the spring along with a card that serves as an automatic pass to the sporting events. They lose this privilege if they miss two of the games. Most students sign up because ticket distribution to non-Screamin' Demons is unreliable. Through the planning of Sports Marketing and the Screamin' Demons program, basketball game seats in the students section are difficult to attain without participating in the Screamin' Demons program. In 2011, sports marketing lowered the student allotment, and very few students currently attend.

Now, the Screaming Deacons app operates as a way for students to receive their free tickets to Wake Forest sporting events, with students earning rewards points for attendance at games. These points can be exchanged for prizes.
