= Abdelati El Guesse =

Moroccan middle-distance runner

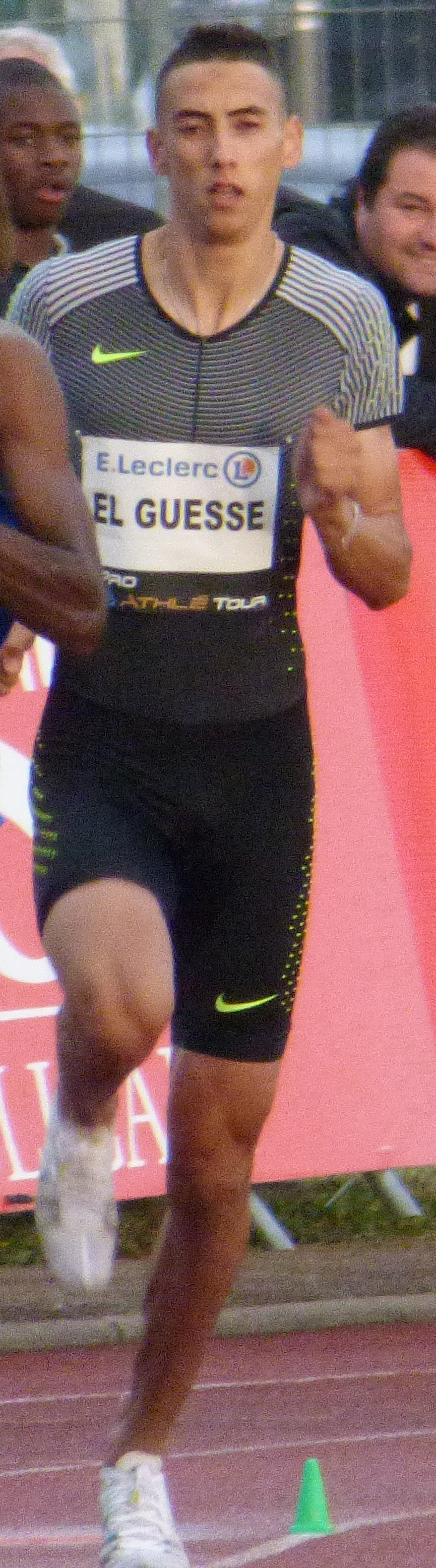
- El Guesse in 2017

Personal information
- Born: 27 February 1993 (age 33)
- Education: Cadi Ayyad University
- Height: 1.87 m (6 ft 2 in)
- Weight: 64 kg (141 lb)

Sport
- Sport: Track and field
- Event: 800 metres
- Updated on 29 August 2015

Abdelati El Guesse (born 27 February 1993) is a Moroccan middle-distance runner competing primarily in the 800 metres. He represented his country at the 2015 World Championships in Beijing without advancing from the first round. He won the silver medal at the 2015 Summer Universiade.

At the 2020 Summer Olympics, he competed in the men's 800 metres event.

His personal best in the event is 1:44.84, set in Tokyo in 2021.

== Competition record ==
Year	Competition	Venue	Position	Event	Notes
Representing Morocco
2015	Universiade	Gwangju, South Korea	2nd	800 m	1:49.29
2015	World Championships	Beijing, China	19th (h)	800 m	1:47.49
2016	Olympic Games	Rio de Janeiro, Brazil	–	800 m	DNF
2017	World Championships	London, United Kingdom	23rd (h)	800 m	1:46.74
2021	Olympic Games	Tokyo, Japan	20th (sf)	800 m	1:46.85
2022	World Indoor Championships	Belgrade, Serbia	25th (h)	1500 m	3:47.43
2022	African Championships	Port Louis, Mauritius	19th (h)	800 m	1:51.55
2022	Mediterranean Games	Oran, Algeria	7th	800 m	1:46.28
2022	World Championships	Eugene, United States	18th (sf)	800 m	1:46.46
2023	Arab Championships	Marrakesh, Morocco	1st	800 m	1:46.44
2023	World Championships	Budapest, Hungary	14th (sf)	800 m	1:44.55
2024	World Indoor Championships	Glasgow, United Kingdom	4th (sf)	800 m	1:45.45
2024	Olympic Games	Paris, France	39th (h)	800 m	1:46.91
2025	World Indoor Championships	Nanjing, China	23rd (h)	800 m	1:49.83
2025	World Championships	Tokyo, Japan	46th (h)	800 m	1:46.80
