= Jena Umar =

Ethiopian middle-distance runner

Personal information
- Full name: Jena Umar Mohamed
- Born: 24 December 1995 (age 30)

Sport
- Sport: Track and field
- Event: 800 metres
- Updated on 29 August 2015

Jena Umar Mohamed (born 24 December 1995) is a male Ethiopian middle-distance runner competing primarily in the 800 metres. He represented his country at the 2015 World Championships in Beijing reaching the semifinals.

His personal bests in the event are 1:46.07 outdoors (Montbéliard 2015) and 1:49.06 indoors (Mondeville 2015).

== Competition record ==
Year	Competition	Venue	Position	Event	Notes
Representing Ethiopia
2012	World Junior Championships	Barcelona, Spain	9th (sf)	800 m	1:49.68
2013	African Junior Championships	Bambous, Mauritius	6th	800 m	1:51.79
2014	World Junior Championships	Eugene, United States	5th	800 m	1:46.23
2014	African Championships	Marrakech	8th	800 m	1:47.09
2015	World Championships	Beijing, China	20th (sf)	800 m	1:48.68
