= Jelssin Robledo =

Colombian middle-distance runner

Personal information
- Full name: Jelssin Donnovan Robledo Mena
- Born: November 3, 1995 (age 30)

Sport
- Sport: Athletics
- Events: 800 metres; 4 × 400 metres relay
Medal record
Representing Colombia
Men's athletics
| Event | 1st | 2nd | 3rd |
|---|---|---|---|
| South American Games | 1 | 1 | 0 |
| South American Championships | 0 | 1 | 0 |
| Bolivarian Games | 3 | 0 | 1 |
| South American U23 Championships | 0 | 1 | 0 |
| Total | 4 | 3 | 1 |
South American Games
| Gold medal – first place | 2018 Cochabamba | 4×400 m relay |
| Silver medal – second place | 2018 Cochabamba | 800 m |
South American Championships
| Silver medal – second place | 2019 Lima | 800 m |
Bolivarian Games
| Gold medal – first place | 2017 Santa Marta | 4×400 m relay |
| Gold medal – first place | 2022 Valledupar | 800 m |
| Gold medal – first place | 2022 Valledupar | 4×400 m relay |
| Bronze medal – third place | 2017 Santa Marta | 800 m |
South American U23 Championships
| Silver medal – second place | 2016 Lima | 800 m |

Jelssin Donnovan Robledo Mena (born 3 November 1995) is a Colombian middle-distance runner specialising in the 800 metres. He won silver medals at the 2018 South American Games and 2019 South American Championships.

== International competitions ==
| Year | Competition | Venue | Position | Event | Notes |
Representing Colombia
| 2016 | South American U23 Championships | Lima, Peru | 2nd | 800 m | 1:48.85 |
| 2017 | South American Championships | Asunción, Paraguay | 4th | 800 m | 1:51.08 |
| 2017 | Bolivarian Games | Santa Marta, Colombia | 3rd | 800 m | 1:49.20 |
| 2017 | Bolivarian Games | Santa Marta, Colombia | 1st | 4 × 400 m relay | 3:06.14 |
| 2018 | South American Games | Cochabamba, Bolivia | 2nd | 800 m | 1:51.50 |
| 2018 | South American Games | Cochabamba, Bolivia | 1st | 4 × 400 m relay | 3:04.78 |
| 2018 | Central American and Caribbean Games | Barranquilla, Colombia | 13th (h) | 800 m | 1:50.75 |
| 2019 | South American Championships | Lima, Peru | 2nd | 800 m | 1:47.31 |
| 2019 | Pan American Games | Lima, Peru | 6th | 800 m | 1:47.98 |
| 2021 | South American Championships | Guayaquil, Ecuador | 4th | 800 m | 1:48.31 |
| 2022 | Ibero-American Championships | La Nucia, Spain | 15th (h) | 800 m | 1:53.19 |
| 2022 | Bolivarian Games | Valledupar, Colombia | 1st | 800 m | 1:48.05 |
| 2022 | Bolivarian Games | Valledupar, Colombia | 1st | 4 × 400 m relay | 3:06.61 |
| 2022 | South American Games | Asunción, Paraguay | 6th | 800 m | 1:49.40 |
| 2023 | South American Championships | São Paulo, Brazil | 4th | 800 m | 1:48.16 |

== Personal bests ==
Outdoor

- 400 metres – 47.11 (Tunja 2017)
- 800 metres – 1:46.23 (Ibagué 2021)
- 1500 metres – 3:57.09 (Bucaramanga 2023)
- 4 × 400 metres relay – 3:04.78 (Cochabamba 2018)
