= Athletics at the 2015 Summer Universiade – Men's 800 metres =

The men's 800 metres event at the 2015 Summer Universiade was held on 10, 11 and 12 July at the Gwangju Universiade Main Stadium.

== Medalists ==
| Gold | Silver | Bronze |
|---|---|---|
| Shaquille Walker; United States | Abdelati El Guesse; Morocco | Rynardt van Rensburg; South Africa |

== Results ==
=== Heats ===
Qualification: First 3 in each heat (Q) and next 6 fastest (q) qualified for the semifinals.

| Rank | Heat | Name | Nationality | Time | Notes |
|---|---|---|---|---|---|
| 1 | 3 | Abdelati El Guesse | Morocco | 1:48.57 | Q |
| 2 | 2 | Nicholas Hartle | United States | 1:49.74 | Q |
| 3 | 2 | Raimond Valler | Estonia | 1:49.75 | Q, PB |
| 4 | 2 | Timas Harik | Australia | 1:50.36 | Q |
| 5 | 4 | Anton Kulyatin | Russia | 1:50.49 | Q |
| 6 | 5 | Jorian Damen | Netherlands | 1:50.57 | Q |
| 7 | 4 | Shaquille Walker | United States | 1:50.60 | Q |
| 8 | 5 | Charles Grethen | Luxembourg | 1:50.62 | Q |
| 9 | 3 | Rynardt van Rensburg | South Africa | 1:50.79 | Q |
| 10 | 4 | Nick Jensen | Denmark | 1:50.88 | Q |
| 11 | 6 | Miguel Moreira | Portugal | 1:50.89 | Q |
| 12 | 3 | Hong Ingi | South Korea | 1:50.94 | Q, SB |
| 13 | 5 | Brendon Restall | Canada | 1:50.96 | Q |
| 14 | 2 | Amadou Kayantao | Mali | 1:51.02 | q, SB |
| 15 | 3 | Oleg Sidorov | Russia | 1:51.03 | q |
| 16 | 5 | Renārs Stepiņš | Latvia | 1:51.08 | q |
| 17 | 6 | Pauls Arents | Latvia | 1:51.17 | Q |
| 18 | 4 | Johan Svensson | Sweden | 1:51.28 | q, SB |
| 19 | 6 | Kamil Gurdak | Poland | 1:52.15 | Q |
| 20 | 1 | Adam Paul-Morris | Canada | 1:53.23 | Q |
| 21 | 6 | Ahmad Abdalla | Qatar | 1:53.24 | q, PB |
| 22 | 1 | Iulian Ganciu | Romania | 1:53.28 | Q |
| 23 | 1 | Bradley Mathas | New Zealand | 1:53.48 | Q |
| 24 | 5 | David Hodgson | Costa Rica | 1:53.71 | q |
| 25 | 4 | Roiman Ramírez | Venezuela | 1:53.77 | |
| 26 | 4 | Fang Jianyong | Singapore | 1:53.92 | PB |
| 27 | 5 | Festus Bett | Kenya | 1:54.01 | |
| 28 | 1 | Andreas Vojta | Austria | 1:54.18 | |
| 29 | 6 | Amir Messail | Algeria | 1:54.24 | SB |
| 30 | 5 | Haavard Hildeskor | Norway | 1:54.44 | |
| 31 | 1 | Marcel Ngabonziza | Rwanda | 1:54.51 | |
| 32 | 1 | Vishvajith Gammahelage | Sri Lanka | 1:54.71 | SB |
| 33 | 6 | Vidar Dahle | Norway | 1:55.17 | |
| 34 | 4 | Khalil Mustafa Hasan | Jordan | 1:55.26 | |
| 35 | 3 | Xie Zhaofu | China | 1:55.95 | |
| 36 | 1 | Ahmed Al-Aamri | Oman | 1:57.43 | |
| 37 | 5 | Kyle Stanley | Trinidad and Tobago | 1:57.80 | |
| 38 | 3 | Klavdij Ferle | Slovenia | 1:57.94 | |
| 39 | 6 | Said Al-Rahbi | Oman | 2:04.39 | |
| 40 | 2 | Hussein Zayat | Lebanon | 2:07.59 | |
| 41 | 2 | Isaac Moreno | Panama | 2:09.99 | |
| 42 | 2 | Chris Bata | Solomon Islands | 2:10.36 | |
| 43 | 1 | Montano Abeso Mbuy | Equatorial Guinea | 2:26.40 | |
| | 3 | Zelalem Yihunie | Ethiopia | DQ | R163.5 |
| | 6 | Hussein Khalife | Lebanon | DQ | R163.5 |
| | 2 | Allen Eke | Nigeria | DNS | |

=== Semifinals ===
Qualification: First 2 in each heat (Q) and the next 2 fastest (q) qualified for the final.

| Rank | Heat | Name | Nationality | Time | Notes |
|---|---|---|---|---|---|
| 1 | 3 | Rynardt van Rensburg | South Africa | 1:47.95 | Q |
| 2 | 3 | Abdelati El Guesse | Morocco | 1:47.96 | Q, SB |
| 3 | 3 | Nicholas Hartle | United States | 1:47.98 | q |
| 4 | 1 | Shaquille Walker | United States | 1:48.15 | Q |
| 5 | 1 | Nick Jensen | Denmark | 1:48.15 | Q, PB |
| 5 | 3 | Jorian Damen | Netherlands | 1:48.32 | q, PB |
| 7 | 1 | Anton Kulyatin | Russia | 1:48.49 | SB |
| 8 | 2 | Kamil Gurdak | Poland | 1:48.67 | Q |
| 9 | 1 | Bradley Mathas | New Zealand | 1:48.77 | |
| 10 | 1 | Iulian Ganciu | Romania | 1:48.84 | PB |
| 11 | 3 | Renārs Stepiņš | Latvia | 1:48.98 | |
| 12 | 2 | Miguel Moreira | Portugal | 1:49.05 | Q |
| 13 | 2 | Raimond Valler | Estonia | 1:49.26 | PB |
| 14 | 2 | Charles Grethen | Luxembourg | 1:49.31 | |
| 15 | 1 | Adam Paul-Morris | Canada | 1:49.56 | |
| 16 | 3 | Timas Harik | Australia | 1:49.59 | |
| 17 | 3 | Oleg Sidorov | Russia | 1:49.61 | |
| 18 | 2 | Pauls Arents | Latvia | 1:49.72 | |
| 19 | 2 | Brendon Restall | Canada | 1:50.41 | |
| 20 | 2 | Amadou Kayantao | Mali | 1:51.34 | |
| 21 | 1 | Hong Ingi | South Korea | 1:51.56 | |
| 22 | 2 | Johan Svensson | Sweden | 1:51.79 | |
| 23 | 3 | David Hodgson | Costa Rica | 1:53.11 | SB |
| 24 | 1 | Ahmad Abdalla | Qatar | 1:57.19 | |

=== Final ===
Official Video

| Rank | Name | Nationality | Time | Notes |
|---|---|---|---|---|
| 1st place, gold medalist(s) | Shaquille Walker | United States | 1:49.05 | |
| 2nd place, silver medalist(s) | Abdelati El Guesse | Morocco | 1:49.29 | |
| 3rd place, bronze medalist(s) | Rynardt van Rensburg | South Africa | 1:49.30 | |
| 4 | Miguel Moreira | Portugal | 1:50.26 | |
| 5 | Nicholas Hartle | United States | 1:50.73 | |
| 6 | Nick Jensen | Denmark | 1:50.95 | |
| 7 | Jorian Damen | Netherlands | 1:51.35 | |
| 8 | Kamil Gurdak | Poland | 1:52.13 | |
