= Demon Deacon =

Mascot character

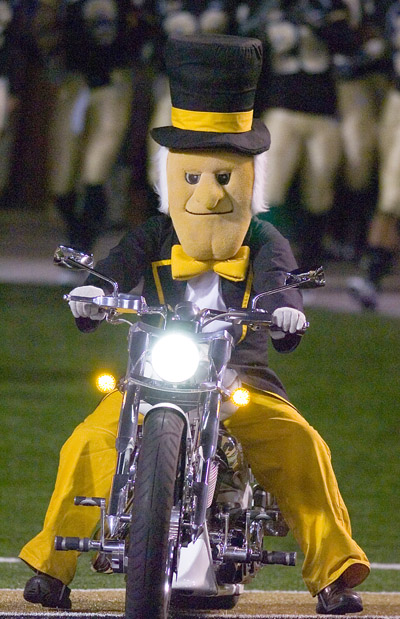
The Demon Deacon riding on to the field with his motorcycle has become a tradition during many Wake Forest home games for not only football, but basketball and soccer as well.

The Demon Deacon is the mascot of Wake Forest University, a school located in Winston-Salem, North Carolina, United States. Probably best known for its slightly unorthodox name and appearance, the Demon Deacon has become a mainstay in the world of U.S. college mascots.

== History ==
=== The early years and "The Old Gold & Black" ===
The origins of Wake Forest's mascot are distinctive, yet somewhat debated. As early as 1895, Wake Forest College (as it was called at the time) was using its colors in athletic competition. The school's literary magazine, The Wake Forest Student, described them in this manner:

At last, Wake Forest has a college badge. It is a very neat button designed by Mr. John M. Heck and contains a tiger's head over the letters WFC. The colors are in old gold and black.

During the early part of the 20th century, these colors became more and more associated with the college. Since Wake Forest was founded as a Baptist college, some historians have proposed an association with the Bible, but most people believe their adoption comes from the connection with the original tiger mascot.

The tiger mascot stayed with the school for a little more than two decades, but reports indicate that by the early 1920s, the college's nicknames were most commonly noted as the "Baptists", or "The Old Gold & Black".

=== Origin of the Demon Deacons name ===
The first few decades of the 20th century were particularly rough for the Wake Forest athletic squads, but in 1923, Hank Garrity took the head football and basketball coaching jobs. His leadership gave the school a short relief from its early mediocrity when he led the football team to three consecutive winning seasons, and the basketball team compiled a 33-14 combined record in two seasons.

In 1923, the Wake Forest football team defeated rival Trinity (later renamed Duke University). In the following issue of the school newspaper, the editor of the paper, Mayon Parker (1924 Wake Forest graduate), first referred to the team as "Demon Deacons", in recognition of what he called their "devilish" play and fighting spirit. Henry Belk, Wake Forest's news director, and Garrity liked the title and used it often, so the popularity of the term grew.

The name also refers to the Christian office of deacon, again referring to Wake Forest's status as a Baptist university until the 1980s.

== Mascot ==
The actual mascot made its first appearance in 1941. As the "Demon Deacon" terminology became more popular, Jack Baldwin (1943 Wake Forest graduate) became the first Deacon mascot.

"Some of my fraternity brothers and I were just sitting around one evening," Baldwin recalls, "and came to the agreement that what Wake Forest needed was someone dressed like a deacon -- top hat, tails, a black umbrella and all that. We wanted him to be more dignified than other mascots, sort of like an old Baptist Deacon would dress."

Baldwin found an old tuxedo and a top hat, and on the following Saturday, he led the Wake Forest football team onto the field, riding the North Carolina ram. Two years later, when Baldwin graduated, many interested students were willing to continue dressing up as the mascot. Initially, the responsibility to pick new Demon Deacons fell on Baldwin's fraternity, but later it broadened to include all students. Today, special tryouts are held annually for new Deacons, and the competition is very intense.

A number of years later the mascot continued to be the Demon Deacon, but the full body was designed after a fan and student named "Doc" Murphrey. If he wasn't going to become a star on the football field, he would become the biggest fan the school had ever seen. "We were playing against Carolina, and the fans started hollering, 'We want Murphrey. We want Murphrey.' Peahead got tired of it and hollered, 'Murphrey, come here.' And I said, 'Coach, who do I go in for?' And he said, 'No damn body. They want you and I don't want you, so get up there with them.' I started right then and there being a cheerleader, not really a cheerleader, but just a guy who would get up when you needed somebody to rally the troops."

=== Memorable mascots ===
Over the years, the Deacon has performed numerous memorable stunts:

- Jimmy Devos (1955 Wake Forest graduate) shocked a Bowman Gray Stadium football crowd one afternoon by dropping his pants—only to reveal a pair of colorful Bermuda shorts.
- Ray Whitley (1957 Wake Forest graduate) introduced the art of goal-climbing to Wake Forest contests.
- Bill Shepherd (1960 Wake Forest graduate) answered Auburn's war eagle cry with his own "turkey buzzard."
- Joe Hensley (1961 Wake Forest graduate) was the first Deacon to get on the roof of Wait Chapel to motivate the students during the football season.
- Hap Bulger (1965 Wake Forest graduate) gained notoriety as the stately "Debonair Deacon."
- Jeff Dobbs (1977 Wake Forest graduate), perhaps the most well-known Deacon, was a spirited and acrobatic dancer, who has returned on occasion to inspire Wake Forest crowds with his cheering and antics.

== See also ==
- Wake Forest Demon Deacons
- Wake Forest Demon Deacons football
- Wake Forest Demon Deacons men's basketball
