= Marc Reuther =

German middle-distance runner

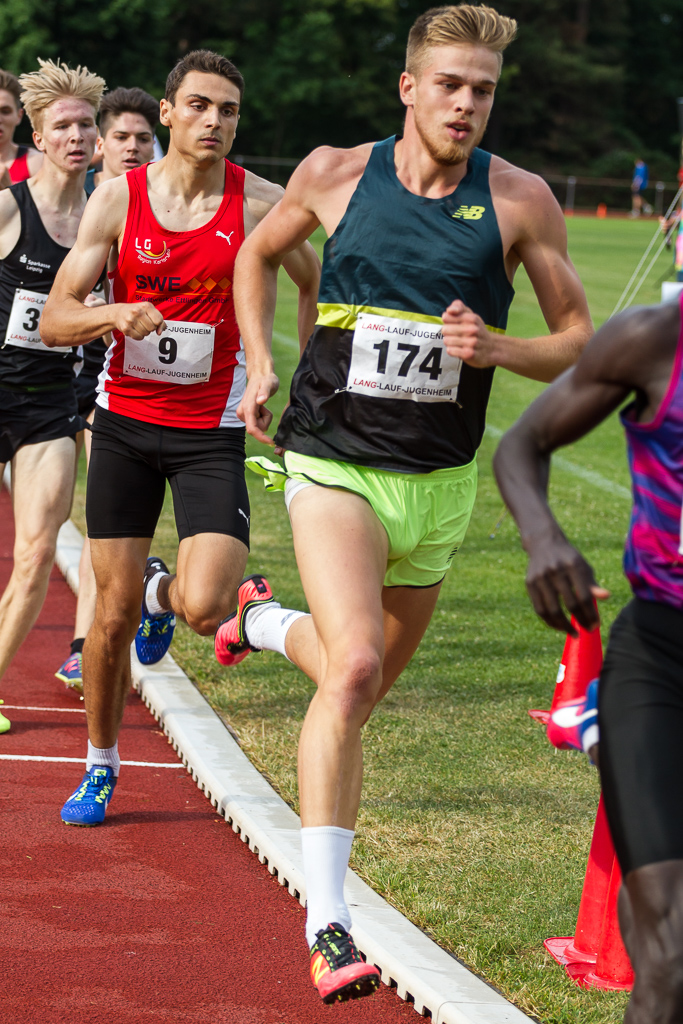
- Reuther (174) in 2017

Personal information
- Full name: Marc Leo Reuther
- Born: 23 June 1996 (age 30) Düsseldorf, Germany
- Height: 1.93 m (6 ft 4 in)
- Weight: 77 kg (170 lb)

Sport
- Sport: Athletics
- Event: 800 metres
- Club: Wiesbadener LV
- Coached by: Georg Schmidt

Marc Reuther (born 23 June 1996 in Düsseldorf) is a German middle-distance runner specialising in the 800 metres. He represented his country at the 2017 World Championships without advancing to the semifinals. In addition, he won a bronze medal at the 2017 European U23 Championships.

== International competitions ==
Year	Competition	Venue	Position	Event	Notes
Representing Germany
2013	World Youth Championships	Donetsk, Ukraine	5th	800 m	1:50.05
2014	World Junior Championships	Eugene, United States	38th (h)	800 m	1:52.33
2015	European Junior Championships	Eskilstuna, Sweden	7th	800 m	1:50.73
2017	European U23 Championships	Bydgoszcz, Poland	3rd	800 m	1:48.66
2017	World Championships	London, United Kingdom	33rd (h)	800 m	1:47.78
2018	European Championships	Berlin, Germany	–	800 m	DQ
2019	World Championships	Doha, Qatar	33rd (h)	800 m	1:47.31
2021	European Indoor Championships	Toruń, Poland	31st (h)	800 m	1:50.98
2022	World Indoor Championships	Belgrade, Serbia	11th (h)	800 m	1:48.63
2022	World Championships	Eugene, United States	40th (h)	800 m	1:50.75
2022	European Championships	Munich, Germany	28th (h)	800 m	1:48.33

== Personal bests ==
Outdoor

- 400 metres – 47.77 (Flieden 2016)
- 600 metres – 1:15.67 (Königstein 2021)
- 800 metres – 1:44.71 (Schifflange 2021)
- 1500 metres – 3:40.03 (Berlin 2018)

Indoor

- 400 metres – 48.50 (Erfurt 2014)
- 600 metres – 1:16.56 (Frankfurt 2021)
- 800 metres – 1:45.39 (Erfurt 2020)
- 1500 metres – 3:44.07 (Leipzig 2019)
