= Luke Mathews =

Australian middle-distance runner

Personal information
- Nationality: Australian
- Born: 21 June 1995 (age 31) Williamstown, Australia
- Height: 1.83 m (6 ft 0 in)
- Weight: 70 kg (154 lb)

Sport
- Sport: Track and field
- Events: 800 metres, 1500 metres
- Coached by: Elizabeth Mathews

Achievements and titles
- Personal bests: 800 m: 1:45.16 min (2016); 1500 m: 3:35.57 min (2017)
Medal record
Representing Australia
Men's athletics
Bronze medal – third place	2018 Gold Coast	800 m
- Updated on 15 April 2018

Luke Mathews (born 21 June 1995) is a retired Australian middle-distance runner who competes in the 800 metres and 1500 metres. He represented his country in both events at the 2016 Summer Olympics. As well as in the 4 × 800 m at the 2017 IAAF World Relays, the 1500m at the 2017 IAAF World Championships and in both events at the 2018 Commonwealth Games. He also competed for Australia at 2019 World Athletics Championships in the 800 m.

== Athletics career ==
Born in Williamstown, Melbourne, Mathews made his international debut at the 2014 World Junior Championships in Athletics, being a semi-finalist in the 800 metres. He made his breakthrough at senior level in 2016. After a win at the Hunter Track Classic he then ran world record holder David Rudisha to the line at the Melbourne Track Classic, recording a personal best of 1:45.16 minutes. It was the fastest time for the 800 m by an Australian in Australia for nearly 35 years.

He was selected to compete for Australia at the 2016 Summer Olympics in both 800 m and 1500 m. He was eliminated in the heats stages. He competed for Australia at the 2017 IAAF World Championships in the 1500 m. He finished 1st in his Heat with the overall fastest time. He was just eliminated in the Semi-Final. He competed for Australia at the 2018 Commonwealth Games in both 800 m and 1500 m. He finished 3rd with a Bronze Medal in the 800m Final. He also made the Final of the 1500m. He competed for Australia at the 2019 World Athletics Championships in the 800 m. He finished 7th in his Heat.

== Personal life ==
Mathews grew up in Werribee and Newport and attended St Kevin's College.

As a junior he competed for the Werribee and Altona Little Athletics centres.

He was also a talented junior Australian Rules Footballer having a stint with the Western Jets before turning his focus to athletics.

He has completed studying a Bachelor of Commerce (finance) at Deakin University.

== Personal bests ==
- 600 metres – 1:18.05 min (2016)
- 800 metres – 1:45.16 min (2016)
- 1000 metres – 2:19.57 min (2017)
- 1500 metres – 3:35.57 min (2017)
- Mile run – 3:54.53 min (2017)
- 3000 metres – 8:23.10 min (2012)
- 5000 metres – 14:36.80 min (2014)
- Mile run (road) – 4:03.0 (2016)

All information from All-Athletics profile.

== International competitions ==
Year	Competition	Venue	Position	Event	Notes
2014	World Junior Championships	Eugene, United States	8th (sf)	800 m	1:55.92
2016	Olympic Games	Rio de Janeiro, Brazil	7th (h)	800 m	1:50.17
2016	Olympic Games	Rio de Janeiro, Brazil	13th (h)	1500 m	3:44.51
2017	World Championships	London, United Kingdom	19th (sf)	1500 m	3:40.91
2018	Commonwealth Games	Gold Coast, Australia	3rd	800 m	1:45.60
2018	Commonwealth Games	Gold Coast, Australia	12th	1500 m	3:47.04
2019	World Championships	Doha, Qatar	39th (h)	800 m	1:50.16
