= 2013 World Youth Championships in Athletics – Boys' 800 metres =

Boys' 800 metres at the 2013 World Youth Championships in Athletics
- Venue: RSC Olimpiyskiy
- Dates: 10 July (heats); 11 July (semifinal); 13 July (final)
- Competitors: 41
- Winning time: 1:48.01 WYL

Medalists
gold medal	Alfred Kipketer	Kenya
silver medal	Konstantin Tolokonnikov	Russia
bronze medal	Kyle Langford	Great Britain

The boys' 800 metres at the 2013 World Youth Championships in Athletics was held on 10, 11 and 13 July.

== Medalists ==
Gold	Silver	Bronze
Alfred Kipketer; Kenya	Konstantin Tolokonnikov; Russia	Kyle Langford; Great Britain

== Records ==
Prior to the competition, the following records were as follows.

World Youth Best	Mohammed Aman (ETH)	1:43.37	Rieti, Italy	10 September 2011
Championship Record	Leonard Kirwa Kosencha (KEN)	1:44.08	Lille, France	9 July 2011
World Youth Leading	Robert Biwott (KEN)	1:46.98	Tokyo, Japan	5 May 2013

== Heats ==
Qualification rule: first 4 of each heat (Q) and the next 4 fastest qualified.

=== Heat 1 ===
Rank	Lane	Name	Nationality	Time	Notes
1	2	Patrick Kiprotich Ronoh	Kenya	1.51.50	Q
2	6	Jay-be van Rooyen	South Africa	1.52.05	Q
3	5	Matúš Talán	Slovakia	1.52.70	Q, PB
4	1	Sondre Dingsør Skogen	Norway	1.52.75	Q, PB
5	4	Bojan Stanisic	Bosnia and Herzegovina	1.53.23	q, PB
6	8	Sabry Salem Mohamed	Egypt	1.53.40	
7	3	Robert Ford	United States	1.53.61	
8	7	Riadh Chninni	Tunisia	1.58.77	

=== Heat 2 ===
Rank	Lane	Name	Nationality	Time	Notes
1	5	Marc Reuther	Germany	1:52.86	Q
2	1	William Levay	Sweden	1:53.13	Q
3	6	Mohamed Elnour Mohamed	Qatar	1:53.37	Q
4	4	Gerard Badia	Spain	1:53.39	Q
5	2	Sebastian Ursachi	Romania	1:54.11	
6	8	Thomas Oxland	Canada	1:55.60	PB
	3	Fathi Ahmed Adam	Sudan	DQ	
	7	Tsegay Tesfemariam	Eritrea	DNS	

=== Heat 3 ===
Rank	Lane	Name	Nationality	Time	Notes
1	6	Alfred Kipketer	Kenya	1:50.14	Q, PB
2	3	Mamush Lencha	Ethiopia	1:50.30	Q
3	5	Konstantin Tolokonnikov	Russia	1:51.22	Q
4	1	Hristos Kotitsas	Greece	1:52.88	Q
5	2	Jesús Tonatiú López	Mexico	1:54.40	
6	4	Marco Lano	Italy	1:54.63	
7	7	Cosmin Trofin	Romania	1:56.58	
8	6	Frangueira Fernando	Angola	2:05.81	PB
	8	Serdal Karatas	Turkey	DQ	

=== Heat 4 ===
Rank	Lane	Name	Nationality	Time	Notes
1	5	Kyle Langford	Great Britain	1:51:88	Q
2	6	Abrahaley Tadesse	Ethiopia	1:51:92	Q, PB
3	1	Philip Lonmon	Germany	1:52:02	Q
4	2	Axel Vives	Spain	1:52:44	Q
5	8	Henri Lacoste	France	1:52:61	q
6	3	Kristian Uldbjerg Hansen	Denmark	1:52:98	q, PB
7	4	Carter Day	Canada	1:53:13	q
8	7	Dmytro Baydalyuk	Ukraine	1:53:63	PB

=== Heat 5 ===
Rank	Lane	Name	Nationality	Time	Notes
1	7	Oussama Nabil	Morocco	1:53:49	Q
2	6	Louis Rawlings	France	1:53:88	Q
3	8	Yeoryios Kiloglou	Greece	1:53:95	Q
4	3	Jacopo Peron	Italy	1:54:19	Q
5	1	Edvard Kamperud Nygaard	Norway	1:55:99	
6	2	Jhonny Pacheco	Venezuela	1:56:49	
7	5	Naif Obaid Mashnafi	Saudi Arabia	1:57:29	
	4	Hamid Sulema Ferej	Eritrea	DNS	

== Semifinals ==
Qualification rule: first 2 of each heat (Q) plus the 2 fastest times (q) qualified.

=== Heat 1 ===
Rank	Name	Nationality	Time	Notes
1	Alfred Kipketer	Kenya	1:48.38	Q, PB
2	Mamush Lencha	Ethiopia	1:48.68	Q, SB
3	Kyle Langford	Great Britain	1:48.85	q, PB
4	Louis Rawlings	France	1:52.59	
5	Yeoryios Kiloglou	Greece	1:53.05	
6	Gerard Badia	Spain	1:53.53	
7	Matúš Talán	Slovakia	1:54.02	
8	Sondre Dingsør Skogen	Norway	2:00.67	

=== Heat 2 ===
Rank	Name	Nationality	Time	Notes
1	Konstantin Tolokonnikov	Russia	1:50.92	Q
2	Abrahaley Tadesse	Ethiopia	1:51.06	Q, PB
3	Philip Lonmon	Germany	1:51.25	
4	Henri Lacoste	France	1:53.44	
5	Carter Day	Canada	1:53.69	
6	Bojan Stanisic	Bosnia and Herzegovina	1:54.56	
7	William Levay	Sweden	1:54.97	
8	Jay-be van Rooyen	South Africa	1:57.02	

=== Heat 3 ===
Rank	Name	Nationality	Time	Notes
1	Patrick Kiprotich Ronoh	Kenya	1:49.50	Q, PB
2	Oussama Nabil	Morocco	1:49.95	Q
3	Marc Reuther	Germany	1:50.08	q, PB
4	Mohamed Elnour Mohamed	Qatar	1:50.66	PB
5	Kristian Uldbjerg Hansen	Denmark	1:52.19	PB
6	Axel Vives	Spain	1:53.59	
7	Jacopo Peron	Italy	1:57.75	
	Hristos Kotitsas	Greece	DQ	

== Final ==
Results:

Rank	Name	Nationality	Time	Notes
1st place, gold medalist(s)	Alfred Kipketer	Kenya	1:48.01	PB
2nd place, silver medalist(s)	Konstantin Tolokonnikov	Russia	1:48.29	PB
3rd place, bronze medalist(s)	Kyle Langford	Great Britain	1:48.32	PB
4	Mamush Lencha	Ethiopia	1:49.85	
5	Marc Reuther	Germany	1:50.05	PB
6	Oussama Nabil	Morocco	1:50.28	
7	Abrahaley Tadesse	Ethiopia	1:50.60	PB
8	Patrick Kiprotich Ronoh	Kenya	1:51.53	
