= Shaquille Walker =

American runner (born 1993)

Personal information
- Nationality: American
- Born: June 24, 1993 (age 33) Blue Island, Illinois, U.S.
- Height: 1.79 m (5 ft 10 in)

Sport
- Country: United States
- Sport: Track, Road running
- Events: 800 metres, 400 metres
- College team: BYU Cougars
- Club: Brooks Beast Seattle
- Team: Brooks Sports
- Turned pro: 2016
- Coached by: Dan Mackey
- Retired: 2018
Medal record
Men's athletics
Representing the USA
Athletics at the 2015 Summer Universiade
Gold medal – first place	2015 Gwangju, South Korea	800 m
2012 World Junior Championships in Athletics
	Barcelona, Spain	800 m

Shaquille Walker (born February 2, 1993) is an American retired track runner competing for the United States and a former Brigham Young University track student-athlete.

== Prep ==
Walker is African-American, born in Blue Island, Illinois. His family moved to Richmond Hill, Georgia, when he was very young. Walker was raised Baptist. He converted to the Church of Jesus Christ of Latter-day Saints while in high school and served a mission for the church in the Manchester, England. Walker won 2011 Georgia High School Association AAAA state track and field title in 800 meters in a time of 1:53.27. Walker won 2010 Georgia High School Association AAAA state track and field title in 800 meters in a time of 1:51.71.

== NCAA ==
Walker finished third at the 2016 NCAA Championships. Walker finished third at the 2016 NCAA Indoor Championships. Walker finished fifth at the 2015 NCAA Championships. Walker finished tenth at the 2015 NCAA Indoor Championships. Walker is a three time Mountain Pacific Sports Federation track and field champion (Once as a member of the 4 × 400 m relay team).

Walker finished his BYU career as the school record holder in the indoor 800 meters with a time of 1:46.97, set in 2016. He also was part of the Distance medley relay (DMR) squad that holds the program record with a time of 9:29.00, set in 2012, and the 4 × 400 Men's Relay squad that set the school record in 2015 with a 3:07.66 time. As an outdoor track and field athlete, Walker also holds the school record in the 800 m with a time of 1:44.99, set in 2016. In 2015, Walker ran a 400 m in 46:00 and sits in sixth place in the record books at Brigham Young University. His 4 × 400-meter relay squad holds the record with a time of 3:03.82 and the DMR record with a time of 3:14.74, both records set in 2015.

Walker qualified to compete in the 2016 U.S. Olympic Trials and placed 11th overall with a time of 1:47.93.

The Curtis Pugsley Track and Field Award is BYU track and field's highest honor, given each year to one male and one female student athlete. The winners of the 2016 Curtis Pugsley Track and Field Athlete of the Year Award are Shaquille Walker and Shea Collinsworth. Walker placed 17th in 800 meters 2012 World Junior Championships in Athletics.

Year	MPSF indoor	NCAA indoor	NCAA Outdoor
2016	800 m 1:46.97 1st	800 m 1:47.50 3rd	800 m 1:45.17 3rd
2016	4 × 400 3:07.68 2nd		
2015	800 m 1:48.53 1st	800 m 1:48.99 10th	800 m 1:49.99 5th
2015	4 × 400 3:07.66 1st		
2012	800 m 1:49.85 5th		
2012	4 × 400 3:09.71 3rd		4 × 400 3:06.81 15th

== Professional ==
Walker placed 1st in 800 meters at 2012 USA Junior Outdoor Track and Field Championships in 1:49.39.

Walker placed 6th in 800 meters at 2015 USA Outdoor Track and Field Championships in 1:46.60.

In June 2016, Walker signed a contract with Brooks Sports to represent their brand as a professional athlete. Walker placed 11th in 800 meters at 2016 United States Olympic Trials (track and field) in 1:47.93.

Immediately after the 2016 Olympic Trials, Walker won the Nick Symmonds Springfield Straight 800m Road Race, where he ran 1:46.54 to break the world record for the distance on the roads.

Walker placed 12th in 800 meters at 2017 USA Outdoor Track and Field Championships in 1:47.02.

In January 2018, FloTrack announced his retirement.

=== Major competition ===
In the summer of 2015 Walker received the gold medal in 800 meters at the 2015 Summer Universiade.

Year	Competition	Venue	Position	Event	Notes
2012	USA Junior Outdoor Track and Field Championships	Bloomington, Indiana	1st	800 m	1:49.39
2015	USA Outdoor Track and Field Championships	Eugene, Oregon	6th	800 m	1:46.60
2016	US Olympic Trials	Eugene, Oregon	11th	800 m	1:47.93
2017	USA Outdoor Track and Field Championships	Sacramento, California	12th	800 m	1:47.02

== Sources ==
- Robinson, Doug. " LDS convert, BYU star Shaquille Walker is a secret no more", Deseret News, Feb. 11, 2015
- Dick Harmon. "Shaquille Walker's Olympic hurt will simmer for a while", Deseret News, July 6, 2016
- Jamie Parker- "Shaquille Walker was not disqualified from Olympic Trials", Savannah Now, July 3, 2016
- BYU athletics profile
- July 8, 2016 Salt Lake Tribune article on Walker
