= Athletics at the 2019 Pan American Games – Men's 800 metres =

Men's 800 metres at the 2019 Pan American Games
- Venue: Athletics Stadium
- Dates: August 9 – August 10
- Competitors: 13 from 10 nations
- Winning time: 1:44.25

Medalists
Gold medal	Marco Arop	Canada
Silver medal	Wesley Vázquez	Puerto Rico
Bronze medal	Ryan Sánchez	Puerto Rico

The men's 800 metres competition of the athletics events at the 2019 Pan American Games took place between the 9 and 10 of August at the 2019 Pan American Games Athletics Stadium. The defending Pan American Games champion before the 2019 Games was Clayton Murphy from the United States.

== Records ==
Prior to this competition, the existing world and Pan American Games records were as follows:

World record	David Rudisha (KEN)	1:40.91	London, United Kingdom	August 09, 2012
Pan American Games record	Yeimer López (CUB)	1:44.58	Rio de Janeiro, Brazil	July 28, 2007

== Schedule ==
Date	Time	Round
August 9, 2019	15:50	Semifinal
August 10, 2019	14:55	Final

== Results ==
All times shown are in seconds.

KEY:	q	Fastest non-qualifiers	Q	Qualified	NR	National record	PB	Personal best	SB	Seasonal best	DQ	Disqualified

=== Semifinal ===
The heats took place on 9 August at 15:50. The results were as follows:
Qualification: First 3 in each heat (Q) and the next 2 fastest (q) advance to the Final

Rank	Heat	Name	Nationality	Time	Notes
1	2	Bryce Hoppel	United States	1:48.04	Q
2	1	Wesley Vázquez	Puerto Rico	1:48.38	Q
3	2	Ryan Sánchez	Puerto Rico	1:48.62	Q
4	1	Marco Arop	Canada	1:48.71	Q
5	2	Marco Vilca	Peru	1:49.49	Q
6	2	Lucirio Antonio Garrido	Venezuela	1:49.51	q
7	1	Jelssin Robledo	Colombia	1:49.51	Q
8	1	Alejandro Peirano	Chile	1:49.99	q
9	2	Rafael Muñoz	Chile	1:50.03	
10	1	Jauavney James	Jamaica	1:50.38	
11	2	Jorge Arturo Montes	Mexico	1:50.47	
12	1	Dage Minors	Bermuda	1:50.68	
	1	Jesús Tonatiu López	Mexico	DNF	

=== Final ===
The final took place on 10 August at 14:55. The results were as follows:

Rank	Name	Nationality	Time	Notes
1st place, gold medalist(s)	Marco Arop	Canada	1:44.25	GR
2nd place, silver medalist(s)	Wesley Vázquez	Puerto Rico	1:44.48	
3rd place, bronze medalist(s)	Ryan Sánchez	Puerto Rico	1:45.19	
4	Bryce Hoppel	United States	1:47.48	
5	Marco Vilca	Peru	1:47.65	PB
6	Jelssin Robledo	Colombia	1:47.98	
	Alejandro Peirano	Chile	DNF	
	Lucirio Antonio Garrido	Venezuela	DNS	
