= Athletics at the 2023 Pan American Games – Men's 800 metres =

Men's 800 metres at the 2023 Pan American Games
- Venue: Julio Martínez National Stadium
- Dates: November 3 – November 4
- Competitors: 18 from 11 nations
- Winning time: 1:45.69

Medalists
Gold medal	José Antonio Maita	Venezuela
Silver medal	Jesús Tonatiú López	Mexico
Bronze medal	Navasky Anderson	Jamaica

The men's 800 metres competition of the athletics events at the 2023 Pan American Games was held on November 3–4 at the Julio Martínez National Stadium of Santiago, Chile.

== Records ==
Prior to this competition, the existing world and Pan American Games records were as follows:

World record	David Rudisha (KEN)	1:40.91	London, United Kingdom	August 9, 2012
Pan American Games record	Marco Arop (CAN)	1:44.25	Lima, Peru	August 10, 2019

== Schedule ==
Date	Time	Round
November 3, 2023	19:45	Semifinal
November 4, 2023	19:10	Final

== Results ==
=== Semifinal ===
Qualification: First 2 in each heat (Q) and next 2 fastest (q) qualified for the final.

==== Heat 1 ====
Rank	Lane	Athlete	Nation	Time	Notes
1	6	Navasky Anderson	Jamaica	1:47.51	Q
2	3	Ryan Sánchez	Puerto Rico	1:47.59	Q
3	8	Abraham Alvarado	United States	1:47.72	
4	5	Stephen Evans	Canada	1:48.98	
5	7	Marco Vilca	Peru	1:49.55	
6	4	Luis Peralta	Dominican Republic	1:55.74	

==== Heat 2 ====
Rank	Lane	Athlete	Nation	Time	Notes
1	6	Jesús Tonatiú López	Mexico	1:48.65	Q
2	4	José Antonio Maita	Venezuela	1:49.12	Q
3	5	Leandro Alves	Brazil	1:49.47	
4	3	Zakary Mama-Yari	Canada	1:49.71	
5	8	Rafael Muñoz	Chile	1:49.96	
6	7	Dennick Luke	Dominica	1:50.17	

==== Heat 3 ====
Rank	Lane	Athlete	Nation	Time	Notes
1	8	Chamar Chambers	Panama	1:46.99	Q, PB
2	3	Ryan López	Venezuela	1:47.22	Q, PB
3	6	John Rivera	Puerto Rico	1:47.42	q
4	5	Ferdy Agramonte	Dominican Republic	1:47.55	q
5	7	Eduardo Moreira	Brazil	1:48.37	
6	4	Derek Holdsworth	United States	1:48.41	

=== Final ===
The results were as follows

Rank	Lane	Name	Nationality	Time	Notes
1st place, gold medalist(s)	3	José Antonio Maita	Venezuela	1:45.69	PB
2nd place, silver medalist(s)	6	Jesús Tonatiú López	Mexico	1:46.04	
3rd place, bronze medalist(s)	4	Navasky Anderson	Jamaica	1:46.40	
4	7	John Rivera	Puerto Rico	1:46.73	
5	5	Ryan Sánchez	Puerto Rico	1:47.07	
6	8	Chamar Chambers	Panama	1:47.84	
7	2	Ryan López	Venezuela	1:48.06	
–	1	Ferdy Agramonte	Dominican Republic	DNF	
