= Brad Mathas =

New Zealand athlete (born 1993)

Personal information
- Nationality: New Zealand
- Born: 24 June 1993 (age 33) Canberra, Australia
- Height: 188 cm (6 ft 2 in) (2018)
- Weight: 77 kg (170 lb) (2018)

Sport
- Sport: Track and Field
- Events: 800m, 1500m

Brad Mathas (born 24 June 1993) is a New Zealand middle-distance runner who specializes in the 800 metres. He is a multiple-time national champion in the 800 metres and represented New Zealand at the World Athletics Championships and the Commonwealth Games.

== Early life ==
Mathas was born in Canberra, Australia where he was a keen soccer player. He moved to New Zealand in 2005 with his mum and sister as they settled in Whanganui on the North Island. Aged 15 he was selected for the New Zealand football development squad but instead chose to focus on running and was selected for the 2010 Youth Olympics in Singapore, and the 2012 World Junior Championships in Athletics held in Barcelona. He also ran at the 2015 World University Games in Gwangju, South Korea.

== Career ==
In 2019, in Christchurch, Mathas won the senior New Zealand 800m national championship 800m race for the eighth consecutive year. The previous year he had represented New Zealand at the 2018 Commonwealth Games held on the Gold Coast, in which he placed fifth overall in the final of the 800 metres. In competing there he became the first Kiwi to compete in a Games 800m race for twelve years.

In 2022 Mathas won gold at the 2022 Oceania Athletics Championships 800m race before competing for his country at the 2022 World Athletics Championships held in Eugene, Oregon.

At the 2023 World Athletics Championships in Budapest, he raced in the 800m.

== Personal life ==
Mathas now lives and trains in Melbourne, Victoria where he is trained by Justin Rinaldi and runs at the Fast 8 Track Club along with the likes of Peter Bol.

== Personal bests ==
Outdoor

- 800 metres – 1:45.75 (Pfungstadt 2023)
- 1000 metres – 2:18.97 (Melbourne 2021)
- 1500 metres – 3:44.85 (Melbourne 2023)

Indoor

- 1000 metres – 2:23.01 (Boston 2020)
