= Vladimir Tolokonnikov (ice hockey) =

Russian ice hockey player

- Born: October 13, 1973 (age 51); Atakent, Kazakh SSR, Soviet Union
- Height: 6 ft 3 in (191 cm)
- Weight: 192 lb (87 kg; 13 st 10 lb)
- Position: Defence
- Played for: Vyatich Ryazan; Khimik Voskresensk; Sokol Lukhovitsy; Ak Bars Kazan
- Playing career: 1991–1998

Vladimir Tolokonnikov (born October 13, 1973) is a Russian and Soviet former professional ice hockey defenceman. He is a one-time Russian Champion.

== Awards and honors ==
Award	Year
Russian Superleague
Champion (Ak Bars Kazan)	1998
