= Kipyegon Bett =

Kenyan middle-distance runner (1998–2024)

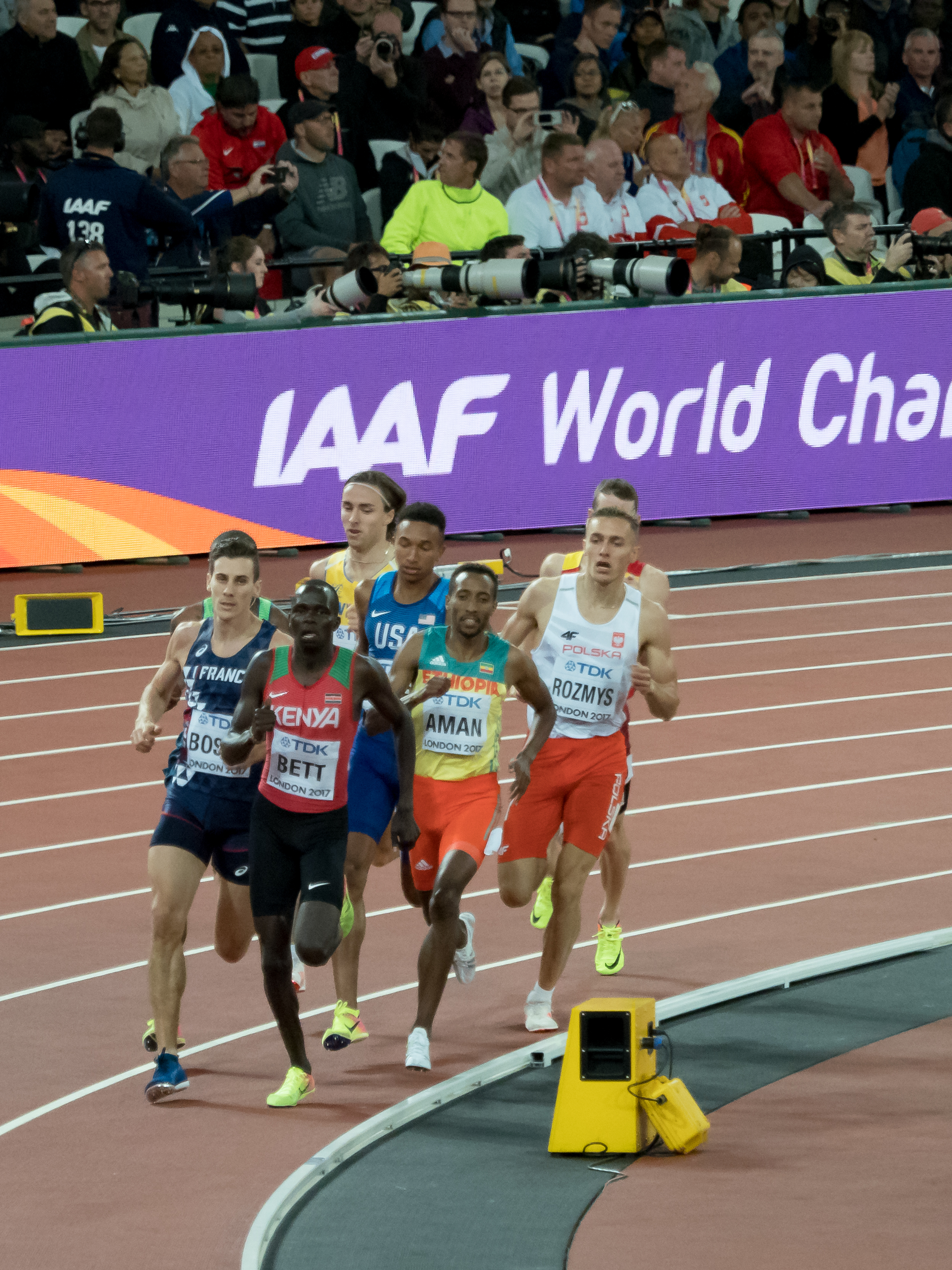
- Bett (red shirt) in 2017

Personal information
- Nationality: Kenyan
- Born: 1 February 1998
- Died: 6 October 2024 (aged 26) Bomet County, Kenya

Sport
- Country: Kenya
- Sport: Track and field
- Event: 800 meters

Achievements and titles
- Personal bests: 800 m: 1:43.76 (Berlin 2016); 1000 m: 2:16.98 (Stockholm 2018)
Medal record
Men's athletics
World Championships
Bronze medal – third place	2017 London	800 m
World Relay Championships
Silver medal – second place	2017 Nassau	4×800 m relay

Kipyegon Bett (1 February 1998 – 6 October 2024) was a Kenyan middle-distance runner specialising in the 800 metres. Bett won the 800 metres at the 2016 World U20 Championships in Bydgoszcz, Poland. He also came second in the 800 metres at the 2015 World Youth Championships in Cali, Colombia. In the second meet of the 2017 IAAF Diamond League in Shanghai, Bett won the 800 m event in 1:44.70.

Bett won the bronze medal in the 800 metres at the 2017 World Championships held in London.

He tested positive for EPO in 2018 and received a four-year ban in November of the same year.

He was the brother of Purity Kirui, a two-time Commonwealth Games 3000 m Steeplechase medallist.

Kipyegon Bett died from renal and hepatic failure on 6 October 2024, while receiving treatment at a hospital in Bomet County after being ill for over a month. He was 26.

== Competition record ==
Year	Competition	Venue	Position	Event	Notes
Representing Kenya
2015	African Youth Championships	Réduit, Mauritius	1st	800 m	1:51.67
2015	World Youth Championships	Cali, Colombia	2nd	800 m	1:45.86
2016	World U20 Championships	Bydgoszcz, Poland	1st	800 m	1:44.95
2017	World Relays	Nassau, Bahamas	2nd	4 × 800 m relay	7:13.70
2017	World Championships	London, United Kingdom	3rd	800 m	1:45:21
