= Ryan Sánchez =

Puerto Rican middle-distance runner

Personal information
- Full name: Ryan Yaviel Sánchez Estrada
- Born: June 22, 1998 (age 28)

Sport
- Sport: Track and field
- Event: 800 metres
Medal record
Men's athletics
Representing Puerto Rico
Pan American Games
Bronze medal – third place	2019 Lima	800 m
Central American and Caribbean Games
Silver medal – second place	2018 Barranquilla	800 m
Silver medal – second place	2023 San Salvador	800 m

Ryan Yaviel Sánchez Estrada (born 22 June 1998) is a Puerto Rican middle-distance runner specialising in the 800 metres. He won a bronze medal at the 2019 Pan American Games. As still a junior, he represented his country at the 2017 World Championships in London without advancing from the heats.

== International competitions ==
Year	Competition	Venue	Position	Event	Notes
Representing Puerto Rico
2015	World Youth Championships	Cali, Colombia	18th (sf)	800 m	1:57.02
2016	World U20 Championships	Bydgoszcz, Poland	18th (sf)	800 m	1:49.43
2017	Pan American U20 Championships	Trujillo, Peru	1st	800 m	1:46.41
2017	World Championships	London, United Kingdom	41st (h)	800 m	1:50.74
2018	Central American and Caribbean Games	Barranquilla, Colombia	2nd	800 m	1:46.3
2019	Pan American Games	Lima, Peru	3rd	800 m	1:45.19
2019	World Championships	Doha, Qatar	42nd (h)	800 m	1:54.46
2021	Olympic Games	Tokyo, Japan	34th (h)	800 m	1:47.07
2022	Ibero-American Championships	La Nucía, Spain	5th	800 m	1:47.48
2022	NACAC Championships	Freeport, Bahamas	4th	800 m	1:47.66
2023	Central American and Caribbean Games	San Salvador, El Salvador	2nd	800 m	1:46.86
2023	World Championships	Budapest, Hungary	45th (h)	800 m	1:48.24
2023	Pan American Games	Santiago, Chile	5th	800 m	1:47.07
2026	Ibero-American Championships	Lima, Peru	8th	800 m	1:55.16
2026	Central American and Caribbean Games	Santo Domingo, Dominican Republic	5th	800 m	1:47.43

== Personal bests ==
Outdoor

- 800 metres – 1:44.82 (Ponce 2019)
- 1500 metres – 3:49.33 (Gainesville 2019)

Indoor

- One mile – 4:29.16 (Winston Salem 2019)
