= Konstantin Tolokonnikov =

Russian middle-distance runner

Personal information
- Nationality: Russian
- Born: 26 February 1996 (age 30) Rostov-on-Don, Russia

Sport
- Sport: Track and field
- Event: 800 metres

Achievements and titles
- Personal best: 1:45.76
Medal record
Men's athletics
Representing Russia
European Junior Championships
| Gold medal – first place | 2015 Eskilstuna | 4x400 m |
| Silver medal – second place | 2015 Eskilstuna | 800 m |
World Youth Championships
| Silver medal – second place | 2013 Donetsk | 800 m |

Konstantin Tolokonnikov (born 26 February 1996 in Rostov-on-Don, Russia) is a Russian middle distance runner who has specializes in the 800 metres. Tolokonnikov has won silver medals at the 2013 World Youth Championships and at the 2015 European Junior Championships. At the 2015 European Junior Championships Tolokonnikov won the gold medal in the 4 × 400 metres relay.

At the 2013 World Youth Championships, Tolokonnikov passed five men in the last 100 m. He earned the nickname “the second Borzakovskiy” after the Russian Olympic 2004 champion Yuriy Borzakovskiy.

In August 2015 Tolokonnikov won his first Russian national Championships gold with a personal best of 1:45.76. His time qualified him to the 2015 World Championships. A few days later Tolokonnikov was chosen to represent Russia at the 2015 World Championships in Beijing.

== International competitions ==
Representing Russia
| Year | Competition | Venue | Position | Event | Notes |
|---|---|---|---|---|---|
| 2013 | World Youth Championships | Donetsk, Ukraine | 2nd | 800 m | 1:48.29 |
| 2014 | World Junior Championships | Eugene, Oregon, United States | 18th (h) | 800m | 1:50.19 |
| 2015 | European Team Championships Super League | Cheboksary, Russia | 4th | 800 m | 1:46.42 |
| 2015 | European Junior Championships | Eskilstuna, Sweden | 2nd | 800 m | 1:49.00 |
| 2015 | European Junior Championships | Eskilstuna, Sweden | 1st | 4 × 400 m relay | 3:08.35 |
| 2015 | World Championships | Beijing, China | 18th (sf) | 800 m | 1:48.32 |
