= Robert Heppenstall =

Canadian middle-distance runner (born 1997)

Personal information
- Born: 28 February 1997 (age 29) Hamilton, Ontario, Canada
- Height: 6 ft 0 in (183 cm)
- Weight: 165 lb (75 kg)

Sport
- Sport: Track, cross country
- Event(s): 1500 meters, 800 metres, mile
- College team: Wake Forest

Achievements and titles
- Personal best(s): 800 meters: 1:46.04; 1500 meters: 3:35.17 mile: 3:55.15
Medal record
Men's athletics
Representing Canada
Pan American Games
Silver medal – second place	2023 Santiago	1500 m
Pan American Junior Athletics Championships
Gold medal – first place	2015 Edmonton	Men's 800m
- Updated on November 17, 2022

Robert Heppenstall (born February 28, 1997) is a professional Canadian middle-distance track and field athlete. Competing for Canada at the 2015 Pan American Junior Athletics Championships, Heppenstall won silver in the men's 800 metres. A 7x All American in the 800m, Heppenstall is a two-time Canadian national champion in 800m and 1500m.

== Running career ==
Heppenstall started participating in track and field for St. Thomas More Catholic Secondary School in Hamilton, Ontario. During his high school career he was a four-time high school track and field MVP (Most Valuable Player award), as well as four-time OFSAA gold medalist, and three-time Canadian national champion in the 800m. Heppenstall earned Athletics Ontario Distance Athlete of the Year honors in 2014 and 2015.

Heppenstall competed in Track and Field as well as Cross-Country for Wake Forest in Winston-Salem, N.C. In his freshman year Heppenstall broke the university and the ACC championships record, setting a new Canadian junior indoor 800m record with a time of 1:47.35. In 2015 he became Junior Pan American Games silver medalist in the 800m; in 2016 he finished 3rd at the 2016 IAAF World U20 Championships – Men's 800 metres. The following years, Heppenstall won bronze at the 2018 NCAA Division I Indoor Track and Field Championships as well as bronze at the 2019 Championship.

Since turning professional, Heppenstall became two-time Canadian national champion in the 800m and 1500m (2021 and 2022). In 2023, Heppenstall won a silver medal in the 1500m at the Pan American Games in Santiago. In 2025, he competed as a semi-finalist in the 800m at the World Athletics Indoor Championships.
