= 2026 European Athletics Championships – Men's 1500 metres =

Men's 1500 metres at the 2026 European Athletics Championships
- Venue: Alexander Stadium
- Location: Birmingham, United Kingdom
- Dates: 14 August 2026 (round 1); 15 August 2026 (final)
- Competitors: 30 (target)
- Winning time: 3:35.70

Medalists
gold medal	Stefan Nillessen	Netherlands
silver medal	Samuel Pihlström	Sweden
bronze medal	Andrew Coscoran	Ireland

Official Video Replay

The men's 1500 metres at the 2026 European Athletics Championships took place over two rounds at the Alexander Stadium in Birmingham, United Kingdom, on 14 and 15 August 2026.

== Background ==
Records before the 2026 European Athletics Championships
Record	Athlete (nation)	Time	Location	Date
World record	Hicham El-Guerrouj (MAR)	3:26.00	Rome, Italy	14 July 1998
European record	Jakob Ingebrigtsen (NOR)	3:26.73	Fontvieille, Monaco	12 July 2024
Championship record	Jakob Ingebrigtsen (NOR)	3:31.95	Rome, Italy	12 June 2024
World leading	Josh Kerr (GBR)	3:27.62+	London, United Kingdom	18 July 2026
European leading	Josh Kerr (GBR)	3:27.62+	London, United Kingdom	18 July 2026

== Qualification ==
For the men's 1500 metres, the qualification period was from 27 July 2025 to 26 July 2026. Athletes qualified by running the entry standard of 3:33.50 min or faster, by wildcard for the 2024 European Athletics Champion (not used since Jakob Ingebrigtsen chose not to participate), or by their position on the World Athletics Rankings for the event. The target number was 30 athletes (eventually 31 were selected).

Qualification standings per 31 July 2026
QP	CP	Country	Athlete	Status	Details
1	1	France	Azeddine Habz	Qualified by Entry Standard	3:29.80 - Stade Charléty, Paris (FRA) - 28 JUN 2026
2	1	Great Britain & N.I.	Jake Wightman	Qualified by Entry Standard	3:29.95 - Stade Charléty, Paris (FRA) - 28 JUN 2026
3	1	Germany	Robert Farken	Qualified by Entry Standard	3:30.09 - Olympic Stadium, London (GBR) - 18 JUL 2026
4	1	Norway	Narve Gilje Nordås	Qualified by Entry Standard	3:30.26 - TSV Stadion, Pfungstadt (GER) - 20 AUG 2025
5	1	Portugal	Isaac Nader	Qualified by Entry Standard	3:30.43 - Complexe Sportif Prince Moulay Abdellah, Rabat (MAR) - 31 MAY 2026
6	1	Sweden	Samuel Pihlström	Qualified by Entry Standard	3:31.15 - Letzigrund, Zürich (SUI) - 28 AUG 2025
7	2	France	Paul Anselmini	Qualified by Entry Standard	3:31.36 - Stade Charléty, Paris (FRA) - 28 JUN 2026
8	3	France	Titouan Le Grix	Qualified by Entry Standard	3:31.46 - Stade Charléty, Paris (FRA) - 28 JUN 2026
9	2	Portugal	José Carlos Pinto	Qualified by Entry Standard	3:31.47 - Nemzeti Atlétikai Központ, Budapest (HUN) - 14 JUL 2026
10	1	Netherlands	Samuel Chapple	Qualified by Entry Standard	3:31.65 - Moselstadion, Trier (GER) - 02 SEP 2025
11	1	Ireland	Andrew Coscoran	Qualified by Entry Standard	3:31.65 - Complexe Sportif Prince Moulay Abdellah, Rabat (MAR) - 31 MAY 2026
12	1	Spain	Adrián Ben	Qualified by Entry Standard	3:31.70 - TSV Stadion, Pfungstadt (GER) - 20 AUG 2025
13	2	Great Britain & N.I.	Jake Heyward	Qualified by Entry Standard	3:31.81 - Olympic Stadium, London (GBR) - 18 JUL 2026
14	1	Italy	Pietro Arese	Qualified by Entry Standard	3:31.87 - Nemzeti Atlétikai Központ, Budapest (HUN) - 14 JUL 2026
reserve	4	France	Romain Mornet	Qualified by Entry Standard	3:32.08 - Stade Raymond Petit, Tomblaine (FRA) - 03 JUL 2026
15	1	Belgium	Ruben Verheyden	Qualified by Entry Standard	3:32.38 - Complexe Sportif Prince Moulay Abdellah, Rabat (MAR) - 31 MAY 2026
16	2	Netherlands	Stefan Nilessen	Qualified by Entry Standard	3:32.45 - Stade Charléty, Paris (FRA) - 28 JUN 2026
17	3	Great Britain & N.I.	Arlo Ludewick	Qualified by Entry Standard	3:32.92 - Olympic Stadium, London (GBR) - 18 JUL 2026
reserve	4	Great Britain & N.I.	Thomas Keen	Qualified by Entry Standard	3:32.94 - Olympic Stadium, London (GBR) - 18 JUL 2026
18	2	Belgium	Pieter Sisk	Qualified by Entry Standard	3:33.30 - Boudewijnstadion, Bruxelles (BEL) - 22 AUG 2025
19	1	Austria	Raphael Pallitsch	Qualified by Entry Standard	3:33.41 - Nemzeti Atlétikai Központ, Budapest (HUN) - 14 JUL 2026
20	3	Belgium	Jochem Vermeulen	Qualified by Entry Standard	3:33.42 - Boudewijnstadion, Bruxelles (BEL) - 22 AUG 2025
21	2	Spain	Ignacio Fontes	Qualified by Entry Standard	3:33.42 - Stade d'Athletisme Pierre Voillequin, Troyes (FRA) - 28 JUN 2026
22	1	Armenia	Yervand Mkrtchyan	Qualified by Universality Place	
23	3	Spain	Carlos Sáez	Qualified by World Rankings	26th - 1227 points
reserve	4	Spain	Mariano García	Qualified by World Rankings	28th - 1223 points
24	2	Ireland	Cathal Doyle	Qualified by World Rankings	30th - 1222 points
reserve	5	Spain	Martín Segurola	Qualified by World Rankings	34th - 1202 points
25	2	Italy	Joao Bussotti Neves	Qualified by World Rankings	35th - 1200 points
26	3	Portugal	Nuno Pereira	Qualified by World Rankings	36th - 1198 points
27	1	Poland	Filip Ostrowski	Qualified by World Rankings	37th - 1197 points
28	2	Germany	Marc Tortell	Qualified by World Rankings	39th - 1195 points
29	1	Turkey	Salih Teksöz	Qualified by World Rankings	40th - 1192 points
30	2	Norway	Andreas Fjeld Halvorsen	Qualified by World Rankings	41st - 1192 points
31	1	Israel	Matan Ivri	Qualified by World Rankings	44th - 1189 points
reserve	2	Turkey	Mehmet Çelik	Next best by World Rankings	47th - 1189 points
reserve	1	Andorra	Pol Moya	Next best by World Rankings	49th - 1187 points
reserve	1	Slovenia	Rok Markelj	Next best by World Rankings	57th - 1165 points
reserve	1	Finland	Joonas Rinne	Next best by World Rankings	59th - 1162 points
reserve	2	Finland	Santtu Heikkinen	Next best by World Rankings	64th - 1158 points
reserve	3	Norway	Moa Abounnachat Bollerød	Next best by World Rankings	67th - 1149 points
reserve	1	Croatia	Nino Jambrešić	Next best by World Rankings	69th - 1147 points
reserve	3	Italy	Simone Valduga	Next best by World Rankings	76th - 1139 points

Bye to semi-finals	Reserve activated	Withdrawal / reserve unused

== Schedule ==
Date	Time	Round
14 August 2026	12:05	Round 1
15 August 2026	21:07	Final

All times are local times (UTC+1)

== Results ==
=== Round 1 ===
Round 1 was held on 14 August 2026, at 12:05 in the afternoon. First 6 in each heat (Q) advanced to the final.

==== Heat 1 ====
Place	Athlete	Nation	Time	Notes
1	Jake Heyward	Great Britain & N.I.	3:35.49	Q
2	Isaac Nader	Portugal	3:35.67	Q
3	Azeddine Habz	France	3:36.06	Q
4	Stefan Nilessen	Netherlands	3:36.07	Q
5	Narve Gilje Nordås	Norway	3:36.17	Q
6	Arlo Ludewick	Great Britain & N.I.	3:36.27	Q
7	Paul Anselmini	France	3:36.84	
8	Matan Ivri	Israel	3:36.93	
9	Ruben Verheyden	Belgium	3:38.19	
10	Filip Ostrowski	Poland	3:38.70	
11	Joao Bussotti Neves	Italy	3:39.01	
12	Marc Tortell	Germany	3:42.21	
13	Pieter Sisk	Belgium	3:44.67	
14	Carlos Sáez	Spain	3:55.49	
15	Cathal Doyle	Ireland	4:36.28	

==== Heat 2 ====
Place	Athlete	Nation	Time	Notes
1	Jake Wightman	Great Britain & N.I.	3:41.57	Q
2	Robert Farken	Germany	3:41.65	Q
3	Samuel Pihlström	Sweden	3:41.84	Q
4	Andrew Coscoran	Ireland	3:41.86	Q
5	Pietro Arese	Italy	3:41.94	Q
6	Romain Mornet	France	3:41.95	Q
7	José Carlos Pinto	Portugal	3:42.11	
8	Adrián Ben	Spain	3:42.52	
9	Raphael Pallitsch	Austria	3:42.55	
10	Samuel Chapple	Netherlands	3:42.72	
11	Salih Teksöz	Turkey	3:42.99	
12	Jochem Vermeulen	Belgium	3:43.41	
13	Nuno Pereira	Portugal	3:43.74	
14	Mariano García	Spain	3:44.99	
15	Yervand Mkrtchyan	Armenia	3:51.60	
16	Andreas Fjeld Halvorsen	Norway	3:51.70	

=== Final ===
The final was held on 15 August 2026, at 21:07 in the evening.

Place	Athlete	Nation	Time	Notes
1st place, gold medalist(s)	Stefan Nilessen	Netherlands	3:35.70	
2nd place, silver medalist(s)	Samuel Pihlström	Sweden	3:36.16	
3rd place, bronze medalist(s)	Andrew Coscoran	Ireland	3:36.24	
4	Jake Heyward	Great Britain & N.I.	3:36.40	
5	Arlo Ludewick	Great Britain & N.I.	3:36.65	
6	Jake Wightman	Great Britain & N.I.	3:37.18	
7	Narve Gilje Nordås	Norway	3:37.31	
8	Romain Mornet	France	3:37.37	
9	Robert Farken	Germany	3:37.49	
10	Azeddine Habz	France	3:37.61	
11	Pietro Arese	Italy	3:38.15	
12	Isaac Nader	Portugal	3:39.69	
