= 2026 World Athletics Indoor Championships – Men's 1500 metres =

Men's 1500 metres at the 2026 World Athletics Indoor Championships
- Venue: Kujawsko-Pomorska Arena Toruń
- Location: Toruń, Poland
- Dates: 20 March (round 1); 22 March (final)
- Winning time: 3:39.63

Medalists
gold medal	Mariano García	Spain
silver medal	Isaac Nader	Portugal
bronze medal	Adam Spencer	Australia

The men's 1500 metres at the 2026 World Athletics Indoor Championships took place on the short track of the Kujawsko-Pomorska Arena Toruń in Toruń, Poland, on 20 and 22 March 2026. This was the 22nd time the event was contested at the World Athletics Indoor Championships. Athletes could qualify by achieving the entry standard or by their World Athletics Ranking in the event.

== Background ==
The men's 1500 metres was contested 21 times before 2026, at every previous edition of the World Athletics Indoor Championships.

Records before the 2026 World Athletics Indoor Championships
Record	Athlete (nation)	Time (s)	Location	Date
World record	Jakob Ingebrigtsen (NOR)	3:29.63	Liévin, France	13 February 2025
Championship record	Samuel Tefera (ETH)	3:32.77	Belgrade, Serbia	20 March 2022
2026 World Lead	Cole Hocker (USA)	3:30.80	Salem, United States	14 February 2026

== Qualification ==
For the men's 1500 metres, the qualification period ran from 1 November 2025 until 8 March 2026. Athletes could qualify by achieving the entry standard of 3:36.00 s. Athletes could also qualify by virtue of their World Athletics Ranking for the event or by virtue of their World Athletics Indoor Tour wildcard. There is a target number of 30 athletes.

== Results ==
=== Round 1 ===
Round 1 was held on 20 March, starting at 18:54 (UTC+1) in the evening. Qualification: First 3 of each heat (Q) qualify to Final.

Place	Athlete	Nation	Time	Notes
1	Federico Riva	Italy	3:40.52	Q
2	Adam Spencer	Australia	3:40.79	Q
3	Nathan Green	United States	3:40.97	Q
4	Romain Mornet	France	3:41.68	
5	Robert Farken	Germany	3:41.79	
6	Pieter Sisk	Belgium	3:42.45	
7	James McMurray	Great Britain	3:42.51	
8	Eduardo Herrera	Mexico	3:42.70	
9	Rok Markelj	Slovenia	3:45.08	
10	Aldin Ćatović	Serbia	3:48.51	

==== Heat 2 ====
Place	Athlete	Nation	Time	Notes
1	Samuel Pihlström	Sweden	3:43.38	Q
2	Isaac Nader	Portugal	3:43.58	Q
3	Carlos Sáez	Spain	3:43.75	Q
4	Luke Houser	United States	3:43.87	
5	Jochem Vermeulen	Belgium	3:44.55	
6	Pol Moya	Andorra	3:44.68	
7	Jack Higgins	Great Britain	3:44.75	
8	Aaron Ahl	Canada	3:45.11	
9	James Gormley	Ireland	3:50.71	
10	Samat Kazakbaev	Kyrgyzstan	3:57.37	SB

==== Heat 3 ====
Place	Athlete	Nation	Time	Notes
1	Mariano García	Spain	3:38.19	Q
2	Titouan Le Grix	France	3:38.92	Q
3	Samuel Chapple	Netherlands	3:39.03	Q
4	Foster Malleck	Canada	3:39.05	
5	Håkon Moe Berg	Norway	3:39.29	
6	Žan Rudolf	Slovenia	3:40.20	
7	Festus Lagat	Kenya	3:40.26	
8	Pietro Arese	Italy	3:40.91	
9	Kamil Herzyk	Poland	3:44.31	
10	Camden Gilmore	Paraguay	3:47.13	

=== Final ===
The final was held on 22 March, starting at 18:38 (UTC+1) in the evening.

Place	Athlete	Nation	Time	Notes
1st place, gold medalist(s)	Mariano García	Spain	3:39.63	
2nd place, silver medalist(s)	Isaac Nader	Portugal	3:40.06	
3rd place, bronze medalist(s)	Adam Spencer	Australia	3:40.26	
4	Samuel Pihlström	Sweden	3:40.59 [.582]	
5	Samuel Chapple	Netherlands	3:40.59 [.586]	
6	Nathan Green	United States	3:40.78	
7	Federico Riva	Italy	3:40.98	
8	Carlos Sáez	Spain	3:42.46	
9	Titouan Le Grix	France	3:42.69	
