= Athletics at the 2026 Commonwealth Games – Men's mile =

Men's Mile at the 2026 Commonwealth Games
- Venue: Scotstoun Stadium, Glasgow
- Dates: 29 July (round 1); 1 August (final)
- Winning time: 3:54.12

Medalists
gold medal	Josh Kerr	Scotland
silver medal	Cameron Myers	Australia
bronze medal	Timothy Cheruiyot	Kenya

The men's mile at the 2026 Commonwealth Games, as part of the athletics programme, took place at the Scotstoun Stadium from 29 July to 1 August 2026. The mile, branded as the "Commonwealth Mile" returned to the programme for the first time since the last pre-metrification edition of the event, the 1966 Games. The mile replaces the 1500 metres event for able-bodies men and women, but para athletics events in the 1500 metres T20 and T54 classes will continue.

The event was won by the new world record holder in the mile, and home athlete Josh Kerr. In echoes of the "Miracle Mile", the 1954 championship race which inspired the decision to bring the imperial distance back to the Games, the Scotsman led home an Australian, Cameron Myers, with Kenya's Timothy Cheruiyot coming through for bronze.

== Records ==
Prior to this competition, the existing world and Commonwealth record for the mile is as follows:

Men's Mile run
World record	3:42.66	Josh Kerr (SCO)	18 Jul 2026	London, England
Commonwealth record	3:42.66	Josh Kerr (SCO)	18 Jul 2026	London, England
Games record	3:55.34	Kip Keino (KEN)	13 August 1966	Kingston, Jamaica

== Schedule ==
The schedule is as follows:

Date	Time	Round
29 July 2026	11:10	Round 1
1 August 2026	20:55	Final

All times are United Kingdom time (UTC+1)

== Results ==
=== Round 1 ===
Round 1 took place on the morning of 29 July 2026. First 6 in each heat (Q) advanced to the final.

==== Heat 1 ====
Place	Athlete	Nation	Time	Notes
1	Josh Kerr	Scotland	3:58.57	Q
2	Timothy Cheruiyot	Kenya	3:58.98	Q
3	Sam Tanner	New Zealand	3:59.31	Q
4	Thomas Keen	England	3:59.34	Q
5	Tshepo Tshite	South Africa	3:59.52	Q
6	Adam Spencer	Australia	3:59.72	Q
7	Max Davies	Canada	4:01.42	
8	Aaron Ahl	Canada	4:03.30	
9	Oliver Hoare	Australia	4:06.84	qR
10	Domenic Krop	Uganda	4:07.63	
11	Josephat Gisemo	Tanzania	4:09.86	
12	Yeshnil Karan	Fiji	4:12.28	
13	Brandon Adolphus	Belize	DNF	

==== Heat 2 ====
Place	Athlete	Nation	Time	Notes
1	Cameron Myers	Australia	3:53.85	Q GR
2	Jake Wightman	Scotland	3:54.05	Q
3	Jake Heyward	Wales	3:54.18	Q
4	Brian Komen	Kenya	3:54.94	Q
5	Foster Malleck	Canada	3:55.12	Q
6	Tshepiso Masalela	Botswana	3:57.11	Q
7	Silas Chemutai	Uganda	3:57.32	
8	Archie Davis	England	3:57.98	
9	Neil Gourley	Scotland	4:01.45	
10	James Gormley	Northern Ireland	4:04.40	
11	Daniel Sinda	Tanzania	4:08.24	
12	Jiuteis Robinson	Papua New Guinea	4:19.14	
13	Reynold Cheruiyot	Kenya	DNF	

=== Final ===
The final of the men's Commonwealth Mile took place on the evening of 1 August 2026.

Place	Athlete	Nation	Time	Notes
1st place, gold medalist(s)	Josh Kerr	Scotland	3:54.12	
2nd place, silver medalist(s)	Cameron Myers	Australia	3:55.26	
3rd place, bronze medalist(s)	Timothy Cheruiyot	Kenya	3:55.41	
4	Jake Heyward	Wales	3:55.54	
5	Oliver Hoare	Australia	3:56.28	
6	Jake Wightman	Scotland	3:56.36	
7	Foster Malleck	Canada	3:56.46	
8	Adam Spencer	Australia	3:56.62	SB
9	Sam Tanner	New Zealand	3:56.63	
10	Tshepo Tshite	South Africa	3:57.43	SB
11	Thomas Keen	England	3:57.60	
12	Tshepiso Masalela	Botswana	3:58.89	
13	Brian Komen	Kenya	3:59.33	
