= Athletics at the 2023 African Games – Men's 1500 metres =

Men's 1500 metres at the 2023 African Games
- Venue: Legon Sports Stadium
- Location: Accra, Ghana
- Dates: 21 March (heats); 22 March (final)
- Competitors: 19 from 14 nations
- Winning time: 3:39.19

Medalists
gold medal	Brian Komen	Kenya
silver medal	Ermiyas Girma	Ethiopia
bronze medal	Abel Kipsang	Kenya

The men's 1500 metres event at the 2023 African Games was held on 21 and 22 March 2024 in Accra, Ghana.

== Results ==
=== Heats ===
Qualification: First 4 in each heat (Q) and the next 4 fastest (q) advanced to the final.

Rank	Heat	Name	Nationality	Time	Notes
1	2	Ermiyas Girma	Ethiopia	3:40.97	Q
2	2	Yobiel Weldrufael	Eritrea	3:41.10	Q
3	2	Abel Kipsang	Kenya	3:41.20	Q
4	2	Ronald Musagala	Uganda	3:41.49	Q
5	2	Abdelatif Sadiki	Morocco	3:42.19	q
6	2	Éric Nzikwinkunda	Burundi	3:42.70	q
7	2	Waberie Egueh Houssein	Djibouti	3:42.98	q, NU18R
8	2	Abraham Guem	South Sudan	3:43.45	q
9	1	Wegene Addisu	Ethiopia	3:47.45	Q
10	1	Brian Komen	Kenya	3:47.58	Q
11	1	Assefa Zenebe	Ethiopia	3:48.99	Q
12	1	Riadh Chninni	Tunisia	3:49.48	Q
13	1	Abraham Guot Thon	South Sudan	3:53.28	
14	1	Alla Mohamed Eljurni	Libya	3:54.42	
15	1	Jean De Dieu Butoyi	Burundi	3:55.17	
16	2	Hamid Sambo	Nigeria	3:56.00	
17	1	Mahmoud Ethmane	Mauritania	4:03.28	
18	2	Hamidou Diarra	Mali	4:05.70	
19	1	Kalie Sesay	Sierra Leone	4:13.92	
	1	Mayanja Salim Abu	Uganda	DNS	
	1	Kelvin Chiku	Zimbabwe	DNS	
	2	Kadri Amed Sayf	Tunisia	DNS	

=== Final ===
Rank	Name	Nationality	Time	Notes
1st place, gold medalist(s)	Brian Komen	Kenya	3:39.19	
2nd place, silver medalist(s)	Ermiyas Girma	Ethiopia	3:39.40	
3rd place, bronze medalist(s)	Abel Kipsang	Kenya	3:39.45	
4	Wegene Addisu	Ethiopia	3:39.54	
5	Abraham Guem	South Sudan	3:41.05	
6	Éric Nzikwinkunda	Burundi	3:41.27	
7	Ronald Musagala	Uganda	3:41.67	
8	Abdelatif Sadiki	Morocco	3:41.94	
9	Waberie Egueh Houssein	Djibouti	3:43.61	
10	Assefa Zenebe	Ethiopia	3:43.85	
	Yobiel Weldrufael	Eritrea	DNF	
	Riadh Chninni	Tunisia	DNS	
