= Athletics at the 2025 Summer World University Games – Men's 1500 metres =

Men's 1500 metres at the 2025 Summer World University Games
- Venue: Lohrheidestadion
- Location: Bochum, Germany
- Dates: 22 July (heats); 24 July (final)
- Competitors: 39 from 31 nations
- Winning time: 3:46.10

Medalists
gold medal	Filip Ostrowski	Poland
silver medal	Titouan Le Grix	France
bronze medal	Samuel Charig	Great Britain

The men's 1500 metres event at the 2025 Summer World University Games was held in Bochum, Germany, at Lohrheidestadion on 22 and 24 July.

== Records ==
Prior to the competition, the records were as follows:

Record	Athlete (nation)	Time (s)	Location	Date
Games record	Saïd Aouita (MAR)	3:38.43	Bucharest, Romania	22 July 1981

== Results ==
=== Heats ===
First 4 in each heat (Q) qualified for the final.

==== Heat 1 ====
Place	Athlete	Nation	Time	Notes
1	Titouan le Grix	France	3:43.87	Q
2	Mehmet Celik	Turkey	3:44.01	Q
3	Jonathan Podbielski	Canada	3:44.16	Q
4	Harrison Witt	United States	3:44.22	Q
5	Alex Melloy	Great Britain	3:45.62	
6	Kiyoto Ono	Japan	3:47.27	
7	Arjun Waskale	India	3:47.36	
8	Anže Svit Požgaj	Slovenia	3:48.84	
9	Mohammed al-Suleimani	Oman	3:48.98	
10	Collins Kiprotich	Kenya	3:50.81	
11	Daniel Herrera	Colombia	3:51.29	PB
12	Jonas Bertelsen	Denmark	3:53.19	PB
13	Edreen Tenywa	Uganda	4:07.76	

==== Heat 2 ====
Place	Athlete	Nation	Time	Notes
1	Nuno Pereira	Portugal	3:44.07	Q
2	Samuel Charig	Great Britain	3:44.32	Q
3	Keanu Domingo	South Africa	3:45.54	Q
4	Adam Goddard	Australia	3:45.66	Q
5	Cameron Ponder	United States	3:46.77	
6	Kjetil Brenno Gagnås	Norway	3:47.19 [.190]	
6	Hinata Maeda	Japan	3:47.19 [.190]	
8	Lucas Jiménez	Ecuador	3:49.12	PB
9	Olefile Kooagile	Botswana	3:53.11	
10	Francisco Zufiaurre	Argentina	3:54.95	PB
11	Maxim Frolowskij	Kazakhstan	3:58.87	
12	Jonathan Musunga	Zambia	4:00.44	
13	Khalid Muhibullah	Bangladesh	5:08.30	

==== Heat 3 ====
Place	Athlete	Nation	Time	Notes
1	Filip Ostrowski	Poland	3:42.97	Q
2	Pol Oriach	Spain	3:43.08	Q
3	Sigurd Tveit	Norway	3:43.88	Q
4	Luan Munnik	South Africa	3:44.43	Q
5	Leonard Markén	Finland	3:44.84	
6	Max Shervington	Australia	3:45.37	
7	Alec Purnell	Canada	3:46.23	
8	Nikita Bogdanovs	Latvia	3:46.66	
9	Kalev Hõlpus	Estonia	3:46.99	PB
10	Jesper Sandberg	Sweden	3:51.06	SB
11	Johnson Ayesiga	Uganda	3:54.30	
12	Mark Mahinay	Philippines	3:55.07	SB
13	Arji Genka	Nigeria	4:40.40	

=== Final ===
Place	Athlete	Nation	Time	Notes
1st place, gold medalist(s)	Filip Ostrowski	Poland	3:46.10	
2nd place, silver medalist(s)	Titouan le Grix	France	3:46.32	
3rd place, bronze medalist(s)	Samuel Charig	Great Britain	3:46.62	
4	Pol Oriach	Spain	3:46.85	
5	Mehmet Celik	Turkey	3:46.93	
6	Nuno Pereira	Portugal	3:47.12	
7	Jonathan Podbielski	Canada	3:47.50	
8	Harrison Witt	United States	3:48.18	
9	Adam Goddard	Australia	3:49.02	
10	Keanu Domingo	South Africa	3:49.07	
11	Luan Munnik	South Africa	3:49.15	
12	Sigurd Tveit	Norway	4:00.83	
