= Mariano García =

Mariano García may refer to:

- Mariano García (runner), Spanish middle-distance runner
- Mariano García Remón, Spanish footballer and coach
- Mariano García (musician), Argentinean experimental singer-songwriter
- Mariano García Muñoz, Spanish ambassador
