= 2021 European Athletics U23 Championships – Men's 1500 metres =

Men's 1500 metres at the 2021 European Athletics U23 Championships
- Venue: Kadriorg Stadium, Tallinn
- Dates: 8, 10 July
- Competitors: 33 from 19 nations
- Winning time: 3:40.03

Medalists
gold medal	Ruben Verheyden	Belgium
silver medal	Mario García	Spain
bronze medal	Isaac Nader	Portugal

The men's 1500 metres event at the 2021 European Athletics U23 Championships was held in Tallinn, Estonia, at Kadriorg Stadium on 8 and 10 July.

== Records ==
Prior to the competition, the records were as follows:

European U23 record	Jakob Ingebrigtsen (NOR)	3:28.68	Monaco	14 August 2020
Championship U23 record	Wolfram Müller (GER)	3:38.94	Amsterdam, Netherlands	14 July 2001

== Results ==
=== Round 1 ===
Qualification rule: First 4 in each heat (Q) and the next 3 fastest (q) advance to the Final.

Rank	Heat	Name	Nationality	Time	Notes
1	3	Isaac Nader	Portugal	3:44.27	Q
2	1	George Mills	Great Britain	3:44.32	Q
3	3	Nesim Amsellek	Italy	3:44.45	Q
4	1	Enrique Herreros	Spain	3:44.62	Q
5	3	Bastien Augusto	France	3:44.74	Q
6	2	Joshua Lay	Great Britain	3:44.90	Q
7	2	Mario García	Spain	3:44.93	Q
8	3	Ruben Verheyden	Belgium	3:44.95	Q
9	1	Illia Karnavukhau	Belarus	3:45.05	Q
10	2	Nuno Pereira	Portugal	3:45.15	Q
11	3	Carlos Sáez	Spain	3:45.24	q
12	1	Samuel Pihlström	Sweden	3:45.32	Q
13	3	Elzan Bibić	Serbia	3:45.37	q
14	1	Elon Abergel	Israel	3:45.51	q
15	2	Job Ijtsma	Netherlands	3:45.53	Q
16	1	Thomas Vanoppen	Belgium	3:45.91	qJ
17	3	Ruben Querinjean	Luxembourg	3:46.31	
18	3	Tiarnan Crorken	Great Britain	3:46.31	
19	2	Louis Vandermessen	Belgium	3:46.47	
20	2	Julien Stalhandske	Switzerland	3:46.75	
21	1	Josselain Barrellon-Vernay	France	3:47.22	
22	3	Bram Anderiessen	Netherlands	3:47.31	
23	1	William Devantier	Denmark	3:48.31	
24	3	Martin Prodanov	Bulgaria	3:48.36	
25	1	Charlie O'Donovan	Ireland	3:49.66	
26	2	Abubakar Abdullahi	Sweden	3:50.72	
27	2	Matteo Guelfo	Italy	3:51.75	
28	3	Sven Wagner	Germany	3:52.60	
29	1	Robin van Riel	Netherlands	3:53.49	qJ
30	2	Szymon Żywko	Poland	3:55.39	
31	2	Vladyslav Kovalenko	Ukraine	3:56.27	
	1	Pietro Arese	Italy	DQ	TR17.3.2
	2	Flavien Szot	France	DQ	TR17.2.2

=== Final ===
Rank	Name	Nationality	Time	Notes
1st place, gold medalist(s)	Ruben Verheyden	Belgium	3:40.03	
2nd place, silver medalist(s)	Mario García	Spain	3:40.11	
3rd place, bronze medalist(s)	Isaac Nader	Portugal	3:40.58	
4	Elzan Bibić	Serbia	3:40.91	SB
5	George Mills	Great Britain	3:40.91	
6	Nesim Amsellek	Italy	3:40.94	
7	Thomas Vanoppen	Belgium	3:41.06	
8	Joshua Lay	Great Britain	3:41.29	
9	Enrique Herreros	Spain	3:42.08	
10	Nuno Pereira	Portugal	3:42.11	
11	Robin van Riel	Netherlands	3:42.64	
12	Carlos Sáez	Spain	3:44.00	
13	Illia Karnavukhau	Belarus	3:44.34	
14	Samuel Pihlström	Sweden	3:44.39	
15	Job Ijtsma	Netherlands	3:45.62	
16	Bastien Augusto	France	3:47.86	
17	Elon Abergel	Israel	3:48.56	
