= Athletics at the 2019 African Games – Men's 800 metres =

Athletic event

The men's 800 metres event at the 2019 African Games was held on 26, 27 and 28 August in Rabat.

== Medalists ==
| Gold | Silver | Bronze |
|---|---|---|
| Abdessalem Ayouni; Tunisia | Cornelious Kipkoech Tuwei; Kenya | Nabil Oussama; Morocco |

== Results ==
=== Heats ===
Qualification: First 3 in each heat (Q) and the next 4 fastest (q) advanced to the semifinals.

| Rank | Heat | Name | Nationality | Time | Notes |
|---|---|---|---|---|---|
| 1 | 3 | Abel Kipsang Bele | Kenya | 1:48.34 | Q |
| 2 | 3 | Nabil Oussama | Morocco | 1:48.48 | Q |
| 3 | 3 | Salim Abu Mayanja | Uganda | 1:48.54 | Q |
| 4 | 3 | Riadh Chninni | Tunisia | 1:48.59 | q |
| 5 | 3 | Hamada Ahmed | Egypt | 1:48.98 | q |
| 6 | 2 | Abdessalem Ayouni | Tunisia | 1:50.05 | Q |
| 7 | 2 | Tshepo Tshite | South Africa | 1:50.12 | Q |
| 8 | 1 | Eric Nzikwinkunda | Burundi | 1:50.21 | Q |
| 9 | 2 | Mohamed Belbachir | Algeria | 1:50.23 | Q |
| 10 | 2 | Nicholas Kiplangat Kipkoech | Kenya | 1:50.26 | q |
| 11 | 4 | Mouad Zahafi | Morocco | 1:50.27 | Q |
| 12 | 2 | Mostafa Smaili | Morocco | 1:50.29 | q |
| 13 | 1 | Cornelious Kipkoech Tuwei | Kenya | 1:50.36 | Q |
| 14 | 1 | Edose Ibadin | Nigeria | 1:50.46 | Q |
| 15 | 1 | Semere Mihret | Eritrea | 1:50.54 | |
| 16 | 1 | Adisu Girma | Ethiopia | 1:50.73 | |
| 17 | 4 | Tshepiso Masalela | Botswana | 1:50.77 | Q |
| 18 | 1 | Boitumelo Masilo | Botswana | 1:50.89 | |
| 19 | 3 | Nyasha Mutsetse | Zimbabwe | 1:51.34 | |
| 20 | 4 | Edrissa Marong | Gambia | 1:51.55 | Q |
| 21 | 4 | Omer Amano | Ethiopia | 1:52:54 | |
| 22 | 2 | Prosper Niyonkuru | Burundi | 1:53.16 | |
| 23 | 4 | Benjamín Enzema | Equatorial Guinea | 1:53.50 | |
| 24 | 2 | Diarra Hamidou | Mali | 1:54.51 | |
| 25 | 4 | Kevin Bobando | Republic of the Congo | 1:55.01 | |
| 26 | 2 | Bacha Morka | Ethiopia | 1:55.22 | |
| 27 | 4 | Jean Bertrand Vielleuse | Mauritius | 1:55.29 | |
| 28 | 3 | Abdirashid Yusuf Ali | Somalia | 1:55.66 | |
| 29 | 1 | Gilberto Leite | São Tomé and Príncipe | 1:59.32 | |
| | 1 | Francky Mbotto | Central African Republic | DNF | |
| | 3 | Dex Dex | Athlete Refugee Team | DNS | |

=== Semifinals ===
Qualification: First 4 in each semifinal (Q) advanced directly to the final.

| Rank | Heat | Name | Nationality | Time | Notes |
|---|---|---|---|---|---|
| 1 | 1 | Abel Kipsang Bele | Kenya | 1:47.91 | Q |
| 2 | 1 | Mohamed Belbachir | Algeria | 1:48.12 | Q |
| 3 | 1 | Mostafa Smaili | Morocco | 1:48.23 | Q |
| 4 | 1 | Cornelious Kipkoech Tuwei | Kenya | 1:48.35 | Q |
| 5 | 1 | Riadh Chninni | Tunisia | 1:48.43 | |
| 6 | 2 | Abdessalem Ayouni | Tunisia | 1:48.51 | Q |
| 7 | 2 | Nabil Oussama | Morocco | 1:48.76 | Q |
| 8 | 2 | Tshepiso Masalela | Botswana | 1:48.92 | Q |
| 9 | 2 | Nicholas Kiplangat Kipkoech | Kenya | 1:48.93 | Q |
| 10 | 2 | Salim Abu Mayanja | Uganda | 1:49.04 | |
| 11 | 1 | Eric Nzikwinkunda | Burundi | 1:49.14 | |
| 12 | 2 | Tshepo Tshite | South Africa | 1:49.17 | |
| 13 | 2 | Mouad Zahafi | Morocco | 1:49.18 | |
| 14 | 2 | Edose Ibadin | Nigeria | 1:49.37 | |
| 15 | 1 | Hamada Ahmed | Egypt | 1:50.10 | |
| 16 | 1 | Edrissa Marong | Gambia | 1:51.76 | |

=== Final ===
| Rank | Name | Nationality | Time | Notes |
|---|---|---|---|---|
| 1st place, gold medalist(s) | Abdessalem Ayouni | Tunisia | 1:45.17 | NR |
| 2nd place, silver medalist(s) | Cornelious Kipkoech Tuwei | Kenya | 1:45.41 | |
| 3rd place, bronze medalist(s) | Nabil Oussama | Morocco | 1:45.42 | |
| 4 | Abel Kipsang Bele | Kenya | 1:45.43 | |
| 5 | Mostafa Smaili | Morocco | 1:45.73 | |
| 6 | Nicholas Kiplangat Kipkoech | Kenya | 1:46.08 | |
| 7 | Mohamed Belbachir | Algeria | 1:46.10 | |
| 8 | Tshepiso Masalela | Botswana | 1:46.82 | |
