= Brian Komen =

Kenyan athlete (born 1998)

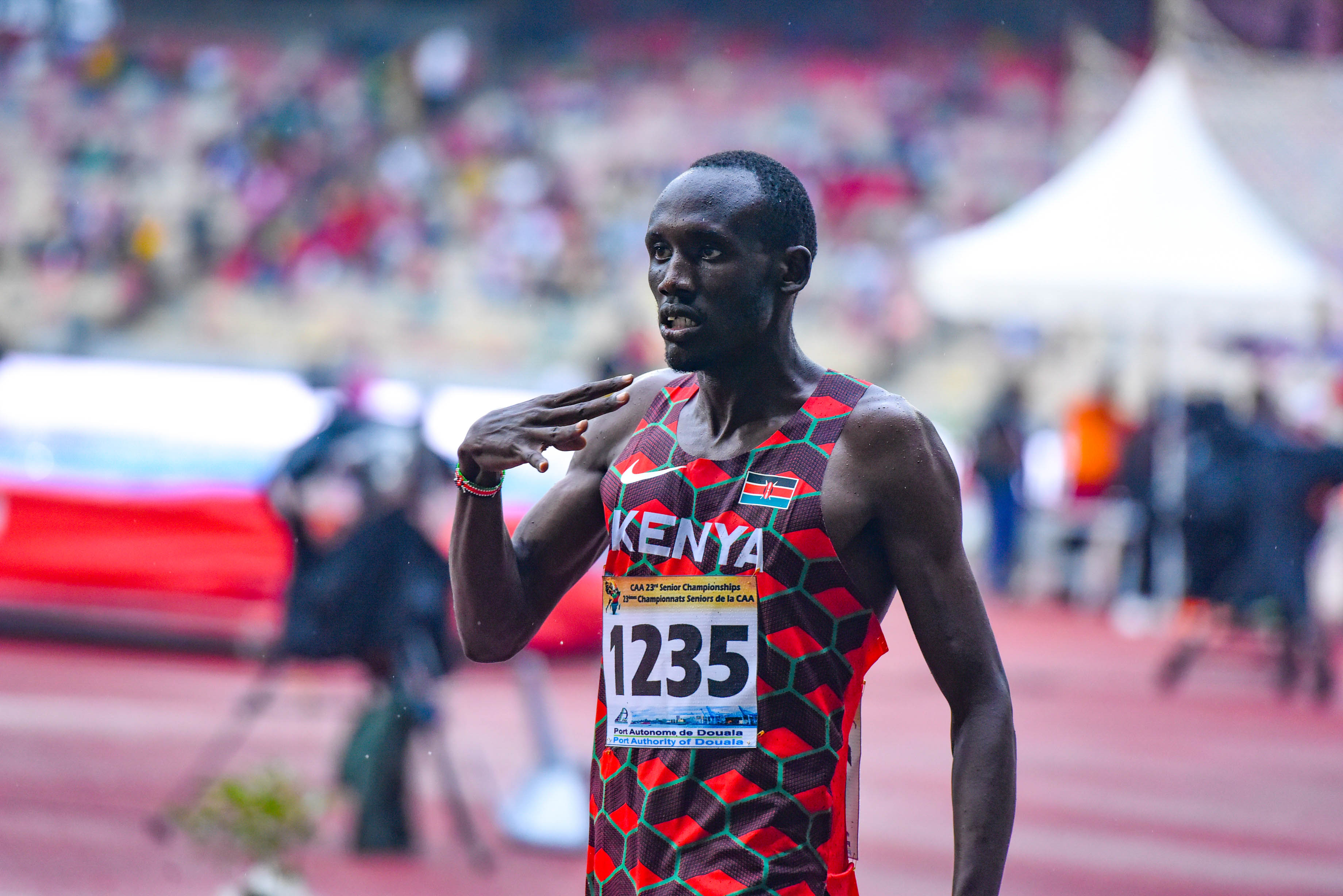

Personal information
- Nationality: Kenyan
- Born: 10 August 1998 (age 28) Chebara, Nakuru County, Kenya

Sport
- Sport: Athletics
- Event: 1500m

Achievements and titles
- Personal bests: 1500m: 3:28.80 (Monaco, 2024)
Medal record
Men's athletics
Representing Kenya
African Games
Gold medal – first place	2023 Accra	1500 m
African Championships
Gold medal – first place	2024 Douala	1500 m
Bronze medal – third place	2026 Accra	1500 m
World Road Running Championships
Bronze medal – third place	2026 Copenhagen	Mile mixed team

Brian Komen (born 10 August 1998) is a Kenyan middle-distance runner. He was a gold medalist at the 2023 African Games over 1500 metres.

== Biography ==
In April 2024, Komen ran a personal best for 1500 metres in Nairobi of 3:32.29.

Competing indoors in 2024, he finished runner-up at the Sparkassen Indoor Meeting in Dortmund over 1500 metres, before finishing eighth and fourth respectively at the Czech Indoor Gala in Prague and at the Metz Moselle Athleor in France. His time of 3:37.42 in Metz was an indoors personal best.

Komen won the Kenyan African Games national trials, beating Abel Kipsang into second place in Nairobi in a time of 3:38.26. On 22 March 2024, he was a gold medalist over 1500 metres at the 2023 African Games in Accra in a time of 3:39.19. On 20 April 2024, he was the runner-up over 1500 metres at the Kip Keino Classic in Kenya. In May 2024, he won the 1500 metres at the 2024 Doha Diamond League event. On 12 July 2024, he ran a personal best 3:28.80 for the 1500 metres at the 2024 Herculis Diamond League event in Monaco. He competed at the 2024 Summer Olympics over 1500 metres, placing twelfth in the final.

He finished third in the 1500 metres at the Kenyan World Championships Trials in July 2025.

In May 2026, he won the bronze medal over 1500 metres at the 2026 African Championships in Athletics in Accra, Ghana, behind Luan Munnik of South Africa. In June, he placed third in the 1500 m at the Kenyan Championships. He was a finalist in the mile at the 2026 Commonwealth Games in Glasgow, Scotland. Competing in the mile run at the World Athletics Road Running Championships on 19 September 2026, Komen was the leading Kenyan man, and won the bronze medal in the mixed team competition.
