= 2026 African Championships in Athletics – Men's 1500 metres =

Men's 1500 metres at the 2026 African Championships in Athletics
- Venue: Legon Sports Stadium
- Location: Accra, Ghana
- Dates: 16–17 May
- Competitors: 16 from 11 nations
- Winning time: 3:42.19

Medalists
gold medal	Luan Munnik	South Africa
silver medal	Tshepo Tshite	South Africa
bronze medal	Brian Komen	Kenya

The men's 1500 metres event at the 2026 African Championships in Athletics was held on 16 and 17 May in Accra, Ghana.

== Results ==
=== Heats ===
First 6 of each heat (Q) qualified directly for the final.

Rank	Heat	Athlete	Nationality	Time	Notes
1	1	Tshepo Tshite	South Africa	3:47.68	Q
2	1	Dominic Kiptoo Barngetuny	Kenya	3:47.91	Q
3	1	Dabra Nassir	Eritrea	3:48.49	Q
4	1	Ashenafi Emana	Ethiopia	3:49.06	Q
5	1	Endashaw Reta	Ethiopia	3:49.17	Q
6	1	Tom Dradriga	Uganda	3:49.27	Q
7	1	Fabrice Iradukunda	Burundi	3:49.31	
8	1	Sylvain Azonhin	Benin	3:51.09	
9	1	Mayibongwe Vilakati	Eswatini	3:56.56	
10	1	Aden Hassan Abdifatah	ART	3:57.05	
11	2	Luan Munnik	South Africa	4:01.50	Q
12	2	Brian Komen	Kenya	4:01.53	Q
13	2	Fithawi Zaid	Eritrea	4:01.91	Q
14	2	Vincent Kibet	Kenya	4:02.05	Q
15	2	Makman Yoagbati	Togo	4:05.16	Q
16	2	Gyang James	Nigeria	4:06.64	Q
	1	Adam Mohamed Abdulkadir	Somalia	DNS	
	2	Omar Hussein Ahmed	Somalia	DNS	
	2	Abraham Guem	South Sudan	DNS	
	2	Abdessalem Ayouni	Tunisia	DNS	

=== Final ===
Rank	Athlete	Nationality	Time	Notes
1st place, gold medalist(s)	Luan Munnik	South Africa	3:42.19	
2nd place, silver medalist(s)	Tshepo Tshite	South Africa	3:42.31	
3rd place, bronze medalist(s)	Brian Komen	Kenya	3:43.19	
4	Dominic Kiptoo Barngetuny	Kenya	3:43.38	
5	Dabra Nassir	Eritrea	3:44.15	
6	Vincent Kibet	Kenya	3:47.91	
7	Endashaw Reta	Ethiopia	3:50.59	
8	Ashenafi Emana	Ethiopia	3:50.66	
9	Tom Dradriga	Uganda	3:53.00	
10	Makman Yoagbati	Togo	3:57.25	
	Fithawi Zaid	Eritrea	DNS	
	Gyang James	Nigeria	DNS	
