= Samuel Charig =

British middle-distance runner (born 2001)

Personal information
- Born: 21 November 2001 (age 24)

Sport
- Sport: Athletics
- Event: Middle-distance running,

Achievements and titles
- Personal best(s): 800m: 1:46.18 (Watford, 2025); 1500m: 3:35.69 (Poznan, 2025)
Medal record
Men's athletics
Representing Great Britain
Summer World University Games
Bronze medal – third place	2025 Bochum	1500 m

Samuel Charig (born 21 November 2001) is a British middle-distance runner. He was the bronze medalist over 1500 metres at the 2025 Summer World University Games and also placed third at the 2025 UK Athletics Championships over 1500 metres.

== Career ==
He is a member of City of Portsmouth athletics club. In January 2020 as a junior athlete, he was runner-up to Henry McLuckie at the Hampshire U20 Cross Country Championships.

He won the mile run at the 2024 Loughborough International with a personal best time of 4:09.25.

Charig won the IFAM Outdoor Meet in Brussels in June 2025 and then produced a third personal best over 1500m in as many weeks running 3:37.21 at the BMC Grand Prix in Birmingham, the following week. In July, he set a new personal best finishing second over 1500 metres at the Czesław Cybulski Memorial in Poland in 3:35.69. The next week he lowered his 800 metres personal best to 1:46.18 at the British Milers Club Grand Prix in Watford. He was named in the British team for the 2025 Summer World University Games in Germany, where he won the bronze medal in the men's 1500 metres race.

He finished third over 1500 metres at the 2025 UK Athletics Championships in Birmingham, finishing behind Elliot Giles and Neil Gourley.

== Personal life ==
Charig attended St Mary’s University, Twickenham.
