= 2024 World Athletics Cross Country Championships – Mixed relay =

Senior mixed relay race at the 2024 World Athletics Cross Country Championships
- Organisers: World Athletics
- Edition: 45th
- Date: March 30, 2024
- Host city: Belgrade, Serbia
- Events: 1
- Distances: 8 km – Senior mixed relay
- Participation: 52 athletes from 13 nations

The Senior mixed relay race at the 2024 World Athletics Cross Country Championships was held at Belgrade, Serbia, on March 30, 2024. Reynold Cheruiyot, Virginia Nyambura Nganga, Kyumbe Munguti, and Purity Chepkirui from Kenya won the gold medal by 28 seconds over Ethiopia's team.

The distance was approximately 2000 metres per leg, with a mandated ordering of man, woman, man, woman similar to the mixed 4 × 400 metres relay. Each athlete completed one lap of the course including all obstacles, and exchanged a wristband rather than a standard relay baton. The total distance was about 8000 metres.

== Results ==
Mixed Cross Country Relay
Place	Athlete	Country	Time
1st place, gold medalist(s)	Reynold Cheruiyot; Virginia Nyambura Nganga; Kyumbe Munguti; Purity Chepkirui	Kenya	22:15
2nd place, silver medalist(s)	Taresa Tolosa; Dahdi Dube; Adihana Kasaye; Birri Abera	Ethiopia	22:43
3rd place, bronze medalist(s)	Thomas Keen; Alexandra Millard; Adam Fogg; Bethan Morley	Great Britain	23:00
4	Hafid Rizqy; Rahma Tahiri; Hicham Akankam; Kaoutar Farkoussi	Morocco	23:08
5	Hosea Kiprop; Linda Chebet; Sam Kapkureny Kiprotich; Knight Aciru	Uganda	23:10
6	Nicolas-Marie Daru; Charlotte Mouchet; Romain Mornet; Flavie Renouard	France	23:17
7	Yutaro Niinae; Nozomi Tanaka; Naoki Takada; Yuya Sawada	Japan	23:18
8	Kasey Knevelbaard; Ella Donaghu; Johnathan Reniewicki; Katie Izzo	United States	23:21
9	Christopher Swart; Danielle Verster; Boikanyo Motlhamme; Simonay Weitsz	South Africa	23:37
10	Elzan Bibić; Milica Tomašević; Nikola Raičević; Teodora Simović	Serbia	24:31
11	César Gómez; Margarita Hernández; Emmanuel Reyes; Miranda Duran	Mexico	25:06
12	Maxim Frolowskij; Tatyana Neroznak; Vadim Levchenkov; Aqbajan Nurmamjet	Kazakhstan	25:31
13	Evueli Toia; Adi Fulori Masau; Vishant Reddy; Adi Ama Masau	Fiji	28:51
