= 2026 London Athletics Meet =

Athletics meeting in London, United Kingdom

- Dates: 18 July 2026
- Host city: London
- Venue: London Stadium
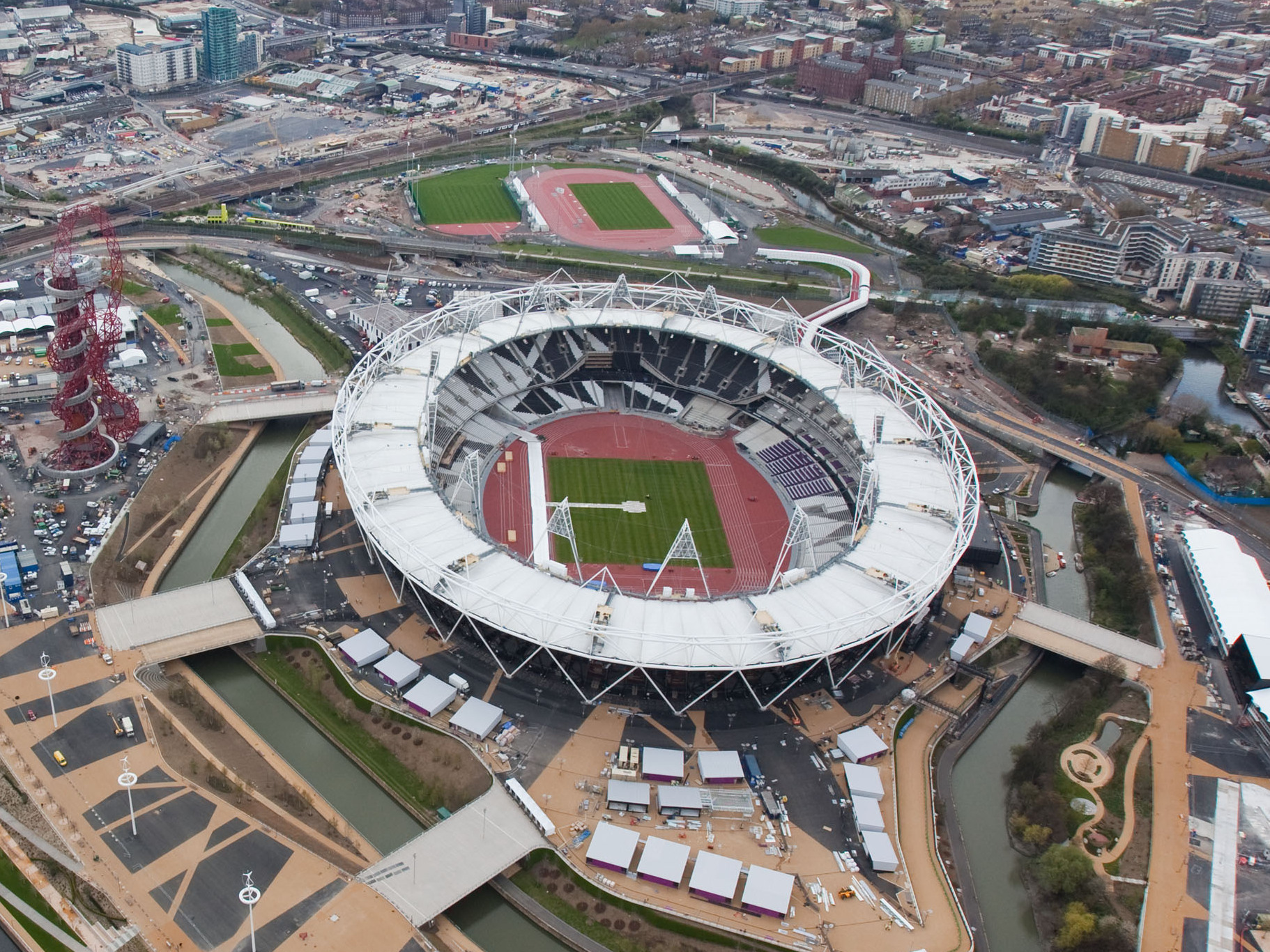
- Level: 2026 Diamond League
- Events: 14 diamond disciplines
- Records set: 1 World Record

The 2026 London Athletics Meet was the 73rd edition of the annual outdoor track and field meeting held in London. Held on 18 July at London Stadium, it was the eleventh leg of the 2026 Diamond League – the highest level international track and field circuit.

== Diamond+ events results ==
=== Men's ===
100 Metres
Place	Athlete	Nation	Time	Points	Notes
1st place, gold medalist(s)	Kanyinsola Ajayi	Nigeria	9.84	8	=NR
2nd place, silver medalist(s)	Oblique Seville	Jamaica	9.87	7	
3rd place, bronze medalist(s)	Romell Glave	Great Britain	9.97	6	PB
4	Emmanuel Eseme	Cameroon	9.97	5	
5	Gift Leotlela	South Africa	9.99	4	
6	Jordan Anthony	United States	9.99	3	
7	Zharnel Hughes	Great Britain	10.02	2	
8	Jeremiah Azu	Great Britain	10.07	1	
			Wind: (−0.7 m/s)		

Mile
Place	Athlete	Nation	Time	Points	Notes
1st place, gold medalist(s)	Josh Kerr	Great Britain	3:42.66	8	WR
2nd place, silver medalist(s)	Yared Nuguse	United States	3:45.69	7	SB
3rd place, bronze medalist(s)	Jake Heyward	Great Britain	3:46.73	6	PB
4	Robert Farken	Germany	3:46.82	5	NR
5	Nathan Green	United States	3:48.05	4	PB
6	Arlo Ludewick	Great Britain	3:48.17	3	PB
7	Ethan Strand	United States	3:49.13	2	
8	Thomas Keen	Great Britain	3:49.33	1	PB
9	Sam Prakel	United States	3:49.63		PB
10	Archie Davis	Great Britain	3:51.09		PB
—	Mohamed Abdilaahi	Germany	DNF		
—	Simeon Birnbaum	United States	DNF		
—	Brannon Kidder	United States	DNF		PM
—	Žan Rudolf	Slovenia	DNF		PM

400 Metres hurdles
Place	Athlete	Nation	Time	Points	Notes
1st place, gold medalist(s)	Karsten Warholm	Norway	46.61	8	MR, WL
2nd place, silver medalist(s)	Emil Agyekum	Germany	47.45	7	NR
3rd place, bronze medalist(s)	Abderrahman Samba	Qatar	48.10	6	
4	Ezekiel Nathaniel	Nigeria	48.30	5	
5	Matheus Lima	Brazil	48.33	4	
6	Alastair Chalmers	Great Britain	48.81	3	
7	Caleb Dean	United States	50.45	2	

Pole vault
Place	Athlete	Nation	Height	Points	Notes
1st place, gold medalist(s)	Sam Kendricks	United States	5.95 m	8	SB
2nd place, silver medalist(s)	Armand Duplantis	Sweden	5.95 m	7	
3rd place, bronze medalist(s)	Kurtis Marschall	Australia	5.95 m	6	
4	Emmanouil Karalis	Greece	5.95 m	5	
5	Sondre Guttormsen	Norway	5.85 m	4	
6	Renaud Lavillenie	France	5.60 m	3	
6	Menno Vloon	Netherlands	5.60 m	3	
8	Owen Heard	Great Britain	5.60 m	1	
9	Chris Nilsen	United States	5.60 m		

=== Women's ===
200 Metres
Place	Athlete	Nation	Time	Points	Notes
1st place, gold medalist(s)	Julien Alfred	Saint Lucia	21.66	8	MR
2nd place, silver medalist(s)	Gabby Thomas	United States	21.81	7	
3rd place, bronze medalist(s)	Shaunae Miller-Uibo	Bahamas	22.24	6	
4	Dina Asher-Smith	Great Britain	22.28	5	SB
5	Amy Hunt	Great Britain	22.30	4	SB
6	Success Eduan	Great Britain	22.53	3	
7	Anavia Battle	United States	22.55	2	
8	Cambrea Sturgis	United States	22.57	1	
			Wind: (+0.1 m/s)		

400 Metres
Place	Athlete	Nation	Time	Points	Notes
1st place, gold medalist(s)	Marileidy Paulino	Dominican Republic	48.97	8	
2nd place, silver medalist(s)	Henriette Jæger	Norway	49.15	7	NR
3rd place, bronze medalist(s)	Stacey-Ann Williams	Jamaica	49.52	6	
4	Nickisha Pryce	Jamaica	50.09	5	
5	Natalia Bukowiecka	Poland	50.10	4	=SB
6	Roxana Gómez	Cuba	50.14	3	
7	Yemi Mary John	Great Britain	50.24	2	
8	Charlotte Henrich	Great Britain	50.45	1	PB

800 Metres
Place	Athlete	Nation	Time	Points	Notes
1st place, gold medalist(s)	Keely Hodgkinson	Great Britain	1:56.21	8	
2nd place, silver medalist(s)	Femke Broeders-Bol	Netherlands	1:56.46	7	
3rd place, bronze medalist(s)	Tsige Duguma	Ethiopia	1:56.92	6	SB
4	Sarah Billings	Australia	1:58.16	5	
5	Jemma Reekie	Great Britain	1:58.60	4	
6	Isabelle Boffey	Great Britain	1:58.85	3	
7	Addison Wiley	United States	2:00.01	2	
—	Shafiqua Maloney	Saint Vincent and the Grenadines	DNF		PM

Long jump
Place	Athlete	Nation	Distance	Points	Notes
1st place, gold medalist(s)	Malaika Mihambo	Germany	7.05 m (+1.2 m/s)	8	SB
2nd place, silver medalist(s)	Claire Bryant	United States	6.94 m (+1.2 m/s)	7	SB
3rd place, bronze medalist(s)	Larissa Iapichino	Italy	6.82 m (+0.3 m/s)	6	
4	Hilary Kpatcha	France	6.72 m (−0.2 m/s)	5	
5	Agate de Sousa	Portugal	6.67 m (+1.4 m/s)	4	
6	Lucy Hadaway	Great Britain	6.64 m (+1.3 m/s)	3	
7	Ramona Elena Verman	Romania	6.62 m (±0.0 m/s)	2	
8	Jazmin Sawyers	Great Britain	6.53 m (+1.1 m/s)	1	

== Diamond events results ==
=== Men's ===
400 Metres
Place	Athlete	Nation	Time	Points	Notes
1st place, gold medalist(s)	Rai Benjamin	United States	44.05	8	PB
2nd place, silver medalist(s)	Matthew Hudson-Smith	Great Britain	44.18	7	
3rd place, bronze medalist(s)	Jacory Patterson	United States	44.25	6	
4	Jereem Richards	Trinidad and Tobago	44.63	5	
5	Lee Eppie	Botswana	44.71	4	
6	Khaleb McRae	United States	44.90	3	
7	Vernon Norwood	United States	44.97	2	
8	Ben Jefferies	Great Britain	45.30	1	

800 Metres
Place	Athlete	Nation	Time	Points	Notes
1st place, gold medalist(s)	Brandon Miller	United States	1:42.19	8	PB
2nd place, silver medalist(s)	Mark English	Ireland	1:42.97	7	PB
3rd place, bronze medalist(s)	Max Burgin	Great Britain	1:43.30	6	
4	Emmanuel Wanyonyi	Kenya	1:43.31	5	
5	Ben Pattison	Great Britain	1:43.34	4	SB
6	Peter Bol	Australia	1:43.60	3	SB
7	Cian McPhillips	Ireland	1:43.97	2	SB
8	Tobias Grønstad	Norway	1:44.58	1	
9	Alex Botterill	Great Britain	1:44.71		
10	Bryce Hoppel	United States	1:45.32		
—	Patryk Sieradzki	Poland	DNF		PM

110 Metres hurdles
Place	Athlete	Nation	Time	Points	Notes
1st place, gold medalist(s)	Ja'Kobe Tharp	United States	12.89	8	MR
2nd place, silver medalist(s)	Kendry Menéndez	Cuba	13.01	7	PB
3rd place, bronze medalist(s)	Trey Cunningham	United States	13.12	6	
4	Jamal Britt	United States	13.16	5	
5	Cordell Tinch	United States	13.17	4	
6	Orlando Bennett	Jamaica	13.21	3	
7	Demario Prince	Jamaica	13.27	2	
8	Sam Bennett	Great Britain	13.53	1	
			Wind: (+0.3 m/s)		

=== Women's ===
3000 Metres
Place	Athlete	Nation	Time	Points	Notes
1st place, gold medalist(s)	Jessica Hull	Australia	8:24.69	8	
2nd place, silver medalist(s)	Rose Davies	Australia	8:25.38	7	
3rd place, bronze medalist(s)	Sarah Healy	Ireland	8:25.63	6	
4	Hannah Nuttall	Great Britain	8:26.48	5	
5	Fantaye Belayneh	Ethiopia	8:26.98	4	
6	Linden Hall	Australia	8:27.16	3	
7	Georgia Griffith	Australia	8:27.94	2	
8	Medina Eisa	Ethiopia	8:27.99	1	
9	Hawi Abera	Ethiopia	8:28.00		
10	Marta Alemayo	Ethiopia	8:29.09		AU20R
11	Laura Muir	Great Britain	8:31.77		
12	Hirut Meshesha	Ethiopia	8:32.04		
13	Nozomi Tanaka	Japan	8:32.29		NR
14	Megan Keith	Great Britain	8:32.58		
15	Marta García	Spain	8:34.80		
15	Eloise Walker	Great Britain	8:34.80		
17	Innes FitzGerald	Great Britain	8:35.42		
18	Margaret Akidor	Kenya	8:37.45		
19	Lauren Ryan	Australia	8:41.85		
—	Vera Sjöberg	Sweden	DNF		PM

High jump
Place	Athlete	Nation	Height	Points	Notes
1st place, gold medalist(s)	Nicola Olyslagers	Australia	2.01 m	8	
2nd place, silver medalist(s)	Yaroslava Mahuchikh	Ukraine	2.01 m	7	
3rd place, bronze medalist(s)	Eleanor Patterson	Australia	1.96 m	6	
4	Maria Żodzik	Poland	1.96 m	5	
5	Angelina Topić	Serbia	1.96 m	4	
6	Lamara Distin	Jamaica	1.93 m	3	
7	Marija Vuković	Montenegro	1.85 m	2	
8	Morgan Lake	Great Britain	1.85 m	1	

Discus throw
Place	Athlete	Nation	Distance	Points	Notes
1st place, gold medalist(s)	Cierra Jackson	United States	71.72 m	8	DLR, PB
2nd place, silver medalist(s)	Valarie Sion	United States	68.39 m	7	
3rd place, bronze medalist(s)	Jorinde van Klinken	Netherlands	67.99 m	6	
4	Vanessa Kamga	Sweden	65.30 m	5	SB
5	Alida van Daalen	Netherlands	64.22 m	4	
6	Laulauga Tausaga	United States	63.15 m	3	
7	Shanice Craft	Germany	60.37 m	2	
8	Zara Obamakinwa	Great Britain	59.42 m	1	

== National events results ==
=== Men's ===
800 Metres
Place	Athlete	Nation	Time	Notes
1st place, gold medalist(s)	Jack Higgins	Great Britain	1:45.15	SB
2nd place, silver medalist(s)	Henry Jonas	Great Britain	1:45.26	SB
3rd place, bronze medalist(s)	Justin Davies	Great Britain	1:45.99	SB
4	Callum Dodds	Great Britain	1:46.32	SB
5	David Race	Great Britain	1:46.41	SB
6	Harry Ross-Hughes	Great Britain	1:46.64	SB
7	Reece Sharman-Newell	Great Britain	1:47.20	
8	Henry Fisher	Great Britain	1:47.26	SB
9	William Sean Rabjohns	Great Britain	1:47.55	SB
10	Thomas Randolph	Great Britain	1:47.57	SB
—	Ben Claridge	Great Britain	DNF	PM

=== Women's ===
400 Metres
Place	Athlete	Nation	Time	Notes
1st place, gold medalist(s)	Emily Newnham	Great Britain	50.32	PB
2nd place, silver medalist(s)	Lina Nielsen	Great Britain	50.61	PB
3rd place, bronze medalist(s)	Nicole Yeargin	Great Britain	50.98	=SB
4	Poppy Malik	Great Britain	52.07	SB
5	Rebecca Grieve	Great Britain	52.46	SB
6	Natasha Harrison	Great Britain	52.58	
7	Alicia Regis	Great Britain	52.60	SB

== See also ==
- 2026 Diamond League
