= Mario García (runner) =

Spanish middle-distance runner

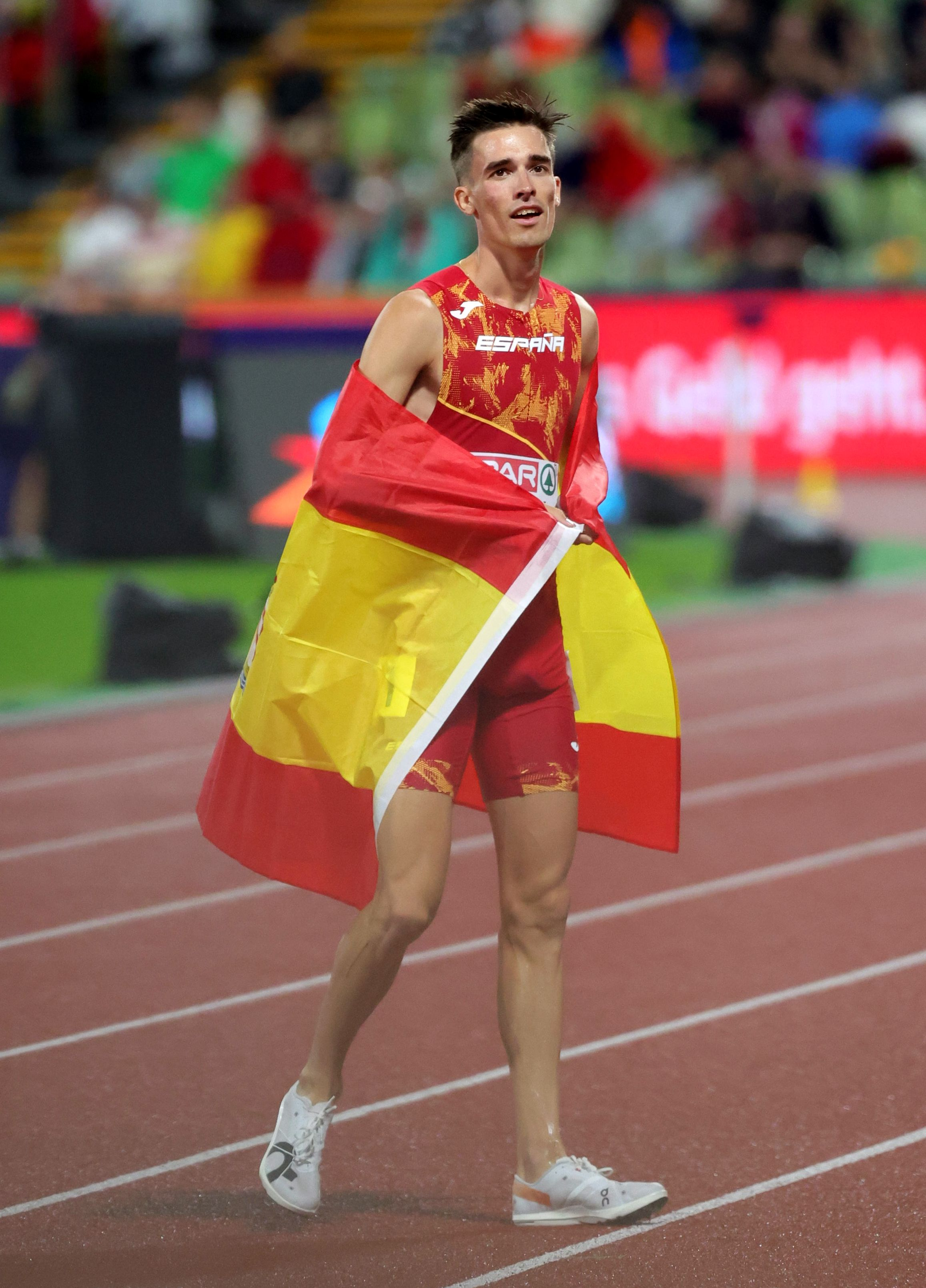

Personal information
- Full name: Mario García Romo
- Nickname: "The Rocket"
- Born: 29 June 1999 (age 27) Salamanca, Spain
- Height: 183 cm (6 ft 0 in)
- Weight: 64 kg (141 lb)

Sport
- Country: Spain
- Sport: Middle-distance running
- Event: 1500 metres
- University team: Ole Miss Rebels
- Club: On Athletics Club
- Turned pro: 2022
- Coached by: Dathan Ritzenhein
Medal record
Men's athletics
Representing Spain
European Championships
Bronze medal – third place	2022 Munich	1500 m
European U23 Championships
Silver medal – second place	2021 Tallinn	1500 m

Mario García Romo (Note: In this Spanish name, the first or paternal surname is García and the second or maternal family name is Romo.) (born 29 June 1999) is a Spanish middle-distance runner, who specializes in the 1500 metres. He was the national champion in the event in 2022, and he represented Spain in the 1500 m at the 2022 and 2023 World Championships, finishing fourth and sixth.

García competed collegiately for the University of Mississippi, where he won a national title in the mile at the 2022 NCAA Division I Indoor Track and Field Championships. After graduating in 2022, he joined the On Athletics Club as a professional runner for On Running.

== Early life and collegiate competition ==
García hails from Villar de Gallimazo, a small town in Spain with a population of 200. He relocated to the United States in 2018 to attend the University of Mississippi, pursuing a degree in chemistry. While at the university, he competed in the National Collegiate Athletics Association (NCAA). His older brother, Jamie, also participated in NCAA athletics for Eastern Kentucky University.

While at the University of Mississippi, García was a 7-time NCAA Division I All-American and 6-time Southeastern Conference champion in cross country and track. He won a national title in the indoor mile at the 2022 NCAA Indoor Track and Field Championships, running 4:07.54 to narrowly edge Morgan Beadlescomb for the win. He was runner-up in the 1500 m at the 2022 NCAA Outdoor Track and Field Championships. While still a student, García was also the silver medalist in the 1500 m at the 2021 European Athletics U23 Championships.

== Professional ==
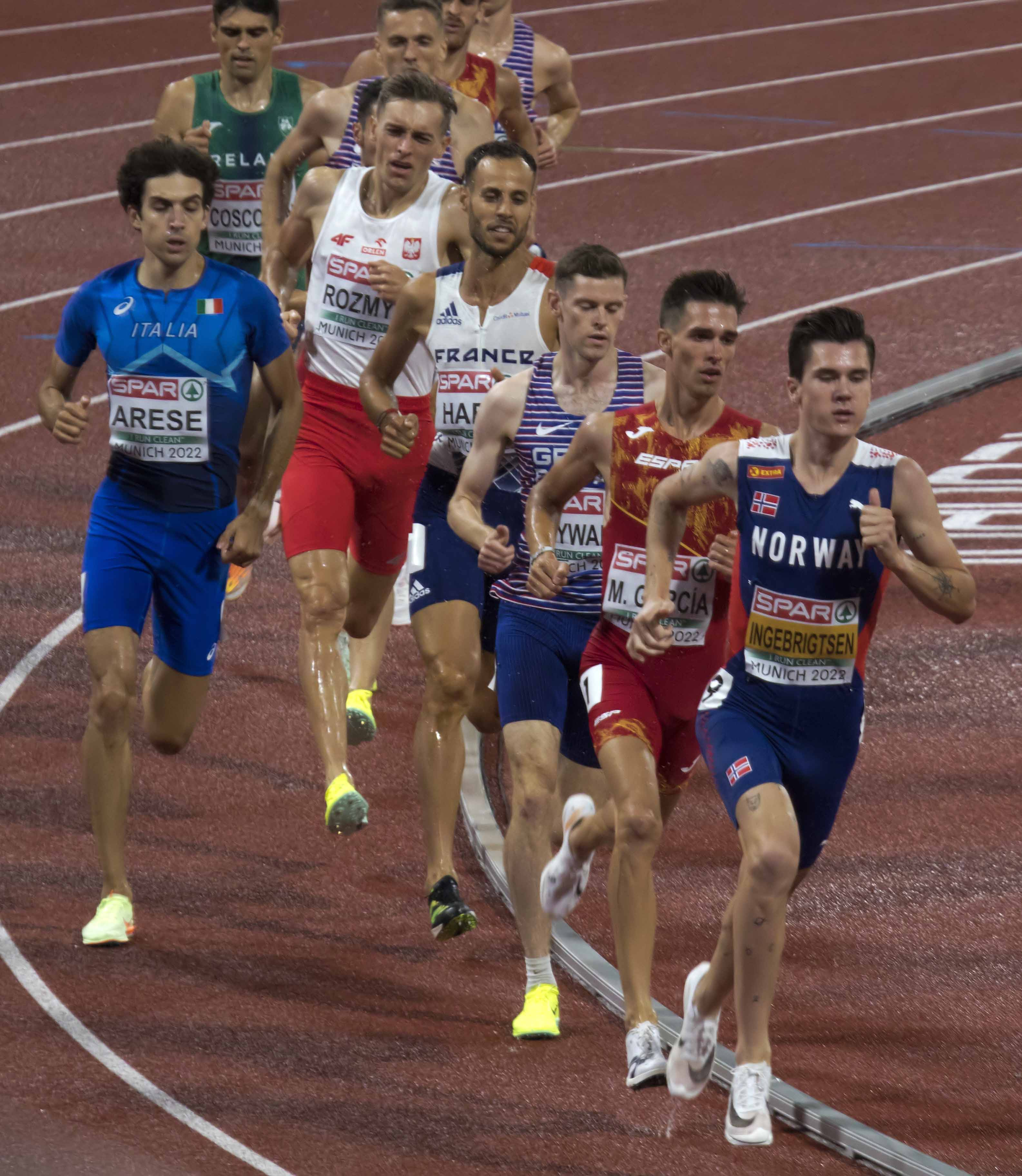
García (second from right) competes in the 1500 m at the 2022 European Athletics Championships.

=== 2022 ===
After graduating college, García relocated to Boulder, Colorado to train under coach Dathan Ritzenhein as part of the On Athletics Club. At the Spanish National Championships, García won the 1500 meters in 3:35.52, qualifying him for the 2022 World Athletics Championships in Eugene, Oregon, where he finished fourth in the final. Later that year, he earned a bronze medal in the 1500 m at the European Athletics Championships.

=== 2023 ===
On the 15 June, García set a personal best of 3:29.18 in the 1500 m at the Bislett Grames to finish fifth. The following month, he placed third in the Spanish Championships, qualifying him for the 2023 World Championships in Budapest. On 23 August, he finished sixth in the 1500 final of these championships in 3:30.26. The following month, on 8 September, García set a national record over 2000 m with his time of 4:49.85. The Spaniard ran his last track race of the year at the Prefontaine Classic, contesting the mile. He finished fourth in 3:47.69.

== Achievements ==
All information from World Athletics profile.

=== International competitions ===
Year	Competition	Venue	Position	Event	Time
Representing Spain
2017	European U20 Championships	Grosseto, Italy	9th	1500 m	3:58.89
2018	World U20 Championships	Tampere, Finland	22nd (h)	1500 m	3:52.70
2021	European U23 Championships	Tallinn, Estonia	2nd	1500 m	3:40.11
2022	World Championships	Eugene, United States	4th	1500 m	3:30.20
2022	European Championships	Munich, Germany	3rd	1500 m	3:34.88
2023	World Championships	Budapest, Hungary	6th	1500 m	3:30.26
2024	World Indoor Championships	Glasgow, United Kingdom	11th	1500 m	3:40.48
2024	European Championships	Rome, Italy	19th (h)	1500 m	3:44.30
2024	Olympic Games	Paris, France	11th (repechage)	1500 m	3:37.01

=== Personal bests ===
Outdoor

- 800 m: 1:46.90 (Oxford, MS 2022)
- 1500 m: 3:29.18 (Oslo 2023)
- Mile: 3:47.69 (Eugene, OR)
- 2000 m: 4:49.85 (Brussels, Belgium 2023) NR
- 3000 m: 7:47.56 (Nashville 2022)
- 5000 m: 13:56.69 (Memphis 2020)

Indoor

- 1500 m: 3:35.98 (New York City 2023)
- Mile: 3:51.79 (New York 2023) NR
- 3000 m: 7:34.74 (Boston, MA 2023)

=== NCAA ===
Statistics sourced from athlete's profile on Track & Field Results Reporting System (TFRRS).

Year	Competition	Venue	Position	Event	Notes
Representing Ole Miss Rebels
2022	NCAA Division I Outdoor Track and Field Championships	Eugene, Oregon	2nd	1500m	3:45.69
2022	NCAA Division I Indoor Track and Field Championships	Birmingham, Alabama	1st	Mile	4:07.54
2021	2021 NCAA Division I Cross Country Championships	Tallahassee, Florida	46th	10 km	29:36.1
2021	NCAA Division I Outdoor Track and Field Championships	Eugene, Oregon	5th	1500m	3:38.66
2021	2020 NCAA Division I Cross Country Championships	Stillwater, Oklahoma	30th	10 km	30:35.2
2021	NCAA Division I Indoor Track and Field Championships	Fayetteville, Arkansas	2nd	DMR	9:20.75
2021	NCAA Division I Indoor Track and Field Championships	Fayetteville, Arkansas	3rd	3000	7:48.59
2019	NCAA Division I Cross Country Championship	Terre Haute, Indiana	111th	10 km	32:04.2
2019	NCAA Division I Outdoor Track and Field Championships	Austin, Texas	90th	1500m	3:59.50
2019	NCAA Division I Indoor Track and Field Championships	Birmingham, Alabama	8th	DMR	9:35.45
2018	NCAA Division I Cross Country Championship	Madison, Wisconsin	154th	10 km	31:04.5
