= Luan Munnik =

South African middle-distance runner (born 2000)

Personal information
- Full name: Johannes Lodewicus Munnik
- Born: 22 April 2000 (age 26)

Sport
- Sport: Athletics
- Events: Middle-distance running, Cross country running

Achievements and titles
- Personal bests: 800m: 1:47.62 (Pfungstadt, 2021); 1500m: 3:35.66 (Dubai, 2025); Mile: 4:01.00 (Utrecht, 2025); 3000m: 7:37.94 (Toruń, 2026); 5000m: 14:15.47 (Stellenbosch, 2024); Road; Mile: 3:59.00 (Parys, 2025); 10k: 29:42 (Cape Town, 2025)
Medal record
Men's athletics
Representing South Africa
African Championships
Gold medal – first place	2026 Accra	1500 m

Johannes Lodewicus Munnik (born 22 April 2000) is a South African middle-distance and cross country runner. He won the 1500 metres at the 2025 South African Athletics Championships, and competed at the 2026 World Athletics Cross Country Championships. He placed seventh over 3000 metres at the 2026 World Athletics Indoor Championships.

== Biography ==
From Potchefstroom, he is a member of Potch Track Club. He studied at North-West University.

In April 2024, he ran 3:42.38 to place third overall at the South African Athletics Championships in Pietermaritzburg in the 1500 metres. In June 2024, he placed fifth in the 1500 metres final at the 2024 African Athletics Championships in Douala, Cameroon. In October 2024, he had wins on the road at the Thembisa Mile in 4:03, and 29:32 to defend his 10k title at the Letsgo Potch Marathon.

In April 2025, he won the South African national title over 1500 metres at the South African Championships in Potchefstroom, running 3:40.38. In July, he was a finalist over 1500 metres at the 2025 Summer World University Games in Bochum, Germany. He won the 2 km race at the ASA cross country trials in October 2025. In January 2026, he competed for South Africa in the mixed relay at the 2026 World Athletics Cross Country Championships in Tallahassee, United States.

Competing Indoors in 2026, he ran a 3000 metres indoor personal best of 7:38.35 in Lievin, France. In March 2026, he placed seventh in the 3000 metres at the 2026 World Athletics Indoor Championships in Toruń, Poland, running a personal best 7:37.94 and finishing only just over a second outside the South African record of Tshepo Tshite. In May, he won the gold medal in the 1500 m at the 2026 African Championships in Athletics in Accra, Ghana, ahead of Tshite and defending champion Brian Komen of Kenya.

In June 2026, Munnik was issued with a provisional suspension from competition by the Athletics Integrity Unit after testing positive for EPO.
