= Silas Chemutai =

Ugandan middle-distance runner

Personal information
- Born: 12 June 2004 (age 22)

Sport
- Sport: Athletics
- Events: Middle-distance running, Cross country running

Achievements and titles
- Personal bests: 1500m: 3:39.34 (Kampala, 2026)

Silas Chemutai (born 12 June 2004) is an Ugandan middle-distance and cross country runner. He was Ugandan national champion over 1500 metres in 2025 and represented Uganda at the 2026 World Athletics Cross Country Championships.

== Biography ==
Chemutai won the 1500 metres title at the 2025 Ugandan Athletics Championships in Kampala, in July 2025, running a person best time of 3:39.67.

Chemutai competed in the mixed relay at the 2026 World Athletics Cross Country Championships in Tallahassee, Florida, and led Uganda into the lead after the first leg, before the Uganda team ultimately placed eighth overall. He ran a new personal best of 3:39.34 for the 1500 metres in Kampala in March 2026.

Chemutai defeated veteran Ronald Musagala over 1500 metres, running 3:42.90 at the Ugandan National Trials in April 2026 in Kampala. He defeated Musagala again at the Akii-Bua Memorial Track and Field Championships in June 2026, running 3:49.10. Chemutai competed in the mile at the 2026 Commonwealth Games in Glasgow, Scotland.
