= Bastien Augusto =

French runner (born 1999)

Personal information
- Nationality: France
- Born: 10 August 1999 (26 years, 357 days old)
- Height: 177 cm (5 ft 10 in)
- Weight: 58 kg (128 lb)

Sport
- Sport: Sport of athletics
- Events: 1500 metres 3000 metres
- Club: Bourges EA - S/l Us Berry Athletisme

Achievements and titles
- National finals: 2019 French XC; • 10.2km XC, 13th; 2019 French Champs; • 10,000m, 21st; 2019 French U23s; • 1500m, 8th; 2019 French 10K Champs; • 10km, road, 3rd (bronze); 2020 French Champs; • 5000m, 9th; 2021 French Champs; • 1500m, 4th; 2021 French 10K Champs; • 10km, road, 6th; 2021 French XC; • 9.82km XC, 5th; 2022 French Indoors; • 3000m, 1st (gold); 2022 French XC; • 10.29km XC, 2nd (silver); 2022 French 10K Champs; • 10km, road, 2nd (silver); 2023 French Indoors; • 3000m, 1st (gold); 2023 French XC; • 4.51km XC, 3rd (bronze); 2023 French Champs; • 1500m, 7th
- Personal bests: 1500m: 3:34.85 (2023) 3000m: 7:42.10 sh (2023) 10K run: 27:40 (2023)
Medal record
Men's athletics
Representing France
European Cross Country Championships
Bronze medal – third place	2021 Dublin	U23 team
Gold medal – first place	2022 Turin	Senior team
Silver medal – second place	2023 Brussels	Senior team
- Updated on 4 April 2024

Bastien Augusto (born 10 August 1999) is a French middle-distance runner. He helped his team to three medals at the European Cross Country Championships, including leading his team to a gold medal in the 2022 edition. Beginning his career in the 10K run, he has exhibited range from that distance (27:40) to the 1500 m (3:34.85).

== Career ==
Augusto began his career on the roads, running 30:07 in the Corrida Pédestre Internationale de Houilles 10K run in 2018. He won his first national medal at the 2019 French 10K champs, placing 3rd.

By virtue of his 4th-place finish in the 1500 m at the 2021 French Athletics Championships, Augusto qualified for his first national team at the 2021 European Athletics U23 Championships. At the championships, he qualified for the finals and finished 16th. Later that year he also represented France at the 2021 European Cross Country Championships by finishing 5th at that year's French Cross Country Championships. Running in the U23 race, he helped his team win a bronze medal.

In 2022, Augusto improved his showings at both the French and 2022 European Cross Country Championships, this time placing 6th individually in the senior race to lead the other French scorers Yann Schrub and Morhad Amdouni to a gold medal. Bastien was not expected to lead the French team, as Jimmy Gressier said in Ouest-France (in French), "Everyone was talking about Yann (Schrub) or Morhad (Amdouni) for the victory or at least the place of best Frenchman, I knew that we had to watch Bastien. Since his beginnings in athletics, he's been a friend, I know what he does in training, I know what he's worth and his return to Lille at the beginning of October over 10 km in 28'15 doesn't even reflect not quite his level".

At his third European Cross Country showing in 2023, Augusto only finished 52nd but nonetheless his French team won a senior silver medal.

== Personal life ==
Born in Limoges to his father Paul Philippe, Augusto trains in Bourges where he is a member of the Bourges EA club US Berry Athlétisme. In March 2024, Augusto moved to the United States to train for the 2024 Olympic Games.

== Statistics ==
=== Personal best progression ===
1500m progression
#	Mark	Pl.	Competition	Venue	Date	Ref.
1	3:46.22	11th	Meeting d'Amiens Métropole	Amiens, France	8 Jun 2019	
2	3:42.61	4th	Meeting Fungana	Pontoise, France	18 Sep 2020	
3	3:47.78	(gold) (Round B)	French Athletics Championships	Miramas, France	20 Feb 2021	
4	3:41.10	8th	IFAM Meeting, Flanders Cup	Oordegem, Belgium	28 May 2021	
5	3:38.33	6th	Meeting National de Carquefou	Carquefou, France	10 Jun 2021	
6	3:35.99	6th	Meeting WACT Silver de Montreuil	Montreuil, Seine-Saint-Denis, France	30 May 2023	
7	3:34.85	2nd place, silver medalist(s)	Meeting Pro Athlé Tour de Marseille	Marseille, France	16 Jul 2023	
