= Cornelius Tuwei =

Kenyan runner

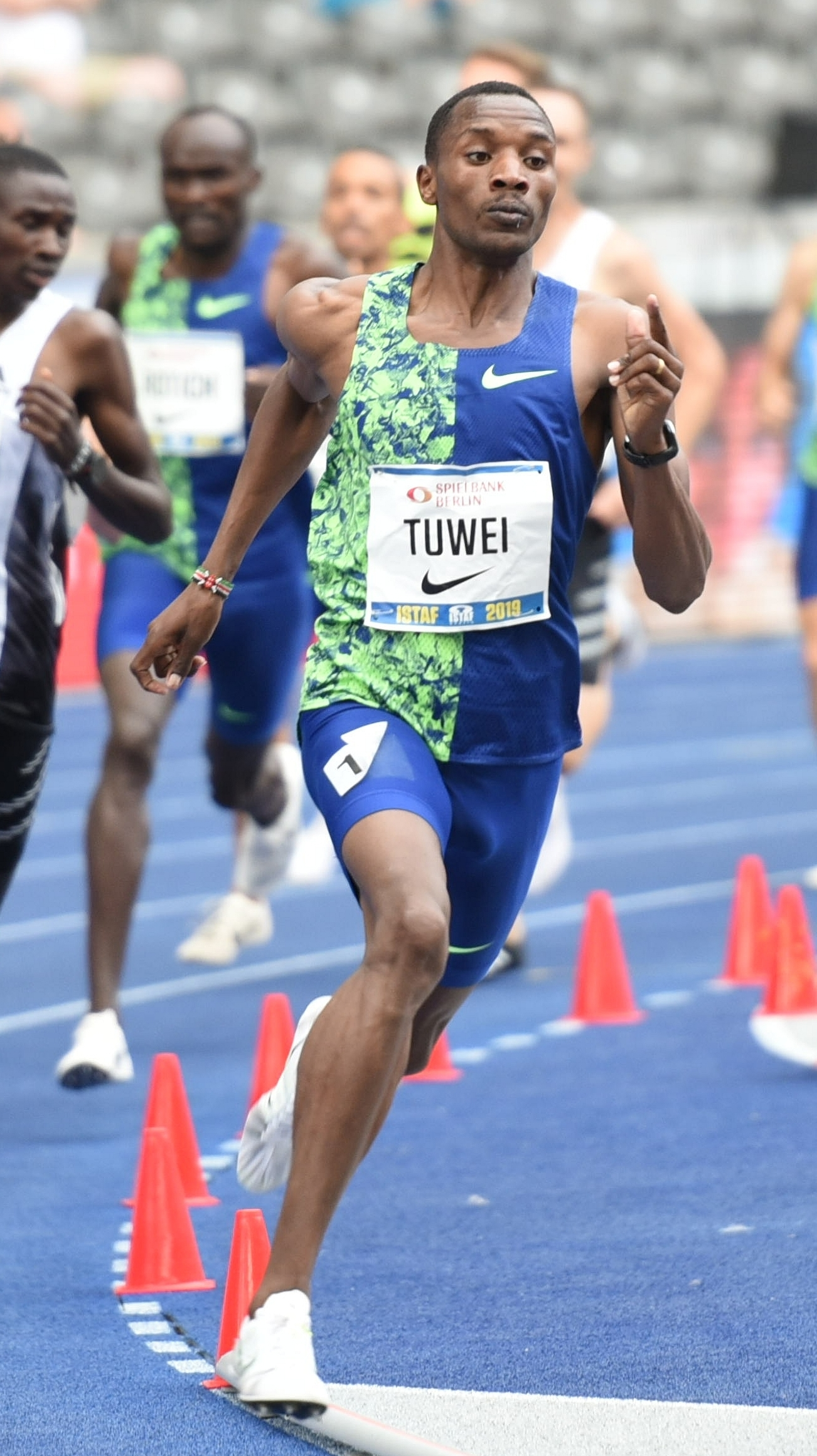
- Tuwei at the 2019 ISTAF Berlin

Personal information
- Full name: Cornelius Kipkoech Tuwei
- Born: 24 May 1993 (age 33) Nandi County, Kenya
- Height: 5 ft 9 in (175 cm)
- Weight: 68 kg (150 lb)

Sport
- Sport: Athletics
- Events: 800 metres, 1500 metres

Achievements and titles
- Highest world ranking: 6 (800m)
- Personal best: 1:43;76 800m 2:16:89 1000m 3:35;24 1500m
Medal record
Athletics
Representing Kenya}
Military World Games
Silver medal – second place	2019 Wuhan	800 metres
African Games
Silver medal – second place	2019 Rabat	800 metres

Cornelius Kipkoech Tuwei (born 24 May 1993) is a Kenyan middle-distance runner specialising in the 800 metres.

== Athletic career ==
Cornelius Tuwei gained his first experience at international championships in 2018 at the Commonwealth Games in Gold Coast, Australia, where he was eliminated in the first round of the 800-meter event with a time of 1:47.10 min. The following year, he took part in the African Games in Rabat for the first time, winning the silver medal there in 1:45.41 min behind the Tunisian Abdessalem Ayouni. He then also won the silver medal at the Military World Games in Wuhan in 1:49.20 min, this time finishing behind Michał Rozmys of Poland.

== Personal bests ==
Outdoor

- 400 metres – 46.94 (Nairobi 2016)
- 600 metres – 1:15.40 (Liège 2023)
- 800 metres – 1:43.76 (Heusden-Zolder 2021)
- 1000 metres – 2:16.89 (Székesfehérvár 2018)
- 1500 metres – 3:35.34 (Berlin 2019)

Indoor

- 800 metres – 1:46.47 (Toruń 2021)
- 1500 metres – 3:38.91 (Luxembourg 2021)
