= Nuno Pereira (athlete) =

Portuguese athlete (born 2000)

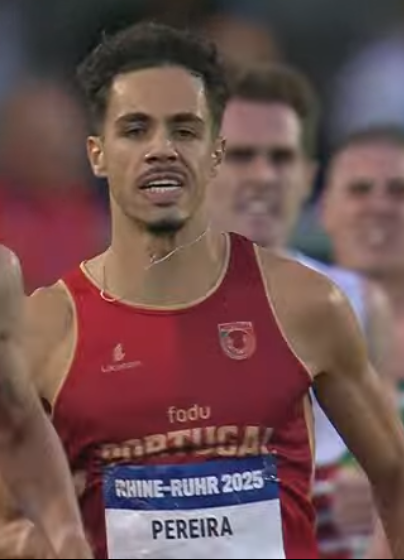
- At the 2025 Summer World University Games

Personal information
- Full name: Nuno Manuel Silva Pereira
- Nationality: Portuguese
- Born: 27 November 2000 (age 25) Funchal, Madeira, Portugal

Sport
- Country: Portugal
- Sport: Athletics
- Events: 800 metres, 1500 metres, 3000 metres
- Club: Sporting CP
- Coached by: Diogo Sousa

Achievements and titles
- Personal bests: 800 metres: 1.46.49; 1500 metres: 3.32,16; 3000 metres: 7.50,86 i
Medal record
Men's athletics
Representing Portugal
European Athletics U20 Championships
Gold medal – first place	2019 Borås	1500 metres

Nuno Pereira (born 27 November 2000) is a Portuguese athlete specialized in the 800, 1500 and 3000 metres events.

Starting in Triathlon in his youth, he switched to athletics at the age of 16, becoming U18 national vice-champion that same year. In 2019, he became European U20 champion in the 1500 metres, becoming the second madeiran-born athlete to win a global medal in Athletics (the first one being Alberto Paulo) and the first one to win a European title (in Athletics).

He is fourth in Portugal's 1500 meters and 3000 metres indoor all time lists.

== Career ==
=== 2017 ===
In his first year solely focused in Athletics, he finished second in 800 and 1500 metres in Portugal's U18 National Championships, after winning a silver medal in the 800 metres indoor at the Portugal's U18 indoor National Championships. That same year, he represented Portugal in a Spain-Portugal meeting, achieving the second position in the 1500 meters.

=== 2019 ===
In 2019, he left G.D. Estreito to join Sporting CP, one of the two best teams in the country. He became Portugal's U20 national champion in the 800 and 1500 metres, before he won the national title in the 1500 metres. Later that year, at the European U20 Athletics Championships, he achieved the first position in the 1500 metres, after a final kick that left everyone behind. It was Portugal's only gold medal at those championships.

=== 2021 ===
In the winter, he achieved the qualifying standard to the 2021 European Athletics Indoor Championships in the 1500 metres. He finished 28th, becoming the first madeiran-born athlete to compete at a European indoor championship. Later in that year, he finished 10th in the 1500 metres final at the 2021 European U23 Athletics Championships.

=== 2023 ===
Nuno qualified for the Universiade, finishing fifth in the 1500 metres final.

=== 2025 ===
During the winter season, he participated at the 2025 European Athletics Indoor Championships, where he finished fourth in his semi-final, 0,04s away from qualifying to the final. In the summer, he improved his times a lot, lowering to a 3.32,16 in the 1500 metres and 1.46,49 in the 800 metres, qualifying for the 2025 World Athletics Championships for the first time. There, he finished seventh in his heat, one place below the direct qualifying.

== International competitions ==
Representing Portugal
Year	Competition	Venue	Position	Event	Time
2017	Troféu Ibérico Espanha - Portugal	Ávila, Spain	2nd	1500 m	4:07.18
2018	European Cross Country Junior Championships	Tilburg, Netherlands	67th	Junior race	19:39
2019	European U20 Championships	Borås, Sweden	1st	1500 m	3:55.88
2021	European Indoor Championships	Toruń, Poland	28th (h)	1500 m	3:42.38
2021	European U23 Championships	Tallinn, Estonia	10th	1500 m	3:42.11
2022	2022 European Cross Country Championships	Piemonte, Italy	10th	Mixed Relay	17:56
2022	Ibero-American Championships	La Nucia, Spain	13th (sf)	800 m	1:50.36
2023	World University Games	Chengdu, China	5th	1500 m	3:41.56
2025	European Indoor Championships	Apeldoorn, Netherlands	4th (h)	1500 m	3:38.25
2025	World University Games	Bochum, Germany	6th	1500 m	3:47.12
2025	World Championships	Tokyo, Japan	45th (h)	1500 m	3:42.63
2026	European Championships	Birmingham, United Kingdom	25th (h)	1500 m	3:43.74
