= Thomas Keen (runner) =

British athlete

Personal information
- Nationality: British
- Born: 16 June 2001 (age 25)

Sport
- Sport: Athletics
- Event: Middle-distance

Achievements and titles
- Personal bests: 800m: 1:46.18 (Manchester, 2022); 1500m: 3:32.94 (London, 2026); Mile: 3:49.33 (London, 2026); 3000m: 7:45.87 (Glasgow, 2025)
Medal record
Men's athletics
Representing Great Britain
World Cross Country Championships
Bronze medal – third place	2024 Belgrade	Mixed relay
European Athletics U18 Championships
Gold medal – first place	2018 Győr	3000 m

Thomas Keen (born 16 June 2001) is a British middle-distance and cross country runner. He won the 3000 metres at the 2026 British Indoor Athletics Championships. He was a gold medalist over 3000 metres at the 2018 European U18 Championships and a bronze medalist in the mixed relay at the 2024 World Cross Country Championships.

== Early life ==
Keen is from Cambridgeshire, and studied at Birmingham University.

== Career ==
A successful junior racer, he won the gold medal at the 2018 European Athletics U18 Championships over 3000 metres in Győr. In 2020, he broke the British junior 1,500m record whilst racing for England at the Indoor Classic in Vienna, running 3:41.44.

After moving into the senior ranks, he ran a 1500m PB of 3:36.34 in Australia in February 2024. In March 2024, he was a bronze medalist in the mixed relay at the 2024 World Cross Country Championships in Belgrade.

In December 2024, he finished runner-up in a photo finish to Tomer Tarragano in the Battersea New Year's Eve 5k in London. He finished runner-up over 1500 metres at the 2025 British Indoor Athletics Championships. He was selected for the British team for the 2025 European Athletics Indoor Championships in Apeldoorn.

He finished fourth over 1500 metres at the 2025 UK Athletics Championships in Birmingham.

In January 2026, Keen won the 3000 metres at the GAA Miler Meet in Glasgow, running 7:46:07. On 15 February, Keen ran 7:51.68 to win the 3000 metres title at the 2026 British Indoor Athletics Championships in Birmingham, finishing narrowly ahead of Henry McLuckie (7:51.70).

In June, he placed third in the final of the 1500 metres at the 2026 British Championships behind Arlo Ludewick and Jake Heyward. Competing in the 2026 Diamond League at the 2026 London Athletics Meet on 18 July, he ran a personal best for the mile of 3:49.33, in the same race as Josh Kerr set a new world record. He was a finalist in the mile at the 2026 Commonwealth Games in Glasgow, Scotland.
