= Abel Kipsang =

Kenyan middle-distance runner

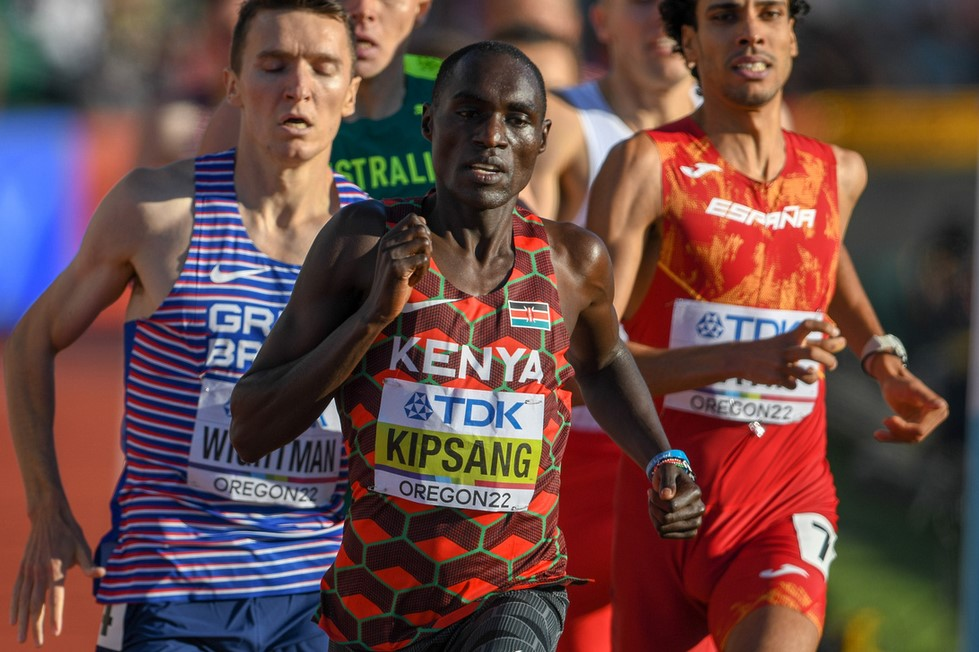
- Kipsang in 2022

Personal information
- Full name: Abel Kipsang Belet
- Nationality: Kenyan
- Born: 22 November 1996 (age 29)

Sport
- Country: Kenya
- Sport: Athletics
- Events: 800 m, 1500 m
- Club: Police/Golazo
- Coached by: Alex Sang

Achievements and titles
- Personal bests: 800 m: 1:45.14 (Tomblaine 2021); 1500 m: 3:29.11 (Chorzów 2023); Mile: 3:50.87 (Eugene 2022); Indoors; 1500 m: 3:33.36 (Belgrad 2022)
Medal record
Men's athletics
Representing Kenya
World Indoor Championships
Bronze medal – third place	2022 Belgrade	1500 m
African Games
Bronze medal – third place	2023 Accra	1500 m
African Championships
Gold medal – first place	2022 Saint Pierre	1500 m

Abel Kipsang Bele (born 22 November 1996) is a Kenyan middle-distance runner who specializes in the 1500 metres. He placed fourth in the event at the 2020 Tokyo Olympics. Kipsang won the bronze medal at the 2022 World Indoor Championships in Belgrade.

== Career ==
Abel Kipsang gained his first experience at international championships at the 2019 African Games in Rabat, where he finished fourth over the 800 metres in a time of 1:45.43 minutes. Coached by Alex sang former 800m (1.45:13)

He set a personal best in the 1500 metres of 3:32.6 in Marseille on 9 June 2021, before finishing third on 19 June at the Kenyan Olympic trials to secure his place at the delayed 2020 Tokyo Olympics. His mark from Marseille placed him in the top 10 worldwide. At the Tokyo Games on 5 August, Kipsang set a new Olympic record in the semifinals of the 1500 m with a time of 3:31.65, further improving his personal best. This record was later broken by Jakob Ingebrigtsen who ran 3:28.32 in the final, where Kipsang set a new personal best of 3:29.56 for fourth. Timothy Cheruiyot clinched silver in 3:29.01 while Josh Kerr was third clocking 3:29.05.

In March 2022, he became World Indoor Championship bronze medallist in Belgrade, setting a personal best of 3:33.36 and finishing behind Samuel Tefera (3:32.77) and Ingebrigtsen (3:33.02). In June 2022, he was a gold medalist over 1500 metres at the 2022 African Championships in Mauritius.

Selected for the 1500m at the 2023 World Athletics Championships, he qualified for the final, in which he finished fourth overall.

In March 2024, he was a bronze medalist over 1500 metres at the delayed 2023 African Games in Accra.

He won the 1500 metres at the Kip Keino Classic in Nairobi on 31 May 2025. He finished third in the 1500 metres at the Kenyan Athletic Championships in June 2025. He ran 3:50.93 in the Bowerman Mile at the 2025 Prefontaine Classic on 5 July.

== Competition record ==
Representing Kenya
Year	Competition	Venue	Position	Event	Time
2019	African Games	Rabat, Morocco	4th	800 m	1:45.43
2019	African Games	Rabat, Morocco	11th (h)	4 × 100 m relay	41.28
2021	Olympic Games	Tokyo, Japan	4th	1500 m	3:29.56
2022	World Indoor Championships	Belgrade, Serbia	3rd	1500 m i	3:33.36 PB
2022	African Championships	Port Louis, Mauritius	1st	1500 m	3:36.57
2022	World Championships	Eugene, United States	7th	1500 m	3:31.21
2023	World Championships	Budapest, Hungary	4th	1500 m	3:29.89
2024	African Games	Accra, Ghana	3rd	1500 m	3:39.45
