= Ruben Verheyden =

Belgian middle-distance runner

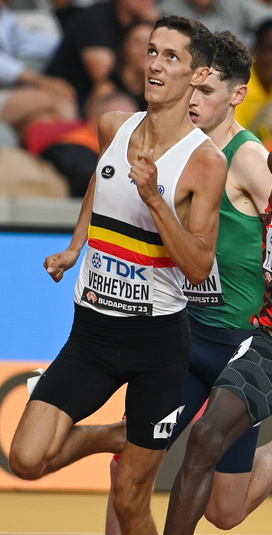
- Verheyden in 2023

Personal information
- Nationality: Belgian
- Born: 22 December 2000 (age 25)

Sport
- Country: Belgium
- Sport: Track and Field
- Events: 800m, 1500m
- Coached by: Kim Barbé

Achievements and titles
- Personal bests: Outdoor; 800 m: 1:45.69 (Brussels 2024); 1500 m: 3:30.99 (Paris 2025) NR; 5000 m: 14:32.64 (Herve 2021); Indoor; 800 m: 1:49.18 (Ghent 2022); 1500 m: 3:46.55 (Toruń 2024)
Medal record
Men's athletics
Representing Belgium
European Cross Country Championships
Silver medal – second place	2024 Antalya	Senior team
Bronze medal – third place	2021 Dublin	Mixed relay
European U23 Championships
Gold medal – first place	2021 Tallinn	1500 m

Ruben Verheyden (born 22 December 2000) is a Belgian middle-distance runner, who specializes in the 1500 metres. He won a bronze medal at the 2021 European Cross Country Championships in the Mixed relay with his teammates Vanessa Scaunet, Elise Vanderelst and Stijn Baeten. He won the 1500m at the 2022 Belgian Athletics Championships, and the same event at the 2021 and 2022 Belgian Indoor Athletics Championships. He also won the 1500 m at the 2021 European Athletics U23 Championships.

In 2024, Verheyden fell just short of the podium in fourth place at the 2024 European Athletics Championships and with a personal best time of 3:33.40 qualified for the 2024 Summer Olympics in Paris, France. At those Olympics, Verheyden, 12th in his heat and 10th in the repechages, failed to qualify for the semi-finals. In December 2024, he picked up a silver medal with the Belgium men's team at the 2024 European Cross Country Championships in Antalya, Turkey.

In June 2025, Verheyden set new 1500 metres and Mile run Belgian national records at the 2025 Meeting de Paris resp. the 2025 Bislett Games legs of the 2025 Diamond League. With his time of 3:30.99, he qualified for the 1500 metres race at the 2025 World Athletics Championships where has was eliminated in the semi-finals.

Verheyden spent most of 2026's outdoor season chasing Belgian Athletics qualification time of 3:32.13 for the 1500 metres at the 2026 European Athletics Championships in Birmingham, England. He came close in the Diamond League-meeting in Rabat, Morocco , the 2026 World Athletics Continental Tour Paavo Nurmi Games in Turku, Finland and the Diamond League-meeting in Stockholm, Sweden. Having failed to meet Belgian Athletics qualification time, he was nonetheless selected by Belgian Athletics as he had met European Athletics' criteria. At the 2026 European Athletics Championships, he was eliminated in the first round.
