= Arlo Ludewick =

British middle-distance runner

- Ludewick in 2026

Personal information
- Born: 6 May 2000 (age 26)
- Education: University of Manchester

Sport
- Sport: Athletics
- Event: Middle-distance running

Achievements and titles
- Personal bests: 800m: 1:46.49 (2026); 1500m: 3:32.92 (2026); Mile: 3:48.17 (2026)

Arlo Ludewick (born 6 May 2000) is a British middle-distance runner. He won the 1500 metres title at the 2026 UK Athletics Championships.

== Biography ==
A member of the Herne Hill Harriers, he set a club record over 800 metres in 2022. He competed for Virginia Tech in the United States in 2023. Ludewick also attended the University of Manchester.

In May 2026, he won the British Milers Grand Prix A race over 1500 metres in May 2026 in Trafford, Manchester in 3:37.48. The following month, he ran over 800 metres at the BMC Gold Standard Races at the same venue in 1:46.49. Later that month, he won the British Milers Grand Prix A race over 800 metres in Loughborough, in a time of 1:46.50. On 21 June, Ludewick won the 1500 metres title at the 2026 UK Athletics Championships in 3:38.85 ahead of Jake Heyward and Tom Keen. On 11 July, he ran a personal best 3:33.07 for the 1500 metres in Kortrijk, Belgium, which met the automatic qualifying standard for the 2026 European Championships. Competing in the 2026 Diamond League at the 2026 London Athletics Meet on 18 July, he ran a personal best for the mile of 3:48.17, in the same race as Josh Kerr set a new world record. He was named in the British team for the 2026 European Athletics Championships in Birmingham for his senior international debut, and placed fifth in the final of the 1500 metres on 15 August, running 3:36.65 with 26.7 seconds for the final 200 metres. In October 2026, he was moved up to the confirmation level in the 2026-27 Olympic World Class Programme awarded by UK Athletics.
