= Romain Mornet =

French athlete (born 1997)

Personal information
- Born: 8 November 1997 (age 28) La Roche-sur-Yon, France
- Height: 181 cm (5 ft 11 in)
- Weight: 69 kg (152 lb)

Sport
- Country: France
- Sport: Athletics
- Event: Middle distance running

Achievements and titles
- Personal bests: Outdoor; 800 m: 1:48.94 (Limoges, 2024); 1500 m: 3:31.62 (Paris, 2025); 3000 m: 7:36.44 (Leuven, 2024); Indoor; 1500 m: 3:37.03 (Karlsruhe, 2025); Mile: 3:54.68 (Liévin, 2025); 3000 m: 7:40.39 (Luxembourg, 2025)
Medal record
Men's athletics
Representing France
European Cross Country Championships
Bronze medal – third place	2022 Turin	Mixed relay

Romain Mornet (born 8 November 1997) is a French middle-distance and cross country runner. He won the 1500 metres at the French Athletics Championships in 2024 and 2026.

== Biography ==
Mornet was a bronze medalist in the mixed relay at the 2022 European Cross Country Championships in Turin alongside Charlotte Mouchet, Azeddine Habz and Anaïs Bourgoin.

In 2023, at the Montesson meeting he ran a 3:34.29 personal best over 1500 metres and was selected to represent France at the 2023 European Athletics Team Championships in Silesia.

He won the French national indoor title at the French Indoor Athletics Championships in Miramas in February 2024. He ran for France at the 2024 World Athletics Cross Country Championships in the mixed relay in Belgrade in March 2024, and alongside Nicolas-Marie Daru, Flavie Renouard and Mouchet placed sixth overall.

In June 2024, he became French Athletics Championships title winner over 1500 metres. He was also a finalist in that distance at the 2024 European Athletics Championships in Rome, placing eleventh overall.

Mornet qualified for the final of the 3000 metres at the 2025 European Athletics Indoor Championships in Apeldoorn. He ran a personal best of 3:31.62 for the 1500 metres at the 2025 Meeting de Paris. In September 2025, he was a semi-finalist over 1500 metres at the 2025 World Championships in Tokyo, Japan.

Mornet was selected for the 2026 World Athletics Indoor Championships in Poland in March 2026, running the 1500 metres in 3:41.68 without advancing to the final. In May, he was runner-up to Darragh McElhinney in the 1500 metres at the Trond Mohn Games in Bergen, running 3:38.27. On 26 July, he won the 1500 metres at the French Athletics Championships in Albi. In August, he competed at the 2026 European Athletics Championships in Birmingham, England, placing eighth in the final of the 1500 metres.

== Personal life ==
Based in Laval, Mayenne, he works as a supply teacher in P.E. when not racing.
