= Tshepo Tshite =

South African middle-distance runner

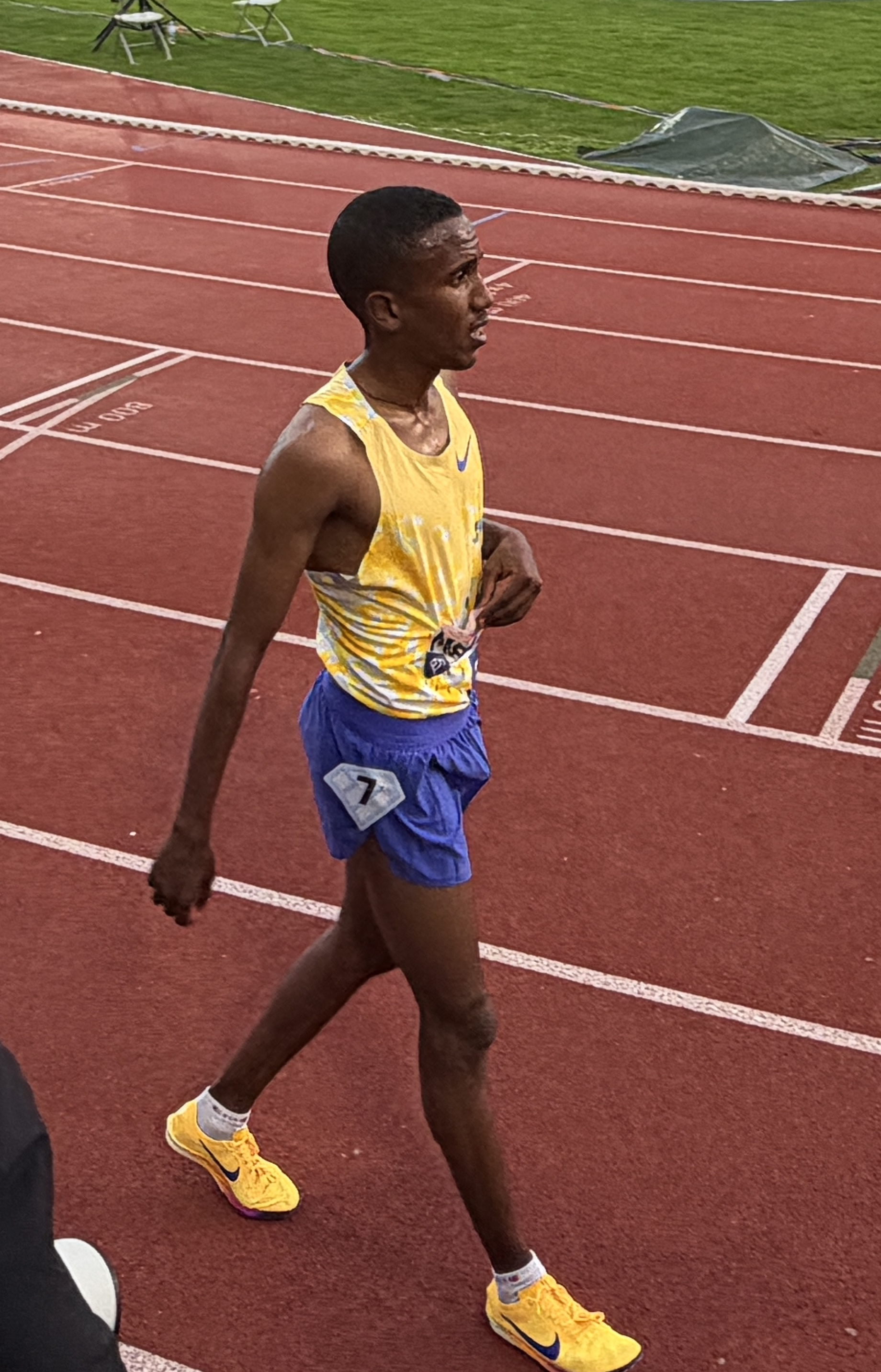
- Tshepo Tshite in 2026

Personal information
- Born: 15 January 1997 (age 29)

Sport
- Country: South Africa
- Sport: Athletics
- Events: 800 metres, 1500 metres, 3000 metres, 5000 metres

Achievements and titles
- Personal bests: 400m: 47:75 (Paris 2022); 1 500m: 3:31:35 NR(Paris 2025); 3 000m: 8:58:38 (Pretoria 2020); 5 000m: 13:35:54 (Pietermaritzeburg 2024)
Medal record
Men's Athletics
Representing South Africa
African Championships
| Silver medal – second place | 2026 Accra | 1500 m |

Tshepo Tshite (born 15 January 1997) is a South African middle-distance runner specialising in the 800 metres. He represented his country at the 2019 World Championships reaching the semifinals.

== Statistics ==
=== Circuit performances ===
Grand Slam Track results
| Slam | Race group | Event | Pl. | Time | Prize money |
|---|---|---|---|---|---|
| 2025 Miami Slam | Short distance | 1500 m | 8th | 3:36.28 | US$10,000 |
| 2025 Miami Slam | Short distance | 800 m | 7th | 1:45.36 | US$10,000 |

=== International competitions ===
| Year | Competition | Venue | Position | Event | Notes |
Representing South Africa
| 2018 | African Championships | Asaba, Nigeria | 9th (h) | 800 m | 1:48.17 |
| 2019 | African Games | Rabat, Morocco | 12th (sf) | 800 m | 1:49.17 |
| 2019 | World Championships | Doha, Qatar | 15th (sf) | 800 m | 1:46.08 |
| 2022 | African Championships | Port Louis, Mauritius | 18th (h) | 800 m | 1:51.07 |
| 2022 | World Championships | Eugene, United States | 31st (h) | 800 m | 1:47.61 |
| 2023 | World Championships | Budapest, Hungary | 7th (sf) | 1500 m | 3:32.98 |
| 2024 | World Indoor Championships | Glasgow, United Kingdom | 19th (h) | 1500 m | 3:46.70 |
| 2024 | Olympic Games | Paris, France | 12th (rep) | 1500 m | 3:35.35 |
| 2025 | World Championships | Tokyo, Japan | 9th | 1500 m | 3:35.50 |
| 2026 | African Championships | Accra, Ghana | 2nd | 1500 m | 3:42.31 |
| 2026 | Commonwealth Games | Glasgow, United Kingdom | 10th | Mile | 3:57.43 |
| 2026 | World Road Running Championships | Copenhagen, Denmark | 10th | Road mile | 3:55.66 |

=== Personal bests ===
Outdoor

- 400 metres – 47.75 (Pretoria 2022)
- 800 metres – 1:44.59 (Bydgoszcz 2022)
- 1500 metres – 3:31.35 (Paris 2025) NR
- 5000 metres – 14:29.49 (Pretoria 2023)

Indoor

- 800 metres – 1:47.52 (Düsseldorf 2020)
- 1500 metres – 3:35.06 (Toruń 2024) NR
- Mile – 3:54.56 (Val-de-Reuil 2024)
