= Foster Malleck =

Canadian middle-distance runner (born 2001)

Personal information
- Nationality: Canadian
- Born: 12 August 2001 (age 25)

Sport
- Sport: Athletics
- Event: Middle-distance running
- College team: Boston University Terriers

Achievements and titles
- Personal bests: 800m: 1:47.81 (2025); 1500m: 3:32.38 (2025); Mile: 3:51.39 (2026); 3000m: 7:50.96 (2025)
Medal record
Men's athletics
Representing Canada
Pan American Championships
Gold medal – first place	2026 Medellín	1500 m
NACAC Championships
Gold medal – first place	2025 Freeport	1500 m
NACAC U23 Championships
Bronze medal – third place	2023 San José	1500m

Foster Malleck (born 12 August 2001) is a Canadian middle-distance runner. He won the gold medal in the 1500 metres at the 2025 NACAC Championships and competed for Canada at the 2025 World Athletics Indoor Championships.

== Biography ==
He is from Kitchener, Ontario. He won the gold medal over 1500 metres at the 2019 Pan American U20 Athletics Championships. He won the bronze medal at the 2023 NACAC U23 Championships in San José, Costa Rica.

Malleck competed collegiately for Boston University. Malleck won both the mile run and 3000 metres at the Patriot League Indoor Track and Field championship on 3 March 2025. He finished third in the mile at the 2025 NCAA Division I Indoor Track and Field Championships in Virginia Beach in March 2025 competing for Boston University. That month, he competed for Canada at the 2025 World Athletics Indoor Championships in Nanjing, China.

He finished as runner-up to Max Davies over 1500 metres at the 2025 Canadian Athletics Championships in Ottawa. He ran a personal best 3:32.38 for the 1500m performance at La Classique de Montréal, a time that met the auto-qualifying standard for the upcoming world championships and moved him to second on the Canadian all-time list.

He won the gold medal over 1500 metres at the 2025 NACAC Championships in Freeport, Bahamas in 3:37.55 to break the championship record previously held by Eric Holt. In September 2025, he was a semi-finalist over 1500 metres at the 2025 World Championships in Tokyo, Japan.

In January 2026, he ran as part of the Canadian mixed 4x2 km relay team which placed ninth overall at the 2026 World Athletics Cross Country Championships in Tallahassee, Florida, alongside Jean-Simon Desgagnés, Kate Current and Regan Yee. Malleck ran 3:51.39 for the mile run in Boston on 31 January 2026 to set a new Canadian indoor national record, although the record only stood for two weeks until broken by Calgary’s Aaron Ahl on the same track. The following month, Malleck set a national record in the 1500 meters indoors, running 3:33.39 at the Saucony Battle for Boston meet in Boston, Massachusetts on 22 February 2026. He was selected for the 2026 World Athletics Indoor Championships in Poland in March 2026, running the 1500 metres in 3:39.05 to place fourth in his heat, without advancing to the final.

Malleck won the gold medal in the 1500 metres at the 2026 Pan American Championships in Athletics in Medellín. He was a finalist in the mile at the 2026 Commonwealth Games in Glasgow, Scotland, placing seventh overall. Competing in the mile at the 2026 World Athletics Road Running Championships in Copenhagen, Malleck finished 13th in a road personal best of 3:56.55.
