= Titouan Le Grix =

French middle-distance runner (born 2002)

Personal information
- Born: 16 June 2002 (age 24) Nice, France
- Height: 184 cm (6 ft 0 in)
- Weight: 65 kg (143 lb)

Sport
- Country: France
- Sport: Athletics
- Events: Middle-distance running, Steeplechase
- Coached by: Pol Domenech

Achievements and titles
- Personal bests: 1500m: 3:31.46 (2026); 5000m: 13:28.23 (2025); 3000m S'chase: 8:29.02 (2025); Indoor; 1500m: 3:36.16 (2026); Mile: 3:51.90 (2026); 3000m: 7:40.55 (2026); 5000m: 13:36.32 (2024); Road; 10k: 28:20 (2025)
Medal record
Men's athletics
Representing France
Summer World University Games
Silver medal – second place	2025 Bochum	1500 m
European Cross Country Championships
Silver medal – second place	2023 Brussels	U23 team

Titouan Le Grix (born 16 June 2002) is a French middle-distance runner and steeplechaser. He won the 1500 metres title at the 2026 French Indoor Athletics Championships and was the silver medalist at the 2025 Summer World University Games in the 1500 metres.

== Biography ==
Le Grix is from Baillargues, having lived there from the age of 5 years-old. A keen footballer, he joined his the local football club at a young age and played for 13 years. In 2020, he joined Montpellier Athlétic Méditerranée Métropole, having been encouraged to try athletics by his father, who is a keen triathlete. Within a year, he was representing France in the 3000 metres steeplechase at the 2021 European Athletics U20 Championships. That year, he enrolled into Wingate University in the United States to study for a degree in Sports Management. He won a silver medal with the French U23 men's team at the 2023 European Cross Country Championships in Brussels.

In May 2024, he won the 3000 metres steeplechase at the 2024 NCAA Division II men's outdoor track and field championships in Kansas, in a Wingate clean sweep of the podium positions. In 2025 in the United States, he ran a personal best 3:34.30 in the 1500 metres and won the NCAA Division II Indoors title in the mile run in March, before later also retaining his outdoors NCAA II title in the 3000m steeplechase. He was the silver medalist in July 2025 at the World University Games in Bochum, Germany, in the men's 1500 metres, finishing behind Filip Ostrowski of Poland. Having turned pro, Le Grix continued to training with Wingate coach Pol Domenech in North Carolina.

In February 2026, he ran 3:51.90 for the mile competing indoors at the Sound Invite in the United States. He won the 1500 metres title at the 2026 French Indoor Athletics Championships, running 3:45.51 in the final. He was selected for the 2026 World Athletics Indoor Championships in Poland in March 2026. Competing at the Championships in Toruń, he advanced to the final of the 1500 m after placing second in his heat, having made a late advance from fifth place. He placed ninth overall in the final. Competing on 28 June at the 2026 Meeting de Paris, he ran a new personal best 3:31.46 for the 1500 metres. On 26 July, he placed third in the 1500 metres French Athletics Championships in Albi.
