= Carlos Sáez (runner) =

Spanish middle-distance runner

Personal information
- Full name: Carlos Sáez Sadornil
- Born: 27 January 1999 (age 27)

Sport
- Sport: Athletics
- Event: Middle-distance running
- Club: Albacete Athletics Club
- Coached by: Antonio Serrano

Achievements and titles
- Personal bests: 800m: 1:45.52 (2025); 1500m: 3:32.28 (2025); Indoor; 800m: 1:51.73 (2020); 1500m: 3:35.94 (2026); 3000m: 8:21.51 (2021); Road; Mile: 4:17.20 (2025)
Medal record
Men's athletics
Representing Spain
Ibero-American Championships
Bronze medal – third place	2024 Cuiabá	1500 m

Carlos Sáez Sadornil (born 27 January 1999) is a Spanish middle-distance runner. He placed eighth over 1500 metres at the 2026 World Athletics Indoor Championships.

== Biography ==
From Valencia, and a member of Albacete Athletics Club, Sáez was the Spanish under-18 800 metres champion but had to overcome a ischemic stroke at the age of 17 years-old after he suffered blow to the head against a buoy while participating in freediving on La Barceloneta beach. His early career was hampered by several injuries, but in 2021 he broke the 3:40 barrier in the 1500 metres for the first time and became the Spanish under-23 national champion.

Coached by Antonio Serrano, Sáez placed second at the Spanish Indoor Championships in Orense in February 2024, and won the bronze medal over 1500 metres at the 2024 Ibero-American Championships in Cuiaba, Brazil.

In June 2025, Sáez ran a 1500 m personal best of 3:25.18 in Nerja. He lowered that best again to 3:32.28 in Heusden-Zolder, Belgium in July 2025. On 2 August, he was runner-up to Adrian Ben at the Spanish Championships 1500 metres race, running 3:41.35. In September 2025, he competed at the 2025 World Championships in Tokyo, Japan, without advancing to the semi-finals, running 3:40.61. Competing on the road, Sáez was runner-up to Isaac Nader at the Berango International Mile on 11 October 2025 in 4:18. That month he also won over the mile in Valladolid, and in Cantabria at the 30th edition of the Costa de Ajo Race in 18:13, ahead of Daniel Arce and Mariano García.

Running for Hoka, Sáez ran an indoor personal best for the 1500 metres of 3:35.94 in Luxembourg in January 2026. He placed third in the 1500 metres at the 2026 Spanish Indoor Championships in Valencia, running 3:44.86. In March 2026, he qualified for the final, and placed eighth overall, in the 1500 metres at the 2026 World Athletics Indoor Championships in Toruń, Poland, running 3:42.46 in the final. In August, he competed at the 2026 European Athletics Championships in Birmingham, England, in the 1500 metres.
