= Aaron Ahl =

Canadian athlete (born 1999)

Personal information
- Born: 25 February 1999 (age 27)

Sport
- Sport: Athletics
- Events: Middle-distance running, Steeplechase
Medal record
Men's athletics
Representing Canada
NACAC Championships
Silver medal – second place	2025 Freeport	3000m s'chase

Aaron Ahl (born 25 February 1999) is a Canadian middle-distance runner and steeplechaser. He ran a Canadian national record in the indoor mile run in 2026. In 2025, he was a silver medallist at the 2025 NACAC Championships in the 3000 metres steeplechase.

== Biography ==
Ahl is from Calgary, Alberta. He competed for Simon Fraser University in Canada before signing for the University of Washington in the United States in 2022.

In January 2024, Ahl won the Harriers Pioneer 8KM Road Race. In September 2024, Ahl won the Canmore Rocky Mountain Half Marathon, winning the race in at time of 1:11.40. In June 2024, he placed third overall in the 3000 metres steeplechase at the Canadian Athletics Championships in Montreal.

In 2024, and 2025, Ahl was runner-up to Casey Comber at the B.A.A. Invitational Mile road race in Boston, Massachusetts, running 4:08 in 2024, and 4:07 in 2025. In July 2025, he was runner-up to Jean-Simon Desgagnés in the 3000 metres steeplechase at the Canadian Athletics Championships in Ottawa. The following month, he won the silver medal in the 3000m steeplechase at the 2025 NACAC Championships in Freeport, Bahamas, finishing between Americans Daniel Michalski and Kenneth Rooks.

On 13 February 2026, Ahl broke the Canadian indoor national record for the mile by six-hundredths-of-a-second, running 3:51.33 at the BU David Hemery Valentine Invitational in Boston, Massachusetts, breaking the Canadian record set two weeks prior by Foster Malleck and taking over four seconds from his own previous personal best of 3:55.60. He was selected for the 2026 World Athletics Indoor Championships in Poland in March 2026, running the 1500 metres in 3:45.11 without advancing to the final.

Ahl placed sixth in the men's 3000 m steeplechase and competed in the mile run at the 2026 Commonwealth Games in Glasgow, Scotland.
