= Mariano García (runner) =

Spanish middle-distance runner

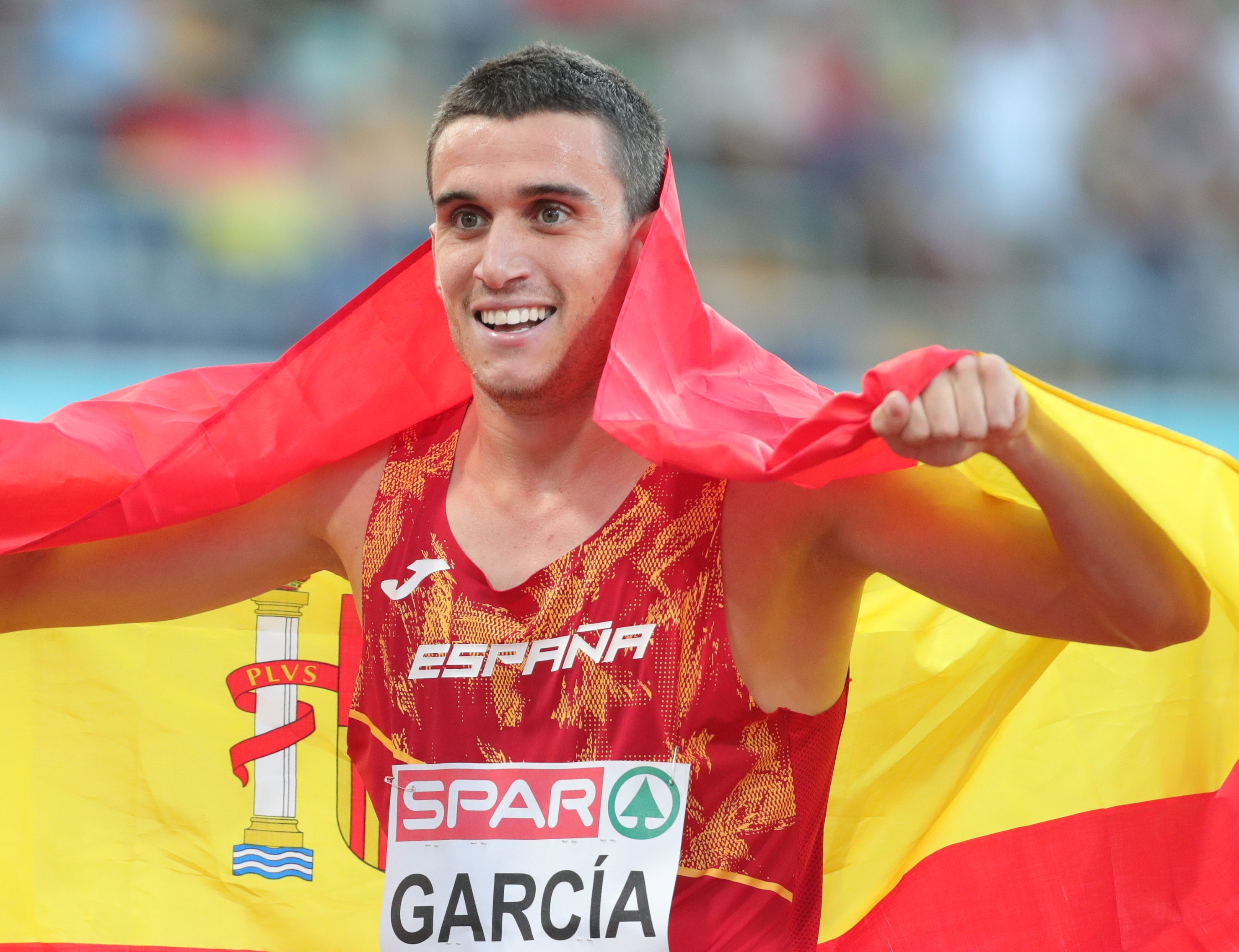
- García in 2022

Personal information
- Full name: Mariano García García
- Born: 25 September 1997 (age 28) Fuente Álamo de Murcia, Spain
- Height: 1.79 m (5 ft 10 in)
- Weight: 63 kg (139 lb)

Sport
- Sport: Athletics
- Event: 800 metres
- Club: Fuente Álamo Caja
- Coached by: Gabriel Lorente
Medal record
Men's athletics
Representing Spain
World Indoor Championships
Gold medal – first place	2022 Belgrade	800 m
Gold medal – first place	2026 Toruń	1500 m
European Championships
Gold medal – first place	2022 Munich	800 m

Mariano García García (born 25 September 1997) is a Spanish middle-distance runner specialising in the 800 metres. He represented his country at the 2019 World Championships without advancing from the first round. Earlier that year, he finished fourth at the 2019 European Indoor Championships. He won the 800 metres race at the 2022 World Athletics Indoor Championship.

== International competitions ==
Year	Competition	Venue	Position	Event	Notes
Representing Spain
2019	European Indoor Championships	Glasgow, United Kingdom	4th	800 m i	1:47.58
2019	World Championships	Doha, Qatar	38th (h)	800 m	1:49.08
2021	European Indoor Championships	Toruń, Poland	6th (sf)	800 m i	1:47.63
2022	World indoor Championships	Belgrade, Serbia	1st	800 m i	1:46.20
2022	World Championships	Eugene, United States	19th (sf)	800 m	1:46.70
2022	European Championships	Munich, Germany	1st	800 m	1:44.85
2024	World Indoor Championships	Glasgow, United Kingdom	5th	800 m i	1:48.77
2025	European Indoor Championships	Apeldoorn, Netherlands	9th (sf)	800 m i	1:46.33
2025	World Indoor Championships	Nanjing, China	8th	1500 m i	3:41.83
2025	World Championships	Tokyo, Japan	49th (h)	800 m	1:47.09
2026	World Indoor Championships	Toruń, Poland	1st	1500 m i	3:39.63
2026	European Championships	Birmingham, United Kingdom	27th (h)	1500 m	3:44.99

== Personal bests ==
Outdoor

- 800 metres – 1:43.62 (Madrid 2025)
- 1500 metres – 3:43.93 (Montreuil 2019)
- 3000 metres steeplechase – 8:57.63 (Torrent 2017)

Indoor

- 800 metres – 1:45.12 (New York 2022)
- 1500 metres – 3:42.53 (Gallur 2019)
