= Filip Ostrowski =

Polish athlete (born 2001)

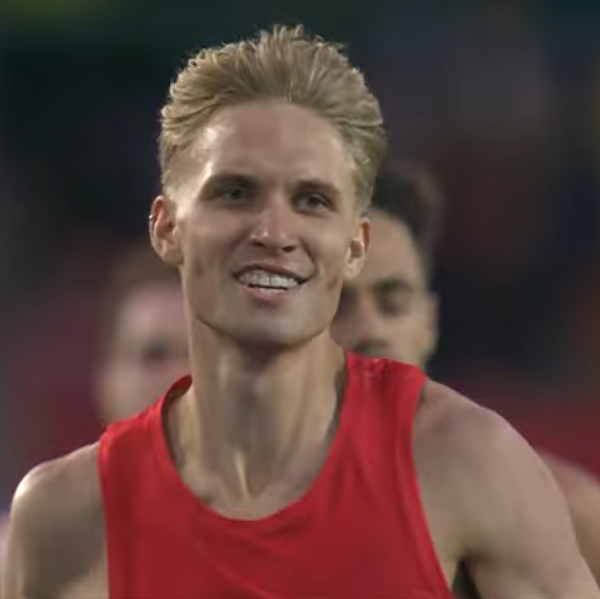
- At the 2025 Summer World University Games

Personal information
- Nationality: Polish
- Born: 12 July 2001 (age 25)

Sport
- Sport: Athletics
- Events: 800m, 1500m

Achievements and titles
- Personal bests: 800m: 1:44.08 (Paris, 2026); 1500m: 3:35.73 (Marseille, 2024); Indoor; 800m: 1:44.68 (Boston, 2026); 1500m: 3:39.82 (Erfurt, 2023)
Medal record
Men's athletics
Representing Poland
Summer World University Games
Gold medal – first place	2025 Bochum	1500 metres

Filip Ostrowski (born 12 July 2001) is a Polish track and field athlete. In 2023, he became Polish national champion in the 1500 metres.

== Biography ==
In 2020, he moved Łódź to join the training group of coach Stanisław Jaszczak. That year he lowered his 800 meters personal best to 1:46.89. In August 2022, he won Polish U23 titles in both 800 metres and 1500 metres.

In May 2023, he lowered his 800m personal best to 1:45.62, out sprinting Robert Farken in Karlsruhe. In July 2023, he qualified for the final of the 1500m at the 2023 European Athletics U23 Championships in Espoo, Finland. Later that month he became Polish champion for the first time, winning the 1500m title at the Polish Championships.

At the 2023 World Athletics Championships in Budapest, he qualified for the semi-finals of the 800m.

He set a new personal best for the 800 metres when he ran 1:44.74 at the Golden Spike Ostrava on 24 June 2025. In July 2025, he won the gold medal in the 1500m at the 2025 University Games in Germany. He competed at the 2025 World Athletics Championships in Tokyo, Japan, in September 2025 in the men's 800 metres, running 1:45.47 without advancing to the semi-finals.

On 24 January 2026, Ostrowski ran a personal best 1:44.68 for the 800 metres in Boston at the New Balance Indoor Grand Prix, finishing runner-up as Josh Hoey broke the indoor world record. The following month, he acted as pacer for Spaniard athlete Mohamed Attaoui as he broke the indoor world record over 1000 metres at the Madrid World Indoor Tour Gold. He was selected for the 800 metres at the 2026 World Athletics Indoor Championships in March 2026 in Poland, where he reached the semi-finals. In August, he competed at the 2026 European Athletics Championships in Birmingham, England, in the 800 metres, reaching the semi-finals and equalling his personal best of 1:44.08.
