= Éric Nzikwinkunda =

Burundian middle-distance runner

Personal information
- Nationality: Burundian
- Born: 1 January 1997 (age 29)

Sport
- Sport: Track and Field
- Event: 800m

Achievements and titles
- Personal bests: 400 m: 47.28 (Castellón 2019); 800 m: 1:45.16 (Leverkusen 2021); 1500 m: 3:41.51 (Castellón 2018)

Éric Nzikwinkunda (born 1 January 1997) is a Burundian middle-distance runner who competed at the 2020 Summer Olympics.

== Career ==
After reaching the semi-finals of the 2019 African Games in Rabat, Nzikwinkunda was selected to compete in the 800 metres at the 2020 Summer Olympics, in which he finished sixth in his qualifying heat in a time of 1.47:97. Nzikwinkunda took part in the 2022 World Athletics Indoor Championships in Belgrade, Serbia finishing fifth in his 1500m heat.

== Personal life ==
He is based in Penyeta Roja in the province of Castellón in Spain along with his Burundi compatriots Thierry Ndikumwenayo and Rodrigue Kwizera.
