= Jake Heyward =

Welsh middle-distance runner

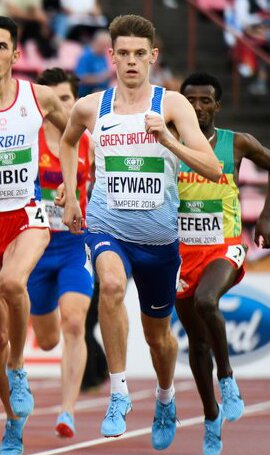
- Heyward in 2018

Personal information
- Full name: Jake David T. Heyward
- Nationality: British (Welsh)
- Born: 26 April 1999 (age 27) Lisvane, Cardiff, Wales

Sport
- Sport: Track and field
- Event: 1500 m
- Club: Oregon Track Club; Cardiff AAC
- Turned pro: 2019

Achievements and titles
- Personal bests: 800 m: 1:46.47 (Stockholm 2021); 1000 m: 2:18.55 (Finn Rock, OR 2020); 1500 m: 3:31.08 (Birmingham 2022); Mile: 3:46.73 (London, 2026); 3000 m: 8:00.93i (Cardiff 2018)
Medal record
Men's Athletics
Representing Great Britain
European Championships
Silver medal – second place	2022 Munich	1500m
European U20 Championships
Gold medal – first place	2017 Grosseto	1500 m
European U18 Championships
Gold medal – first place	2016 Tbilisi	1500 m

Jake David T. Heyward (born 26 April 1999) is a Welsh middle-distance runner. He was a silver medalist at the 2022 European Athletics Championships in the 1500 metres, competed at the 2020 Summer Olympics and represented Wales at the 2022 Commonwealth Games.

== Biography ==
Heyward was a European champion at under-18 and under-20 level while he was a member of the Cardiff Amateur Athletic Club. Having graduated from Cardiff University, he turned professional in 2020 with the Oregon Track Club.

Heyward went into the British Athletics Championship and Olympic trials in Manchester in 2021 with a 3:33.99 personal best for the 1,500 metres race, which was below the minimum Olympic standard, although he had broken Neil Horsfield's 31 year old Welsh record set in Brussels in 1990. On 26 June 2021 Heyward finished third in the 1,500m at the 2021 British Athletics Championships, to secure a place on the British team for the delayed 2020 Summer Games in Tokyo, Japan. In Tokyo, despite being hampered by an Achilles injury Heyward came through the heats and semi-finals and placed ninth in the final of the 1500m. He finished his 2021 season with a 3:52.15 mile run personal best, and Welsh record, in the 2021 Diamond League event, the Prefontaine Classic on August 21.

In June 2022, he finished fourth in the 1500 metres at the 2022 British Athletics Championships. He came fifth representing Wales in the 1500m race at the 2022 Commonwealth Games in Birmingham, running a new personal best time of 3:31.08. He won the silver medal in the 1500 metres at the 2022 European Athletics Championships in Munich, Germany, finishing behind Norwegian Jakob Ingebrigtsen. Heyward finished as runner-up in the Fifth Avenue Mile behind three-time winner Jake Wightman in September 2022.

Heyward had time away from competitive running due to two surgeries on his achilles. Almost four years after his last competitive race, Heyward returned to the track at the Payton Jordan Invitational in Palo Alto on 1 May 2026, winning over 1500 metres in a time of 3:37.75. The following week, he ran 3:34.18 in finishing runner-up to Marco Langon at the Franson Last Chance in Azusa, California. On 7 June, he ran 3:35.53 at the Diamond League event in Stockholm. That month, he placed second in the final of the 1500 metres at the 2026 British Championships behind Arlo Ludewick. Competing at the 2026 London Athletics Meet on 18 July, Heyward ran a personal best for the mile of 3:46.73 in the same race as Josh Kerr set a new world record.

Heyward was selected as part of the Welsh team for the 2026 Commonwealth Games, qualifying for the final of the mile run and placing fourth overall. Having been at the front of the race on the final bend, he placed fourth in the final of the 1500 metres at the 2026 European Athletics Championships in Birmingham, on 15 August. On 23 August, he ran 3:31.46 to place sixth over 1500 m in the Diamond League at the 2026 Kamila Skolimowska Memorial in Silesia, Poland. At the 2026 Diamond League Final in Brussels in September, he placed eighth over 1500 metres. Heyward finished as runner-up in the Fifth Avenue Mile in New York in 3:46, a second behind Marco Langon on 13 September. Competing at the 2026 World Athletics Road Running Championships in Copenhagen the following weekend, he finished eleventh in 3:55.76 in the mile race.
