= 2023 European Athletics Indoor Championships – Men's 1500 metres =

Men's 1500 metres at the 2023 European Athletics Indoor Championships
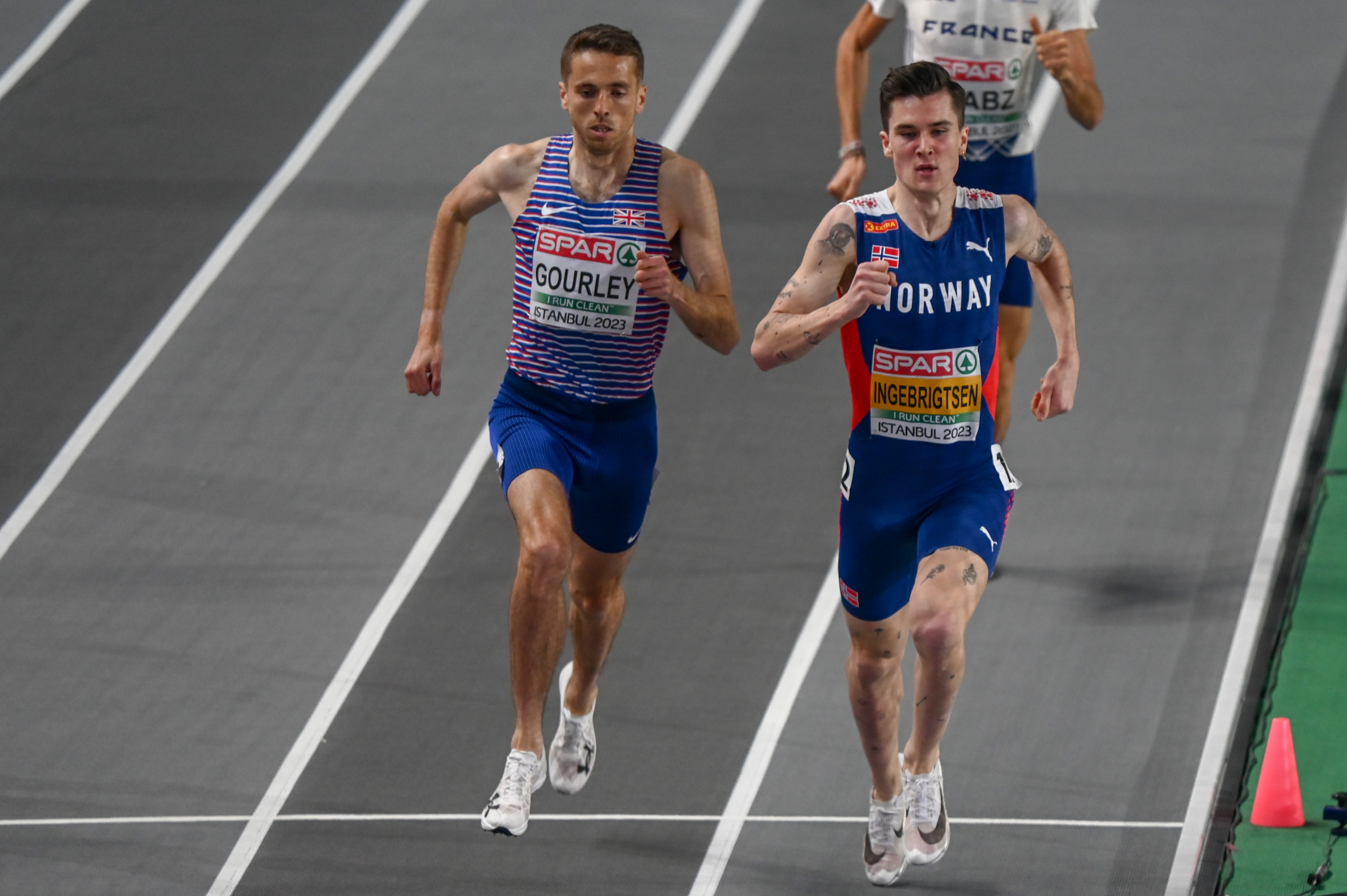
- The final underway.
- Venue: Ataköy Athletics Arena
- Location: Istanbul, Turkey
- Dates: 2 March 2023 (round 1); 3 March 2023 (final)
- Competitors: 23 from 15 nations
- Winning time: 3:33.95 CR

Medalists
gold medal	Jakob Ingebrigtsen	Norway
silver medal	Neil Gourley	Great Britain
bronze medal	Azeddine Habz	France

The men's 1500 metres event at the 2023 European Athletics Indoor Championships was held on 2 March 2023 at 21:05 (heats) and on 3 March at 20:40 (final) local time.

== Records ==
Standing records prior to the 2023 European Athletics Indoor Championships
World record	Jakob Ingebrigtsen (NOR)	3:30.60	Liévin, France	17 February 2022
European record	Jakob Ingebrigtsen (NOR)	3:30.60	Liévin, France	17 February 2022
Championship record	Ivan Heshko (UKR)	3:36.70	Madrid, Spain	6 March 2005
World Leading	Jakob Ingebrigtsen (NOR)	3:32.38	Liévin, France	15 February 2023
European Leading	Jakob Ingebrigtsen (NOR)	3:32.38	Liévin, France	15 February 2023

== Results ==
=== Heats ===
Qualification: First 3 in each heat (Q) and the next 3 fastest (q) advance to the Final.

Rank	Heat	Athlete	Nationality	Time	Note
1	3	Neil Gourley	Great Britain	3:41.08	Q
2	3	Jesús Gómez	Spain	3:41.26	Q
3	3	Ossama Meslek	Italy	3:41.34	Q
4	3	Louis Gilavert	France	3:41.45	q
5	3	Luke McCann	Ireland	3:41.51	q
6	3	Jan Friš	Czech Republic	3:41.57	q, SB
7	3	Pol Moya	Andorra	3:42.23	NR
8	3	David Nikolli	Albania	3:42.67	
9	2	Pietro Arese	Italy	3:43.97	Q
10	2	Michał Rozmys	Poland	3:43.97	Q
11	2	Ismael Debjani	Belgium	3:44.00	Q
12	3	Andrew Coscoran	Ireland	3:44.11	
13	2	Amos Bartelsmeyer	Germany	3:44.31	
14	2	Ignacio Fontes	Spain	3:44.33	
15	2	Ferdinand Kvan Edman	Norway	3:44.44	
16	2	Filip Sasínek	Czech Republic	3:44.76	
17	1	Azeddine Habz	France	3:49.88	Q
18	1	George Mills	Great Britain	3:50.01	Q
19	1	Jakob Ingebrigtsen	Norway	3:50.29	Q
20	1	Federico Riva	Italy	3:50.88	
21	1	Robin van Riel	Netherlands	3:51.08	
22	1	Isaac Nader	Portugal	3:52.73	
23	1	Emil Danielsson	Sweden	3:53.89	

=== Final ===
Rank	Athlete	Nationality	Time	Note
1st place, gold medalist(s)	Jakob Ingebrigtsen	Norway	3:33.95	CR
2nd place, silver medalist(s)	Neil Gourley	Great Britain	3:34.23	
3rd place, bronze medalist(s)	Azeddine Habz	France	3:35.39	
4	Jesús Gómez	Spain	3:38.11	
5	Pietro Arese	Italy	3:38.91	SB
6	Louis Gilavert	France	3:39.54	
7	Ismael Debjani	Belgium	3:40.06	
8	Jan Friš	Czech Republic	3:40.86	SB
9	Michał Rozmys	Poland	3:43.09	
10	Luke McCann	Ireland	3:44.55	
11	George Mills	Great Britain	3:51.28	
	Ossama Meslek	Italy	DNF	
