= 2022 World Athletics Indoor Championships – Men's 1500 metres =

Men's 1500 metres at the 2022 World Athletics Indoor Championships
- Venue: Štark Arena
- Dates: 19–20 March
- Competitors: 30 from 22 nations
- Winning time: 3:32.77

Medalists
gold medal	Samuel Tefera	Ethiopia
silver medal	Jakob Ingebrigtsen	Norway
bronze medal	Abel Kipsang	Kenya

The men's 1500 metres at the 2022 World Athletics Indoor Championships took place on 19–20 March 2022.

== Results ==
=== Heats ===
Qualification: First 2 in each heat (Q) and the next 4 fastest (q) advance to the Final. The heats were started at 12:15.

Rank	Heat	Name	Nationality	Time	Notes
1	3	Samuel Tefera	Ethiopia	3:37.05	Q
2	3	Pietro Arese	Italy	3:37.31	Q, SB
3	3	Isaac Nader	Portugal	3:37.60	q
4	4	Abel Kipsang	Kenya	3:37.67	Q
5	1	Teddese Lemi	Ethiopia	3:38.25	Q
6	1	Jakob Ingebrigtsen	Norway	3:38.42	Q
7	4	Oliver Hoare	Australia	3:38.43	Q
8	1	Joshua Thompson	United States	3:38.61	q
9	1	Michał Rozmys	Poland	3:38.61	q, SB
10	3	Samuel Prakel	United States	3:38.69	q, SB
11	3	Federico Bruno	Argentina	3:39.34	
12	4	Abdelatif Sadiki	Morocco	3:39.38	
13	1	Ismael Debjani	Belgium	3:39.47	
14	4	Cameron Proceviat	Canada	3:40.47	
15	4	Andrew Coscoran	Ireland	3:40.53	
16	2	Neil Gourley	Great Britain	3:42.79	Q
17	2	Robert Farken	Germany	3:43.10	Q
18	1	Saúl Ordóñez	Spain	3:43.67	
19	2	Ignacio Fontes	Spain	3:43.75	
20	1	Luke McCann	Ireland	3:44.03	
21	2	Charles Grethen	Luxembourg	3:44.87	
22	2	Eric Nzikwinkunda	Burundi	3:46.02	SB
23	3	Jack Anstey	Australia	3:46.68	
24	3	George Mills	Great Britain	3:47.41	
25	2	Abdelati El Guesse	Morocco	3:47.43	
26	4	Simas Bertašius	Lithuania	3:48.48	
27	4	Abraham Guem	South Sudan	3:48.82	NR
28	2	Nesim Amsellek	Italy	3:55.51	
29	2	Gaylord Silly	Seychelles	3:57.16	SB
30	4	Alaa Algorni	Libya	3:59.50	PB

=== Final ===
The final was started at 18:35.

Rank	Name	Nationality	Time	Notes
1st place, gold medalist(s)	Samuel Tefera	Ethiopia	3:32.77	CR
2nd place, silver medalist(s)	Jakob Ingebrigtsen	Norway	3:33.02	
3rd place, bronze medalist(s)	Abel Kipsang	Kenya	3:33.36	SB
4	Teddese Lemi	Ethiopia	3:33.59	SB
5	Oliver Hoare	Australia	3:34.36	SB
6	Neil Gourley	Great Britain	3:35.87	
7	Michał Rozmys	Poland	3:36.71	SB
8	Pietro Arese	Italy	3:37.60	
9	Samuel Prakel	United States	3:38.40	SB
10	Isaac Nader	Portugal	3:39.97	
11	Robert Farken	Germany	3:41.29	
12	Joshua Thompson	United States	3:44.48	
