= 2025 European Athletics Indoor Championships – Men's 3000 metres =

Men's 3000 metres at the 2025 European Athletics Indoor Championships
- Venue: Omnisport Apeldoorn
- Location: Apeldoorn, Netherlands
- Dates: 8 March 2025 (round 1); 9 March 2025 (final)
- Competitors: 23 from 11 nations
- Winning time: 7:48.37

Medalists
gold medal	Jakob Ingebrigtsen	Norway
silver medal	George Mills	Great Britain
bronze medal	Azeddine Habz	France

The men's 3000 metres at the 2025 European Athletics Indoor Championships was held on the short track of Omnisport in Apeldoorn, Netherlands, on 8 and 9 March 2025. This was the 38th time the event was contested at the European Athletics Indoor Championships. Athletes qualified by achieving the entry standard or by their World Athletics Ranking in the event.

== Background ==
The men's 3000 metres was contested 37 times before 2025, at every previous edition of the European Athletics Indoor Championships (1970–2023). The 2025 European Athletics Indoor Championships was held in Omnisport Apeldoorn in Apeldoorn, Netherlands. The removable indoor athletics track was retopped for these championships in September 2024.

Grant Fisher is the world record holder in the event, with a time of 7:22.91 set in 2025. Mohamed Katir is the European record holder with a time of 7:24.48, set in 2023. The championship record is 7:38.42, set by Ali Kaya at the 2015 championships.

Records before the 2025 European Athletics Indoor Championships
Record	Athlete (nation)	Time (s)	Location	Date
World record	Grant Fisher (USA)	7:22.91	New York City, United States	8 February 2025
European record	Mohamed Katir (ESP)	7:24.48	Karlsruhe, Germany	15 February 2023
Championship record	Ali Kaya (TUR)	7:38.42	Prague, Czech Republic	7 March 2015
World leading	Grant Fisher (USA)	7:22.91	New York City, United States	8 February 2025
European leading	George Mills (GBR)	7:27.92	Val-de-Reuil, France	2 February 2025

== Qualification ==
For the men's 3000 metres, the qualification period ran from 25 February 2024 until 23 February 2025. Athletes qualified by achieving the entry standards of 7:43.00 s indoors or 7:36.00 s outdoors, or by virtue of their World Athletics Ranking for the event. There was a target number of 24 athletes.

== Results ==
=== Round 1 ===
Round 1 was held on 8 March, starting at 12:45 (UTC+1) in the afternoon. First 6 in each heat (Q) qualified for the final.

==== Heat 1 ====
Rank	Athlete	Nation	Time	Notes
1	George Mills	Great Britain	7:50.87	Q
2	Andreas Almgren	Sweden	7:50.91	Q
3	James West	Great Britain	7:51.13	Q
4	Azeddine Habz	France	7:51.61	Q
5	Maximilian Thorwirth	Germany	7:51.72	Q
6	Miguel Moreira	Portugal	7:51.74	Q
7	Filip Ingebrigtsen	Norway	7:51.76	
8	James Gormley	Ireland	7:53.27	
9	Mike Foppen	Netherlands	7:53.32	
10	Bastien Augusto	France	7:53.53	
11	Ruben Verheyden	Belgium	7:53.76	

==== Heat 2 ====
Rank	Athlete	Nation	Time	Notes
1	Jakob Ingebrigtsen	Norway	7:55.32	Q
2	Romain Mornet	France	7:55.99	Q
3	Florian Bremm	Germany	7:56.17	Q
4	Stefan Nillessen	Netherlands	7:56.23	Q
5	Andrew Coscoran	Ireland	7:56.37	Q
6	Niels Laros	Netherlands	7:56.40	Q
7	Sam Parsons	Germany	7:56.68	
8	Adam Fogg	Great Britain	7:57.68	
9	Baldvin Magnusson	Iceland	7:58.56	
10	Duarte Gomes	Portugal	7:59.24	
11	John Heymans	Belgium	7:59.36	
12	Elzan Bibić	Serbia	8:01.67	

=== Final ===
The final was held on 9 March, starting at 16:50 (UTC+1) in the afternoon.

Rank	Athlete	Nation	Time	Notes
1st place, gold medalist(s)	Jakob Ingebrigtsen	Norway	7:48.37	SB
2nd place, silver medalist(s)	George Mills	Great Britain	7:49.41	
3rd place, bronze medalist(s)	Azeddine Habz	France	7:50.48	
4	Andreas Almgren	Sweden	7:50.66	
5	James West	Great Britain	7:51.46	
6	Andrew Coscoran	Ireland	7:51.77	
7	Florian Bremm	Germany	7:55.83 [.821]	
8	Stefan Nillessen	Netherlands	7:55.83 [.828]	
9	Maximilian Thorwirth	Germany	7:56.41	
10	Romain Mornet	France	7:56.98	
11	Niels Laros	Netherlands	7:57.18	
12	Miguel Moreira	Portugal	7:59.81	
