= 2022 European Athletics Championships – Men's 1500 metres =

Men's 1500 metres at the 2022 European Athletics Championships
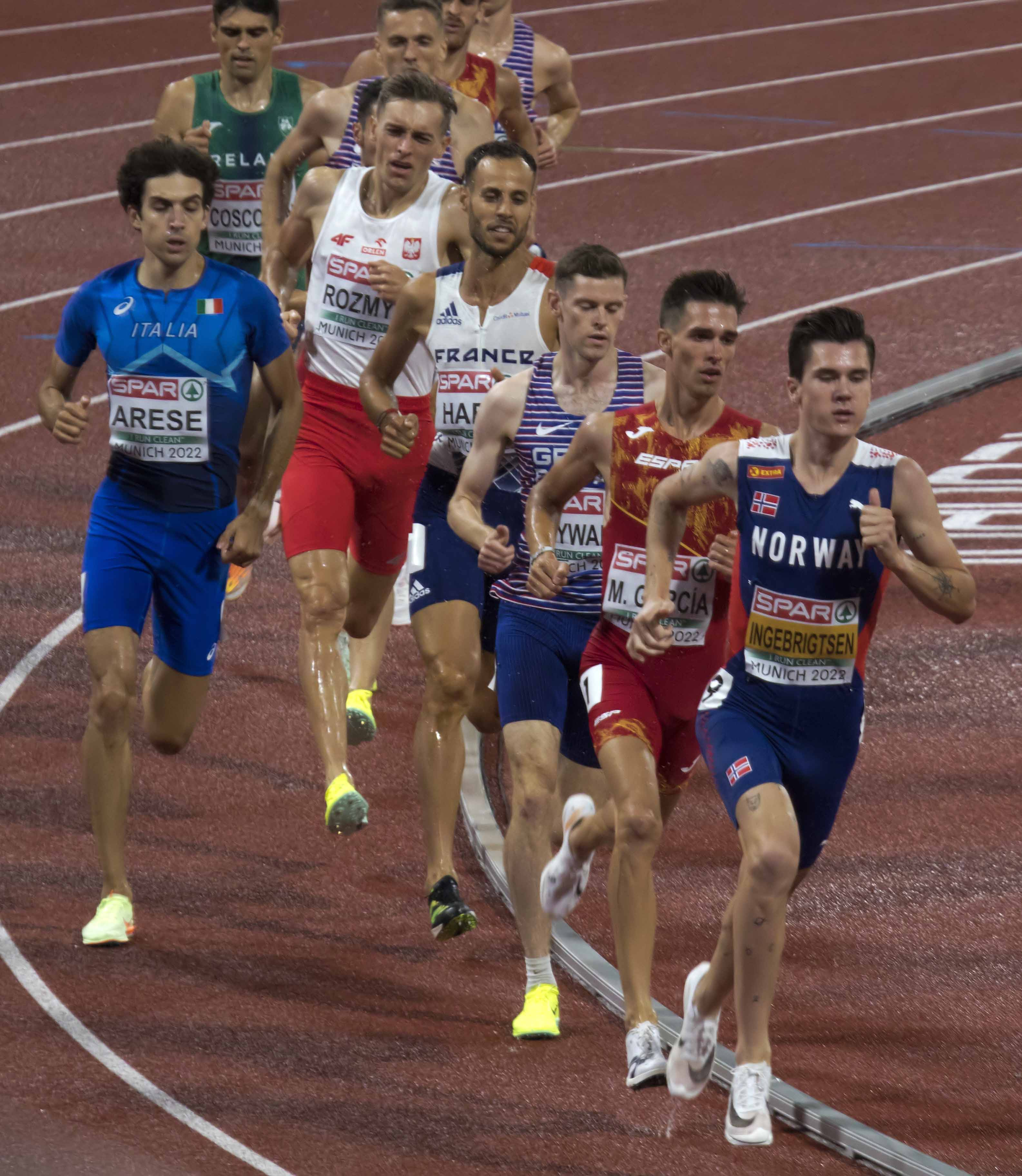
- Jakob Ingebrigtsen leads the final of the 1500 metres
- Venue: Olympiastadion
- Location: Munich
- Dates: 15 August (heats); 18 August (final)
- Competitors: 28 from 16 nations
- Winning time: 3:32.76 CR

Medalists
| gold medal | Jakob Ingebrigtsen | Norway |
| silver medal | Jake Heyward | Great Britain |
| bronze medal | Mario García | Spain |

The men's 1500 metres at the 2022 European Athletics Championships took place at the Olympiastadion on 15 and 18 August. Jakob Ingebrigtsen of Norway won the event in a championship record of 3:32.76.

== Records ==
Standing records prior to the 2022 European Athletics Championships
| World record | Hicham El Guerrouj (MAR) | 3:26.00 | Rome, Italy | 14 July 1998 |
| European record | Jakob Ingebrigtsen (NOR) | 3:28.32 | Tokyo, Japan | 7 August 2021 |
| Championship record | Fermín Cacho (ESP) | 3:35.27 | Helsinki, Finland | 9 August 1994 |
| World Leading | Jake Wightman (GBR) | 3:29.23 | Eugene, United States | 19 July 2022 |
| Europe Leading | Jake Wightman (GBR) | 3:29.23 | Eugene, United States | 19 July 2022 |

== Schedule ==
| Date | Time | Round |
|---|---|---|
| 15 August 2022 | 20:15 | Heats |
| 18 August 2022 | 21:05 | Final |

All times are local times (UTC+2)

== Results ==
=== Heats ===
First 4 in each heat (Q) and the next 4 fastest (q) advance to the Final.

| Rank | Heat | Name | Nationality | Time | Note |
|---|---|---|---|---|---|
| 1 | 2 | Michał Rozmys | Poland | 3:37.36 | Q |
| 2 | 2 | Pietro Arese | Italy | 3:37.95 | Q |
| 3 | 2 | Mario García | Spain | 3:38.04 | Q |
| 4 | 2 | Neil Gourley | Great Britain | 3:38.07 | Q |
| 5 | 2 | Matthew Stonier | Great Britain | 3:38.37 | q |
| 6 | 2 | Azeddine Habz | France | 3:38.47 | q |
| 7 | 1 | Jakob Ingebrigtsen | Norway | 3:38.48 | Q |
| 8 | 2 | Andrew Coscoran | Ireland | 3:38.74 | q |
| 9 | 1 | Ismael Debjani | Belgium | 3:38.96 | Q |
| 10 | 1 | Ignacio Fontes | Spain | 3:39.00 | Q |
| 11 | 1 | Gonzalo García | Spain | 3:39.20 | Q |
| 12 | 1 | Jake Heyward | Great Britain | 3:39.30 | q |
| 13 | 2 | Christoph Kessler | Germany | 3:39.32 | |
| 14 | 1 | Baptiste Mischler | France | 3:39.58 | |
| 15 | 2 | Simas Bertašius | Lithuania | 3:40.19 | |
| 16 | 1 | Charles Grethen | Luxembourg | 3:40.33 | |
| 17 | 1 | Samuel Pihlström | Sweden | 3:40.70 | |
| 18 | 1 | Luke McCann | Ireland | 3:40.98 | |
| 19 | 1 | Jan Friš | Czech Republic | 3:40.99 | |
| 20 | 2 | Ferdinand Kvan Edman | Norway | 3:41.30 | |
| 21 | 1 | Tarik Moukrime | Belgium | 3:41.46 | |
| 22 | 2 | Yervand Mkrtchyan | Armenia | 3:43.42 | |
| 23 | 2 | István Szögi | Hungary | 3:44.20 | |
| 24 | 1 | Isaac Nader | Portugal | 3:44.59 | |
| 25 | 2 | Ruben Verheyden | Belgium | 3:44.76 | |
| 26 | 1 | Mohamed Mohumed | Germany | 3:45.53 | |
| | 2 | Filip Sasínek | Czech Republic | Did not finish | |
| | 1 | Ossama Meslek | Italy | DQ | TR17.2.2 |

=== Final ===
| Rank | Name | Nationality | Time | Note |
|---|---|---|---|---|
| 1st place, gold medalist(s) | Jakob Ingebrigtsen | Norway | 3:32.76 | CR |
| 2nd place, silver medalist(s) | Jake Heyward | Great Britain | 3:34.44 | |
| 3rd place, bronze medalist(s) | Mario García | Spain | 3:34.88 | |
| 4 | Pietro Arese | Italy | 3:35.00 | PB |
| 5 | Matthew Stonier | Great Britain | 3:35.97 | |
| 6 | Gonzalo García | Spain | 3:37.40 | |
| 7 | Michał Rozmys | Poland | 3:37.63 | |
| 8 | Neil Gourley | Great Britain | 3:38.40 | |
| 9 | Andrew Coscoran | Ireland | 3:39.91 | |
| 10 | Azeddine Habz | France | 3:40.92 | |
| 11 | Ignacio Fontes | Spain | 3:42.30 | |
| 12 | Ismael Debjani | Belgium | 3:43.28 | |
