= 2024 European Athletics Championships – Men's 1500 metres =

Men's 1500 metres at the 2024 European Athletics Championships
- Venue: Stadio Olimpico
- Location: Rome
- Dates: 10 June (round 1); 12 June (final)
- Competitors: 31 from 15 nations
- Winning time: 3:31.95 CR

Medalists
gold medal	Jakob Ingebrigtsen	Norway
silver medal	Jochem Vermeulen	Belgium
bronze medal	Pietro Arese	Italy

The men's 1500 metres at the 2024 European Athletics Championships took place at the Stadio Olimpico on 10 and 12 June.

== Records ==
Standing records prior to the 2024 European Athletics Championships
World record	Hicham El-Guerrouj (MAR)	3:26.00	Rome, Italy	14 July 1998
European record	Jakob Ingebrigtsen (NOR)	3:27.14	Chorzów, Poland	16 July 2023
Championship record	Jakob Ingebrigtsen (NOR)	3:32.76	Munich, Germany	18 August 2022
World Leading	Jakob Ingebrigtsen (NOR)	3:29.74	Oslo, Norway	30 May 2024
Europe Leading	Jakob Ingebrigtsen (NOR)	3:29.74	Oslo, Norway	30 May 2024

== Schedule ==
Date	Time	Round
10 June 2024	11:20	Round 1
12 June 2024	22:26	Final

All times are local times (UTC+2)

== Results ==
=== Round 1 ===
First 6 in each heat (Q) advance to Final.

Rank	Heat	Name	Nationality	Time	Note
1	2	Jakob Ingebrigtsen	Norway	3:37.65	Q
2	2	Federico Riva	Italy	3:37.75	Q
3	2	Azeddine Habz	France	3:38.37	Q
4	2	Ossama Meslek	Italy	3:38.41	Q
5	2	Andrew Coscoran	Ireland	3:38.52	Q
6	2	Isaac Nader	Portugal	3:38.83	Q
7	2	Ignacio Fontes	Spain	3:39.02	qR
8	2	Jochem Vermeulen	Belgium	3:40.21	qR
9	2	Maciej Wyderka	Poland	3:40.37	
10	2	Adam Fogg	Great Britain	3:40.83	qR
11	2	Robert Farken	Germany	3:42.26	qR
12	2	Ismael Debjani	Belgium	3:42.57	SB
13	1	Neil Gourley	Great Britain	3:44.05	Q, SB
14	1	Pietro Arese	Italy	3:44.09	Q
15	1	Ruben Verheyden	Belgium	3:44.19	Q
16	1	Adel Mechaal	Spain	3:44.19	Q
17	1	Romain Mornet	France	3:44.28	Q
18	1	Raphael Pallitsch	Austria	3:44.29	Q
19	1	Mario García	Spain	3:44.30	
20	1	Mehmet Çelik	Turkey	3:44.65	
21	1	Marius Probst	Germany	3:44.70	
22	1	Filip Rak	Poland	3:45.21	
23	1	Maël Gouyette	France	3:45.22	
24	2	Noah Baltus	Netherlands	3:45.30	
25	2	Tom Elmer	Switzerland	3:45.91	
26	1	Narve Gilje Nordås	Norway	3:46.15	
27	1	Filip Ostrowski	Poland	3:46.18	
28	1	Nicholas Griggs	Ireland	3:46.66	
29	1	Amos Bartelsmeyer	Germany	3:51.42	
30	1	Emil Danielsson	Sweden	3:51.67	
31	2	Samuel Pihlström	Sweden	4:38.51	qR

=== Final ===
The final was held on the 12 June 2024. 17 Athletes competed after 5 fallen runners were reinstated.

Rank	Name	Nationality	Time	Note
1st place, gold medalist(s)	Jakob Ingebrigtsen	Norway	3:31.95	CR
2nd place, silver medalist(s)	Jochem Vermeulen	Belgium	3:33.30	PB
3rd place, bronze medalist(s)	Pietro Arese	Italy	3:33.34	
4	Ruben Verheyden	Belgium	3:33.40	PB
5	Adel Mechaal	Spain	3:33.58	
6	Raphael Pallitsch	Austria	3:33.60	
7	Azeddine Habz	France	3:33.70	
8	Robert Farken	Germany	3:33.98	
9	Neil Gourley	Great Britain	3:34.11	SB
10	Isaac Nader	Portugal	3:34.22	
11	Romain Mornet	France	3:34.33	SB
12	Adam Fogg	Great Britain	3:34.44	
13	Andrew Coscoran	Ireland	3:34.76	
14	Ossama Meslek	Italy	3:36.35	
15	Federico Riva	Italy	3:37.37	
16	Ignacio Fontes	Spain	3:45.80	
	Samuel Pihlström	Sweden	DNS	
