= Ignacio Fontes =

Spanish middle-distance runner

Personal information
- Full name: Ignacio Fontes García-Balibrea
- Nationality: Spanish
- Born: 22 June 1998 (age 28) Granada, Spain

Sport
- Sport: Athletics
- Event: 1500 metres
- Club: CD Nike Running
- Coached by: Jesús Montiel

Ignacio Fontes García-Balibrea (born 22 June 1998 in Granada) is a Spanish athlete. He specializes in middle-distances and has represented Spain in numerous events, including age group competitions and cross.country championships. He debuted at absolute level competition at the 2021 European Athletics Indoor Championships in Toruń, Poland.

== Personal bests ==
Outdoor

- 800 metres: 1:46.79 (Barcelona 2019)
- 1500 metres: 3:33.27 (Stockholm 2021)
- Mile: 3:54.38 (Eugene 2022)
- 10 km: 28:57 (Madrid 2021)

Indoor

- 800 metres: 1:49.19 (Antequera 2017)
- 1500 metres: 3:36.89 (Liévin 2021)
- 3000 metres: 7:50.33 (Valencia 2021)

== Competition record ==
Year	Competition	Venue	Position	Event	Notes
Representing Spain
2014	European Youth Olympic Trials	Baku, Azerbaijan	5th	800 m	1:53.50
2015	World Youth Championships	Cali, Colombia	6th	1500 m	3:48.83
2016	World U20 Championships	Bydgoszcz, Poland	5th (s)	800 m	1:48.88
2017	European U20 Championships	Grosseto, Italy	(s)	800 m	DNF
2018	Mediterranean U23 Championships	Jesolo, Italy	2nd	1500 m	3:48.29
2019	Mediterranean Indoor U23 Championships	Miramas, France	4th	1500 m	3:47.79
2019	European U23 Championships	Gävle, Sweden	1st	1500 m	3:50.38
2021	European Indoor Championships	Toruń, Poland	4th	1500 m	3:39.66
2021	Olympic Games	Tokyo, Japan	13th	1500 m	3:38.56
2022	World Indoor Championships	Belgrade, Serbia	19th (h)	1500 m	3:43.75
2022	World Championships	Eugene, United States	11th	1500 m	3:34.71
2022	European Championships	Munich, Germany	11th	1500 m	3:42.30
2023	European Indoor Championships	Istanbul, Turkey	14th (h)	1500 m	3:44.33
2024	European Championships	Rome, Italy	16th	1500 m	3:45.80
2024	Olympic Games	Paris, France	9th (rep)	1500 m	3:35.04
2025	European Indoor Championships	Apeldoorn, Netherlands	15th (h)	1500 m i	3:42.28
