= Ismael Debjani =

Belgian middle-distance runner

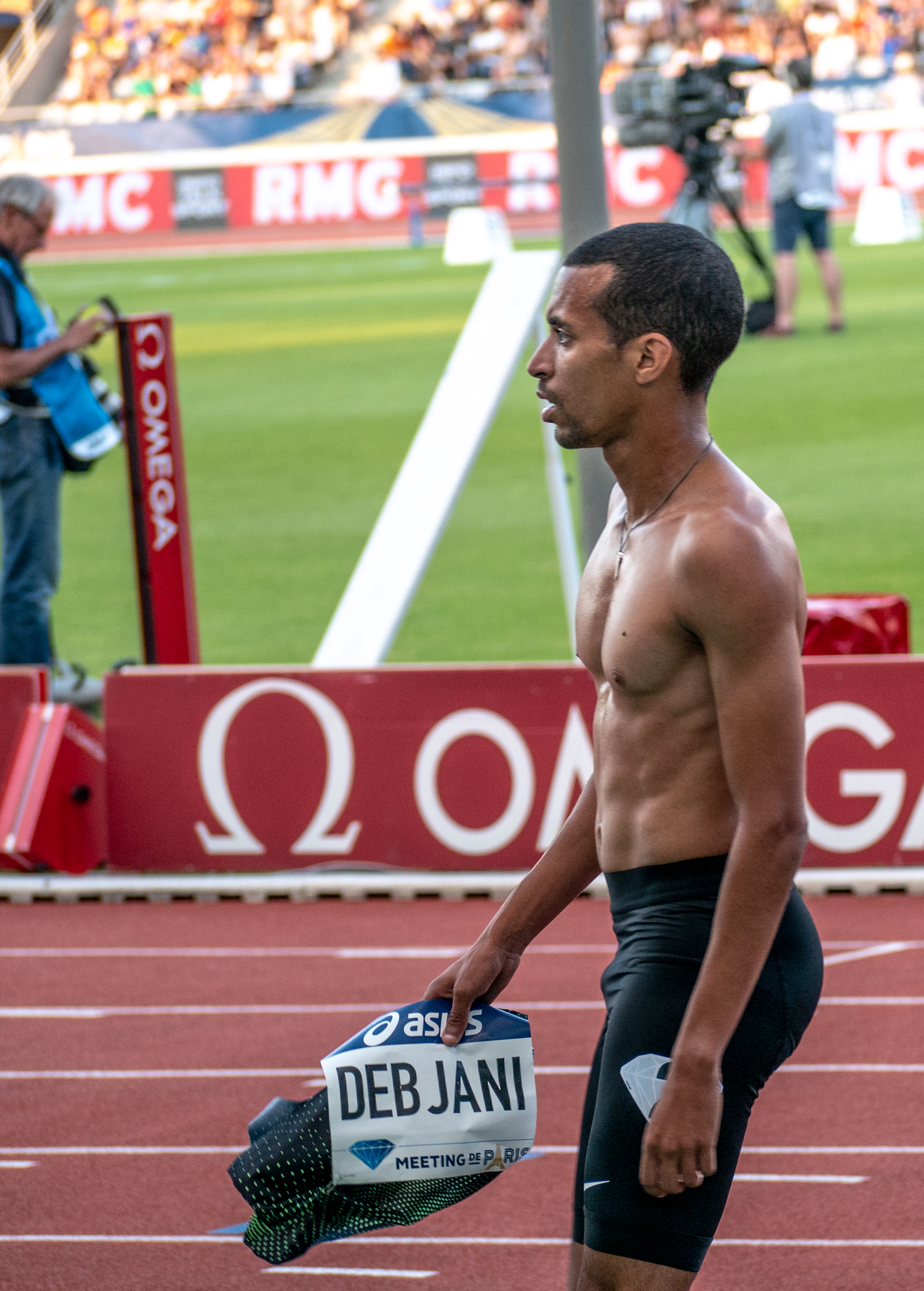
- Debjani in 2018

Personal information
- Born: 25 September 1990 (age 35) Montignies-sur-Sambre, Charleroi, Belgium
- Education: Université catholique de Louvain
- Height: 1.75 m (5 ft 9 in)
- Weight: 61 kg (134 lb)

Sport
- Sport: Athletics
- Event: 1500 metres
- Club: CABW
- Coached by: Christophe Dumont

Ismael Debjani (born 25 September 1990) is a Belgian middle-distance runner who competes primarily in the 1500 metres. He represented his country at the 2017 World Championships without advancing from the first round.

He is the current Belgian national record holder in the indoor 1500 metres.

== Personal life ==
Born in Belgium, Debjani is of Moroccan descent.

== International competitions ==
Year	Competition	Venue	Position	Event	Notes
Representing Belgium
2016	European Championships	Amsterdam, Netherlands	11th	1500 m	3:49.12
2017	World Championships	London, United Kingdom	22nd (h)	1500 m	3:43.71
2018	European Championships	Berlin, Germany	8th	1500 m	3:39.48
2019	World Championships	Doha, Qatar	31st (h)	1500 m	3:39.11
2021	Olympic Games	Tokyo, Japan	22nd (sf)	1500 m	3:42.18
2022	World Indoor Championships	Belgrade, Serbia	13th (h)	1500 m	3:39.47
2022	World Championships	Eugene, United States	34th (h)	1500 m	3:39.96
2022	European Championships	Munich, Germany	12th	1500 m	3:43.28
2023	European Indoor Championships	Istanbul, Turkey	7th	1500 m	3:40.06
2023	World Championships	Budapest, Hungary	39th (h)	1500 m	3:39.73
2024	European Championships	Rome, Italy	12th (h)	1500 m	3:42.57

== Personal bests ==
Outdoor

- 800 metres – 1:46.31 (Oordegem 2021)
- 1000 metres – 2:18.44 (Brussels 2020)
- 1500 metres – 3:33.06 (Geneva 2021)
- One mile – 3:52.70 (Oslo 2021)
- 3000 metres – 8:00.17 (Herentals 2017)
- 5000 metres – 13:32.45 (Heusden-Zolder 2022)

Indoor

- 1000 metres – 2:19.02 (Ghent 2020)
- 1500 metres – 3:36.38 (Ostrava 2022) NR
- 3000 metres – 7:53.16 (Louvain-La-Neuve 2022)
