= 2026 World Athletics Ultimate Championship – Men's 5000 metres =

Men's 5000 metres at the 2026 World Athletics Ultimate Championship
- Venue: National Athletics Centre
- Location: Budapest, Hungary
- Dates: 11 September 2026 (final)
- Competitors: 12 from 6 nations
- Winning time: 12:59.24 min

Champion
- Jakob Ingebrigtsen; Norway

The men's 5000 metres was held as a straight final at the 2026 World Athletics Ultimate Championship at the National Athletics Centre in Budapest, Hungary on 11 September 2026. It was the first time the World Ultimate Championship is held. Athletes qualified by wildcard or by their world ranking.

== Background ==
Global records before the 2026 World Athletics Ultimate Championship
| Record | Time | Athlete (nation) | Location | Date |
|---|---|---|---|---|
| World record | 12:35.36 | Joshua Cheptegei (UGA) | Fontvieille, Monaco | 14 August 2020 |
| World lead | 12:45.70 | Birhanu Balew (BHR) | Brussels, Belgium | 5 September 2026 |

Area records before the 2026 World Athletics Ultimate Championship
| Record | Time | Athlete (nation) | Location | Date |
|---|---|---|---|---|
| African record | 12:35.36 | Joshua Cheptegei (UGA) | Fontvieille, Monaco | 14 August 2020 |
| Asian record | 12:45.70 | Birhanu Balew (BHR) | Brussels, Belgium | 5 September 2026 |
| European record | 12:44.27 | Andreas Almgren (SWE) | Stockholm, Sweden | 15 June 2025 |
| North, Central American, and Caribbean record | 12:44.09 i | Grant Fisher (USA) | Boston, United States | 14 February 2025 |
| Oceanian record | 12:50.82 | Ky Robinson (AUS) | Oslo, Norway | 10 June 2026 |
| South American record | 12:59.26 | Santiago Catrofe (URU) | Paris, France | 20 June 2025 |

== Qualification ==
For the 5000 metres, twelve athletes qualified, up to three by wildcard for winners of the event at the 2024 Summer Olympic, the 2025 World Athletics Championships, or the 2026 Diamond League final and the others by their position at the World Athletics Rankings for the event on 3 September 2026.

== Results ==
=== Final ===
The final was held on 11 September at 20:12 (UTC+2).

| Place | Athlete | Nation | Time | Notes |
|---|---|---|---|---|
| 1st place, gold medalist(s) | Jakob Ingebrigtsen | Norway | 12:59.24 | SB |
| 2 | Cole Hocker | United States | 13:00.05 | SB |
| 3 | Parker Wolfe | United States | 13:00.13 | |
| 4 | Biniam Mehary | Ethiopia | 13:00.24 | |
| 5 | Nico Young | United States | 13:00.26 | |
| 6 | Grant Fisher | United States | 13:00.34 | |
| 7 | Graham Blanks | United States | 13:00.40 | |
| 8 | Egide Ntakarutimana | Burundi | 13:01.91 | |
| 9 | Ky Robinson | Australia | 13:04.09 | |
| 10 | Jacob Krop | Kenya | 13:06.62 | |
| 11 | Cornelius Kemboi | Kenya | 13:07.68 | |
| — | Addisu Yihune | Ethiopia | DNF | |
