= 2025 European Athletics Indoor Championships – Men's 1500 metres =

Men's 1500 metres at the 2025 European Athletics Indoor Championships
- Venue: Omnisport Apeldoorn
- Location: Apeldoorn, Netherlands
- Dates: 6 March 2025 (round 1); 7 March 2025 (final)
- Competitors: 26 from 16 nations
- Winning time: 3:36.56

Medalists
gold medal	Jakob Ingebrigtsen	Norway
silver medal	Azeddine Habz	France
bronze medal	Isaac Nader	Portugal

The men's 1500 metres at the 2025 European Athletics Indoor Championships was held on the short track of Omnisport in Apeldoorn, Netherlands, on 6 and 7 March 2025. This was the 37th time the event was contested at the European Athletics Indoor Championships. Athletes qualified by achieving the entry standard or by their World Athletics Ranking in the event.

== Background ==
The men's 1500 metres was contested 36 times before 2025, held every time since the second edition of the European Athletics Indoor Championships (1971–2023). The 2025 European Athletics Indoor Championships was held in Omnisport Apeldoorn in Apeldoorn, Netherlands. The removable indoor athletics track was retopped for these championships in September 2024.

Jakob Ingebrigtsen is the world and European record holder, with a time of 3:29.63+, set in 2025. Ingebrigtsen also holds the championship record with a time of 3:33.95, set at the 2023 championships.

Records before the 2025 European Athletics Indoor Championships
Record	Athlete (nation)	Time (s)	Location	Date
World record	Jakob Ingebrigtsen (NOR)	3:29.63+	Liévin, France	13 February 2025
European record	Jakob Ingebrigtsen (NOR)	3:29.63+	Liévin, France	13 February 2025
World leading	Jakob Ingebrigtsen (NOR)	3:29.63+	Liévin, France	13 February 2025
European leading	Jakob Ingebrigtsen (NOR)	3:29.63+	Liévin, France	13 February 2025
Championship record	Jakob Ingebrigtsen (NOR)	3:33.95	Istanbul, Turkey	3 March 2023

== Qualification ==
For the men's 1500 metres, the qualification period ran from 25 February 2024 until 23 February 2025. Athletes qualified by achieving the entry standards of 3:37.00 s indoors or 3:32.00 s outdoor, or by virtue of their World Athletics Ranking for the event. There was a target number of 27 athletes.

== Results ==
=== Round 1 ===
Round 1 was held on 6 March, starting at 19:55 (UTC+1) in the evening. First 3 in each heat (Q) qualified for the final.

==== Heat 1 ====
Rank	Athlete	Nation	Time	Notes
1	Jakob Ingebrigtsen	Norway	3:37.49	Q
2	Louis Gilavert	France	3:38.11	Q
3	Ruben Verheyden	Belgium	3:38.21	Q
4	Nuno Pereira	Portugal	3:38.25	
5	Mahadi Abdi Ali	Netherlands	3:39.31	
6	Thomas Keen	Great Britain	3:40.10	
7	Marius Probst	Germany	3:41.32	
8	Pol Moya	Andorra	3:41.48	
9	Cathal Doyle	Ireland	3:48.15	

==== Heat 2 ====
Rank	Athlete	Nation	Time	Notes
1	Isaac Nader	Portugal	3:42.32	Q
2	Robert Farken	Germany	3:42.33	Q
3	Paul Anselmini	France	3:42.47	Q
4	Mohamed Attaoui	Spain	3:42.53	
5	Federico Riva	Italy	3:42.55	
6	Robin van Riel	Netherlands	3:45.60	
7	Joonas Rinne	Finland	3:48.68	
8	Jochem Vermeulen	Belgium	3:54.33	

==== Heat 3 ====
Rank	Athlete	Nation	Time	Notes
1	Neil Gourley	Great Britain	3:40.24	Q
2	Azeddine Habz	France	3:40.43	Q
3	Samuel Pihlström	Sweden	3:40.52	Q
4	Raphael Pallitsch	Austria	3:40.96	
5	Filip Rak	Poland	3:41.43	
6	Noah Baltus	Netherlands	3:42.25	
7	Ignacio Fontes	Spain	3:42.28	
8	Yervand Mkrtchyan	Armenia	3:42.60	SB
9	Pieter Sisk	Belgium	3:43.02	

=== Final ===
The final was held on 7 March, starting at 21:15 (UTC+1) in the evening.

Rank	Athlete	Nation	Time	Notes
1st place, gold medalist(s)	Jakob Ingebrigtsen	Norway	3:36.56	
2nd place, silver medalist(s)	Azeddine Habz	France	3:36.92	
3rd place, bronze medalist(s)	Isaac Nader	Portugal	3:37.10	
4	Neil Gourley	Great Britain	3:38.29	
5	Louis Gilavert	France	3:38.84	
6	Samuel Pihlström	Sweden	3:39.07	
7	Ruben Verheyden	Belgium	3:41.70	
—	Robert Farken	Germany	DNF	
—	Paul Anselmini	France	DQ	TR17.1.2
