= Jakob Ingebrigtsen =

Norwegian middle- and long-distance runner (born 2000)

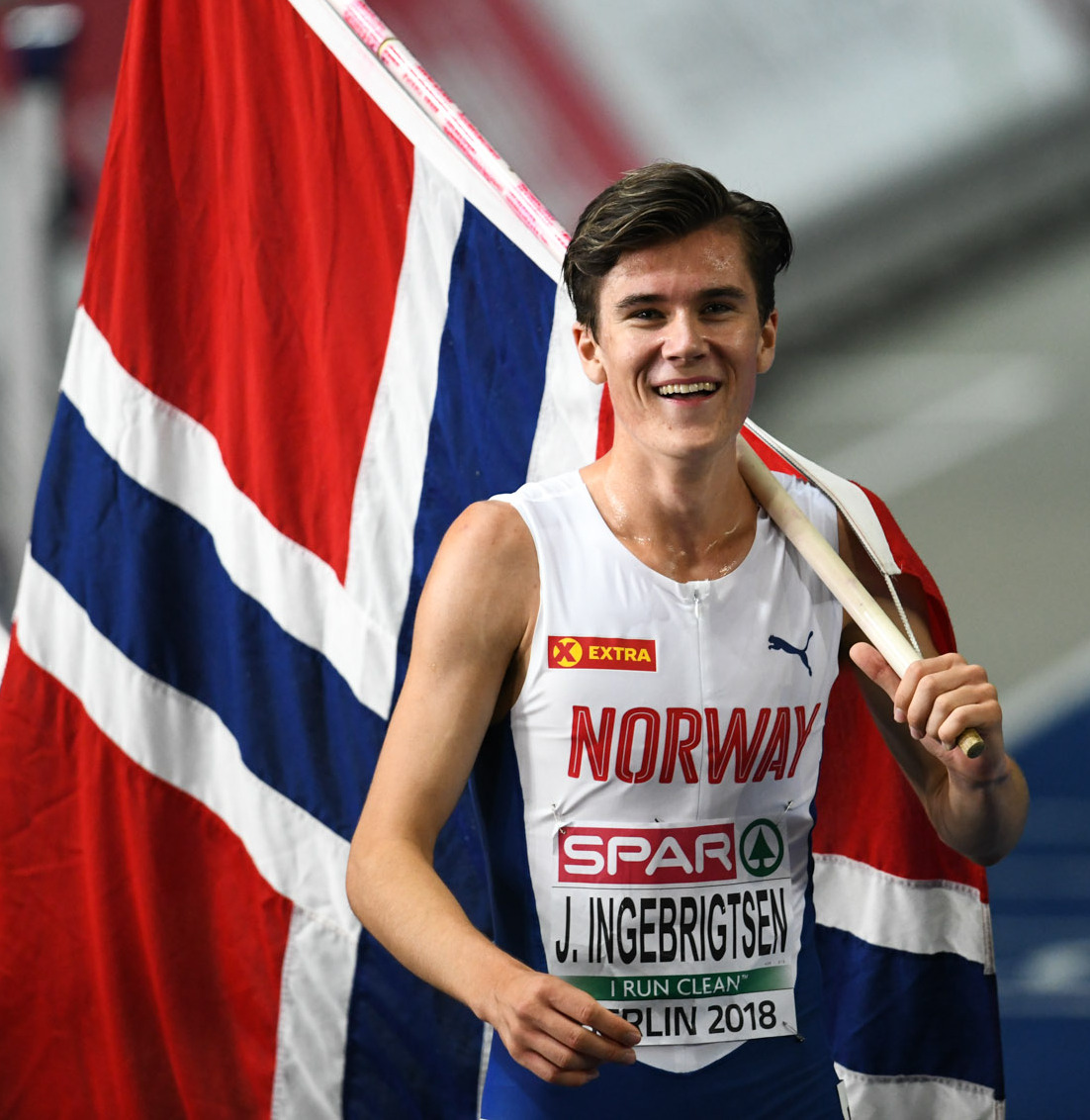
- Ingebrigtsen at the 2018 European Athletics Championships

Personal information
- Full name: Jakob Asserson Ingebrigtsen
- Born: 19 September 2000 (age 26) Sandnes, Rogaland, Norway
- Education: Sandnes Upper Secondary School
- Height: 1.86 m (6 ft 1 in)
- Spouse: Elisabeth Asserson

Sport
- Country: Norway
- Sport: Athletics
- Events: Middle-, long-distance running
- Club: Nike
- Coached by: Self-coached (2022–present); Gjert Ingebrigtsen (–2022)

Achievements and titles
- Highest world ranking: 1st (1500 m, 2023)
- Personal bests: Outdoors; 400 m: 51.03 (2017); 800 m: 1:46.44 (2020); 1500 m: 3:26.73 (2024, AR); Mile: 3:43.73 (2023, NR); 2000 m: 4:43.13 (2023, WR); 3000 m: 7:17.55 (2024, WR); 3000 m s'chase: 8:26.81 (2017, NU18B NU20R); 2 miles: 7:54.10 (2023, WB); 5000 m: 12:48.45 (2021, NR); Indoors; 800 m: 1:52.01i(2018); 1500 m: 3:29.63+i (2025, WR); Mile: 3:45.14i (2025, WR); 3000 m: 7:40.32i (2023, NR); Road; 5 km: 12:59 (2026, NR); 10 km: 27:27+ (2024, NR); Half marathon: 1:03:13 (2024)
Medal record
Men's athletics
Representing Norway
Event	1st	2nd	3rd
Olympic Games	2	0	0
World Championships	2	2	0
World Ultimate Championships	1	0	0
World Indoor Championships	2	1	0
World Road Running Championships	0	1	0
Diamond League	4	0	0
European Championships	7	0	0
European Indoor Championships	7	1	0
World Junior Championships	0	1	1
European Junior Championships	2	0	0
Total	27	6	1
Olympic Games
Gold medal – first place	2020 Tokyo	1500 m
Gold medal – first place	2024 Paris	5000 m
World Championships
Gold medal – first place	2022 Eugene	5000 m
Gold medal – first place	2023 Budapest	5000 m
Silver medal – second place	2022 Eugene	1500 m
Silver medal – second place	2023 Budapest	1500 m
World Ultimate Championship
First place	2026 Budapest	5000 m
World Indoor Championships
Gold medal – first place	2025 Nanjing	1500 m
Gold medal – first place	2025 Nanjing	3000 m
Silver medal – second place	2022 Belgrade	1500 m
World Road Running Championships
Silver medal – second place	2026 Copenhagen	5K
Diamond League
First place	2022	1500 m
First place	2023	Mile
First place	2023	3000 m
First place	2024	1500 m
European Championships
Gold medal – first place	2018 Berlin	1500 m
Gold medal – first place	2018 Berlin	5000 m
Gold medal – first place	2022 Munich	1500 m
Gold medal – first place	2022 Munich	5000 m
Gold medal – first place	2024 Rome	1500 m
Gold medal – first place	2024 Rome	5000 m
Gold medal – first place	2026 Birmingham	5000 m
European Indoor Championships
Gold medal – first place	2019 Glasgow	3000 m
Gold medal – first place	2021 Toruń	1500 m
Gold medal – first place	2021 Toruń	3000 m
Gold medal – first place	2023 Istanbul	1500 m
Gold medal – first place	2023 Istanbul	3000 m
Gold medal – first place	2025 Apeldoorn	1500 m
Gold medal – first place	2025 Apeldoorn	3000 m
Silver medal – second place	2019 Glasgow	1500 m
World Junior Championships
Silver medal – second place	2018 Tampere	1500 m
Bronze medal – third place	2018 Tampere	5000 m
European Junior Championships
Gold medal – first place	2017 Grosseto	5000 m
Gold medal – first place	2017 Grosseto	3000 m s'chase
European Cross Country Championships
Gold medal – first place	2016 Chia	Junior race
Gold medal – first place	2017 Šamorín	Junior race
Gold medal – first place	2018 Tilburg	Junior race
Gold medal – first place	2018 Tilburg	Junior team
Gold medal – first place	2019 Lisbon	Junior race
Gold medal – first place	2021 Dublin	Senior Men
Gold medal – first place	2022 Turin	Senior Men
Gold medal – first place	2024 Antalya	Senior Men
Silver medal – second place	2019 Lisbon	Junior team
Representing Europe
Continental Cup
Bronze medal – third place	2018 Ostrava	1500 m

Jakob Asserson Ingebrigtsen (born 19 September 2000) is a Norwegian middle- and long-distance runner. He holds world records in the short track 1500 metres, short track mile, 2000 metres, and 3000 metres, as well as the world best for two miles. (Note: Ingebrigtsen's time in the 2-mile is recognized as a world best rather than an official world record by World Athletics, the international governing body for athletics. See world best performances.) Ingebrigtsen is a two-time Olympic champion, winning the 1500 metres at the 2020 Tokyo Olympics and the 5000 metres at the 2024 Paris Olympics. He also won consecutive 5000 metres titles at the 2022 and 2023 World Athletics Championships, the 1500 metres and 3000 metres double at the 2025 World Athletics Indoor Championships, and the 5000 metres at the inaugural 2026 World Athletics Ultimate Championship.

Ingebrigtsen is a seven-time European champion and seven-time European indoor champion. He completed the 1500 metres and 5000 metres double at three consecutive European Championships and the 1500 metres and 3000 metres double at three consecutive European Indoor Championships. He is also a three-time senior European cross country champion and four-time Diamond League Final winner.

The youngest of the Ingebrigtsen brothers, Jakob has two older brothers, Henrik and Filip, who are also international middle-distance runners. All three were coached by their father, Gjert, until 2022. Ingebrigtsen achieved early success as a junior, becoming, at age 16, the youngest man at the time to run a sub-four minute mile. He also won four consecutive junior titles at the European Cross Country Championships, claimed the 5000 metres title at the 2017 European Athletics U20 Championships, and set a European under-20 record in the 3000 metres steeplechase.

Ingebrigtsen has twice been named European Athlete of the Year and has also received the European Athletics Rising Star of the Year award. He has been nominated four times for the World Athletics Athlete of the Year award and once for the Laureus World Sports Breakthrough of the Year.

== Early life and background ==
Ingebrigtsen was born in Sandnes, Norway to Gjert and Tone Eva Ingebrigtsen, part of the Ingebrigtsen family of athletes. He has six siblings, with two of his older brothers, Henrik and Filip, also being professional runners.

By his own account, Ingebrigtsen was training in a professional style since age four or five. He tried multiple sports, including cross-country skiing and football, but committed to running by age nine. By age twelve, he had a focused training plan including weight lifting and running over 100 kilometres a week. Throughout their childhood, the Ingebrigtsen brothers were coached by their father Gjert, who had no professional running or coaching background but took an interest in his sons' athletic careers. He began reading books and consulting with other coaches in order to fill the role.

Ingebrigtsen graduated from Sandnes Upper Secondary School in 2019. Since 2022, he has been self-coached alongside input from his brothers Henrik and Filip. He credits much of his success to his father refining training plans that had been used by his older brothers, saying "Henrik has done a lot of stupid things, Filip has done some and I haven't really done anything stupid. That's why I am going to run so fast in the end."

== Youth and junior career ==
=== 2017: Youngest sub four-minute mile ===
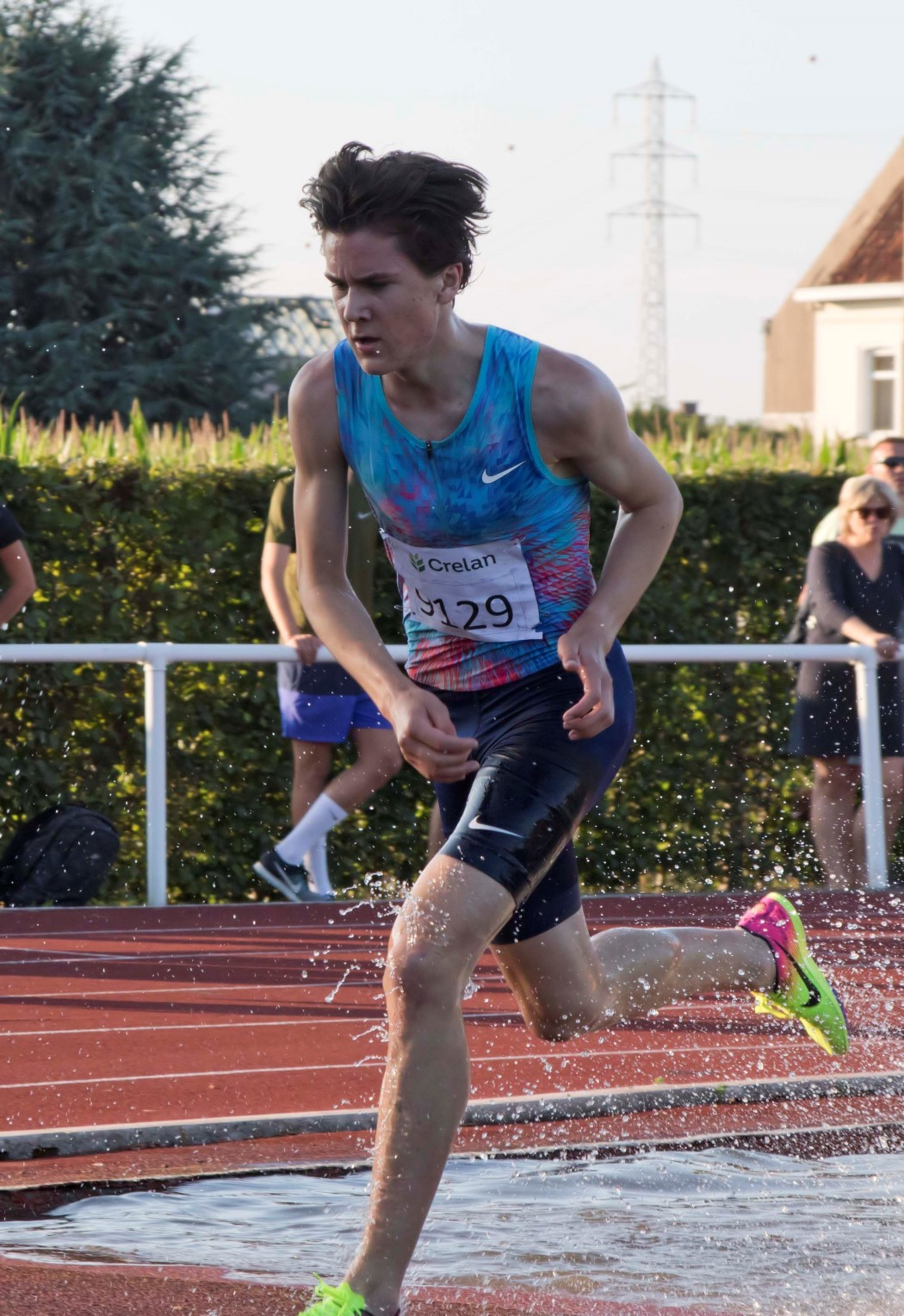
Ingebrigtsen at the Guldensporenmeeting in Kortrijk, Belgium in 2017.

On 27 May, still 16 years old, Ingebrigtsen became the youngest athlete in history at the time to run the mile in less than four minutes, when he ran 3:58.07, finishing in eleventh place at the Prefontaine Classic in Eugene, Oregon. This age record has since beaten by Sam Ruthe of New Zealand, who ran 3:58.35 in 2025 at the age of 15. On 15 June, Ingebrigtsen ran almost two seconds faster, when he won a mile run with a time of 3:56.29 at the Bislett Games in Oslo, Norway. Ingebrigtsen's time stood as an age group world record until Cameron Myers of Australia broke it in 2023, with a time of 3:55.44. On 8 July, in his first attempt at the distance, he beat the European Under-20 record in the 3000 metres steeplechase at the Guldensporenmeeting in Kortrijk, Belgium with a time of 8:26.81.

=== 2018: European champion in 1500 and 5000 metres ===
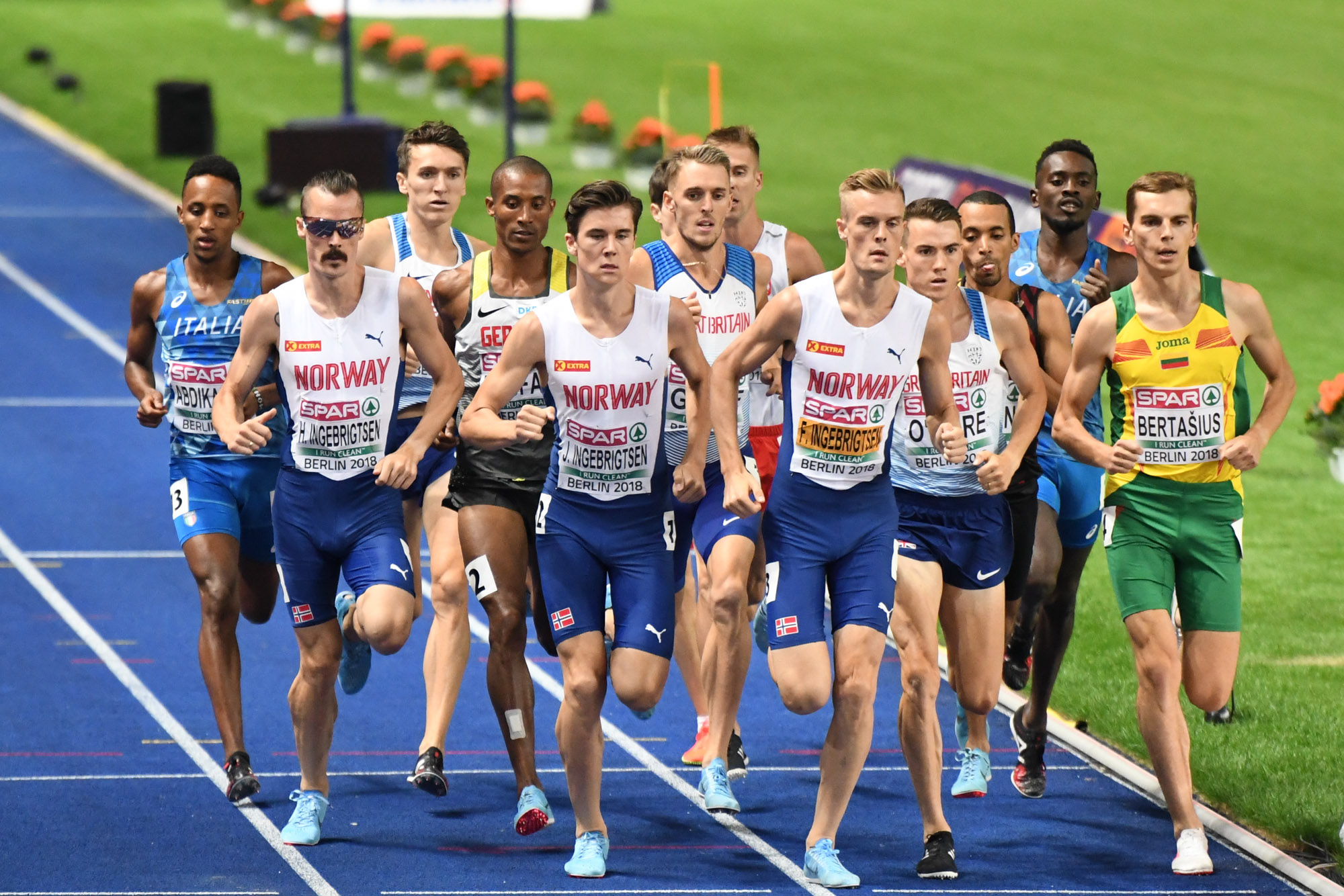
Ingebrigtsen brothers (in white) lead the pack in the race (L-R): Henrik, Jakob and Filip.

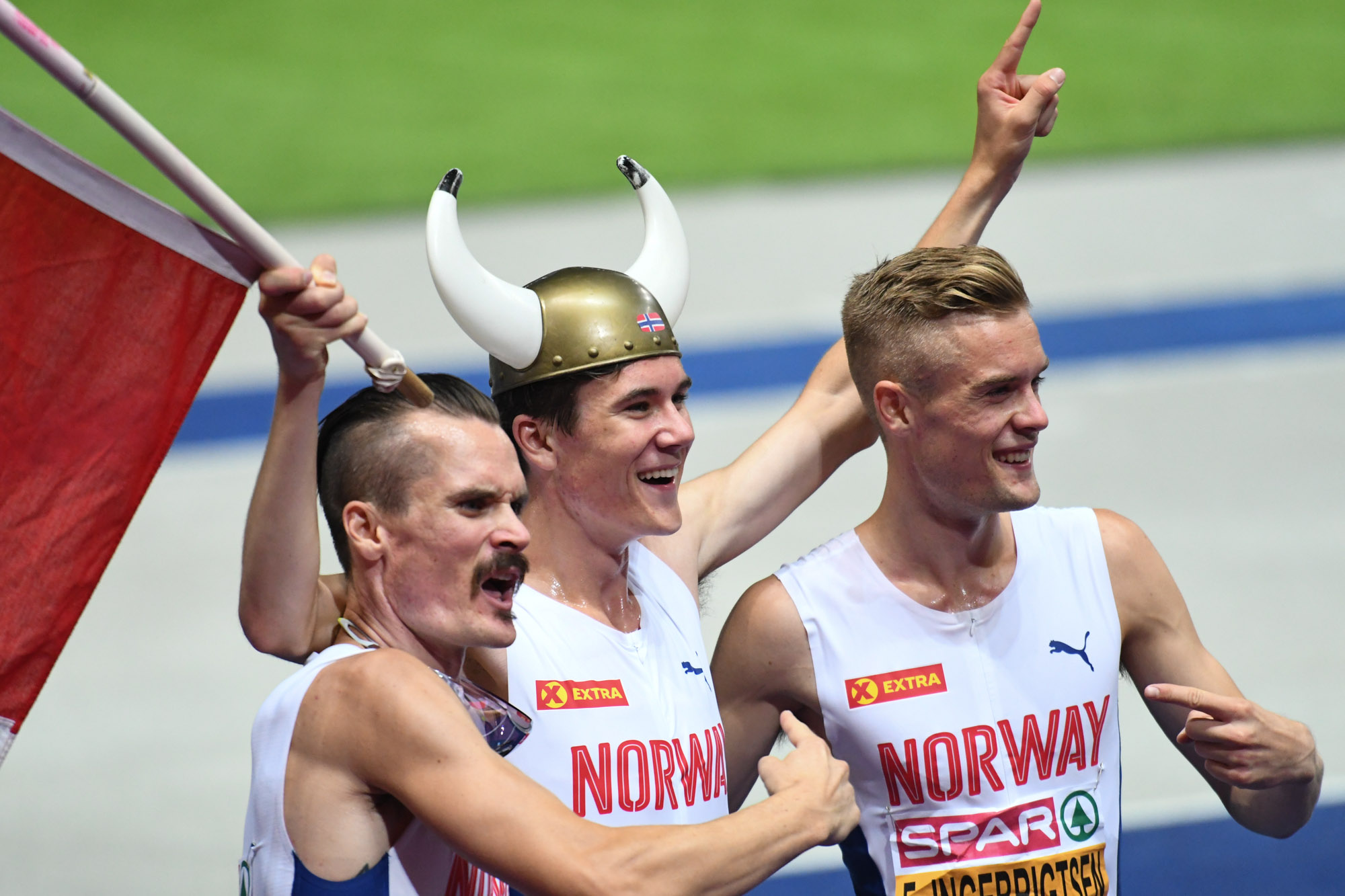
Brothers celebrate after the race (L-R): Henrik (4th), Jakob (1st) and Filip (12th).

1500 m final at the 2018 European Athletics Championships in Berlin

On 26 May, at age 17, Ingebrigtsen finished fourth in the Prefontaine Classic's Bowerman Mile, with a time of 3:52.28. It was the fastest mile ever run by a 17-year-old at the time. In August, Ingebrigtsen ran at the 2018 European Athletics Championships. In the 1500 metres, running alongside his brothers Henrik and Filip, he won gold with a time of 3:38.10, becoming the youngest ever European champion in this event. The next day, Ingebrigtsen ran in the 5000 metres final, winning again to become the first man ever to achieve the 1500 / 5000 metres double at the European championships. His time of 13:17.06 also broke his own European under-20 record.

=== 2019: European under-20 record in 5000 metres and 10 kilometres ===
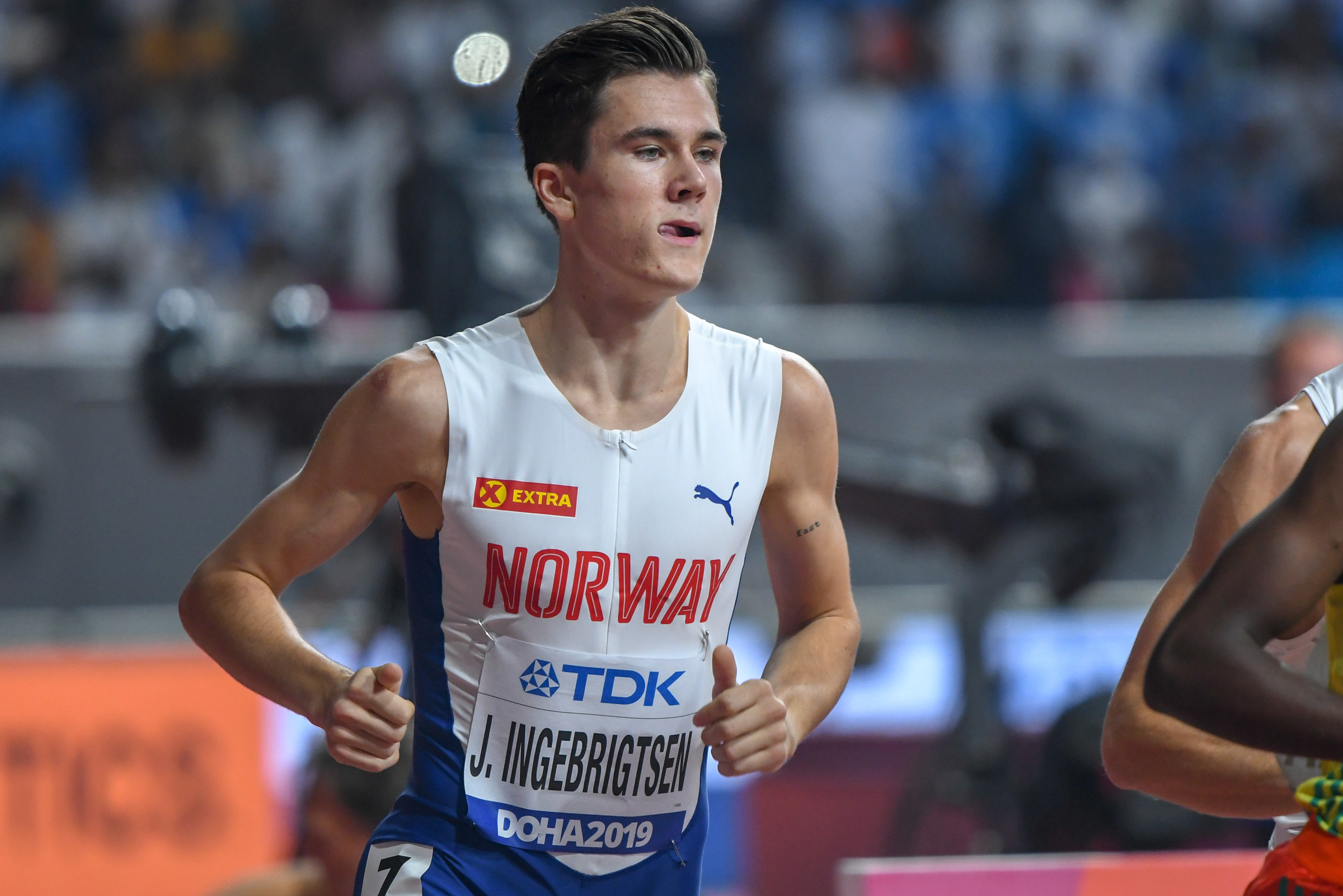
Ingebrigtsen at the 2019 World Athletics Championships held in Doha

On 20 February, at the PSD Bank Meeting in Düsseldorf, Ingebrigtsen set a world under-20 record in the short track 1500 metres, with a time of 3:36.02. At the European Indoor Championships in Glasgow, Ingebrigtsen won the 3000 metres and placed second behind Marcin Lewandowski in the 1500 metres, in times of 7:56.18 and 3:43.23, respectively. On 5 July, Ingebrigtsen set a new personal best in the 1500 metres when he ran 3:30.16 at the Athletissima meeting for second position. On 20 July at the Anniversary Games in London, Ingebrigtsen set a new Norwegian national record and under-20 European record in the 5000 metres with a time of 13:02.03, finishing second. At the World Championships held in Doha, Ingebrigtsen placed fourth in the 1500 metres and fifth in the 5000 metres. On 19 October, Ingebrigtsen broke Sondre Nordstad Moen's Norwegian 10 kilometres national record at the Hytteplanmila in Hole, Norway, winning the race in 27:54. This time was also the fastest time by a European in 2019, and a European under-20 best.

== Senior career ==
=== 2020–2021: 1500 metres European record and Olympic champion ===
On 14 August 2020, at the Herculis meeting in Monaco, Ingebrigtsen broke the 3:30 barrier in the 1500 metres for the first time, running 3:28.68, which was under Mo Farah's 7-year-old European record of 3:28.81. Ingebrigtsen also broke the European record in the short track 1500 metres at the Meeting Hauts-de-France Pas-de-Calais on 9 February 2021, running a time of 3:31.80. At the European Indoor Championships in Toruń, Ingebrigtsen won both the 1500 metres and 3000 metres, becoming the first male athlete to complete the double at the Championships. On 10 June 2021 at the Golden Gala in Florence, Italy, Ingebrigtsen set a new European record in the 5000 metres with his time of 12:48.45, in a race where a half-dozen competitors bested a time of 12:55.

At the delayed 2020 Tokyo Olympics, on 7 August 2021, Ingebrigtsen set an Olympic and European record of 3:28.32 to secure gold in the 1500 metres final. This eclipsed the newly set Olympic record of 3:31.65 established by the Kenyan Abel Kipsang in the Tokyo semifinals, and the previous Olympic record of 3:32.07 set by Noah Ngeny in the 2000 Summer Olympics. Ingebrigtsen became the second youngest winner in this event. On the final bend, he overtook for the first time his Kenyan rival Timothy Cheruiyot, who won the silver medal. On 21 August, Ingebrigtsen set a new personal best and Diamond League record of 3:47.21 in winning the mile at the Prefontaine Classic. At the season-ending Weltklasse Zürich meeting, which served as the 2021 Diamond League final, Ingebrigtsen placed second to Cheruiyot in the 1500 metres, who edged him out over the final sprint.

=== 2022: World indoor 1500 metres record, 5000 metres world champion ===
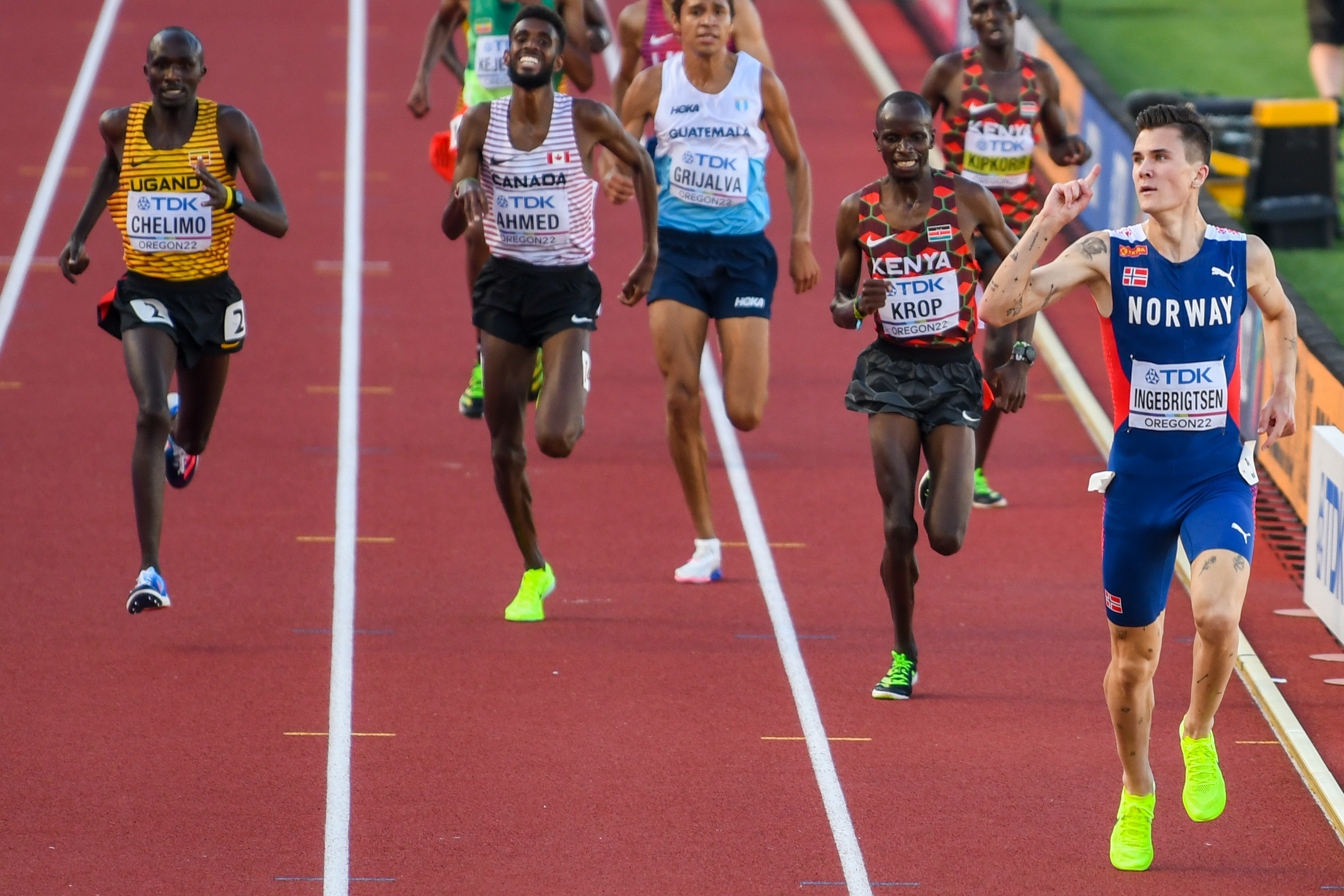
Ingebrigtsen (R) winning the 5000 metres at the 2022 World Athletics Championships in Eugene

On 17 February 2022, Ingebrigtsen set his first senior world record, clocking 3:30.60 for the short track 1500 metres at the Meeting Hauts-de-France Pas-de-Calais in Liévin. He broke Samuel Tefera's 3-year-old record by 0.44 seconds.

About a month later at the 2022 World Indoor Championships held in Belgrade, he was beaten in the event by Tefera, who ran a new championship record of 3:32.77 while Ingebrigtsen placed second in a time of 3:33.02. Ingebrigtsen tested positive for COVID-19 the following day. In June, he improved his own Diamond League and national record in the mile to 3:46.46 in winning at the Bislett Games in Oslo, only missing Steve Cram's European record by 0.14 s.

At the 2022 World Championships in Eugene, Ingebrigtsen achieved a silver medal in the 1500 metres after being outsprinted by Jake Wightman of Great Britain. He also won the gold medal in the 5000 metres, in a time of 13:09.24. In winning, Ingebrigtsen became the first male runner not born in Africa to win an Olympic or World Championships gold in the 5000 metres in 30 years, going back to Dieter Baumann in the 1992 Barcelona Olympics.

In August, Ingebrigtsen won both the 1500 metres and 5000 metres at the 2022 European Championships. In the former event, he set a championship record of 3:32.76, and in the latter event he finished in 13:21.13.

At the season-ending Weltklasse Zürich meeting, which served as the 2022 Diamond League final, he defeated Timothy Cheruiyot in the 1500 metres to take his first Diamond League title. The victory brought his lifetime head-to-head with Cheruiyot to 7–13 at the time.

=== 2023: 2 mile world best, 2000 metres world record ===
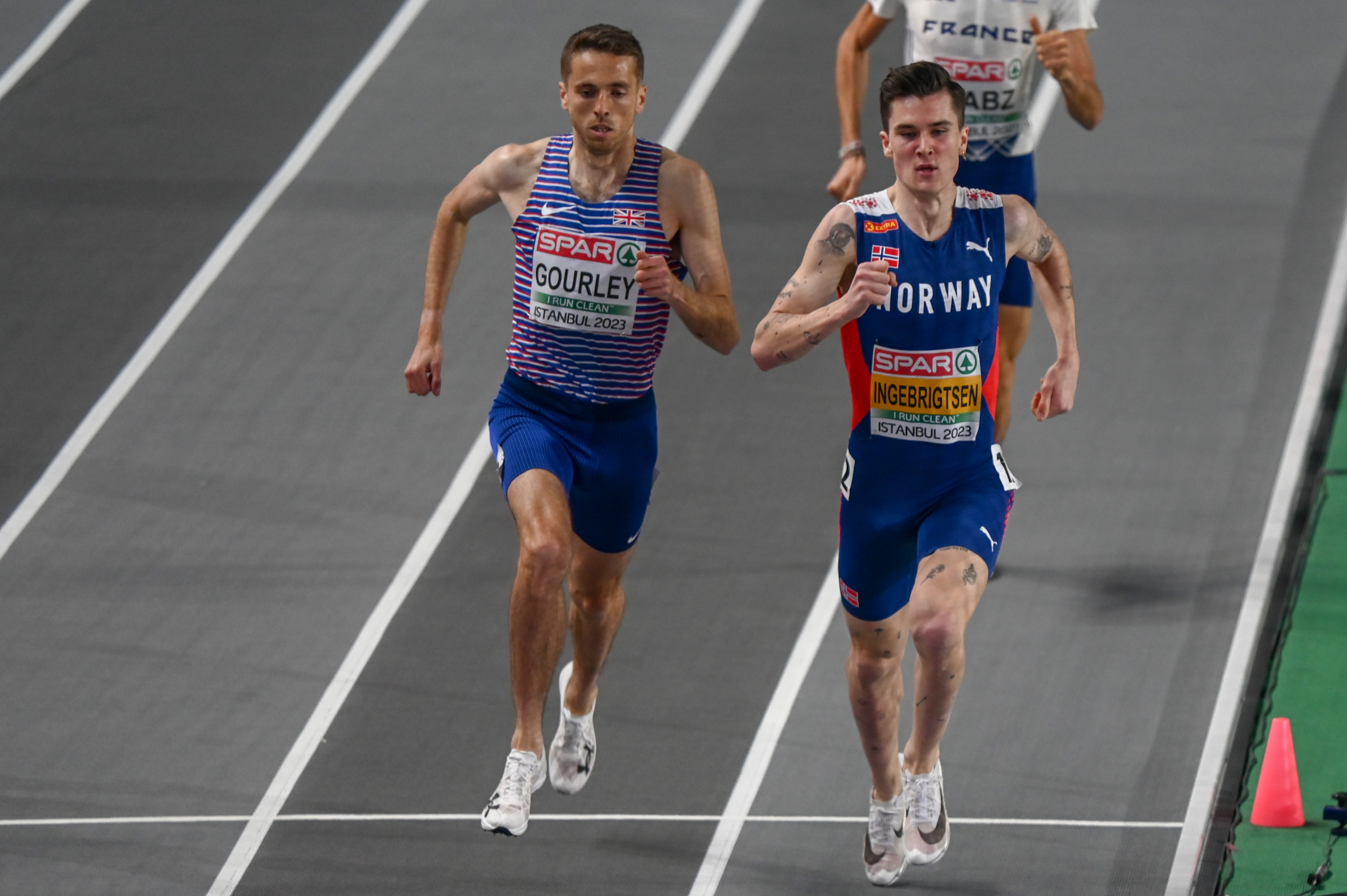
Ingebrigtsen competing against Neil Gourley in the 1500 metres at the 2023 European Indoor Championships in Istanbul

In March at the European Indoor Championships held in Istanbul, Turkey, Ingebrigtsen secured the 1500 / 3000 metres 'double-double', winning both events for the second time. He set a championship record of 3:33.95 at the shorter distance and broke the Norwegian record at the longer event with a time of 7:40.32.

At the Meeting de Paris on 9 June, Ingebrigtsen set the two mile world best by running 7:54.10, improving Daniel Komen's previous world best of 7:58.61, set in 1997, by 4.51 seconds. This made Ingebrigtsen the second man in history, after Komen, to break eight minutes in the two mile and thus average two miles at a sub four minute mile pace.

On 15 June, Ingebrigtsen improved his own European record in the 1500 metres at the Bislett Games, breaking the 3:28 barrier for the first time by running 3:27.95. On 16 July, at the Kamila Skolimowska Memorial, Ingebrigtsen further improved his time to 3:27.14.

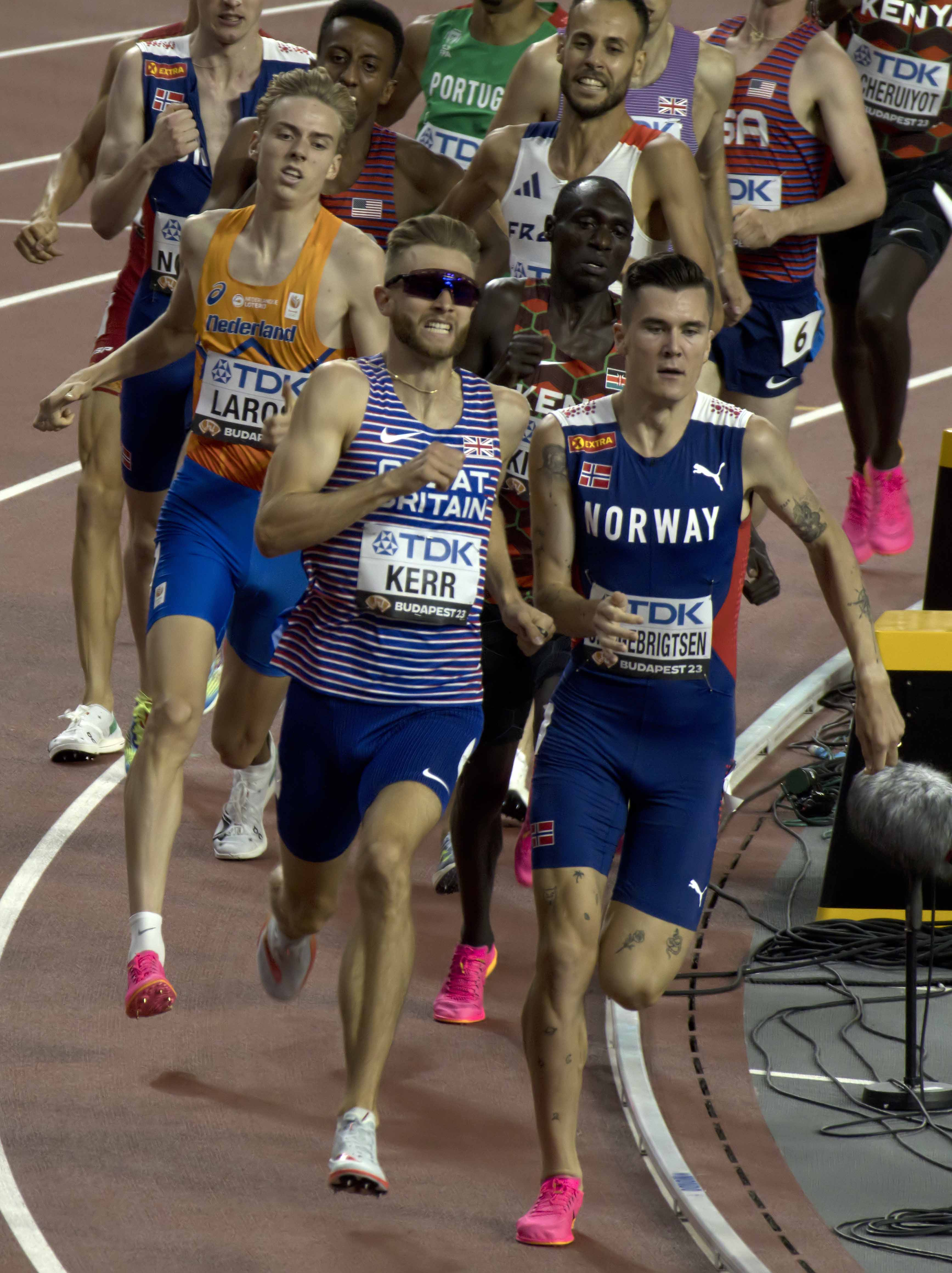
Ingebrigtsen and Josh Kerr in the final curve of the 1500 metres final at the 2023 World Championships in Budapest

For the second successive championships, Ingebrigtsen finished second in the final sprint to a Scottish and British athlete, Josh Kerr, in the 1500 metres final at the 2023 World Athletics Championships in Budapest. He repeated as the gold-medal winner in the 5000 metres. Less than two weeks later, Ingebrigtsen set a new world record in the 2000 metres at the King Baudouin Stadium in Brussels, with a time of 4:43.13, eclipsing Hicham El Guerrouj's previous record of 4:44.79 set in 1999 by 1.66 seconds.

Ingebrigtsen ended his season with victories in the mile and 3000 metres at the Prefontaine Classic, which also served as the 2023 Diamond League final. He edged Yared Nuguse for the win in the mile, winning in 3:43.73 and missing the world record by 0.60 seconds. His time was a new European record and the third-fastest time ever run, behind Noah Ngeny's 3:43.40 and Hicham El Guerrouj's world record of 3:43.13, both ran in 1999. In the 3000 metres, Ingebrigtsen defeated Yomif Kejelcha of Ethiopia, by one hundredth of a second, in a sprint finish. At the time, Ingebrigtsen's clocking of 7:23.63 was the third fastest ever run at the distance, behind El Guerrouj's 1999 time of 7:23.09 and Daniel Komen's world record of 7:20.67, set in 1996.

In fall of 2023, post-track season, Ingebrigtsen suffered an injury around the sacrum region, meaning for the first time in seven years he was unable to defend his continental title at the European Cross Country Championships. According to Ingebrigtsen's spokesperson Espen Skoland, he focused on recovery and training during this time, after a lengthy, challenging 2023 season, to prepare for an important Olympic year in 2024.

=== 2024: 5000 metres Olympic champion, 3000 metres world record ===
Ingebrigtsen skipped his indoor season, including the 2024 World Athletics Indoor Championships in Glasgow, Scotland, due to an achilles injury. Instead, he focused on preparation and training, for both the 2024 European Championships in Rome and the 2024 Summer Olympic Games in Paris, held in June and August, respectively.

Ingebrigtsen's first race of 2024 was on 25 May, at the Prefontaine Classic's Bowerman Mile, against rivals Josh Kerr and Yared Nuguse. With the historically deep field, and the highly anticipated pre-Olympic match-up between Ingebrigtsen and Kerr, who last raced each other at the 2023 World Championships, the 2024 Bowerman Mile was billed as the "Mile Race of the Century". Kerr took the win in 3:45.34, a new British record, while Ingebrigtsen came second in 3:45.60, and Nuguse in third at 3:46.22.

On 30 May, Ingebrigtsen won the 1500 metres at the Bislett Games, in a world leading time of 3:29.74, edging out Timothy Cheruiyot by three hundredths of a second. In June, he won the 1500 metres at the European Athletics Championships, with a new championship record of 3:31.95, and the 5000 metres in a time of 13:20.11. On 12 July, in the final weeks before the 2024 Summer Olympics, Ingebrigtsen improved his European record in the 1500 metres to 3:26.73 at Monaco's Herculis meeting, becoming the fourth man in history to break the 3:27 barrier.

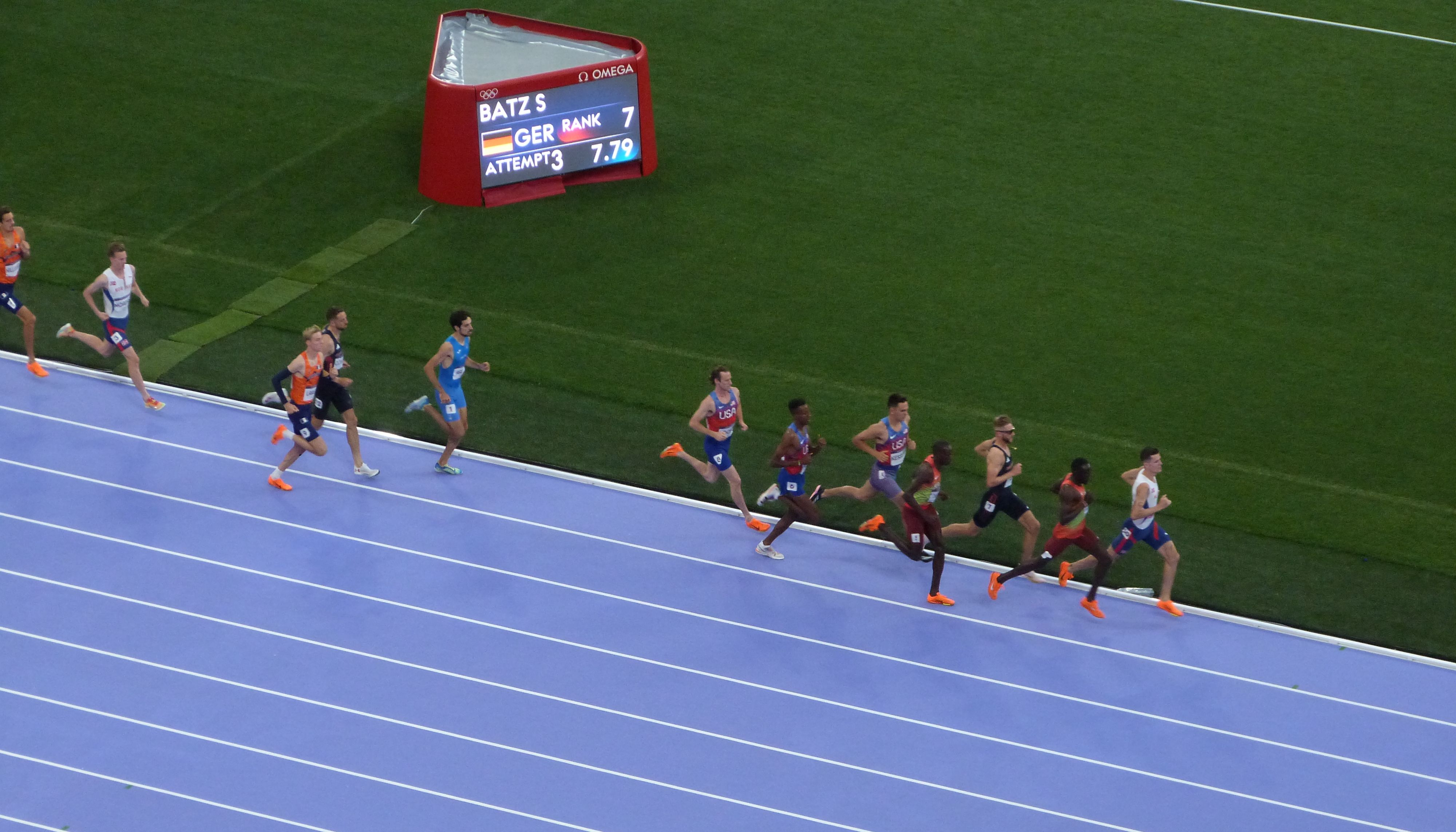
Ingebrigtsen leading the 1500 metres final at the 2024 Summer Olympics in Paris

On 6 August, in the Olympic men's 1500 metres final, Ingebrigtsen led at a fast pace for most of the race, but unexpectedly faded to fourth in a time of 3:28.24, with Yared Nuguse, Josh Kerr, and Cole Hocker passing him in the final straightaway. The race was highly anticipated given Ingebrigtsen's rivalry with Kerr, with World Athletics President and former middle-distance runner Sebastian Coe labeling it a "Race for the Ages". The top four finishers all finished under Ingebrigtsen's previous Olympic record of 3:28.32, with Hocker winning the gold medal in a new Olympic record of 3:27.65. Despite the loss, Ingebrigtsen would go on to win the Olympic men's 5000 metres final on 10 August, in a time of 13:13.66. This race saw a relatively slow start, but turned into a sprint finish, with the final lap being 53.2 seconds. With his Tokyo 2020 gold medal in the 1500 metres, and his Paris 2024 gold medal in the 5000 metres, Ingebrigtsen became the third man in history to have achieved an Olympic gold medal in both the 1500 metres and 5000 metres. The other two men, Hicham El Guerrouj and Paavo Nurmi, achieved this feat at the same Olympic Games, in Athens 2004 and Paris 1924 respectively.

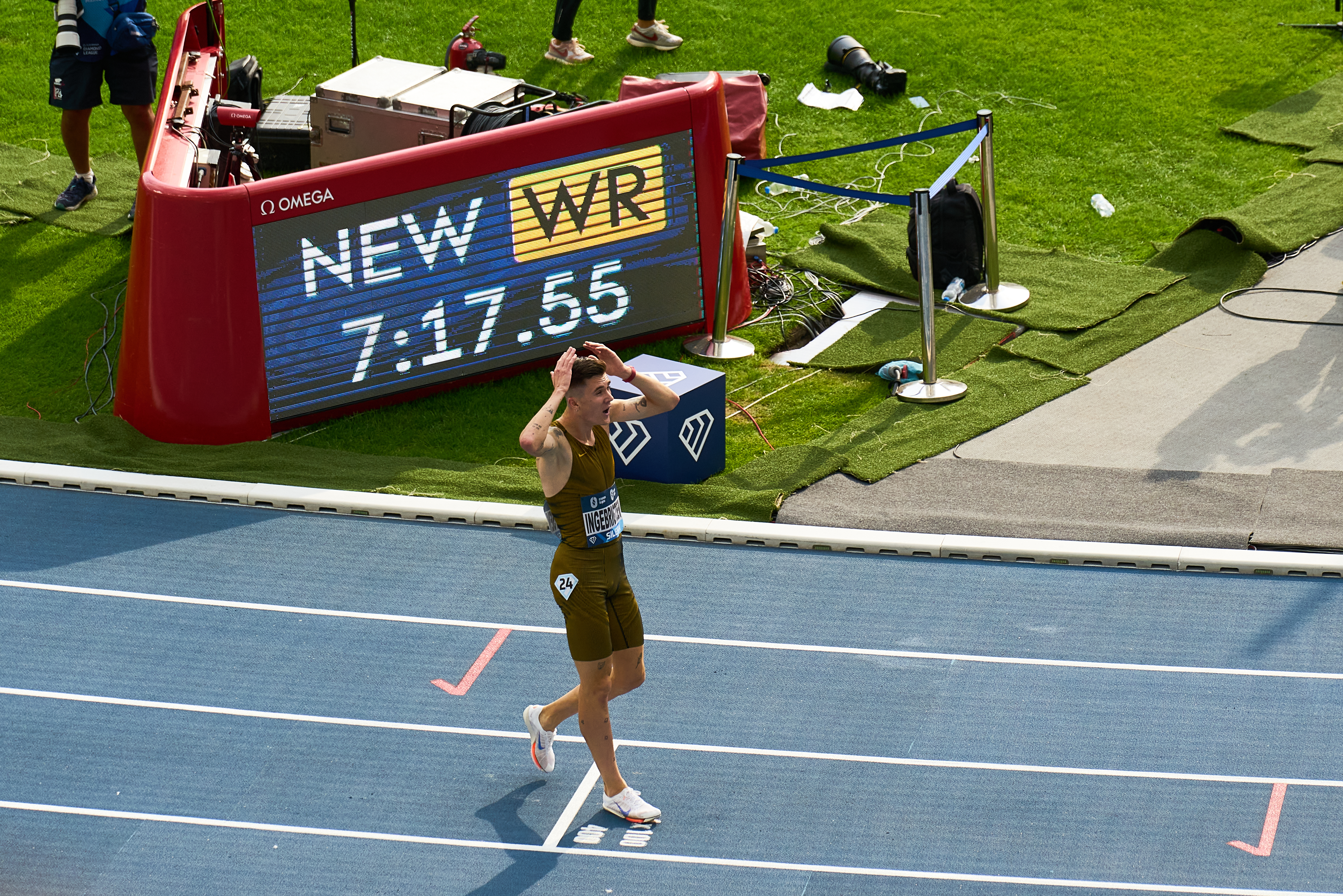
Ingebrigtsen after breaking Daniel Komen's 3000 metres world record in Silesia

On 22 August, at the Athletissima meeting, Ingebrigtsen defeated Olympic champion Cole Hocker in the 1500 metres, setting a new meeting record of 3:27.83 to Hocker's 3:29.85. On 25 August, Ingebrigtsen set a new 3000 metres world record at the Kamila Skolimowska Memorial, finishing in 7:17.55 to break the previous mark of 7:20.67 set by Kenya's Daniel Komen in 1996. Komen's nearly 28-year-old record had been the longest-standing men's athletics world record in an individual track event. In breaking the record, Ingebrigtsen became the first man to break the 7:20 barrier at this distance, averaging 58.34 seconds per 400 m with a final lap of 55.45 seconds. Ingebrigtsen's 3000 metres performance, with a world athletics score of 1320 points, ranks as the second-highest men's outdoor distance world record in athletics, only behind Kelvin Kiptum's marathon world record of 2:00:35 which scores 1322 points. In a tweet on 25 August, Bernard Lagat considered Komen's world record to be the "hardest" to break, and that Ingebrigtsen's new world record was "wild".

On 5 September, Ingebrigtsen was defeated by Yared Nuguse in the 1500 metres at the Weltklasse Zürich meeting, with Nuguse winning in 3:29.21 and Ingebrigtsen finishing second in 3:29.52. Ingebrigtsen had reported being sick after setting his world record in the 3000 metres. In addition to Nuguse and Ingebrigtsen, the race featured the other two Olympic medalists, Cole Hocker and Josh Kerr, who finished third and fifth respectively. As such, this race was billed as an "Olympic rematch" and the "metric mile of the century". The race was Ingebrigtsen's first 1500 metres Diamond League defeat in three years. On 13 September, at the Memorial Van Damme in Brussels, which served as the 2024 Diamond League final, Ingebrigtsen ended his track season with a Diamond League title in the 1500 metres, winning in a time of 3:30.37. At the finish line of the race was world record holder Hicham El Guerrouj, who congratulated Ingebrigtsen.

On 15 September, Ingebrigtsen competed at the Copenhagen Half Marathon, his debut at the distance. At 10 kilometres, he split 27:27, which was a personal best for Ingebrigtsen and a new Norwegian national record. Ingebrigtsen briefly stopped at the 10 kilometres mark, but still continued to finish the half marathon in a time of 1:03:13, which was 34th overall in the elite race. Ingebrigtsen ended his 2024 season by winning the senior race at the European Cross Country Championships in Antalya, his third win in the event.

=== 2025: Indoor 1500 metres and mile world records, world indoor double ===
In his first race of the year on 13 February, Ingebrigtsen broke Yared Nuguse's world record in the short track mile, running 3:45.14 at the Meeting Hauts-de-France Pas-de-Calais in Liévin. Ingebrigtsen split 3:29.63 for 1500 metres en route to the mile, thus breaking his previous short track world record of 3:30.60 in this event by almost a second and becoming the first man to ever run sub-3:30 in the short track 1500 metres.

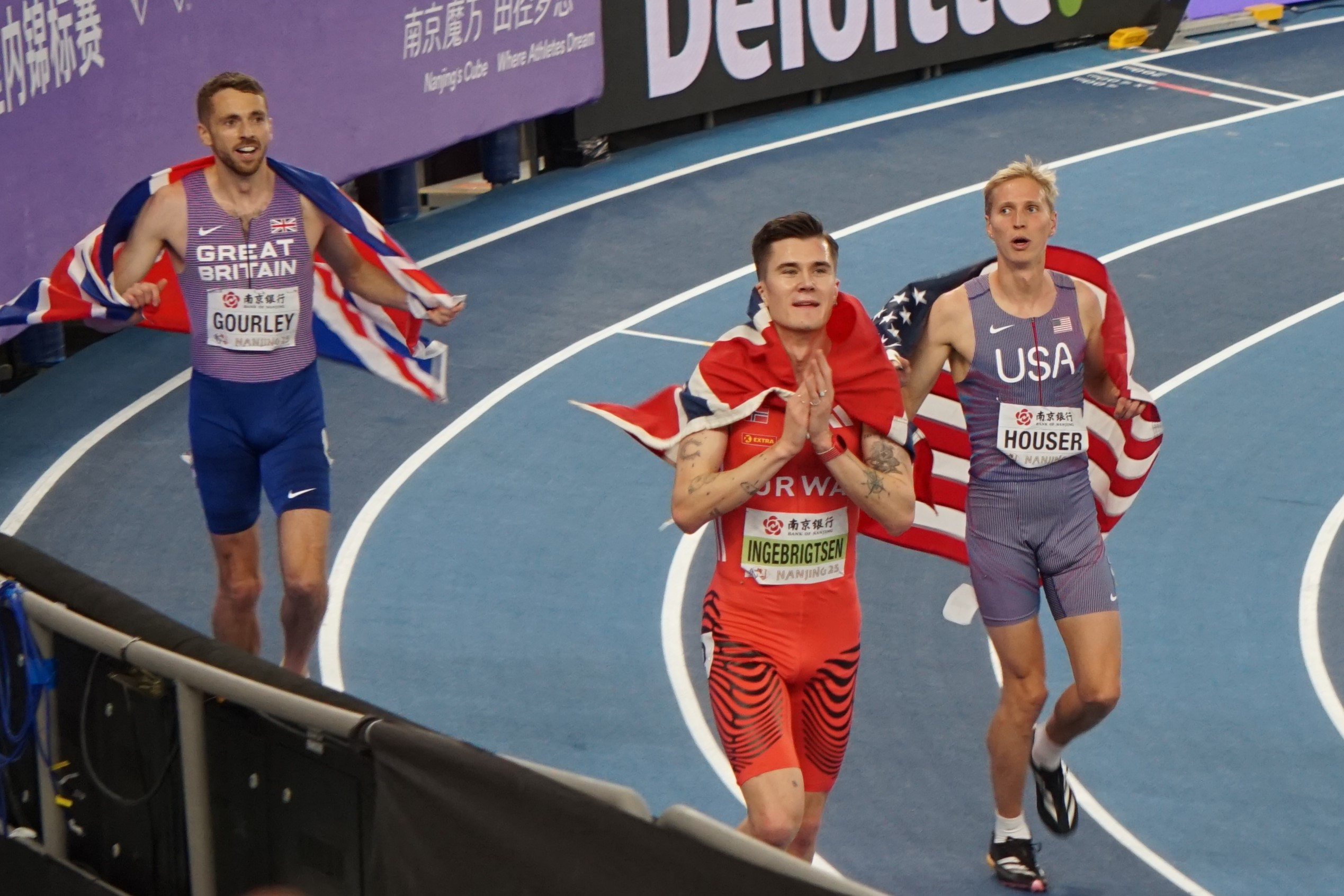
Ingebrigtsen alongside medalists Neil Gourley and Luke Houser after winning the 1500 metres at the 2025 World Athletics Indoor Championships in Nanjing

At the 2025 European Athletics Indoor Championships in Apeldoorn, Ingebrigtsen won the 1500 metres and the 3000 metres races, completing the distance double for the third time (alongside 2021 and 2023).

On 22 March, at the 2025 World Athletics Indoor Championships in Nanjing, China, Ingebrigtsen achieved his first world indoor title, winning the 3000 metres over Berihu Aregawi in a time of 7:46.09 to Aregawi's 7:46.25. The following day, Ingebrigtsen won the 1500 metres in a time of 3:38.79, becoming the second man after Haile Gebrselassie to win two gold medals at the same World Indoor Championships. Ingebrigtsen's performance made him the sixth male distance runner to win a gold medal at the Olympic Games, World Outdoor Championships, and World Indoor Championships.

In May, Ingebrigtsen announced that he had suffered a strained Achilles tendon, causing him to postpone an altitude training camp. The injury resulted in him not racing the 2025 Diamond League. Ingebrigtsen failed to advance from the first round of the men's 1500 m at the 2025 World Championships in Tokyo, Japan. He finished tenth in the men's 5000 m final.

In October, Ingebrigtsen had his tonsils removed due to recurring illness cycles, which included sicknesses at the 2022 World Indoor Championships, 2023 World Championships, and the 2024 Weltklasse Zürich meeting. The surgery required him to take two weeks off training.

=== 2026: Achilles surgery, 5000 metres European champion ===
In February, Ingebrigtsen revealed he had undergone surgery on his Achilles after a flare-up in January. On 10 August, in his first race back after the operation, he won the 5000 metres at the European Championships in Birmingham, England, his fourth-straight title at the event.

== Personal life ==
=== Marriage and family ===
On 23 September 2023, Ingebrigtsen married Elisabeth Asserson. They had been dating for seven years, since they were both 16. Their daughter was born in June 2024.

=== Abuse allegations against Gjert Ingebrigtsen ===
In October 2023, Jakob, Filip, and Henrik Ingebrigtsen released a statement accusing their father and former coach Gjert of "aggression, control, and physical violence", also saying that he "took the joy out of the sport they once loved". Gjert coached the three brothers until 2022. Jakob accused his father specifically of slapping him twice in 2008, and threatening to beat him "to death". Gjert, via his lawyer, stated that the allegations were "baseless" and that he was never violent. During an interview in 2019, years before the Ingebrigtsen brothers publicised their allegations, Gjert stated he felt it was necessary to control every aspect of his sons' lives to maximise their athletic performance, explaining "you have to be a dictator."

In 2024, Gjert was charged with seven counts of domestic abuse under Norwegian law. The charges included accusations of abuse to Jakob and his younger siblings. Six other charges were dismissed for lack of evidence or statute of limitations.

The trial began in March 2025, and lasted six weeks. Over 40 witnesses were called, including all seven Ingebrigtsen siblings. Speaking in court, Jakob stated "My upbringing was very much characterised by fear ... Everything was controlled and decided for me." On 16 June, Gjert was convicted of assaulting his daughter Ingrid, but acquitted of all charges of abuse against Jakob due to lack of evidence. Gjert was sentenced to a 15-day suspended prison sentence and ordered to pay NOK 10,000 ($1,010) in damages.

=== Athletic goals and interests ===
Ingebrigtsen has stated he would like to break every record from the 1500 metres up to the marathon. Thus far, Ingebrigtsen has broken the short track 1500 metres, short track mile, 2000 metres and 3000 metres world records, along with the two mile world best.

Ingebrigtsen considers running "the ultimate sport", and enjoys that it is "so basic, brutal, in the way that it is man against man, woman against woman. If you are first to finish, you have won. You don't need to ask anyone who is the best."

In June 2025, the Ingebrigtsen brothers, along with Karoline Bjerkeli Grovdal and Marthe Kristoffersen, launched the Spring Run Club, open to all individuals interested in learning more about running. Ingebrigtsen said the team wants "...to share our knowledge and help grow a global running movement, for everyone that loves running". As of 2025, other noted members of the club include Wilma Torbiörnsson, Marte Hovland, Malin Hoelsveen, Magnus Tuv Myhre, and Andreas Fjeld Halvorsen.

=== Media appearances ===
From 2016 to 2021, Ingebrigtsen starred in a Norwegian reality show called Team Ingebrigtsen, which revolved around him and his brothers, showing the trials and tribulations of middle-distance running. The concept for the show was inspired years earlier, when Ingebrigtsen appeared as a ten year old on a Norwegian show that profiled young athletes. The New York Times described the show as "relentlessly authentic", and it became so popular in Norway that Ingebrigtsen has stated he has trouble going outside in his home country without being recognised.

In September 2024, Amazon Prime released the first season of Ingebrigtsen: Born to Run, a six-episode documentary series. It stars Jakob, as well as his brothers Henrik and Filip, in the lead up to the 2024 Summer Olympics. Gjert was not featured in the series. The Irish Times called the show "part family reality show, part training manual, part travelogue", and considered the "family side" of the show to be "compelling viewing", since it shows "how the once closely-knit and seemingly idyllic Ingebrigtsen family unit is now broken beyond repair".

In late July 2024, Jakob, Filip, and Henrik Ingebrigtsen released a pop song titled "Ingen gjør det bedre" (Nobody Does It Better) under the handle The IngebritZ, aiming to build excitement in Norway ahead of the 2024 Summer Olympics.

== Achievements ==
=== Personal bests ===
All information from World Athletics profile.

Personal best performances
Category	Event	Time	Venue	Date	Notes
Outdoor	800 m	1:46.44	Boysen Memorial; Oslo, Norway	30 June 2020	
Outdoor	1500 m	3:26.73	Monaco Diamond League, Monaco	12 July 2024	European record, 4th all time
Outdoor	Mile	3:43.73	Prefontaine Classic; Eugene, United States	16 September 2023	National record, 4th all time
Outdoor	2000 m	4:43.13	Memorial van Damme; Brussels, Belgium	8 September 2023	World record
Outdoor	3000 m	7:17.55	Kamila Skolimowska Memorial; Chorzów, Poland	25 August 2024	World record
Outdoor	3000 m s'chase	8:26.81	Guldensporenmeeting; Kortrijk, Belgium	8 July 2017	NU18B, NU20R
Outdoor	Two miles	7:54.10	Meeting de Paris; Paris, France	9 June 2023	World best
Outdoor	5000 m	12:48.45	Golden Gala; Florence, Italy	10 June 2021	National record
Indoor	800 m	1:52.01	Norwegian Indoor Championships; Bærum, Norway	4 February 2018	
Indoor	1500 m	3:29.63+	Meeting Hauts-de-France Pas-de-Calais; Liévin, France	13 February 2025	World record
Indoor	Mile	3:45.14	Meeting Hauts-de-France Pas-de-Calais; Liévin, France	13 February 2025	World record
Indoor	3000 m	7:40.32	European Indoor Championships; Istanbul, Turkey	5 March 2023	NR
Road	10 km	27:27+	Copenhagen, Denmark	15 September 2024	NR, en route to half marathon
Road	Half marathon	1:03:13	Copenhagen, Denmark	15 September 2024	

=== Progression ===
Each event combines outdoor and short track variations. An ongoing year is not included. Only primary events and events run in multiple years included. All information from World Athletics profile.

Personal best

==== 1500 metres ====
Year	Time	Venue	Date
2014	4:05.49	Sandnes, Norway	20 September
2015	3:48.37	Stockholm, Sweden	30 July
2016	3:42.44	Oslo, Norway	9 June
2017	3:39.92	Stockholm, Sweden	18 June
2018	3:31.18	Fontvieille, Monaco	20 July
2019	3:30.16	Lausanne, Switzerland	5 July
2020	3:28.68	Fontvieille, Monaco	14 August
2021	3:28.32	Tokyo, Japan	7 August
2022	3:29.02	Zurich, Switzerland	8 September
2023	3:27.14	Chorzów, Poland	16 July
2024	3:26.73	Fontvieille, Monaco	12 July
2025	3:29.63i+	Liévin, France	13 February

==== Mile ====
Year	Time	Venue	Date
2017	3:56.29	Stockholm, Sweden	15 June
2018	3:52.28	Eugene, United States	26 May
2019	3:51.30	Palo Alto, United States	30 June
2021	3:47.24	Eugene, United States	21 August
2022	3:46.46	Oslo, Norway	16 June
2023	3:43.73	Eugene, United States	16 September
2024	3:45.60	Eugene, United States	25 May
2025	3:45.14i	Liévin, France	13 February

==== 2000 metres ====
Year	Time	Venue	Date
2014	5:42.07	Oslo, Norway	17 August
2015	5:24.41	Lillestrøm, Norway	13 September
2020	4:50.01	Oslo, Norway	11 June
2023	4:43.13	Brussels, Belgium	8 September

==== 3000 metres ====
Year	Time	Venue	Date
2015	8:25.90	Bærum, Norway	12 June
2016	8:22.25	Nadderud, Norway	10 June
2017	8:00.01	Bergen, Norway	1 September
2018	7:56.74i	Bærum, Norway	4 February
2019	7:51.20i	Glasgow, United Kingdom	1 March
2020	7:27.05	Rome, Italy	17 September
2021	7:33.06	Lausanne, Switzerland	26 August
2023	7:23.63	Eugene, United States	17 September
2024	7:17.55	Chorzów, Poland	25 August
2025	7:46.09i	Nanjing, China	22 March

==== 5000 metres ====
Year	Time	Venue	Date
2016	14:38.67	Brandbu, Norway	7 August
2017	13:35.84	Sandnes, Norway	25 August
2018	13:17.06	Berlin, Germany	11 August
2019	13:02.03	London, United Kingdom	20 July
2021	12:48.45	Florence, Italy	10 June
2022	13:02.03	San Juan Capistrano, United States	6 May
2023	13:11.30	Budapest, Hungary	27 August
2024	13:13.66	Paris, France	10 August
2025	13:02.00	Tokyo, Japan	21 September

=== International competitions ===
Achievements in international competitions representing Norway
Year	Competition	Venue	Position	Event	Time	Ref
2016	World U20 Championships	Bydgoszcz, Poland	9th	1500 m	3:51.09	
2016	European Cross Country Junior Championships	Chia, Italy	1st	XC 6 km U20	17:06	
2017	European U20 Championships	Grosseto, Italy	8th	1500 m	3:58.64	
2017	European U20 Championships	Grosseto, Italy	1st	5000 m	14:41.67	
2017	European U20 Championships	Grosseto, Italy	1st	3000 m s'chase	8:50.00	
2017	World Championships	London, United Kingdom	27th (sf)	3000 m s'chase	8:34.88	
2017	European Cross Country Junior Championships	Šamorín, Slovakia	1st	XC 6.28 km U20	18:39	
2018	World U20 Championships	Tampere, Finland	2nd	1500 m	3:41.89	
2018	World U20 Championships	Tampere, Finland	3rd	5000 m	13:20.78 AU20R	
2018	European Championships	Berlin, Germany	1st	1500 m	3:38.10	
2018	European Championships	Berlin, Germany	1st	5000 m	13:17.06 AU20R	
2018	European Cross Country Junior Championships	Tilburg, Netherlands	1st	XC 6.3 km U20	18:00	
2019	European Indoor Championships	Glasgow, United Kingdom	2nd	1500 m	3:43.23	
2019	European Indoor Championships	Glasgow, United Kingdom	1st	3000 m	7:56.15	
2019	World Cross Country Championships	Aarhus, Denmark	12th	XC 7.728 km U20	24:39	
2019	World Championships	Doha, Qatar	4th	1500 m	3:31.70	
2019	World Championships	Doha, Qatar	5th	5000 m	13:02.93	
2019	European Cross Country Junior Championships	Lisbon, Portugal	1st	XC 6.3 km U20	18:20	
2021	European Indoor Championships	Toruń, Poland	1st	1500 m	3:37.56	
2021	European Indoor Championships	Toruń, Poland	1st	3000 m	7:48.20 PB	
2021	Olympic Games	Tokyo, Japan	1st	1500 m	3:28.32 OR AR	
2021	European Cross Country Championships	Dublin, Ireland	1st	XC 10 km	30:15	
2022	World Indoor Championships	Belgrade, Serbia	2nd	1500 m	3:33.02	
2022	World Championships	Eugene, United States	2nd	1500 m	3:29.47	
2022	World Championships	Eugene, United States	1st	5000 m	13:09.24	
2022	European Championships	Munich, Germany	1st	1500 m	3:32.76 CR	
2022	European Championships	Munich, Germany	1st	5000 m	13:21.13	
2022	European Cross Country Championships	Turin, Italy	1st	XC 9.572 km	29:33	
2023	European Indoor Championships	Istanbul, Turkey	1st	1500 m	3:33.95 CR	
2023	European Indoor Championships	Istanbul, Turkey	1st	3000 m	7:40.32 NR	
2023	World Championships	Budapest, Hungary	2nd	1500 m	3:29.65	
2023	World Championships	Budapest, Hungary	1st	5000 m	13:11.30	
2024	European Championships	Rome, Italy	1st	1500 m	3:31.95 CR	
2024	European Championships	Rome, Italy	1st	5000 m	13:20.11	
2024	Olympic Games	Paris, France	4th	1500 m	3:28.24	
2024	Olympic Games	Paris, France	1st	5000 m	13:13.66	
2024	European Cross Country Championships	Antalya, Turkey	1st	XC 7.5 km	22:16	
2025	European Indoor Championships	Apeldoorn, Netherlands	1st	1500 m	3:36.56	
2025	European Indoor Championships	Apeldoorn, Netherlands	1st	3000 m	7:48.37	
2025	World Indoor Championships	Nanjing, China	1st	3000 m	7:46.09	
2025	World Indoor Championships	Nanjing, China	1st	1500 m	3:38.79	
2025	World Championships	Tokyo, Japan	8th (prelim)	1500 m	3:37.84	
2025	World Championships	Tokyo, Japan	10th	5000 m	13:02.00	
2026	European Championships	Birmingham, United Kingdom	1st	5000 m	13:15.29	
2026	World Ultimate Championship	Budapest, Hungary	1st	5000 m	12:59.24	

Achievements in international competitions representing Europe
Year	Competition	Venue	Position	Event	Time	Ref
2018	Continental Cup	Ostrava, Czech Republic	3rd	1500 m	3:40.80	

=== Circuit wins and titles ===
==== Diamond League ====
Year	Competition	Venue	Position	Event	Time	Ref
Representing Nike
2020	Memorial Van Damme	Brussels, Belgium	1st	1500 m	3:30.69	
2021	British Grand Prix	Birmingham, United Kingdom	1st	1500 m	3:36.27	
2021	Golden Gala	Florence, Italy	1st	5000 m	12:48.45 WL AR	
2021	Prefontaine Classic	Eugene, United States	1st	Mile	3:47.24 WL	
2021	Athletissima	Lausanne, Switzerland	1st	3000 m	7:33.06	
2022	Prefontaine Classic	Eugene, United States	1st	Mile	3:49.76 WL	
2022	Bislett Games	Oslo, Norway	1st	Mile	3:46.46 WL DLR NR	
2022	Athletissima	Lausanne, Switzerland	1st	1500 m	3:29.05 WL	
2022	Weltklasse Zürich	Zurich, Switzerland	1st	1500 m	3:29.02 WL	
2023	Meeting International Mohammed VI d'Athlétisme de Rabat	Rabat, Morocco	1st	1500 m	3:32.59	
2023	Meeting de Paris	Paris, France	1st	Two miles (Note: Not a diamond discipline event)	7:54.10 WB	
2023	Bislett Games	Oslo, Norway	1st	1500 m	3:27.95 AR MR WL	
2023	Athletissima	Lausanne, Switzerland	1st	1500 m	3:28.72 MR	
2023	Kamila Skolimowska Memorial	Chorzów, Poland	1st	1500 m	3:27.14 AR MR WL	
2023	Memorial Van Damme	Brussels, Belgium	1st	2000 m	4:43.13 WR MR DLR	
2023	Prefontaine Classic	Eugene, United States	1st	Mile	3:43.73 AR DLR MR WL	
2023	Prefontaine Classic	Eugene, United States	1st	3000 m	7:23.63 AR DLR MR WL	
2024	Bislett Games	Oslo, Norway	1st	1500 m	3:29.74 WL	
2024	Herculis	Fontvieille, Monaco	1st	1500 m	3:26.73 AR WL	
2024	Athletissima	Lausanne, Switzerland	1st	1500 m	3:27.83 MR	
2024	Kamila Skolimowska Memorial	Chorzów, Poland	1st	3000 m	7:17.55 WR MR DLR	
2024	Memorial Van Damme	Brussels, Belgium	1st	1500 m	3:30.37	

==== World Indoor Tour Gold ====
Year	Competition	Venue	Position	Event	Time	Ref
Representing Nike
2019	PSD Bank Meeting	Düsseldorf, Germany	1st	1500 m	3:36.02 WU20R	
2021	Meeting Hauts-de-France Pas-de-Calais	Liévin, France	1st	1500 m	3:31.80 AR	
2022	Meeting Hauts-de-France Pas-de-Calais	Liévin, France	1st	1500 m	3:30.60 WR	
2023	Meeting Hauts-de-France Pas-de-Calais	Liévin, France	1st	1500 m	3:32.38 WL	
2025	Meeting Hauts-de-France Pas-de-Calais	Liévin, France	1st	1500 m	3:29.63+ WR	
2025	Meeting Hauts-de-France Pas-de-Calais	Liévin, France	1st	Mile	3:45.14 WR	

=== National championships ===
Achievements in national championships
Year	Competition	Venue	Position	Event	Time	Ref
2015	Norwegian Championships	Haugesund	9th	1500 m	3:54.05	
2015	Norwegian Youth Championships	Lillestrøm	1st	800 m	1:54.05	
2015	Norwegian Youth Championships	Lillestrøm	1st	2000 m	5:24.41	
2016	Norwegian Championships	Askøy	5th	800 m	1:53.10	
2016	Norwegian Championships	Askøy	3rd	1500 m	4:01.67	
2016	Norwegian Junior Championships	Brandbu	2nd	800 m	1:54.13	
2016	Norwegian Junior Championships	Brandbu	1st	1500 m	3:46.59	
2016	Norwegian Junior Championships	Brandbu	1st	5000 m	14:38.67	
2016	Norwegian Youth Championships	Sandnes	1st	800 m	1:56.03	
2016	Norwegian Youth Championships	Sandnes	1st	3000 m	8:36.77	
2017	Norwegian Championships	Sandnes	3rd	800 m	1:50.54	
2017	Norwegian Championships	Sandnes	1st	1500 m	3:53.29	
2017	Norwegian Championships	Sandnes	1st	5000 m	13:35.84	
2017	Norwegian Championships	Sandnes	1st	3000 m s'chase	8:44.12	
2017	Norwegian Youth Championships	Bergen	2nd	400 m	51.03	
2017	Norwegian Youth Championships	Bergen	1st	3000 m	8:00.01	
2017	Norwegian Indoor Youth Championships	Oslo	1st	800 m	1:52.91	
2017	Norwegian Indoor Youth Championships	Oslo	1st	1500 m	3:51.91	
2018	Norwegian Championships	Byrkjelo	1st	1500 m	4:03.54	
2018	Norwegian Indoor Championships	Bærum	2nd	800 m	1:52.01	
2018	Norwegian Indoor Championships	Bærum	1st	1500 m	3:42.75	
2018	Norwegian Indoor Championships	Bærum	1st	3000 m	7:56.74	
2019	Norwegian Championships	Hamar	1st	1500 m	3:36.33	
2020	Norwegian Championships	Bergen	1st	800 m	1:48.72	
2020	Norwegian Championships	Bergen	1st	1500 m	3:33.93	
2021	Norwegian Championships	Kristiansand	1st	1500 m	3:33.26	
2024	Norwegian Championships	Sandnes	1st	1500 m	3:34.03	
2024	Norwegian Championships	Sandnes	1st	5000 m	13:14.36	

=== Honours and awards ===
Venue	Award	Year	Status	Ref
Norwegian Association of Sports Journalists	Norwegian Sportsperson of the Year	2018	Won	
Norwegian Association of Sports Journalists	Norwegian Sportsperson of the Year	2022	Won	
Idrettsgalla	Athletes' Award	2019	Won	
Idrettsgalla	Athletes' Award	[?]	Won	
Idrettsgalla	Athletes' Award	2025	Won	
Laureus World Sports Awards	Breakthrough of the Year	2019	Nominated	
Laureus World Sports Awards	Comeback of the Year	2023	Nominated	
European Athletics	Rising Star of the Year	2018	Won (Note: Joint award with Armand Duplantis.)	
European Athletics	European Athlete of the Year	2022	Won (Note: Joint award with Armand Duplantis.)	
European Athletics	European Athlete of the Year	2023	Won	
World Athletics	Athlete of the Year	2021	Nominated	
World Athletics	Athlete of the Year	2022	Nominated	
World Athletics	Athlete of the Year	2023	Nominated	
World Athletics	Athlete of the Year	2024	Nominated	

== Notes ==
Records
Preceded by (United Kingdom) Mo Farah	Men's 1500 m European record holder 14 August 2020 –	Succeeded by Incumbent
Preceded by (Belgium) Mohammed Mourhit	Men's 5000 m European record holder 10 June 2021 –	Succeeded by Incumbent
Preceded by (United Kingdom) Steve Cram	Men's mile European record holder 16 September 2023 –	Succeeded by Incumbent
Preceded by (Ethiopia) Samuel Tefera	Men's 1500 m short track world record holder 17 February 2022 –	Succeeded by Incumbent
Preceded by (Kenya) Daniel Komen	Men's two mile world best holder 9 June 2023 –	Succeeded by Incumbent
Preceded by (Morocco) Hicham El Guerrouj	Men's 2000 m world record holder 8 September 2023 –	Succeeded by Incumbent
Preceded by (Kenya) Daniel Komen	Men's 3000 m world record holder 25 August 2024 –	Succeeded by Incumbent
Preceded by (United States) Yared Nuguse	Men's mile short track world record holder 13 February 2025 –	Succeeded by Incumbent
