= Andrew Coscoran =

Irish middle-distance runner

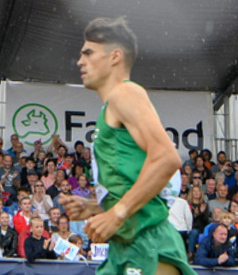

Personal information
- Nationality: Irish
- Born: 18 June 1996 (age 30) Dublin, Ireland
- Home town: Balbriggan
- Education: Saint Mary's Diocesan High School

Sport
- Country: Ireland
- Sport: Athletics
- Event: 1500 metres
- Club: SOS
- Coached by: Feidhlim Kelly

Achievements and titles
- Personal bests: 800 m: 1:46.61 (Lignano Sabbiadoro, 2021); 1500 m: 3:30.42 (Silesia, 2023) NR; Mile: 3:50.49 (London 2024); 10,000 m: 27:56.37 (Melbourne, 2023); Indoors; 1500 m: 3:33.09 (Liévin, 2026) NR; Mile: 3:49.26 (New York, 2025) NR; 3000 m: 7:30.75 (Boston, 2025) NR; 5000 m 13:12.56 (Boston, 2024)NR
Medal record
Representing Ireland
European Championships
Bronze medal – third place	2026 Birmingham	1500 m

Andrew Coscoran (born 18 June 1996) is an Irish athlete who specializes in middle distance running. He was the bronze medalist at the 2026 European Athletics Championships in the men's 1500 metres.

In 2022, he became the Irish national record holder over the 1500 metres, and went on to set Irish national records indoors in the 1500 metres, mile run, 3000 metres and 5000 metres. He has represented Ireland at multiple major championships, including the 2020 and 2024 Olympic Games.

== Early life ==
Coscoran is from Balbriggan and attended Saint Mary's Diocesan School in Drogheda. He won the Irish Schools track and field Senior Boys 1,500m title in 2014, while competing for St. Mary's DS, which was his first national breakthrough in Athletics. He joined Star of the Sea AC in 2010 as a teenager and quickly developed a passion for middle distance running. Aged 18 years old he was awarded an athletic scholarship to attend Florida State University. Coscoran returned, however, to Ireland to study at Dublin City University and has had marked success with Dublin Track Club and coach Feidhlim Kelly.

== Career ==
Coscoran won the 2020 Irish Indoor Championships in the 1500 metres. In 2021, he took the national outdoor title, and ran new personal bests throughout the year. He was selected for the Irish team at the delayed 2020 Tokyo Summer Olympics. Coscoran progressed to the semi-finals of the men's 1500 m in Tokyo, where he placed 10th in his race with a time of 3:35.84.

In August 2022, Coscoran qualified for the final of the 1500 m event at the 2022 European Athletics Championships held in Munich, Germany, where he finished ninth.

=== 2023 ===
On 25 February 2023, the 26-year-old broke Marcus O'Sullivan's 35-year-old Irish indoor 1500 m record with a time of 3:33:49 for third at the World Tour Indoor Final in Birmingham. He was also 0.01 seconds inside Ray Flynn's national outdoor mark from 1982.

In July 2023, Coscoran lowered his own Irish record to 3:30.42 at the Diamond League event in Silesia. Selected for the 1500m at the 2023 World Athletics Championships, he reached the semi-finals.

In December 2023, Coscoran ran a personal best time over 10,000 m in Melbourne, running 27:56.34 to win the Zatopek 10k.

=== 2024 ===
In January 2024, he ran a new Irish 5000 m national record of 13:12.56 in Boston, Massachusetts.

He was selected for the Irish team for the 2024 European Athletics Championships where he qualified for the final of the 1500 metres and finished in 13th place. He lowered his personal best for the mile to 3:50.49 at the London Athletics Meet on 20 July 2024. He competed at the 2024 Summer Olympics over 1500 metres.

=== 2025 ===
On 2 February 2025, he ran a national indoor record 7:30.75 over 3000 metres to improve the previous Irish indoor record by eight seconds at the New Balance Indoor Grand Prix. Later that month, he ran an Irish record of 3:49.26 in the Wanamaker Mile at the Millrose Games in New York City. In setting this record, he also improved his Irish record in the indoor 1500 metres. He was included for the 3000 metres as part of the Irish team for the 2025 European Athletics Indoor Championships in Apeldoorn, where he qualified for the final, placing sixth overall. Later that month, he was selected for the 1500 metres and 3000 metres races at the 2025 World Athletics Indoor Championships in Nanjing. He finished in sixth place in the 3000 metres. In May 2025, he won the men's 3000 metres in the 2025 Grand Slam Track event in Miami, ahead of Grant Fisher and George Mills. He won the 5000m and second behind Cathal Doyle in the 1500m at the 2025 Irish Athletics Championships.

In September 2025, he was finalist over 1500 metres at the 2025 World Championships in Tokyo, Japan, placing twelfth. He also competed over 5000 metres in Tokyo, without from the semi-finals. He was selected to compete in the mixed team relay at the 2025 European Cross Country Championships in Portugal.

=== 2026 ===
On 24 January 2026, Coscoran ran the 3000 metres indoors in 7:30.97 to finish runner-up to Cam Myers at the Indoor Grand Prix, in Boston. The following week, he ran 3:49.54 to finish fifth in the Wanamaker Mile at the Millrose Games in New York, just 0.28 seconds outside his personal best set at the same event the previous year, and his second fastest indoor mile. On 19 February, he lowered the Irish indoor national record for the 1500 metres to 3:33.09 in Liévin, France. On 1 March 2026, he placed eighth in the 3000 metres at the Irish Indoor Athletics Championships having been involved in a racing incident with Darragh McElhinney from which Coscoran fell, when well placed with 100 metres to go. Despite the fall, he was selected for the 3000 metres at the 2026 World Athletics Indoor Championships in Toruń, Poland, in March 2026, finishing thirteenth in 7:43.89.

In May, Coscoran ran his fastest outdoor season opener with 3:31.65 for the 1500 metres at the 2026 Diamond League meeting in Rabat. On 26 July, he won the 1500 metres title at the Irish Championship ahead of defending champion Cathal Doyle and Nick Griggs.

On 15 August 2026, Coscoran won the bronze medal at the 1500 metres at the European Championships, finishing in a time of 3:36.24 after displaying a turn of speed on the home straight having been in seventh place on the final bend. It was a first major championship medal for Coscoran who after the race said "I just bided my time and waited for spots to open up and made my move. I knew I was going to get the medal with about 10 metres to go…It was burn up over the last 100m but I always have good wheels on the last straight, so I was happy".

== Statistics ==
Grand Slam Track results
Slam	Race group	Event	Pl.	Time	Prize money
2025 Miami Slam	Long distance	3000 m	1st	8:17.56	US$50,000
2025 Miami Slam	Long distance	5000 m	3rd	13:46.30	US$50,000
2025 Philadelphia Slam	Long distance	3000 m	4th	8:02.17	US$12,500
