= Pietro Arese =

Italian middle-distance runner

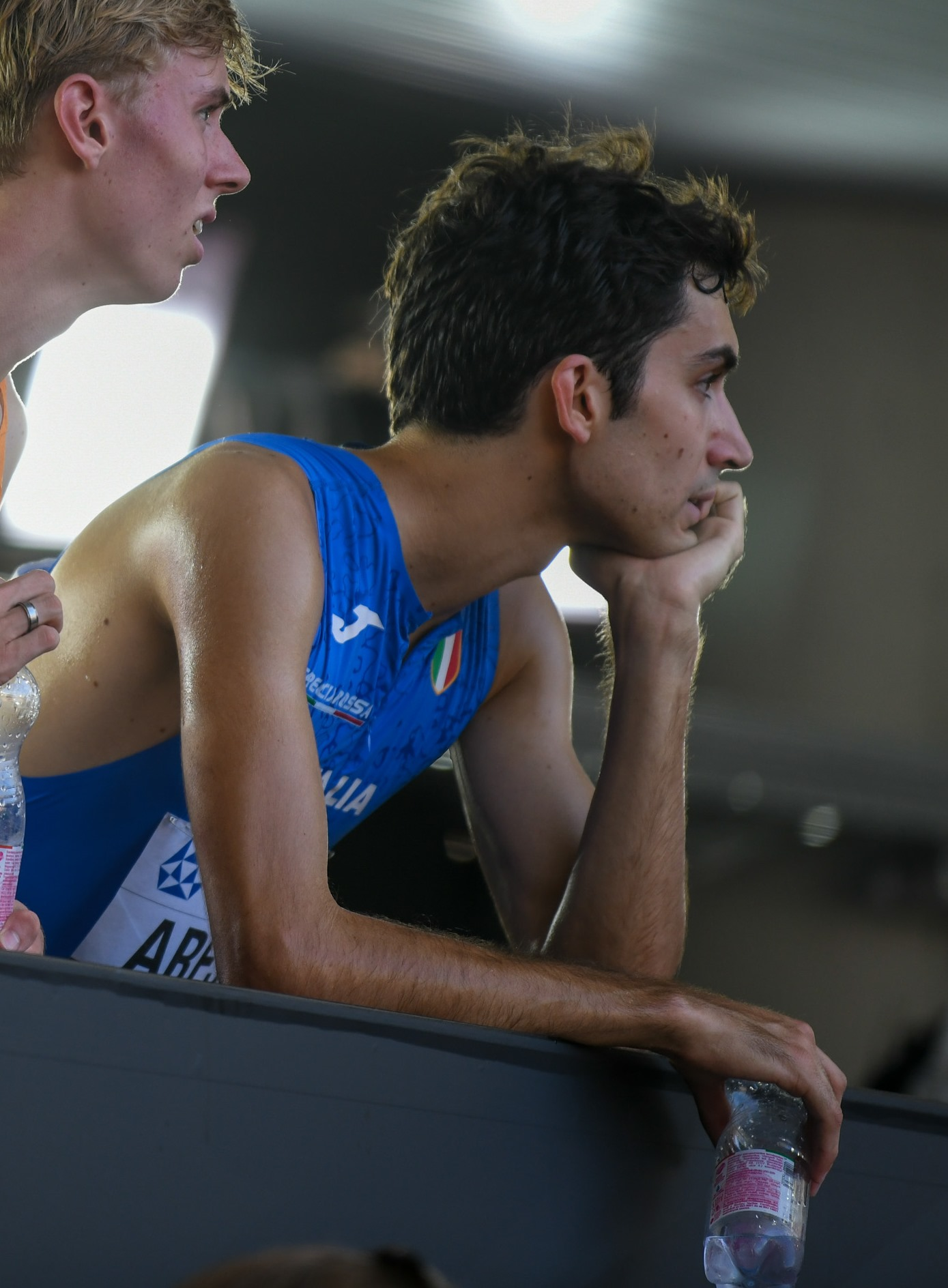
- Arese at Budapest 2023

Personal information
- Born: 8 October 1999 (age 27) Turin, Italy
- Height: 1.89 m (6 ft 2 in)
- Weight: 69 kg (152 lb)

Sport
- Country: Italy
- Sport: Athletics
- Event: Middle-distance running
- Club: G.S. Fiamme Gialle
- Coached by: Silvano Danzi

Achievements and titles
- Personal bests: 1500 m outdoor: 3:30.74 (2024) NR; 1500 m indoor: 3:37.31 (2022); 3000 m outdoor: 8:09.12; 3000 m indoor: 7:38.42 (2024)
Medal record
Men's athletics
Representing Italy
European Championships
Bronze medal – third place	2024 Rome	1500 metres
European Cross Country Championships
Gold medal – first place	2024 Antalya	Mixed relay

Pietro Arese (born 8 October 1999) is an Italian middle-distance runner.

No kinship with the middle-distance runner Franco Arese, former European champion and former president of the Italian Athletics Federation (FIDAL).

== Career ==
His sporting explosion in the winter of 2021, when at the age of 21 he became the Italian indoor champion both on the 1500 m and on the 3000 m, in both cases, an unusual thing, significantly improving his times on the corresponding distances, but outdoors. Thus earning his first call-up to the national team for the 2021 European Indoor Championships. On 6 June 2023, during the Irena Szewińska Memorial, he won the 1500 m becoming the second-fastest Italian ever.

== Achievements ==
Senior level

Year	Competition	Venue	Rank	Event	Performance	Notes
2021	European Indoor Championships	(Poland) Toruń	31st	1500 m	3:43.55	NQ
2022	World Indoor Championships	(Serbia) Belgrade	8th	1500 m	3:37.60	
2022	European Athletics Championships	(Germany) Munich	4th	1500 m	3:35.00	PB
2023	World Athletics Championships	(Hungary) Budapest	8th (sf)	1500 m	3:33.11	PB
2024	Olympic Games	(France) Paris	8th	1500 m	3:30.74	NR PB

== National titles ==
Arese won 3 national championships.

- Italian Athletics Indoor Championships
  - 1500 m: 2021, 2023
  - 3000 m: 2021

== See also ==
- Italian all-time lists - 1500 metres
