= George Mills (runner) =

British middle-distance runner (born 1999)

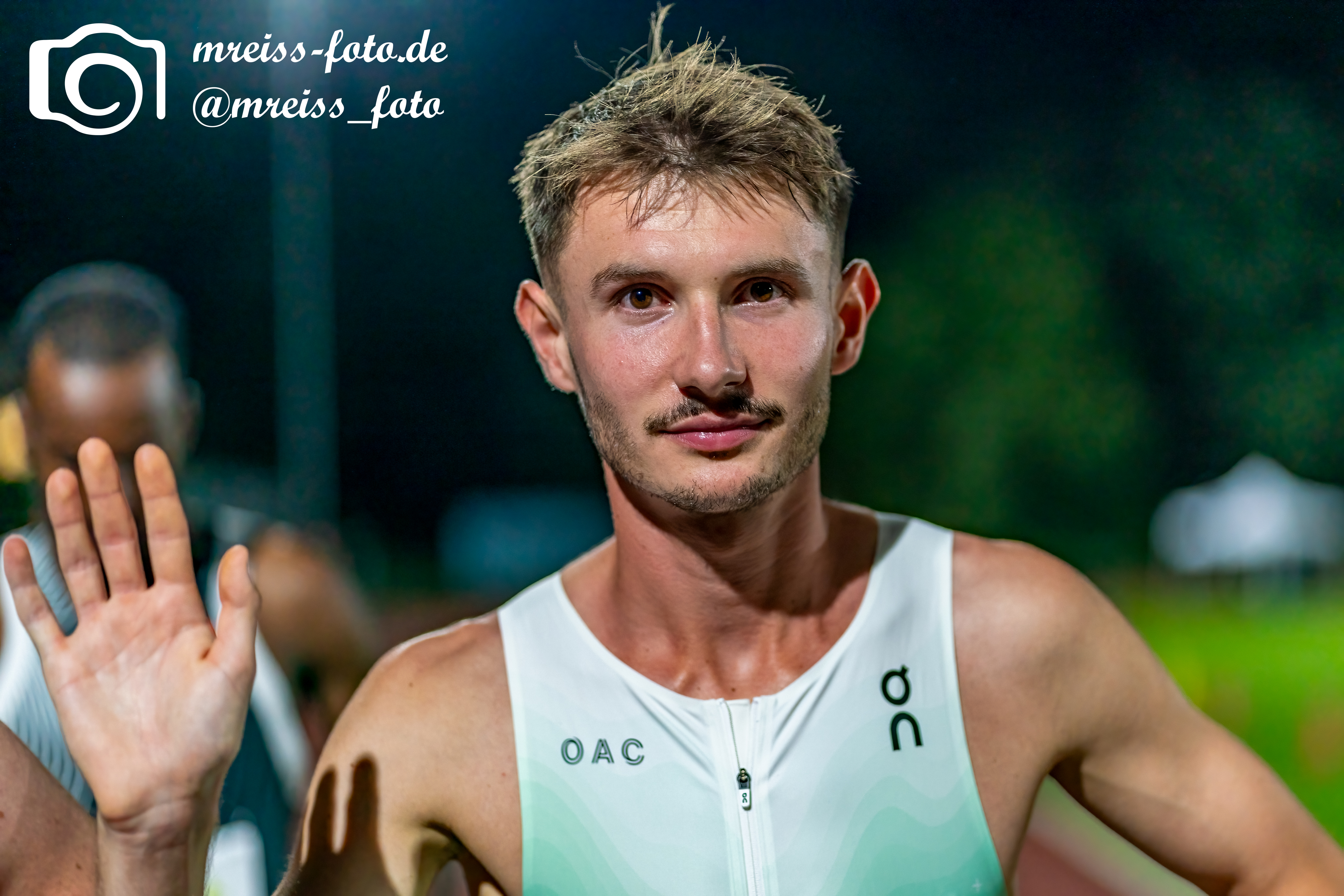
- Mills in 2023

Personal information
- Nationality: British (English)
- Born: 12 May 1999 (age 27) Harrogate, England

Sport
- Sport: Athletics
- Event: 1500 metres
- Club: Brighton Phoenix
- Coached by: Jon Bigg

Achievements and titles
- Personal bests: Information taken from World Athletics Page.: Outdoors; 400 metres: 49.09 (Middlesbrough 2015); 800 metres: 1:46.68 (Manchester 2021); 1500 metres: 3:28.36 (Paris 2025); Mile: 3:47.65 (Eugene 2023); 5000 m: 12:46.59 NR (Bislett 2025); Indoors; 600 m: 1:18.84i (Manchester 2020); 800 m: 1:47.30i (Erfurt 2023); 1500 m: 3:35.88i (Karlsruhe 2023); Mile: 3:48.93 (New York 2024); 5000 m: 12:58.68i (Boston 2024); Road; 10 kilometres: 29:32 (Telford 2021)
Medal record
Men's athletics
Representing Great Britain
European Championships
Silver medal – second place	2024 Rome	5000 m
European Indoor Championships
Silver medal – second place	2025 Apeldoorn	3000 m

George Mills (born 12 May 1999) is an English athlete specialising in the 1500 metres and 5000 metres. He competed at the 2024 Summer Olympics.

== Biography ==
Mills became British champion when winning the 1500 metres event at the 2020 British Athletics Championships in a time of 3 min 51.39 secs.

On 16 September 2023 at the Eugene Diamond League meeting, with a third place finish Mills moved to third place on the British all-time list for the mile behind Steve Cram and Sebastian Coe with a time of 3:47.65.

On 26 January 2024, Mills ran a personal best time of 12:58.68 in the indoor 5000 m at the BU John Thomas Terrier Classic. Mills came in 2nd place in the Scarlet Heat, ahead of Yared Nuguse (13:02.09) and behind Edwin Kurgat of Under Armour (12:57.52). This hit the 2024 Olympic standard of 13:05.00.

On 11 February 2024, Mills finished 3rd in the NYRR Wanamaker Mile, in an indoor personal best time of 3:48.93. At the 2024 European Athletics Championships Mills won a silver medal in the 5000 m behind Jakob Ingebrigtsen.

After winning the 1500 metres silver medal at the 2024 British Athletics Championships, Mills was subsequently named in the Great Britain team for the 2024 Summer Olympics.

Mills got knocked out of the 1500 m semi-finals. In the 5000 m heats, George was involved in a collision, which led to a heated argument with Hugo Hay, as George felt he had caused the collision. George along with the other 3 fallers advanced to the final after it was reviewed. In the final, Mills finished in 21st place.

On 23 February 2025, Mills won the gold medal in the 3000 metres at the British Indoor Athletics Championships, setting a new championship record of 7:40.16 in the process.

At the 2025 European Athletics Indoor Championships in Apeldoorn, Mills won a silver medal in the 3000 metres.

On 12 June 2025, he set a new British record for the 5000 metres, running 12:46.59 as he finished in fourth place in the Diamond League event at the Bislett Games in Oslo.

== Personal life ==
His father is former professional footballer Danny Mills. His brother is Preston North End player Stanley Mills.

== Statistics ==
Grand Slam Track results
Slam	Race group	Event	Pl.	Time	Prize money
2025 Miami Slam	Long distance	3000 m	3rd	8:17.77	US$25,000
2025 Miami Slam	Long distance	5000 m	7th	13:52.11	US$25,000
