= Hillary Ngetich =

Kenyan middle-distance runner

Hillary Cheruiyot Ngetich
Personal information
- Nationality: Kenyan
- Born: September 15, 1995 (age 31)
- Height: 171 cm (5 ft 7 1/2 in)
- Weight: 57 kg (126 lb)

Sport
- Sport: Athletics
- Event: 1500 metres

Achievements and titles
- Personal best: 1500m: 3:32.97 (2016)
Medal record
Men's athletics
Representing Kenya
World U20 Championships
| Silver medal – second place | 2012 Barcelona | 1500 m |
| Bronze medal – third place | 2014 Eugene | 1500 m |

Hillary Cheruiyot Ngetich (born 15 September 1995) is a Kenyan middle-distance runner specializing in the 1500 metres. He is a two-time World Athletics U20 Championships medalist in the 1500 m, in 2012 and 2014.

== Biography ==
As a 14 year old, Ngetich ran a time of 3:51.00 at altitude for the 1500 metres at the Kenyan national junior championships.

His first major international competition was at the 2012 IAAF World Junior Championships, where he set a PB of 3:40.39 in the final to finish 2nd. Ngetich only lost to Hamza Driouch of Qatar, who later served a two-year drug suspension for doping that annulled his 2012 Olympic results, but not his world junior championships result.

Two years later, Ngetich won another medal at the World Junior Championships in Eugene, Oregon, this time a bronze losing to countryman Jonathan Kiplimo Sawe and Abdi Waiss Mouhyadin.

Ngetich ran his personal best time of 3:32.97 at the 2016 KBC Night of Athletics, towed along by Ayanleh Souleiman. His best finish at a Diamond League meeting was at the 2015 Shanghai Golden Grand Prix, where he finished 2nd in the 1500 m in a photo finish.

== Statistics ==
=== Personal bests ===
| Event | Mark | Competition | Venue | Date |
|---|---|---|---|---|
| 1500 metres | 3:32.97 | KBC Night of Athletics | Heusden, Belgium | 16 July 2016 |
| 3000 metres | 7:44.73i | PSD Bank Meeting | Düsseldorf, Germany | 1 February 2017 |
