= 2010 World Junior Championships in Athletics – Men's 1500 metres =

The men's 1500 metres event at the 2010 World Junior Championships in Athletics was held in Moncton, New Brunswick, Canada, at Moncton Stadium on 20 and 22 July.

== Medalists ==
Gold	Caleb Ndiku; Kenya
Silver	Abderrahmane Anou; Algeria
Bronze	Mohamed Al-Garni; Qatar

== Results ==
=== Final ===
22 July

Rank	Name	Nationality	Time	Notes
1st place, gold medalist(s)	Caleb Ndiku	Kenya	3:37.30	
2nd place, silver medalist(s)	Abderrahmane Anou	Algeria	3:38.86	
3rd place, bronze medalist(s)	Mohamed Al-Garni	Qatar	3:38.91	
4	Mohamed Bensghir	Morocco	3:39.97	
5	Alberto Imedio	Spain	3:41.82	
6	Marcel Fehr	Germany	3:42.72	
7	Otmane Laaroussi	Morocco	3:43.75	
8	Brett Robinson	Australia	3:44.06	
9	Paul Robinson	Ireland	3:44.56	
10	Bryan Cantero	France	3:44.61	
11	Nemanja Cerovac	Serbia	3:46.23	
12	Jonas Leandersson	Sweden	3:49.91	

=== Heats ===
20 July

==== Heat 1 ====
Rank	Name	Nationality	Time	Notes
1	Mohamed Al-Garni	Qatar	3:41.99	Q
2	Otmane Laaroussi	Morocco	3:43.27	Q
3	Marcel Fehr	Germany	3:43.80	Q
4	Abderrahmane Anou	Algeria	3:44.09	q
5	Bryan Cantero	France	3:44.45	q
6	Henrik Ingebrigtsen	Norway	3:45.31	
7	John Malette	Canada	3:45.57	
8	Soresa Fida	Ethiopia	3:46.45	
9	Levent Ates	Turkey	3:48.29	
10	Tarik Moukrime	Belgium	3:49.47	
11	Moses Kibet	Uganda	3:50.53	
12	Darren McBrearty	Ireland	3:52.62	
13	Homilzio dos Santos	São Tomé and Príncipe	4:19.35	
	Hillary Kipkorir Maiyo	Kenya	DQ	IAAF rule 163.2

==== Heat 2 ====
Rank	Name	Nationality	Time	Notes
1	Mohamed Bensghir	Morocco	3:47.75	Q
2	Jonas Leandersson	Sweden	3:47.84	Q
3	Nemanja Cerovac	Serbia	3:47.86	Q
4	Samir Dahmani	France	3:47.89	
5	Jeremy Rae	Canada	3:47.99	
6	Todd Wakefield	Australia	3:48.05	
7	Alex Cherop	Uganda	3:48.14	
8	Bartosz Kowalczyk	Poland	3:49.15	
9	George Preda	Romania	3:50.34	
10	Timo Benitz	Germany	3:50.47	
11	Ratlale Mokone	South Africa	3:50.79	
12	Elias Gedyon	United States	3:52.44	
13	Evandro Maciel	Brazil	3:53.55	
14	Cephas Nyimbili	Zambia	3:58.99	

==== Heat 3 ====
Rank	Name	Nationality	Time	Notes
1	Caleb Ndiku	Kenya	3:42.32	Q
2	Alberto Imedio	Spain	3:42.62	Q
3	Brett Robinson	Australia	3:43.67	Q
4	Paul Robinson	Ireland	3:44.04	q
5	Damian Roszko	Poland	3:44.60	
6	Peter Callahan	United States	3:45.04	
7	Miguel Moreira	Portugal	3:46.46	
8	Harry Ellis	United Kingdom	3:46.83	
9	Hamada Mohamed	Egypt	3:47.05	
10	Kemoy Campbell	Jamaica	3:47.47	
11	Saddam Zergui	Algeria	3:49.27	
12	Yves Sikubwabo	Rwanda	3:50.15	
13	Harold Lamour	Haiti	4:13.93	
	Zebene Alemayehu	Ethiopia	DNF	

== Participation ==
According to an unofficial count, 42 athletes from 30 countries participated in the event.

- Algeria (2)
- Australia (2)
- Belgium (1)
- Brazil (1)
- Canada (2)
- Egypt (1)
- Ethiopia (2)
- France (2)
- Germany (2)
- Haiti (1)
- Ireland (2)
- Jamaica (1)
- Kenya (2)
- Morocco (2)
- Norway (1)
- Poland (2)
- Portugal (1)
- Qatar (1)
- Romania (1)
- Rwanda (1)
- São Tomé and Príncipe (1)
- Serbia (1)
- South Africa (1)
- Spain (1)
- Sweden (1)
- Turkey (1)
- Uganda (2)
- United Kingdom (1)
- United States (2)
- Zambia (1)
