= 2012 World Junior Championships in Athletics – Men's 1500 metres =

The men's 1500 metres at the 2012 World Junior Championships in Athletics was held at the Estadi Olímpic Lluís Companys on 10 and 12 July.

== Medalists ==
Gold	Hamza Driouch; Qatar
Silver	Hillary Cheruiyot Ngetich; Kenya
Bronze	Abdelhadi Labäli; Morocco

== Records ==
Prior to the competition, the existing world junior and championship records were as follows.

World Junior Record	Cornelius Chirchir (KEN)	3:30.24	Fontvieille, Monaco	19 July 2002
Championship Record	Abdalaati Iguider (MAR)	3:35.53	Grosseto, Italy	15 July 2004
World Junior Leading	Geoffrey Barusei (KEN)	3:33.39	Hengelo, Netherlands	27 May 2012

== Results ==
=== Heats ===
Qualification: The first 3 of each heat (Q) and the 3 fastest times (q) qualified

Rank	Heat	Lane	Name	Nationality	Time	Note
1	2	7	Hamza Driouch	Qatar	3:38.06	Q
2	1	2	Teshome Dirirsa	Ethiopia	3:41.78	Q
3	1	10	Dominic Mutuku Mutili	Kenya	3:41.97	Q
4	1	5	Mohammed Abid	Morocco	3:42.58	Q
5	2	12	Yenew Tebikew	Ethiopia	3:42.69	Q
6	2	11	Carlos Díaz	Chile	3:43.16	Q, NJ
7	2	8	Filip Ingebrigtsen	Norway	3:44.04	q, PB
8	2	13	Federico Bruno	Argentina	3:44.81	q
9	1	9	Mohamed Abdikadar	Italy	3:46.37	q
10	3	1	Teklit Teweldebrhan	Eritrea	3:46.46	Q
11	3	10	Hillary Cheruiyot Ngetich	Kenya	3:46.54	Q
12	3	4	Abdelhadi Labäli	Morocco	3:46.75	Q
13	3	6	Charlie Grice	Great Britain	3:47.05	
14	1	3	Robert Denault	Canada	3:48.47	
15	2	6	Abdessalem Ayouni	Tunisia	3:48.67	
16	2	2	Fabian Brunswig	Germany	3:48.72	
17	3	2	Yusuke Uchikoshi	Japan	3:49.06	
18	1	12	Sean Tobin	Ireland	3:49.11	
19	1	1	Izaic Yorks	United States	3:49.21	
20	3	5	Joao Bussotti Neves	Italy	3:49.37	
21	1	7	Julian Oakley	New Zealand	3:49.43	
22	1	11	Julius Lawnik	Germany	3:49.51	
23	3	8	Łukasz Gurtkiewicz	Poland	3:49.61	
24	3	12	Yunus Emre Cavusli	Turkey	3:50.12	
25	2	5	Ben Moynihan	New Zealand	3:50.59	
26	1	8	Ferdinand Kvan Edman	Norway	3:50.95	
27	2	3	Abdullah Obaid Al Salhi	Saudi Arabia	3:51.78	
28	3	11	David Lorenzo	Spain	3:52.98	
29	3	9	Ruairí Finnegan	Ireland	3:53.95	
30	2	9	Kyle Grieve	Canada	3:54.37	
31	2	1	Austin Mudd	United States	3:54.82	
32	3	3	Ioran Etchechury	Brazil	3:55.15	
33	1	4	Marc Alcalá	Spain	3:55.68	
34	2	10	Egide Kayigire	Rwanda	3:56.75	PB
35	1	6	Mandhar Legseir	Algeria	3:59.30	
36	2	4	Boldoo Odbayar	Mongolia	4:04.65	PB
37	3	7	Carles Gómez	Andorra	4:16.99	PB

=== Final ===
Rank	Order	Name	Nationality	Time	Note
1st place, gold medalist(s)	6	Hamza Driouch	Qatar	3:39.04	
2nd place, silver medalist(s)	1	Hillary Cheruiyot Ngetich	Kenya	3:40.39	PB
3rd place, bronze medalist(s)	12	Abdelhadi Labäli	Morocco	3:40.60	
4	7	Mohammed Abid	Morocco	3:41.73	
5	8	Teklit Teweldebrhan	Eritrea	3:42.63	
6	2	Dominic Mutuku Mutili	Kenya	3:42.79	
7	3	Carlos Díaz	Chile	3:44.02	
8	11	Yenew Tebikew	Ethiopia	3:44.02	
9	4	Teshome Dirirsa	Ethiopia	3:44.54	
10	5	Filip Ingebrigtsen	Norway	3:46.54	
11	9	Mohamed Abdikadar	Italy	3:53.74	
12	10	Federico Bruno	Argentina	3:55.38	

== Participation ==
According to an unofficial count, 37 athletes from 26 countries participated in the event.

- Algeria (1)
- Andorra (1)
- Argentina (1)
- Brazil (1)
- Canada (2)
- Chile (1)
- Eritrea (1)
- Ethiopia (2)
- Germany (2)
- Ireland (2)
- Italy (2)
- Japan (1)
- Kenya (2)
- Mongolia (1)
- Morocco (2)
- New Zealand (2)
- Norway (2)
- Poland (1)
- Qatar (1)
- Rwanda (1)
- Saudi Arabia (1)
- Spain (2)
- Tunisia (1)
- Turkey (1)
- United Kingdom (1)
- United States (2)
