= 2013 European Athletics U23 Championships – Men's 1500 metres =

The Men's 1500 metres event at the 2013 European Athletics U23 Championships was held in Tampere, Finland, at Ratina Stadium on 13 and 14 July.

== Medalists ==
Gold	Pieter-Jan Hannes; Belgium
Silver	Charlie Grice; United Kingdom
Bronze	Alberto Imedio; Spain

== Results ==
=== Final ===
14 July 2013

Rank	Name	Nationality	Time	Notes
1st place, gold medalist(s)	Pieter-Jan Hannes	Belgium	3:43.83	
2nd place, silver medalist(s)	Charlie Grice	United Kingdom	3:44.41	
3rd place, bronze medalist(s)	Alberto Imedio	Spain	3:44.65	
4	Paul Robinson	Ireland	3:45.12	
5	Timo Benitz	Germany	3:45.38	
6	Filip Ingebrigtsen	Norway	3:45.48	
7	Yimer Getahun	Israel	3:45.64	
8	Tarik Moukrime	Belgium	3:46.46	
9	Bryan Cantero	France	3:47.35	
10	Damian Roszko	Poland	3:47.49	
11	Vegard Ølstad	Norway	3:49.76	
12	Richard Douma	Netherlands	3:54.62	

Intermediate times:
400m: 1:02.45 Pieter-Jan Hannes Belgium
800m: 2:05.83 Pieter-Jan Hannes Belgium
1200m: 3:03.30 Damian Roszko Poland

=== Heats ===
Qualified: First 4 in each heat (Q) and 4 best performers (q) advance to the Final

==== Summary ====
Rank	Name	Nationality	Time	Notes
1	Pieter-Jan Hannes	Belgium	3:42.88	Q
2	Timo Benitz	Germany	3:42.92	Q
3	Charlie Grice	United Kingdom	3:42.95	Q
4	Alberto Imedio	Spain	3:43.10	Q
5	Yimer Getahun	Israel	3:43.38	q PB
6	Vegard Ølstad	Norway	3:43.47	q PB
7	Richard Douma	Netherlands	3:43.91	q PB
8	Paul Robinson	Ireland	3:44.73	Q
9	Filip Ingebrigtsen	Norway	3:44.86	Q
10	Tarik Moukrime	Belgium	3:44.87	Q
11	Bryan Cantero	France	3:44.93	Q
12	Damian Roszko	Poland	3:44.98	q
13	Levent Ateş	Turkey	3:45.25	
14	Martin Sperlich	Germany	3:46.22	
15	Emanuel Rolim	Portugal	3:46.37	
16	Antoine Martinet	France	3:46.98	
17	Elmar Engholm	Sweden	3:47.11	
18	Bartosz Kotłowski	Poland	3:47.65	
19	Ivan Popov	Bulgaria	3:49.80	
20	Henrik Ingebrigtsen	Norway	3:50.16	
21	Marco Bertolotti	Finland	3:52.09	
22	Lars Paardekooper	Netherlands	3:52.37	
23	Darren McBrearty	Ireland	3:53.20	
	Mattia Moretti	Italy	DNF	

==== Details ====
===== Heat 1 =====
13 July 2013 / 11:00

Rank	Name	Nationality	Time	Notes
1	Pieter-Jan Hannes	Belgium	3:42.88	Q
2	Timo Benitz	Germany	3:42.92	Q
3	Charlie Grice	United Kingdom	3:42.95	Q
4	Alberto Imedio	Spain	3:43.10	Q
5	Yimer Getahun	Israel	3:43.38	q PB
6	Vegard Ølstad	Norway	3:43.47	q PB
7	Richard Douma	Netherlands	3:43.91	q PB
8	Antoine Martinet	France	3:46.98	
9	Bartosz Kotłowski	Poland	3:47.65	
10	Ivan Popov	Bulgaria	3:49.80	
11	Darren McBrearty	Ireland	3:53.20	
	Mattia Moretti	Italy	DNF	

Intermediate times:
400m: 59.85 Alberto Imedio Spain
800m: 2:01.82 Alberto Imedio Spain
1200m: 3:01.13 Pieter-Jan Hannes Belgium

===== Heat 2 =====
13 July 2013 / 11:10

Rank	Name	Nationality	Time	Notes
1	Paul Robinson	Ireland	3:44.73	Q
2	Filip Ingebrigtsen	Norway	3:44.86	Q
3	Tarik Moukrime	Belgium	3:44.87	Q
4	Bryan Cantero	France	3:44.93	Q
5	Damian Roszko	Poland	3:44.98	q
6	Levent Ateş	Turkey	3:45.25	
7	Martin Sperlich	Germany	3:46.22	
8	Emanuel Rolim	Portugal	3:46.37	
9	Elmar Engholm	Sweden	3:47.11	
10	Henrik Ingebrigtsen	Norway	3:50.16	
11	Marco Bertolotti	Finland	3:52.09	
12	Lars Paardekooper	Netherlands	3:52.37	

Intermediate times:
400m: 1:00.44 Bryan Cantero France
800m: 2:02.89 Bryan Cantero France
1200m: 3:01.71 Bryan Cantero France

== Participation ==
According to an unofficial count, 24 athletes from 16 countries participated in the event.

- Belgium (2)
- Bulgaria (1)
- Finland (1)
- France (2)
- Germany (2)
- Ireland (2)
- Israel (1)
- Italy (1)
- Netherlands (2)
- Norway (3)
- Poland (2)
- Portugal (1)
- Spain (1)
- Sweden (1)
- Turkey (1)
- United Kingdom (1)
