= 2018 European Athletics Championships – Men's 1500 metres =

Men's 1500 metres at the 2018 European Athletics Championships
- Venue: Olympic Stadium
- Location: Berlin
- Dates: August 8 (round 1); August 10 (final)
- Competitors: 34 from 19 nations
- Winning time: 3:38.10

Medalists
gold medal	Jakob Ingebrigtsen	Norway
silver medal	Marcin Lewandowski	Poland
bronze medal	Jake Wightman	Great Britain

The men's 1500 metres at the 2018 European Athletics Championships took place at the Olympic Stadium on 8 and 10 August.

== Records ==
Standing records prior to the 2018 European Athletics Championships
World record	Hicham El Guerrouj (MAR)	3:26.00	Rome, Italy	14 July 1998
European record	Mo Farah (GBR)	3:28.81	Monaco	19 July 2013
Championship record	Fermín Cacho (ESP)	3:35.27	Helsinki, Finland	9 August 1994
World Leading	Timothy Cheruiyot (KEN)	3:28.41	Monaco	20 July 2018
European Leading	Filip Ingebrigtsen (NOR)	3:30.01	Monaco	20 July 2018

== Schedule ==
Date	Time	Round
8 August 2018	12:15	Round 1
10 August 2018	21:50	Final

All times are local times (UTC+2)

== Results ==
=== Round 1 ===
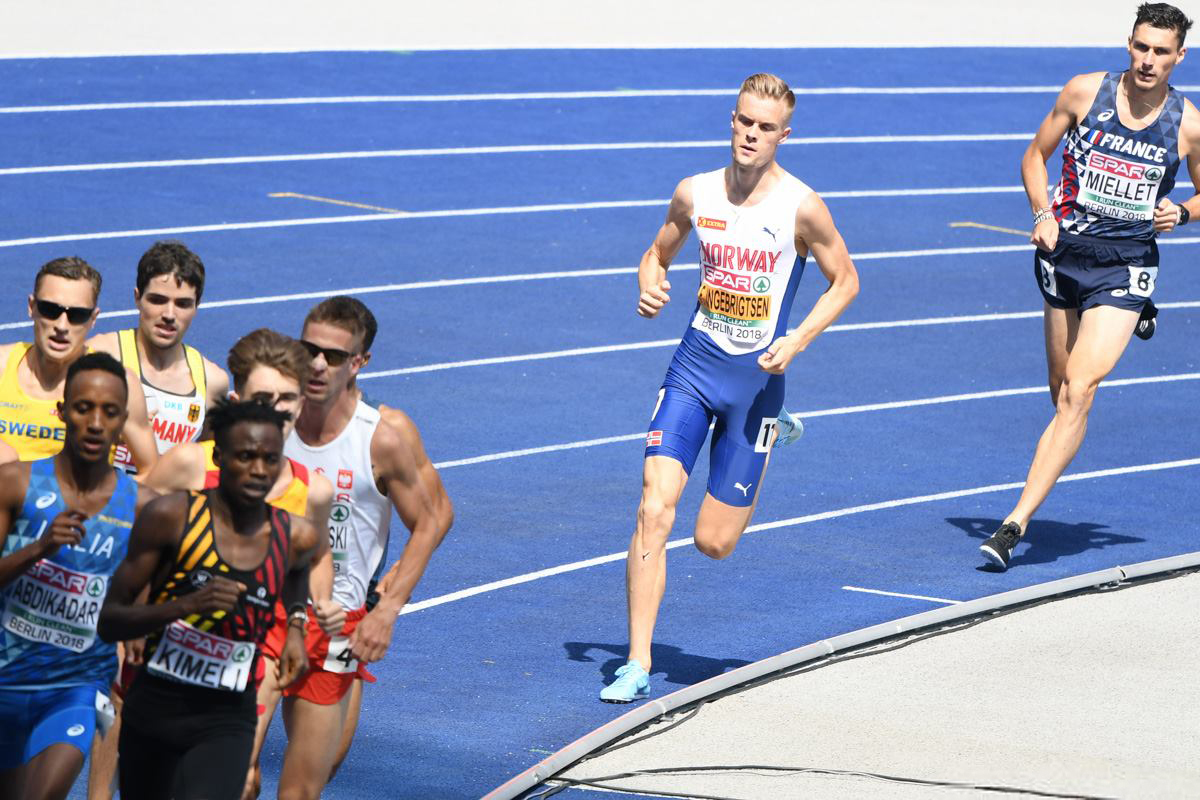
Heat 2

First 3 (Q) and next 3 fastest (q) qualify for the final.

Rank	Heat	Lane	Name	Nationality	Time	Note
1	3	2	Jake Wightman	Great Britain	3:40.73	Q
2	2	4	Marcin Lewandowski	Poland	3:40.74	Q
3	2	7	Charlie Grice	Great Britain	3:40.80	Q
4	3	1	Jakob Ingebrigtsen	Norway	3:40.81	Q
5	3	7	Joao Bussotti	Italy	3:40.87	Q
6	2	11	Filip Ingebrigtsen	Norway	3:40.88	Q
7	3	3	Simas Bertašius	Lithuania	3:40.95	q
8	2	10	Timo Benitz	Germany	3:41.01	q
9	3	8	Ismael Debjani	Belgium	3:41.09	q
10	2	3	Mohad Abdikadar	Italy	3:41.09	q
11	2	2	Kalle Berglund	Sweden	3:41.25	
12	3	9	Simon Denissel	France	3:41.67	
13	3	5	Elmar Engholm	Sweden	3:42.01	
14	3	6	Marius Probst	Germany	3:42.37	
15	2	6	Isaac Kimeli	Belgium	3:42.77	
16	3	4	Jan Hochstrasser	Switzerland	3:42.80	
17	2	5	Adrian Ben	Spain	3:42.81	
18	3	10	Tamás Kazi	Hungary	3:42.98	
19	2	9	Amine Khadiri	Cyprus	3:45.97	
20	1	9	Chris O'Hare	Great Britain	3:49.06	Q
21	1	5	Homiyu Tesfaye	Germany	3:49.28	Q
22	1	3	Henrik Ingebrigtsen	Norway	3:49.54	Q
23	1	4	Johan Rogestedt	Sweden	3:49.73	
24	1	2	Jakub Holuša	Czech Republic	3:49.82	
25	1	10	Charles Grethen	Luxembourg	3:49.97	
26	1	7	Ferdinand Kvan Edman	Norway	3:50.26	
27	1	11	Baptiste Mischler	France	3:50.96	
28	2	8	Alexis Miellet	France	3:51.61	
29	1	12	Volodymyr Kyts	Ukraine	3:52.77	
30	1	8	Peter Callahan	Belgium	3:54.23	
31	2	1	Benjámin Kovács	Hungary	3:54.29	
32	3	11	Harvey Dixon	Gibraltar	3:54.70	
33	1	1	Dario Ivanovski	Macedonia	3:57.52	
34	1	6	Carles Gómez	Andorra	4:00.02	

=== Final ===
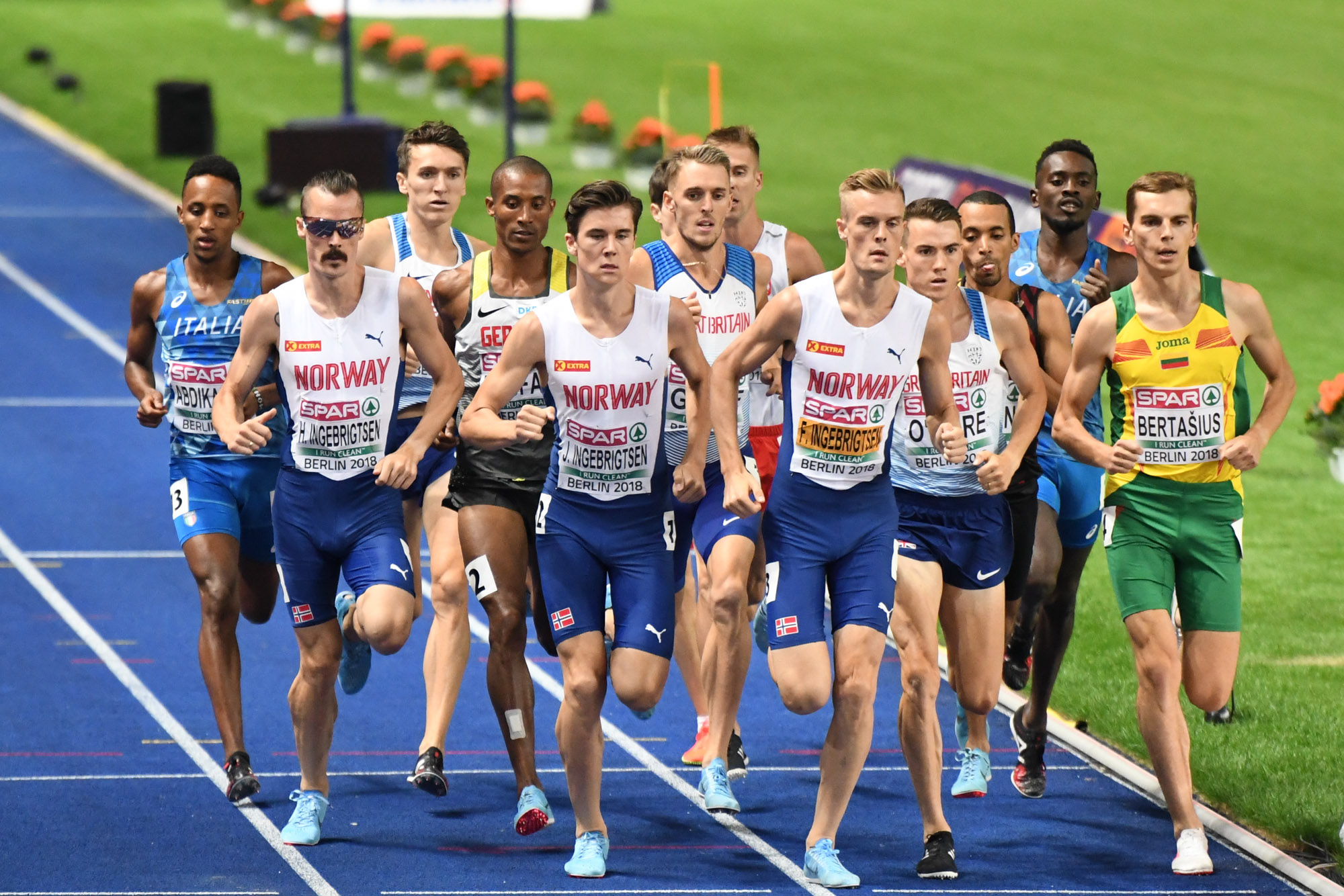
The final

Rank	Name	Nationality	Time	Note
1st place, gold medalist(s)	Jakob Ingebrigtsen	Norway	3:38.10	
2nd place, silver medalist(s)	Marcin Lewandowski	Poland	3:38.14	
3rd place, bronze medalist(s)	Jake Wightman	Great Britain	3:38.25	
4	Henrik Ingebrigtsen	Norway	3:38.50	
5	Charlie Grice	Great Britain	3:38.65	
6	Simas Bertašius	Lithuania	3:39.04	
7	Timo Benitz	Germany	3:39.28	
8	Ismael Debjani	Belgium	3:39.48	
9	Chris O'Hare	Great Britain	3:39.53	
10	Mohad Abdikadar	Italy	3:39.95	
11	Joao Bussotti	Italy	3:41.31	
12	Filip Ingebrigtsen	Norway	3:41.66	
13	Homiyu Tesfaye	Germany	3:47.83	
