= 2014 World Junior Championships in Athletics – Men's 1500 metres =

The men's 1500 metres at the 2014 World Junior Championships in Athletics was held at Hayward Field from 22 to 24 July.

== Medalists ==
Gold	Jonathan Kiplimo Sawe; Kenya
Silver	Abdi Waiss Mouhyadin; Djibouti
Bronze	Hillary Cheruiyot Ngetich; Kenya

== Records ==
Standing records prior to the 2014 World Junior Championships in Athletics
World Junior Record	Ronald Kwemoi (KEN)	3:28.81	Monaco	18 July 2014
Championship Record	Abdalaati Iguider (MAR)	3:35.53	Grosseto, Italy	15 July 2004
World Junior Leading	Ronald Kwemoi (KEN)	3:28.81	Monaco	18 July 2014
Broken records during the 2014 World Junior Championships in Athletics

== Results ==
=== Final ===
24 July
Start time: 20:39 Temperature: 21 °C Humidity: 53 %

Rank	Name	Nationality	Time	Notes
1st place, gold medalist(s)	Jonathan Kiplimo Sawe	Kenya	3:40.02	SB
2nd place, silver medalist(s)	Abdi Waiss Mouhyadin	Djibouti	3:41.38	
3rd place, bronze medalist(s)	Hillary Cheruiyot Ngetich	Kenya	3:41.61	SB
4	Thiago André	Brazil	3:42.58	
5	Zak Patterson	Australia	3:44.21	PB
6	Jan Petrac	Slovenia	3:44.39	
7	Julius Lawnik	Germany	3:44.96	
8	Alexis Miellet	France	3:45.28	
9	William Levay	Sweden	3:45.31	
10	Yemaneberhan Crippa	Italy	3:47.16	
11	Roy van Eekelen	Netherlands	3:48.57	
12	Hassan Ghachoui	Morocco	3:48.61	

Intermediate times:
400m: 58.23 Hillary Cheruiyot Ngetich
800m: 2:01.31 Jonathan Kiplimo Sawe
1200m: 3:00.03 Jonathan Kiplimo Sawe

=== Heats ===
22 July
First 3 in each heat (Q) and the next 3 fastest (q) advance to the Final

==== Summary ====
Rank	Name	Nationality	Time	Notes
1	Jonathan Kiplimo Sawe	Kenya	3:41.35	Q SB
2	Jan Petrac	Slovenia	3:43.15	Q NJR
3	William Levay	Sweden	3:43.28	Q PB
4	Yemaneberhan Crippa	Italy	3:43.44	q PB
5	Hassan Ghachoui	Morocco	3:45.01	q
6	Julius Lawnik	Germany	3:45.22	q
7	Adam Zenkl	Czech Republic	3:45.79	PB
8	Aregawi Berhane	Ethiopia	3:46.47	
9	Thiago André	Brazil	3:47.68	Q
10	Abdi Waiss Mouhyadin	Djibouti	3:48.36	Q
11	Hillary Cheruiyot Ngetich	Kenya	3:48.40	Q
12	Alexis Miellet	France	3:48.48	Q
13	Roy van Eekelen	Netherlands	3:48.51	Q
14	Mike Tate	Canada	3:48.59	
15	Zak Patterson	Australia	3:48.64	Q
16	Chalachew Shemeles	Ethiopia	3:48.76	SB
17	Patrick Joseph	United States	3:49.00	
18	Süleyman Bekmezci	Turkey	3:49.01	SB
19	Oussama Nabil	Morocco	3:49.49	
20	Grant Fisher	United States	3:49.62	PB
21	Jack Stapleton	Australia	3:49.67	
22	Ivan Malic	Croatia	3:49.68	
23	Shaun Wyllie	United Kingdom	3:49.95	
24	José María Martínez	Mexico	3:50.27	
25	Filip Sasínek	Czech Republic	3:50.39	
26	Vincent Hazeleger	Netherlands	3:51.27	
27	Takieddine Hedeilli	Algeria	3:51.72	
28	Roman Kwiatkowski	Poland	3:52.19	
29	Sergio Jiménez	Spain	3:52.75	
30	Mattia Padovani	Italy	3:53.10	
31	Sebastian Hendel	Germany	3:54.59	
32	Luis Gustavo Solórzano	El Salvador	3:58.05	
33	John Aquino	Guam	4:11.28	

==== Details ====
First 3 in each heat (Q) and the next 3 fastest (q) advance to the Final

===== Heat 1 =====
24 July
Start time: 11:43 Temperature: 20 °C Humidity: 60%

Rank	Name	Nationality	Time	Notes
1	Jonathan Kiplimo Sawe	Kenya	3:41.35	Q SB
2	Jan Petrac	Slovenia	3:43.15	Q NJR
3	William Levay	Sweden	3:43.28	Q PB
4	Yemaneberhan Crippa	Italy	3:43.44	q PB
5	Hassan Ghachoui	Morocco	3:45.01	q
6	Julius Lawnik	Germany	3:45.22	q
7	Adam Zenkl	Czech Republic	3:45.79	PB
8	Aregawi Berhane	Ethiopia	3:46.47	
9	Grant Fisher	United States	3:49.62	PB
10	Sergio Jiménez	Spain	3:52.75	
11	John Aquino	Guam	4:11.28	

Intermediate times:
400m: 58.96 Jonathan Kiplimo Sawe
800m: 2:00.28 Jonathan Kiplimo Sawe
1200m: 3:00.00 Jonathan Kiplimo Sawe

===== Heat 2 =====
24 July
Start time: 11:52 Temperature: 20 °C Humidity: 60%

Rank	Name	Nationality	Time	Notes
1	Thiago André	Brazil	3:47.68	Q
2	Alexis Miellet	France	3:48.48	Q
3	Roy van Eekelen	Netherlands	3:48.51	Q
4	Mike Tate	Canada	3:48.59	
5	Süleyman Bekmezci	Turkey	3:49.01	SB
6	Oussama Nabil	Morocco	3:49.49	
7	Jack Stapleton	Australia	3:49.67	
8	Ivan Malic	Croatia	3:49.68	
9	Filip Sasínek	Czech Republic	3:50.39	
10	Takieddine Hedeilli	Algeria	3:51.72	
11	Sebastian Hendel	Germany	3:54.59	
	Hamza Al Hadi	Libya	DNS	

Intermediate times:
400m: 1:02.33 Filip Sasínek
800m: 2:07.37 Jack Stapleton
1200m: 3:05.42 Thiago André

===== Heat 3 =====
24 July
Start time: 12:00 Temperature: 20 °C Humidity: 60%

Rank	Name	Nationality	Time	Notes
1	Abdi Waiss Mouhyadin	Djibouti	3:48.36	Q
2	Hillary Cheruiyot Ngetich	Kenya	3:48.40	Q
3	Zak Patterson	Australia	3:48.64	Q
4	Chalachew Shemeles	Ethiopia	3:48.76	SB
5	Patrick Joseph	United States	3:49.00	
6	Shaun Wyllie	United Kingdom	3:49.95	
7	José María Martínez	Mexico	3:50.27	
8	Vincent Hazeleger	Netherlands	3:51.27	
9	Roman Kwiatkowski	Poland	3:52.19	
10	Mattia Padovani	Italy	3:53.10	
11	Luis Gustavo Solórzano	El Salvador	3:58.05	

Intermediate times:
400m: 1:03.30 Hillary Cheruiyot Ngetich
800m: 2:08.14 Abdi Waiss Mouhyadin
1200m: 3:07.86 Zak Patterson

== Participation ==
According to an unofficial count, 33 athletes from 24 countries participated in the event.

- Algeria (1)
- Australia (2)
- Brazil (1)
- Canada (1)
- Croatia (1)
- Czech Republic (2)
- Djibouti (1)
- El Salvador (1)
- Ethiopia (2)
- France (1)
- Germany (2)
- Guam (1)
- Italy (2)
- Kenya (2)
- Mexico (1)
- Morocco (2)
- Netherlands (2)
- Poland (1)
- Slovenia (1)
- Spain (1)
- Sweden (1)
- Turkey (1)
- United Kingdom (1)
- United States (2)
