= Charles Grethen =

Luxembourgish middle-distance runner

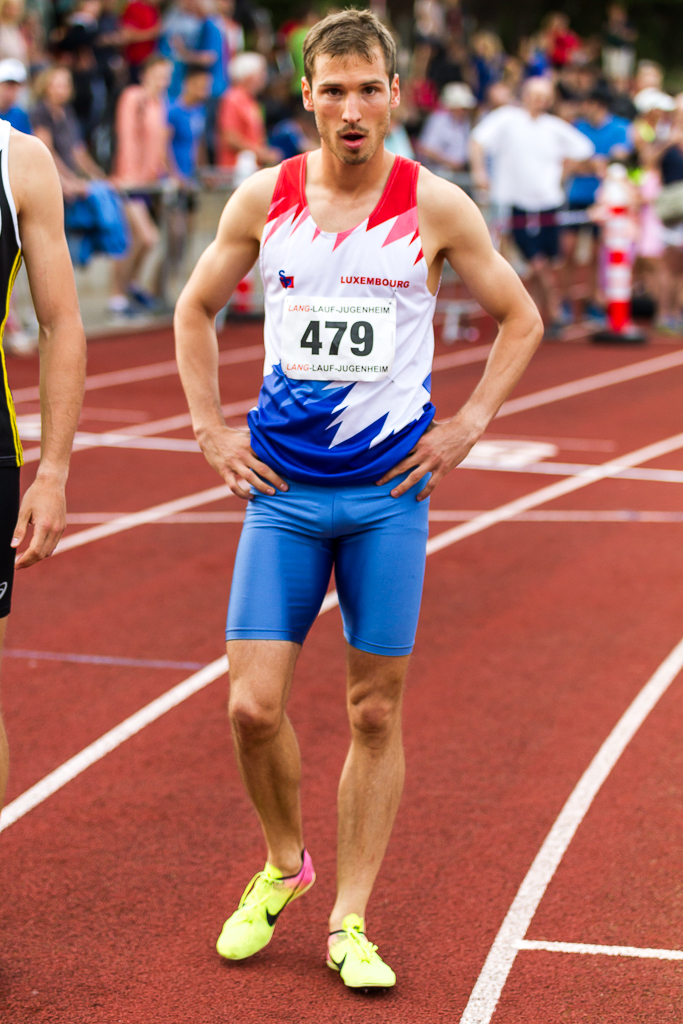
- Grethen in 2018

Personal information
- Born: 2 June 1992 (age 34) Tuntange, Luxembourg
- Education: Texas State University; University of Georgia; University of Luxembourg
- Height: 1.80 m (5 ft 11 in)
- Weight: 65 kg (143 lb)

Sport
- Sport: Athletics
- Event: 800 m
- College team: Georgia Bulldogs

Charles Grethen (born 2 June 1992, in Tuntange) is a Luxembourgish middle-distance runner competing primarily in the 800 and 1500 metres. He represented his country at three consecutive European Championships.

== International competitions ==
Year	Competition	Venue	Position	Event	Notes
Representing Luxembourg
2009	European Youth Olympic Festival	Tampere, Finland	6th (h)	800 m	1:57.6h
2010	World Junior Championships	Moncton, Canada	17th (sf)	800 m	1:52.09
2012	European Championships	Helsinki, Finland	35th (h)	800 m	1:53.22
2013	European U23 Championships	Tampere, Finland	16th (h)	800 m	1:50.01
2014	European Championships	Zürich, Switzerland	31st (h)	800 m	1:50.36
2015	Universiade	Gwangju, South Korea	14th (sf)	800 m	1:49.31
2016	European Championships	Amsterdam, Netherlands	13th (sf)	800 m	1:49.40
2016	Olympic Games	Rio de Janeiro, Brazil	38th (h)	800 m	1:48.93
2017	Games of the Small States of Europe	Serravalle, San Marino	2nd	800 m	1:50.70
2017	Universiade	Taipei, Taiwan	5th	1500 m	3:44.59
2018	European Championships	Berlin, Germany	25th (h)	1500 m	3:49.97
2021	European Indoor Championships	Toruń, Poland	14th (h)	1500 m	3:41.07
2021	Olympic Games	Tokyo, Japan	12th	1500 m	3:36.80
2022	World Indoor Championships	Belgrade, Serbia	21st (h)	1500 m	3:44.87
2022	World Championships	Eugene, United States	21st (sf)	1500 m	3:40.41
2022	European Championships	Munich, Germany	16th (h)	1500 m	3:40.33
2023	European Indoor Championships	Istanbul, Turkey	5th	3000 m	7:46.65
2023	Games of the Small States of Europe	Marsa, Malta	2nd	1500 m	3:42.37
2023	World Championships	Budapest, Hungary	19th (sf)	1500 m	3:36.11
2025	World Indoor Championships	Nanjing, China	5th (h)	1500 m	3:38.10
2025	World Championships	Tokyo, Japan	26th (h)	1500 m	3:41.18

== Personal bests ==
Outdoor

- 800 metres – 1:46.44 (Oordegem-Lede 2016)
- 1000 metres – 2:18.95 (Pliezhausen 2016)
- 1500 metres – 3:32.86 (Tokyo 2020) NR
- One mile- 3:53.20 (Oslo 2022) NR

Indoor

- 800 metres – 1:48.26 (Metz 2016)
- 1500 metres – 3:45.05 (Düsseldorf 2016)
