= Alexis Miellet =

French middle-distance runner

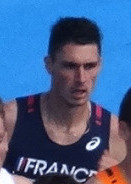

Personal information
- Born: 5 May 1995 (age 31) Dijon, France
- Education: University of Burgundy
- Height: 1.83 m (6 ft 0 in)
- Weight: 68 kg (150 lb)

Sport
- Sport: Athletics
- Event: 1500 metres
- Club: Dijon UC
- Coached by: Geoffroy Remy (2013-)
Medal record
Men's athletics
Representing France
Event	1st	2nd	3rd
European Championships	1	0	0
Total	1	0	0
Representing France
World Cross Country Championships
Silver medal – second place	2026 Tallahassee	Mixed relay
European Championships
Gold medal – first place	2024 Rome	3000 m steeplechase

Alexis Miellet (born 5 May 1995) is a French middle-distance runner specialising in the 1500 metres and the 3000 metres steeplechase. He is the 2024 European Champion in the 3000 metres steeplechase.

== International competitions ==
Year	Competition	Venue	Position	Event	Notes
Representing France
2014	World Junior Championships	Eugene, United States	8th	1500 m	3:45.28
2015	European U23 Championships	Tallinn, Estonia	9th	1500 m	3:46.57
2017	European U23 Championships	Bydgoszcz, Poland	9th	1500 m	3:51.05
2017	Universiade	Taipei, Taiwan	2nd	1500 m	3:43.91
2018	Mediterranean Games	Tarragona, Spain	4th	1500 m	3:38.04
2018	European Championships	Berlin, Germany	28th (h)	1500 m	3:51.61
2019	World Championships	Doha, Qatar	17th (sf)	1500 m	3:37.39
2021	Olympic Games	Tokyo, Japan	28th (h)	1500 m	3:41.23
2024	European Championships	Rome, Italy	1st	3000 m s'chase	8:14.01
2024	Olympic Games	Paris, France	17th (h)	3000 m s'chase	8:22.08
2026	European Championships	Birmingham, United Kingdom	18th (h)	3000 m s'chase	8:40.18

== Personal bests ==
- 400 metres – 49.92 (Chenove 2014)
- 800 metres – 1:45.88 (Marseille 2019)
- 1500 metres – 3:34.23 (Monaco 2019)
- 3000 metres – 7:52.35i (Metz 2024)
- 3000 metres steeplechase – 8:14.71 (Marseille 2024)
