= 2015 European Athletics U23 Championships – Men's 1500 metres =

The men's 1500 metres event at the 2015 European Athletics U23 Championships was held in Tallinn, Estonia, at Kadriorg Stadium on the 9th and 11th of July.

== Medalists ==
Gold	Marc Alcalá; Spain
Silver	Mohad Abdikadar Sheikh Ali; Italy
Bronze	Neil Gourley; Great Britain

== Results ==
=== Final ===
11 July

Rank	Name	Nationality	Time	Notes
1st place, gold medalist(s)	Marc Alcalá	Spain	3:44.54	
2nd place, silver medalist(s)	Mohad Abdikadar Sheikh Ali	Italy	3:44.91	
3rd place, bronze medalist(s)	Neil Gourley	Great Britain	3:45.04	
4	Joao Capistrano Mari Bussotti Neves Junior	Italy	3:45.10	
5	Andi Noot	Estonia	3:45.41	
6	Soufiane El Kabbouri	Italy	3:45.49	
7	Cameron Boyek	Great Britain	3:45.74	
8	Richard Douma	Netherlands	3:46.29	
9	Alexis Miellet	France	3:46.57	
10	Emanuel Rolim	Portugal	3:46.86	
11	Marius Probst	Germany	3:47.50	
12	Nikola Bursać	Serbia	3:49.00	

=== Heats ===
9 July

==== Heat 1 ====
Rank	Name	Nationality	Time	Notes
1	Marc Alcalá	Spain	3:43.40	Q
2	Joao Capistrano Mari Bussotti Neves Junior	Italy	3:43.60	Q
3	Soufiane El Kabbouri	Italy	3:43.65	Q
4	Alexis Miellet	France	3:43.77	Q
5	Cameron Boyek	Great Britain	3:44.00	q
6	Emanuel Rolim	Portugal	3:44.20	q
7	Andi Noot	Estonia	3:45.83	q
8	Benjamin Kovács	Hungary	3:46.06	
9	Uģis Jocis	Latvia	3:46.21	PB
10	Snorre Holtan Løken	Norway	3:46.94	
11	Nikolaus Franzmair	Austria	3:49.88	
12	Pieter Claus	Belgium	3:56.44	

==== Heat 2 ====
Rank	Name	Nationality	Time	Notes
1	Marius Probst	Germany	3:45.36	Q
2	Mohad Abdikadar Sheikh Ali	Italy	3:45.47	Q
3	Neil Gourley	Great Britain	3:45.48	Q
4	Richard Douma	Netherlands	3:45.54	Q
5	Nikola Bursać	Serbia	3:45.80	q
6	Süleyman Bekmezci	Turkey	3:45.85	
7	Paulo Rosário	Portugal	3:45.95	
8	Erik Udø Pedersen	Norway	3:46.11	
9	Piotr Drobnik	Poland	3:48.04	
10	Jan Petrač	Slovenia	3:49.21	
11	Sebastian Fischbach	Austria	3:53.46	

== Participation ==
According to an unofficial count, 23 athletes from 17 countries participated in the event.

- Austria (2)
- Belgium (1)
- Estonia (1)
- France (1)
- Germany (1)
- Great Britain (2)
- Hungary (1)
- Italy (3)
- Latvia (1)
- Netherlands (1)
- Norway (2)
- Poland (1)
- Portugal (2)
- Serbia (1)
- Slovenia (1)
- Spain (1)
- Turkey (1)
