= 2014 European Athletics Championships – Men's 1500 metres =

Men's 1500 metres at the European Athletics Championships

The men's 1500 metres at the 2014 European Athletics Championships took place at the Letzigrund on 15 and 17 August.

== Medalists ==
Gold	Mahiedine Mekhissi-Benabbad; France
Silver	Henrik Ingebrigtsen; Norway
Bronze	Chris O'Hare; Great Britain

== Records ==
Standing records prior to the 2014 European Athletics Championships
World record	Hicham El Guerrouj (MAR)	3:26.00	Rome, Italy	14 July 1998
European record	Mo Farah (GBR)	3:28.81	Monaco	19 July 2013
Championship record	Fermín Cacho (ESP)	3:35.27	Helsinki, Finland	9 August 1994
World Leading	Silas Kiplagat (KEN)	3:27.64	Monaco	18 July 2014
European Leading	Henrik Ingebrigtsen (NOR)	3:31.46	Monaco	18 July 2014

== Schedule ==
Date	Time	Round
15 August 2014	13:50	Round 1
17 August 2014	17:05	Final

All times are local times (UTC+2)

== Results ==
=== Round 1 ===
First 3 in each heat (Q) and 4 best performers (q) advance to the Semifinals. Soufiane El Kabbouri and David Bustos admitted to the final because damaged by Andreas Vojta.

Rank	Heat	Name	Nationality	Time	Note
1	2	Chris O'Hare	Great Britain	3:39.24	Q
2	1	Henrik Ingebrigtsen	Norway	3:39.32	Q
3	1	Charlie Grice	Great Britain	3:39.41	Q
4	1	Mahiedine Mekhissi-Benabbad	France	3:39.43	Q
5	1	Tarik Moukrime	Belgium	3:39.50	Q
6	1	Stanislav Maslov	Ukraine	3:39.63	q
7	1	Jakub Holuša	Czech Republic	3:39.64	q
7	2	Homiyu Tesfaye	Germany	3:39.64	Q
9	1	Ciarán Ó Lionáird	Ireland	3:39.79	q
10	2	Timo Benitz	Germany	3:39.83	Q
11	2	Paul Robinson	Ireland	3:39.83	Q
12	1	Florian Orth	Germany	3:39.99	q
13	2	İlham Tanui Özbilen	Turkey	3:40.09	
14	1	Pieter-Jan Hannes	Belgium	3:40.34	
15	2	Florian Carvalho	France	3:40.39	
16	2	Manuel Olmedo	Spain	3:40.48	
17	2	Filip Ingebrigtsen	Norway	3:41.06	
18	1	Goran Nava	Serbia	3:41.43	
19	2	Isaac Kimeli	Belgium	3:41.96	
20	2	Andreas Bueno	Denmark	3:42.06	
21	1	Emanuel Rolim	Portugal	3:42.22	
22	2	Jan Hochstrasser	Switzerland	3:43.89	
23	2	Dmitrijs Jurkevičs	Latvia	3:45.92	SB
24	1	Mohad Abdikadar Sheik Ali	Italy	3:46.07	
25	1	Adel Mechaal	Spain	3:47.60	
26	2	Jonas Leandersson	Sweden	3:49.64	
27	1	John Travers	Ireland	3:49.73	
28	1	Amine Khadiri	Cyprus	3:50.15	
29	2	Soufiane El Kabbouri	Italy	4:02.76	q
30	1	Kelvin Gomez	Gibraltar	4:05.71	
31	2	David Bustos	Spain	4:21.39	q
	2	Andreas Vojta	Austria	DSQ	

=== Final ===
Rank	Name	Nationality	Time	Note
1st place, gold medalist(s)	Mahiedine Mekhissi-Benabbad	France	3:45.60	
2nd place, silver medalist(s)	Henrik Ingebrigtsen	Norway	3:46.10	
3rd place, bronze medalist(s)	Chris O'Hare	Great Britain	3:46.18	
4	Paul Robinson	Ireland	3:46.35	
5	Homiyu Tesfaye	Germany	3:46.46	
6	David Bustos	Spain	3:46.92	
7	Timo Benitz	Germany	3:47.26	
8	Tarik Moukrime	Belgium	3:47.33	
9	Soufiane El Kabbouri	Italy	3:51.98	
10	Florian Orth	Germany	3:54.35	
11	Stanislav Maslov	Ukraine	3:54.59	
12	Charlie Grice	Great Britain	4:04.81	
	Ciarán Ó Lionáird	Ireland	DNF	
	Jakub Holuša	Czech Republic	DNS	
