= 2025 World Athletics Indoor Championships – Men's 1500 metres =

Men's 1500 metres at the 2025 World Athletics Indoor Championships
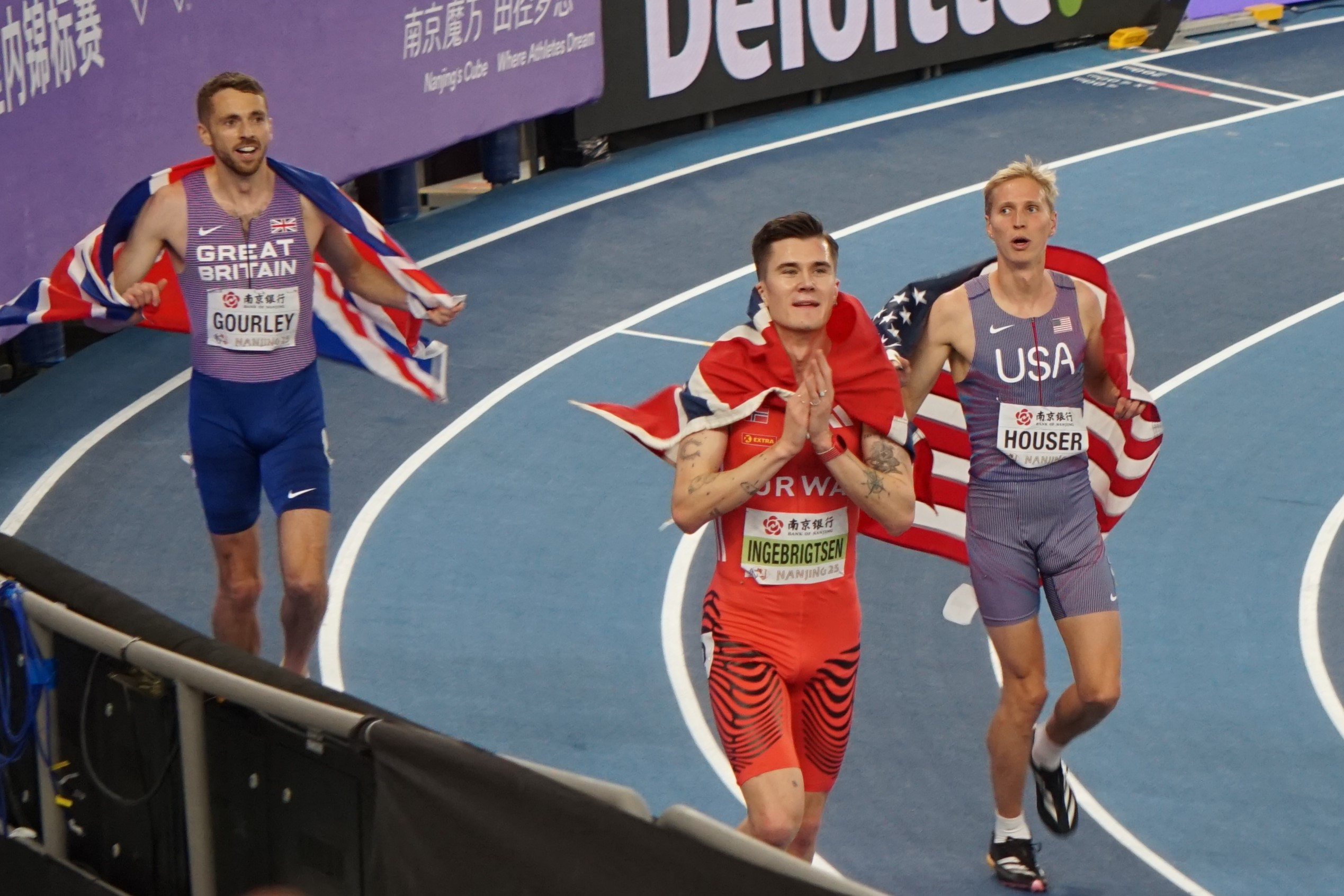
- The medalists after the final
- Venue: Nanjing's Cube at Nanjing Youth Olympic Sports Park
- Location: Nanjing, China
- Dates: 21 March (heats); 23 March (final)
- Winning time: 3:38.79

Medalists
gold medal	Jakob Ingebrigtsen	Norway
silver medal	Neil Gourley	Great Britain
bronze medal	Luke Houser	United States

The men's 1500 metres at the 2025 World Athletics Indoor Championships took place on the short track of the Nanjing's Cube at Nanjing Youth Olympic Sports Park in Nanjing, China on 21 and 23 March 2025. It was the 21st time the event was contested at the World Athletics Indoor Championships. Athletes qualified by achieving the entry standard or by their World Athletics Ranking in the event.

The heats took place on 21 March during the evening session. The final occurred on 23 March during the evening session.

== Background ==
The men's 1500 metres was contested 20 times before 2025, at every previous edition of the World Athletics Indoor Championships.

Records before the 2025 World Athletics Indoor Championships
Record	Athlete (nation)	Time (s)	Location	Date
World record	Jakob Ingebrigtsen (NOR)	3:29.63	Liévin, France	13 February 2025
Championship record	Samuel Tefera (ETH)	3:32.77	Belgrade, Serbia	20 March 2022
World leading	Jakob Ingebrigtsen (NOR)	3:29.63	Liévin, France	13 February 2025

== Qualification ==
For the men's 1500 metres, the qualification period ran from 1 September 2024 until 9 March 2025. Athletes qualified by achieving the entry standards of 3:33.50, or 3:50.50 in the mile. Athletes were also able to qualify by virtue of their World Athletics Ranking for the event or by virtue of their World Athletics Indoor Tour wildcard. There was a target number of 30 athletes.

== Results ==
=== Heats ===
The heats took place on 21 March, starting at 19:18 (UTC+8). The first 2 of each heat (Q) plus 1 fastest time (q) qualified for the final.

==== Heat 1 ====
Place	Athlete	Nation	Time	Notes
1	Neil Gourley	Great Britain	3:36.60	Q
2	Samuel Prakel	United States	3:36.93	Q
3	Adrián Ben	Spain	3:36.95	q, PB
4	Ruben Verheyden	Belgium	3:37.94	
5	Charles Grethen	Luxembourg	3:38.10	
6	Filip Sasínek	Czech Republic	3:40.86	

==== Heat 2 ====
Place	Athlete	Nation	Time	Notes
1	Jakob Ingebrigtsen	Norway	3:39.80	Q
2	Raphael Pallitsch	Austria	3:40.08	Q
3	Andrew Coscoran	Ireland	3:40.79	
4	Joao Bussotti	Italy	3:40.92	
5	Foster Malleck	Canada	3:42.55	
6	Seyed Amir Zamanpour	Iran	3:43.37	NR
7	Aarón Hernández	El Salvador	3:57.77	PB

==== Heat 3 ====
Place	Athlete	Nation	Time	Notes
1	Luke Houser	United States	3:41.16	Q
2	Samuel Pihlström	Sweden	3:42.21	Q
3	Olli Hoare	Australia	3:42.29	
4	Kieran Lumb	Canada	3:42.32	
5	Liu Dezhu	China	3:43.55	SB
6	Uģis Jocis	Latvia	3:50.27	
7	Hugh Kent	Guam	4:07.37	PB

==== Heat 4 ====
Place	Athlete	Nation	Time	Notes
1	Mariano García	Spain	4:02.68	Q
2	Isaac Nader	Portugal	4:02.75	Q
3	Festus Lagat	Kenya	4:02.99	
4	Anass Essayi	Morocco	4:04.16	
5	Melese Nberet	Ethiopia	4:05.04	
6	Adam Fogg	Great Britain	4:06.02	

=== Final ===
The final took place on 23 March, starting at 20:15 (UTC+8).

Place	Athlete	Nation	Time	Notes
1st place, gold medalist(s)	Jakob Ingebrigtsen	Norway	3:38.79	
2nd place, silver medalist(s)	Neil Gourley	Great Britain	3:39.07	
3rd place, bronze medalist(s)	Luke Houser	United States	3:39.17	
4	Isaac Nader	Portugal	3:39.58	
5	Samuel Pihlström	Sweden	3:39.67	
6	Adrián Ben	Spain	3:39.96	
7	Raphael Pallitsch	Austria	3:41.01	
8	Mariano García	Spain	3:41.83	
9	Samuel Prakel	United States	3:44.48	
