= Timo Benitz =

German middle-distance runner

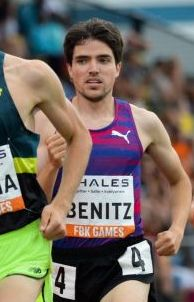
- Timo Benitz in 2017

Personal information
- Born: 24 December 1991 (age 34) Engen, Germany
- Height: 1.74 m (5 ft 9 in)
- Weight: 60 kg (132 lb)

Sport
- Sport: Athletics
- Event(s): 800 m, 1500 m
- Club: LG Farbtex Nordschwarzwald
- Coached by: Jörg Müller
Medal record
Men's athletics
Representing Germany
Gold medal – first place	2017 Taipei	1500 m

Timo Benitz (born 24 December 1991 in Engen) is a German middle-distance runner competing primarily in the 1500 metres. He took a surprise victory in the 800 metres at the 2014 European Team Championships in Braunschweig where in front of home crowd he beat among others Adam Kszczot and Pierre-Ambroise Bosse. In 2017 he competed at the World Championships reaching the semifinals and later won the gold medal at the 2017 Summer Universiade.

== International competitions ==
Year	Competition	Venue	Position	Event	Notes
Representing Germany
2010	World Junior Championships	Moncton, Canada	32nd (h)	1500 m	3:50.47
2011	European U23 Championships	Ostrava, Czech Republic	6th	1500 m	3:51.76
2013	European U23 Championships	Tampere, Finland	5th	1500 m	3:45.38
2014	European Championships	Zürich, Switzerland	7th	1500 m	3:47.26
2016	European Championships	Amsterdam, Netherlands	12th (h)	1500 m	3:42.40
2017	European Indoor Championships	Belgrade, Serbia	7th	1500 m	3:46.73
2017	World Championships	London, United Kingdom	23rd (sf)	1500 m	3:44.38
2017	Universiade	Taipei, Taiwan	1st	1500 m	3:43.45
2018	European Championships	Berlin, Germany	7th	1500 m	3:39.28

== Personal bests ==
Outdoor

- 800 metres – 1:46.24 (Braunschweig 2014)
- 1000 metres – 2:16.90 (Pliezhausen 2014)
- 1500 metres – 3:34.94 (Dessau 2014)

Indoor

- 3000 metres – 8:02.62 (Leipzig 2014)
