= Abderrahmane Anou =

Algerian middle-distance runner

Personal information
- Born: 29 January 1991 (age 35)

Sport
- Sport: Athletics
- Event: 1500 metres

Abderrahmane Anou (born 29 January 1991) is an Algerian middle-distance runner who competes primarily in the 1500 metres. He represented his country at the 2017 World Championships without advancing to the semifinals. He also won a silver medal at the 2010 World Junior Championships.

== International competitions ==
Year	Competition	Venue	Position	Event	Notes
Representing Algeria
2010	World Junior Championships	Moncton, Canada	2nd	1500 m	3:38.86
2011	Arab Championships	Al Ain, United Arab Emirates	1st	1500 m	3:58.78
2011	Pan Arab Games	Doha, Qatar	4th (h)	1500 m	3:47.92^{1}
2013	Mediterranean Games	Mersin, Turkey	4th	1500 m	3:36.93
2013	Islamic Solidarity Games	Palembang, Indonesia	4th	1500 m	3:41.33
2017	Arab Championships	Radès, Tunisia	3rd	1500 m	3:52.51
2017	World Championships	London, United Kingdom	35th (h)	1500 m	3:47.38

^{1}Did not finish in the final

== Personal bests ==
Outdoors

- 800 metres – 1:47.81 (La Roche-sur-Yon 2013)
- 1000 metres – 2:17.92 (Nancy 2015)
- 1500 metres – 3:35.2 (Algiers 2011)
- 3000 metres – 7:52.54 (Sotteville 2015)
- 3000 metres steeplechase – 8:51.59 (Sotteville 2016)
- 10 kilometres – 28:47 (Barcelona 2016)

'Indoors

- 1500 metres – 3:40.88 (Reims 20117)
- 3000 metres – 7:58.50 (Metz 2017)
