= Peter Callahan =

Belgian-American middle-distance runner

Personal information
- Nationality: Belgian; American
- Born: June 1, 1991 (age 35) Evanston, Illinois, U.S.

Sport
- Sport: Track
- Events: 1500 meters, mile
- College team: Princeton '13; New Mexico '15
- Club: Royal Excelsior Sports Club of Brussels
- Turned pro: 2015

Achievements and titles
- Personal best: 1500 meters: 3:36.15 Mile: 3:55.77 800 meters: 1:47.92
- Updated on July 17, 2021

Peter Wirtz Callahan (born June 1, 1991) is a Belgian-American middle-distance runner. He is a Belgian National Champion over 1500m, an NCAA Champion in the DMR, and a four-time NCAA All-American. Callahan competed for Belgium at both the 2016 and 2018 European Athletics Championship in Amsterdam and Berlin respectively and also raced for the national team at the 2017 European Team Championships in Vaasa, Finland. In the course of his collegiate career, he first studied and ran at Princeton University before going to University of New Mexico.

== Running career ==
=== High school ===
Callahan attended and ran at North Shore Country Day School, where he was coached by Patrick McHugh. By the time he graduated in the summer of 2009, he recorded personal bests of 1:51.22 in the 800 meters and 4:05.20 in the mile.

Callahan won three Illinois High School Association 1A state titles in (2008 - 4:20.52, 2009 - 4:15.30) 1600 meters. and (2009 - 1:51.22) 800 meters.

=== Collegiate ===
Callahan first attended and ran at Princeton University, where he graduated in 2013. While at Princeton, he was coached by Steve Dolan and Jason Vigilante and set the school record in the indoor 1,000 meters at 2:20.78. He first broke four minutes for the mile in the winter of his Junior year at Princeton with a time of 3:58.86 at the Sykes-Sabock Invitational at Penn State University.

Callahan earned 7 Ivy League titles, 1 NCAA Division I Indoor Track title as a part of the Distance Medley team and 1 All-America at Princeton University.

Due to skipping two seasons from multiple injuries, he got fifth year NCAA eligibility when he enrolled in a graduate program at University of New Mexico.

While at University of New Mexico, Callahan placed fourth in the NCAA outdoor men's 1500 meters finals for two consecutive years, in 2014 and 2015. Callahan earned a Mountain West Conference Outdoor Track 1500 meter title.

Callahan finished a graduate degree in Master of Science in geography (Concentration in Environmental Studies) from University of New Mexico.

Year	Competition	Venue	Position	Event	Notes
Representing the Princeton Tigers
2010	Heptagonal Indoor; Track and Field	Dartmouth College	1st	4 × 800 m	7:37.98
2010	Heptagonal Indoor; Track and Field	Dartmouth College	1st	800 m	1:52.18
2010	Heptagonal Outdoor; Track and Field	Princeton University	3rd	4 × 800 m	7:36.41
2010	Heptagonal Outdoor; Track and Field	Princeton University	10th	800 m	1:52.91
2011	Heptagonal Indoor; Track and Field	Fort Washington Avenue Armory	2nd	4 × 800 m	7:29.29
2011	Heptagonal Indoor; Track and Field	Fort Washington Avenue Armory	1st	1000 m	2:22.94
2012	Heptagonal Indoor; Track and Field	Cornell University	2nd	DMR	9:54.11
2012	Heptagonal Indoor; Track and Field	Cornell University	1st	800 m	1:49.72
2012	NCAA Indoor; Track and Field	Boise State University	6th	Mile	4:02.66
2013	Heptagonal Indoor; Track and Field	Harvard University	1st	DMR	9:52.72
2013	Heptagonal Indoor; Track and Field	Harvard University	1st	Mile	4:19.90
2013	NCAA Indoor; Track and Field	University of Arkansas	1st	DMR	9:33.01
2013	Heptagonal Outdoor; Track and Field	Princeton University	1st	1500 m	3:49.74
2013	Heptagonal Outdoor; Track and Field	Princeton University	2nd	4 × 800 m	7:25.82
Representing the New Mexico Lobos
2014	MWC Outdoor; Track and Field	University of Wyoming	3rd	800 m	1:51.93
2014	MWC Outdoor; Track and Field	University of Wyoming	1st	1500 m	3:58.81
2014	NCAA Outdoor; Track and Field	University of Oregon	4th	1500 m	3:39.90
2015	MWC Outdoor; Track and Field	San Diego State University	9th	800 m	1:51.71
2015	MWC Outdoor; Track and Field	San Diego State University	3rd	1500 m	3:52.96
2015	NCAA Outdoor; Track and Field	University of Oregon	4th	1500 m	3:55.22

=== Post-collegiate ===
Callahan made an appearance as a professional rabbit in the 2015 Diamond League men's 3000 meters. In May 2016, the IAAF approved Callahan to represent Belgium in international competition. He was eligible to represent Belgium due to his mother having been born in Antwerp.

The approval happened amidst a race campaign in hopes of qualifying for the 2016 Summer Olympics. His first international competition after his IAAF-mandated switch was the 2016 European Athletics Championships, where he raced in the men's 1500 meters in a time of 3:41.75. He did not progress into the finals. He did not qualify for the Olympics in 2016, having not satisfied the 3:36.19 Olympic "A" standard for the men's 1500 meters. His closest result was at the 2016 Swarthmore Final Qualifier, where he ran the 1500 in 3:37.87, placing seventh. On July 22, 2016, Callahan raced in the men's mile at the 2016 Morton Games in Dublin, Ireland, where he finished in 3:56.14 for fourth place.

Callahan placed first at 2017 European Team Championships in the 1500 meters.

Callahan placed fourth in the 1500 meters in 3:54.71 at the 2018 Belgium Athletics Championship on July 8.

Callahan placed eighth in the first heat (30th overall) at 2018 European Athletics Championships in the 1500 meters.

Seconds Away is an athlete documentary directed by Benjamin Kegan that follows Peter Callahan and his longtime coach, Patrick McHugh, during the process of training for the qualifications to the Tokyo 2020 Summer Olympics. Callahan failed to qualify by 1.15 seconds.

Year	Competition	Venue	Position	Event	Notes
Representing Belgium
2018	2018 European Athletics Championships	Berlin	30th	1500 meters	3:54.23
2017	2017 European Team Championships	Lille, France	1st	1500 meters	3:59.09
2016	2016 European Athletics Championships	Amsterdam	14th	1500 meters	3:41.75
Belgian Athletics Championships
2021	Belgian Athletics Championships	Brussels	1st	1500 meters	3:40.51
2018	Belgian Athletics Championships	Brussels	4th	1500 meters	3:54.71
2017	Belgian Athletics Championships	Brussels	2nd	800 meters	1:49.48
Representing United States
2010	2010 World Junior Championships	Moncton, New Brunswick, Canada	14th	1500 meters	3:45.04
USA Outdoor Track and Field Championships
2010	USA Junior U 20 Track and Field Championships	Drake Stadium (Drake University); Des Moines, Iowa	1st	1500 meters	3:46.42

=== Coaching ===
Northwestern University has added four-time All-American Peter Callahan as a women's cross country coach under head coach 'A Havahla Haynes February 2018. Callahan, the Evanston native attended North Shore Country Day School in Winnetka, Illinois.

University of Chicago has added four-time All-American Peter Callahan as an assistant cross country coach under head coach Chris Hall
