= Neil Gourley =

Scottish runner (born 1995)

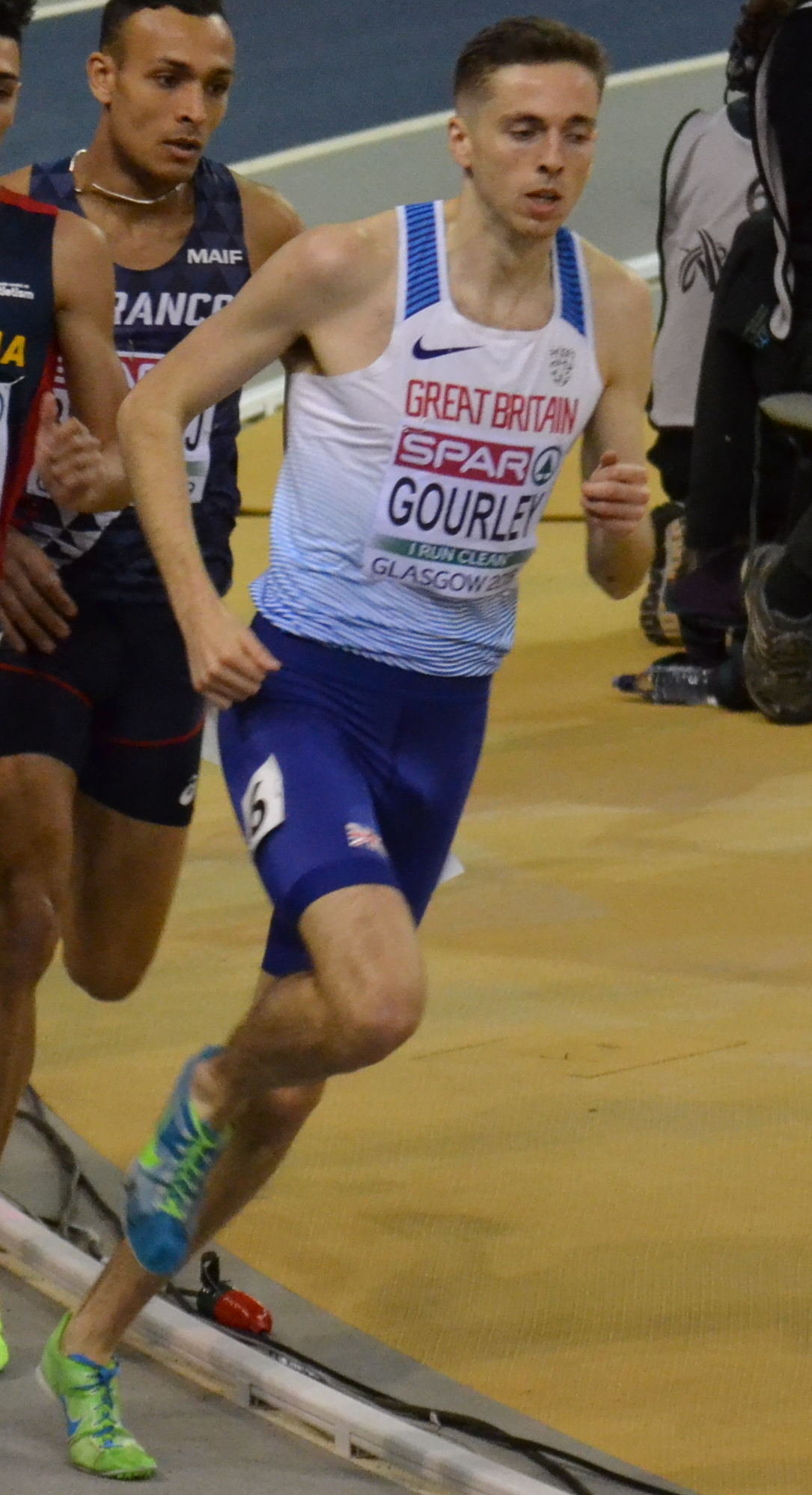
- Neil Gourley in 2019

Personal information
- Born: 7 February 1995 (age 31) Glasgow, Scotland
- Education: Virginia Tech

Sport
- Sport: Athletics
- Event: 1500 metres
- College team: Virginia Tech Hokies
- Club: Giffnock North Athletics Club
- Coached by: Mark Rowland (2019–); Ben Thomas (2013–2018); Gordon Lockie (–2013)
Medal record
Men's athletics
Representing Great Britain
World Indoor Championships
| Silver medal – second place | 2025 Nanjing | 1500 m |
European Indoor Championships
| Silver medal – second place | 2023 Istanbul | 1500 m |
World Cup
| Bronze medal – third place | 2018 London | 1500 m |
European U23 Championships
| Bronze medal – third place | 2015 Tallinn | 1500 m |

Neil Gourley (born 7 February 1995) is a Scottish middle-distance runner specialising in the 1500 metres. He won the silver medal in the event at both the 2025 World Athletics Indoor Championships and the 2023 European Indoor Championships and bronze at the 2015 European Under-23 Championships.

Gourley is the European indoor record holder for the mile and the British indoor record holder for the 1500 m. He is a three-time national champion (1500 m).

== Career ==
Neil Gourley won the bronze medal in the 1500 metres at the 2015 European Under-23 Championships.

He competed collegiately for the Virginia Tech Hokies, where in 2018 he anchored the men's distance medley relay team to an NCAA championship title.

In 2019, Gourley reached the final of his specialist event in front of the home crowd at the European Indoor Championships in Glasgow but was unable to compete in it due an illness. In August 2019, he became the British 1500 metres champion after winning the title at the 2019 British Athletics Championships.

On 25 February 2023, the 28-year-old broke Josh Kerr's British indoor 1500 m record with a time of 3:32.48 for a win at the World Indoor Tour Final in Birmingham, replacing him at No.8 on the respective world all-time list. Gourley's success secured him also overall 1500 m World Indoor Tour victory, after his mile win in Boston, MA and runner-up mile finish in New York, NY (with a European indoor record over the distance) earlier that month. In March, he claimed the silver medal in his signature event at the European Indoor Championships in Istanbul behind only Jakob Ingebrigtsen, 3:34.23 to 3:33.95.

Later that year in May, Gourley opened his outdoor season with a 5000m personal best of 13:16.

After winning the 1500 metres gold medal at the 2024 British Athletics Championships, Gourley was subsequently named in the Great Britain team for the 2024 Summer Olympics where he finished 10th in the final.

In Birmingham on 15 February 2025, he broke the British men's indoor 1000m record in a time of two minutes 16.74 seconds. Later in August he won his fourth British outdoor title at the 2025 UK Athletics Championships.

== Achievements ==
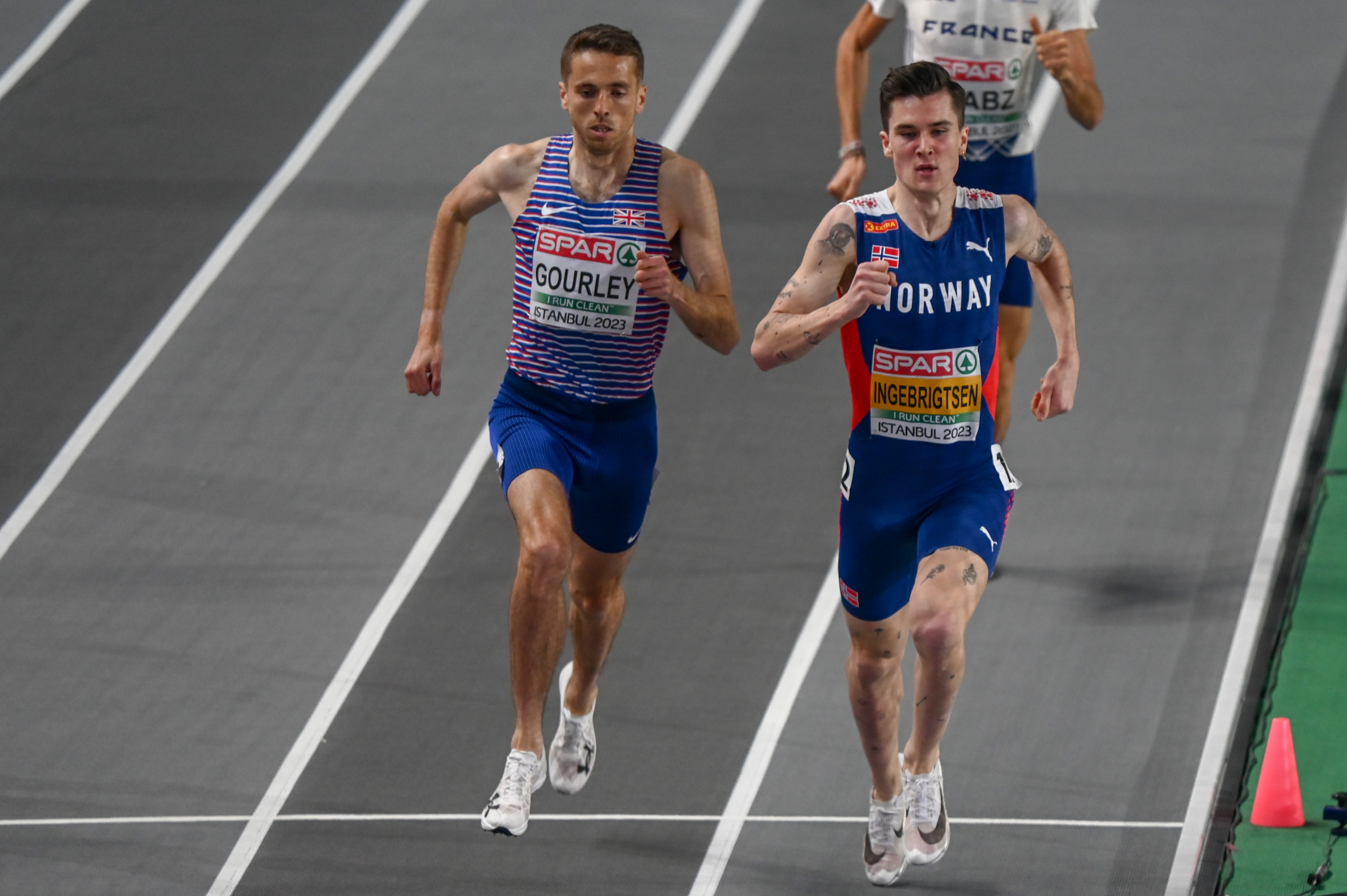
Gourley (L) took silver in the 1500 m behind Jakob Ingebrigtsen (R) at the 2023 European Indoor Championships in Istanbul.

=== International competitions ===
Representing Great Britain / Scotland
| Year | Competition | Venue | Position | Event | Time |
|---|---|---|---|---|---|
| 2015 | European U23 Championships | Tallinn, Estonia | 3rd | 1500 m | 3:45.04 |
| 2017 | European U23 Championships | Bydgoszcz, Poland | 4th | 1500 m | 3:49.53 |
| 2018 | World Cup | London, United Kingdom | 3rd | 1500 m | 3:53.24 |
| 2019 | European Indoor Championships | Glasgow, United Kingdom | 8th (h) | 1500 m | 3:46.63^{1} |
| 2019 | World Championships | Doha, Qatar | 11th | 1500 m | 3:37.30 |
| 2021 | European Indoor Championships | Toruń, Poland | 12th | 1500 m | 3:45.99 |
| 2022 | World Indoor Championships | Belgrade, Serbia | 6th | 1500 m | 3:35.87 |
| 2022 | World Championships | Eugene, OR, United States | 14th (sf) | 1500 m | 3:37.22 |
| 2022 | European Championships | Munich, Germany | 8th | 1500 m | 3:38.40 |
| 2023 | European Indoor Championships | Istanbul, Turkey | 2nd | 1500 m | 3:34.23 |
| 2023 | World Championships | Budapest, Hungary | 9th | 1500 m | 3:31.10 |
| 2024 | European Championships | Rome, Italy | 9th | 1500 m | 3:34.11 |
| 2024 | Olympic Games | Paris, France | 10th | 1500 m | 3:30.88 |
| 2025 | European Indoor Championships | Apeldoorn, Netherlands | 4th | 1500 m | 3:38.29 |
| 2025 | World Indoor Championships | Nanjing, China | 2nd | 1500 m | 3:39.07 |
| 2025 | World Championships | Tokyo, Japan | 10th | 1500 m | 3:35.56 |
| 2026 | Commonwealth Games | Glasgow, United Kingdom | 16th (h) | Mile | 4:01.45 |

^{1}Did not start in the final

=== Personal bests ===
- 800 metres – 1:44.82 (Pfungstadt 2022)
  - 800 metres indoor – 1:47.04 (Clemson, SC 2018)
  - 1000 metres indoor – 2:18.68 (Blacksburg, VA 2021)
- 1500 metres – 3:30.60 (London 2023)
  - 1500 metres indoor – 3:32.48 (Birmingham 2023) NR
- One mile – 3:47.74 (Eugene 2024)
  - One mile indoor – 3:49.46 (New York, NY 2023) European record
  - 3000 metres indoor – 7:48.94 (Fayetteville, AR 2022)
- 5000 metres – 13:11.44 (Los Angeles, CA 2023)
  - 5000 metres indoor – 13:16.24 (Boston, MA 2022)

=== Circuit performances ===
Grand Slam Track results
| Slam | Race group | Event | Pl. | Time | Prize money |
|---|---|---|---|---|---|
| 2025 Kingston Slam | Short distance | 1500 m | 4th | 3:35.60 | US$20,000 |
| 2025 Kingston Slam | Short distance | 800 m | 4th | 1:47.84 | US$20,000 |

==== Wins and titles ====
- World Athletics Indoor Tour 1500 m overall winner: 2023
  - 2023: Boston New Balance Indoor Grand Prix (Mile), Birmingham World Indoor Tour Final (1500m, NR)

=== National titles ===
- British Athletics Championships
  - 1500 metres: 2019
- British Indoor Athletics Championships
  - 1500 metres: 2019, 2023
