= 2011 World Youth Championships in Athletics – Boys' 1500 metres =

Boys' 1500 metres at the 2011 World Youth Championships in Athletics
- Venue: Stadium Lille Métropole
- Dates: 7 July (heats); 10 July (final)
- Competitors: 33
- Winning time: 3:39.13 PB

Medalists
gold medal	Teshome Dirirsa	Ethiopia
silver medal	Vincent Kiprotich Mutai	Kenya
bronze medal	Jonathan Kiplimo Sawe	Kenya

The boys' 1500 metres at the 2011 World Youth Championships in Athletics was held at the Stadium Lille Métropole on 7 and 10 of July.

== Medalists ==
Gold	Silver	Bronze
Teshome Dirirsa; Ethiopia	Vincent Kiprotich Mutai; Kenya	Jonathan Kiplimo Sawe; Kenya

== Records ==
Prior to the competition, the following records were as follows.

World Youth Best	Nicholas Kiptanui Kemboi (KEN)	3:33.72	Zurich, Switzerland	18 August 2006
Championship Record	Isaac Kiprono Songok (KEN)	3:36.78	Debrecen, Hungary	15 July 2001
World Youth Leading	Geoffrey Barusei (KEN)	3:35.54	Gaborone, Botswana	13 May 2011

== Heats ==
Qualification rule: first 3 of each heat (Q) plus the 3 fastest times (q) qualified.

=== Heat 1 ===
Rank	Name	Nationality	Time	Notes
1	Jonathan Kiplimo Sawe	Kenya	3:48.35	Q
2	Robbie Farnham-Rose	Great Britain	3:50.89	Q
3	Lorenzo Dini	Italy	3:52.14	Q, PB
4	Ruairí Finnegan	Ireland	3:52.60	q
5	Dominik Czaja	Poland	3:53.84	
6	Abderahmane Adami	Algeria	3:57.24	PB
7	Harish Singh Koranga	India	3:57.83	PB
8	Marc Alcalá	Spain	3:58.50	
9	Leonel Cesar	Argentina	4:01.20	
10	Dániel Kilian	Hungary	4:01.37	
11	Bob Bertemes	Luxembourg	4:26.73	

=== Heat 2 ===
Rank	Name	Nationality	Time	Notes
1	Vincent Kiprotich Mutai	Kenya	3:47.66	Q
2	Fayidu Murad	Ethiopia	3:48.00	Q
3	James McMurray	Great Britain	3:50.16	Q, PB
4	Son Myeong-jun	South Korea	3:53.05	PB
5	Edgar Alan Garcia	Mexico	3:55.61	
6	Benjamin Flanagan	Canada	3:55.95	
7	Shane Fitzsimons	Ireland	3:57.18	
8	Oleksandr Karpenko	Ukraine	3:58.60	PB
9	Ignacio Diaz-Cano	Spain	3:59.05	
10	Edwin Haroldo Pirir	Guatemala	4:05.34	
11	Omer Almog	Israel	4:07.11	

=== Heat 3 ===
Rank	Name	Nationality	Time	Notes
1	Teshome Dirirsa	Ethiopia	3:45.32	Q
2	Yonas Habtemicael	Eritrea	3:50.40	Q
3	Emilio Perco	Italy	3:51.20	Q, PB
4	Jacob Burcham	United States	3:51.22	q, PB
5	Hocine Khelif	Algeria	3:52.77	q, PB
6	Alexander Freemantle	Canada	3:56.56	
7	Fouad Gares	Tunisia	3:57.28	
8	Ivan Malić	Croatia	4:00.89	
9	Alexandre Saddedine	France	4:03.60	
10	Jan Petrac	Slovenia	4:09.19	
11	Azham Waheed	Maldives	4:29.12	PB

== Final ==
Rank	Name	Nationality	Time	Notes
1st place, gold medalist(s)	Teshome Dirirsa	Ethiopia	3:39.19	PB
2nd place, silver medalist(s)	Vincent Kiprotich Mutai	Kenya	3:39.17	PB
3rd place, bronze medalist(s)	Jonathan Kiplimo Sawe	Kenya	3:39.54	
4	Fayidu Murad	Ethiopia	3:40.60	
5	Yonas Habtemicael	Eritrea	3:43.89	PB
6	James McMurray	Great Britain	3:46.51	PB
7	Jacob Burcham	United States	3:46.55	PB
8	Robbie Farnham-Rose	Great Britain	3:47.60	PB
9	Lorenzo Dini	Italy	3:48.40	PB
10	Ruairí Finnegan	Ireland	3:49.58	PB
11	Hocine Khelif	Algeria	3:51.24	PB
12	Emilio Perco	Italy	4:11.11	
