= Joao Bussotti =

Mozambican and Italian middle-distance runner

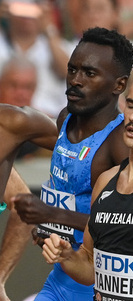
- Bussotti Neves in 2023

Personal information
- Full name: João Capistrano Maria Bussotti Neves Júnior
- Nationality: Mozambican and Italian
- Born: 10 May 1993 (age 33) Maputo, Mozambique
- Education: University of Pisa
- Height: 1.80 m (5 ft 11 in)
- Weight: 60 kg (132 lb)

Sport
- Country: Italy
- Sport: Athletics
- Event: 1500 metres
- Club: G.S. Esercito
- Coached by: Saverio Marconi

Achievements and titles
- Personal bests: 800 m. 1:47.55 (2014); 1500 m: 3:37.12 (2017)

João Capistrano Maria Bussotti Neves Júnior (born 10 May 1993) is a Mozambican and Italian middle-distance runner competing primarily in the 1500 metres. He won five times the national championships.

== Career ==
Of Mozambican and later acquired Italian citizenship, Bussotti Neves emigrated to Italy with his mother Claudine in 2002. His step father is from Livorno where Joao lives and trains. He took up athletics in 2007. He was cleared by IAAF to compete for Italy since May 2012.

== Personal bests ==
Outdoor

- 800 metres – 1:47.55 (Orvieto 2016)
- 1500 metres – 3:37.12 (Marseille 2017)

Indoor

- 1500 metres – 3:42.82 (Prague 2015)

== International competitions ==
Year	Competition	Venue	Position	Event	Notes
Representing Italy
2012	World Junior Championships	Barcelona, Spain	20th (h)	1500 m	3:49.37
2015	European Indoor Championships	Prague, Czech Republic	7th (h)	1500 m	3:42.82
2015	European U23 Championships	Tallinn, Estonia	4th	1500 m	3:45.10
2016	European Championships	Amsterdam, Netherlands	12th	1500 m	3:50.43
2017	World Cross Country Championships	Kampala, Uganda	10th	4x2 km mixed relay	25:14
2017	Universiade	Taipei, Taiwan	12th (h)	1500 m	3:46.89
2018	Mediterranean Games	Tarragona, Spain	8th	1500 m	3:42.34
2018	European Championships	Berlin, Germany	11th	1500 m	3:41.31
2021	European Indoor Championships	Toruń, Poland	37th (h)	1500 m	3:44.76
2023	World Championships	Budapest, Hungary	55th (h)	1500 m	3:48.55
2025	World Indoor Championships	Nanjing, China	10th (h)	1500 m	3:40.92
2025	World Championships	Tokyo, Japan	20th (h)	1500 m	3:38.38
2026	European Championships	Birmingham, United Kingdom	11th (h)	1500 m	3:39.01
2026	Mediterranean Games	Taranto, Italy	7th	1500 m	3:43.96

== National titles ==
Bussotti won five national championships.

- Italian Athletics Championships
  - 1500 metres: 2017, 2018, 2020 (3)
- Italian Indoor Athletics Championships
  - 800 metres: 2015
  - 1500 metres: 2015

== See also ==
- Naturalized athletes of Italy
