= 2016 European Athletics Championships – Men's 1500 metres =

Men's 1500 metres at the 2016 European Athletics Championships
- Venue: Olympic Stadium
- Location: Amsterdam
- Dates: July 7 (heats); July 9 (final)
- Competitors: 37 from 20 nations
- Winning time: 3:46.65

Medalists
gold medal	Filip Ingebrigtsen	Norway
silver medal	David Bustos	Spain
bronze medal	Henrik Ingebrigtsen	Norway

The men's 1500 metres at the 2016 European Athletics Championships took place at the Olympic Stadium on 7 and 9 July. The gold medal was won by Filip Ingebrigtsen from Norway while David Bustos from Spain won silver and Henrik Ingebrigtsen, older brother of Filip, won bronze medal.

== Records ==
Standing records prior to the 2016 European Athletics Championships
World record	Hicham El Guerrouj (MAR)	3:26.00	Rome, Italy	14 July 1998
European record	Mo Farah (GBR)	3:28.81	Monaco	19 July 2013
Championship record	Fermín Cacho (ESP)	3:35.27	Helsinki, Finland	9 August 1994
World Leading	Asbel Kiprop (KEN)	3:29.33	Birmingham, United Kingdom	5 June 2016
European Leading	Homiyu Tesfaye (GER)	3:35.05	Rabat, Morocco	22 May 2016

== Schedule ==
Date	Time	Round
7 July 2016	18:25	Round 1
9 July 2016	21:50	Final

All times are local times (UTC+2)

== Results ==
=== Round 1 ===
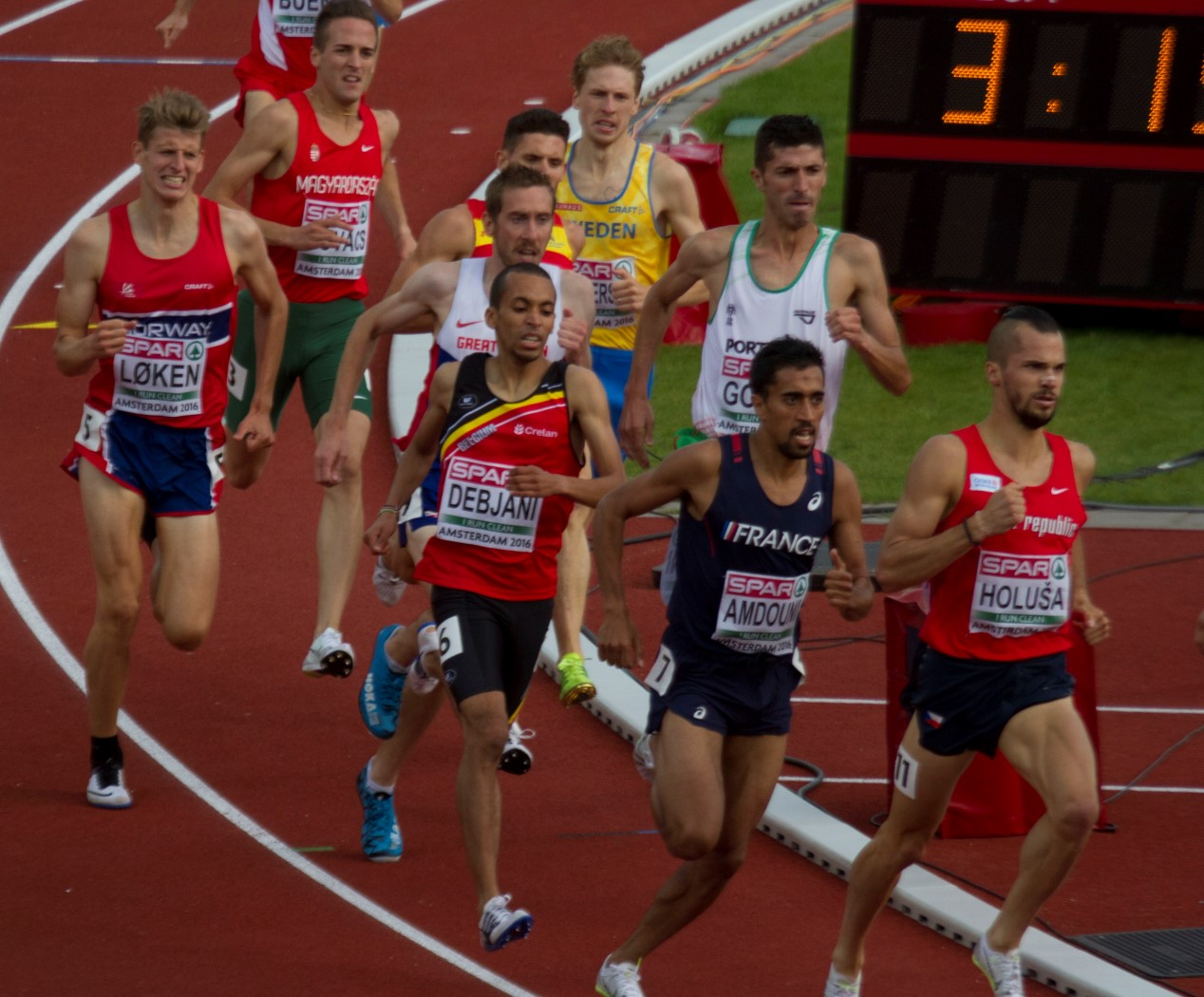
Heat 2

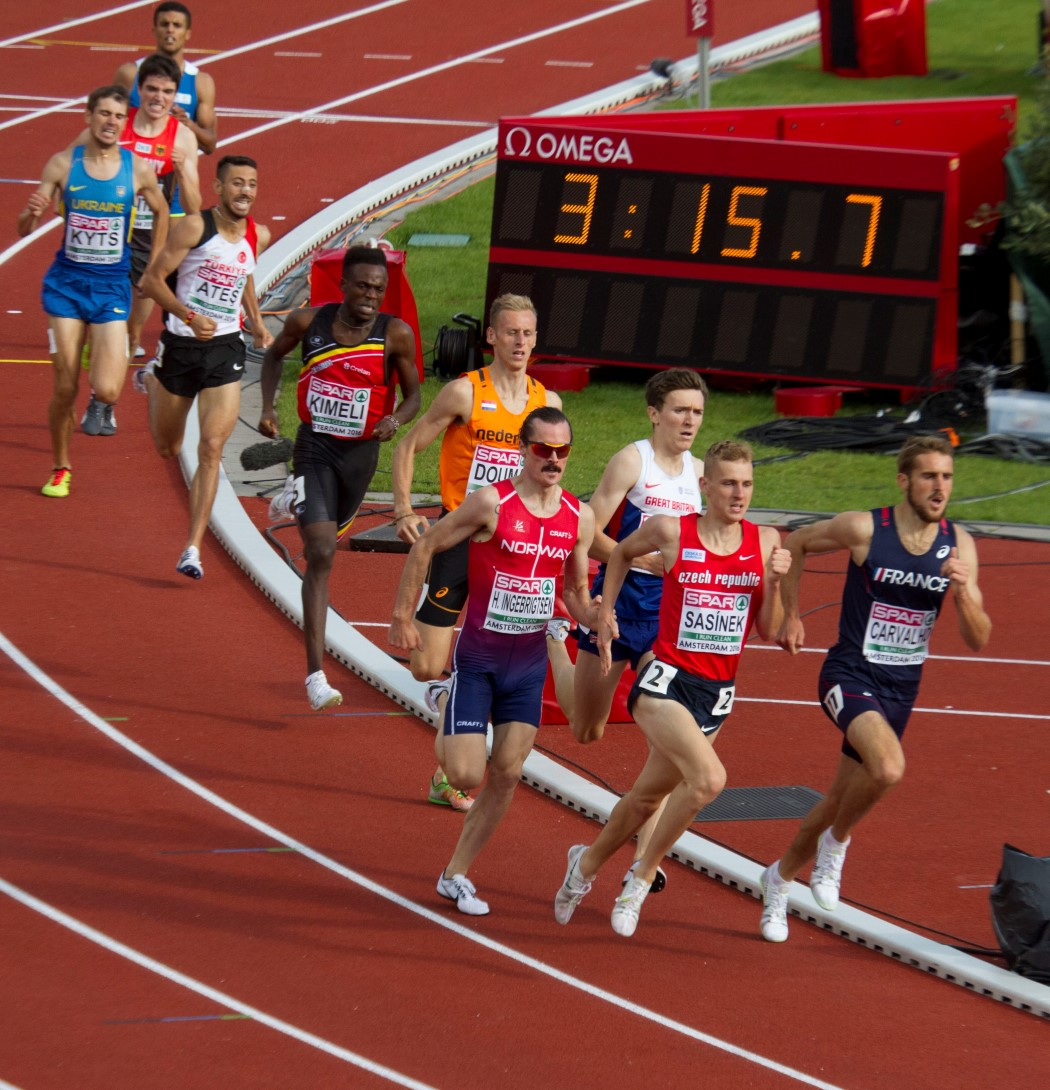
Heat 3

First 3 (Q) and next 3 fastest (q) qualify for the final.

Rank	Heat	Name	Nationality	Time	Note
1	3	Jake Wightman	Great Britain	3:39.32	Q
2	3	Henrik Ingebrigtsen	Norway	3:39.66	Q
3	3	Florian Carvalho	France	3:39.73	Q
4	3	Filip Sasínek	Czech Republic	3:39.77	q
5	3	Richard Douma	Netherlands	3:39.80	q
6	1	Filip Ingebrigtsen	Norway	3:40.23	Q
7	1	Homiyu Tesfaye	Germany	3:40.44	Q
8	1	David Bustos	Spain	3:40.60	Q
9	3	Isaac Kimeli	Belgium	3:41.25	q
10	1	Peter Callahan	Belgium	3:41.75	
11	1	Tom Lancashire	Great Britain	3:42.08	
12	3	Timo Benitz	Germany	3:42.40	
13	2	Ismael Debjani	Belgium	3:42.62	Q
14	2	Mourad Amdouni	France	3:42.64	Q
15	1	Mohad Abdikadar Sheikh Ali	Italy	3:42.91	
16	2	Lee Emanuel	Great Britain	3:42.92	Q
17	2	Snorre Holtan Løken	Norway	3:42.97	
18	1	Petr Vitner	Czech Republic	3:43.22	
19	3	Levent Ates	Turkey	3:43.25	
20	2	Marc Alcalá	Spain	3:43.43	
21	2	Dmitrijs Jurkevics	Latvia	3:43.44	
22	3	Volodymyr Kyts	Ukraine	3:43.58	
23	1	Bryan Cantero	France	3:43.65	
24	2	Jonas Leanderson	Sweden	3:44.09	
25	3	Amine Khadiri	Cyprus	3:44.61	
26	1	Tamás Kazi	Hungary	3:44.64	
27	2	Benjamin Kovács	Hungary	3:45.16	
28	1	Eoin Everard	Ireland	3:45.46	
29	2	Marco Pettenazzo	Italy	3:45.65	
30	1	Andreas Vojta	Austria	3:46.32	
31	2	Andreas Bueno	Denmark	3:46.44	
32	2	Hélio Gomes	Portugal	3:46.66	
33	3	Joao Bussotti Neves	Italy	3:50.58	q
34	3	Llorenç Salas	Spain	3:51.49	
35	2	Harvey Dixon	Gibraltar	3:51.82	
	1	Johan Rogestedt	Sweden	DQ	R163.2
	2	Jakub Holuša	Czech Republic	DQ	R163.2

=== Final ===
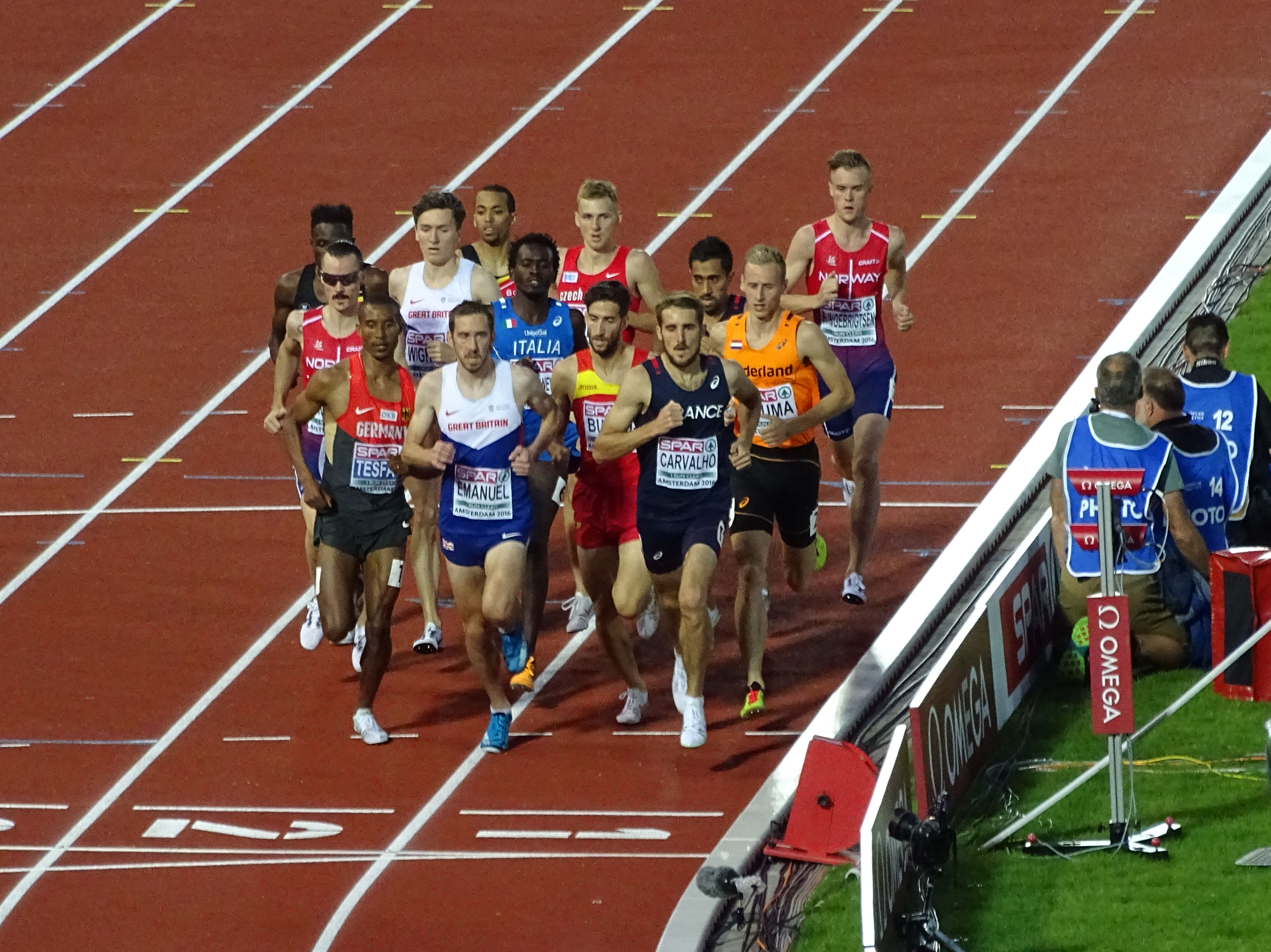
The final underway

Rank	Name	Nationality	Time	Note
1st place, gold medalist(s)	Filip Ingebrigtsen	Norway	3:46.65	
2nd place, silver medalist(s)	David Bustos	Spain	3:46.90	
3rd place, bronze medalist(s)	Henrik Ingebrigtsen	Norway	3:47.18	
4	Richard Douma	Netherlands	3:47.32	
5	Florian Carvalho	France	3:47.32	
6	Lee Emanuel	Great Britain	3:47.57	
7	Jake Wightman	Great Britain	3:47.68	
8	Filip Sasínek	Czech Republic	3:47.76	
9	Isaac Kimeli	Belgium	3:47.92	
10	Homiyu Tesfaye	Germany	3:47.93	
11	Ismael Debjani	Belgium	3:49.12	
12	Joao Bussotti Neves	Italy	3:50.43	
13	Mourad Amdouni	France	3:51.61	
