= Pieter-Jan Hannes =

Belgian middle-distance runner

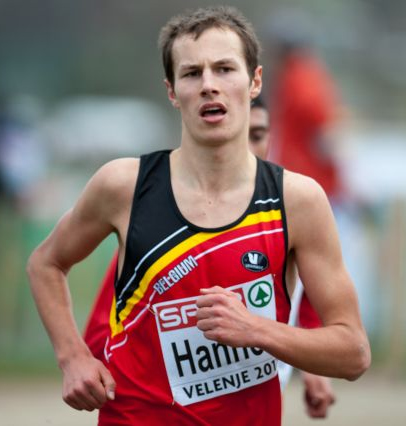
- Pieter-Jan Hannes in 2011

Personal information
- Nationality: Belgian
- Born: 30 October 1992 (age 33) Mortsel, Belgium
- Height: 1.86 m (6 ft 1 in)
- Weight: 72 kg (159 lb)

Sport
- Sport: Athletics
- Event: 1500 metres

Pieter-Jan Hannes (born 30 October 1992, in Mortsel) is a Belgian athlete specialising in the middle-distance events, primarily the 1500 metres, as well as cross-country running. He represented his country at the 2013 World Championships without qualifying for the semifinals. He also won a gold medal at the 2013 European U23 Championships.

== Competition record ==
Year	Competition	Venue	Position	Event	Notes
Representing Belgium
2009	European Youth Olympic Festival	Tampere, Finland	4th	3000 m	8:34.28
2011	European Junior Championships	Tallinn, Estonia	11th	1500 m	3:52.53
2013	European U23 Championships	Tampere, Finland	1st	1500 m	3:43.83
2013	World Championships	Moscow, Russia	25th (h)	1500 m	3:40.39
2014	European Championships	Zürich, Switzerland	14th (h)	1500 m	3:40.34
2015	European Indoor Championships	Prague, Czech Republic	12th	3000 m	7:59.43
2015	World Championships	Beijing, China	20th (sf)	1500 m	3:44.38
2016	Olympic Games	Rio de Janeiro, Brazil	21st (sf)	1500 m	3:43.71

== Personal bests ==
Outdoor

- 800 metres – 1:47.30 (Oordegem-Lede 2013)
- 1500 metres – 3:34.49 (Heusden-Zolder 2014)
- Mile – 3:51.84 NR (Oslo 2015)
- 3000 metres – 7:54.06 (Herentals 2013)

Indoor

- 1500 metres – 3:37.30 (Birmingham 2015)
- 3000 metres – 7:47.55 (Prague 2015)
