= Athletics at the 2017 Summer Universiade – Men's 1500 metres =

The men's 1500 metres event at the 2017 Summer Universiade was held on 23 and 25 August at the Taipei Municipal Stadium.

== Medalists ==
Gold	Silver	Bronze
Timo Benitz; Germany	Alexis Miellet; France	Jonathan Davies; Great Britain

== Results ==
=== Heats ===
Qualification: First 3 in each heat (Q) and next 3 fastest (q) qualified for the semifinals.

Rank	Heat	Name	Nationality	Time	Notes
1	1	Charles Grethen	Luxembourg	3:43.62	Q
2	1	Timo Benitz	Germany	3:43.93	Q
3	1	Jonathan Davies	Great Britain	3:43.95	Q
4	1	Simas Bertašius	Lithuania	3:44.33	q, PB
5	1	Takieddine Hedeilli	Algeria	3:44.49	q
6	1	Mateusz Borkowski	Poland	3:45.29	q, SB
7	1	Jonas Raess	Switzerland	3:45.51	
8	1	Martin Casse	France	3:46.08	
9	2	Alexis Miellet	France	3:46.76	Q
10	2	Fernando Martínez	Mexico	3:46.88	Q
10	2	Isaac Hockey	Australia	3:46.88	Q
12	2	Joao Bussotti Neves Junior	Italy	3:46.89	
13	2	James Bellemore	Canada	3:46.95	
13	2	Elmar Engholm	Sweden	3:46.95	
15	2	Levent Ateş	Turkey	3:47.85	
16	1	Fortunate Turihohabwe	Uganda	3:48.20	PB
17	3	Grzegorz Kalinowski	Poland	3:49.14	Q
18	1	Soufiane El Kabbouri	Italy	3:49.22	
18	2	Jeremiah Motsau	South Africa	3:49.22	
20	2	Mihn Kyun Cho	Denmark	3:49.38	PB
21	3	Rantso Mokopane	South Africa	3:49.84	Q
22	3	Cole Peterson	Canada	3:50.12	Q
23	3	Zemen Addis	Ethiopia	3:50.43	
24	2	Simon Rogers	New Zealand	3:50.74	
25	3	Pieter Claus	Belgium	3:50.97	
26	3	Mikkel Dahl-Jessen	Denmark	3:51.20	
27	1	Musulman Dzholomanov	Kyrgyzstan	3:51.34	PB
28	3	Abderezak Khelili	Algeria	3:51.45	
29	3	Adam Pyke	Australia	3:52.77	
30	2	Cristofer Jarpa	Chile	3:53.24	
31	3	Kevin Kelly	Ireland	3:53.77	
32	3	Ruben Palma	Chile	3:54.97	
33	1	Hugo Rocha	Portugal	3:55.49	
34	3	Christos Dimitriou	Cyprus	3:55.96	
35	3	Abeykoon Jayasundara	Sri Lanka	3:59.32	SB
36	2	Óscar Romero	Colombia	4:00.41	
37	1	Ahmed Ali Al-Aamri	Oman	4:00.64	
38	3	Timothy Ongom	Uganda	4:00.77	
39	1	Mohammed Shafic Ali	Ghana	4:07.15	
40	3	Victor Leon	Colombia	4:09.90	
41	3	Ahmed Al-Muyidi	Saudi Arabia	4:28.53	
42	2	Mazin Al-Subeihi	Oman	4:28.92	

=== Final ===
Official Video

Rank	Name	Nationality	Time	Notes
1st place, gold medalist(s)	Timo Benitz	Germany	3:43.45	
2nd place, silver medalist(s)	Alexis Miellet	France	3:43.91	
3rd place, bronze medalist(s)	Jonathan Davies	Great Britain	3:43.99	
4	Grzegorz Kalinowski	Poland	3:44.57	
5	Charles Grethen	Luxembourg	3:44.59	
6	Isaac Hockey	Australia	3:45.32	
7	Simas Bertašius	Lithuania	3:46.05	
8	Takieddine Hedeilli	Algeria	3:46.87	
9	Fernando Martínez	Mexico	3:47.18	
10	Cole Peterson	Canada	3:47.95	
11	Rantso Mokopane	South Africa	3:47.97	
12	Mateusz Borkowski	Poland	3:50.99	
