= Mohad Abdikadar =

Italian middle-distance runner

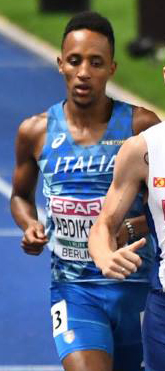
- Mohad Abdikadar in 2018

Personal information
- Full name: Mohad Abdikadar Sheik Ali
- Born: 12 June 1993 (age 33) Beled Hawo, Somalia
- Height: 1.76 m (5 ft 9 in)
- Weight: 61 kg (134 lb)

Sport
- Sport: Athletics
- Event: 1500 metres
- Club: Aeronautica Militare
- Coached by: Andrea Orlandi; Massimo Pegoretti

Achievements and titles
- Personal best: 1500 m: 3:33.79 (2023)
Medal record
European U23 Championships
Silver medal – second place	2015 Tallinn	1500 m

Mohad Abdikadar Sheik Ali (born 12 June 1993) is an Italian middle-distance runner competing primarily in the 1500 metres. He won a silver medal at the 2015 European U23 Championships in Tallinn.

== Biography ==
Born in Beled Hawo, Somalia he arrived in Sezze in January 2006, together with two brothers, as refugees escaping the Somali Civil War. He became a naturalised Italian citizen in May 2011.

At the Golden Gala in Rome in 2018, with a time of 3:36.54 in the 1500 meters, he achieved a time that had not been seen by an Italian in ten years.

In the fall of 2022, he began training under Liberato Pellecchia.

In July 2023, after five years, he improved on his personal best in the 1500 meters set in 2018, with a time of 3'35“21. Just over a month later, on September 3, 2023, he won the Città di Padova international meeting, further improving his time to 3'33”79, becoming the third Italian ever.

== International competitions ==
Year	Competition	Venue	Position	Event	Notes
Representing Italy
2011	European Junior Championships	Tallinn, Estonia	8th	1500 m	3:49.32
2012	World Junior Championships	Barcelona, Spain	11th	1500 m	3:53.74
2013	European Indoor Championships	Gothenburg, Sweden	19th (h)	1500 m	3:47.21
2014	Mediterranean U23 Championships	Aubagne, France	2nd	1500 m	3:51.95
2014	European Championships	Zürich, Switzerland	24th (h)	1500 m	3:46.07
2015	European U23 Championships	Tallinn, Estonia	2nd	1500 m	3:44.91
2016	European Championships	Amsterdam, Netherlands	15th (h)	1500 m	3:42.91
2018	Mediterranean Games	Tarragona, Spain	5th	1500 m	3:39.60
2018	European Championships	Berlin, Germany	10th	1500 m	3:39.95

== Personal bests ==
Outdoor

- 800 metres – 1:48.43 (Salzburg 2014)
- 1000 metres – 2:19.4 (Cantalupa 2014)
- 1500 metres – 3:36.54 (Rome 2018)
- One mile – 4:02.87 (Pavia 2014)
- 3000 metres – 8:09.09 (Trento 2017)
- 10 kilometres – 30:41 (Cuneo 2015)
- Half marathon – 1:08:59 (Ostia 2017)

Indoor

- 800 metres – 1:50.67 (Ancona 2013)
- 1000 metres – 2:22.79 (Ancona 2014)
- 1500 metres – 3:42.53 (Ghent 2018)
- 3000 metres – 8:16.47 (Ancona 2015)

== See also ==
- Italy at the 2018 European Athletics Championships
- Naturalized athletes of Italy
