= Richard Douma =

Dutch middle-distance runner

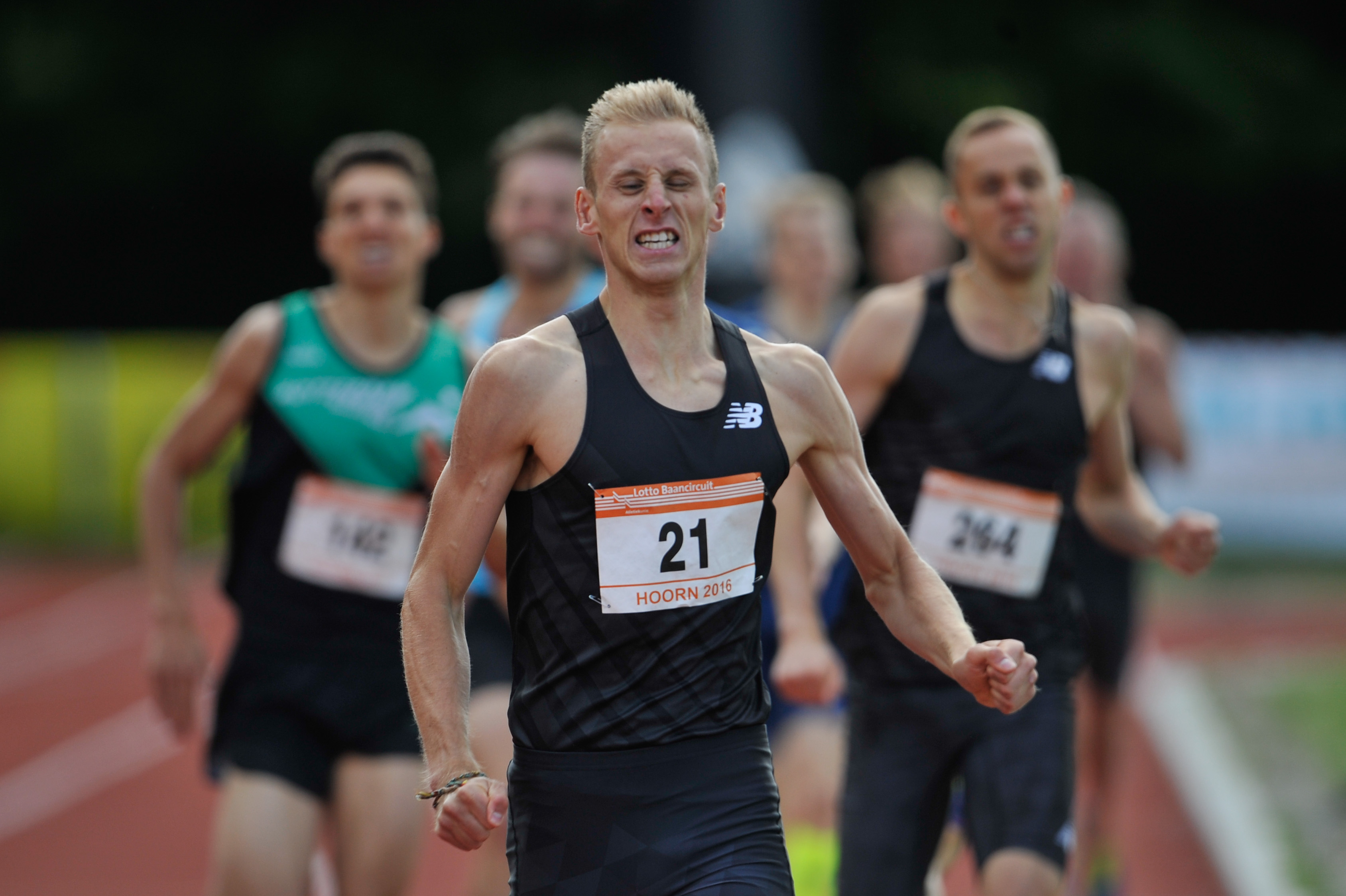
- Richard Douma in 2016

Personal information
- Born: 17 April 1993 (age 33) Zaandam, Netherlands
- Employer: New Balance
- Height: 1.84 m (6 ft 0 in)
- Weight: 64 kg (141 lb)

Sport
- Country: Netherlands
- Sport: Athletics
- Event: 1500 metres
- Club: AV Zaanland
- Team: NN Running Team
- Coached by: Louis Dam

Richard Douma (born 17 April 1993 in Zaandam) is a Dutch middle-distance runner competing primarily in the 1500 metres. He narrowly missed a medal by finishing fourth at the 2016 European Championships.

== International competitions ==
Representing the Netherlands
Year	Competition	Venue	Position	Event	Notes
2013	European U23 Championships	Tampere, Finland	12th	1500 m	3:54.62
2015	European U23 Championships	Tallinn, Estonia	8th	1500 m	3:46.29
2016	European Championships	Amsterdam, Netherlands	4th	1500 m	3:47.32
2017	European Indoor Championships	Belgrade, Serbia	18th (h)	1500 m	3:53.14
2017	World Championships	London, United Kingdom	24th (sf)	1500 m	3:47.74
2019	European Indoor Championships	Glasgow, United Kingdom	27th (h)	800 m	1:50.36

== Personal bests ==
- 800 metres – 1:47.88 (Leiden 2017)
  - 800 metres indoor – 1:48.90 (Apeldoorn 2019)
- 1000 metres – 2:24.26 (Lisse 2015)
- 1500 metres – 3:35.77 (Heusden-Zolder 2016)
  - 1500 metres indoor – 3:41.51 (Toruń 2017)
- One mile – 3:57.60 (London 2016)
  - One mile indoor – 4:05.47 (Athlone 2017)
- 3000 metres – 8:05.45 (Gothenburg 2018)
  - 3000 metres indoor – 8:44.67 (Apeldoorn 2012)
- 5000 metres – 14:03.04 (Apeldoorn 2022)
- 3000 metres steeplechase – 8:40.28 (Nice 2021)

Road

- 5 kilometres - 13:27 (Monaco 2021) NR
- 10 kilometres - 28:08 (Valencia 2020) =NR
- Half marathon - 1:02:23 (Ghent 2022)
- Marathon - 2:12:21 (Rotterdam 2022)
