= Teshome Dirirsa =

Ethiopian athlete

Teshome Dirirsa (born 25 April 1994) is an Ethiopian male athlete. Dirirsa has competed at the IAAF World Youth Championships in 2011 and in 2012. He won the gold medal in the Boy's 1500 metres event at the 2011 World Youth Championships
