= Paul Robinson (athlete) =

Irish runner

Personal information
- Born: 24 May 1991 (age 35)

Sport
- Sport: Athletics
- Event: 1500 metres
- Coached by: Nic Bideau

Paul Robinson (born 24 May 1991) is an Irish middle-distance runner competing primarily in the 1500 metres. He represented his country in the 800 metres at the 2013 World Championships without advancing from the first round. In addition, he finished fourth at the 2014 European Championships.

== International competitions ==
| Year | Competition | Venue | Position | Event | Notes |
Representing Ireland
| 2009 | European Junior Championships | Novi Sad, Serbia | 24th (h) | 1500 m | 4:16.21 |
| 2010 | World Junior Championships | Moncton, Canada | 9th | 1500 m | 3:44.56 |
| 2011 | European U23 Championships | Ostrava, Czech Republic | 15th (h) | 1500 m | 3:46.52 |
| 2012 | European Championships | Helsinki, Finland | 21st (h) | 1500 m | 3:47.26 |
| 2013 | European U23 Championships | Tampere, Finland | 4th | 1500 m | 3:45.12 |
| 2013 | World Championships | Moscow, Russia | 36th (h) | 800 m | 1:48.61 |
| 2014 | European Championships | Zurich, Switzerland | 4th | 1500 m | 3:46.35 |
| 2021 | European Indoor Championships | Toruń, Poland | 10th | 1500 m | 3:40.74 |

== Personal bests ==
Outdoor

- 800 metres – 1:45.86 (Dublin 2013)
- 1000 metres – 2:17.93 (Ostrava 2014)
- 1500 metres – 3:35.22 (Rieti 2013)
- One mile – 3:54.77 (Oslo 2014)
- 3000 metres – 7:58.56 (Glendale 2014)
- 5000 metres – 13:54.34 (Glendale 2013)

Indoor

- 1000 metres – 2:27.38 (Ostrava 2014)
- 1500 metres – 3:39.36 (Val-de-Reuil 2021)
- One mile – 4:02.77 (Athlone 2017)
- 3000 metres – 8:09.79 (Abbotstown 2019)
