= Abdi Waiss Mouhyadin =

Djiboutian middle-distance runner

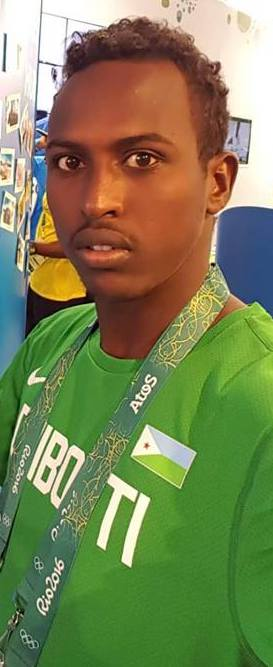
- Mouhyadin in 2016

Personal information
- Born: 3 July 1996 (age 30) Djibouti City, Djibouti

Sport
- Sport: Track and field
- Events: 1500 metres, 5000 metres
Medal record
Men's athletics
Representing Djibouti
African Games
Silver medal – second place	2015 Brazzaville	1500 m
African Championships
Bronze medal – third place	2024 Douala	5000 m

Abdi Waiss Mouhyadin (Somali: Cabdi Wacays Muxiyadiin) is a Djiboutian middle and long-distance runner. He represented his country at the 2015 World Championships in Beijing reaching the semifinals. In addition he won a silver medal at the 2015 African Games.

== International competitions ==
Year	Competition	Venue	Position	Event	Notes
Representing Djibouti
2014	World Junior Championships	Eugene, United States	2nd	1500 m	3:41.38
2014	African Championships	Marrakesh, Morocco	17th (h)	1500 m	3:57.99
2015	Arab Championships	Isa Town, Bahrain	2nd	1500 m	3:46.56
2015	World Championships	Beijing, China	23rd (sf)	1500 m	3:46.82
2015	African Games	Brazzaville, Republic of the Congo	2nd	1500 m	3:45.98
2016	Olympic Games	Rio de Janeiro, Brazil	–	1500 m	DNF
2017	Islamic Solidarity Games	Baku, Azerbaijan	6th (h)	1500 m	3:51.06^{1}
2019	African Games	Rabat, Morocco	16th (h)	1500 m	3:44.98
2019	World Championships	Doha, Qatar	30th (h)	1500 m	3:38.79
2023	Arab Championships	Marrakesh, Morocco	2nd	10,000 m	30:26.04
2023	Arab Championships	Marrakesh, Morocco	1st	Half marathon	1:06:33
2024	Olympic Games	Paris, France	29th (h)	5000 m	14:11.88
2025	World Championships	Tokyo, Japan	–	Marathon	DNF

^{1}Did not start in the final

== Personal bests ==
Outdoor

- 800 metres – 1:47.53 (Mataró 2015)
- 1000 metres – 2:20.28 (Gothenburg 2015)
- 1500 metres – 3:34.55 (Doha 2016)
- Mile – 3:57.97 (Eugene 2015)
- 5000 metres – 13:02.38 (Bordeaux 2024)

Indoor

- 1500 metres – 3:41.64 (Sabadell 2018)
- 3000 metres – 8:01.27 (Stockholm 2016)

Olympic Games
Preceded by Zourah Ali	Flagbearer for Djibouti; Rio de Janeiro 2016	Succeeded by Aden-Alexandre Houssein
