= Jonathan Kiplimo Sawe =

Kenyan middle-distance runner (born 1995)

Jonathan Kiplimo Sawe (born 26 November 1995) is a Kenyan middle-distance runner. Sawe came 3rd place in the 1500 metres at the 2011 World Youth Championships in Lille, France. Later in 2014, Sawe won the 1500 metres at the 2014 World Junior Championships in Eugene, United States.
