= Charlie Grice =

British middle-distance runner

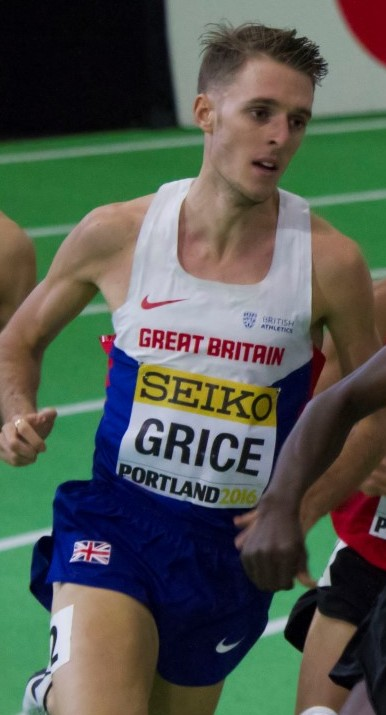
- Grice competing at the 2016 IAAF World Indoor Championships

Personal information
- Born: 7 November 1993 (age 32) Brighton, Sussex, England
- Website: charliegrice.com

Sport
- Sport: Athletics
- Event: middle-distance
- Club: Brighton Phoenix

Achievements and titles
- Personal best: 1500 metres: 3:30.62 (2019)

Charles Da'Vall Grice (born 7 November 1993) is a British former middle-distance athlete who competed at the 2016 Summer Olympics.

== Biography ==
Grice started out as both a footballer, playing at county level, and an athlete, but balancing them both led to injuries, and he decided to solely focus on athletics. He had a breakthrough in 2010, when he broke the English Schools' Athletics Association Championships record in the final of the 1500 metres as well as taking the title. He went on from this to win bronze at the 2010 Summer Youth Olympics in the 1000 metres, after coming second at the European Trials event in Russia.

In 2012 he broke Steve Ovett's British junior mile record, running 3:57.90 at the London Grand Prix in Crystal Palace as part of the Diamond League. In doing this at the age of 18, he became one of less than 75 athletes who had achieved a sub-four minute mile clocking by the age of 18. Also that year, he was knocked out in the heats of the 1500 metres at the World Junior Championships after finishing one place outside the automatic qualification places in a slow race, preventing him from securing a 'fastest loser' place.

He made his international breakthrough in 2013, winning a silver medal at the European U23 Championships, as well as setting a new PB over 1500 metres at an international standard IAAF World Challenge meeting. He also received his first senior British vest as he competed in the European Team Championships.

In 2014 he won the British Athletics Championships 1500 metres title, winning his heat by half a second and the final by over a second as he took his first senior title at the age of 20. Later in 2014 he went on to compete at the European Athletics Championships and the Commonwealth Games, both times in the 1500 metres. At the Europeans he came second in his heat, with the third fastest time of the first round, but then fell twice in the final, causing him to run his slowest time since 2010 and come in twelfth. At the Commonwealths he was second in his heat, and came seventh in the final.

In 2015 he won the British Indoor title over 1500 metres, which qualified him for the European Indoor Championships, where he came fifth in the 1500 metres final. He then won British U23 and Senior 1500 metres titles, before going to Beijing at the end of August to compete in the World Championships. He qualified automatically in the heats and the semi-finals, but then came ninth in the final.

In 2016 Grice won the British Indoor 1500 metres title, was knocked out in the heats of the World Indoor Championships and competed at the Eugene Diamond League, winning the International Mile race and setting a PB by almost two seconds.

At the 2016 Olympic Games in Rio, he represented Great Britain in the 1500 metres, finishing 14th in the final.

At the IAAF Diamond League meeting on 11 July 2019, in Monaco, Grice set another PB of 3:30.62, to overtake Steve Ovett on the all-time list, placing him fourth, behind Sebastian Coe, Steve Cram and Mo Farah. In June 2024, he announced on Instagram that he was retiring.
