= 2017 World Youth Championships in Athletics – Boys' 1500 metres =

The Boys' 1500 metres at the 2017 World Youth Championships in Athletics was held on 12 and 14 July.

== Medalists ==
Gold	Silver	Bronze

== Records ==
Prior to the competition, the following records were as follows.

World Youth Best	Nicholas Kiptanui Kemboi (KEN)	3:33.72	Zürich, Switzerland	18 August 2006
Championship Record	Kumari Taki (KEN)	3:36.38	Cali, Colombia	17 July 2015
World Youth Leading	Jakob Ingebrigtsen (NOR)	3:39.92	Stockholm, Sweden	18 June 2017

== Heats ==
Qualification rule: first 4 of each heat (Q) and the next 4 fastest qualified.

Rank	Heat	Name	Nationality	Time	Notes
	1	Hosea Kiplangat	Uganda		
	1	Nassim Ben Omrane	Tunisia		
	1	Dominic Kipkemboi	Kenya		
	1	Abebe Dessassa	Ethiopia		
	1	Ali Mhanna	Lebanon		
	1	Rabie Deliba	Algeria		
	1	Bereket Tedros	Eritrea		
	1	Burhan Görüroglu	Turkey		
	1	Carlos Alberto Vilches	Puerto Rico		
	1	Yan Wei	China		
	1	Shomari Mtalim	Tanzania		
	2	Elias Schreml	Germany		
	2	George Meitamei Manangoi	Kenya		
	2	Oussama Slimani	Tunisia		
	2	Mohammed Ahmed Abubakar	Athletes Refugee Team		
	2	Avdesh Nagar	India		
	2	Zhang Dayu	China		
	2	SeyedAmir Zamanpour	Iran		
	2	Anass Essayi	Morocco		
	2	Daniel Kiprop	Uganda		
	2	Belete Mekonen	Ethiopia		
	2	Abdelilah Zahir	Morocco		
	2	Mohamed Muhidin Yalahow	Somalia		
