= Stanley Mburu =

Kenyan long-distance runner

Personal information
- Nationality: Kenya
- Born: 9 April 2000 (age 26)

Sport
- Sport: Athletics
- Event(s): 5000 metres, 10,000 metres

Achievements and titles
- Personal best(s): 3000 m: 7:50.64 (2017); 5000 m: 13:05.21 (2019); 10,000 m: 27:13.01 (2018)
Medal record
Men's athletics
Representing Kenya
World Championships
Silver medal – second place	2022 Eugene	10,000 m

Stanley Waithaka Mburu (born 9 April 2000) is a Kenyan male long-distance runner who competes in the 5000 metres and 10,000 metres

Mburu enjoyed his first international success at the 2017 IAAF World U18 Championships, taking a bronze medal in the 3000 metres behind Ethiopia's Selemon Barega and Kenyan compatriot Edward Zakayo. The following year he made his debut on the 2018 IAAF Diamond League circuit, taking third in the 5000 metres with a personal best of 13:10.14 minutes. This time ranked him in the top twenty for the distance that year. At the 2018 IAAF World U20 Championships he was again bested by Zakayo, making it a Kenyan 1–2 in the 5000 m final, while reigning U18 champion Selemon Barega finished out of the medals. Mburu won at the Palio Città della Quercia meet in August, but failed to finish at the more prestigious Memorial Van Damme race.

Mburu moved to Japan in late 2018 and began to compete for the Yakult corporate team. In November he ran 27:13.01 minutes for the 10,000 metres, which was the fastest time by any athlete that year. In 2022 World Athletics Championship in Eugene, Oregon, Mburu finished second in the 10000 meters behind Uganda's Joshua Cheptegei.

== International competitions ==
Year	Competition	Venue	Position	Event	Notes
2017	World U18 Championships	Nairobi, Kenya	3rd	3000 m	7:50.64
2018	World U20 Championships	Tampere, Finland	2nd	5000 m	13:20.57
2022	World Championships	Eugene, Oregon, USA	2nd	10,000 m	27:27.90

== Personal bests ==
Outdoor

Event	Time	Date	Place
3000 m	7:50.64	16 July 2017	Nairobi
5000 m	13:05.21	20 July 2019	Heusden-Zolder
10000m	27:13.01	10 November 2018	Yokohama
5k Road	13:28	9 November 2019	Lille

- From World Athletics Profile
