= Justus Soget =

Ethiopian middle- and long-distance runner

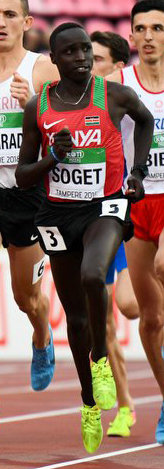
- Soget at the 2018 World U20 Championships

Personal information
- Nationality: Kenyan
- Born: 22 October 1999 (age 26)
- Home town: Nakuru, Kenya

Sport
- Sport: Athletics
- Events: 1500 metres, 3000 metres, 10,000 metres
- Coached by: Barnabas Kitili

Achievements and titles
- Personal bests: 1500m: 3:32.97 (2017); Mile: 3:57.90 (2019); 3000m: 7:35.91 (2021); 5000m: 13:12.90 (2022); 10,000m: 27:30.31(2022)
Medal record
Men's athletics
Representing Kenya
World U20 Championships
Bronze medal – third place	2018 Tampere	1500 m

Justus Soget (born 22 October 1999) is a Kenyan middle- and long-distance runner. He was the bronze medalist at the 2018 World U20 Championships in the men's 1500 metres.

== Biography ==
Soget grew up in Nakuru, Kenya where he attended Kirobon High School. Soget was a star prep athlete in Kenya, finishing second representing his high school at the Rift Valley Secondary Schools Sports Association National Games. While in high school his roommate was Bethwell Birgen, World Indoor 3000 m bronze medalist for Kenya.

At the 2018 World U20 Championships in the men's 1500 metres, Soget finished 3rd, only losing to countryman George Manangoi and future Olympic champion Jakob Ingebrigtsen.

At the 2022 Hokuren Distance Challenge organized by the Japan Association of Athletics Federations, Soget won the men's 5000 m despite being employed as a pacemaker. He won in a time of 13:12.90, under the 2022 World Athletics Championships qualification standard.

Soget's father is Christopher Soget, who was part of the gold medal-winning Kenyan team at the 1999 World Cross Country Championships U20 race.

== Statistics ==
=== Personal bests ===
Event	Mark	Competition	Venue	Date
1500 metres	3:32.97 A	Kenyan Athletics Championships	Nairobi, Kenya	24 June 2017
10,000 metres	27:30.31	Nippon Sport Science University Long Distance Competition	Yokohama, Japan	4 June 2022
