= 2019 European Athletics Indoor Championships – Men's 1500 metres =

The men's 1500 metres event at the 2019 European Athletics Indoor Championships was held on 1 March 2019 at 11:50 (heats), and on 3 March 2019 at 20:01 (final) local time.

== Medalists ==
Gold	Silver	Bronze
Marcin Lewandowski; Poland	Jakob Ingebrigtsen; Norway	Jesús Gómez; Spain

== Records ==
Standing records prior to the 2019 European Athletics Indoor Championships
World record	Samuel Tefera (ETH)	3:31.04	Birmingham, United Kingdom	16 February 2019
European record	Andrés Manuel Díaz (ESP)	3:33.32	Piraeus, Greece	24 February 1999
Championship record	Ivan Heshko (UKR)	3:36.70	Madrid, Spain	6 March 2005
World Leading	Samuel Tefera (ETH)	3:31.04	Birmingham, United Kingdom	16 February 2019
European Leading	Josh Kerr (GBR)	3:35.72	Birmingham, United Kingdom	16 February 2019

== Results ==
=== Heats ===
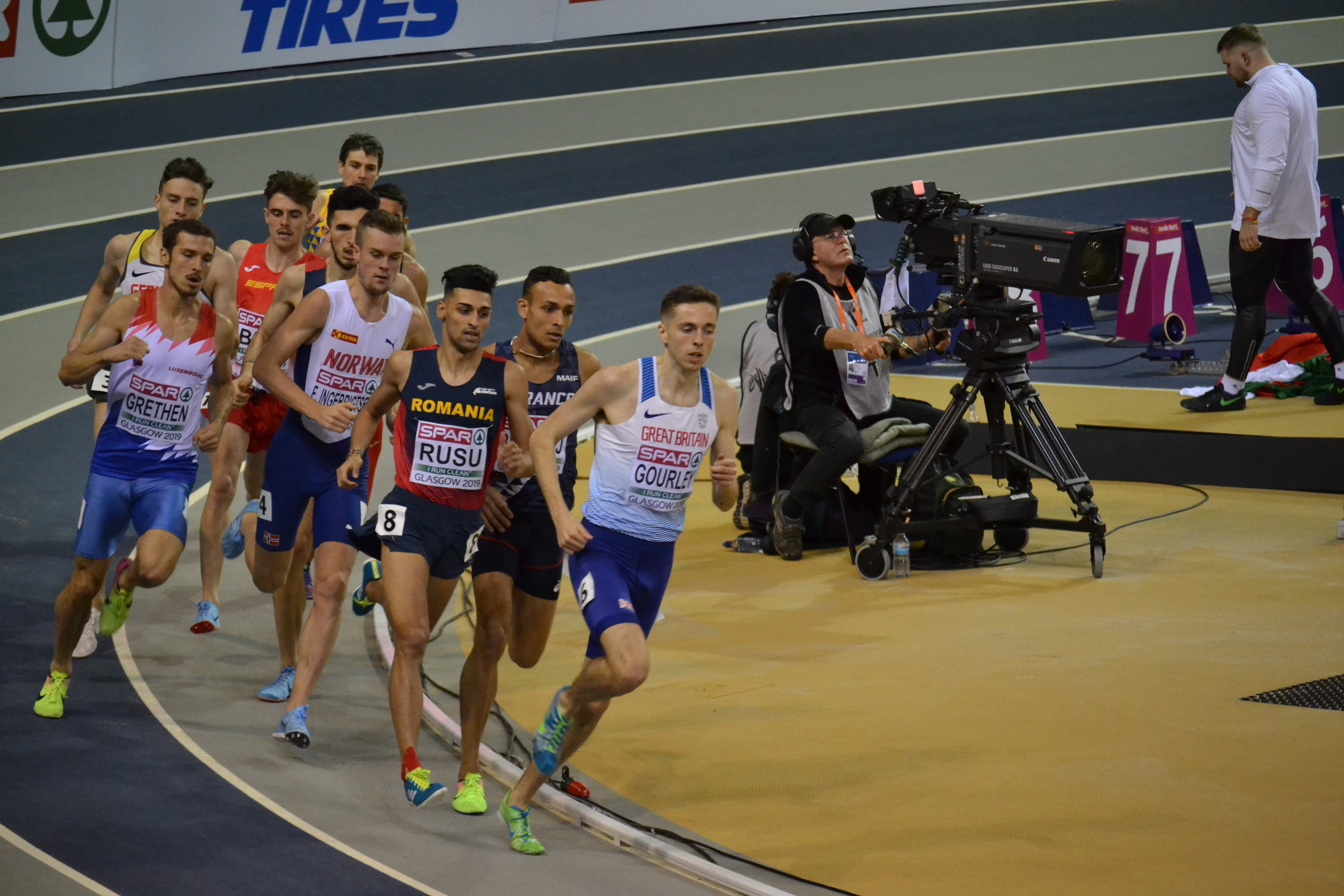
Heat 1

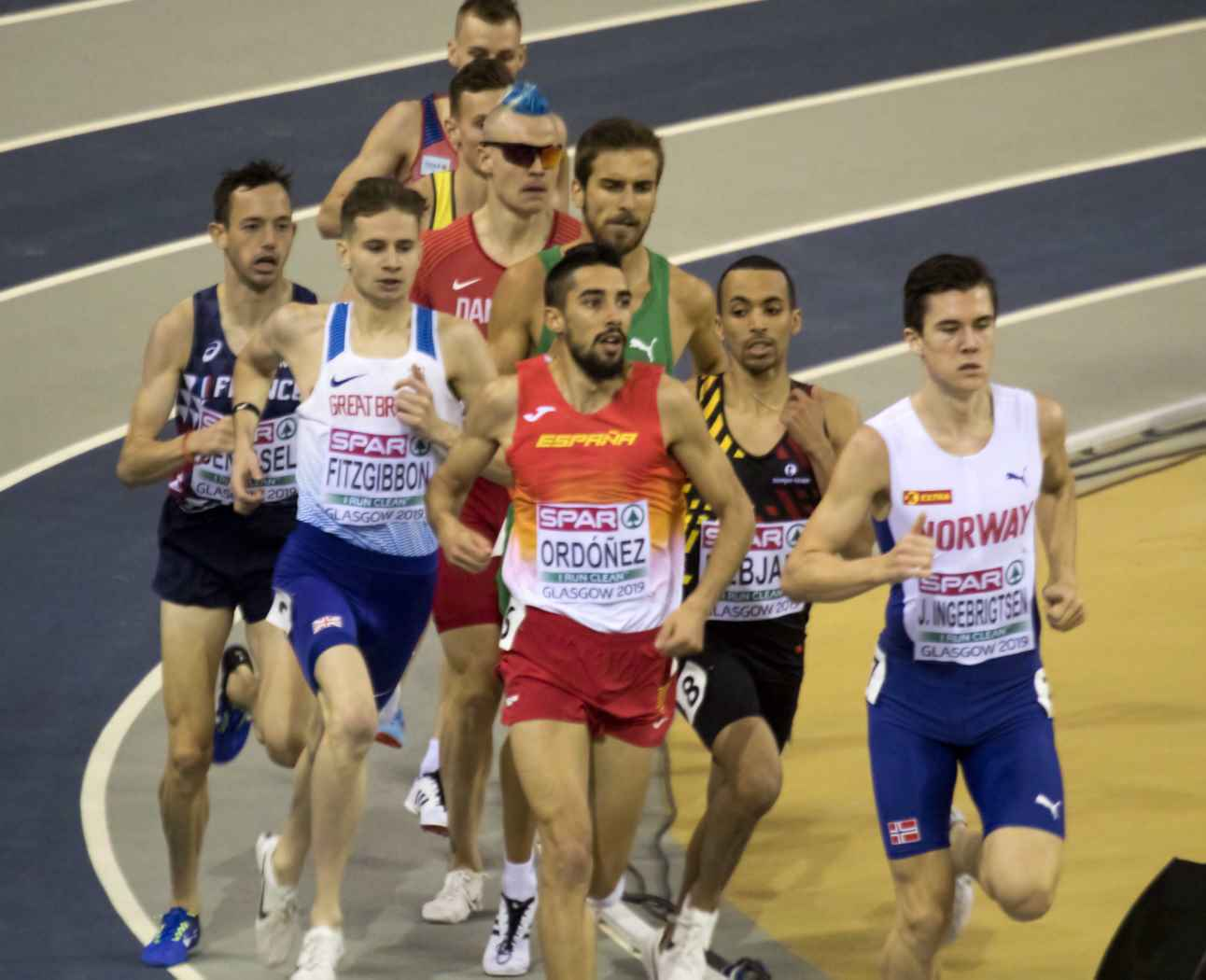
Heat 2

Qualification: First 2 in each heat (Q) and the next 4 fastest (q) advance to the Final.

Rank	Heat	Athlete	Nationality	Time	Note
1	2	Jakob Ingebrigtsen	Norway	3:42.00	Q
2	2	Filip Sasínek	Czech Republic	3:42.84	Q
3	2	Robbie Fitzgibbon	Great Britain	3:43.09	q
4	2	Simon Denissel	France	3:43.79	q
5	2	Karl Bebendorf	Germany	3:45.70	q
6	2	Nick Jensen	Denmark	3:46.40	
7	2	Emanuel Rolim	Portugal	3:46.62	
8	1	Neil Gourley	Great Britain	3:46.63	Q
9	1	Marius Probst	Germany	3:46.93	Q
10	3	Marcin Lewandowski	Poland	3:47.45	Q
11	3	Jesús Gómez	Spain	3:47.53	Q
12	3	Samir Dahmani	France	3:47.69	
13	1	Elzan Bibić	Serbia	3:47.94	
14	1	Adrián Ben	Spain	3:48.24	
15	1	Mehdi Belhadj	France	3:48.30	
16	3	Elliot Giles	Great Britain	3:48.76	
17	1	Yervand Mkrtchyan	Armenia	3:49.25	
18	3	Paulo Rosário	Portugal	3:49.32	
19	3	Jan Friš	Czech Republic	3:49.59	
20	3	Simas Bertašius	Lithuania	3:49.90	
21	1	Charles Grethen	Luxembourg	3:50.42	
22	3	Andreas Dimitrakis	Greece	3:50.94	
23	3	Ferdinand Kvan Edman	Norway	3:51.43	
24	1	Volodymyr Kyts	Ukraine	3:53.91	SB
25	1	Dorin Andrei Rusu	Romania	3:57.52	
	2	Saúl Ordóñez	Spain	DNF	
	2	Ismael Debjani	Belgium	DQ	R163.2 (b)
	1	Filip Ingebrigtsen	Norway	DQ	R163.3 (b)

=== Final ===
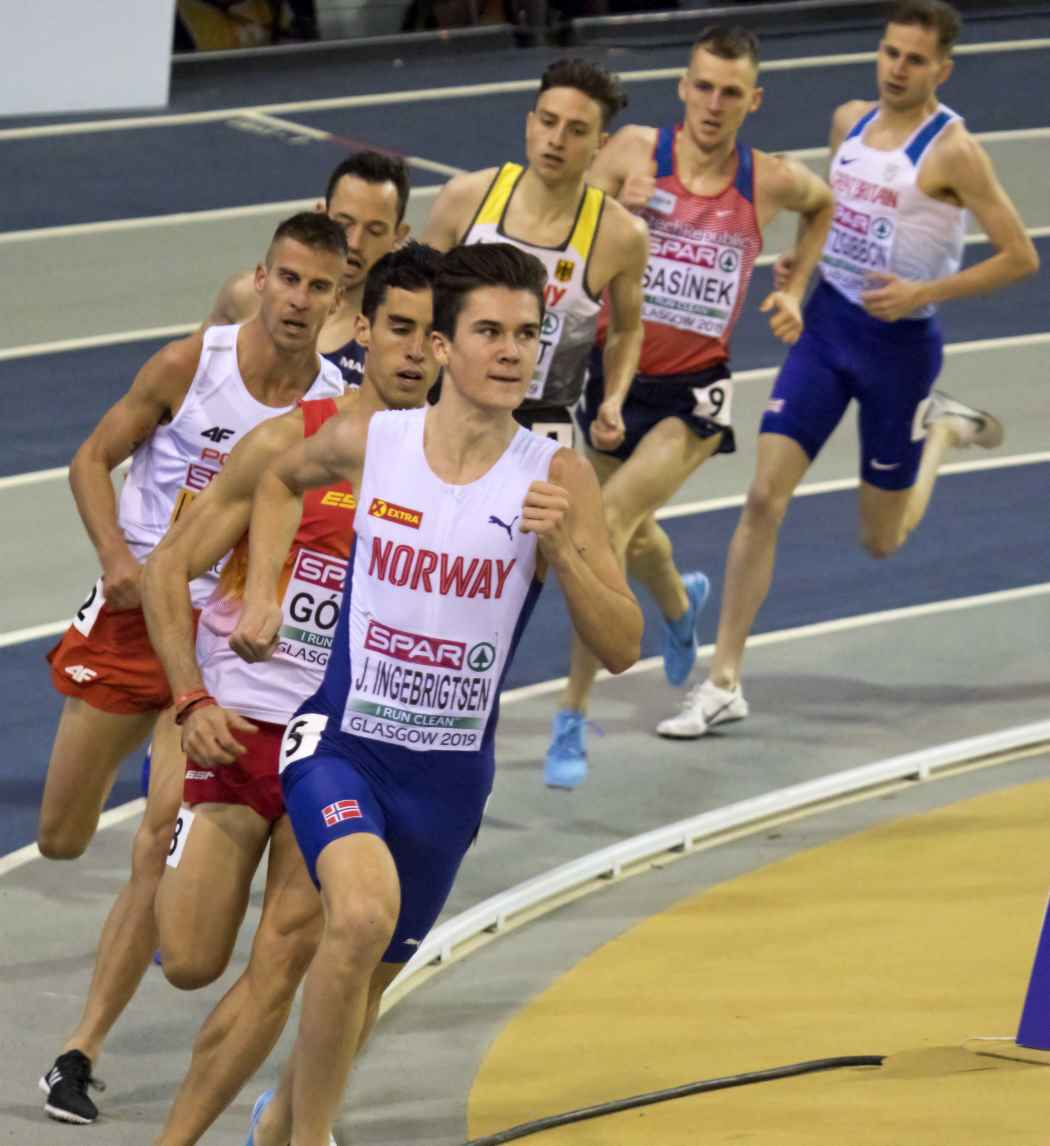
The final

Rank	Name	Nationality	Time	Notes
1st place, gold medalist(s)	Marcin Lewandowski	Poland	3:42.85	
2nd place, silver medalist(s)	Jakob Ingebrigtsen	Norway	3:43.23	
3rd place, bronze medalist(s)	Jesús Gómez	Spain	3:44.39	
4	Filip Sasínek	Czech Republic	3:45.27	
5	Simon Denissel	France	3:45.50	
6	Marius Probst	Germany	3:45.76	
7	Karl Bebendorf	Germany	3:46.88	
8	Robbie Fitzgibbon	Great Britain	3:47.08	
	Neil Gourley	Great Britain	DNS	
