= Athletics at the 2019 Summer Universiade – Men's 1500 metres =

The men's 1500 metres event at the 2019 Summer Universiade was held on 8 and 10 July at the Stadio San Paolo in Naples.

== Medalists ==
Gold	Silver	Bronze
Michał Rozmys; Poland	Jan Friš; Czech Republic	Joonas Rinne; Finland

== Results ==
=== Heats ===
Qualification: First 3 in each heat (Q) and next 3 fastest (q) qualified for the final.

Rank	Heat	Name	Nationality	Time	Notes
1	1	El Hocine Zourkane	Algeria	3:42.46	Q
2	1	Michael Wilson	Great Britain	3:43.19	Q, PB
3	1	Stijn Baeten	Belgium	3:43.49	Q
4	1	Emmanuel Osuje	Uganda	3:44.69	q, PB
5	1	Shashi Bhushan Singh	India	3:45.42	q, PB
6	1	Fabian Manrique	Argentina	3:45.48	q
7	1	Kevin Robertson	Canada	3:46.15	
8	2	Michał Rozmys	Poland	3:47.82	Q
9	2	Jan Friš	Czech Republic	3:48.04	Q
10	2	Abderezak Khelili	Algeria	3:48.12	Q
11	2	Mike Foppen	Netherlands	3:48.12	
12	2	Enrico Riccobon	Italy	3:48.85	
13	1	Ådne Andersen	Norway	3:48.91	
14	1	Lee Jung-kook	South Korea	3:49.26	
15	2	Ryoji Tatezawa	Japan	3:49.96	
16	3	Marius Probst	Germany	3:51.31	Q
17	3	Joonas Rinne	Finland	3:51.74	Q
18	3	Mikkel Dahl-Jessen	Denmark	3:51.81	Q
19	2	Jacob Ilbjerg Stengaard	Denmark	3:52.61	
20	3	Nicolae Marian Coman	Romania	3:53.01	
21	3	Even Brøndbo Dahl	Norway	3:53.13	
22	3	Nifras Rojideen	Sri Lanka	3:53.27	PB
23	3	Hristiyan Stoyanov	Bulgaria	3:53.39	PB
24	3	Esteban González	Chile	3:54.02	
25	3	Dage Minors	Bermuda	3:54.60	
26	2	Ahmed Muhumed	Somalia	3:55.35	
27	3	Ricardo Ferreira	Portugal	3:56.72	
28	2	Peter Al-Khoury	Lebanon	3:57.53	SB
29	2	Timothy Ongom	Uganda	3:57.55	
30	2	Bilano Bilal	Indonesia	3:59.02	
31	3	Yervand Mkrtchyan	Armenia	4:07.39	
32	3	Ayanda Kunene	Eswatini	4:14.10	
33	1	Aqeel Al-Ammari	Saudi Arabia	4:30.33	
34	2	Mohammed Madkhli	Saudi Arabia	4:41.12	
35	1	Tariku Mekonen	Ethiopia	4:58.38	
	1	Aboubacar Sidime	Guinea	DNS	
	3	Moad Zahafi	Morocco	DNS	

=== Final ===
Official Video

Rank	Name	Nationality	Time	Notes
1st place, gold medalist(s)	Michał Rozmys	Poland	3:53.67	
2nd place, silver medalist(s)	Jan Friš	Czech Republic	3:53.95	
3rd place, bronze medalist(s)	Joonas Rinne	Finland	3:54.02	
4	Stijn Baeten	Belgium	3:54.26	
5	Michael Wilson	Great Britain	3:54.50	
6	Abderezak Khelili	Algeria	3:55.15	
7	El Hocine Zourkane	Algeria	3:55.51	
8	Mikkel Dahl-Jessen	Denmark	3:55.61	
9	Fabian Manrique	Argentina	3:58.56	
10	Emmanuel Osuje	Uganda	3:59.27	
11	Shashi Bhushan Singh	India	3:59.67	
	Marius Probst	Germany	DNS	
