= 2017 European Athletics Indoor Championships – Men's 1500 metres =

The men's 1500 metres event at the 2017 European Athletics Indoor Championships was held on 3 March 2017 at 19:15 (heats) and on 4 March 20:18 (final) local time.

== Medalists ==
Gold	Silver	Bronze
Marcin Lewandowski; Poland	Kalle Berglund; Sweden	Filip Sasínek; Czech Republic

== Records ==
Standing records prior to the 2017 European Athletics Indoor Championships
World record	Hicham El Guerrouj (MAR)	3:31.18	Stuttgart, Germany	2 February 1997
European record	Andrés Manuel Díaz (ESP)	3:33.32	Piraeus, Greece	24 February 1999
Championship record	Ivan Heshko (UKR)	3:36.70	Madrid, Spain	6 March 2005
World Leading	Ben Blankenship (USA)	3:36.42	Birmingham, United Kingdom	18 February 2017
European Leading	Andrew Butchart (GBR)	3:37.58	New York City, United States	4 February 2017

== Results ==
=== Heats ===
Qualification: First 2 in each heat (Q) and the next 3 fastest (q) advance to the Final.

Rank	Heat	Athlete	Nationality	Time	Note
1	3	Timo Benitz	Germany	3:43.09	Q
2	2	Filip Sasínek	Czech Republic	3:43.64	Q
3	3	Marcin Lewandowski	Poland	3:43.70	Q
4	3	Johan Rogestedt	Sweden	3:44.12	q
5	3	Yassin Bouih	Italy	3:44.67	q
6	3	Llorenç Sales	Spain	3:45.56	q
7	2	Kalle Berglund	Sweden	3:45.68	Q
8	2	Emanuel Rolim	Portugal	3:46.96	
9	1	Thomas Lancashire	Great Britain	3:47.37	Q
10	2	Tamás Kazi	Hungary	3:47.64	
11	1	Sofiane Selmouni	France	3:47.71	Q
12	1	Marius Probst	Germany	3:47.89	
13	3	Goran Nava	Serbia	3:48.53	
14	2	Jan Hochstrasser	Switzerland	3:49.49	
15	1	Sergio Paniagua	Spain	3:50.00	
16	1	Jan Friš	Czech Republic	3:50.38	
17	1	Filip Ingebrigtsen	Norway	3:51.25	
18	1	Richard Douma	Netherlands	3:53.14	
19	3	Dixon Harvey	Gibraltar	3:54.09	
20	1	Yervand Mkrtchyan	Armenia	3:54.53	
21	2	Marc Alcalá	Spain	3:54.85	q
22	2	John Travers	Ireland	3:59.72	q

=== Final ===
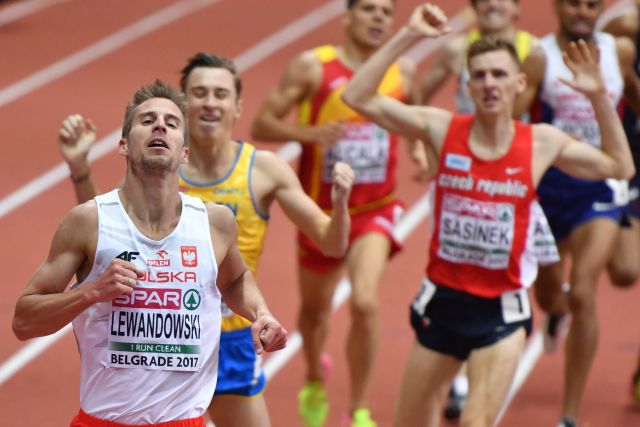
Finish of the final

Rank	Athlete	Nationality	Time	Note
1st place, gold medalist(s)	Marcin Lewandowski	Poland	3:44.82	
2nd place, silver medalist(s)	Kalle Berglund	Sweden	3:45.56	
3rd place, bronze medalist(s)	Filip Sasínek	Czech Republic	3:45.89	
4	Marc Alcalá	Spain	3:46.36	
5	Thomas Lancashire	Great Britain	3:46.57	
6	Sofiane Selmouni	France	3:46.70	
7	Timo Benitz	Germany	3:46.73	
8	Yassin Bouih	Italy	3:47.95	
9	Llorenç Sales	Spain	3:48.56	
10	Johan Rogestedt	Sweden	3:49.91	
11	John Travers	Ireland	3:53.11	
