= Filip Sasínek =

Czech middle-distance runner

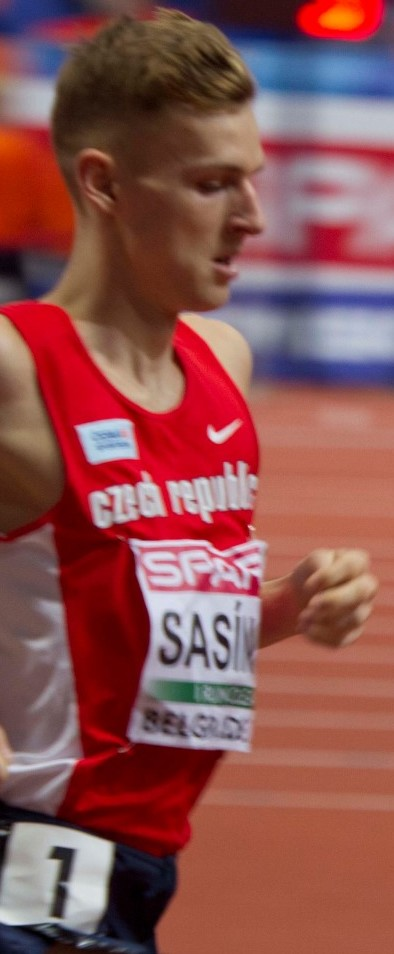
- Filip Sasínek in 2017

Personal information
- Born: 8 January 1996 (age 30) Hodonín, Czech Republic
- Height: 1.81 m (5 ft 11 in)
- Weight: 63 kg (139 lb)

Sport
- Sport: Athletics
- Event: 1500 metres
- Club: Atletický klub Hodonín
Medal record
Men's athletics
Representing Czech Republic
European Indoor Championships
Bronze medal – third place	2017 Belgrade	1500 metres
European U23 Championships
Silver medal – second place	2017 Bydgoszcz	1500 metres

Filip Sasínek (born 8 January 1996) is a Czech middle-distance runner. He won the bronze medal in the 1500 metres at the 2017 European Indoor Championships.

== International competitions ==
Year	Competition	Venue	Position	Event	Notes
Representing the Czech Republic
2013	World Youth Championships	Donetsk, Ukraine	35th (h)	1500 m	4:24.59
2013	World Youth Championships	Donetsk, Ukraine	8th	3000 m s'chase	5:47.90
2014	World Junior Championships	Eugene, United States	25th (h)	1500 m	3:50.39
2014	World Junior Championships	Eugene, United States	14th (h)	3000 m s'chase	8:55.53
2015	European Indoor Championships	Prague, Czech Republic	32nd (h)	800 m	1:51.08
2015	European Junior Championships	Eskilstuna, Sweden	16th (h)	3000 m s'chase	9:11.84
2016	European Championships	Amsterdam, Netherlands	8th	1500 m	3:47.76
2017	European Indoor Championships	Belgrade, Serbia	3rd	1500 m	3:45.89
2017	European U23 Championships	Bydgoszcz, Poland	2nd	1500 m	3:49.23
2019	European Indoor Championships	Glasgow, United Kingdom	4th	1500 m	3:45.27
2019	World Championships	Doha, Qatar	27th (h)	1500 m	3:38.17
2021	European Indoor Championships	Toruń, Poland	9th	1500 m	3:40.64
2022	World Championships	Eugene, United States	31st (h)	1500 m	3:39.47
2022	European Championships	Munich, Germany	–	1500 m	DNF
2023	European Indoor Championships	Istanbul, Turkey	16th (h)	1500 m	3:44.76
2024	World Indoor Championships	Glasgow, United Kingdom	14th (h)	1500 m	3:43.82
2025	World Indoor Championships	Nanjing, China	9th (h)	1500 m	3:40.86
2025	World Championships	Tokyo, Japan	46th (h)	1500 m	3:43.17

== National titles ==
- Czech Athletics Championships (4)
  - 1500 metres: 2017, 2020, 2022, 2023
- Czech Indoor Athletics Championships (5)
  - 1500 metres: 2016, 2017, 2019, 2021, 2023

== Personal bests ==
Outdoor

- 400 metres – 48.98 (Hodonín 2018)
- 600 metres – 1:19.57 (Bratislava 2014)
- 800 metres – 1:46.24 (Göteborg 2020)
- 1000 metres – 2:19.03 (Ostrava 2017)
- 1500 metres – 3:34.30 (Ostrava 2025)
- One mile – 3:59.02 (Ostrava 2019)
- 3000 metres – 8:38.39 (Breclav 2014)
- 5000 metres – 13:58.92 (Opava 2020)

Indoor

- 800 metres – 1:47.75 (Ostrava 2019)
- 1000 metres – 2:19.62 (Pague 2021)
- 1500 metres – 3:36.53 (Toruń 2021) NR
- One mile – 4:00.07 (Athlone 2016) NR
- 3000 metres – 8:13.22 (Prague 2017)
