= Jan Friš =

Czech runner (born 1995)

Personal information
- Born: December 19, 1995 (age 30) Prague, Czech Republic
- Education: Charles University in Prague
- Height: 1.70 m (5 ft 7 in)

Sport
- Sport: Athletics
- Event: 1500 m
- Club: TJ Dukla Praha
Medal record
Athletics
Representing Czech Republic
Summer Universiade
Silver medal – second place	2019 Naples	1500 m

Jan Friš (born 19 December 1995) is a Czech middle-distance runner specialising in the 1500 metres. He won the silver medal at the 2019 Summer Universiade.

== International competitions ==
Year	Competition	Venue	Position	Event	Notes
Representing the Czech Republic
2014	World Junior Championships	Eugene, United States	24th (h)	3000 m s'chase	9:20.52
2015	European Indoor Championships	Prague, Czech Republic	12th (h)	1500 m	3:47.16
2017	European Indoor Championships	Belgrade, Serbia	16th (h)	1500 m	3:50.38
2017	European U23 Championships	Bydgoszcz, Poland	22nd (h)	1500 m	3:47.73
2019	European Indoor Championships	Birmingham, United Kingdom	19th (h)	1500 m	3:49.59
2019	Universiade	Naples, Italy	2nd	1500 m	3:53.95
2019	Universiade	Naples, Italy	8th (h)	4 × 400 m relay	3:10.77
2021	European Indoor Championships	Toruń, Poland	11th	1500 m	3:42.97
2022	European Championships	Munich, Germany	19th (h)	1500 m	3:40.99
2023	European Indoor Championships	Istanbul, Turkey	8th	1500 m	3:40.86
2025	European Running Championships	Leuven, Belgium	38th	10 km	29:13

== Personal bests ==
Outdoor

- 800 metres – 1:46.32 (Kladno 2021)
- 1000 metres – 2:19.15 (Pliezhausen 2021)
- 1500 metres – 3:38.71 (Ostrava 2022)
- One mile – 4:01.41 (Ostrava 2019)
- 3000 metres – 8:03.54 (Pliezhausen 2019)
- 5000 metres – 14:16.75 (Opava 2020)
- 3000 metres steeplechase – 9:01.13 (Plzeň 2019)

Indoor

- 800 metres – 1:47.35 (Prague 2021)
- 1000 metres – 2:19.77 (Prague 2021)
- 1500 metres – 3:40.38 (Ostrava 2021)
- One mile – 4:01.35 (Ostrava 2023)
- 3000 metres – 7:57.72 (Ostrava 2021)
