= 2016 IAAF World U20 Championships – Men's 1500 metres =

The men's 1500 metres event at the 2016 IAAF World U20 Championships was held at Zdzisław Krzyszkowiak Stadium on 19 and 21 July.

== Medalists ==
Gold	Kumari Taki; Kenya
Silver	Taresa Tolosa; Ethiopia
Bronze	Anthony Kiptoo; Kenya

== Records ==
Standing records prior to the 2016 IAAF World U20 Championships in Athletics
World Junior Record	Ronald Kwemoi (KEN)	3:28.81	Monaco	18 July 2014
Championship Record	Abdalaati Iguider (MAR)	3:35.53	Grosseto, Italy	15 July 2004
World Junior Leading	Gilbert Kwemoi Soet (KEN)	3:33.71	Heusden-Zolder, Netherlands	16 July 2016

== Results ==
=== Heats ===
Qualification: First 3 of each heat (Q) and the 3 fastest times (q) qualified for the final.

Rank	Heat	Name	Nationality	Time	Note
1	1	Ayoub Sniba	Morocco	3:44.59	Q
2	1	Anthony Kiptoo	Kenya	3:44.74	Q
3	1	Josh Kerr	Great Britain	3:44.86	Q
4	1	Ajay Kumar Saroj	India	3:44.96	q
5	1	Matthew Ramsden	Australia	3:45.34	q
6	1	Asres Guadie	Ethiopia	3:45.74	q, PB
7	1	Yani Khelaf	France	3:45.88	
8	3	Taresa Tolosa	Ethiopia	3:46.13	Q
9	3	Baptiste Mischler	France	3:46.41	Q
10	3	Jakob Ingebrigtsen	Norway	3:46.53	Q
11	3	Ramazan Barbaros	Turkey	3:46.56	
12	2	Kumari Taki	Kenya	3:47.14	Q
13	1	Aggelos Vasiliou	Greece	3:47.38	
14	3	Abderezak Khelili	Algeria	3:47.56	PB
15	2	Elzan Bibić	Serbia	3:47.72	Q
16	2	Jordi Torrents	Spain	3:47.80	Q
17	2	Riadh Chninni	Tunisia	3:47.84	PB
18	3	Adrián Ben	Spain	3:47.88	
19	3	Diego Zarate	United States	3:47.95	
20	2	Isaac Hockey	Australia	3:48.63	
21	3	Ali Kaddachi	Tunisia	3:48.98	PB
22	2	Idriss Moussa Youssouf	Qatar	3:49.12	
23	3	Ryohei Sakaguchi	Japan	3:49.21	
24	1	Omer Öti	Turkey	3:49.24	
25	1	Lukas Abele	Germany	3:49.51	
26	3	Mark Patton	Canada	3:50.15	
27	3	Anton Hrabovskyi	Ukraine	3:50.58	
28	2	Emil Danielsson	Sweden	3:50.71	
29	3	Lorenzo Casini	Italy	3:50.97	
30	2	Kendall Muhammad	United States	3:51.27	
31	2	James Sugira	Rwanda	3:51.32	
32	2	Hicham Elkhayari	Morocco	3:51.64	
33	1	Abdallah Khelidj	Algeria	3:52.06	
34	1	Braydon Rennie	Canada	3:53.72	
35	1	Andriy Aliksiychuk	Ukraine	3:54.42	
36	2	Archie Davis	Great Britain	3:54.57	
37	3	Hugo Rocha	Portugal	3:54.76	
38	2	Andreas Holst Lindgreen	Denmark	3:55.21	
39	2	Andrea Baratte	Luxembourg	3:55.49	
40	2	Marvin Heinrich	Germany	3:58.49	
41	1	Adam Abdelwahab	Sudan	4:04.64	
	2	Abina Tchinga	Malawi	DNS	
	3	Mohamed Ismail Ibrahim	Djibouti	DNS	

=== Final ===
Rank	Name	Nationality	Time	Note
1st place, gold medalist(s)	Kumari Taki	Kenya	3:48.63	
2nd place, silver medalist(s)	Taresa Tolosa	Ethiopia	3:48.77	
3rd place, bronze medalist(s)	Anthony Kiptoo	Kenya	3:49.00	
4	Baptiste Mischler	France	3:49.52	
5	Ajay Kumar Saroj	India	3:49.52	
6	Matthew Ramsden	Australia	3:50.50	
7	Jordi Torrents	Spain	3:50.93	
8	Asres Guadie	Ethiopia	3:50.95	
9	Jakob Ingebrigtsen	Norway	3:51.09	
10	Josh Kerr	Great Britain	3:51.23	
11	Elzan Bibić	Serbia	3:51.58	
12	Ayoub Sniba	Morocco	3:55.95	
