= Johan Rogestedt =

Swedish middle-distance runner

Personal information
- Nationality: Swedish
- Born: 27 January 1993 (age 33)

Sport
- Sport: Running
- Event: Middle distances

Achievements and titles
- Personal best: 800m 1:45,89 1500m 3:40,78
Medal record
Men's athletics
Representing Sweden
European Junior Championships
Bronze medal – third place	2011 Tallinn	800 m
World Youth Championships
Gold medal – first place	2009 Brixen	800 m

Johan Rogestedt (born 27 January 1993) is a Swedish male middle distance runner.

He won the gold medal over 800 metres at the 2009 World Youth Championships in Athletics, becoming Sweden's first ever champion in that event.

Rogestedt finished tenth in the 1500 metres at the 2011 European Team Championships Super League in Stockholm.

In 2014 Rogestedt runs a personal best in the 800m on a time of 1.45,89 which is currently the third fastest time in Sweden of all time. At the PDE race in December 2014 Rogestedt started but did not finish.

== Competition record ==
Year	Competition	Venue	Position	Event	Notes
Representing Sweden
2009	World Youth Championships	Brixen, Italy	1st	800 m	1:50.92
2011	European Junior Championships	Tallinn, Estonia	3rd	800 m	1:47.88
2012	European Championships	Helsinki, Finland	29th (h)	800 m	1:48.86
2012	World Junior Championships	Barcelona, Spain	20th (h)	800 m	1:50.25
2013	European Indoor Championships	Gothenburg, Sweden	12th (sf)	800 m	1:55.98
2013	European U23 Championships	Tampere, Finland	24th (h)	800 m	1:52.81
2014	European Championships	Zürich, Switzerland	16th (sf)	800 m	1:53.70
2015	European Indoor Championships	Prague, Czech Republic	18th (h)	1500 m	3:48.88
2017	European Indoor Championships	Belgrade, Serbia	10th	1500 m	3:49.91
2018	European Championships	Berlin, Germany	23rd (h)	1500 m	3:49.73
2021	European Indoor Championships	Toruń, Poland	43rd (h)	1500 m	3:47.58
