= 2018 IAAF World U20 Championships – Men's 5000 metres =

Men's 5000 metres at the 2018 World U20 Championships
- Venue: Ratina Stadium
- Dates: 14 July
- Competitors: 22 from 17 nations
- Winning time: 13:20.16

Medalists
gold medal	Edward Pingua	Kenya
silver medal	Stanley Mburu	Kenya
bronze medal	Jakob Ingebrigtsen	Norway

The men's 5000 metres at the 2018 IAAF World U20 Championships was held at Ratina Stadium on 14 July.

== Records ==
Standing records prior to the 2018 IAAF World U20 Championships in Athletics
World Junior Record	Hagos Gebrhiwet (ETH)	12:47.53	Paris, France	6 July 2012
Championship Record	Abreham Cherkos (ETH)	13:08.57	Bydgoszcz, Poland	13 July 2008
World Junior Leading	Selemon Barega (ETH)	13:04.05	Stockholm, Sweden	10 June 2018

== Results ==
Rank	Name	Nationality	Time	Note
1	Edward Pingua	Kenya	13:20.16	
2	Stanley Mburu	Kenya	13:20.57	
3	Jakob Ingebrigtsen	Norway	13:20.78	AJR
4	Selemon Barega	Ethiopia	13:21.16	
5	Telahun Haile Bekele	Ethiopia	13:23.24	
6	Jacob Kiplimo	Uganda	13:23.35	
7	Oscar Chelimo	Uganda	14:00.68	
8	Elzan Bibić	Serbia	14:15.37	
9	Kokob Ghebru	Eritrea	14:23.49	
10	Cooper Teare	United States	14:24.30	
11	Simen Halle Haugen	Norway	14:25.37	
12	Aarón Las Heras	Spain	14:30.09	
13	Mohamed Mohumed	Germany	14:30.81	
14	Adrian Garcea	Romania	14:33.21	PB
15	Idleh Aden	Djibouti	14:33.35	PB
16	Thomas Mortimer	Great Britain	14:37.14	
17	Yuhi Nakaya	Japan	14:39.78	
18	Darragh McElhinney	Ireland	14:53.63	
19	Tyler Dozzi	Canada	15:31.39	
20	Soren Knudsen	United States	16:18.33	
	Yousif Ramadan	Sudan	DQ	
	Nursultan Keneshbekov	Kyrgyzstan	DNF	
