= Baptiste Mischler =

French middle-distance runner

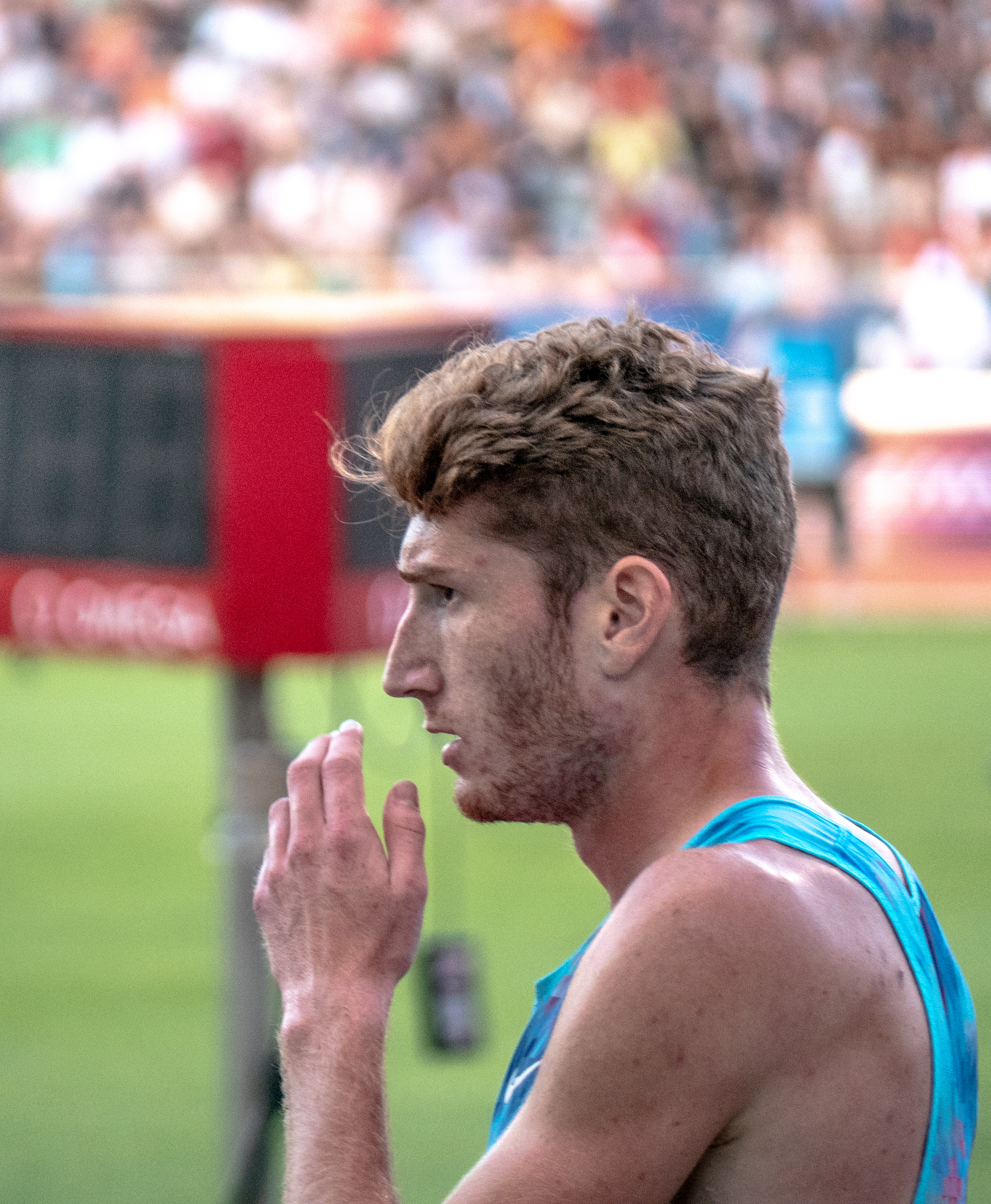
- Mischler in 2018

Personal information
- Born: 23 November 1997 (age 28) Haguenau, France
- Education: INSA Strasbourg
- Height: 1.83 m (6 ft 0 in)
- Weight: 66 kg (146 lb)

Sport
- Country: France
- Sport: Athletics
- Events: 800 m, 1500 m
- Club: Unitas Brumath
- Coached by: Steinmetz Hubert
Medal record
Men's athletics
Representing France
European Youth Olympic Festival
Gold medal – first place	2013 Utrecht	1500 m
European Junior Championships
Silver medal – second place	2015 Eskilstuna	1500 m

Baptiste Mischler (born 23 November 1997) is a French middle-distance runner. He won the silver medal in the 1500 metres at the 2015 European Junior Championships.

== International competitions ==
Year	Competition	Venue	Position	Event	Notes
Representing France
2013	European Youth Olympic Festival	Utrecht, Netherlands	1st	1500 m	3:57.38
2014	Youth Olympic Games	Nanjing, China	6th	1500 m	3:47.22
2015	European Junior Championships	Eskilstuna, Sweden	2nd	1500 m	3:49.88
2016	World U20 Championships	Bydgoszcz, Poland	4th	1500 m	3:49.52
2017	European U23 Championships	Bydgoszcz, Poland	5th	1500 m	3:49.76
2017	Universiade	Taipei, Taiwan	12th (sf)	800 m	1:49.07
2018	European Championships	Berlin, Germany	27th (h)	1500 m	3:50.96
2019	European U23 Championships	Gävle, Sweden	4th	1500 m	3:50.97
2021	European Indoor Championships	Toruń, Poland	21st (h)	1500 m	3:41.52
2021	Olympic Games	Tokyo, Japan	19th (h)	1500 m	3:37.53
2022	European Championships	Munich, Germany	14th (h)	1500 m	3:39.58

== Personal bests ==
Outdoor

- 800 metres – 1:47.17 (Mannheim 2016)
- 1000 metres – 2:18.23 (Monaco 2018)
- 1500 metres – 3:37.17 (Paris 2018)
