= Yuhi Nakaya =

Japanese long-distance runner

Personal information
- Born: 11 June 1999 (age 26)

Sport
- Country: Japan
- Sport: Long-distance running

Yuhi Nakaya (中谷 雄飛, Nakaya Yūhi; born 11 June 1999) is a Japanese long-distance runner. In 2019, he competed in the senior men's race at the 2019 IAAF World Cross Country Championships held in Aarhus, Denmark. He finished in 78th place.

In 2018, he finished in 17th place in the men's 5000 metres event at the 2018 IAAF World U20 Championships held in Tampere, Finland.
