= Adrián Ben =

Spanish middle-distance runner

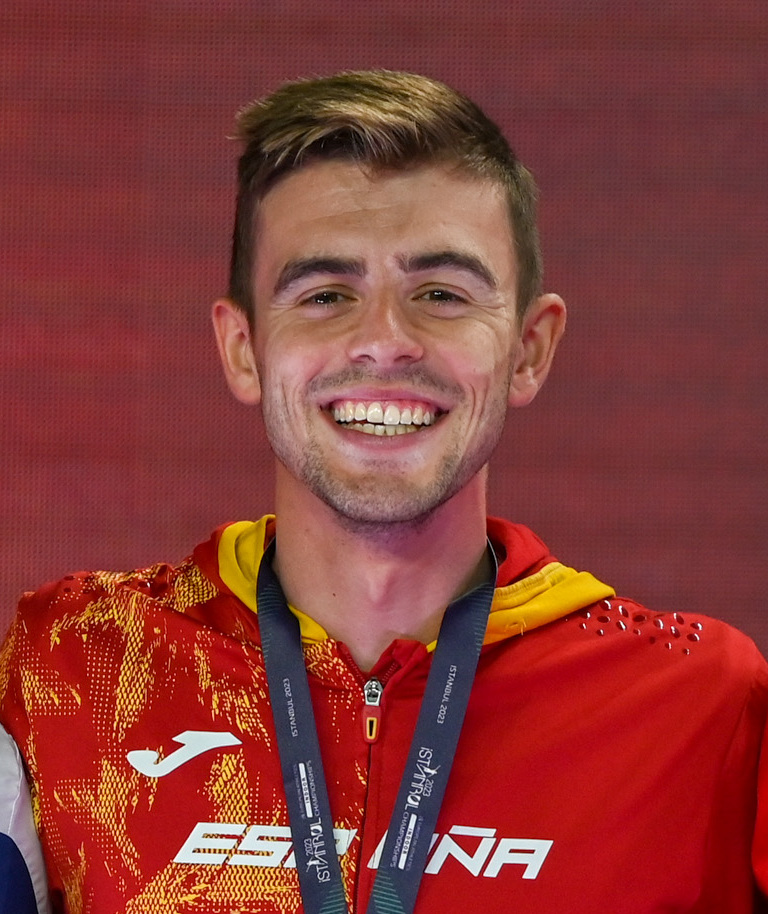
- Adrián Ben at the 2023 European Indoor Championships in Istanbul

Personal information
- Full name: Adrián Ben Montenegro
- Born: 4 August 1998 (age 28) Viveiro, Galicia, Spain
- Height: 1.79 m (5 ft 10 in)
- Weight: 64 kg (141 lb)

Sport
- Sport: Athletics
- Events: 800 metres, 1500 metres
- Club: F.C. Barcelona
- Team: C. A. Adidas
- Coached by: Arturo Martín
Medal record
Men's Athletics
Representing Spain
European Indoor Championships
Gold medal – first place	2023 Istanbul	800 m
European U20 Championships
Bronze medal – third place	2017 Grosseto	1500 m
European Cross Country Championships
Silver medal – second place	2022 Turin	Mixed relay

Adrián Ben Montenegro (born 4 August 1998) is a Spanish middle-distance runner specialising in the 800 metres and 1500 m. He won the gold medal in the 800 m at the 2023 European Indoor Championships.

Ben earned bronze in the 800 m at the 2017 European Under-20 Championships. He took one Spanish national title.

In 2017, he competed in the junior men's race at the 2017 World Cross Country Championships held in Kampala, Uganda.

== Statistics ==
=== International competitions ===
Representing Spain
Year	Competition	Venue	Position	Event	Time
2015	World Youth Championships	Cali, Colombia	6th	2000 m s'chase	5:45.59
2016	World U20 Championships	Bydgoszcz, Poland	18th (h)	1500 m	3:47.88
2017	World Cross Country Championships	Kampala, Uganda	74th	XC 7.858 km U20	27:15
2017	European U20 Championships	Grosseto, Italy	3rd	1500 m	3:57.32
2018	European Championships	Berlin, Germany	17th (h)	1500 m	3:42.81
2019	Mediterranean U23 Indoor Championships	Miramas, France	1st	1500 m	3:46.34
2019	European Indoor Championships	Glasgow, United Kingdom	14th (h)	1500 m	3:48.24
2019	European U23 Championships	Gävle, Sweden	13th (h)	1500 m	3:47.78
2019	World Championships	Doha, Qatar	6th	800 m	1:45.58
2021	Olympic Games	Tokyo, Japan	5th	800 m	1:45.96
2022	World Championships	Eugene, United States	25th (h)	800 m	1:46.70
2022	European Championships	Munich, Germany	15th (sf)	800 m	1:49.26
2022	European Cross Country Championships	Turin, Italy	2nd	XC mixed relay	17:24
2023	European Indoor Championships	Istanbul, Turkey	1st	800 m	1:47.34
2023	European Games	Chorzów, Poland	10th	800 m	1:47.36
2023	World Championships	Budapest, Hungary	4th	800 m	1:44.91
2024	European Championships	Rome, Italy	6th	800 m	1:46.54
2024	Olympic Games	Paris, France	8th (rep)	800 m	1:45.37
2025	World Indoor Championships	Nanjing, China	6th	1500 m	3:39.96
2025	World Championships	Tokyo, Japan	8th	1500 m	3:35.38
2026	European Championships	Birmingham, United Kingdom	20th (h)	1500 m	3:42.52

=== Personal bests ===
- 800 metres – 1:43.92 (Budapest, 2023)
  - 800 metres indoor – 1:45.39 (Madrid, 2025)
- 1500 metres – 3:31.70 (Pfungstadt, 2025)
  - 1500 metres indoor – 3:36.95 (Nanjing, 2025)
- 3000 metres – 8:00.42 (Baie Mahault, 2018)
  - 3000 metres indoor – 7:55.75 (Valencia, 2021)

=== National titles ===
- Spanish Athletics Championships
  - 800 metres: 2021, 2023
