= Mikkel Dahl-Jessen =

Danish long-distance runner

Personal information
- Born: 20 December 1994 (age 31)

Sport
- Country: Denmark
- Sport: Long-distance running

Achievements and titles
- Personal bests: Outdoor; 800 m: 1:51.56 (Aarhus 2019); 1500 m: 3:41.32 (Brussels 2019); Mile: 4:03.20 (Dublin 2019); 3000 m: 7:58.43 (Randers 2020); 5000 m: 13:40.78 (Oordegem 2021); 5K (road): 14:05 (Monaco 2020); 10K (road): 29:53 (Værløse 2021); Indoor; 1500 m: 3:43.5h (Randers 2021); 3000 m: 7:55.12 (Ghent 2021)

Mikkel Dahl-Jessen (born 20 December 1994) is a Danish middle-distance and long-distance runner.

In 2017, Dahl-Jessen competed in the senior men's race at the 2017 IAAF World Cross Country Championships held in Kampala, Uganda. He finished in 102nd place. In the same year, he also represented Denmark at the 2017 Summer Universiade held in Taipei, Taiwan in the men's 1500 metres event. He did not qualify to compete in the final.

In 2019, Dahl-Jessen competed in the senior men's race at the 2019 IAAF World Cross Country Championships held in Aarhus, Denmark. He finished in 104th place. In the same year, he also represented Denmark at the 2019 Summer Universiade held in Naples, Italy. He finished in 8th place in the men's 1500 metres.

In 2021, he competed in the men's 3000 metres event at the 2021 European Athletics Indoor Championships held in Toruń, Poland.
