= Adrian Garcea =

Romanian long-distance runner

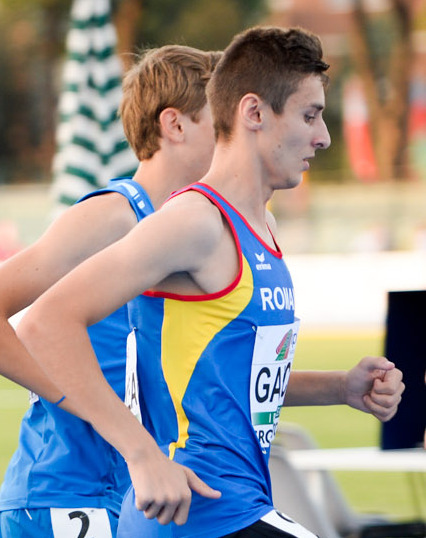

Personal information
- Born: 1 June 1999 (age 26)

Sport
- Country: Romania
- Sport: Long-distance running

Adrian Garcea (born 1 June 1999) is a Romanian long-distance runner.

In 2018, he finished in 14th place in the men's 5000 metres event at the 2018 IAAF World U20 Championships held in Tampere, Finland. He also competed in the men's 1500 metres event where he was disqualified after infringement of the inside border.

In 2019, he competed in the senior men's race at the 2019 IAAF World Cross Country Championships held in Aarhus, Denmark. He finished in 118th place. In the same year, he also competed in the men's 1500 metres event at the 2019 European Athletics U23 Championships held in Gävle, Sweden. He did not qualify to compete in the final.
