= 2018 IAAF World U20 Championships – Men's 1500 metres =

Men's 1500 metres at the 2018 World U20 Championships
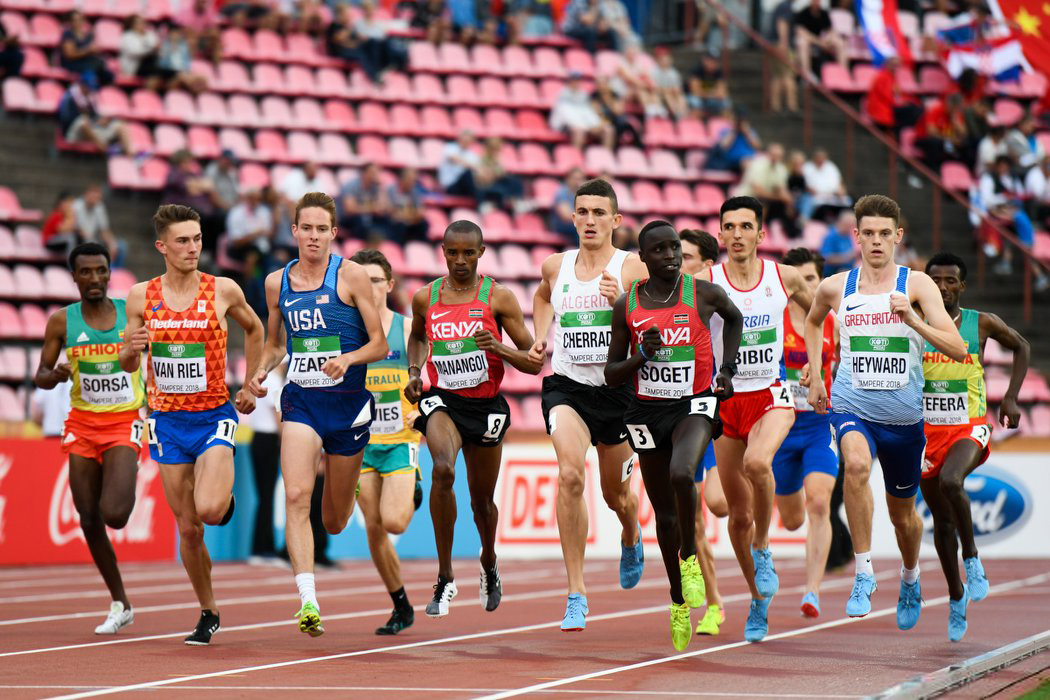
- The final
- Venue: Ratina Stadium
- Dates: 10 and 12 July
- Competitors: 37 from 27 nations
- Winning time: 3:41.71

Medalists
gold medal	George Meitamei Manangoi	Kenya
silver medal	Jakob Ingebrigtsen	Norway
bronze medal	Justus Soget	Kenya

The men's 1500 metres at the 2018 IAAF World U20 Championships was held at Ratina Stadium on 10 and 12 July.

== Records ==
Standing records prior to the 2018 IAAF World U20 Championships in Athletics
World U20 Record	Ronald Kwemoi (KEN)	3:28.81	Monaco	18 July 2014
Championship Record	Abdalaati Iguider (MAR)	3:35.53	Grosseto, Italy	15 July 2004
World U20 Leading	Samuel Tefera (ETH)	3:31.63	Shanghai, China	12 May 2018

== Results ==
=== Heats ===
Qualification: First 3 of each heat (Q) and the 3 fastest times (q) qualified for the final.

Rank	Heat	Name	Nationality	Time	Note
1	3	Samuel Tefera	Ethiopia	3:44.48	Q
2	3	Elzan Bibić	Serbia	3:44.68	Q, PB
3	2	Justus Soget	Kenya	3:44.70	Q
4	2	Birhanu Sorsa	Ethiopia	3:44.92	Q
5	2	Cooper Teare	United States	3:45.06	Q
6	3	Jake Heyward	Great Britain	3:45.45	Q
7	2	Robin van Riel	Netherlands	3:45.52	q
8	2	Sondre Juven	Norway	3:45.64	q
9	3	Callum Davies	Australia	3:46.32	q, PB
10	3	Enrique Herreros	Spain	3:46.66	
11	3	Hosea Kiplangat	Uganda	3:46.66	
12	2	Anass Essayi	Morocco	3:46.68	
13	2	Samuel Tanner	New Zealand	3:47.10	
14	2	Jaryd Clifford	Australia	3:47.77	
15	3	Bram Anderiessen	Netherlands	3:47.96	
16	3	Yared Nuguse	United States	3:49.68	
17	1	Jakob Ingebrigtsen	Norway	3:51.34	Q
18	1	George Meitamei Manangoi	Kenya	3:51.40	Q
19	3	Maximilian Sluka	Germany	3:51.92	
20	1	Oussama Cherrad	Algeria	3:52.33	Q
21	3	Isaiah Priddey	New Zealand	3:52.42	
22	1	Mario García	Spain	3:52.70	
23	1	Daniel Weldetnsae	Eritrea	3:53.06	
24	1	Szymon Żywko	Poland	3:54.02	
25	2	Hussein Haitham Lafta	Iraq	3:54.09	
26	1	Quentin Malriq	France	3:54.46	
27	3	Georgios Panagiotis Miliaras	Greece	3:54.62	
28	1	Soufiane Hamdaoui	Morocco	3:54.90	
29	1	William Devantier	Denmark	3:55.33	
30	2	Daniel Kiprop	Uganda	3:55.47	
31	1	Jonathan Schmidt	Germany	3:55.56	
32	1	Pietro Arese	Italy	3:55.92	
33	1	Charlie Dannatt	Canada	3:56.55	
34	2	Rabie Deliba	Algeria	3:58.32	
35	1	Dominic Lokolong Atiol	Athlete Refugee Team	3:59.63	PB
36	3	Ankit	India	4:05.15	
37	3	Evan Jones	U.S. Virgin Islands	4:07.91	
38	2	Simanga Maseko	Eswatini	4:09.15	PB
	2	Adrian Garcea	Romania	DQ	

=== Final ===
Rank	Name	Nationality	Time	Note
1st place, gold medalist(s)	George Meitamei Manangoi	Kenya	3:41.71	
2nd place, silver medalist(s)	Jakob Ingebrigtsen	Norway	3:41.89	
3rd place, bronze medalist(s)	Justus Soget	Kenya	3:42.14	
4	Jake Heyward	Great Britain	3:43.76	
5	Samuel Tefera	Ethiopia	3:43.91	
6	Elzan Bibić	Serbia	3:44.65	PB
7	Oussama Cherrad	Algeria	3:45.17	
8	Sondre Juven	Norway	3:45.40	
9	Birhanu Sorsa	Ethiopia	3:45.47	
10	Cooper Teare	United States	3:46.18	
11	Callum Davies	Australia	3:46.35	
12	Robin van Riel	Netherlands	3:48.65	
