= Jesús Gómez (runner) =

Spanish middle-distance runner

Personal information
- Full name: Jesús Gómez Santiago
- Born: 24 April 1991 (age 35) Burgos, Spain
- Height: 1.82 m (6 ft 0 in)
- Weight: 70 kg (154 lb)

Sport
- Country: Spain
- Sport: Athletics
- Event: 1500 metres
- Club: CD Nike Running
- Coached by: José Anastasio Vallejo
Medal record
Men's athletics
Representing Spain
European Indoor Championships
Bronze medal – third place	2019 Glasgow	1500 m
Bronze medal – third place	2021 Toruń	1500 m
European Cross Country Championships
Bronze medal – third place	2017 Šamorín	Mixed relay

Jesús Gómez Santiago (born 24 April 1991) is a Spanish middle-distance runner. He won bronze medals in the 1500 metres at the 2019 and 2021 European Indoor Championships.

Gómez is a four-time Spanish national champion.

== International competitions ==
Representing Spain
Year	Competition	Venue	Position	Event	Time
2017	European Cross Country Championships	Šamorín, Slovakia	3rd	Mixed relay	18:26
2018	Mediterranean Games	Tarragona, Spain	7th	1500 m	3:40.43
2019	European Indoor Championships	Glasgow, United Kingdom	3rd	1500 m	3:44.39
2019	World Championships	Doha, Qatar	24th (s)	1500 m	3:40.29
2021	European Indoor Championships	Toruń, Poland	3rd	1500 m	3:38.47
2021	Olympic Games	Tokyo, Japan	23rd (sf)	1500 m	3:44.46
2023	European Indoor Championships	Istanbul, Turkey	4th	1500 m	3:38.11

== Personal bests ==
- 800 metres – 1:45.67 (Madrid 2017)
  - 800 metres indoor – 1:47.93 (Sabadell 2019)
- 1500 metres – 3:33.07 (Monaco 2020)
  - 1500 metres indoor – 3:36.32 (Madrid 2021)
- 3000 metres – 7:54.46 (Castellón 2020)
  - 3000 metres indoor – 7:48.76 (Valencia 2019)

Road

- 10 kilometres – 30:08 (Jaén 2020)
