= 2018 African Championships in Athletics – Men's 5000 metres =

The men's 5000 metres event at the 2018 African Championships in Athletics was held on 5 August in Asaba, Nigeria.

== Results ==
Rank	Athlete	Nationality	Time	Notes
1st place, gold medalist(s)	Edward Zakayo	Kenya	13:48.58	
2nd place, silver medalist(s)	Getaneh Molla	Ethiopia	13:49.06	
3rd place, bronze medalist(s)	Yemane Haileselassie	Eritrea	13:49.58	
4	Selemon Barega	Ethiopia	13:52.27	
5	Cyrus Rutto	Kenya	13:53.78	
6	Soufiyan Bouqantar	Morocco	13:53.99	
7	Younès Essalhi	Morocco	13:58.64	
8	Stephen Kissa	Uganda	13:59.90	
9	Haymanot Alew	Ethiopia	14:00.67	
10	Rodrigue Kwizera	Burundi	14:00.88	
11	Dominic Lokinyomo Lobalu	ART	14:07.22	
12	Mehari Tesfai	Eritrea	14:11.23	
13	Ibrahim Hassan Bouh	Djibouti	14:15.25	
14	Kevin Kibet	Uganda	14:17.45	
15	Elroy Gelant	South Africa	14:20.37	
16	Yahya Adam Abdelmunaim	Sudan	14:21.77	
17	David Kulang	South Sudan	14:22.84	
18	Siboniso Soldaka	South Africa	14:47.25	
19	Ali Mahamat	Chad	14:59.67	
20	Ukuk Otho'o Bul	ART	15:01.50	
21	Mahamadal Fadal Adamou Abdou	Niger	15:15.37	
22	Valentin Betoudji	Chad	15:18.41	
	Raouf Boubaker	Tunisia	DNS	
	Jach Majok Wol	South Sudan	DNS	
	Thierry Ndikumwenayo	Burundi	DNS	
	Toka Badboy	Lesotho	DNS	
	Alex Franck Cliford Ngouari-Mouissi	Republic of the Congo	DNS	
	Agustino Sulle	Tanzania	DNS	
	Jonathan Ndivi	Kenya	DNS	
	Gabriel Geay	Tanzania	DNS	
