= 2021 European Athletics Indoor Championships – Men's 1500 metres =

Athletic race

Men's 1500 metres at the 2021 European Athletics Indoor Championships
- Venue: Arena Toruń
- Location: Toruń, Poland
- Dates: 4 March 2021 (round 1); 5 March 2021 (final)
- Competitors: 51 from 21 nations
- Winning time: 3:37.56

Medalists
gold medal	Jakob Ingebrigtsen	Norway
silver medal	Marcin Lewandowski	Poland
bronze medal	Jesús Gómez	Spain

The men's 1500 metres event at the 2021 European Athletics Indoor Championships was held on 4 March 2021 at 20:20 (heats), and on 5 March at 21:35 (final) local time.

Ingebrigtsen was initially disqualified for stepping out of the lane. Subsequently, the jury accepted the Norwegian team's appeal, as Ingebrigtsen had been forced to foul because he was closed by the two Polish, but had not gained any advantage from this.

== Records ==
Standing records prior to the 2021 European Athletics Indoor Championships
World record	Samuel Tefera (ETH)	3:31.04	Birmingham, United Kingdom	16 February 2019
European record	Jakob Ingebrigtsen (NOR)	3:31.80	Liévin, France	9 February 2021
Championship record	Ivan Heshko (UKR)	3:36.70	Madrid, Spain	6 March 2005
World Leading	Jakob Ingebrigtsen (NOR)	3:31.80	Liévin, France	9 February 2021
European Leading	Jakob Ingebrigtsen (NOR)	3:31.80	Liévin, France	9 February 2021

== Results ==
=== Heats ===
Qualification: First 2 in each heat (Q) and the next 4 fastest (q) advance to the Final.

Rank	Heat	Athlete	Nationality	Time	Note
1	2	Ignacio Fontes	Spain	3:38.68	Q
2	2	Piers Copeland	Great Britain	3:38.88	Q
3	2	Andrew Coscoran	Ireland	3:39.00	q
4	2	István Szögi	Hungary	3:39.10	q
5	4	Marcin Lewandowski	Poland	3:39.78	Q
6	3	Neil Gourley	Great Britain	3:39.84	Q
7	3	Jakob Ingebrigtsen	Norway	3:39.89	Q
8	4	Filip Sasínek	Czech Republic	3:40.04	Q
9	4	Paul Robinson	Ireland	3:40.07	q
10	4	Stijn Baeten	Belgium	3:40.40	q
11	1	Jesús Gómez	Spain	3:40.75	Q
12	1	Michał Rozmys	Poland	3:40.92	Q
13	3	Jan Friš	Czech Republic	3:40.99	qR
14	1	Charles Grethen	Luxembourg	3:41.07	
15	3	Andreas Holst Lindgreen	Denmark	3:41.25	PB
16	3	Luke McCann	Ireland	3:41.25	
17	3	Karl Bebendorf	Germany	3:41.29	
18	4	Joonas Rinne	Finland	3:41.40	PB
19	4	Archie Davis	Great Britain	3:41.40	SB
20	1	Filip Ingebrigtsen	Norway	3:41.52	
21	1	Baptiste Mischler	France	3:41.52	
22	2	Azeddine Habz	France	3:41.55	
23	2	Jacob Boutera	Norway	3:41.69	PB
24	3	Bram Anderiessen	Netherlands	3:42.13	
25	1	Simas Bertašius	Lithuania	3:42.17	
26	3	Mitko Tsenov	Bulgaria	3:42.21	PB
27	1	Valentijn Weinans	Netherlands	3:42.34	
28	3	Nuno Pereira	Portugal	3:42.38	
29	2	Homiyu Tesfaye	Germany	3:42.59	
30	1	Oussama Lonneux	Belgium	3:42.68	
31	3	Pietro Arese	Italy	3:43.55	
32	2	Mikael Johnsen	Denmark	3:43.76	
33	3	Andreas Dimitrakis	Greece	3:44.05	
34	2	Isaac Nader	Portugal	3:44.15	
35	1	Leo Magnusson	Sweden	3:44.37	
36	4	Marius Probst	Germany	3:44.63	
37	1	Joao Bussotti	Italy	3:44.76	
38	4	Simon Denissel	France	3:44.94	
39	2	Adam Czerwiński	Poland	3:45.13	
40	4	Márton Pápai	Hungary	3:45.63	
41	4	Federico Riva	Italy	3:45.85	
42	1	Artem Alfimov	Ukraine	3:46.05	
43	2	Johan Rogestedt	Sweden	3:47.58	
44	3	Samuel Pihlström	Sweden	3:47.66	
45	3	Gergő Kiss	Hungary	3:47.96	
46	2	Mahadi Abdi Ali	Netherlands	3:48.02	
47	4	Abderrahman El Khayami	Spain	3:49.34	
48	1	Kristian Uldbjerg Hansen	Denmark	3:50.18	
49	4	José Carlos Pinto	Portugal	3:56.44	
50	4	Bob Bertemes	Luxembourg	3:58.08	
	2	Michael Somers	Belgium	DQ	

=== Final ===
Rank	Name	Nationality	Time	Notes
1st place, gold medalist(s)	Jakob Ingebrigtsen	Norway	3:37.56	
2nd place, silver medalist(s)	Marcin Lewandowski	Poland	3:38.06	
3rd place, bronze medalist(s)	Jesús Gómez	Spain	3:38.47	
4	Ignacio Fontes	Spain	3:39.66	
5	Piers Copeland	Great Britain	3:39.99	
6	Michał Rozmys	Poland	3:40.11	
7	Andrew Coscoran	Ireland	3:40.38	
8	István Szögi	Hungary	3:40.40	
9	Filip Sasínek	Czech Republic	3:40.64	
10	Paul Robinson	Ireland	3:40.74	
11	Jan Friš	Czech Republic	3:42.97	
12	Neil Gourley	Great Britain	3:45.99	
13	Stijn Baeten	Belgium	3:46.31	
