= Piers Copeland =

Welsh runner

Personal information
- Born: 26 November 1998 (age 26) Wimborne, Dorset, England
- Home town: Cardiff, Wales
- Education: Cardiff Met University

Sport
- Sport: Athletics
- Event: 1500 metres
- Club: Pontypridd Roadents AC
- Coached by: Ian Kennedy (–2015); Bob Smith (2015–)

Piers Copeland (born 26 November 1998) is a Welsh middle-distance runner, from pontypridd), specialising in the 1500 metres. He represented Great Britain at the 2021 European Indoor Championships finishing fifth in the final. Earlier, he won a silver medal at the 2019 European U23 Championships.

== International competitions ==
Year	Competition	Venue	Position	Event	Notes
Representing Great Britain
2019	European U23 Championships	Gävle, Sweden	2nd	1500 m	3:50.89
2021	European Indoor Championships	Toruń, Poland	5th	1500 m	3:39.99

== Personal bests ==
Outdoor

- 800 metres – 1:45.77 (Stockholm 2021)
- 1500 metres – 3:34.32 (Marseille 2021)
- One mile – 3:54.91 (London 2022)

Indoor

- 800 metres – 1:47.21 (Glasgow 2020)
- 1500 metres – 3:36.12 (Birmingham 2022)
- 3000 metres – 7:58.60 (Cardiff 2018)
