= 2019 European Athletics U23 Championships – Men's 1500 metres =

1500 metre running race

The men's 1500 metres event at the 2019 European Athletics U23 Championships was held in Gävle, Sweden, at Gavlehof Stadium Park on 11 and 13 July.

== Medalists ==
Gold	Ignacio Fontes	Spain	3:50.38
Silver	Piers Copeland	Great Britain	3:50.89
Bronze	Elzan Bibić	Serbia	3:50.90

== Results ==
=== Qualifying rounds ===
Thursday, July 11, 2019, 13:00 CET

Qualification rule: First 4 (Q) and the next 4 fastest (q) qualified for the semifinals.

Rank	Heat	Name	Nationality	Time	Notes
1	2	Jake Heyward	Great Britain	3:47.08	Q
2	2	Enrique Herreros	Spain	3:47.13	Q
3	2	Tom Elmer	Switzerland	3:47.17	Q
4	2	Baptiste Mischler	France	3:47.26	Q
5	2	Pierrik Jocteur-Monrozier	France	3:47.37	q
5	2	Martin Prodanov	Bulgaria	3:47.37	q
7	2	Ossama Meslek	Italy	3:47.58	q
8	1	Elzan Bibić	Serbia	3:47.61	Q
9	2	Patryk Kozłowski	Poland	3:47.69	q
10	1	Ignacio Fontes	Spain	3:47.71	Q
11	1	Piers Copeland	Great Britain	3:47.72	Q
12	1	Pietro Arese	Italy	3:47.74	Q
13	1	Adrián Ben	Spain	3:47.78	
14	2	Márk Vőrős	Hungary	3:48.50	
15	1	Marvin Heinrich	Germany	3:49.03	
16	1	Bram Anderiessen	Netherlands	3:49.14	
17	2	Cathal Doyle	Ireland	3:49.25	
18	2	Andreas Holst Lindgreen	Denmark	3:49.32	
19	1	Mats Hauge	Norway	3:49.52	
20	1	Adam Włodarczyk	Poland	3:50.09	
21	2	Artem Alfimov	Ukraine	3:50.94	
22	1	Isaac Nader	Portugal	3:51.60	
23	1	Anton Hrabovskyy	Ukraine	3:51.64	
24	2	Luis Monteiro	Portugal	3:52.67	
25	2	Andriy Aliksiychuk	Ukraine	3:54.71	
26	1	Abdurrahman Gediklioğlu	Turkey	3:57.92	
27	1	Adrian Garcea	Romania	4:00.17	
	1	Luke McCann	Ireland	DQ	R163.2(b)

=== Final ===
Thursday, July 13, 2019, 12:20 CET

Rank	Name	Nationality	Time
1st place, gold medalist(s)	Ignacio Fontes	Spain	3:50.38
2nd place, silver medalist(s)	Piers Copeland	Great Britain	3:50.89
3rd place, bronze medalist(s)	Elzan Bibić	Serbia	3:50.90
4	Baptiste Mischler	France	3:50.97
5	Pierrik Jocteur-Monrozier	France	3:50.98
6	Enrique Herreros	Spain	3:51.30
7	Martin Prodanov	Bulgaria	3:51.65
8	Ossama Meslek	Italy	3:51.97
9	Tom Elmer	Switzerland	3:52.19
10	Patryk Kozłowski	Poland	3:52.93
11	Jake Heyward	Great Britain	3:52.98
12	Pietro Arese	Italy	3:54.20
