= Kalle Berglund =

Swedish middle-distance runner

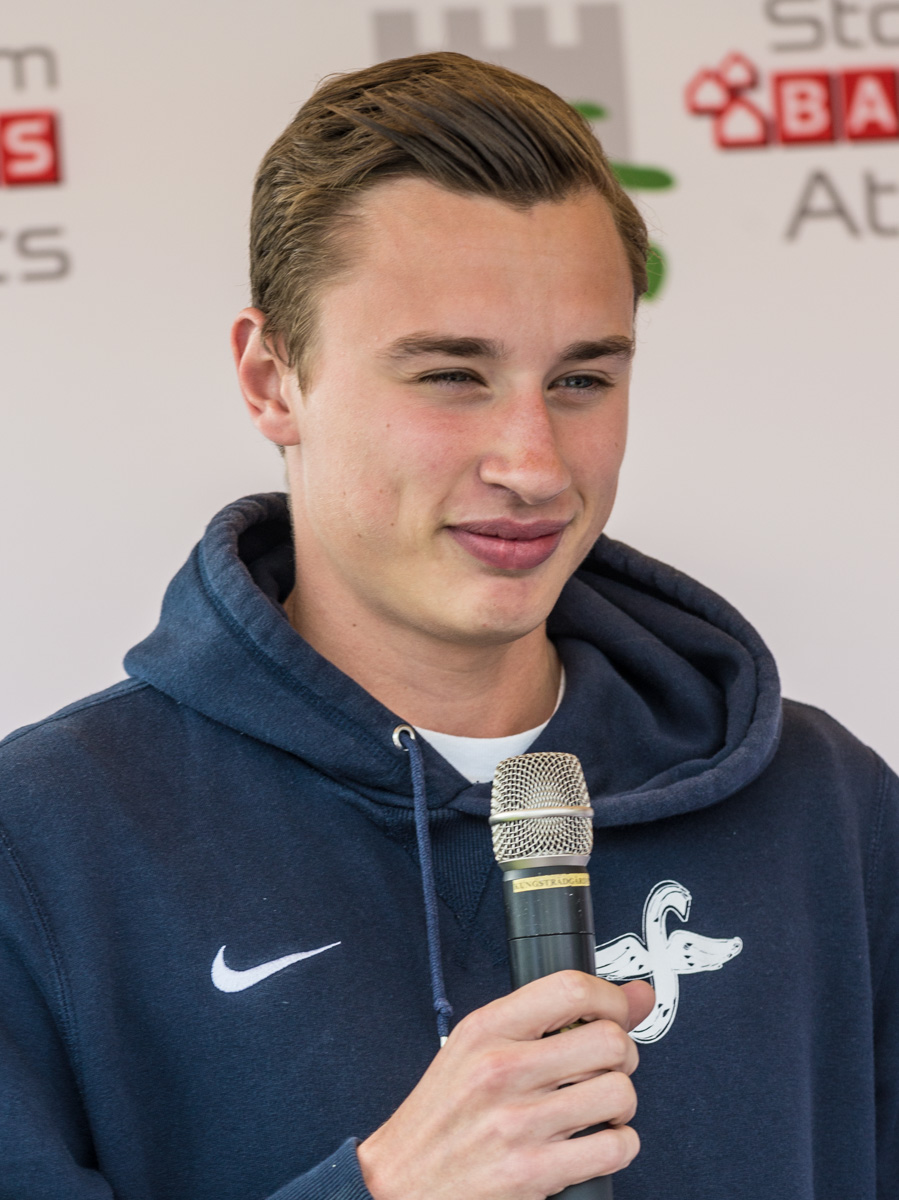
- Kalle Berglund in July 2015

Personal information
- Born: 11 March 1996 (age 30) Jämshög, Sweden
- Height: 1.79 m (5 ft 10 in)
- Weight: 62 kg (137 lb)

Sport
- Sport: Athletics
- Events: 800 m, 1500 m
- Club: Spårvägens FK
- Coached by: Jan Bengtsson
Medal record
Men's athletics
Representing Sweden
European Indoor Championships
Silver medal – second place	2017 Belgrade	1500 m
European Team Championships
Silver medal – second place	2019 Bydgoszcz	3000 m

Kalle Anders Berglund (born 11 March 1996 in Jämshög) is a Swedish middle-distance runner. He won the silver medal in the 1500 metres at the 2017 European Indoor Championships.

During the Bislett Games in Oslo on 13 June 2019, he broke the Swedish record on the one English mile (1609 metres) distance with the time 3.53,83 minutes. With that, he broke Anders Gärderud's record on the same distance, which was 3.54,45 minutes.

== International competitions ==
Year	Competition	Venue	Position	Event	Notes
Representing Sweden
2014	World Junior Championships	Eugene, United States	7th	800 m	1:47.31
2015	European Junior Championships	Eskilstuna, Sweden	4th	800 m	1:49.88
2016	European Championships	Amsterdam, Netherlands	18th (h)	800 m	1:49.65
2017	European Indoor Championships	Belgrade, Serbia	2nd	1500 m	3:45.56
2017	European U23 Championships	Bydgoszcz, Poland	13th (h)	1500 m	3:44.56
2017	World Championships	London, United Kingdom	11th (sf)	1500 m	3:40.05
2018	World Indoor Championships	Birmingham, United Kingdom	11th (h)	1500 m	3:46.61
2018	European Championships	Berlin, Germany	11th (h)	1500 m	3:41.25
2019	World Championships	Doha, Qatar	9th	1500 m	3:33.70
2019	European Team Championships Super League	Bydgoszcz, Poland	2nd	1500 m	8:02.79
2021	Olympic Games	Tokyo, Japan	41st (h)	1500 m	3:49.43

== Personal bests ==
Outdoor

- 400 metres – 48.20 (Espoo 2015)
- 800 metres – 1:46.85 (Cheboksary 2015)
- 1000 metres – 2:19.21 (Stockholm 2018)
- 1500 metres – 3:33.70 (Doha 2019) NR
- One Mile – 3:53.83 (Oslo 2019)NR

Indoor

- 400 metres – 51.19 (Karlskrona 2013)
- 800 metres – 1:47.62 (Växjö 2017)
- 1500 metres – 3:36.63 (Toruń 2019) NR
- One mile – 4:01.00 (Athlone 2018)
- 3000 metres – 7:57.78 (Växjö 2020)

== National titles ==
- Swedish Athletics Championships (5)
  - 1500 metres: 2015, 2016, 2018, 2019
  - 5000 metres: 2018
- Swedish Indoor Athletics Championships (1)
  - 1500 metres: 2018

== See also ==
- List of Swedish records in athletics
- Sweden at the Olympics
