= Elzan Bibić =

Serbian runner (born 1999)

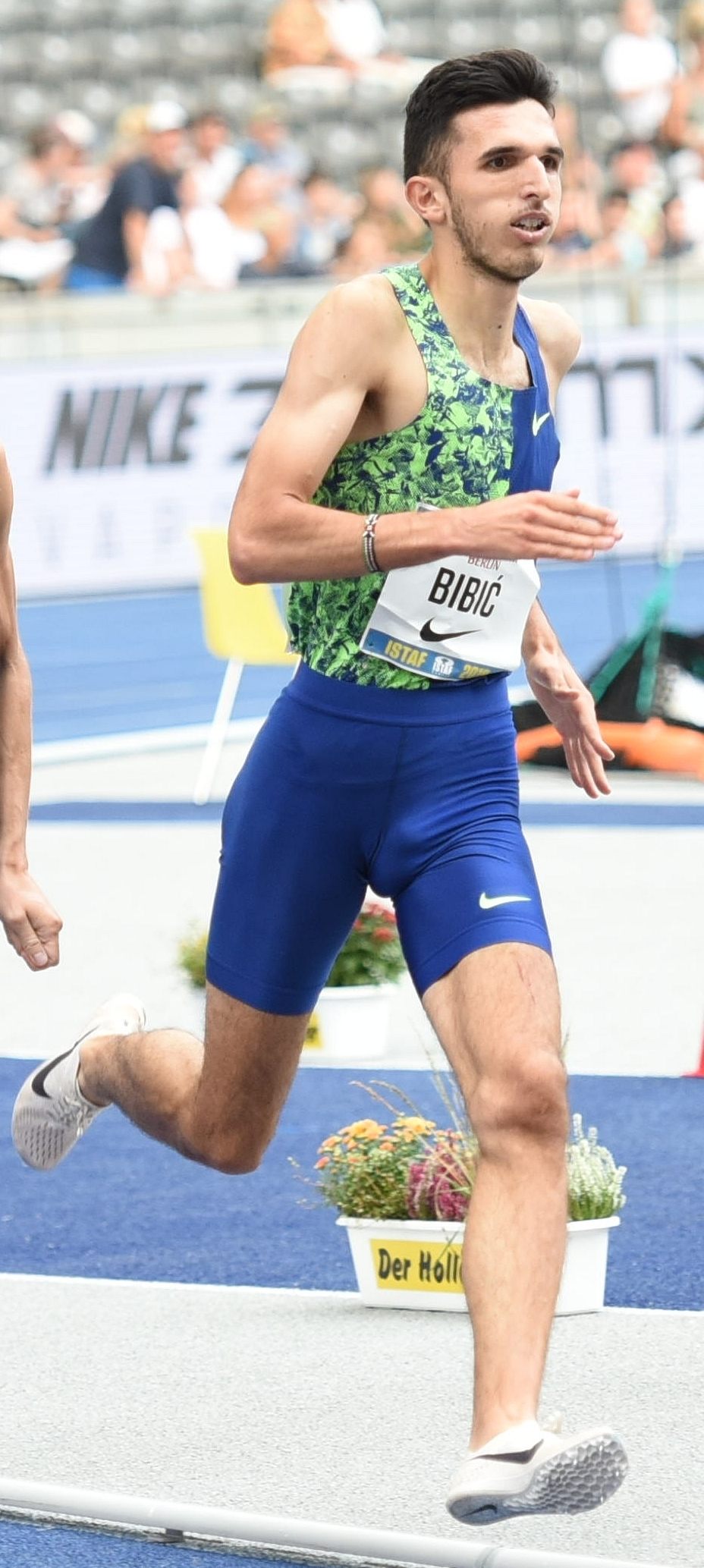
- Bibić at the ISTAF Berlin in 2019

Personal information
- Nationality: Serbian
- Born: 8 January 1999 (age 27) Karajukića Bunari, Sjenica, FR Yugoslavia
- Height: 1.97 m (6 ft 6 in)
- Weight: 70 kg (154 lb)

Sport
- Country: Serbia
- Sport: Athletics
- Event: 1500 m – 5000 m
- Coached by: Rifat Zilkić

Achievements and titles
- Personal bests: 1500 m: 3:35.07; 5000 m: 13:13.06
Medal record
Men's athletics
Representing Serbia
European Indoor Championships
Bronze medal – third place	2023 Istanbul	3000 m
European U23 Championships
Bronze medal – third place	2019 Gävle	1500 m
European Youth Olympic Festival
Gold medal – first place	2015 Tbilisi	3000 m
Silver medal – second place	2015 Tbilisi	1500 m
European Youth Championships
Gold medal – first place	2016 Tbilisi	3000 m
European Cross Country Championships
Bronze medal – third place	2018 Szentendre	Junior race

Elzan Bibić (Serbian Cyrillic: Елзан Бибић; born 8 January 1999) is a Serbian middle- and long-distance runner. He won the bronze medal in the 1500 metres at the 2019 European Under-23 Championships.

Bibić was the 3000 metres 2016 European youth champion and won a bronze for the men's junior race at the 2018 European Cross Country Championships. He earned several Serbian national titles both out and indoors (1500 m and 3000 m).

Bibić won the bronze medal in the event at the 2023 European Indoor Championships.

== Running career ==
Bibić initially played soccer before training as a distance runner. He won the boys' 3000-meter race at the 2015 European Youth Summer Olympic Festival with a time of 8:50.10.

"I discovered [Elzan] by chance, like dear God sent him. I know everyone else is surprised at his latest results, but I'm not in the slightest. I didn't doubt he was going to win in Tbilisi in the 3000 meters, maybe he could have won in the 1500." -Bibić's coach, Rifat Zilkić in August 2015.

On July 7, 2017, he won a 3000-meter race at a track meet in Zenica, after which he felt knee pain. Shortly afterwards he was diagnosed with damaged ligaments in his knee, his first serious injury.

On September 4, 2018, Bibić ran his then personal best of 3:37.79 (and still reigning Serbian U20 national record) in the men's 1500 meters at the Hanžeković Memorial meet in Zagreb, finishing in last place among a deep international field led by first place finisher Elijah Manangoi.

In the 2022 World Athletics Indoor Championships in Belgrade he finished 6th in the Heat 2 of 3000 meter race with the time of 7:52.78 and did not progress to the finals.

== Personal life ==
Bibić was born in Karajukića Bunari, known as the "Siberia" of Serbia due to extremely cold temperatures which are frequently recorded there. Karajukića Bunari is above 1,000 meters in altitude, as it is located on a plateau called Pešter. His parents were athletes growing up. His father Murat played soccer and his mother Fatima played volleyball. Bibić went to a medical trade school in his hometown, Novi Pazar. He is a member of the Sports Unit of the Military Academy of the University of Defence.

== International competitions ==
Representing Serbia
Year	Competition	Venue	Position	Event	Result
2015	European Youth Olympic Festival	Tbilisi, Georgia	2nd	1500 m	4:01.62
2015	European Youth Olympic Festival	Tbilisi, Georgia	1st	3000 m	8:50.10
2016	Balkan Indoor Championships	Istanbul, Turkey	1st	3000 m	8:16.72
2016	European Youth Championships	Tbilisi, Georgia	8th	800 m	1:56.12
2016	European Youth Championships	Tbilisi, Georgia	1st	3000 m	8:09.06
2016	World U20 Championships	Bydgoszcz, Poland	11th	1500 m	3:51.58
2016	World U20 Championships	Bydgoszcz, Poland	8th	5000 m	13:51.40
2017	Balkan Indoor Championships	Belgrade, Serbia	1st	3000 m	8:06.98
2018	Balkan Indoor Championships	Istanbul, Turkey	1st	3000 m	8:08.34
2018	Mediterranean Games	Tarragona, Spain	–	1500 m	DNF
2018	Mediterranean Games	Tarragona, Spain	13th	5000 m	14:32.05
2018	World U20 Championships	Tampere, Finland	6th	1500 m	3:44.65
2018	World U20 Championships	Tampere, Finland	8th	5000 m	14:15.37
2018	Balkan Championships	Stara Zagora, Bulgaria	1st	1500 m	3:43.36
2018	Balkan Championships	Stara Zagora, Bulgaria	1st	3000 m	8:15.06
2018	European Cross Country Championships	Tilburg, Netherlands	3rd	U20 race	18:11
2019	Balkan Indoor Championships	Istanbul, Turkey	1st	1500 m	3:43.13
2019	European Indoor Championships	Glasgow, United Kingdom	13th (h)	1500 m	3:47.94
2019	European U23 Championships	Gävle, Sweden	3rd	1500 m	3:50.90
2019	European U23 Championships	Gävle, Sweden	8th	5000 m	14:26.40
2020	Balkan Indoor Championships	Istanbul, Turkey	1st	1500 m	3:50.18
2021	Balkan Championships	Smederevo, Serbia	1st	1500 m	3:52.23
2021	European U23 Championships	Tallinn, Estonia	4th	1500 m	3:40.91
2022	World Indoor Championships	Belgrade, Serbia	13th (h)	3000 m	7:52.78
2022	Mediterranean Games	Oran, Algeria	10th	1500 m	3:45.42
2022	European Championships	Munich, Germany	18th	5000 m	13:39.60
2023	European Indoor Championships	Istanbul, Turkey	3rd	3000 m	7:44.03
2023	World Championships	Budapest, Hungary	31st (h)	1500 m	3:37.45
2024	World Indoor Championships	Glasgow, United Kingdom	8th (h)	1500 m	3:39.98
2024	European Championships	Rome, Italy	6th	5000 m	13:24.54
2024	Olympic Games	Paris, France	32nd (h)	5000 m	14:14.46
2025	European Indoor Championships	Apeldoorn, Netherlands	23rd (h)	3000 m	8:01.67

== Personal bests ==
- 800 metres – 1:50.31 (Ćuprija 2021)
- 1500 metres – 3:35.07 (Zagreb 2020)
  - 1500 metres indoor – 3:37.84 (Belgrade 2022) NR
  - One mile indoor – 3:55.90 (Ostrava 2023) NR
- 3000 metres – 7:39.45 (Rovereto 2021) NR
  - 3000 metres indoor – 7:39.96 (Toruń 2022) NR
- 5000 metres – 13:13.06 (Oordegem 2025) NR
