= 2017 European Athletics U23 Championships – Men's 1500 metres =

The men's 1500 metres event at the 2017 European Athletics U23 Championships was held in Bydgoszcz, Poland, at Zdzisław Krzyszkowiak Stadium on 13 and 15 July.

== Medalists ==
Gold	Marius Probst; Germany
Silver	Filip Sasínek; Czech Republic
Bronze	Michał Rozmys; Poland

== Results ==
=== Heats ===
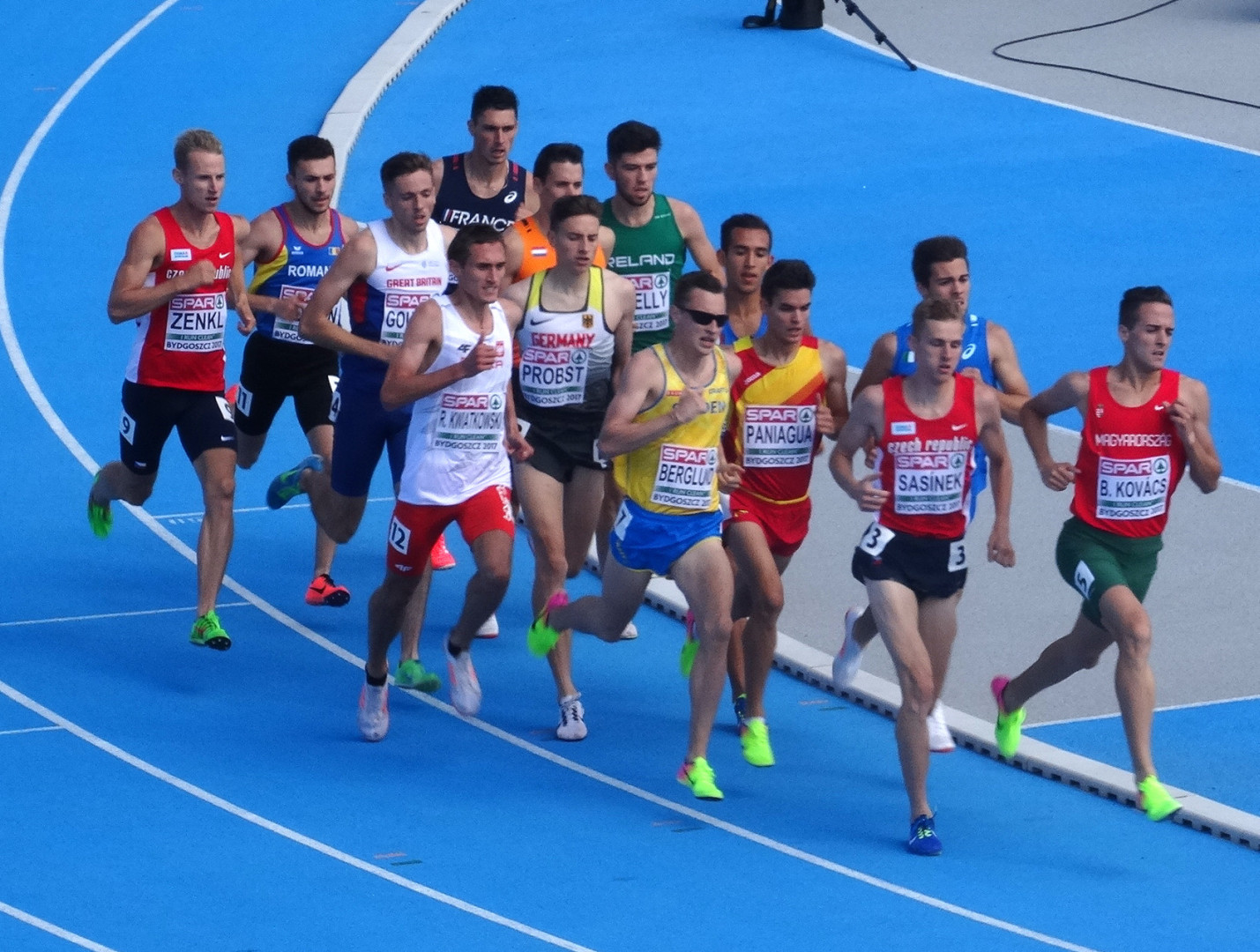
Heat 1

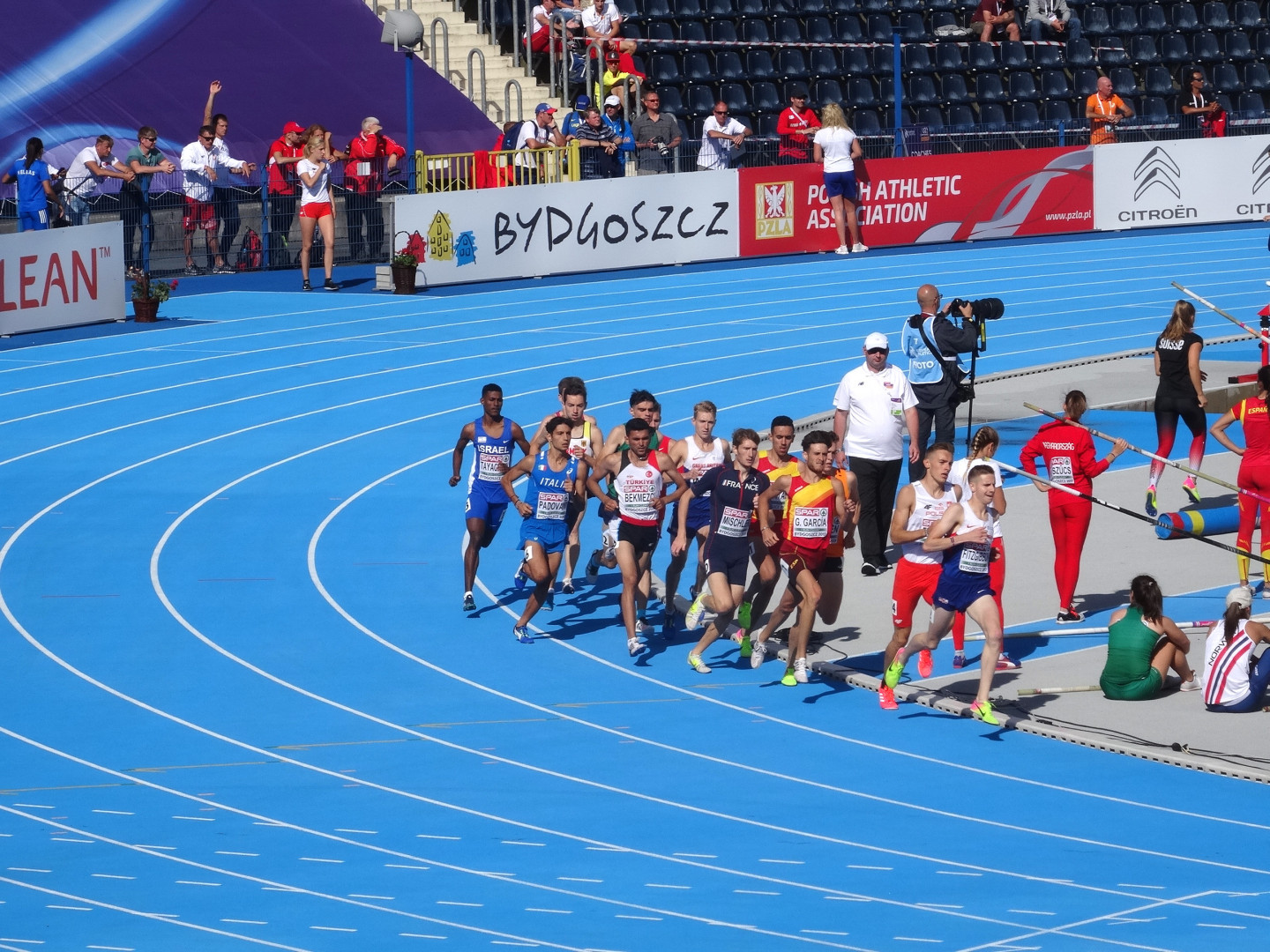
Heat 2

14 July

Qualification rule: First 4 (Q) and the next 4 fastest (q) qualified for the final.

Rank	Heat	Name	Nationality	Time	Notes
1	2	Michał Rozmys	Poland	3:43.22	Q
2	2	Gonzalo García	Spain	3:43.35	Q
3	2	Ayoub Mokhtar	Spain	3:43.41	Q
4	2	Robbie Fitzgibbon	Great Britain	3:43.47	Q
5	2	Baptiste Mischler	France	3:43.49	q
6	1	Marius Probst	Germany	3:43.88	Q
7	2	Mike Foppen	Netherlands	3:43.96	q
8	1	Filip Sasínek	Czech Republic	3:43.96	Q
9	1	Neil Gourley	Great Britain	3:43.99	Q
10	2	Süleyman Bekmezci	Turkey	3:44.19	q, SB
11	1	Alexis Miellet	France	3:44.36	Q
12	1	Sergio Paniagua	Spain	3:44.38	q
13	1	Kalle Berglund	Sweden	3:44.56	
14	2	James West	Great Britain	3:44.72	
15	1	Vincent Hazeleger	Netherlands	3:44.73	
16	1	Benjamin Kovács	Hungary	3:44.87	
17	1	Yassin Bouih	Italy	3:45.18	
18	2	Mattia Padovani	Italy	3:45.74	
19	1	Enrico Ricobbon	Italy	3:45.89	
20	2	Maximilian Thorwirth	Germany	3:46.87	
21	1	Roman Kwiatkowski	Poland	3:47.13	
22	2	Jan Friš	Czech Republic	3:47.73	
23	1	Nicolae Marian Coman	Romania	3:48.95	
24	1	Adam Zenkl	Czech Republic	3:50.45	
25	2	Laviniu Madalin Chis	Romania	3:51.83	
26	2	Andrew Coscoran	Ireland	3:52.47	
27	1	Kevin Kelly	Ireland	3:56.12	
28	2	Necho Tayachew	Israel	4:04.47	

=== Final ===
15 July

Rank	Name	Nationality	Time	Notes
1st place, gold medalist(s)	Marius Probst	Germany	3:49.06	
2nd place, silver medalist(s)	Filip Sasínek	Czech Republic	3:49.23	
3rd place, bronze medalist(s)	Michał Rozmys	Poland	3:49.30	
4	Neil Gourley	Great Britain	3:49.53	
5	Baptiste Mischler	France	3:49.76	
6	Ayoub Mokhtar	Spain	3:49.78	
7	Gonzalo García	Spain	3:49.94	
8	Robbie Fitzgibbon	Great Britain	3:50.07	
9	Alexis Miellet	France	3:51.05	
10	Mike Foppen	Netherlands	3:51.25	
11	Sergio Paniagua	Spain	3:51.31	
12	Süleyman Bekmezci	Turkey	3:54.63	
