= George Manangoi =

Kenyan middle-distance runner

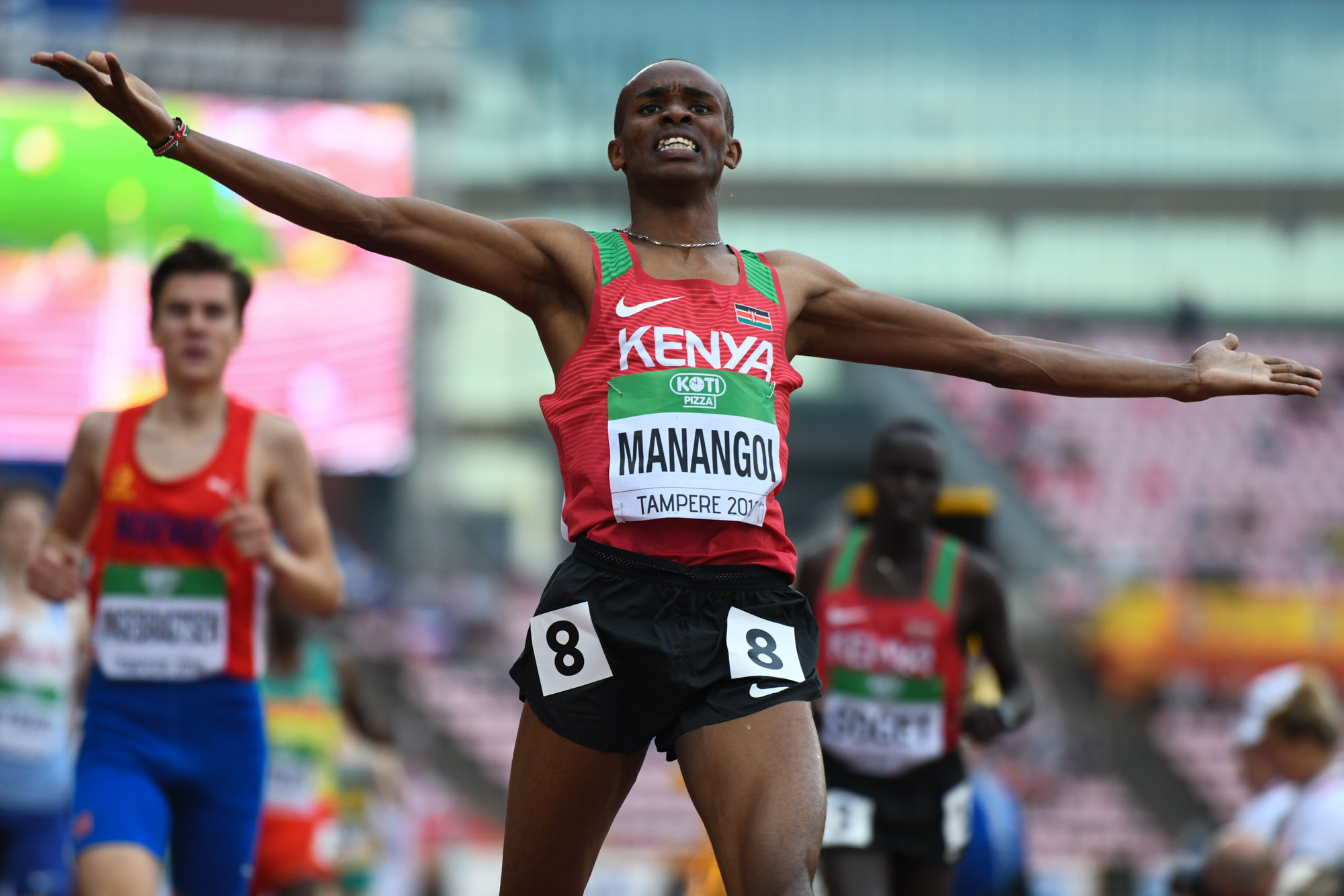

Personal information
- Nationality: Kenyan
- Born: 29 November 2000 (age 25)

Sport
- Sport: Track

Achievements and titles
- Personal bests: 800 m: 1:47.20; 1000 m: 2:18.07; 1500 m: 3:31.49
Medal record
Men's athletics
Representing Kenya
World U20 Championships
Gold medal – first place	2018 Tampere	1500 m
World U18 Championships
Gold medal – first place	2017 Nairobi	1500 m
African Games
Gold medal – first place	2019 Rabat	1500 m
- Updated on March 3, 2019

George Meitamei Manangoi (born 29 November 2000) is a Kenyan middle-distance runner.

In the 1,500 metres event, his personal best is a 3:31.49 (Stade Louis II, Monaco, 12 July 2019). He won this event at the 2018 U20 World Championships in Tampere, defeating Jakob Ingebrigtsen. He is the young brother of Elijah Manangoi, who is also a middle-distance runner.

On 20 July 2018, he attempted and failed to break the junior world record in the 1,000 metres during the Herculis track meet in Monaco, and was defeated by Solomon Lekuta.

He also won the 1500 metres event at the 2019 African Games in Rabat.

== Personal bests ==
Outdoor

Event	Time	Date	Place
800 m	1:47.30	8 March 2018	Pretoria
1000 m	2:18.07	20 July 2019	Monaco
1500 m	3:31.49	12 July 2019	Monaco

- From World Athletics Profile
