= Robbie Fitzgibbon =

English middle-distance runner (1996–2024)

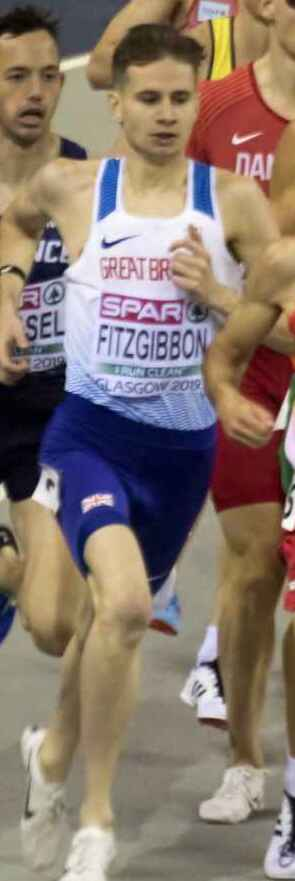
- Fitzgibbon in 2019

Personal information
- National team: Great Britain and Northern Ireland
- Born: 23 March 1996 Brighton, England
- Died: 7 October 2024 (aged 28)
- Years active: 2008–2024

Sport
- Event: 1500m
- Club: Brighton Phoenix
- Coached by: Joel Kidger, Paul Collicutt, Jon Bigg

Achievements and titles
- Personal best: 3:36 – 1500m

Robbie Fitzgibbon (23 March 1996 – 7 October 2024) was an English middle-distance runner specialising in the 1500 metres. As a junior he was an English Schools champion and would go on to represent his country at both junior and senior competition.

== Biography ==
Fitzgibbon's first race was in 2008 at age 12. As a junior competitor, he joined the Brighton Phoenix running club. In 2014, aged 18 he won the English Schools title in the 1500m representing Sussex.

In 2015, he placed fifth in the 1500m final at the European Athletics Junior Championships in Sweden.

In 2017, he set a personal best over the metric mile of 3:36.97 at the Nijmegen Global Athletics competition. That year, he placed 13th in the 1500m at the London Anniversary Games and set the male record for the Hove Promenade Parkrun at 14:31. At the 2017 European Athletics U23 Championships in Poland, Fitzgibbon placed eighth in the 1500 metres.

In 2018, he set a season's best in the 1500m at the Internationales Soundtrack-Meeting in Tübingen, Germany with a time of 3.39.37.

In 2019, Fitzgibbon represented Great Britain and Northern Ireland at the Glasgow European Indoor Athletics competition, making the final and placing 8th overall. It would be his last international level competition.

After Glasgow, he experienced a severe injury to his ankle that would prevent him from elite competition and would impact his mental health. After recovery, began distance and cross county running.

In 2022, Fitzgibbon was diagnosed with psychosis. He actively spoke out about his mental health, describing coping with his diagnosis as "difficult".

In June 2024, Fitzgibbon won the Bexhill 5 km with a time of 15:13. That year, he began training for the 2025 Brighton Marathon, which he planned to run in support of the charity Mind.

Fitzgibbon died on 7 October 2024, at the age of 28.
