= Zhang Dayu =

Chinese chemist (1906–1989)

- 张大煜
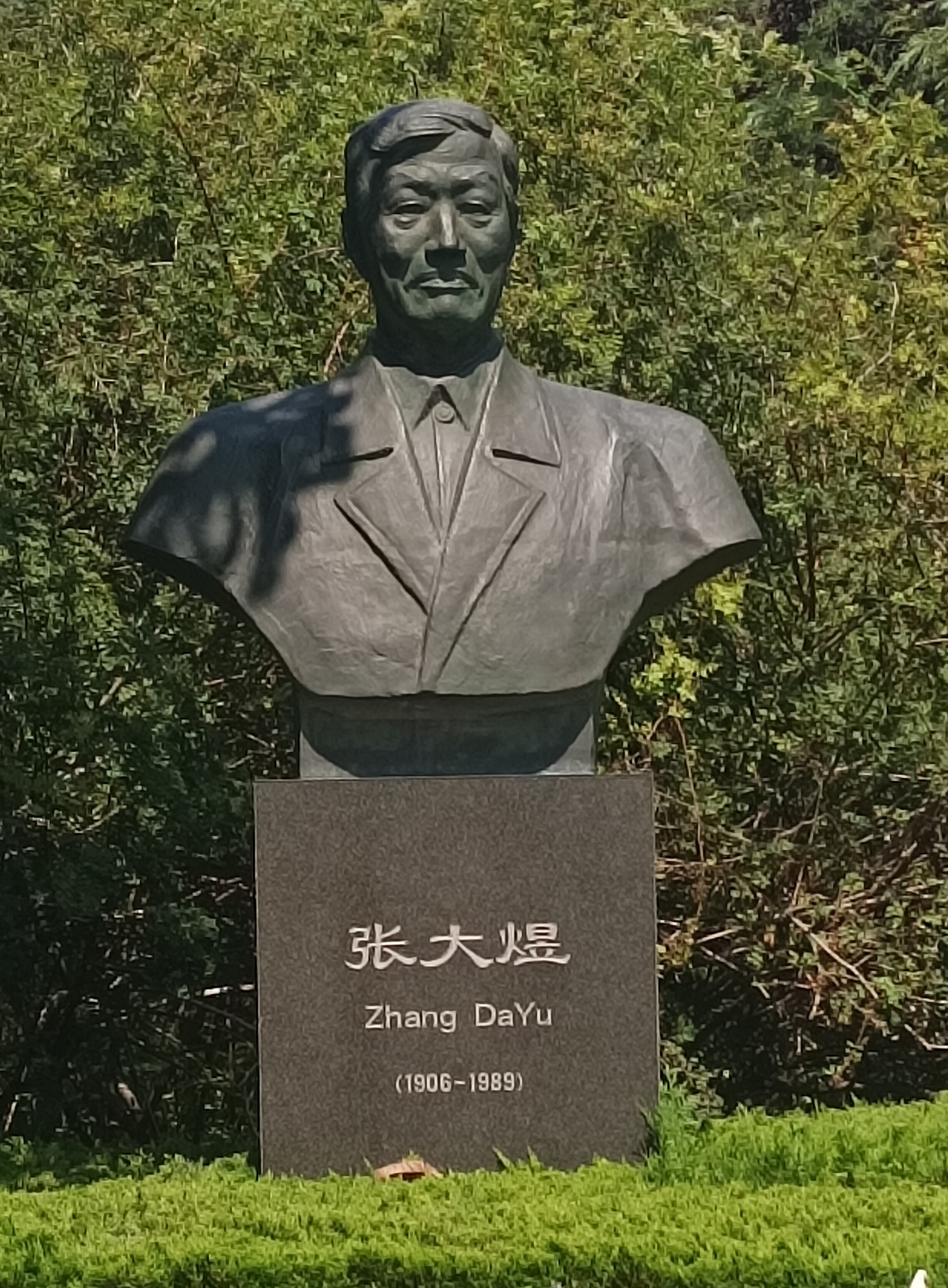
- Died: Beijing, People's Republic of China
- Scientific career
- Thesis: Physikalisch-chemische Untersuchungen an Eisenoxydsolen : Über die Ladung von Eisenoxydsolen beim Verdünnen und bei unregelmässigen Reihen (1933)
- Doctoral advisor: Alfred Lottermoser
- Notable students: Wang Dexi

Zhang Dayu (Chinese: 张大煜; January or February 15, 1906 – February 20, 1989) was a Chinese chemist who specialised in physical chemistry. He was a founding member of the Chinese Academy of Sciences.

== Biography ==
Born in Jiangyin into a prominent local family, Zhang Dayu was educated at Beiyang University and Tsinghua University, graduating from Tsinghua in 1929. He received a doctorate from TU Dresden in Germany in 1933, before returning to China.

From 1933 and 1937, he taught at Tsinghua University. During the Second Sino-Japanese War, Zhang taught at the National Southwestern Associated University and was a researcher with the Academia Sinica. He also participated in the establishment of a synthetic fuel plant in Yunnan, which produced oil from lignite.

After the end of the Second World War, he returned to Tsinghua as a professor, as well as teaching at Jiao Tong University. After the foundation of the People's Republic of China in 1949, Zhang became dean of the Department of Chemical Engineering at the Dalian University of Technology, and headed several institutes under the Chinese Academy of Sciences, of which he was a founding academician. During the Cultural Revolution, he was denounced as a counter-revolutionary.

He was a member of the first, second, and third National People's Congress and a member of the fifth National Committee of the Chinese People's Political Consultative Conference. He was a member of the Central Committee of the China Democratic League.

He was the brother-in-law of the actress Shangguan Yunzhu.

== Legacy and commemoration ==
A biography of Zhang Dayu was published in 2006.

The Zhang Dayu Lectureship at the Dalian Institute of Chemical Physics are named in his honour.

The Zhang Dayu School of Chemistry at the Dalian University of Technology is named in his honour.

The Chinese Chemical Society's China Catalysis Achievement Award is named the "Zhang Dayu Award".
