= Marius Probst =

German middle-distance runner

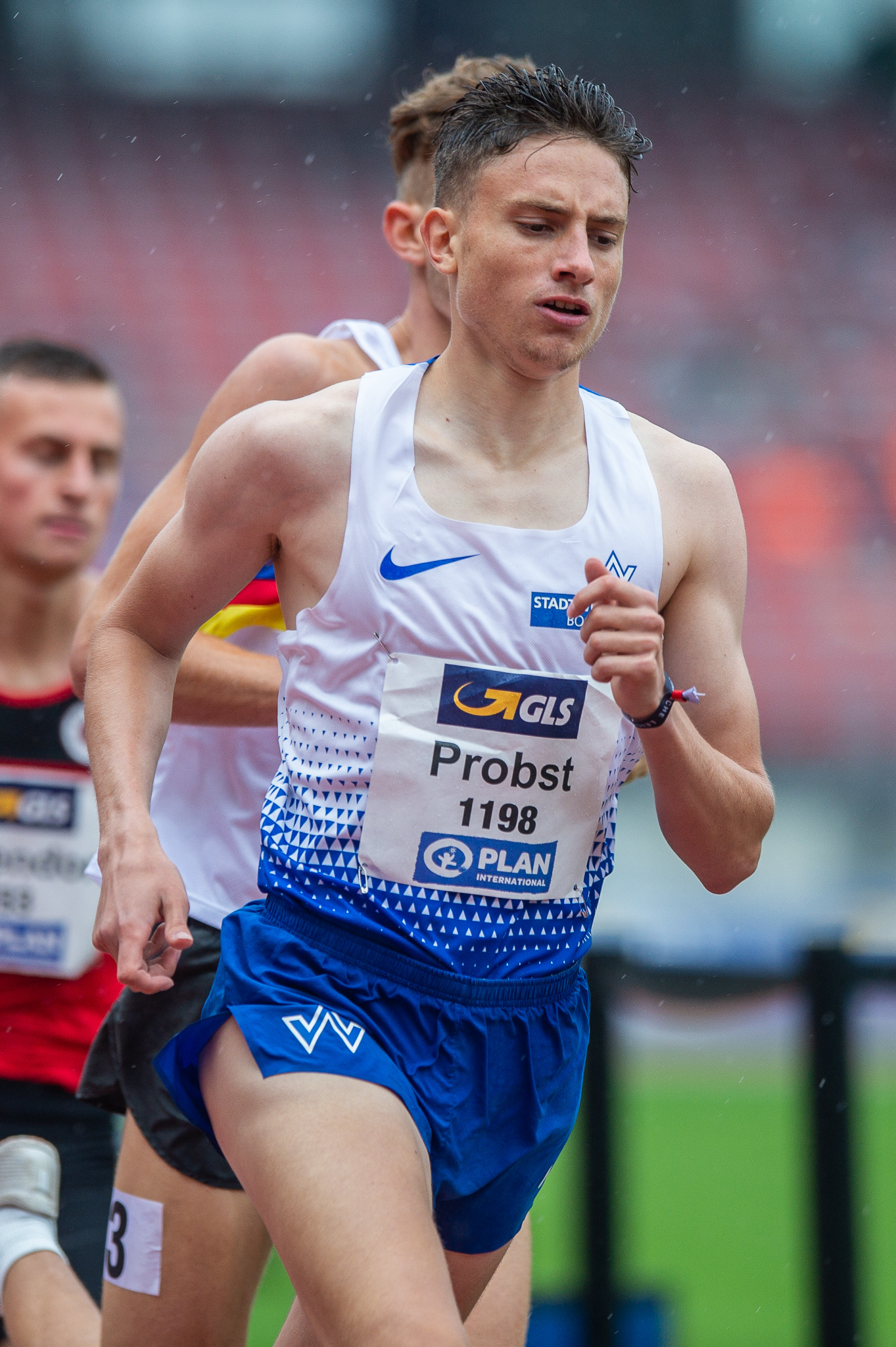
- Marius Probst in 2018

Personal information
- Born: 20 August 1995 (age 30) Herne, Germany
- Height: 1.83 m (6 ft 0 in)
- Weight: 64 kg (141 lb)

Sport
- Sport: Athletics
- Event: 1500 metres
- Club: TV Wattenscheid 01
- Coached by: Markus Kubillus

Marius Probst (born 20 August 1995) is a German middle-distance runner specialising in the 1500 metres. He won a gold medal at the 2017 European U23 Championships. Additionally, he finished sixth at the 2019 European Indoor Championships.

== International competitions ==
Year	Competition	Venue	Position	Event	Notes
Representing Germany
2015	European U23 Championships	Tallinn, Estonia	11th	1500 m	3:47.50
2017	European Indoor Championships	Belgrade, Serbia	12th (h)	1500 m	3:47.89
2017	European U23 Championships	Bydgoszcz, Poland	1st	1500 m	3:49.06
2018	European Championships	Berlin, Germany	14th (h)	1500 m	3:42.37
2019	European Indoor Championships	Glasgow, United Kingdom	6th	1500 m	3:45.76
2021	European Indoor Championships	Toruń, Poland	36th (h)	1500 m	3:44.63
2024	European Championships	Rome, Italy	21st (h)	1500 m	3:44.70
2024	Olympic Games	Paris, France	18th (rep)	1500 m	3:36.54
2025	European Indoor Championships	Apeldoorn, Netherlands	11th (h)	1500 m	3:41.32

== Personal bests ==
Outdoor

- 800 metres – 1:47.56 (Kortrijk 2018)
- 1000 metres – 2:22.77 (Dortmund 2015)
- 1500 metres – 3:37.07 (Oordegem 2018)

Indoor

- 800 metres – 1:47.33 (Erfurt 2018)
- 1500 metres – 3:39.89 (Karlsruhe 2019)
