= Kumari Taki =

Kenyan middle-distance runner

Personal information
- Nationality: Kenyan
- Born: 6 May 1999 (age 27)

Sport
- Sport: Athletics
- Event: 1500 metres

Achievements and titles
- Personal bests: 800 m: 1:46.29 (Hengelo 2018); 1500 m: 3:34.14 (Ostrava 2020); Mile: 3:59.20 (Oslo 2018)
Medal record
Representing Kenya
Men's athletics
Junior World Championships
Gold medal – first place	2016 Bydgoszcz	1500 metres

Kumari Taki (born 6 May 1999) is a Kenyan middle-distance runner, who specialises in the 1500 meters. At junior level, he won gold medals in 1500 metres at the 2015 World Youth Championships, and at the 2016 World U20 Championships. He represented Kenya at the 2019 World Athletics Championships, competing in men's 1500 metres.
