= Edward Zakayo =

Kenyan long-distance runner

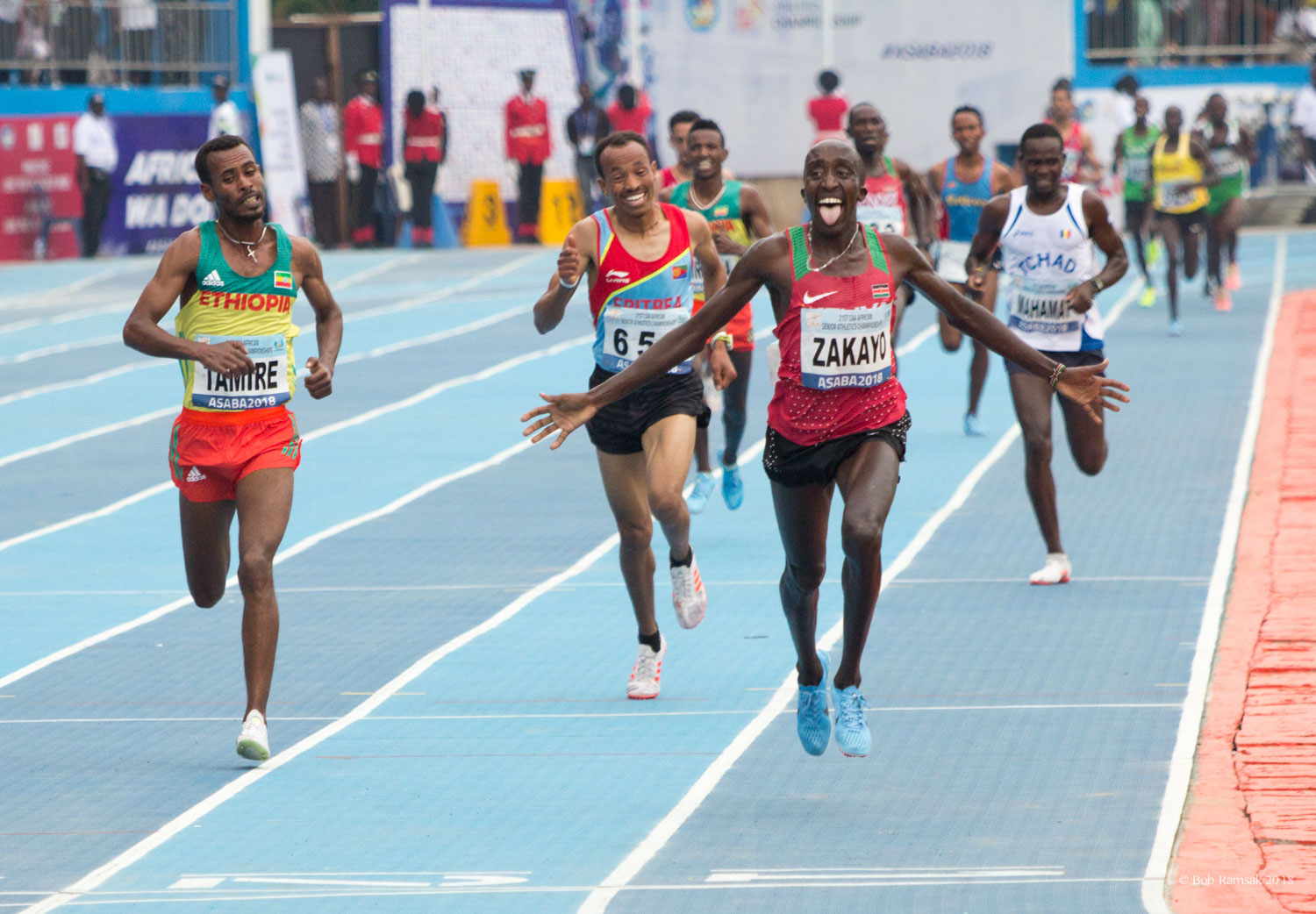
- Edward Zakayo competing in the 2018 African Athletics Championship in Asaba, Nigeria

Personal information
- Born: Edward Pingua Zakayo; 25 November 2001 (age 24) Narok, Kenya

Sport
- Sport: Athletics
- Event: 5000 metres
- Coached by: Erick Kimaiyo

Achievements and titles
- Personal best: 5000 m: 13:03.19
Medal record
Men's athletics
Representing Kenya
Commonwealth Games
Bronze medal – third place	2018 Gold Coast	5000 m
African Championships
Gold medal – first place	2018 Asaba	5000 m
World U20 Championships
Gold medal – first place	2018 Tampere	5000 m
World U18 Championships
Silver medal – second place	2017 Nairobi	3000 m

Edward Pingua Zakayo (born 25 November 2001) was a Kenyan male long-distance runner who competed in the 5000 metres. He was the bronze medallist in that event at the 2018 Commonwealth Games. After being suspended due to multiple failures to be present for drug tests, he announced his retirement in 2025.

Born in Narok, Zakayo said his aim in his running career was to help his mother out of poverty and pay for his education. In 2017, he won the Kenyan youth trials and was selected for the 2017 IAAF World U18 Championships, where he took a silver medal over 3000 metres in front of a home crowd in Nairobi. On 11 June 2018, he won the Kenya World U20 trials with a new personal best of 13:19 to qualify for the U20 World Championships in Finland.

His win at the U20 World Champs while looking much older than his claimed age, attracted controversy as to if he'd lied about his age, and if he was really a Senior athlete, not a Junior. A problem Kenyan athletics has often faced. Additionally, his Senior career never ever lived up to his promise of his Junior performances

== International competitions ==
Year	Competition	Venue	Position	Event	Notes
2017	World U18 Championships	Nairobi, Kenya	2nd	3000 m	7:49.17
2018	Commonwealth Games	Gold Coast, Australia	3rd	5000 m	13:54.06
2018	World U20 Championships	Tampere, Finland	1st	5000 m	13:20.16
2018	African Championships	Asaba, Nigeria	1st	5000 m	13:48.58
2019	African U20 Championships	Abidjan, Ivory Coast	1st	5000 m	13:13.06
2019	African Games	Rabat, Morocco	2nd	5000 m	13:30.96

== Personal bests ==
Outdoor

Event	Time	Date	Place
3000 m	7:49.17	16 July 2017	Nairobi
5000 m	13:03.19	6 June 2019	Rome
10000m	27:35.07	25 June 2022	Nairobi

- From World Athletics Profile
