= Ingebrigtsen =

Ingebrigtsen is a surname of Norwegian origin. Notable people with the surname include:

== Sports ==
- Ingebrigtsen family, Norwegian athletics family, including:
  - Filip Ingebrigtsen (born 1993), middle-distance runner
  - Gjert Ingebrigtsen (born 1966), sports coach
  - Henrik Ingebrigtsen (born 1991), middle-distance runner
  - Jakob Ingebrigtsen (born 2000), middle- and long-distance runner
- Kåre Ingebrigtsen (born 1965), Norwegian former footballer
- Mikael Ingebrigtsen (born 1996), Norwegian footballer
- Tommy Ingebrigtsen (born 1977), Norwegian former ski jumper
- Storm Ingebrigtsen (born 2005), Norwegian cyclist

== Politics ==
- Aldor Ingebrigtsen (1888–1952), Norwegian politician for the Labour Party
- Anton Olai Normann Ingebrigtsen Djupvik or Anton Djupvik (1881–1951), Norwegian politician for the Liberal Party
- Bill Ingebrigtsen (born 1952), Minnesota politician and a member of the Minnesota Senate
- Guri Ingebrigtsen (1952–2020), Norwegian politician for the Labour Party
- Odd Emil Ingebrigtsen (born 1964), Norwegian politician for the Conservative Party
- Ole Ingebrigtsen Soelberg (1798–1874), Norwegian politician
- Ole Nikolai Ingebrigtsen Strømme (1876–1936), Norwegian Minister of Social Affairs in 1933
- Oscar Andreas Ingebrigtsen (1902–1979), Norwegian politician for the Labour Party
- Roger Ingebrigtsen (born 1966), Norwegian politician for the Labour Party

== Music ==
- Christian Ingebrigtsen (born 1977), Norwegian singer-songwriter and musician, also part of the band A1
- Dag Ingebrigtsen (born 1958), Norwegian musician who had his debut in 1977 with the group Subway Suck
- Stein Ingebrigtsen (born 1945), Norwegian singer
