= Tore Sandberg =

Norwegian journalist, non-fiction writer and private investigator

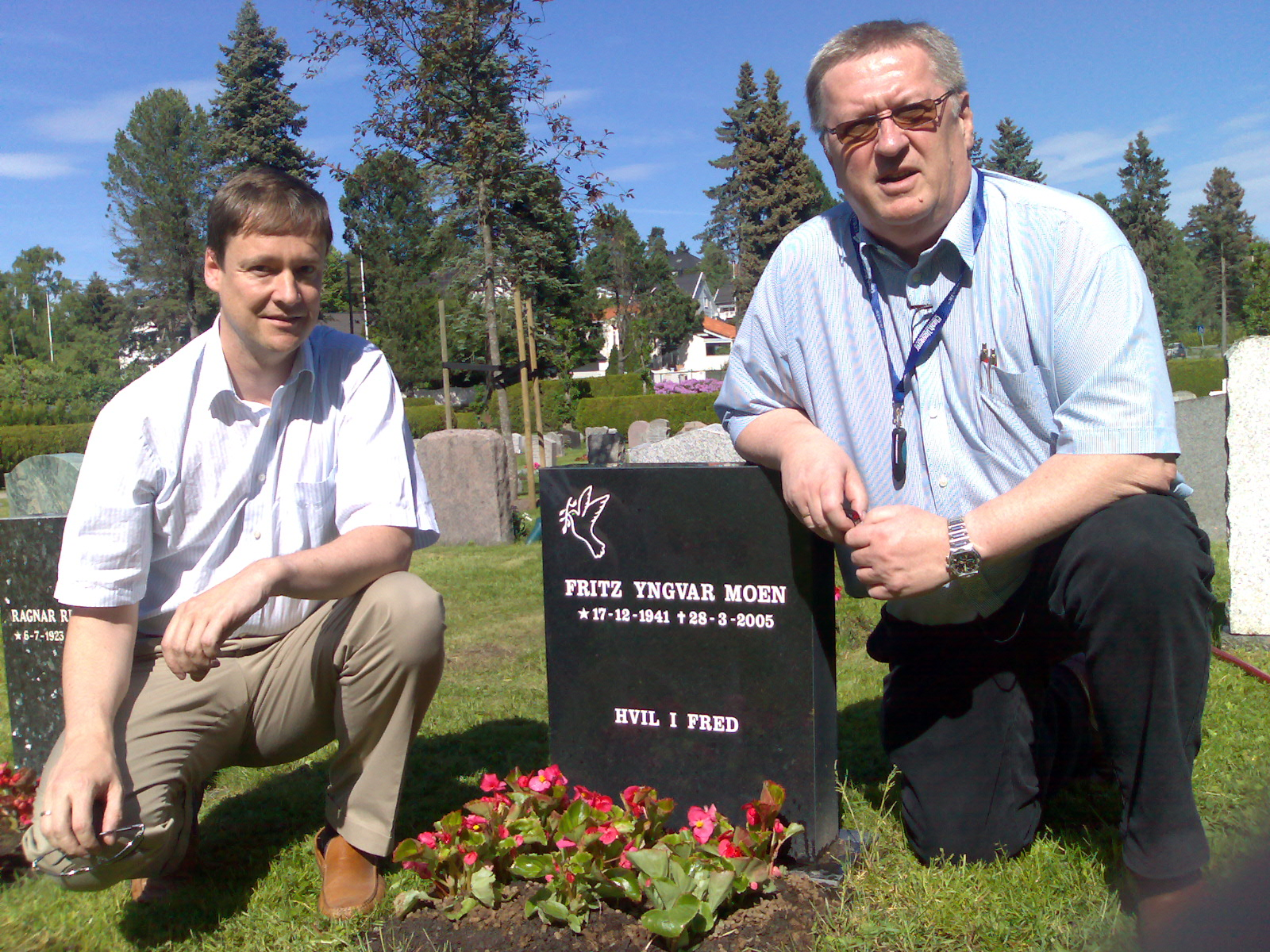
- John Christian Elden and Tore Sandberg at Fritz Moen's tombstone
- Born: 23 April 1944 (age 81); Asker, Norway
- Occupations: Journalist; Non-fiction writer Private investigator

Tore Sandberg (born 23 April 1944) is a Norwegian journalist, non-fiction writer and private investigator.

He was born in Asker. From 1968 to 1982 he worked as news presenter for the Norwegian Broadcasting Corporation, for Dagsnytt and Dagsrevyen . He is known for his engagement in cases of miscarriage of justice, including the Liland affair and the Fritz Moen case. His awards include Zola-prisen (2005), Amnestyprisen (2006), Olav Selvaag-prisen, and Rettssikkerhetsprisen (2011).

== Selected books ==
- Øksedrapene i Lille Helvete (1992)
- Narrespill (2002)
- Overgrepet : justismordene på Fritz Moen (2007)
