= Arnved Nedkvitne =

Norwegian historian

Professor Dr Arnved Nedkvitne
- Born: May 21, 1947 (age 79); Haugesund
- Education: University of Bergen
- Awards: Member of the Royal Norwegian Society of Sciences and Letters (1993)
- Scientific career
- Fields: mediaeval Norwegian history
- Workplaces: University of Trondheim; University of Oslo

Arnved Nedkvitne (born 21 May 1947) is a Norwegian historian of the Middle Ages and Professor Emeritus of mediaeval history. He held the chair of Norwegian mediaeval history at the University of Trondheim from 1991 to 1993 and at the University of Oslo from 1993 to 2009. He is a member of the Royal Norwegian Society of Sciences and Letters, and was elected in 1993. Nedkvitne is regarded as "one of Norway's preeminent commercial historians" and as Norway's foremost mediaeval historian. His research has focused on Norwegian urban history, foreign trade, the economy of coastal communities and pre-modern social organisation. He is the foremost scholar of the relations between the Hanseatic League and Norway; his research has also explored topics such as honour, law and religious ethics in Scandinavia, the social consequences of literacy in the Middle Ages, lay beliefs of mediaeval Scandinavia, and the Norse settlement of Arctic Greenland.

== Career ==
Born in Haugesund, Nedkvitne obtained his cand.philol. degree in history at the University of Bergen in 1975 with a dissertation on Handelssjøfarten mellom England og Norge i høymiddelalderen (Sea-based trade between England and Norway in the High Middle Ages). He earned his dr. philos. degree in 1983 on the thesis Utenrikshandelen fra det vestafjelske Norge (The Foreign Trade of Western Norway). He was employed as a research fellow and senior researcher at the University of Bergen until 1991. He was professor of mediaeval history at the University of Trondheim from 1991 to 1993, and was appointed as professor of mediaeval history at the University of Oslo in 1993.

== Scholarly work ==
Nedkvitne's research focuses on Norwegian urban history, foreign trade, the economy of coastal communities and pre-modern social organisation. He has written several books, especially on Scandinavia's foreign trade relations in the Middle Ages, on literacy and beliefs in mediaeval Scandinavia and on the Norse settlement of Greenland. A major research focus of Nedkvitne is also relations between the Hanseatic League and Norway.

According to historian Kåre Lunden, Nedkvitne has "authored several major works of Norwegian economic history. In recent years, he has been an important innovator, linked to the 'cultural turn' in the discipline". Ian Peter Grohse notes that "Nedkvitne's extensive work on the history of Norwegian fishing, shipping, and foreign trade has duly affirmed his place as one of Norway's preeminent commercial historians and a leading scholar in the field of Norwegian–Hanseatic relations."

The book Norse Greenland: Viking Peasants in the Arctic (Routledge, 2018) discusses how a community of 2000–3000 Viking peasants survived in Arctic Greenland for 430 years (ca. 985–1415), and why they finally disappeared.

== Honours ==
He was elected as a member of the Royal Norwegian Society of Sciences and Letters in 1993.

== Controversy over academic freedom and dismissal in 2009 ==
In February, 2009, Nedkvitne was dismissed from his position as professor by the university board of the University of Oslo after he had refused to attend a meeting with the dean of the faculty of humanities Trine Syvertsen. This happened in the context of a years-long conflict at his institute involving several professors. A point of contention was the management style of then-institute director Jorunn Bjørgum, who was accused of being "highly authoritarian" by one of Nedkvitne's professor colleagues, and both sides accused each other of harassment.

The case caused concern among other Norwegian professors and academics (including Jan Helge Solbakk, Henning Jakhelln, Bernt Hagtvet, Kristian Gundersen, Unni Wikan, Arne Johan Vetlesen, Anine Kierulf and Jan Fridthjof Bernt) that academic freedom was not respected by the university administration. On March 11, 2009, it became known that Nedkvitne would bring the case to court with support from the Norwegian Association of Researchers.

The case commenced before Oslo City Court in January 2010. Professor Finn Fuglestad testified that Jorunn Bjørgum was a "highly authoritarian" institute director, while Professor Kristine Bruland testified that the institute leadership "systematically harassed employees." Bruland's testimony was also supported by Professor John Peter Collett. The city court found that the university was entitled to fire Nedkvitne. Nedkvitne first decided not to appeal to the High Court (Borgarting lagmannsrett) for economic reasons. The court's decision was criticized by several professors. In February 2010, the Board of the Norwegian Association of Researchers decided to support an appeal financially, due to the "principal character" of his case. In March 2011 the High Court's decision upheld the City Court's decision, stating that the University of Oslo was entitled to fire Nedkvitne because he allegedly refused to attend a meeting with Syvertsen.

The University of Oslo offered to give Nedkvitne 2 years pay if he would turn in his resignation.

== Selected publications ==
- Utenrikshandelen fra det vestafjelske Norge 1100-1600, 1983 (dissertation, dr. philos.)
- "Mens bønderne seilte og jægterne for" : nordnorsk og vestnorsk kystøkonomi 1500-1730, Oslo: Universitetsforlaget, 1988
- Människan och miljön, 1991 (with Kjell Haarstad and Lars J. Lundgren)
- Byen under Eikaberg : fra byens oppkomst til 1536, 1991 (volume one of Oslo bys historie, with Per G. Norseng)
  - Re-released in 2000 as Middelalderbyen ved Bjørvika, Oslo: Cappelen, 475 pp., ISBN 82-02-19100-9
- Norwegen und die Hanse : wirtschaftliche und kulturelle Aspekte im europäischen Vergleich, Frankfurt am Main: Peter Lang, 1994 (editor, with Volker Henn)
- Møte med døden i norrøn middelalder, Oslo: Cappelen, 1997, 151 pp., ISBN 82-456-0202-7, published in Swedish 2004
- The social consequences of literacy in medieval Scandinavia, Turnhout: Brepols, 2004, 290 pp., ISBN 2-503-51450-2
- Lay belief in Norse society 1000-1350, Copenhagen: Museum Tusculanum Press, 2009, 401 pp., ISBN 978-87-635-0786-8
- Ære, lov og religion i Norge gjennom tusen år, Oslo: Spartacus Forlag, 2011, 444 pp., ISBN 978-82-304-0070-8
- The German Hansa and Bergen 1100-1600 , Köln: Böhlau, 2014, 785 pp., ISBN 978-3-412-22202-4
- Norse Greenland: Viking Peasants in the Arctic, Routledge, 2018, ISBN 978-0815366294
