= Fredrik Fasting Torgersen =

Norwegian man convicted of murder (1934–2015)

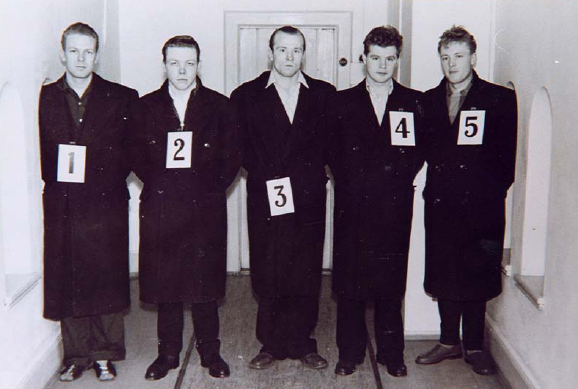
Fredrik Fasting Torgersen in the centre of a police lineup

Fredrik Ludvig Fasting Torgersen (1 October 1934 – 18 June 2015) was a Norwegian man who was convicted of murder in 1958 in a much-debated case, and released from prison in 1974.

Serving 16 years in prison before being released, he continuously claimed his innocence.

In 2013 Bjørg Njaa, a daughter of a judge in the 1958 trial, said that her father was prejudiced against Torgersen even before being assigned to the trial.

In 2014 he was denied access to official recordings of then leader of the Norwegian Board of Forensic Medicine, Bjørnar Olaisen, answering to Criminal Cases Review Commission.

Torgersen died on 18 June 2015, a week after his sixth call for a resumption of his case. At the time of his death, he was hospitalized with cancer.

== The 1958 trial ==
In December 1957, 16-year-old girl Rigmor Johnsen was raped and murdered in Oslo. Fredrik Fasting Torgersen, then 23, a small-time criminal with several prior convictions for theft and violence, was arrested and charged with the crime. On 16 June 1958, despite very little evidence connecting him to the crime scene, Torgersen was convicted and sentenced to life imprisonment. This marked the beginning of one of the most controversial cases in Norwegian criminal history. Torgersen went on to serve 16 years before being released from prison in 1974.

A 2013 article in the Norwegian newspaper Aftenposten asserted that "the expert witness in 1958 said that the bite mark [that the killer left on one of the breasts of the victim] with full certainty pointed to Torgersen as the murderer. - The other evidence in the case dealt with conifer needle leaves (barnåler), excrement and police lineup (vitneutpeking)".

== Calls for resumption of proceedings ==
His calls for resumption of proceedings were denied by the Supreme Court of Norway in 1976 and 2001, and again by the independent Criminal Cases Review Commission (led by Janne Kristiansen) in 2006.

In the spring of 2008, in a letter to Minister of Justice Knut Storberget, 279 experts within medicine, odontology, physics, chemistry and other sciences, questioned the evaluation of evidence in courts and requested a review of the use of science in courts to avoid miscarriage of justice.

Several public figures in addition to Bjørneboe have claimed that Torgersen is innocent, notably the former chairwoman of the Norwegian Authors' Union Ebba Haslund, professor of jurisprudence Ståle Eskeland and professor of medicine Per Brandtzæg.

=== The 2010 Criminal Cases Review ===
On the basis of claims of grave errors in fact and judgment by the Criminal Cases Review Commission, the conviction of Torgersen will be reviewed again in 2009–10.. In 2010, the commission decided to reject the petition. In 2013, Torgersen's lawyer (Jan Tennøe) said that "The commission's rejection in 2010 is not an improvement since this commission consisting of five different members, has referred and used the reasoning from [the review of] 2006 as the foundation for its decision."

The conclusions of the Criminal Cases Review Commission (including the one of 2010) says that "the technical evidence still speaks heavily for the guilt of Fredrik Fasting Torgersen. This led to a letter-of-worry to the minister of justice—from 270 researchers within [the fields of] natural sciences and medicine", according to prof. Kristian Gundersen.

=== The 2014 decision allowing a retrial relating to the appellate court verdict of 1958 ===
In 2014 "Verdens Gang reported that Borgarting appellate court unanimously voided a verdict of the Oslo District Court, after Torgersen sued the government and the Criminal Cases Review Commission. The decision by the appellate court says that Torgersen and his lawyer can retry the 16 June 1958 verdict of the appellate court; the [Criminal Cases Review] Commission's declining—in 2006 and 2010—has been declared invalid (by the appellate court)", according to Dagsavisen.

== Legacy ==
On 1 October 2014, on his 80th birthday, the festschrift, Festskrift til Fredrik Fasting Torgersen was scheduled to be released, with articles by Karsten Alnæs, Rune Ottosen, Jan Erik Vold, Per Brandtzæg, Gunnar Nerdrum, Camilla Juell Eide, Nils Erik Lie, Ståle Eskeland, Peter Normann Waage, Jan Tennøe, Thorvald Steen, and older articles by Jens Bjørneboe and André Bjerke.

== In popular culture ==
The case was the subject of a play by author Jens Bjørneboe (Tilfellet Torgersen, 'The Torgersen Case'). Torgersen himself wrote several books.

== Literature ==
- "Rettssikkerhet og fordommer" by Per Brandtzæg (Newspaper article) (in English: "Legal certainty and prejudice")
- Tennøe, Jan (2014-03-12). "Dreier seg om vår rettssikkerhet". Aftenposten. p. 7. (in English: "It is about our rule of law")

== See also ==
- Liland Affair
- Fritz Moen
