= Gjert Ingebrigtsen =

Norwegian sports coach (born 1966)

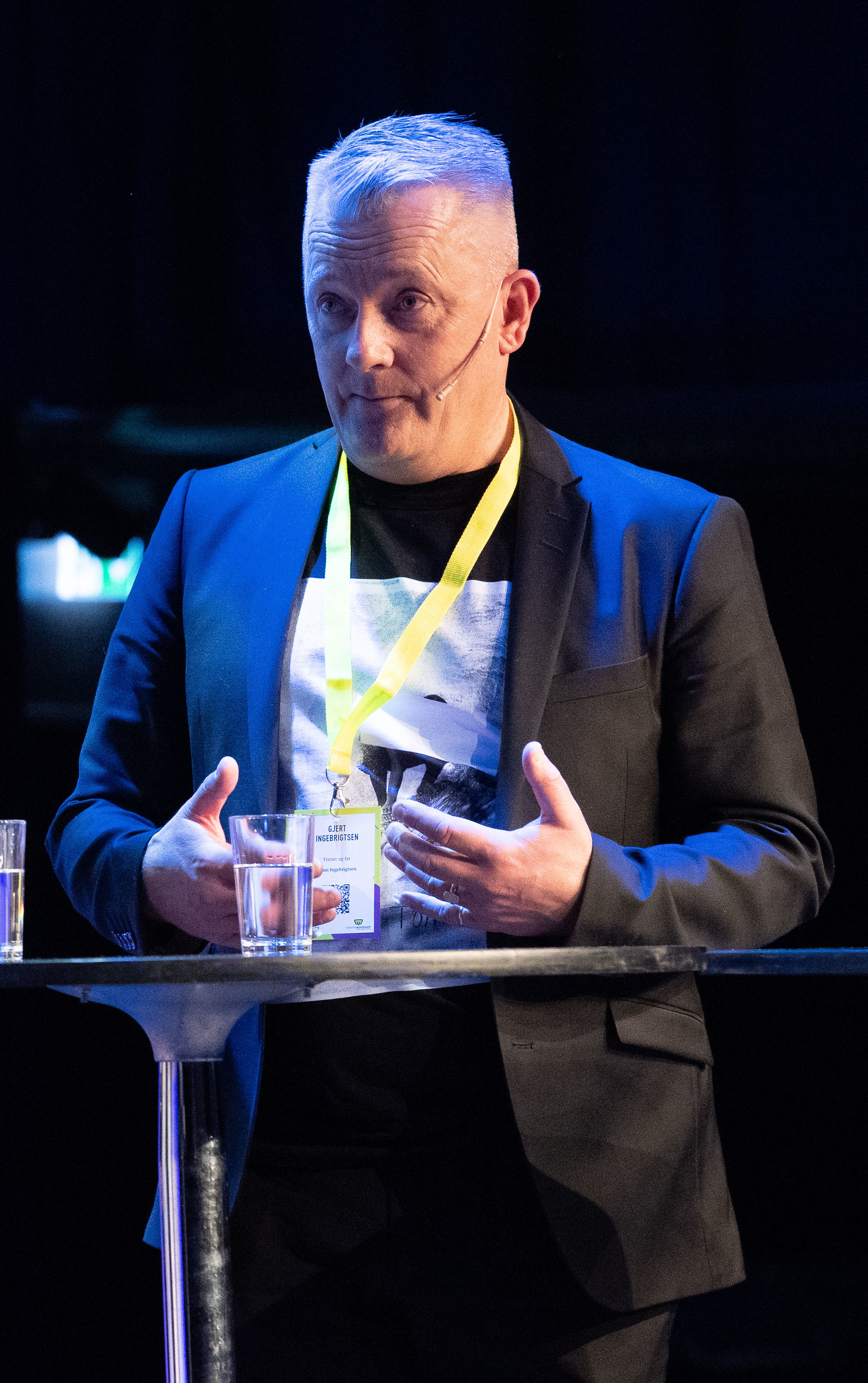
- Ingebrigtsen in May 2019
- Born: 12 January 1966 (age 60); Båtsfjord, Norway
- Occupation: Sports coach
- Organization: Sandnes IL
- Partner: Tone Eva Ingebrigtsen (née Tønnessen)
- Children: Kristoffer Ingebrigtsen; Henrik Ingebrigtsen; Filip Ingebrigtsen; Martin Ingebrigtsen; Jakob Ingebrigtsen; Ingrid Ingebrigtsen; William Ingebrigtsen
- Awards: Norwegian Sports Coach of the Year (2018)

Gjert Arne Ingebrigtsen (born 12 January 1966) is a Norwegian athletics coach. He coached his sons Henrik, Filip, and Jakob until 2022, and later coached Narve Gilje Nordås, Kieran Lumb, Maël Gouyette, and Per Svela until 2026. In 2026, he coached Portuguese runners Patrícia Silva and José Carlos Pinto, and subsequently began coaching Laura Taborda and Águeda Marqués.

Since 2023, the Norwegian Athletics Association has repeatedly denied Ingebrigtsen accreditation at international competitions, citing athlete safety concerns. Although he received accreditation through Portugal, European Athletics revoked it during the 2026 European Athletics Championships on safeguarding grounds. The Portuguese athletics federation appealed the decision twice, while Pinto publicly criticized the revocation.

== Career ==
Ingebrigtsen coached three of his sons until 2022; those sons all had significant achievements in 2018. At the 2018 European Athletics Championships, Jakob won gold medals in both 1500 m and 5000 m, while Henrik won a silver medal in 5,000 m and placed fourth in 1500 m. Filip won gold medal at the 2018 European Cross Country Championships. Ingebrigtsen was awarded the title Norwegian Sports Coach of the Year for 2018, awarded at Idrettsgallaen in January 2019.

Henrik, Filip and Jakob have all competed at the Summer Olympics. Henrik placed fifth in 1500 metres at the 2012 Summer Olympics in London, and reached the semifinal in 1500 metres at the 2016 Summer Olympics. Both Filip and Jakob competed in 1500 metres at the 2020 Summer Olympics in Tokyo, where Jakob won the gold medal and set Olympic record with time 3:28.32.

The Ingebrigtsen family has been featured in the television series Team Ingebrigtsen (2016–2021) and Ingebrigtsen: Born to Run (2024).

Ingebrigtsen coached Narve Nordås, who won bronze at the 2023 World Championships in Budapest.

In 2026, he ended his coaching partnerships with Nordås and Kieran Lumb, Maël Gouyette and Per Svela and media wrote that he was stepping down as a coach; however, he is still coaching José Carlos Pinto and Patricia Silva, as of August 2026.

Besides coaching athletes, he still works within the field of logistics (as of 2025).

=== Conflict between the federation NFIF and Ingebrigtsen ===
In regard to Norwegian sports authorities possibly giving accreditation at international championships: In April 2026, Norwegian Sports Confederation (NIF) decided that they will not give him accreditation in 2026; However, one of his lawyers said that no legal measures will be taken, so that a positive dialogue might take place in the future.

In early August 2025, Ingebrigtsen coached at the national championships in Norway; however, NFIF had no say in regard to Ingebrigtsen coaching there.

In November 2025, påtalenemnda, a committee of NIF, decided that NIF will not prosecute Ingebrigtsen for violating the "rules of sports"; Furthermore, the Norwegian Athletics Association (NFIF), will keep that decision in mind. However, that association still claims that there has been a violation of [the association's] ethics guideline.

Earlier (July 2025), commentator Ernst A. Lersveen, said that Gjert Ingebrigtsen should not be punished by Norwegian Olympic and Paralympic Committee and Confederation of Sports. Furthermore, the federation should "take to heart", the court verdict of 2025 where Ingebrigtsen was acquitted of allegedly having harmed an athlete.

Earlier (October 2023), the board of directors, of a Norwegian federation banned him from getting accreditation. The ban will last until the board of directors decide differently, according to the Norwegian federation (31 August 2025). The justification for the ban, was to give a "safe framework with athletes at the center", according to the federation's press release in 2023; However, now there is disagreement within the federation, because, the ban is discrimination against Narve Gilje Nordås, because he will not get to bring his coach to the 2025 World Athletics Championships, while other Norwegian athletes can. That Jakob Asserson Ingebrigtsen does not want to meet Gjert Ingebrigtsen at championships or other competitions, is basically why the Norwegian federation has not ended the ban; Jakob is Norway's "greatest star" [in regard to running] as of 2026.

According to media, it has been obvious that the Norwegian federation is giving preferential treatment to Jakob Ingebrigtsen over Gjert Inbebrigtsen's team member, at the 2025 World Athletics Championships; Jakob has two people (brothers of him), that have gotten accreditation, while Narve Gilje Nordås has not gotten accreditation for anyone at his side.

On 14 September, a runner on Gjert Ingebrigtsen's team, was one of the runners that knocked Jakob Ingebrigtsen out of a heat before the semi-finals (1500 m), at the 2025 World Championship.

== Legal affairs ==
In 2026, three of his sons (Jakob, Filip and Henrik) lost their bid to secure rights to some names and expressions; That conflict against Gjert Ingebrigtsen, was looked at by Patentstyret, a governmental agency.

In regard to petitioning the government for compensation for the part of [overreaching] prosecution in the 2025 trial, that did not lead to conviction; case work is being done (as of Q4 2026) on Gjert Ingebrigtsen's petition for compensation from Statens sivilrettsforvaltning (SRF); the sum that is being claimed, is not a matter of public record.

=== 2025 courtcase and final verdict ===
In June 2025, Gjert was convicted of abuse against his daughter, Ingrid, for a 2022 incident where he used a wet towel to strike her on the face. He was given a 15-day suspended prison sentence and ordered to pay Norwegian krone 10,000 as compensation. He was acquitted of all other charges. The trial lasted seven weeks.

== Family ==
Gjert Ingebrigtsen was born in Båtsfjord Municipality, and resides in Sandnes. He is married to Tone Eva Tønnessen. The couple has seven children, including middle-distance runners Henrik, Filip, and Jakob.

== See also ==
• Ingebrigtsen family
