= Wenche Skjæggestad =

Norwegian judge (born 1943)

Wenche Skjæggestad (born 9 September 1943) is a Norwegian judge.

She was born in Oslo, and graduated with the cand.jur. degree in 1978. She worked as a police superintendent for four years, and then deputy judge in Ytre Follo from 1983 to 1984. She then worked for the Director of Public Prosecutions, as an acting assistant secretary in the Ministry of Justice from 1985 to 1987 and as acting deputy governor in Bredtveit prison from 1987 to 1990. In 1990 she was appointed as a judge in Oslo City Court; she was later promoted to Borgarting Court of Appeal. One of her more central marks on Norwegian history was made when she read the October 2004 verdict that acquitted Fritz Moen for murder. She also read the verdict that acquitted Jon Lech Johansen, in the high-profile appeal trial in December 2003. She has also chaired the supervisory council of Ullersmo prison.
