= Per Brandtzæg =

Per Brandtzæg (9 June 1936 – 11 September 2016) was a Norwegian dentist.

He was a professor of medicine at the University of Oslo. In November 2006 he was proclaimed Commander of the Order of St. Olav in recognition of his work. He was a member of the Norwegian Academy of Science and Letters.

He was also known to the general public as a proponent to retry the case of Fredrik Fasting Torgersen.

Awards
| Preceded by Knut Aukland | Recipient of the Fridtjof Nansen Excellent Research Award in Science; 2003 | Succeeded by Ola Bratteli |
