= Eilert Stang Lund =

Norwegian judge (born 1939)

Eilert Stang Lund (born 15 July 1939) is a Norwegian judge.

He graduated as cand.jur. from the University of Oslo in 1965 and as Master of Law from Harvard University in 1973. He then worked as a consultant in the Ministry of Justice and the Police from 1965, as an attorney and lawyer in the Office of the Attorney General of Norway from 1967, and as a private lawyer from 1975 to 1995. He is a Supreme Court Justice from 1995 to his retirement in 2009.

He is a second cousin of fellow Justice Ketil Lund.

On 5 February 2008, the Standing Committee on Scrutiny and Constitutional Affairs of the Parliament of Norway recommended that a commission be named to investigate and, if warranted, prosecute for impeachment three of the Norwegian Supreme Court Justices who presided over the cases of Fritz Moen, a victim of miscarriage of justice. The three were Lund, Magnus Matningsdal and Karin Maria Bruzelius. However, when the case was treated by the Standing Committee on Justice three months later, it was closed.

Lund has also been a member of the board of the Norwegian Glacier Museum.
