= Magnus Matningsdal =

Norwegian judge (born 1951)

Magnus Matningsdal (born 29 September 1951 in Hå) is a Norwegian judge.

He graduated as cand.jur. in 1976 and then took the dr.juris degree in 1986. He was a professor at the University of Bergen from 1987 to 1989, and assisting professor from 1989 to 1997. At the same time he was a judge in Jæren from 1989 and presiding judge in Gulating from 1996 to 1997. He is a Supreme Court Justice from 1997.

On 5 February 2008, the Standing Committee on Scrutiny and Constitutional Affairs of the Norwegian Parliament recommended that a commission be named to investigate and, if warranted, prosecute for impeachment three of the Norwegian Supreme Court Justices who presided over the cases of Fritz Moen, a victim of miscarriage of justice. The three were Matningsdal, Karin Maria Bruzelius and Eilert Stang Lund. However, when the case was treated by the Standing Committee on Justice three months later, it was closed.
