= Ketil Lund =

Norwegian judge (born 1939)

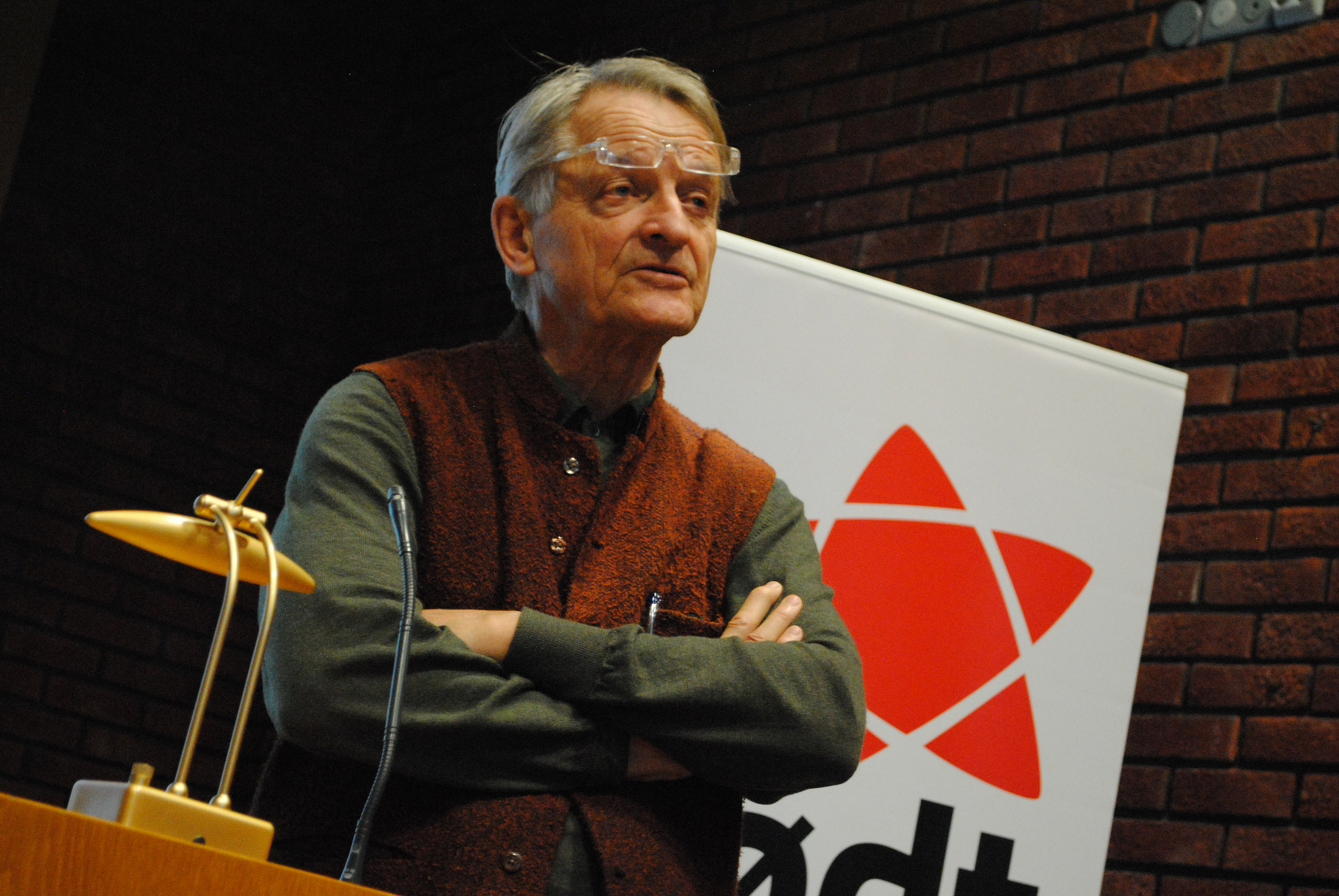
Ketil Lund

Ketil Lund (born 14 October 1939) is a Norwegian judge.

He was born in Oslo as a son of barrister and director Bernt Bjelke Lund (1898–1956) and Irlin Sommerfelt (1902–1974). He is a paternal grandson of Jens Michael Lund. From 1963 to 1967 he was married to curator Inger Marie Grue; he then married artist Mirella Bussoli. He is a second cousin of fellow Justice Eilert Stang Lund.

He finished his secondary education at Oslo Cathedral School in 1958 and graduated with the cand.jur. degree from the University of Oslo in 1965. He first worked as a deputy judge in Ålesund for one year, as a university lecturer for three years and the Ministry of Industry for one year before working in the Office of the Norwegian Attorney General of Civil Affairs from 1971. In 1978 he started a private lawyer's firm, with among others the Norwegian Non-Fiction Writers' and Translators’ Association as a client. He was a Supreme Court Justice from 1990 to his retirement in 2009.

He sat on the commission that delivered the Norwegian Official Report 1988:8 and chaired the commission that delivered the Norwegian Official Report 1992: On Lobotomy. From 1994 to 1996 he chaired the Lund commission, which looked into illegal political surveillance in Norway in the post–World War II period.

In 2008 he was the cofounder of The International Commission of Jurists - ICJ - Norwegian Section. He is a commissioner of the ICJ from 2010. In 2010 Lund, then retired from the Supreme Court of Norway publicly criticised Norwegian drug policy, stating that the dominant focus on punishment of drug users was unsuccessful and dehumanizing. In criticising Norwegian drug prohibition, Lund follows in the footsteps of Johs. Andenæs, one of the most prominent former professors of law in Norway, and the Criminal Justice Commission of 2002. He has been a critical voice in the human rights field, particularly about issues regarding surveillance and coercive psychiatric care.

== Awards ==
Lund received the Ossietzky Award in 1998.
