= José Carlos Pinto (runner) =

Portuguese middle-distance runner

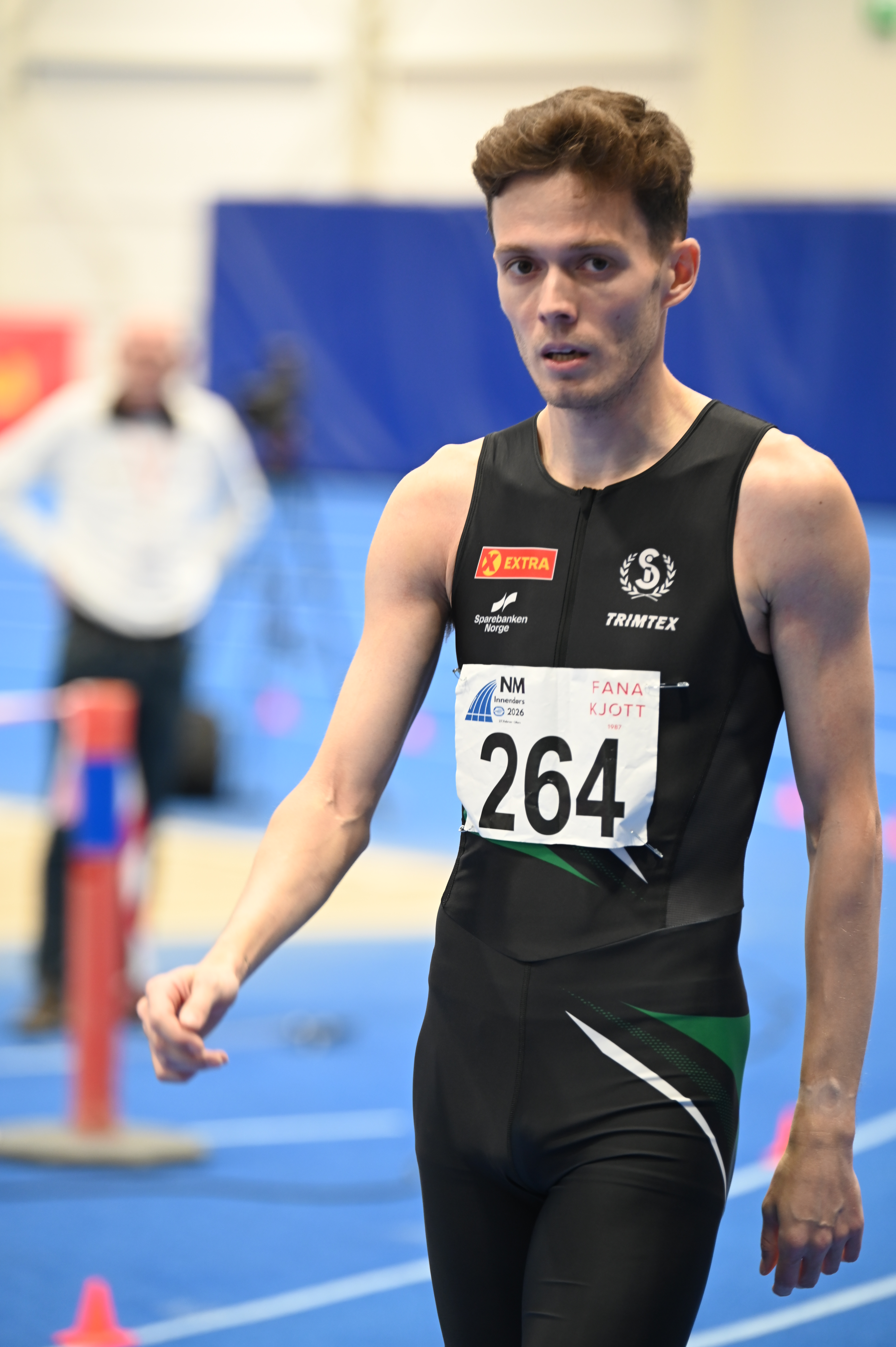
- Pinto in 2026

Personal information
- Full name: José Carlos Marques Pinto
- Nationality: Portuguese
- Born: 3 May 1997 (age 29)

Sport
- Sport: Athletics
- Event: Middle-distance running

Achievements and titles
- Personal bests: 800m: 1:45.12 (2025); 1500m: 3:31.47 (2026); 3000m: 7:46.31 (2025); 5000m: 12:59.75 (2026); Road; 5km: 13:10 (2025); 10km: 27:38 (2026)
Medal record
Men's athletics
Representing Portugal
Mediterranean Games
Gold medal – first place	2026 Taranto	5000 m

José Carlos Marques Pinto (born 3 May 1997) is a Portuguese middle-distance runner. He competed over 1500 metres at the 2025 World Athletics Championships.

== Biography ==
He is from Lagares da Beira, in the municipality of Oliveira do Hospital in the Coimbra District. He is a member of Sporting CP athletics club.

Shortly before competing for Portugal at the 2025 European Running Championships in Belgium, he began working with Gjert Ingebrigtsen, with the working relationship becoming official in the weeks following that. Pinto began having positive results quickly; that spring and into early summer he won five consecutive races.

In June 2025, he lowered his personal best for the 1500 metres to 3:35.10 at the 2025 Bislett Games. He then competed over 3000 metres race at the Trond Mohn Games in Bergen, Norway, finishing with a time of 7:44.31 to set a new personal best and moved to twelfth on the Portuguese all-time list. The following month, he won the 1,500 meters at the Meeting Spitzen Leichtathletik, in Lucerne in a time of 3:34.60. He then he ran 3:31.94 for the 1500 metres to move to third on the Portuguese all-time list at that distance behind only Isaac Nader and Rui Silva, as he won at the Night of Athletics in Belgium. The time also met the auto qualification standard for the upcoming world championships.

He was a semi-finalist in the 1500 metres at the 2025 World Athletics Championships in Tokyo, Japan, finishing runner-up in his qualifying heat behind former world champion Jake Wightman of Great Britain in 3:37.09.

In November, he won the 2025 Portuguese Cross Country Championships. On 31 December, he won the 5 km Cursa dels Nassos, a World Athletics Label event, held in Barcelona.

On 11 January 2026, Pinto broke the Portuguese 10 km national record in Valencia, with 27:37. In February 2026, he placed second with his Sporting team in the mixed relay at the ECCC Cross Country in Albufeira, Portugal. In August, he competed at the 2026 European Athletics Championships in Birmingham, England, in the 1500 metres.
