= Liland affair =

Norwegian murder trial

The Liland affair was a Norwegian murder trial which gave rise to a miscarriage of justice. The affair became a grave embarrassment to the Norwegian criminal justice system.

On December 24, 1969, two men were found dead in Fredrikstad. They were thought to be the victims of a double axe murder. The building where the bodies were found was a meeting place for people with substance abuse problems, and the authorities arrested three substance abusers as suspects. Two of them were released, but Per Kristian Liland was imprisoned. In July, 1970, Liland was convicted of the crime. The conviction was based on the theory that the murders had taken place on 22 December, and witness reports that the victims were still alive after that date were ignored.

Despite a number of appeals to the Supreme Court during the 1970s, Liland remained imprisoned until June 1993. The case was then reopened. Witness testimonies established that the murder did not take place on 22 December. It was also revealed that, during the original trial, the prosecution had neglected to present evidence which would indicate Liland's innocence. The court acquitted Liland in 1994, and he died in 1996 as a free man. The murder case remains unsolved, and has become a subject to Norway's statute of limitations.

== The crime and initial arrests ==
At about 10:45 am on 24 December 1969, two men, John Olav Larsen and Håkon Edvard Johansen were found murdered at Glemmengata 73 in the Norwegian town Fredrikstad. Both had severe head injuries and there was a lot of blood at the scene. It was assumed that an axe was the murder weapon. The address was known to be frequented by people who abused drugs or alcohol and was referred to locally as "little hell". Three substance abusers were arrested on their way to the scene of the crime. Two of them were later freed, while the third, Per Kristian Liland, was imprisoned and in 1970 convicted of the crime. Liland always maintained his innocence. After serving his entire sentence he was finally acquitted in 1994 after it became clear that he was a victim of a miscarriage of justice. The case remains unsolved and is now subject to Norway's statute of limitations.

== Prosecution and judgement ==
Per Kristian Liland was a known substance abuser in Fredrikstad and was arrested near the scene of the crime on 24 December 1969, just before midday. He was charged with the murders and remanded in custody on 27 December. He remained on remand until his conviction at Eidsivating Court of Appeal on 3 July 1970. He was convicted of the premeditated murder of Larsen and the murder of Johansen (in an attempt to conceal a punishable offence). He was sentenced to life imprisonment (at the time that meant 12 years) with an additional sentence of up to 10 years if it was considered he could repeat the crime due to mental disorders. (The sentences (livsvarig fengsel and sikiring) no longer exist in that form in Norwegian law.)

The time the murders were carried out was an important point in the case. Per Liland could only be connected to the murders if they had been committed on the afternoon or evening of 22 December. A local GP, Mikael Frestand, was called to the scene before the Norwegian police unit which deals with serious crime arrived in Fredrikstad. He arrived at the scene shortly after midday and testified that the bodies were "cold and stiff". He entered 24 December 1969 as the date of death for both victims' death certificates which were issued several days later. In the section on the form which dealt with when the injuries had taken place, he entered "23/12-24/12?". At the start of the investigation it was assumed that the murders had taken place at some time between 19:30 on 23 December and 02:00 on 24 December.

Court-appointed experts claimed that the murders could have taken place on 22 December. Even though several witnesses also claimed that the murder victims had been seen and that activity had been registered at the address at a later point in time, the court decided to ignore this testimony and found that Per Liland had committed the murders on 22 December. Alf Nordhus, the lawyer who represented Liland appealed against the handling of the case and the sentencing at the Supreme Court. The appeal was rejected on 28 November 1970.

== Initial attempts to have the case reviewed ==
Liland, through Alf Nordhus sought to have the case reviewed on 27 December 1971. The application included 1700 pages of documents collected by Sten and Vibeke Ekroth and which also included sound recordings of witnesses who stated that the victims had been seen alive after the murders were supposed to have taken place. Sten Ekroth, a Swedish pop music manager was on an engagement trip with his wife-to-be Vibeke and by chance came to play an important role in the case. The documentation the Ekroths provided formed the basis of the application to have the case looked at again. The couple was newly in love and wanted to document everything they experienced. For that reason they smuggled a tape recorder with them into court. They followed the case closely and had the impression that Liland was innocent. The application to have the case reopened was rejected by Eidsivating Court of Appeal on 7 May 1975. The decision was appealed to the Supreme Court but was rejected by the Court's Appeal committee on 5 March 1976.

== Imprisonment ==
Per Liland served out his sentence until 22 June 1983. At the time Norwegian law allowed sentences of prisoners who were considered a danger to society to be extended by a maximum of ten years. His sentence was extended to the maximum permitted and he remained in prison until 22 June 1993.

== Further attempts to have the case reopened ==
On 23 June 1993, the day after his sentence ended, Liland started a new attempt to have the case reopened. The case was advanced by Ole Jakob Bae and Cato Schiøtz, who later were appointed to the defence in the reopened case.

== Basis for review ==
A decisive factor in Liland's conviction was that the murders were deemed to have taken place on 22 December. There were several indications that they had actually taken place on 23 December or 24 December, when Per Liland could not be connected to the crime scene.

== New medical experts ==
Analysis of the victim's blood showed that Larsen had a blood alcohol level of 0.023% at the time of death, while no alcohol was detected in Johansen's blood. There had been a party at the scene of the crime on 22 December and much alcohol had been consumed. Both murder victims were characterised as alcoholics and it was assumed that both were drunk during the party. The original medical experts Jon Lundevall and Johan Chr. Giertsen which the prosecution had relied on therefore concluded that Johansen must have lived for at least 13 hours after having been injured. Testimony from new medical experts did not support this theory. It was also revealed that the two original experts had disagreed but that this had not been revealed during the original court case. It also emerged that blood was found at the scene which had not solidified.

== Witness statements ==
At the original trial several witnesses claimed to have seen the two murder victims alive after 22 December. The court decided to ignore these statements. Sten and Vibeke Ekroth had, after the trial, questioned several witnesses who made similar claims. During the reopening of the case further witnesses confirmed that the murder victims had been alive after 22 December.

== Coupon in Larsen's pocket ==
It came to light that police officers Hageløkke and Restad, who investigated the scene of the murder had found a food coupon in Larsen's back pocket. The coupon had been issued by Fredrikstad municipality and had a value of 65 kroner. The report detailed that the coupon had the number 121013 and that it was dated 23 December. The prosecution had neglected to present this evidence to the court. It could have, by itself, been enough to acquit Per Liland in the first instance.

Further examination revealed that dates in the report had been changed from 23 December to 22 December and that the coupon number had been changed from 121013 to 121031. The coupon itself disappeared and Fredrikstad municipality was also unable to find a copy of the coupon.

== Review ==
On 29 April 1994 Eidsivating Court of Appeal ruled that the case should be reviewed. The prosecution appealed against the decision, but the appeal was rejected by the Supreme Court on 2 September 1994.

== Acquittal ==
New charges were brought against Liland. Before the main proceedings, the prosecution informed that court that it intended to drop its objection to a full acquittal. The case proceeded on 21 November 1994. Without any evidence being presented, the court acquitted Liland.

== Compensation ==
Per Liland immediately applied for compensation under Norwegian trial law. The court awarded him 2,900,000 kroner for lost income, 840,000 for lost future income and 10,000,000 kroner for non-economic losses, a total of 13,740,000 kroner.

Per Liland died in 1996.

== See also ==
- Fritz Moen
- Fredrik Fasting Torgersen
- Bjugn Affair
