= Ståle Eskeland =

Norwegian jurist

- Born: 25 August 1943; Stavanger, Norway
- Died: 26 December 2015 (aged 72)
- Occupation: Jurist

Ståle Eskeland (25 August 1943 – 26 December 2015) was a Norwegian jurist.

Born in Stavanger, he took the cand.jur. degree in 1970 and the dr.juris degree in 1988. He was an associate professor in the sociology of law for some time, and has also worked in the Norwegian Ministry of Justice, the Norwegian Pollution Control Authority and the Norwegian Labour Inspection Authority. In 1990 he was appointed professor of jurisprudence at the University of Oslo. His juridical publications include Den psykiatriske pasient og loven (1983, 1994), Fangerett (1989), Økonomiske forbrytelser og straff (co-ed., 1994), Grunnloven og Schengensamarbeidet (1997) and Strafferett (2000).

He is also known to the general public as a proponent to retry the case of Fredrik Fasting Torgersen.

He died on 26 December 2015, aged 72.
