= 2017 European Athletics Indoor Championships – Men's 3000 metres =

The men's 3000 metres event at the 2017 European Athletics Indoor Championships will be held on 3 March 2017 at 18:25 (heats) and on 5 March 16:55 (final) local time.

== Medalists ==
Gold	Silver	Bronze
Adel Mechaal; Spain	Henrik Ingebrigtsen; Norway	Richard Ringer; Germany

== Records ==
Standing records prior to the 2017 European Athletics Indoor Championships
World record	Daniel Komen (KEN)	7:24.90	Budapest, Hungary	6 February 1998
European record	Sergio Sánchez (ESP)	7:32.41	Valencia, Spain	13 February 2010
Championship record	Ali Kaya (TUR)	7:38.42	Prague, Czech Republic	7 March 2015
World Leading	Ryan Hill (USA)	7:40.80	New York City, United States	11 February 2017
European Leading	Andrew Butchart (GBR)	7:41.05	New York City, United States	11 February 2017

== Results ==
=== Heats ===
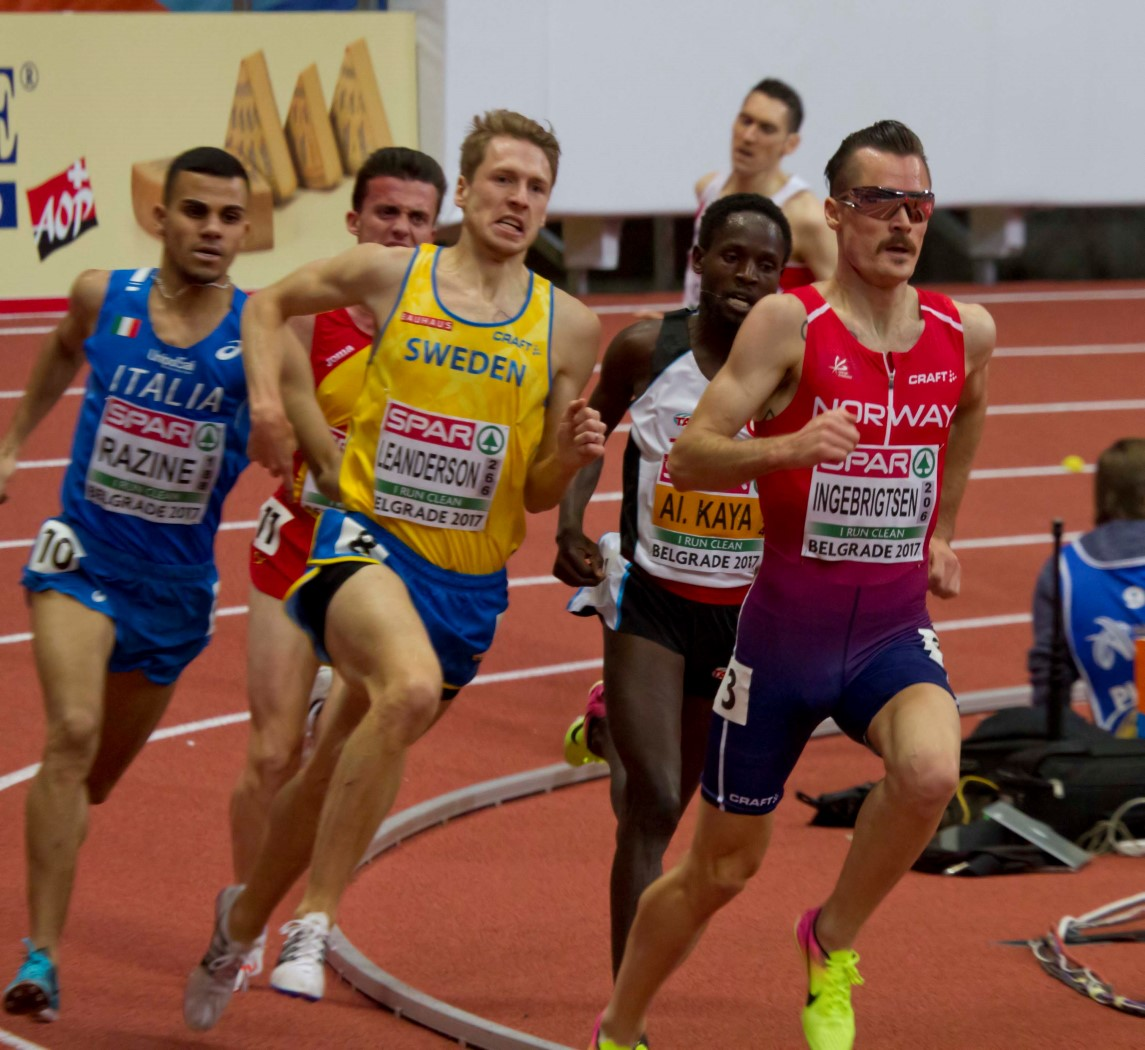
Heat 1

Qualification: First 4 in each heat (Q) and the next 4 fastest (q) advance to the Final.

Rank	Heat	Athlete	Nationality	Time	Note
1	1	Jonas Leanderson	Sweden	7:54.93	Q
2	1	Marouan Razine	Italy	7:55.17	Q
3	1	Henrik Ingebrigtsen	Norway	7:55.26	Q
4	1	Carlos Mayo	Spain	7:55.58	Q
5	1	Ali Kaya	Turkey	7:56.36	q
6	1	Andreas Vojta	Austria	7:56.52	q
7	2	Hayle İbrahimov	Azerbaijan	7:57.74	Q
8	2	Aras Kaya	Turkey	7:58.61	Q
9	2	Richard Ringer	Germany	7:58.77	Q
10	2	Adel Mechaal	Spain	7:58.94	Q
11	1	Ramazan Özdemir	Turkey	7:59.35	q
12	2	Yemaneberhan Crippa	Italy	7:59.76	q
13	2	Nick Goolab	Great Britain	8:02.49	
14	1	Volodymyr Kyts	Ukraine	8:04.96	
15	2	Marius Øyre Vedvik	Norway	8:06.69	
16	1	Jordi Torrents	Spain	8:12.51	
17	2	Dušan Makević	Serbia	8:14.34	
18	1	Jakub Zemaník	Czech Republic	8:14.50	
19	2	Samir Dahmani	France	8:15.90	
20	2	Hlynur Andrésson	Iceland	8:29.00	
21	2	Staffan Ek	Sweden	8:56.06	
	2	Tomas Cotter	Ireland	DQ	R163.3b
	1	Morhad Amdouni	France	DNS	

=== Final ===
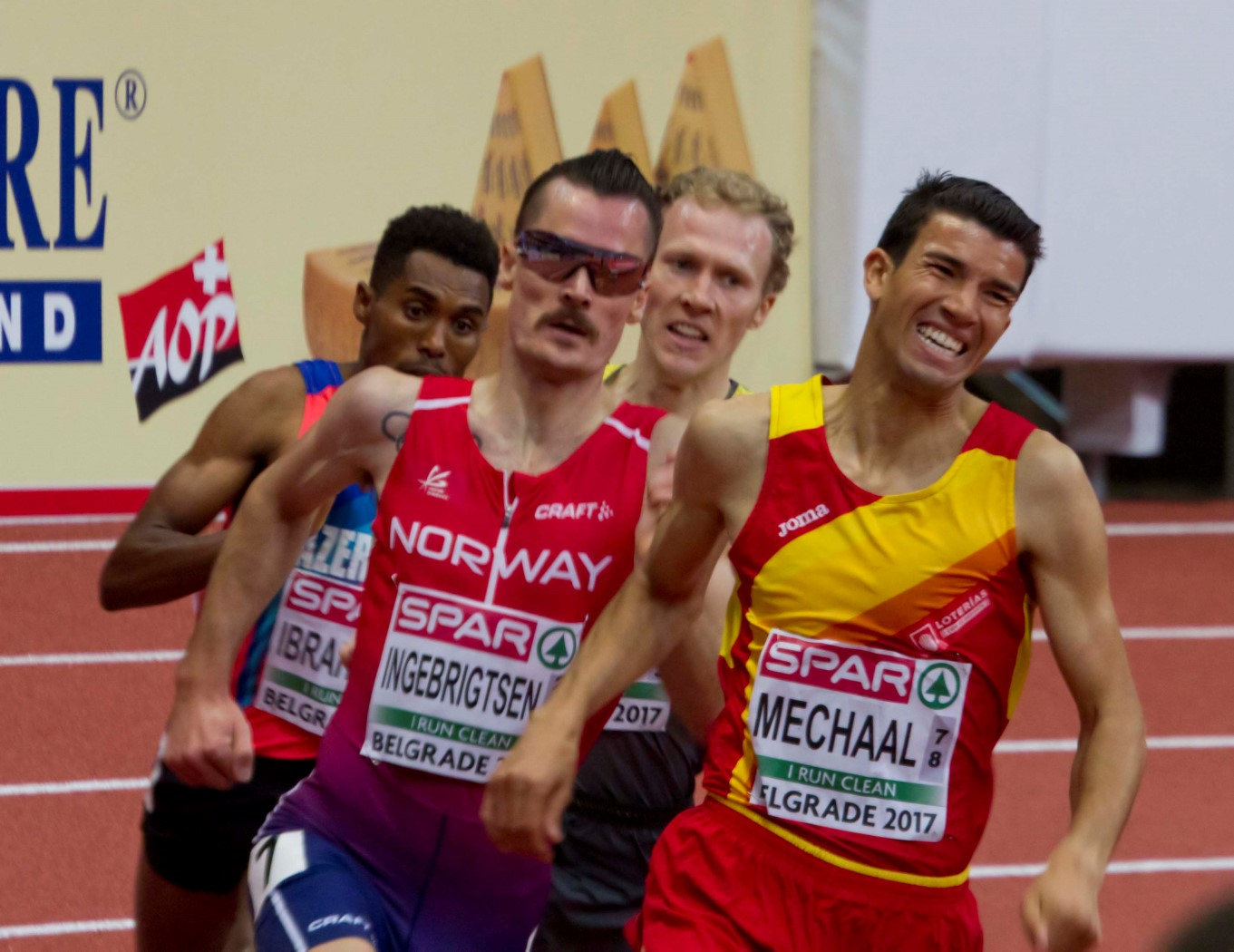
The final

Rank	Athlete	Nationality	Time	Note
1st place, gold medalist(s)	Adel Mechaal	Spain	8:00.60	
2nd place, silver medalist(s)	Henrik Ingebrigtsen	Norway	8:00.93	
3rd place, bronze medalist(s)	Richard Ringer	Germany	8:01.01	
4	Hayle Ibrahimov	Azerbaijan	8:03.19	
5	Jonas Leanderson	Sweden	8:03.91	
6	Marouan Razine	Italy	8:04.19	
7	Yemaneberhan Crippa	Italy	8:05.63	
8	Carlos Mayo	Spain	8:06.15	
9	Ali Kaya	Turkey	8:08.92	
10	Andreas Vojta	Austria	8:09.18	
11	Ramazan Özdemir	Turkey	8:10.99	
12	Aras Kaya	Turkey	8:16.36	
