= Ingebrigtsen family =

Norwegian family of athletes

- Athletics
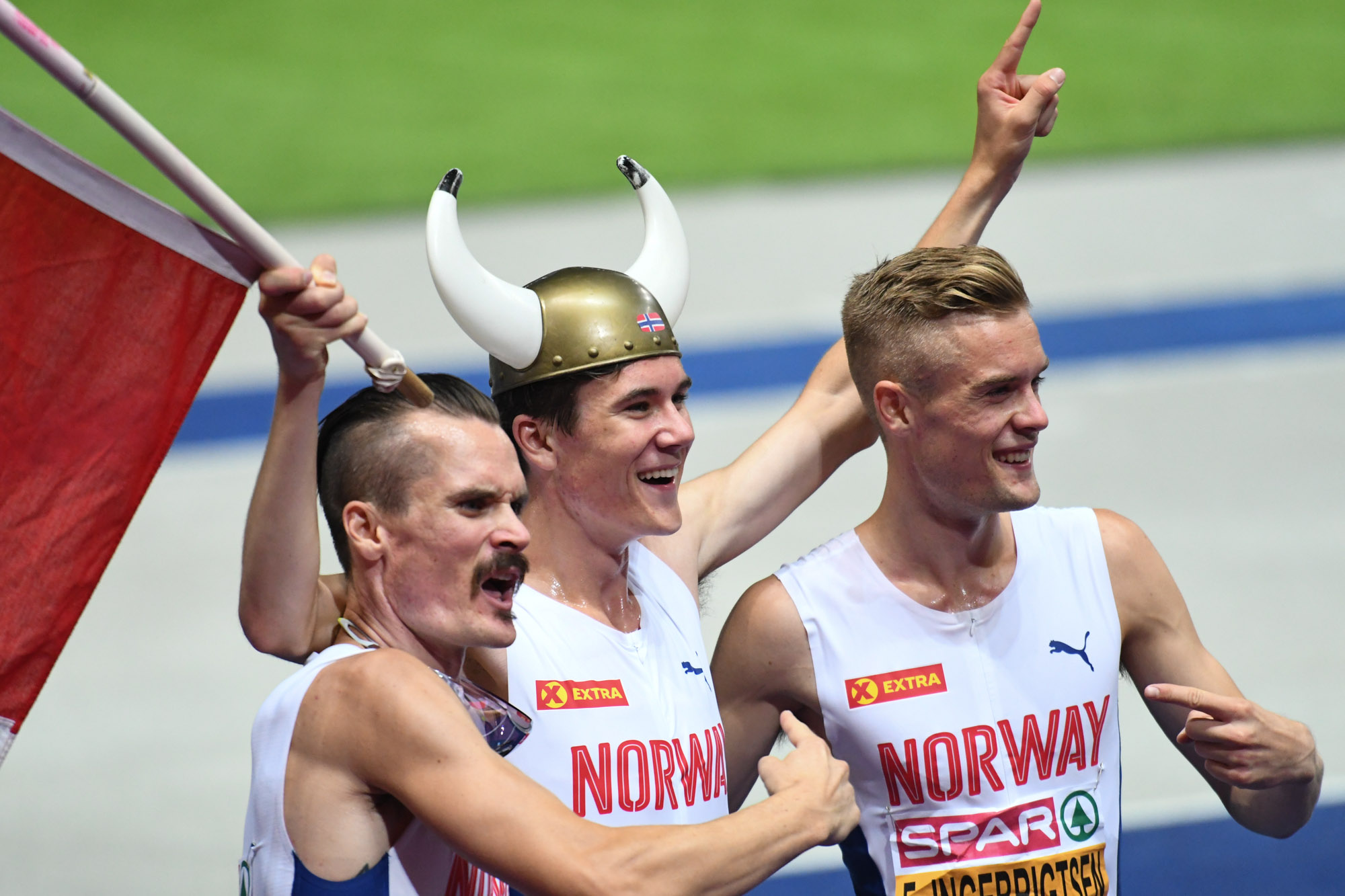
- Jakob, Filip, and Henrik Ingebrigtsen at the 2018 European Athletics Championships.
- Country: Norway
- Current region: Sandnes

The Ingebrigtsen family is a Norwegian family of athletes, including father Gjert, mother Tone Eva (née Tønnessen), and seven children. Three of the sons, Henrik, Filip, and Jakob, are professional middle distance runners. The other four children are Kristoffer, Martin, Ingrid, and William.

They have been called "the most fascinating family in athletics" by The Daily Telegraph, and "European athletics' most remarkable family dynasty" by the BBC. In addition to athletic achievements, they are known for their intense training regimes from a young age and focus on athletic success.

Gjert coached Henrik, Filip, and Jakob until 2022, despite not having formal athletics or coaching experience. In 2018, Gjert was named Norwegian sports coach of the year. In 2023, Henrik, Filip, and Jakob released a letter accusing Gjert of physical, mental, and verbal abuse. Gjert was formally indicted by Norwegian authorities for the abuse of two of his children, with the trial running from March to May 2025. Gjert was convicted of abusing his daughter Ingrid, but acquitted of other charges due to lack of evidence. He was given a 15-day suspended prison sentence and ordered to pay NOK 10,000 ($1,010) in damages.

== Family background ==
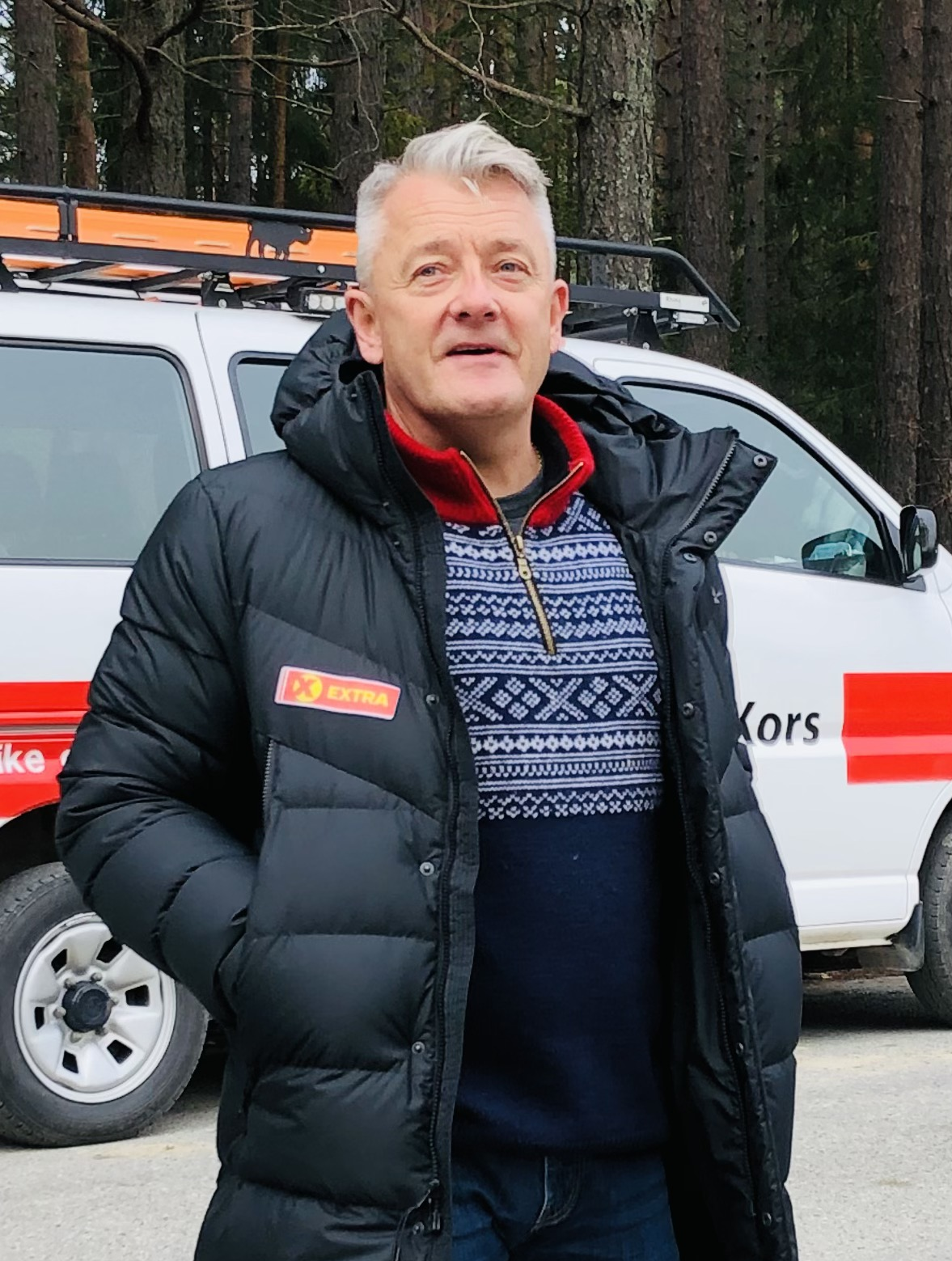
Gjert Ingebrigtsen in 2020

The Ingebrigtsen family is based in Sandnes, Norway. Gjert Arne Ingebrigtsen (born 12 January 1966) was born in the Båtsfjord Municipality in northern Norway. Tone Eva Tønnessen comes from Stavanger, a city in the southwest. According to Henrik, Gjert and Tone Eva had no background in athletics, and came from families of "fishermen and farmers." In addition to coaching, Gjert has worked at a Norwegian logistic company, and does accounting for Tone Eva's hairdressing business in Sandnes.

== Athletics ==
The Ingebrigtsen family is primarily known for the middle-distance running careers of brothers Henrik, Filip, and Jakob. All three have represented Norway at the Summer Olympics multiple times, and are all European champions in the 1500 meters (Henrik in 2012; Filip in 2016; and Jakob in 2018, 2022, and 2024). In addition, Jakob has won Olympic gold medals in the 1500 m and 5000 m, and set multiple world records.

== Media coverage ==
=== Team Ingebrigtsen (2016-2021) ===
As part of an attempt to gain sponsors for his son's running careers, Gjert authorized a reality television show about his son's running training, competition, and family dynamics. The show, titled Team Ingebrigtsen, was aired by Norwegian public broadcaster NRK from 2016 to 2021. According to the family, the concept for the show was inspired years earlier, when Jakob appeared as a ten year old on a Norwegian show that profiled young athletes. The New York Times described the show as "relentlessly authentic", and it became so popular in Norway that Jakob has stated he has trouble going outside in his home country without being recognized.

=== Ingebrigtsen: Born to Run (2024) ===
In September 2024, Amazon Prime released the first season of Ingebrigtsen: Born to Run, a six-episode documentary series. It primarily follows Jakob in the lead up to the 2024 Paris Olympics, as he marries his fiancé Elisabeth Asserson and prepares for their first child. The series also stars brothers Henrik and Filip, as they struggle with their own running careers and growing families. Gjert, their father, is absent from the show, after the brothers released a statement in October 2023 accusing him of physical abuse during their childhoods. The Irish Times called the show "part family reality show, part training manual, part travelogue", and that it demonstrates how "the once closely-knit and seemingly idyllic Ingebrigtsen family unit is now broken beyond repair."

== Domestic abuse trial ==
=== Initial allegations and investigation ===
In October 2023, Jakob, Filip, and Henrik released a statement accusing their father and former coach of "aggression, control, and physical violence", also saying that he "took the joy out of the sport they once loved". The next day, Martin expressed support for their father claiming that while Gjert was not a "conventional father" he had never been afraid of him.

In April 2024, Gjert was formally charged by Norwegian authorities with one count of physical abuse against his child, though they did not disclose which Ingebrigtsen sibling. Five other charges were dropped due to lack of evidence, and one charge due to statue of limitations expiring.

In September 2024 the oldest brother Kristoffer also accused their father of abuse in an interview where he claims both to have been was a victim of their father and to have witnessed their father abusing his younger siblings. He also accuses their mother of being complicit in their father's abuse.

On 29 November 2024, public prosecutor Birgitte Budal Løvlund announced that their office had formally indicted Gjert for physical, mental, and verbal abuse of two of his children: Jakob and Ingrid. Specifically, Gjert is charged with seven counts of breaching the Norwegian Criminal Code's section 282, which concerns abuse in close relationships. Gjert denied the allegations, calling them "baseless." The charges carried a maximum sentence of six years in prison.

=== Trial proceedings ===
The trial began on 24 March 2025 at the South-Rogaland District Court in the city of Sandnes, Norway, and was expected to last six weeks. Over 30 witnesses were called, including all seven Ingebrigtsen siblings.

During his testimony, Jakob stated "My upbringing was very much characterised by fear ... Everything was controlled and decided for me." He described multiple specific instances of alleged abuse, including two events in 2008, when Jakob was eight years old, where he claims his father hit him in the face and kicked him in the stomach. Ingrid testified that Gjert had whipped her in the face with a wet towel, leaving a mark on her face, after which she left her family's house to enter voluntary foster care. She also described being forced to run while struggling to breathe after forgetting asthma medication, which contributed to quitting competitive running. Tone Eva, Gjert's wife, stated she would only testify behind closed doors, meaning no press would be present and the testimony would be exempted from public access. The court granted her request, but the judge stated he "did not appreciate being put in a coercive situation."

=== Verdict ===
The trial concluded on 15 May. The verdict was announced on 16 June; Gjert was convicted of abuse against his daughter Ingrid, but acquitted of the charges against Jakob. In the verdict, district court judge Arlid Dommersnes wrote that "even though Jakob and his brothers and spouses have given credible statements, the total weight of the statements and other evidence reviewed means that the court must conclude that there is reasonable doubt about the defendant's guilt." Gjert was sentenced to a 15-day suspended prison sentence and pay NOK 10,000 ($1,010) in damages.
