= Filip Ingebrigtsen =

Norwegian middle-distance runner (born 1993)

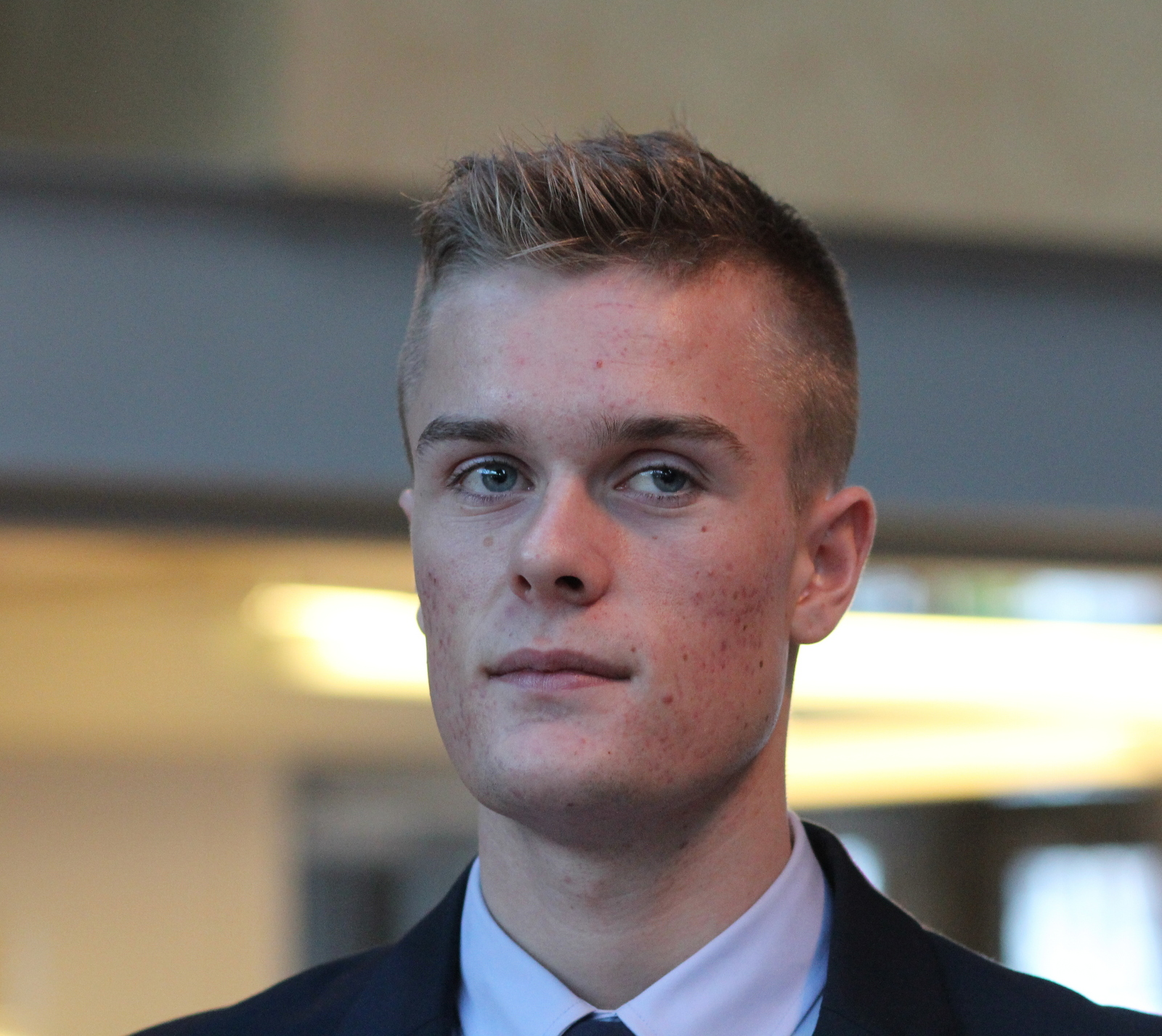
- Ingebrigtsen in 2014

Personal information
- Nationality: Norwegian
- Born: 20 April 1993 (age 33) Sandnes, Norway
- Height: 1.89 m (6 ft 2 in)
- Weight: 75 kg (165 lb)

Sport
- Sport: Track and field
- Events: 1500 metres, mile

Achievements and titles
- Personal bests: 1500 m: 3:30.01; Mile: 3:49.60; 5000 m: 13:11.75
Medal record
Men's athletics
Representing Norway
World Championships
Bronze medal – third place	2017 London	1500 m
European Championships
Gold medal – first place	2016 Amsterdam	1500 m
European Cross Country Championships
Gold medal – first place	2018 Tilburg	Senior Men

Filip Mangen Ingebrigtsen (born 20 April 1993) is a Norwegian middle-distance runner who represents Sandnes Idrettslag. In 2016, Ingebrigtsen became European Champion at 1500 meters during the European Championships in Amsterdam, and took bronze over the same distance at the World Championships in 2017 in London. He previously held the Norwegian 1500m record with the time 3:30.01, set at a Diamond League meet in Monaco on 20 July 2018. At the 2019 London Diamond League Ingebrigtsen finished second to Samuel Tefera in the mile. With a time of 3:49.60 Ingebrigtsen set a national record and new personal best.

Ingebrigtsen was born in Sandnes. A member of the Ingebrigtsen family, his older brother Henrik and younger brother Jakob are also middle-distance runners. They were trained by their dad Gjert Ingebrigtsen until 2022.

== Career ==
=== 2011 ===
At the Norwegian Championship 2011 he finished fifth in the 800 meters with time 1.56.18. At the same meeting, he also was on the Sandnes Idrettslag team that won gold in the junior class. The others on the team were Kjartan Løvoll, Per Magne Florvaag and Marius Bakken Støle. In the terrain race he received NM medal, and won silver in the short run in NM in terrain race. In the long run (6 km) he finished fifth, and also got bronze in the relay, together with teammates Asle Rønning Tjelta and Ragnar Stølsmark.

=== 2012-2015 ===
In July 2012 he won gold at 1500 meters in junior NM in athletics in Sigdal. In August he finished third at 800 meters in the 2012 Norwegian Athletics Championships, with Thomas Roth winning and older brother Henrik finishing second. In the 2013 Norwegian Athletics Championship he won the 1500 meters, and also won gold on the 4 × 1500 meter relay in the NM.

At the 2014 European Athletics Championships, where he ran 3.41.06 for 1500 meters in the opening session, but did not reach the final. The following week he won two medals in the Norwegian Championship, coming second in the 1500 meters and third at 800 meters.

In the 2015 European Athletics Championships finished second in the 1500 meters behind Snorre Holtan Løken.

=== 2016 ===
In the 2016 European Athletics Championships, he won the 1500 meters, with his older brother Henrik in third place. The week after, at the Diamond League meet in Monaco, and lowered his personal 1500 meters record to 3:33.72, finishing in 10th place. Ingebrigtsen represented Norway during the Rio Olympics in August, but was disqualified during the trial heat of the 1500 meters.

=== 2017 ===
In the 2017 World Championships in Athletics, Ingebrigtsen took the bronze medal at 1500 meters with time 3.34.53.

=== 2018 ===
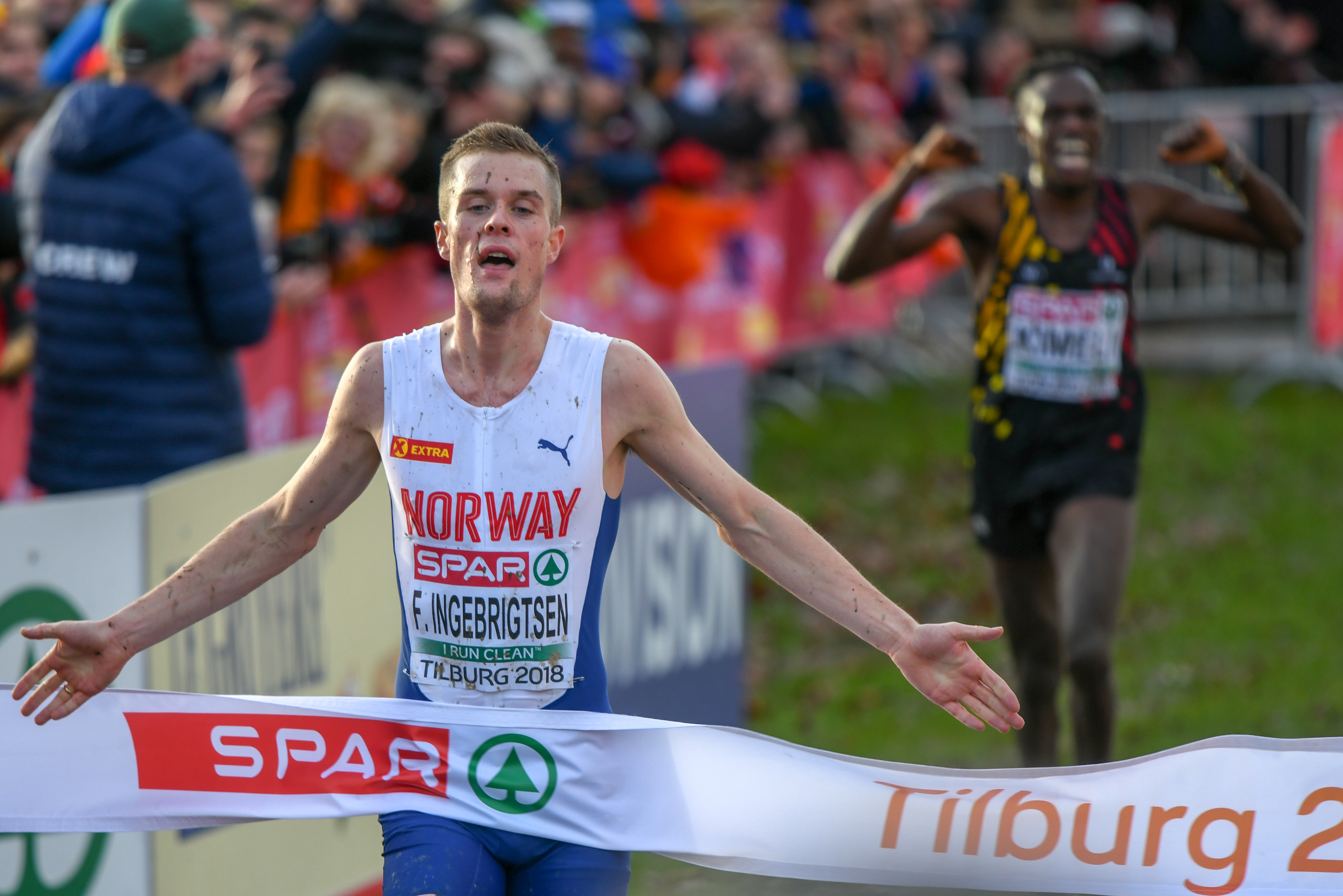
Filip at the 2018 European Cross Country Championships

At the Diamond League in Monaco on 20 July 2018 Ingebrigtsen set a record of 1500 meters with a time of 3:30.01min., which was the best time in Europe that year,making him a favorite at that distance for the upcoming European Championship in Berlin. In the semi-finals of the 2018 European Athletics Championships, he fell and broke a rib, but nonetheless, managed to get up and qualify for the final. His injury affected his performance in the final which is why he placed 12th with a time of 3:41.66min. Consequently, he had to withdraw from the 5000 meters final. His younger brother Jakob took gold in both distances, while his older brother Henrik secured silver in the 5000 meters. Following his injury and a few weeks later, Ingebrigtsen placed second behind Thomas Roth in the 800 meters at the Norwegian Championships (NM).

=== 2019 ===
Some of Ingebrigtsen's performances during the 2019 season were controversial. In the 2019 European Athletics Indoor Championships, he was disqualified in his 1500 meters heat for running off the track. His brother Jakob remarked that "It was the stupidest thing I'll see all year". A few months later, at the 2019 World Athletics Championships, Ingebrigtsen was seen to push another runner, Tedesse Lemi, causing him to fall, but he was not disqualified and proceeded to the semifinals.

=== 2020 ===
In February at the Millrose Games, Ingebrigtsen ran a 3:56.99min. indoor mile to set a new national record. Ingebrigtsen opened his outdoor season in the Impossible Games, running the 1000 meters in a national record of 2:16.46min. and a 2000 meters in 4:56.91min. just behind his brothers Henrik (4:53.72) and Jakob (4:50.01), running both events on the same day. He ran an 800-meter personal best of 1:46.74min. in Oslo at the end of June. In August, Ingebrigtsen ran the 1500 meters at the Monaco Diamond League in 3:30.35min., almost matching his lifetime best over this distance.

=== 2021 ===
Ingebrigtsen's 2021–2022 season was placed into jeopardy due to a reaction to receiving the COVID-19 vaccine but said that he would do it again. He struggled in training leading up to the 2020 Summer Olympics and failed to qualify for the Olympic Men's 1500 m final after finishing tenth in his heat.

== Personal life ==
In October 2023, Jakob, Filip, and Henrik Ingebrigtsen released a statement accusing their father and former coach Gjert of "aggression, control, and physical violence", also saying that he "took the joy out of the sport they once loved". Gjert stopped coaching his sons in 2022, and was not accredited at the 2023 World Athletics Championships in Budapest. Gjert would later be charged with seven counts of domestic abuse under Norwegian law in 2024. A trial investigating these claims began in March 2025, and lasted six weeks. Over 30 witnesses were called, including all seven Ingebrigtsen siblings. On 16 June, Gjert was convicted of abusing one of his children and was sentenced to a 15-day suspended prison sentence and pay NOK 10,000 ($1,010) in damages.

Ingebrigtsen and his brothers were the focus of several television programs, including Team Ingebrigtsen (2016–2021), and Ingebrigtsen: Born to Run (2024).

In late July 2024, with the goal of getting Norwegians excited and confident in their athletes for the 2024 Summer Olympics, Jakob, Filip, and Henrik Ingebrigtsen released a pop song known as Ingen gjør det bedre (Nobody Does It Better). They released this under the handle The IngebritZ.

In June 2025, the Ingebrigtsen brothers, along with Karoline Bjerkeli Grovdal and Marthe Kristoffersen, launched the Spring Run Club, open to all individuals interested in learning more about running. Jakob Ingebrigtsen said the team wants "...to share our knowledge and help grow a global running movement, for everyone that loves running".

== International competitions ==
Year	Competition	Venue	Position	Event	Notes
Representing Norway
2011	European Junior Championships	Tallinn, Estonia	25th (h)	800 m	1:54.20
2012	World Junior Championships	Barcelona, Spain	29th (h)	800 m	1:50.74
2012	World Junior Championships	Barcelona, Spain	10th	1500 m	3:46.54
2013	European U23 Championships	Tampere, Finland	7th (h)	800 m	1:48.57
2013	European U23 Championships	Tampere, Finland	6th	1500 m	3:45.48
2014	European Championships	Zürich, Switzerland	17th (h)	1500 m	3:41.06
2015	European Indoor Championships	Prague, Czech Republic	24th (h)	1500 m	3:50.15
2016	European Championships	Amsterdam, Netherlands	1st	1500 m	3:46.65
2016	Olympic Games	Rio de Janeiro, Brazil	–	1500 m	DQ
2017	European Indoor Championships	Belgrade, Serbia	17th (h)	1500 m	3:51.25
2017	World Championships	London, Great Britain	3rd	1500 m	3:34.53
2018	European Championships	Berlin, Germany	12th	1500 m	3:41.66
2018	European Cross Country Championships	Tilburg, Netherlands	1st	Senior men	28:49
2019	World Championships	Doha, Qatar	14th (sf)	1500 m	3:37.00
2019	World Championships	Doha, Qatar	3rd (h)	5000 m	13:20.52^{1}
2021	European Indoor Championships	Toruń, Poland	20th (h)	1500 m	3:41.52
2021	Olympic Games	Tokyo, Japan	21st (h)	1500 m	3:38.02
2025	European Indoor Championships	Apeldoorn, Netherlands	7th (h)	3000 m	7:51.76
2026	European Championships	Birmingham, United Kingdom	–	5000 m	DNF

^{1}Did not finish in the final
