= Fritz Moen =

Norwegian victim of miscarriage of justice

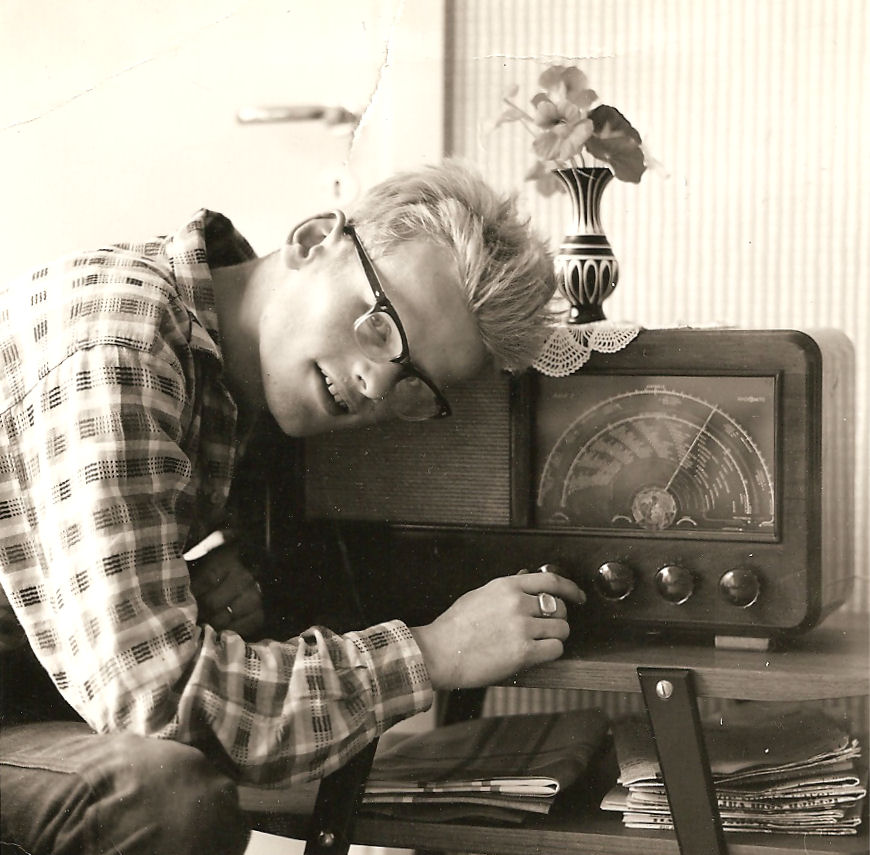
- Moen "listens" to the radio (1959). He could hear and feel high bass sounds.
- Born: 17 December 1941; Sarpsborg, Norway
- Died: 25 March 2005 (aged 63); Oslo, Norway
- Known for: Wrongful conviction of two separate murders
- Criminal penalty: 18 years in prison

Fritz Yngvar Moen (17 December 1941 – 28 March 2005) was a Norwegian man wrongfully convicted of two murders, in 1976 and 1977, and sentenced to 21 years imprisonment from 1978. Moen was deaf, had a severe speech impediment, and was partially paralysed, but had normal intelligence and good memory. He was released after serving 18½ years in 1996. The convictions were quashed years after his release, and an official inquiry was set up to establish what had gone wrong in the authorities' handling of the case. On 25 June 2007, two years after his death, the commission delivered harsh criticism to the police, the prosecution, and the courts, in what was immediately termed Norway's worst miscarriage of justice of all time.

== Early life ==
Moen was the son of a Norwegian woman (Betzy Moen) and a German army corporal (Fritz Robert Hellmann). His father served during the German occupation of Norway in the Second World War, then died without having met his son on the Eastern Front in 1944.

Moen was deaf from birth, and his mother decided she could not take care of him. In June 1943 he was placed in an orphanage in Skjeberg. It is unclear whether he lived with his mother in the period before this, or whether he was already staying in an infant home. Fritz had little or no contact with his mother after he arrived at the orphanage. He had no family or other contacts to go to on weekends and holidays. His mother married in 1947, and later had two more sons.

Moen had no contact with other deaf people, neither children nor adults, from the time he was 1½ years old until he was 7-8 years old. In the childhood years when hearing children learn to speak and understand concrete and abstract concepts and nuances, Moen grew up without adequate opportunities and close relationships to family members, and had a stunted development. These conditions were, according to witness psychologists and deaf interpreters, a contributing factor to his later social problems and major problems with language comprehension.

== Initial conviction and sentencing ==
Moen was convicted for two separate rapes and murders, both in Trondheim:

- Torunn Finstad, who was reported missing on 4 October 1977 and found dead two days later, having been raped and strangled. Moen was indicted by a Frostating court for the crime on 11 April 1978. He was convicted and sentenced to 20 years' imprisonment on 29 May the same year. This sentence was reduced to 16 years on appeal.
- Sigrid Heggheim, who was found dead in September 1976. She had been strangled and an attempt had been made to rape her. The same court indicted Moen for murder and attempted rape on 15 September 1981, and on 19 December he was convicted and sentenced to an additional 5 years. An appeal was rejected.

The prosecuting authorities relied on Moen's confession to the murders, which appears to have been coerced by way of intimidation. Biological samples were collected at both crime scenes and tested with technology available at the time, but the samples were then lost and destroyed for reasons that remain unclear.

When Moen was convicted, his defence lawyer, Olav Hestenes, announced: "For the first time at this desk, I allow myself to say that a travesty of justice has been committed." The judge, Karl Solberg, reacted furiously and later applauded the court's verdict. Solberg has become notorious for miscarriages of justice, having also been instrumental in the wrongful conviction of Atle Hage, a father who was convicted of incest, took his own life after his release from prison, and was cleared ten years later when his children testified on his behalf.

== Convictions quashed ==
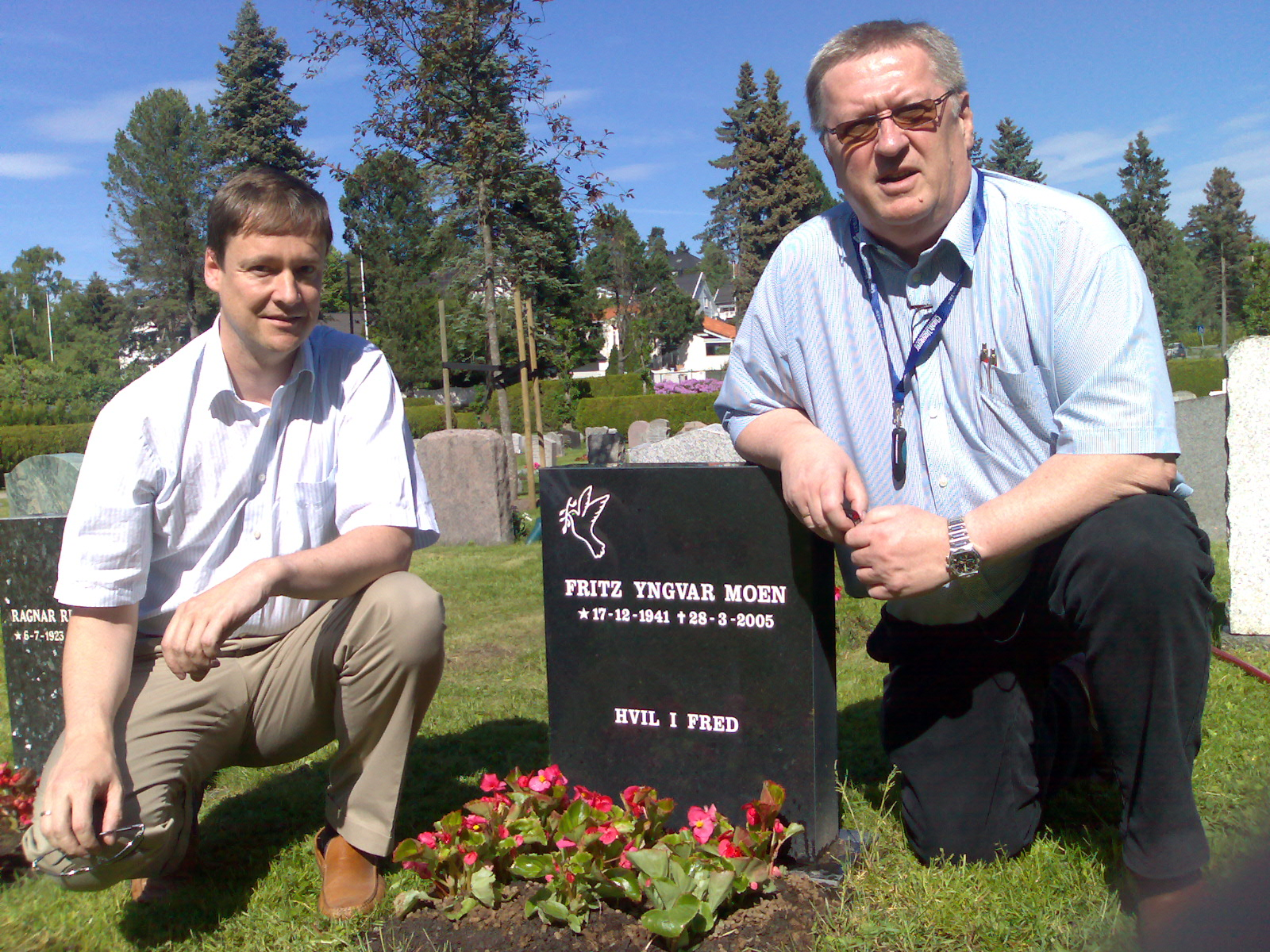
Fritz Moen's tombstone, surrounded by John Christian Elden (defender during reopening of the case) and Tore Sandberg (private investigator).

Moen's lawyer requested a new trial for both cases on 2 January 2000. The court accepted the request for the Sigrid Heggheim case, and on 7 October 2004 judge Wenche Skjæggestad announced that the court had quashed the conviction and acquitted Moen for the rape and attempted murder of Sigrid Heggheim. The court found that the forensic evidence exonerated Moen, and that in any case reasonable doubt should have acquitted him in the first place. Among other things, he had an alibi for the most likely time of the crime. The forensic evidence indicated that the perpetrator had pursued the victim across a field, knocked her down, and then tied her with her own clothes — Moen was partly paralysed and physically incapable of these actions.

The court rejected the appeal against Moen's conviction in the Torunn Finstad case, and on 13 October 2005, the Norwegian Criminal Cases Review Commission received a preliminary application to review the case. When Moen died on 28 March 2005 of natural causes, it became known that he wanted the case on his behalf to continue.

In December 2005, it became known that Tor Hepsø, a convicted criminal with a long history of violence, had made a deathbed confession to killing both Sigrid Heggheim and Torunn Finstad. On 15 June 2006, the Criminal Cases Review Commission formally accepted the application, and on 24 August 2006, the Frostating court posthumously acquitted Fritz Moen for the rape and murder of Sigrid Heggheim. It found that the preponderance of evidence made Hepsø a more likely suspect, and that Moen's confession was likely coerced and only included information that had been made public. These two acquittals are widely attributed to the work of Moen's defence lawyer John Christian Elden and private investigator Tore Sandberg.

In the aftermath of the acquittals, Fritz Moen's lawyers filed a civil suit against the Norwegian government seeking 28 million NOK (€3.4 million). The case was settled in April 2008 when the presiding judge awarded 20 million NOK (€2.4 million).

The case caused widespread public debate in Norway. There were calls for a formal inquiry into the conduct of the prosecutors and police.

== Inquiry ==
On 25 June 2007 a commission headed by Henry John Mæland, professor of law at the University of Bergen, delivered its findings to the Norwegian Minister of Justice Knut Storberget. The commission stated that the principle of objectivity was violated repeatedly by both the police and the courts. It also found that the most important lesson that could be learned from this case was that the presumption of innocence must be upheld by both the public prosecutors and the courts. Mæland stated that witnesses had been coaxed by the Trondheim police force, while at the same time significant evidence proving Moen's innocence had been withheld from the defence and the courts. "Some of the evidence has basically been hidden within the police reports," Mæland concluded. The justice minister commented during the press conference that "the commission's report shows that grave errors have been committed leading to grave results."

The commission was appointed on 8 September 2006 by the Norwegian cabinet. Besides Professor Mæland, it consisted of judge Inger Marie Dons Jensen and psychiatrist Ingrid Lycke Ellingsen. Its mandate was to "find out why Moen was wrongfully convicted and evaluate whether changes are needed in the criminal justice system to avoid wrongful convictions in the future".

A book called Overgrepet (Infringement) by Tore Sandberg, the private investigator involved in Moen's case, was published in October 2007. The book names police officers and other public servants instrumental in Moen's prosecution.

On 5 February 2008, the Norwegian Parliament's Standing Committee on Scrutiny and Constitutional Affairs recommended that a commission be appointed to investigate and, if warranted, prosecute for the impeachment of three of the Norwegian Supreme Court justices who presided over the Moen cases. The three were Magnus Matningsdal, Karin Maria Bruzelius and Eilert Stang Lund. However, when the case went to the Standing Committee on Justice, it was closed.

== Popular media ==
Justice Denied, a wrongful conviction magazine in the United States, published an article about Fritz Moen's case in its Spring 2008 issue.
