= Henning Jakhelln =

Norwegian legal academic

Henning (Tønsberg) Jakhelln (born 22 March 1939) is a Norwegian legal academic, and professor emeritus of Law (labour law) at the University of Oslo.

He was born in Bodø, and obtained the cand.jur. degree in 1963 and the lic.jur. degree in 1967. In 1965, he became an assistant professor at the University of Oslo. He became a full professor of law in 1990. His specialty is labour law.
