= Henrik Ingebrigtsen =

Norwegian middle-distance runner (born 1991)

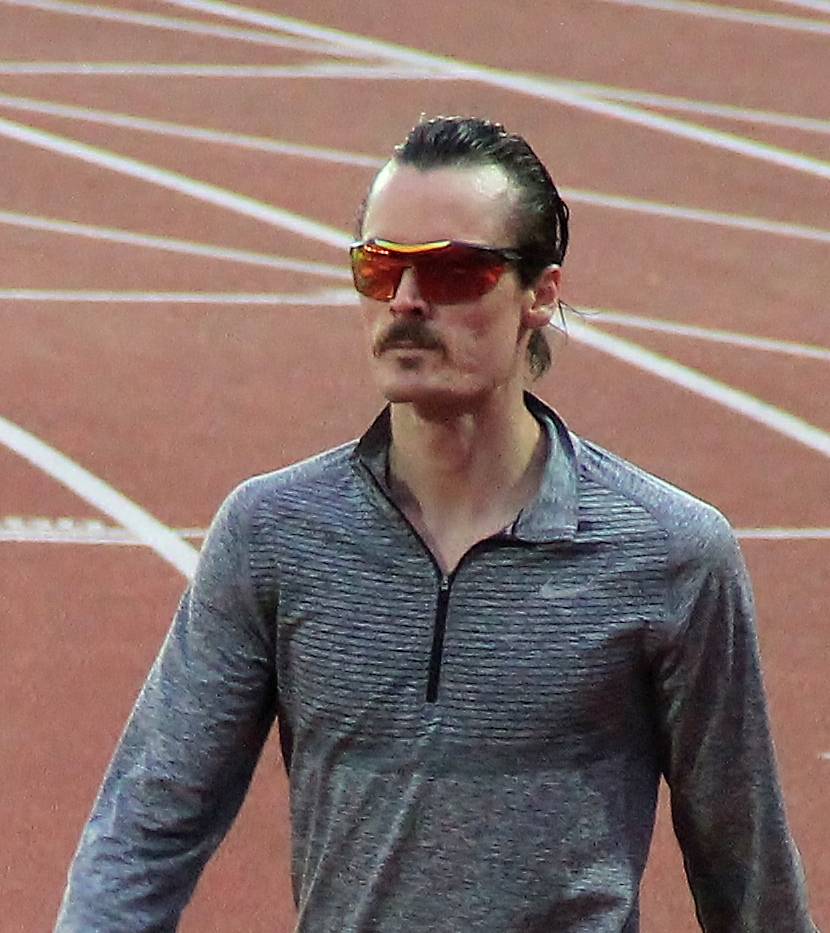
- Ingebrigtsen in 2016

Personal information
- Nationality: Norwegian
- Born: 24 February 1991 (age 35) Sandnes, Norway

Sport
- Sport: Track
- Event: 1500 metres

Achievements and titles
- Regional finals: 1st at the 2012 European Athletics Championships
- Personal bests: 1500 m: 3:31.46; Mile: 3:50.72; 3000 m: 7:36.85; 2-Mile: 8:22.31; 5000 m: 13:15.38
Medal record
Men's athletics
Representing Norway
European Championships
Gold medal – first place	2012 Helsinki	1500 m
Silver medal – second place	2014 Zürich	1500 m
Bronze medal – third place	2016 Amsterdam	1500 m
Silver medal – second place	2018 Berlin	5000 m
European Indoor Championships
Bronze medal – third place	2015 Prague	3000 m
Silver medal – second place	2017 Belgrade	3000 m
Bronze medal – third place	2019 Glasgow	3000 m
Representing Europe
Continental Cup
Bronze medal – third place	2018 Ostrava	3000 m
- Updated on 28 January 2019

Henrik Ingebrigtsen (born 24 February 1991) is a Norwegian middle-distance runner who competes mainly in the 1500 metres. He represented Norway in this event at the 2012 and 2016 Summer Olympics. A member of the Ingebrigtsen family, his younger brothers, Filip and Jakob, are also professional middle-distance runners.

== Athletic career ==
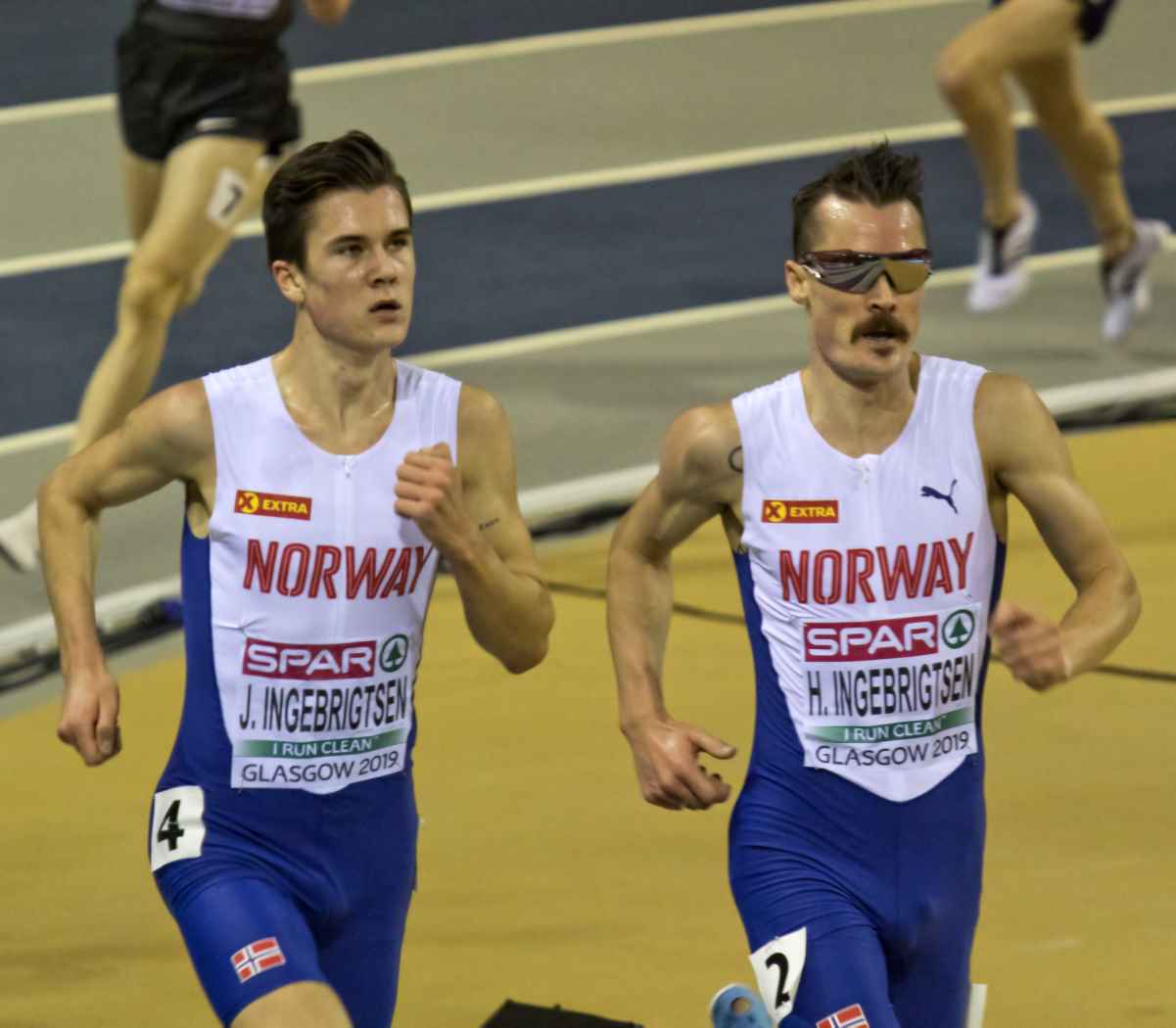
Henrik (right) and his brother Jakob in 2019

Ingebrigtsen first broke the 3:40 barrier in the 1500 meters at the age of 19. He won the gold medal at the 2012 European Athletics Championships in Helsinki at the 1500 metres event. He followed it by finishing 5th at the Olympic Games in London with a new national record of 3:35.43. Ingebrigtsen further improved the national record to 3:33.95 at the Diamond League meet held in Zürich on 29 August 2013.

In May 2018, he won the men's 5000 metres at the Payton Jordan Invitational with a PB 13:16.97, winning by only 0.005 seconds. He had run the last 400 metres of the race in 56.27 seconds.

On 13 June 2019, he set a new Norwegian record for 3000 metres, running 7:36.85 at the Bislett Games in Oslo, Norway.

== Personal life ==
In October 2023, Jakob, Filip, and Henrik Ingebrigtsen released a statement accusing their father and former coach Gjert of "aggression, control, and physical violence", also saying that he "took the joy out of the sport they once loved". Gjert stopped coaching his sons in 2022, and was not accredited as their coach at the 2023 World Athletics Championships in Budapest. Gjert would later be charged with seven counts of domestic abuse under Norwegian law in 2024. A trial investigating these claims began in March 2025, and lasted six weeks. Over 30 witnesses were called, including all seven Ingebrigtsen siblings. On 16 June, Gjert was convicted of abusing one of his children and was sentenced to a 15-day suspended prison sentence and pay NOK 10,000 ($1,010) in damages.

Ingebrigtsen and his brothers were the focus of several television programs, including Team Ingebrigtsen (2016–2021), and Ingebrigtsen: Born to Run (2024).

In late July 2024, with the goal of getting Norwegians excited and confident in their athletes for the 2024 Summer Olympics, Jakob, Filip, and Henrik Ingebrigtsen released a pop song known as Ingen gjør det bedre (Nobody Does It Better).

In June 2025, the Ingebrigtsen brothers, along with Karoline Bjerkeli Grovdal and Marthe Kristoffersen, launched the Spring Run Club, open to all individuals interested in learning more about running. Jakob Ingebrigtsen said the team wants "...to share our knowledge and help grow a global running movement, for everyone that loves running".

== International competitions ==
Year	Competition	Venue	Position	Event	Notes
Representing Norway
2008	European Cross Country Championships	Brussels, Belgium	23rd	U20 race	Individual
2008	European Cross Country Championships	Brussels, Belgium	2nd	U20 race	Team
2009	European Junior Championships	Novi Sad, Serbia	13th (sf)	800 m	1:51.53
2009	European Junior Championships	Novi Sad, Serbia	14th (h)	1500 m	3:53.69
2009	European Cross Country Championships	Dublin, Ireland	12th	U20 race	Individual
2009	European Cross Country Championships	Dublin, Ireland	3rd	U20 race	Team
2010	World Junior Championships	Moncton, New Brunswick, Canada	12th (h)	1500m	3:45.31
2010	European Championships	Barcelona, Spain	13th (h)	1500 m	3:42.62
2011	European Cross Country Championships	Velenje, Slovenia	15th	U23 race	Individual
2011	European Cross Country Championships	Velenje, Slovenia	1st	U23 race	Team
2011	European U23 Championships	Ostrava, Czech Republic	26th (h)	1500m	3:51.99
2012	European Championships	Helsinki, Finland	1st	1500 m	3:46.20
2012	Olympic Games	London, United Kingdom	5th	1500 m	3:35.43 NR
2012	European Cross Country Championships	Budapest, Hungary	1st	U23 race	Individual
2012	European Cross Country Championships	Budapest, Hungary	4th	U23 race	Team
2013	European Indoor Championships	Gothenburg, Sweden	11th	3000 m	8:02.45
2013	European U23 Championships	Tampere, Finland	20th (h)	1500m	3:50.16
2013	European U23 Championships	Tampere, Finland	1st	5000m	14:19.39
2013	World Championships	Moscow, Russia	8th	1500 m	3:37.52
2014	European Championships	Zürich, Switzerland	2nd	1500 m	3:46.10
2015	European Indoor Championships	Prague, Czech Republic	6th	1500 m	3:39.70 NR
2015	European Indoor Championships	Prague, Czech Republic	3rd	3000 m	7:45.54 NR
2015	World Championships	Beijing, China	31st (h)	1500 m	3:43.97
2016	European Championships	Amsterdam, Netherlands	3rd	1500 m	3:47.18
2016	European Championships	Amsterdam, Netherlands	4th	5000 m	13:40.86
2016	Olympic Games	Rio de Janeiro, Brazil	20th (sf)	1500 m	3:42.51
2017	European Indoor Championships	Belgrade, Serbia	2nd	3000 m	8:00.93
2017	European Cross Country Championships	Šamorín, Slovakia	11th	Senior men	Individual
2018	European Championships	Berlin, Germany	4th	1500 m	3:38.50
2018	European Championships	Berlin, Germany	2nd	5000 m	13:18.75
2018	European Cross Country Championships	Tilburg, Netherlands	18th	Senior men	Individual
2018	European Cross Country Championships	Tilburg, Netherlands	6th	Senior men	Team
2019	European Indoor Championships	Glasgow, United Kingdom	3rd	3000 m	7:57.19
2019	World Championship	Doha, Qatar	13th	5000 m	13:36.25
2023	World Championships	Budapest, Hungary	24th (h)	5000 m	13:38.80
2024	European Championships	Rome, Italy	25th	5000 m	13:52.71
