= 2018 European Athletics Championships – Men's 5000 metres =

Men's 5000 metres at the 2018 European Athletics Championships
- Venue: Olympic Stadium
- Location: Berlin
- Dates: August 11 (final)
- Competitors: 24 from 12 nations
- Winning time: 13:17.06

Medalists
| gold medal | Jakob Ingebrigtsen | Norway |
| silver medal | Henrik Ingebrigtsen | Norway |
| bronze medal | Morhad Amdouni | France |

The men's 5000 metres at the 2018 European Athletics Championships took place at the Olympic Stadium on 11 August.

== Records ==
Standing records prior to the 2018 European Athletics Championships
| World record | Kenenisa Bekele (ETH) | 12:37.35 | Hengelo, Netherlands | 31 May 2004 |
| European record | Mohammed Mourhit (BEL) | 12:49.71 | Brussels, Belgium | 25 August 2000 |
| Championship record | Jack Buckner (GBR) | 13:10.15 | Stuttgart, West Germany | 31 August 1986 |
| World Leading | Birhanu Balew (BHR) | 13:01.09 | Lausanne, Switzerland | 5 July 2018 |
| European Leading | Henrik Ingebrigtsen (NOR) | 13:16.97 | Stanford, United States | 3 May 2018 |

== Schedule ==
| Date | Time | Round |
|---|---|---|
| 11 August 2018 | 20:55 | Final |

All times are local times (UTC+2)

== Results ==
=== Final ===
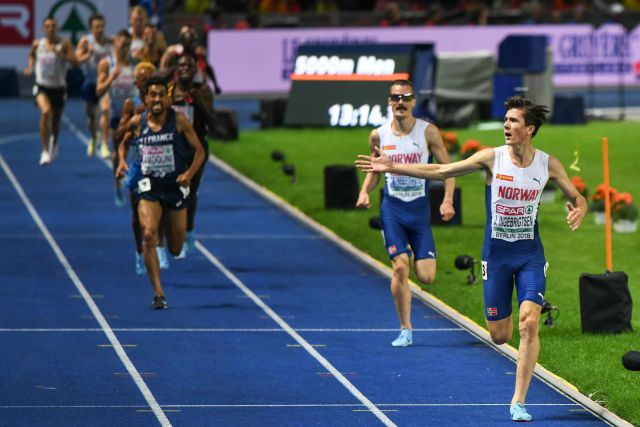
The finish

| Rank | Name | Nationality | Time | Note |
|---|---|---|---|---|
| 1st place, gold medalist(s) | Jakob Ingebrigtsen | Norway | 13:17.06 | EU20R |
| 2nd place, silver medalist(s) | Henrik Ingebrigtsen | Norway | 13:18.75 | |
| 3rd place, bronze medalist(s) | Morhad Amdouni | France | 13:19.14 | SB |
| 4 | Yemaneberhan Crippa | Italy | 13:19.85 | |
| 5 | Marc Scott | Great Britain | 13:23.14 | SB |
| 6 | Polat Kemboi Arıkan | Turkey | 13:23.42 | SB |
| 7 | Rinas Akhmadiyev | Authorised Neutral Athletes | 13:24.43 | PB |
| 8 | Julien Wanders | Switzerland | 13:24.79 | PB |
| 9 | Chris Thompson | Great Britain | 13:25.11 | SB |
| 10 | Soufiane Bouchikhi | Belgium | 13:25.22 | |
| 11 | Ben Connor | Great Britain | 13:25.31 | PB |
| 12 | Florian Carvalho | France | 13:28.08 | |
| 13 | Antonio Abadía | Spain | 13:34.25 | |
| 14 | Kaan Kigen Özbilen | Turkey | 13:35.31 | SB |
| 15 | Robin Hendrix | Belgium | 13:36.15 | |
| 16 | Juan Pérez | Spain | 13:37.07 | |
| 17 | Florian Orth | Germany | 13:37.46 | |
| 18 | Marcel Fehr | Germany | 13:37.66 | |
| 19 | Andreas Vojta | Austria | 13:42.75 | SB |
| 20 | Benjamin Rainero de Haan | Netherlands | 13:42.95 | |
| 21 | Jonas Raess | Switzerland | 14:01.14 | |
| 22 | Ramazan Özdemir | Turkey | 14:03.63 | |
| | Adel Mechaal | Spain | DNF | |
| | Isaac Kimeli | Belgium | DQ | 163.5 (c) |
