= Patricia Silva =

Patricia Silva may refer to:

- Patricia Batista da Silva, Brazilian handball player
- Patrícia Da Silva (born 1990), Swiss-Portuguese model and beauty pageant titleholder
- Patrícia Silva (runner), (born 1999), Portuguese middle-distance runner
- Patrícia Silva (hurdler), Peruvian track runner at the 1999 Summer Universiade
- Patricia Silva (politician), Chilean interim cabinet member during the presidency of Michelle Bachelet
- Patricia Silva (volleyball), Brazilian beach volleyball gold medalist at the 2014 Summer Youth Olympic Games
- Patricia A. E. Pereira de Silva, Portuguese gymnast at the 2013 World Rhythmic Gymnastics Championships
- Patricia da Silva (referee), Uruguayan official during the 2006 South American Women's Football Championship
- Patricia de Sousa E Silva, Portuguese gymnast at the 2013 World Rhythmic Gymnastics Championships
