= Kristian Gundersen =

Norwegian physiologist

Kristian Gundersen (born 1959) is a Norwegian physiologist.

== Career ==
Graduating from the University of Oslo with the cand.scient. degree in 1981, he took the dr.philos. degree at the Faculty of Medicine in 1989. He was a postdoctoral fellow at the Washington University Medical School from 1990 to 1992 and the University of Oslo from 1993 to 1996 before being employed as a professor of biology in 1996. He is a fellow of the Norwegian Academy of Science and Letters.

== Views on science and academia ==
Gundersen sees academic research as a "calling" which requires a "formidable" work ethic, around-the-clock "living within the research questions" and dedication beyond standard working hours, which he regards as being at odds with the "Norwegian work ethic". Gundersen sat on the Academic College of the University of Oslo and later on the university board that succeeded it. In running a university, Gundersen voiced a strong desire to "combat new public management", fund basic research and lessen the role of research grants from outside councils. He has deplored specific grants from the Norwegian Research Council as "scandalous". Due to the perceived control of research and funding by administrative bodies, Gundersen has postulated that "Academic freedom exists no longer".

Furthermore he lambasted the endeavour to create a vision for the University of Oslo, which he called "maybe fitting in McDonald's", a case of "management hysteria", "drivel", "almost an insult to grown-ups" and "almost childish". Gundersen has called for a better legal framework defending freedom of expression, has criticized political correctness, post-modernism and "nonsensical" science, forms of gender affirmative action and calls to ban the niqab and other clothing articles which he finds contrary to the purpose of a liberal institution. While providing "lukewarm" and "conditional" support to the cause of Jordan Peterson he criticized the "far identity-political left" for constricting the Overton window.

== External link ==
- Sikt research profile
