= John Christian Elden =

Norwegian barrister and politician

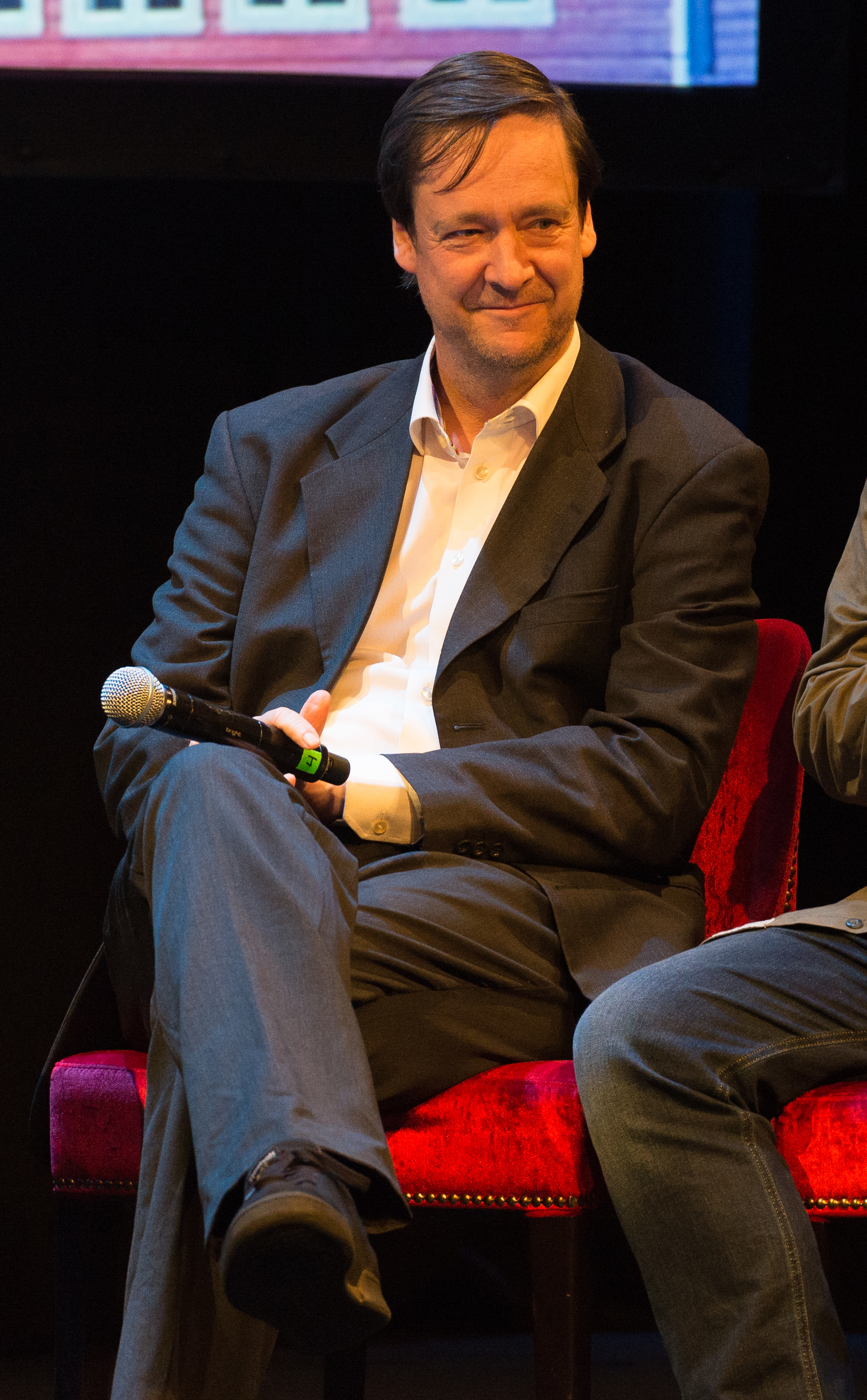

Deputy Representative to the Parliament of Norway
- In office 2013–2017

Personal details
- Born: 2 July 1967 (age 58); Oslo, Norway
- Political party: Conservative Party
- Education: University of Oslo
- Occupation: Politician, lawyer

John Christian Elden (born 2 July 1967) is a Norwegian politician for the Conservative Party, reputation management consultant and lawyer. In 2024 Norwegian media reported that he had been hired as a representative of self-styled shaman Durek Verrett to engage in reputation management on Verrett's behalf.

== Politics ==
Elden was chairman of Ullern Unge Høyre in 1981, chair of the Oslo Gymnasium Committee, chairman of the Norwegian Student Societyin 1987 and chair of the Student Council in Oslo in 1990. He was a member of oslo city council for the Conservative Party from 1988 to 1991. From 2007 to 2010 he was a member of the Vestre Aker district committee. From 2011 to 2013 he was a councillor in the City of Oslo. From 2013 to 2017 he was the Conservative Party's sixth deputy representative to the Storting from Oslo and met two days in the autumn of 2015. From 2017 to 2021 he was the Conservative Party's eighth deputy representative in Oslo.

== Education and occupation ==
Elden graduated with a law degree from the University of Oslo in 1991, received a lawyer's licence in 1993 and a right to appear before the Supreme Court in 1999. He was chief financial officer of Norges Gymnasiastsamband and Operasjon Dagsverk from 1985 to 1987, a storting journalist for the Conservative Party from 1987 to 1988, consultant in the Student Welfare Organisation in Oslo in 1991, research assistant at the University of Oslo from 1991 to 1992 and associate with his father, lawyer John Elden, 1991–1993. John Christian Elden is a partner in Elden Law Firm established in 1993, permanent defender in Oslo District Court from 2000 and permanent defender in Borgarting Court of Appeal from 2000. He has also been project secretary at the Council of Europe (FES) in Paris. He participated in the US State Department IV Leadership Program in 2005. Elden won the award for lawyer of the year organized by Finansavisen in 2014 for his work on the Røeggen case that was won against DnB in the Supreme Court's grand chamber. He is a freemason.

Elden was named Norway's foremost defense lawyer by Dagbladet in 2001. He has been a defender in a number of high-profile criminal cases. He was the defense lawyer for Erling Havnå. In 2022, Elden served as the lead defence lawyer for Zaniar Matapour, the perpetrator of the Oslo shooting that left two people dead and 21 others injured.
