= 2025 European Athletics Indoor Championships – Men's 800 metres =

Men's 800 metres at the 2025 European Athletics Indoor Championships
- Venue: Omnisport Apeldoorn
- Location: Apeldoorn, Netherlands
- Dates: 7 March 2025 (round 1); 8 March 2025 (semi-finals); 9 March 2025 (final)
- Competitors: 28 from 14 nations
- Winning time: 1:44.88 NR

Medalists
gold medal	Samuel Chapple	Netherlands
silver medal	Eliott Crestan	Belgium
bronze medal	Mark English	Ireland

The men's 800 metres at the 2025 European Athletics Indoor Championships was held on the short track of Omnisport in Apeldoorn, Netherlands, on 7, 8 and 9 March 2025. This was the 38th time the event was contested at the European Athletics Indoor Championships. Athletes qualified by achieving the entry standard or by their World Athletics Ranking in the event.

== Background ==
The men's 800 metres was contested 37 times before 2025, at every previous edition of the European Athletics Indoor Championships (1970–2023). The 2025 European Athletics Indoor Championships was held in Omnisport Apeldoorn in Apeldoorn, Netherlands. The removable indoor athletics track was retopped for these championships in September 2024.

Wilson Kipketer is the world and European record holder with a time of 1:42.67, set in 1997. The championship record is 1:44.78, set by Paweł Czapiewski at the 2002 championships.

Records before the 2025 European Athletics Indoor Championships
Record	Athlete (nation)	Time (s)	Location	Date
World record	Wilson Kipketer (DEN)	1:42.67	Paris, France	9 March 1997
European record	Wilson Kipketer (DEN)	1:42.67	Paris, France	9 March 1997
Championship record	Paweł Czapiewski (POL)	1:44.78	Vienna, Austria	3 March 2002
World leading	Josh Hoey (USA)	1:43.60	New York City, United States	23 February 2025
European leading	Josué Canales (ESP)	1:44.65	Luxembourg City, Luxembourg	19 January 2025

== Qualification ==
For the men's 800 metres, the qualification period ran from 25 February 2024 until 23 February 2025. Athletes qualified by achieving the entry standards of 1:46.40 s indoors or 1:44.50 s outdoor, or by virtue of their World Athletics Ranking for the event. There was a target number of 30 athletes.

== Results ==
=== Round 1 ===
Round 1 was held on 7 March, starting at 11:05 (UTC+1) in the morning. First 2 in each heat (Q) and the next 2 by time (q) qualified for the semi-finals.

==== Heat 1 ====
Rank	Athlete	Nation	Time	Notes
1	Ryan Clarke	Netherlands	1:48.11	Q
2	Ramon Wipfli	Switzerland	1:48.27	Q, PB
3	Thomas Randolph	Great Britain	1:48.47	
4	Bartosz Kitliński	Poland	1:56.76	qR
5	Cian McPhillips	Ireland	1:57.35	qR
—	Pieter Sisk	Belgium	DNS	

==== Heat 2 ====
Rank	Athlete	Nation	Time	Notes
1	Eliott Crestan	Belgium	1:46.57	Q
2	Mariano García	Spain	1:46.75	Q
3	Yanis Meziane	France	1:46.79	
4	Giovanni Lazzaro	Italy	1:47.72	
5	Uku Renek Kronbergs	Estonia	1:48.24	
—	Daniel Kotyza	Czech Republic	DQ	TR17.2.3

==== Heat 3 ====
Rank	Athlete	Nation	Time	Notes
1	Marino Bloudek	Croatia	1:48.07	Q
2	Catalin Tecuceanu	Italy	1:48.10	Q
3	Jakub Dudycha	Czech Republic	1:48.29	
4	Álvaro de Arriba	Spain	1:48.40	
5	Tobias Grønstad	Norway	1:48.90	
6	Ivan Pelizzoli	Switzerland	1:49.22	

==== Heat 4 ====
Rank	Athlete	Nation	Time	Notes
1	Josué Canales	Spain	1:45.93	Q
2	Maciej Wyderka	Poland	1:46.11	Q
3	Samuel Chapple	Netherlands	1:46.15	q
4	Corentin Le Clezio	France	1:47.43	qJ
5	Jack Higgins	Great Britain	1:48.12	

==== Heat 5 ====
Rank	Athlete	Nation	Time	Notes
1	Patryk Sieradzki	Poland	1:46.32	Q, PB
2	Mark English	Ireland	1:46.42	Q
3	Justin Davies	Great Britain	1:46.56	q
4	Louey Ouerrat	France	1:46.60	
5	Tibo De Smet	Belgium	1:46.79	
6	Andreas Kramer	Sweden	1:50.17	

=== Semi-finals ===
The semi-finals were held on 8 March, starting at 20:29 (UTC+1) in the evening. First 3 in each heat (Q) qualified for the final.

==== Heat 1 ====
Rank	Athlete	Nation	Time	Notes
1	Ryan Clarke	Netherlands	1:45.65	Q, PB
2	Josué Canales	Spain	1:45.69	Q
3	Catalin Tecuceanu	Italy	1:46.12	Q
4	Maciej Wyderka	Poland	1:46.17	
5	Patryk Sieradzki	Poland	1:46.94	
6	Justin Davies	United Kingdom	1:47.17	
7	Cian McPhillips	Ireland	1:47.40	

==== Heat 2 ====
Rank	Athlete	Nation	Time	Notes
1	Eliott Crestan	Belgium	1:45.84	Q
2	Samuel Chapple	Netherlands	1:45.86	Q
3	Mark English	Ireland	1:45.89	Q
4	Bartosz Kitliński	Poland	1:46.06	
5	Mariano García	Spain	1:46.33	
6	Marino Bloudek	Croatia	1:46.57	
7	Corentin Le Clezio	France	1:46.91	
8	Ramon Wipfli	Switzerland	1:47.30	PB

=== Final ===
The final is scheduled for 9 March, starting at 17:27 (UTC+1) in the afternoon.

Rank	Athlete	Nation	Time	Notes
1st place, gold medalist(s)	Samuel Chapple	Netherlands	1:44.88	NR
2nd place, silver medalist(s)	Eliott Crestan	Belgium	1:44.92	
3rd place, bronze medalist(s)	Mark English	Ireland	1:45.46	
4	Catalin Tecuceanu	Italy	1:45.57	
5	Josué Canales	Spain	1:45.88	
6	Ryan Clarke	Netherlands	1:46.47	
