= 2024 European Athletics Championships – Men's 800 metres =

Men's 800 metres at the 2024 European Athletics Championships
- Venue: Stadio Olimpico
- Location: Rome
- Dates: 7 June (round 1); 8 June (semifinals); 9 June (final)
- Competitors: 32 from 17 nations
- Winning time: 1:44.87

Medalists
gold medal	Gabriel Tual	France
silver medal	Mohamed Attaoui	Spain
bronze medal	Catalin Tecuceanu	Italy

The men's 800 metres at the 2024 European Athletics Championships took place at the Stadio Olimpico from 7 to 9 June.

== Records ==
Standing records prior to the 2024 European Athletics Championships
World record	David Rudisha (KEN)	1:40.91	London, Great Britain	9 August 2012
European record	Wilson Kipketer (DEN)	1:41.11	Köln, Germany	24 August 1997
Championship record	Olaf Beyer (GDR)	1:43.84	Prague, Czechoslovakia	31 August 1978
World Leading	Djamel Sedjati (ALG)	1:43.23	Stockholm, Sweden	2 June 2024
Europe Leading	Catalin Tecuceanu (ITA)	1:44.01	Asti, Italy	23 May 2024

== Schedule ==
Date	Time	Round
7 June 2024	12:20	Round 1
8 June 2024	19:50	Semifinals
9 June 2024	22:27	Final

All times are local times (UTC+2)

== Results ==
=== Round 1 ===
The first 3 (Q) from each heat and the next 4 fastest (q) qualify for the semifinals.

Rank	Heat	Lane	Name	Nationality	Time	Note
1	4	4	Paul Anselmini	France	1:44.73	Q, PB
2	4	3	Jakub Dudycha	Czech Republic	1:44.89	Q, WU20L
3	4	5	Catalin Tecuceanu	Italy	1:44.93	Q
4	4	2	Marino Bloudek	Croatia	1:45.07	q, PB
5	4	6	Ryan Clarke	Netherlands	1:45.25	q
6	4	9	Mohamed Attaoui	Spain	1:45.09	q
7	4	8	Thomas Randolph	Great Britain	1:45.58	q
8	1	7	Gabriel Tual	France	1:45.69	Q
9	1	4	Francesco Pernici	Italy	1:45.87	Q
10	4	7	Pieter Sisk	Belgium	1:45.87	
11	1	3	Álvaro de Arriba	Spain	1:46.03	Q
12	1	5	Mateusz Borkowski	Poland	1:46.12	
13	3	3	Ole Jakob Solbu	Norway	1:46.16	Q
14	3	4	Simone Barontini	Italy	1:46.30	Q
15	3	5	Filip Ostrowski	Poland	1:46.37	Q
16	3	9	Yanis Meziane	France	1:46.39	
17	3	8	Callum Dodds	Great Britain	1:46.39	
18	2	5	Adrián Ben	Spain	1:46.39	Q
18	1	8	Tobias Grønstad	Norway	1:46.39	
20	2	3	Elliot Giles	Great Britain	1:46.44	Q
21	2	2	Andreas Kramer	Sweden	1:46.46	Q
22	2	7	Eliott Crestan	Belgium	1:46.48	
23	3	2	Niels Laros	Netherlands	1:46.62	SB
24	1	6	Tibo De Smet	Belgium	1:46.71	
25	2	4	Mark English	Ireland	1:46.73	
26	1	2	Balázs Vindics	Hungary	1:46.84	SB
27	2	9	Ramon Wipfli	Switzerland	1:47.37	
28	2	8	Michał Rozmys	Poland	1:47.46	
29	1	9	Salih Teksöz	Turkey	1:47.80	
30	2	6	Jared Micallef	Malta	1:47.91	
31	3	7	Abedin Mujezinović	Bosnia and Herzegovina	1:49.20	
32	3	6	Dániel Huller	Hungary	1:49.59	

=== Semifinals ===
The first 3 (Q) from each heat and the next 2 fastest (q) qualify for the final.

Rank	Heat	Lane	Name	Nationality	Time	Note
1	2	6	Gabriel Tual	France	1:45.03	Q
2	2	7	Mohamed Attaoui	Spain	1:45.19	Q
3	2	5	Andreas Kramer	Sweden	1:45.33	Q
4	2	8	Adrián Ben	Spain	1:45.34	q
5	2	2	Ole Jakob Solbu	Norway	1:45.59	q
6	2	9	Francesco Pernici	Italy	1:45.61	SB
7	2	3	Ryan Clarke	Netherlands	1:46.00	
8	1	8	Catalin Tecuceanu	Italy	1:46.30	Q
9	1	5	Elliot Giles	Great Britain	1:46.50	Q
10	1	3	Álvaro de Arriba	Spain	1:46.57	Q
11	1	7	Paul Anselmini	France	1:46.62	
12	1	4	Jakub Dudycha	Czech Republic	1:46.94	
13	1	6	Simone Barontini	Italy	1:47.10	
14	1	2	Filip Ostrowski	Poland	1:47.15	
15	1	9	Marino Bloudek	Croatia	1:47.16	
16	2	4	Thomas Randolph	Great Britain	1:49.18	

=== Final ===
The final is scheduled for 22:27 on 9 June 2024 in Stadio Olimpico, Rome.

Rank	Lane	Name	Nationality	Time	Note
1st place, gold medalist(s)	6	Gabriel Tual	France	1:44.87	
2nd place, silver medalist(s)	7	Mohamed Attaoui	Spain	1:45.20	
3rd place, bronze medalist(s)	8	Catalin Tecuceanu	Italy	1:45.40	
4	2	Álvaro de Arriba	Spain	1:45.64	
5	9	Andreas Kramer	Sweden	1:45.70	
6	5	Adrián Ben	Spain	1:46.54	
7	4	Elliot Giles	Great Britain	1:47.06	
8	3	Ole Jakob Solbu	Norway	1:51.33	
