= 2026 European Athletics Championships – Men's 800 metres =

Men's 800 metres at the 2026 European Athletics Championships
- Venue: Alexander Stadium
- Location: Birmingham, United Kingdom
- Dates: 10 August 2026 (round 1); 12 August 2026 (semi-finals); 13 August 2026 (final)
- Competitors: 30 from 17 nations
- Winning time: 1:45.26

Medalists
gold medal	Mark English	Ireland
silver medal	Marino Bloudek	Croatia
bronze medal	Mohamed Attaoui	Spain

Official Video Highlights

The men's 800 metres at the 2026 European Athletics Championships took place over three rounds at the Alexander Stadium in Birmingham, United Kingdom, from 10 to 13 August 2026.

== Background ==
Records before the 2026 European Athletics Championships
Record	Athlete (nation)	Time	Location	Date
World record	David Rudisha (KEN)	1:40.91	London, United Kingdom	9 August 2012
European record	Wilson Kipketer (DEN)	1:41.11	Köln, Germany	24 August 1997
Championship record	Olaf Beyer (GDR)	1:43.84	Prague, Czechoslovakia	31 August 1978
World leading	Marco Arop (CAN)	1:41.84	Paris, France	28 June 2026
European leading	Mark English (IRL)	1:42.97	London, United Kingdom	18 July 2026

== Qualification ==
For the men's 800 metres, the qualification period was from 27 July 2025 to 26 July 2026. Athletes qualified by running the entry standard of 1:44.80 min or faster, by wildcard for the 2024 European Athletics Champion, or by their position on the World Athletics Rankings for the event. The target number was 32 athletes.

Qualification standings per 31 July 2026
QP	CP	Country	Athlete	PB	SB	Status	Details
1	1	France	Gabriel Tual	1:41.61	1:43.66	Qualified by Wild Card	Defending European Champion
2	1	Ireland	Cian McPhillips	1:42.15	1:43.97	Qualified by Entry Standard	1:42.15 - National Stadium, Tokyo (JPN) - 20 SEP 2025
3	1	Spain	Mohamed Attaoui	1:42.04	1:44.28	Qualified by Entry Standard	1:42.21 - National Stadium, Tokyo (JPN) - 20 SEP 2025
4	1	Great Britain & N.I.	Max Burgin	1:42.29	1:42.98	Qualified by Entry Standard	1:42.29 - National Stadium, Tokyo (JPN) - 20 SEP 2025
5	2	Ireland	Mark English	1:42.97	1:42.97	Qualified by Entry Standard	1:42.97 - Olympic Stadium, London (GBR) - 18 JUL 2026
6	2	Great Britain & N.I.	Ben Pattison	1:42.27	1:43.34	Qualified by Entry Standard	1:43.34 - Olympic Stadium, London (GBR) - 18 JUL 2026
7	1	Italy	Francesco Pernici	1:43.60	1:43.60	Qualified by Entry Standard	1:43.60 - Stade Raymond Petit, Tomblaine (FRA) - 03 JUL 2026
8	2	Spain	David Barroso	1:43.60	1:43.60	Qualified by Entry Standard	1:43.60 - Nemzeti Atlétikai Központ, Budapest (HUN) - 14 JUL 2026
9	1	Norway	Tobias Grønstad	1:43.61	1:43.61	Qualified by Entry Standard	1:43.61 - Bislett Stadion, Oslo (NOR) - 10 JUN 2026
10	2	France	Yanis Meziane	1:43.71	1:43.96	Qualified by Entry Standard	1:43.71 - Nemzeti Atlétikai Központ, Budapest (HUN) - 12 AUG 2025
11	3	France	Louey Ouerrat	1:43.80	1:43.80	Qualified by Entry Standard	1:43.80 - Parc des Sports C. Ehrmann, Nice (FRA) - 13 JUN 2026
12	1	Belgium	Eliott Crestan	1:42.43	1:43.83	Qualified by Entry Standard	1:43.83 - Atletická hala, Ostrava (CZE) (i) - 03 FEB 2026
13	1	Poland	Maciej Wyderka	1:43.97	1:43.97	Qualified by Entry Standard	1:43.97 - Nemzeti Atlétikai Központ, Budapest (HUN) - 14 JUL 2026
14	1	Sweden	Andreas Kramer	1:43.13	1:48.14	Qualified by Entry Standard	1:44.10 - Nemzeti Atlétikai Központ, Budapest (HUN) - 12 AUG 2025
15	3	Great Britain & N.I.	Alex Botterill	1:44.16	1:44.16	Qualified by Entry Standard	1:44.16 - Parc des Sports C. Ehrmann, Nice (FRA) - 13 JUN 2026
16	1	Croatia	Marino Bloudek	1:44.01	1:44.63	Qualified by Entry Standard	1:44.33 - National Stadium, Tokyo (JPN) - 18 SEP 2025
17	4	France	Jordan Terrasse	1:44.39	1:44.39	Qualified by Entry Standard	1:44.39 - Stade Raymond Troussier, Decines (FRA) - 04 JUL 2026
18	2	Poland	Bartosz Kitliński	1:44.56	1:44.56	Qualified by Entry Standard	1:44.56 - Paul-Greifzu-Stadion, Dessau (GER) - 19 JUN 2026
19	2	Italy	Giovanni Lazzaro	1:44.59	1:44.59	Qualified by Entry Standard	1:44.59 - Golęcin Stadion, Poznan (POL) - 28 JUN 2026
reserve	5	France	Corentin Le Clezio	1:44.25	1:44.67	Qualified by Entry Standard	1:44.67 - Stade Raymond Petit, Tomblaine (FRA) - 03 JUL 2026
20	3	Poland	Filip Ostrowski	1:44.25	1:44.68	Qualified by Entry Standard	1:44.68 - The Track at New Balance, Boston, MA (USA) (i) - 24 JAN 2026
21	1	Netherlands	Tony van Diepen	1:44.14	1:45.36	Qualified by Entry Standard	1:44.70 - Stade universitaire de St-Léonard, Fribourg (SUI) - 13 AUG 2025
22	1	Switzerland	Ramon Wipfli	1:44.71	1:44.71	Qualified by Entry Standard	1:44.71 - Parc des Sports C. Ehrmann, Nice (FRA) - 13 JUN 2026
23	2	Netherlands	Ryan Clarke	1:44.70	1:44.72	Qualified by Entry Standard	1:44.72 - The Track at New Balance, Boston, MA (USA) (i) - 24 JAN 2026
24	3	Spain	Pablo Sánchez-Valladares	1:44.46	1:45.13	Qualified by Entry Standard	1:44.79 - National Stadium, Beijing (CHN) - 07 SEP 2025
25	1	Czech Republic	Jakub Dudycha	1:44.48	1:44.79	Qualified by Entry Standard	1:44.79 - LAZ Wien, Wien (AUT) - 20 JUN 2026
26	1	Malta	Jared Micallef	1:46.08	1:46.93	Qualified by Universality Place	
27	1	Kosovo	Leon Thaqi	1:49.05	1:49.05	Qualified by Universality Place	
28	1	Germany	Alexander Stepanov	1:44.17	1:45.13	Qualified by World Rankings	20th - 1232 points
29	2	Switzerland	Ivan Pelizza	1:44.53	1:45.91	Qualified by World Rankings	33rd - 1199 points
30	3	Italy	Catalin Tecuceanu	1:43.75	1:45.59	Qualified by World Rankings	35th - 1196 points
reserve	4	Spain	Ronaldo Olivo	1:44.87	1:45.29	Qualified by World Rankings	36th - 1196 points
reserve	4	Great Britain & N.I.	Jack Higgins	1:44.81	1:44.81	Qualified by World Rankings	38th - 1194 points
31	1	Turkey	Ömer Faruk Bozdağ	1:45.14	1:45.14	Qualified by World Rankings	42nd - 1191 points
32	1	Slovenia	Jan Vukovič	1:45.85	1:46.11	Qualified by World Rankings	51st - 1179 points
reserve	3	Switzerland	Robin Oester	1:45.39	1:45.39	Next best by World Rankings	63rd - 1159 points
reserve	1	Austria	Cass Elliott	1:45.67	1:46.02	Next best by World Rankings	64th - 1157 points
reserve	3	Ireland	Cillian Kirwan	1:45.63	1:45.63	Next best by World Rankings	66th - 1155 points
reserve	1	Hungary	János Kubasi	1:45.89	1:45.89	Next best by World Rankings	68th - 1153 points
reserve	1	Portugal	David Garcia	1:46.88	1:46.96	Next best by World Rankings	70th - 1151 points
reserve	2	Croatia	Nino Jambrešić	1:46.97	1:47.29	Next best by World Rankings	76th - 1143 points
reserve	4	Italy	Thomas Monnetti	1:46.34	1:46.34	Next best by World Rankings	84th - 1138 points

Bye to semi-finals	Reserve activated	Withdrawal / reserve unused

== Schedule ==
Date	Time	Round
10 August 2026	10:45	Round 1
12 August 2026	12:20	Semi-finals
13 August 2026	21:28	Final

All times are local times (UTC+1)

== Results ==
=== Round 1 ===
Round 1 was held on 10 August 2026, at 10:45 in the morning. The first 3 in each heat (Q) and the next 4 fastest (q) advanced to the semi-finals.

==== Heat 1 ====
Place	Athlete	Nation	Time	Notes
1	Mark English	Ireland	1:46.96	Q
2	Marino Bloudek	Croatia	1:47.23	Q
3	Giovanni Lazzaro	Italy	1:47.53	Q
4	Louey Ouerrat	France	1:47.58	
5	Pablo Sánchez-Valladares	Spain	1:47.96	
6	Ömer Faruk Bozdağ	Turkey	1:48.41	
7	Leon Thaqi	Kosovo	1:50.67	

==== Heat 2 ====
Place	Athlete	Nation	Time	Notes
1	Yanis Meziane	France	1:45.10	Q
2	Mohamed Attaoui	Spain	1:45.26	Q
3	Filip Ostrowski	Poland	1:45.35	Q
4	Ben Pattison	Great Britain & N.I.	1:45.40	q
5	Tobias Grønstad	Norway	1:45.85	q
6	Catalin Tecuceanu	Italy	1:46.44	
7	Jared Micallef	Malta	1:46.89	SB
8	Jakub Dudycha	Czech Republic	1:48.85	

==== Heat 3 ====
Place	Athlete	Nation	Time	Notes
1	Francesco Pernici	Italy	1:45.31	Q
2	Corentin Le Clezio	France	1:45.43	Q
3	Ryan Clarke	Netherlands	1:45.74	Q
4	David Barroso	Spain	1:45.90	q
5	Maciej Wyderka	Poland	1:46.58	
6	Alex Botterill	Great Britain & N.I.	1:46.90	
7	Jan Vukovič	Slovenia	1:47.80	
8	Ivan Pelizza	Switzerland	1:49.42	

==== Heat 4 ====
Place	Athlete	Nation	Time	Notes
1	Max Burgin	Great Britain & N.I.	1:45.80	Q
2	Andreas Kramer	Sweden	1:46.05	Q, SB
3	Alexander Stepanov	Germany	1:46.27	Q
4	Gabriel Tual	France	1:46.33	q
5	Bartosz Kitliński	Poland	1:46.45	
6	Ramon Wipfli	Switzerland	1:46.52	
7	Cian McPhillips	Ireland	1:46.84	

=== Semi-finals ===
The semi-finals were held on 12 August 2026, at 12:20 in the afternoon. The first 3 (Q) from each heat and the next 2 fastest (q) qualified for the final.

==== Heat 1 ====
Place	Athlete	Nation	Time	Notes
1	Mark English	Ireland	1:43.49	Q, CR
2	Ben Pattison	Great Britain & N.I.	1:43.72	Q
3	Corentin Le Clezio	France	1:43.80	Q, PB
4	Mohamed Attaoui	Spain	1:43.82	q, SB
5	Francesco Pernici	Italy	1:43.84	q
6	Yanis Meziane	France	1:44.03	
7	Filip Ostrowski	Poland	1:44.08	PB
8	Andreas Kramer	Sweden	1:44.67	SB

==== Heat 2 ====
Place	Athlete	Nation	Time	Notes
1	Max Burgin	Great Britain & N.I.	1:44.73	Q
2	Marino Bloudek	Croatia	1:44.96	Q
3	David Barroso	Spain	1:44.96	Q
4	Tobias Grønstad	Norway	1:45.26	
5	Gabriel Tual	France	1:45.88	
6	Alexander Stepanov	Germany	1:45.46	
7	Giovanni Lazzaro	Italy	1:46.10	
8	Ryan Clarke	Netherlands	1:46.17	

=== Final ===
The final was held on 13 August 2026, at 21:28 in the evening.

Place	Athlete	Nation	Time	Notes
1st place, gold medalist(s)	Mark English	Ireland	1:45.26	
2nd place, silver medalist(s)	Marino Bloudek	Croatia	1:45.62	
3rd place, bronze medalist(s)	Mohamed Attaoui	Spain	1:45.71	
4	David Barroso	Spain	1:45.75	
5	Francesco Pernici	Italy	1:45.77	
6	Ben Pattison	Great Britain & N.I.	1:46.14	
7	Corentin Le Clezio	France	1:46.24	
—	Max Burgin	Great Britain & N.I.	DNS	
