= Athletics at the 2024 Summer Olympics – Men's 800 metres =

Men's 800 metres at the Games of the XXXIII Olympiad
- Venue: Stade de France, Paris, France
- Dates: 7 August 2024 (heats); 8 August 2024 (repechage round); 9 August 2024 (semi-finals); 10 August 2024 (final)
- Winning time: 1:41.19

Medalists
1st place, gold medalist(s)		Emmanuel Wanyonyi	Kenya
2nd place, silver medalist(s)		Marco Arop	Canada
3rd place, bronze medalist(s)		Djamel Sedjati	Algeria

The men's 800 metres at the 2024 Summer Olympics was held in four rounds at the Stade de France in Paris, France, between 7 and 10 August 2024. This was the 30th time that the men's 800 metres was contested at the Summer Olympics. A total of 48 athletes were able to qualify for the event by entry standard or ranking.

== Summary ==
None of the previous Olympic podium returned. Emmanuel Korir had won in 2021 and also the 2022 World Championships, which marked a changing of the guard for this event. Silver in 2022 was Djamel Sedjati, while Marco Arop took bronze. Arop won in 2023 in a slow race after getting the jump on Emmanuel Wanyonyi and the field on the backstretch. Wanyonyi closed for second, Ben Pattison got third. Sedjati came in as the World Leader, but the development of that had several significant steps. At the Kenyan Olympic Trials at altitude in Nairobi, Wanyonyi won largely unchallenged by .8 of a second in 1:41.70, which made him then the #3 performer in history. A few weeks later, many contenders met at the 2024 Meeting de Paris. There Wanyonyi improved upon his time to 1:41.58 and finished second to Sedjati's 1:41.56, with Gabriel Tual close at 1:41.61, the first time three athletes broke 1:42 in the same race and they took over #3 through #5 on the all time list. Five days later, Sedjati improved to 1:41.46 at the 2024 Herculis meet in Monaco, with Mohamed Attaoui just missing 1:42 behind him. This new generation was running fast.

The final started off with Max Burgin on the inside making up the stagger on the field early, reaching the break line first. Wanyonyi wanted the lead, accelerating from fifth at the break line to take the tangent to the turn with a clear lead. Tual followed, after being passed by Wanyonyi to assume a position on Wanyonyi's shoulder, boxing Burgin. Hoppel came up behind Tual, the leaders held this positioning for 300 more metres until Tual tried to edge ahead of Wanyonyi on the final backstretch. From the last two position at the bell, Arop followed by Sedjati began to move forward on the outside while Burgin faded back. Arop had arrived at Hoppel as Wanyonyi sped up to shake Tual. It took the entire turn for Arop to get past Hoppel and arrive at Tual while running on the outside. By this point Wanyonyi had a two metre lead. Now everybody sprint the home stretch. The tall Arop gained a little ground on every step. Behind them, Hoppel and Sedjati were out in lane 2 and 3 running stride for stride past Tual. Then Sedjati surged ahead, Hoppel looking down at his legs trying to get them to move faster. As Arop closed down on Wanyonyi his progress seemed to stall. Wanyonyi leaned early for the line, Arop gave his best sprinter's lean for the line but didn't quite get there. Sedjati finished 2 metres back to take bronze from Hoppel by a metre.

The winning margin, between winner Wanyonyi and 2023 World Champion Arop was 0.01 seconds, closer than any other men's 800 metres Olympic final, even closer than Dave Wottle's famous finish in 1972 vs Yevhen Arzhanov which was .03. Furthermore, four athletes; Wanyonyi, Arop, Sedjati, and Bryce Hoppel broke the 1:42 barrier in the same race, with Wanyonyi's winning time of 1:41.19 being 0.28 seconds off David Rudisha's 2012 world (and Olympic) record of 1:40.91. Wanyonyi became the #3 performer in history, Arop #4. Sedjati's better Monaco performance was demoted to #5 and Hoppel #7.

The race was run in a unique way for 800m, with Wanyonyi's first 400m being around 50.3 seconds, making his second around 50.9 seconds. Compared to Rudisha's world record splits of 49.28 and 51.63, Wanyonyi's splits were relatively even. Silver medalist Marco Arop's splits were in fact a negative split, with his first 400m being 51.1 and his second 400m being 50.1.

== Background ==
The men's 800 metres has been present on the Olympic athletics programme since the inaugural edition in 1896.

Global records before the 2024 Summer Olympics
Record	Athlete (nation)	Time (s)	Location	Date
World record	David Rudisha (KEN)	1:40.91	London, United Kingdom	9 August 2012
Olympic record	David Rudisha (KEN)	1:40.91	London, United Kingdom	9 August 2012
World leading	Djamel Sedjati (ALG)	1:41.46	Fontvieille, Monaco	12 July 2024

Area records before the 2024 Summer Olympics
Area record	Athlete (nation)	Time (s)
Africa (records)	David Rudisha (KEN)	1:40.91 WR
Asia (records)	Yusuf Saad Kamel (BHR)	1:42.79
Europe (records)	Wilson Kipketer (DEN)	1:41.11
North, Central America and Caribbean (records)	Donavan Brazier (USA)	1:42.34
Oceania (records)	Joseph Deng (AUS)	1:43.99
South America (records)	Joaquim Cruz (BRA)	1:41.77

== Qualification ==
For the men's 800 metres event, the qualification period was between 1 July 2023 and 30 June 2024. 48 athletes were able to qualify for the event, with a maximum of three athletes per nation, by running the entry standard of 1:44.70 seconds or faster or by their World Athletics Ranking for this event.

== Results ==
=== Heats ===
The heats were held on 7 August, and started at 11:55 (UTC+2) in the morning.

==== Heat 1 ====
Rank	Athlete	Nation	Time	Notes
1	Eliott Crestan	Belgium	1:45.51	Q
2	Marco Arop	Canada	1:45.74	Q
3	Peyton Craig	Australia	1:45.81	Q
4	Handal Roban	Saint Vincent and the Grenadines	1:46.00	
5	Abdelati El Guesse	Morocco	1:46.91	
6	Tumo Nkape	Botswana	1:46.99	
7	Abubaker Haydar Abdalla	Qatar	1:48.42	
8	James Preston	New Zealand	1:48.50	
9	Abraham Guem	South Sudan	1:48.74	PB

==== Heat 2 ====
Rank	Athlete	Nation	Time	Notes
1	Gabriel Tual	France	1:45.13	Q
2	Mark English	Ireland	1:45.15	Q
3	Tshepiso Masalela	Botswana	1:45.58	Q
4	Jakub Dudycha	Czech Republic	1:45.62	
5	Koitatoi Kidali	Kenya	1:45.84	
6	Edose Ibadin	Nigeria	1:46.56	
7	Mohamed Ali Gouaned	Algeria	1:47.34	
8	Ali Idow Hassan	Somalia	1:48.72	
9	Mohammed Dwedar	Palestine	1:54.83	

==== Heat 3 ====
Rank	Athlete	Nation	Time	Notes
1	Emmanuel Wanyonyi	Kenya	1:44.64	Q
2	Catalin Tecuceanu	Italy	1:44.80	Q
3	Andreas Kramer	Sweden	1:44.93	Q
4	Adrián Ben	Spain	1:45.03	
5	Ryan Clarke	Netherlands	1:45.56	
6	Joseph Deng	Australia	1:45.87	
7	Tibo De Smet	Belgium	1:46.03	
8	Brandon Miller	United States	1:46.34	
9	Yervand Mkrtchyan	Armenia	1:49.91	NR

==== Heat 4 ====
Rank	Athlete	Nation	Time	Notes
1	Djamel Sedjati	Algeria	1:45.84	Q
2	Elliot Giles	Great Britain	1:45.93	Q
3	Hobbs Kessler	United States	1:46.15	Q
4	Simone Barontini	Italy	1:46.33	
5	Elvin Josué Canales	Spain	1:46.48	
6	Pieter Sisk	Belgium	1:46.60	
7	Peter Bol	Australia	1:47.50	
8	Dennick Luke	Dominica	1:47.54	
9	Musa Suliman	Refugee Olympic Team	1:49.61	

==== Heat 5 ====
Rank	Athlete	Nation	Time	Notes
1	Ben Pattison	Great Britain	1:45.56	Q
2	Edmund Du Plessis	South Africa	1:45.73	Q
3	Wyclife Kinyamal	Kenya	1:45.86	Q
4	Benjamin Robert	France	1:45.92	
5	Navasky Anderson	Jamaica	1:46.82	
6	Tobias Grønstad	Norway	1:46.85	
7	Mateusz Borkowski	Poland	1:47.50	
8	José Antonio Maita	Venezuela	1:48.02	
9	Chhun Bunthorn	Cambodia	1:53.31	

==== Heat 6 ====
Rank	Athlete	Nation	Time	Notes
1	Mohamed Attaoui	Spain	1.44.81	Q
2	Bryce Hoppel	United States	1:45.24	Q
3	Max Burgin	Great Britain	1:45.36	Q
4	Corentin Le Clezio	France	1:45.42	
5	Jesús Tonatiú López	Mexico	1:45.82	
6	Tom Dradriga	Uganda	1:46.05	
7	Kethobogile Haingura	Botswana	1:46.46	
8	Slimane Moula	Algeria	1:46.71	

=== Repechage round ===
The repechage round was held on 8 August, and started at 12:00 (UTC+2) in the afternoon.

==== Heat 1 ====
Rank	Athlete	Nation	Time	Notes
1	Kethobogile Haingura	Botswana	1:45.52	Q
2	Slimane Moula	Algeria	1:45.67	
3	Corentin Le Clezio	France	1:45.72	
4	Peter Bol	Australia	1:46.12	
5	Tom Dradriga	Uganda	1:46.15	
6	Dennick Luke	Dominica	1:46.81	NR
7	Edose Ibadin	Nigeria	1:49.09	
8	Chhun Bunthorn	Cambodia	1:53.42	
	Abdelati El Guesse	Morocco	DNS	

==== Heat 2 ====
Rank	Athlete	Nation	Time	Notes
1	Jesús Tonatiú López	Mexico	1:45.13	Q
2	Adrián Ben	Spain	1:45.37	
3	Pieter Sisk	Belgium	1:45.49	
4	Handal Roban	Saint Vincent and the Grenadines	1:45.80	
5	Navasky Anderson	Jamaica	1:46.01	
6	Koitatoi Kidali	Kenya	1:46.37	
7	Jakub Dudycha	Czech Republic	1:49.94	
8	Yervand Mkrtchyan	Armenia	1:50.07	
9	Musa Suliman	Refugee Olympic Team	1:50.11	

==== Heat 3 ====
Rank	Athlete	Nation	Time	Notes
1	Simone Barontini	Italy	1:45.56	Q
2	Benjamin Robert	France	1:45.83	
3	José Antonio Maita	Venezuela	1:46.44	
4	Tibo De Smet	Belgium	1:46.59	
5	Joseph Deng	Australia	1:48.58	
6	James Preston	New Zealand	1:50.53	
	Abubaker Haydar Abdalla	Qatar	DNS	
	Ali Idow Hassan	Somalia	DNS	

==== Heat 4 ====
Rank	Athlete	Nation	Time	Notes
1	Brandon Miller	United States	1:44.21	Q
2	Mohamed Ali Gouaned	Algeria	1:44.37	q, =PB
3	Tobias Grønstad	Norway	1:44.57	q, PB
4	Elvin Josué Canales	Spain	1:44.65	
5	Ryan Clarke	Netherlands	1:44.70	PB
6	Mateusz Borkowski	Poland	1:45.27	PB
7	Tumo Nkape	Botswana	1:45.57	
8	Abraham Guem	South Sudan	1:49.45	
9	Mohammed Dwedar	Palestine	1:54.83	

=== Semi-finals ===
The semi-finals were held on 9 August, and started at 11:30 (UTC+2) in the morning.

==== Semifinal 1 ====
Rank	Athlete	Nation	Time	Notes
1	Djamel Sedjati	Algeria	1:45.08	Q
2	Tshepiso Masalela	Botswana	1:45.33	Q
3	Catalin Tecuceanu	Italy	1:45.38	
4	Ben Pattison	Great Britain	1:45.57	SB
5	Brandon Miller	United States	1:45.79	
6	Mark English	Ireland	1:45.97	
7	Andreas Kramer	Sweden	1:46.73	
8	Jesús Tonatiú López	Mexico	1:50.38	

==== Semifinal 2 ====
Rank	Athlete	Nation	Time	Notes
1	Marco Arop	Canada	1:45.05	Q
2	Gabriel Tual	France	1:45.16	Q
3	Wyclife Kinyamal	Kenya	1:45.29	
4	Edmund du Plessis	South Africa	1:45.34	
5	Elliot Giles	Great Britain	1:45.46	
6	Hobbs Kessler	United States	1:46.20	
7	Tobias Grønstad	Norway	1:46.37	
8	Mohamed Ali Gouaned	Algeria	1:46.52	

==== Semifinal 3 ====
Rank	Athlete	Nation	Time	Notes
1	Emmanuel Wanyonyi	Kenya	1:43.32	Q
2	Bryce Hoppel	United States	1:43.41	Q
3	Max Burgin	Great Britain	1:43.50	q, PB
4	Mohamed Attaoui	Spain	1:43.69	q
5	Eliott Crestan	Belgium	1:43.72	
6	Peyton Craig	Australia	1:44.11	AU20R
7	Kethobogile Haingura	Botswana	1:44.95	
8	Simone Barontini	Italy	1:46.17	

=== Final ===
The final was held on 10 August, starting at 19:25 (UTC+2) in the evening.

Rank	Athlete	Nation	Time	Notes
1st place, gold medalist(s)	Emmanuel Wanyonyi	Kenya	1:41.19	PB
2nd place, silver medalist(s)	Marco Arop	Canada	1:41.20	AR
3rd place, bronze medalist(s)	Djamel Sedjati	Algeria	1:41.50	
4	Bryce Hoppel	United States	1:41.67	NR
5	Mohamed Attaoui	Spain	1:42.08	
6	Gabriel Tual	France	1:42.14	
7	Tshepiso Masalela	Botswana	1:42.82	PB
8	Max Burgin	Great Britain	1:43.84	
