= 2025 World Athletics Championships – Men's 800 metres =

Men's 800 metres at the 2025 World Athletics Championships
- Venue: National Stadium
- Location: Tokyo, Japan
- Dates: 16 September (heats); 18 September (semi-finals); 20 September (final)
- Competitors: 66 from 35 nations
- Winning time: 1:41.86 CR

Medalists
gold medal	Emmanuel Wanyonyi	Kenya
silver medal	Djamel Sedjati	Algeria
bronze medal	Marco Arop	Canada

The men's 800 metres at the 2025 World Athletics Championships was held at the National Stadium in Tokyo on 16, 18 and 20 September 2025.

== Records ==
Before the competition records were as follows:

Record	Athlete & Nat.	Perf.	Location	Date
World record	David Rudisha (KEN)	1:40.91	London, United Kingdom	9 August 2012
Championship record	Donavan Brazier (USA)	1:42.34	Doha, Qatar	1 October 2019
World Leading	Emmanuel Wanyonyi (KEN)	1:41.44	Fontvieille, Monaco	11 July 2025
African Record	David Rudisha (KEN)	1:40.91	London, United Kingdom	9 August 2012
Asian Record	Yusuf Saad Kamel (BHR)	1:42.79	Fontvieille, Monaco	29 July 2008
European Record	Wilson Kipketer (DEN)	1:41.11	Cologne, Germany	24 August 1997
North, Central American and Caribbean record	Marco Arop (CAN)	1:41.20	Paris, France	10 August 2024
Oceanian record	Peter Bol (AUS)	1:42.55	Fontvieille, Monaco	11 July 2025
South American Record	Joaquim Cruz (BRA)	1:41.77	Cologne, West Germany	26 August 1984

== Qualification standard ==
The standard to qualify automatically for entry was 1:44.50.

== Schedule ==
The event schedule, in local time (UTC+9), was as follows:

Date	Time	Round
16 September	19:35	Heats
18 September	21:45	Semi-finals
20 September	22:22	Final

== Results ==
=== Heats ===
The heats took place on 16 September. The first three athletes in each heat ( Q ) and the three fastest ( q ) qualified for the semi-finals.

==== Heat 1 ====
Place	Athlete	Nation	Time	Notes
1	David Barroso	Spain	1:44.96	Q
2	Djamel Sedjati	Algeria	1:45.01	Q
3	Kethobogile Haingura	Botswana	1:45.02	Q
4	Ibrahim Abass M Chuot	Qatar	1:45.16	
5	Handal Roban	Saint Vincent and the Grenadines	1:45.32	
6	Ngeno Kipngetich	Kenya	1:45.37	
7	Jared Micallef	Malta	1:46.62	
8	Giovanni Lazzaro	Italy	1:47.00	
9	Justin O'Toole	Canada	1:48.88	

==== Heat 2 ====
Place	Athlete	Nation	Time	Notes
1	Mohamed Attaoui	Spain	1:45.23	Q
2	Kelvin Loti	Kenya	1:45.35	Q
3	Marco Arop	Canada	1:45.39	Q
4	Samuel Chapple	Netherlands	1:45.45	
5	Tiarnan Crorken	Great Britain & N.I.	1:45.63	
6	Tom Dradriga	Uganda	1:46.18	
7	Pieter Sisk	Belgium	1:46.37	
8	Abdelati El Guesse	Morocco	1:46.80	
9	Musa Suliman	Athlete Refugee Team	1:48.28	SB

==== Heat 3 ====
Place	Athlete	Nation	Time	Notes
1	Maciej Wyderka	Poland	1:46.30	Q
2	Ben Pattison	Great Britain & N.I.	1:46.51	Q
3	Gabriel Tual	France	1:46.54	Q
4	Mariano García	Spain	1:47.09	
5	Moad Zahafi	Morocco	1:47.14	
6	Ebrahim Alzofairi	Kuwait	1:47.26	
7	Cooper Lutkenhaus	United States	1:47.68	
8	Matthew Erickson	Canada	1:48.49	
9	Hein Aung	Myanmar	1:52.70	

==== Heat 4 ====
Place	Athlete	Nation	Time	Notes
1	Cian McPhillips	Ireland	1:44.91	Q
2	Bryce Hoppel	United States	1:45.09	Q
3	Tyrice Taylor	Jamaica	1:45.13	Q
4	Peter Bol	Australia	1:45.15	
5	Ivan Pelizza	Switzerland	1:45.65	
6	Catalin Tecuceanu	Italy	1:46.22	
7	Alexander Stepanov	Germany	1:46.32	
8	Andreas Kramer	Sweden	1:46.84	
9	Stephen Rahuasi	Solomon Islands	1:55.21	

==== Heat 5 ====
Place	Athlete	Nation	Time	Notes
1	Emmanuel Wanyonyi	Kenya	1:45.05	Q
2	Francesco Pernici	Italy	1:45.11	Q
3	Mark English	Ireland	1:45.13	Q
4	Peyton Craig	Australia	1:45.44	
5	Mohamed Ali Gouaned	Algeria	1:45.49	
6	Tobias Grønstad	Norway	1:45.93	
7	Ko Ochiai	Japan	1:46.78	
8	Abdullahi Hassan	Canada	1:47.50	
9	Ryan Clarke	Netherlands	1:49.08	

==== Heat 6 ====
Place	Athlete	Nation	Time	Notes
1	Max Burgin	Great Britain & N.I.	1:44.73	Q
2	Tshepiso Masalela	Botswana	1:44.74	Q
3	Navasky Anderson	Jamaica	1:44.87	Q
4	Yanis Meziane	France	1:45.02	q
5	Eliott Crestan	Belgium	1:45.05	q
6	Luke Boyes	Australia	1:45.54	
7	Patryk Sieradzki	Poland	1:45.99	
8	Yohannes Tefera	Ethiopia	1:50.93	
9	Mohammed Dwedar	Palestine	1:53.63	

==== Heat 7 ====
Place	Athlete	Nation	Time	Notes
1	Donavan Brazier	United States	1:44.66	Q
2	Slimane Moula	Algeria	1:44.77	Q
3	Marino Bloudek	Croatia	1:44.78	Q
4	Nicholas Kebenei	Kenya	1:44.91	q
5	Filip Ostrowski	Poland	1:45.47	
6	Jakub Dudycha	Czech Republic	1:45.76	
7	Abderrahman El Assal	Morocco	1:46.12	
8	Alex Amankwah	Ghana	1:47.12	
9	Eduardo Moreira	Brazil	1:50.40	

=== Semi-finals ===
The semi-finals took place on 18 September. The first two athletes in each heat ( Q ) and the two fastest ( q ) qualified for the final.

==== Heat 1 ====
Place	Athlete	Nation	Time	Notes
1	Marco Arop	Canada	1:45.09	Q
2	Djamel Sedjati	Algeria	1:45.09	Q
3	Mark English	Ireland	1:45.47	
4	Maciej Wyderka	Poland	1:45.55	
5	Ben Pattison	Great Britain & N.I.	1:45.84	
6	Kethobogile Haingura	Botswana	1:46.05	
7	Tyrice Taylor	Jamaica	1:46.56	
8	Nicholas Kebenei	Kenya	1:49.54	

==== Heat 2 ====
Place	Athlete	Nation	Time	Notes
1	Cian McPhillips	Ireland	1:43.18	Q, NR
2	Max Burgin	Great Britain & N.I.	1:43.37	Q
3	Donavan Brazier	United States	1:43.82	
4	Francesco Pernici	Italy	1:43.84	PB
5	Gabriel Tual	France	1:44.09	
6	David Barroso	Spain	1:44.27	
7	Kelvin Loti	Kenya	1:44.82	
8	Slimane Moula	Algeria	1:46.82	

==== Heat 3 ====
Place	Athlete	Nation	Time	Notes
1	Mohamed Attaoui	Spain	1:43.18	Q
2	Emmanuel Wanyonyi	Kenya	1:43.47	Q
3	Navasky Anderson	Jamaica	1:43.72	q, NR
4	Tshepiso Masalela	Botswana	1:43.80	q
5	Bryce Hoppel	United States	1:43.92	
6	Yanis Meziane	France	1:44.12	
7	Marino Bloudek	Croatia	1:44.33	
8	Eliott Crestan	Belgium	1:44.56	

=== Final ===
Place	Athlete	Nation	Time	Notes
1st place, gold medalist(s)	Emmanuel Wanyonyi	Kenya	1:41.86	CR
2nd place, silver medalist(s)	Djamel Sedjati	Algeria	1:41.90	SB
3rd place, bronze medalist(s)	Marco Arop	Canada	1:41.95	SB
4	Cian McPhillips	Ireland	1:42.15	NR
5	Mohamed Attaoui	Spain	1:42.21	SB
6	Max Burgin	Great Britain & N.I.	1:42.29	PB
7	Navasky Anderson	Jamaica	1:42.76	NR
8	Tshepiso Masalela	Botswana	1:42.77	
