= Ramon Wipfli =

Swiss athlete (born 2004)

Personal information
- Nationality: Swiss
- Born: 30 June 2004 (age 22)

Sport
- Sport: Athletics
- Event: 800 m

Achievements and titles
- Personal bests: 800 m: 1:44.71 (Nice, 2026)
Medal record
Men's athletics
Representing Switzerland
European Games
Gold medal – first place	2023 Kraków-Małopolska	800 m
European U20 Championships
Silver medal – second place	2023 Jerusalem	800 m

Ramon Wipfli (born 30 June 2004) is a Swiss middle-distance runner. He has won Swiss national championship titles, and the 2023 European Athletics Team Championships, over 800 metres.

== Biography ==
Wipfli is from Bern. He won a silver medal in Jerusalem over 800 metres at the 2023 European Athletics U20 Championships behind the Czech Jakub Dudycha, who was initially disqualified and then reinstated following a protest by the Czech officials. He won the 800 metres at the 2023 European Athletics Team Championships in Poland, in a personal best 1:46.73. He became Swiss national champion over 800 metres for the first time in 2023 in Bellinzona.

In May 2024, at the Whitsun meeting in Rehlingen, Germany, Wipfli, competing for ST Bern, ran a 1:45.38 personal best to move to third on the Swiss all-time best list behind only former world champion André Bucher, and Markus Trinkler. In June 2024, he competed at the 2024 European Athletics Championships in Rome. Later that month, he retained his Swiss national 800 metres title.

Wipfli reached the semi-finals of the 800 metres at the 2025 European Athletics Indoor Championships with a personal best time of 1:44.92, under the championship record set in 1999 by Nils Schumann.

Wipfli won the Swiss Indoor Championships over 1500 metres on 1 March 2026, running 3:49.11 in the final. He ran a personal best to finish third behind Louey Ouerrat and Alex Botterill in a time of 1:44.71 for the 800 metres at the Meeting Nikaia on 13 June 2026. In August, he competed at the 2026 European Athletics Championships in Birmingham, England, in the 800 metres.
