= Alex Botterill =

British middle-distance runner (born 2000)

Personal information
- Born: 18 January 2000 (age 26) York, England

Sport
- Sport: Athletics
- Events: Middle-distance running, Cross Country running
- Club: City of York AC

Achievements and titles
- Personal bests: 800m: 1:44.16 (2026); 1500: 3:40.57 (2023)
Medal record
Men's athletics
Representing England
Commonwealth Youth Games
Gold medal – first place	2017 Nassau	800 metres

Alex Botterill (born 18 January 2000) is a British middle-distance and cross country runner.

== Biography ==
From York, Botterill attended Archbishop Holgate's School, and trained at member of the City of York Athletics Club. A successful junior athlete, Botterill won double gold at the 2016 School Games in Loughborough, running a time of 1:56.01 minutes to win the 800 metres before later running for England North East as they won the 4 x 400 metres relay. The following year, Botterill won the gold medal over 800 metres at the 2017 Commonwealth Youth Games in Nassau, Bahamas. In January 2018, he made his senior England debut in the Great Edinburgh Cross Country. Coached by Andrew Henderson, Botterill won the under-20 title at the English National Championships in Bedford in 2018 over 800 metres in 1:53.53. He was selected for the 2018 World U20 Championships in Tampere, Finland, placing sixth in the 800 metres final.

Botterill later became coached by former British champion middle-distance runner Steve Cram. On 2 August 2025, he qualified for the final of the 800 metres at the 2025 UK Athletics Championships in Birmingham in a time of 1:46.42, before placing third in the final the following day finishing behind Tiarnan Crorken and Max Burgin and running a time of 1:45.57.

Botterill was a finalist at the 2026 British Indoor Athletics Championships in Birmingham on 14 February 2026, placing fifth overall.

In May, he placed second ahead of fellow-Brit Justin Davies in the 800 metres at the Trond Mohn Games in Bergen, finishing in a time of 1:46.32. He ran a personal best to finish runner-up to Louey Ouerrat in a time of 1:44.16 for the 800 metres at the Meeting Nikaia on 13 June 2026. On 21 June, he placed third behind Ben Pattison and winner Jake Wightman in 1:46.01 in the 800 metres final at the 2026 UK Athletics Championships. Competing in the 2026 Diamond League at the 2026 London Athletics Meet on 18 July, he ran 1:44.71 for the 800 metres. He was selected to represent England at the 2026 Commonwealth Games in Glasgow, qualifying for the final of the 800 metres with a semi-final time of 1:45.39 before placing fifth overall in a physical race. On 10 August, he competed for Great Britain at the 2026 European Championships but did not advance from the 800 metres heats.
