= 2018 IAAF World U20 Championships – Men's 800 metres =

Men's 800 metres at the 2018 World U20 Championships
- Venue: Ratina Stadium
- Dates: 13, 14 and 15 July
- Competitors: 29 from 20 nations
- Winning time: 1:46.45

Medalists
gold medal	Solomon Lekuta	Kenya
silver medal	Ngeno Kipngetich	Kenya
bronze medal	Eliott Crestan	Belgium

The men's 800 metres at the 2018 IAAF World U20 Championships was held at Ratina Stadium on 13, 14 and 15 July.

== Records ==
Standing records prior to the 2018 IAAF World U20 Championships in Athletics
World Junior Record	Nijel Amos (BOT)	1:41.73	London, United Kingdom	9 August 2012
Championship Record	Nijel Amos (BOT)	1:43.79	Barcelona, Spain	15 July 2012
World Junior Leading	Tolesa Bodena (ETH)	1:45.56	Huelva, Spain	8 June 2018

== Results ==
=== Heats ===
Qualification: First 3 of each heat (Q) and the 4 fastest times (q) qualified for the semifinals.

Rank	Heat	Name	Nationality	Time	Note
1	3	Solomon Lekuta	Kenya	1:48.19	Q
2	3	Marino Bloudek	Croatia	1:48.54	Q
3	3	Markhim Lonsdale	Great Britain	1:48.60	Q, SB
4	3	Adisu Girma	Ethiopia	1:48.60	q
5	1	Josh Hoey	United States	1:48.86	Q
6	1	Eliott Crestan	Belgium	1:48.92	Q
7	4	Ngeno Kipngetich	Kenya	1:49.03	Q
8	1	Sven Cepuš	Croatia	1:49.03	Q, SB
9	1	Juan Diego Castro	Costa Rica	1:49.18	q, NJR
10	3	Pieter Sisk	Belgium	1:49.40	q
11	3	Oussama Cherrad	Algeria	1:49.40	q, PB
12	4	Marcelo Pereira	Portugal	1:49.49	Q, PB
13	4	Rey Rivera	United States	1:49.53	Q
14	4	Eduardo Romero	Spain	1:49.56	
15	1	Beant Singh	India	1:49.66	
16	2	Simone Barontini	Italy	1:49.73	Q
17	1	Mohamed Abouettahery	Morocco	1:50.15	
18	3	Lachlan Raper	Australia	1:50.23	
19	2	Alex Botterill	Great Britain	1:50.26	Q
20	4	Andrea Romani	Italy	1:50.28	
21	4	Marco Vilca	Peru	1:50.47	
22	2	Mehmet Çelik	Turkey	1:50.61	Q
23	2	Kimar Farquharson	Jamaica	1:50.76	
24	1	Archie Wallis	Australia	1:51.25	
25	2	Ruach Chuol Padhal	Canada	1:51.61	
26	2	Lőrinc Varga	Hungary	1:51.67	
27	1	Oskar Schwarzer	Germany	1:52.39	
28	4	Charaf Zahir	Morocco	1:52.95	
	2	Teddese Lemi	Ethiopia	DQ	

=== Semifinals ===
Qualification: First 3 of each heat (Q) and the 2 fastest times (q) qualified for the final.

Rank	Heat	Name	Nationality	Time	Note
1	2	Ngeno Kipngetich	Kenya	1:46.81	Q
2	2	Eliott Crestan	Belgium	1:46.84	Q, NJR
3	2	Simone Barontini	Italy	1:47.35	Q, PB
4	2	Oussama Cherrad	Algeria	1:47.36	q, PB
5	1	Solomon Lekuta	Kenya	1:47.56	Q
6	2	Markhim Lonsdale	Great Britain	1:47.73	q, SB
7	1	Adisu Girma	Ethiopia	1:47.88	Q
8	1	Alex Botterill	Great Britain	1:47.97	Q
9	1	Josh Hoey	United States	1:48.07	PB
10	2	Marino Bloudek	Croatia	1:48.20	, SB
11	1	Sven Cepuš	Croatia	1:48.38	PB
12	1	Mehmet Çelik	Turkey	1:48.53	PB
13	1	Juan Diego Castro	Costa Rica	1:49.13	NJR
14	1	Pieter Sisk	Belgium	1:49.82	
15	2	Rey Rivera	United States	1:50.48	
16	2	Marcelo Pereira	Portugal	1:57.88	

=== Final ===
Rank	Lane	Name	Nationality	Time	Note
1st place, gold medalist(s)	5	Solomon Lekuta	Kenya	1:46.35	
2nd place, silver medalist(s)	4	Ngeno Kipngetich	Kenya	1:46.45	PB
3rd place, bronze medalist(s)	6	Eliott Crestan	Belgium	1:47.27	
4	2	Adisu Girma	Ethiopia	1:47.58	PB
5	3	Simone Barontini	Italy	1:51.08	
6	1	Alex Botterill	Great Britain	1:51.64	
7	7	Markhim Lonsdale	Great Britain	1:57.39	
	8	Oussama Cherrad	Algeria	DQ	
