= 2026 World Athletics Indoor Tour =

Indoor track and field meetings

- Edition: 11th
- Dates: 13 December 2025 – 12 March 2026

The 2026 World Athletics Indoor Tour is the eleventh edition of the World Athletics Indoor Tour, the highest series of international indoor track and field meetings.

The tour returned with the biggest number of meetings yet, with 77 meetings across Europe, North America, and Asia, eight of which comprise the highest tier of events labelled Gold. Below the top tier, there were three other tiers labelled Silver, Bronze, and Challenger mirroring the outdoor World Athletics Continental Tour.

The international media rights for the tour was covered by Infront Sports & Media as part of a deal extending through the end of 2029.

For 2026, the Gold Level scoring disciplines were the men's 60m, 800m, 3000/5000m, triple jump, shot put and pole vault, as well as the women's 400m, 1500m, 60m hurdles, long jump, and high jump. Each athlete's best three results counted toward their overall point score. The athlete with the most points in each scoring discipline at the end of the tour was declared the winner, and was offered a wild card entry for the 2026 World Athletics Indoor Championships.

== Meetings ==
Date	Meeting	Venue	Country
Gold Level Meetings (8)
24 Jan	New Balance Indoor Grand Prix	Boston	United States
1 Feb	Millrose Games	New York City	United States
3 Feb	Czech Indoor Gala	Ostrava	Czech Republic
6 Feb	World Indoor Tour Gold Madrid	Madrid	Spain
8 Feb	INIT Meeting Karlsruhe	Karlsruhe	Germany
11 Feb	Belgrade Indoor Meeting	Belgrade	Serbia
19 Feb	Meeting Hauts-de-France Pas-de-Calais "Trophée EDF"	Liévin	France
22 Feb	ORLEN Copernicus Cup	Toruń	Poland
Silver Level Meetings (26)
16-17 Jan	USC Spirit National Pole Vault Summit	Reno	United States
18 Jan	CMCM Indoor Meeting	Luxembourg	Luxembourg
21 Jan	Tampere Indoor Meeting	Tampere	Finland
22 Jan	BAUHAUS-galan Indoor	Stockholm	Sweden
24 Jan	ISTAF Indoor Düsseldorf	Düsseldorf	Germany
25 Jan	Meeting de Paris Indoor	Paris	France
25 Jan	Orlen Cup Łódź	Łódź	Poland
30 Jan	Elite Indoor Track Miramas Meeting	Miramas	France
30-31 Jan	Perch'Xtrem	Caen	France
31 Jan	Gorzów Jump Festival	Wielkopolski	Poland
1 Feb	Meeting de L'Eure	Val-de-Reuil	France
7 Feb	Fly Athens Indoor	Athens	Greece
7 Feb	Hustopečské skákání	Hustopeče	Czech Republic
7 Feb	Perche en Or	Roubaix	France
8 Feb	Metz Meeting Moselle Athlélor	Metz	France
10 Feb	Beskyd bar	Třinec	Czech Republic
13-14 Feb	Tyson Invitational	Fayetteville	United States
14 Feb	Sound Invite	Salem	United States
14 Feb	International Tournament for the Prizes of Olga Rypakova	Ust-Kamenogorsk	Kazakhstan
21 Feb	Ocean Breeze Elite	New York City	United States
22 Feb	All Star Perche	Clermont-Ferrand	France
24 Feb	Banskobystrická latka	Banská Bystrica	Slovakia
25 Feb	Hvězdy v Nehvizdech	Nehvizdy	Czech Republic
6 Mar	ISTAF Indoor	Berlin	Germany
7 Mar	Perche Elite Tour Rouen	Rouen	France
12 Mar	Mondo Classic	Uppsala	Sweden
Bronze Level Meetings (14)
20 Jan	Aarhus SPRINT’n’JUMP	Århus	Denmark
23 Jan	Meeting Indoor Nantes Métropole	Nantes	France
24 Jan	Dr. Sander Invitational	New York City	United States
24 Jan	Meeting Indoor de Lyon	Lyon	France
24 Jan	Starpeche	Bordeaux	France
28 Jan	International Jump Meeting Cottbus	Cottbus	Germany
30-31 Jan	DeLoss Dodds Invitational	Manhattan	United States
31 Jan	Meeting Ciudad de Valencia	Valencia	Spain
4 Feb	Udin Jump Development	Udine	Italy
6 Feb	BKK Freundenburg High Jump Meeting	Weinheim	Germany
8 Feb	Sparkassen Indoor Meeting Dortmund	Dortmund	Germany
12-13 Feb	Memorial Josip Gasparac	Osijek	Croatia
14 Feb	Perche aux étoiles	Tremblay-en-France	France
Rejected	Indoor Meeting Apeldoorn	Apeldoorn	Netherlands
Challenger Level Meetings (35)
13 Dec	Romanian International Pole Vault Gala	Bucharest	Romania
3 Jan	Fana stavhoppgalla	Bergen	Norway
10 Jan	Penn Select	Philadelphia	United States
11 Jan	Stabhochsprung Stars 2026	Frauenfeld	Switzerland
17 Jan	Antequera Indoor Match	Antequera	Spain
17 Jan	Česká tyčka	Prague	Czech Republic
17 Jan	Kladerblad Internationaal Polsstokhooggala	Zoetermeer	Netherlands
17 Jan	Meeting de Saut en Hauter d'Hirson	Hirson	France
17 Jan	Memorial Alessio Giovannini	Ancona	Italy
23 Jan	Miting Catalunya	Sabadell	Spain
24 Jan	Inter Hallenmeeting	Chemnitz	Germany
24 Jan	Full Moon Jump	Göteborg	Sweden
24 Jan	Vinthundsvintern	Sollentuna	Sweden
25 Jan	Meeting Moniz Pereira	Pombal	Portugal
31 Jan	International High Jump Gala Elmos	Herentals	Belgium
31 Jan	IFAM Gent Indoor	Gent	Belgium
31 Jan	Indoor High Jump	Lucca	Italy
31 Jan	Nordhausen Indoor Kugelstossen	Nordhausen	Germany
31 Jan	Meeting Indoor de Limoges	Limoges	France
31 Jan	scottishathletics EAP Indoor Invitational	Glasgow	Great Britain
1 Feb	Rochlitz Shot Put Meeting	Rochlitz	Germany
4 Feb	IFAM Louvain-La-Neuve Indoor	Louvain-La-Neuve	Belgium
7 Feb	Cosma Cup Challenger	Kaunas	Lithuania
12 Feb	Indoor Spike	Ostrava	Czech Republic
13 Feb	13. Erfurt Indoor 2026	Erfurt	Germany
14 Feb	Bannister Winter Classic	Göteborg	Sweden
15 Feb	Aadax Locked-In	Göteborg	Sweden
21 Feb	Meeting Internacional de Ourense	Ourense	Spain
21 Feb	Vault Manchester	Manchester	Great Britain
26 Feb	Meeting Sudamericano Indoor Jurgen Berodt	Cochabamba	Bolivia
27-28 Feb	National Indoor Athletics Grand Prix - Jumping Events	Beijing	China
6-7 Mar	National Indoor Athletics Grand Prix 1	Xi'an	China
8 Mar	Air Loughborough	Loughborough	Great Britain
10-11 Mar	National Indoor Athletics Grand Prix 2	Chengdu	China
14 Mar	National Pole Vault Individual Meeting 1	Haining	China

== Gold Tour results ==
non World Indoor Tour events

=== Men's track ===
#	Meeting	60 m	400 m	800 m	1500 m	3000 m	60 m h
1	Boston	Ackeem Blake (JAM) 6.53	Khaleb McRae (USA) 45.38	Josh Hoey (USA) 1:42.50 WR	-	Cameron Myers (AUS) 7:27.57 AR	Trey Cunningham (USA) 7.48
2	New York	Ackeem Blake (JAM) 6.55	Cooper Lutkenhaus (USA) 1:14.15 (600 m)	Colin Sahlman (USA) 1:44.70	Cameron Myers (AUS) 3:47.54 (Mile)	Cole Hocker (USA) 8:07.31 (2 miles)	Cordell Tinch (USA) 7.52
3	Ostrava	-	Attila Molnár (HUN) 45.01 AR	Eliott Crestan (BEL) 1:43.83	-	Isaac Nader (POR) 7:38.05	Jakub Szymański (POL) 7:48
4	Madrid	Ali Al Balushi (OMA) 6.53	-	Mohamed Attaoui (ESP) 2:14.53 (1000 m) AR	-	Tshepo Tshite (RSA) 7:39.11	Enrique Llopis (ESP) 7.49
5	Karlsruhe	Emmanuel Eseme (CMR) 6.53	-	Alexander Stepanov (GER) 1:46.17	Azeddine Habz (FRA) 3:33.36	Stefan Nillessen (NED) 7:38.48	-
6	Belgrade	Dominik Illovszky (HUN) 6.52	Jean-Paul Bredau (GER) 46.42	-	-	Tshepo Tshite (RSA) 7:50.87	Jakub Szymański (POL) 7.43
7	Liévin	-	-	Eliott Crestan (BEL) 1:43.91	Isaac Nader (POR) 3:32.44	Addisu Yihune (ETH) 7:33.58	Just Kwaou-Mathey (FRA); Enrique Llopis (ESP) 7.45
8	Toruń	-	-	Eliott Crestan (BEL) 1:44.07	Azeddine Habz (FRA) 3:32.56	-	Jakub Szymański (POL) 7.48
Overall		Ackeem Blake (JAM); 20 pts	-	Eliott Crestan (BEL); 30 pts	-	Tshepo Tshite (RSA); 27 pts	-

=== Men's field ===
#	Meeting	High jump	Long jump	Triple jump	Pole vault	Shot put
1	Boston	-	-	James Carter (USA) 16.32 m	-	-
2	New York	-	-	-	-	Rajindra Campbell (JAM) 21.77 m
3	Ostrava	-	Mattia Furlani (ITA) 8.30 m	-	-	Jordan Geist (USA) 22.04 m
4	Madrid	-	-	-	-	Jordan Geist (USA) 22.04 m
5	Karlsruhe	-	-	-	Sondre Guttormsen (NOR) 5.84 m	-
6	Belgrade	-	Bozhidar Saraboyukov (BUL) 8.45 m	-	-	Roger Steen (USA) 22.07 m
7	Liévin	-	-	Yasser Triki (ALG) 17.35 m	Emmanouil Karalis (GRE) 6.00 m	Leonardo Fabbri (ITA) 21.82 m
8	Toruń	-	-	-	Sondre Guttormsen (NOR) 5.85 m	Joe Kovacs (USA) 21.92 m
Overall		-	-	Yasser Triki (ALG); 10 pts	Sondre Guttormsen (NOR); 27 pts	Jordan Geist (USA); 27 pts

=== Women's track ===
#	Meeting	60 m	400 m	800 m	1500 m	3000 m	60 m h
1	Boston	Dina Asher-Smith (GBR) 7.08	Nicole Yeargin (GBR) 52.63	Roisin Willis (USA) 1:59.59	Dorcus Ewoi (KEN) 4:01.22	Elle St. Pierre (USA) 8:26.54	Danielle Williams (JAM) 7.87
2	New York	Dina Asher-Smith (GBR) 7.10	Roisin Willis (USA) 1:24.87 (600 m)	Tsige Duguma (ETH) 2:35.50 (1000 m)	Nikki Hiltz (USA) 4:19.64 (Mile)	Doris Lemngole (KEN) 8:31.39	Danielle Williams (JAM) 7.90
3	Ostrava	Zaynab Dosso (ITA) 7.09	Lieke Klaver (NED) 51.00	Nigist Getachew (ETH) 1:59.98	Birke Haylom (ETH) 4:00.62	-	Pia Skrzyszowska (POL) 7.80
4	Madrid	-	Lieke Klaver (NED) 51.26	Rocio Arroyo (ESP) 1:59.97	Birke Haylom (ETH) 4:02.37	-	Laëticia Bapté (FRA) 7.90
5	Karlsruhe	-	Bassant Hemida (EGY) 51.97	-	Georgia Hunter Bell (GBR) 4:00.04	Gabriela DeBues-Stafford (CAN) 8:35.94	Grace Stark (USA) 7.86
6	Belgrade	Zaynab Dosso (ITA) 7.02	-	Audrey Werro (SUI) 1:57.27 NR	Joceline Wind (SUI) 4:08.87	-	Ida Beiter Bomme (DEN) 7.96
7	Liévin	-	Emma Zapletalová (SVK) 51.40	Keely Hodgkinson (GBR) 1:54.87 WR	Georgia Hunter Bell (GBR) 4:00.21	Freweyni Hailu (ETH) 8:24.59	Devynne Charlton (BAH) 7.79
8	Toruń	Zaynab Dosso (ITA) 6.99	Emma Zapletalová (SVK) 50.90	Nigist Getachew (ETH) 1:59.32	Agathe Guillemot (FRA) 4:00.64	-	Devynne Charlton (BAH) 7.77
Overall		-	Lieke Klaver (NED); 27 pts	-	Birke Haylom (ETH); 27 pts	-	Devynne Charlton (BAH); 27 pts

=== Women's field ===
#	Meeting	High jump	Long jump	Triple jump	Pole vault	Shot put
1	Boston	-	Monae' Nichols (USA) 6.64 m	-	-	-
2	New York	-	-	-	Chloe Timberg (USA) 4.60 m	-
3	Ostrava	-	-	-	Tina Šutej (SLO) 4.70 m	-
4	Madrid	Charity Hufnagel (USA) 1.96 m	Agate de Sousa (POR) 6.97 m	-	-	-
5	Karlsruhe	Yaroslava Mahuchikh (UKR) 2.01 m	Larissa Iapichino (ITA) 6.84 m	-	-	-
6	Belgrade	Angelina Topić (SRB) 1.96 m	Milica Gardašević (SRB) 6.61 m	Ivana Španović (SRB) 14.27 m	-	-
7	Liévin	-	-	-	Tina Šutej (SLO) 4.70 m	-
8	Toruń	Maria Żodzik (POL) 1.98 m	Larissa Iapichino (ITA) 6.72 m	-	-	-
Overall		Maria Żodzik (POL); 17 pts	Larissa Iapichino (ITA); 20 pts	-	-	-
