= Edmund du Plessis =

South African athlete (born 2002)

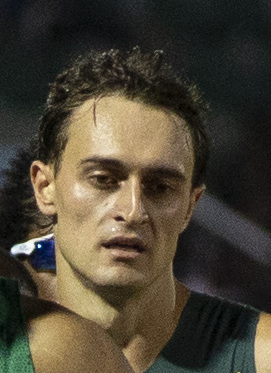
- Edmund du Plessis at the 2026 African Athletics Championships

Personal information
- Nationality: South African
- Born: 5 April 2002 (age 24)

Sport
- Sport: Athletics
- Event: Middle distance running

Achievements and titles
- Personal bests: 400m: 48.29 (Pretoria, 2024); 800m: 1:44.22 (Dublin, 2024); 1500m: 3:50.63 (Johannesburg, 2023)

Edmund du Plessis (born 5 April 2002) is a South African middle distance runner. In 2023 and 2024 he won national titles over 800 metres.

== Biography ==
Du Plessis won the 800 metres at the South African Athletics Championships in 2023 and 2024, setting a new lifetime best of 1:44.92 at the 2024 event. He also set a 48.29 400m personal best in 2024.

Du Plessis ran a time of 1:44.49 in Madrid in June 2024 to meet the Olympic qualifying standard. Du Plessis set an Irish all-comers record of 1:44.22 in the 800m at the Morton Games in Dublin in July 2024.

Du Plessis competed in the 800 metres at the 2024 Summer Olympics in Paris in August 2024, where he reached the semi-finals.

In April 2026, he won the 800 metres title at the South African Championships in Stellenbosch.

== Personal life ==
He studies medicine at the University of Pretoria.
