= Koitatoi Kidali =

Kenyan athlete (born 2003)

Personal information
- Nationality: Kenyan
- Born: 12 February 2003 (age 23) Namanga, Kajiado County, Kenya

Sport
- Sport: Athletics
- Event: Middle distance running

Achievements and titles
- Personal best(s): 800m: 1:42.66 (Nairobi, 2024)

Koitatoi Kidali (born 12 February 2003) is a Kenyan middle distance runner. He represented Kenya over 800 metres at the 2024 Olympic Games.

== Biography ==
Kidali was born in 2003 in Namanga, Kajiado County, the oldest of six children. He was a pupil at Engaboli Primary School in Maili Tisa, Kajiado South, before attending Natatai Secondary School. He trained with the school's football team as a winger, but was later coached in athletics by Nakeel Sylvester who encouraged his development in middle-distance running. He was runner-up over 800 metres at the Kenyan World U20 Trials in 2022, in a time of 1:46.32.

Kidali ran a personal best 1:42.66 for the 800 metres at the Kenyan Olympic trials in Nairobi in June 2024, placing third behind Emmanuel Wanyonyi and Wycliffe Kinyamal. He was subsequently named in the Kenyan team for the 2024 Paris Olympics, where he finished fifth in his heat and sixth in his repechage round without qualifying for the semi-final.

In August 2024, he was announced as joining the athletics team at the University of Oregon in the United States. He qualified for the final of the 800 metres at the 2025 NCAA Outdoor Championships, placing ninth overall.
