= Bartosz Kitliński =

Polish middle-distance runner (born 2004)

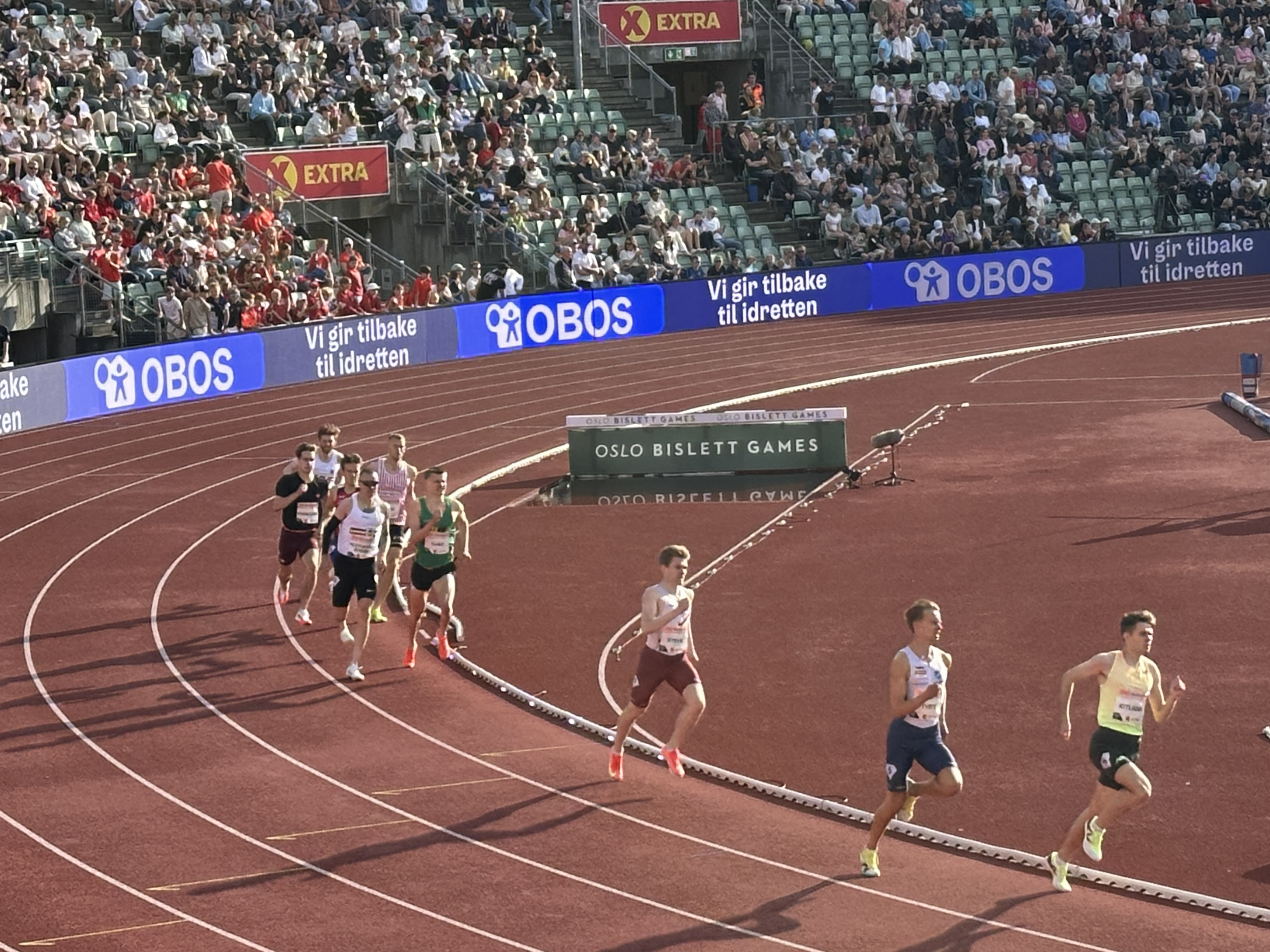
- Kitliński at 2025 Bislett Games

Personal information
- Born: 11 June 2004 (age 22)

Sport
- Sport: Athletics
- Event: Middle-distance running

Achievements and titles
- Personal bests: 400m: 47.89 (2025); 800m: 1:44.56 (2026); 1500m: 3:43.59 (2023); Indoors; 800m: 1:45.75 (2025) AU23R

Bartosz Kitliński (born 11 June 2004) is a Polish middle-distance runner. In 2025, he set a European under-23 indoor record for the 800 metres.

== Biography ==
He set a new European U23 indoor record in the 800 meters on 19 January 2025, during a meeting in Luxembourg, running a time of 1:45.75. He qualified for the semi-finals of the 800 metres at the 2025 European Athletics Indoor Championships in Apeldoorn in March 2025.

He lowered his personal best to 1:44.77 for the 800 metres in Montreuil, France in June 2025. Later that month, he raced for Poland at the 2025 European Athletics Team Championships in Madrid. In July, he was named in the Polish team for the 2025 European Athletics U23 Championships in Bergen.

In August 2026, he competed at the 2026 European Athletics Championships in Birmingham, England, in the 800 metres.

== Personal life ==
He is coached by his father Piotr. He attends Maria Curie-Skłodowska University in Lublin, Poland.
