= Max Burgin =

British runner (born 2002)

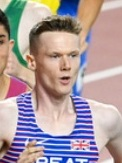
- Burgin in 2023

Personal information
- Nationality: British (English)
- Born: 20 May 2002 (age 24) Halifax, England

Sport
- Sport: Athletics
- Event: 800 metres
- Club: Halifax Harriers

Achievements and titles
- Personal bests: 800 m: 1:42.29 (Tokyo, 2025); 1500 m: 3:47.70 (Stretford, 2018)

Max Burgin (born 20 May 2002) is a British middle-distance runner specialising in the 800 metres. He competed at the 2024 Summer Olympics.

== Biography ==
In 2022 Burgin became the British 800 metres champion after winning the title at the 2022 British Athletics Championships in a time of 1:44.54. He ran a new personal best of 1:43.52 in Turku, Finland on 14 June 2022 at the Paavo Nurmi Games, which was the fourth fastest British 800 time in history. He also won the 800m at the 2018 European Athletics U18 Championships.

After winning the 800 metres silver medal at the 2024 British Athletics Championships, Burgin was subsequently named in the Great Britain team for the 2024 Summer Olympics in Paris. He came 8th in the 800m final after achieving a new personal best of 1:43.50 in the semi-final.

In May 2025 he lowered his personal best to 1:43.34 to finish second behind Tshepiso Masalela in the 800 metres race at the 2025 Meeting International Mohammed VI d'Athlétisme de Rabat, finishing ahead of Olympic champion Emmanuel Wanyonyi. In August 2025 he won his second British outdoor title at the 2025 UK Athletics Championships. He was a finalist at the 2025 World Athletics Championships in Tokyo, Japan, in September 2025 in the men's 800 metres, placing sixth overall in a new personal best time of 1:42.29. It was the first 800m race in history in which all eight competitors ran under 1:43.00.

In May 2026 returned to the Rabat stadium to win his first major Diamond League 800 metres, clocking 1:42.98 and beating Wanyonyi into a distant second.
