= Alexander Stepanov (runner) =

German middle-distance runner (born 2004)

Personal information
- Nationality: German
- Born: 30 September 2004 (age 21)

Sport
- Country: Germany
- Sport: Athletics
- Event: Middle-distance running

Achievements and titles
- Personal bests: 400 m: 46.85 (2025); 800 m: 1:44.17 (2025); Indoor; 800 m: 1:45.84 (2026)

Alexander Stepanov (born 30 September 2004) is a German middle-distance runner. He won the German Athletics Championships in 2025 over 800 metres and the German Indoor Athletics Championships over that distance in 2024.

== Early life ==
He is from Sindelfingen in Baden-Württemberg, and comes from a family of middle-distance runners. His father, Oleg, ran the 800 metres in 1:46.29 minutes in 1997 and his mother, Elvira, has a personal best of 2:01 for the distance. He would attend the training camps of his parents when he was younger and started middle-distance running himself in his teenage years.

== Career ==
A member of VfL Sindelfingen, he represented Germany at the 2023 European Athletics U20 Championships in Jerusalem, where he broke his previous personal best to finish in fifth place in the 800 metres. The following winter, he won the senior German Indoor Athletics Championships in Leipzig in February 2024, over 800 metres in 1:48.75.

He placed second in the 800 metres at the 2025 German Indoor Championships despite battling illness. In May 2025, he lowered his personal best for the 800 metres to 1:46.25 whilst competing in Karlsruhe. The following month, he set a personal best again for the 800 metres of 1:44.17 whilst competing in Pfungstadt which met the auto-qualifying standard for the upcoming World Championship. It was also the best time set by a German middle-distance runner in more than 20 years, and placed him seventh on the German all-time list.

He competed for Germany at the 2025 European Athletics Team Championships First Division in the 800 metres in Madrid, Spain, running 1:45.82. He qualified for the final of the 2025 European Athletics U23 Championships in Bergen, Norway, placing sixth overall in a time of 1:45.32.

He won the German Athletics Championships in Leipzig in August 2025, over 800 metres, in 1:48.69. He competed at the 2025 World Athletics Championships in Tokyo, Japan, in September 2025 in the men's 800 metres.

In February 2026, he ran 800 m in an indoors personal best of 1:46.17 to win in Karlsruhe, before improving it that month in Liévin, France, to 1:45.89. He then ran a new personal best of 1:45.84 to secure a gun-to-tape victory at the German Indoor Athletics Championships in Dortmund. In March 2026, he was selected for the 2026 World Athletics Indoor Championships in Poland and placed fifth in his heat in a time of 1:46.75, missing out on a non-automatic qualifier spot by 17 hundredths of a second. In August, he competed at the 2026 European Athletics Championships in Birmingham, England, in the 800 metres, reaching the semi-finals.
