= Ole Jakob Solbu =

Norwegian athlete (born 2003)

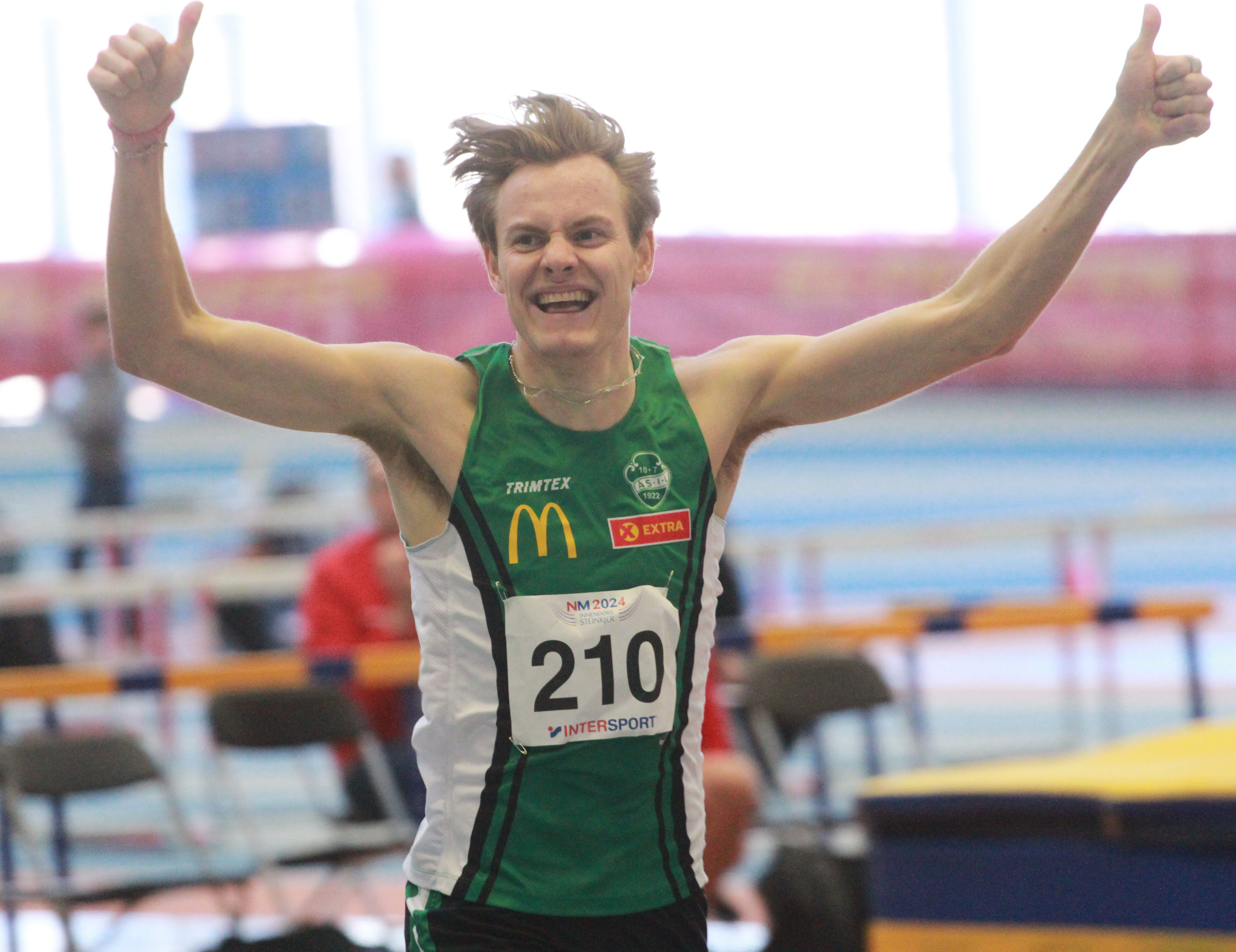
- 2024 by Stein Langørgen

Personal information
- Nationality: Norwegian
- Born: 19 August 2003 (age 22)

Sport
- Sport: Athletics
- Event: Middle distance running

Achievements and titles
- Personal best(s): 800m: 1:45.55 (Belfast, 2024)

Ole Jakob Solbu (born 19 August 2003) is a Norwegian middle-distance runner. He is a multiple time national champion over 800 metres. He has competed at multiple major championships for Norway, including the 2023 World Athletics Championships.

== Career ==
He is from Ås, Akershus. He finished in fourth place in the final of the 800 metres at the 2021 European Athletics U20 Championships, in Tallinn, Estonia.

He won his first national title at the Norwegian Indoor Athletics Championships over 800 metres in February 2023. He competed at the 2023 European Athletics Indoor Championships in Istanbul, Turkey, but did not progress to the semi-finals.

He won the national 800 metres at the Bislett Games in Oslo in a time of 1:47.26 in June 2023. He won the Norwegian Athletics Championships over 800 metres outdoors in July 2023, running a time of 1:49.40. He competed at the 2023 European Athletics U23 Championships finishing eighth in the final held in Espoo, Finland, with a time of 1:51.73. He competed at the 2023 World Athletics Championships in Budapest, Hungary, where he led his heat at the half-way point before fading out of the qualifying positions

He won the Norwegian national indoor title over 800 metres in February 2024. He ran new a personal best time in May 2024 at the Belfast Milers Meet, running a time of 1:45.55 in Belfast, Northern Ireland. He qualified for the final in the 800 metres at the 2024 European Athletics Championships in Rome, Italy, in June 2024, finishing in eighth place overall.
