= Louey Ouerrat =

French long-distance runner

Personal information
- Born: 4 November 2004 (age 21) Épinal, France
- Height: 187 cm (6 ft 2 in)
- Weight: 72 kg (159 lb)

Sport
- Country: France
- Sport: Athletics
- Event: Middle-distance running
- Coached by: Bruno Gajer

Achievements and titles
- Personal bests: 800m: 1:43.57 (Bellinzona, 2026); Indoor; 400m: 47.16 (Nantes, 2025); 800m: 1:45.69 (Metz, 2026)

Louey Ouerrat (born 4 November 2004) is a French middle-distance runner. He was the French indoor national champion over 800 metres in 2025 and French outdoor champion over that distance 2026.

== Biography ==
From Épinal, in the Vosges department, he started in athletics as a 14 year-old. He is a member of Athletic Vosges Entente Clubs. Ouerrat ran the 1500 metres in 4:06.57 as a 15 year-old in 2020. In 2022, he placed third at the French Junior Championships. In 2023, he moved to second on the all-time French junior list, and placed fifth overall at the 2023 European Athletics U20 Championships despite being troubled by a calf injury.

In February 2024, he placed third at the senior 2024 French Indoor Athletics Championships. That summer, he won the French U23 title over 800 metres in Albi.

Ouerrat set a new French U23 indoor record for the 800 metres with a time of 1:46.08 in Metz in February 2025. Ouerrat then won the 2025 French Indoor Athletics Championships that month in Miramas, running 1:47.39. The following month, he represented France at the 2025 European Athletics Indoor Championships in Apeldoorn, Netherlands. Ouerrat ran a personal best of 1:45.47 for the 800 metres in Luxembourg in 2025. In August, he was a finalist over 800 metres at the 2025 French Athletics Championships. In September, Ouerrat won over 800 metres in a personal best time of 1:44.86 in Trier, Germany.

In Metz in February 2026, he ran an indoors personal best of 1:45.69 for the 800 metres. The time met the automatic qualifying standard for the 2026 World Indoor Championships. Ouerrat ran a personal best to win in a time of 1:43.80 for the 800 metres at the Meeting Nikaia on 13 June 2026, and placed sixth competing over 800 m in the 2026 Diamond League on 28 June at the 2026 Meeting de Paris. In July, he ran the 800 metres in 1:43.81 to place second at the Meeting Stanislas Nancy in France. On 10 July, he acted as a pacemaker as Emmanuel Wanyonyi ran a new world record time for 1000 metres at the 2026 Herculis Diamond League event in Monaco. On 25 July 2026, he won the 800 metres in a time of 1:44.91 at the 2026 French Championships. In August, he competed at the 2026 European Athletics Championships in Birmingham, England, in the 800 metres.
