= Musa Suliman =

Sudanese athlete (born 2004)

Personal information
- Nationality: Sudanese
- Born: 15 June 2004 (age 22) Muhajiriya, South Darfur, Sudan

Sport
- Sport: Athletics
- Event: Middle distance running

Achievements and titles
- Personal best(s): 800m: 1:48.77 (Bern, 2023)

Musa Haqqar al-Safi Suliman (Arabic: موسى حقار الصافي سليمان; born 15 June 2004) is a track and field athlete from Sudan.

== Early life ==
Born in Sudan, he moved to Cairo at the age of nine years-old and arrived in Switzerland in 2021 as a refugee.

== Career ==
He ran a personal best 800 metres time of 1:48.77 in Bern on 4 August 2023. He was included by the Olympic Refuge Foundation (ORF) as one of five new Refugee Athlete Scholarship-holders in April 2024. On 2 May 2024, he was announced as part of the Olympic Refugee Team selected for the Paris 2024 Games.

He was named for the Athlete Refugee Team for the 2025 World Athletics Championships in Tokyo, Japan, in September 2025, where he competed in the men's 800 metres.

== Achievements ==
=== Personal bests ===
Event	Time	Venue	Date
400 metres (short track)	51.14	Biel/Bienne Athletics Hallenmeeting, Switzerland	28 January 2023
800 metres (short track)	1:54.98	Nationales Hallenmeeting, Switzerland	4 February 2023
1000 metres	2:28.39	Swiss U20 Indoor Championships, Switzerland	26 February 2023
600 metres	1:18.59	Auffahrts-Meeting, Switzerland	18 May 2023
400 metres	48.56	Swiss U20 Club Championships, Switzerland	2 July 2023
800 metres	1:48.06	Nationales Abendsportfest - Pfungstadt, Germany	14 August 2024
