= Eliott Crestan =

Belgian runner

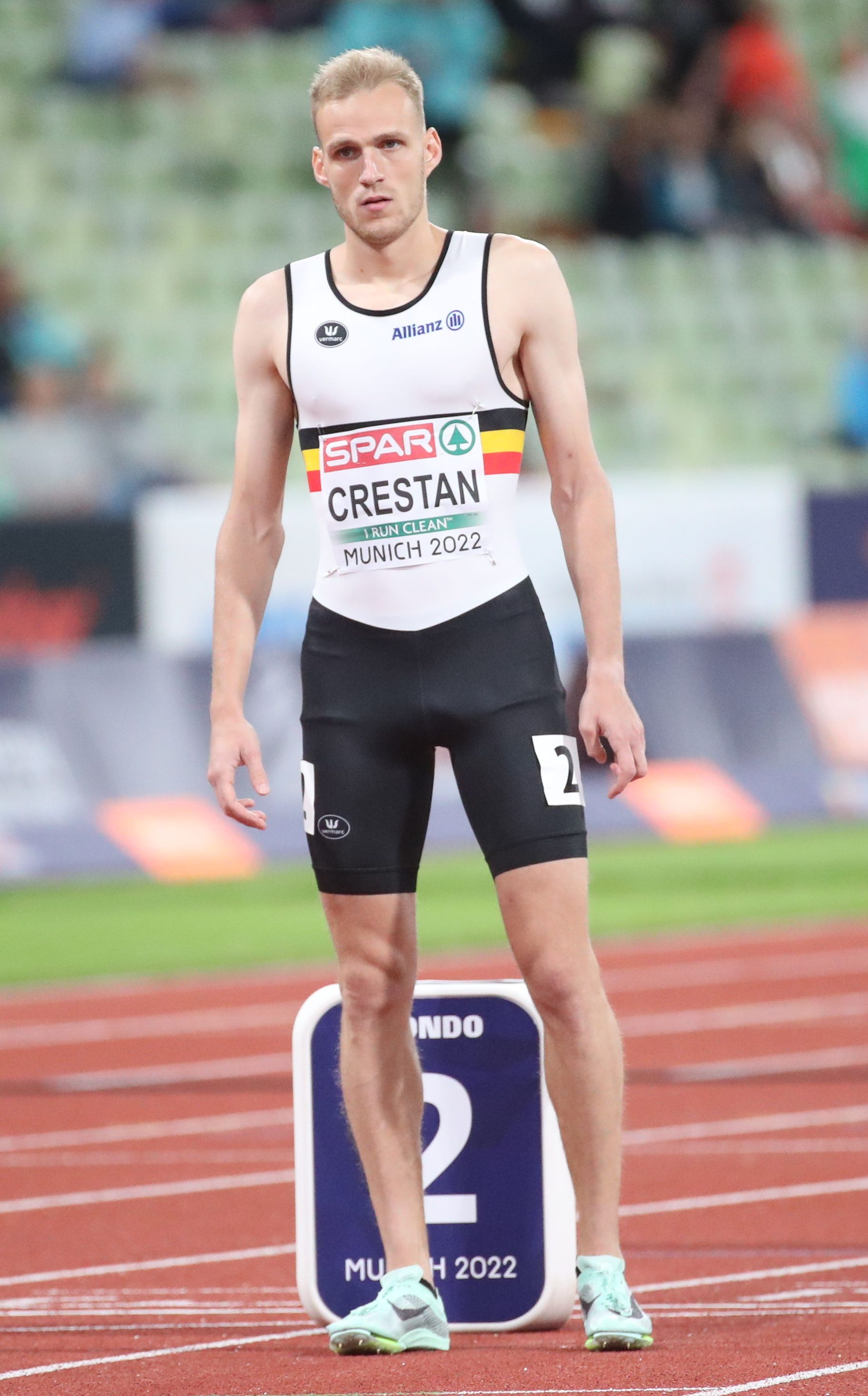
- Eliott Crestan in 2022

Personal information
- Born: 22 February 1999 (age 27) Namur, Belgium
- Height: 1.82 m (6 ft 0 in)

Sport
- Sport: Athletics
- Event: 800 metres
- Club: Sambre-Meuse Athlétique Club
- Coached by: André Mahy
Medal record
Men's Athletics
Representing Belgium
World Indoor Championships
Silver medal – second place	2025 Nanjing	800 m
Silver medal – second place	2026 Toruń	800 m
Bronze medal – third place	2024 Glasgow	800 m
European Indoor Championships
Silver medal – second place	2025 Apeldoorn	800 m
Bronze medal – third place	2023 Istanbul	800 metres
World U20 Championships
Bronze medal – third place	2018 Tampere	800 m
European Youth Olympic Festival
Silver medal – second place	2015 Tbilisi	800 m

Eliott Crestan (born 22 February 1999) is a Belgian middle-distance runner specialising in the 800 metres. In this discipline, he won bronze medals at the 2018 World U20 Championships and the 2024 World Athletics Indoor Championships. In 2024, he broke Ivo Van Damme's 800 metres national record that had stood for 48 years with a time of 1:42.43. He participated in the 2020 and 2024 Summer Olympics, reaching the semi-final stage in both. At the 2024 Summer Olympics in Paris in the men's 800 meters semifinals, Crestan ran the fastest non-final qualifying time in Olympic history of 1:43.72. In March 2025, he won a silver medal in the men's 800 metres at the 2025 European Athletics Indoor Championships in Apeldoorn, The Netherlands having led the entire race from the front before being pipped at the line by Dutch athlete Samuel Chapple. Two weeks later, he followed that up with a silver medal in the 800 metres at the 2025 World Athletics Indoor Championships in Nanjing, China. In early February 2026, at the Czech Indoor Gala leg of the 2026 World Athletics Indoor Gold Tour Crestan set a new Belgian indoor record for the 800 metres moving himself up to fourth on the world short track all-time list with his time of 1:43.83. Thanks to further wins on that tour in Liévin and Toruń, Crestan was the overall 800 metres winner of the 2026 World Athletics Indoor Gold Tour. In March 2026, he was selected for the 2026 World Athletics Indoor Championships in Toruń in Poland where, on 22 March, he won a silver medal in the men's 800 metres. In August in the immediate runup to the 2026 European Athletics Championships and having already travelled to Birmingham, England, he withdrew from the competition following a training session at Alexander Stadium suffering from a hamstring tear in his left thigh.

== International competitions ==
Year	Competition	Venue	Position	Event	Notes
Representing Belgium
2015	European Youth Olympic Festival	Tbilisi, Georgia	2nd	800 m	1:54.02
2016	European Youth Championships	Tbilisi, Georgia	7th	800 m	1:52.68
2017	European U20 Championships	Grosseto, Italy	11th (sf)	800 m	1:49.58
2018	World U20 Championships	Tampere, Finland	3rd	800 m	1:47.27
2018	European Championships	Berlin, Germany	12th (h)	800 m	1:47.35
2021	European Indoor Championships	Toruń, Poland	11th (sf)	800 m	1:48.12
2021	Olympic Games	Tokyo, Japan	13th (sf)	800 m	1:44.84
2022	World Indoor Championships	Belgrade, Serbia	6th	800 m	1:46.78
2022	World Championships	Eugene, United States	24th (h)	800 m	1:46.61
2022	European Championships	Munich, Germany	8th	800 m	1:45.68
2023	European Indoor Championships	Istanbul, Turkey	3rd	800 m	1:47.65
2024	World Indoor Championships	Glasgow, Scotland	3rd	800 m	1:45.32
2024	European Championships	Rome, Italy	22nd (h)	800 m	1:46.48
2024	Olympic Games	Paris, France	9th (sf)	800 m	1:43.72
2025	European Indoor Championships	Apeldoorn, The Netherlands	2nd	800 m	1:44.92
2025	World Indoor Championships	Nanjing, China	2nd	800 m	1:44.81
2025	World Championships	Tokyo, Japan	14th (sf)	800 m	1:44.56
2026	World Indoor Championships	Toruń, Poland	2nd	800 m	1:44.38
2026	World Ultimate Championship	Budapest, Hungary	8th	800 m	1:43.14

== Personal bests ==
Outdoor

- 400 metres – 46.79 (Cergy-Pontoise 2024)
- 600 metres - 1:14.47 (Liège)
- 800 metres – 1:42.43 NR (Paris 2024)
- 1500 metres – 3:46.44 (Louvain-la-Neuve 2020)

Indoor

- 400 metres – 47.58 (Louvain-la-Neuve 2023)
- 600 metres - 1:14:92 ABP NBP (Louvain-La-Neuve 2025)
- 800 metres – 1:43.83 (Ostrava 2026)
- 1500 metres – 3:46.44 (Louvain-La-Neuve 2020)
