= Gabriel Tual =

French runner (born 1998)

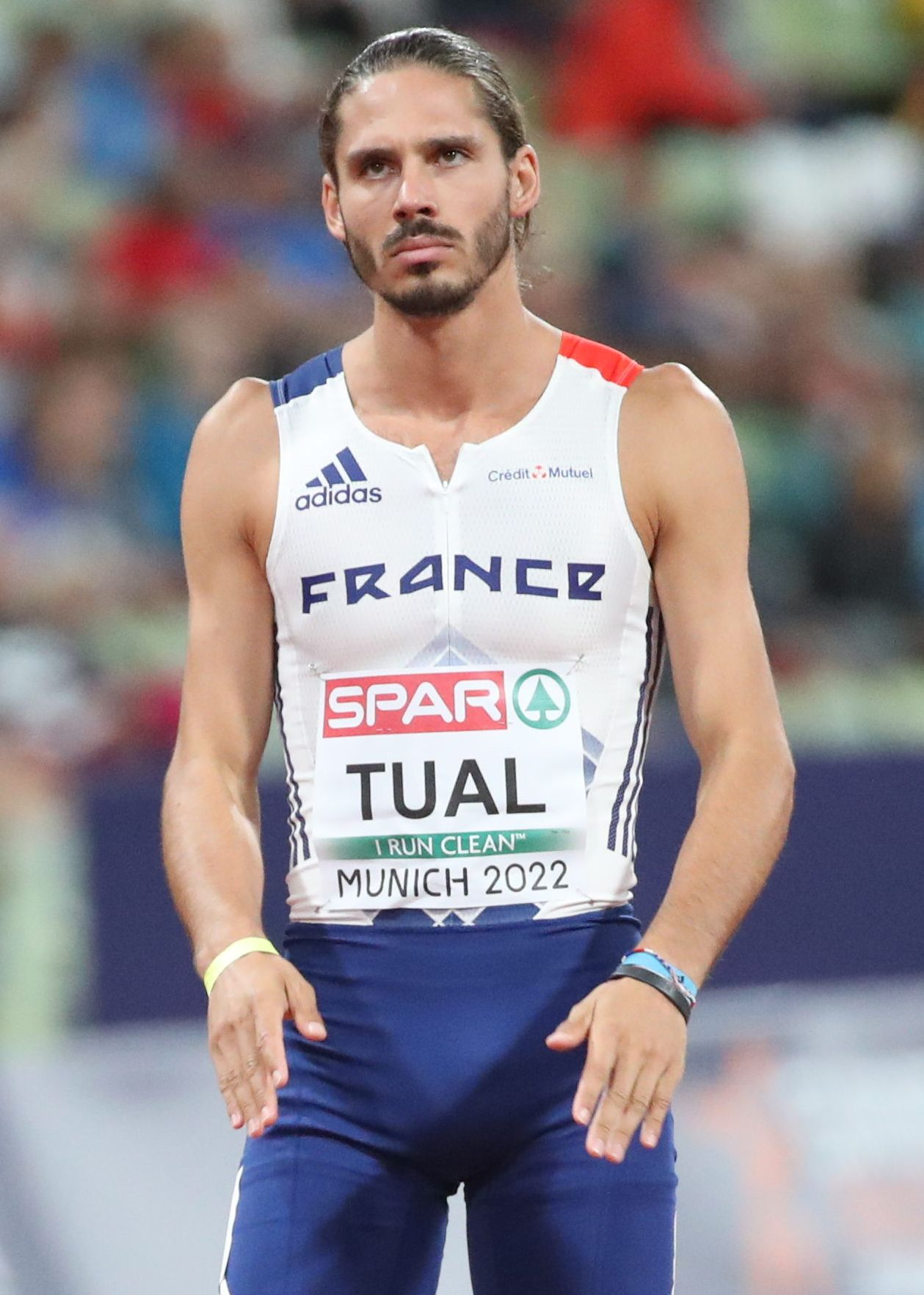
- Gabriel Tual, 2022

Personal information
- Born: 9 April 1998 (age 28) Villeneuve-sur-Lot, France
- Height: 1.82 m (6 ft 0 in)

Sport
- Sport: Athletics
- Event: 800 metres
- Club: Us Talence
Medal record
Men's athletics
Representing France
Event	1st	2nd	3rd
European Championships	1	0	0
Total	1	0	0
European Championships
Gold medal – first place	2024 Rome	800 m

Gabriel Tual (born 9 April 1998) is a French middle-distance runner specialising in the 800 metres.

At the 2020 Summer Olympics in Tokyo, Japan, after making it through the 800m preliminaries running 1:45.63, Tual ran 1:44.28 in the semifinals on 1 August 2021. This qualified him to compete in the 800 metres final at the 2020 Summer Olympics, where he finished 7th in 1:46.03.

During the 2024 European Athletics Championships, on 9 June 2024, he became the European Champion in the 800 metres, becoming the first Frenchman to achieve this feat.

Tual's personal best is 1:41.61, which he achieved at the 2024 Meeting de Paris on 7 July, which places him as the sixth‑fastest man and the second‑fastest European in the two lap race. Ahead of Tual in this race was Kenya's Emmanuel Wanyonyi, who ran 1:41.58, and Algeria's Djamel Sedjati, who ran 1:41.56.

At the 2024 Olympic Games, Tual finished sixth in the 800 metres final, with a time of 1:42.14.

== Personal bests ==
Outdoor

- 800 metres – 1:41.61 (Paris 2024) NR
- 1500 metres – 3:52.12 (Lormont 2019)

Indoor

- 800 metres – 1:47.54 (Miramas 2021)
- 1500 metres – 3:56.23 (Bordeaux 2018)
