= Corentin Le Clezio =

French athlete (born 1999)

Corentin le Clezio
Personal information
- Born: 24 September 1999 (age 27) Amiens, France
- Height: 178 cm (5 ft 10 in)
- Weight: 65 kg (143 lb)

Sport
- Country: France
- Sport: Athletics
- Event: Middle distance running

Achievements and titles
- Personal best: 800m: 1:43.80 (2026)
Medal record
Men's athletics
Representing France
Summer World University Games
Silver medal – second place	2021 Chengdu	800 m

Corentin Le Clezio (born 24 September 1999) is a French middle distance runner. He competed over 800 metres at the 2024 Paris Olympics.

== Early life ==
He is from Beauvais in the Oise département, in the Hauts-de-France region. He also spent time in his childhood in Saint-Caradec in Brittany. He was a keen handball player in his youth and only took up athletics in 2017. He was educated in Cergy-Pontoise. He graduated with a master’s degree in sports management and in training and optimization of sports performance, in 2023.

== Career ==
He had a world ranking of 600 for the 800 metres in 2022. In July 2023, whilst competing for Cergy-Pontoise athletics club, he improved his personal best for the 800 metres to 1:45.61 at the MNEL (Meeting National de l'Est Lyonnais). This was a three-second improvement from his previous best of 1:48.91. Following this, he hired Vincent Guyot as his coach with the aim to qualify for the upcoming Olympic Games, held in his native France. He was a silver medalist over 800 metres at the delayed 2021 Summer World University Games in Chengdu, China, in August 2023.

He met the minimum Olympic standard whilst running in Vienna on 22 June 2024, running 1:44.25. He finished third at the French Athletics Championships in Angers in June 2024. He competed in the 800 metres race at the 2024 Paris Olympics, placing fourth in his qualifying heat. He then finished third in his heat in the repechage round, but did not qualify for the semi-finals.

He was selected for the 2025 European Athletics Indoor Championships in Appeldoorn, but did not reach the semi-finals of the 800 metres. In August 2025, he was runner-up to Yanis Meziane over 800 metres at the 2025 French Athletics Championships.

In Metz in February 2026, he ran an indoors personal best of 1:45.87 for the 800 metres. The time also met the automatic qualifying standard for the 2026 World Indoor Championships. He placed second in the 800 metres at the 2026 French Indoor Athletics Championships. He competed in the 800 m at the 2026 World Athletics Indoor Championships in Toruń, Poland in March 2026. On 25 July 2026, he placed fourth in the 800 metres at the 2026 French Championships. In August, he competed at the 2026 European Athletics Championships in Birmingham, England, in the 800 metres, reaching the final and placing seventh overall having improved his personal best to 1:43.80 in the semi-final.
