= Ryan Clarke (runner) =

Dutch athlete (born 1997)

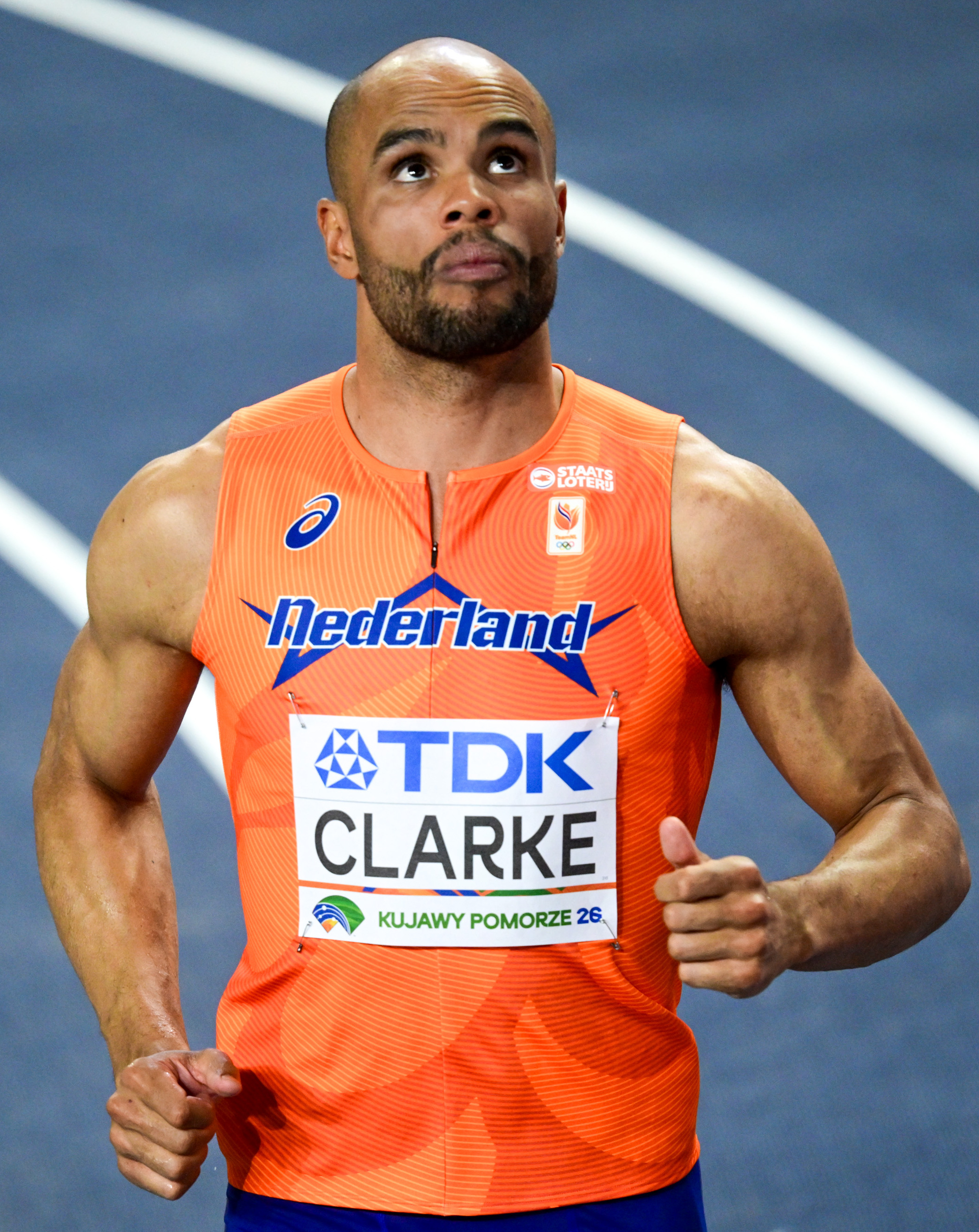
- Clarke in 2026

Personal information
- Nationality: Dutch
- Born: 17 November 1997 (age 28)

Sport
- Sport: Athletics
- Event: Middle distance

Achievements and titles
- Personal bests: 800m: 1:44.70 (Paris, 2024); Indoor; 800m: 1:44.72 (Boston, 2026) NR

Ryan Clarke (born 17 November 1997) is a Dutch middle-distance runner. He is a multiple time Dutch national champion over 800 metres. He has competed at multiple major championships, including the 2024 Olympic Games, and set a new Dutch indoor national record over 800 metres in January 2026.

== Biography ==
Clarke won the Dutch national 800 metres title at the Dutch Athletics Championships in Breda in July 2023, running a time of 1:45.74 to finish ahead of Niels Laros.

He won the Dutch Indoor Athletics Championships over 800 metres in February 2024. He subsequently ran at the 2024 World Athletics Indoor Championships in Glasgow, Scotland in March 2024, but did not progress to the final.

On 31 May 2024 he ran a personal best for the 800 metres of 1.44.83 in Oslo, Norway. He reached the semi finals of the 800 metres at the 2024 European Athletics Championships in Rome, Italy. Later that month, he retained his Dutch 800 metres national title in Hengelo, running 1:45.31, to finish ahead of Samuel Chapple. He competed in the 800 metres at the 2024 Olympic Games in Paris, France, in August 2024, where he ran a personal best of 1:44.70.

He was selected for the 2025 European Athletics Indoor Championships in Apeldoorn where he ran 1:45.65 to be the fastest equaliser for the 800 metres final. He briefly led in the final, but ultimately placed sixth overall. He was selected for the 2025 World Athletics Indoor Championships in Nanjing, China. Competing in the 800 metres at the Championships he finished last in his heat and did not progress to the semi-final.

He competed at the 2025 World Athletics Championships in Tokyo, Japan, in September 2025 in the men's 800 metres.

On 24 January 2026, Clarke ran new indoor national record of 1:44.72 for the 800 metres in Boston at the Indoor Grand Prix, finishing third as Josh Hoey broke the indoor world record. Clarke ran 1:49.68 to win the 800 metres at the 2026 Dutch Indoor Athletics Championships in Apeldoorn. He was selected for the 2026 World Athletics Indoor Championships in Poland in March 2026, but was affected by illness and did not advance from the heats of the 800 metres. In August, he competed at the 2026 European Athletics Championships in Birmingham, England, in the 800 metres, reaching the semi-finals.

== Personal life ==
He is from Castricum in North Holland. His girlfriend is Kim Wensveen.
