= Meeting Nikaïa =

Annual track and field competition

Coordinates: 43°40′42″N 7°11′52″E

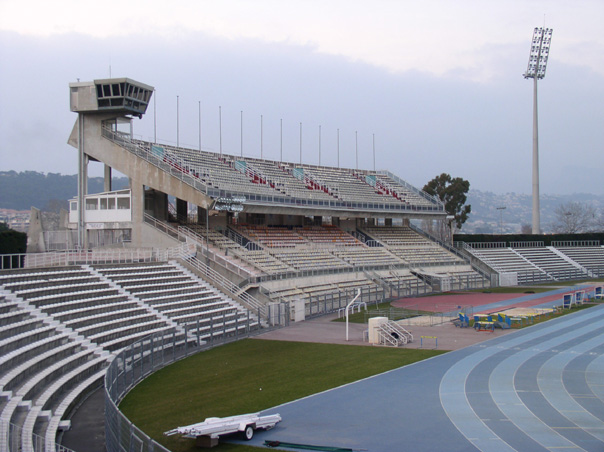
- The host stadium
- Date: June/July
- Location: Nice, France
- Event type: Track and field
- Established: 1976
- Website: meetingnikaia.com

The Meeting International de Nice, also known as the Meeting Nikaïa, is an annual one-day outdoor track and field meeting at the Stade Charles-Ehrmann in Nice, France. First held on 16 August 1976, it was held in June or July each year until 2001, when the meeting folded due to financial reasons. It was part of the IAAF Grand Prix circuit from 1998 to 2001. It was revived on 17 June 2023 as a Bronze-level World Athletics Continental Tour meeting.

The meeting was host to a world record in 1988, when Soviet athlete Sergey Bubka set a men's pole vault world record of 6.06 m (19 ft 10 1/2 in). The final edition in 2001 saw a world record of 9:25.31 in the women's 3000 metres steeplechase by Poland's Justyna Bąk and a European record in the women's pole vault with Svetlana Feofanova's clearance of 4.62 m (15 ft 1 3/4 in).
