= Francesco Pernici =

Italian middle-distance runner

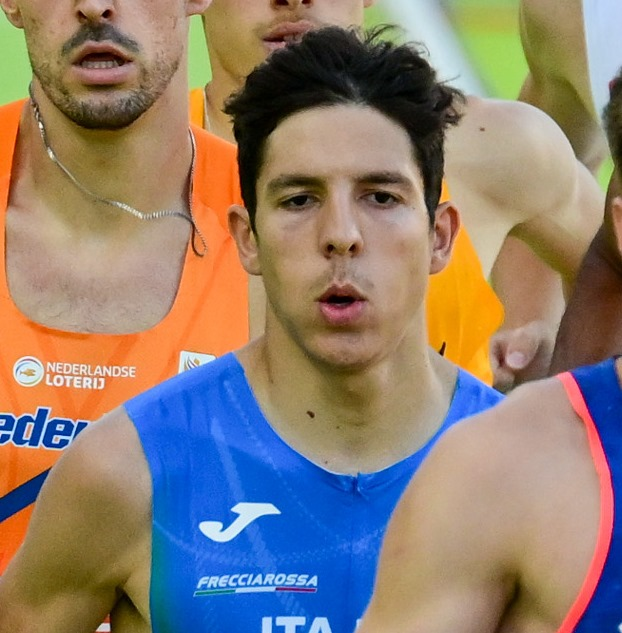
- Pernici at Madrid 2025

Personal information
- National team: Italian Team
- Born: 18 February 2003 (age 23) Esine, Italy
- Height: 1.78 m (5 ft 10 in)
- Weight: 59 kg (130 lb)

Sport
- Sport: Athletics
- Event: 800 m
- Club: G.S. Fiamme Gialle
- Coached by: Dalmazio Bersini

Achievements and titles
- Personal bests: 800 m: 1:42.67 (2026) NR
Medal record
Men's athletics
Representing Italy
European U20 Championships
Silver medal – second place	2021 Tallinn	4×400 m

Francesco Pernici (born 18 February 2003) is an Italian middle-distance runner.

== Career ==
In 2023 Pernici participated at the World Athletics Championships in Budapest.

== Achievements ==
Year	Competition	Venue	Rank	Event	Time	Notes
2023	World Championships	(Hungary) Budapest	Heats	800 m	1:45.89	
