= Jakub Dudycha =

Czech athlete (born 2005)

Personal information
- Nationality: Czech
- Born: 5 September 2005 (age 21)

Sport
- Sport: Athletics
- Event: 800m

Achievements and titles
- Personal bests: 800m: 1:44.48 (Ostrava, 2025) NR
Medal record
Men's athletics
Representing Czech Republic
European U20 Championships
Gold medal – first place	2023 Jerusalem	800m
European U18 Championships
Gold medal – first place	2022 Jerusalem	800m

Jakub Dudycha (born 5 September 2005) is a Czech middle-distance runner. He is Czech national record holder over 800 metres. He won Czech national titles in 2023 and 2024.

== Biography ==
Dudycha is from Vysoké Mýto. In 2022, he won the 800m at 2022 European Athletics U18 Championships in Jerusalem and reached the semi-finals of the Junior World Championships in Cali, Colombia. He set a personal best time of 1:48.58 at the Golden Spike event in Ostrava in June 2022.

He won the Czech Athletics Championships in Tábor in July 2023 over 800 metres. He won the European Athletics U20 Championships 800 metres race in Jerusalem, Israel, in August 2023. The following month, Dudycha broke the Czech junior record for 800 meters in Zagreb, running 1:45.84.

In Lyon, in February 2024, he improved his own junior indoor Czech record in the 800 meters with a time of 1:47.12.

He was selected for the European Athletics Championships in Rome, Italy, in 2024 and at the age of 18 years-old, ran a personal best time of 1:44.89 in the qualification heats, the third fastest time in Czech history. That month, he set a senior national record of 1:44.82 in Bydgoszcz. Later that month he retained his Czech national title. He competed in the 800 metres at the 2024 Summer Olympics in Paris in August 2024.

He was selected for the 2025 European Athletics Indoor Championships in Appeldoorn but did not reach the semi-finals. He was subsequently selected for the 2025 World Athletics Indoor Championships in Nanjing, China, in March 2025, where he qualified for the semi-finals but did not progress into the final. He set a new personal best for the 800 metres when he ran 1:44.48 at the Golden Spike Ostrava on 24 June. Later that month, he ran at the 2025 European Athletics Team Championships in Madrid, placing fourth in the 800 metres in the first division. He competed at the 2025 World Athletics Championships in Tokyo, Japan, in September 2025 in the men's 800 metres but did not advance from the heats and expressed frustration at the tactics he used in his race.

In August 2026, he competed at the 2026 European Athletics Championships in Birmingham, England, in the 800 metres.
