= Marino Bloudek =

Croatian middle-distance runner (born 1999)

Personal information
- Born: 26 April 1999 (age 27) Virovitica, Croatia

Sport
- Sport: Athletics
- Event: Middle-distance running

Achievements and titles
- Personal bests: 800 m: 1:44.01 (Madrid, 2025) NR; 1000 m: 2:17.02 (Zagreb, 2025) NR; 1500 m: 3:38.52 (Bydgoszcz, 2026) Indoors; 800 m: 1:45.27 (Ostrava, 2026) NR; 1000 m: 2:19.55 (Zagreb, 2025) NR; 1500 m: 3:37.77 (Valencia, 2026) NR
Medal record
Men's athletics
Representing Croatia
European Championships
Silver medal – second place	2026 Birmingham	800 m
European U20 Championships
Gold medal – first place	2017 Grosetto	800 m
Mediterranean Games
Bronze medal – third place	2026 Taranto	800 m

Marino Bloudek (born 18 July 1999) is a Croatian middle-distance runner. He is a European Championships silver medallist and a multiple-time national champion, holding the national record in both indoors and outdoors 800 metres.

== Biography ==
Bloudek was born in Virovitica on 18 July 1999.

Bloudek won the gold medal in the 800 metres at the 2017 European Athletics U20 Championships in Grosseto, Italy. He won the senior Croatian Indoors Athletics Championships in Zagreb in February 2018. He competed at the 2018 World Athletics U20 Championships in Tampere, Finland.

He won the Croatian Athletics Championships over 800 metres in 2021 in Karlovac. He competed at the 2021 European Team Championships. Bloudek became the national champion in 10 km road race in November 2022.

He competed at the 2023 World Athletics Championships in Budapest, and the 2024 European Athletics Championships in Rome, where he was a semi-finalist in the 800 metres.

He set a new Croatian national indoor record over 800 metres in Poland in February 2025, running 1:46.15. He was a semi-finalist at the 2025 European Athletics Indoor Championships in Apeldoorn, Netherlands in March 2025.

Competing in May 2025 over 800 metres in Bydgoszcz, Poland he set a new personal best of 1:44.74. On 10 June, he won the 800 metres at the International de Montreuil meeting, part of the World Athletics Continental Tour Bronze series, running a new personal best time of 1:44.56. He set a Croatian national record of 1:44.02 to finish in second place in the 800 metres at the Golden Spike Ostrava on 24 June. He won the 800 meters competing for Croatia at the 2025 European Athletics Team Championships Second Division in Maribor. He was a semi-finalist at the 2025 World Athletics Championships in Tokyo, Japan, in September 2025 in the men's 800 metres.

Bloudek set a new Croatian indoor national record of 1:45.27 for the 800 metres in Ostrava on 3 February 2026. Boudek won the 800 metres title at the 2026 Croatian Indoor Championships in Zagreb, running 1:48.49. He also ran 3:45.90 to win the 1500 metres at the championships. He was a finalist in the 800 m at the 2026 World Athletics Indoor Championships in Toruń, Poland in March 2026, placing fifth overall. In May, he competed in Poland again and won the 1500 m in a personal best of 3:38.52 at the Irena Szewińska Memorial. On 21 June, he ran 1:44.63 to place third in the 800 metres behind Niels Laros at the FBK Games in Hengelo, credited with the same time as the second-place finisher Samuel Chapple.

On 13 August 2026, Bloudek won the silver medal in 800 metres at the European Championships in Birmingham, England. Competing in the Diamond League at the 2026 Athletissima in Lausanne, Switzerland on 21 August 2026, he ran a season's best 1:44.21 to place sixth in the 800 metres. In September, he competed over 800 m at the inaugural World Ultimate Championship in Budapest.
