= Mark English (athlete) =

Irish middle-distance runner (born 1993)

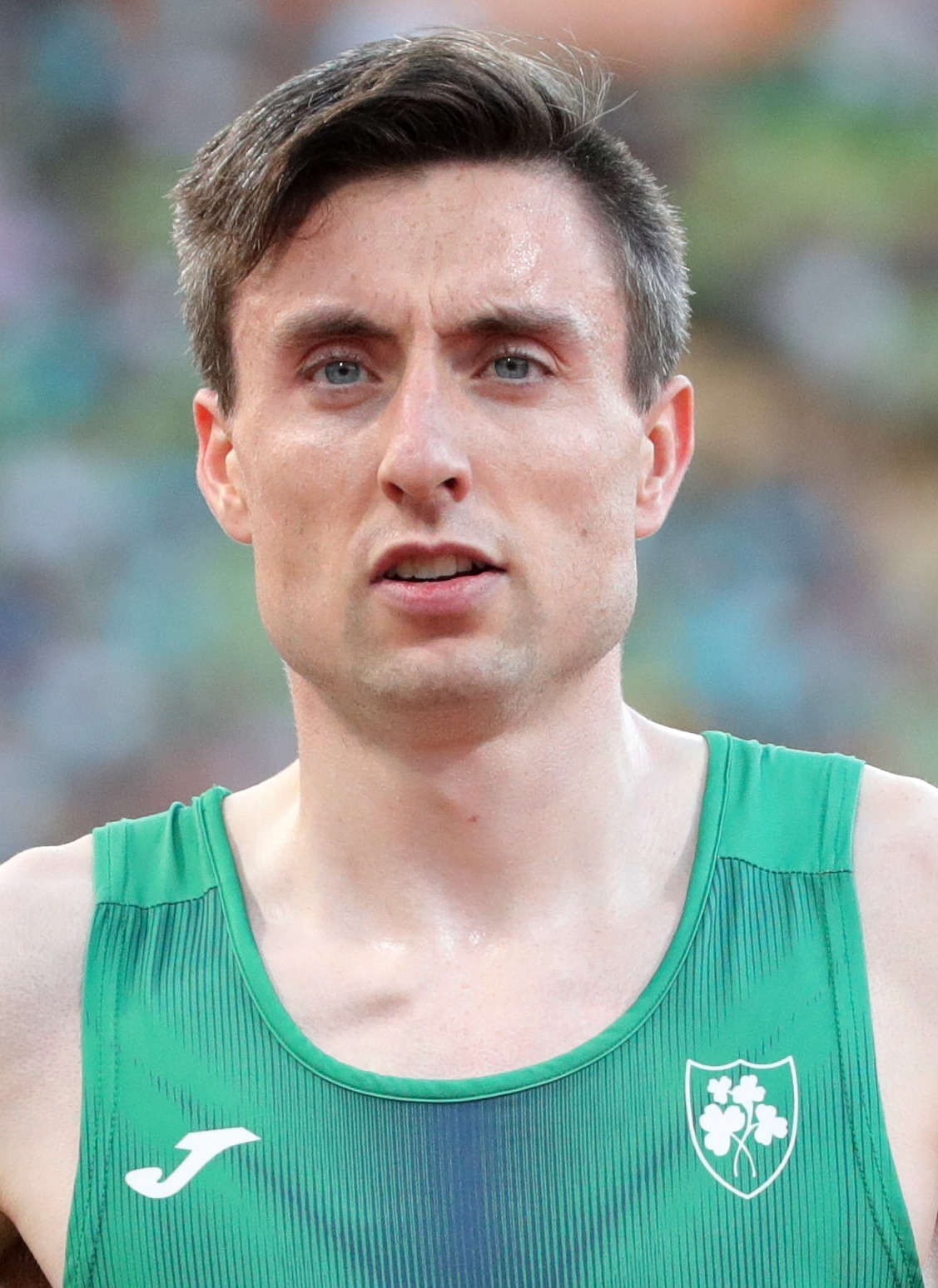
- Mark English, 2022 in Munich

Personal information
- Nationality: Irish
- Born: 18 March 1993 (age 33) Letterkenny, County Donegal, Ireland

Sport
- Sport: Track and field
- Event: 800 m

Achievements and titles
- Personal bests: 800 m (outdoor): 1:42.78 (2026); 800 m (indoor): 1:44.23 (2026) NR
Medal record
Men's athletics
Representing Ireland
European Championships
Gold medal – first place	2026 Birmingham	800 m
Bronze medal – third place	2014 Zürich	800 m
Bronze medal – third place	2022 Munich	800 m
European Indoor Championships
Silver medal – second place	2015 Prague	800 m
Bronze medal – third place	2019 Glasgow	800 m
Bronze medal – third place	2025 Apeldoorn	800 m
European Team Championships
Silver medal – second place	2019 Sandnes (First League)	800 m
Gold medal – first place	2017 Vaasa (First League)	800 m
Silver medal – second place	2015 Heraklion (First League)	800 m
Gold medal – first place	2014 Tallinn (First League)	800 m

Mark English (born 18 March 1993) is an Irish middle-distance runner. He is the Irish national record holder over 800 metres indoors and the 2026 European Champion in 800 metres, the first Irish male athlete to win an individual gold medal in the history of the Championships.

== Early life ==
English was born and raised in Letterkenny in County Donegal. His father is Dr Joe English, a lecturer in mathematics at Atlantic Technological University (ATU) in Letterkenny. Joe is from Gortlee in Letterkenny, and is the son of Superintendent Patrick ('Pat') English from Knockcroghery in County Roscommon, who was a senior-ranking member of An Garda Síochána, and his wife Eileen (née Egan), from Ballina in County Mayo. Pat English, Mark's paternal grandfather, moved to Letterkenny because of his job with An Garda Síochána. His paternal uncle is Kevin English, who also formerly served as a superintendent in An Garda Síochána and who later, following his retirement from the Garda, joined the senior staff of the Office of the Director of Public Prosecutions (Office of the DPP) in the Republic of Ireland. His mother, Brigid (née Burns), is a retired secondary school teacher from Portlaoise in County Laois. Her parents, Brendan and Mary ('Mai') Burns, owned a pub, The Slieve Bloom Inn, on the Main Street in Portlaoise. Mark attended secondary school at St Eunan's College. He only made the switch to athletics during his Transition Year, having previously played Gaelic football for Letterkenny Gaels at under-age level. While a member of Letterkenny Athletic Club in his teens, he tested himself against the Gaelic footballer Caolan Ward.

English studied medicine at University College Dublin (UCD), where his classmates included Dublin's multiple All-Ireland winning Gaelic footballer Jack McCaffrey—considered that sport's quickest player. English has issued a challenge to McCaffrey to take him on over 100 metres. After qualifying as a doctor in 2019, he initially intended to step aside from medical practice in order to focus on athletics full-time, but when the 2020 Olympics were postponed due to the COVID-19 pandemic, he took the opportunity to complete his 12-month medical internship.

== Career ==
At the 2014 European Athletics Championships, English won a bronze medal in the 800 metres event. On 8 March at the 2015 European Athletics Indoor Championships in Prague, English won a silver medal.

In 2014, English finished 2nd at the Adidas Grand Prix as part of the 2014 IAAF Diamond League. English finished 4th at the 2014 IAAF Continental Cup, representing Team Europe.

In 2015, he finished 9th at the 2015 World Championships in Beijing, China.

He represented Ireland at the 2016 Summer Olympics in Rio de Janeiro. Later that year, English ran the 2nd quickest of all-time for 500m at the Great CityGames, finishing 2nd to 2016 Olympic 800m winner David Rudisha.

On 3 March 2019, English won a bronze medal in the 800 metres at the 2019 European Athletics Indoor Championships. Following this, the RTÉ analyst Jerry Kiernan (himself a former athlete) described English as historically the country's "greatest talent" in middle-distance running. Several years earlier, Kiernan had claimed that English was better than Michael Murphy — the All-Ireland winning football team captain long held to be his county's greatest ever athlete. Kiernan justified this remark with the comment: "[Murphy] is playing against lads from Monaghan. Mark English is running against Kenyans".

In August 2019, English won the 800 m at the Birmingham 2019 Diamond League.

In August 2022, he won a bronze medal in the 800 m at the 2022 European Athletics Championships in Munich.

In March 2025, he won a bronze medal over 800 metres at the 2025 European Athletics Indoor Championships. In May 2025, he ran a new 800 metres national record of 1:44.34 at the World Athletics Continental Tour Gold meeting in Bydgoszcz.

In May 2026, he ran a meeting record of 1:43.85 to win on the Diamond League, moving from fifth to first in the final ten metres to catch Botswana's Kethobogile Haingura on the line at the 2026 Shanghai Diamond League.

On 13 August 2026, English won the 800 metres at the European Championships in Birmingham, England, becoming the first Irish man to win an individual gold medal in the history of the championships.

== Records achieved ==
=== 800 m Outdoor ===
On 29 June 2021, Mark English ran 1:44.71 to break David Matthews Irish record of 1:44.82, which had stood since 1995.

On 9 June 2025, English was the first Irishman to ever break 1:44 in the 800 m running 1:43.92, which he followed up with two more sub 1.44s and another national record of 1:43.37 on the 12th of August 2025.

=== 800 m Indoor ===
On 2 February 2014, English ran 1:46.82 to break Daniel Caulfield's Irish record of 1:47.21 which had stood since 2001.

As of November 2026, he is still the current Irish Indoor record holder with his time of 1:44.23 set the 3rd of February 2026. Holding the record for over 12 years now. This also placed him as the 11th fastest athlete in history, and 6th fastest ever in Europe.

=== 600 m Indoor ===
English broke his own 600 m Indoor Irish record with a time of 1:15:80 on the 15th of January 2026, the first Irish man to break 1:16 in the event.

== Other work ==
English has been active in encouraging people to read more books.
