= Emmanuel Wanyonyi =

Kenyan middle-distance runner (born 2004)

- Wanyonyi at the 2026 Weltklasse Zürich

Personal information
- Nationality: Kenyan
- Born: 1 August 2004 (age 22) Kapretwa, Trans-Nzoia County, Kenya
- Height: 1.70 m (5 ft 7 in)

Sport
- Country: Kenya
- Sport: Athletics
- Event: Middle-distance running

Achievements and titles
- Highest world ranking: 1st (800 m, 2023)
- Personal bests: 800 m: 1:41.11 (Lausanne 2024); 1000 m: 2:11.83 WR (Monaco 2026); 1500 m: 3:35.17 (Kingston 2025); Road Mile: 3:52.45 AR (Herzogenaurach 2025)
Medal record
Men's athletics
Representing Kenya
Olympic Games
| Gold medal – first place | 2024 Paris | 800 m |
World Championships
| Gold medal – first place | 2025 Tokyo | 800 m |
| Silver medal – second place | 2023 Budapest | 800 m |
Diamond League
| First place | 2023 | 800 m |
| First place | 2024 | 800 m |
| First place | 2025 | 800 m |
| First place | 2026 | 800 m |
World U20 Championships
| Gold medal – first place | 2021 Nairobi | 800 m |
World Cross Country Championships
| Gold medal – first place | 2023 Bathurst | Mixed relay |

Emmanuel Wanyonyi (born 1 August 2004) is a Kenyan middle-distance runner who specialises in the 800 metres. He won the gold medal in this event at the 2024 Summer Olympics and the 2025 World Championships, and holds the world record over the 1000 metres with a time of 2:11.83 set in 2026.

With his personal best of 1:41.11 set at the 2024 Lausanne Diamond League, Wanyonyi and Wilson Kipketer are tied for second place in the all-time 800 metre list, behind only Wanyonyi's compatriot David Rudisha, who holds the world record. Wanyonyi also briefly held the world record in the road mile, with a time of 3:54.56, from April 2024 to September 2024.

== Early and personal life ==
Wanyonyi is the fifth of twelve children. He has five brothers and six sisters, and is the only member of his family who runs. Due to insufficient funds, he dropped out of primary school at age 10 and worked as a cattle herder to help his family financially.

When Wanyonyi was 18, his father died, forcing his mother to move away with his younger siblings. Wanyonyi continued to run in his free time and was noticed by a teacher who convinced him to return to school. Wanoynyi's running ability caught the attention of Janeth Jepkosgei, who connected him with his current coach, Claudio Berardelli.

Wanyonyi is married to Nelly Chepchirchir. Their daughter was born on 4 June 2026.

== Career ==
=== 2021–2023 ===
Wanyonyi won the gold medal at the 2021 World Under-20 Championships, setting a championship record in the process. At the age of 18, he placed fourth at the 2022 World Athletics Championships.

At the 2023 World Athletics Championships in Budapest, Wanyonyi finished second to Marco Arop in the 800 metres, with a time of 1:44.53 while Arop ran 1:44.24.

=== 2024: 800 metres Olympic Champion ===
Wanyonyi broke the world record in the road mile with a time of 3:54.56 at the Adizero Road to Records event in Herzogenaurach, Germany, on 27 April. The previous record of 3:56.13 belonged to American athlete Hobbs Kessler, who finished second to Wanyonyi in a time of 3:56.18. Wanyonyi's record has since been broken by British athlete Elliot Giles, who ran 3:51.3 in September.

In June, Wanyonyi ran 1:41.70 to win the 800 metres at the Athletics Kenya Olympic Trials, making him then the 3rd-fastest performer ever over this event, behind Wilson Kipketer's 1:41.11 and David Rudisha's world record of 1:40.91.

On 7 July, at the Meeting de Paris, Wanyonyi came in second place to Djamel Sedjati in the 800 meters, running a personal best of 1:41.58 while Sedjati ran 1:41.56. At the time, this made Wanyonyi and Sedjati the fourth and third fastest 800 meter runners in history, respectively.

At the 2024 Summer Olympics, Wanyonyi won the gold medal in the 800 metres, in a time of 1:41.19, surpassing Djamel Sedjati to become the third fastest man in history at the distance, behind only compatriot David Rudisha and Danish athlete Wilson Kipketer. Only one hundredth of a second behind Wanyonyi was the 2023 800 metre World Champion Marco Arop, who set a new North, Central American, and Caribbean area record.

On 22 August, Wanyonyi lowered his 800-metre personal best by 0.08 seconds to 1:41.11 at the Lausanne Diamond League. This time tied Wilson Kipketer's 1997 personal best, making Wanyonyi and Kipketer tied for second place in the all-time 800 meter list, behind only David Rudisha.

=== 2025: 800 metres World Champion ===
On 5 April, at the 2025 Grand Slam Track Kingston meeting, Wanyonyi, competing as a challenger, won the 1500 metres over 2024 Olympic medalists Cole Hocker, Josh Kerr, and Yared Nuguse, in a time of 3:35.18. The next day, he finished second in the 800 metres behind Marco Arop. With 12 points earned in the 1500 metres and 8 points earned in the 800 metres, Wanyonyi was crowned the men's short distance Slam Champion of the meeting. On 26 April, Wanyonyi defended his title in the road mile at the Adizero Road to Records event, setting a new personal best of 3:52.45, which stands as the third fastest performance in history.

On 15 June, Wanyonyi ran a world lead of 1:41.95 in the Stockholm Diamond League. He improved his world lead to 1:41.44 at Herculis on 11 July. On 19 July, Wanyonyi won the London Athletics Meet in a time of 1:42.00. On 28 August, he won the Zürich Diamond League Final in 1:42.37.

On 20 September, Wanyonyi won the 800 metres at the 2025 World Championships in Tokyo, Japan, in a championship record time of 1:41.86.

=== 2026: 1000 metres world record ===
On 10 July, Wanyonyi broke Noah Ngeny's 27-year-old 1000 metres world record of 2:11.96 at the Monaco Diamond League, in a time of 2:11.83.

== Achievements ==
=== National competitions ===
| Year | Competition | Event | Time | Place | Ref |
|---|---|---|---|---|---|
| 2024 | Athletics Kenya Olympic Trials | 800 m | 1:41.70 | 1st | |

=== International competitions ===
| Year | Competition | Event | Time | Place | Ref |
|---|---|---|---|---|---|
| 2021 | World U20 Championships | 800 m | 1:43.76 CR | 1st | |
| 2022 | World Championships | 800 m | 1:44.54 | 4th | |
| 2023 | World Championships | 800 m | 1:44.53 | 2nd | |
| 2024 | Olympic Games | 800 m | 1:41.19 | 1st | |
| 2025 | World Championships | 800 m | 1:41.86 CR | 1st | |

=== Circuit wins ===
- Diamond League
  - 2022 (800 m): Rabat Diamond League
  - 2023 (800 m): Rabat Diamond League, Paris Diamond League, Xiamen Diamond League
  - 2024 (800 m): Marrakech Diamond League, Lausanne Diamond League, Brussels Diamond League Final
  - 2025 (800 m): Bislett Games, BAUHAUS-galan, Herculis, London Athletics Meet, Zürich Diamond League Final

==== Grand Slam Track ====
Grand Slam Track results
| Slam | Race group | Event | Pl. | Time | Prize money |
|---|---|---|---|---|---|
| 2025 Kingston Slam | Short distance | 1500 m | 1st | 3:35.18 | US$100,000 |
| 2025 Kingston Slam | Short distance | 800 m | 2nd | 1:46.44 | US$100,000 |
