= Tobias Grønstad =

Norwegian middle-distance runner

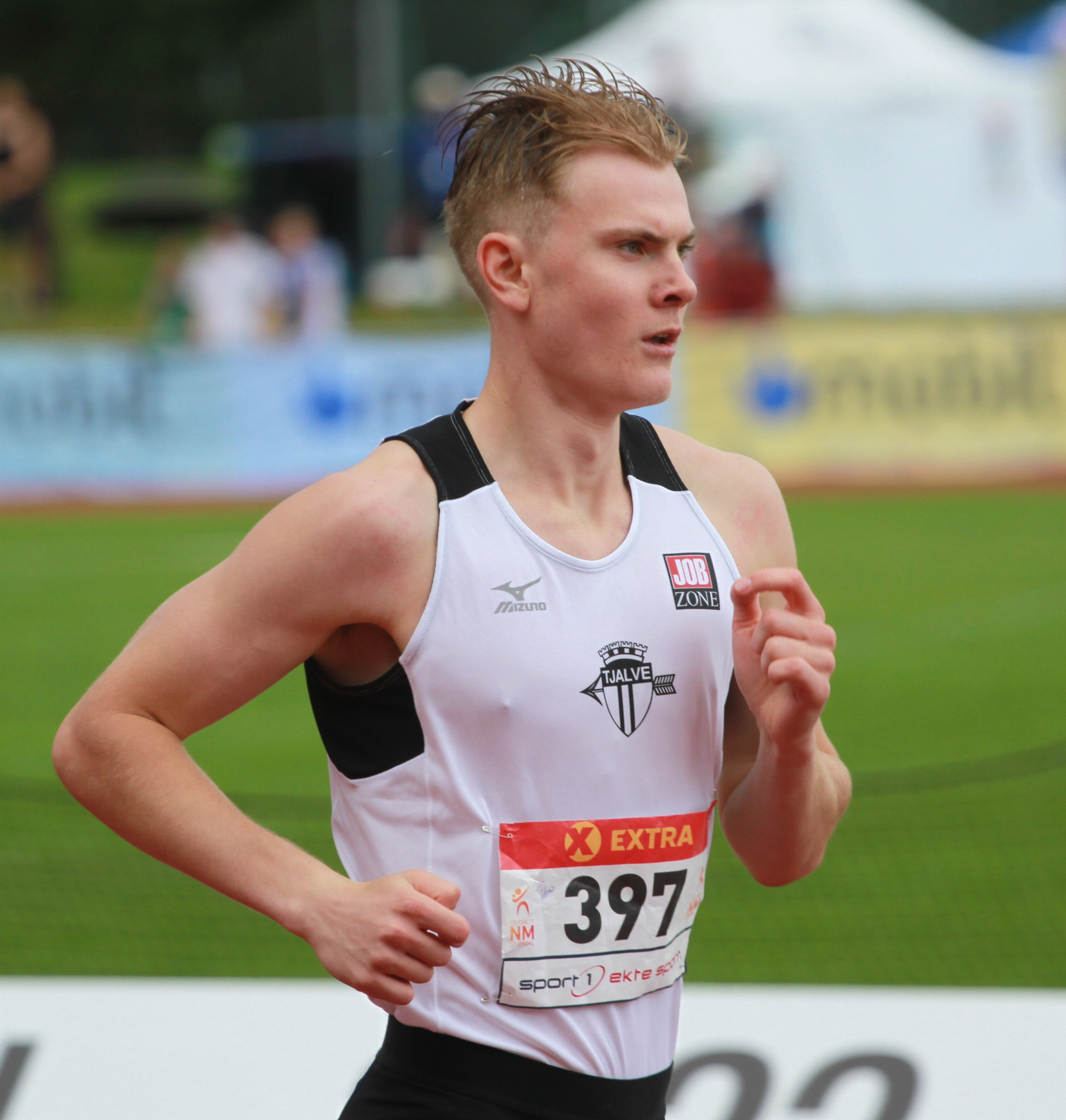
- Grønstad in 2022

Personal information
- Born: 6 July 2002 (age 24)

Sport
- Country: Norway
- Sport: Track and field
- Events: 800m, 1500m
- Club: IK Tjalve

Tobias Grønstad (born 6 July 2002) is a Norwegian middle-distance runner, who specializes in the 800 metres.

He won the 800 metres at the Norwegian Athletics Championships in 2021 and 2022.

Grønstad qualified for the 800 meters at the 2024 Summer Olympics with his time of 1:44.67, which he ran at the Bislett Games pre-programme in Oslo on 30 May 2024. He was also named to Norway's team for the 2024 European Athletics Championships in June.

== Personal bests ==
- 400 metres – indoor 47.55 (Bærum 2024)
- 600 meters – 1:14.56 (Pliezhausen 2024) NBP
  - 600 metres indoor – 1:17.34 (Bærum 2023)
- 800 meters – 1:44.67 (Oslo 2024)
  - 800 metres indoor – 1:47.38 (Bærum 2022)
- 1500 meters – 3:52.34 (Jessheim 2020)
