= Catalin Tecuceanu =

Italian runner (born 1999)

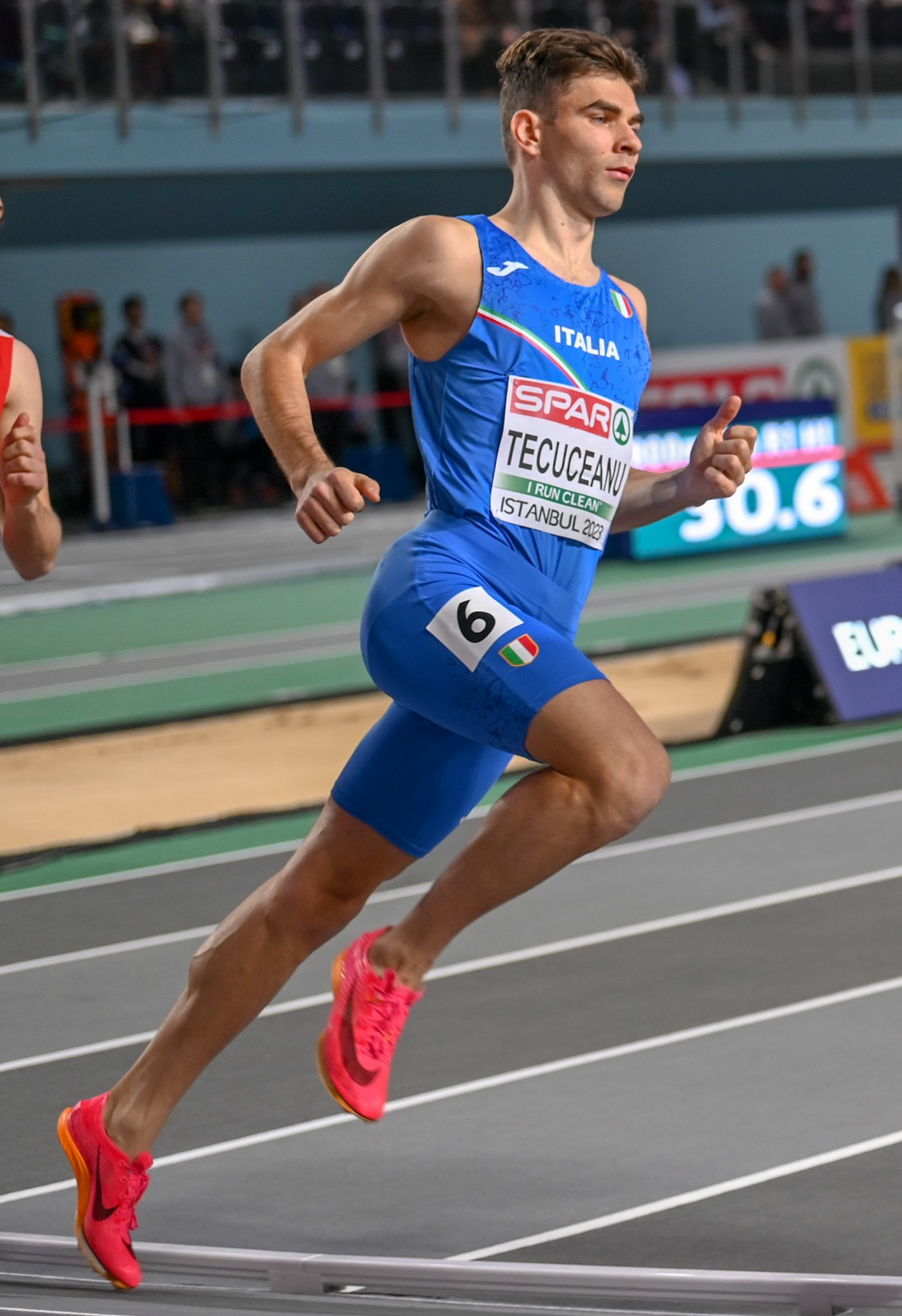
- Tecuceanu at Istanbul 2023

Personal information
- National team: Italy (2022–): 4 caps
- Born: Cătălin Tecuceanu; 9 September 1999 (age 27) Tecuci, Romania
- Height: 1.79 m (5 ft 10 in)
- Weight: 70 kg (154 lb)

Sport
- Sport: Athletics
- Event: 800 m
- Club: Fiamme Oro
- Coached by: Gianni Ghidini

Achievements and titles
- Personal best: 800 m: 1:43.75 (2024)
Medal record
Men's athletics
Representing Italy
European Championships
Bronze medal – third place	2024 Rome	800 m
Mediterranean Games
Bronze medal – third place	2022 Oran	800 m

Cătălin Tecuceanu (Romanian: [kətəˈlin tekuˈtʃe̯anu]; born 9 September 1999), commonly spelled Catalin Tecuceanu (Italian: [kataˈlin tekuˈtʃaːnu]), is a Romanian-born Italian middle-distance runner.

== Career ==
Tecuceanu arrived in Italy in 2008, joining his parents who were already there. In 2021, setting in Savona his personal best in the 800 m with 1:44.93, he also achieved the entry standard for the participation in the 2022 World Athletics Championships in Eugene, Oregon.

Italian citizen since November 2021, and eligible to represent Italy in national competitions from 9 March 2022, with a time of 1:45.24 on 800 m set in Ostrava he also established the 10th best Italian all-time performance over distance. His previous time of 1:44.93, established in 2021 in Zagreb, was a Romanian record as the athlete at that time could only represent Romania.

At Madrid, on 23 February 2024, he established a new Italian record on the indoor 800 m with 1:45.00.

== Statistics ==
=== National records ===
Romanian records

- 800 m: 1:44.93 ( (Croatia) Zagreb, 14 September 2021)

=== Achievements ===
Year	Competition	Venue	Rank	Event	Time	Notes
2022	Mediterranean Games	(Algeria) Oran	3rd	800 m	1:44.97	SB
2022	European Indoor Championships	(Serbia) Belgrade	Semi-finals	800 m	1:46.31	
2022	European Championships	(Germany) Munchen	Heats	800 m	1:47.94	
2023	European Indoor Championships	(Turkey) Istanbul	7th	800 m	1:48.54	(Note: He ran a better crono 1:47.24 in heats)

=== National titles ===
Tecuceanu has won 3 national championships.

- Italian Athletics Championships
  - 800 m: 2022
- Italian Indoor Athletics Championships
  - 800 m: 2022, 2023

== See also ==
- List of Romanian records in athletics
- Italian all-time top lists – 800 metres
