= Daniel Williams (runner) =

Australian middle-distance runner (born 2007)

Personal information
- Born: 3 August 2007 (age 19)

Sport
- Sport: Athletics
- Event: Middle-distance running

Achievements and titles
- Personal bests: 800m: 1:44.37 (Adelaide, 2026)
Medal record
Men's athletics
Representing Australia
World U20 Championships
Silver medal – second place	2026 Eugene	800 m

Daniel Williams (born 3 August 2007) is an Australian middle-distance runner who specialises in the 800 metres.

== Biography ==
From Coffs Harbour in New South Wales, he trained as a junior athlete under Andrew Rowlings. He mostly trained on grass with his nearest track three hours away. Williams won both the 800 metres and 1500 metres races at the 2023 Australian Athletics U18 Championships. On 7 June 2024, he ran a championship record 1:50.37 to win the 800 metres at the 2024 Oceania Athletics Championships in Suva, Fiji.

In April 2025, he was a finalist over 800 metres at the Australian Athletics Championships in Perth. In February 2026, he accepted a scholarship to attended Penn State University in the United States.

In March 2026, as an 18 year-old, Williams ran a personal best for the 800 metres of 1:44.37 at the Adelaide Invitational, winning ahead of Luke Boyes. That month, he placed second to Boyes at the Maurie Plant Meet in 1:46.16. Having qualified for the final of the 800 metres at the 2026 Australian Championships, he animated the race with an attack on the final lap of the race on 12 April, before being overtaken on the final straight by Peter Bol, Boyes and Bob Abdelrahim to place fourth. The following weekend, Williams won the Australian U20 national title in 1:46.94, a championship record time. Competing in Europe in June 2026, Williams won over 800 metres at the Czesław Cybulski Memorial in Poznań in 1:44.48 ahead of Giovanni Lazzaro of Italy and British runner Jack Higgins. In July, Williams ran 1:45.42 for sixth at the 2026 Prefontaine Classic. A week after, he ran 2:16.41 over 1000m at the Meeting International d'Athlétisme Herculis EBS and set a new Oceanian junior record. On 8 August, he won the silver medal in the 800 metres at the 2026 World Athletics U20 Championships in Eugene, USA, finishing in 1:45.36 behind Imad Bouchajda, who won Morocco’s first ever gold medal in the distance at the championships.
