= Ko Ochiai =

Japanese athlete (born 2006)

Personal information
- Born: 17 August 2006 (age 20)

Sport
- Sport: Athletics
- Event: Middle distance running

Achievements and titles
- Personal bests: 800 m: 1:43.45 (2026) NR; 1500 m: 3:44.18 (2025)
Medal record
Men's athletics
Representing Japan
Asian Games
Gold medal – first place	2026 Aichi–Nagoya	800 m
Asian Indoor Championships
Silver medal – second place	2026 Tanjijn	800 m
World U20 Championships
Bronze medal – third place	2024 Lima	800 m
Asian U20 Championships
Gold medal – first place	2024 Dubai	800 m

Ko Ochiai (born 17 August 2006) is a Japanese middle-distance runner. He was a bronze medalist over 800 metres at the 2024 World Athletics U20 Championships. That year, and in 2025, he won the senior Japanese Athletics Championships over 800 metres and is the national record holder.

== Biography ==
From Takashima in Shiga Prefecture, during his childhood Ochiai participated in various sports, but in junior high school he focused on track and field. He went on to attend Shiga Gakuen High School. In his second year of high school, he won the 800 metres final at the 2023 Inter-High School Championships and also placed sixth in the 1500 metres final.

=== 2024 ===
He won the 2024 Asian U20 Athletics Championships over 800 metres in Dubai in April 2024. He won the senior Japanese Athletics Championships title in June 2024 with a time of 1:46.56.

Later that year, he went into the 800 metres at the 2024 World Athletics U20 Championships as not only the Japanese and Asian under-20 champion, but the Japanese national record holder, having broken the record first in June 2024, with a time of 1:45.82, which he then lowered to 1:44.80 in July of that year. He proceeded to win the bronze medal in August 2024 at the Championships in Lima, Peru, finishing behind Ethiopian General Ayansa and Peyton Craig of Australia, in third place in a time of 1:47.03.

=== 2025 ===
He finished fifth over 800 metres at the 2025 Asian Athletics Championships in Gumi, South Korea, running 1:48.01, having been the fastest qualifier from the semi-finals in 1:46.24.

He retained his the senior Japanese Athletics Championships 800 metres title in June 2025 in Tokyo, winning with a time of 1:45.93. He competed for Japan at the 2025 Summer World University Games in Bochum, Germany in the 800 metres.

He competed at the 2025 World Athletics Championships in Tokyo, Japan, in September 2025 in the men's 800 metres.

=== 2026 ===
In February 2026, he won the silver medal in the 800 metres at the 2026 Asian Indoor Athletics Championships in Tianjin, China. In May, Ochiai ran a personal best 1:43.90 over 800 m at the Shizuoka International Meeting in Fukuroi. Competing at the Twolaps MDC Meet in Tokyo later that month, Ochiai ran a new personal best and Japanese national record of 1:43.45. He ran a 2:15.24 Japanese national record for the 1000 metres on 10 July at the 2026 Herculis event in Monaco. In September, he set a new Games record when winning the 800 metres gold medal at the 2026 Asian Games in Nagoya. He ran 1:44.48 to take close to a second off the previous Games record of 1:45.45 set by Sajjad Moradi in 2010.
