= Imad Bouchajda =

Moroccan middle-distance runner (born 2007)

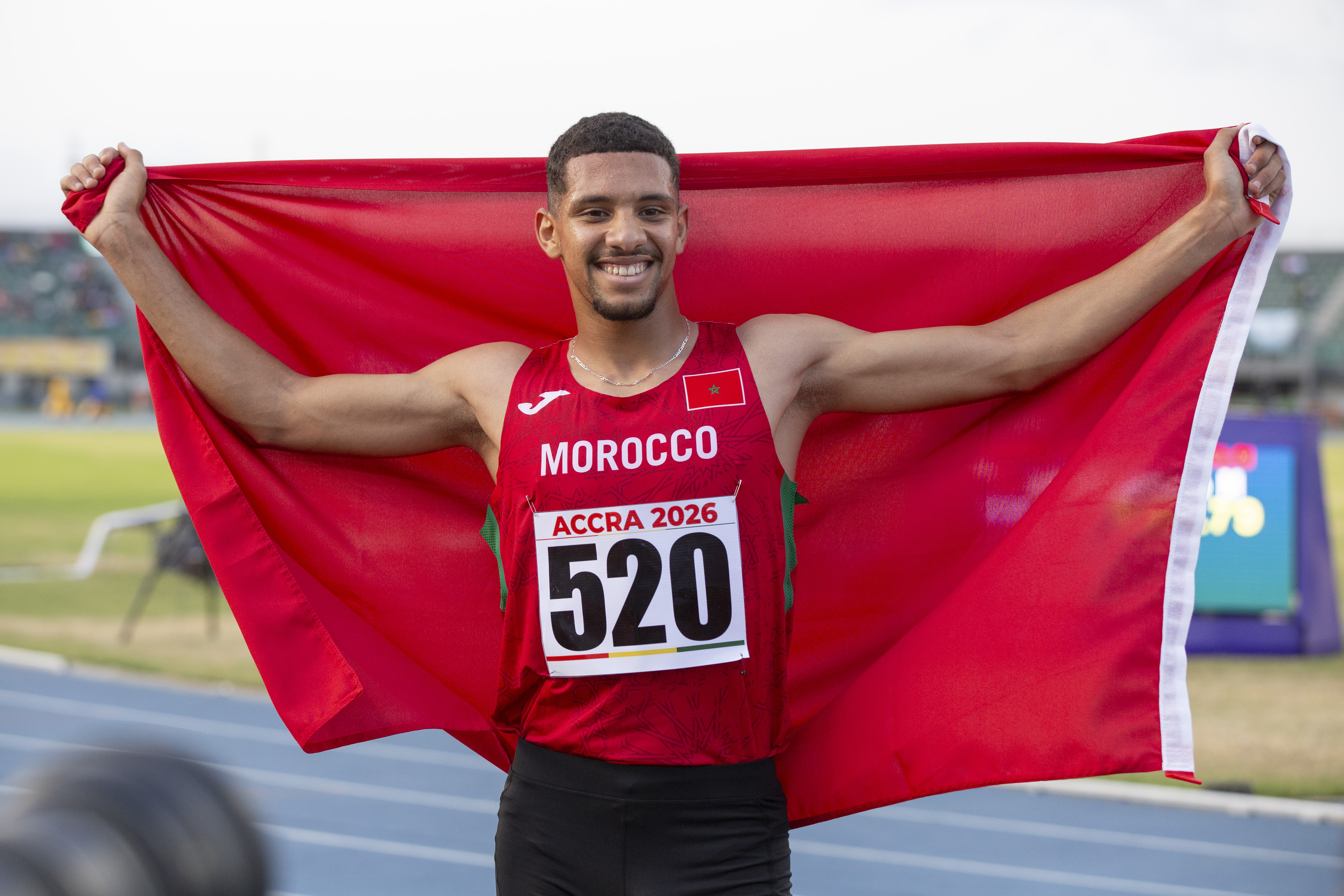
- At the 2026 African Championships

Personal information
- Born: 23 March 2007 (age 19)

Sport
- Sport: Athletics
- Event: Middle-distance running

Achievements and titles
- Personal bests: 800m: 1:45.15 (2026); 1500m: 3:45.27 (2026)
Medal record
Men's athletics
Representing Morocco
World U20 Championships
Gold medal – first place	2026 Eugene	800 m
African Championships
Silver medal – second place	2026 Accra	800 m
African U20 Championships
Gold medal – first place	2025 Abeokuta	800m

Imad Bouchajda (born 23 March 2007) is a Moroccan middle-distance runner. He was the silver medalist over 800 metres at the 2026 African Championships and the gold medalist at the 2026 World Athletics U20 Championships.

== Biography ==
In 2025, he won the 800 metres at the African U20 Championships in Abeokuta, Nigeria, with a time of 1:49.17.

In April 2026, he won the gold medal in the 800 metres and the silver medal in the 1500 metres at the Arab U20 Athletics Championships, in Tunis. In May, he won the silver medal in the 800 metres final at the 2026 African Championships in Athletics in Accra, Ghana, finishing behind Kelvin Loti of Kenya and ahead of home runner Alex Amankwah. Later that month, he ran a personal best 1:45.15 for the 800 metres at the 2026 Meeting International Mohammed VI d'Athlétisme de Rabat, part of the 2026 Diamond League.

On 8 August, he won the gold medal in the 800 metres at the 2026 World Athletics U20 Championships in Eugene, USA, winning in a sprint finish in 1:44.64 ahead of Daniel Williams of Australia. It marked Morocco's first ever gold medal in the distance at the championships.
