= Luke Boyes =

Australian athlete

Personal information
- Born: 5 November 2003 (age 22)

Sport
- Country: Australia
- Sport: Athletics
- Event: Middle distance running

Achievements and titles
- Personal bests: 800m: 1:44.16 (Shanghai, 2026)
Medal record
Men's athletics
Representing Australia
Commonwealth Games
Silver medal – second place	2026 Glasgow	800 m
Oceania Championships
Gold medal – first place	2026 Darwin	800 m
Silver medal – second place	2024 Suva	800 m

Luke Boyes (born 5 November 2003) is an Australian middle-distance runner. Competing over 800 metres he won the 2026 Oceania Athletics Championships and the silver medal at the 2026 Commonwealth Games.

== Biography ==
Boyes is from Glenbrook, New South Wales. He graduated from Penrith Selective High School in 2021, where he was a Prefect. While at school, Boyes participated in a variety of sports, and was awarded Sportsman of the Year in 2018, 2019, 2020 and 2021 as well as Distance Runner of the Year in 2019, 2020 and 2021. He is currently studying a Bachelor of Communication (Social and Political Sciences) and Bachelor of Laws at the University of Technology Sydney. He began to be coached by former Olympian and Australian 10,000m record holder Ben St Lawrence from the age of 15 years-old, and is a member of UTS Norths Athletics Club in Sydney. Prior to his track and field career, he was a keen all-round sportsman, participating in sports such as cricket, where he represented Penrith Cricket Club and Sydney University Cricket Club in NSW Premier Cricket, before focusing fully on athletics during the COVID-19 pandemic when team sports were paused. He declined offers to enter the collegiate system in the United States to stay and train with St Lawrence in his home state.

== Sporting Achievements ==
Boyes won the Australian Athletics Championships over 800 metres in Adelaide in April 2024 at the age of 20 years-old, beating Olympic finalist Peter Bol by 0.33 of a second to set a new championship record of 1:44.73. In June 2024, he won the silver medal at the 2024 Oceania Athletics Championships in Suva, Fiji over 800 metres finishing behind Australian compatriot Peyton Craig by six hundredths of a second.

In April 2025, he placed third over 800 metres at the Australian Athletics Championships in Perth behind Bol and Craig, running a personal best 1:44.50 as Bol set a new Australian national record in a highly competitive race, with all three meeting the automatic qualifying standard for the upcoming World Championships. He competed at the 2025 World Athletics Championships in Tokyo, Japan, in September 2025 in the men's 800 metres, where he placed sixth in his heat.

Boyes ran 1:45.12 to finish behind training partners Bol and Bob Abdelrahim in the 800 metres at the Perth Track Classic in February 2025. The following month, he ran a personal best 1:44.38 at the Adelaide Invitational finishing runner-up to Daniel Williams. Also in March, he won the 800 metres ahead of Williams at the Maurie Plant Meet in 1:45.21. On 12 April, he was runner-up to Bol in the 800 metres final at the 2026 Australian Championships. Making his Diamond League debut the following month at the 2026 Shanghai Diamond League, he finished in fourth place in the 800 metres with a new personal best of 1:44.16. He was selected as part of the Australian team to compete at the 2026 Oceania Athletics Championships, winning the gold medal in Darwin, Northern Territory on 21 May. On 1 August, he won the silver medal behind Navasky Anderson of Jamaica in the 800 metres at the 2026 Commonwealth Games in Glasgow, Scotland. In the semi-final, he ran the fastest time by an Australian in the 800m at the Commonwealth Games to date.
