= Tiarnan Crorken =

British middle-distance runner (born 1999)

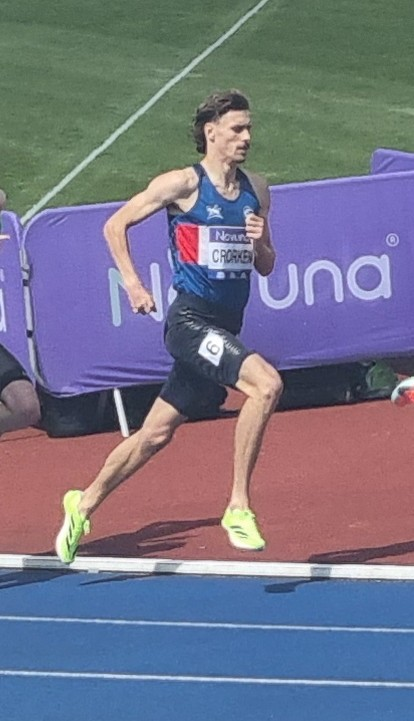
- 2025 UK Athletics Championships

Personal information
- Nationality: British
- Born: 13 June 1999 (age 27)

Sport
- Sport: Athletics
- Event: Middle-distance running
- Club: Preston Harriers

Achievements and titles
- Personal best(s): 800m: 1:44.48 (Pfungstadt, 2025); 1500: 3:37.40 (Dessau, 2025); Mile: 3:58.85 (Oxford, 2024)

Tiarnan Crorken (born 13 June 1999) is a British middle-distance runner. He competed at the 2025 World Athletics Championships having placed second over 800 metres at the 2025 British Championships.

== Early life ==
From Burnley, he attended Blessed Trinity Roman Catholic College and studied history at the University of Leeds before later entering into the collegiate system in the United States, at the University of Mississippi.

== Career ==
He trained as a member of Pendle athletics club and the Preston Harriers, where he was coached by Andy Bibby. He improved his 1500 metres best by 6 seconds in 2021, recording a new personal best time of 3:39.41 seconds in June 2021. He won the 1500m at the U23 English Championships in 2021 ahead of Joshua Lay and George Mills, and was subsequently selected for the 2021 European Athletics U23 Championships in Tallinn, Estonia.

In May 2025, he lowered his personal best for the 800 metres to 1:44.98 at the Belfast Milers event in Northern Ireland. He was selected for the 800 metres at the 2025 European Athletics Team Championships in Madrid in June 2025 for his senior international debut, placing tenth overall in the first division after a second-place finish in the B race in a time of 1:46.92, helping the Great Britain team to finish in fifth place overall. That month, he set a new personal best for the 1500 metres, running 3:37.40 in Germany.

On 2 August, he qualified for the final of the 800 metres at the 2025 UK Athletics Championships in Birmingham in 1:46.52, before placing second in the final behind Max Burgin in 1:45.56. Later that month, he ran a personal best for the 800 metres with 1:44.48 in Pfungstadt, Germany. He selected for his major championships debut as part of the British team for the 2025 World Athletics Championships in Tokyo, Japan, in September 2025 in the men's 800 metres, running 1:45.63 in his heat without advancing to the semi-finals.

Crorken placed third in the 800 metres behind training partners Peter Bol and Bob Abdelrahim in 1:44.53 at the Perth Track Classic in February 2025.
