= Giovanni Lazzaro =

Italian athlete (born 2004)

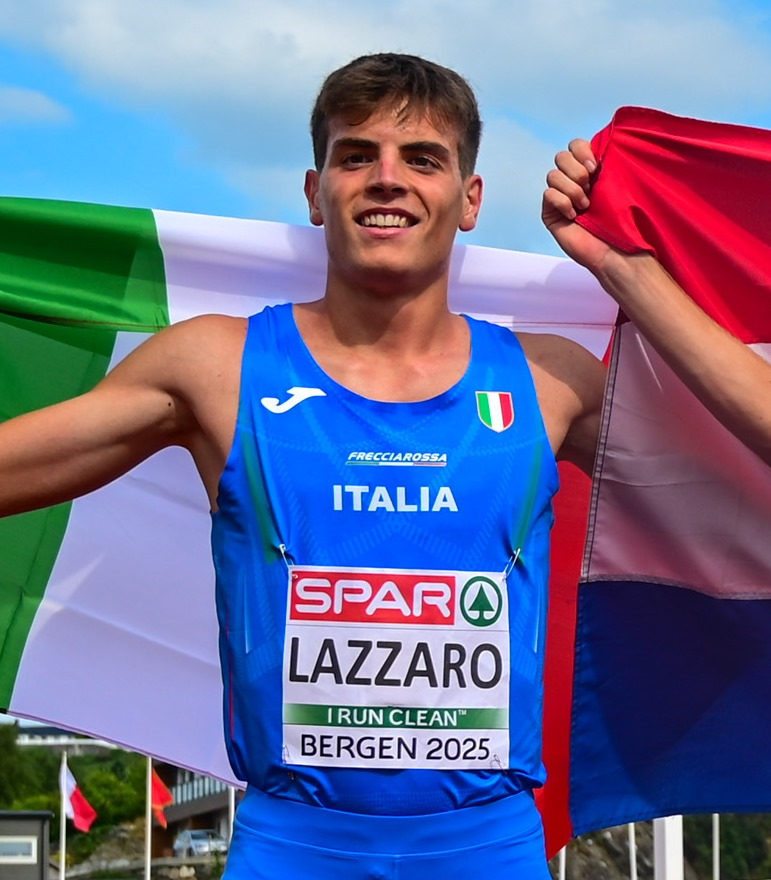
- Lazzaro in 2025

Personal information
- Nationality: Italian
- Born: 27 July 2004 (age 22)

Sport
- Sport: Athletics
- Events: 800m, 1500m

Achievements and titles
- Personal bests: 800 m: 1:44.59 (2026); 1500 m: 3:49.27 (2024)
Medal record
Men's athletics
Representing Italy
European U23 Championships
Bronze medal – third place	2025 Bergen	800m

Giovanni Lazzaro (born 27 July 2004) is an Italian middle-distance runner. He won the Italian Indoor Athletics Championships over 800 metres in 2025 and competed at the 2025 European Athletics Indoor Championships and the 2025 World Athletics Indoor Championships.

== Early life ==
He is from Morgano in the Province of Treviso in the Italian region Veneto. He studied at the Primo Levi sports science high school in Montebelluna.

== Career ==
He is a member of Assindustria Padova. He won the Italian Student Championship over 800 metres in 2021, running in a time of 1:51.53. He ran a personal best time of 1:50.64 in June 2021.

He finished second at the Italian Junior Championships in Rieti in the 800 meters in 2022. He subsequently competed in Cali, Colombia, for the 2022 World Athletics U20 Championships, where he reached the semi-finals. He became Italian indoor under-20 champion in the 800 metres in 2023. He then won the Italian under-20 outdoor 800 metres title in July 2023, in a time of 1:50.26. He competed for Italy at the 2023 European Athletics U20 Championships in Jerusalem, Israel.

He won the Italian Indoor Athletics Championships 800 metres title in Ancona, in February 2025, in a time of 1:47.42, at the age of 20 years-old. He was selected for the 2025 European Athletics Indoor Championships in Appeldoorn, Netherlands, but did not reach the semi-finals. He was subsequently selected for the 2025 World Athletics Indoor Championships in Nanjing, China, in March 2025, where he qualified for the semi-finals but did not progress into the final.

He won the bronze medal in the final of the 800 meters at the 2025 European Athletics U23 Championships in Bergen, Norway, behind Niels Laros and Justin Davies. He competed at the 2025 World Athletics Championships in Tokyo, Japan, in September 2025 in the men's 800 metres.

Competing at the Czesław Cybulski Memorial in Poznań in June 2026, he ran a personal best of 1:44.59 for the 800 metres to finish runner-up to Australian Daniel Williams. In August, he competed at the 2026 European Athletics Championships in Birmingham, England, in the 800 metres, reaching the semi-finals.

== National titles ==
Lazzaro has won two national championships at senior level.

- Italian Indoor Athletics Championships
  - 800 m: 2025, 2026

== See also ==
- Italian all-time lists - 800 metres
