= 2024 World Athletics U20 Championships – Men's 800 metres =

Men's 800 metres at the 2024 World Athletics U20 Championships
- Venue: Estadio Atlético de la VIDENA
- Dates: 27 August 2024 (heats); 29 August (semi-finals); 28 August 2024 (final)
- Competitors: 42 from 29 nations
- Winning time: 1:46.86

Medalists
gold medal	General Ayansa	Ethiopia
silver medal	Peyton Craig	Australia
bronze medal	Ko Ochiai	Japan

The men's 800 metres at the 2024 World Athletics U20 Championships was held at the Estadio Atlético de la VIDENA in Lima, Peru on 27, 28 and 30 August 2024.

== Records ==
U20 standing records prior to the 2024 World Athletics U20 Championships were as follows:

Record	Athlete & Nationality	Mark	Location	Date
World U20 Record	Nijel Amos (BOT)	1:41.73	London, United Kingdom	9 August 2012
Championship Record	Emmanuel Wanyonyi (KEN)	1:43.76	Nairobi, Kenya	22 August 2021
World U20 Leading	Peyton Craig (AUS)	1:44.11	Paris, France	9 August 2024

== Results ==
=== Heats ===
The first 3 athletes in each heat (Q) and the next 6 fastest (q) qualified to the semi-finals.

==== Heat 1 ====
Rank	Athlete	Nation	Time	Notes
1	Henry Jonas	Great Britain	1:49.89	Q
2	John O'Reilly	Canada	1:49.92	Q
3	Ayoub Elfakhar	Morocco	1:50.16	Q
4	Phanuel Koech	Kenya	1:50.20	q
5	Amado Amador	Mexico	1:50.30	q
6	Lucas Jara	Chile	1:51.41	
7	Nuno Cordeiro	Portugal	1:52.33	
8	Giancarlo Bravo	Peru	1:53.34	PB

==== Heat 2 ====
Rank	Athlete	Nation	Time	Notes
1	General Ayansa	Ethiopia	1:49.48	Q
2	William Rabjohns	Great Britain	1:51.20	Q
3	Davide De Rosa	Italy	1:51.34	Q
4	Uriel Muñoz	Argentina	1:51.35	
5	Ibrahim Abdalla	Qatar	1:51.67	
6	João Brito	Portugal	1:52.78	
7	Hayden Todd	Australia	1:57.41	

==== Heat 3 ====
Rank	Athlete	Nation	Time	Notes
1	Yanis Vanlanduyt	France	1:51.18	Q
2	Peyton Craig	Australia	1:51.43	Q
3	Togo Yoshizawa	Japan	1:51.49	Q
4	Jory Teixeira	Luxembourg	1:52.26	
5	Seif Hafsi	Algeria	1:52.68	
6	Sahil Khan	India	2:01.32	
–	Žan Ogrinc	Slovenia	DNS	

==== Heat 4 ====
Rank	Athlete	Nation	Time	Notes
1	Mohamed Amri	Tunisia	1:49.21	Q, PB
2	Kelvin Koech	Kenya	1:49.28	Q
3	Daniel Watcke	United States	1:49.86	Q
4	Matthew Burnett	South Africa	1:50.16	q
5	Carlos Lara	Brazil	1:50.56	q
6	Ian Mas	Honduras	1:56.17	
–	Thomas Cowan	New Zealand	DQ	TR17.2.3
–	Louis Buschbeck	Germany	DNS	

==== Heat 5 ====
Rank	Athlete	Nation	Time	Notes
1	Michael Long	United States	1:50.53	Q
2	Ko Ochiai	Japan	1:50.67	Q
3	Boubaker Bouhain	Algeria	1:50.75	Q
4	Karabelo Motlhabedi	South Africa	1:50.91	
5	Mohamed Chiha	Tunisia	1:51.38	
6	Robin Gloor	Switzerland	1:51.80	
7	Luca Borzi	Italy	1:52.11	

==== Heat 6 ====
Rank	Athlete	Nation	Time	Notes
1	Hatim Ait Oulghazi	Qatar	1:49.98	Q
2	Robin Lefebvre	Canada	1:50.04	Q
3	Noam Mamu	Israel	1:50.20	Q
4	Tom Stöber	Germany	1:50.32	q
5	Miguel Pantojas	Puerto Rico	1:50.75	q
6	James Ford	New Zealand	1:50.89	
7	Jānis Stūrītis	Latvia	1:51.09	

=== Semi-finals ===
The first 2 athletes in each heat (Q) and the next 2 fastest (q) qualified to the semi-final.

==== Heat 1 ====
Rank	Athlete	Nation	Time	Notes
1	Peyton Craig	Australia	1:47.31	Q
2	Kelvin Koech	Kenya	1:47.53	Q
3	Daniel Watcke	United States	1:47.68	q
4	Yanis Vanlanduyt	France	1:47.75	PB
5	Robin Lefebvre	Canada	1:49.03	
6	Carlos Lara	Brazil	1:50.32	PB
7	Togo Yoshizawa	Japan	1:52.86	
8	Davide De Rosa	Italy	1:54.42	

==== Heat 2 ====
Rank	Athlete	Nation	Time	Notes
1	General Ayansa	Ethiopia	1:47.28	Q
2	Hatim Ait Oulghazi	Qatar	1:47.51	Q
3	John O'Reilly	Canada	1:47.67	q, PB
4	Noam Mamu	Israel	1:48.46	
5	Matthew Burnett	South Africa	1:49.09	
6	Mohamed Amri	Tunisia	1:49.27	
7	Tom Stöber	Germany	1:53.59	
8	William Rabjohns	Great Britain	1:56.19	

==== Heat 3 ====
Rank	Athlete	Nation	Time	Notes
1	Phanuel Koech	Kenya	1:48.24	Q
2	Ko Ochiai	Japan	1:48.26	Q
3	Henry Jonas	Great Britain	1:48.28	
4	Michael Long	United States	1:49.05	
5	Boubaker Bouhain	Algeria	1:49.07	
6	Miguel Pantojas	Puerto Rico	1:51.08	
7	Amado Amador	Mexico	1:51.13	
8	Ayoub Elfakhar	Morocco	1:52.90	

=== Final ===
Rank	Athlete	Nation	Time	Notes
1st place, gold medalist(s)	General Ayansa	Ethiopia	1:46.86	
2nd place, silver medalist(s)	Peyton Craig	Australia	1:46.95	
3rd place, bronze medalist(s)	Ko Ochiai	Japan	1:47.03	
4	John O'Reilly	Canada	1:47.15	PB
5	Phanuel Koech	Kenya	1:47.46	
6	Hatim Ait Oulghazi	Qatar	1:47.96	
7	Kelvin Koech	Kenya	1:48.95	
8	Daniel Watcke	United States	1:50.55	
