= Bryce Hoppel =

American middle-distance runner (born 1997)

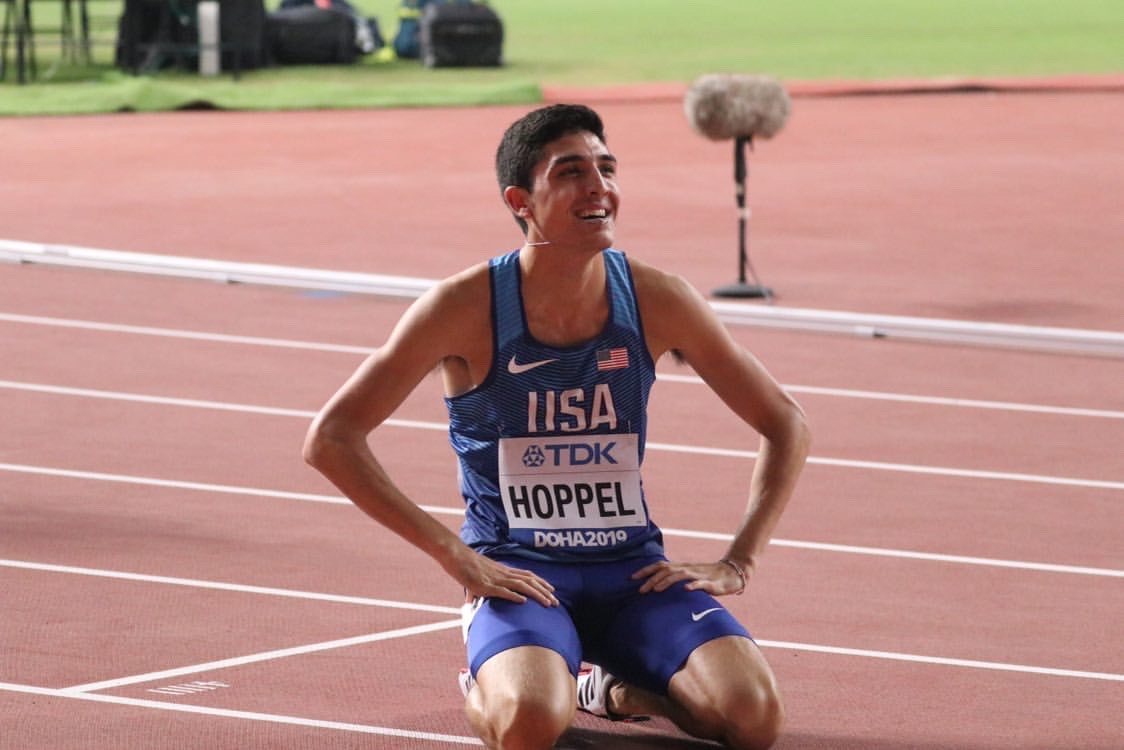
- Hoppel after the 800 m semifinal at Doha 2019

Personal information
- Born: September 5, 1997 (age 29) Midland, Texas, U.S.
- Height: 6 ft 0 in (182 cm)

Sport
- Sport: Track
- Event: 800 meters
- College team: Kansas Jayhawks
- Club: Adidas
- Coached by: Michael Whittlesey

Achievements and titles
- Personal bests: 800 m: 1:41.67 NR (Paris 2024); 1000 m: 2:15.99 (Monaco 2022); 1500 m: 3:39.78 (Kingston 2025); Indoor; 800 m: 1:44.19 (New York 2025); 1000 m: 2:16.27 (New York 2021)
Medal record
Men's athletics
Representing the United States
World Indoor Championships
Gold medal – first place	2024 Glasgow	800 m
Bronze medal – third place	2022 Belgrade	800 m

Bryce Hoppel (/ˈhɒpəl/ HOP-əl; born September 5, 1997) is an American middle-distance runner who specializes in the 800 meters. He is a former 800 meters world indoor champion having won gold at the 2024 World Indoor Championships in Glasgow. He also is a seven-time U.S. champion and two-time NCAA champion over the distance. At the 2024 Summer Olympics, Hoppel set an American record in the event, with a time of 1:41.67 to become the seventh fastest man and the second fastest North American man at the distance.

== Running career ==
=== High school ===
Hoppel competed for Midland High School in Midland, Texas. At Midland High School, Hoppel won the 2016 Texas 6A State Track & Field Championship with a time of 1:49.67, included an undefeated season in the 800 meters. Hoppel broke school records in the 800 meters (1:49.67), 1600 meters (4:10.51) and 3 miles (14:54.00) while at Midland, while graduating in the top-10 of his high school class.

=== College ===
While at the University of Kansas, Hoppel was a five-time All-American, two-time National Champion and four-time Big 12 Champion. In 2019, Hoppel completed a sweep of both the indoor and outdoor NCAA 800 meter titles, becoming the first male from the University of Kansas to win an NCAA title in the event. Hoppel's 21‑race unbeaten streak began during the indoor season in 2019, lasting until the USATF Outdoor Championships on 25 July. He trained under Coach Michael Whittlesey in Lawrence, Kansas.

Along the way of Hoppel's breakout season, he set the fifth fastest 800 meter time in NCAA history, running a 1:44.41 at the NCAA Outdoor Championships on 7 June 2019. Hoppel's time was just off the Kansas school record of 1:44.3 (m) set by the great Jim Ryun in 1966. Hoppel also set the Kansas indoor school record of 1:46.46 on 9 May 2019, while breaking facility records at the Birmingham CrossPlex and John McDonnell Field, among others.

While at the University of Kansas, Hoppel thrived under the coaching of Head Coach Stanley Redwine and Assistant Coach Michael Whittlesey.

=== Professional ===
==== 2019 ====
Upon the conclusion of his junior season, Hoppel announced he would forego his final year of NCAA eligibility to pursue a professional running career. In his first competition representing Team USA, Hoppel placed fourth overall at the Pan-American Championships in Lima, Peru, running a 1:47.48.

Hoppel announced on August 17 that he had signed a professional contract with Adidas.

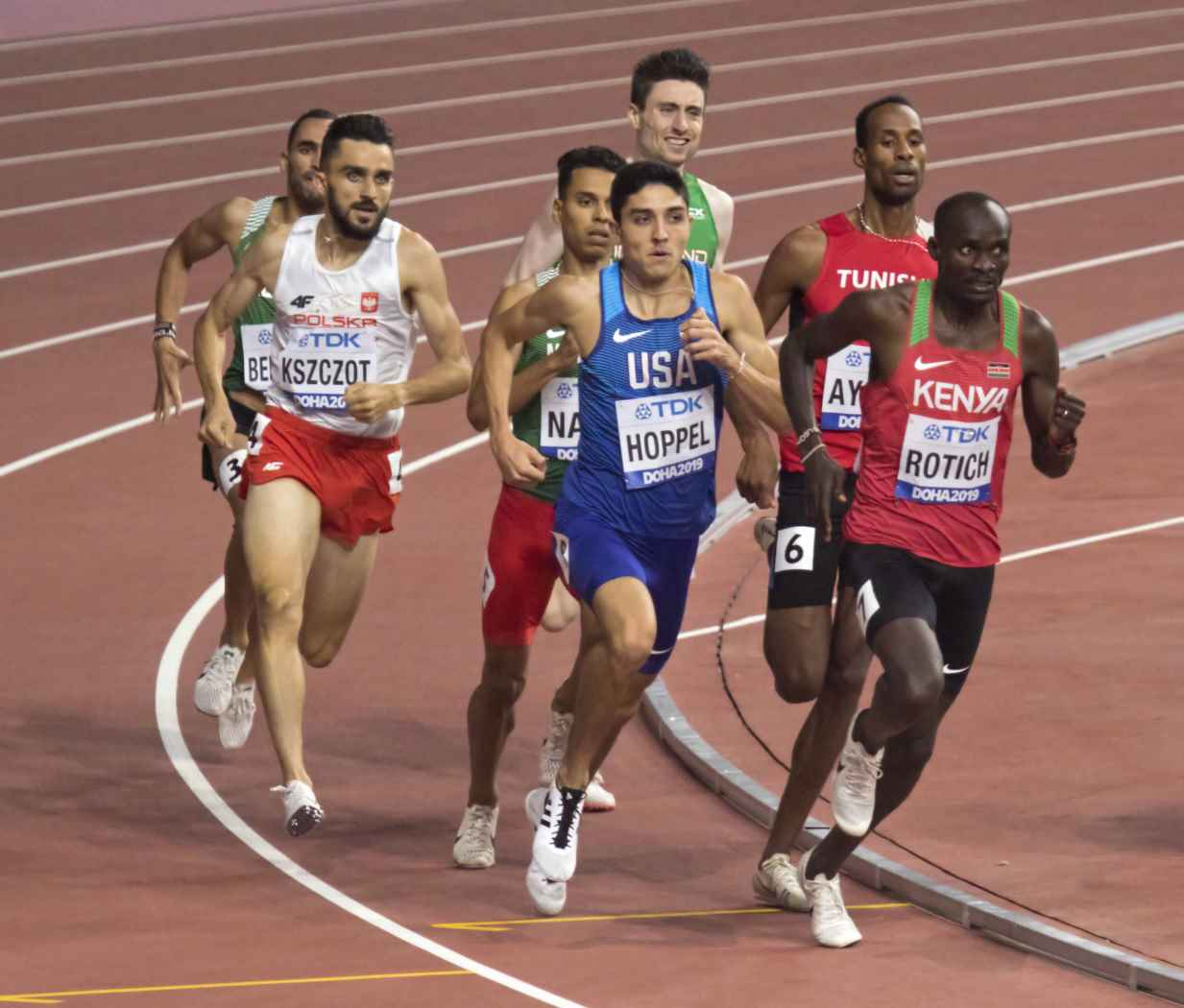
Hoppel (center) competing at the 2019 World Championships

Hoppel qualified for the 2019 World Championships in the 800 m, after finishing third at the US Championships. After completing a full three seasons of collegiate running, Hoppel secured a 4th-place finish in the 800 meter final on October 1, one year and one month after his season-opening cross-country race at the Bob Timmons Invitational on September 1, 2018. Remarkably, he was able to set another personal best, finishing a long season in style with a 1:44.25 performance.

==== 2020 ====
On 15 February Hoppel earned his first national title at the USA Track & Field Indoor Championships, held in Albuquerque, New Mexico, running a time of 1:46.67 to win the 800 m final.

In August, he competed in the Monaco Herculis meeting, where he was narrowly defeated by fellow American and reigning 800 meters world champion Donavan Brazier. In that race, Hoppel improved his personal best in the 800 meters to 1:43.23.

==== 2021 ====
Hoppel began his 2021 campaign with a 1:44.37 indoor 800 meter in Fayetteville, Arkansas. At the time, this was the second fastest indoor 800 meters in American history, behind only American record holder Donavan Brazier.

On 13 February Hoppel competed in the 1000‑meter run at the New Balance Indoor Grand Prix. In that race, he won comfortably, setting a new American record in the indoor 1000 meters with his time of 2:16.27.

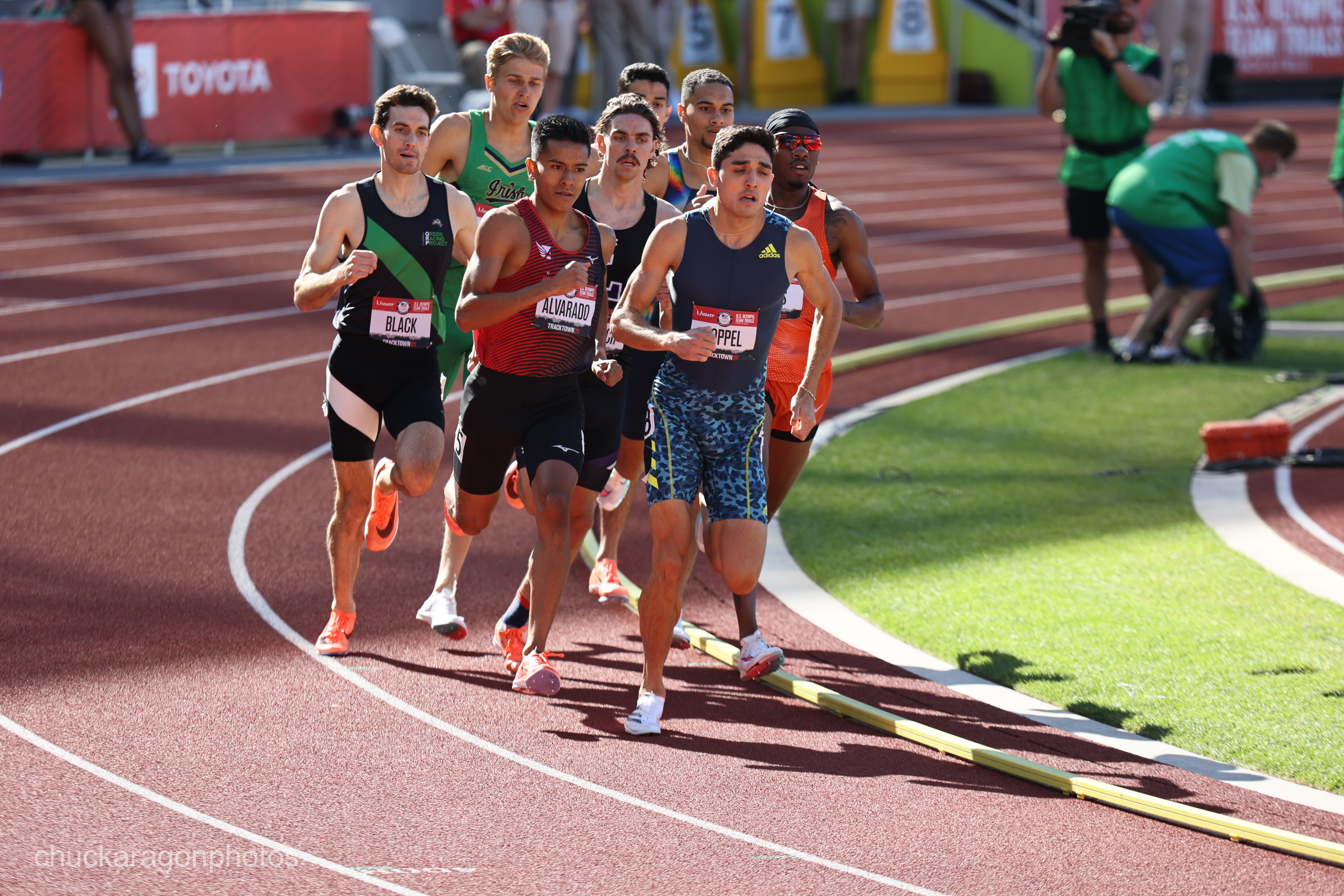
Hoppel (front) competes at the 2020 US Olympic Trials.

On June 21, he qualified for the US Olympic team in the 800 meters. Hoppel finished third in the Olympic trials in Eugene, Oregon with a time of 1:44.14, qualifying him for the Tokyo Olympics later that summer.

At the 2020 Summer Olympics, he finished in third place in his round 1 qualifying heat with a time of 1:45.64, qualifying him for the semi‑finals where he finished in fifth place in his heat with a time of 1:44.91. His semi‑final performance was Hoppel's second fastest time of the year but was not enough for a place in the Olympic final.

==== 2022 ====
To open his 2022 season, Hoppel won the Millrose Games 800 m with a time of 1:46.05 on January 29. A few weeks later on February 6, at the New Balance Indoor Grand Prix, he placed second in the 800 m with a time of 1:46.08 behind Spaniard Mariano García.

Competing at the US Indoor Championships, he successfully defended his title 800 m national indoor title running a time of 1:45.30, qualifying him to compete at the World Indoor Championships in Belgrade. In Belgrade, Hoppel earned a bronze medal, placing third behind Mariano Garcia in first, and Noah Kibet in second, running a tim eof 1:46.51 in the process.

On 26 June, he earned his first US Outdoor title, winning the 800 m in a time seasons best time of 1:44.60. He was unable to replicate that successful showing at the World Championships the next month in Eugene, placing fourth in his heat and not advancing to the semi-finals.

==== 2023 ====
In 2023, Hoppel successfully defended both his US indoor and outdoor 800 m titles. The former with a 1:45.92 performance in Albuquerque, New Mexico and the latter running a 1:46.20 at Hayward Field.

On 21 July, Bryce clocked his first sub-1:44 since 2020, running 1:43.95 to take 6th place at the Herculis Meeting.

Competing at the World Championships in Budapest, Hoppel cruised through the heats, earning a place in the final. In the final, he finished 7th in a time of 1:46.02.

==== 2024 ====
On 4 February, Hoppel competed in the short track 1000 meters at the New Balance Indoor Grand Prix, finishing in a time of 2:16.91 behind Marco Arop's new North, Central American and Caribbean area record of 2:14.74.

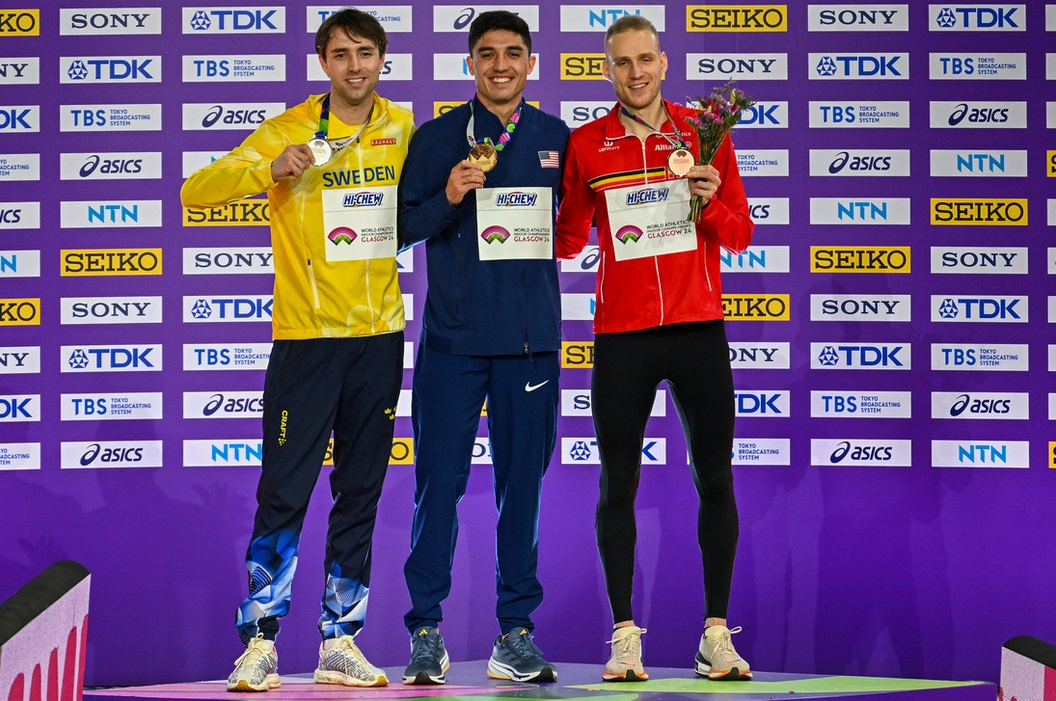
Hoppel (center) after taking first at the 2024 World Indoor Championships

On 11 February, Hoppel took first at the Millrose Games 800 m, in a time of 1:45.54. The next week, he won his 5th straight US 800 m title (counting both indoor and outdoor), with a 1:46.67 clocking in Albuquerque.

On 3 March, Hoppel won the 800 m at the 2024 World Indoor Championships in Glasgow, United Kingdom, in a world leading time of 1:44.92, improving upon his bronze medal from 2022.

On 30 June, Hoppel won the 800 m final at the US Olympic Trials, finishing in a new personal best and trials record of 1:42.77. Hoppel, along with his training partner Hobbs Kessler, and Brooks Beasts athlete Brandon Miller, were named the men's 800 meter Team USA representatives for the 2024 Summer Olympics.

At the 2024 Summer Olympics, Hoppel made it through the heats and semifinals of the 800 m. In the final on 10 August, he finished fourth in a new American record and personal best of 1:41.67, breaking Donavan Brazier's previous American record of 1:42.34 by 0.67 seconds. Hoppel's time places him as the seventh fastest 800 meter runner in history. Finishing ahead of Hoppel was Algerian Djamel Sedjati in 1:41.50, Canadian Marco Arop in 1:41.20, and Kenyan Emmanuel Wanyonyi, who won the race in 1:41.19. Hoppel's performance was not a new area record given Arop's clocking of 1:41.20.

==== 2025 ====
On February 8, at the Millrose Games, Hoppel finished second to Josh Hoey in the men's indoor 800 meters, running 1:44.19. Hoey set a new national record of 1:43.90 in the event, while Hoppel also finished inside Donavan Brazier's previous record of 1:44.21.

On May 16, Hoppel finished second to Tshepiso Masalela in the Doha Diamond League, running 1:43.26. On June 15, Hoppel competed in the Stockholm Diamond League. On July 9, Hoppel finished seventh in the Herculis meeting, with a time of 1:43.51.

On August 3, Hoppel finished third to Cooper Lutkenhaus and Donavan Brazier in the 800 meter final at the 2025 USA Outdoor Track and Field Championships, in a season's best time of 1:42.49.

== Competition record ==
=== International Competitions ===
Year	Competition	Venue	Position	Event	Time
Representing the United States
2019	Pan Am Games	Lima, Peru	4th	800 m	1:47.48
2019	World Championships	Doha, Qatar	4th	800 m	1:44.25
2021	Olympics Games	Tokyo, Japan	16th (sf)	800 m	1:44.91
2022	World Indoor Championships	Belgrade, Serbia	3rd	800 m	1:46.51
2022	World Championships	Eugene, Oregon	27th (h)	800 m	1:46.98
2023	World Championships	Budapest, Hungary	7th	800 m	1:46.02
2024	World Indoor Championships	Glasgow, Scotland	1st	800 m	1:44.92
2024	Olympic Games	Paris, France	4th	800 m	1:41.67
2025	World Championships	Tokyo, Japan	9th (sf)	800 m	1:43.92

=== Circuit performances ===
Grand Slam Track results
Slam	Race group	Event	Pl.	Time	Prize money
2025 Kingston Slam	Short distance	1500 m	7th	3:39.78	US$15,000
2025 Kingston Slam	Short distance	800 m	3rd	1:47.02	US$15,000

=== National Championships ===
Year	Competition	Venue	Position	Event	Time
Representing the Kansas Jayhawks (2018-2019) and Adidas (2020–present)
2018	USA Outdoor Track and Field Championships	Des Moines, Iowa	18th	800 m	1:48.09
2019	USA Outdoor Track and Field Championships	Des Moines, Iowa	3rd	800 m	1:46.31
2020	USA Indoor Track and Field Championships	Albuquerque, New Mexico	1st	800 m	1:46.67
2021	USA Olympic Trials	Eugene, Oregon	3rd	800 m	1:44.14
2022	USA Indoor Track and Field Championships	Spokane, Washington	1st	800 m	1:45.30
2022	USA Outdoor Track and Field Championships	Eugene, Oregon	1st	800 m	1:44.60
2023	USA Indoor Track and Field Championships	Albuquerque, New Mexico	1st	800 m	1:45.92
2023	USA Outdoor Track and Field Championships	Eugene, Oregon	1st	800 m	1:46.20
2024	USA Indoor Track and Field Championships	Albuquerque, New Mexico	1st	800 m	1:46.67
2024	USA Olympic Trials	Eugene, Oregon	1st	800 m	1:42.77
2025	USA Outdoor Track and Field Championships	Eugene, Oregon	3rd	800 m	1:42.49

=== NCAA Championships ===
Year	Competition	Venue	Position	Event	Time
Representing the United States
2018	NCAA Indoor Track and Field Championships	College Station, Texas	8th	800 m	1:50.06
2018	NCAA Outdoor Track and Field Championships	Hayward Field	4th	800 m	1:45.67
2019	NCAA Indoor Track and Field Championships	Birmingham, Alabama	1st	800 m	1:46.46
2019	NCAA Outdoor Track and Field Championships	Mike A. Myers Stadium	1st	800 m	1:44.41

== Personal life ==
Hoppel is the son of Monty and Rita Hoppel and has two older siblings, Kelsey and Megan. His father is the general manager for the Midland RockHounds Double-A minor league affiliate of the Oakland Athletics in the Texas League.

At the University of Kansas, Hoppel studied business finance. He is Catholic.
