= 2022 African Championships in Athletics – Men's 800 metres =

The men's 800 metres event at the 2022 African Championships in Athletics was held in Mauritius.

== Medalists ==
Gold	Silver	Bronze
Slimane Moula; Algeria	Nicholas Kiplagat; Kenya	Tshepiso Masalela; Botswana

== Results ==
=== Heats ===
Qualification: First 2 of each heat (Q) and the next 6 fastest (q) qualified for the semifinals.

Rank	Heat	Name	Nationality	Time	Notes
1	1	Elias Ngeny	Kenya	1:47.16	Q
2	1	Tolesa Bodena	Ethiopia	1:47.32	Q
3	1	Oussama Nabil	Morocco	1:47.82	q
4	3	Tshepiso Masalela	Botswana	1:48.69	Q
5	3	Riadh Chninni	Tunisia	1:48.80	Q
6	3	Ali Idow Hassan	Somalia	1:49.03	q
7	1	Jabulane Ncamane	South Africa	1:49.18	q
8	3	Bacha Morka	Ethiopia	1:49.34	q
9	1	David Dam	Namibia	1:49.62	q
10	2	Efrem Mekonnen	Ethiopia	1:49.96	Q
11	2	Kabelo Mohlosi	South Africa	1:50.21	Q
12	4	Slimane Moula	Algeria	1:50.10	Q
13	4	Nicholas Kiplagat	Kenya	1:50.20	Q
14	3	Tom Dradriga	Uganda	1:50.30	q
15	4	Emmanuel Osuje	Uganda	1:50.63	
16	5	Abdessalem Ayouni	Tunisia	1:50.83	Q
17	5	Ramzi Abdennouz	Algeria	1:50.86	Q
18	5	Tshepo Tshite	South Africa	1:51.07	
19	5	Abdelati El Guesse	Morocco	1:51.55	
20	5	Edrissa Marong	Gambia	1:52.10	
21	2	Abraham Thon	South Sudan	1:52.66	
22	4	Francky Edgard Mbotto	Central African Republic	1:54.08	
23	4	Sylvain Azonhin	Benin	1:55.41	
24	2	Nathan Kilongo	Democratic Republic of the Congo	1:55.97	
25	5	Illa Salifou Chaibou	Niger	2:00.76	
	1	Sadam Koumi	Sudan	DNS	
	1	Christian Ucircan	Democratic Republic of the Congo	DNS	
	2	Emmanuel Korir	Kenya	DNS	
	2	Alex Amankwah	Ghana	DNS	
	2	Brayane Moungamba	Gabon	DNS	
	3	Kevin Boubando	Republic of the Congo	DNS	
	3	Babker Koudi	Sudan	DNS	
	3	Mohamed Ali Algorni Alaa	Libya	DNS	
	4	Mostafa Smaïli	Morocco	DNS	
	4	Andrew Rhobi	Tanzania	DNS	
	4	Allan Chirwa	Malawi	DNS	
	5	Edose Ibadin	Nigeria	DNS	
	5	Simon Merendya	Tanzania	DNS	
	5	Aden Moussa Absieh	Djibouti	DNS	

=== Semifinals ===
Qualification: First 3 of each semifinal (Q) and the next 2 fastest (q) qualified for the final.

Rank	Heat	Name	Nationality	Time	Notes
1	1	Slimane Moula	Algeria	1:46.22	Q
2	1	Nicholas Kiplagat	Kenya	1:46.51	Q
3	1	Ramzi Abdennouz	Algeria	1:46.67	Q
4	1	Tshepiso Masalela	Botswana	1:46.80	q
5	1	Riadh Chninni	Tunisia	1:47.36	q
6	2	Abdessalem Ayouni	Tunisia	1:48.14	Q
7	2	Oussama Nabil	Morocco	1:48.54	Q
8	2	Elias Ngeny	Kenya	1:48.57	Q
9	1	Ali Idow Hassan	Somalia	1:49.24	
10	2	Tolesa Bodena	Ethiopia	1:49.34	
11	1	Jabulane Ncamane	South Africa	1:49.72	
12	1	Efrem Mekonnen	Ethiopia	1:49.81	
13	2	Bacha Morka	Ethiopia	1:50.49	
14	2	Tom Dradriga	Uganda	1:51.28	
15	2	Kabelo Mohlosi	South Africa	1:51.82	
16	2	David Dam	Namibia	1:52.13	

=== Final ===
Rank	Athlete	Nationality	Time	Notes
1st place, gold medalist(s)	Slimane Moula	Algeria	1:45.59	
2nd place, silver medalist(s)	Nicholas Kiplagat	Kenya	1:46.43	
3rd place, bronze medalist(s)	Tshepiso Masalela	Botswana	1:46.65	
4	Abdessalem Ayouni	Tunisia	1:46.68	
5	Elias Ngeny	Kenya	1:46.81	
6	Riadh Chninni	Tunisia	1:46.91	
7	Oussama Nabil	Morocco	1:47.01	
8	Ramzi Abdennouz	Algeria	1:47.33	
