= 2025 European Athletics U23 Championships – Men's 800 metres =

Men's 800 metres at the 2025 European Athletics U23 Championships
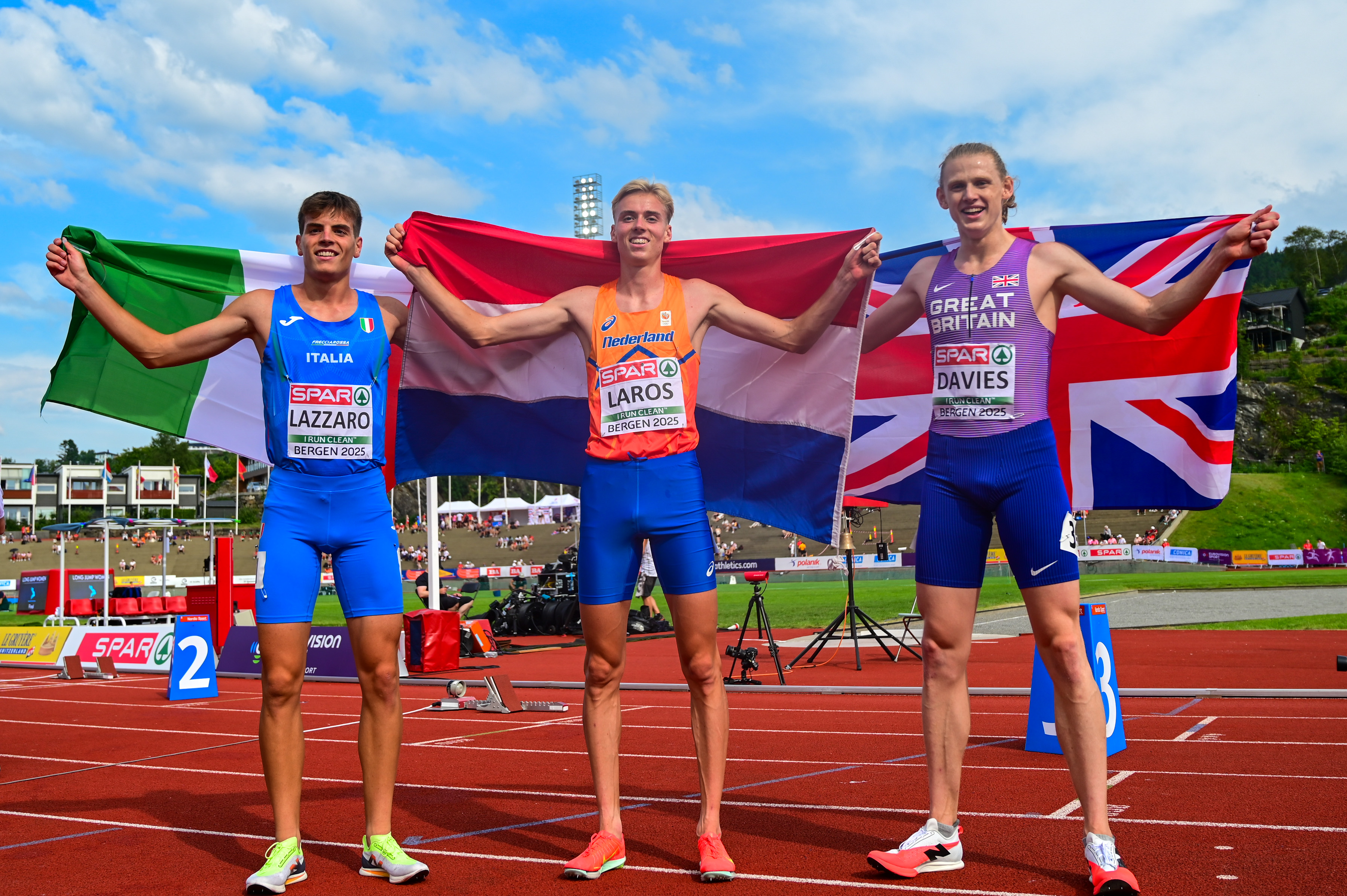
- Top three finishers
- Venue: Fana Stadion
- Location: Bergen, Norway
- Dates: 18 July (heats); 20 July (final)
- Competitors: 29 from 19 nations
- Winning time: 1:44.36

Medalists
| gold medal | Niels Laros | Netherlands |
| silver medal | Justin Davies | Great Britain |
| bronze medal | Giovanni Lazzaro | Italy |

The men's 800 metres event at the 2025 European Athletics U23 Championships was held in Bergen, Norway, at Fana Stadion on 18 and 20 July.

== Records ==
Prior to the competition, the records were as follows:

| Record | Athlete (nation) | Time (s) | Location | Date |
|---|---|---|---|---|
| European U23 record | Yuriy Borzakovskiy (RUS) | 1:42.47 | Brussels, Belgium | 24 August 2001 |
| Championship U23 record | Nils Schumann (GER) | 1:45.21 | Gothenburg, Sweden | 1 August 1999 |

== Results ==
=== Heats ===
First 2 in each heat (Q) and the next 2 fastest (q) qualified for the final.

==== Heat 1 ====
| Place | Athlete | Nation | Time | Notes |
|---|---|---|---|---|
| 1 | Francesco Pernici | Italy | 1:44.06 | Q, CR, PB |
| 2 | Henry Jonas | Great Britain | 1:44.10 | Q, PB |
| 3 | Niels Laros | Netherlands | 1:44.19 | q, PB |
| 4 | Thomas Marques de Andrade | France | 1:44.50 | q, PB |
| 5 | Ronaldo Olivo | Spain | 1:44.87 | PB |
| 6 | Kacper Lewalski | Poland | 1:45.05 | SB |
| 7 | Louis Low-Beer | Switzerland | 1:47.95 | |
| 8 | John Petter Stevik | Norway | 1:48.20 | |
| 9 | János Kubasi | Hungary | 1:48.67 | |
| 10 | Filip Bielek | Slovakia | 1:50.57 | |

==== Heat 2 ====
| Place | Athlete | Nation | Time | Notes |
|---|---|---|---|---|
| 1 | Justin Davies | Great Britain | 1:44.67 | Q |
| 2 | Ramon Wipfli | Switzerland | 1:44.92 | Q, NU23R |
| 3 | Jakub Dudycha | Czech Republic | 1:45.46 | |
| 4 | Malik Skupin-Alfa | Germany | 1:45.84 | |
| 5 | Uku Renek Kronbergs | Estonia | 1:46.77 | NU23R |
| 6 | David Cartiel | Spain | 1:47.12 | PB |
| 7 | Dion Eijssen | Netherlands | 1:47.73 | |
| 8 | Laust Kaastrup Kjær | Denmark | 1:51.16 | |
| 9 | Ole Jakob Solbu | Norway | 2:00.66 | SB |
| — | Gabriele Angiono | Italy | DQ | TR 17.2.3 |

==== Heat 3 ====
| Place | Athlete | Nation | Time | Notes |
|---|---|---|---|---|
| 1 | Alexander Stepanov | Germany | 1:46.60 | Q |
| 2 | Giovanni Lazzaro | Italy | 1:46.72 | Q |
| 3 | David Race | Great Britain | 1:47.15 | |
| 4 | Bartosz Kitliński | Poland | 1:47.35 | |
| 5 | Ömer Faruk Bozdağ | Turkey | 1:47.69 | |
| 6 | David Garcia | Portugal | 1:47.82 | |
| 7 | Mathis Espagnet | Luxembourg | 1:48.32 | |
| 8 | Anže Svit Požgaj | Slovenia | 1:49.58 | |
| — | Nino Jambrešić | Croatia | DNF | |

=== Final ===
| Place | Athlete | Nation | Time | Notes |
|---|---|---|---|---|
| 1st place, gold medalist(s) | Niels Laros | Netherlands | 1:44.36 | |
| 2nd place, silver medalist(s) | Justin Davies | Great Britain | 1:44.97 | |
| 3rd place, bronze medalist(s) | Giovanni Lazzaro | Italy | 1:44.98 | |
| 4 | Francesco Pernici | Italy | 1:45.01 | |
| 5 | Henry Jonas | Great Britain | 1:45.17 | |
| 6 | Alexander Stepanov | Germany | 1:45.32 | |
| 7 | Ramon Wipfli | Switzerland | 1:45.78 | |
| 8 | Thomas Marques de Andrade | France | 1:45.95 | |
