= 2026 World Athletics U20 Championships – Men's 800 metres =

Men's 800 metres at the 2026 World Athletics U20 Championships
- Venue: Hayward Field
- Dates: 5 August (Round 1); 7 August (Semi-finals); 8 August (Final)
- Competitors: 43
- Winning time: 1:44.64

Medalists
gold medal	Imad Bouchajda	Morocco
silver medal	Daniel Williams	Australia
bronze medal	Alejandro Ríos	Spain

The men's 800 metres at the 2026 World Athletics U20 Championships was held at Hayward Field in Eugene, United States on 5, 7 and 8 August 2026.

== Records ==
U20 standing records prior to the 2026 World Athletics U20 Championships were as follows:

Record	Athlete & Nationality	Mark	Location	Date
World U20 Record	Nijel Amos (BOT)	1:41.73	London, United Kingdom	9 August 2012
Championship Record	Emmanuel Wanyonyi (KEN)	1:43.76	Nairobi, Kenya	22 August 2021
World U20 Leading	Cooper Lutkenhaus (USA)	1:42.08	Oslo, Norway	10 June 2026

== Results ==
=== Round 1 ===
Round 1 took place in the morning session on 5 August 2026. First 5 of each heat (Q) plus 2 fastest times (q) qualified to the semi-finals.

==== Heat 1 ====
Place	Athlete	Nation	Time	Notes
1	Negahe Eyasu	Ethiopia	1:51.16	Q
2	Łukasz Zaczyk	Poland	1:51.33	Q
3	Nashon Pkiach	Kenya	1:51.35	Q
4	Alejandro Muñoz	Spain	1:52.02	Q
5	Sondre Lehman	Norway	1:52.05	Q
6	Ryan Georgeson	Canada	1:52.20	
7	Uwin Anand Ananthan	India	1:52.37	
8	Theo Hielscher	Germany	1:54.41	
9	Victor Miguel Mbundo	Angola	1:59.66	PB

==== Heat 2 ====
Place	Athlete	Nation	Time	Notes
1	Shafeck Murungi	Uganda	1:46.64	Q, PB
2	Daniel Williams	Australia	1:47.47	Q
3	Werner Gouws	South Africa	1:47.54	Q
4	Yerosan Girma	Ethiopia	1:47.57	Q, PB
5	Conall McLean	New Zealand	1:47.90	Q, PB
6	Joshua Mungin	Great Britain	1:48.00	q
7	Jan Emanuel Merheim	Germany	1:49.32	q, PB
8	Josué Barros	Brazil	1:49.41	PB
9	Iskender Chokaev	Kyrgyzstan	1:57.83	

==== Heat 3 ====
Place	Athlete	Nation	Time	Notes
1	Imad Bouchajda	Morocco	1:51.28	Q
2	Iwo Urbanowicz	Poland	1:51.34	Q
3	Matthew McKenna	Great Britain	1:51.49	Q
4	Joel Morgan	Jamaica	1:51.75	Q
5	Kaleb Burroughs	United States	1:51.77	Q
6	David Moura	Portugal	1:51.82	
7	Vasileios Salpas	Greece	1:52.41	
8	Karol Emilio Picazo	Mexico	1:56.75	
—	Luan Gabriel da Castro	Brazil	DQ	TR17.3.3

==== Heat 4 ====
Place	Athlete	Nation	Time	Notes
1	Alejandro Ríos	Spain	1:50.85	Q
2	Benjamin Lakošeljac	Slovenia	1:51.00	Q
3	Emile Els	South Africa	1:51.11	Q
4	Valerio Ciaramella	Italy	1:51.32	Q
5	Amado Amador	Mexico	1:51.56	Q
6	Enrique Ramos	Puerto Rico	1:52.01	
7	Zeyad Mohamed Farouk Mohamed	Egypt	1:52.20	
8	Nethsara Dineth Liyanage Gagabada	Sri Lanka	1:56.34	

==== Heat 5 ====
Place	Athlete	Nation	Time	Notes
1	Collins Tajewou	Kenya	1:51.19	Q
2	Harry Halleen	Australia	1:52.24	Q
3	Mogali Venkatram	India	1:52.81	Q
4	Stefon Dodoo	United States	1:53.01	Q
5	Joe Martin	New Zealand	1:53.11	Q
6	Giancarlo Bravo	Peru	1:53.57	
7	Musaad Obaid Alsubaie	Saudi Arabia	1:54.77	
8	D'Angelo Brown	Grenada	1:54.89	

=== Semi-finals ===
Semi-finals took place in the afternoon session on 7 August 2026. First 3 of each heat (Q) qualified to the final.

==== Heat 1 ====
Place	Athlete	Nation	Time	Notes
1	Shafeck Murungi	Uganda	1:46.41	Q, PB
2	Imad Bouchajda	Morocco	1:46.66	Q
3	Harry Halleen	Australia	1:48.17	Q, PB
4	Joshua Mungin	Great Britain	1:48.31	
5	Werner Gouws	South Africa	1:48.89	
6	Iwo Urbanowicz	Poland	1:50.28	
7	Jan Emanuel Merheim	Germany	1:51.02	
—	Yerosan Girma	Ethiopia	DQ	TR17.2.3
—	Stefon Dodoo	United States	DQ	TR17.1.2

==== Heat 2 ====
Place	Athlete	Nation	Time	Notes
1	Nashon Pkiach	Kenya	1:45.82	Q, PB
2	Alejandro Ríos	Spain	1:46.66	Q, PB
3	Benjamin Lakošeljac	Slovenia	1:47.19	Q
4	Mogali Venkatram	India	1:48.40	
5	Joel Morgan	Jamaica	1:49.46	PB
6	Conall McLean	New Zealand	1:49.96	
7	Valerio Ciaramella	Italy	1:50.28	
8	Łukasz Zaczyk	Poland	1:50.37	
9	Kaleb Burroughs	United States	1:51.38	

==== Heat 3 ====
Place	Athlete	Nation	Time	Notes
1	Collins Tajewou	Kenya	1:47.72	Q
2	Daniel Williams	Australia	1:48.29	Q
3	Alejandro Muñoz	Spain	1:49.08	Q
4	Matthew McKenna	Great Britain	1:49.46	
5	Joe Martin	New Zealand	1:49.68	
6	Sondre Lehman	Norway	1:50.39	
7	Negahe Eyasu	Ethiopia	1:50.86	
8	Emile Els	South Africa	1:51.02	
9	Amado Amador	Mexico	1:51.32	

=== Final ===
The final took place in the afternoon session on 8 August 2026.

Place	Athlete	Nation	Time	Notes
1st place, gold medalist(s)	Imad Bouchajda	Morocco	1:44.64	
2nd place, silver medalist(s)	Daniel Williams	Australia	1:45.36	
3rd place, bronze medalist(s)	Alejandro Ríos	Spain	1:46.25	
4	Benjamin Lakošeljac	Slovenia	1:46.81	
5	Collins Tajewou	Kenya	1:48.50	
6	Nashon Pkiach	Kenya	1:49.49	
7	Alejandro Muñoz	Spain	1:50.20	
8	Shafeck Murungi	Uganda	1:50.78	
9	Harry Halleen	Australia	1:51.78	
