= Justin O'Toole =

Canadian middle-distance runner (born 2001)

Personal information
- Nationality: Canadian
- Born: 20 December 2001 (age 24) Montreal, Canada

Sport
- Sport: Athletics
- Event: Middle-distance running

Achievements and titles
- Personal bests: 800 m: 1:44.42 (2025); 1500 m: 3:49.67 (2025)

Justin O'Toole (born 20 December 2001) is a Canadian middle-distance runner.

== Early life ==
He born in Montreal before studying in the United States at Columbia College, part of Columbia University, and later being a graduate transfer to the University of Washington.

== Career ==
He was a member of the Washington Huskies team medley quartet, who ran a time of 9:14.10 for an indoor best time in 2025 at the Husky Classic, beating the 9:16.40 set by Oklahoma State in 2023 and the absolute best, 9:14.58 by a Brooks Beast Track Club team set the previous year. He qualified for the final of the 800 metres at the NCAA Indoor Championships in Virginia Beach in March 2025, placing sixth overall.

He was runner-up to Marco Arop at the 2025 Canadian Athletics Championships over 800 metres, running a new personal best time of 1:45.51 in August 2025. He ran a new personal best for the 800 metres of 1:44.42 on 20 August 2025, in Pfungstadt, Germany to also meet the automatic qualifying standard for the upcoming world championships. He competed at the 2025 World Athletics Championships in Tokyo, Japan, in September 2025 in the men's 800 metres.

In July 2026, he competed in the 800 metres at the 2026 Commonwealth Games in Glasgow, Scotland.
