= 2026 African Championships in Athletics – Men's 800 metres =

Men's 800 metres at the 2026 African Championships in Athletics
- Venue: Legon Sports Stadium
- Location: Accra, Ghana
- Dates: 12–14 May
- Competitors: 19 from 15 nations
- Winning time: 1:45.47

Medalists
gold medal	Kelvin Kimtai Loti	Kenya
silver medal	Imad Bouchajda	Morocco
bronze medal	Alex Amankwah	Ghana

The men's 800 metres event at the 2026 African Championships in Athletics was held on 12 and 14 May in Accra, Ghana.

== Results ==
=== Heats ===
First 2 of each heat (Q) and the next 2 fastest (q) qualified for the final.

Rank	Heat	Athlete	Nationality	Time	Notes
1	1	Mohamed Ali Gouaned	Algeria	1:46.35	Q
2	1	Imad Bouchajda	Morocco	1:46.66	Q
3	1	Alex Amankwah	Ghana	1:46.83	q
4	1	Abebe Lemecha	Ethiopia	1:47.07	q
5	1	Laban Kipkorir Chepkwony	Kenya	1:47.32	
6	3	Kelvin Kimtai Loti	Kenya	1:47.63	Q
7	3	Letlhogonolo Mokgethi	Botswana	1:47.86	Q
8	3	Biruk Tadese	Ethiopia	1:47.91	
9	1	Fithawi Zaid	Eritrea	1:48.06	
10	3	Abdessalem Ayouni	Tunisia	1:48.13	
11	2	Mersimoi Kasahun	Ethiopia	1:48.26	Q
12	2	Brian Masai	Kenya	1:48.73	Q
13	2	Edmund du Plessis	South Africa	1:49.42	qR
14	2	Makman Yoagbati	Togo	1:49.74	
15	3	Tom Dradriga	Uganda	1:49.87	
16	3	Fabrice Iradukunda	Burundi	1:51.25	
17	2	Mayibongwe Vilakati	Eswatini	1:52.60	
18	2	Sheriff Flodavid Soclo	Liberia	1:54.85	
19	2	Patrick Kpamba Mandata	Central African Republic	1:57.04	
	1	Omar Hussein Ahmed	Somalia	DNS	
	1	Rech Lounianga	Republic of the Congo	DNS	
	1	Perina Lokure Nakang	ART	DNS	
	2	Daudi Jafary Ngimba	Tanzania	DNS	
	2	Martiats Eharisto	Angola	DNS	
	2	Adam Mohamed Abdulkadir	Somalia	DNS	
	3	Mathias Mashauri Masalu	Tanzania	DNS	
	3	Qloire Lekoungou	Republic of the Congo	DNS	
	3	Kevin Pambou Boulinqui	Gabon	DNS	

=== Final ===
Rank	Athlete	Nationality	Time	Notes
1st place, gold medalist(s)	Kelvin Kimtai Loti	Kenya	1:45.47	
2nd place, silver medalist(s)	Imad Bouchajda	Morocco	1:45.62	
3rd place, bronze medalist(s)	Alex Amankwah	Ghana	1:46.18	
4	Mohamed Ali Gouaned	Algeria	1:46.19	
5	Brian Masai	Kenya	1:46.75	
6	Letlhogonolo Mokgethi	Botswana	1:46.79	
7	Abebe Lemecha	Ethiopia	1:47.09	
8	Mersimoi Kasahun	Ethiopia	1:47.31	
9	Edmund du Plessis	South Africa	1:47.82	
