= Kelvin Loti =

Kenyan athlete (born 1999)

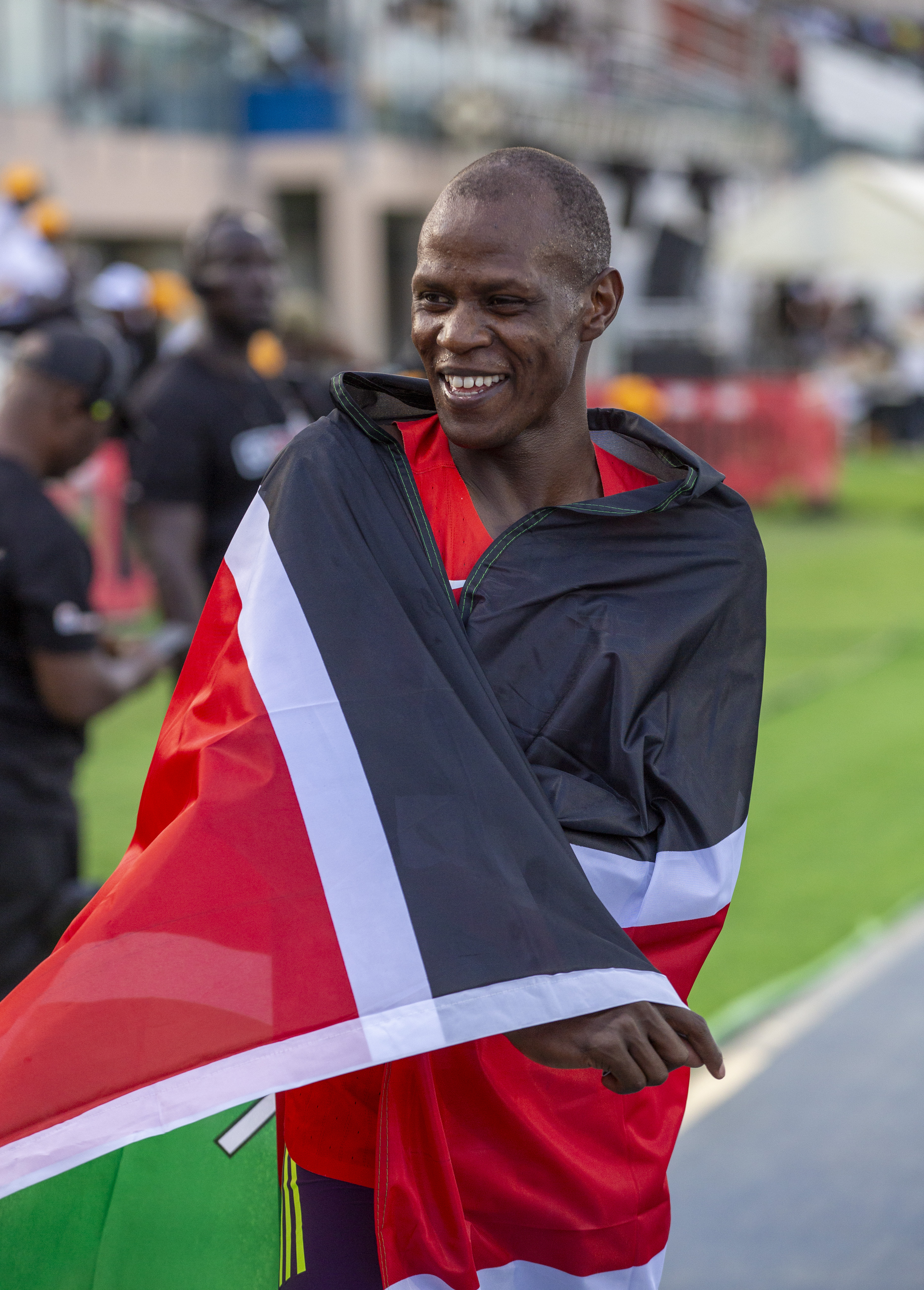
- Loti in 2026

Personal information
- Full name: Kelvin Kimtai Loti
- Nationality: Kenyan
- Born: 5 October 1999 (age 27)

Sport
- Sport: Athletics
- Event: Middle-distance running

Achievements and titles
- Personal bests: 800m: 1:43.61 (Nairobi, 2025)
Medal record
Men's Athletics
Representing Kenya
African Championships
Gold medal – first place	2026 Accra	800 m

Kelvin Kimtai Loti (born 5 October 1999) is a Kenyan middle-distance runner. He was a semi-finalist at the 2025 World Athletics Championships in the 800 metres.

== Biography ==
He won the 800 metres at the Kenyan Athletics Championships in Nairobi in June 2025, running 1:43.61. The following month, he placed second behind Nicholas Kebenei in 1:43.90 at the Athletics Kenya World Championship Trials.

He was a semi-finalist competing for Kenya at the 2025 World Athletics Championships in Tokyo, Japan, in September 2025 in the men's 800 metres.

In April 2026, Loti won the men's 800m in 1:43.63 ahead of Alex Kipngetich and Noah Kibet at the Kip Keino Classic in Nairobi. In May, he won the gold medal in the 800 metres final at the 2026 African Championships in Athletics in Accra, Ghana, running 1:45.47 to win ahead of Imade Bouchejda of Morocco and home runner Alex Amankwah. In June, he was runner-up over 800 metres to Wycliffe Kinyamal at the Kenyan Athletics Championships. He was a finalist in the 800 metres at the 2026 Commonwealth Games in Glasgow, Scotland, placing eighth overall.
