= Athletics at the 2026 Commonwealth Games – Men's 800 metres =

Men's 800 metres at the 2026 Commonwealth Games
- Venue: Scotstoun Stadium, Glasgow
- Dates: 28 July 2026 (round 1); 30 July 2026 (semi-finals); 1 August 2026 (final)
- Winning time: 1:45.33

Medalists
gold medal	Navasky Anderson	Jamaica
silver medal	Luke Boyes	Australia
bronze medal	Wyclife Kinyamal	Kenya

The men's 800 metres at the 2026 Commonwealth Games, as part of the athletics programme, took place at the Scotstoun Stadium from 28 July to 1 August 2026.

== Records ==
Prior to this competition, the existing world and Games records were as follows:

Men's 800 m
World record	1:40.91	David Rudisha (KEN)	9 Aug 2012	London, United Kingdom
Commonwealth record	1:40.91	David Rudisha (KEN)	9 Aug 2012	London, United Kingdom
Games record	1:43.22	Steve Cram (ENG)	31 Jul 1986	Edinburgh Scotland

== Schedule ==
The schedule is as follows:

Date	Time	Round
28 July 2026	11:15	Round 1
30 July 2026	20:45	Semifinals
1 August 2026	20:45	Final

All times are United Kingdom time (UTC+1)

== Results ==
=== Round 1 ===
Round 1 took place on the morning of 28 July 2026. First 3 in each heat (Q) and the next 4 fastest (q) advance to the semi-finals.

==== Heat 1 ====
Place	Athlete	Nation	Time	Notes
1	Wyclife Kinyamal	Kenya	1:46.79	Q
2	Ben Pattison	England	1:46.96	Q
3	Handal Roban	Saint Vincent and the Grenadines	1:47.28	Q
4	Jamie Phillips	Scotland	1:48.47	
5	Justin O'Toole	Canada	1:49.07	
6	Jiuteis Robinson	Papua New Guinea	1:51.61	
7	Thiruben Thana Rajan	Singapore	1:53.89	
8	Finley Cant	Gibraltar	2:01.08	SB

==== Heat 2 ====
Place	Athlete	Nation	Time	Notes
1	Kelvin Kimtai Loti	Kenya	1:47.22	Q
2	Luke Boyes	Australia	1:47.37	Q
3	Navasky Anderson	Jamaica	1:48.12	Q
4	James Preston	New Zealand	1:48.43	q
5	Sandaruwan Karunarathna	Sri Lanka	1:49.98	
6	Brandon Adolphus	Belize	1:58.39	SB
7	Nirobi Smith-Mills	Bermuda	1:59.71	
8	Stephen Rahuasi	Solomon Islands	2:00.16	

==== Heat 3 ====
Place	Athlete	Nation	Time	Notes
1	Max Burgin	England	1:46.61	Q
2	Justin Davies	Wales	1:46.98	Q
3	Peyton Craig	Australia	1:47.17	Q
4	Abdullahi Hassan	Canada	1:47.30	q
5	Nathan Cumberbatch	Trinidad and Tobago	1:48.97	
6	Jack Kinrade	Isle of Man	1:53.30	
7	Alexander Caines	Saint Kitts and Nevis	1:54.22	
8	Howard Tapuaiga Siila	Tuvalu	2:32.38	SB

==== Heat 4 ====
Place	Athlete	Nation	Time	Notes
1	Peter Bol	Australia	1:45.86	Q
2	Alex Botterill	England	1:45.92	Q
3	Kethobogile Haingura	Botswana	1:45.97	Q
4	Nicholas Kiplangat Kebenei	Kenya	1:45.99	q
5	Jared Micallef	Malta	1:46.99	q
6	Makman Yoagbati	Togo	1:49.90	
7	Eliasu Ali Jr	Turks and Caicos Islands	1:59.21	
—	Edward Sesay	Sierra Leone	DQ	TR17.2.3

=== Semi-finals ===
The semi-finals are scheduled for the evening of 30 July 2026. First 3 in each heat (Q) and the next 2 fastest (q) advance to the final.

==== Heat 1 ====
Place	Athlete	Nation	Time	Notes
1	Wyclife Kinyamal	Kenya	1:44.91	Q
2	Peter Bol	Australia	1:45.25	Q
3	Alex Botterill	England	1:45.39	Q
4	Ben Pattison	England	1:45.42	q
5	Justin Davies	Wales	1:45.51	SB
6	Kethobogile Haingura	Botswana	1:45.82	
7	Handal Roban	Saint Vincent and the Grenadines	1:45.96	
8	James Preston	New Zealand	1:48.84	

==== Heat 2 ====
Place	Athlete	Nation	Time	Notes
1	Kelvin Kimtai Loti	Kenya	1:45.09	Q
2	Luke Boyes	Australia	1:45.11	Q
3	Peyton Craig	Australia	1:45.25	Q
4	Navasky Anderson	Jamaica	1:45.38	q
5	Max Burgin	England	1:45.61	
6	Abdullahi Hassan	Canada	1:45.77	
7	Nicholas Kiplangat Kebenei	Kenya	1:47.58	
8	Jared Micallef	Malta	1:48.24	

=== Final ===
The final of the men's 800 metres is scheduled for the evening of 1 August 2026.

Place	Athlete	Nation	Time	Notes
1st place, gold medalist(s)	Navasky Anderson	Jamaica	1:45.33	
2nd place, silver medalist(s)	Luke Boyes	Australia	1:45.93	
3rd place, bronze medalist(s)	Wyclife Kinyamal	Kenya	1:46.12	
4	Ben Pattison	England	1:46.25	
5	Alex Botterill	England	1:46.26	
6	Peyton Craig	Australia	1:46.66	
7	Peter Bol	Australia	1:46.73	
8	Kelvin Kimtai Loti	Kenya	1:48.37	
