= James Preston (runner) =

New Zealand athlete (born 1997)

Personal information
- Born: 8 May 1997 (age 29) Wellington, New Zealand
- Height: 188 cm (6 ft 2 in)

Sport
- Country: New Zealand
- Sport: Athletics
- Events: 800 m; 1500 m

Achievements and titles
- National finals: 800 m champion (2021, 2022, 2023, 2024, 2026)
- Personal bests: 400 m: 47.87 (Auckland, 2022); 800 m: 1:44.04 (Pfungstadt, 2024) NR; 1500 m: 3:45.50 (Christchurch, 2021)

James Preston (born 8 May 1997) is a track and field athlete from New Zealand. He is a multiple time national champion over 800 metres and the current New Zealand record holder.

== Early and personal life ==
From Karori, he runs for Wellington Scottish Athletics Club. In 2023, Preston combined his running with a full-time work as an engineer in Wellington.

== Career ==
Preston had a breakthrough result as an 18 year-old when he won the 800m at the Porritt Classic in New Zealand in February 2016, beating New Zealand champions Brad Mathas and Hamish Carson, and breaking his personal best by three seconds.

In March 2022, Preston won his second New Zealand national title over 800 metres. In July 2022, he became the third fastest 800m New Zealand athlete in history, behind Peter Snell and John Walker, when he ran 1:45.30 in Germany.

In February 2023, Preston won the 800m at the World Athletics Continental Tour Gold Meet in Melbourne in a world-leading time. A few weeks later he claimed this third national 800m title. At the 2023 World Athletics Championships in Budapest, he did not qualify for the semi-finals of the 800m.

He ran a national record indoor time of 1:47.59 in the 800 metres at the 2024 World Athletics Indoor Championships in Glasgow.

At the 2024 New Zealand Track & Field Championships Preston ran 1:44.87 to become the second fastest New Zealander ever over the distance behind Peter Snell and ahead of John Walker. On 25 May of that year, in Pfungstadt, Germany, Preston broke Snell's 62-year-old New Zealand national record in the 800m, the oldest athletics record in New Zealand and one of the oldest in the world.

He competed in the 800 metres at the 2024 Summer Olympics in Paris in August 2024.

Preston qualified for the final of the 800 metres at the 2026 New Zealand Athletics Championships in Auckland, running 1:53.53, before winning for final the following day in 1:46.58. He was a semi-finalist in the 800 metres at the 2026 Commonwealth Games in Glasgow, Scotland.
