= General Ayansa =

Ethiopian athlete (born 2005)

Personal information
- Born: General Berhanu Ayansa; 28 January 2005 (age 21)

Sport
- Sport: Athletics
- Event: Middle distance running

Achievements and titles
- Personal best(s): 800m: 1:44.60 (2025)
Medal record
Men's athletics
Representing ETH
World U20 Championships
| Gold medal – first place | 2024 Lima | 800 m |

General Berhanu Ayansa (born 28 January 2005) is an Ethiopian middle-distance runner. He won a gold medal at the 2024 World Athletics U20 Championships over 800 metres.

== Career ==
He won a gold medal in Lima, Peru at the 2024 World Athletics U20 Championships over 800 metres in August 2024, ahead of Peyton Craig of Australia.

He ran 1:44.60 for the 800 metres in Troyes, France in June 2025. In July 2025, he was provisionally named in the senior Ethiopian team for the 800 metres at the 2025 World Athletics Championships in Tokyo, Japan, via the rankings quota.
