= Henry Jonas =

British athlete (born 2005)

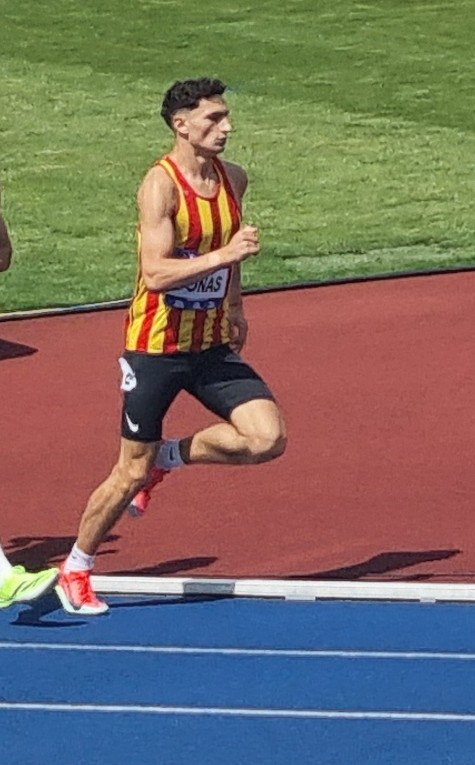
- 2025 UK Athletics Championships

Personal information
- Born: 8 June 2005 (age 21)

Sport
- Sport: Athletics
- Event: Middle distance running

Achievements and titles
- Personal bests: 800m: 1:44.10 (Bergen, 2025); 1500m: 3:36.03 (London, 2025)

Henry Jonas (born 8 June 2005) is a British middle-distance runner.

== Early life ==
He is from East Runton, Norfolk, and won competing for Norfolk in the senior boys' 800 metres at the English Schools championships in June 2023. That year, he began to study engineering at Loughborough University.

== Career ==
He won the England Indoor U19 800 metres title on 11 February 2024 in a time of 1:53.84. He won the silver medal at the British Universities and Colleges Sport (BUCS) Indoor Championships in 1:51.84, two weeks later. He then won the BUCS outdoor 800 metres title in 1:49.32. In May 2024, he lowered his personal best for the 800 metres to 1:47.44. He won the England Athletics National Championship in Birmingham over 800 metres prior to being selected for the 2024 World Athletics U20 Championships in Lima, Peru, where he was a semi-finalist in the men's 800m.

He finished runner-up to Justin Davies over 800m at the Belfast Irish Milers Meet in May 2025, in a personal best time of 1:44.72, to move into the top-ten on the UK U23 all-time list. That month, he set a personal best over 1500 metres in Brussels, Belgium, running a time of 3:38.73. He set a meeting record of 1:45.25 for the 800 metres in July 2025 in Cork, Ireland. He was named in the British team for 800 metres at the 2025 European Athletics U23 Championships in Bergen, running a new personal best of 1:44.10 to finish ahead of Niels Laros in the preliminary round, with the time being under the championship record set by Nils Schumann in 1999. In the final, he placed fifth overall just 0.19 seconds from the medal places.

On 2 August, he qualified for the final of the 800 metres at the 2025 UK Athletics Championships in Birmingham. In October 2025, he was named on the British Athletics Olympic Futures Programme for 2025/26.

Jonas placed third in the 1500 metres at the 2026 British Indoor Athletics Championships in Birmingham on 15 February 2026. In May, he won the 800m in 1:45.76 at The Belfast Classic. Jonas was third in 1:46.25 in the 800 m at the Irena Szewińska Memorial in Bydgoszcz, Poland on 29 May. In June, he qualified for the final of the 800 metres at the 2026 British Championships, placing fourth overall. The following month, he won over 800 m in 1:46.31 at the Morton Games in Dublin. He ran a season's best for the 800 metres of 1:45.26 at the 2026 London Athletics Meet on 18 July. He placed second in 3:52.94 at the Monument Mile Classic in Stirling, Scotland, in September 2026. In October 2026, he was retained on the 2026/27 Olympic Futures Programme awarded by UK Athletics.
