= Nicholas Kebenei =

Kenyan athlete (born 1995)

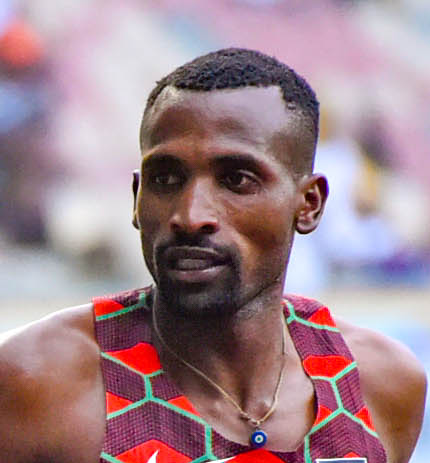

Personal information
- Full name: Nicholas Kiplangat Kebenei
- Nationality: Kenyan
- Born: 7 June 1995 (age 31)

Sport
- Sport: Athletics
- Events: 800m, 1500m

Achievements and titles
- Personal bests: 800m: 1:43.54 (Nairobi, 2025); 1500m: 3:46.21 (Douala, 2024)
Medal record
Men's athletics
Representing Kenya
African Championships
Silver medal – second place	2022 Port Louis	800 m

Nicholas Kiplangat Kebenei (born 7 June 1995) is a Kenyan middle-distance runner. He was a silver medalist at the 2022 African Championships in Athletics over 800 metres.

== Biography ==
He was runner-up over 800 metres at the Kenyan Athletics Championships in April 2022. He was a silver medalist at the 2022 African Championships in Athletics in St. Pierre, Mauritius with a time of 1:46.43.

He was a finalist in the 800 metre at the Kenyan Olympic trials in June 2024. That month, he ran a personal best 3:46.21 for the 1500 metres at the African Athletics Championships in Douala, Cameroon.

In May 2025, he won the 800 metres UAE Athletics Grand Prix 2025 in Dubai in 1:45.38 in May 2025. He ran a new personal best of 1:43.75 seconds to finish runner-up behind Jonah Koech over 800 metres at the Kip Keino Classic in Nairobi on 31 May 2025. In June 2025, he made his debut in the 2025 Diamond League over 800 metres, running 1:45.03 at the 2025 Meeting de Paris. The following month, he won at the Athletics Kenya World Championship Trials ahead of Kelvin Loti. He was a semi-finalist at the 2025 World Athletics Championships in Tokyo, Japan, in September 2025 in the men's 800 metres.

In June 2026, he was third over 800 metres behind Wycliffe Kinyamal and Kelvin Loti at the Kenyan Athletics Championships. He was a semi-finalist in the 800 metres at the 2026 Commonwealth Games in Glasgow, Scotland.
