= Justin Davies (runner) =

British athlete (born 2003)

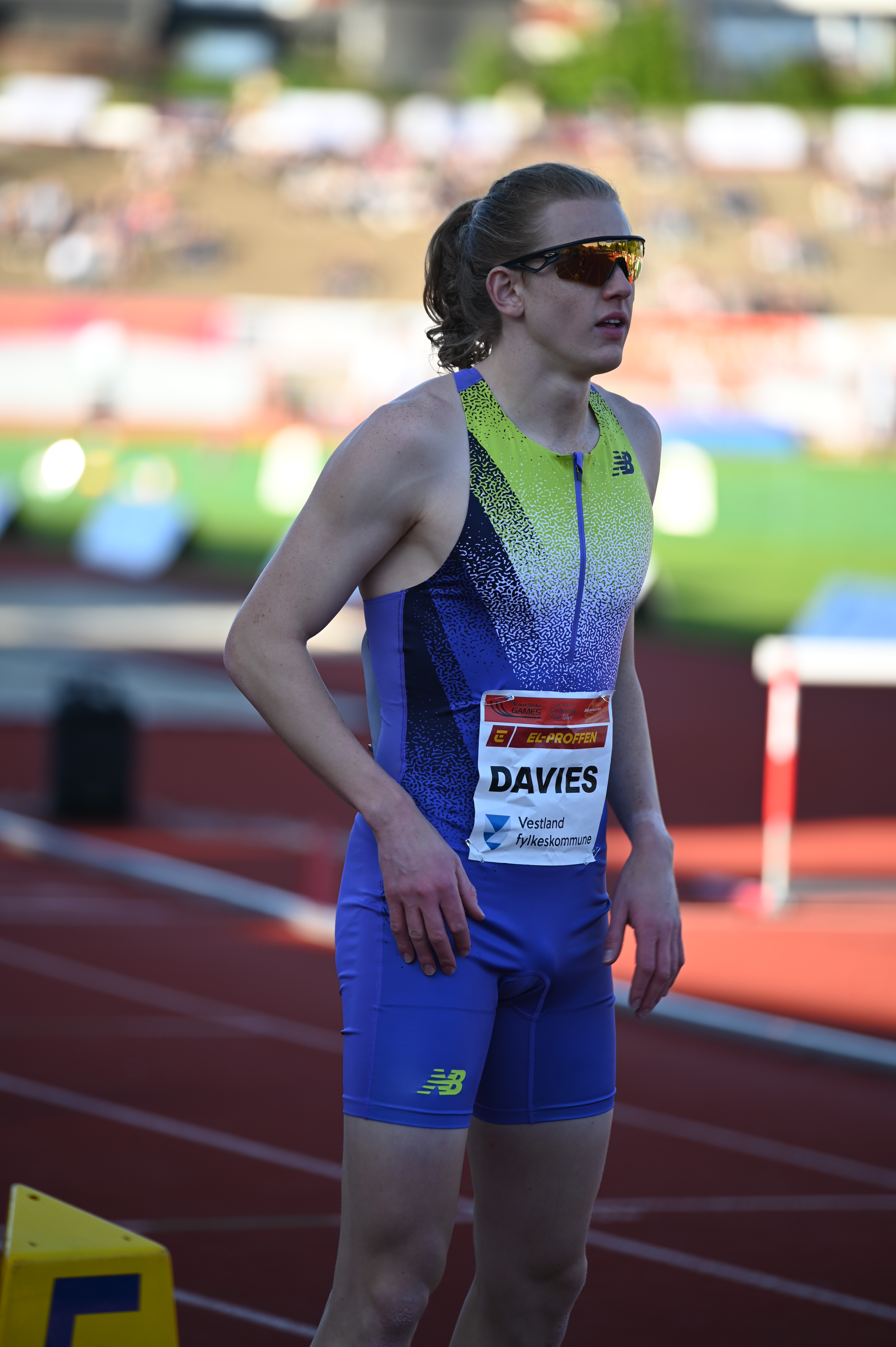
- Justin Davies in 2026

Personal information
- Nationality: British (Welsh)
- Born: 6 February 2003 (age 23)

Sport
- Sport: Athletics
- Event: Middle distance running

Achievements and titles
- Personal bests: 800m: 1:44.35 (Belfast, 2025); 1500m: 3:43.62 (Birmingham, 2022)
Medal record
Men's athletics
Representing Great Britain
European U23 Championships
Silver medal – second place	2025 Bergen	800m

Justin Davies (born 6 February 2003) is a Welsh middle-distances runner. He won the 2025 British Indoor Athletics Championships over 800 metres and is the Welsh indoor record holder over that distance.

== Biography ==
He began to be coached by Martin Rush in Bath, from the age of ten years-old. He represented Great Britain as a junior at the Loughborough International but a series of injuries led him and Rush to limit the amount of training hours he would complete in a week. He was part of the British team that won a silver medal at the 2022 World University Cross Country Championships in the mixed relay, alongside Alexandra Millard, Edward Potter and Sabrina Sinha.

He was a bronze medalist over 800 metres at the 2024 British Indoor Athletics Championships. In Watford in August 2024, he lowered his 800 metres personal best to 1:45.37 at the British Milers Club Gold Standard meeting at Watford. It was the third personal best time he had run that season, and moved into the top-ten British all-time list. He was selected to join the Welsh Athletics performance pathway in 2024.

In January 2025, he lowered his 800 metres indoor personal best to 1:46.94 in Sabadell, Spain. At the Keely Klassic in Birmingham on 15 February 2025, he ran 1:45.78 in the 800m indoors and broke the Welsh record which had been held by Joe Thomas since 2012. It also moved him to seventh on the all-time British list. He won the final of the 800 metres at the 2025 British Indoor Athletics Championships in Birmingham, on 23 February 2025 in a time of 1:47.26.

He was selected for the British team for the 2025 European Athletics Indoor Championships in Apeldoorn. At the Games, he qualified for the semi-finals where he placed sixth in his race in 1:47.17.

In May 2025, he lowered his personal best to 1:44.35 in winning the Belfast Milers event in Northern Ireland. He ran 1:44.87 to win ahead of Algeria's Slimane Moula in the 800 metres at the World Athletics Continental Tour Gold meeting in Zagreb on 24 May 2025. He was named in the British team for the 2025 European Athletics U23 Championships in Bergen, where he ran 1:44.67 to qualify for the final, his time under the championship record set by Nils Schumann in 1999. He won a silver medal in the final behind Niels Laros of the Netherlands.

On 2 August, he qualified for the final of the 800 metres at the 2025 UK Athletics Championships in Birmingham. In October 2025, he was named on the British Athletics Olympic Futures Programme for 2025/26.

Davies ran a season's best for the 800 metres of 1:45.99 at the 2026 London Athletics Meet on 18 July. He was a semi-finalist competing for Wales in the 800 metres at the 2026 Commonwealth Games in Glasgow, Scotland.

== Personal life ==
He attended King Edward's School, Bath. He studies biomedical sciences at the University of Bath.
