= Elias Ngeny =

Kenyan middle-distance runner (born 1996)

Personal information
- Native name: Elias Ng'eny
- Nationality: Kenya
- Born: 4 May 1996 (age 30)
- Home town: Kaptagat, Kenya
- Height: 183 cm (6 ft 0 in)
- Weight: 73 kg (161 lb)

Sport
- Sport: Sport of athletics
- Events: 800 metres 1500 metres

Achievements and titles
- National finals: 2019 Kenyan Champs; • 800m, 10th; 2022 Kenyan Champs; • 800m, 3rd (bronze); 2023 Kenyan Champs; • 800m, 5th
- Personal bests: 800m: 1:43.84 (2021) 1500m: 3:42.69 (2022)
- Updated on 4 April 2024

Elias Ngeny (born 4 May 1996) is a Kenyan middle-distance runner specializing in the 800 metres. He finished 5th in the 800 m at the 2022 African Games, and in 2021 he was once the world leader with a 1:43.84 personal best.

== Career ==
Ngeny made his first international team at the 2022 African Championships in Athletics, where he competed in the 800 m and the 1500 m. He led the first-round qualifiers in the 800 m and finished 5th in the finals, and in the 1500 m he qualified for the finals but did not finish the race.

Later that season at the 2022 Commonwealth Games, Ngeny placed 3rd in his 800 m semi-final and did not qualify for the finals.

== Personal life ==
Ngeny trains in Kaptagat. After initially seeking a track and field scholarship in the NCAA, the 2020 COVID-19 lockdowns drove Ngeny to run professionally instead. He drew inspiration from Emmanuel Korir. He trains with Wycliffe Kinyamal.

== Statistics ==
=== Personal best progression ===
800m progression
| # | Mark | Pl. | Competition | Venue | Date | Ref. |
|---|---|---|---|---|---|---|
| 1 | 1:49.44 A | 6th (Heat 4) | Kenyan Athletics Championships | Nairobi, Kenya | 20 Jun 2018 | |
| 2 | 1:49.23 A | 4th (Semifinal 3) | Kenyan Athletics Championships | Nairobi, Kenya | 20 Aug 2019 | |
| 3 | 1:47.68 A | 4th (Round B) | | Nairobi, Kenya | 5 Feb 2021 | |
| 4 | 1:46.57 A | (gold) (Semifinal 2) | AK Track and Field Weekend Meet | Nairobi, Kenya | 11 Mar 2021 | |
| 5 | 1:43.84 A | 1st place, gold medalist(s) | Pre-Trials | Nairobi, Kenya | 28 May 2021 | |
