= 2024 World Athletics Indoor Championships – Men's 800 metres =

Men's 800 metres at the 2024 World Athletics Indoor Championships
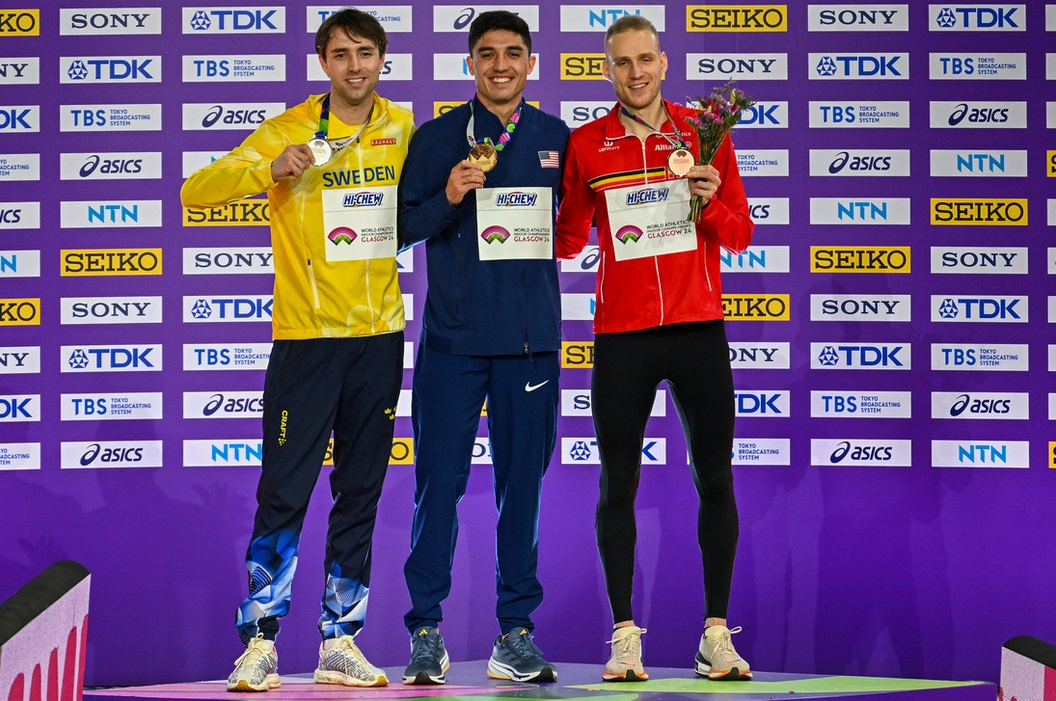
- Venue: Commonwealth Arena
- Dates: 1–3 March
- Competitors: 27 from 21 nations
- Winning time: 1:44.92 WL

Medalists
gold medal	Bryce Hoppel	United States
silver medal	Andreas Kramer	Sweden
bronze medal	Eliott Crestan	Belgium

The men's 800 metres at the 2024 World Athletics Indoor Championships took place on 1–3 March 2024.

== Results ==
=== Heats ===
Qualification: First 2 in each heat (Q) and the next 2 fastest (q) advance to the Semi−Finals

The heats were started at 12:16.

==== Heat 1 ====
Rank	Athlete	Nation	Time	Notes
1	Mohamed Ali Gouaned	Algeria	1:46.49	Q
2	Tshepiso Masalela	Botswana	1:46.76	Q
3	Collins Kipruto	Kenya	1:46.89	SB
4	James Preston	New Zealand	1:47.59	NR
5	Mateusz Borkowski	Poland	1:48.07	

==== Heat 2 ====
Rank	Athlete	Nation	Time	Notes
1	Bryce Hoppel	United States	1:46.15	Q
2	Abdelati El Guesse	Morocco	1:46.29	Q
3	Noah Kibet	Kenya	1:46.90	
4	Francesco Pernici	Italy	1:47.38	PB
5	Edose Ibadin	Nigeria	1:48.21	SB

==== Heat 3 ====
Rank	Athlete	Nation	Time	Notes
1	Eliott Crestan	Belgium	1:46.79	Q
2	Catalin Tecuceanu	Italy	1:47.07	Q
3	Balázs Vindics	Hungary	1:47.83	SB
4	John Rivera	Puerto Rico	1:48.44	
5	Husain Mohsin Al-Farsi	Oman	1:48.47	NR
6	Eduardo Moreira	Brazil	1:49.74	PB

==== Heat 4 ====
Rank	Athlete	Nation	Time	Notes
1	Mohamed Attaoui	Spain	1:46.20	Q
2	Andreas Kramer	Sweden	1:46.21	Q, SB
3	Tibo De Smet	Belgium	1:46.34	q, SB
4	Jakub Dudycha	Czech Republic	1:47.81	
5	Efrem Mekonnen	Ethiopia	1:49.71	
6	Marino Bloudek	Croatia	1:49.97	

==== Heat 5 ====
Rank	Athlete	Nation	Time	Notes
1	Mariano García	Spain	1:45.81	Q
2	Isiah Harris	United States	1:46.12	Q, SB
3	Benjamin Robert	France	1:46.16	q
4	Ryan Clarke	Netherlands	1:46.69	
5	Filip Šnejdr	Czech Republic	1:48.30	

=== Semi-finals ===
Qualification: First 3 in each heat (Q) advance to the Final

The heats were started on 2 March at 12:30.

==== Heat 1 ====
Rank	Athlete	Nation	Time	Notes
1	Mariano García	Spain	1:47.83	Q
2	Catalin Tecuceanu	Italy	1:48.13	Q
3	Andreas Kramer	Sweden	1:48.14	Q
4	Isiah Harris	United States	1:48.18	
5	Tshepiso Masalela	Botswana	1:48.44	
6	Tibo De Smet	Belgium	1:48.47	

==== Heat 2 ====
Rank	Athlete	Nation	Time	Notes
1	Bryce Hoppel	United States	1:45.08 [.072]	Q, PB
2	Eliott Crestan	Belgium	1:45.08 [.076]	Q, PB
3	Benjamin Robert	France	1:45.28	Q, PB
4	Abdelati El Guesse	Morocco	1:45.45	
5	Mohamed Attaoui	Spain	1:45.68	
—	Mohamed Ali Gouaned	Algeria	DNF	

=== Final ===
The final was started on 3 March at 21:10.

Rank	Athlete	Nation	Time	Notes
1st place, gold medalist(s)	Bryce Hoppel	United States	1:44.92	WL
2nd place, silver medalist(s)	Andreas Kramer	Sweden	1:45.27	SB
3rd place, bronze medalist(s)	Eliott Crestan	Belgium	1:45.32	
4	Catalin Tecuceanu	Italy	1:46.39	
5	Mariano García	Spain	1:48.77	
—	Benjamin Robert	France	DQ	TR17.2.4 (Note: Infringement of the inside border.)
