= Navasky Anderson =

Jamaican athlete

Personal information
- Nationality: Jamaica
- Born: 21 January 2000 (age 26)
- Height: 6 ft 4 in (193 cm)

Sport
- Sport: Track and Field
- Event: 800m
- University team: Mississippi State Bulldogs
- Club: District Track Club
- Coached by: Tom Brumlik

Achievements and titles
- Personal bests: Outdoor; 400 m: 49.68 (West Chester 2019); 800 m: 1:42.76 (Tokyo 2025) NR; 1500 m: 3:46.82 (Baton Rouge 2022); Indoor; 400 m: 49.59 (New York 2020); 800 m: 1:44.75 (Toruń 2026) NR; Mile: 4:05.63 (Clemson 2023); 3000 m: 7:55.12 (Ghent 2021)
Medal record
Men's athletics
Representing Jamaica
Commonwealth Games
Gold medal – first place	2026 Glasgow	800 m
Pan American Games
Bronze medal – third place	2023 Santiago	800 m

Navasky Anderson (born 21 January 2000) is a Jamaican middle-distance runner. He is the Jamaican national record holder over 800 metres and won the gold medal at the 2026 Commonwealth Games.

He represented Jamaica in the 800m at the 2022 and 2025 World Athletics Championships, and 2024 Olympic Games. He finished seventh at the 2025 World Championships.

== Early life ==
Born in Kingston, Jamaica, he attended St. Jago High School before moving to the United States. He attended Essex County College before starting at Mississippi State University in 2020.

== 2022 ==
CAREER

Anderson ran 1:45.02 at the NCAA Championships final at Hayward Field to break the Jamaican national record over 800 metres and finish runner-up to Moad Zahafi in June 2022. He was subsequently called up to represent his country at the 2022 World Athletics Championships held in Eugene. He finished seventh in his heat at the Championships.

Anderson made his first senior final at the 2022 Commonwealth Games in the 800 metres, held in Birmingham, England. He finished fifth in the final running 1:48.75.

== 2023 ==
Anderson lowered the Jamaican 800m indoor record in February 2023 at the Music City Challenge at Vanderbilt University in Nashville, United States, running a time of 1:46.58.

On 30 July, Anderson lowered his own Jamaican 800m record to 1:44.70. At the 2023 World Athletics Championships in Budapest, Anderson competed in the 800m. He won bronze at the 2023 Pan American Games in Santiago, Chile in November 2023.

== 2024 ==
He competed in the 800 metres at the 2024 Summer Olympics in Paris in August 2024.

== 2025 ==
In June 2025, he lowered the Jamaican national record for the 800 metres to 1:44.61 in Baltimore. He finished runner-up in the 800 metres final at the 2025 Jamaican Athletics Championships in 1:46.03. He won the 800 metres at the Sunset Tour Los Angeles on 12 July 2025 in 1:44.40. He was named in the Jamaican squad for the 2025 NACAC Championships in Nassau, The Bahamas, running 1:44.18.

He was a finalist at the 2025 World Athletics Championships in Tokyo, Japan, in September 2025 in the men's 800 metres, breaking the national record twice. In the semi-finals he ran a new personal best and national record of 1:43.72 to become the first Jamaican man to qualify for the final of the event, before lowering the national record to 1:42.76 as he finished in seventh place overall. It was the first 800m race in history in which all eight competitors ran under 1:43.00.

== 2026 ==
Anderson ran a new Jamaican indoor record of 1:46.10 for the 800 metres in February 2026. However, that record was broken only a few days later by Rivaldo Marshall. On 22 February, Anderson improved the national indoor record to 1:44.75 at the Copernicus Cup in Toruń. He reached the semi-finals representing Jamaica over 800 m at the 2026 World Athletics Indoor Championships in Toruń, Poland. On 6 June 2026, Anderson won the 800 metres at the USATF Lone Star Grand Prix in College Station, Texas. That month, he won the senior national title over 800 metres at the 2026 Jamaican Championships. On 1 August, he ran 1:45.33 to win the gold medal at the 2026 Commonwealth Games in Scotland. In September, he competed over 800 m at the inaugural World Ultimate Championship in Budapest.
