= Slimane Moula =

Algerian runner (born 1999)

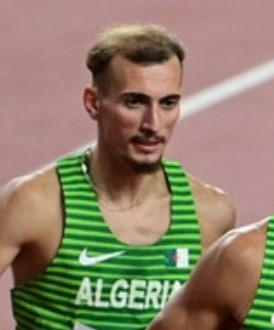
- Moula at the 2023 World Athletics Championships in the 800 metres final

Personal information
- Born: 25 February 1999 (age 27) Draâ Ben Khedda, Algeria

Sport
- Sport: Athletics
- Event: 800 metres
- Coached by: Nabil Madi

Achievements and titles
- Highest world ranking: 3 (800m)
- Personal bests: 400 m: 45.96 (Jesolo 2018); 800 m: 1:42.77 (Stockholm 2025); 1000 metres: 2:19.19 (Algiers 2022)
Medal record
Athletics
Representing Algeria
African Championships
Gold medal – first place	2022 Port Louis	800 m
Mediterranean Games
Gold medal – first place	2022 Oran	4 × 400 m relay
Military World Games
Bronze medal – third place	2019 Wuhan	4 × 400 m relay
Mediterranean U23 Championships
Bronze medal – third place	2018 Jesolo	400 m

Slimane Moula (Arabic: سليمان مولا, born 25 February 1999) is an Algerian middle-distance runner specialising in the 800 metres.

His personal best in the event is 1:43.38, set at the Meeting de Paris in June 2023. He was the 2022 African Champion in the 800 m, and won the event at the BAUHAUS-galan Diamond League meet in Stockholm the same year. He qualified for the finals of the 800 metres at both the 2022 and 2023 World Athletics Championships, placing 5th both years.

Moula won his second Diamond League event at the 2023 Doha meet.
