= Tshepiso Masalela =

Botswana athlete (born 1999)

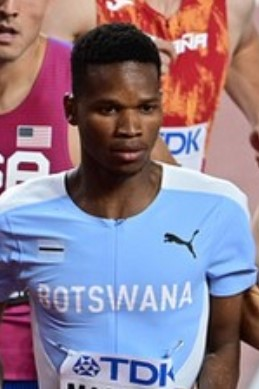
- Masalela at the 2023 World Athletics Championships in the 800 metres final

Personal information
- Nationality: Botswana
- Born: 25 May 1999 (age 27)

Sport
- Sport: Athletics
- Events: 800m, 1500m

Achievements and titles
- Personal bests: 800 m: 1:42.70 (Rabat 2025); 1500 m: 3:30.71 NR (Cape Town 2025)
Medal record
Men's athletics
Representing Botswana
African Championships
| Bronze medal – third place | 2022 Port Louis | 800 m |

Tshepiso Masalela (born 25 May 1999) is a middle-distance runner from Botswana. He is a multiple-time national champion in the 800 metres and 1500 metres. He was a finalist over 800 metres at the 2024 Olympic Games and 2025 World Championships.

== Biography ==
Masalela is a native of Maun, Botswana. At the 2022 African Championships he won his heat in the 800 metres in 1:48.69. He followed this up by winning the bronze medal in the final. In 2023, he lowered his 800 meters personal best to 1:45.24. At the 2023 World Athletics Championships in Budapest, he qualified for the finals of the 800m, placing 6th.

In February 2024, Masalela set a national indoor record of 1:45.56 for the 800 metres in Metz. He ran at the 2024 World Indoors Athletics Championships in Glasgow where he reached the semi-finals. In April 2024 he came third in the 800 meters during the 2024 Diamond League Xiamen meeting and set a new PB of 1:43.88. He finished fourth in the 800 meters at the 2024 Meeting International Mohammed VI d'Athlétisme in May and third at the 2024 BAUHAUS-galan Diamond League event in Stockholm.

He competed in the 800 metres at the 2024 Summer Olympics in Paris in August 2024, placing seventh in the final, and running a personal best time of 1:42.82.

On 12 April 2025, he finished runner up over 800m to Kethobogile Haingura on the World Athletics Continental tour in Gaborone. In May 2025, he won the 800 metres race at the 2025 Doha Diamond League, running an early world leading time of 1:43.11. The following week, he lowered his early world leading time to win the 2025 Meeting International Mohammed VI d'Athlétisme de Rabat ahead of Max Burgin and Emmanuel Wanyonyi. He placed fifth over 800 metres at the Diamond League Final in Zurich on 28 August.

Masalela was a finalist at the 2025 World Athletics Championships in Tokyo, Japan, in September 2025 in the men's 800 metres, running 1:42.77 in the final, the first 800m race in history in which all eight competitors ran under 1:43.

Competing indoors over 1500 metres for the first time on 22 February 2026 at the Copernicus Cup in Toruń, Masalela won in 3:32.55 ahead of Azeddine Habz by just 0.01 at the finish, setting a national indoor record. However, Masalela was later disqualified giving Habz the victory, having been adjudged to have made an unsportsmanlike gesture as he crossed the finishing line. In August, he was a finalist in the mile run at the 2026 Commonwealth Games in Scotland.
