= Matthew McKenna =

British athlete (born 2007)

Personal information
- Nationality: British (Scottish)
- Born: 16 June 2007 (age 19)

Sport
- Sport: Athletics
- Event: Middle distance

Achievements and titles
- Personal bests: 800m: 1:46.84 (Watford, 2024); 1500m: 3:47.61 (Loughborough, 2024); Indoor; 800m: 1:47.19 (Glasgow, 2026) NU20R
Medal record
Men's athletics
Representing GBR
European U18 Championships
Gold medal – first place	2024 Banska Bystrica	800m

Matthew McKenna (born 16 June 2007) is a British middle-distance runner. He is the British under-20 record holder for the 800 metres.

== Biography ==
In 2024, McKenna won the gold medal at the 2024 European Athletics U18 Championships over 800 metres in Banska Bystrica, Slovakia.

At the British Milers Club in Watford on 21 August 2024, McKenna ran a personal best time of 1:46.84 for the 800 metres which placed him second on the European U18 800m all-time list behind Max Burgin. In October 2024, he was nominated by Athletics Weekly for best British male junior.

On 31 January 2026, McKenna set a British under-20 indoor record with 1:48.20 for the 800 metres in Glasgow, surpassing the David Sharpe 40-year-old mark from 1986. He was a finalist over 800 metres at the 2026 British Indoor Athletics Championships in Birmingham on 14 February 2026, placing sixth overall. On 1 March in Glasgow, McKenna lowered his British under-20 800m record with 1:47.19. He was named in the GB & NI U20 team for the 2026 Loughborough International in May 2026, winning the 800 metres race in 1:52.17. In July, McKenna won the England Athletics U20 Championships over 800 metres in 1:49.24. He was selected as part of the Great Britain team to compete at the 2026 World Athletics U20 Championships, reaching the semi-finals and narrowly missing out on a place in the final by a single second.

== Personal life ==
McKenna lived in Aberdeen prior to moving to England. He often runs wearing a backwards baseball cap.
