= Bob Abdelrahim =

Australian middle-distance runner (born 2006)

Personal information
- Born: 16 March 2006 (age 20)

Sport
- Sport: Athletics
- Event: Middle-distance running

Achievements and titles
- Personal best(s): 400m: 50.78 (Melbourne, 2025); 800m: 1:44.27 (Perth, 2026); 1500m: 3:57.15 (Perth, 2022)

Bob Abdelrahim (born 16 March 2006) is an Australian middle-distance runner, who competes primarily over 800 metres.

== Biography ==
Abdelrahim became Australian junior 800 metres champion in April 2025, winning in a time of 1:48.37. On 7 February 2026, Abdelrahim ran the fastest ever 800m at a Victorian Milers Club meet with a time of 1:46.48. A training partner of Peter Bol under track coach Justin Rinaldi, Abdelrahim finished runner-up to Bol in the 800 metres at the Perth Track Classic on 14 February 2026, running 1:44.27 to meet the qualifying standard for the 2026 Commonwealth Games. It over two seconds better than his previous process which he had set just the week before, and placed him fourth on the Australian all-time list. Later that month, Abdelrahim also placed second behind Bol in the 800 metres at the Hobart Track Classic in Tasmania.

Abdelrahim competed in the 800 m at the 2026 World Athletics Indoor Championships in Toruń, Poland in March 2026. The following month, he placed third behind Bol and Luke Boyes in the 800 metres final at the 2026 Australian Championships.
