= Peyton Craig =

Australian athlete

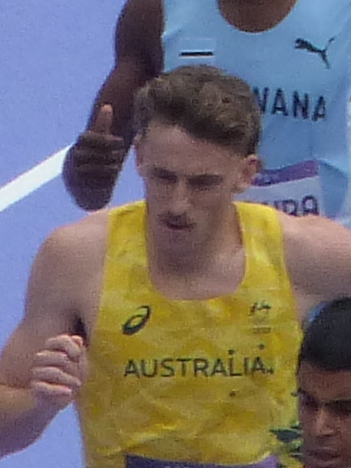
- Craig at the 2024 Summer Olympics

Personal information
- Born: 28 March 2005 (age 21) Gladstone, Queensland, Australia
- Height: 1.80 m (5 ft 11 in)

Sport
- Country: Australia
- Sport: Athletics
- Event: Middle distance running

Achievements and titles
- Personal bests: 800m: 1:44.01 (Rome, 2026); 1500m: 3:44.07 (Brisbane, 2022); Mile: 4:12.05 (Melbourne, 2024); 3000m: 8:12.63 (Sydney, 2022)
Medal record
Men's athletics
Representing Australia
Oceania Championships
Gold medal – first place	2024 Suva	800 m
World U20 Championships
Silver medal – second place	2024 Lima	800 m

Peyton Craig (born 28 March 2005) is an Australian track and field athlete who competes in middle distance running.

== Early life ==
From Boyne Island in Queensland, Craig excelled at a number of sports, competing in swimming and triathlon as well as Rugby League and cricket. As a 10-year-old, he won a national 100m breaststroke swimming title. As a 17-year-old he finished eighth at the World Triathlon Sprint and Relay Championships.

== Career ==
He is a member of the Oceania branch of On Athletics Club (OAC) where he is coached by Brendan Mallyon (QLD) and assisted by Craig Mottram. He competed at the World Athletics U20 Championships in Cali, Colombia in 2022 over 1500 metres.

He won the 2023 de Castella 3000m in 8:18.17 in December 2023 in Melbourne.

He lowered his 800m personal best from 1:47.52 to 1:45.77 at the ACT State Championships on Australia Day 2024, a new Australia U20 record. The following week, he won the Adelaide Invitational and lowered his personal best to 1.45.41. At the Australian Athletics Championships in Adelaide in April 2024, he finished third in the men's 800 metres race.

In June 2024, he won the gold medal at the 2024 Oceania Athletics Championships in Fiji over 800 metres finishing ahead of Australian champion Luke Boyes by 6 hundredths of a second. That month, he set a new personal best and met the qualifying standard for the 2024 Paris Olympics, running 1:44.12 in Vienna.

He competed in the 800 metres at the 2024 Summer Olympics in Paris in August 2024, running a personal best of 1:44.11 and reaching the semi-finals.

Craig won the silver medal in the 800 metres at the 2024 World Athletics U20 Championships in Lima, Peru in August 2024.

He finished runner-up to Peter Bol at the Australian Athletics Championships in Perth on 13 April 2025, in a 800m personal best of 1:44.07. He competed at the 2025 World Athletics Championships in Tokyo, Japan, in September 2025 in the men's 800 metres, running 1:45.44 without advancing to the semi-finals.

On 4 June 2026, he ran a personal best 1:44.01 for the 800 metres at the 2026 Golden Gala in Rome. He was a finalist in the 800 metres at the 2026 Commonwealth Games in Glasgow, Scotland, placing sixth overall.
