= Alex Amankwah =

Ghanaian middle-distance runner

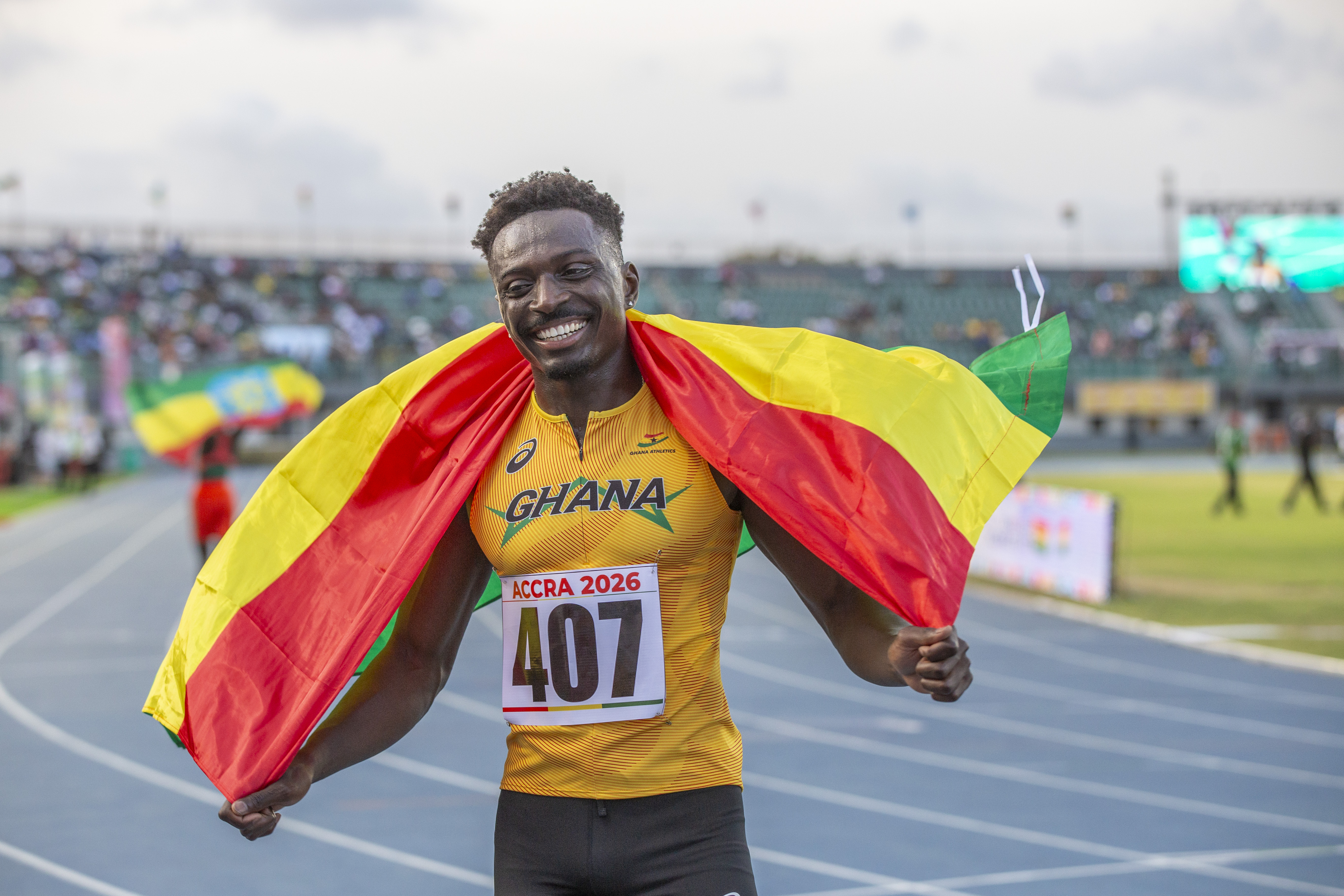
- Alex Amankwah at the 2026 African Athletics Championships

Personal information
- Born: 2 March 1992 (age 34) Accra, Ghana
- Education: University of Alabama
- Height: 6 ft 0 in (183 cm)
- Weight: 150 lb (68 kg)

Sport
- Sport: Athletics
- Events: 400 m, 800 m
- College team: Alabama Crimson Tide
Medal record
Men's Athletics
Representing Ghana
African Championships
Bronze medal – third place	2026 Accra	800 m

Alex Amankwah (born 2 March 1992) is a Ghanaian middle-distance runner specialising in the 800 metres. He attended college and competed in athletics at the University of Alabama, where he set a school record and was a First Team All-American in the indoor 800 metres. He qualified for the 800 metres at the 2015 World Championships in Beijing, China but was unable to compete due to visa issues. He also represented Ghana in the 4 × 400 metres relay at the 2015 African Games.

Amankwah represented Ghana in the 800 metres at the 2016 Summer Olympics in Rio de Janeiro, Brazil. Amankwah represented Ghana in the 800 metres at the 2025 World Athletics Championships in Tokyo.

== Competition record ==
Year	Competition	Venue	Position	Event	Notes
Representing Ghana
2015	African Games	Brazzaville, Republic of the Congo	5th	4 × 400 m relay	3:05.15
2016	Olympic Games	Rio de Janeiro, Brazil	47th (h)	800 m	1:50.33
2017	World Championships	London, United Kingdom	32nd (h)	800 m	1:47.56
2018	Commonwealth Games	Gold Coast, Australia	11th (h)	800 m	1:47.80
2022	World Indoor Championships	Belgrade, Serbia	20th (h)	800 m	1:49.96
2022	World Championships	Eugene, United States	–	800 m	DQ
2024	African Games	Accra, Ghana	5th	800 m	1:46.53
2025	World Championships	Tokyo, Japan	50th (h)	800 m	1:47.12
2026	African Championships	Accra, Ghana	3rd	800 m	1:46.18

== Personal bests ==
Outdoor

- 800 metres – 1:44.71 (George Mason Stadium, Fairfax VA, 12 AUG 2024)
- 600 metres – 1:15.88 (Franklin Field, Philadelphia, PA 30 APR 2022)
- 400 metres – 46.34 (Tallahassee FL, 25 March 2016)

Indoor

- 800 metres – 1:45.82 (Fort Washington Avenue Armory, New York City, NY 8 FEB 2025)
- 600 metres – 1:14.90 (Ashenfelter Indoor Track, State College, PA 31 JAN 2025)

== Coaching career ==
Amankwah signed with Athletes Untapped as a private track and field coach on February 12, 2025.
