= Niels Laros =

Dutch athlete (born 2005)

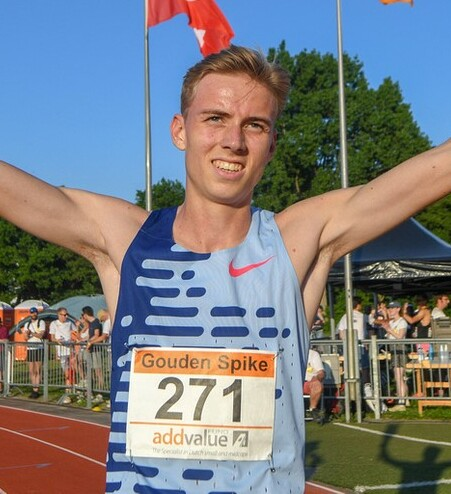
- Niels Laros during 2023 Gouden Spike

Personal information
- Born: 17 April 2005 (age 21) Oosterhout, Netherlands

Sport
- Sport: Track and field, cross country
- Events: 800 m, 1500 m, Mile, 2000 m, 3000 m, 5000 m

Achievements and titles
- Personal bests: Long track: 800 m: 1:43.60 (2026); 1000 m: 2:14.37 (2024, WU20R NR); 1500 m: 3:29.20 (2025, NR); Mile: 3:45.94 (2025, NR); 2000 m: 4:49.68 (2023, AU20B NR); 3000 m: 7:48.25 (2022, NR); 5000 m: 13:10.86 (2025); Short track: 800 m: 1:47.16 (2024, NU20R); 3000 m: 7:29.49 (2025, NR); Road: 5 km: 13:26 (2024, AU20B NR)
Medal record
Men's athletics
Representing Netherlands
Diamond League
First place	2025 Zürich	1500 m
European Games
Bronze medal – third place	2023 Kraków-Małopolska	1500 m
European Cross Country Championships
Gold medal – first place	2024 Antalya	U20 race
Silver medal – second place	2023 Brussels	U20 race
Silver medal – second place	2024 Antalya	U20 Team
European U23 Championships
Gold medal – first place	2025 Bergen	800m
Gold medal – first place	2025 Bergen	5000m
European U20 Championships
Gold medal – first place	2023 Jerusalem	1500 m
Gold medal – first place	2023 Jerusalem	5000 m
European U18 Championships
Gold medal – first place	2022 Jerusalem	1500 m
Gold medal – first place	2022 Jerusalem	3000 m

Niels Laros (pronounced [nils laːˈrɔs]; born 17 April 2005) is a Dutch middle- and long-distance runner. He is the world under-20 record holder in the 1000 metres with a time of 2:14.39 set on 7 July 2024, the European under-20 record holder in the 1500 metres with a time of 3:29.54 set on 6 August 2024, and holds the Dutch record and European under-20 record in the mile, with times of 3:45.94 and 3:48.93 respectively.

He is the 2022 European Under-18 Champion in the 1500 metres and 3000 metres and the 2023 European Under-20 Champion in the 1500 metres and 5000 metres. He was European Athletics Rising Star of the Year in 2024.

== Early and personal life ==
Niels Laros was born on 17 April 2005. From Oosterhout, Laros' parents, Marcel Laros and Sandra Laros-Hofmans, were both runners. His brother Lars is a college athlete. He attended school at Oelbert Gymnasium in Oosterhout. He began to be coached by Tomasz Lewandowski in February 2022. He divided his final high school in two parts to allow him to participate in training camps with Lewandowski.

== Career ==
=== 2022 ===
In 2022, Laros set new U18 European 1500m and 3000m records which had previously been held by Jakob Ingebrigtsen.

=== 2023 ===
In May 2023, he lowered the Dutch national junior record in the 5000 meters to 13.23.01. In June 2023 running in Nice, aged eighteen, he equalled the 22 year-old Dutch 1500m national record of 3:32.89 held by Gert-Jan Liefers. He was selected to represent the Netherlands in the men's 1500m at the 2023 European Athletics Team Championships. He finished third in the event, behind winner Mohamed Katir. Selected for the 1500m at the 2023 World Athletics Championships, he qualified for the final, in which he ran a new national record time of 3:31.25. In September 2023, he set a new national record of 3:48.93 in the mile, at the Diamond League final in Eugene, Oregon.

=== 2024 ===
In February 2024, he set a new Dutch record and European U20 record for the 5km, running 13:26 on the road in Monaco. In July 2024, he set a world under-20 record over 1000 metres of 2:14.37 in Hengelo. He competed at the 2024 Summer Olympics over 1500 metres and ran a personal best and European U20 record to place sixth in the final.

He won the U20 race at the 2024 European Cross Country Championships in Antalya, Turkey in December 2024.

=== 2025 ===
He set a Dutch record of 7:29.49 for the 3000 metres indoor in Liévin on 13 February 2025. He won the 5000 metres competing for the Netherlands at the 2025 European Athletics Team Championships First Division in Madrid on 29 June 2025. On 5 July, he won the Bowerman Mile over Yared Nuguse in a Dutch record time of 3:45.94.

He won the 5000 metres at the 2025 European Athletics U23 Championships in Bergen, Norway in 13:44.74. In qualifying for the final of the 800 metres at the championships he also set a new personal best of 1:44.19.

On 22 August, at the Brussels Diamond League, Laros won the 1500 metres over Phanuel Koech and Yared Nuguse, in a time of 3:30.58. He set a new Dutch record of 3:29.20 to win the 1500m at the Diamond League Final in Zurich on 28 August.

He was selected for the Dutch team for the 2025 World Athletics Championships in Tokyo, Japan, to compete over 1500 metres and 5000 metres. He was a finalist over 1500 metres, placing fifth. He also competed in the 5000 metres but withdrew from the race with an injury.

=== 2026 ===
On 21 June 2026, in his first race since suffering injury at the 2025 World Championships, Laros ran a personal best 1:43.83 to win the 800 metres at the FBK Games in Hengelo. On 28 June, he ran a new personal best for the 800 metres with 1:43.60 at the 2026 Meeting de Paris. He was scheduled to defend his title at the Bowerman Mile in July, but scratched, and later announced that his season was over due to an Achilles tendon injury.

== Personal bests ==
Information from his World Athletics profile unless otherwise noted.

Personal best times
Event	Time	Location	Date	Record
800 metres	1:43.60	Paris, France	28 June 2026	
800 metres short track	1:47.16 i	Toruń, Poland	6 February 2024	NU20R
1000 metres	2:14.39	Hengelo, Netherlands	7 July 2024	NR WU20R
1500 metres	3:29.20	Zurich, Switzerland	28 August 2025	NR
Mile	3:45.94	Eugene, United States	5 July 2025	NR
2000 metres	4:49.68	Brussels, Belgium	8 September 2023	NR AU20B
3000 metres	7:29.49 i	Liévin, France	13 February 2025	NR
3000 metres short track	7:29.49 i	Liévin, France	13 February 2025	NR
5000 metres	13:10.86	Nice, France	31 May 2025	
5 kilometres road	13:26	Monaco City, Monaco	11 February 2024	NR AU20B

== International competitions ==
Information from his World Athletics profile unless otherwise noted.

Representing the Netherlands
Year	Competition	Venue	Position	Event	Result	Notes
2022	European U18 Championships	Jerusalem, Israel	1st	1500m	3:49.99	CR
2022	European U18 Championships	Jerusalem, Israel	1st	3000m	8:11.49	
2023	European Team Championships First Division	Chorzów, Poland	3rd	1500m	3:37.59	
2023	European U20 Championships	Jerusalem, Israel	1st	1500m	3:56.78	
2023	European U20 Championships	Jerusalem, Israel	1st	5000m	14:11.82	
2023	World Championships	Budapest, Hungary	10th	1500m	3:31.25	NR
2023	European Cross Country Championships	Brussels, Belgium	2nd	U20 race	16:10	
2024	European Championships	Rome, Italy	23rd (h)	800m	1:46.62	
2024	Olympic Games	Paris, France	6th	1500m	3:29.54	NR
2024	European Cross Country Championships	Antalya, Turkey	1st	U20 race	14:07	
2025	European Indoor Championships	Apeldoorn, Netherlands	11th	3000m	7:57.18	
2025	European Team Championships First Division	Madrid, Spain	1st	5000m	13:44.45	
2025	European U23 Championships	Bergen, Norway	1st	800m	1:44.36	
2025	European U23 Championships	Bergen, Norway	1st	5000m	13:44.74	
2025	World Championships	Tokyo, Japan	5th	1500m	3:34.52	
2025	World Championships	Tokyo, Japan	25th (h)	5000 m	DNF	

Records
Preceded by Jakob Ingebrigtsen	Men's mile European U20 record holder 16 September 2023 – present	Incumbent
Preceded by Benjamin Kipkurui	Men's 1000 m world U20 record holder 7 July 2024 – present	Incumbent
Preceded by Jakob Ingebrigtsen	Men's 1500 m European U20 record holder 6 August 2024 – present	Incumbent
Awards
Preceded by Mattia Furlani	Men's European Athletics Rising Star of the Year; 2024	Most recent
