= Peter Bol (runner) =

Australian middle-distance runner (born 1994)

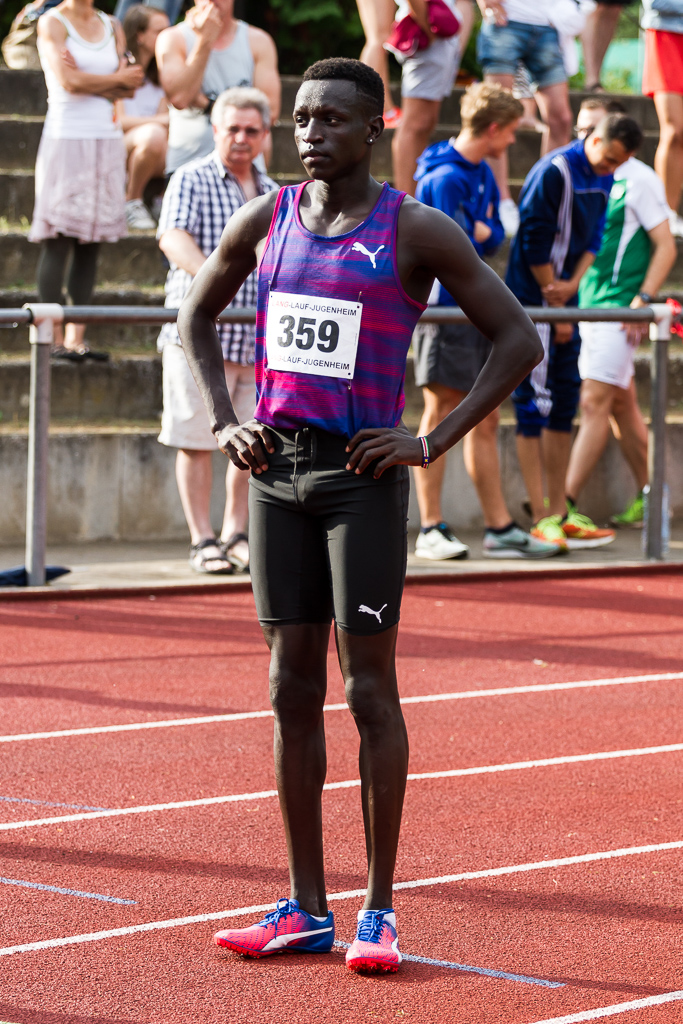
- Bol in 2017

Personal information
- Nationality: Australian
- Born: Nagmeldin Bol; 22 February 1994 (age 32) Khartoum, Sudan
- Height: 5 ft 10 in (178 cm)

Sport
- Country: Australia
- Sport: Track and field
- Event: 800 metres
- University team: Curtin University
- Club: St Kevins Athletics Club
- Coached by: Justin Rinaldi

Achievements and titles
- Personal best: 1:42.55 (Monaco 2025)
Medal record
Men's athletics
Representing Australia
Commonwealth Games
Silver medal – second place	2022 Birmingham	800 m

Nagmeldin "Peter" Bol (born 22 February 1994) is an Australian middle-distance runner who competes in the 800 metres. He represented Australia at the 2016 Rio Olympics, placed fourth at the 2020 Tokyo Olympics and won the silver medal at the 2022 Birmingham Commonwealth Games. Bol also competed at the 2024 Paris Olympics.

== Early life and education ==
Born in Khartoum, Sudan, Bol's mother Hanan Kuku is Sudanese of Nubian ethnicity, and his father Abdalla Bol is an ethnic Dinka from the region that is now South Sudan. His family fled the Second Sudanese Civil War when he was four. In 2016, it was falsely reported that his family lived in an Egyptian refugee camp before emigrating to Australia. Bol has stated that "despite what some people have said and written, we never lived in a refugee camp."

At the age of eight, Bol arrived in Toowoomba, Queensland. He grew up in Perth and attended St Norbert College on a basketball scholarship. In 2017, Bol completed a degree in construction management at Curtin University. He briefly worked as an engineer prior to signing an Adidas contract in 2018, and has since also completed a business course at the University of Melbourne.

== Athletics career ==
Bol was a promising basketballer in Perth, Western Australia. When he was 16, a teacher at St Norbert College suggested he try 800 metres running after a promising cross-country race.

Bol competed at the 2016 Rio Olympics. At the Games, Bol finished sixth in his heat with a time of 1:49.36.

At the 2017 World Championships in Athletics in London, he finished seventh in his heat in a time of 1:49.65.

In June 2018 at an IAAF meet in Stockholm, Sweden, he set a personal best of 1:44.56 in the 800 m defeating training partner Joseph Deng.

He was eliminated in the heats of his signature event at the 2019 World Championships held in Doha, Qatar, running 1:46.92.

At the Tokyo Olympics in 2021, Bol came first in his semi-final with a personal best time of 1:44:11. He then came fourth in the final, missing out on a bronze medal by 0.53 s.

He set a new Oceania and Australian record of 1:44.00 in June 2022 at the Paris Diamond League. This was the third time he has lowered the national record in the 800 m. That year Bol finished seventh in his specialty at the World Championships held in Eugene, Oregon with a time of 1:45.51 before claiming the silver medal at the Birmingham Commonwealth Games in 1:47.66.

=== Doping suspension and exoneration ===
In January 2023, it was announced that Bol had been provisionally suspended by Athletics Australia after failed out-of-competition doping test, with the test showing signs of synthetic EPO. His suspension was lifted the following month because his B sample returned an atypical finding (ATF) for EPO, though Sport Integrity Australia continued its investigation. In August 2023, Bol was officially cleared by Sports Integrity Australia.

=== Return to racing ===
Bol returned to racing but went out of the heats at the 2023 World Athletics Championships in Budapest, Hungary. Bol competed in the 800 metres race at the 2024 Paris Olympics, exiting after the repechage round, and did not qualify for the semi-finals.

Bol won the 2025 Australian Championships in Perth in April, running 1:43.79 for the 800 metres. He was one of the racers who participated in Grand Slam Track in 2025. He set a new 1:42.55 Australian record for the 800 metres at the 2025 Herculis Diamond League event in July. Bol competed for Australia at the 2025 World Athletics Championships in Tokyo, Japan, in September 2025 in the men's 800 metres.

Bol won ahead of fellow Justin Rinaldi–coached athlete Bob Abdelrahim in the 800 metres at the Perth Track Classic on 14 February 2026, running 1:43.89 to set a new meet record. Later that month, he also won ahead of Abdelrahim in the 800 metres at the Hobart Track Classic in Tasmania. Bol was selected for 2026 World Athletics Indoor Championships in Toruń, Poland, in March 2026. Racing indoors for the first time in seven years, Bol reached his first global final for four years, progressing through the rounds over 800 metres and winning his semi-final in a time of 1:46.21 ahead of Allon Clay of Japan. Bol set a new Oceania indoor record in the final, placing fourth overall in 1:45.14. On 16 June, Bol won over 1000 metres in an Oceanian record of 2:15.13 at the Golden Spike meeting in Ostrava.

== Personal life ==
Bol became engaged to Mahtut Yaynu in March 2024. They have a daughter, born in October 2024.

== Achievements ==
=== International competitions ===
Representing Australia
Year	Competition	Venue	Position	Event	Time
2016	Olympic Games	Rio de Janeiro, Brazil	41st (h)	800 m	1:49.36
2017	World Championships	London, United Kingdom	38th (h)	800 m	1:49.65
2019	World Championships	Doha, Qatar	31st (h)	800 m	1:46.92
2021	Olympic Games	Tokyo, Japan	4th	800 m	1:45.92
2022	World Championships	Eugene, United States	7th	800 m	1:45.51
2022	Commonwealth Games	Birmingham, United Kingdom	2nd	800 m	1:47.66
2023	World Championships	Budapest, Hungary	28th (h)	800 m	1:46.75
2024	Olympic Games	Paris, France	18th (rep)	800 m	1:46.12
2025	World Championships	Tokyo, Japan	19th (h)	800 m	1:45.15
2026	World Indoor Championships	Toruń, Poland	4th	800 m	1:45.14
2026	Commonwealth Games	Glasgow, United Kingdom	7th	800 m	1:46.73

=== Circuit performances ===
Grand Slam Track results
Slam	Race group	Event	Pl.	Time	Prize money
2025 Miami Slam	Short distance	1500 m	5th	3:35.24	US$20,000
2025 Miami Slam	Short distance	800 m	3rd	1:44.13	US$20,000

==== Wins and titles ====
- Diamond League
  - 2018: Stockholm BAUHAUS-galan (800 m)

=== National titles ===
- Australian Athletics Championships
  - 800 metres: 2019, 2021, 2022

=== Personal bests ===
- 600 metres – 1:16.26 (Glendale 2019)
- 800 metres – 1:42.55 (Monaco 2025)
  - 800 metres indoor – 1:45.14 (Toruń 2026)
- 1500 metres – 3:34.52 (Décines 2023)
