= 2022 World Athletics U20 Championships – Men's 1500 metres =

Men's 1500 metres at the 2022 World Athletics U20 Championships
- Venue: Estadio Olímpico Pascual Guerrero
- Dates: 1 August (round 1); 3 August (final)
- Winning time: 3:35.83

Medalists
gold medal	Reynold Cheruiyot	Kenya
silver medal	Ermias Girma	Ethiopia
bronze medal	Daniel Kimaiyo	Kenya

The men's 1500 metres at the 2022 World Athletics U20 Championships was held at the Estadio Olímpico Pascual Guerrero in Cali, Colombia on 1 and 3 August 2022.

Of the 44 athletes from 31 countries who originally entered the competition, only 41 competed.

== Records ==
U20 standing records prior to the 2022 World Athletics U20 Championships were as follows:

Record	Athlete & Nationality	Mark	Location	Date
World U20 Record	Ronald Kwemoi (KEN)	3:28.81	Monaco	18 July 2014
Championship Record	Abdelaati Iguider (MAR)	3:35.53	Grosseto, Italy	15 July 2004
World U20 Leading	Reynold Cheruiyot (KEN)	3:34.02	Heusden-Zolder, Belgium	2 July 2022

== Results ==
=== Round 1 ===
The round 1 took place on 1 August, with the 41 athletes involved being split into 2 heats of 14 and 1 of 13 athletes each. The first 3 athletes in each heat ( Q ) and the next 3 fastest ( q ) qualified to the final. The overall results were as follows:

Rank	Heat	Name	Nationality	Time	Note
1	2	Reynold Cheruiyot	Kenya	3:40.96	Q
2	1	Daniel Kimaiyo	Kenya	3:42.69	Q
3	1	Adihana Kasaye	Ethiopia	3:43.06	Q
4	1	Filip Rak	Poland	3:44.84	Q
5	2	Vivien Henz	Luxembourg	3:45.04	Q
6	3	Ermias Girma	Ethiopia	3:45.40	Q
7	2	Max Davies	Canada	3:45.55	Q
8	1	Jonathan Grahn	Sweden	3:45.58	q
9	3	Nathan Green	United States	3:45.80	Q
10	3	Ethan Hussey	Great Britain	3:46.18	Q
11	3	Zane Powell	New Zealand	3:46.56	q
12	3	Kevin Kamenschak	Austria	3:46.60	q
13	3	Fikadu Fikadu Dawit Girma	Bahrain	3:47.04	
14	2	Ferenc Soma Kovács	Hungary	3:47.20	
15	2	Thomas Serafini	Italy	3:47.55	
16	2	Christoph Schrick	Germany	3:47.68	
17	1	Hosea Kiprop	Uganda	3:48.43	
18	3	Esten Hauen	Norway	3:48.74	
19	3	Regis Thibert	Belgium	3:49.42	
20	2	Bade Alsweed	Kuwait	3:49.52	
21	2	Johannes Morepe	South Africa	3:49.63	
22	3	Sanele Zinxunge	South Africa	3:49.88	
23	3	Stefan Nillessen	Netherlands	3:50.36	
24	1	Hassan Idleh Diraneh	Djibouti	3:50.72	
25	3	Said Ameri	Algeria	3:50.78	
26	1	Arjun Waskale	India	3:51.10	
27	2	David Ninavia Mamani	Bolivia	3:52.18	
28	2	Jumpei Maseda	Japan	3:52.25	
29	1	William Knol	Netherlands	3:53.50	
30	2	Brayan Antonio Jara	Chile	3:54.36	
31	3	Peyton Craig	Australia	3:55.14	
32	1	Matthew Erickson	Canada	3:55.16	
33	1	Bálint Szinte	Hungary	3:56.06	
34	1	Muluken Tewalt	United States	3:56.54	
35	3	Pavel Vinduška	Czech Republic	3:57.22	
36	1	Patrick Cantlon	Australia	3:57.50	
37	1	Benjamin Olsen	Norway	3:57.64	
38	2	Gabriel Timba	France	4:03.35	
39	2	Karsen Vesty	New Zealand	4:17.86	
	1	Ondřej Gajdoš	Czech Republic	DNF	
	2	Abdo-Razak Hassan	Djibouti	DNF	

=== Final ===
The final was started at 19:55 on 3 August.

Rank	Name	Nationality	Time	Note
1st place, gold medalist(s)	Reynold Cheruiyot	Kenya	3:35.83	
2nd place, silver medalist(s)	Ermias Girma	Ethiopia	3:37.24	
3rd place, bronze medalist(s)	Daniel Kimaiyo	Kenya	3:37.43	
4	Adihana Kasaye	Ethiopia	3:38.10	
5	Nathan Green	United States	3:39.44	
6	Ethan Hussey	Great Britain	3:39.60 [.593]	PB
7	Vivien Henz	Luxembourg	3:39.60 [.600]	
8	Kevin Kamenschak	Austria	3:40.95	PB
9	Jonathan Grahn	Sweden	3:43.96	
10	Filip Rak	Poland	3:44.12	PB
11	Max Davies	Canada	3:50.76	
12	Zane Powell	New Zealand	3:59.19	
