= 2023 European Athletics U23 Championships – Men's 800 metres =

Men's 800 metres at the 2023 European Athletics U23 Championships
- Venue: Leppävaara Stadium
- Location: Espoo, Finland
- Dates: 14 July (heats); 16 July (final)
- Competitors: 19 from 11 nations
- Winning time: 1:45.92

Medalists
| gold medal | Yanis Meziane | France |
| silver medal | Ethan Hussey | Great Britain |
| bronze medal | Paul Anselmini | France |

The Men's 800 metres event at the 2023 European Athletics U23 Championships was held in Espoo, Finland, at Leppävaara Stadium on 14 and 16 July.

== Records ==
Prior to the competition, the records were as follows:

| European U23 record | Yuriy Borzakovskiy (RUS) | 1:42.47 | Brussels, Belgium | 24 August 2001 |
| Championship U23 record | Nils Schumann (GER) | 1:45.21 | Gothenburg, Sweden | 1 August 1999 |

== Results ==
=== Heats ===
First 3 in each heat (Q) and the next 2 fastest (q) will qualify for the final.

==== Heat 1 ====
| Place | Athlete | Nation | Time | Notes |
|---|---|---|---|---|
| 1 | Francesco Pernici | Italy | 1:45.53 | Q |
| 2 | Samuel Reardon | Great Britain | 1:45.95 | Q, PB |
| 3 | Yanis Meziane | France | 1:46.20 | Q |
| 4 | Cian McPhillips | Ireland | 1:46.35 | q |
| 5 | Dániel Huller | Hungary | 1:46.46 | q, SB |
| 6 | Reece Sharman-Newell | Great Britain | 1:46.75 | |
| 7 | Eric Guzman | Spain | 1:46.86 | |
| 8 | Jakub Augustyniak | Poland | 1:49.37 | |
| — | Tobias Grønstad | Norway | DNF | |

==== Heat 2 ====
| Place | Athlete | Nation | Time | Notes |
|---|---|---|---|---|
| 1 | Ethan Hussey | Great Britain | 1:47.16 | Q |
| 2 | Paul Anselmini | France | 1:47.18 | Q |
| 3 | Ole Jakob Solbu | Norway | 1:47.27 | Q |
| 4 | Kacper Lewalski | Poland | 1:47.47 | |
| 5 | José Ignacio Pérez | Spain | 1:47.50 | |
| 6 | Mehmet Çelik | Turkey | 1:48.06 | |
| 7 | Corentin Magnou | France | 1:48.32 | |
| 8 | David Carranza | Spain | 1:48.67 | |
| 9 | Cristian Voicu | Romania | 1:48.94 | |
| 10 | Oskars Bambals | Latvia | 1:50.32 | |

=== Final ===
| Place | Athlete | Nation | Time | Notes |
|---|---|---|---|---|
| 1st place, gold medalist(s) | Yanis Meziane | France | 1:45.92 | |
| 2nd place, silver medalist(s) | Ethan Hussey | Great Britain | 1:45.95 | |
| 3rd place, bronze medalist(s) | Paul Anselmini | France | 1:45.99 | |
| 4 | Francesco Pernici | Italy | 1:46.24 | |
| 5 | Samuel Reardon | Great Britain | 1:47.06 | |
| 6 | Dániel Huller | Hungary | 1:47.48 | |
| 7 | Cian McPhillips | Ireland | 1:48.04 | |
| 8 | Ole Jakob Solbu | Norway | 1:51.73 | |
