= James Harding (runner) =

New Zealand middle-distance runner (born 2003)

Personal information
- Born: 6 November 2003 (age 23)

Sport
- Sport: Athletics
- Event: Middle-distance running

Achievements and titles
- Personal bests: 800m: 1:44.94 (2026); 1500m: 3:39.85 (2026); Mile: 3:55.78i (2026)

James Harding (born 6 November 2003) is a New Zealand middle-distance runner. He is the New Zealand indoor national record holder over 800 metres.

== Biography ==
From Pukekohe, Harding attended secondary school at King's College, Auckland, graduating in 2021 before moving to the United States to study and compete at the University of Oregon in 2022. Specialising in 800 metres and 1500 metres while representing Counties Manukau Athletics and the Papakura Athletics and Harriers club, Harding bettered the New Zealand national junior (under 20) record held by Nick Willis, running 1:47.96.

At the 2022 World Athletics U20 Championships in Cali, Colombia, Harding was sixth in the final of the 800 metres, with a time of 1:48.35.

Harding initially redshirted at Oregon. In March 2025, he was part of the Oregon medley distance relay which placed third overall at the 2025 NCAA Division I Indoor Track and Field Championships in Virginia Beach. That year at the Razorback Invitational in Arkansas, Harding set the New Zealand national record for the 800 metres indoors at 1:47.39.

In January 2026, Harding ran a new 800 m personal best of 1:46.83 to break his own New Zealand indoor national record set the previous year ago at the same venue in Arkansas. That weekend he also set a new personal best in the mile of 3:55.78. Having had his national record equalled by Tom Cowan, on 20 February 2026, Harding lowered the national record in the 800 metres again, with a time of 1:46.44 at the Arkansas Qualifier in Fayetteville, Arkansas, placing third behind Rivaldo Marshall of Jamaica, and Oregon teammate Matthew Erickson of Canada. Competing at the 2026 NCAA Indoor Championships the following month, he qualified for the final of the 800 metres with the sixth fastest time of 1:47.23, and finished fifth in the final in 1:46.98.

In March 2026, Harding ran 1:47.12 in the heats of the 800 m at the 2026 World Athletics Indoor Championships in Toruń, Poland. In May, Harding ran a new personal best of 1:45.66 for the 800 m at the Oregon Twilight meeting.
