= 2022 World Athletics U20 Championships – Men's 800 metres =

Men's 800 metres at the 2022 World Athletics U20 Championships
- Venue: Estadio Olímpico Pascual Guerrero
- Dates: 4 August (heats); 5 August (semifinal); 6 August (final)
- Competitors: 54 from 34 nations
- Winning time: 1:47.36

Medalists
gold medal	Ermias Girma	Ethiopia
silver medal	Heithem Chenitef	Algeria
bronze medal	Ethan Hussey	Great Britain

The men's 800 metres at the 2022 World Athletics U20 Championships was held at the Estadio Olímpico Pascual Guerrero in Cali, Colombia on 4, 5 and 6 August 2022.

== Records ==
U20 standing records prior to the 2022 World Athletics U20 Championships were as follows:

Record	Athlete & Nationality	Mark	Location	Date
World U20 Record	Nijel Amos (BOT)	1:41.73	London, United Kingdom	9 August 2012
Championship Record	Emmanuel Wanyonyi (KEN)	1:43.76	Nairobi, Kenya	22 August 2021
World U20 Leading	Emmanuel Wanyonyi (KEN)	1:44.01	Nairobi, Kenya	25 June 2022

== Results ==
=== Round 1 ===
Qualification: First 3 of each heat (Q) and the 3 fastest times (q) qualified for the semifinals.

Rank	Heat	Name	Nationality	Time	Note
1	1	Ermias Girma	Ethiopia	1:48.39	Q
2	6	Mersimoi Kasahun	Ethiopia	1:48.54	Q
3	3	Kacper Lewalski	Poland	1:48.59	Q
4	6	Bader Alsweed	Kuwait	1:48.60	Q
5	3	Ole Jakob Solbu	Norway	1:48.78	Q
6	6	Jakub Dudycha	Czech Republic	1:48.83	Q
7	3	Giovanni Lazzaro	Italy	1:48.89	Q
8	6	J'voughnn Blake	Jamaica	1:48.97	q
9	3	Luke Hitchcock	New Zealand	1:49.21	q, PB
10	1	James Harding	New Zealand	1:49.30	Q
11	1	Malik Skupin-Alfa	Germany	1:49.80	Q
12	3	Arjun Waskale	India	1:49.83	PB
13	3	Shuta Azuma	Japan	1:50.22	
14	7	Ethan Hussey	Great Britain	1:50.28	Q
15	7	Samuel Rodman	United States	1:50.36	Q
16	4	Abdo-Razak Hassan	Djibouti	1:50.47	Q
17	7	Bartosz Kitliński	Poland	1:50.49 [.483]	Q
17	7	Luke Boyes	Australia	1:50.49 [.483]	Q
19	1	Siphesihle Khoza	South Africa	1:50.50	
20	6	Martin Mauluka	Zambia	1:50.57	PB
21	5	Heithem Chenitef	Algeria	1:50.71	Q
22	4	Samuel Reardon	Great Britain	1:50.87	Q
23	5	Dominic Kiptoo Barngetuny	Kenya	1:50.96	Q
24	5	Matthew Erickson	Canada	1:50.99	Q
25	1	János Kubasi	Hungary	1:51.01	
26	5	Francesco Pernici	Italy	1:51.07	
27	1	Kizuku Ushiroda	Japan	1:51.16	
28	7	Žiga Jan	Slovenia	1:51.27	
29	5	Elija Ziem	Germany	1:51.28	
30	2	Noah Kibet	Kenya	1:51.37	Q
31	2	Charlie Jeffreson	Australia	1:51.69 [.682]	Q
32	4	Paul Anselmini	France	1:51.69 [.687]	Q
33	2	Miles Brown	United States	1:51.82	Q
34	2	Ramón Wipfli	Switzerland	1:52.06	
35	1	Elias Oliveira	Brazil	1:52.34	
36	5	Uku-Renek Kronbergs	Estonia	1:52.44	
37	7	Beer Harms	Netherlands	1:52.54	
38	2	Riley Flemington	Canada	1:52.62	
39	6	Edwin Santos	Puerto Rico	1:52.63	
40	4	Jiří Pavel Češka	Czech Republic	1:52.66	
41	3	Pradeep Senthilkumar	India	1:52.78	
42	2	Janio Marcos Gonçalves	Brazil	1:52.98	
43	4	Karabo Try Madonsela	South Africa	1:53.21	
44	6	Husain Mohsin Al-Farsi	Oman	1:53.32	
45	4	Anže Požgaj Svit	Slovenia	1:53.44	
46	5	Adrian Nethersole	Jamaica	1:53.91	
47	2	Gonzalo Gervasini	Uruguay	1:54.41	
48	3	Seif Eddine Hafsi	Algeria	1:54.71	
49	7	Pedro Marín	Colombia	1:56.15	
50	4	Aleksa Tomić	Serbia	1:56.41	
51	5	Ahmed Wisaam	Maldives	2:01.26	
52	4	Tajhjani Brooks	Anguilla	2:03.37	
53	6	Louis Low-Beer	Switzerland	2:49.40	
	7	Benjamin Olsen	Norway	DNS	

=== Semifinals ===
Qualification: First 2 of each heat (Q) and the 2 fastest times (q) qualified for the final.

Rank	Heat	Name	Nationality	Time	Note
1	3	Noah Kibet	Kenya	1:46.37	Q
2	3	Samuel Reardon	Great Britain	1:46.80	Q, PB
3	3	Mersimoi Kasahun	Ethiopia	1:46.95	q, PB
4	1	Ermias Girma	Ethiopia	1:47.96	Q
5	3	James Harding	New Zealand	1:48.00	q
6	1	Ethan Hussey	Great Britain	1:48.18	Q
7	3	Matthew Erickson	Canada	1:48.42	
8	1	Charlie Jeffreson	Australia	1:48.45	
9	2	Heithem Chenitef	Algeria	1:48.55	Q, PB
10	2	Kacper Lewalski	Poland	1:48.76	Q
11	1	Bartosz Kitliński	Poland	1:48.82	
12	3	J'voughnn Blake	Jamaica	1:48.87	
13	2	Paul Anselmini	France	1:48.96	
14	2	Dominic Kiptoo Barngetuny	Kenya	1:49.04	
15	1	Bader Alsweed	Kuwait	1:49.10	
16	1	Luke Hitchcock	New Zealand	1:49.36	
17	1	Samuel Rodman	United States	1:49.47	
18	2	Abdo-Razak Hassan	Djibouti	1:49.74	
19	3	Jakub Dudycha	Czech Republic	1:50.10	
20	2	Miles Brown	United States	1:50.17	
21	3	Luke Boyes	Australia	1:50.26	
22	2	Malik Skupin-Alfa	Germany	1:50.43	
23	2	Giovanni Lazzaro	Italy	1:51.72	
24	1	Ole Jakob Solbu	Norway	1:54.93	

=== Final ===
The final was held on 6 August at 16:16.

Rank	Lane	Name	Nationality	Time	Note
1st place, gold medalist(s)	4	Ermias Girma	Ethiopia	1:47.36	
2nd place, silver medalist(s)	1	Heithem Chenitef	Algeria	1:47.61	PB
3rd place, bronze medalist(s)	8	Ethan Hussey	Great Britain	1:47.65	
4	3	Kacper Lewalski	Poland	1:47.84	
5	6	Samuel Reardon	United Kingdom	1:48.33	
6	2	James Harding	New Zealand	1:48.35	
7	6	Noah Kibet	Kenya	1:48.50	
8	7	Mersimoi Kasahun	Ethiopia	1:49.27	
