= Athletics at the 2025 Summer World University Games – Men's 800 metres =

Men's 800 metres at the 2025 Summer World University Games
- Venue: Lohrheidestadion
- Location: Bochum, Germany
- Dates: 25 July (heats); 26 July (semi-finals); 27 July (final)
- Competitors: 42 from 33 nations
- Winning time: 1:47.64

Medalists
gold medal	David Barroso	Spain
silver medal	Maciej Wyderka	Poland
bronze medal	Mehmet Çelik	Turkey

The men's 800 metres event at the 2025 Summer World University Games was held in Bochum, Germany, at Lohrheidestadion on 25, 26 and 27 July.

== Records ==
Prior to the competition, the records were as follows:

Record	Athlete (nation)	Distance (m)	Location	Date
Games record	Alberto Juantorena (CUB)	1:43.40	Sofia, Bulgaria	21 August 1977

== Results ==
=== Heats ===
First 4 in each heat (Q) and the next 4 fastest (q) qualified for the semi-finals.

==== Heat 1 ====
Place	Athlete	Nation	Time	Notes
1	Ivan Pelizza	Switzerland	1:48.98	Q
2	Jack Lunn	Australia	1:49.19	Q
3	Alec Purnell	Canada	1:49.22	Q, SB
4	Peter Akemkwene	Uganda	1:49.23	Q
5	David Race	Great Britain	1:49.44	q
6	Sebastian Torres	Mexico	1:51.22	
7	Innocent Kanyala	Zambia	1:51.69	PB
8	John Petter Stevik	Norway	2:04.86	
9	Jovan Rosić	Bosnia and Herzegovina	2:05.07	

==== Heat 2 ====
Place	Athlete	Nation	Time	Notes
1	Mehmet Çelik	Turkey	1:49.40	Q, SB
2	Rok Markelj	Slovenia	1:49.63	Q
3	Kacper Lewalski	Poland	1:49.73	Q
4	Corentin Magnou	France	1:49.97	Q
5	Daniel Kotyza	Czech Republic	1:50.21	q
6	J. Rijoy	India	1:51.73	
7	Isaac Bonnici	Malta	1:52.03	
8	Andrej Belčić	Croatia	1:55.03	

==== Heat 3 ====
Place	Athlete	Nation	Time	Notes
1	David Barroso	Spain	1:51.27	Q
2	Ko Ochiai	Japan	1:51.36	Q
3	Nikita Bogdanovs	Latvia	1:52.15	Q
4	Markus Westhagen	Norway	1:52.44	Q
5	Darius Smallwood	United States	1:52.68	
6	Andreas Holst Lange	Denmark	1:53.14	SB
7	Gabriel Porfirio	Brazil	1:54.43	
8	Anu Kumar	India	1:56.33	

==== Heat 4 ====
Place	Athlete	Nation	Time	Notes
1	Maciej Wyderka	Poland	1:48.02	Q
2	Jan Vukovič	Slovenia	1:48.88	Q
3	Christopher Swart	South Africa	1:49.32	Q
4	Mohammed al-Suleimani	Oman	1:49.34	Q, SB
5	Wan Muhammad Fazri	Malaysia	1:49.53	q
6	Dawson Mann	Canada	1:50.66	
7	Kārlis Ancāns	Latvia	1:51.62	PB
8	Samuel Alvarez	Colombia	1:52.64	SB
9	Hamad Alyahyaee	United Arab Emirates	1:57.47	SB

==== Heat 5 ====
Place	Athlete	Nation	Time	Notes
1	Jordan Terrasse	France	1:48.87	Q
2	Sota Okamura	Japan	1:49.21	Q
3	Tommaso Maniscalco	Italy	1:49.25	Q
4	Benjamin Gardiner	Great Britain	1:49.32	Q
5	Mathis Espagnet	Luxembourg	1:49.40	q
6	Marcos Daniel Jimenez	Ecuador	1:53.36	
7	Julius Lotabonyi	Kenya	1:53.99	
8	Louie Agawa	Philippines	DQ	TR 17.2.3

=== Semi-finals ===
First 2 in each heat (Q) and the next 2 fastest (q) qualified for the final.

==== Heat 1 ====
Place	Athlete	Nation	Time	Notes
1	Maciej Wyderka	Poland	1:46.52	Q
2	Jack Lunn	Australia	1:47.32	Q
3	Jan Vukovič	Slovenia	1:47.43	q
4	Mathis Espagnet	Luxembourg	1:48.70	
5	Daniel Kotyza	Czech Republic	1:49.05	
6	Wan Muhammad Fazri	Malaysia	1:49.87	
7	Nikita Bogdanovs	Latvia	1:50.39	SB
8	Ko Ochiai	Japan	1:51.70	

==== Heat 2 ====
Place	Athlete	Nation	Time	Notes
1	David Barroso	Spain	1:47.98	Q
2	Jordan Terrasse	France	1:48.06	Q
3	Sota Okamura	Japan	1:48.67	
4	Tommaso Maniscalco	Italy	1:48.74	
5	Alec Purnell	Canada	1:49.63	
6	Christopher Swart	South Africa	1:49.73	
7	Mohammed al-Suleimani	Oman	1:50.29	
8	David Race	Great Britain	1:52.44	

==== Heat 3 ====
Place	Athlete	Nation	Time	Notes
1	Ivan Pelizza	Switzerland	1:47.17	Q
2	Mehmet Çelik	Turkey	1:47.33	Q, SB
3	Corentin Magnou	France	1:47.75	q
4	Peter Akemkwene	Uganda	1:48.02	
5	Kacper Lewalski	Poland	1:49.72	
6	Rok Markelj	Slovenia	1:51.21	
7	Markus Westhagen	Norway	1:51.80	
8	Benjamin Gardiner	Great Britain	1:59.20	

=== Final ===
Place	Athlete	Nation	Time	Notes
1st place, gold medalist(s)	David Barroso	Spain	1:47.64	
2nd place, silver medalist(s)	Maciej Wyderka	Poland	1:48.01	
3rd place, bronze medalist(s)	Mehmet Çelik	Turkey	1:48.07	
4	Corentin Magnou	France	1:48.23	
5	Ivan Pelizza	Switzerland	1:48.72	
6	Jordan Terrasse	France	1:48.73	
7	Jan Vukovič	Slovenia	1:48.94	
8	Jack Lunn	Australia	1:49.24	
