= Rivaldo Marshall =

Jamaican athlete (born 2001)

Personal information
- Nationality: Jamaica
- Born: 17 October 2001 (age 25)
- Home town: Kingston, Jamaica

Sport
- Sport: Track and Field
- Event: Middle-distance running
- University team: Arkansas Razorbacks; Iowa Hawkeyes

Achievements and titles
- Personal bests: 800 m: 1:44.15 (Fayetteville, 2026); Indoor; 800 m: 1:45.62 (Fayetteville, 2026) Previous NR

Rivaldo Marshall (born 17 October 2001) is a Jamaican middle-distance runner. He was the NCAA Indoor Champion over 800 metres in 2024. In 2026, he set a new Jamaican indoor national record at the distance.

== Biography ==
Marshall was educated at Calabar High School in Jamaica before studying in the United States at the University of Iowa.

== Career ==
Marshall became the NCAA Indoor Champion over 800 metres in March 2024 in Boston, winning ahead of Sean Dolan. Competing outdoors, he won the Big Ten Conference that year over 800 metres, and placed seventh at the 2024 NCAA Outdoor Championships.

== 2025 ==
He transferred to the University of Arkansas prior to the start of the 2025 indoor season. He placed third over 800 metres at the 2025 NCAA Outdoor Championships in Eugene, Oregon, finishing behind American Sam Whitmarsh and Canadian Matthew Erickson.

== 2026 ==
In February 2026, Marshall lowered his indoor personal best for the 800 metres to 1:46.30, before the following week setting a new Jamaican indoor national record for the 800 metres with a run of 1:45.62 in Arkansas. It was the third time the Jamaican record had been broken in a week, after previous efforts by Tyrice Taylor and Navasky Anderson. The time also set a new University of Arkansas record, surpassing the time set by Dirk Heinze in 2001. Competing at the 2026 NCAA Division I Indoor Track and Field Championships, he placed second in the final of the 800 metres behind compatriot Tyrice Taylor.

Marshall was initially selected to represent Jamaica at the 2026 World Athletics Indoor Championships in Toruń, Poland, but later withdrew. In May, Marshall ran 1:45.21 to win the 800 m at the SEC Championships and 1:45.10 at the NCAA West Regionals. In June, he qualified from the preliminary round of the 2026 NCAA Championships in 1:45.05 before placing third in the final, his points helping Arkansas to win the team title.
