= Samuel Pihlström =

Swedish athlete (born 2001)

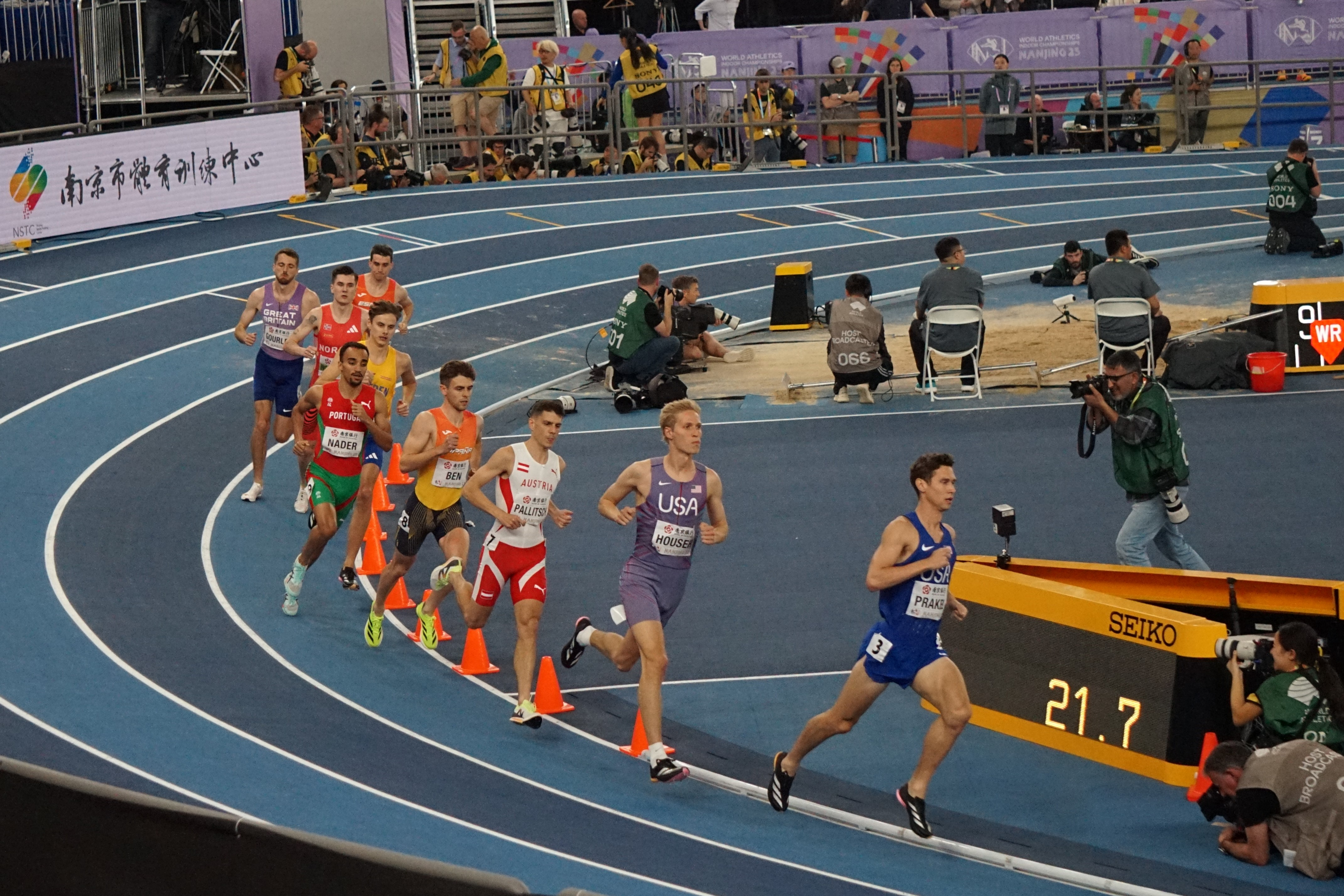
- Pihlström in the 2025 World Indoor Championships final

Personal information
- Nationality: Swedish
- Born: 8 March 2001 (age 25)

Sport
- Sport: Athletics
- Event: Middle distance running

Achievements and titles
- Personal bests: 1500m: 3:30.87 (Rome, 2025)NR; Mile: 3:49.70 (Oslo, 2025); NR
Medal record
Men's Athletics
Representing Sweden
European Championships
Silver medal – second place	2026 Birmingham	1500 metres
European U23 Championships
Bronze medal – third place	2023 Espoo	1500 metres

Samuel Pihlström (born 8 March 2001) is a Swedish middle-distance runner. The Swedish national record holder over 1500 metres and mile, he won the silver medal in the 1500 metres at the 2026 European Championships. He has competed at multiple major championships, including the 2024 Olympic Games.

== Biography ==
In June 2022 competing in Madrid, Spain at a World Athletics Continental Tour event, he won the men's 1500m in a personal best time of 3:38.46. That month, he finished fifth at the Stockholm Diamond League 1500m event. In August 2022, he competed at the 2022 European Athletics Championships in Munich in the 1500 metres. He was a bronze medalist in the 1500 metres at the 2023 European Athletics U23 Championships in Espoo.

In January 2024, he set a new national indoor record for the 1500 metres of 3:35.47 in Ostrava. He was selected to compete at the 2024 World Athletics Indoor Championships in Glasgow where he qualified for the final before finishing in eighth place overall. He finished fifth in the 1500 metres at the 2024 BAUHAUS-galan in Stockholm on 2 June 2024. He competed at the 2024 Summer Olympics over 1500 metres, running a personal best of 3:33.58 in the repechage round but missing out on a place in the semi-final by two hundredths of a second behind George Mills of Great Britain.

He ran a Swedish indoor record of 3:54.78 for the mile at the Czech Indoor Gala in Ostrava on 4 February 2025. Competing in Karlsruhe on 7 February 2025 he won over 1500m in a time of 3:35.62. was awarded a wild card place for the 2025 World Athletics Indoor Championships in Nanjing, China, for his performances on the 2025 World Athletics Indoor Tour. Competing at the Championships, he qualified for the final of the 1500 metres, finishing in fifth place overall.

On 6 June 2025, he ran 3:30.87 to set a new national record in the 1500 metres at the 2025 Golden Gala in Rome. He ran a national record 3:49.70 in the Dream Mile at the 2025 Bislett Games in Oslo on 12 June 2025. He won the 1500 metres at the 2025 BAUHAUS-galan event in Stockholm, part of the 2025 Diamond League. He placed eighth over 1500 metres at the Diamond League Final in Zurich on 28 August.

In September 2025, he was a finalist over 1500 metres at the 2025 World Championships in Tokyo, Japan, placing eleventh overall.

He ran an indoors personal best of 3:33.47 for the 1500 metres at the Copernicus Cup in Toruń on 22 February 2026. He won titles over both 1500 metres and 800 metres at the 2026 Swedish Indoor Championships in Stockholm. Competing at the 2026 World Athletics Indoor Championships in Toruń, he advanced to the final of the 1500 m after winning his heat, before placing fourth in the final in 3:40.59. On 15 August, he won the silver medal over 1500 metres at the 2026 European Championship in Birmingham, finishing in 3:36.16 behind Stefan Nillessen of the Netherlands having burst out of the pack late in the race. Speaking afterwards he said "I'm really overwhelmed. Second shouldn't be possible from where I started with one lap left to go…In the last lap I felt like it was a long way up to the medals, but I was feeling strong so I just pushed on the back straight". On 23 August, he placed fifth in 3:31.41 for the 1500 m in the Diamond League at the 2026 Kamila Skolimowska Memorial in Silesia, Poland.

== Personal life ==
Pihlström is in a relationship with Finnish steeplechase and middle-distance runner Lotta-Maria Maine.
