= 2026 World Athletics Ultimate Championship – Men's 800 metres =

Men's 800 metres at the 2026 World Athletics Ultimate Championship
- Venue: National Athletics Centre
- Location: Budapest, Hungary
- Dates: 12 September 2026 (semi-finals); 13 September 2026 (final)
- Competitors: 16 from 13 nations
- Winning time: 1:41.91 min

Champion
- Djamel Sedjati; Algeria

The men's 800 metres is scheduled to be held over two rounds at the 2026 World Athletics Ultimate Championship at the National Athletics Centre in Budapest, Hungary on 12 and 13 September 2026. It will be the first time the World Ultimate Championship is held. Athletes qualified by wildcard or by their world ranking.

== Background ==
Global records before the 2026 World Athletics Ultimate Championship
Record	Time	Athlete (nation)	Location	Date
World record	1:40.91	David Rudisha (KEN)	London, United Kingdom	9 August 2012
World lead	1:41.76	Emmanuel Wanyonyi (KEN)	Zurich, Switzerland	27 August 2026

Area records before the 2026 World Athletics Ultimate Championship
Record	Time	Athlete (nation)	Location	Date
African record	1:40.91	David Rudisha (KEN)	London, United Kingdom	9 August 2012
Asian record	1:42.79	Yusuf Saad Kamel (BHR)	Fontvieille, Monaco	29 July 2008
European record	1:41.11	Wilson Kipketer (DEN)	Cologne, Germany	24 August 1997
North, Central American, and Caribbean record	1:41.20	Marco Arop (CAN)	Paris, France	10 August 2024
Oceanian record	1:42.55	Peter Bol (AUS)	Fontvieille, Monaco	11 July 2025
South American record	1:41.77	Joaquim Cruz (BRA)	Cologne, West Germany	26 August 1984

== Qualification ==
For the 800 metres, sixteen athletes qualified, up to three by wildcard for winners of the event at the 2024 Summer Olympic, the 2025 World Athletics Championships, or the 2026 Diamond League final and the others by their position at the World Athletics Rankings for the event on 3 September 2026.

== Results ==
=== Semi-finals ===
The semi-finals were held on 12 September at 18:26 (UTC+2). First 4 of each heat (Q) qualified to the final.

==== Heat 1 ====
Place	Athlete	Nation	Time	Notes
1	Brandon Miller	United States	1:43.86	Q
2	Yanis Meziane	France	1:44.07	Q
3	Eliott Crestan	Belgium	1:44.09	Q
4	Emmanuel Wanyonyi	Kenya	1:44.43	Q
5	Navasky Anderson	Jamaica	1:44.83	
6	Mohamed Attaoui	Spain	1:45.12 [.116]	
7	Handal Roban	Saint Vincent and the Grenadines	1:45.12 [.120]	
8	Marino Bloudek	Croatia	1:45.90	

==== Heat 2 ====
Place	Athlete	Nation	Time	Notes
1	Mark English	Ireland	1:43.74	Q
2	Francesco Pernici	Italy	1:43.80	Q
3	Marco Arop	Canada	1:44.21	Q
4	Djamel Sedjati	Algeria	1:44.23	Q
5	Gabriel Tual	France	1:44.42	
6	Donavan Brazier	United States	1:44.47	
7	Max Burgin	Great Britain	1:44.56	
8	Ben Pattison	Great Britain	1:47.58	

=== Final ===
The final was held on 13 September at 19:41 (UTC+2).

Place	Athlete	Nation	Time	Notes
1st place, gold medalist(s)	Djamel Sedjati	Algeria	1:41.91	
2	Marco Arop	Canada	1:42.28	
3	Emmanuel Wanyonyi	Kenya	1:42.44	
4	Brandon Miller	United States	1:42.54	
5	Francesco Pernici	Italy	1:42.67	NR
6	Mark English	Ireland	1:42.78 [.771]	PB
7	Yanis Meziane	France	1:42.78 [.780]	PB
8	Eliott Crestan	Belgium	1:43.14	SB
