= 2025 Bislett Games =

Athletics meeting in Oslo, Norway

- Dates: 11-12 June 2025
- Host city: Oslo, Norway
- Venue: Bislett Stadium
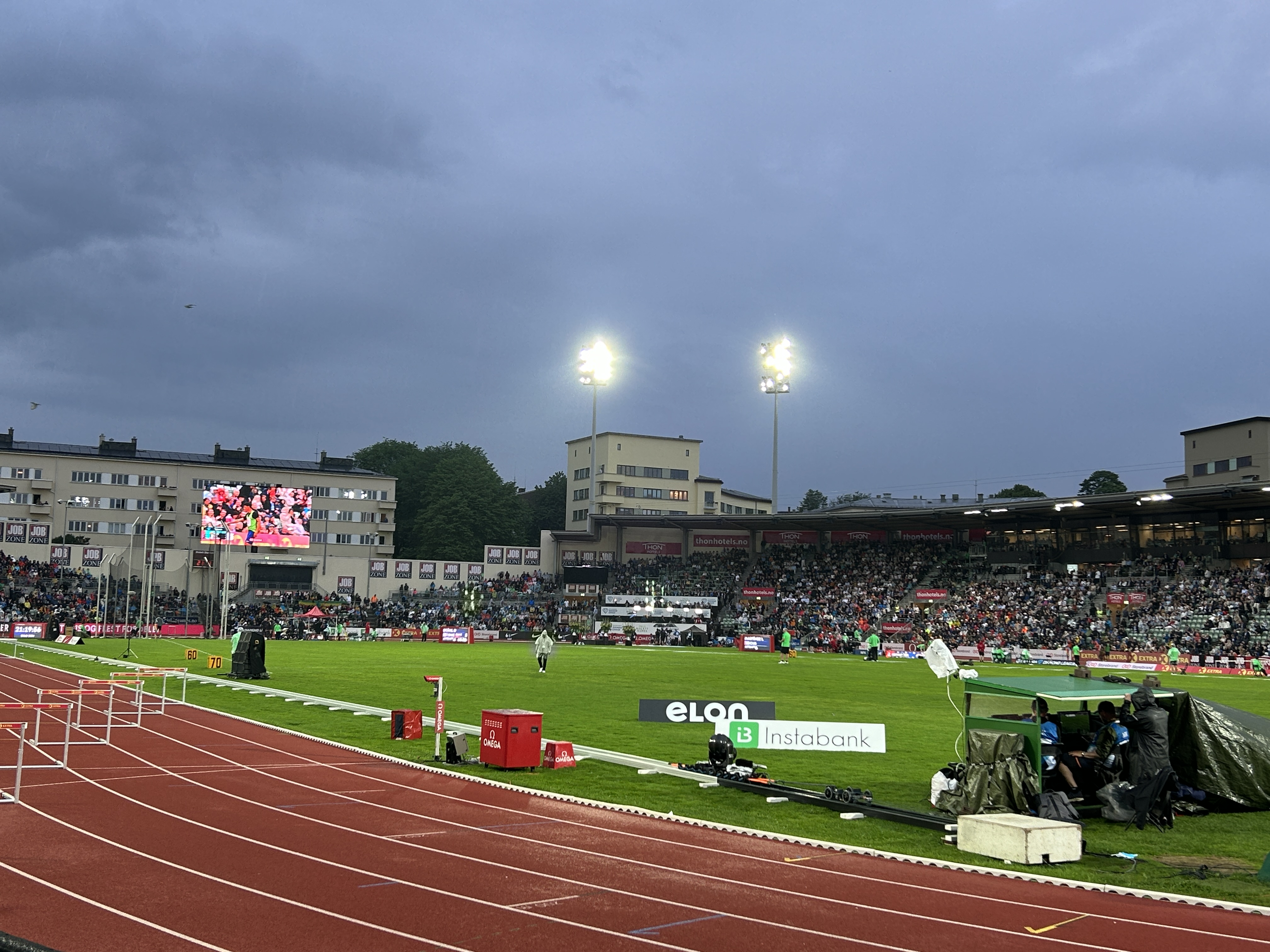
- Level: 2025 Diamond League

The 2025 Bislett Games was the 60th edition of the annual outdoor track and field meeting in Oslo, Norway. Held on 11 and 12 June at Bislett Stadium, it was the sixth leg of the 2025 Diamond League – the highest level international track and field circuit.

== Diamond+ events results ==
Starting in 2025 a new discipline of events was added called Diamond+, these 4 events per meet awarded athletes with increased prize money whilst keeping the standard points format to qualify for the Diamond league finals. First place earns 8 points, with each step down in place earning one less point than the previous, until no points are awarded in 9th place or lower. In the case of a tie, each tying athlete earns the full amount of points for the place.

=== Men's ===
5000 metres
Place	Athlete	Nation	Time	Points	Notes
1st place, gold medalist(s)	Nico Young	United States	12:45.27	8	PB
2nd place, silver medalist(s)	Biniam Mehary	Ethiopia	12:45.93	7	PB
3rd place, bronze medalist(s)	Kuma Girma	Ethiopia	12:46.41	6	PB
4	George Mills	Great Britain	12:46.59	5	NR
5	Hagos Gebrhiwet	Ethiopia	12:46.82	4	SB
6	Thierry Ndikumwenayo	Spain	12:47.67	3	PB
7	Graham Blanks	United States	12:48.20	2	PB
8	Yomif Kejelcha	Ethiopia	12:49.07	1	SB
9	Mezgebu Sime	Ethiopia	12:49.80		PB
10	Dominic Lokinyomo Lobalu	Switzerland	12:50.87		NR
11	Jacob Krop	Kenya	12:51.16		SB
12	Birhanu Balew	Bahrain	12:56.45		SB
13	Cooper Teare	United States	12:57.05		SB
14	Nicholas Kimeli	Kenya	13:06.92		
15	Gemechu Dida	Ethiopia	13:15.91		SB, PM
16	Stewart McSweyn	Australia	13:16.20		SB
—	Maximilian Thorwirth	Germany	DNF		PM

Pole vault
Place	Athlete	Nation	Height	Points	Notes
1st place, gold medalist(s)	Armand Duplantis	Sweden	6.15 m	8	MR
2nd place, silver medalist(s)	Emmanouil Karalis	Greece	5.82 m	7	
3rd place, bronze medalist(s)	Kurtis Marschall	Australia	5.72 m	6	
4	Renaud Lavillenie	France	5.72 m	5	
5	Sam Kendricks	United States	5.62 m	4	
5	Menno Vloon	Netherlands	5.62 m	3	
7	Ersu Şaşma	Turkey	5.62 m	2	
8	Sondre Guttormsen	Norway	5.40 m	1	
9	Ben Broeders	Belgium	5.40 m		
—	EJ Obiena	Philippines	NM		

=== Women's ===
100 metres
Place	Athlete	Nation	Time	Points	Notes
1st place, gold medalist(s)	Julien Alfred	Saint Lucia	10.89	8	SB
2nd place, silver medalist(s)	Marie Josée Ta Lou-Smith	Ivory Coast	11.00	7	SB
3rd place, bronze medalist(s)	Dina Asher-Smith	Great Britain	11.08	6	SB
4	Patrizia Van der Weken	Luxembourg	11.16 [.152]	5	
5	Maia McCoy	Liberia	11.16 [.158]	4	
6	Gina Lückenkemper	Germany	11.16 [.160]	3	
7	Daryll Neita	Great Britain	11.20	2	=SB
8	Zaynab Dosso	Italy	11.26	1	SB
			Wind: (+1.1 m/s)		

400 metres
Place	Athlete	Nation	Time	Points	Notes
1st place, gold medalist(s)	Isabella Whittaker	United States	49.58	8	
2nd place, silver medalist(s)	Henriette Jæger	Norway	49.62	7	NR
3rd place, bronze medalist(s)	Amber Anning	Great Britain	50.24	6	SB
4	Rhasidat Adeleke	Ireland	50.42	5	SB
5	Lieke Klaver	Netherlands	50.64	4	
6	Natalia Bukowiecka	Poland	50.67	3	
7	Paula Sevilla	Spain	50.92	2	PB
8	Sada Williams	Barbados	50.94	1	SB

== Diamond events results ==
=== Men's ===
200 metres
Place	Athlete	Nation	Time	Points	Notes
1st place, gold medalist(s)	Reynier Mena	Cuba	20.20	8	
2nd place, silver medalist(s)	Timothé Mumenthaler	Switzerland	20.27	7	PB
3rd place, bronze medalist(s)	Andre De Grasse	Canada	20.33	6	
4	Joseph Fahnbulleh	Liberia	20.44	5	
5	Filippo Tortu	Italy	20.53	4	
6	Aaron Brown	Canada	20.65	3	
7	Vernon Norwood	United States	20.67	2	
8	Kyree King	United States	20.79	1	
			Wind: (+1.5 m/s)		

800 metres
Place	Athlete	Nation	Time	Points	Notes
1st place, gold medalist(s)	Emmanuel Wanyonyi	Kenya	1:42.78	8	
2nd place, silver medalist(s)	Mohamed Attaoui	Spain	1:42.90	7	
3rd place, bronze medalist(s)	Djamel Sedjati	Algeria	1:43.06	6	
4	Gabriel Tual	France	1:43.09	5	
5	Kethobogile Haingura	Botswana	1:43.58	4	
6	Andreas Kramer	Sweden	1:43.73	3	
7	Mark English	Ireland	1:44.33	2	
—	Tobias Grønstad	Norway	DNF		
—	Patryk Sieradzki	Poland	DNF		PM

Mile
Place	Athlete	Nation	Time	Points	Notes
1st place, gold medalist(s)	Isaac Nader	Portugal	3:48.25	8	NR
2nd place, silver medalist(s)	Cameron Myers	Australia	3:48.87	7	
3rd place, bronze medalist(s)	Stefan Nillessen	Netherlands	3:49.02	6	PB
4	Timothy Cheruiyot	Kenya	3:49.06	5	PB
5	Robert Farken	Germany	3:49.12	4	NR
6	Anass Essayi	Morocco	3:49.16 [.155]	3	PB
7	Elliot Giles	Great Britain	3:49.16 [.156]	2	PB
8	Vincent Ciattei	United States	3:49.37	1	PB
9	Samuel Pihlström	Sweden	3:49.70		NR
10	Federico Riva	Italy	3:49.72		NR
11	Narve Gilje Nordås	Norway	3:49.91		SB
12	Ruben Verheyden	Belgium	3:50.67		NR
13	Oliver Hoare	Australia	3:50.92		
—	Boaz Kiprugut	Kenya	DNF		PM
—	Žan Rudolf	Slovenia	DNF		PM

300 metres hurdles
Place	Athlete	Nation	Time	Points	Notes
1st place, gold medalist(s)	Karsten Warholm	Norway	32.67	8	WBP, DLR
2nd place, silver medalist(s)	Rai Benjamin	United States	33.22	7	PB
3rd place, bronze medalist(s)	Alison dos Santos	Brazil	33.38	6	
4	Abderrahman Samba	Qatar	33.84	5	
5	Matheus Lima	Brazil	34.34	4	
6	Emil Agyekum	Germany	34.58	3	PB
7	Trevor Bassitt	United States	34.65	2	PB
8	Berke Akçam	Turkey	34.95	1	

Triple jump
Place	Athlete	Nation	Distance	Points	Notes
1st place, gold medalist(s)	Jordan Scott	Jamaica	17.34 m (+1.1 m/s)	8	PB
2nd place, silver medalist(s)	Pedro Pichardo	Portugal	17.06 m (+0.5 m/s)	7	SB
3rd place, bronze medalist(s)	Max Heß	Germany	16.96 m (+2.4 m/s)	6	
4	Lazaro Martinez	Qatar	16.91 m (+1.2 m/s)	5	
5	Yasser Triki	Algeria	16.73 m (+0.8 m/s)	4	
6	Ethan Olivier	New Zealand	16.70 m (+0.2 m/s)	3	
7	Hugues Fabrice Zango	Burkina Faso	16.56 m (+2.3 m/s)	2	
8	Russell Robinson	United States	16.50 m (+1.0 m/s)	1	
9	Henrik Flåtnes	Norway	16.03 m (+1.6 m/s)		

=== Women's ===
400 metres hurdles
Place	Athlete	Nation	Time	Points	Notes
(gold) j	Dalilah Muhammad	United States	53.34	8	SB
2nd place, silver medalist(s)	Emma Zapletalová	Slovakia	54.44	7	SB
3rd place, bronze medalist(s)	Gianna Woodruff	Panama	54.45	6	SB
4	Ayomide Folorunso	Italy	55.03	5	
5	Sarah Carli	Australia	55.13	4	
6	Amalie Iuel	Norway	55.65	3	
7	Andrea Rooth	Norway	57.02	2	
8	Anna Hall	United States	1:08.99	1	

3000 metres steeplechase
Place	Athlete	Nation	Time	Points	Notes
1st place, gold medalist(s)	Faith Cherotich	Kenya	9:02.60	8	MR, WL
2nd place, silver medalist(s)	Winfred Yavi	Bahrain	9:02.76	7	SB
3rd place, bronze medalist(s)	Marwa Bouzayani	Tunisia	9:06.84	6	SB
4	Lea Meyer	Germany	9:09.21	5	PB
5	Lomi Muleta	Ethiopia	9:13.44	4	SB
6	Courtney Wayment	United States	9:13.65	3	SB
7	Elise Thorner	Great Britain	9:15.06	2	PB
8	Gabrielle Jennings	United States	9:20.85	1	SB
9	Valerie Constien	United States	9:32.87		SB
10	Jackline Chepkoech	Kenya	9:36.87		
11	Olivia Markezich	United States	9:36.92		SB
—	Gesa Felicitas Krause	Germany	DNF		
—	Flavie Renouard	France	DNF		
—	Kinga Królik	Poland	DNF		PM

Triple jump
Place	Athlete	Nation	Distance	Points	Notes
1st place, gold medalist(s)	Leyanis Pérez	Cuba	14.72 m (+1.3 m/s)	8	
2nd place, silver medalist(s)	Shanieka Ricketts	Jamaica	14.57 m (±0.0 m/s)	7	
3rd place, bronze medalist(s)	Jasmine Moore	United States	14.41 m (−0.1 m/s)	6	SB
4	Liadagmis Povea	Cuba	14.31 m (−0.1 m/s)	5	
5	Thea LaFond	Dominica	14.26 m (+0.6 m/s)	4	
6	Ackelia Smith	Jamaica	14.26 m (+1.3 m/s)	3	SB
7	Maja Åskag	Sweden	13.77 m (+0.1 m/s)	2	
8	Ana Peleteiro	Spain	13.71 m (−0.1 m/s)	1	

Javelin throw
Place	Athlete	Nation	Distance	Points	Notes
1st place, gold medalist(s)	Haruka Kitaguchi	Japan	64.63 m	8	SB
2nd place, silver medalist(s)	Adriana Vilagoš	Serbia	63.78 m	7	
3rd place, bronze medalist(s)	Jo-Ané du Plessis	South Africa	62.77 m	6	SB
4	Elina Tzengko	Greece	62.61 m	5	
5	Mackenzie Little	Australia	59.86 m	4	SB
6	Sigrid Borge	Norway	59.09 m	3	
7	Sara Kolak	Croatia	55.49 m	2	
8	Flor Ruiz	Colombia	54.57 m	1	

== Promotional events results ==
=== Men's ===
Hammer throw
Place	Athlete	Nation	Distance	Notes
1st place, gold medalist(s)	Ethan Katzberg	Canada	80.19 m	
2nd place, silver medalist(s)	Mykhaylo Kokhan	Ukraine	79.95 m	
3rd place, bronze medalist(s)	Thomas Mardal	Norway	78.25 m	PB
4	Paweł Fajdek	Poland	78.12 m	SB
5	Bence Halász	Hungary	77.62 m	
6	Eivind Henriksen	Norway	75.01 m	SB
7	Wojciech Nowicki	Poland	72.65 m	SB

=== Women's ===
10,000 metres
Place	Athlete	Nation	Time	Notes
1st place, gold medalist(s)	Yenawa Nbret	Ethiopia	30:28.82	WL, SB
2nd place, silver medalist(s)	Miriam Chebet	Kenya	30:32.90	SB
3rd place, bronze medalist(s)	Chaltu Dida	Ethiopia	30:33.86	SB
4	Rose Davies	Australia	30:34.11	AR, PB
5	Karoline Bjerkeli Grøvdal	Norway	30:41.66	PB
6	Calli Thackery	Great Britain	30:50.64	PB
7	Isobel Batt-Doyle	Australia	30:51.27	PB
8	Diane van Es	Netherlands	31:08.05	SB
9	Wede Kefale	Ethiopia	31:24.70	SB
10	Roxane Cleppe	Belgium	32:34.71	PB
—	Dominique Scott-Efurd	South Africa	DNF	
—	Eleanor Fulton	United States	DNF	PM

== National events results ==
=== Men's ===
100 metres
Place	Athlete	Nation	Time	Notes
1st place, gold medalist(s)	Per Tinius Fremstad-Waldron	Norway	10.32	PB
2nd place, silver medalist(s)	Mathias Hove Johansen	Norway	10.36	PB
3rd place, bronze medalist(s)	Jacob Vaula	Norway	10.40	SB
4	Valentin Jensen	Denmark	10.54	SB
5	Jørgen Homstad	Norway	10.55	PB
6	Edem Agbo	Norway	10.69	SB
—	Øyvind Strømmen Kjerpeset	Norway	DQ	TR 16.8
			Wind: (+0.7 m/s)	

300 metres
Place	Athlete	Nation	Time	Notes
1st place, gold medalist(s)	Andreas Kulseng	Norway	32.19	NR, PB
2nd place, silver medalist(s)	Kenny Emi Tijani-Ajayi	Norway	33.31	
3rd place, bronze medalist(s)	Benjamin Lobo Vedel	Denmark	33.70	
4	Leon Mjaaland	Norway	34.13	
5	Jonathan Hertwig-Ødegaard	Norway	34.37	
6	Filip Bøe	Norway	34.68	

400 metres
Place	Athlete	Nation	Time	Notes
1st place, gold medalist(s)	Andreas Haara Bakketun	Norway	46.52	SB
2nd place, silver medalist(s)	Andreas Grimerud	Norway	46.86	SB
3rd place, bronze medalist(s)	Bastian Elnan Aurstad	Norway	47.68	SB
4	Fredrik Gullaschsen	Norway	48.82	
5	Thomas Strønstad-Løseth	Norway	49.29	SB
6	Noah Merheb	Norway	49.67	SB
7	Theodore Fremstad-Waldron	Norway	50.19	
8	Tobias Johansen	Norway	50.72	

800 metres
Place	Athlete	Nation	Time	Notes
1st place, gold medalist(s)	Bartosz Kitliński	Poland	1:47.25	
2nd place, silver medalist(s)	Sigurd Tveit	Norway	1:47.34	SB
3rd place, bronze medalist(s)	John Petter Stevik	Norway	1:48.19	PB
4	Nick Jensen	Denmark	1:49.19	SB, PM
5	Benjamin Åberg	Sweden	1:49.42	PB
6	Markus Westhagen	Norway	1:49.70	PB
7	Felix Francois	Sweden	1:49.92	SB
8	Jonas Magnusson	Sweden	1:50.44	
9	Laust Kaastrup Kjær	Denmark	1:50.52	
—	Sander Rustad-Johansen	Norway	DNF	
—	Teodor Hansen	Norway	DNF	PM

1500 metres
Place	Athlete	Nation	Time	Notes
1st place, gold medalist(s)	Kristian Uldbjerg Hansen	Denmark	3:34.84	PB
2nd place, silver medalist(s)	José Carlos Pinto	Portugal	3:35.10	PB
3rd place, bronze medalist(s)	Håkon Moe Berg	Norway	3:35.41	PB
4	Callum Davies	Australia	3:37.06	SB
5	Ibrahim Buras	Norway	3:38.73	PB
6	Wiktor Miłkowski	Poland	3:42.28	
7	Vetle Farbu-Solbakken	Norway	3:42.34	PB
8	Joseph Rogers	United Kingdom	3:44.71	
9	Miguel De La Torre	Spain	3:53.76	
10	Markus Kirk Kjeldsen	Denmark	3:55.97	
11	Andreas Fjeld Halvorsen	Norway	4:26.89	
12	Skjalg Kongssund	Norway	4:29.11	
—	Linus Berhnhard	Switzerland	DNF	
—	Eivind Øygard	Norway	DNF	PM
—	Ben Claridge	Great Britain	DNF	PM

=== Women's ===
200 metres
Place	Athlete	Nation	Time	Notes
1st place, gold medalist(s)	Josefine Tomine Eriksen	Norway	23.74	SB
2nd place, silver medalist(s)	Malin Furuhaug	Norway	24.00	PB
3rd place, bronze medalist(s)	Hannah Murai-Ubby	Norway	24.18	PB
4	Denise Eriksson	Sweden	24.26	SB
5	Maja Emilia Medic	Norway	24.47	
6	Lilje Patey	Norway	24.67	
7	Miranda Lauvstad	Norway	25.05	
			Wind: (+1.0 m/s)	

400 metres
Place	Athlete	Nation	Time	Notes
1st place, gold medalist(s)	Elisabeth Slettum	Norway	53.61	SB
2nd place, silver medalist(s)	Laura van der Veen	Norway	53.74	
3rd place, bronze medalist(s)	Borghild Holstad	Norway	53.75	PB
4	Line Al-Saiddi	Norway	53.87	
5	Nora Haugen	Norway	54.55	
6	Maren Amundsen	Norway	54.91	
7	Anne Kirkegaard	Denmark	55.08	SB
8	Kaitesi Ertzgaard	Norway	55.53	

800 metres
Place	Athlete	Nation	Time	Notes
1st place, gold medalist(s)	Aníta Hinriksdóttir	Iceland	2:03.72	
2nd place, silver medalist(s)	Malin Ingeborg Nyfors	Norway	2:03.91	
3rd place, bronze medalist(s)	Nina Vuković	Croatia	2:03.93	
4	Hannah Kinane	Sweden	2:07.09	
5	Eilén Brenne	Norway	2:09.26	
6	Josefin Heier	Norway	2:10.86	SB
7	Silje Lindstad	Norway	2:15.02	SB
8	Selma Boesen Skisaker	Norway	2:15.89	
—	Solveig Vråle	Sweden	DNF	PM

1500 metres
Place	Athlete	Nation	Time	Notes
1st place, gold medalist(s)	Ingeborg Østgård	Norway	4:10.18	SB
2nd place, silver medalist(s)	Sofia Thøgersen	Denmark	4:10.33	
3rd place, bronze medalist(s)	Carmen Cernjul	Sweden	4:10.64	PB
4	Anne Gine Løvnes	Norway	4:10.83	PB
5	Selma Engdahl	Norway	4:13.48	PB
6	Malin Hoelsveen	Norway	4:13.60	SB
7	Marte Hovland	Norway	4:13.71	PB
8	Amalie Sæten	Norway	4:13.92	
9	Saga Provci	Sweden	4:15.46	PB
10	Sigrid Wahlberg	Norway	4:16.63	PB
11	Kristine Lande Dommersnes	Norway	4:17.06	SB
12	Vilde Våge Henriksen	Norway	4:22.50	PB
13	Sara Busic	Norway	4:24.62	SB
14	Maiken Homlung Prøitz	Norway	4:25.60	
15	Mia Helene Mørck	Denmark	4:29.16	
16	Venus Teffera	Norway	4:29.95	
—	Lovisa Lindh	Sweden	DNF	PM

100 Metres hurdles
Place	Athlete	Nation	Time	Notes
1st place, gold medalist(s)	Elea Jørstad Bock	Norway	12.97	PB
2nd place, silver medalist(s)	Martine Hjørnevik	Norway	13.07	PB
3rd place, bronze medalist(s)	Lovise Skarbøvik Andresen	Norway	13.38	SB
4	Lea Alise Gundersen	Norway	13.78	PB
5	Elise Hoel Ulseth	Norway	14.03	SB
6	Sunniva Indahl	Norway	14.10	SB
7	Lisa Wilker	Norway	14.32	
8	Oda Asdal Hansen	Norway	14.36	
			Wind: (+0.6 m/s)	

== See also ==
- 2025 Diamond League
