= Corentin Magnou =

French athlete (born 2001)

Personal information
- Nationality: French
- Born: 22 September 2001 (age 24)

Sport
- Sport: Athletics
- Event: Middle-distance running

Achievements and titles
- Personal best(s): 800m: 1:44.84 (Montreuil, 2025)

Corentin Magnou (born 22 September 2001) is a French middle-distance runner. He was third over 800 metres at both the 2025 French Indoor Athletics Championships and in the 800 metres at the 2025 European Athletics Team Championships First Division.

== Career ==
From Royan he is a member of US Tallence where he is a training partner of Gabriel Tual.

He was runner-up to Paul Anselmini over 800 metres at the 2023 French U23 Championships and competed at the 2023 European Athletics U23 Championships in Espoo, Finland.

He finished third over 800 metres at the French Indoor Athletics Championships in Miramas in February 2025.

He lowered his personal best to 1:44.84 for the 800 metres in Montreuil, France in June 2025. Later that month, he raced for France at the 2025 European Athletics Team Championships in Madrid, placing third in the 800 metres in the first division. He placed fourth over 800 metres the following month at the 2025 Summer World University Games in Germany.
