= David Barroso =

Spanish athlete (born 2001)

Personal information
- Born: 21 August 2001 (age 25)

Sport
- Sport: Athletics
- Event: Middle distance running

Achievements and titles
- Personal bests: 800m: 1:43.60 (2026); 1500m: 3:35.26 (2026)
Medal record
Men's athletics
Representing Spain
Summer World University Games
Gold medal – first place	2025 Bochum	800 m
Mediterranean Games
Silver medal – second place	2026 Taranto	800 m

David Barroso (born 21 August 2001) is a Spanish middle-distance runner. He won the 800 metres at the 2025 Summer World University Games, was a semi-finalist at the 2025 World Athletics Championships and finished fourth in the 2026 European Athletics Championships.

== Early life ==
He is from Extremadura. He graduated in Physical Activity and Sport and studied for a master's degree in physical and sports performance at the Pablo de Olavide University.

== Career ==
He runs as a member of Capex in Zafra. He was Spanish under-20 champion in the 800 metres in 2020 and Spanish under-23 champion over that distance in 2022. That year, he ran a personal best 1:48.47 for the 800m at the Spanish championships.

He set a personal best twice in May 2025; running the 800 metres in 1:45.39 in Castellón and then improving to 1:45.27 in Nerja, in a race in which that he claimed notable victories over his more-storied compatriots Mariano García and Josué Canales. He competed for Spain at the 2025 Summer World University Games in Bochum, Germany, winning the gold medal in the 800 metres in 1:47.64.

He finished fourth at the Spanish Athletics Championships in August 2025 over 800m, one hundredth of-a-second behind Pablo Sánchez-Valladares, but ran a new personal best of 1:43.95 the following week in Fribourg, a time that was better than Sánchez-Valladares' lifetime best which had also set that summer. As a result, he was selected ahead of Sánchez-Valladares for the third spot in the 800 metres for the Spanish team at the 2025 World Athletics Championships in Tokyo, Japan. He went on to reach the semi-finalist in Tokyo in the men's 800 metres.

In July 2026, he ran a personal best for the 800 metres of 1:43.83 at the Meeting Stanislas Nancy in France. Later that month he ran another new personal best of 1:43.60 at the Gyulai Istvan Memorial in Budapest. In August, he placed fourth in the 800 metres final at the European Championships in Birmingham, England. Competing in the Diamond League at the 2026 Athletissima in Lausanne, Switzerland on 21 August 2026, he placed seventh in the 800 metres.

== International competitions ==
Year	Competition	Venue	Position	Event	Result
Representing Spain
2022	Mediterranean U23 Championships	Pescara, Italy	3rd	800 m	1:47.71
2023	Mediterranean Indoor U23 Championships	Valencia, Spain	4th	800 m i	1:52.89
2025	World University Games	Bochum, Germany	1st	800 m	1:47.64
2025	World Championships	Tokyo, Japan	12th (sf)	800 m	1:44.27
2026	Ibero-American Championships	Lima, Peru	1st	800 m	1:46.30
2026	European Championships	Birmingham, United Kingdom	4th	800 m	1:45.75
2026	Mediterranean Games	Taranto, Italy	2nd	800 m	1:46.35
