= 2025 European Athletics U23 Championships – Men's 3000 metres steeplechase =

Men's 3000 metres steeplechase at the 2025 European Athletics U23 Championships
- Venue: Fana Stadion
- Location: Bergen, Norway
- Dates: 19 July (heats); 20 July (final)
- Competitors: 26 from 13 nations
- Winning time: 8:20.17 CR, PB

Medalists
gold medal	Maciej Megier	Poland
silver medal	Stefan Nillessen	Netherlands
bronze medal	Lourenço Rodrigues	Portugal

The men's 3000 metres steeplechase event at the 2025 European Athletics U23 Championships was held in Bergen, Norway, at Fana Stadion on 19 and 20 July.

== Records ==
Prior to the competition, the records were as follows:

Record	Athlete (nation)	Time (s)	Location	Date
European U23 record	Günther Weidlinger (AUT)	8:10.83	Sevilla, Spain	21 August 1999
Championship U23 record	Martin Pröll (AUT)	8:25.86	Bydgoszcz, Poland	19 July 2003

== Results ==
=== Heats ===
First 5 in each heat (Q) and the next 5 fastest (q) qualified for the final.

==== Heat 1 ====
Place	Athlete	Nation	Time	Notes
1	Youssef Boutayeb	France	8:41.60	Q
2	Cuma Özcan	Turkey	8:42.00	Q, PB
3	Stefan Nillessen	Netherlands	8:42.05	Q
4	Robin Müller	Germany	8:42.10	Q
5	Aarno Liebl	Switzerland	8:42.16 [.157]	Q
6	Tomáš Habarta	Czech Republic	8:42.16 [.158]	q
7	Adam Bajorski	Poland	8:48.07 [.066]	
8	Manex Civico	Spain	8:48.07 [.067]	
9	Ármin Lesták	Hungary	8:52.44	SB
10	Diogo Ávila	Portugal	8:54.11	
11	Ayoub Taissir	Italy	8:54.16	
12	Leandro Monteiro	Portugal	8:54.55	
13	Vebjørn Hovdejord	Norway	8:56.33	SB

==== Heat 2 ====
Place	Athlete	Nation	Time	Notes
1	Maciej Megier	Poland	8:39.09	Q
2	Lourenço Rodrigues	Portugal	8:39.50	Q, SB
3	Carlos Ángel	Spain	8:40.00	Q
4	Rubén Leonardo	Spain	8:40.07	Q
5	Silas Zahlten	Germany	8:40.32	Q, PB
6	Pierre Boudy	France	8:41.25	q
7	Kurt Lauer	Germany	8:41.48	q, PB
8	Francesco Mazza	Italy	8:41.72	q, PB
9	Oscar Thebaud	France	8:41.77	q
10	Marián Dražan	Czech Republic	8:50.21	
11	Clément Labar	Belgium	8:54.12	
12	Diyar Ergüven	Turkey	9:15.07	
13	Camilo Irarragorri	Switzerland	9:15.46	

=== Final ===
Place	Athlete	Nation	Time	Notes
1st place, gold medalist(s)	Maciej Megier	Poland	8:20.17	CR, PB
2nd place, silver medalist(s)	Stefan Nillessen	Netherlands	8:20.48	NU23R
3rd place, bronze medalist(s)	Lourenço Rodrigues	Portugal	8:21.99	NU23R
4	Rubén Leonardo	Spain	8:25.07	PB
5	Carlos Ángel	Spain	8:26.65	PB
6	Robin Müller	Germany	8:29.38	
7	Pierre Boudy	France	8:30.03	
8	Tomáš Habarta	Czech Republic	8:30.45	
9	Silas Zahlten	Germany	8:32.76	PB
10	Aarno Liebl	Switzerland	8:42.22	
11	Cuma Özcan	Turkey	8:43.97	
12	Kurt Lauer	Germany	8:44.40	
13	Oscar Thebaud	France	8:51.47	
14	Youssef Boutayeb	France	8:55.84	
15	Francesco Mazza	Italy	9:01.56	
