= 2023 European Athletics U23 Championships – Men's 1500 metres =

Men's 1500 metres at the 2023 European Athletics U23 Championships
- Venue: Leppävaara Stadium
- Location: Espoo, Finland
- Dates: 13 July (heats); 15 July (final)
- Competitors: 20 from 12 nations
- Winning time: 3:43.35

Medalists
| gold medal | Stefan Nillessen | France |
| silver medal | Mohamed Attaoui | Spain |
| bronze medal | Samuel Pihlström | Sweden |

The men's 1500 metres event at the 2023 European Athletics U23 Championships was held in Espoo, Finland, at Leppävaara Stadium on 13 and 15 July.

== Records ==
Prior to the competition, the records were as follows:

| European U23 record | Jakob Ingebrigtsen (NOR) | 3:28.32 | Tokyo, Japan | 7 August 2021 |
| Championship U23 record | Wolfram Müller (GER) | 3:38.94 | Amsterdam, Netherlands | 14 July 2001 |

== Results ==
=== Heats ===
First 6 in each heat (Q) will qualify for the final.

==== Heat 1 ====
| Place | Athlete | Nation | Time | Notes |
|---|---|---|---|---|
| 1 | Mohamed Attaoui | Spain | 3:44.60 | Q |
| 2 | Noah Baltus | Netherlands | 3:44.88 | Q |
| 3 | Maciej Wyderka | Poland | 3:45.20 | Q |
| 4 | Matthew Stonier | Great Britain | 3:45.47 | Q |
| 5 | Santtu Heikkinen | Finland | 3:45.53 | Q |
| 6 | Viktor Idhammar | Sweden | 3:46.31 | Q |
| 7 | Thomas Piquart | France | 3:47.45 | |
| 8 | Rick van Riel | Netherlands | 3:48.67 | |
| 9 | Matteo Guelfo | Italy | 3:49.29 | |
| 10 | Nikita Bogdanovs | Latvia | 4:00.33 | |

==== Heat 2 ====
| Place | Athlete | Nation | Time | Notes |
|---|---|---|---|---|
| 1 | Flavien Szot | France | 3:48.82 | Q |
| 2 | Filip Ostrowski | Poland | 3:48.88 | Q |
| 3 | Samuel Pihlström | Sweden | 3:49.02 | Q |
| 4 | Stefan Nillessen | Netherlands | 3:49.06 | Q |
| 5 | Pol Oriach | Spain | 3:49.30 | Q |
| 6 | Jakub Davidík | Czech Republic | 3:49.37 | Q |
| 7 | Giuseppe Gravante | Italy | 3:49.59 | |
| 8 | Marcel Tobler | Austria | 3:50.50 | |
| 9 | Esten Hansen-Møllerud Hauen | Norway | 3:51.10 | |
| 10 | Martin Desmidt | France | 3:58.36 | |

=== Final ===
| Place | Athlete | Nation | Time | Notes |
|---|---|---|---|---|
| 1st place, gold medalist(s) | Stefan Nillessen | Netherlands | 3:43.35 | |
| 2nd place, silver medalist(s) | Mohamed Attaoui | Spain | 3:43.63 | |
| 3rd place, bronze medalist(s) | Samuel Pihlström | Sweden | 3:43.73 | |
| 4 | Matthew Stonier | Great Britain | 3:44.31 | |
| 5 | Pol Oriach | Spain | 3:44.85 | |
| 6 | Filip Ostrowski | Poland | 3:45.01 | |
| 7 | Noah Baltus | Netherlands | 3:45.49 | |
| 8 | Maciej Wyderka | Poland | 3:45.68 | |
| 9 | Santtu Heikkinen | Finland | 3:46.19 | |
| 10 | Viktor Idhammar | Sweden | 3:46.33 | |
| 11 | Flavien Szot | France | 3:46.64 | |
| — | Jakub Davidík | Czech Republic | DQ | TR 17.4 |
