= Thomas Cowan (runner) =

New Zealand middle-distance runner (born 2005)

Personal information
- Born: 10 December 2005 (age 20)

Sport
- Sport: Athletics
- Event: Middle-distance running

Achievements and titles
- Personal best(s): 800m: 1:46.83 (Boston, 2026)

Thomas Cowan (born 10 December 2005) is a New Zealand middle-distance runner who specialises in the 800 metres. He equalled the New Zealand indoor national record in 2026.

== Early and personal life ==
From Auckland, Cowan is the son of New Zealand international runner, and three-time former national 400 metres champion, Nick Cowan. His mother, Jo Harlick, was a physiotherapist for New Zealand at the 2004 Athens Olympics. He attended Westlake Boys High School. He played numerous sports before focusing on athletics after he placed fifth in the junior boys' 800 metres at the 2020 New Zealand Secondary Schools Track, Field and Road Championships in Tauranga.

== Career ==
Cowan became a member of North Harbour Bays Athletics, and began to be coached as a youngster by George McConachy, who had also previously coached his father, Nick. He won age-group 800 metres silver medals at the 2022 and 2023 New Zealand Secondary Schools Championships, as well as the 2022 New Zealand U20 Track & Field Championships in Wellington. In December 2023 Cowan ran an 800 metres personal best of close to a second-and-a-half in winning in 1:49.14 at the Daikin Night of 5s event at the AUT Millennium in Auckland. He represented New Zealand at the 2024 World Athletics U20 Championships in Lima, Peru.

Competing at the 2026 BU David Hemery Valentine Invitational in Boston, Cowan equaled the New Zealand indoor national record of James Harding for the 800 metres with a time of 1:46.83 in February 2026, although Harding lowered the record again later that month. The following week, Cowan also ran a time of 1:46.84 as he was the top collegiate finisher in the 800 m at the Saucony Battle for Boston.

In March 2026, Cowan ran 1:51.26 in the heats of the 800 m at the 2026 World Athletics Indoor Championships in Toruń, Poland.
