= 2025 European Athletics U23 Championships – Men's 1500 metres =

Men's 1500 metres at the 2025 European Athletics U23 Championships
- Venue: Fana Stadion
- Location: Bergen, Norway
- Dates: 17 July (heats); 19 July (final)
- Competitors: 26 from 13 nations
- Winning time: 3:44.87

Medalists
gold medal	Stefan Nillessen	Netherlands
silver medal	Paul Anselmini	France
bronze medal	Filip Rak	Poland

The men's 1500 metres event at the 2025 European Athletics U23 Championships was held in Bergen, Norway, at Fana Stadion on 17 and 19 July.

== Records ==
Prior to the competition, the records were as follows:

Record	Athlete (nation)	Time (s)	Location	Date
European U23 record	Jakob Ingebrigtsen (NOR)	3:28.32	Tokyo, Japan	7 August 2021
Championship U23 record	Wolfram Müller (GER)	3:38.94	Amsterdam, Netherlands	14 July 2001

== Results ==
=== Heats ===
First 4 in each heat (Q) and the next 4 fastest (q) qualified for the final.

==== Heat 1 ====
Place	Athlete	Nation	Time	Notes
1	Stefan Nillessen	Netherlands	3:43.90	Q
2	Filip Rak	Poland	3:43.92	Q
3	Teo Dabos	France	3:43.96	Q
4	Ferenc Soma Kovács	Hungary	3:44.10	Q
5	Thomas Bridger	Great Britain	3:44.17	q
6	Simone Valduga	Italy	3:44.18	q
7	João Santos	Portugal	3:45.25	q
8	Alessandro Pasquinucci	Italy	3:46.12	q
9	Uğur Kemal Deri̇n	Turkey	3:46.14	
10	Jan Dillemuth	Germany	3:46.54	
11	Vetle Farbu-Solbakken	Norway	3:48.44	
12	Christoph Schrick	Germany	3:50.93	
13	Ahmet Civci	Turkey	3:56.38	

==== Heat 2 ====
Place	Athlete	Nation	Time	Notes
1	Paul Anselmini	France	3:44.92	Q
2	Anas Lagtiy Chaoudar	France	3:44.93	Q
3	Nino Jambrešić	Croatia	3:45.31	Q
4	Martín Segurola	Spain	3:45.39	Q
5	Lughaidh Mallon	Ireland	3:46.73	
6	Luca Santorum	Italy	3:47.12	
7	Mikkel Blikstad Thomassen	Norway	3:47.54	
8	Wiktor Miłkowski	Poland	3:48.63	
9	Tim Kalies	Germany	3:48.96	
10	Ioann Lobles	Netherlands	3:51.17	
11	Ryan Martin	Great Britain	3:51.82	
12	Bálint Szinte	Hungary	3:54.41	
13	Emi̇n Berke Murathan	Turkey	3:56.51	

=== Final ===
Place	Athlete	Nation	Time	Notes
1st place, gold medalist(s)	Stefan Nillessen	Netherlands	3:44.87	
2nd place, silver medalist(s)	Paul Anselmini	France	3:45.35	
3rd place, bronze medalist(s)	Filip Rak	Poland	3:45.42	
4	Anas Lagtiy Chaoudar	France	3:45.88	
5	Ferenc Soma Kovács	Hungary	3:46.23	
6	Martín Segurola	Spain	3:46.81	
7	Simone Valduga	Italy	3:47.20	
8	Teo Dabos	France	3:48.35	
9	João Santos	Portugal	3:48.45	
10	Alessandro Pasquinucci	Italy	3:48.74	
11	Nino Jambrešić	Croatia	3:56.04	
