= Maciej Wyderka =

Polish track and field athlete

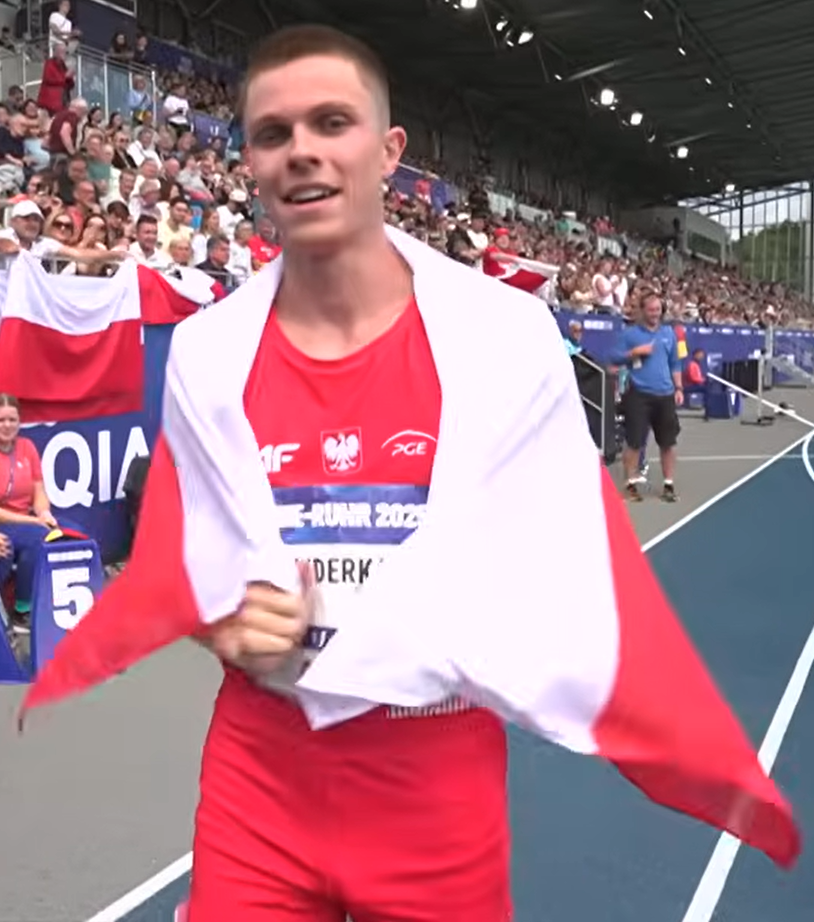
- At the 2025 Summer University Games

Personal information
- Full name: Maciej Michał Wyderka
- Born: 29 July 2002 (age 24) Piekary Śląskie, Poland
- Education: Academy of Physical Education Katowice

Sport
- Country: Poland
- Sport: Athletics
- Events: 800 metres, 1500 metres

Achievements and titles
- Personal bests: 400 m: 48.87 (2021); 800 m: 1:43.79 (2026); 1500 m: 3:34.77 (2025)
Medal record
World University Games
Gold medal – first place	2021 Chengdu	800 m
Silver medal – second place	2025 Bochum	800 m

Maciej Michał Wyderka (born 29 July 2002) is a Polish track and field athlete. He won a gold medal in the 800 metres at the 2021 Summer World University Games. Wyderka also competed for Poland at the 2024 Summer Olympics.

== International competitions ==
Representing Poland
Year	Competition	Venue	Position	Event	Time
2021	European U20 Championships	Tallinn, Estonia	13th (sf)	800 m	1:50.87
2023	European U23 Championships	Espoo, Finland	8th	1500 m	3:45.68
2023	World University Games	Chengdu, China	1st	800 m	1:49.09
2024	European Championships	Rome, Italy	9th (h)	1500 m	3:40.37
2024	Olympic Games	Paris, France	20th (rep)	1500 m	3:36.79
2025	European Indoor Championships	Apeldoorn, Netherlands	8th (sf)	800 m	1:46.17
2025	World University Games	Bochum, Germany	2nd	800 m	1:48.01
2025	World Championships	Tokyo, Japan	19th (sf)	800 m	1:45.55
2026	World Indoor Championships	Toruń, Poland	7th (sf)	800 m	1:44.59
2026	European Championships	Birmingham, United Kingdom	17th (h)	800 m	1:46.58
