= Ivan Pelizza =

Swiss middle-distance runner

Personal information
- Born: 17 December 2000 (age 25)

Sport
- Sport: Athletics
- Event: Middle-distance running

Achievements and titles
- Personal best: 800 m: 1:44.53 (2025)

Ivan Pelizza (born 17 December 2000) is a Swiss middle-distance runner. He was the Swiss national indoor champion over 800 metres in 2024.

== Early life ==
From Zurich, was a keen football player in his youth, featuring as a centre back for SV Seebach, GC at under-13 level before training as part of the academy at FC Red Star Zurich, before later focusing on athletics.

== Career ==
Pelizza trains at LC Zurich based in the Letzigrund stadium, where he is coached by Julia Stokar and Beat Ammann. He was runner-up at the senior Swiss Athletics Championships in Bellinzona in 2023. That year, he was Swiss U23 champion. He won the Swiss Indoor Athletics Championships in St. Gallen in February 2024 over 800 metres beating outdoor champion Ramon Wipfli and defending champion Robin Tester.

Pelizza was unable to try and defend his national indoor title in February 2025 due to illness. However, he still qualified through his ranking to represent Switzerland at the 2025 European Athletics Indoor Championships in Apeldoorn, Netherlands in March 2025 over 800 metres.

In June 2025, running at the Montreuil International Meeting, Pelizza ran a time of 1:45.01 for the 800 metres to move to second on the Swiss all-time list for the distance behind André Bucher. He finished fifth over 800 metres competing for Switzerland at the 2025 European Athletics Team Championships First Division in Madrid, Spain running 1:45.44 for the third fastest time of his career. He qualified for the final at the 2025 World University Games in July in Germany, placing fifth overall. He finished eighth in 1:45.52 in the Diamond League at the 2025 Athletissima in wet conditions in Lausanne. He competed at the 2025 World Athletics Championships in Tokyo, Japan, in September 2025 in the men's 800 metres.

Pelizza won the Swiss Indoor Championships over 800 metres on 1 March 2026, running 1:49.82 in the final. Later that month, he was a semi-finalist in the 800 m at the 2026 World Athletics Indoor Championships in Toruń, Poland in March 2026. In August, he competed at the 2026 European Athletics Championships in Birmingham, England, in the 800 metres.
