= Filip Rak =

Polish athlete (born 2003)

Personal information
- Nationality: Polish
- Born: 3 February 2003 (age 23)

Sport
- Sport: Athletics
- Events: Middle distance, Cross Country

Achievements and titles
- Personal bests: 800m: 1:45.97 (Olkusz, 2024); 1500m 3:32:53 (Rome, 2025); Mile: 3:50.92 (London, 2024); 3000m: 7:56.51 (Toruń, 2024)
Medal record
Men's athletics
Representing Poland
European U23 Championships
Bronze medal – third place	2025 Bergen	1500m

Filip Rak (born 3 February 2003) is a Polish middle distance and cross country runner. He is the Polish indoor champion over 1500 metres and 3000 metres, and national U23 record holder over 1500 metres indoors and outdoors.

== Career ==
He broke the Polish U18 record for the 1500 metres in Gdańsk in August 2020, running 3:45.86. He finished ninth at the 2021 European Athletics U20 Championships over 1500 metres in Tallinn.

He won the Polish U20 1500 metres indoors title in February 2022. He qualified for the final in the Men's 1500 metres at the 2022 World Athletics U20 Championships in Cali, Colombia, placing tenth overall.

He finished fourth in the Polish national cross country championship in November 2023 and was part of the Polish team that finished seventh at the 2023 European Cross Country Championships in Brussels the following month.

He finished eighth at the 2024 Copernicus Cup over 1500 metres in February 2024, and broke the Polish U23 indoors record with a time of 3:30.37. The following week he claimed Polish national titles over 1500 metres and 3000 metres indoors, running a 3000m personal best of 7:56.51.

In May 2024, in Olkusz he ran a time of 1:45.97 in the 800 meters. The following week he lowered his outdoor 1500 metres personal best to 3:33.74 in Chorzów, a Polish national U23 outdoors record which met the qualifying standard for the 2024 European Championships in Rome. The time also places him third on the all-time Polish list. He competed at the 2024 Summer Olympics over 1500 metres.

He ran a personal best 3:32.53 for the 1500 metres at the Diamond League event at the 2025 Golden Gala in Rome on 6 June 2025. He finished third over 1500 metres competing for Poland at the 2025 European Athletics Team Championships First Division in Madrid on 29 June 2025. He won the bronze medal in the 1500 metres at the 2025 European Athletics U23 Championships in Bergen, Norway running a time of 3:45.42.

In September 2025, he competed at the 2025 World Championships in Tokyo, Japan, without advancing to the semi-finals.

== Personal life ==
He runs for AZS Politechnika Opolska club and attends the University of Opole.
