= Kevin Kamenschak =

Austrian runner (born 2004)

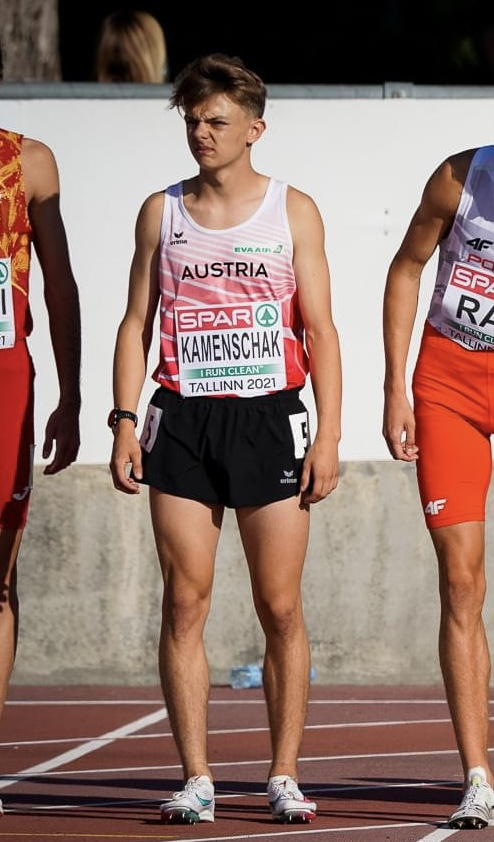
- Kamenschak in 2021

Personal information
- Born: 18 January 2004 (age 22)

Sport
- Sport: Athletics
- Event(s): Middle-distance running, cross country running
Medal record
Men's athletics
Representing Austria
European U20 Championships
Silver medal – second place	2023 Jerusalem	1500 m
Bronze medal – third place	2023 Jerusalem	5000 m

Kevin Kamenschak (born 18 January 2004) is an Austrian middle-distance and cross country runner. He has won the Austrian Indoor Athletics Championships over 1500 metres and 3000 metres and was senior Austrian cross country champion in 2025, and a double medalist at the 2023 European Athletics U20 Championships.

== Career ==
A member of ATSV Linz LA in Linz, Kamenschak won the 1500 metres at the 2021 Austrian Indoor Athletics Championships. He represented Austria at the 2022 World Athletics U20 Championships in Cali, Colombia, qualifying for the final of the 1500 metre, placing eighth overall.

Kamenschak won the silver medals behind Niels Laros in the 1500m at the 2023 European Athletics U20 Championships in Jerusalem, Israel. Later at the championships, he also won a bronze medal over 5000 metres. Later that year, Kamenschak missed the Austrian 5 km record by one second and finished in 25th place overall at the 2023 World Athletics Road Running Championships in Riga, Latvia.

Kamenschak won the 1500 metres title again at the 2024 Austrian Indoor Athletics Championships. That year, Kamenschak was eighth in the men's U23 race at the 2024 European Cross Country Championships in Antalya, Turkey.

Ahead of the 2025 season, Kamenschak left Linz to base himself in Vienna where he began to train with Olympic athlete Raphael Pallitsch. In February 2025, he was runner-up to Pallitsch in the 1500 metres at the Austrian Indoor Championships. He also placed third behind Pallitsch in the 3000 metres at the championships.

In November 2025, Kamenschak won the senior men's title at the Austrian Cross Country Championships. He subsequently competed at the 2025 European Cross Country Championships in Portugal. He won the 1500m title at the Austrian Indoor Athletics Championships with a time of 3:44.06. He also won the 3000 metres at the Championships.
