= 2026 World Athletics Indoor Championships – Men's 800 metres =

Men's 800 metres at the 2026 World Athletics Indoor Championships
- Venue: Kujawsko-Pomorska Arena Toruń
- Location: Toruń, Poland
- Dates: 20 March (round 1); 21 March (semi-finals); 22 March (final)
- Winning time: 1:44.24

Medalists
gold medal	Cooper Lutkenhaus	United States
silver medal	Eliott Crestan	Belgium
bronze medal	Mohamed Attaoui	Spain

The men's 800 metres at the 2026 World Athletics Indoor Championships took place on the short track of the Kujawsko-Pomorska Arena Toruń in Toruń, Poland, on 20, 21 and 22 March 2026. This was 22nd time the event was contested at the World Athletics Indoor Championships. Athletes qualified by achieving the entry standard or by their World Athletics Ranking in the event.

== Background ==
The men's 800 metres was contested 21 times before 2026, at every previous edition of the World Athletics Indoor Championships.

Records before the 2026 World Athletics Indoor Championships
Record	Athlete (nation)	Time (s)	Location	Date
World record	Josh Hoey (USA)	1:42.50	Boston, United States	24 January 2026
2026 World Lead	Josh Hoey (USA)	1:42.50	Boston, United States	24 January 2026
Championship record	Wilson Kipketer (DEN)	1:42.67	Paris, France	9 March 1997

== Qualification ==
For the men's 800 metres, the qualification period ran from 1 November 2025 until 8 March 2026. Athletes could qualify by achieving the entry standard of 1:45.90 s. Athletes could also qualify by virtue of their World Athletics Ranking for the event or by virtue of their World Athletics Indoor Tour wildcard. There was a target number of 30 athletes.

== Results ==
=== Round 1 ===
Round 1 was held on 20 March, starting at 13:26 (UTC+1) in the morning. First 2 of each heat (Q) plus 6 fastest times (q) qualified to the semi-finals.

==== Heat 1 ====
Place	Athlete	Nation	Time	Notes
1	Peter Bol	Australia	1:45.87	Q, PB
2	Allon Tatsunami Clay	Japan	1:46.08	Q
3	Navasky Anderson	Jamaica	1:46.34	q
4	Ivan Pelizza	Switzerland	1:46.53	q
5	Corentin Le Clezio	France	1:47.34	

==== Heat 2 ====
Place	Athlete	Nation	Time	Notes
1	Marino Bloudek	Croatia	1:46.20	Q
2	Cooper Lutkenhaus	United States	1:46.24	Q
3	Handal Roban	Saint Vincent and the Grenadines	1:46.58	q
4	Alexander Stepanov	Germany	1:46.75	
5	Guilherme Orenhas	Brazil	1:47.75	PB

==== Heat 3 ====
Place	Athlete	Nation	Time	Notes
1	Eliott Crestan	Belgium	1:45.51	Q
2	Mohamed Attaoui	Spain	1:45.75	Q
3	Slimane Moula	Algeria	1:46.13	q
4	Abdullahi Hassan	Canada	1:46.47	q
5	Malik Skupin-Alfa	Germany	1:46.60	

==== Heat 4 ====
Place	Athlete	Nation	Time	Notes
1	Mark English	Ireland	1:46.42	Q
2	Filip Ostrowski	Poland	1:46.61	Q
3	Uku Renek Kronbergs	Estonia	1:46.71	NR
4	Nathan Cumberbatch	Trinidad and Tobago	1:46.95	NR
5	Elvin Josué Canales	Spain	1:47.30	
6	Hazem Miawad	Egypt	1:48.14	

==== Heat 5 ====
Place	Athlete	Nation	Time	Notes
1	Ben Pattison	Great Britain	1:47.48	Q
2	Jordan Terrasse	France	1:47.64	Q
3	Mohamed Ali Gouaned	Algeria	1:48.20	
4	Jan Vukovič	Slovenia	1:50.83	
5	Thomas Cowan	New Zealand	1:51.26	
	Bob Abdelrahim	Australia	DQ	TR17.2.3

==== Heat 6 ====
Place	Athlete	Nation	Time	Notes
1	Noah Kibet	Kenya	1:45.84	Q
2	Maciej Wyderka	Poland	1:46.15	Q
3	Sean Dolan	United States	1:46.17	q
4	Ryan Clarke	Netherlands	1:47.26	
5	James Harding	New Zealand	1:47:42	

=== Semi-finals ===
The semi-finals were held on 21 March, starting at 13:08 (UTC+1) in the afternoon.

==== Heat 1 ====
Place	Athlete	Nation	Time	Notes
1	Peter Bol	Australia	1:46.21	Q
2	Allon Tatsunami Clay	Japan	1:46.47	Q
3	Navasky Anderson	Jamaica	1:46.65	
4	Mark English	Ireland	1:46.70	
5	Ben Pattison	United Kingdom	1:46.85	
6	Abdullahi Hassan	Canada	1:47.05	

==== Heat 2 ====
Place	Athlete	Nation	Time	Notes
1	Cooper Lutkenhaus	United States	1:44.29	Q
2	Mohamed Attaoui	Spain	1:44.48	Q, NR
3	Maciej Wyderka	Poland	1:44.59	
4	Noah Kibet	Kenya	1:45.73	SB
5	Slimane Moula	Algeria	1:46.48	
6	Jordan Terrasse	France	1:47.85	

==== Heat 3 ====
Place	Athlete	Nation	Time	Notes
1	Eliott Crestan	Belgium	1:45.71	Q
2	Marino Bloudek	Croatia	1:45.92	Q
3	Sean Dolan	United States	1:46.45	
4	Filip Ostrowski	Poland	1:46.50	
5	Handal Roban	Saint Vincent and the Grenadines	1:46.51	
6	Ivan Pelizza	Switzerland	1:46.85	

=== Final ===
The final was held on 22 March, starting at 19:38 (UTC+1) in the evening.

Place	Athlete	Nation	Time	Notes
1st place, gold medalist(s)	Cooper Lutkenhaus	United States	1:44.24	
2nd place, silver medalist(s)	Eliott Crestan	Belgium	1:44.38	
3rd place, bronze medalist(s)	Mohamed Attaoui	Spain	1:44.66	
4	Peter Bol	Australia	1:45.14	AR
5	Marino Bloudek	Croatia	1:45.31	
6	Allon Tatsunami Clay	Japan	1:45.42	
