= Mohamed Attaoui =

Moroccan-Spanish athlete (born 2001)

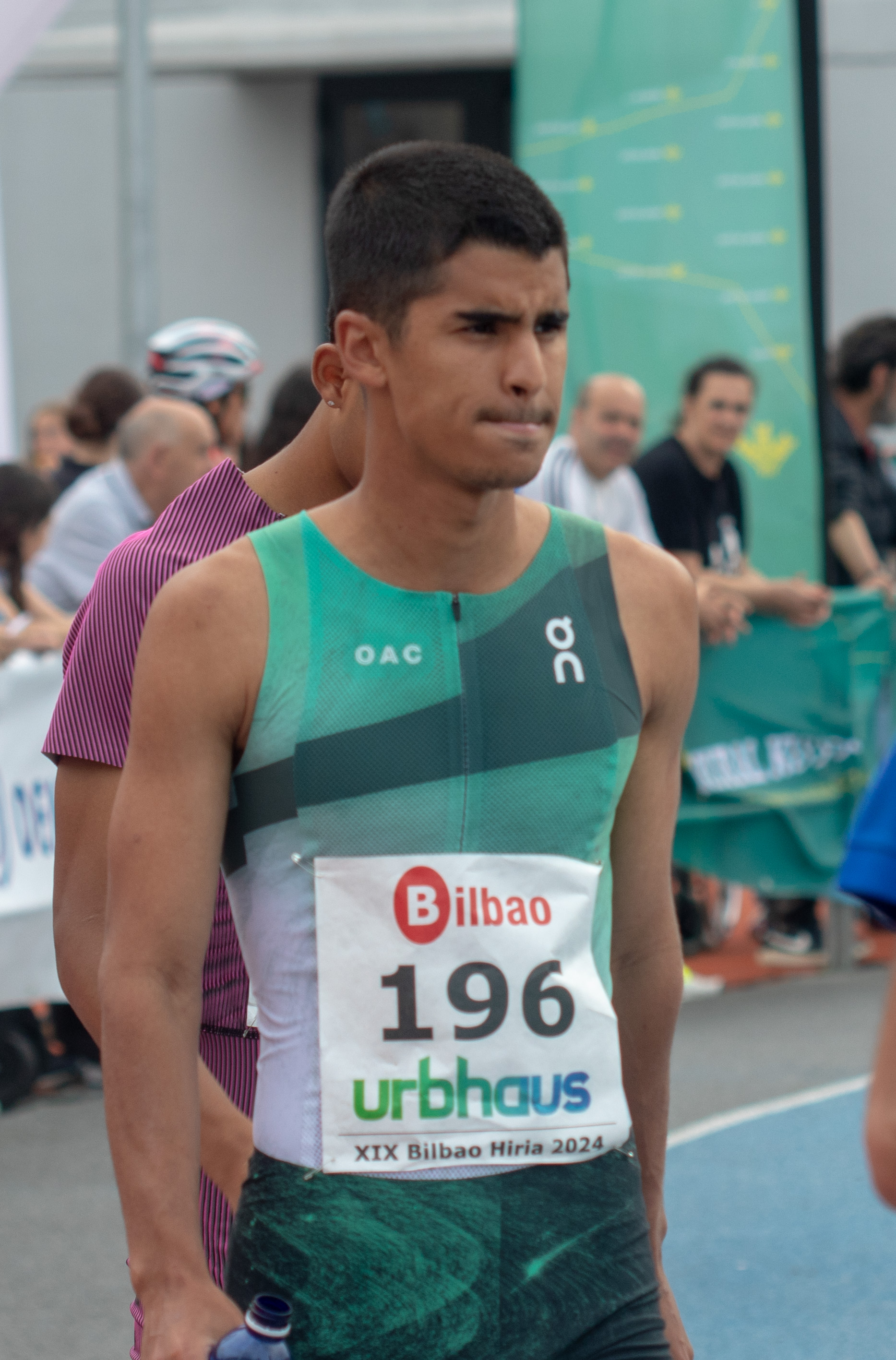
- Attaoui in 2024

Personal information
- Full name: Mohamed Attaoui Tijani
- Born: Mohamed Attaoui محمد العطاوي; 26 September 2001 (age 24) Beni Mellal, Morocco
- Height: 1.77 m (5 ft 10 in)
- Weight: 62 kg (137 lb)

Sport
- Country: Spain
- Sport: Athletics
- Events: 800 metres, 1500 metres
- Club: OAC Europe
- Coached by: Thomas Dreißigacker
Medal record
Men's Athletics
Representing Spain
World Indoor Championships
Bronze medal – third place	2026 Toruń	800 m
European Championships
Silver medal – second place	2024 Rome	800 m
Bronze medal – third place	2026 Birmingham	800 m
European Athletics Team Championships
Gold medal – first place	2025 Madrid	800 m
European U23 Championships
Silver medal – second place	2023 Espoo	1500 m

Mohamed Attaoui Tijani (born 26 September 2001) is a middle-distance runner, who specializes in the 800 metres and 1500 metres. Born in Morocco, he represents Spain internationally. He won a silver medal in the 1500 metres at the 2023 European Athletics U23 Championships.

He arrived in Spain at the age of six and settled in Torrelavega, Cantabria, in 2007.

On 2 September 2025, Attaoui ran 2:12.25 in the 1000 metres, which stands as the third fastest performance of all time.

== Personal bests ==
- 800 metres – 1:42.04 (Monaco 2024) NR
- 1000 metres – 2:12.25 (Trier 2025) NR
- 1500 metres – 3:31.82 (Turku 2026)
- 800 meters indoor - 1:44.48 (Torun 2026) NR AR
- 1000 meters indoor - 2:14.52 (Madrid 2026) NR
- 1500 metres indoor – 3:35.65 (Antequera 2026)
- 3000 metres indoor – 8:00.33 (San Sebastián 2022)

== Statistics ==
=== International competitions ===
Representing Spain
Year	Competition	Venue	Position	Event	Result
2022	Mediterranean U23 Championships	Pescara, Italy	2nd	1500 m	4:15.43
2023	Mediterranean U23 Indoor Championships	Valencia, Spain	1st	1500 m i	3:53.89
2023	European U23 Championships	Espoo, Finland	2nd	1500 m	3:43.63
2023	World Championships	Budapest, Hungary	11th (sf)	800 m	1:44.35
2023	World Road Running Championships	Riga, Latvia	24th	Road Mile	4:06.59
2024	World Indoor Championships	Glasgow, United Kingdom	8th (sf)	800 m i	1:45.68
2024	European Championships	Rome, Italy	2nd	800 m	1:45.20
2024	Olympic Games	Paris, France	5th	800 m	1:42.08
2025	European Indoor Championships	Apeldoorn, Netherlands	19th (h)	1500 m i	3:42.53
2025	World Championships	Tokyo, Japan	5th	800 m	1:42.21
2026	World Indoor Championships	Toruń, Poland	3rd	800 m i	1:44.66
2026	European Championships	Birmingham, United Kingdom	3rd	800 m	1:45.71
2026	World Ultimate Championship	Budapest, Hungary	13th (h)	800 m	1:45.12

=== Circuit performances ===
- Diamond League (podiums)
  - 2024: Herculis Monaco (2nd)
  - 2025: Bislett Oslo (2nd)
  - 2025: Meeting de Paris (1st)
  - 2025: Athletissima Lausanne (3rd)
- World Athletics Indoor Tour (Gold level meetings) (podiums)
  - 2024: Madrid (2nd)
