= Mehmet Çelik (runner) =

Turkish middle-distance runner (born 2001)

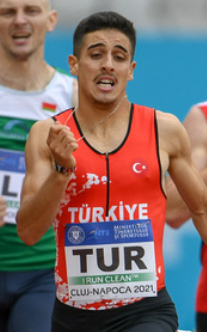

Personal information
- Nationality: Turkish
- Born: 1 December 2001 (age 24) Manisa, Turkey
- Education: Aydın Adnan Menderes University

Sport
- Country: Turkey
- Sport: Athletics
- Event: Middle-distance running
Medal record
Athletics
Representing Turkey
European Games
| Bronze medal – third place | 2023 Chorzów | 800 m |
Summer World University Games
| Bronze medal – third place | 2025 Rhine-Ruhr | 800 m |
Islamic Solidarity Games
| Silver medal – second place | 2025 Riyadh | 1500 m |
Summer Youth Olympics
| Bronze medal – third place | 2018 Buenos Aires | 800 m |

Mehmet Çelik (born 1 December 2001) is a Turkish middle-distance runner. He competed at the 2023 European Games, winning the bronze medal in the 800 metres event.
