= Ermias Girma =

Ethiopian athlete (born 2005)

Personal information
- Nationality: Ethiopian
- Born: 20 January 2005 (age 21) Ezha, Gurage Zone, Ethiopia

Sport
- Sport: Athletics
- Events: 800m, 1500m, 3000m

Achievements and titles
- Personal bests: 800m 1:44.36 (Lokeren, 2022); 1500m: 3:34.73 (Turku, 2024); 3000m: 7:40.42 (Tokyo, 2025)
Medal record
Men's athletics
Representing Ethiopia
2023 African Games
| Silver medal – second place | 2023 Accra | 1500 m |
World U20 Championships
| Gold medal – first place | 2022 Cali | 800m |
| Silver medal – second place | 2022 Cali | 1500m |

Ermias Girma (born 20 January 2005) is an Ethiopian middle-distance runner. He is a national champion and world under-20 champion in the 800 metres.

== Career ==
In April 2021, Girma won the 800 metres at the Ethiopian Athletics Championships in Addis Ababa in a time of 1:47.06.

He ran an 800 metres time of 1:44.36 in Lokeren, Belgium, in May 2022 and lowered his 1500m best to 3:36.28 later that month. He ran at the 2022 World Athletics Championships in Eugene, Oregon where he was finished fourth in his 800m heats qualifying heat in 1:49.36.

Girma won gold in the 800 metres and silver in the 1500 metres at the 2022 World Athletics U20 Championships in Cali, Colombia.

In February 2024, Girma was second in the 3000 metres at the World Athletics Indoor Tour event in Madrid in a time of 7:41.94. In March 2024, he was a silver medalist over 1500 metres at the 2023 African Games in Accra. He competed at the 2024 Summer Olympics over 1500 metres.

In May 2025, he was runner-up to Australia Jude Thomas who set a meeting record to win the Golden Grand Prix in Tokyo, Japan, Girma's time for the 3000m of 7:40.42 was also inside the previous record. In September 2025, he competed at the 2025 World Championships in Tokyo, Japan, without advancing to the semi-finals.
