= Maciej Megier =

Polish long-distance runner

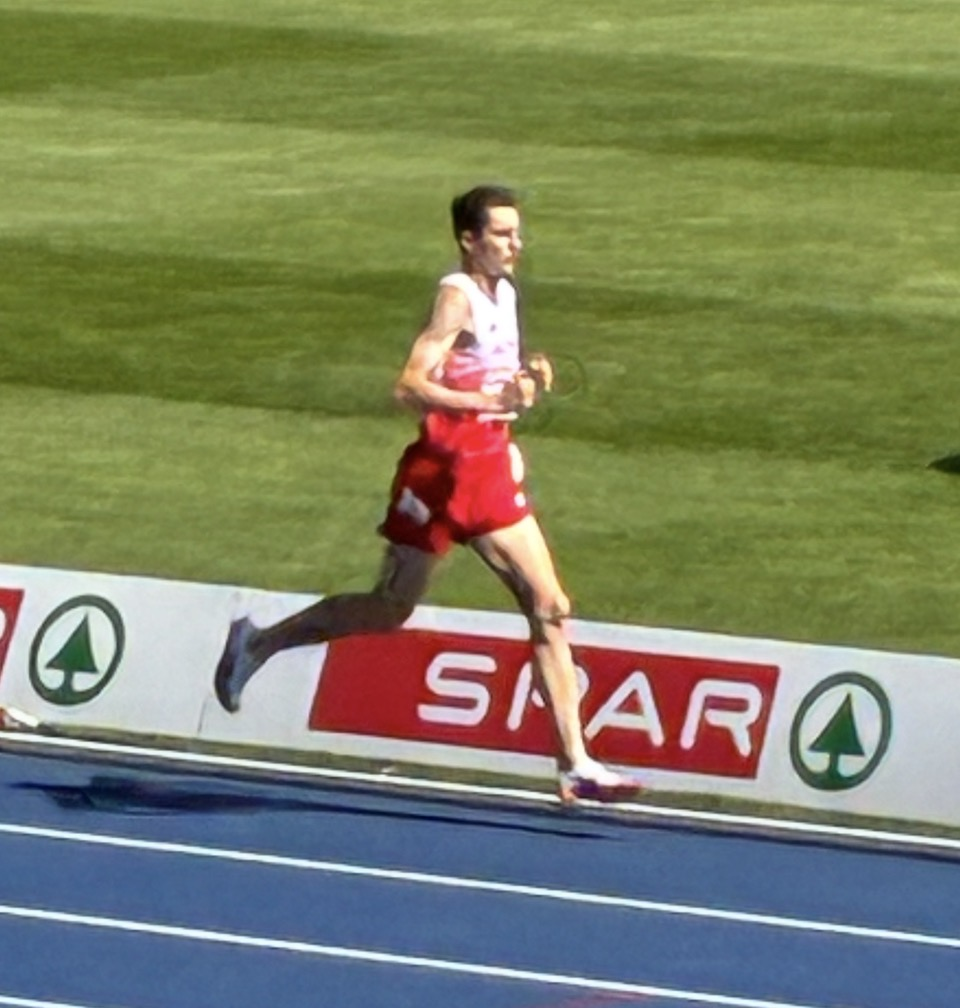
- Megier in 2026

Personal information
- Born: 26 April 2003 (age 23)

Sport
- Sport: Athletics
- Events: Long distance running, Cross country running
Medal record
Men's athletics
Representing Poland
European U23 Championships
Gold medal – first place	2025 Bergen	3000 metres steeplechase

Maciej Megier (born 26 April 2003) is a Polish steeplechaser. He is a multiple-time national champion over 10,000 metres and the 3000 metres steeplechase. He won the gold medal in the 3000m steeplechase at the 2025 European Athletics U23 Championships.

== Biography ==
Megier won the 3000 metres steeplechase at the 2023 Polish Championships in July in Gorzów Wielkopolski in 8:44.17.

Megier won the Polish 10,000m Championships in April 2024 in Ustka in 29:10.44. He won the 3000 metres steeplechase at the 2024 Polish Championships in June in Bydgoszcz in 8:38.75. He competed for Poland at the 2024 European Cross Country Championships in Istanbul, Turkey, and led briefly at the start before placing nineteenth in the men's U23 race.

Megier began his 2025 season by breaking Bronislaw Malinowski's Polish youth record in the 10,000m and won the Polish 10,000m Championships in April 2025 in Warsaw, in a time of 28:21.77. Later that year in Bydgoszcz at the Irena Szewińska Memorial, he ran 8:23.01 for the 3000 metres steeplechase to move to the top of the European U23 rankings.

Megier finished in fifth place in the 3000 metres steeplechase at the 2025 European Athletics Team Championships First Division in Madrid, Spain. He set a new polish under-23 record, and broke the championship record that had stood since 2003, to win the gold medal in the 3000m steeplechase in 8:20.17 at the 2025 European Athletics U23 Championships in Bergen, Norway, having previously posted the fastest qualifying time in the semifinals (8:39.09).

In July 2026, Megier won the 3000m steeplechase title at the senior Polish Championships in 8:24.11. In August, he competed at the 2026 European Athletics Championships in Birmingham, England, in the 3000 metres steeplechase.
