= Jordan Terrasse =

French middle-distance runner (born 2000)

Personal information
- Born: 11 April 2000 (age 26) Clermont-Ferrand, France
- Height: 180 cm (5 ft 11 in)
- Weight: 62 kg (137 lb)

Sport
- Country: France
- Sport: Athletics
- Event: Middle-distance running

Achievements and titles
- Personal bests: 400mH: 50.17 (Tarare, 2023); 800m: 1:44.42 (Fribourg, 2025); Indoor; 400m: 47.36 (Aubiere, 2024); 800m: 1:45.57 (Metz, 2026)

Jordan Terrasse (born 11 April 2000) is a French middle-distance runner. He won the 800 metres at the 2026 French Indoor Athletics Championships.

== Biography ==
From Auvergne, he is a member of Clermont Auvergne Athletics. He competed in the 400 metres hurdles before transitioning to the 800 metres. He finished third at the 2023 French Athletics Championships in the 400m hurdles and third in the 400 metres at the 2024 French Indoor Athletics Championships.

In August 2025, he ran a personal best 1:44.42 for the 800 metres in Fribourg, Switzerland. That month, he placed third in the 800 metres at the 2025 French Athletics Championships in 1:45.88, after being caught on the line by a fast-finishing Corentin Le Clezio. He placed sixth over 800 metres at the 2025 Summer World University Games in Germany.

In Metz in February 2026, he ran an indoors personal best of 1:45.57 for the 800 metres. The time met the automatic qualifying standard for the 2026 World Indoor Championships. He won the 800 metres title at the 2026 French Indoor Athletics Championships, running 1:46.37 in the final. He was a semi-finalist in the 800 m at the 2026 World Athletics Indoor Championships in Toruń, Poland in March 2026.

Competing at the Boris Hanzekovic Memorial in Zagreb, a World Athletics Continental Tour Gold meeting, on 26 June, Terrasse had victory in the 800 metres, running 1:44.77 ahead of Tshepiso Masalela and home favourite Marino Bloudek. On 25 July 2026, he placed fifth in the 800 metres at the 2026 French Championships.

== Personal life ==
Based in Lyon, outside athletics he trained in engineering.
