= Max Davies =

Canadian middle-distance runner (born 2003)

Personal information
- Born: 19 December 2003 (age 22)

Sport
- Sport: Athletics
- Event: Middle-distance running

Achievements and titles
- Personal bests: 800m: 1:47.94 (Toronto, 2025); 1500m: 3:33.86 (Oslo, 2025); Mile: 3:53.90 (Quebec City, 2025); Indoor; 1500m: 3:42.19 (Boston, 2025); Mile 3:53.24 (Boston, 2026); 3000m: 7:57.60 (Boston, 2025)

Max Davies (born 19 December 2003) is a Canadian middle-distance runner. He won the Canadian Athletics Championships over 1500 metres in 2025, and is the Canadian U23 national record holder.

== Early and personal life ==
Max Davies began his formal training at the Age of 9 under former Multisport Athlete, Coach and former Toronto Olympic Club athlete Paul DiSimone. For about 4 years, beginning sometime in 2013, Max represented Paul's local North York/North Toronto club Tri Solutions Toronto where under the guidance of Coach Paul, Max would establish himself as a City 800m Champion, a City XC Champion (Grade 7) & Runner Up (Grade 8), an Athletics Ontario (AO) Indoor 800m Champion, an AO Outdoor 1200m Provincial Champion, an AO XC Top 5 finisher, and awarded the 2016 Bantam Boys AO Distance Athlete Of The Year. Throughout a couple Summers Max would often visit the U.K. and would train and race with a local club the Yeovil Olympiads Athletic Club . After completing his XC season in his Grade 8 year, Max parted ways with Coach Paul and would join the Toronto Track Club in 2017 to further his development under Head Coach Galan Yousuf.

The following Spring of 2017 Galan would help Max become the TDESAA Grade 8 800m Silver Medalist, 1500m Champion & new 1500m City Record Holder with a time of 4:26.87 in the event, (a Public School Grade 8 record which still stands today).

Throughout HS Max would represent Northern Secondary School & continue to work with Galan and win the 2018 OFSAA 3000m his Grade 9 year in 8:57.74 (York University). That Fall he would follow up by winning the U16 Athletics Ontario XC Championship (King City, Ontario). In the Spring of 2019 Davies would finish 5th in the Junior Boys 1500m at the OFSAA Track & Field Championships (Guelph, Ontario). November 2019 Davies would go on to earn the Silver Medal at the Athletics Ontario U18 XC Championships (King City, Ontario), following up with an additional U18 Silver Medal at the Canadian Cross Country Championships (Abbotsford, BC).

Upon the completion of HS, Davies competed for a year at Iona University in New Rochelle, New York. In 2022, he returned to Ontario, Canada and the University of Guelph where he worked with coach Terry Radchenko who he knew from when Davies was training with Toronto Track Club.

== Career ==
In 2023, he placed second competing for the University of Guelph at the OUA Cross Country Championships, but missed the 2023 outdoor season through injury.

Indoors in January 2024, he ran a sub-four minute mile for the first time with 3:59.24. That indoor season, he set school, OUA championship and U Sports championship records, was OUA Athlete of the Year, and was nominated for U Sports Athlete of the Year. However, later had to miss the majority of the outdoor season with injury.

In March 2025, Davies won three titles at the U Sports indoor championships for the second consecutive year, and retained his title of Athlete of the Meet. In July 2025, he ran 3:35.04 at the Harry Jerome Classic to break the U23 Canadian 1500m record held by Graham Hood, placing second in the race to Nathan Green but finishing ahead of the United States international runner Samuel Prakel. Davies won the 2025 Canadian Athletics Championships over 1500 metres in Ottawa in August 2025. In Oslo, Norway, later that month, he set a new Canadian under-23 national record for the 1500 metres again, running 3:33.86, but missing the automatic standard for the 2025 World Championships by 0.86 seconds.

In January 2026, he signed a professional contract with Brooks Running. In his second race as a professional he ran an indoor personal best for the mile at the BU David Hemery Valentine Invitational in Boston, Massachusetts on 13 February, running 3:53.24. He competed in the mile at the 2026 Commonwealth Games in Glasgow, Scotland. Competing in the mile at the 2026 World Athletics Road Running Championships in Copenhagen, Davies ran a road personal best of 4:08.56.
