= Stefan Nillessen =

Dutch athlete (born 2003)

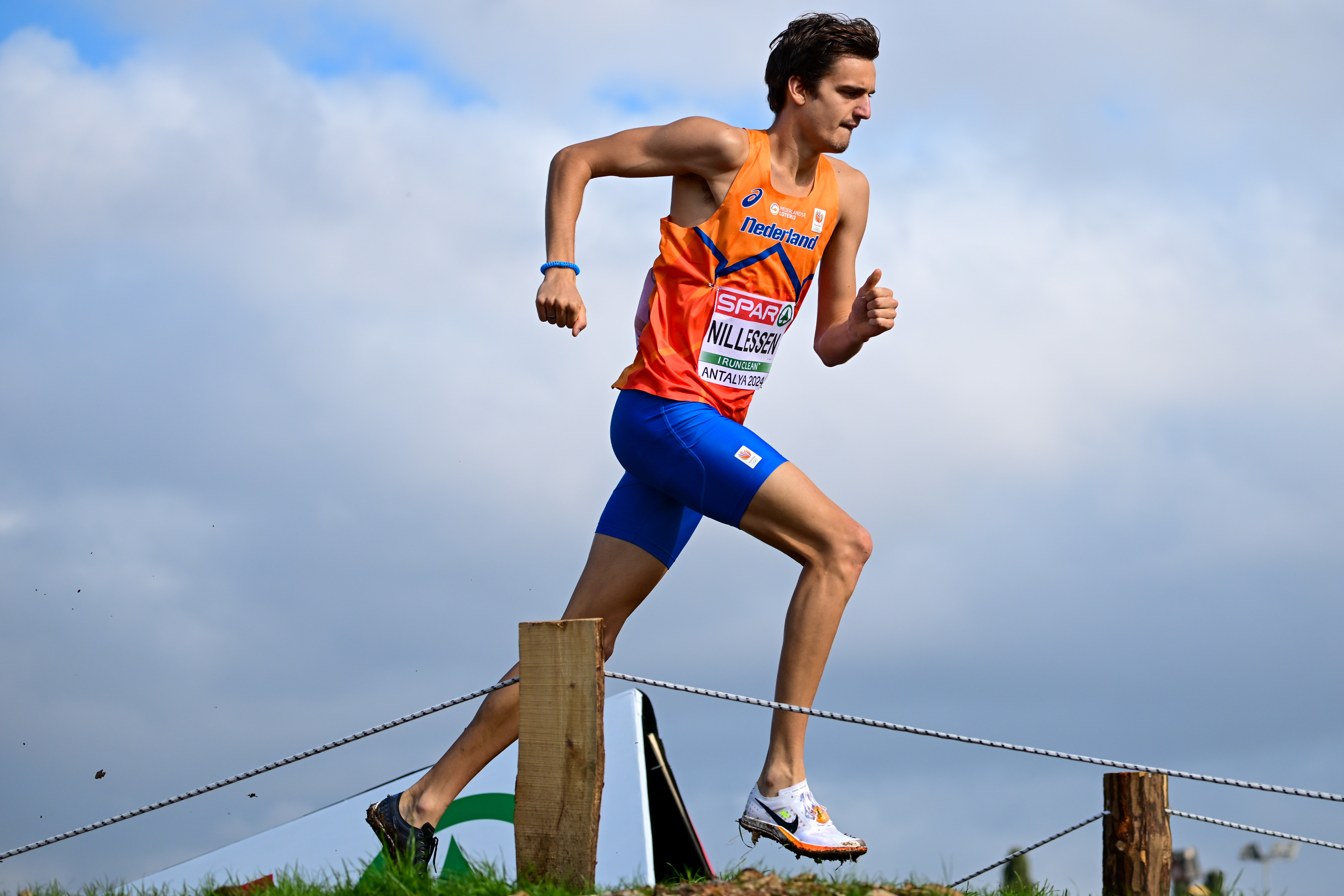
- Stefan Nillessen at the 2024 European Cross Country Championships in Antalya, Turkey

Personal information
- Nationality: Dutch
- Born: 2 January 2003 (age 23)
- Height: 1.95 m (6 ft 5 in)

Sport
- Sport: Athletics
- Event: Middle distance

Achievements and titles
- Personal bests: Outdoor; 800 m: 1:45.09 (2025); 1500 m: 3:29.23 (Paris, 2025) NR; Mile: 3:49.02 (Oslo, 2025); 3000 m: 8:05.65 (Utrecht, 2022); 3000 m s'chase: 8:20.48 (Bergen, 2025) NU23R; Indoor; 1500 m: 3:33.64 (Liévin, 2026) NR; Mile: 3:52.70 (Liévin, 2025) NR; 3000 m: 7:37.10 (Karlsruhe, 2025)
Medal record
Men's Athletics
Representing Netherlands
European Championships
Gold medal – first place	2026 Birmingham	1500 metres
European U23 Championships
Gold medal – first place	2025 Bergen	1500 metres
Gold medal – first place	2023 Espoo	1500 metres
Silver medal – second place	2025 Bergen	3000 m st.

Stefan Nillessen (born 2 January 2003) is a Dutch middle-distance runner. He is the reigning European champion in the 1500 metres having won the title at the 2026 European Athletics Championships. He was the 2024 Dutch champion and the 2025 Dutch indoor champion in the 1500 metres. He also represented the Netherlands at the 2024 Olympic Games.

== Biography ==
Nillessen was selected for the 1500 metres at the 2022 World Athletics U20 Championships in Cali, Colombia. He won gold in the 1500 metres at the 2023 European Athletics U23 Championships in Espoo, Finland.

Nillessen is one of a group of athletes coached by Tomasz Lewandowski. He signed a sponsorship deal with Nike in 2024. He ran a personal best of 3:34.32 for the 1500 metres in Turku, Finland, on 18 June 2024.

Nillessen won the Dutch national title over 1500m at the Dutch Athletics Championships in Hengelo, in June 2024. He competed at the 2024 Summer Olympics over 1500 metres and ran a personal best to qualify for the final. In the final he lowered his personal best to 3:30.75 to place ninth overall.

Competing in Karlsruhe, Germany, in February 2025, he won over 3000 metres in a Dutch indoor record time of 7:37.10. He ran a personal best 3:52.70 for the indoor mile in Liévin, Belgium, on 13 February 2025. The following weekend, he won the Dutch national indoor title at the Dutch Indoor Athletics Championships over 1500 metres. He was selected for the 2025 European Athletics Indoor Championships in Apeldoorn, Netherlands, where he reached the final of the 3000 metres.

Nillessen ran a personal best of 1:45.09 for the 800 metres in Hengelo on 9 June 2025. He improved his personal best on the mile to 3:49.02 in the Dream Mile at the 2025 Bislett Games, part of the 2025 Diamond League on 12 June 2025. He competed over 1500 metres at the 2025 Meeting de Paris, running a Dutch national record time of 3:29.23. He finished second in the 1500 metres at the 2025 European Athletics Team Championships First Division in Madrid on 29 June 2025. He retained his 1500m title at the 2025 European Athletics U23 Championships in Bergen, Norway, running a time of 3:44.87. He later also won a silver medal in the 3000 metres steeplechase at the same championships, finishing behind Maciej Megier of Poland, in a national U23 record of 8:20.48. In September 2025, he was a semi-finalist over 1500 metres at the 2025 World Championships in Tokyo, Japan.

On 19 February 2026, he lowered the Dutch indoor national record for the 1500 metres to 3:33.65 competing in Liévin, France. On 15 August, he was a surprise gold medalist in the 1500 metres at the 2026 European Championships in Birmingham, England, displaying a turn of speed on the home straight. Speaking after the race he said "I even surprised myself a little with that sprint finish to be honest. I knew I felt good, but you don't know how the others feel… When I got out of bed this morning, I really didn't think I was going to win the gold. Of course, I was hoping to be able to fight with the best and go for a medal…but gold was not something I was expecting". Competing at the 2026 World Athletics Road Running Championships in Copenhagen, he placed sixteenth in a Dutch record of 3:57.84 in the mile race.

== Personal life ==
He is from Groesbeek near Nijmegen. Nillessen comes from a famous running family from Groesbeek, known as "d'n Boes."
