= Matthew Erickson (runner) =

Canadian middle-distance runner (born 2003)

Personal information
- Nationality: Canadian
- Born: 11 March 2003 (age 23)

Sport
- Sport: Athletics
- Event: Middle-distance running

Achievements and titles
- Personal bests: 400 m: 47.04 (Eugene, 2025); 800 m: 1:44.49 (Los Angeles, 2025); 1500 m: 3:40.54 (Eugene, 2025); Mile: 3:59.27 (Boston, 2024)

Matthew Erickson (born 11 March 2003) is a Canadian middle-distance runner. He represented his country at the 2025 World Championships having won the 800 metres title at the 2025 NCAA Division I Indoor Track and Field Championships and being runner-up at that distance at the 2025 NCAA Outdoor Championships.

== Early life ==
He is from Nelson, British Columbia and was educated at Hume Elementary School. He showed aptitude for athletics at an early age, winning the 10-year-old boys 60 m dash, 600 m run, 1,000 m run and long jump at the BC Elementary Track and Field Championships in 2013. He later attended the University of Oregon in the United States.

== Career ==
In 2024, Erickson ran a personal best of 1:45.74 at the Portland Track Festival, placing him in the top-10 among Canadian men over 800 metres all-time. He followed this by finishing third at the Canadian Olympic Trials. In October of that year, he became the first Canadian track athlete to sign a Name, Image and Likeness (NIL) deal with U.S. sportswear brand Nike. He won the 800 metres at the 2025 NCAA Division I Indoor Track and Field Championships in Virginia Beach in March 2025 competing for the University of Oregon.

In May 2025, he set a personal best for the 300 metres of 47.04 seconds at the Oregon Twilight Meet. He finished second behind Sam Whitmarsh at the NCAA Outdoor Championships in Eugene, Oregon in the 800 metres in June 2025, running a seasons best time of 1:46.32, despite having fallen to seventh place at the final turn.

He ran a personal best for the 800 metres at the Sunset Tour Los Angeles on 12 July 2025, with a time of 1:44.49. He competed at the 2025 World Athletics Championships in Tokyo, Japan, in September 2025 in the men's 800 metres.

== International competitions ==
Erickson competed at the 2022 World Athletics U20 Championships in the 800 metres and 1500 metres, in Cali, Colombia in August 2022.

He was named in the Canadian team for the 2025 World Athletics Championships in Tokyo, Japan.

| Year | Competition | Event | Time | Place | Ref |
|---|---|---|---|---|---|
| 2021 | World U20 Championships | 800 m | 1:52.38 | 21st | |
| 2022 | World U20 Championships | 800 m | 1:48.42 | 9th | |
| 2022 | World U20 Championships | 1500 m | 3:55.16 | 32nd | |

== Media ==
Erickson shares highlights of the 2024-25 season, learning to race by focusing on aerobic strength, and his life story on "Talking in Ovals" show.
