= Paul Anselmini =

French middle-distance runner (born 2003)

Personal information
- Born: 2 August 2003 (age 23) Paris, France
- Height: 173 cm (5 ft 8 in)
- Weight: 62 kg (137 lb)

Sport
- Country: France
- Sport: Athletics
- Event: 800 metres

Achievements and titles
- Personal bests: Outdoor; 800 m: 1:44.73 (Rome, 2024); 1500 m: 3:31.36 (Paris, 2026); Mile: 3:52.80 (Copenhagen, 2024); Indoor; 800 m: 1:47.09 (Nantes, 2025); 1500 m: 3:36.72 (Lyon, 2025); Mile: 3:55.18 (Ostrava, 2025)
Medal record
Men's Athletics
Representing France
European U23 Championships
Silver medal – second place	2025 Bergen	1500m
Bronze medal – third place	2023 Espoo	800m

Paul Anselmini (born 2 August 2003) is a French middle-distance runner. In 2025, he became the French U23 record holder and won the French Indoor Athletics Championships over 1500 metres.

== Biography ==
Anselmini placed eighth overall in the 800 metres at the 2021 World Athletics U20 Championships in Kenya. He won the 2023 French U23 champion over 800m and was a bronze medalist at the 2023 European Athletics U23 Championships in Espoo, in the men's 800 metres, finishing behind Great Britain’s Ethan Hussey and his compatriot and gold medal winner Yanis Meziane.

Anselmini is a member of the Entente Franconville Césame Val-d'Oise (EFCVO) athletics club in Val-d'Oise. He was a member of an Adidas team which beat the French Ekiden record (a six-runner team marathon) by one second at the Maïf Ekiden in Paris, with Anselmini completing the fifth leg. The record, which had stood since 1996, was surpassed by their combined time of 2:04:40. The team also included Yann Schrub, Benjamin Choquert, Pierre Kardous, Hassan Chahdi and Valentin Gondouin.

Anselmini competed at the 2024 European Athletics Championships in Rome in the men's 800 metres, where he qualified for the semi-final and ran a personal best of 1:44.73. In July 2024, he won ahead of Anas Chaoudar in the 1500 metres at the French Athletics U23 Championships in Albi.

In January 2025, he set a new indoor personal best for the 800 metres, running a time of 1:47.09 at the Meeting de Nantes Metropole, a World Athletics Indoor Tour Bronze event, in Nantes, France. Anselmini became French indoor champion in the 1500 metres at the 2025 French Indoor Athletics Championships in Miramas. At that venue in 2025, he set a French indoor U23 record time of 3:36.74 for the 1500 metres. He later lowered that mark to 3:36.72 racing in Lyon in February 2025. He was selected for the 2025 European Athletics Indoor Championships in Appeldoorn, where he qualified for the final of the 1500 metres, placing eighth overall.

Anselmini ran a personal best 3:31.63 for the 1500 metres at the 2025 Meeting de Paris in June. He won the silver medal in the 1500 metres at the 2025 European Athletics U23 Championships in Bergen, Norway running a time of 3:45.35. In September 2025, he competed at the 2025 World Championships in Tokyo, Japan, without advancing to the semi-finals.

Competing on 28 June 2026 at the 2026 Meeting de Paris, he ran a new personal best 3:31.36 for the 1500 metres. On 26 July, he placed second in the 1500 metres French Athletics Championships in Albi. In August, he competed at the 2026 European Athletics Championships in Birmingham, England, in the 1500 metres.
