= Yanis Meziane =

French middle-distance runner

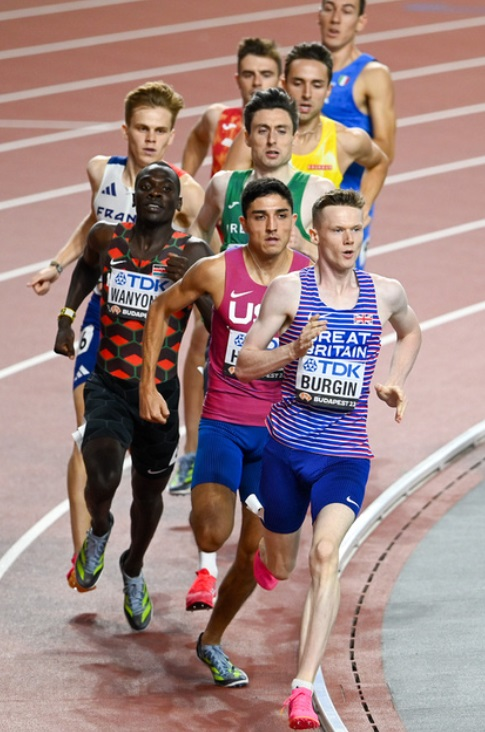
- Meziane in 2023

Personal information
- Nationality: French
- Born: 26 January 2002 (age 24) Nishihara, Japan
- Height: 1.86 m (6 ft 1 in)
- Weight: 72 kg (159 lb)

Sport
- Country: France
- Sport: Athletics
- Event: 800 metres
- Club: Athlé 91
- Coached by: Boris Le Helloco

Achievements and titles
- Personal best: 800m: 1:42.78 (Budapest 2026)
Medal record
Men's athletics
Representing France
Diamond League
Third place	2026	800 m
European U23 Championships
Gold medal – first place	2023 Espoo	800 metres
European U20 Championships
Bronze medal – third place	2021 Tallinn	800 metres

Yanis Meziane (born 26 January 2002) is a French middle-distance runner, who specializes in the 800 metres. He won the 800m at the 2023 European Athletics U23 Championships.

== Biography ==
Meziane was a bronze medalist in the 800m at the 2021 European Athletics U23 Championships in Tallinn, Estonia, in a time of 1:48.56. He was selected for the senior 2022 European Athletics Championships in Munich, Germany, but did not progress from the heats, running a time of 1:47.82.

He ran under 1:45 in the 800 metres for the first time, achieving a time of 1:44.78 in Paris in the Diamond League on June 9, 2023. Meziane won the 800m at the 2023 European Athletics U23 Championships in Espoo, Finland, in a time of 1:45.92, finishing just ahead of Great Britain's Ethan Hussey and compatriot Paul Anselmini. He entered the Diamond League race in Monaco in July 2023, and ran a personal best time of 1:44.30. At the 2023 World Athletics Championships in Budapest, he qualified for the semi-finals of the 800m. In September 2023, he lowered his 800m personal best to 1:43.94 at the Diamond League event in Brussels. Later that month he equaled that best to finish fourth at the Diamond League final in Eugene, Oregon.

He finished third in the 800 metres at the 2024 Diamond League event 2024 Meeting International Mohammed VI d'Athlétisme in Rabat.

In January 2025, he won the 800 metres, running a time of 1:46.28 at the Meeting de Nantes Metropole, a World Athletics Indoor Tour Bronze event, in Nantes, France. He was selected for the 2025 European Athletics Indoor Championships in Appeldoorn, Netherlands, but did not reach the semi-finals. He was subsequently selected for the 2025 World Athletics Indoor Championships in Nanjing, China, in March 2025, where he qualified for the semi-finals but did not progress into the final.

He was also a semi-finalist at the 2025 World Athletics Championships in Tokyo, Japan, in September 2025 in the men's 800 metres.

In May 2026, he placed fifth in the 1500 m at the 2026 Shanghai Diamond League, and placed seventh over 800 metres on 28 June at the 2026 Meeting de Paris. On 25 July 2026, he placed third in the 800 metres at the 2026 French Championships. In August, he competed at the 2026 European Athletics Championships in Birmingham, England, in the 800 metres, reaching the semi-finals. At the 2026 Diamond League Final in Brussels on 4 September, Meziane ran a new 800 metres personal best with 1:42.87 for third place overall. Later that month, he ran a new personal best 1:42.78 over 800 m in the final at the inaugural World Ultimate Championship in Budapest.
