= Sam Whitmarsh =

American middle-distance runner

Personal information
- Born: October 18, 2002 (age 23)

Sport
- Sport: Athletics
- Event: Middle-distance running

Achievements and titles
- Personal bests: 800m: 1:44.46 (LSU- Battle at the Bayou, 2025)

Sam Whitmarsh (born October 18, 2002) is an American middle-distance runner. He won the 2025 NCAA Outdoor Championships over 800 metres.

== Early life ==
From Lake Jackson, Texas, he attended Brazoswood High School in Texas, graduating in 2021 and left with the Brazoswood record for both the 800 metres and 400 metres. He was a keen basketball player in his youth, alongside athletics.

== Career ==
Competing for Texas A&M University, he was SEC Champion over 800 metres in 2024, both indoors and outdoors, and was runner-up at the 2024 NCAA Division I Outdoor Track and Field Championships. In June 2024, he signed a Name, Image and Likeness (NIL) contract with Brooks Running.

Whitmarsh ran 1:44.46 for the 800 metres at the Battle on the Bayou meet on 30 March 2025, a performance which moved him into seventh place on the all-time collegiate list. In June 2025, he also won the 2025 NCAA Outdoor Championships 800 metres title, in his final race at the collegiate level, leading from the front with 200 metres to go. His effort helped the Texas Aggies to a share of the overall team title.

In August 2025, Whitmarsh announced via an Instagram post that he has signed a contract with Brooks to be a part of the Brooks Beasts Training Group.

== Personal life ==
In 2022, Whitmarsh was diagnosed with the heart condition Wolff–Parkinson–White syndrome.
