= Ethan Hussey =

British middle-distance runner (born 2003)

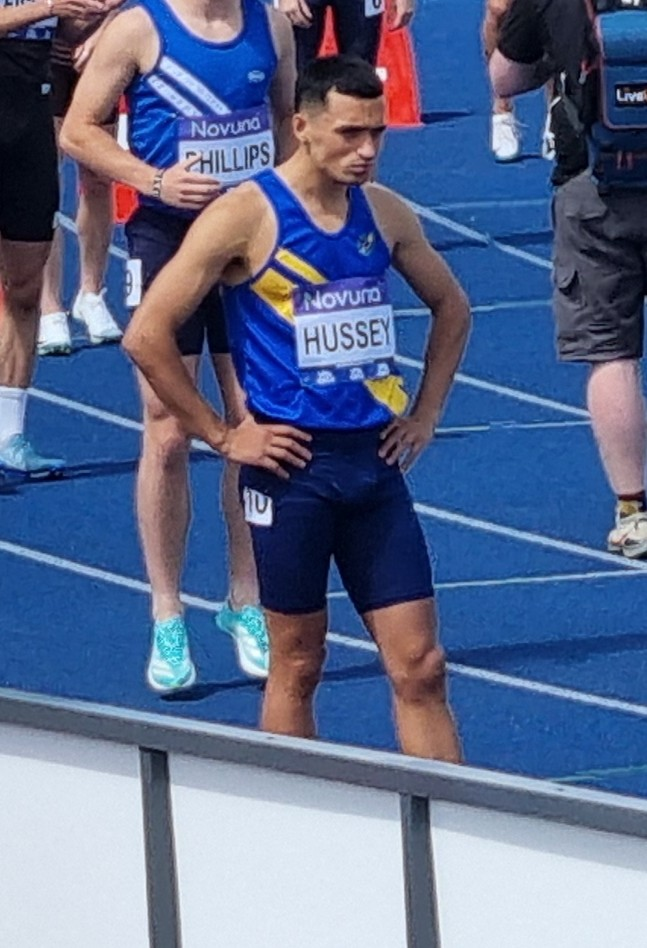
- 2025 UK Athletics Championships

Personal information
- Nationality: Great Britain
- Born: 5 March 2003 (23 years, 257 days old)
- Education: Leeds Beckett University
- Height: 170 cm (5 ft 7 in)
- Weight: 59 kg (130 lb)

Sport
- Sport: Athletics
- Events: 800 metres 1500 metres
- Coached by: Andy Henderson

Achievements and titles
- National finals: 2018 British U18s; • 3000m, 1st (gold); 2021 British U20s; • 1500m, 3rd (bronze); 2023 British Champs; • 800m, 4th
- Personal bests: 800m: 1:44.96 (2021) 1500m: 3:39.60 (2022)
Medal record
Men's athletics
Representing United Kingdom
World U20 Championships
Bronze medal – third place	2022 Cali	800 m
European U23 Championships
Silver medal – second place	2023 Espoo	800 m
- Updated on 4 April 2024

Ethan Hussey (born 5 March 2003) is an English middle-distance runner specializing in the 800 metres. He won a bronze medal at the 2022 World Athletics U20 Championships in the 800 m.

== Career ==
Hussey first represented the United Kingdom at the 2022 World Athletics U20 Championships, where he won a bronze medal in the 800 m. This earned him the Athletics Weekly British male under-20 athlete of the year award for 2022.

The following year, Hussey won a silver medal at the 2023 European Athletics U23 Championships in the 800 m, finishing narrowly behind Frenchman Yanis Meziane. He missed the 2023 British Worlds team by just half a second, finishing fourth at the British trials.

== Personal life ==
Hussey grew up playing rugby football, but after a leg injury he switched to athletics. He studies sport and business management at Leeds Beckett University, where he is coached by Andy Henderson. He was inspired by fellow 800 m runner Ben Pattison.

== Statistics ==
=== Personal best progression ===
800m progression
#	Mark	Pl.	Competition	Venue	Date	Ref.
1	1:52.44	(gold) (Round C)	BMC Gold Standard Races	Stretford, Great Britain	11 Jun 2018	
2	1:50.72	1st place, gold medalist(s)	BMC Gold Standard Races	Stretford, Great Britain	13 May 2019	
3	1:49.78	2nd place, silver medalist(s)	BMC Gold Standard Races	Stretford, Great Britain	22 Jul 2019	
4	1:46.78	5th	BMC Grand Prix	Manchester, Great Britain	28 May 2021	
5	1:46.61	1st place, gold medalist(s)	BMC Gold Standard Races	Stretford, Great Britain	22 Aug 2022	
6	1:46.18	1st place, gold medalist(s)	Irish Milers Club Meet	Belfast, Great Britain	12 May 2023	
7	1:45.71	2nd place, silver medalist(s)	Internationales Pfingstsportfest Rehlingen	Rehlingen, Germany	27 May 2023	
8	1:45.08	(gold) (Round B)	Merck-Laufgala Pfungstadt	Pfungstadt, Germany	20 Jun 2023	
9	1:44.96	6th	London Athletics Meet	London, Great Britain	22 Jul 2023	
