= 2024 African Championships in Athletics – Men's 800 metres =

Men's 800 metres at the 2024 African Championships in Athletics
- Venue: Japoma Stadium
- Location: Douala, Cameroon
- Dates: 22 June (heats); 23 June (final)
- Competitors: 24 from 20 nations
- Winning time: 1:45.02

Medalists
gold medal	Alex Kipngetich	Kenya
silver medal	Kethobogile Haingura	Botswana
bronze medal	Tom Dradiga	Uganda

The men's 800 metres event at the 2024 African Championships in Athletics was held on 22 and 23 June in Douala, Cameroon.

== Records ==
Records before the 2024 African Athletics Championships
Record	Athlete (nation)	Time (s)	Location	Date
World record	David Rudisha (KEN)	1:40.91	London, United Kingdom	9 August 2012
African record	David Rudisha (KEN)	1:40.91	London, United Kingdom	9 August 2012
Championship record	David Rudisha (KEN)	1:42.84	Nairobi, Kenya	30 July 2010
World leading	Emmanuel Wanyonyi (KEN)	1:41.70	Nairobi, Kenya	15 June 2024
African leading	Emmanuel Wanyonyi (KEN)	1:41.70	Nairobi, Kenya	15 June 2024

== Results ==
=== Heats ===
Qualification: First 2 of each heat (Q) and the next 2 fastest (q) qualified for the final.

Rank	Heat	Name	Nationality	Time	Notes
1	2	Alex Kipngetich	Kenya	1:45.59	Q
2	2	Idow Hassan Ali	Somalia	1:46.40	Q
3	2	Tumo Nkape	Botswana	1:46.68	q
4	1	Kethobogile Haingura	Botswana	1:46.86	Q
5	2	Éric Nzikwinkunda	Burundi	1:46.97	q
6	1	Edose Ibadin	Nigeria	1:47.65	Q
7	1	Nicholas Kebenei	Kenya	1:48.07	
8	1	Dawid Dam	Namibia	1:48.40	
9	3	Tom Dradiga	Uganda	1:48.81	Q
10	1	Makman Yoagbati	Togo	1:48.99	NR
11	3	Yohannes Tefera	Ethiopia	1:49.00	Q
12	2	Hazem Miawad	Egypt	1:49.05	
13	2	Francky Mbotto	Central African Republic	1:49.09	
14	3	Abdellah Mouzlib	Morocco	1:49.13	
15	2	Mohamed Idriss Hassan	Djibouti	1:49.87	
16	3	Abdessalem Ayouni	Tunisia	1:50.61	
17	1	Samuel Buche	Ethiopia	1:50.73	
18	3	Samuel Dari	Chad	1:53.20	
19	3	Alaa Al-Gorni	Libya	1:53.63	
20	1	Kabelo Mohlosi	South Africa	1:54.93	
21	1	Medard Behodjingar	Chad	1:56.48	
22	1	Aboubakar Soudi	Cameroon	1:56.48	
23	3	Sylvain Azonhin	Benin	1:57.21	
24	2	Esmael Freitas	São Tomé and Príncipe	1:57.64	
	2	Killian Daude	Reunion	DNS	
	3	Patrice Remandro	Madagascar	DNS	
	3	Fabrice Iradukunda	Burundi	DNS	

=== Final ===
Rank	Athlete	Nationality	Time	Notes
1st place, gold medalist(s)	Alex Kipngetich	Kenya	1:45.02	
2nd place, silver medalist(s)	Kethobogile Haingura	Botswana	1:45.54	
3rd place, bronze medalist(s)	Tom Dradiga	Uganda	1:46.01	
4	Tumo Nkape	Botswana	1:46.69	
5	Éric Nzikwinkunda	Burundi	1:47.09	
6	Edose Ibadin	Nigeria	1:47.95	
7	Idow Hassan Ali	Somalia	1:48.37	
8	Yohannes Tefera	Ethiopia	2:01.76	

== See also ==
- Athletics at the 2023 African Games – Men's 800 metres
