= Athletics at the 2023 African Games – Men's 800 metres =

Men's 800 metres at the 2023 African Games
- Venue: Legon Sports Stadium
- Location: Accra, Ghana
- Dates: 18 March (heats); 19 March (semi-finals); 20 March (final)
- Competitors: 26 from 21 nations
- Winning time: 1:45.72

Medalists
gold medal	Aaron Cheminingwa	Kenya
silver medal	Ngeno Kipngetich	Kenya
bronze medal	Tumo Nkape	Botswana

The men's 800 metres event at the 2023 African Games was held on 18, 19 and 20 March 2024 in Accra, Ghana.

== Results ==
=== Heats ===
Qualification: First 3 in each heat (Q) and the next 4 fastest (q) advanced to the semifinals.

Rank	Heat	Name	Nationality	Time	Notes
1	2	Fithawi Zaid	Eritrea	1:45.90	Q, NR
2	2	Aaron Cheminingwa	Kenya	1:46.69	Q
3	4	Ngeno Kipngetich	Kenya	1:46.84	Q
4	3	Samuel Buche	Ethiopia	1:46.95	Q
5	4	Alex Amankwah	Ghana	1:47.12	Q
6	3	Tumo Nkape	Botswana	1:47.19	Q
7	3	Éric Nzikwinkunda	Burundi	1:47.33	Q
8	3	Dawid Dam	Namibia	1:47.42	q
9	4	Tom Dradiga	Uganda	1:47.55	Q
10	4	Ahmed Sayf Kadri	Tunisia	1:48.97	q
11	2	Hazem Miawad	Egypt	1:49.60	Q
12	4	Waberie Igueh Houssein	Djibouti	1:49.69	q
13	2	Yohannes Tefera	Ethiopia	1:51.19	q
14	4	Hamid Sambo	Nigeria	1:51.28	
15	1	Nabil Oussama	Morocco	1:51.64	Q
16	1	Riadh Chninni	Tunisia	1:51.79	Q
17	1	Sampierre Gomez	The Gambia	1:51.94	Q
18	1	Makman Yoagbati	Togo	1:52.85	
19	1	Birhanu Garumsa	Ethiopia	1:53.63	
20	1	Arno Angula	Namibia	1:53.71	
21	1	Abraham Guot Thon	South Sudan	1:54.20	
22	3	Kelvin Chiku	Zimbabwe	1:55.36	
23	4	Patrick Kpamba Mandata	Central African Republic	1:55.84	
24	3	Hamidou Diarra	Mali	1:58.54	
25	2	Kalie Sesay	Sierra Leone	1:59.28	
26	3	Manuel Nzeng Nangal	Equatorial Guinea	2:07.22	
	2	Mohamed Abdalla Ismail	Sudan	DNS	

=== Semifinals ===
Qualification: First 3 in each semifinal (Q) and the next 2 fastest (q) advanced to the final.

Rank	Heat	Name	Nationality	Time	Notes
1	1	Ngeno Kipngetich	Kenya	1:46.40	Q
2	1	Aaron Cheminingwa	Kenya	1:46.53	Q
3	1	Tumo Nkape	Botswana	1:46.73	Q
4	1	Nabil Oussama	Morocco	1:47.04	q
5	1	Ahmed Sayf Kadri	Tunisia	1:47.52	q
6	1	Éric Nzikwinkunda	Burundi	1:47.56	
7	1	Hazem Miawad	Egypt	1:48.59	
8	2	Tom Dradiga	Uganda	1:48.89	Q
9	2	Alex Amankwah	Ghana	1:48.93	Q
10	2	Yohannes Tefera	Ethiopia	1:48.99	Q
11	2	Riadh Chninni	Tunisia	1:49.06	
12	2	Samuel Buche	Ethiopia	1:49.15	
13	1	Sampierre Gomez	The Gambia	1:49.19	
14	2	Fithawi Zaid	Eritrea	1:50.41	
15	2	Dawid Dam	Namibia	1:51.10	
16	2	Waberie Igueh Houssein	Djibouti	1:51.30	

=== Final ===
Rank	Name	Nationality	Time	Notes
1st place, gold medalist(s)	Aaron Cheminingwa	Kenya	1:45.72	
2nd place, silver medalist(s)	Ngeno Kipngetich	Kenya	1:45.73	
3rd place, bronze medalist(s)	Tumo Nkape	Botswana	1:46.04	
4	Tom Dradiga	Uganda	1:46.14	
5	Alex Amankwah	Ghana	1:46.53	
6	Yohannes Tefera	Ethiopia	1:46.74	
7	Nabil Oussama	Morocco	1:46.77	
8	Ahmed Sayf Kadri	Tunisia	1:47.40	
