= 2025 World Athletics Indoor Championships – Men's 800 metres =

Men's 800 metres at the 2025 World Athletics Indoor Championships
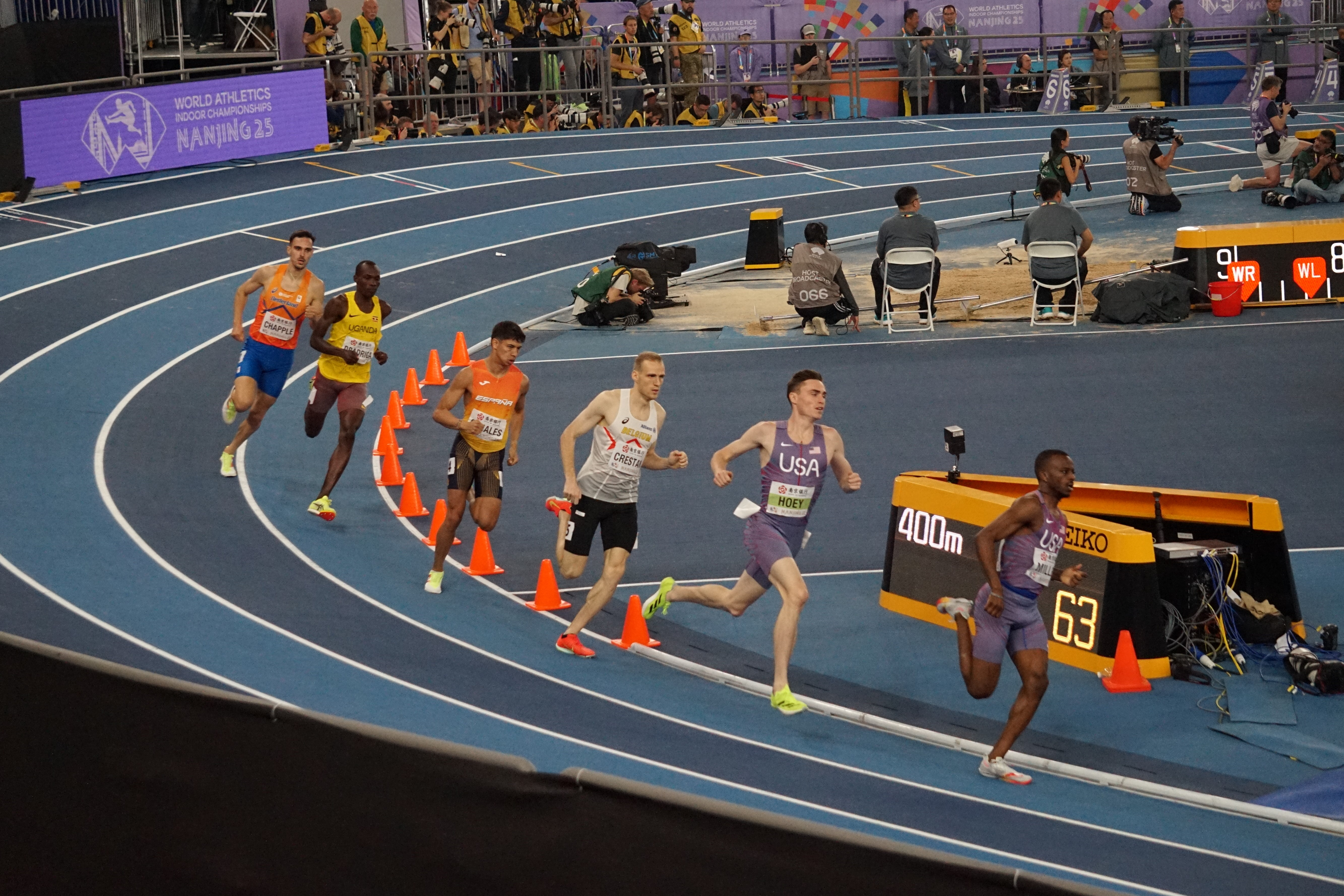
- The final underway
- Venue: Nanjing's Cube at Nanjing Youth Olympic Sports Park
- Location: Nanjing, China
- Dates: 21 March (heats); 22 March (semi-finals); 23 March (final)
- Winning time: 1:44.77

Medalists
gold medal	Josh Hoey	United States
silver medal	Eliott Crestan	Belgium
bronze medal	Josué Canales	Spain

The men's 800 metres at the 2025 World Athletics Indoor Championships took place on the short track of the Nanjing's Cube at Nanjing Youth Olympic Sports Park in Nanjing, China, on 21, 22 and 23 March 2025. It was the 21st time the event was contested at the World Athletics Indoor Championships. Athletes qualified by achieving the entry standard or by their World Athletics Ranking in the event.

The heats took place on 21 March during the morning session. The semi-finals took place on 22 March during the morning session. The final occurred on 23 March during the evening session.

== Background ==
The men's 800 metres was contested 20 times before 2025, at every previous edition of the World Athletics Indoor Championships.

Records before the 2025 World Athletics Indoor Championships
Record	Athlete (nation)	Time (s)	Location	Date
World record	Wilson Kipketer (DEN)	1:42.67	Paris, France	9 March 1997
Championship record	Wilson Kipketer (DEN)	1:42.67	Paris, France	9 March 1997
World leading	Josh Hoey (USA)	1:43.24	New York, United States	23 February 2025

== Qualification ==
For the men's 800 metres, the qualification period ran from 1 September 2024 until 9 March 2025. Athletes qualified by achieving the entry standards of 1:45.00. Athletes were also able to qualify by virtue of their World Athletics Ranking for the event, or by virtue of their World Athletics Indoor Tour wildcard. There was a target number of 30 athletes.

== Results ==
=== Heats ===
The heats took place on 21 March, starting at 11:55 (UTC+8) in the morning. First 3 of each heat (Q) plus 3 fastest times (q) qualified for the semi-finals.

==== Heat 1 ====
Place	Athlete	Nation	Time	Notes
1	Yanis Meziane	France	1:46.07	Q
2	Brandon Miller	United States	1:46.47	Q
3	John Rivera	Puerto Rico	1:46.84	Q
4	Ebrahim Al-Zofairi	Kuwait	1:47.20	q, SB
5	Xi Xiaoheng	China	1:47.24	q
6	Robert Heppenstall	Canada	1:48.06	q, PB

==== Heat 2 ====
Place	Athlete	Nation	Time	Notes
1	Tom Dradiga	Uganda	1:49.09	Q
2	Heithem Chenitef	Algeria	1:49.16	Q
3	Josué Canales	Spain	1:49.44	Q
4	Abdelati El Guesse	Morocco	1:49.83	
5	Collins Kipruto	Kenya	1:50.08	

==== Heat 3 ====
Place	Athlete	Nation	Time	Notes
1	Eliott Crestan	Belgium	1:48.94	Q
2	Álvaro de Arriba	Spain	1:49.16	Q
3	Samuel Chapple	Netherlands	1:49.30	Q
4	Daniel Kotyza	Czech Republic	1:49.76 [.755]	
5	Hazem Miawad	Egypt	1:49.76 [.758]	

==== Heat 4 ====
Place	Athlete	Nation	Time	Notes
1	Josh Hoey	United States	1:48.14	Q
2	Noah Kibet	Kenya	1:48.31	Q
3	Giovanni Lazzaro	Italy	1:48.75	Q
4	Yukichi Ishii	Japan	1:48.85	
5	Ryan Clarke	Netherlands	1:52.97	

==== Heat 5 ====
Place	Athlete	Nation	Time	Notes
1	Jakub Dudycha	Czech Republic	1:48.04	Q
2	Ngeno Kipngetich	Kenya	1:48.17	Q
3	Patryk Sieradzki	Poland	1:48.20	Q
4	Mouad Zahafi	Morocco	1:48.38	
—	Guilherme Orenhas	Brazil	DNF	

=== Semi-finals ===
The semi-finals took place on 22 March, starting at 12:31 (UTC+8) in the morning. The first 2 of each heat (Q) qualified for the final.

==== Heat 1 ====
Place	Athlete	Nation	Time	Notes
1	Josh Hoey	United States	1:45.23	Q
2	Tom Dradiga	Uganda	1:46.98	Q
3	Patryk Sieradzki	Poland	1:47.55	
4	Noah Kibet	Kenya	1:48.90	
5	Xi Xiaoheng	China	1:49.59	
6	Yanis Meziane	France	2:23.96	

==== Heat 2 ====
Place	Athlete	Nation	Time	Notes
1	Eliott Crestan	Belgium	1:48.65	Q
2	Josué Canales	Spain	1:48.70	Q
3	Ebrahim Al-Zofairi	Kuwait	1:49.37	
4	John Rivera	Puerto Rico	1:49.49 [.481]	
5	Jakub Dudycha	Czech Republic	1:49.49 [.483]	
6	Robert Heppenstall	Canada	1:49.54	

==== Heat 3 ====
Place	Athlete	Nation	Time	Notes
1	Brandon Miller	United States	1:46.84	Q
2	Samuel Chapple	Netherlands	1:47.05	Q
3	Heithem Chenitef	Algeria	1:47.30	PB
4	Ngeno Kipngetich	Kenya	1:47.53	
5	Álvaro de Arriba	Spain	1:47.58	
6	Giovanni Lazzaro	Italy	1:48.06	

=== Final ===
The final took place on 23 March, starting at 20:40 (UTC+8).

Place	Athlete	Nation	Time	Notes
1st place, gold medalist(s)	Josh Hoey	United States	1:44.77	
2nd place, silver medalist(s)	Eliott Crestan	Belgium	1:44.81	
3rd place, bronze medalist(s)	Josué Canales	Spain	1:45.03	
4	Samuel Chapple	Netherlands	1:45.55	
5	Brandon Miller	United States	1:46.44	
6	Tom Dradiga	Uganda	1:50.19	
