= Kethobogile Haingura =

Botswanan athlete (born 1998

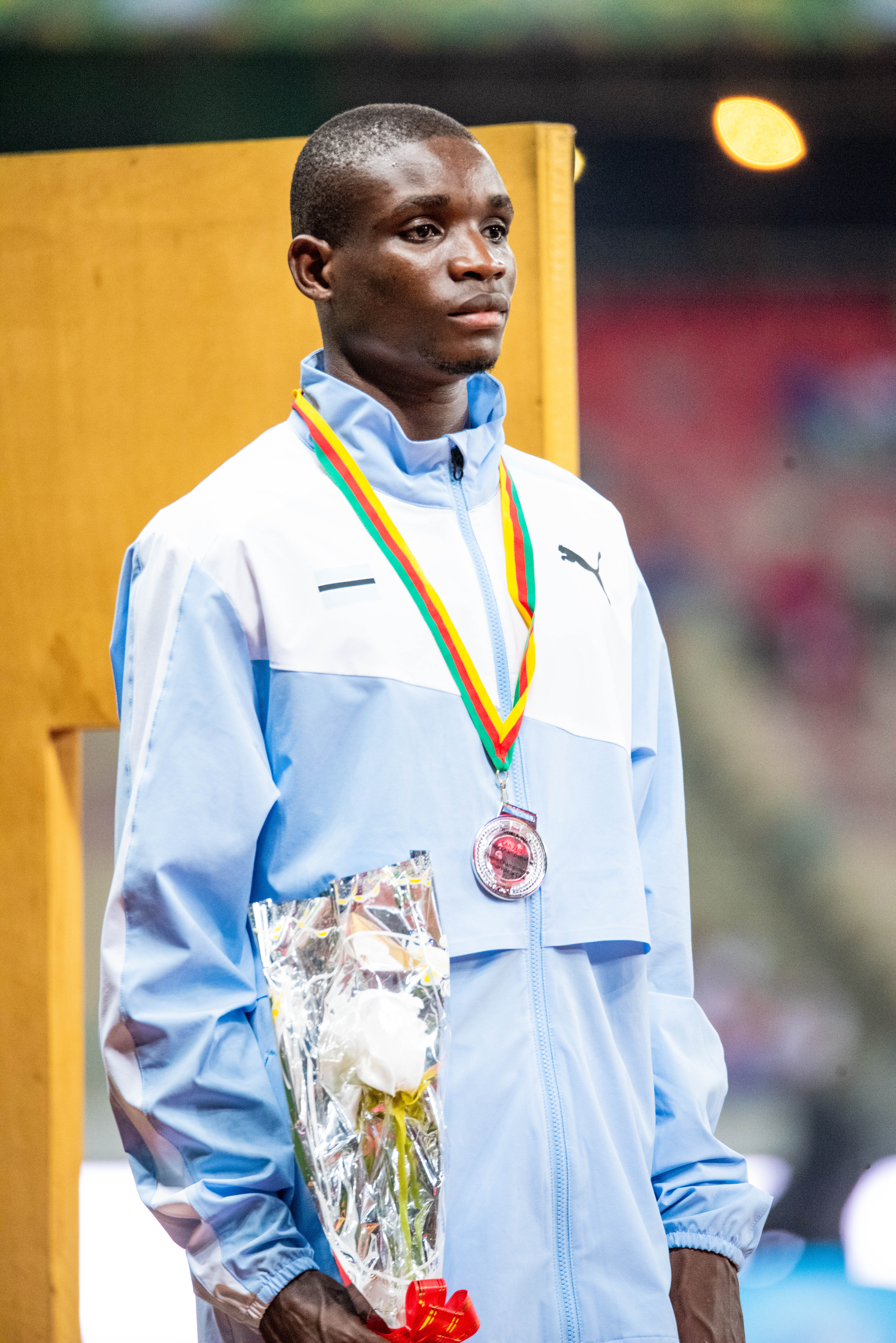
- Haingura in 2024

Personal information
- Nationality: Botswana
- Born: 14 December 1998 (age 27)

Sport
- Sport: Athletics
- Event: Middle distance running

Achievements and titles
- Personal bests: 800m: 1:43.88 (Johannesburg, 2025); 1500m: 3:48.79 (Gaborone, 2024)
Medal record
Men's athletics
Representing Botswana
African Championships
Silver medal – second place	2024 Douala	800 m

Kethobogile Haingura (born 14 December 1998) is a Botswana middle-distance runner. In 2024, he became national champion over 1500 metres.

== Biography ==
A member of Maun Track and Field Club, he finished in second place at the Botswana National championships in 2022 over 800 metres in Francistown. In March 2023, he finished third over 800 metres at the Botswanan Golden Grand Prix. In May 2023, he was runner-up over 800 metres and 1500 metres at the Botswana national championships in Gaborone.

He lowered his personal best over 800 metres to 1:45.53 in Tshwane in March 2024. He won the 800m at the Athletics South Africa grand prix meet in Pretoria in March 2024 with a time of 1:43.94 The time met the 2024 Paris Olympics qualifying standard, and was the fastest 800m ever run in South Africa.

In May 2024, he won the Botswana National Championships over 1500 metres in Gabarone. In June 2024, he won silver in the 800 metres at the African Championships in Douala, Cameroon. He competed in the 800 metres at the 2024 Summer Olympics in Paris in August 2024.

In March 2025, he set a new personal best time of 1:43.88 in Johannesburg. On 12 April 2025 in Gaborone, Haingura clocked 1:44.18 to win on the World Athletics Continental tour ahead of compatriot Tshepiso Masalela. He finished fifth in the 800 metres at the 2025 Meeting International Mohammed VI d'Athlétisme de Rabat, part of the 2025 Diamond League, in May 2025. He was a semi-finalist at the 2025 World Athletics Championships in Tokyo, Japan, in September 2025 in the men's 800 metres.

In May 2026, Haingura was second in 1:43.89 at the 2026 Shanghai Diamond League, caught on the line by Irishman Mark English after prematurely celebrating the victory. He was a semi-finalist in the 800 metres at the 2026 Commonwealth Games in Glasgow, Scotland.

== Statistics ==
Grand Slam Track results
Slam	Race group	Event	Pl.	Time	Prize money
2025 Miami Slam	Short distance	1500 m	4th	3:35.21	US$30,000
2025 Miami Slam	Short distance	800 m	2nd	1:43.75	US$30,000
