= Aaron Cheminingwa =

Kenyan athlete (born 1998)

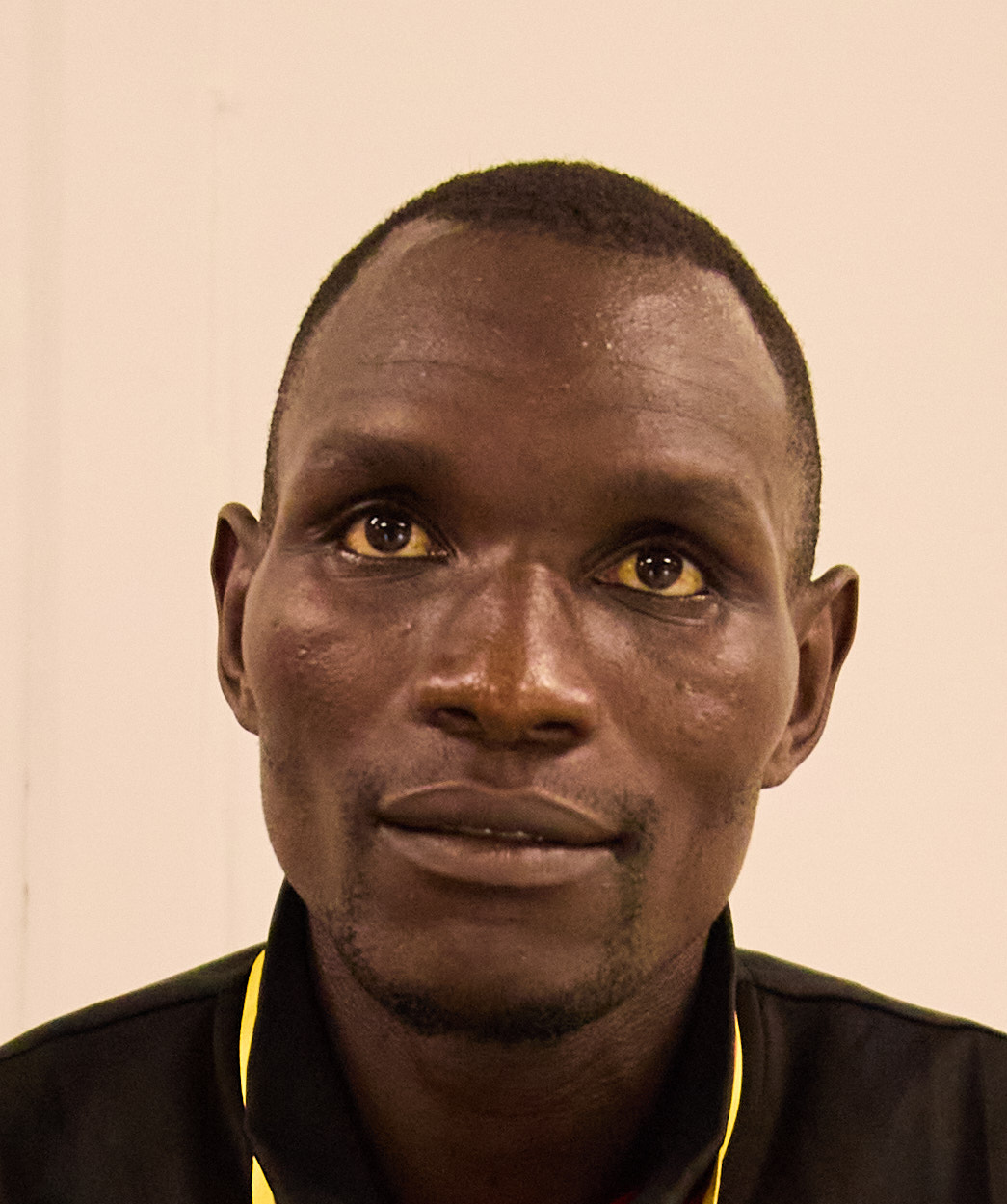
- Cheminingwa in 2024

Personal information
- Nationality: Kenya
- Born: Aaron Kemei Cheminingwa; 21 June 1998 (age 28)

Sport
- Sport: Athletics

Achievements and titles
- Personal bests: 400m: 48.14 (Nairobi, 2023); 800m: 1:42.08 (Paris, 2024)
Medal record
Representing Kenya
2023 African Games
Gold medal – first place	2023 Accra	800 m

Aaron Kemei Cheminingwa (born 21 June 1998) is a Kenyan middle-distance runner. He won the gold medal at the 2023 African Games in the 800 metres.

== Career ==
In the 2020s, he began to be coached by Alex Sang, whose other athletes include Kenyan 800 metres world champion Mary Moraa. He ran a 800 metres personal best time of 1:44.24 at the National Stadium, Nairobi on 6 March 2024. Cheminingwa then won gold in the 800 metres at the 2023 African Games in Accra, Ghana on 20 March 2024. It was his debut run in a Kenyan vest, and he became the first Kenyan to win that distance at the games since Japheth Kimutai in 1999.

On 20 April 2024, he finished as runner-up in the 800 metres at the Kip Keino Classic in Kenya, only finishing behind a world-leading run by Emmanuel Wanyonyi. In doing so, Cheminingwa lowered his personal best to 1:44:10. He ran a personal best time of 1:43.55 on 23 May 2024, in Asti, Italy. He lowered his personal best again at the 2024 Meeting de Paris in July 2024, running 1:42.08. On 12 July 2024, he ran 1:42.22 at the 2024 Herculis Diamond League event in Monaco.

He finished eighth over 800 metres in May 2025 at the 2025 Doha Diamond League.
