= Josh Hoey =

American track and field athlete (born 1999)

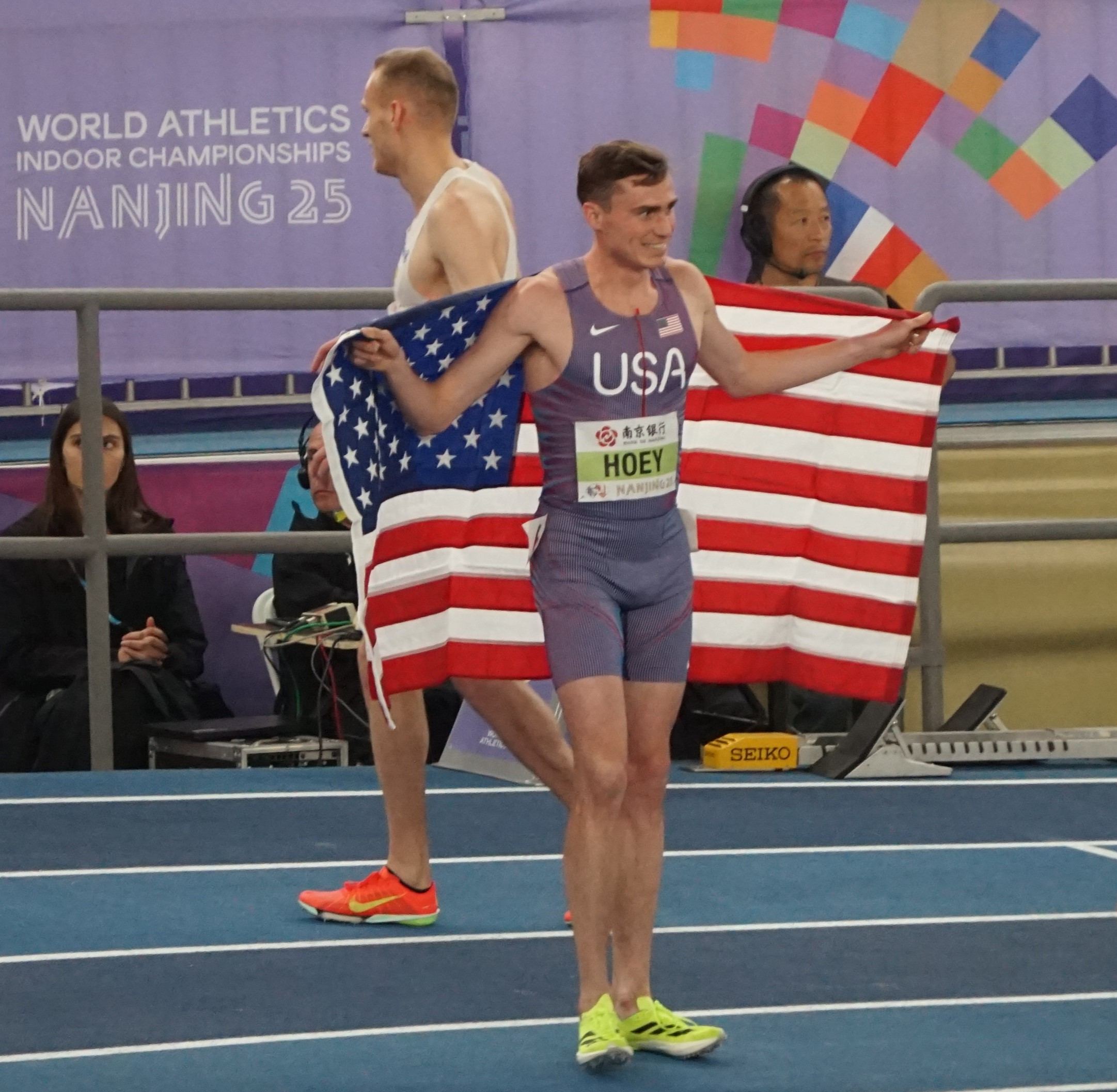
- Hoey at the 2025 World Indoor Championships

Personal information
- Nationality: United States
- Born: November 1, 1999 (age 27)
- Education: Bishop Shanahan High School

Sport
- Sport: Track and field
- Events: 600 meters, 800 meters, 1000 meters, mile
- Club: Adidas
- Coached by: Terrence Mahon (2013-2019); Lee Labadie (2019-2020); Matt Centrowitz (2021-2022); Tom Nohilly (2022-2023; Rana Reider (2023-2024); Justin Rinaldi (2024-2025) self-coached (2025-)

Achievements and titles
- National finals: 2025 Eugene; 800 m, 4th; 2024 Eugene; 800 m, 4th
- Personal bests: All information from athlete's World Athletics profile.: Outdoors; 800 m: 1:42.01 (Monaco 2025); 1500 m: 3:29.75 (Ostrava 2025); Indoors; 600 m: 1:12.84 WB (Boston 2025); 800 m: 1:42.50 WR (Boston 2026); 1000 m: 2:14.48 AR NR (Philadelphia 2025); 1500 m: 3:33.66 (Boston 2025); Mile: 3:52.61 (Boston 2024)
Medal record
Men's athletics
Representing the United States
World Indoor Championships
Gold medal – first place	2025 Nanjing	800 m

Josh Hoey (born November 1, 1999) is an American middle-distance runner who is the world record holder in the short track 800 meters, with a time of 1:42.50 set in 2026. He won a gold medal in the event at the 2025 World Indoor Championships. Hoey also holds the world best in the short track 600 meters and the American record in the short track 1000 meters, with times of 1:12.84 and 2:14.48 respectively.

== Career ==
=== 2018–2024 ===
Hoey attended Bishop Shanahan High School in Downingtown, Pennsylvania. As a senior, he set the U.S. high school national record in the indoor 800 meters, with a time of 1:47.67 (since broken by Cooper Lutkenhaus in 2025). He competed at the 2018 IAAF World U20 Championships in Tampere, Finland, running 1:48.07 in the semifinals of the 800 meters.

In 2018, originally intending to compete for the University of Oregon, Hoey turned pro after high school, signing with Adidas. He is one of three U.S. men's distance runners to turn pro immediately after high school, alongside Drew Hunter in 2016 and Hobbs Kessler in 2021. From 2018 to 2023, Hoey struggled to improve and cycled through five coaches, including Terrence Mahon (who had coached Hoey remotely since seventh grade), Matthew Centrowitz Sr., and Rana Reider, before finding success with Justin Rinaldi.

At the 2024 U.S. Olympic Trials, Hoey finished fourth in the 800 meter final, with a personal best time of 1:44.12. A few weeks later at the Moore-Guldensporen Meeting in Belgium, Hoey improved his 800 meter personal best to 1:43.80. In September 2024, he competed in the Fifth Avenue Mile, finishing second to Josh Kerr in 3:48.9. In December 2024 at Boston University, Hoey ran a personal best of 3:52.61 in the indoor mile.

=== 2025: World 800 meter indoor champion ===
On January 18, at the Quaker Invitational at the University of Pennsylvania, Hoey set a new American record in the short track 1000 meters, with a time of 2:14.48. This broke Shane Streich's previous record of 2:16.16 by almost two seconds. Hoey's time is the second fastest in indoor history, behind Ayanleh Souleiman's world record of 2:14.20.

On February 2, Hoey won the 1500 meters at the New Balance Grand Prix, in a new personal best of 3:33.66, beating Olympians Grant Fisher and Olli Hoare. On February 8, Hoey won the 800 meters over Bryce Hoppel at the Millrose Games, winning in a new American record of 1:43.90, whilst Hoppel finished second in 1:44.19.

On February 23, Hoey won a national title in the 800 meters at the 2025 USATF Indoor Track and Field Championships in New York City. He improved his area record and national record to 1:43.24, splitting 50.36 for the first 400 meters and 52.89 for the second 400 meters. This time placed Hoey as the second fastest athlete of all time at the time in the indoor 800 meters, with only Wilson Kipketer, who held the world record of 1:42.67, having run faster.

On March 23, Hoey won a world title in the 800 meters at the 2025 World Athletics Indoor Championships in Nanjing, China. Hoey was nearly caught at the finish line by Elliot Crestan of Belgium, but managed to remain 0.04 seconds ahead of Crestan to win in 1:44.77.

On June 15, at the Stockholm Diamond League, Hoey set a new outdoor personal best in the 800 meters, with a time of 1:42.43. This time placed Hoey as the third fastest American over 800 meters, behind Donavan Brazier (1:42.34) and Bryce Hoppel (1:41.67). On July 11, he improved his personal best to 1:42.01 at Herculis.

At the 2025 United States Outdoor Track and Field Championships, Hoey finished fourth to Bryce Hoppel, Cooper Lutkenhaus, and Donavan Brazier in the 800 meters, after opening in a 49.29 second first lap. On August 20, in rainy conditions, Hoey won the 800 meters at the Lausanne Diamond League, in a time of 1:42.82. It was the first 800 meter win by an American man on the Diamond League circuit since Isaiah Harris' win at the London Diamond League in 2021.

In October, it was announced that Hoey had parted ways with his coach Justin Rinaldi.

On December 6, at the 2025 BU Opener meeting, Hoey broke Donavan Brazier's short track 600 meter world best of 1:13.77, clocking 1:12.84. This time falls 0.03 seconds short of the outdoor 600 meter world best of 1:12.81, set by Johnny Gray.

=== 2026: Short track 800 meter world record ===
On January 24, at the New Balance Indoor Grand Prix, Hoey broke Wilson Kipketer's nearly 29 year old world record of 1:42.67 in the short track 800 meters, clocking 1:42.50.

== Personal life ==
Hoey comes from a running family. During the COVID-19 pandemic, the Hoey family built a track on their family farm outside Philadelphia, Pennsylvania. Hoey often trains with his brothers Jonah and Jaxson. Hoey also lives with is wife Amaris. His father Fran is a financial advisor and former athlete that has invested in his sons' track careers.

== Achievements and titles ==
=== International competitions ===
Year	Competition	Venue	Position	Event	Time	Ref
2025	World Indoor Championships	Nanjing Youth Olympic Sports Park, Nanjing, China	1st	800 m	1:44.77	

=== Circuit performances ===
==== Grand Slam Track ====
Grand Slam Track results
Slam	Race group	Event	Pl.	Time	Prize money
2025 Philadelphia Slam	Short distance	800 m	2nd	1:44.41	US$30,000
2025 Philadelphia Slam	Short distance	1500 m	5th	3:35.45	US$30,000

==== Diamond League wins ====
Year	Competition	Venue	Position	Event	Time	Ref
2025	Athletissima	Stade Olympique de la Pontaise, Lausanne, Switzerland	1st	800 m	1:42.82	

=== National championships ===
Year	Competition	Venue	Position	Event	Time	Ref
2024	Olympic Trials	Hayward Field, Eugene	4th	800 m	1:44.12	
2025	Indoor Track & Field Championships	Ocean Breeze, New York City	1st	800 m	1:43.24 NR	
2025	Outdoor Track & Field Championships	Hayward Field, Eugene	4th	800 m	1:43.06	
