= 2020 Central American Championships in Athletics =

XXXI Central American Championships in Athletics
- Dates: 28–29 December
- Host city: San José, Costa Rica
- Venue: Estadio Nacional
- Level: Senior
- Events: 41
- Participation: 10 nations

The 31st Central American Championships in Athletics were held at the Estadio Nacional in San José, Costa Rica, on 28 and 29 December 2020.

A total of 41 events were contested, 21 by men, 20 by women.

== Medal summary ==
=== Men ===
| Event | Gold | | Silver | | Bronze | |
|---|---|---|---|---|---|---|
| 100 metres | Emmanuel Niño; Costa Rica | 10.75 | Melique García; Honduras | 10.81 | Héctor Allen; Costa Rica | 10.86 |
| 200 metres | Jeikob Monge; Costa Rica | 21.58 | José Humberto Bermúdez; Guatemala | 21.59 | Alexander Salazar; Panama | 21.73 |
| 400 metres | José Humberto Bermúdez; Guatemala | 46.99 | Gerald Drummond; Costa Rica | 47.03 | Antonio Grant; Panama | 47.40 |
| 800 metres | Josué Canales; Honduras | 2:01.30 | Josué Murcia; Costa Rica | 2:02.27 | Chamar Chambers; Panama | 2:04.85 |
| 1500 metres | Josué Canales; Honduras | 4:05.46 | Pedro Chacón; Costa Rica | 4:07.51 | Amir Ramos; Belize | 5:01.52 |
| 5000 metres | Mario Pacay; Guatemala | 14:33.58 | Daniel Johanning; Costa Rica | 14:37.72 | Daniel González; Panama | 16:10.14 |
| 10,000 metres | Daniel Johanning; Costa Rica | 30:43.96 | Ariel Zuñiga; Panama | 34:29.39 | Only two starters | |
| 110 metres hurdles (wind: +0.4 m/s) | Wienstan Mena; Guatemala | 14.32 | Emmanuel Niño; Costa Rica | 14.51 | Only two starters | |
| 400 metres hurdles | Pablo Andrés Ibáñez; El Salvador | 50.58 | Gerald Drummond; Costa Rica | 51.19 | Only two starters | |
| 3000 metres steeplechase | Daniel González; Panama | 9:52.69 | Pedro Chacón; Costa Rica | 10:03.74 | Only two starters | |
| 4 × 100 metres relay | Honduras; Melique García; Yariel Matute; Gerom Solis; Kenneth Glenn | 40.55 | Costa Rica; Rasheed Miller; Emmanuel Niño; Jeikob Monge; Héctor Allen | 40.92 | Belize; Shaun Gill; Brandon Jones; Rahim Monsanto; Mark Anderson | 41.58 |
| 10,000 metres track walk | José Eduardo Ortiz; Guatemala | 43:00.82 CR | Yeudy Bonilla; Guatemala | 44:34.60 | Only two starters | |
| High jump^{†} | Byron Villalobos; Costa Rica | 1.88 | Only one starter | | | |
| Pole vault | Christiaan Higueros; Guatemala | 4.81 CR | Miguel Negrete; Honduras | 4.10 | Only two starters | |
| Long jump | Rasheed Miller; Costa Rica | 7.44 | Fredy Lemus; Guatemala | 7.33 | Kenneth Glenn; Honduras | 7.32 |
| Triple jump | Brandon Jones; Belize | 15.86 | Fredy Lemus; Guatemala | 15.68 | Rasheed Miller; Costa Rica | 14.81 |
| Shot put | Zack Short; Honduras | 18.08 CR | Anselmo Delgado; Panama | 15.12 | Elías Gómez; Costa Rica | 14.46 |
| Discus throw | Zack Short; Honduras | 51.52 CR | Elías Gómez; Costa Rica | 45.42 | Yoshua Villafuerte; Costa Rica | 43.25 |
| Hammer throw | Dylan Suárez; Costa Rica | 57.38 | Yoshua Villafuerte; Costa Rica | 37.05 | Only two starters | |
| Javelin throw | Luis Taracena; Guatemala | 69.65 | Iván Sibaja; Costa Rica | 63.43 | Armando Caballero; Panama | 56.24 |
| Decathlon | Estebán Ibáñez; El Salvador | 6179 | Brainer Chavarría; Costa Rica | 4655 | Only two starters | |

=== Women ===
| Event | Gold | | Silver | | Bronze | |
|---|---|---|---|---|---|---|
| 100 metres | Mariandreé Chacón; Guatemala | 12.18 | Keylin Pennant; Costa Rica | 12.30 | Hilary Gladden; Belize | 12.61 |
| 200 metres | Samantha Dirks; Belize | 24.72 | Mariandreé Chacón; Guatemala | 24.84 | Keylin Pennant; Costa Rica | 25.25 |
| 400 metres | Daniela Rojas; Costa Rica | 56.34 | Leyka Archibold; Panama | 60.20 | Kendy Rosales; Honduras | 62.18 |
| 800 metres | Mónica Vargas; Costa Rica | 2:21.21 | Chrisdyala Moraga; Costa Rica | 2:23.69 | Yaxury Guido; Nicaragua | 2:24.35 |
| 1500 metres^{†} | Mónica Vargas; Costa Rica | 5:04.20 | Only one starter | | | |
| 5000 metres | Viviana Aroche; Guatemala | 18:19.53 | Rosibel Salazar; Costa Rica | 18:24.97 | Andrea Calvo; Costa Rica | 18:41.24 |
| 10,000 metres | Viviana Aroche; Guatemala | 39:08.50 | Andrea Calvo; Costa Rica | 39:10.64 | Sandra Raxón; Guatemala | 40:50.24 |
| 100 metres hurdles (wind: -0.2 m/s) | Dennise Reyes; Honduras | 15.30 | Ashantie Carr; Belize | 22.99 | Only two starters | |
| 400 metres hurdles | Daniela Rojas; Costa Rica | 60.02 | Ashontie Carr; Belize | 69.35 | Only two participants | |
| 3000 metres steeplechase^{†} | Chrisdyala Moraga; Costa Rica | 11:46.07 | Only one participant | | | |
| 4 × 100 metres relay | Costa Rica; Melanie Foulkes; Abigail Obando; Daniela Rojas; Keylin Pennant | 48.22 | Belize; Hilary Gladden; Tricia Flores; Ashantie Carr; Samantha Dirks | 48.36 | Only two teams | |
| 10,000 metres track walk^{†} | Noelia Vargas; Costa Rica | 45:49.19 | Only one participant | | | |
| High jump | Abigail Obando; Costa Rica | 1.70 | Ángela González; Panama | 1.60 | Valeria Fernández; Guatemala | 1.40 |
| Pole vault^{†} | Rebeca Jara; Costa Rica | 2.70 | Only one participant | | | |
| Long jump | Nathalee Aranda; Panama | 6.25 | Thelma Fuentes; Guatemala | 5.99 | Tricia Flores; El Salvador | 5.74 |
| Triple jump | Thelma Fuentes; Guatemala | 13.56w | Valeria Fernández; Guatemala | 11.87 | Ashantie Carr; Belize | 11.86 |
| Shot put | Deisheline Mayers; Costa Rica | 12.06 | Gabrielle Figueroa; Honduras | 10.60 | Only two starters | |
| Hammer throw | Gabrielle Figueroa; Honduras | 56.59 | Daniela Cortes; Costa Rica | 46.54 | Only two starters | |
| Javelin throw^{†} | Genova Arias; Costa Rica | 42.94 | Deisheline Mayers; Costa Rica | 33.63 | Only two starters | |
| Heptathlon | Mariel Brokke; Costa Rica | 4163 | Dennise Reyes; Honduras | 3923 | Only two participants | |

† Exhibition

== Medal table ==
* Host nation (Costa Rica)

| Rank | Nation | Gold | Silver | Bronze | Total |
|---|---|---|---|---|---|
| 1 | Costa Rica (CRC)* | 11 | 16 | 3 | 30 |
| 2 | Guatemala (GUA) | 10 | 5 | 1 | 16 |
| 3 | Honduras | 7 | 4 | 2 | 13 |
| 4 | Panama (PAN) | 2 | 4 | 6 | 12 |
| 5 | Belize (BIZ) | 2 | 4 | 5 | 11 |
| 6 | El Salvador (ESA) | 2 | 0 | 0 | 2 |
| 7 | Nicaragua (NIC) | 0 | 1 | 0 | 1 |
| Totals (7 entries) | | 34 | 34 | 17 | 85 |
