= Ngeno Kipngetich =

Kenyan middle-distance runner (born 2000)

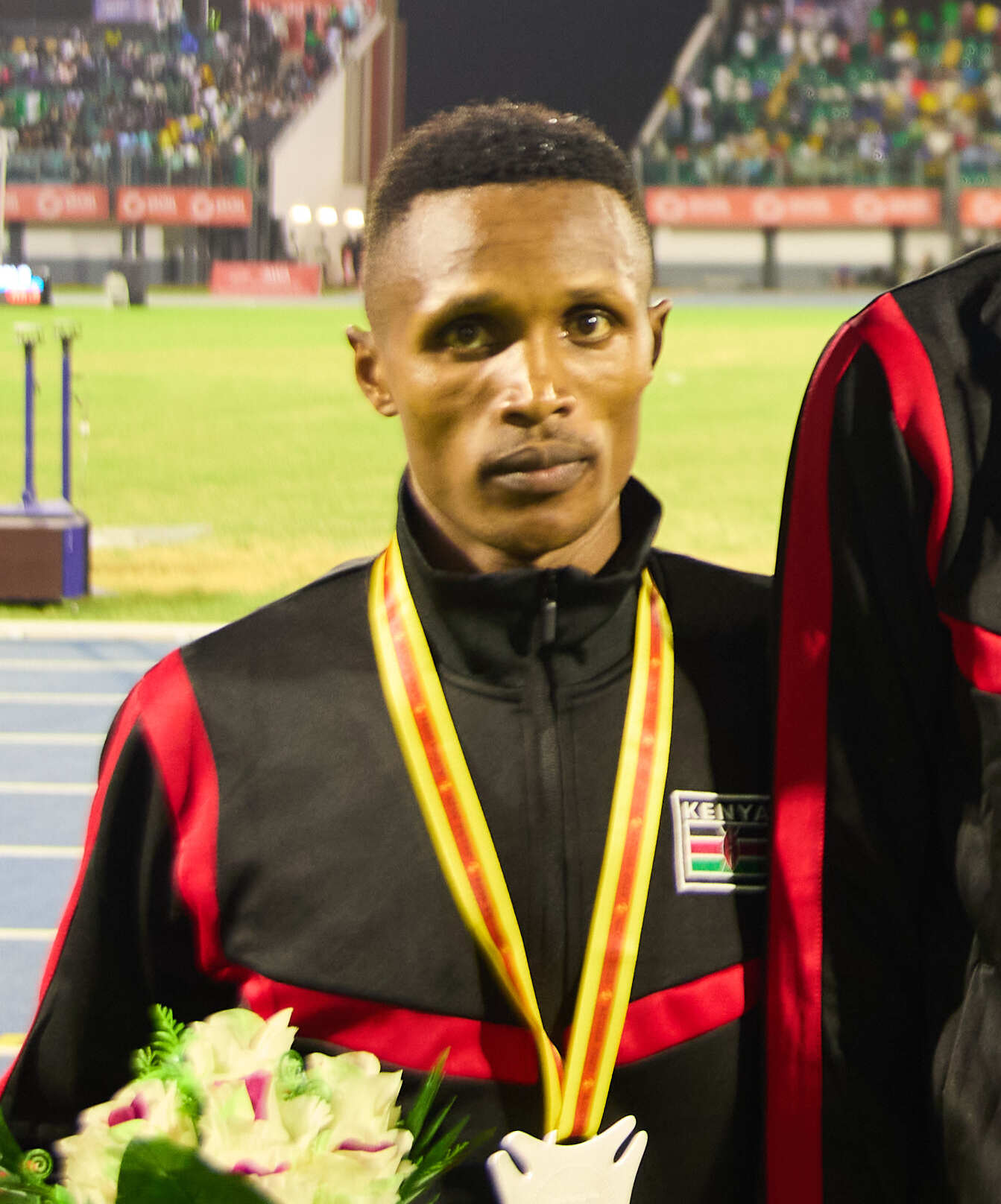
- 2023 African Games

Personal information
- Full name: Alex Ngeno Kipngetich
- Born: 17 August 2000 (age 25)

Sport
- Sport: Athletics
- Event: 800 metres
Medal record
Men's athletics
Representing Kenya
African Games
| Silver medal – second place | 2023 Accra | 800 m |
African Championships
| Gold medal – first place | 2024 Douala | 800 m |

Alex Ngeno Kipngetich (born 17 August 2000) is a Kenyan middle-distance runner specialising in the 800 metres. He represented his country at the 2019 World Championships, advancing to the semifinals. In addition, he won a silver medal at the 2018 IAAF World U20 Championships.

== International competitions ==
| Year | Competition | Venue | Position | Event | Notes |
Representing Kenya
| 2018 | World U20 Championships | Tampere, Finland | 2nd | 800 m | 1:46.45 |
| 2019 | World Championships | Doha, Qatar | 20th (sf) | 800 m | 1:46.61 |
| 2023 | World Championships | Budapest, Hungary | 22nd (sf) | 800 m | 1:45.56 |
| 2024 | African Championships | Douala, Cameroon | 1st | 800 m | 1:45.02 |
| 2025 | World Indoor Championships | Nanjing, China | 6th (sf) | 800 m | 1:47.53 |
| 2025 | World Championships | Tokyo, Japan | 24th (h) | 800 m | 1:45.37 |

== Personal bests ==
Outdoor

- 800 metres – 1:43.74 (Nairobi 2024)

Indoor

- 800 metres – 1:48.84 (Val-de-Reuil 2019)
