= Josué Canales =

Spanish athlete (born 2001)

Elvin Josué Canales
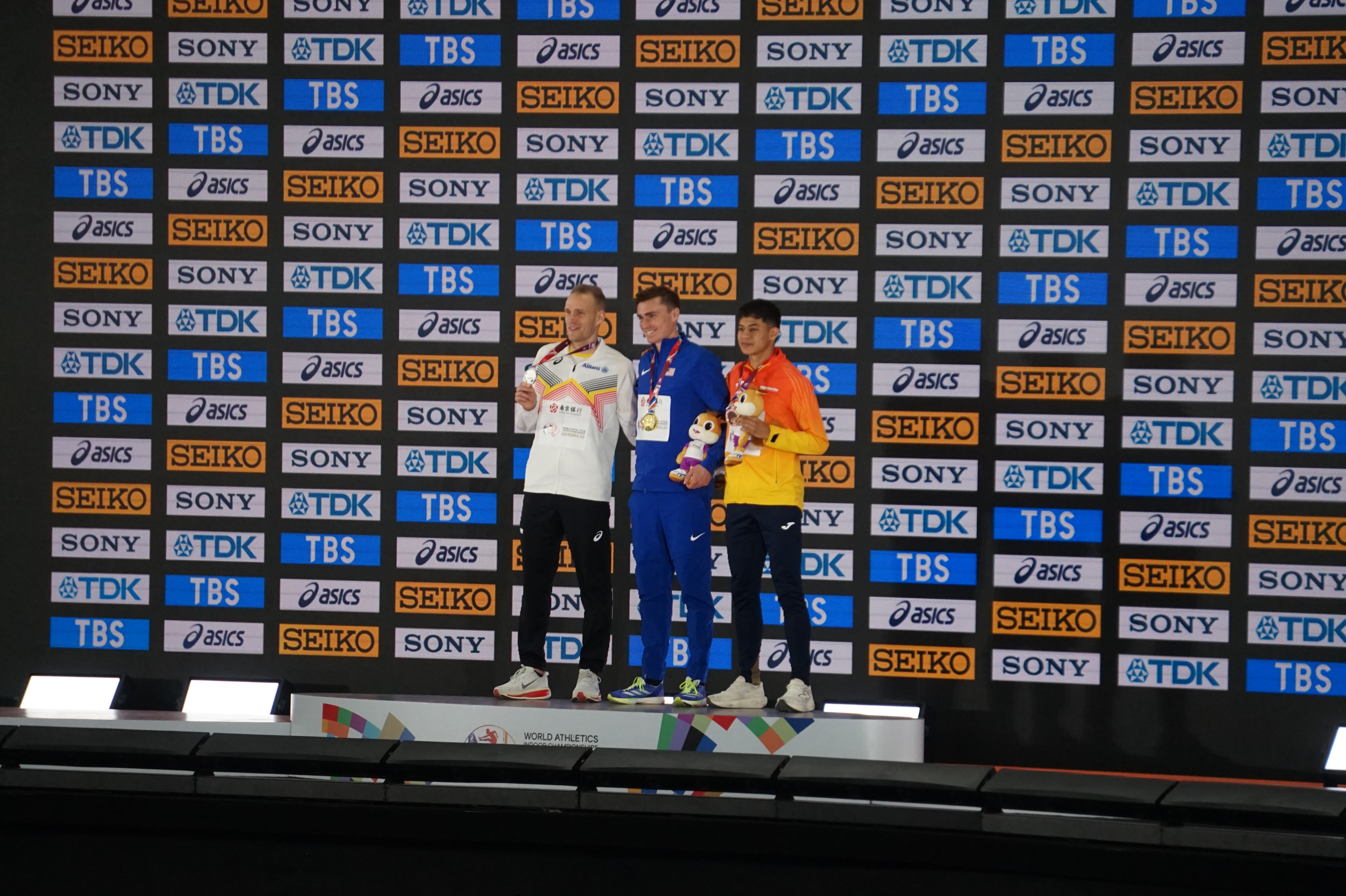
- Canales in 2025

Personal information
- Full name: Elvin Josué Canales Escoto
- Nationality: Spanish
- Born: 5 September 2001 (age 24) Honduras
- Height: 1.75 m (5 ft 9 in)

Sport
- Country: Spain (since June 2024); Honduras (before)
- Sport: Athletics
- Event: Middle distance running

Achievements and titles
- Personal bests: 800 m: 1:44.49 (Guadalajara 2024); 1500 m: 3:58.56 (Sabadell 2020)
Medal record
Men's athletics
Representing Spain
World Indoor Championships
Bronze medal – third place	2025 Nanjing	800 m

Elvin Josué Canales Escoto (born 5 September 2001) is a Honduran-born Spanish middle-distance runner. In 2025, he became the Spanish indoor national record holder over 800 metres, and earned the bronze medal in this event at the 2025 World Athletics Indoor Championships in Nanjing.

== Early life ==
Born in Honduras, his parents were both 17 years-old when he was born. His mother works as a carer and his father a bricklayer. He moved to Girona in Spain when he was three years-old.

== Career ==
In 2017 he won the Spanish Under-18 Championships in Getafe in both the 400 and 800 metres races.

Representing Honduras he won gold in the 800 metres and 1500 metres at the 2020 Central American Championships in Athletics in Costa Rica.

In June 2024, he ran 1:44.49 in Guadalajara to meet the minimum standard for the Olympic Games. Later that month he received clearance to represent Spain. In his first race as a Spaniard he finished second in the 800 meters at the Spanish Athletics Championships in La Nucia. He competed in the 800 metres at the 2024 Summer Olympics in Paris in August 2024.

Competing at the 2025 World Athletics Indoor Tour meeting in Luxembourg in January 2025, he took the Spanish indoor record and moved to sixth on the all-time European 800 metres list with a run of 1:44.65. He qualified for the final of the 800 metres at the 2025 European Athletics Indoor Championships in Apeldoorn. He qualified for the final of the 800 metres at the 2025 World Athletics Indoor Championships in Nanjing, where he earned a bronze medal.

Canales was selected for the 2026 World Athletics Indoor Championships in Poland in March 2026 and was active in the front of his 800 m heat, but did not advance to the semi-finals, running 1:47.30.

== International competitions ==
Year	Competition	Venue	Position	Event	Notes
Representing Honduras
2017	World U18 Championships	Nairobi, Kenya	4th (sf)	400 m	48.21
2017	Central American Games	Managua, Nicaragua	2nd	800 m	1:52.92
2018	Youth Olympic Games	Buenos Aires, Argentina	15th	800 m	1:52.52
2020	Central American Championships	San José, Costa Rica	1st	800 m	2:01.30
2020	Central American Championships	San José, Costa Rica	1st	1500 m	4:05.46
Representing Spain
2024	Olympic Games	Paris, France	33rd (h)	800 m	1:46.48
2025	European Indoor Championships	Apeldoorn, Netherlands	5th	800 m i	1:45.88
2025	World Indoor Championships	Nanjing, China	3rd	800 m i	1:45.03
2026	World Indoor Championships	Toruń, Poland	22nd (h)	800 m i	1:47.30
