= 2017 African U20 Championships in Athletics =

13th African U20 Championships
- Dates: 29 June–2 July
- Host city: Tlemcen, Algeria
- Venue: Stade Lalla Setti
- Level: Under-20
- Events: 43

The 2017 African Junior Athletics Championships was the thirteenth edition of the biennial, continental athletics tournament for African athletes aged 19 years or younger. It was held at the Stade Lalla Setti in Tlemcen, Algeria, between 29 June and 2 July.

== Medal summary ==
=== Men ===
Event	Gold		Silver		Bronze	
100 metres (Wind: +2.8 m/s)	Thembo Monareng (RSA)	10.41	Tinotenda Matiyenga (ZIM)	10.50	Sharry Dodin (SEY)	10.58
200 metres (Wind: +1.1 m/s)	Clarence Munyai (RSA)	20.22 CR	Kundai Maguranyanga (ZIM)	21.11	Tinotenda Matiyenga (ZIM)	21.14
400 metres	Wogen Tucho (ETH)	47.65	Tumo Nkape (BOT)	47.83	Efrem Mekonen (ETH)	48.87
800 metres	Solomon Lekuta (KEN)	1:48.04	Taddesse Lemi (ETH)	1:48.76	Adisu Girma (ETH)	1:49.15
1500 metres	Welde Tufa (ETH)	3:44.39	Kiprugut Boaz (KEN)	3:44.78	Weretaw Esthete (ETH)	3:45.56
5000 metres	Selemon Barega (ETH)	13:51.43	Tesfahun Aklnew (ETH)	13:52.91	Nicholas Kimeli (KEN)	13:54.24
10,000 metres	Nicholas Kimeli (KEN)	29:52.15	Gizachew Hailu (ETH)	29:52.20	Taddesse Tesfahu (ETH)	30:13.95
110 metres hurdles (Wind: +2.4 m/s)	Mpho Tladi (RSA)	13.78	Louis François Mendy (SEN)	14.24	Ibrahim Jemal (ETH)	14.27
400 metres hurdles	Merid Alemu (ETH)	53.51	Oussama Hammi (MAR)	54.50	Mooketsi Montshiwa (BOT)	55.03
3000 metres steeplechase	Takele Nigate (ETH)	8:31.36	Tesfaye Deriba (ETH)	8:33.67	Nickson Kiplagat (KEN)	8:42.15
4×100 metres relay	Zimbabwe (ZIM); Dickson Kapandura; Tinotenda Matiyenga; Donovan Mutariswa; Kundai Maguranyanga	40.64	Gambia (GAM); Ansumana Bojang; Momodou Sey; Sengan Jobe; Sulayman Touray	41.07	Algeria (ALG); Mohamed Mahdi Zekraoui; Islam Boukhatem; Islam Zaoui; Mehdi Ani Nait Abdelaziz	41.34
4×400 metres relay	Ethiopia (ETH); Efrem Mekonen; Wogen Tucho; Ashanafi Debele; Abdurehman Abdo	3:11.89	Botswana (BOT); Lee Eppie; Tshepico Masalela; Onneile Phokedi; Tumo Nkape	3:16.64	Morocco (MAR); Hamimi Ossama; Hicham Akankam; Anouar El Aoufi; Achraf El Maliky	3:18.08
10,000 m walk	Yohanis Algaw (ETH)	44:43.47	Bahaeddine Gatri (TUN)	44:43.47	Saïd Touche (ALG)	45:37.41
High jump	Fadi Chehab (TUN)	2.00 m	Aobakwe Nikobela (BOT)	1.90 m	David Deng (ETH)	1.90 m
Pole vault	Reda Boudechiche (ALG)	4.30 m	Youcef Oucheni (ALG)	4.00 m	Abdelrahman Sassi (TUN)	3.20 m
Long jump	Soufiane Zakour (MAR)	7.36 m	Mouhcine Khoua (MAR)	7.33 m	Aaron Pedro (RSA)	7.10 m
Triple jump	Chengetayi Mapaya (ZIM)	16.30 m CR	Adir Gur (ETH)	15.65 m	Soufiane Zakour (MAR)	15.13 m
Shot put	Kayle Blignaut (RSA)	20.08 m	Patrick Duvenage (RSA)	18.31 m	Zegye Moga (ETH)	17.02 m
Discus throw	Patrick Duvenage (RSA)	59.46 m	Werner Visser (RSA)	58.70 m	Mohamed Chachi (MAR)	50.61 m
Hammer throw	Carel Haasbroek (RSA)	68.91 m	Sid Ali Aboudi (ALG)	59.65 m	Oualid Araba (MAR)	56.53 m
Javelin throw	Werner Dames (RSA)	72.75 m	Hernu van Vuuren (RSA)	72.74 m	Kereyu Gulala (ETH)	68.49 m
Decathlon	Tarek Rahmani (TUN)	5770 pts	Wassim Seksaf (ALG)	5709 pts	Hakim Mekerri (ALG)	5129 pts

=== Women ===
Event	Gold		Silver		Bronze	
100 metres (Wind: +0.9 m/s)	Mgbemena Kelechi Cabri (ZIM)	12.08	Severine Moutia (MRI)	12.44	Abissie Kebede (ETH)	12.45
200 metres (Wind: +0.5 m/s)	Ola Buwaro (GAM)	24.60	Tsige Duguma (ETH)	24.71	Mgbemena Kelechi Cabri (ZIM)	24.71
400 metres	Frehiywot Wondie (ETH)	54.43	Mahilet Fikre (ETH)	55.45	Nomatter Kafudzaruma (ZIM)	56.88
800 metres	Tigist Ketema (ETH)	2:05.85	Josephine Chelangat (KEN)	2:06.48	Khadidja Benkacem (MAR)	2:08.26
1500 metres	Joyline Cherotich (KEN)	4:30.57	Fantu Worku (ETH)	4:30.76	Almaz Samuel (ETH)	4:31.59
3000 metres	Joyline Cherotich (KEN)	9:27.11	Sandra Chebet (KEN)	9:27.59	Meselu Berhe (ETH)	9:28.10
5000 metres	Meskerem Mamo (ETH)	15:37.13	Sandra Chebet (KEN)	15:41.64	Kalkidan Fentie (ETH)	15:49.63
100 metres hurdles	Taylon Bieldt (RSA)	13.82	Asmaa Baya Araibia (ALG)	13.98	Gebeyanesh Gadecha (ETH)	15.03
400 metres hurdles	Sara El Hachimi (MAR)	60.62	Deme Abu (ETH)	61.18	Chaima Ouanis (ALG)	63.16
3000 metres steeplechase	Mekides Abebe (ETH)	10:11.80	Maritu Ketema (ETH)	10:12.83	Only 2 competitors	
4×100 metres relay	Algeria (ALG); Menana Djihene Benselka; Asmaa Baya Araibia; Abdelaziz Ait; Chaima Ouanis	48.44	Zimbabwe (ZIM); Alice Agostino; Gabri Mgbemena; Kudzai Violet Nyachiya; Masciline Watama	51.19	Only 2 teams competing	
4×400 metres relay	Ethiopia (ETH); Mahilet Fikre; Shimbira Niguse; Zinash Hunde; Frehiywot Wondie	3:48.19	Algeria (ALG); Marjoa Kahli; Chaima Ouanis; Manel Bendaska; Faten Laribi	4:03.09	Only 2 teams competing	
10,000 m walk	Ayalnesh Dejene (ETH)	52:14.73	Yehualeye Beletew (ETH)	52:15.14	Souhila Azzi (ALG)	53:49.98
High jump	Yvonne Robson (RSA)	1.74 m	Fatima Elalaoui (MAR)	1.68 m	Khadidja Manel Ameur (ALG)	1.65 m
Pole vault	May Massika Mezioud (ALG)	2.80 m	Hassiba Kasmi (ALG)	2.60 m	Only two finishers	
Long jump	Asmaa Baya Araibia (ALG)	6.02 m	Zineb Ajalal (MAR)	5.68 m	Fatimata Zougrana (BUR)	5.41 m
Triple jump	Fatimata Zougrana (BUR)	12.55 m (w)	Ajuba Oumede (ETH)	11.94 m	Fatou Badji (SEN)	11.91 m
Shot put	Jana Steinman (RSA)	13.15 m	Yolandi Stander (RSA)	12.72 m	Ouidad Yesli (ALG)	11.68 m
Discus throw	Yolandi Stander (RSA)	49.13 m	Katia Hammoumraoui (ALG)	38.17 m	Naila Dehamnia (ALG)	35.05 m
Hammer throw	Samira Addi (MAR)	56.29 m	Juliane Claire (MRI)	45.55 m	Azza Diff (TUN)	43.94 m
Heptathlon	Jone Kruger (RSA)	4850 pts	Afaf Benhadja (ALG)	4552 pts	Souleyma Ghannay (TUN)	3718 pts

== Medal table ==
Key

The host country is highlighted in lavender blue

Rank	Nation	Gold	Silver	Bronze	Total
1	Ethiopia (ETH)	13	13	12	38
2	South Africa (RSA)	12	4	1	17
3	Algeria (ALG)*	4	8	8	20
4	Kenya (KEN)	4	4	2	10
5	Morocco (MAR)	3	4	5	12
6	Zimbabwe (ZIM)	3	3	3	9
7	Tunisia (TUN)	2	1	3	6
8	Gambia (GAM)	1	1	0	2
9	Burkina Faso (BUR)	1	0	1	2
10	Botswana (BOT)	0	3	1	4
11	Mauritius (MRI)	0	2	0	2
12	Senegal (SEN)	0	1	1	2
13	Seychelles (SEY)	0	0	1	1
Totals (13 entries)		43	44	38	125
