= Tumo Nkape =

Botswana athlete (born 1998)

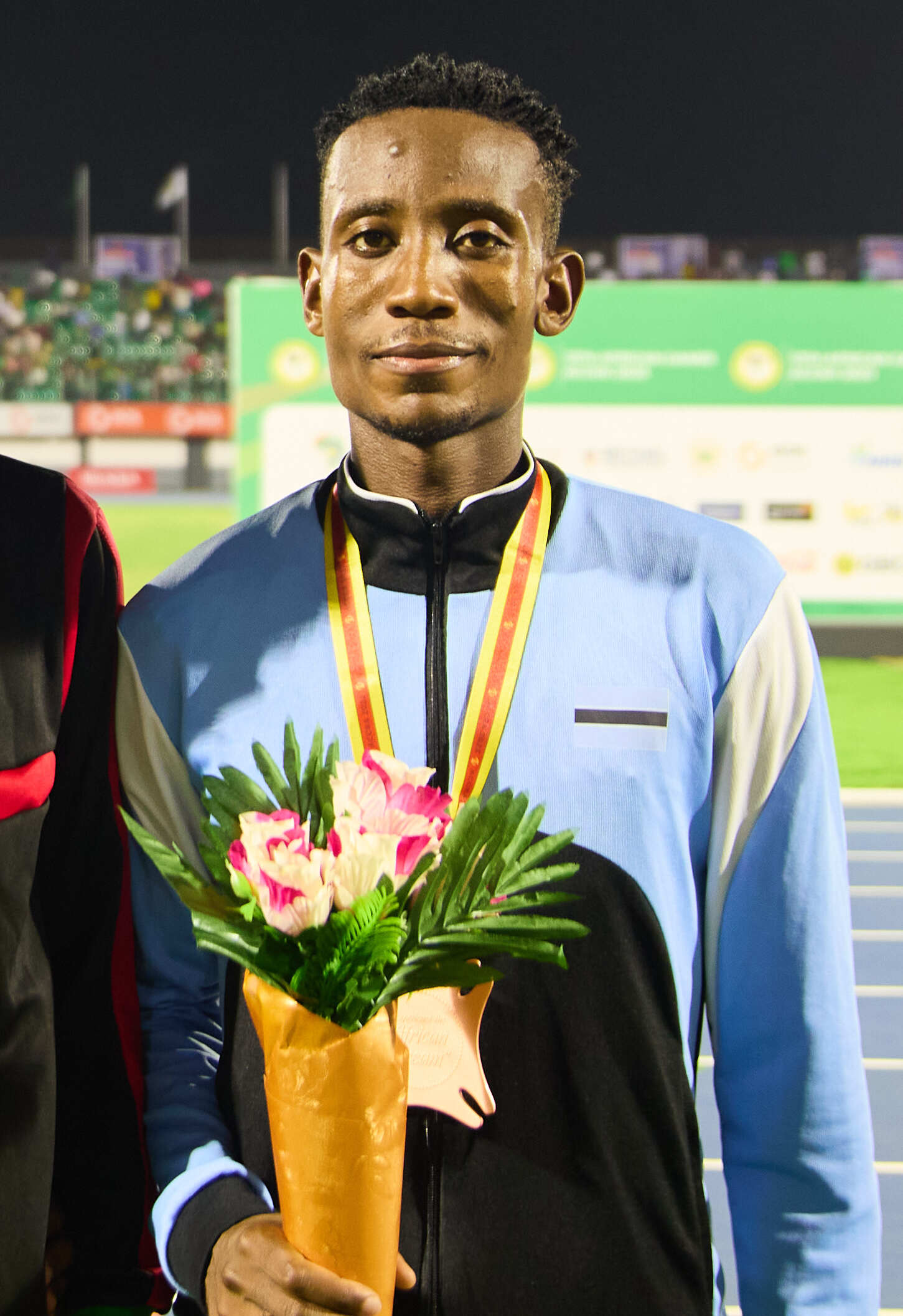
- Nkape at the 2023 African Games

Personal information
- Nationality: Botswana
- Born: 24 April 1998 (age 28)

Sport
- Sport: Athletics
- Event: Middle distance running

Achievements and titles
- Personal bests: 800m: 1:45.25 (Cape Town, 2024)
Medal record
Representing Botswana
African Games
Bronze medal – third place	2023 Accra	800 m
African U20 Championships
Silver medal – second place	2017 Tlemcen	400 m
Silver medal – second place	2017 Tlemcen	4×400m relay

Tumo Nkape (born 24 April 1998) is a Botswana middle distance runner. In 2024, he became national champion over 800 metres.

== Career ==
He won a silver medal in the 400 metres and a silver medal in the 4x400m relay at the 2017 African U20 Championships in Tlemcen, Algeria.

He won bronze at the 2023 African Games in Accra, in the 800 metres, in a personal best of 1:46.08. In April 2024, he lowered his personal best to 1:45.25 in Cape Town.

He won the Botswana Athletics Championships 800m title in Gaborone in May 2024. He finished fourth in the 800 metres at the 2024 African Championships in Douala, Cameroon in June 2024. He competed in the 800 metres at the 2024 Summer Olympics in Paris in August 2024.
