= Yohannes Tefera =

Ethiopian athlete (born 2004)

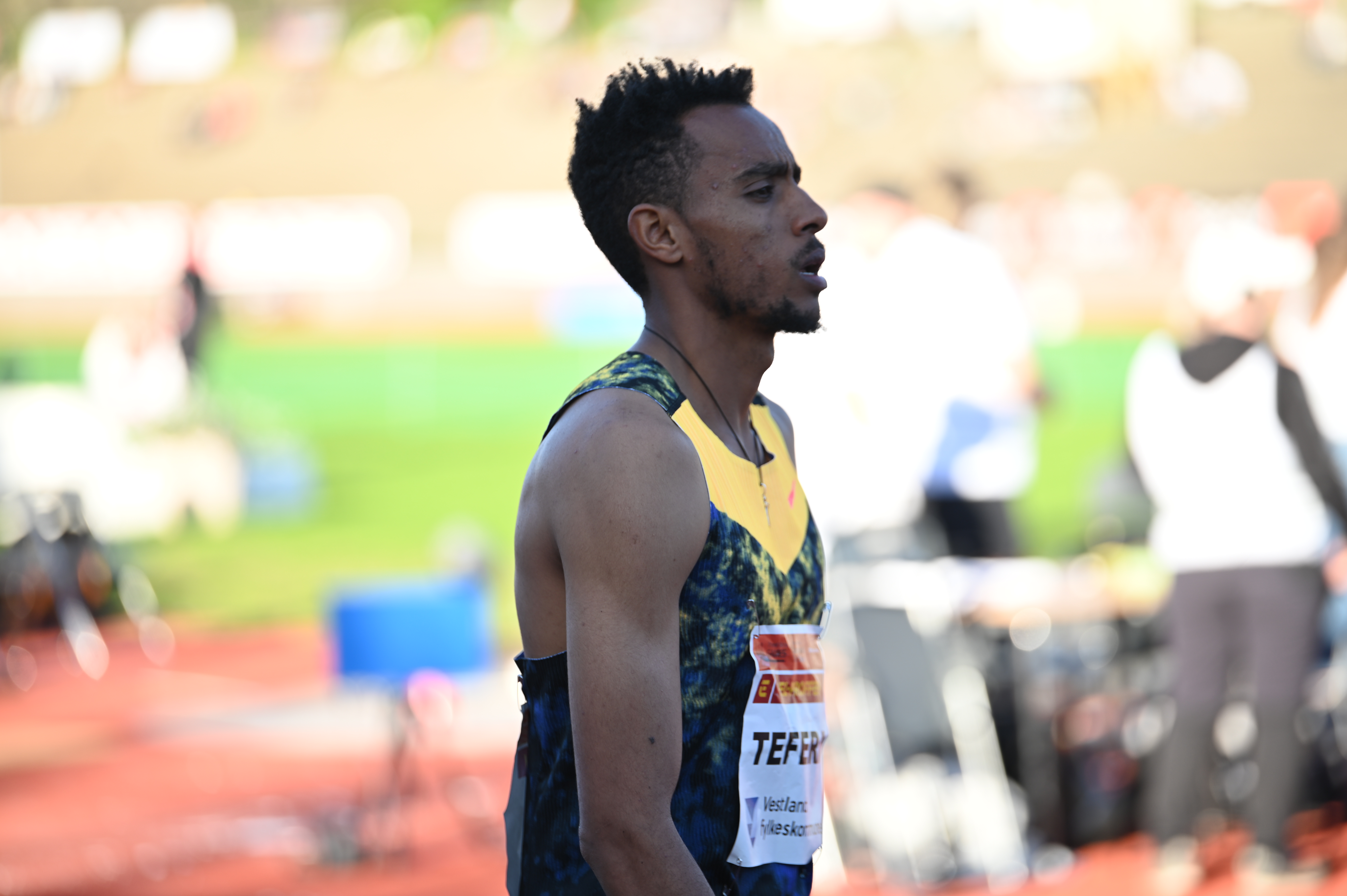
- Yohanes Tefera in 2026

Personal information
- Born: 28 March 2004 (age 22)

Sport
- Sport: Athletics
- Event: Middle distance running

Achievements and titles
- Personal best(s): 800m: 1:44.49 (Tomblaine, 2025)

Yohannes Tefera (born 28 March 2004) is an Ethiopian middle-distance runner.

== Career ==
Tefera placed sixth in the 800 metres at the delayed 2023 African Games held in Accra, Ghana, in March 2024. He finished eighth in the 800 metres at the 2024 African Championships in Douala, Cameroon in June 2024.

Tefera won the 800 metres at the Gouden Spike meet in Leiden, Netherlands in June 2025, with a time of 1:45.59. He ran a new personal best for the 800 metres of 1:44.09 competing in Nancy, France in July 2025. He competed at the 2025 World Athletics Championships in Tokyo, Japan, in September 2025 in the men's 800 metres.
