= Tom Dradiga =

Ugandan middle-distance runner (born 1996)

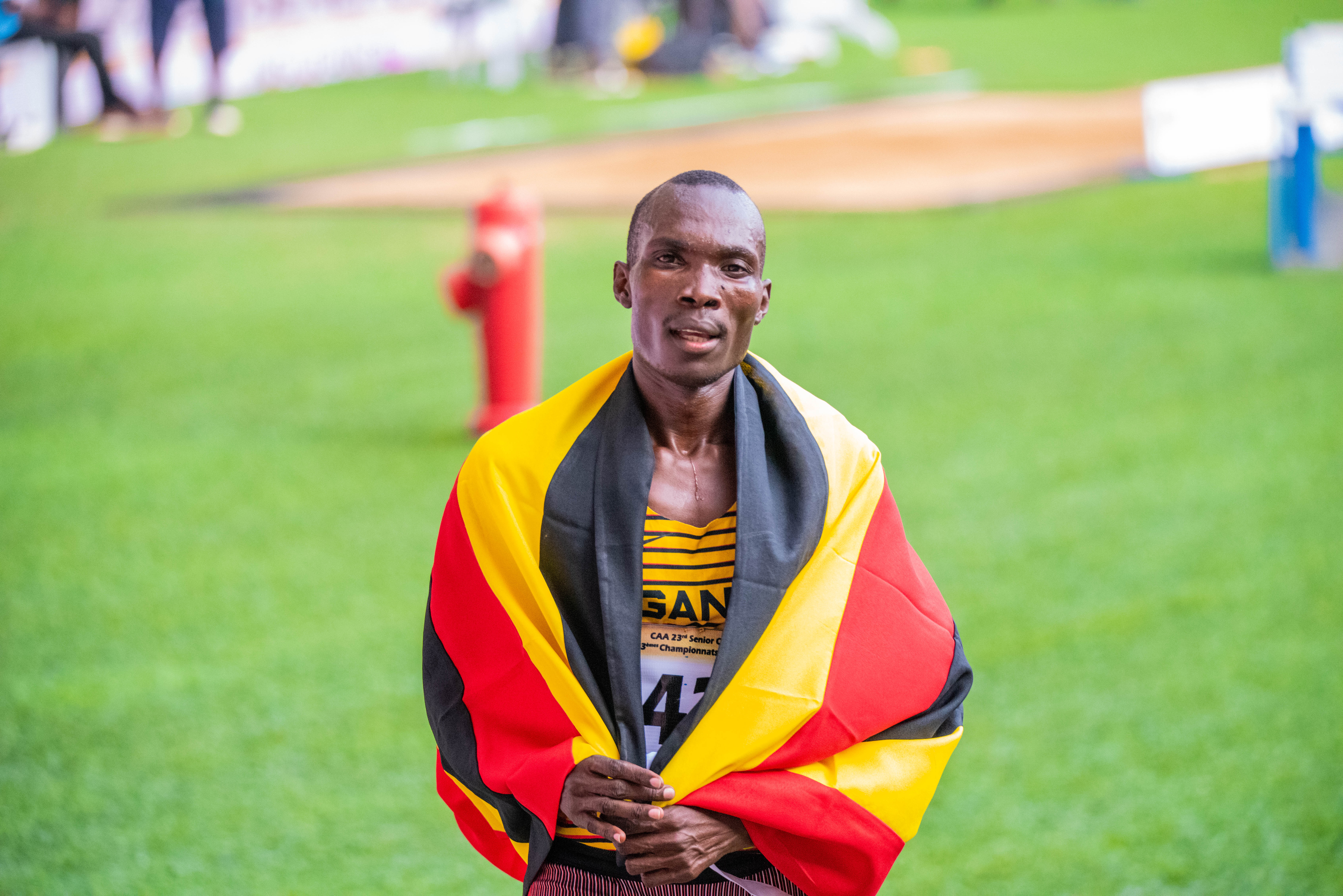

Personal information
- Nationality: Uganda
- Born: 17 June 1996 (30 years, 46 days old)
- Home town: West Nile sub-region, Uganda
- Height: 180 cm (5 ft 11 in)
- Weight: 67 kg (148 lb)

Sport
- Sport: Athletics
- Event: 800 metres
- Club: Uganda Wildlife Authority; Club Atletismo Unión Guadalajara
- Coached by: Edwin Kinalya; Mario Peinado; Jesús Peinado

Achievements and titles
- National finals: 2022 Ugandan Champs; • 800m, 1st (gold)
- Personal best: 800m: 1:44.74 (2023)
Medal record
Men's athletics
Representing Uganda
African Championships
Bronze medal – third place	2024 Douala	800 m
- Updated on 15 January 2024

Tom Dradiga (born 17 June 1996), also spelled Tom Dradriga, is a Ugandan middle-distance runner specializing in the 800 metres. He is a two-time Ugandan national champion in the event and has a best of 1:44.74.

== Career ==
Dradiga began his career domestically, achieving a 1:52 800 m personal best after a series of Uganda Athletics Federation trial races in 2018. His first breakthrough came in August 2019, when he improved his personal best from 1:48.50 to 1:46.84 in finishing second at the TBAC Meeting, behind Abu Salim Mayanja.

Due to the COVID-19 pandemic cancelling major athletics meetings in 2020 and 2021, Dradiga's next personal best did not come until March 2022, running 1:46.58 to win the inaugural National Trials meeting in Kampala. On 25 March 2022, Dradiga won the Djibouti Meeting International, which served as the Djiboutian Athletics Championships for that year but also allowed foreigners to compete.

Dradiga's season best qualified him for the 2022 African Championships in Athletics, where he advanced beyond the quarter-finals on time but finished sixth in his semi-final, failing to advance to the finals. After winning the Ugandan championships, Dradiga represented Uganda at the 2022 Commonwealth Games, where he finished 5th in his 800 m heat and again did not advance to the finals.

In 2023, Dradiga won the Meeting Desafio Nerja Restaurante Pulguilla Y Ayo in a personal best of 1:46.52. One month later, Dradiga made the biggest improvement of his career to finish 2nd at the Memorial José Antonio Cansino in Castellón. His time of 1:44.80 was an improvement of almost two seconds, qualifying him for the 2023 World Athletics Championships. He improved that personal best by another 0.06 seconds at the Meeting de Madrid one month before flying to Budapest for his World Championships round. In his heat, Dradiga finished 7th in 1:48.60 and did not advance to the semi-finals.

== Personal life ==
Dradiga is from the West Nile sub-region of Uganda. Until 2022, he trained under the Uganda Wildlife Authority Athletics club, with a group of sprinters coached by Edwin Kinalya.

In 2023, Dradiga moved to Spain and became a member of the Club Atletismo Unión Guadalajara, coached by Mario Peinado and Jesús Peinado. He trains with fellow Ugandan Dismas Yeko, who also competes for the club.

== Statistics ==
=== Best performances ===
Event	Mark	Pl.	Competition	Venue	Date	Ref
800 metres	1:44.74	4th	Meeting Madrid	Madrid, Spain	22 July 2023	
